= 2012–13 Segunda División B =

Spanish football season

Segunda División B
- Season: 2012–13
- Champions: Alavés
- Promoted: Alavés; Tenerife; Eibar; Real Jaén

The 2012–13 Segunda División B season was the 36th since its establishment. The first matches of the season were played on 26 August 2012, and the league phase ended on 19 May 2013. The entire season ended on 30 June 2013 with the promotion play-off finals.

== Summary before 2012–13 season ==
Playoffs de Ascenso:

- Real Madrid Castilla (P)
- CD Tenerife
- CD Lugo (P)
- Albacete Balompié
- CD Mirandés (P)
- SD Ponferradina (P)
- SD Eibar
- SD Amorebieta
- CD Atlético Baleares
- Orihuela CF
- Huracán CF
- CF Badalona
- Cádiz CF
- Real Balompédica Linense
- Lucena CF
- Real Jaén

Relegated from Segunda División:

- Villarreal CF B
- CD Alcoyano
- FC Cartagena
- Gimnàstic de Tarragona

Promoted from Tercera División:

- CD Ourense (from Group 1)
- Caudal Deportivo (from Group 2)
- SD Noja (from Group 3)
- AE Prat (from Group 5)
- Loja CD (from Group 9)
- CE Constància (from Group 11)
- CD Marino (from Group 12)
- Arroyo CP (from Group 14)
- SD Logroñés (from Group 16)
- Barakaldo CF (from Group 4)
- CF Fuenlabrada (from Group 7)
- San Fernando CD (from Group 10)
- Atlético Sanluqueño CF (from Group 10)
- CD Binissalem (from Group 11)
- Yeclano Deportivo (from Group 13)
- Peña Sport FC (from Group 15)
- CD Izarra (from Group 15)
- CD Tudelano (from Group 15)

Relegated:

- Celta de Vigo B (to 3ª Group 1)
- UD Vecindario (to 3ª Group 12)
- UB Conquense (to 3ª Group 18)
- CD Toledo (to 3ª Group 18)
- Montañeros CF (unregistered)
- SD Lemona (to 3ª Group 4)
- Arandina CF (to 3ª Group 8)
- Gimnástica Segoviana CF (to 3ª Group 8)
- Burgos CF (to 3ª Group 8)
- CF Gandía (to 3ª Group 6)
- CD Manacor (to 3ª Group 11)
- Andorra CF (to 3ª Group 17)
- CF Sporting Mahonés (dissolved)
- CD Roquetas (to 3ª Group 9)
- Sporting Villanueva (to 3ª Group 14)
- Lorca Atlético CF (dissolved)
- CF La Unión (dissolved)
- Polideportivo Ejido (dissolved)

Administrative Relegation:

- CD Dénia (to 3ª Group 6)
- Orihuela CF (to 3ª Group 6), readmitted on 5 September 2012 after warrant. Then the Group 3 was expanded to 21 teams.
- CF Palencia (to 3ª Group 8)
- AD Ceuta (to 3ª Group 10)
- CD Badajoz (dissolved)
- CD Puertollano (to 3ª Group 18)

Teams covered vacant places by administrative relegations:

- Avilés (from 3ª Group 2)
- Racing de Santander B (from 3ª Group 3)
- Espanyol B (from 3ª Group 5)
- Levante B (from 3ª Group 6)
- Real Madrid C (from 3ª Group 7)
- UCAM Murcia (from 3ª Group 13)

== Groups ==
According to RFEF the distribution of teams in groups, are as follows:

=== Group I ===
- RSD Alcalá
- Atlético Madrid B
- Avilés
- Caudal de Mieres
- Coruxo
- Fuenlabrada
- Getafe B
- Guijuelo
- Leganés
- Marino de Arona
- Marino de Luanco
- Ourense
- Rayo Vallecano B
- Real Madrid C
- Real Oviedo
- Salamanca
- S.S. de los Reyes
- Sporting de Gijón B
- Tenerife
- Zamora

=== Group II ===
- Alavés
- Amorebieta
- Barakaldo
- Bilbao Athletic
- Eibar
- Gimnástica Torrelavega
- Izarra
- Lleida Esportiu
- SD Logroñés
- UD Logroñés
- Noja
- Osasuna B
- Peña Sport
- Racing de Santander B
- Real Sociedad B
- Real Unión
- Sestao River
- Teruel
- Tudelano
- Zaragoza B

=== Group III ===
- Alcoyano
- At. Baleares
- Badalona
- Binissalem
- Constància
- Espanyol B
- Gimnàstic de Tarragona
- Huracán Valencia
- L'Hospitalet
- Levante B
- Llagostera
- Mallorca B
- Olímpic Xàtiva
- Ontinyent
- Orihuela
- Prat
- Reus Deportiu
- Sant Andreu
- Valencia Mestalla
- Villarreal B
- Yeclano

=== Group IV ===
- Albacete
- Almería B
- Arroyo
- At. Sanluqueño
- Betis B
- Cacereño
- Cádiz
- Cartagena
- Écija
- Jaén
- La Roda
- Linense
- Loja
- Lucena
- Melilla
- San Fernando
- San Roque
- Sevilla Atlético
- UCAM Murcia
- Villanovense

== Group 1 ==
=== Stadia and locations ===
Location of teams in Segunda División B Gr. 1 2012–13
Canary Islands

Team	Founded	Home city	Stadium	Capacity
Alcalá	1929	Alcalá de Henares, Madrid	Municipal del Val	6,000
Atlético B	1970	Madrid, Community of Madrid	Cerro del Espino	3,367
Avilés	1983	Avilés, Asturias	Román Suárez Puerta	7,200
Caudal	1918	Mieres, Asturias	Hermanos Antuña	4,500
Coruxo	1930	Coruxo, Vigo, Galicia	O Vao	1,200
Fuenlabrada	1975	Fuenlabrada, Community of Madrid	Fernando Torres	1,500
Getafe B	1983	Getafe, Community of Madrid	Ciudad Deportiva	1,500
Guijuelo	1974	Guijuelo, Castile and León	Municipal de Guijuelo	1,500
Leganés	1928	Leganés, Community of Madrid	Butarque	8,158
CD Marino	1936	Playa de las Américas, Arona, Canary Islands	Antonio Domínguez	3,500
Marino de Luanco	1931	Luanco, Asturias	Miramar	5,000
Ourense	1952	Ourense, Galicia	O Couto	5,200
Real Oviedo	1926	Oviedo, Asturias	Carlos Tartiere	30,500
Rayo B	1956	Madrid, Community of Madrid	Ciudad Deportiva	800
Real Madrid C	1952	Madrid, Community of Madrid	Ciudad Real Madrid	2,000
Salamanca	1923	Salamanca, Castile and León	El Helmántico	17,341
S.S. Reyes	1971	San Sebastián de los Reyes, Madrid	Matapiñoneras	3,000
Sporting B	1967	Gijón, Asturias	Mareo	3,000
Tenerife	1922	Tenerife, Canary Islands	Heliodoro Rodríguez López	24,000
Zamora	1969	Zamora, Castile and León	Ruta de la Plata	8,000

=== League table ===
Pos	Team	Pld	W	D	L	GF	GA	GD	Pts	Qualification or relegation
1	Tenerife (C, P)	38	20	13	5	62	28	+34	73	Qualification for Play-Off
2	Leganés	38	20	10	8	57	35	+22	70	Qualification for Play-Off
3	Oviedo	38	18	12	8	53	33	+20	66	Qualification for Play-Off
4	Caudal Mieres	38	17	9	12	49	37	+12	60	Qualification for Play-Off
5	Real Madrid C	38	15	12	11	59	42	+17	57	
6	Fuenlabrada	38	14	14	10	55	45	+10	56	Qualification for 2013–14 Copa del Rey
7	Atlético Madrid B	38	15	9	14	56	49	+7	54	
8	Salamanca	38	13	14	11	59	48	+11	53 (Note: Salamanca were liquidated at the end of season.)	
9	Coruxo	38	14	10	14	38	45	−7	52	
10	Getafe B	38	11	15	12	39	37	+2	48	
11	Marino de Luanco	38	13	8	17	40	51	−11	47 (Note: LUA: 9 pts → LUA 3–1 OUR; OUR: 9 pts → OUR 1–0 LUA; SpgB: 0 pts)	
12	Ourense	38	11	14	13	42	46	−4	47	
13	Sporting de Gijón B	38	11	14	13	44	47	−3	47	
14	Real Avilés	38	13	7	18	43	54	−11	46	
15	Guijuelo	38	11	12	15	34	50	−16	45	
16	Zamora (O)	38	7	22	9	42	50	−8	43 (Note: ZAM 3–1 SSR; SSR 0–0 ZAM)	Qualification for Play-out
17	SS Reyes (R)	38	10	13	15	35	48	−13	43	Relegation to 2013–14 Tercera División
18	RSD Alcalá (R)	38	10	11	17	27	44	−17	41	Relegation to 2013–14 Tercera División
19	Rayo Vallecano B (R)	38	7	15	16	38	57	−19	36	Relegation to 2013–14 Tercera División
20	Marino (R)	38	9	8	21	36	62	−26	35	Relegation to 2013–14 Tercera División

Source: futbolme
Rules for classification: 1) points; 2) head-to-head points; 3) head-to-head goal difference; 4) head-to-head goals scored; 5) goal difference; 6) number of goals scored.
(C) Champions; (O) Play-off winners; (P) Promoted; (R) Relegated

=== Results ===
Home \ Away	ALC	ATM	AVI	CAU	COR	FLA	GET	GUJ	LEG	MAR	LUA	OUR	ROV	RVB	RMC	SAL	SSR	SPO	TEN	ZAM
RSD Alcalá	—	4–1	1–0	1–0	1–0	0–1	2–1	1–1	1–0	0–1	1–1	0–0	2–1	1–3	0–2	1–1	1–0	0–0	0–0	1–1
Atlético B	3–0	—	3–1	1–2	3–0	5–2	1–1	3–1	1–2	0–1	3–0	3–0	1–1	3–0	1–1	1–1	0–1	1–1	1–0	2–2
Real Avilés	2–0	1–2	—	1–3	0–0	2–1	2–3	2–0	0–2	1–0	1–0	1–1	0–2	4–0	0–4	0–0	2–1	1–1	0–3	2–1
Caudal Mieres	2–1	1–0	2–1	—	0–0	1–1	1–1	0–1	0–1	1–1	1–0	1–0	2–1	1–1	1–1	1–0	2–2	2–0	2–3	0–1
Coruxo	1–0	1–0	2–0	2–1	—	1–0	1–2	0–1	2–1	2–0	2–3	1–1	1–2	2–0	1–5	1–0	2–1	2–1	1–1	1–1
Fuenlabrada	0–0	0–0	4–1	2–1	4–1	—	4–0	3–1	1–1	3–0	3–1	2–2	0–2	1–1	0–2	3–3	1–1	4–2	2–0	1–1
Getafe B	0–0	0–2	1–2	0–1	2–2	0–1	—	0–0	2–0	1–0	0–0	0–0	0–3	2–0	0–0	0–0	5–2	2–2	0–0	2–0
Guijuelo	1–0	3–0	0–2	0–2	1–0	0–0	0–1	—	2–1	0–0	3–2	1–1	0–0	3–2	1–2	3–2	0–0	1–0	0–0	1–1
Leganés	3–2	3–1	3–2	2–1	1–2	0–0	1–0	5–1	—	3–2	2–0	2–0	1–0	2–0	2–1	1–1	1–0	2–0	1–1	3–0
Marino	4–0	0–2	2–1	1–3	0–0	2–3	0–4	2–0	0–2	—	0–1	1–0	2–1	2–0	3–3	2–0	1–1	2–3	0–2	1–1
Marino de Luanco	3–0	1–2	0–1	1–4	2–0	1–0	1–1	3–1	1–1	2–1	—	3–1	1–2	1–3	1–1	2–1	0–1	2–1	1–1	1–0
Ourense	2–1	3–1	5–3	0–2	0–0	1–2	1–1	1–0	1–1	3–1	1–0	—	0–0	1–1	2–1	0–2	0–2	1–0	2–3	3–1
Oviedo	3–0	2–0	2–0	2–2	0–0	1–0	1–0	1–1	3–0	0–0	1–0	1–1	—	2–1	1–0	0–0	4–0	1–0	1–2	3–2
Rayo B	0–0	1–4	1–1	0–3	0–1	2–2	2–1	3–0	2–2	2–0	2–2	0–2	0–1	—	1–1	3–1	2–1	1–1	0–0	1–1
Real Madrid C	1–0	1–2	0–1	0–1	1–0	1–1	1–2	2–0	2–1	5–2	3–0	3–2	1–1	1–1	—	2–0	0–0	1–3	1–2	2–2
Salamanca	0–0	3–0	1–1	2–0	2–2	3–0	1–0	4–2	0–2	5–0	1–0	2–2	3–1	2–2	2–3	—	3–1	4–0	2–2	1–1
SS Reyes	1–0	1–1	1–0	1–1	1–0	1–2	0–2	1–0	0–0	3–1	0–1	1–1	3–2	0–0	0–2	5–1	—	1–1	0–3	0–0
Sporting B	3–1	2–1	0–0	1–0	1–2	1–1	1–0	0–0	0–0	3–1	0–1	0–1	4–1	2–0	2–1	1–3	0–0	—	3–2	2–2
Tenerife	0–1	4–0	1–0	2–0	5–2	2–0	1–1	1–2	2–1	1–0	4–0	1–0	1–1	2–0	2–0	2–0	3–0	1–1	—	1–1
Zamora	1–3	1–1	1–4	2–1	1–0	1–0	1–1	2–2	1–1	0–0	1–1	1–0	2–2	1–0	1–1	1–2	3–1	1–1	1–1	—

Source: BDFutbol
Legend: Blue = home team win; Yellow = draw; Red = away team win.

=== Top goalscorers ===
Last updated 19 May 2013

Goalscorers	Goals	Team
(Spain) Aridane Santana	25	Tenerife
(Spain) Diego Cervero	22	Real Oviedo
(Spain) Dioni Villalba	21	Leganés
(Spain) Miguel Ángel Guerrero	16	Sporting B
(Brazil) Igor de Souza	15	Salamanca

=== Top goalkeepers ===
Last updated 19 May 2013

Goalkeeper	Goals	Matches	Average	Team
(Spain) Sergio Aragoneses	25	36	0.69	Tenerife
(Spain) Alberto Domínguez	27	30	0.9	Getafe B
(Spain) Dani Barrio	27	29	0.93	Real Oviedo
(Spain) Rubén Falcón	35	35	1	Leganés
(Spain) Juancho Lechón	41	37	1.11	Alcalá

== Group 2 ==
=== Stadia and locations ===
Location of teams in Segunda División B Gr. 2 2012–13

Team	Founded	Home city	Stadium	Capacity
Alavés	1921	Vitoria-Gasteiz, Basque Country	Mendizorrotza	19,500
Amorebieta	1925	Amorebieta-Etxano, Basque Country	Urritxe	3,000
Athletic B	1964	Bilbao, Basque Country	Lezama	2,000
Barakaldo	1917	Barakaldo, Basque Country	Lasesarre	8,000
Eibar	1940	Eibar, Basque Country	Ipurua	5,200
Gimnástica Torrelavega	1907	Torrelavega, Cantabria	Nuevo Malecón	6,000
Izarra	1924	Estella-Lizarra, Navarre	Merkatondoa	3,200
Lleida Esportiu	2011	Lleida, Catalonia	Camp d'Esports	13,000
SD Logroñés	2009	Logroño, La Rioja	Las Gaunas	16,000
UD Logroñés	1967	Logroño, La Rioja	Las Gaunas	16,000
Noja	1940	Noja, Cantabria	La Caseta	2,500
Osasuna B	1964	Pamplona, Navarre	Tajonar	2,500
Peña Sport	1925	Tafalla, Navarre	San Francisco	3,000
Racing B	1926	Santander, Cantabria	El Sardinero	22,500
Real Sociedad B	1951	San Sebastián, Basque Country	Zubieta	2,500
Real Unión	1915	Irún, Basque Country	Stadium Gal	5,000
Sestao River	1996	Sestao, Basque Country	Las Llanas	8,000
Teruel	1946	Teruel, Aragon	Pinilla	4,000
Tudelano	1935	Tudela, Navarre	Ciudad de Tudela	9,500
Zaragoza B	1962	Zaragoza, Aragon	Ciudad Deportiva	2,500

=== League table ===
Pos	Team	Pld	W	D	L	GF	GA	GD	Pts	Qualification or relegation
1	Alavés (C, P)	38	25	7	6	57	22	+35	82	Qualification for Play-Off
2	Eibar (P)	38	21	10	7	59	28	+31	73	Qualification for Play-Off
3	Bilbao Athletic	38	21	8	9	64	35	+29	71	Qualification for Play-Off
4	Lleida Esportiu	38	17	15	6	56	34	+22	66	Qualification for Play-Off
5	Barakaldo	38	17	14	7	42	23	+19	65	Qualification for 2013–14 Copa del Rey
6	Amorebieta	38	16	12	10	48	39	+9	60	Qualification for 2013–14 Copa del Rey
7	Tudelano	38	15	11	12	48	46	+2	56	
8	Real Unión	38	14	13	11	53	39	+14	55	
9	Noja	38	13	8	17	43	48	−5	47	
10	SD Logroñés	38	12	10	16	37	60	−23	46 (Note: RSoB 2–2 SDL; SDL 1–0 RSoB)	
11	Real Sociedad B	38	11	13	14	37	45	−8	46	
12	Sestao River	38	9	16	13	34	40	−6	43	
13	Gimnástica Torrelavega (R)	38	10	12	16	36	46	−10	42 (Note: TOR 1–1 UDL; UDL 0–0 TOR) (Note: Gim.Torrelavega was relegated to Tercera División for not paying its players.)	
14	UD Logroñés	38	8	18	12	27	37	−10	42	
15	Peña Sport	38	9	14	15	35	41	−6	41 (Note: PEÑ: 7 pts; ZarB: 5 pts; RacB: 4 pts)	
16	Zaragoza B (R)	38	10	11	17	44	52	−8	41	Qualification for Play-out
17	Racing Santander B (R)	38	10	11	17	37	52	−15	41	Relegation to 2013–14 Tercera División
18	Teruel (R)	38	9	11	18	33	52	−19	38	Relegation to 2013–14 Tercera División
19	Osasuna B (R)	38	10	6	22	40	65	−25	36	Relegation to 2013–14 Tercera División
20	Izarra (R)	38	9	8	21	31	57	−26	35	Relegation to 2013–14 Tercera División

Source: futbolme
Rules for classification: 1) points; 2) head-to-head points; 3) head-to-head goal difference; 4) head-to-head goals scored; 5) goal difference; 6) number of goals scored.
(C) Champions; (P) Promoted; (R) Relegated

=== Results ===
Home \ Away	ALV	AMO	BRK	BAT	EIB	GMT	IZA	LLE	SDL	LOG	NOJ	OSA	PEÑ	RAC	RSO	RUN	SES	TER	TUD	ZAR
Alavés	—	4–1	0–0	1–1	1–0	2–0	2–0	1–1	2–0	2–0	2–0	0–1	1–0	2–0	0–1	3–0	2–0	2–0	2–0	1–0
Amorebieta	1–4	—	1–1	2–0	1–0	1–0	4–0	3–0	3–0	0–0	1–0	3–0	1–1	2–1	0–2	2–2	1–1	1–1	1–2	2–1
Barakaldo	0–1	0–0	—	1–0	0–1	1–1	2–1	0–1	4–0	0–0	3–0	1–0	1–1	1–1	1–1	2–0	2–1	1–0	1–0	1–3
Bilbao Athletic	1–2	3–1	0–0	—	2–2	2–1	5–0	1–0	5–0	1–0	2–1	2–1	1–2	4–0	1–0	2–0	2–1	5–2	2–1	3–1
Eibar	3–1	2–1	0–1	2–1	—	2–2	2–0	2–0	3–0	2–0	2–1	1–0	3–1	2–0	3–0	1–1	2–1	4–1	4–0	2–3
Gimnástica Torrelavega	1–2	0–0	0–2	0–1	0–0	—	2–0	1–1	1–1	2–1	2–1	1–1	1–0	2–1	0–4	3–1	0–1	3–1	0–1	0–1
Izarra	1–3	2–1	0–1	0–0	0–0	1–0	—	1–1	0–2	2–1	2–3	0–1	0–0	2–0	1–1	2–2	2–0	0–1	3–2	0–0
Lleida	2–1	1–1	2–2	2–0	2–2	4–1	2–0	—	1–1	1–1	0–1	3–1	2–0	1–0	4–1	0–0	0–0	2–1	1–0	3–0
SD Logroñés	0–1	3–1	1–1	2–5	0–1	1–1	4–1	2–4	—	1–1	0–4	2–0	0–0	1–0	1–0	1–0	1–0	2–0	1–2	1–1
UD Logroñés	0–1	1–2	0–0	2–0	1–1	0–0	1–0	0–3	1–1	—	0–0	2–1	2–3	1–1	0–0	0–0	0–0	2–0	1–0	3–2
Noja	1–1	0–0	1–0	0–1	1–1	2–3	0–1	1–0	0–1	2–1	—	2–1	0–0	0–2	2–0	0–1	1–1	1–0	2–3	1–1
Osasuna B	0–2	1–2	1–2	1–2	0–3	0–4	0–2	3–1	4–1	3–1	0–4	—	2–2	1–2	0–2	1–3	4–1	1–1	2–0	2–1
Peña Sport	0–1	0–1	0–1	1–2	0–1	1–1	2–0	1–1	2–0	0–1	1–2	2–2	—	0–1	3–2	2–1	2–1	1–1	0–1	1–0
Racing B	1–0	0–1	1–1	2–1	3–2	3–1	1–3	1–1	0–1	1–1	1–3	2–2	1–3	—	0–0	0–3	1–1	1–0	2–0	1–1
Real Sociedad B	1–1	0–0	0–3	0–0	0–1	1–1	2–1	0–1	2–2	0–0	2–1	0–1	1–0	2–1	—	0–0	1–1	1–3	2–1	2–1
Real Unión	0–1	2–0	1–0	2–1	1–1	1–0	3–0	1–1	0–0	3–1	4–0	2–0	0–0	2–1	4–1	—	1–1	0–1	1–1	4–0
Sestao	2–2	0–0	2–1	1–1	0–1	0–1	0–0	0–2	0–1	3–0	1–1	0–0	2–0	1–3	1–1	2–1	—	1–0	2–1	2–0
Teruel	0–1	3–1	0–2	0–3	1–0	0–0	2–1	1–1	2–0	0–0	1–2	0–1	1–1	1–1	0–2	3–2	1–1	—	1–3	1–1
Tudelano	1–1	1–4	1–1	1–1	1–0	1–0	3–2	1–1	5–1	0–0	1–0	2–0	1–1	0–0	4–2	2–1	1–1	0–0	—	1–1
Zaragoza B	2–1	0–1	0–1	0–0	0–0	3–0	1–0	1–3	1–1	0–1	5–2	4–1	1–1	2–0	1–0	3–3	0–1	1–2	1–3	—

Source: BDFutbol
Legend: Blue = home team win; Yellow = draw; Red = away team win.

=== Top goalscorers ===
Last updated 19 May 2013

Goalscorers	Goals	Team
(Spain) Jorge Galán	16	Osasuna B
(Spain) Jaime Mata	14	Lleida Esportiu
(Spain) Jon Orbegozo	14	Barakaldo
(Spain) Carlos Álvarez	13	Gimnástica Torrelavega
(Spain) Mikel Arruabarrena	13	Eibar

=== Top goalkeepers ===
Last updated 19 May 2013

Goalkeeper	Goals	Matches	Average	Team
(Spain) Xabi Irureta	22	33	0.67	Eibar
(Spain) Pau Torres	34	38	0.89	Lleida Esportiu
(Spain) Igor Etxebarrieta	34	36	0.94	Amorebieta
(Spain) Sergio López	36	37	0.97	UD Logroñés
(Spain) Alberto Montero	40	38	1.05	Sestao

== Group 3 ==
=== Stadia and locations ===
Location of teams in Segunda División B Gr. 3 2012–13

Team	Founded	Home city	Stadium	Capacity
Alcoyano	1929	Alcoy, Valencian Community	El Collao	5,000
Atlético Baleares	1920	Palma de Mallorca, Balearic Islands	Balear	18,000
Badalona	1903	Badalona, Catalonia	Camp del Centenari	6,500
Binissalem	1914	Binissalem, Balearic Islands	Miquel Pons	2,000
Constància	1922	Inca, Balearic Islands	Nou Camp	10,000
Espanyol B	1981	Sant Adrià de Besòs, Catalonia	Ciutat Esportiva	1,500
Gimnàstic	1914	Tarragona, Catalonia	Nou Estadi	14,000
Huracán Valencia	2011	Manises, Valencian Community	Municipal de Manises	1,500
L'Hospitalet	1957	L'Hospitalet de Llobregat, Catalonia	Feixa Llarga	6,740
Levante B	1962	Valencia, Valencian Community	Ciutat Esportiva	1,000
Llagostera	1947	Llagostera, Catalonia	Estadi Municipal	1,500
Mallorca B	1983	Palma de Mallorca, Balearic Islands	Ciudad Deportiva	2,000
Olímpic de Xàtiva	1932	Xàtiva, Valencian Community	La Murta	9,000
Ontinyent	1947	Ontinyent, Valencian Community	El Clariano	5,000
Orihuela	1993	Orihuela, Valencian Community	Los Arcos	3,500
Prat	1945	El Prat de Llobregat, Catalonia	Sagnier	1,000
Reus Deportiu	1909	Reus, Catalonia	Estadi Municipal	4,700
Sant Andreu	1925	Barcelona, Catalonia	Narcís Sala	6,563
Valencia Mestalla	1944	Valencia, Valencian Community	Paterna	4,000
Villarreal B	1999	Villarreal, Valencian Community	Ciudad Deportiva	5,000
Yeclano	2004	Yecla, Region of Murcia	La Constitución	4,000

=== League table ===
Pos	Team	Pld	W	D	L	GF	GA	GD	Pts	Qualification or relegation
1	L'Hospitalet (C)	40	23	11	6	66	28	+38	80 (Note: HOS 1–1 HUR; HUR 1–1 HOS)	Qualification for Play-Off
2	Huracán Valencia	40	21	17	2	52	24	+28	80	Qualification for Play-Off
3	Levante B	40	21	9	10	60	46	+14	72 (Note: ALY 1–2 LevB; LevB 3–2 ALY)	Qualification for Play-Off
4	Alcoyano	40	21	9	10	56	33	+23	72	Qualification for Play-Off
5	Olímpic Xàtiva	40	19	14	7	41	25	+16	71	Qualification for 2013–14 Copa del Rey
6	Gimnàstic Tarragona	40	15	15	10	53	35	+18	60	Qualification for 2013–14 Copa del Rey
7	Sant Andreu	40	15	13	12	39	37	+2	58	Qualification for 2013–14 Copa del Rey
8	Espanyol B	40	14	13	13	44	42	+2	55	
9	Villarreal B	40	13	15	12	59	57	+2	54	
10	Llagostera	40	13	11	16	45	44	+1	50	
11	Atlético Baleares	40	11	15	14	40	40	0	48 (Note: BAL: 8 pts; PRA: 5 pts → BAD 1–2 PRA; BAD: 5 pts → PRA 1–1 BAD)	
12	Prat	40	11	15	14	36	35	+1	48	
13	Badalona	40	11	15	14	36	41	−5	48	
14	Reus Deportiu	40	13	7	20	46	56	−10	46 (Note: ONT 0–2 REU; REU 3–2 ONT)	
15	Ontinyent	40	10	16	14	34	46	−12	46	
16	Valencia Mestalla	40	10	15	15	41	55	−14	45	
17	Constància	40	11	11	18	29	39	−10	44 (Note: CNS 0–1 MllB; MllB 0–2 CNS) (Note: Salamanca's liquidation resulted in a vacated spot in this tier next season. Constància's relegation was revoked to fill that spot.)	Qualification for Play-out
18	Mallorca B (R)	40	11	11	18	34	53	−19	44	Relegation to 2013–14 Tercera División
19	Orihuela (R)	40	7	18	15	29	44	−15	39	Relegation to 2013–14 Tercera División
20	Yeclano (R)	40	8	11	21	39	60	−21	35	Relegation to 2013–14 Tercera División
21	Binissalem (R)	40	7	9	24	22	61	−39	30	Relegation to 2013–14 Tercera División

Source: futbolme
Rules for classification: 1) points; 2) head-to-head points; 3) head-to-head goal difference; 4) head-to-head goals scored; 5) goal difference; 6) number of goals scored.
(C) Champions; (R) Relegated

=== Results ===
Home \ Away	ALY	BAL	BAD	BIN	CNS	ESP	GIM	HUR	HOS	LEV	LAG	MLL	XAT	ONT	ORI	PRA	REU	SAN	VMS	VIL	YEC
Alcoyano	—	1–0	2–0	2–0	2–1	4–0	0–0	1–4	1–1	1–2	2–0	1–1	4–1	3–0	4–0	1–0	1–1	2–0	0–0	1–1	1–0
Atlético Baleares	1–2	—	2–0	1–3	0–0	0–2	0–1	1–1	1–1	1–2	2–2	3–0	0–0	1–0	2–2	1–0	1–1	2–1	1–1	1–2	1–1
Badalona	2–0	1–1	—	1–0	1–1	0–0	2–2	0–1	0–2	1–1	2–0	0–0	0–0	1–2	0–0	1–2	2–1	3–1	0–2	2–0	0–4
Binissalem	1–0	1–0	0–2	—	1–2	1–4	0–3	0–2	0–1	1–4	0–1	1–3	0–0	1–1	1–0	2–0	2–1	0–0	1–0	2–2	0–2
Constància	1–0	0–3	0–0	0–0	—	1–0	0–1	0–0	0–1	0–0	2–1	0–1	0–0	0–0	1–0	1–0	1–1	1–2	0–2	0–1	2–3
Espanyol B	0–1	1–0	3–1	0–0	1–0	—	1–0	0–0	1–1	3–0	1–1	1–2	1–0	2–2	3–0	0–0	2–3	2–1	2–2	1–1	3–0
Gimnàstic Tarragona	1–1	1–1	0–0	2–0	1–3	4–0	—	1–1	1–2	2–1	2–0	4–1	2–2	0–0	0–0	1–0	2–1	2–0	1–1	5–1	0–0
Huracán Valencia	1–0	1–0	2–1	3–0	1–0	2–1	2–0	—	1–1	1–0	1–1	3–1	1–1	0–0	4–3	1–1	0–0	2–0	0–0	0–0	2–0
L'Hospitalet	3–0	0–1	2–1	3–1	2–0	3–0	3–2	1–1	—	2–1	2–0	2–0	0–0	1–2	0–0	2–1	4–0	2–0	4–0	2–1	2–0
Levante B	3–2	0–2	1–1	2–0	1–0	3–1	1–0	0–1	2–1	—	2–1	3–1	2–2	2–2	2–0	1–0	2–1	2–1	4–2	1–0	0–1
Llagostera	1–2	3–2	0–2	4–0	2–2	1–0	1–0	0–1	1–1	0–1	—	0–1	1–2	3–1	0–1	1–1	3–2	2–0	3–0	1–0	3–0
Mallorca B	1–2	1–2	0–1	2–0	0–2	1–0	1–1	1–1	0–2	4–1	1–1	—	0–1	1–1	1–0	2–1	0–1	2–1	2–0	1–1	1–0
Olímpic Xàtiva	0–0	1–0	3–1	0–0	1–0	2–0	2–1	3–1	1–0	1–0	0–0	1–0	—	1–0	2–0	0–1	2–1	0–0	1–2	2–0	0–3
Ontinyent	0–1	0–1	0–0	1–0	1–0	1–2	1–1	1–1	0–2	1–2	1–0	1–0	0–3	—	0–0	3–0	0–2	1–1	1–1	1–0	2–1
Orihuela	2–2	1–1	1–0	2–0	1–2	1–0	1–1	0–1	0–0	0–2	0–0	0–0	0–2	0–0	—	1–1	3–1	0–1	2–0	1–1	2–0
Prat	1–0	0–0	1–1	1–1	0–0	0–0	0–0	0–2	2–1	1–1	0–0	4–0	0–0	4–1	0–0	—	1–0	0–1	3–0	0–0	1–0
Reus Deportiu	0–2	2–0	0–2	1–0	0–2	1–2	0–2	1–1	3–2	2–3	1–0	0–0	0–1	3–2	3–0	2–0	—	0–0	0–1	3–0	2–0
Sant Andreu	1–0	2–1	1–1	3–0	2–0	0–0	1–0	1–2	0–0	1–0	2–2	1–0	1–0	0–1	1–1	2–1	2–0	—	1–0	1–1	2–0
Valencia Mestalla	0–2	0–1	1–1	1–1	0–2	0–0	1–3	0–0	0–2	2–2	0–2	4–0	1–1	2–0	1–0	4–1	1–3	1–1	—	1–0	2–1
Villarreal B	1–2	1–1	1–0	3–1	4–1	0–2	3–1	2–1	3–3	1–1	4–0	2–0	2–1	1–1	3–3	1–5	4–1	2–2	5–2	—	2–1
Yeclano	1–3	1–1	1–2	1–0	2–1	2–2	0–2	1–2	0–2	2–2	0–3	1–1	0–1	2–2	1–1	0–2	3–1	1–1	1–1	2–2	—

Source: BDFutbol
Legend: Blue = home team win; Yellow = draw; Red = away team win.

=== Top goalscorers ===
Last updated 19 May 2013

Goalscorers	Goals	Team
(Spain) Sergio Cirio	21	L'Hospitalet
(Spain) Roger Martí	19	Levante B
(Spain) Marc Jiménez	17	Nàstic Tarragona
(Spain) Sergio León	17	Reus Deportiu
(Spain) Edgar Hernández	17	Sant Andreu

=== Top goalkeepers ===
Last updated 19 May 2013

Goalkeeper	Goals	Matches	Average	Team
(Spain) Francis Solar	15	34	0.44	Olímpic Xàtiva
(Spain) Paco Fernández	20	37	0.54	Huracán Valencia
(Spain) Carlos Craviotto	27	38	0.71	L'Hospitalet
(Spain) Unai Alba	33	40	0.83	Alcoyano
(Spain) Rubén Pérez	32	38	0.84	Nàstic Tarragona

== Group 4 ==
=== Stadia and locations ===
Location of teams in Segunda División B Gr. 4 2012–13

Team	Founded	Home city	Stadium	Capacity
Albacete	1940	Albacete, Castile-La Mancha	Carlos Belmonte	17,300
Almería B	2001	Almería, Andalusia	Juegos del Mediterraneo	23,000
Arroyo	1968	Arroyo de la Luz, Extremadura	Municipal	3,000
At. Sanluqueño	1948	Sanlúcar de Barrameda, Andalusia	El Palmar	5,000
Betis B	1962	Seville, Andalusia	Ciudad Deportiva	4,000
Cacereño	1919	Cáceres, Extremadura	Príncipe Felipe	7,000
Cádiz	1910	Cádiz, Andalusia	Ramón de Carranza	20,000
Cartagena	1995	Cartagena, Region of Murcia	Cartagonova	15,000
Écija	1968	Écija, Andalusia	San Pablo	6,000
Real Jaén	1922	Jaén, Andalusia	Nuevo La Victoria	12,000
La Roda	1999	La Roda, Castilla-La Mancha	Estadio Municipal	3,000
Linense	1912	La Línea de la Concepción, Andalusia	Municipal de La Línea	12,000
Loja	1969	Loja, Granada, Andalusia	Medina Lauxa	1,500
Lucena	1986	Lucena, Andalusia	Municipal de Lucena	6,000
Melilla	1976	Melilla	Álvarez Claro	12,000
San Fernando	2009	San Fernando, Cádiz, Andalusia	Iberoamericano	12,000
San Roque	1956	Lepe, Andalusia	Ciudad de Lepe	3,500
Sevilla Atlético	1958	Seville, Andalusia	Ciudad Deportiva	7,000
UCAM Murcia	2011	Sangonera la Verde, Region of Murcia	El Mayayo	2,500
Villanovense	1992	Villanueva de la Serena, Extremadura	Romero Cuerda	6,000

=== League table ===
Pos	Team	Pld	W	D	L	GF	GA	GD	Pts	Qualification or relegation
1	Real Jaén (C, P)	38	20	10	8	44	24	+20	70	Qualification for Play-Off
2	Cartagena	38	19	11	8	52	33	+19	68	Qualification for Play-Off
3	Albacete	38	16	13	9	45	32	+13	61	Qualification for Play-Off
4	Lucena	38	16	11	11	47	38	+9	59 (Note: LUC 4–2 AlmB; AlmB 1–0 LUC)	Qualification for Play-Off
5	Almería B	38	16	11	11	52	46	+6	59	
6	Linense	38	16	10	12	48	45	+3	58	Qualification for 2013–14 Copa del Rey
7	San Fernando	38	13	17	8	45	39	+6	56	Qualification for 2013–14 Copa del Rey
8	Écija	38	12	17	9	47	38	+9	53 (Note: MEL 1–1 ECJ; ECJ 2–2 MEL)	
9	Melilla	38	14	11	13	38	37	+1	53	
10	La Roda	38	13	13	12	39	36	+3	52	
11	Atlético Sanluqueño	38	12	14	12	49	46	+3	50	
12	Cacereño	38	11	15	12	40	36	+4	48 (Note: CAC 2–0 CÁD; CÁD 1–0 CAC)	
13	Cádiz	38	13	9	16	40	38	+2	48	
14	Sevilla Atlético	38	13	7	18	42	53	−11	46	
15	Arroyo	38	10	15	13	32	40	−8	45	
16	Villanovense (R)	38	9	16	13	32	46	−14	43	Qualification for Play-out
17	UCAM Murcia (R)	38	9	14	15	35	41	−6	41	Relegation to 2013–14 Tercera División
18	San Roque (R)	38	9	11	18	47	58	−11	38 (Note: SRQ 4–1 LOJ; LOJ 1–3 SRQ)	Relegation to 2013–14 Tercera División
19	Loja (R)	38	9	11	18	30	54	−24	38	Relegation to 2013–14 Tercera División
20	Betis B (R)	38	6	12	20	38	62	−24	30	Relegation to 2013–14 Tercera División

Source: futbolme
Rules for classification: 1) points; 2) head-to-head points; 3) head-to-head goal difference; 4) head-to-head goals scored; 5) goal difference; 6) number of goals scored.
(C) Champions; (P) Promoted; (R) Relegated

=== Results ===
Home \ Away	ALB	ALM	ARR	SLU	RBB	CAC	CÁD	CTG	ECJ	RJN	ROD	LIN	LOJ	LUC	MEL	SFE	SRQ	SAT	CMU	VNV
Albacete	—	2–2	1–1	3–1	1–1	1–0	1–0	0–2	0–1	2–0	1–1	1–2	1–0	1–1	3–2	1–1	2–1	1–0	2–0	0–0
Almería B	2–1	—	0–0	2–1	4–1	0–0	1–0	0–1	1–1	1–1	5–2	0–1	1–1	1–0	0–2	0–0	3–2	4–2	0–2	3–1
Arroyo	2–1	1–0	—	1–0	0–1	1–1	0–2	0–1	1–0	0–0	1–1	3–1	0–0	0–2	2–0	0–0	0–0	0–1	0–0	2–2
Atlético Sanluqueño	1–0	3–1	2–0	—	3–1	3–2	0–3	0–2	1–1	1–0	3–0	5–1	1–0	3–2	2–0	0–2	2–2	2–2	2–2	3–3
Betis B	1–2	3–0	1–1	1–0	—	0–3	0–2	1–1	0–0	0–0	1–1	2–3	2–2	3–2	1–3	3–1	2–3	0–0	2–2	0–2
Cacereño	0–0	1–1	2–1	1–1	2–0	—	2–0	1–2	0–0	0–2	2–1	1–1	1–1	1–1	0–0	0–1	4–0	0–1	2–1	3–0
Cádiz	0–2	1–2	2–5	1–0	2–0	1–0	—	3–0	0–1	0–1	0–0	3–1	3–0	0–0	0–1	0–0	2–2	1–2	2–2	1–0
Cartagena	3–2	2–2	1–2	2–1	1–1	2–0	2–0	—	3–0	2–0	1–2	2–0	1–0	2–0	2–0	1–1	0–0	2–3	1–1	0–1
Écija	0–0	1–0	1–1	1–1	5–2	1–1	2–0	0–1	—	1–1	1–1	1–0	2–1	0–2	2–2	1–2	3–3	6–0	0–2	2–2
Real Jaén	1–1	3–0	3–2	1–0	1–0	0–0	2–1	1–0	2–1	—	0–0	2–0	2–2	3–1	1–2	1–0	3–2	1–0	2–0	5–0
La Roda	0–0	0–2	0–0	2–0	1–0	3–0	0–0	2–3	0–1	0–1	—	1–2	0–1	1–0	2–0	1–1	2–2	2–0	1–0	2–2
Linense	0–0	1–2	2–1	1–0	2–1	0–1	1–1	0–1	3–0	0–1	1–1	—	4–1	2–0	0–0	1–2	2–1	2–0	2–1	0–0
Loja	1–1	0–3	0–2	0–0	2–1	1–1	1–3	0–2	0–0	2–0	1–0	1–1	—	0–0	0–1	1–4	1–3	1–0	2–0	1–0
Lucena	2–4	4–2	5–0	1–1	1–0	1–0	2–0	2–1	0–0	1–0	1–0	0–2	2–0	—	1–0	2–1	1–1	0–2	2–2	2–0
Melilla	1–0	2–2	2–0	0–0	1–0	2–1	0–2	1–1	1–1	1–0	0–1	1–1	0–1	1–1	—	4–0	1–0	0–1	0–1	1–1
San Fernando	0–1	2–0	0–0	3–3	2–1	3–2	1–1	2–0	0–0	0–0	2–1	2–2	2–1	0–0	1–2	—	3–2	2–1	0–0	0–0
San Roque	1–2	0–2	1–0	1–1	0–3	0–0	0–1	0–0	3–2	0–1	0–3	1–2	4–1	1–0	4–0	1–1	—	1–0	2–0	3–4
Sevilla Atlético	0–2	0–0	3–0	0–0	4–0	1–2	3–2	2–2	0–3	1–0	0–1	5–3	2–3	2–3	0–3	1–1	1–0	—	0–1	2–0
UCAM Murcia	1–0	1–2	1–2	0–1	1–1	1–1	0–0	2–2	1–2	0–0	0–1	0–1	1–0	1–2	1–1	2–1	2–0	2–0	—	0–1
Villanovense	0–2	0–1	0–0	1–1	1–1	1–2	1–0	0–0	0–3	0–2	1–2	0–0	3–0	0–0	1–0	2–1	1–0	0–0	1–1	—

Source: BDFutbol
Legend: Blue = home team win; Yellow = draw; Red = away team win.

=== Top goalscorers ===
Last updated 19 May 2013

Goalscorers	Goals	Team
(Spain) David Hernández	21	Linense
(France) Florian Taulemesse	19	Cartagena
(Spain) Pedro Carrión	14	San Fernando
(Spain) Antonio Megías	14	La Roda
(Spain) Víctor Curto	13	Albacete

=== Top goalkeepers ===
Last updated 19 May 2013

Goalkeeper	Goals	Matches	Average	Team
(Spain) Víctor Ibáñez	16	27	0.59	Cartagena
(Spain) Toni García	24	37	0.65	Real Jaén
(Spain) Álvaro Campos	23	32	0.72	Albacete
(Spain) Víctor Bocanegra	26	31	0.84	La Roda
(Spain) David Valle	27	29	0.93	San Fernando

== See also ==
- 2012–13 Segunda División
- 2013 Segunda División B play-offs
- 2012–13 Tercera División
- 2012–13 Copa del Rey
