= 2025–26 La Liga =

95th season of La Liga

La Liga
- Season: 2025–26
- Dates: 15 August 2025 – 24 May 2026
- Champions: Barcelona; 29th title
- Relegated: Mallorca; Girona; Oviedo
- Champions League: Barcelona; Real Madrid; Villarreal; Atlético Madrid; Real Betis
- Europa League: Real Sociedad (as Copa del Rey winners); Celta Vigo
- Conference League: Getafe
- Matches: 380
- Goals: 1,024 (2.69 per match)
- Best player: Lamine Yamal
- Top goalscorer: Kylian Mbappé (25 goals)
- Best goalkeeper: Joan Garcia (0.70 goals/match)
- Biggest home win: Barcelona 6–0 Valencia (14 September 2025)
- Biggest away win: Girona 0–4 Levante (20 September 2025)
- Highest scoring: Real Betis 3–5 Barcelona (6 December 2025)
- Longest winning run: Barcelona (11 matches)
- Longest unbeaten run: Atlético Madrid (13 matches)
- Longest winless run: Espanyol (18 matches)
- Longest losing run: Levante (5 matches)
- Highest attendance: 78,107; Real Madrid 2–1 Barcelona (26 October 2025)
- Lowest attendance: 5,335; Rayo Vallecano 3–0 Atlético Madrid (15 February 2026)
- Total attendance: 11,758,696
- Average attendance: 30,944

The 2025–26 La Liga, also known as La Liga EA Sports due to sponsorship reasons, was the 95th season of La Liga, Spain's top-flight football competition. It began on 15 August 2025 and ended on 24 May 2026. The match schedule was published on 1 July 2025. Barcelona were the defending champions, having won their 28th title the previous season.

On 10 May 2026, Barcelona officially secured their second consecutive title with three matches to spare following a 2–0 win against El Clásico rivals Real Madrid.

== Teams ==
Location of teams in 2025–26 La Liga
Location of Community of Madrid teams in 2025–26 La Liga

=== Promotion and relegation (pre-season) ===
A total of twenty teams contested the league, including seventeen sides from the 2024–25 season and three promoted from the 2024–25 Segunda División. This included the two top teams from the Segunda División, and the winners of the promotion play-offs.

Teams relegated to Segunda División

The first team to be relegated from La Liga were Valladolid, after a 1–5 loss to Real Betis on 25 April 2025, after only a single season stay in the top tier. The second team to be relegated was Las Palmas, after a 0–1 loss to Sevilla on 14 May 2025, after two seasons in the top tier. The third and final team relegated to Segunda was Leganés, after just one season in the top tier, after Espanyol managed to survive by beating Las Palmas on the last matchday.

Teams promoted from Segunda División

On 25 May 2025, Levante became the first side to be promoted, returning after a three-year absence following a 3–2 victory against Burgos. Elche became the second team to be promoted on the last day after defeating Deportivo La Coruña 4–0, returning after a two-year absence. The final team promoted was Oviedo after overcoming Mirandés 3–2 on aggregate in the promotion play-off final on 21 June to return to the top division after a twenty four-year absence.

Promoted from 2024–25 Segunda División	Relegated from 2024–25 La Liga
Levante; Elche; Oviedo	Leganés; Las Palmas; Valladolid

=== Stadiums and locations ===
Team	Location	Stadium	Capacity
Alavés	Vitoria-Gasteiz	Campo de Fútbol de Mendizorrotza	19,840
Athletic Bilbao	Bilbao	Estadio San Mamés	53,289
Atlético Madrid	Madrid	Estadio Riyadh Air Metropolitano	70,692
Barcelona	Sant Joan Despí	Estadi Johan Cruyff	6,000
Barcelona	Barcelona	Olímpic Lluís Companys	55,926
Barcelona	Barcelona	Camp Nou	105,000
Celta Vigo	Vigo	Estadio ABANCA Balaídos	24,870
Elche	Elche	Estadio Martínez Valero	31,388
Espanyol	Cornellà de Llobregat	RCDE Stadium	37,776
Getafe	Getafe	Estadio Coliseum	16,500
Girona	Girona	Estadio Municipal de Montilivi	14,624
Levante	Valencia	Estadio Ciutat de València	26,354
Mallorca	Palma	Estadi Mallorca Son Moix	23,142
Osasuna	Pamplona	Estadio El Sadar	23,576
Oviedo	Oviedo	Estadio Carlos Tartiere	30,500
Rayo Vallecano	Madrid	El Campo de Fútbol de Vallecas	14,708
Rayo Vallecano	Leganés	Estadio Ontime Butarque (Note: Rayo Vallecano played at the Butarque Stadium against Atlético Madrid due to the poor condition of the pitch at Vallecas.)	12,450
Real Betis	Seville	Estadio Olímpico de la Cartuja	70,000
Real Madrid	Madrid	Bernabéu Stadium	83,186
Real Sociedad	San Sebastián	Reale Arena	39,313
Sevilla	Seville	Estadio Ramón Sánchez-Pizjuán	43,883
Valencia	Valencia	Camp de Mestalla	49,430
Villarreal	Villarreal	Estadio de la Cerámica	23,008

=== Personnel and sponsorship ===
Team	Manager	Captain	Kit manufacturer	Main kit sponsor	Other kit sponsor(s)
Alavés	(Spain) Quique Sánchez Flores	(Spain) Antonio Sivera	Puma	MK TIYU NEWS	List: Side: None; Back: Kutxabank; Sleeves: EBPay; Shorts: None
Athletic Bilbao	(Spain) Ernesto Valverde	(Ghana) Iñaki Williams	Castore	Kutxabank	List: Side: None; Back: Digi; Sleeves: B2BinPAY; Shorts: Vueling
Atlético Madrid	(Argentina) Diego Simeone	(Spain) Koke	Nike	Riyadh Air	List: Side: None; Back: Visit Rwanda; Sleeves: Kraken; Shorts: ComAve
Barcelona	(Germany) Hansi Flick	(Uruguay) Ronald Araújo	Nike	Spotify	List: Side: None; Back: UNHCR; Sleeves: Ambilight TV; Shorts: None
Celta Vigo	(Spain) Claudio Giráldez	(Spain) Iago Aspas	Hummel	Estrella Galicia	List: Side: None; Back: Abanca; Sleeves: JP Financial; Shorts: Sygna by Siweb, Grupo Recalvi
Elche	(Spain) Eder Sarabia	(Spain) Pedro Bigas	Nike	Vega Fibra	List: Side: None; Back: Kosner; Sleeves: MGS Seguros; Shorts: Next Energía
Espanyol	(Spain) Manolo González	(Spain) Javi Puado	Kelme	Dani	List: Side: None; Back: Lowi; Sleeves: None; Shorts: Škoda
Getafe	(Spain) José Bordalás	(Togo) Djené	Joma	Tecnocasa	List: Side: None; Back: Lowi; Sleeves: ODTY News; Shorts: Mapei, Grand Class
Girona	(Spain) Míchel	(Uruguay) Cristhian Stuani	Puma	Etihad Airways	List: Side: None; Back: Marlex; Sleeves: HYLO; Shorts: None
Levante	(Portugal) Luís Castro	(Spain) Pablo Martínez	Macron	Marcos Automoción	List: Side: None; Back: Baleària, Lowi; Sleeves: Levante Blau Home; Shorts: None
Mallorca	(Argentina) Martín Demichelis	(Spain) Antonio Raíllo	Nike	αGEL	List: Side: None; Back: Juaneda Hospitales, Alua Hotels & Resorts; Sleeves: OK Mobility; Shorts: Air Europa, Illes Balears
Osasuna	(Italy) Alessio Lisci	(Spain) Kike Barja	Macron	Kosner	List: Side: None; Back: Digi; Sleeves: Celer Light; Shorts: Clínica Universidad de Navarra, Crypto Fund Trader
Oviedo	(Uruguay) Guillermo Almada	(Spain) Santi Cazorla	Adidas	Digi	List: Side: Oviedo, origen del Camino; Back: Central Lechera Asturiana, Hyundai Asturdai; Sleeves: Integra Energía; Shorts: Guanajuato Vive Grandes Historias, DEXTools
Rayo Vallecano	(Spain) Iñigo Pérez	(Spain) Óscar Valentín	Umbro	Digi	List: Side: None; Back: None; Sleeves: GCS; Shorts: None
Real Betis	(Chile) Manuel Pellegrini	(Spain) Isco	Hummel	Gree Electric	List: Side: None; Back: Prima Seguros, Trainline; Sleeves: Drive REVEL; Shorts: AUS Global
Real Madrid	(Spain) Álvaro Arbeloa	(Spain) Dani Carvajal	Adidas	Emirates	List: Side: None; Back: None; Sleeves: HP Inc.; Shorts: None
Real Sociedad	(United States) Pellegrino Matarazzo	(Spain) Mikel Oyarzabal	Macron	Baghdadi Capital	List: Side: None; Back: Kutxabank; Sleeves: None; Shorts: Sygna
Sevilla	(Spain) Luis García	(Serbia) Nemanja Gudelj	Adidas	Midea	List: Side: None; Back: Socios.com; Sleeves: JD Sports; Shorts: Juice Time
Valencia	(Spain) Carlos Corberán	(Spain) José Gayà	Puma	TM Real Estate Group	List: Side: None; Back: None; Sleeves: Divina Seguros; Shorts: Škoda
Villarreal	(Spain) Marcelino	(Spain) Gerard Moreno	Joma	Pamesa Cerámica	List: Side: None; Back: Ascale; Sleeves: None; Shorts: None

=== "Retro Matchday" ===
The season featured the first "Retro Matchday" in the history of La Liga, where teams wore specially designed retro kits, designed to refer to the history of each club. Of 42 teams, 38 participated, but this did not include Barcelona or Real Madrid.

=== Managerial changes ===
Team	Outgoing manager	Manner of departure	Date of vacancy	Position in table	Incoming manager	Date of appointment
Real Madrid	(Italy) Carlo Ancelotti	Signed by Brazil	25 May 2025	Pre-season	(Spain) Xabi Alonso	1 June 2025
Sevilla	(Spain) Joaquín Caparrós	End of caretaker spell	30 June 2025	Pre-season	(Argentina) Matías Almeyda	1 July 2025
Real Sociedad	(Spain) Imanol Alguacil	End of contract	30 June 2025	Pre-season	(Spain) Sergio Francisco (Note: Francisco was appointed earlier on 28 April 2025, but officially took over on 1 July 2025.)	1 July 2025
Osasuna	(Spain) Vicente Moreno	End of contract	30 June 2025	Pre-season	(Italy) Alessio Lisci	1 July 2025
Oviedo	(Serbia) Veljko Paunović	Sacked	9 October 2025	17th	(Spain) Luis Carrión	9 October 2025
Levante	(Spain) Julián Calero	Sacked	30 November 2025	19th	(Spain) Álvaro del Moral (caretaker)	30 November 2025
Real Sociedad	(Spain) Sergio Francisco	Sacked	14 December 2025	15th	(Spain) Ion Ansotegi (caretaker)	14 December 2025
Oviedo	(Spain) Luis Carrión	Sacked	14 December 2025	19th	(Uruguay) Guillermo Almada	16 December 2025
Real Sociedad	(Spain) Ion Ansotegi	End of caretaker spell	20 December 2025	16th	(United States) Pellegrino Matarazzo	20 December 2025
Levante	(Spain) Álvaro del Moral	End of caretaker spell	20 December 2025	20th	(Portugal) Luís Castro	20 December 2025
Real Madrid	(Spain) Xabi Alonso	Mutual consent	12 January 2026	2nd	(Spain) Álvaro Arbeloa	12 January 2026
Mallorca	(Spain) Jagoba Arrasate	Sacked	23 February 2026	18th	(Argentina) Martín Demichelis	26 February 2026
Alavés	(Argentina) Eduardo Coudet	Mutual consent	3 March 2026	16th	(Spain) Quique Sánchez Flores	3 March 2026
Sevilla	(Argentina) Matías Almeyda	Sacked	23 March 2026	15th	(Spain) Luis García	24 March 2026

== League table ==
Pos	Team	Pld	W	D	L	GF	GA	GD	Pts	Qualification or relegation
1	Barcelona (C)	38	31	1	6	95	36	+59	94	Qualification for the Champions League league phase (Note: La Liga gained an additional Champions League place as a result of Spain gaining one of the two European Performance Spots (EPS) awarded to the two associations with the highest UEFA coefficient points in 2025–26.)
2	Real Madrid	38	27	5	6	77	35	+42	86	Qualification for the Champions League league phase
3	Villarreal	38	22	6	10	72	46	+26	72	Qualification for the Champions League league phase
4	Atlético Madrid	38	21	6	11	62	44	+18	69	Qualification for the Champions League league phase
5	Real Betis	38	15	15	8	59	48	+11	60	Qualification for the Champions League league phase
6	Celta Vigo	38	14	12	12	53	48	+5	54	Qualification for the Europa League league phase
7	Getafe	38	15	6	17	32	38	−6	51	Qualification for the Conference League play-off round
8	Rayo Vallecano	38	12	14	12	41	44	−3	50	
9	Valencia	38	13	10	15	46	55	−9	49	
10	Real Sociedad	38	11	13	14	59	61	−2	46 (Note: Tied on head-to-head points and goal difference. Real Sociedad placed ahead of Espanyol on overall goal difference.)	Qualification for the Europa League league phase (Note: Real Sociedad qualified for the Europa League league phase as the 2025–26 Copa del Rey winners.)
11	Espanyol	38	12	10	16	43	55	−12	46	
12	Athletic Bilbao	38	13	6	19	43	58	−15	45	
13	Sevilla	38	12	7	19	46	60	−14	43 (Note: Head-to-head points: Sevilla 6, Alavés 5, Elche 3.)	
14	Alavés	38	11	10	17	44	56	−12	43	
15	Elche	38	10	13	15	49	57	−8	43	
16	Levante	38	11	9	18	47	61	−14	42 (Note: Head-to-head points: Levante 7, Osasuna 5, Mallorca 3.)	
17	Osasuna	38	11	9	18	44	50	−6	42	
18	Mallorca (R)	38	11	9	18	47	57	−10	42	Relegation to Segunda División
19	Girona (R)	38	9	14	15	39	55	−16	41	Relegation to Segunda División
20	Oviedo (R)	38	6	11	21	26	60	−34	29	Relegation to Segunda División

Source: LaLiga EA Sports
Rules for classification: 1) Points; 2) Head-to-head points; 3) Head-to-head goal difference; 4) Goal difference; 5) Goals scored; 6) Fair-play points
(Note: Head-to-head record is used only after all the matches between the teams in question have been played)
(C) Champions; (R) Relegated

== Results ==
Home \ Away	ALA	ATH	ATM	BAR	CEL	ELC	ESP	GET	GIR	LEV	MLL	OSA	OVD	RAY	BET	RMA	RSO	SEV	VAL	VIL
Alavés	—	2–4	1–1	1–0	0–1	3–1	2–1	0–2	2–2	2–1	2–1	2–2	1–1	1–2	2–1	1–2	1–0	1–2	0–0	1–1
Athletic Bilbao	0–1	—	1–0	0–1	1–1	2–1	1–2	0–1	1–1	4–2	2–1	1–0	1–0	1–0	2–1	0–3	1–1	3–2	0–1	1–2
Atlético Madrid	1–0	3–2	—	1–2	0–1	1–1	4–2	1–0	1–0	3–1	3–0	1–0	2–0	3–2	0–1	5–2	3–2	3–0	2–1	2–0
Barcelona	3–1	4–0	3–1	—	1–0	3–1	4–1	3–0	2–1	3–0	3–0	2–0	3–0	1–0	3–1	2–0	2–1	5–2	6–0	4–1
Celta Vigo	3–4	2–0	1–1	2–4	—	3–1	0–1	0–2	1–1	2–3	2–0	1–2	0–3	3–0	1–1	1–2	1–1	1–0	4–1	1–1
Elche	1–1	0–0	3–2	1–3	2–1	—	2–2	1–0	3–0	2–0	2–1	0–0	1–0	4–0	1–1	2–2	1–1	2–2	1–0	1–3
Espanyol	1–2	2–0	2–1	0–2	2–2	1–0	—	1–2	0–2	0–0	3–2	1–0	1–1	1–0	1–2	0–2	1–1	2–1	2–2	0–2
Getafe	1–1	2–0	0–1	0–2	0–0	1–0	0–1	—	2–1	1–1	3–1	1–0	2–0	0–2	2–0	0–1	1–2	0–1	0–1	2–1
Girona	1–0	3–0	0–3	2–1	1–2	1–1	0–0	1–1	—	0–4	0–1	1–0	3–3	1–3	2–3	1–1	1–1	0–2	2–1	1–0
Levante	2–0	0–2	0–0	2–3	1–2	3–2	1–1	1–0	1–1	—	2–0	3–2	4–2	0–3	2–2	1–4	1–1	2–0	0–2	0–1
Mallorca	1–0	3–2	1–1	0–3	1–1	3–1	2–1	1–0	1–2	1–1	—	2–2	3–0	3–0	1–2	2–1	0–1	4–1	1–1	1–1
Osasuna	3–0	1–1	1–2	1–2	2–3	1–1	1–2	2–1	1–0	2–0	2–2	—	3–2	2–0	1–1	2–1	1–3	2–1	1–0	2–2
Oviedo	0–1	1–2	0–1	1–3	0–0	1–2	0–2	0–0	1–0	0–2	0–0	0–0	—	0–0	1–1	0–3	1–0	1–0	1–0	1–1
Rayo Vallecano	1–0	1–1	3–0	1–1	1–1	1–0	1–0	1–1	1–1	1–1	2–1	1–3	3–0	—	0–0	0–0	3–3	0–1	1–1	2–0
Real Betis	1–0	1–2	0–2	3–5	1–1	2–1	0–0	4–0	1–1	2–1	3–0	2–0	3–0	1–1	—	1–1	3–1	2–2	2–1	2–0
Real Madrid	2–1	4–2	3–2	2–1	0–2	4–1	2–0	0–1	1–1	2–0	2–1	1–0	2–0	2–1	5–1	—	4–1	2–0	4–0	3–1
Real Sociedad	3–3	3–2	1–1	2–1	3–1	3–1	2–2	0–1	1–2	2–0	1–0	3–1	3–3	0–1	2–2	1–2	—	2–1	3–4	2–3
Sevilla	1–1	2–1	2–1	4–1	0–1	2–2	2–1	1–2	1–1	0–3	1–3	1–0	4–0	1–1	0–2	0–1	1–0	—	0–2	1–2
Valencia	3–2	2–0	0–2	3–1	2–3	1–1	3–2	3–0	2–1	1–0	1–1	1–0	1–2	1–1	1–1	0–2	1–1	1–1	—	0–2
Villarreal	3–1	1–0	5–1	0–2	2–1	2–1	4–1	2–0	5–0	5–1	2–1	2–1	2–0	4–0	2–2	0–2	3–1	2–3	2–1	—

Source: La Liga
Legend: Blue = home team win; Yellow = draw; Red = away team win.
For upcoming matches, an "a" indicates there is an article about the rivalry between the two participants.

=== Rescheduled matches ===
Round	Home team	Away team	Original date	New date	Reason
6	Celta Vigo	Real Betis	20 September 2025	27 August 2025	Match was rescheduled due to a clash with Celta Vigo's and Real Betis' Europa League fixtures against VfB Stuttgart and Nottingham Forest, respectively.
16	Levante	Villarreal	14 December 2025	17 February 2026	Match was postponed due to heavy rainfall.
19	Barcelona	Atlético Madrid	11 January 2026	2 December 2025	Match was rescheduled due to both teams playing in the Supercopa de España on the original matchday.
19	Athletic Bilbao	Real Madrid	11 January 2026	3 December 2025	Match was rescheduled due to both teams playing in the Supercopa de España on the original matchday.
23	Sevilla	Girona	7 February 2026	8 February 2026	Match was postponed due to heavy rainfall.
23	Rayo Vallecano	Oviedo	7 February 2026	4 March 2026	Match was postponed due to poor pitch conditions.

== Season statistics ==
=== Scoring ===
- First goal of the season:
  (Spain) Jorge de Frutos (Rayo Vallecano) against Girona (16 August 2025)
- Last goal of the season:
  (Spain) Ayoze Pérez (Villarreal) against Atlético Madrid (24 May 2026)

=== Top goalscorers ===
Rank	Player	Club	Goals
1	(France) Kylian Mbappé	Real Madrid	25
2	(Kosovo) Vedat Muriqi	Mallorca	23
3	(Croatia) Ante Budimir	Osasuna	17
4	(Spain) Ferran Torres	Barcelona	16
4	(Brazil) Vinícius Júnior	Real Madrid	16
4	(Spain) Lamine Yamal	Barcelona	16
7	(Spain) Mikel Oyarzabal	Real Sociedad	15
8	(Spain) Borja Iglesias	Celta Vigo	14
8	(Poland) Robert Lewandowski	Barcelona	14
8	(Spain) Toni Martínez	Alavés	14

=== Hat-tricks ===
Player	For	Against	Result	Date	Round
(Canada) Tajon Buchanan	Villarreal	Girona	5–0 (H)	24 August 2025	2
(Argentina) Julián Alvarez	Atlético Madrid	Rayo Vallecano	3–2 (H)	24 September 2025	6
(Poland) Robert Lewandowski	Barcelona	Celta Vigo	4–2 (A)	9 November 2025	12
(Spain) Ferran Torres	Barcelona	Real Betis	5–3 (A)	6 December 2025	15
(Spain) Gonzalo García	Real Madrid	Real Betis	5–1 (H)	4 January 2026	18
(Kosovo) Vedat Muriqi	Mallorca	Athletic Bilbao	3–2 (H)	17 January 2026	20
(Spain) Lamine Yamal	Barcelona	Villarreal	4–1 (H)	28 February 2026	26
(Brazil) Raphinha	Barcelona	Sevilla	5–2 (H)	15 March 2026	28

=== Zamora Trophy ===
The Zamora Trophy was awarded by newspaper Marca to the goalkeeper with the lowest goals-to-games ratio. A goalkeeper had to play at least 28 matches of 60 or more minutes to be eligible for the trophy.

Rank	Player	Club	Matches	Goals against	Average
1	(Spain) Joan Garcia	Barcelona	30	21	0.70
2	(Belgium) Thibaut Courtois	Real Madrid	32	28	0.88
3	(Spain) David Soria	Getafe	38	38	1.00
4	(Slovenia) Jan Oblak	Atlético Madrid	30	31	1.03
5	(Brazil) Luiz Júnior	Villarreal	28	30	1.07

=== Discipline ===
==== Player ====
- Most yellow cards: 13
  - (Spain) José Ángel Carmona (Sevilla)
- Most red cards: 3
  - (Uruguay) Federico Viñas (Oviedo)

==== Team ====
- Most yellow cards: 105
  - Sevilla
- Fewest yellow cards: 59
  - Barcelona
- Most red cards: 10
  - Oviedo
- Fewest red cards: 1
  - Celta Vigo

== Awards ==
=== Monthly awards ===
Month	Manager of the Month		Player of the Month		U23 Player of the Month		Goal of the Month			Save of the Month			References
Month	Manager	Club	Player	Club	Player	Club	Player	Club	Against	Player	Club	Against	References
August	(Spain) Xabi Alonso	Real Madrid	(Ivory Coast) Nicolas Pépé	Villarreal	(Spain) Adrián Liso	Getafe	(Spain) Pedri	Barcelona	Levante	(Spain) Joan Garcia	Barcelona	Rayo Vallecano	
September	(Spain) Eder Sarabia	Elche	(France) Kylian Mbappé	Real Madrid	(Turkey) Arda Güler	Real Madrid	(Brazil) Éder Militão	Real Madrid	Espanyol	(Spain) Sergio Herrera	Osasuna	Villarreal	
October	(Spain) Iñigo Pérez	Rayo Vallecano	(France) Kylian Mbappé	Real Madrid	(Spain) Alberto Moleiro	Villarreal	(Portugal) Samú Costa	Mallorca	Athletic Bilbao	(Slovenia) Jan Oblak	Atlético Madrid	Osasuna	
November	(Spain) Marcelino	Villarreal	(Spain) Lamine Yamal	Barcelona	(Spain) Alberto Moleiro	Villarreal	(Spain) Nico Williams	Athletic Bilbao	Oviedo	(Spain) David Soria	Getafe	Atlético Madrid	
December	(Spain) Manolo González	Espanyol	(Spain) Lamine Yamal	Barcelona	(Sweden) Williot Swedberg	Celta Vigo	(Spain) Héctor Fort	Elche	Rayo Vallecano	(Slovenia) Jan Oblak	Atlético Madrid	Girona	
January	(United States) Pellegrino Matarazzo	Real Sociedad	(Kosovo) Vedat Muriqi	Mallorca	(Brazil) Vitor Reis	Girona	(Spain) Gonzalo García	Real Madrid	Real Betis	(Spain) Joan Garcia	Barcelona	Espanyol	
February	(Chile) Manuel Pellegrini	Real Betis	(Georgia (country)) Georges Mikautadze	Villarreal	(Spain) Víctor Muñoz	Osasuna	(Belgium) Largie Ramazani	Valencia	Levante	(Greece) Odysseas Vlachodimos	Sevilla	Girona	
March	(Germany) Hansi Flick	Barcelona	(Spain) Carlos Espí	Levante	(Spain) Víctor Muñoz	Osasuna	(Turkey) Arda Güler	Real Madrid	Elche	(Serbia) Marko Dmitrović	Espanyol	Mallorca	
April	(Argentina) Martín Demichelis	Mallorca	(Spain) Lamine Yamal	Barcelona	(Spain) Pau Cubarsí	Barcelona	(England) Marcus Rashford	Barcelona	Espanyol	(Argentina) Paulo Gazzaniga	Girona	Real Madrid	

=== Annual awards ===
Award	Winner	Club	Ref.
Coach of the Season	(Germany) Hansi Flick	Barcelona	
Player of the Season	(Spain) Lamine Yamal	Barcelona	
U23 Player of the Season	(Spain) Carlos Espí	Levante	
Goal of the Season	(Turkey) Arda Güler	Real Madrid	
Save of the Season	(Spain) Joan Garcia	Barcelona	

EA SPORTS Team of the Season
Pos.	Player	Club
GK	(Spain) **Joan Garcia**	Barcelona
GK	(Belgium) Thibaut Courtois	Real Madrid
DF	(Uruguay) **Santiago Mouriño**	Villarreal
DF	(Spain) **Eric García**	Barcelona
DF	(Spain) **Marcos Llorente**	Atlético Madrid
DF	(Spain) **Carlos Romero**	Espanyol
DF	(Spain) Pau Cubarsí	Barcelona
DF	(Spain) Marc Pubill	Atlético Madrid
MF	(Spain) **Pedri**	Barcelona
MF	(Spain) Fermín López	Barcelona
MF	(Uruguay) **Federico Valverde**	Real Madrid
MF	(France) **Aurélien Tchouaméni**	Real Madrid
MF	(Turkey) Arda Güler	Real Madrid
MF	(Spain) Alberto Moleiro	Villarreal
MF	(Spain) Pablo Barrios	Atlético Madrid
MF	(Spain) Luis Milla	Getafe
MF	(Spain) Pablo Fornals	Real Betis
FW	(Spain) **Lamine Yamal**	Barcelona
FW	(Kosovo) **Vedat Muriqi**	Mallorca
FW	(France) **Kylian Mbappé**	Real Madrid
FW	(Brazil) Raphinha	Barcelona
FW	(Spain) Mikel Oyarzabal	Real Sociedad

Players in bold are the main eleven.

== Attendances ==
La Liga clubs listed by average home league attendance in the 2025–26 season:

Rank	Club	Average attendance
1	Real Madrid	71,549
2	Atlético Madrid	60,855
3	Real Betis	57,427
4	Athletic Bilbao	47,622
5	Barcelona	45,099
6	Valencia	44,699
7	Sevilla	35,688
8	Real Sociedad	30,697
9	Espanyol	28,646
10	Elche	26,434
11	Oviedo	24,625
12	Osasuna	20,560
13	Levante	20,317
14	Celta Vigo	20,007
15	Villarreal	17,987
16	Mallorca	17,737
17	Alavés	16,801
18	Rayo Vallecano	12,016
19	Girona	11,931
20	Getafe	8,196

== See also ==
- 2025–26 Copa del Rey
- 2025–26 Segunda División
- 2025–26 Primera Federación
- 2025–26 Segunda Federación
- 2025–26 Tercera Federación
