= Víctor Marco =

Spanish footballer

Personal information
- Full name: Víctor Marco Soler
- Date of birth: 14 June 1982 (age 44)
- Place of birth: Valencia, Spain
- Height: 1.85 m (6 ft 1 in)
- Position: Defender

Youth career
- Levante

Senior career*
Years	Team	Apps	(Gls)
2001–2004	Levante B		
2004–2006	Conquense	41	(1)
2006–2007	Mérida	30	(0)
2007–2008	Lleida	14	(0)
2008–2009	Roquetas	24	(0)
2009–2010	Villanovense	9	(0)
2010–2015	Lugo	139	(5)
2015	Huracán	7	(1)
2016–2017	Mensajero	46	(1)
2017–2019	Torre Levante	62	(4)
Total		372	(12)
- * Club domestic league appearances and goals

Víctor Marco Soler (born 14 June 1982 in Valencia) is a Spanish former professional footballer who played mainly as a central defender but also as a left back.
