= Luís Castro (football manager) =

- Luís Castro (footballer, born 1961), Portuguese football manager
- Luís Castro (football manager, born 1980), Portuguese football manager
