= Álvaro del Moral =

Spanish footballer

Personal information
- Full name: Álvaro del Moral Galán
- Date of birth: 9 May 1984 (age 42)
- Place of birth: Madrid, Spain
- Height: 1.76 m (5 ft 9 in)
- Position: Forward

Team information
- Current team: Levante B (manager)

Youth career
- Villa Rosa
- Atlético Madrid

Senior career*
| Years | Team | Apps | (Gls) |
| 2003–2004 | Atlético Aviación | | |
| 2003–2007 | Atlético Madrid B | 11 | (0) |
| 2005 | → Alcalá (loan) | 18 | (3) |
| 2005–2006 | → Linares (loan) | 22 | (0) |
| 2006–2007 | → Baza (loan) | 24 | (8) |
| 2007–2008 | Benidorm | 37 | (13) |
| 2008–2010 | Levante | 26 | (1) |
| 2010–2011 | Logroñés | 33 | (4) |
| 2011–2012 | Melilla | 17 | (1) |
| 2012–2013 | Alcalá | 17 | (1) |
| 2013 | Kristianstads | 10 | (1) |
| 2014 | First Vienna | 5 | (0) |
| 2015 | Alginet | 1 | (0) |
| 2015–2016 | Ejea | 28 | (11) |
| 2016–2018 | Buñol | 29 | (8) |
| Total | | 278 | (51) |

Managerial career
- 2018–2021: Levante (youth)
- 2021–2022: Patacona (youth)
- 2022–2023: Levante B (assistant)
- 2023–2024: Levante B
- 2024–2025: Levante (youth)
- 2025–: Levante B
- 2025: Levante (caretaker)
- * Club domestic league appearances and goals

Álvaro del Moral Galán (born 9 May 1984) is a Spanish retired footballer who played as a forward, and is the current head coach of Levante B.

== Playing career ==
Born in Madrid, del Moral joined Atlético Madrid's youth sides from Villa Rosa, and made his senior debut with the C-team in Tercera División in 2003. He started to feature with the reserves in Segunda División B shortly after, but was rarely used, and subsequently served loans at fellow third division sides Alcalá, Linares and Baza.

In 2007, del Moral signed for Benidorm also in the third division, and scored a career-best 13 goals during the campaign. In August 2008, he joined Segunda División side Levante.

Del Moral made his professional debut on 7 September 2008, starting in a 2–1 away win over Real Murcia. He scored his first goal in the second division the following 12 April, netting the equalizer in a 5–1 loss to Tenerife.

Del Moral left the Granotes in 2010, after just two appearances during the season, and returned to the third division with Logroñés. He then played for fellow league teams Melilla and Alcalá before moving abroad for the first time in his career on 7 August 2013, joining Swedish side Kristianstads.

On 20 January 2014, del Moral signed a one-year contract with Austrian 2. Liga side First Vienna, but terminated his link on 2 April, after suffering a knee injury. In April 2015, after more than a year without a club, he joined Alginet in the Regional Preferente.

In August 2015, del Moral agreed to a deal with Ejea of the fourth division. Roughly one year later, he joined fellow league team Buñol, and retired with the club in 2018, aged 34, due to a tibia injury.

== Managerial career ==
Immediately after retiring, del Moral began working as a coach in the youth categories of Levante. In 2021, he was in charge of Patacona's Cadete side, before becoming an assistant of Chema Sanz at the reserves.

On 14 July 2023, del Moral was appointed manager of Atlético Levante, with former teammate Héctor Rodas as his assistant. In July of the following year, he took over the Juvenil A side, but returned to the B-team on 25 February 2025, after the sacking of Euge Ribera.

On 30 November 2025, del Moral was named caretaker manager of Levante's first team, with another teammate from his previous spell at the club, Vicente Iborra, as his assistant. He returned to his previous role on 20 December, after the appointment of Luís Castro.

== Managerial statistics ==
As of match played 20 December 2025

Managerial record by team and tenure
| Team | Nat | From | To | Record | | | | | | | | Ref |
| Team | Nat | From | To | G | W | D | L | GF | GA | GD | Win % | Ref |
|---|---|---|---|---|---|---|---|---|---|---|---|---|
| Levante B | (Spain) | 14 July 2023 | 11 July 2024 | 34 | 13 | 11 | 10 | 44 | 35 | +9 | 38.24 | |
| Levante B | (Spain) | 25 February 2025 | Present | 23 | 13 | 6 | 4 | 33 | 18 | +15 | 56.52 | |
| Levante (caretaker) | (Spain) | 30 November 2025 | 20 December 2025 | 4 | 1 | 1 | 2 | 2 | 4 | −2 | 25.00 | |
| Total | | | | 61 | 27 | 18 | 16 | 79 | 57 | +22 | 44.26 | — |
