= José Enrique Díaz =

Spanish football manager (born 1953)

Personal information
- Full name: José Enrique Díaz Barrera
- Date of birth: 7 April 1953 (age 73)
- Place of birth: Seville, Spain

Managerial career
- Years: Team
- 1982–1983: Riotinto
- 1983–1984: Sanluqueño
- 1984–1986: Betis Deportivo
- 1986–1989: Sanluqueño
- 1989–1990: Granada
- 1991: Mérida
- 1991–1992: Xerez
- 1992: Mérida
- 1992–1993: Badajoz
- 1993–1994: Levante
- 1994–1995: Almería
- 1995–1996: Écija
- 1997: Levante
- 1998: Xerez
- 2000: Cultural Leonesa
- 2000–2001: Ceuta
- 2001–2002: Cádiz
- 2003: Ceuta
- 2007–2008: Ceuta

José Enrique Díaz Barrera (born 7 April 1953) is a Spanish football manager.

== Managerial career ==
Born in Seville, Andalusia, Díaz made his managerial debut with Tercera División side Riotinto Balompié, and subsequently led Betis Deportivo to Segunda División B in 1985. After stints at Atlético Sanluqueño CF, Granada CF, CP Mérida and Xerez CD in division three, he returned to Mérida in 1992, with the club now in Segunda División.

In the 1992 summer Díaz was named CD Badajoz manager. In 1994, after a year at Levante UD, he was appointed at the helm of UD Almería and led the club to its first promotion to the second level ever.

Díaz subsequently managed Écija Balompié and Levante in the second level, being sacked by the latter on 24 November 1997. He resumed his career in the third level, managing Xerez, Cultural y Deportiva Leonesa, AD Ceuta (three spells) and Cádiz CF; he was also Andalusia Football Federation's manager for eight years.
