= Paco Fernández (footballer, born 1979) =

Spanish footballer

Paco
Personal information
- Full name: Francisco José Fernández Mas
- Date of birth: 15 March 1979 (age 47)
- Place of birth: Valencia, Spain
- Height: 1.85 m (6 ft 1 in)
- Position: Goalkeeper

Youth career
- Levante

Senior career*
Years	Team	Apps	(Gls)
1996–2005	Levante B		
1997–2005	Levante	3	(0)
1998–1999	→ Águilas (loan)	43	(0)
2000–2001	→ Novelda (loan)	8	(0)
2001–2002	→ Algeciras (loan)		
2002	→ Jerez (loan)		
2005–2008	Dénia	105	(0)
2008–2009	Alzira	38	(0)
2009–2011	Catarroja	70	(0)
2011–2015	Huracán	181	(0)
2016	Torre Levante	17	(0)
2016–2019	Olímpic Xàtiva	82	(0)
2019–2025	Buñol	145	(0)
2025-	Cheste		
- * Club domestic league appearances and goals

Francisco José Fernández Mas (born 15 March 1979), known as Paco, is a Spanish professional footballer who plays as a goalkeeper for CD Cheste.
