= Pepe Balaguer =

Spanish footballer and coach

Pep Balaguer
Personal information
- Full name: José Balaguer Berga
- Date of birth: 1 December 1950 (age 75)
- Place of birth: La Pobla de Vallbona, Spain
- Height: 1.84 m (6 ft 1/2 in)
- Position: Goalkeeper

Youth career
- Paterna CF
- Valencia

Senior career*
| Years | Team | Apps | (Gls) |
| 1971–1972 | Valencia B | 27 | (0) |
| 1972–1981 | Valencia | 94 | (0) |

Managerial career
- Valencia (youth)
- 1994–1997: Valencia B
- 1998–2002: Levante
- 2003: Gimnàstic
- 2004: Cartagena
- 2005–2006: Valencian Community
- * Club domestic league appearances and goals

José 'Pep' Balaguer Berga (born 1 December 1950) is a Spanish retired footballer who played as a goalkeeper, and is a coach.

He is well known for his long-serving career in Valencia CF, where he amassed 9 seasons in the first team. After retiring in 1981, Balaguer worked as a manager.

== Managerial career ==
Immediately after retiring Balaguer started working as a manager, initially being manager of the youth categories with Valencia CF. He was appointed head coach of Levante UD for the last 10 games of the 1997–98 season, failing to avoid relegation, however. He returned to Segunda División at his first attempt, being dismissed only in January 2002. In February 2003, he was appointed Gimnàstic de Tarragona manager.

In April 2004 Balaguer was appointed FC Cartagena manager, being relieved from his duties in October. In December 2005 he was appointed Valencian Community autonomous football team manager.
