= Atlético Levante UD =

Spanish football club

Atlético Levante
- Full name: Atlético Levante Unión Deportiva
- Nickname: Granotas
- Founded: 10 Novembre 1962 (64 years)
- Ground: Ciudad Deportiva, Buñol, Valencia, Spain
- Capacity: 3,000
- President: Pablo Sánchez
- Head coach: Álvaro del Moral
- League: Tercera Federación – Group 6
- 2025–26: Tercera Federación – Group 6, 3rd of 18
Home colours	Away colours

Atlético Levante Unión Deportiva is a Spanish football team based in Valencia, in the namesake community. Founded in 1962, it is the reserve team of Levante UD, and plays in the Tercera Federación – Group 6.

== History ==
The club was founded on 10 November 1962 after a merger between Club Deportivo Portuarios (founded in 1952) and Unión Deportiva Malvarrosa (founded in 1926), with the latter already having partnerships with Levante UD. The new side was named Club Atlético Levante until 1976, when it changed to Levante UD Aficionados.

In 1994, after the first team became a Sociedad Anónima Deportiva, the reserve side was renamed Levante UD B. In 2014, the club returned to the name of Atlético Levante in an attempt to return to the name of the club in their foundation.

=== Club names ===
- Club Atlético Levante - (1962–76)
- Levante UD Aficionados - (1976-94)
- Levante UD B - (1994–2014)
- Atlético Levante UD - (2014– )

== Season to season ==
=== As Unión Deportiva Malvarrosa ===
Season	Tier	Division	Place	Copa del Rey
1941–42	4	2ª Reg.		
1942–43	4	2ª Reg.	1st	
1943–44	5	2ª Reg.	1st	
1944–45	4	1ª Reg.	6th	
1945–46	3	3ª	9th	
1946–47	3	3ª	6th	
1947–48	4	1ª Reg.	7th	
1948–49	4	1ª Reg.	12th	
1949–50	4	1ª Reg.	6th	
1950–51	4	1ª Reg.	7th	
1951–52	4	1ª Reg.	14th	

Season	Tier	Division	Place	Copa del Rey
1952–53	4	1ª Reg.	16th	
1953–54	5	2ª Reg.	9th	
1954–55	5	2ª Reg.	10th	
1955–56	5	2ª Reg.	10th	
1956–57	5	2ª Reg.	3rd	
1957–58	5	2ª Reg.	2nd	
1958–59	4	1ª Reg.	14th	
1959–60	4	1ª Reg.	16th	
1960–61	4	1ª Reg.	18th	
1961–62	5	2ª Reg.	10th	

- 2 seasons in Tercera División

=== As Club Deportivo Portuarios ===
Season	Tier	Division	Place	Copa del Rey
1952–53	6	3ª Reg.		
1953–54	5	2ª Reg.	8th	
1954–55	5	2ª Reg.	8th	
1955–56	5	2ª Reg.	3rd	
1956–57	4	1ª Reg.	1st	
1957–58	3	3ª	7th	
1958–59	3	3ª	14th	
1959–60	3	3ª	15th	
1960–61	3	3ª	11th	
1961–62	3	3ª	16th	

- 5 seasons in Tercera División

=== As Atlético Levante / Levante B ===
- As a farm team

Season	Tier	Division	Place	Copa del Rey
1962–63	4	1ª Reg.	14th	
1963–64	4	1ª Reg.	2nd	
1964–65	3	3ª	12th	
1965–66	3	3ª	8th	
1966–67	3	3ª	12th	
1967–68	3	3ª	7th	
1968–69	3	3ª	15th	
1969–70	4	1ª Reg.	17th	
1970–71	5	1ª Reg.	4th	
1971–72	5	1ª Reg.	2nd	
1972–73	4	Reg. Pref.	15th	
1973–74	4	Reg. Pref.	12th	
1974–75	4	Reg. Pref.	16th	
1975–76	4	Reg. Pref.	16th	
1976–77	4	Reg. Pref.	18th	
1977–78	5	Reg. Pref.	17th	

Season	Tier	Division	Place	Copa del Rey
1978–79	6	1ª Reg.	9th	
1979–80	6	1ª Reg.	15th	
1980–81	6	1ª Reg.	6th	
1981–82	6	1ª Reg.	14th	
1982–83	6	1ª Reg.	16th	
1983–84	6	1ª Reg.	10th	
1984–85	6	1ª Reg.	2nd	
1985–86	5	Reg. Pref.	13th	
1986–87	5	Reg. Pref.	16th	
1987–88	5	Reg. Pref.	4th	
1988–89	5	Reg. Pref.	17th	
1989–90	5	Reg. Pref.	16th	
1990–91	DNP			DNP
1991–92	DNP			DNP
1992–93	6	1ª Reg.	6th	DNP
1993–94	6	1ª Reg.	6th	DNP

- As a reserve team

Season	Tier	Division	Place
1994–95	6	1ª Reg.	2nd
1995–96	5	Reg. Pref.	6th
1996–97	5	Reg. Pref.	15th
1997–98	5	Reg. Pref.	3rd
1998–99	5	Reg. Pref.	1st
1999–2000	4	3ª	6th
2000–01	4	3ª	5th
2001–02	4	3ª	3rd
2002–03	4	3ª	4th
2003–04	4	3ª	4th
2004–05	3	2ª B	3rd
2005–06	3	2ª B	2nd
2006–07	3	2ª B	10th
2007–08	3	2ª B	20th
2008–09	4	3ª	12th
2009–10	4	3ª	9th
2010–11	4	3ª	17th
2011–12	4	3ª	2nd
2012–13	3	2ª B	3rd
2013–14	3	2ª B	18th

Season	Tier	Division	Place
2014–15	4	3ª	2nd
2015–16	3	2ª B	14th
2016–17	3	2ª B	16th
2017–18	4	3ª	1st
2018–19	3	2ª B	11th
2019–20	3	2ª B	12th
2020–21	3	2ª B	6th / 7th
2021–22	4	2ª RFEF	14th
2022–23	5	3ª Fed.	4th
2023–24	5	3ª Fed.	6th
2024–25	5	3ª Fed.	12th
2025–26	5	3ª Fed.	3rd
2026–27	5	3ª Fed.	

- 11 seasons in Segunda División B
- 1 season in Segunda División RFEF
- 16 seasons in Tercera División
- 5 seasons in Tercera Federación

== Honours ==
- Tercera División: 2017–18

== Players ==
=== Current squad ===
As of 14 November 2026.

Note: Flags indicate national team as defined under FIFA eligibility rules; some limited exceptions apply. Players may hold more than one non-FIFA nationality.

No.	Pos.	Nation	Player
1	GK	BRA	João Lecce
2	DF	ESP	Alejandro Moya
3	DF	ESP	Aitor Manzanedo
4	DF	ESP	Asier de Castro
5	DF	ESP	Borja Cortina
6	MF	ESP	Alberto Calatrava
7	FW	ESP	Ethan Sabater
8	MF	ESP	Pablo Rosón
9	FW	ESP	Hugo Goñi
10	MF	ESP	Dani Cervera
11	FW	ESP	Luismi Pérez
13	GK	ESP	Asier Herrera

No.	Pos.	Nation	Player
14	DF	GHA	Huseini Nakoha
15	MF	CMR	Max Phanuel Kemogne
16	MF	ESP	Álvaro García
17	FW	ESP	Javier Alonso
18	DF	ESP	Alejandro Herranz
19	DF	ESP	Salva Brull
21	MF	ESP	Manel Usedo
22	FW	ARG	Jorge de Asís (on loan from Gimnasia La Plata)
24	MF	ESP	David Robles
26	MF	BEL	Aaron Murenzi
27	FW	KAZ	Aldiyar Nurgali
30	FW	ROU	Andrei Roateș

=== Youth players ===
Note: Flags indicate national team as defined under FIFA eligibility rules; some limited exceptions apply. Players may hold more than one non-FIFA nationality.

No.	Pos.	Nation	Player
29	DF	ESP	Marc Santos
31	GK	ESP	Jordi Martínez
32	GK	UKR	Igor Galdin

No.	Pos.	Nation	Player
33	DF	ESP	Joan Gimeno
34	DF	ESP	Sergio Belda

== Club officials ==
=== Current technical staff ===
Position	Staff
Head coach	(Spain) Euge Ribera
Assistant coach	(Spain) Carlos García
Technical assistant & Analyst	(Spain) Pablo Pérez
Fitness coach	(Spain) Jordi García
Goalkeeping coach	(Spain) Ángel Ovejero
Doctor	(Spain) Pedro Albaladejo (Spain) Irene Montoro
Physiotherapist	(Spain) Javier Martínez (Spain) Rafa Torres
Delegate and Technical assistant	(Spain) Kaiku
Equipment Manager	(Spain) Marcos Santaisabel

Last updated: 12 September 2023
Source: Levante UD

== Notable players ==
- (Spain) Claudio Barragán
- (Spain) Aarón Bueno
- (Spain) Dani Cárdenas
- (Spain) José Enrique
- (Spain) Rubén García
- (Spain) Manu Herrera
- (Spain) Vicente Iborra
- (Spain) Jason
- (Spain) Juanra
- (Spain) Iván López
- (Spain) Víctor Marco
- (Spain) Roger Martí
- (Spain) Marc Mateu
- (Spain) Roque Mesa
- (Spain) Mono
- (Spain) José Morales
- (Spain) Mossa
- (Spain) Paco
- (Spain) Héctor Rodas
- (Spain) Andy Rodríguez
- (Spain) Emilio Sánchez

== Notable coaches ==
- (Spain) José Ángel Moreno
- (Spain) José Luis Oltra
