= Alberto Domínguez (footballer) =

Spanish footballer (born 1988)

Alberto
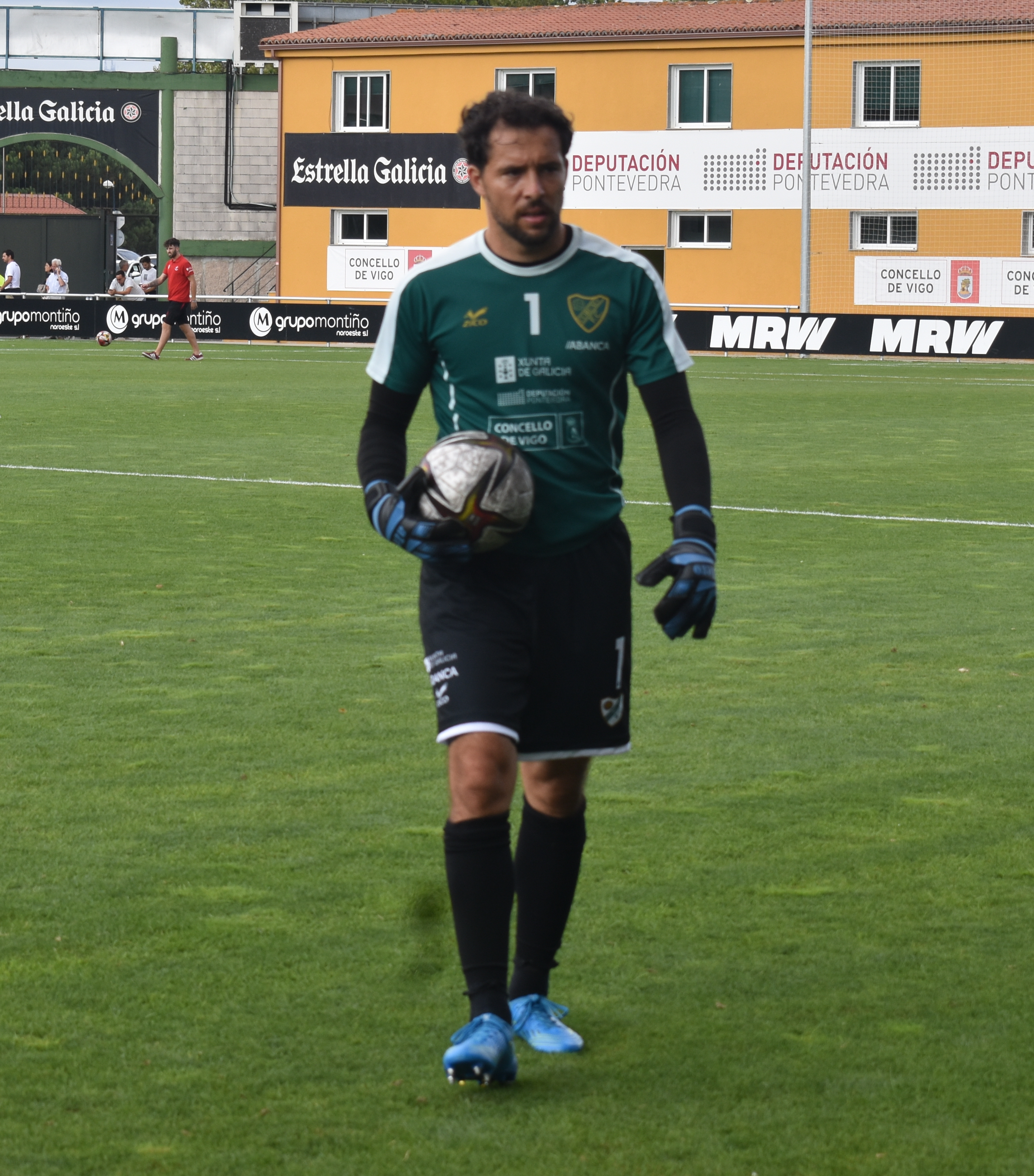

Personal information
- Full name: Alberto Manuel Domínguez Rivas
- Date of birth: 11 February 1988 (age 38)
- Place of birth: Compostela, Spain
- Height: 1.81 m (5 ft 11 1/2 in)
- Position: Goalkeeper

Team information
- Current team: Coruxo
- Number: 1

Youth career
- Espanyol
- Deportivo La Coruña

Senior career*
Years	Team	Apps	(Gls)
2007–2009	Deportivo B	3	(0)
2007–2008	→ Montañeros (loan)	13	(0)
2009–2010	Compostela	8	(0)
2010–2012	Coruxo	60	(0)
2012–2013	Getafe B	30	(0)
2013–2015	Albacete	24	(0)
2015–2016	Ponferradina	0	(0)
2016–	Coruxo	267	(0)
- * Club domestic league appearances and goals as of 14 May 2026

Alberto Manuel Domínguez Rivas (born 11 February 1988), known simply as Alberto, is a Spanish footballer who plays as a goalkeeper for Coruxo FC.

== Club career ==
Born in Santiago de Compostela, Galicia, Alberto graduated from Deportivo de La Coruña's youth setup, and made his senior debut while on loan at local club Montañeros CF. He returned to the Estadio Riazor in summer 2008, being immediately assigned to the reserves in the Segunda División B.

In June 2009, Alberto signed for SD Compostela in the same league, but after appearing sparingly he agreed to a deal at Coruxo FC of the same division in August 2010. On 3 July 2012 he joined another reserve team, Getafe CF B, occasionally being called up to the main squad.

On 18 July 2013, Alberto moved to Albacete Balompié also of the third division. Initially a backup to Francisco Dorronsoro, he became first-choice in mid-February 2014 and appeared in 18 games during the season (play-offs included), as the club returned to Segunda División after a three-year absence.

Alberto played his first match as a professional on 24 August 2014, starting in a 2–3 home loss against AD Alcorcón. He lost his importance in the squad due to the arrival of Diego Rivas as well as injury problems, and was released at the end of the campaign.

On 3 August 2015, Alberto signed with third-tier SD Ponferradina.

== Career statistics ==
As of match played 14 February 2021

Appearances and goals by club, season and competition
Club	Season	League			National Cup		Total	
Club	Season	Division	Apps	Goals	Apps	Goals	Apps	Goals
Deportivo B	2008–09	Segunda División B	3	0	—		3	0
Compostela	2009–10	Segunda División B	8	0	1	0	9	0
Coruxo	2010–11	Segunda División B	23	0	—		23	0
Coruxo	2011–12	Segunda División B	37	0	—		37	0
Getafe B	2012–13	Segunda División B	30	0	—		30	0
Albacete	2013–14	Segunda División B	14	0	1	0	15	0
Albacete	2014–15	Segunda División	10	0	2	0	12	0
Albacete	Total		24	0	3	0	27	0
Ponferradina	2015–16	Segunda División	0	0	2	0	2	0
Coruxo	2016–17	Segunda División B	31	0	—		31	0
Coruxo	2017–18	Segunda División B	37	0	—		37	0
Coruxo	2018–19	Segunda División B	38	0	—		38	0
Coruxo	2019–20	Segunda División B	28	0	0	0	28	0
Coruxo	2020–21	Segunda División B	9	0	0	0	9	0
Coruxo	Total		203	0	0	0	203	0
Career total			268	0	6	0	274	0
