= Marc Santos =

Spanish footballer (born 2010)

Personal information
- Full name: Marc Santos Gavilán
- Date of birth: 9 November 2010 (age 16)
- Place of birth: Massanassa, Spain
- Positions: Left-back; winger

Team information
- Current team: Levante
- Number: 33

Youth career
- 2018–: Levante

Senior career*
Years	Team	Apps	(Gls)
2026–	Levante	3	(0)
2026–	Levante B	2	(0)

International career^{‡}
2025–2026	Spain U16	5	(0)
2026–	Spain U17	2	(0)
- * Club domestic league appearances and goals as of 22:15, 15 November 2026 (UTC) ‡ National team caps and goals as of 22:15, 15 November 2026 (UTC)

Marc Santos Gavilán (born 9 November 2010) is a Spanish professional footballer who plays as either a left-back or a left winger for La Liga club Levante.

== Club career ==
Born in Massanassa, Valencian Community, Santos joined Levante UD's youth sides in 2017, aged eight. On 27 January 2026, he renewed his contract with the club, and spent the entire 2026 pre-season with the first team.

On 16 August 2026, before even having appeared with the reserves, Santos made his professional – and La Liga – debut, coming on as a second-half substitute for Iván Romero in a 3–0 away loss to RCD Espanyol; aged 15 years and 288 days, he became the club's youngest ever debutant.

== International career ==
On 28 October 2025, Santos was called up to the Spain national under-16 team for the Albir Garden Tournament.
