= Coruxo FC =

Spanish football club

Coordinates: 42.196083°N 8.791757°W

Coruxo
- Full name: Coruxo Fútbol Club
- Founded: 1930; 96 years ago as Coruxo Foot-ball Club
- Stadium: O Vao
- Capacity: 1,500
- President: Gustavo Falqué
- Head coach: Javier Maté Berzal
- League: Segunda Federación – Group 1
- 2025–26: Segunda Federación – Group 1, 5th of 18
- Website: http://www.coruxofc.com/
Home colours	Away colours

Coruxo Fútbol Club is a Spanish football club based in the parish of Coruxo, Vigo, in the autonomous community of Galicia. Founded in 1930 it plays in Segunda Federación – Group 1, holding home matches at O Vao, with a capacity of 1,500 spectators.

The association also has its own futsal section, amongst others. In December 2010 Óscar Pereiro, a former Tour de France winner, joined the club after retiring from cycling and appeared for its reserves.

== History ==
Founded in 1930, the club spent most of its history between the regional leagues and the Tercera División. In 2006–07, they finished second in that league and qualified for the play-offs, where they lost 4–2 on aggregate to CD Toledo. This qualified them for their first Copa del Rey campaign, which ended in the first round with a loss by the same score at home to CF Badalona on 29 August 2007.

Coruxo earned its first promotion to Segunda División B on 19 June 2010, with a 3–1 aggregate win over La Roda CF in the play-offs.

=== Club background ===
- Corujo Foot-ball Club (1930–1946)
- Corujo Sociedad Deportiva (1946–1954)
- Corujo Club de Fútbol (1954–1990)
- Corujo Fútbol Club (1990–1996)
- Coruxo Fútbol Club (1996–)

== Season to season ==
Season	Tier	Division	Place	Copa del Rey
1930–1936	—	Regional	—	
1936–1946	DNP			
1946–1954	—	Regional	—	
1954–55	5	2ª Reg.		
1955–56	5	2ª Reg.		
1956–57	5	2ª Reg.		
1957–58	4	Serie A	3rd	
1958–59	4	Serie A	2nd	
1959–60	3	3ª	10th	
1960–61	3	3ª	13th	
1961–62	3	3ª	11th	
1962–63	3	3ª	13th	
1963–64	3	3ª	14th	
1964–65	3	3ª	9th	
1965–66	3	3ª	13th	
1966–67	3	3ª	15th	
1967–68	4	Serie A	7th	
1968–69	6	2ª Reg.	1st	
1969–70	5	1ª Reg.	6th	
1970–71	5	1ª Reg.	2nd	

Season	Tier	Division	Place	Copa del Rey
1971–72	5	1ª Reg.	5th	
1972–73	5	1ª Reg.	5th	
1973–74	5	1ª Reg.	4th	
1974–75	5	1ª Reg.	3rd	
1975–76	5	1ª Reg.	7th	
1976–77	5	1ª Reg.	2nd	
1977–78	6	1ª Reg.	14th	
1978–79	7	2ª Reg.	2nd	
1979–80	7	2ª Reg.	2nd	
1980–81	6	1ª Reg.	6th	
1981–82	5	Reg. Pref.	6th	
1982–83	5	Reg. Pref.	8th	
1983–84	5	Reg. Pref.	1st	
1984–85	4	3ª	14th	
1985–86	4	3ª	9th	
1986–87	4	3ª	20th	
1987–88	4	3ª	9th	
1988–89	4	3ª	16th	
1989–90	4	3ª	18th	
1990–91	5	Reg. Pref.	2nd	

Season	Tier	Division	Place	Copa del Rey
1991–92	4	3ª	19th	
1992–93	5	Reg. Pref.	7th	
1993–94	5	Reg. Pref.	3rd	
1994–95	5	Reg. Pref.	3rd	
1995–96	4	3ª	20th	
1996–97	5	Reg. Pref.	5th	
1997–98	5	Reg. Pref.	7th	
1998–99	5	Reg. Pref.	4th	
1999–2000	5	Reg. Pref.	10th	
2000–01	5	Reg. Pref.	9th	
2001–02	5	Reg. Pref.	12th	
2002–03	5	Reg. Pref.	2nd	
2003–04	4	3ª	9th	
2004–05	4	3ª	4th	
2005–06	4	3ª	5th	
2006–07	4	3ª	2nd	
2007–08	4	3ª	4th	First round
2008–09	4	3ª	7th	
2009–10	4	3ª	4th	
2010–11	3	2ª B	14th	

Season	Tier	Division	Place	Copa del Rey
2011–12	3	2ª B	11th	
2012–13	3	2ª B	9th	
2013–14	3	2ª B	15th	
2014–15	3	2ª B	8th	
2015–16	3	2ª B	14th	
2016–17	3	2ª B	8th	
2017–18	3	2ª B	16th	
2018–19	3	2ª B	10th	
2019–20	3	2ª B	5th	First round
2020–21	3	2ª B	8th / 1st	First round
2021–22	4	2ª RFEF	4th	
2022–23	4	2ª Fed.	11th	First round
2023–24	4	2ª Fed.	10th	
2024–25	4	2ª Fed.	11th	
2025–26	4	2ª Fed.	5th	
2026–27	4	2ª Fed.		TBD

- 11 seasons in Segunda División B
- 6 seasons in Segunda Federación/Segunda División RFEF
- 23 seasons in Tercera División

== Current squad ==
As of 2 February 2024

Note: Flags indicate national team as defined under FIFA eligibility rules; some limited exceptions apply. Players may hold more than one non-FIFA nationality.

No.	Pos.	Nation	Player
1	GK	ESP	Alberto Domínguez
2	DF	ESP	Roque González
3	DF	ESP	Álvaro Fernández
4	DF	ESP	Borja Marchante
5	MF	ESP	Sergio Bernárdez
6	MF	ROU	Rareș Mezdrea
7	FW	ESP	Mateo Gandarillas
8	MF	ESP	Hugo Rodríguez
9	FW	ESP	Xabier Sola
10	FW	ESP	David Añón
12	FW	ESP	Santos Fonterigo
13	GK	ARG	Esteban Ruíz

No.	Pos.	Nation	Player
14	DF	ESP	Nacho Fariña
15	DF	ESP	Juan Rodríguez
16	DF	ESP	Miguel Raimúndez
18	DF	ESP	Álvaro Naveira
19	FW	ESP	Dani Rosas
20	DF	ESP	Carlos Alonso
21	MF	ESP	Guille Pinín
22	DF	ESP	Xavier Cidre
23	FW	ESP	Pelayo García
24	FW	ESP	Hugo Losada
—	DF	ESP	Breogán Sio
—	MF	ESP	Álex Barba

== Famous players ==
- (Brazil) Addison Alves
- (Spain) Javier Falagán
- (Spain) Óscar Pereiro
