= Víctor Bocanegra =

Mexican footballer (born 2002)

Personal information
- Full name: Víctor Gael Bocanegra Villanueva
- Date of birth: 2 July 2002 (age 24)
- Place of birth: Ciudad Victoria, Mexico
- Height: 1.57 m (5 ft 2 in)
- Position: Midfielder

Team information
- Current team: Gavilanes de Matamoros
- Number: 5

Youth career
- 2018–2020: Correcaminos UAT

Senior career*
Years	Team	Apps	(Gls)
2020–2021	UAT	4	(0)
2021	Zacatecas	0	(0)
2022–2023	Fresnillo	32	(2)
2023	UAT Premier	4	(0)
2024	Orgullo Reynosa	15	(0)
2024–	Gavilanes de Matamoros	1	(0)
- * Club domestic league appearances and goals as of 8 September 2024

Víctor Gael Bocanegra Villanueva (born 2 July 2002) is a Mexican footballer who currently plays as a midfielder for Gavilanes de Matamoros.

== Career statistics ==
=== Club ===
As of 14 January 2021.

Club	Season	League			Cup		Continental		Other		Total	
Club	Season	Division	Apps	Goals	Apps	Goals	Apps	Goals	Apps	Goals	Apps	Goals
UAT	2020–21	Liga de Expansión MX	4	0	–		–		–		4	0
Career total			4	0	0	0	0	0	0	0	4	0
