= Levante UD =

Association football club from Valencia, Spain

Levante
- Full name: Levante Unión Deportiva, S.A.D.
- Nicknames: Granotes (The Frogs); Los Azulgranas (The Blue and Reds)
- Founded: 6 September 1909; 117 years ago
- Stadium: Estadi Ciutat de València
- Capacity: 26,354
- President: Pablo Sánchez
- Head coach: Luís Castro
- League: La Liga
- 2025–26: La Liga, 16th of 20
- Website: levanteud.com
Home colours	Away colours

Levante Unión Deportiva, S.A.D. (Spanish: [leˈβante wˈnjon depoɾˈtiβa]) is a Spanish professional association football club in Valencia, in the Valencian Community. The club competes in La Liga, the top flight of Spanish professional football.

Founded on 6 September 1909, the club competes in La Liga for the 2026-27 season, holding home games at Ciutat de València Stadium.

== History ==
=== Early years (1909–1935) ===
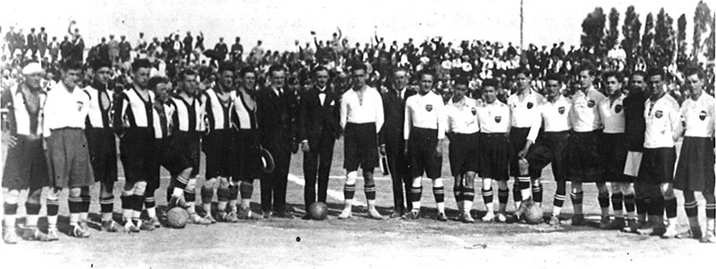
Levante CF vs Valencia CF in 1932

Levante UD was formerly (formally?) registered as Levante Football Club on 9 September 1909 (celebrating its 100th anniversary on 9 September 2009). Thus Levante is the oldest football club in the city of Valencia, with rival team Valencia CF not being formed until 1919.

Levante shares its name with the eastern region of the Iberian Peninsula, with Spain's east coast, the coast over which the sun rises (levantar in Spanish), with the Levant wind that comes from the east, and with the Levante beach in La Malvarrosa where Levante Football Club played some of its earliest fixtures.

Levante's earliest games were played at La Platjeta, near the docks on a plot of land owned by a perfume entrepreneur. Its next ground was also near the port area, and the club gradually became associated with the working class. In 1919, the side played Valencia CF for the first time, losing 0–1; the game marked the inauguration of the recently built ground at Algirós. In 1928, Levante FC won its first trophy, the Valencian Championship.

1909 also saw the birth of Gimnástico Football Club, which originally played at Patronato de la Juventud Obrera, being then named Gimnástico-Patronato. In 1919, Gimnástico became the champion of the Campeonato de Valencia, beating CD Castellón in the two-leg finals; the next year, the club became Real Gimnástico Football Club, after being granted royal patronage by Alfonso XIII, and they reached the final of Campeonato Regional de Levante, but lost to Club Deportivo Aguileño. In 1931, with the founding of the Second Spanish Republic, the club dropped the Real from its name.

In 1934–35, both Levante and Gimnástico debuted in the second division, when the league was expanded from 10 teams to 24. In 1935, Levante won the Campeonato Levante-Sur, a competition that featured teams from Valencia, Murcia and Andalusia, and subsequently reached the semi-finals of the Spanish Cup, consecutively beating Valencia and Barcelona before losing to eventual runners-up Sabadell.

=== During the civil war: Copa de la España Libre (1937) ===
During the Spanish Civil War, Levante and Gimnástico played in the Mediterranean League, finishing fifth and sixth, respectively. Teams from this league also competed in the Copa de la España Libre ("Free Spain Cup"). It was originally intended that the top four teams from the league would enter the cup, but Barcelona opted to tour Mexico and the United States, and as a result, Levante took its place. The first round of the competition was a mini-league with the top two teams, Levante and Valencia, qualifying for the final. On 18 July 1937, Levante defeated its city rivals 1–0 at the Montjuïc.

=== Merging: Gimnástico and Levante (1939) ===
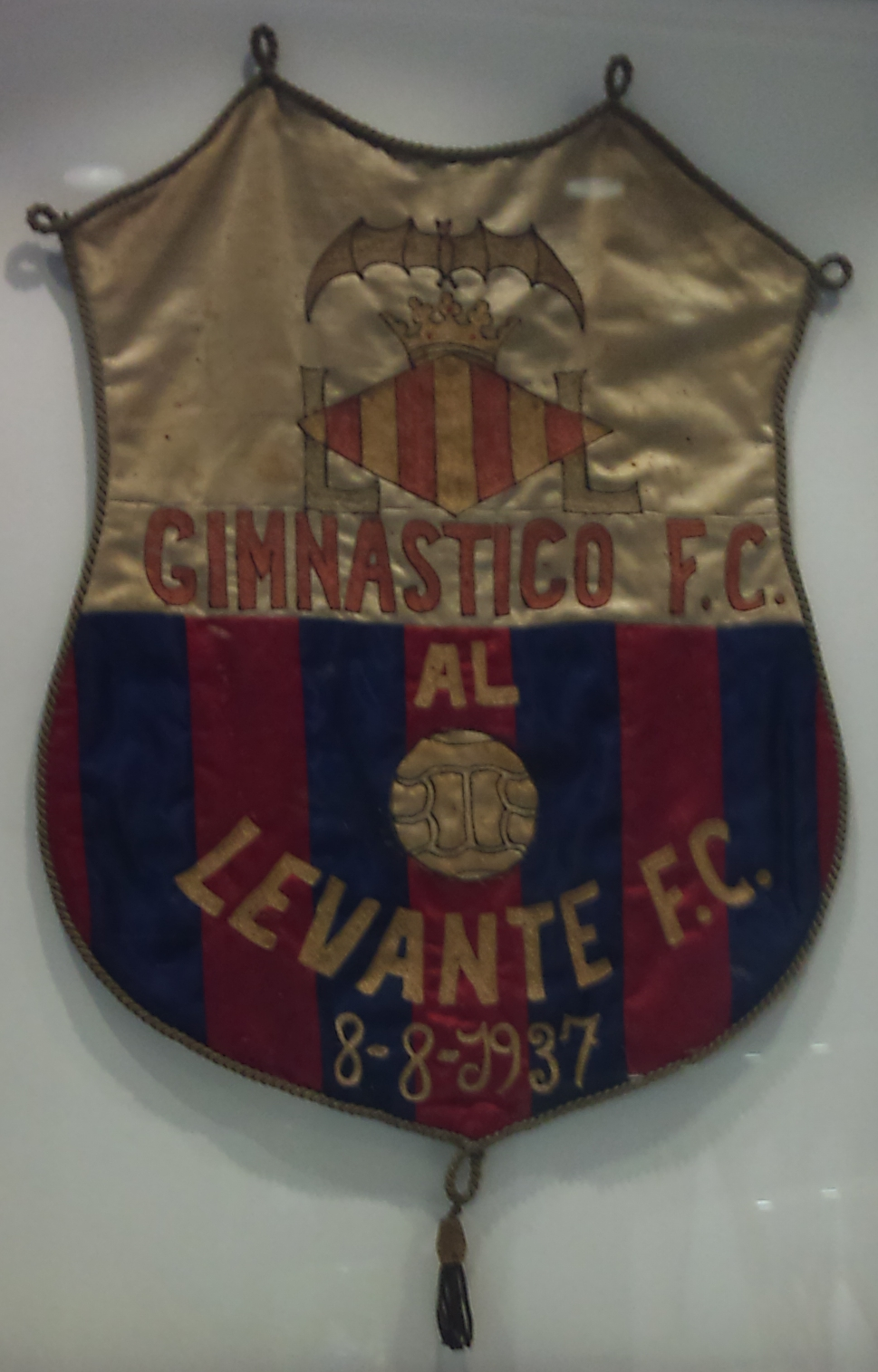
Pennat of Gimnàtic de València and Levante FC, the two teams that created the Levante UD

During the Civil War, Levante's ground was destroyed, but the club's squad remained intact. In contrast, Gimnástico had a ground, Estadio de Vallejo, but had lost most of their players. As a result, in 1939 Levante FC and Gimnástico FC merged into Levante Unión Deportiva. Levante UD can thus trace its origin back to at least 1909 through both Levante FC and Gimnástico FC. The merged club was at first named Unión Deportiva Levante-Gimnástico, then changed it a few years later to Levante Unión Deportiva. The current club colours date from this era: the blaugrana, blue-garnet, home colours were originally those of Gimnástico FC, while the black and white away kit were the colours of Levante FC. Levante UD also inherited from Gimnástico FC their nickname, Granota, the Frogs.

=== La Liga: relegations and promotions (1963–present) ===
Levante had to wait until the 1960s to make its La Liga debut. In 1963, the club finished runner-up in Group II of the second division, defeating Deportivo de La Coruña 4–2 on aggregate in the promotion play-offs. During the first top flight season, it managed to win both games against Valencia, and also achieved a 5–1 home win against Barcelona in the 1964–65 campaign, but was relegated nonetheless after losing in the playoffs against Málaga. It spent most of the following two decades in the second and third divisions; the Segunda División B would not be created until 1977.

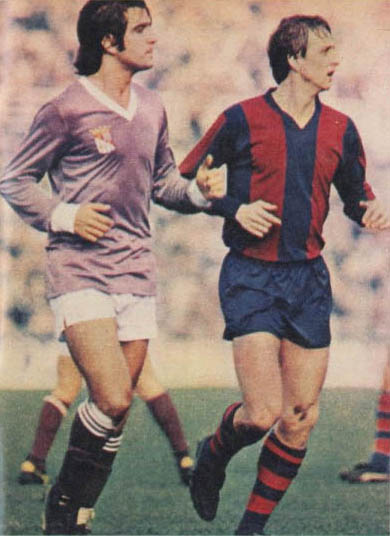
Johan Cruyff on his debut with Levante, March 1981

In the early 1980s, Dutch superstar Johan Cruyff played half a season for the club, retiring three years later. After winning 2003–04's second division, Levante returned to the top level but survived only one season. Finishing third in 2005–06, it returned for two additional campaigns, the decisive match in the 2006–07 season being a 4–2 home win against Valencia courtesy of Riga Mustapha (two goals), Salva and Laurent Courtois.

Levante's financial status worsened, however, and there were reports that the players had only received approximately one-fifth of their contractual payments. News reports stated that the club had incurred a debt of over €18 million in payments due to its players. The team plummeted down the standings, and it was confirmed with several matches to go that the club would be playing in the second division in 2008–09. The players protested at their lack of payments at one point, refusing to move for several seconds after the opening whistle against Deportivo and later announcing that they would strike during the season-ending game at Real Madrid. The threat was withdrawn when league officials announced that a benefit game would be played between a Levante XI and a Primera División XI, with all receipts going to pay the Levante players' wages.

On 13 June 2010, Levante returned to La Liga after a 3–1 home win against already relegated Castellón, making its final round 0–4 defeat at Real Betis irrelevant. Under the manager who led the team back to the top flight, Luis García Plaza, Levante finally retained its top division status in the 2010–11 season. At one point in the league's second round of matches, Levante was third in the table behind Barcelona and Real Madrid, after losing just once (against Real Madrid) in 12 games.

Chart of Levante UD league performance 1929–present

On 26 October 2011, during round nine of the season, Levante defeated Real Sociedad 3–2 to move top of the first division table for the first time in the club's history, with 23 points. In the process, it recorded seven straight wins after drawing its first two games. The club eventually finished sixth after defeating Athletic Bilbao 3–0 at home in its last match, thus qualifying for the UEFA Europa League for the first time in its history. There, they made it to the last 16 before a 2–0 extra-time loss to Russia's FC Rubin Kazan.

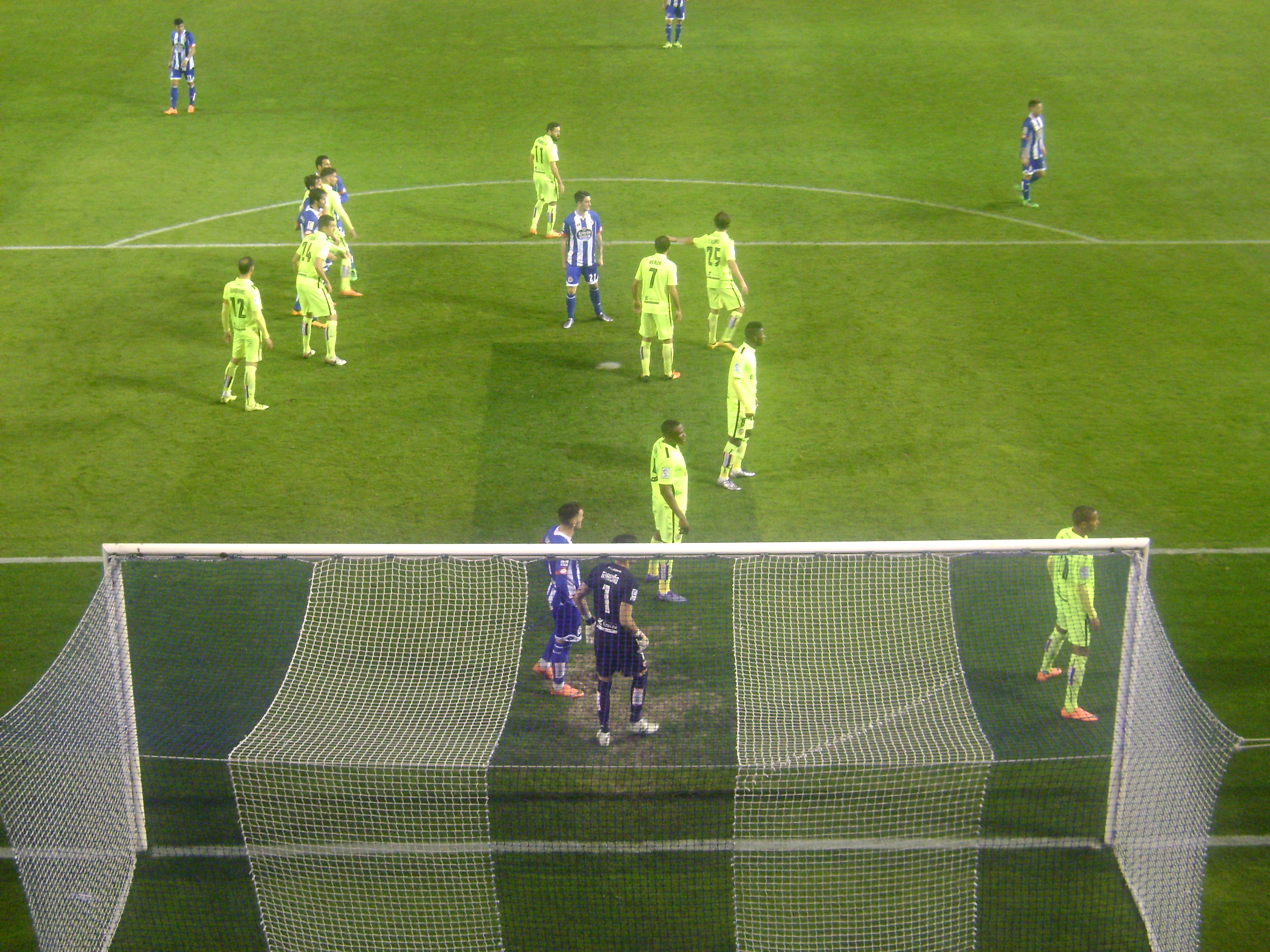
Deportivo de La Coruña vs. Levante.

In the 2015–16 season, Levante was relegated after defeat by Málaga and finished last. The club was promoted back to the top league in 2016–17, winning the Segunda División title. In the 2017–18 season, the club secured safety in the league and on 13 May, beat the champions Barcelona 5–4 (having led 5–1 early in the second half), with Emmanuel Boateng scoring his first ever career hat-trick. This win ended Barcelona's hopes of achieving an unbeaten season.

In the 2021–22 season, Levante was relegated after being defeated 0–6 by Real Madrid, ending their five years in the top tier.

== Seasons ==
=== Recent history ===
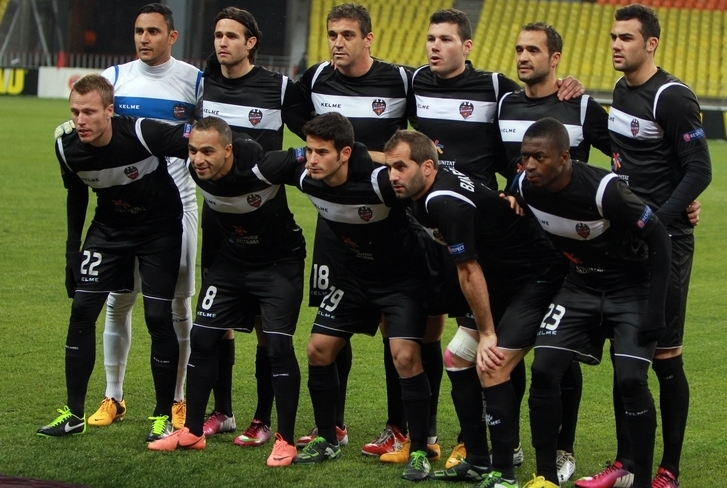
Before a game in March 2013

Season	Div	Pos.	Pld	W	D	L	GF	GA	Pts	Cup	Notes
2003–04	2D	1st	42	22	13	7	59	33	79	Last 16	Promoted
2004–05	1D	18th	38	9	10	19	39	58	37		Relegated
2005–06	2D	3rd	42	20	14	8	53	39	74	1st round	Promoted
2006–07	1D	15th	38	10	12	16	37	53	42	Last 16	
2007–08	1D	20th	38	7	5	26	33	75	26	Last 16	Relegated
2008–09	2D	8th	42	18	10	14	59	59	64		
2009–10	2D	3rd	42	19	14	9	63	45	71		Promoted
2010–11	1D	14th	38	12	9	17	41	52	45	Last 16	
2011–12	1D	6th	38	16	7	15	54	50	55	Quarter-finals	Qualified to UEFA Europa League
2012–13	1D	11th	38	12	10	16	40	57	46	Last 16	Last 16 UEFA Europa League
2013–14	1D	10th	38	12	12	14	35	43	48	Quarter-finals	
2014–15	1D	14th	38	9	10	19	34	67	37	Last 16	
2015–16	1D	20th	36	7	8	21	34	66	29	1st round	Relegated
2016–17	2D	1st	42	25	9	8	57	32	84	2nd round	Champions and Promoted
2017–18	1D	15th	38	11	13	14	44	58	46	Last 16	
2018–19	1D	15th	38	11	11	16	59	66	44	Last 16	
2019–20	1D	12th	38	14	7	17	47	53	49	Last 32	
2020–21	1D	14th	38	9	14	15	46	57	41	Semi-finals	
2021–22	1D	19th	38	8	11	19	51	76	35	2nd round	Relegated
2022–23	2D	3rd	42	18	18	6	46	30	72	Last 16	Promotion Play-offs Runners-up
2023–24	2D	8th	42	13	20	9	49	45	59	2nd round	
2024–25	2D	1st	42	22	13	7	69	42	79	1st round	Champions and Promoted
2025–26	1D	16th	38	11	9	18	47	61	42	Last 32	

=== European record ===
Season	Competition	Round	Opposition	Home	Away	Aggregate
2012–13	UEFA Europa League	Play-off round	(Scotland) Motherwell	1–0	2–0	3–0
2012–13	UEFA Europa League	Group L	(Netherlands) Twente	3–0	0–0	2nd
2012–13	UEFA Europa League	Group L	(Germany) Hannover 96	2–2	1–2	2nd
2012–13	UEFA Europa League	Group L	(Sweden) Helsingborg	1–0	3–1	2nd
2012–13	UEFA Europa League	Round of 32	(Greece) Olympiacos	3–0	1–0	4–0
2012–13	UEFA Europa League	Round of 16	(Russia) Rubin Kazan	0–0	0–2 (a.e.t.)	0–2

=== Season to season ===
Season	Tier	Division	Place	Copa del Rey
1939–40	2	2ª	1st	First round
1940–41	2	2ª	3rd	Quarterfinals
1941–42	2	2ª	8th	First round
1942–43	3	1ª Reg.	1st	First round
1943–44	3	3ª	1st	-
1944–45	3	3ª	2nd	-
1945–46	3	3ª	1st	-
1946–47	2	2ª	6th	Round of 16
1947–48	2	2ª	5th	Fifth round
1948–49	2	2ª	9th	Fourth round
1949–50	2	2ª	13th	Third round
1950/51	2	2ª	13th	-
1951–52	2	2ª	14th	-
1952–53	3	3ª	2nd	-
1953–54	3	3ª	1st	-
1954–55	2	2ª	15th	-
1955–56	3	3ª	1st	-
1956–57	2	2ª	11th	-
1957–58	2	2ª	4th	-
1958–59	2	2ª	2nd	Round of 32

Season	Tier	Division	Place	Copa del Rey
1959–60	2	2ª	6th	First round
1960–61	2	2ª	6th	First round
1961–62	2	2ª	6th	First round
1962–63	2	2ª	2nd	Round of 16
1963–64	1	1ª	10th	Round of 32
1964–65	1	1ª	14th	Round of 16
1965–66	2	2ª	5th	First round
1966–67	2	2ª	4th	Round of 32
1967–68	2	2ª	14th	First round
1968–69	3	3ª	3rd	-
1969–70	3	3ª	4th	Third round
1970–71	3	3ª	12th	First round
1971–72	3	3ª	6th	Second round
1972–73	3	3ª	1st	Third round
1973–74	2	2ª	19th	Fifth round
1974–75	3	3ª	2nd	Fourth round
1975–76	3	3ª	1st	First round
1976–77	2	2ª	18th	Second round
1977–78	3	2ª B	4th	Third round
1978–79	3	2ª B	1st	Second round

Season	Tier	Division	Place	Copa del Rey
1979–80	2	2ª	10th	Third round
1980–81	2	2ª	9th	Round of 16
1981–82	2	2ª	19th	Third round
1982–83	4	3ª	2nd	Second round
1983–84	4	3ª	2nd	Second round
1984–85	3	2ª B	11th	Second round
1985–86	3	2ª B	10th	-
1986–87	4	3ª	2nd	-
1987–88	3	2ª B	6th	Third round
1988–89	3	2ª B	1st	Second round
1989–90	2	2ª	15th	First round
1990–91	2	2ª	19th	Third round
1991–92	3	2ª B	11th	Third round
1992–93	3	2ª B	9th	Second round
1993–94	3	2ª B	3rd	Third round
1994–95	3	2ª B	1st	First round
1995–96	3	2ª B	1st	Third round
1996–97	2	2ª	9th	Second round
1997–98	2	2ª	22nd	First round
1998–99	3	2ª B	1st	Round of 16

Season	Tier	Division	Place	Copa del Rey
1999–2000	2	2ª	7th	prem. round
2000–01	2	2ª	8th	Round of 32
2001–02	2	2ª	19th	Round of 32
2002–03	2	2ª	4th	Round of 64
2003–04	2	2ª	1st	Round of 16
2004–05	1	1ª	18th	Round of 32
2005–06	2	2ª	3rd	First round
2006–07	1	1ª	15th	Round of 32
2007–08	1	1ª	20th	Round of 16
2008–09	2	2ª	8th	Second round
2009–10	2	2ª	3rd	Second round
2010–11	1	1ª	14th	Round of 16
2011–12	1	1ª	6th	Quarterfinals
2012–13	1	1ª	11th	Round of 16
2013–14	1	1ª	10th	Quarterfinals
2014–15	1	1ª	14th	Round of 16
2015–16	1	1ª	20th	Round of 32
2016–17	2	2ª	1st	Second round
2017–18	1	1ª	15th	Round of 16
2018–19	1	1ª	15th	Round of 16

Season	Tier	Division	Place	Copa del Rey
2019–20	1	1ª	12th	Round of 32
2020–21	1	1ª	14th	Semifinals
2021–22	1	1ª	19th	Second round
2022–23	2	2ª	3rd	Round of 16
2023–24	2	2ª	8th	Second round
2024–25	2	2ª	1st	First round
2025–26	1	1ª	16th	Round of 32
2026–27	1	1ª		TBD

- 18 seasons in La Liga
- 41 seasons in Segunda División
- 12 seasons in Segunda División B
- 16 seasons in Tercera División
- 1 season in Categorías Regionales

== Players ==
=== Current squad ===
As of 7 September 2026

Note: Flags indicate national team as defined under FIFA eligibility rules; some limited exceptions apply. Players may hold more than one non-FIFA nationality.

No.	Pos.	Nation	Player
1	GK	ESP	Pablo Campos
2	DF	ALG	Aïssa Mandi (4th captain)
3	DF	AUT	Ifeanyi Ndukwe (on loan from Liverpool)
4	DF	ESP	Adrián Dela (vice-captain)
5	MF	ESP	Hugo Sotelo (on loan from Celta)
6	MF	ESP	Dani Requena (on loan from Villarreal)
7	FW	ESP	Roger Brugué (captain)
8	MF	ESP	Jon Ander Olasagasti
9	FW	ESP	Iván Romero (3rd captain)
10	FW	SRB	Petar Ratkov (on loan from Lazio)
11	FW	BEL	Yanis Musuayi
13	GK	AUS	Mathew Ryan
14	DF	ESP	Jorge Cabello

No.	Pos.	Nation	Player
16	MF	FRA	Axel Tape (on loan from Bayer Leverkusen)
17	DF	ESP	Víctor García
18	MF	FRA	Enzo Bardeli
20	MF	ESP	Oriol Rey
21	FW	CMR	Karl Etta Eyong
22	DF	GER	Jeremy Toljan
23	DF	ESP	Manu Sánchez (on loan from Celta)
24	MF	ARG	Thiago Fernández (on loan from Villarreal)
27	MF	ESP	Paco Cortés
29	DF	ESP	Nacho Pérez
32	GK	ESP	Álex Primo
33	DF	ESP	Marc Santos

=== Reserve team ===
Note: Flags indicate national team as defined under FIFA eligibility rules; some limited exceptions apply. Players may hold more than one non-FIFA nationality.

No.	Pos.	Nation	Player
26	FW	ESP	Luismi Pérez
34	MF	ESP	Manel Usedo
35	DF	GHA	Huseini Nakoha

No.	Pos.	Nation	Player
36	GK	UKR	Igor Galdin
38	MF	ESP	Alberto Calatrava
39	DF	ESP	Alejandro Moya

=== Out on loan ===
Note: Flags indicate national team as defined under FIFA eligibility rules; some limited exceptions apply. Players may hold more than one non-FIFA nationality.

No.	Pos.	Nation	Player
—	GK	ESP	Dani Martín (at Valladolid until 30 June 2027)
—	DF	PAN	Martín Krug (at Juventud Torremolinos until 30 June 2027)

No.	Pos.	Nation	Player
—	MF	ISR	Tay Abed (at Valladolid until 30 June 2027)

== Club officials ==
=== Current technical staff ===
Position	Staff
Head coach	(Portugal) Luís Castro
Assistant head coach	(Portugal) Rui Cunha (Portugal) Jorge Cordeiro (Portugal) José Costa (Spain) Vicente Iborra (Spain) Carlos García
Fitness coach	(Spain) Vicente Benítez (Spain) Roberto Ovejero
Goalkeeping coach	(Spain) Dani Ayora
Chief analyst	(Spain) Iñaki Aizpurúa
Chief of medical services	(Spain) Joel Gambín
Doctor	(Spain) Salvador Chang (Spain) Adolfo López
Rehab coach	(Spain) Luis Miguel González Cuesta
Head of physiotherapist	(Spain) Guillem Roger Gil
Physiotherapist	(Spain) Javi Martínez (Argentina) Martín Badano (Spain) Javier Torres (Spain) Alberto Espinola (Spain) David Caballero (Spain) Carlos Cabrelles
Nutritionist	(Spain) Ana García
Chiropodist	(Spain) Jairo Casal
Delegate	(Spain) José Gómez
Maintenance chief	(Spain) José Ramón Ferrer Bueno
Equipment manager	(Spain) Manuel Motos (Spain) Javier Ramos

Last updated: 20 December 2025
Source: Levante UD (in Spanish)

== Notable former players ==
Note: this list includes players that have appeared in at least 100 league games and/or have reached international status.

- (Algeria) Abdelkader Ghezzal
- (Algeria) Nabil Ghilas
- (Argentina) Pablo Cavallero
- (Argentina) Gustavo Reggi
- (Australia) Mitchell Langerak
- (Austria) Andreas Ivanschitz
- (Brazil) Sávio
- (Brazil) Wanderley
- (Brazil) Zé Maria
- (Bulgaria) Vladimir Manchev
- (Cameroon) Daniel N'Gom Kome
- (Cameroon) Lauren
- (Cameroon) Albert Meyong
- (Cape Verde) Valdo
- (Cape Verde) José Veiga
- (Chile) Carlos Caszely
- (Colombia) Edwin Congo
- (Colombia) Jefferson Lerma
- (Costa Rica) Keylor Navas
- (Croatia) Tomislav Erceg
- (Ecuador) Felipe Caicedo
- (Ecuador) Jefferson Montero
- (Equatorial Guinea) Sergio Barila
- (Equatorial Guinea) Juvenal
- (Equatorial Guinea) Yago
- (France) Frédéric Déhu
- (France) Olivier Kapo
- (France) Péguy Luyindula
- (France) Laurent Robert
- (Georgia (country)) Shota Arveladze
- (Ghana) Emmanuel Boateng
- (Ghana) Riga Mustapha
- (Greece) Theofanis Gekas
- (Greece) Nikolaos Karabelas
- (Greece) Loukas Vyntra
- (Republic of Ireland) Ian Harte
- (Italy) Damiano Tommasi
- (Italy) Giuseppe Rossi
- (Ivory Coast) Félix Dja Ettien
- (Ivory Coast) Arouna Koné
- (North Macedonia) Enis Bardhi
- (Mali) Mohamed Sissoko
- (Morocco) Issam El Adoua
- (Morocco) Nabil El Zhar
- (Morocco) Zouhair Feddal
- (Morocco) Moha
- (Mozambique) Simão Mate
- (Netherlands) Johan Cruyff
- (Netherlands) Faas Wilkes
- (Nigeria) Obafemi Martins
- (Poland) Dariusz Dudka
- (Portugal) Duda
- (South Africa) Fahad Al-Muwallad
- (Serbia) Vladan Kujović
- (Senegal) Baba Diawara
- (Senegal) Pape Diop
- (Senegal) Rémi Gomis
- (Senegal) Sylvain N'Diaye
- (Spain) Alexis
- (Spain) Salva Ballesta
- (Spain) Sergio Ballesteros
- (Spain) Claudio Barragán
- (Spain) Antonio Calpe
- (Spain) Diego Camacho
- (Spain) José Campaña
- (Spain) Víctor Casadesús
- (Spain) Ángel Cuéllar
- (Spain) Asier del Horno
- (Spain) Iñaki Descarga
- (Spain) Ernesto Domínguez
- (Spain) Javier Farinós
- (Spain) Rubén García
- (Spain) Sergio García
- (Spain) Fernando Giner
- (Spain) Sergio González
- (Spain) Jason
- (Spain) Jofre
- (Spain) Juanfran
- (Spain) Juanlu
- (Spain) Vicente Latorre
- (Spain) Pedro López
- (Spain) José Francisco Molina
- (Spain) Nando
- (Spain) David Navarro
- (Spain) Miguel Pallardó
- (Spain) Sergio Postigo
- (Spain) Alberto Rivera
- (Spain) Gaspar Rubio
- (Spain) Rubén Suárez
- (Spain) Vicente Rodríguez
- (Sweden) Johan Mjällby
- (Switzerland) Fabio Celestini
- (Turkey) Enes Ünal
- (United States) Shaquell Moore
- (Uruguay) Gustavo Munúa
- (Uruguay) Héctor Núñez
- (Uruguay) Tabaré Silva
- (Uruguay) Cristhian Stuani
- (Venezuela) Emilio Rentería
- (Socialist Federal Republic of Yugoslavia) Predrag Mijatović

== Coaches ==
- (Spain) Josep Escolà (1955–56)
- (Spain) Enrique Orizaola (1964–65)
- (Spain) Mundo (1971)
- (Spain) José Juncosa (1972–73)
- (Uruguay) Héctor Núñez (1973–74)
- (Czechoslovakia) Ferdinand Daučík (1974–75)
- (Uruguay) Dagoberto Moll (1975–76)
- (Spain) Pachín (1979–81)
- (Spain) Joaquim Rifé (1981)
- (Socialist Federal Republic of Yugoslavia) Todor Veselinović (1981)
- (Spain) Vicente Piquer (1981)
- (Spain) Pachín (1984–85)
- (Spain) Quique Hernández (1987)
- (Spain) Pachín (1987–88)
- (Hungary) Antal Dunai (1990)
- (Spain) José Antonio Irulegui (1990–91)
- (Spain) Luis Costa (1992)
- (Spain) José Enrique Díaz (1993–94)
- (Spain) Jordi Gonzalvo (1994)
- (Spain) Juande Ramos (1994–95)
- (Spain) Mané (1996–97)
- (Spain) José Enrique Díaz (1997)
- (Spain) Jesús Aranguren (1998)
- (Spain) Pepe Balaguer (1998–2000)
- (Spain) José Carlos Granero (2000–01)
- (Spain) Pepe Balaguer (2001–2002)
- (Spain) Carlos García Cantarero (2002–03)
- (Spain) Manuel Preciado (2003–04)
- (Germany) Bernd Schuster (2004–05)
- (Spain) José Luis Oltra (2005)
- (Spain) Mané (2005–06)
- (Spain) Juan Ramón López Caro (2006–07)
- (Spain) Abel Resino (2007)
- (Italy) Gianni De Biasi (2007–08)
- (Spain) José Ángel Moreno (2008)
- (Spain) Luis García (2008–11)
- (Spain) Juan Ignacio Martínez (2011–13)
- (Spain) Joaquín Caparrós (2013–14)
- (Spain) José Luis Mendilibar (2014)
- (Spain) Lucas Alcaraz (2014–15)
- (Spain) Rubi (2015–16)
- (Spain) Juan Muñiz (2016–18)
- (Spain) Paco López (2018–21)
- (Spain) Javier Pereira (2021)
- (Italy) Alessio Lisci (2021–22)
- (Tunisia) Mehdi Nafti (2022)
- (Spain) Javier Calleja (2022–2024)
- (Spain) Felipe Miñambres (2024)
- (Spain) Julián Calero (2024–2025)
- (Portugal) Luís Castro (2025-present)

== Honours ==
=== National competitions ===
- Copa del Rey
  - Winners (1): 1937
- Segunda División
  - Winners (3): 2003–04, 2016–17, 2024–25
- Segunda División B
  - Winners (5) - joint record: 1978–79, 1988–89, 1994–95, 1995–96, 1998–99
- Tercera División
  - Winners (7): 1931–32, 1943–44, 1945–46, 1953–54, 1955–56, 1972–73, 1975–76

=== Regional competitions ===
- Campeonato de Valencia
  - Winners: 1927–28
- Campeonato Levante-Sur
  - Winners: 1934–35

=== Friendly tournaments ===
- Trofeo Costa de Valencia
  - Winners: 1972, 1974, 1977
- Trofeo Comunidad Valenciana
  - Winners: 1986
- Trofeo Ciutat de València
  - Winners: 1995
- Trofeo Ciudad de Valencia
  - Winners: 1997
- Trofeo de la Generalitat Valenciana
  - Winners: 2000

== Stadium ==
Estadi Ciutat de València was opened on 9 September 1969, with capacity for 25,354 spectators. The pitch measures 107 by 69 metres.

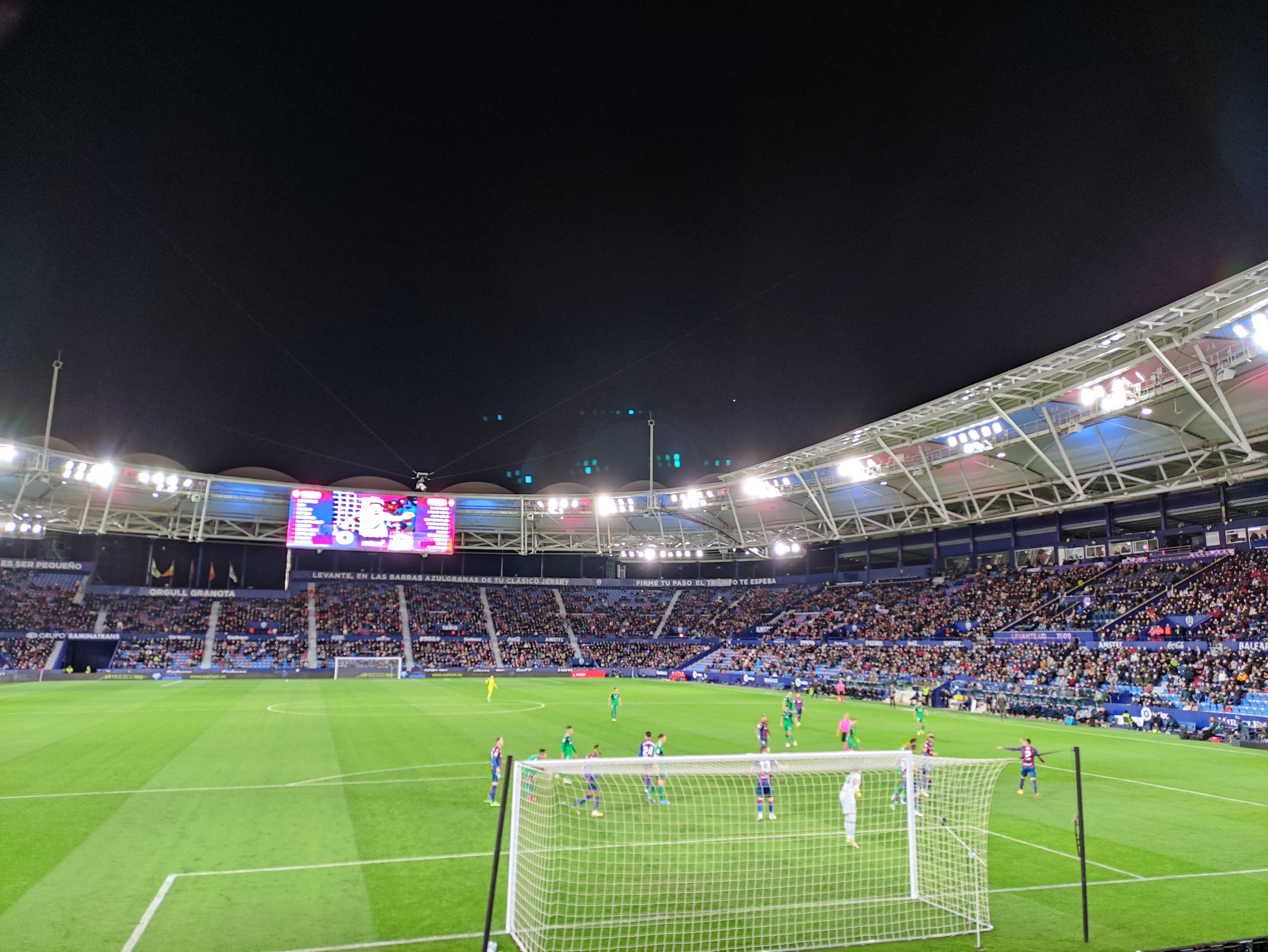
Levante UD home stadium Estadi Ciutat de València.

Due to the 2019–20 season's late finish because of the COVID-19 pandemic, and renovation work at their stadium, Levante concluded the campaign behind closed doors at the Estadi Olímpic Camilo Cano in La Nucia, Province of Alicante.

== Rivals ==
Levante contest the Derbi Valenciano, also known as the Derbi del Turia or Derbi Valentino, with local rivals Valencia. The fixture has been played 38 times competitively, with Valencia winning 21 times to Levante's 8.

== See also ==
- Atlético Levante UD, reserve team of Levante UD
- Levante UD Femenino, women's team
- Levante UD (beach soccer), beach soccer department
