= Luís Castro (football manager, born 1980) =

Portuguese football manager

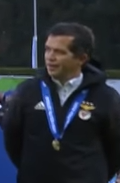
- Castro in 2022

Personal information
- Full name: Luís Manuel Ferreira de Castro
- Date of birth: 7 May 1980 (age 46)
- Place of birth: Moreira de Cónegos, Portugal

Team information
- Current team: Levante (head coach)

Managerial career
- Years: Team
- 2002–2005: Vizela (youth)
- 2005–2007: Moreirense (youth)
- 2009–2010: Vizela (youth)
- 2011–2012: Al Nassr (youth)
- 2012–2015: Vitória Guimarães (youth)
- 2018–2019: Vitória Guimarães U23
- 2019: Panetolikos
- 2019–2022: Benfica (youth)
- 2022–2023: Benfica B
- 2023–2025: Dunkerque
- 2025: Nantes
- 2025–: Levante

Luís Manuel Ferreira de Castro (born 7 May 1980) is a Portuguese football manager, who is the head coach of La Liga club Levante.

== Career ==
=== Early career ===
Castro was born in Moreira de Cónegos, Braga District, and began his managerial career with the under-10 squad at Vizela. In 2005, he was invited by Moreirense to be their youth coordinator and manager of the under-19 squad.

In 2009, after a year in charge of the under-14s of the Braga Football Association, Castro returned to Vizela. In 2011, he moved abroad and took over the under-15 team of Saudi club Al Nassr.

Castro returned to his home country in 2012, after being named manager of Vitória de Guimarães' under-15 squad. He then took over the under-19s and worked as a youth coordinator before moving to Hungary in July 2016, with Debreceni VSC.

In 2017, Castro returned to Vitória de Guimarães under the same role, and was also in charge of the under-23s in the 2018–19 season.

=== Panetolikos ===
On 30 May 2019, Castro was named manager of Super League Greece side Panetolikos. On 11 October, he was sacked by the club.

=== Benfica ===
Castro joined Benfica on 27 November 2019, after being named manager of the under-23s. On 2 June 2022, after leading the under-19s to the UEFA Youth League title, he took over the B-team, before winning the Under-20 Intercontinental Cup with under-20s. In 2022–23, he led Benfica B to a 15th place in Liga Portugal 2, close to relegation.

=== Dunkerque ===
On 26 September 2023, Castro was named new manager of Ligue 2 club Dunkerque. During the 2024–25 season, he led the side to a play-off position (being knocked out in the semifinals), and also reached the Coupe de France semifinals (being knocked out by eventual champions Paris Saint-Germain).

=== Nantes ===
On 11 June 2025, Castro was appointed manager of Ligue 1 club Nantes. He was fired in December.

=== Levante ===
On 20 December 2025, Castro was appointed as manager of La Liga club Levante.

== Managerial statistics ==
As of match played 12 November 2026

Managerial record by team and tenure
Team	From	To	Record				
Team	From	To	P	W	D	L	Win %
Panetolikos	1 July 2019	11 October 2019	6	0	1	5	0.00
Dunkerque	27 September 2023	30 June 2025	78	38	12	28	48.72
Nantes	1 July 2025	11 December 2025	15	2	5	8	13.33
Levante	20 December 2025	present	35	12	10	13	34.29
Career total			134	52	28	54	38.81

== Honours ==
Benfica

- Campeonato Nacional de Juniores: 2021–22
- UEFA Youth League: 2021–22
- Under-20 Intercontinental Cup: 2022
