= Lobos (disambiguation) =

Lobos is the partido capital of Lobos Partido in Buenos Aires Province, Argentina.

Lobos or LOBOS may also refer to:

== Places ==
- Lobos Creek, a stream in San Francisco, California
- Lobos Partido, a partido of Buenos Aires Province, Argentina
- Laguna de Lobos, a lake located near Lobos, Buenos Aires Province, Argentina
- Punta Lobos, a headland that was the launch site for sounding rockets in Peru
- Punta de Lobos, Chilean town
- Sierra de Lobos, a mountain range in Guanajuato state of central Mexico
- Isla de Lobos, an island southeast of Punta del Este, Maldonado department, Uruguay
- Lobos Island, an island at the confluence of Uruguay and Negro rivers, Rio Negro department, Uruguay
- Lobos Island, an island of the Canary Islands
- Two Lobos Islands in Peru's Guano Islands
- Cay Lobos, an island in the Bahamas
- Silvino Lobos, a municipality in the province of Northern Samar, Philippines

== People ==
- Lobos (surname)

== Sports ==
=== New Mexico ===
- New Mexico Lobos, the athletic teams representing the University of New Mexico

=== Texas ===
- Hill Country Lobos, an American soccer team based in Central Texas
- Sul Ross State Lobos, the athletic teams of Sul Ross State University, a public university in Alpine, Texas
- Laredo Lobos, a professional arena football team based out of Laredo, Texas

=== Mexico ===
- Lobos ULMX, a Mexican football club based in Celaya
- Lobos BUAP, a Mexican football club based in Puebla
  - Lobos Plateados de la BUAP, a Mexican professional basketball team based in Puebla
- Lobos Huerta F.C., a Mexican football club based in Chalco
- Lobos Zacatepec, a Mexican professional football team based in Zacatepec

=== Others ===
- C.D. Once Lobos, a professional Salvadoran football club based in Chalchuapa
- Lobos de Arecibo, a professional baseball team in the Puerto Rican Professional Baseball League, based in Arecibo
- Lobos Athletic Club, an Argentine sports club based in the city of Lobos, Buenos Aires
- Portugal national rugby union team, nicknamed Os Lobos (The Wolves)

== Arts and entertainment ==
- Cuna de lobos, a Mexican telenovela
  - Cuna de lobos (2019 TV series), remake of the above
- Sangre de Lobos, a successful Colombian telenovela produced in 1992

== Other uses ==
- LOBOS, a software program
- Lender option borrower options, a UK financial product
- Lobos FM, a network of radio stations owned by the Universidad Autónoma de Durango
- Operation Lobos 1, a Brazilian-centered 12-country multinational operation to target the operations of a TOR onion service known as Baby Heart

== See also ==
- Lobo (disambiguation)
- Los Lobos (disambiguation)
- Villa-Lobos
