= Elvira (disambiguation) =

Elvira is a feminine given name.

Elvira may also refer to:

== Places ==
- Elvira, Buenos Aires, Argentina, a district of Lobos Partido
- Elvira Island, also known as Kilian Island, in Nunavut, Canada
- Elvira, an ancient administrative area/province in Visigothic and early Moorish times, now known as the Province of Granada
- Elvira, an ancient city in Spain, now called Granada
- Elvira, Illinois, United States
- Elvira, Iowa, United States

== Other uses ==
- 277 Elvira, an asteroid
- Elvira (bird), a genus of emerald hummingbirds
- Elvira (play), a 1763 play David Mallet
- "Elvira" (song), a country song recorded by many artists, most notably by the Oak Ridge Boys in 1981
- Cassandra Peterson, television personality Elvira, Mistress of the Dark
- Elvira, a genus of flowering plants now transferred to Delilia

== See also ==
- Elvira: Mistress of the Dark (disambiguation)
- Synod of Elvira, an ecclesiastical synod held in the early 4th century AD
- Sierra Elvira, a mountain range in the southern Iberian Peninsula - see Subbaetic System
- Elmira (disambiguation)
