= Mario Barrera =

Argentine football manager (born 1963)

Personal information
- Full name: Mario Esteban Barrera Aguiar
- Date of birth: 27 February 1963 (age 63)
- Place of birth: Villa Hernandarias, Argentina
- Position: Forward

Youth career
- Newell's Old Boys

Senior career*
Years	Team	Apps	(Gls)
1982–19XX	Mallorca B		
- → Crevillente (loan)
1988–1989	Avignon		
1989–1990	Douglas Haig	5	(0)

Managerial career
- 1997–2005: Elche (youth)
- 2009: Torrellano Illice
- 2010–2011: Torrevieja
- 2011: Akademik Sofia
- 2016–2017: Eldense
- 2018: Alcoyano
- 2019: Odra Wodzisław (youth)
- 2019: Alcoyano
- 2019–2020: Odra Wodzisław (youth)
- 2020–2021: Odra Wodzisław (assistant)
- * Club domestic league appearances and goals

Mario Esteban Barrera Aguiar (born 27 February 1963) is an Argentine retired footballer who played mainly as a forward, and a current manager.

== Playing career ==
Born in Villa Hernandarias, Barrera played for Newell's Old Boys as a youth before moving to Spain with RCD Mallorca in 1982, along with his brother; however, he was assigned to the reserves in Tercera División. He subsequently served loan stints which notably included Crevillente Deportivo, before moving to France with Olympique Avignon in 1988.

In 1989, Barrera returned to his home country after joining Douglas Haig. In his last active years, he combined his playing career with a sports coordinator role in a local town.

== Managerial career ==
After retiring, Barrera returned to Spain after receiving a managerial offer from CF Lorca Deportiva, but his lack of experience prevented him from taking the role; he instead was named manager of Elche CF's youth sides. He subsequently worked in the technical secretary of the latter club, later being an assistant of Lico during his spells as manager and also being a sporting director.

In September 2007, Barrera was dismissed from the Franjiverdes, after having altercations with manager David Vidal. In July 2009, he agreed to become the manager of Orihuela CF, but the deal was later cancelled by the club's new board.

On 1 October 2009, Barrera was appointed manager of Torrellano Illice CF. He moved was named at the helm of fourth tier side FC Torrevieja the following 9 June, but left on 11 February 2011 to move to Bulgaria.

On 5 December 2011, Barrera returned to Spain after being presented as sporting director of Girona FC. The following 27 March, however, he was sacked.

On 7 October 2016, after more than four years without a club, Barrera was named sporting director of CD Eldense, but became manager of the club thirteen days later, replacing Raúl Garrido. He left the club in January 2017, after the club's change of ownership.

On 28 February 2018, Barrera was appointed CD Alcoyano manager in Segunda División B. After avoiding relegation, he joined Polish side Odra Wodzisław Śląski on 7 February 2019 to work in their youth sides, but returned to Deportivo on 11 March.

After suffering relegation, Barrera returned to Odra on 3 December 2019, again as a youth coach. In March 2020, he became an assistant of the main squad, before leaving the club in 2021.

== Personal life ==
Barrera's older brother Rolando was also a footballer and a forward.
