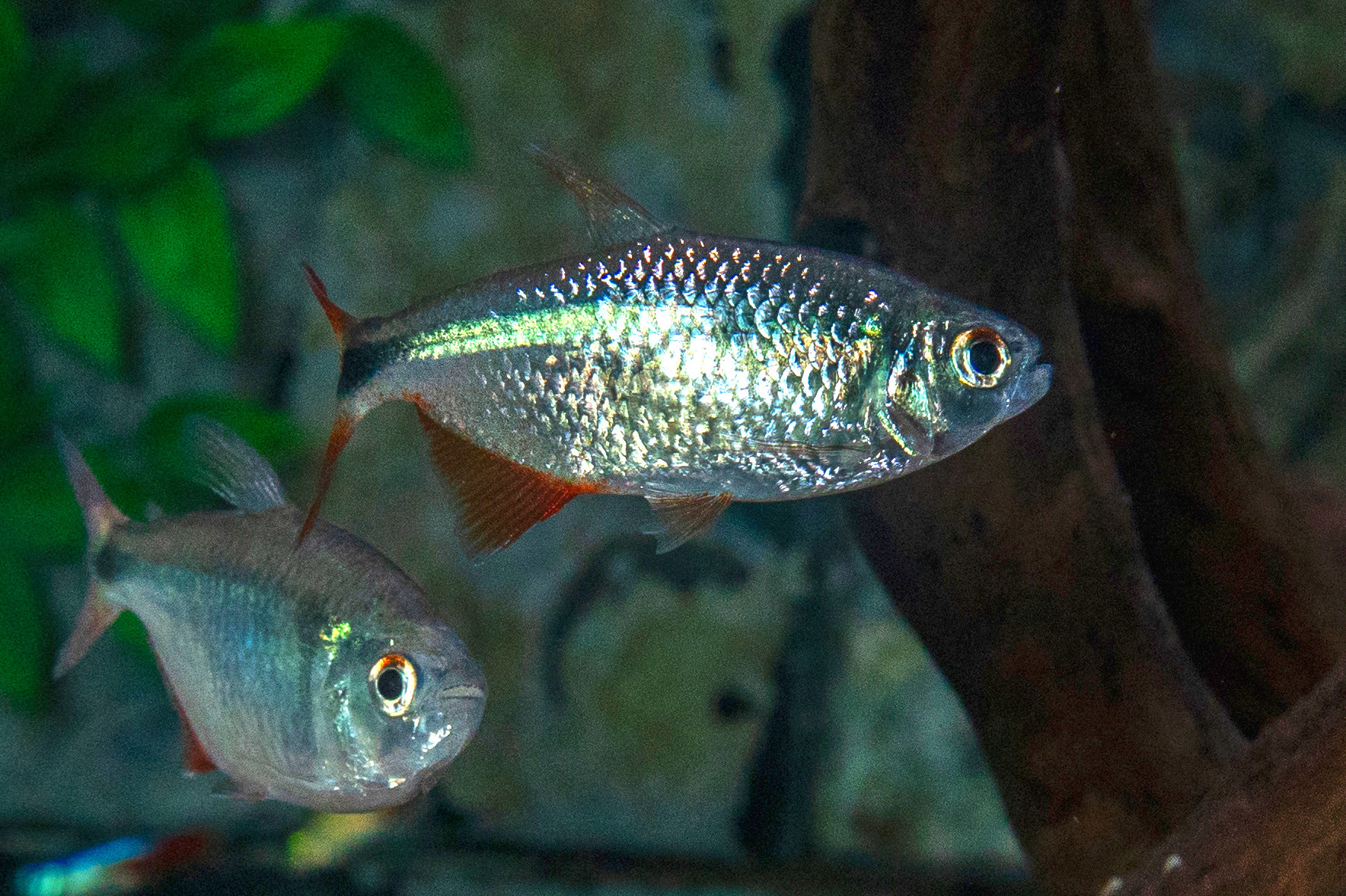

Conservation status
- Least Concern (IUCN 3.1)

Scientific classification
- Kingdom: Animalia
- Phylum: Chordata
- Class: Actinopterygii
- Division: Teleostei
- Order: Characiformes
- Family: Acestrorhamphidae
- Genus: Psalidodon
- Species: P. anisitsi

Binomial name
- Psalidodon anisitsi (C. H. Eigenmann, 1907)

Synonyms
- Hemigrammus anisitsi C. H. Eigenmann, 1907; Hyphessobrycon anisitsi (C. H. Eigenmann, 1907); Hemigrammus caudovittatus Ahl, 1923; Hyphessobrycon erythrurus Ahl, 1928

= Buenos Aires tetra =

Species of fish

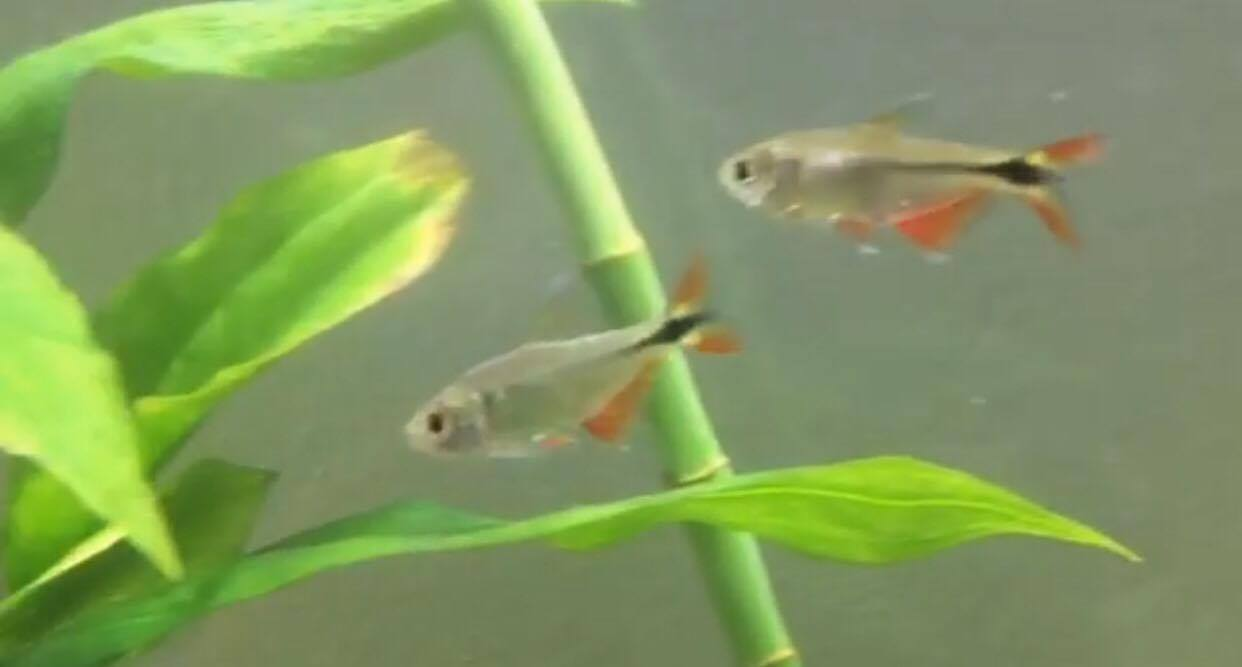
A pair of Buenos Aires tetras.

The Buenos Aires tetra (Psalidodon anisitsi) is a species of freshwater ray-finned fish belonging to the family Acestrorhamphidae, the American characins. This fish is found in South America.

== Taxonomy ==
The Buenos Aires tetra was first formally described as Hemigrammus anisitsi in 1907 by the German-American ichthyologist Carl H. Eigenmann with its type locality given as Villarica on the Río Tebicuary in the Guairá Department of Paraguay. This species is now classified within the genus Psalidodon which is classified within the subfamily Acestrorhamphinae of the American characin family, Acestrorhamphidae which s in the suborder Characoidei of the order Characiformes.

== Geographic origins ==
The Buenos Aires tetra originates from South America, where they are widespread throughout the Río de la Plata Basin in Argentina, Paraguay, Uruguay, and southeastern Brazil. Despite the common name, they are not endemic to its namesake, Buenos Aires Province; and a similar looking fish, Hyphessobrycon togoi largely replaces it here. The type locality is Villarrica in Guairá Department, central Paraguay. In the wild, they are commonly found in rivers, ponds, lakes, and streams. They are a freshwater fish, and do not do well in conditions that may offer too salty or too filthy water. They swim in schools and are a social fish, always together with their own kind.

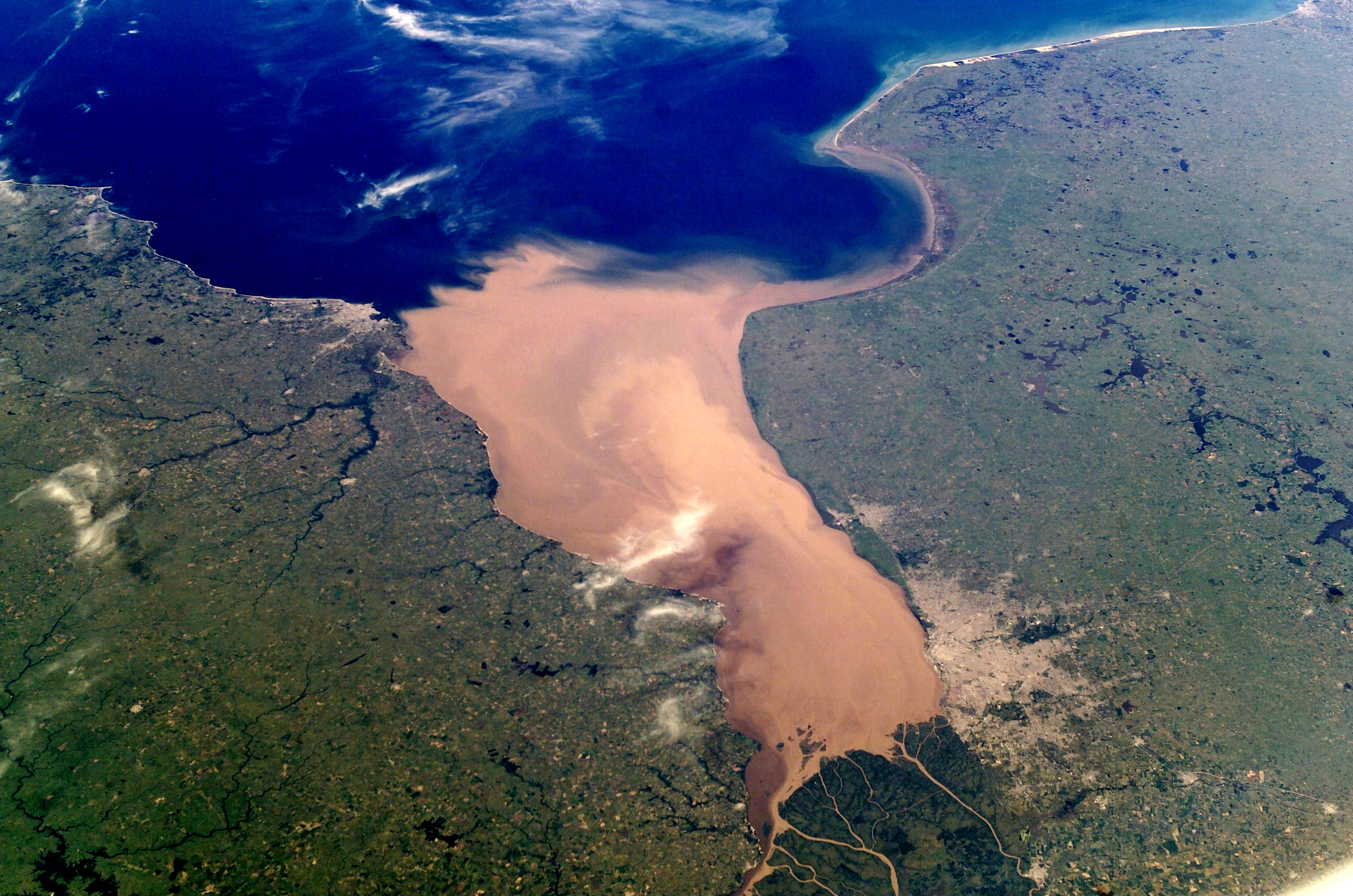
The La Plata estuary.

== Description ==
The tetra is a tropical, silver metallic-colored fish, with red-tipped fins and a black marking on the dorsal fin. The tetra is a hardy community fish for beginners, and is optimal for the beginning fish hobbyist. It is also relatively large for a tetra, growing up to 7.5 cm (3.0 in). They can live up to 5 or 6 years. Its silver color picks up flashy neon highlights depending on how the light hits the fish. The top and bottom of the tail fin is generally red, along with the pelvic and anal fins. The dorsal fin may also have a hint of red at the very tip. Its most distinguishing characteristic is the caudal peduncle, or the connecting area between the tail and the rest of the body, which features a bold, black 'cross' shape.

== Behavior ==
The Buenos Aires tetra are very durable, and do not have any special needs or requirements. A maintained freshwater tank and food is all that they really need. However, they are hearty feeders that must be well-fed or they may begin to nip at their long-finned tank-mates. Keeping the tetras in a school of 5 or more definitely decreases aggression. This species can occasionally nip at and eat aquarium plants.

== Nutrition ==
Buenos Aires tetras are an omnivorous species. In the wild they feed on worms, crustaceans, insects, and plants, but in the aquarium they will generally eat all kinds of live, fresh, and flake foods. To support a healthy diet, feed them a high quality flake food every day. To keep these tetras at their most healthy and colorful, offer regular meals of live and frozen foods, such as bloodworms, Daphnia, and brine shrimp. Vegetables should also be added to their diet. Feed these tetras several times a day and only what they can consume in 3 minutes or less at each feeding to avoid overfeeding.

== Breeding ==
Buenos Aires tetras breed occasionally in an aquarium setting. They breed by scattering their eggs into their environment, while fertilization is left to chance. When breeding does occur, a hospital or "breeding tank" will be necessary. For optimal breeding conditions, use slightly acidic water. Much like most other species of fish, once the eggs begin to hatch, removing the parents will reduce the number of lost fry, as the parents will soon begin to eat their young. Once the eggs are laid, the fry will begin to hatch in about 24 hours. For the next three or four days, they will eat their egg sac and then become free swimming fry.

== See also ==
- List of freshwater aquarium fish species
