= Vizcaíno Island =

Island on Negro river estuary, Uruguay

Coordinates: 33.360°S 58.382°W

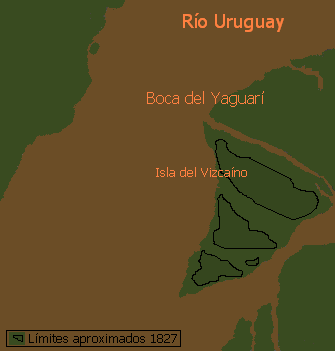
Isla Vizcaíno in the Arroyo Yaguarí

Vizcaíno Island (Spanish: Isla Vizcaíno) is an island in Uruguay located on the Negro River estuary, at its confluence with Uruguay River. It is bordered by the Negro river to the South, Vizcaíno creek to the east, Uruguay river to the North and Yaguarí creek on the West. Yaguarí creek is a narrow deep channel between Vizcaíno island and Lobos Island, and is the main river mouth of the Negro river.

== History ==
The first European settlement on the island came when Jesuits founded the mission of Santo Domingo de Soriano on Isla Vizcaino in 1624, though the mission later relocated to the mainland.

== Economy and population ==
The population began significantly increasing when Pedro Millán began businesses on the island and transferred supplies from other towns. However, the population left the island to escape floods, and they migrated to what is now known as Villa Soriano. They also migrated in order to escape the attacks by hostile indigenous people.

=== Indigenous residents ===
Many native islanders were very protective over their area and were hostile to other people living on the island. Archaeologists have found evidence that the native indigenous population has significantly decreased in the small village of San Miguel del Río Negro.

== Access ==
The closest settlements to the area are Baradero, and Ibucuy port, both in Argentina.
