= Hernando Arias de Saavedra =

Spanish colonial governor (1561–1634)

Hernandarias
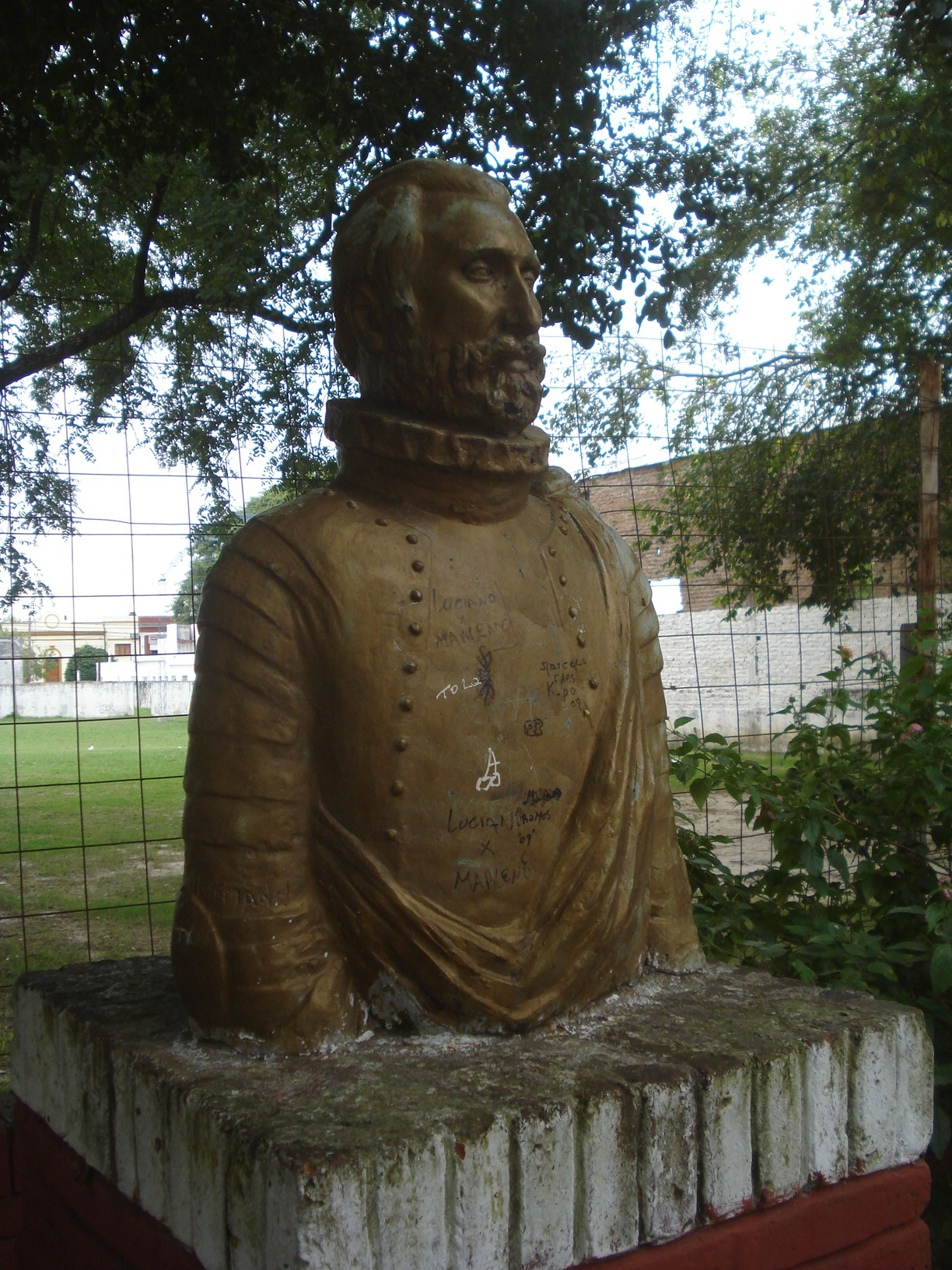
- Born: 10 September 1561; Asunción, Paraguay
- Died: 1634 (aged 72/73); Santa Fe, Argentina
- Occupation: Spanish colonial Governor
- Spouse: Jerónima de Contreras
- Children: Gerónima, Isabel and María
- Parent(s): Martín Suárez de Toledo, María de Sanabria

Hernando Arias de Saavedra (10 September 1561 – 1634), commonly known as Hernandarias, was a soldier and politician of criollo ancestry. He was the first person born in the Americas to become a governor of a European colony in the New World, serving two terms as governor of Governorate of the Río de la Plata, 1597–1599 and 1602–1609, and one of the Governorate of Paraguay 1615–1617.

== Early life ==
Hernandarias was born in Asunción, colonial Paraguay as the second son of María de Sanabria and Martín Suárez, an officer under Álvar Núñez Cabeza de Vaca. He had a sister, Juana de Saavedra, who later married Juan de Garay, the father of Jerónima de Contreras. His maternal grandparents were Diego de Sanabria and Mencia Calderón de Sanabria, who were wealthy from their holdings in Paraguay.

He entered the military at an early age. He participated in the exploration and conquest of the territory of what is now Paraguay and Argentina. His talents as an officer and administrator led to his being named lieutenant-governor of Asunción in 1592 by Juan Ramírez Velasco. He served three terms. While claiming most officials from Spain or Peru were lazy or corrupt, the new governor Diego Rodríguez Valdés Vanda y Lugarteniente wrote about Hernandarias:

Solo en Hernan Darias había vencido la virtud. Aunque los españoles lo tachan de que se inclina siempre a los criollos y mestizos, es muy honrado Cavallero, aunque criollo, porque no hay regla sin excepción.	Only in Hernan Darias has virtue triumphed. Although the Spanish fault him as being inclined always toward the criollos and mestizos, he is an honorable gentleman, for in every rule there is an exception.

In the same period, Hernandarias' half-brother, Hernando de Trejo, was named bishop of the Roman Catholic see of Asunción.

== Governor of Rio de la Plata ==
In 1596 Hernandarias was elected as Lieutenant-Governor of the Rio de la Plata province, including Buenos Aires. In 1597, upon the death of governor Valdés Vanda, King Phillip II ordered captain Francisco de Barraza to name a new governor of the province of Rio de la Plata. Hernandarias was elected unanimously by the caudillo in Asunción as the governor of Rio de la Plata province, including Buenos Aires.

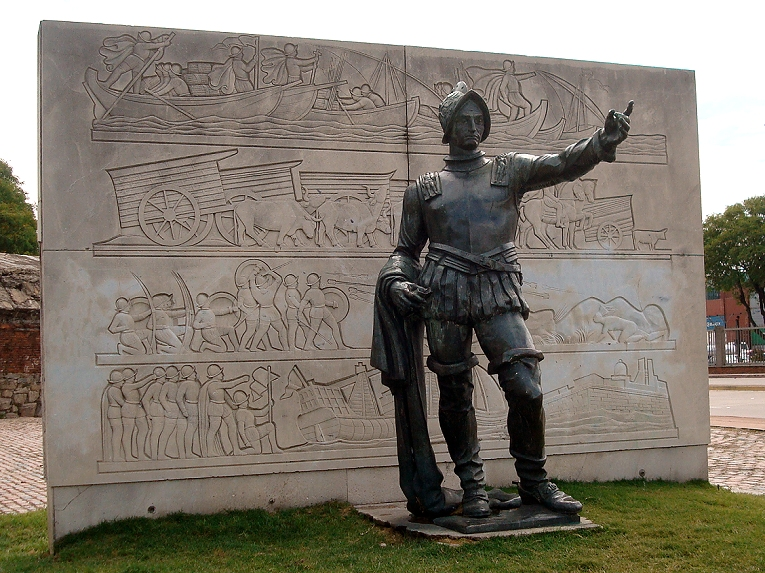
Monument to Hernandarias in Montevideo

Hernandarias served three terms as governor: 1597–1599, 1602–1609, and 1615–1617. As governor, he enacted a number of policies to stimulate the growth of what was at that time a small port town. These included the creation of the first primary schools, kilns for creating bricks and tiles to replace adobe as a construction material, and the rebuilding of a fortress to protect the city from pirates. Following the capture of two anchored ships by English privateers on 18 March 1607, he ordered the construction of a larger fort at the mouth of the Matanza River, in what is now the neighborhood of Vuelta de Rocha. He also enacted measures against smuggling caused by prohibitions on import, export and the African slave trade. During his term as governor of Buenos Aires, Hernandarias started several expeditions, including ones to Uruguay and Brazil to rein in the Portuguese bandeirantes, explore Patagonia, survey the navigability of rivers and to find the mythical City of the Caesars. Eventually in 1604, he was captured by the native Mapuche around 1,000 km south of Buenos Aires. He escaped and survived.

In 1603, Hernandarias changed the rules on Amerindian workers, ending the mita and encomienda labor systems. The Spanish had essentially depended on native labor in exchange for nominally converting them to Christianity. He gained approval for this reform from King Phillip III. In 1608 he arranged the creation of the Jesuit and Franciscan reductions in the region of Guayrá (modern Paraguay). While it relocated many natives, compared to the previous system, it protected them from the ranchers and the encomienda. In 1611, visiting judge Francisco de Alfaro ordered the emancipation of all natives working on encomiendas who had been converted by the Jesuits. His proclamation is known as the Ordenanzas de Alfaro.

As Governor of the Governorate of the Río de la Plata, Hernandarias at the beginning of the 17th century opposed the burgeoning mate industry. He thought it was an unhealthy bad habit, and that too much of the Indian workforce was consumed the drink. He ordered an end to the production in the Governorate of the Río de la Plata, while seeking approval from the Crown. It rejected his ban, as did the people involved in production, who never complied with the order.

== Cathedral of Buenos Aires ==
Hernandarias was directly involved in the relocation of the church in Buenos Aires in 1603. In 1616 craftsmen determined that the church's roof was deteriorating, and, in the course of repairs, the church collapsed. 1618 Hernandarias led the effort to construct the Cathedral of Buenos Aires. Working with carpenter Pascual Ramírez, Hernandarias secured a supply of lumber from Paraguay as well as labor from Spanish colonists and converted natives. On the construction of the Cathedral, Hernandarias wrote in a letter about the construction of the Cathedral:

... la hice derribar y fabriqué de nuevo (...) y así este templo con todos los demás de esta Provincia, de pueblos indios como de las ciudades, hasta la Catedral, puedo decir que las he fabricado no sólo con el trabajo y constancia de mi persona, sino a costa de mi hacienda.	... my deeds demolished and rebuilt (...) and on this temple, and all the rest of the province, from Indian towns to the cities, to the Cathedral, I can say that I have built them not just with my work and perseverance, but at the expense of my estate.

== Official decrees ==
On 7 September 1614 Hernandarias was named governor of Buenos Aires for his third and final term. He assumed the post on 29 May 1615. He introduced an initiative to split the Río de la Plata district in two: the Province of Buenos Aires, and the province of Paraguay, including the settlements of Asunción, Santiago de Jerez, Villa Rica and Ciudad Real. Though ordered in 1617, the partition needed the approval of the king, which was granted in 1618. The change was not carried out until 1620. After the expiry of his term in 1617, Hernandarias was succeeded as governor by Diego de Góngora.

== Marriage and family ==
In his personal life, he was married to Jerónima de Contreras with whom he had three daughters: Gerónima, Isabel and María Hernandarias retired with his wife to Santa Fe, Argentina, where he died in 1634 at the age of 72. His remains and those of his wife were interred at the convent of San Francisco, in Santa Fe.

== Legacy ==
The Arms of the Argentine city of Villa Hernandarias are derived from an old seal used by the governor.

- The city of Hernandarias in Paraguay and the city of Villa Hernandarias in Entre Rios Province of Argentina were both named after him. As well as the Hernandarias Subfluvial Tunnel in Argentina until it was renamed in 2001.

== Cattle introduction in the Banda Oriental ==
In 1604 Hernandarias traveled six month along Uruguay and Negro rivers looking for wood, coal and canes supplies on the Uruguay River Eastern Bank (Spanish: Banda Oriental). On his return to Buenos Aires he reported to King Felipe III of Spain describing those lands as excellent for cattle raising, and suggesting they be populated. The King didn't heed his advice but in 1610 he deeded Hernandarias with the "Natural Peoples Protector" title and two islands at the confluence of Uruguay and negro rivers, present day Vizcaíno and Lobos islands. In 1611 Hernandarias disembarked fifty heifers and some bulls in Lobos Island and reached an agreement with the natives to protect animals with calves. He repeated the operation in 1617 with another fifty animals and the same number in San Gabriel Island on the Colonia coast. This act originated a great cattle herd in the region, the exploitation of which was determinant in the historical processes lending to colonization of present-day Uruguay, so far overlooked by Spaniards.

The territory pastures proved to be very favourable for bovine reproduction, and the abundance of cattle attracted Portuguese incursions from Brazil, Colonia del Sacramento foundation by Portugal (1678) and Montevideo foundation by Spain (1726).
