= Lobos Island (Rio Negro) =

Island in Uruguay

Coordinates: 33°23′S 58°24′W

Lobos (Spanish: Isla de Lobos, pronounced [ˈizla ðe ˈloβos]) is a big island in Uruguay, at the confluence of Negro River (Spanish: Río Negro) and Uruguay River. (Note: There is another Isla de Lobos in Uruguay, on the Atlantic Ocean south from Punta del Este, Maldonado Department, named after Sea lions.) Politically it belongs to Rio Negro department. Until the 19th century, the island was three separate islets, the largest of which was known as Vizcaíno.

Lobos and Vizcaino Island were the debarkation site of the first bovine herd in the Eastern margin of the Uruguay River. In 1611, Hernando Arias de Saavedra (Hernandarias) left heifers and bulls for breeding, and repeated the action in 1617. These herds rapidly propagated originating Uruguay present export quality rodeo. It also had an important role in the foundation of Villa Soriano, the first European settlement in Uruguay.

== Origin of name ==
The island name (Note: Google maps erroneously names this island as Lobes) comes from the abundant otter colonies. At one time there were giant river otters (Ptenoura brasiliensis paraguensis, Spanish: Lobo de río) now believed extinct, but the name may also refer to the still plentiful long tailed river otter (Lontra longicaudis, Spanish: Lobito de río).

== Geography ==
Lobos is one of the largest islands (1,250 hectares (3,100 acres)) in the delta formed at the confluence of Uruguay and Negro Rivers. Born in the southern Brazil highlands 750 km away, at its end Negro River splits in two main water courses that meet the Uruguay: Yaguarí Mouth (Spanish: Boca del Yaguarí) to the Northeast and False Mouth (Spanish: Boca falsa) to the Southwest, with Lobos Island between them. All sides of the vaguely triangular island have different water flows: Yaguarí creek (Spanish: Brazo del Yaguarí) is a narrow deep channel that changes flow direction when Uruguay River is high, while at the Negro River at the False Mouth is very wide but much shallower, only navigable for small draft vessels. Uruguay River, on the other hand has a large width at this point, with a navigable channel deep enough for cargo vessels coming and going from main cargo ports up and downstream: Fray Bentos and Nueva Palmira. Other islands in the delta are Yaguarí and Vizcaíno on the right bank of Yaguarí Creek, and Redonda, del Medio, Pepe Ladrón, Santiago Chico and Villeta Islands on the False Mouth.

The island has three distinct geological zones. The wetlands (CONEAT 03.11) along the Uruguay River coast are low with a coastal dune that is overcome by floods and then retains the water. The other two coasts (CONEAT 03.2) are of medium height, formed by old river sediments of sand and clay. They are slowly flooded when the Uruguay River level rises and prevents the Negro to flow. Soils have high fertility and poor drainage, covered by native trees and shrubs. The prairie (CONEAT 03.3) is the highest level due to a crystalline basement, with fertile soils, grass vegetation and sparse trees.

Lobos island can be approached by land after a four-hour drive from Montevideo or Buenos Aires to Villa Soriano, which lies at 5 km upstream Negro River. Boats reach it navigating the Uruguay River: downstream from Salto (Uruguay) or Concordia (Argentina) or upstream from Colonia del Sacramento (Uruguay) or Buenos Aires (Argentina) or else navigating Negro River, from 80 km inland.

== Flora and fauna ==
Lobos Island is the end of the large Negro River basin that divides Uruguay in all its extension. Both Uruguay and Negro rivers have sources in tropical zones and are biological corridors for animal and vegetal species from inside the continent.

The Yaguarí and Negro banks are lined with native gallery forest. The ceibo trees (Erythrina crista-galli) are abundant along the False Mouth sandy beach, full of red flowers in spring. Other trees in the first line from the water are criollo Willows (Salix humboltiana) and Espinillos (Acacia caven). In the higher parts, trees and shrubs are more sparse over an evergreen grass cover. Hard timber thorny species like Algarrobo (Prosopis nigra), Ñandubay (Prosopis algarrobilla) and Coronilla (Scutia buxiflora) grow beside the occasional Caranday palm (Trithrinax campestris).

The wetland area has herbaceous associations of heliophyte plants like Paja mansa (Panicum prionitis) or Pampa grass (Cortaderia sellowiana) with lower plants like Verbenas (Senecio bonariensis) or Cattails (Tipha angustifolia). The Yaguarí creek has abundant aquatic vegetation, dominated by Water hyacinth (Eichornia crassipes). Small mammals, rodents, reptiles, insects, arachnids and crustaceans thrive in the wetlands.

Birds are abundant, associated to the different environments in the island. Notable ones are: Black-necked swans (Cygnus melancorypus) and Anhinga darter (Anhinga anhinga) on the Uruguay River coast; Crane hawk (Geranospiza caerulescens flexipes) and Roseate spoonbill (Ajaia ajaja) in the wetlands; Collared plover (Charadius collaris) and Kingfisher (Chloroceryle americana mathewsii) on the waterside; Woodcreeper (Drymornis bridgesii) and Red-crested cardinal (Paroaria coronata) in the native woods.

The Negro River basin registers more than 120 freshwater fish species, some of then exclusive to the area. The confluence is a mandatory passage for large migratory species such as Surubi (Pseudoplatystuma corruscans), Dorado (Salminus brasiliensis), Iridescent tararira (Hoplias lacerdae), Sábalo (Prochilodus lineatus) and Boga (Leposinus obtusidens), highly sought by sport fishermen. These and many other species of commercial value sustain the local artisanal fishery.

== History ==
=== Pre-Hispanic inhabitants ===
Men inhabited the Uruguay banks since they appeared in this South America region. Ceramic utensils found in the Uruguay-Negro confluence were dated as early as 3.000 years before present times, when sea level was about 6 meters higher. A second group of findings from 2.000 years B.P. speaks of riverside economy societies identified with the Chanás ethnic, while later findings mark the combined presence of Tupí - Guaraní groups in contact with Spanish and Portuguese expeditions.

European presence in the region dates from the 16th century. In 1520 the caravel Santiago under captain Juan Rodríguez Serrano of the Armada de Molucca fleet led by Ferdinand Magellan entered the Rio de la Plata but it was only in 1527 that Sebastian Cabot sailed a little north of the Negro confluence before returning downriver to establish a fort in San Salvador River.

=== Introduction of cattle in the Uruguay River East Bank ===
Until the 17th century, the territories east of Uruguay River (Banda Oriental) were largely devoid of European presence. In 1607, Paraguay Governor Hernando Arias de Saavedra (Hernandarias) embarked from Santa Fe to explore Uruguay River in search of cane, timber and coal supplies. He reported to King Philip III of Spain the existence of lands notably suited for cattle breeding and agricultural exploitation, and recommended they be colonized for the Crown. The King didn't heed his advice but in 1610 deeded Hernandarias two islands on the Negro River as recognition for his services: present day Lobos and Vizcaino.

In 1611, Hernandarias disembarked 50 heifers and some bulls on his islands, brought from his ranch in Santa Fe. He repeated the operation in 1617 with another 50 heifers and an additional 50 in San Gabriel Island in the Rio de la Plata and reached an understanding with the natives to avoid killing pregnant animals. In 1628, Hernandarias claimed before King Philip IV of Spain exclusive ownership or all cattle east of the Uruguay River, by then many thousand heads.

This original rodeo descended from herds brought to America from Zárate (Spain) to Terija Estancia in Upper Peru and then into Asunción. They were of the Hispano-American breed Samson: dark colored, big bodied and long horned, analog to present day Miura. With abundant food and water and no natural enemies except humans, the herds reproduced and soon expanded to the territory of present-day Uruguay. They are the basis of what is even today the country's main export product.

=== Foundation of Santo Domingo Soriano ===
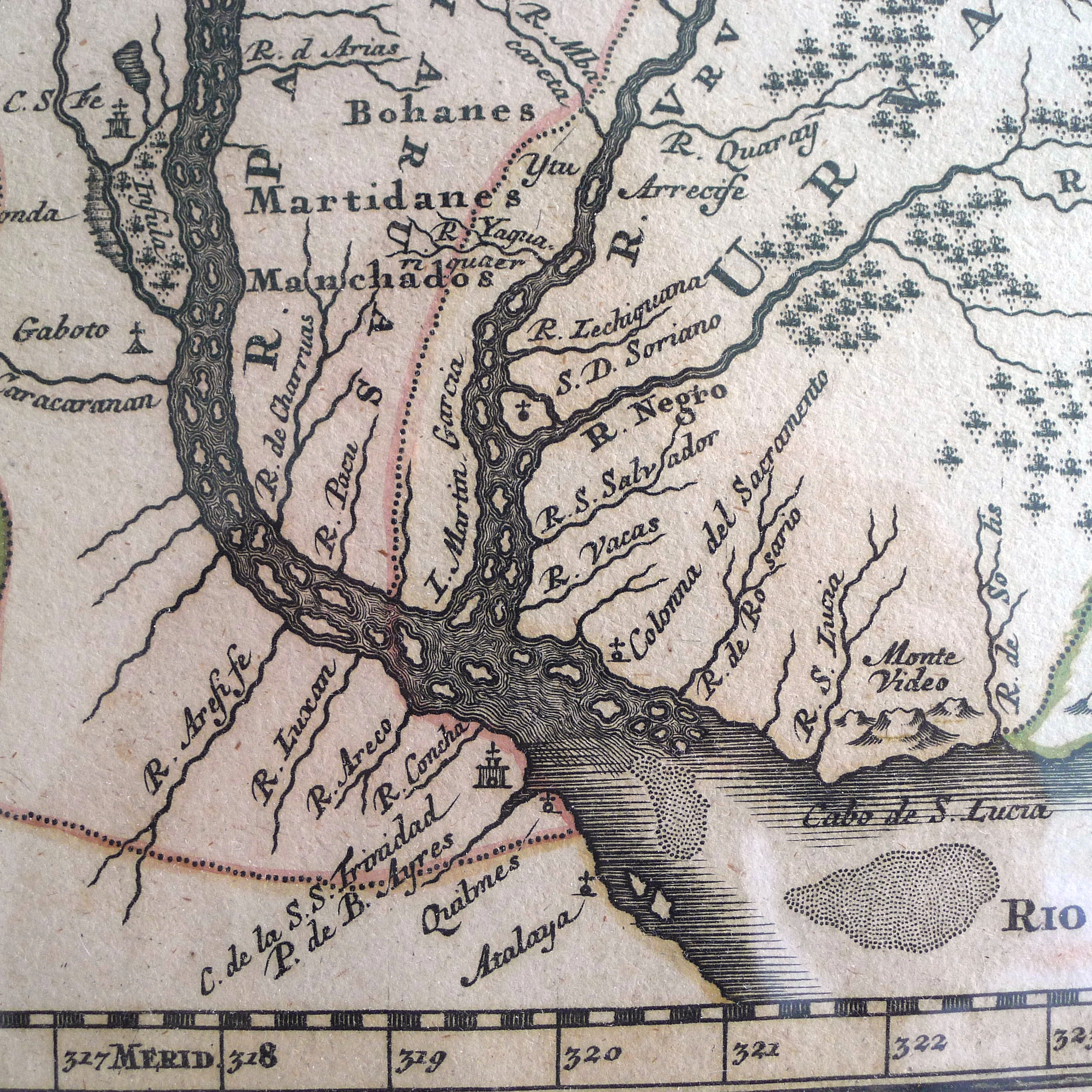
Fragment of a 1740 Matthäus Seutter map showing Lobos Island and Santo Domingo Soriano.

Lobos Island – then called Vízcaíno – was also the foundation site of the first permanent European settlement on the Banda Oriental. In 1624, Franciscan Fray Juan de Vergara founded the San Francisco de los Olivares Reduction on Yaguarí Creek following orders from Fray Bernardino de Guzmán, Provincial Vicar of Paraguay and Tucumán. The Reduction was populated with Chaná natives, criollos from Paraguay and a Castilian Corregidor, but was abandoned after a few years. The settlement pre-dated the foundation of Colonia del Sacramento by more than 50 years.

Captain José Bermúdez fortified the old settlement site in 1702 and it was a provisioning post during the 1704 war against Portugal. Later the place received population from the Chaná - Charrúa Santo Domingo Soriano reduction, founded in 1664 on the other bank of the Uruguay. After a huge flood, in 1708 Lieutenant José Gómez signed a petition (Spanish: documento de trasladación) to the King to transfer the village. The population move upstream to its present location on the Rio Negro was finally accomplished in 1718.

=== Colonial times and first independent years ===
In times of almost non existent roads communications were mostly fluvial, and the two largest Banda Oriental rivers´ confluence was a strategic enclave. In the first colonial years the right Uruguay River bank supplied wood, coal and canes to the growing cities on the other bank. After the natives were more or less pacified, Negro River water was shipped to Spain, where it was appreciated for its curative properties. Many episodes in the Uruguay independence fights started in the area: national hero José Artigas lived in Villa Soriano (1790-1804); The Asencio Cry (1811) that fired up the revolution was uttered a few kilometers Negro upriver; the Thirty Three Easterners Liberation Cruzade (April 19, 1825) started in Agraciada Beach, Uruguay downriver and its first significant military victory -the September 1825 Rincon Battle- took place in the "corner" formed by Uruguay and Negro rivers. In 1826 During the Cisplatine War the Argentine squadron confronted the Third Imperial Division of Brazil in Yaguarí creek, starting operations that would end in the battle of Juncal. In independent times, Lobos Island was refuge for the Colorado faction in the Great Civil War (1839-1851).

=== Fluvial trade on Uruguay and Negro Rivers ===
In the early 20th Century, there were regular passenger boat routes up and down the Negro River. Small draft boats took people to the Yaguarí Mouth where they waited for bigger vessels doing the Salto-Buenos Aires route. The transfer was made in the Uruguay channel and was many times uncertain because pressed for time ships wouldn't stop, or downright dangerous on very windy days. At least two shipwrecks lie in Lobos Island waters: paileboat Pepito Donato (1896) and paileboat Ella (1901). Cargo transit was also intense in the area during the 19th and early 20th centuries, when Villa Soriano was the largest livestock export port in the country and a curative baths station.

== Production ==
To this day, Lobos Island is dedicated to open air cattle breeding. The wetlands are kept as a natural reserve, as well as the native forest along the shores, selectively cleared to provide shadow. The wetlands assure an abundant freshwater supply in long draughts while the higher lands stay above water even in the greatest floods such as the 1959 ones, when they served as refuge. Animals are allowed to roam free with horseback supervision.

== Tourism ==
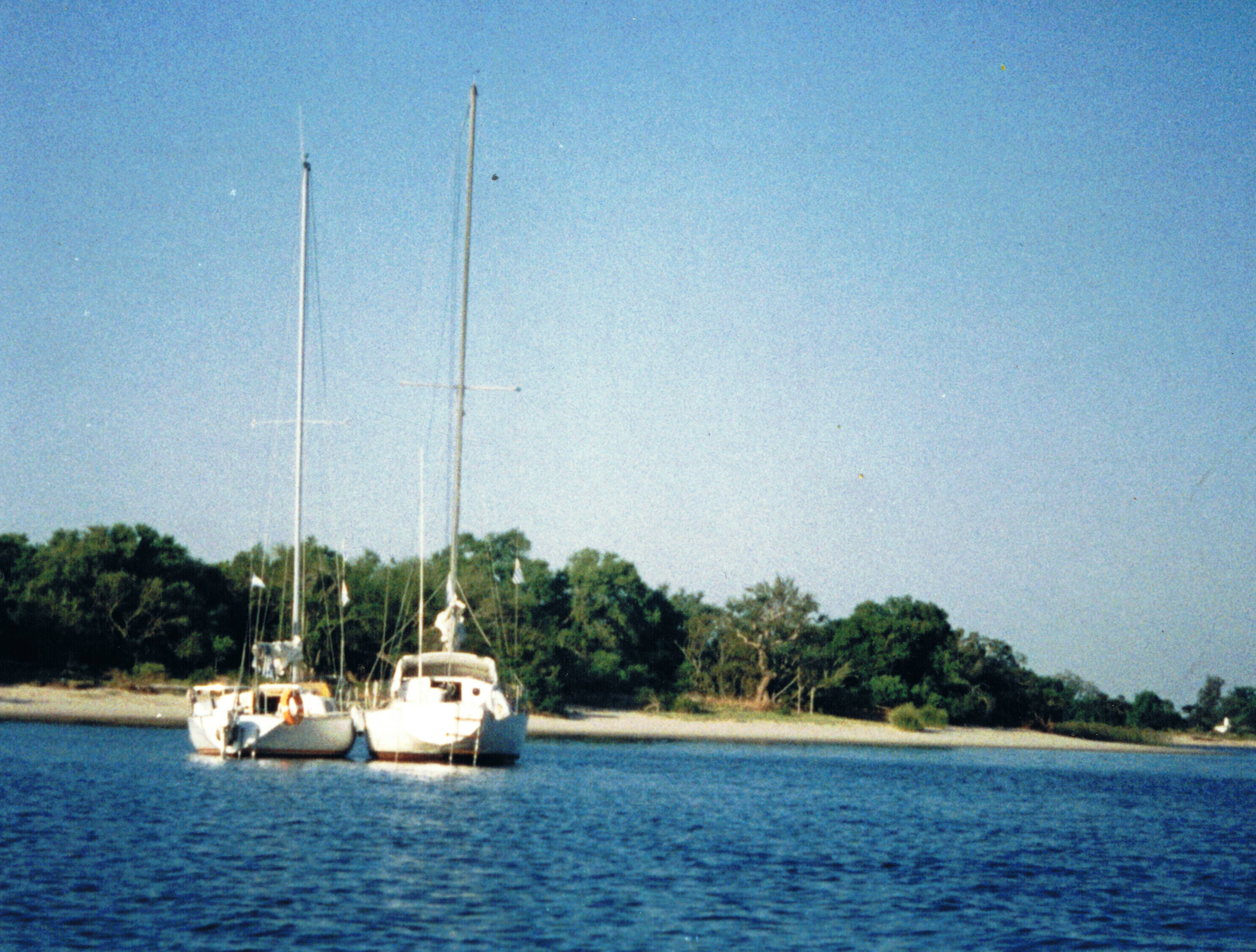
Sailboats anchored in Negro river False Mouth with Lobs Island beach

Lobos is part of the governmental program Painted Birds Region (Spanish: Corredor de los Pájaros Pintados), named after the poetic interpretation of the Guaraní word Uruguay. The program reinforced the touristic infrastructure of departments along the Uruguay River and encourages regional attractions in sports, gastronomy, traditional activities and popular feasts. In Villa Soriano, the historic wooden pier was restored and equipped for pleasure vessels and is the first tourist landing place on the Negro River.

=== Boating ===
Sport boating along the Uruguay and Negro Rivers takes place year round but is especially popular in summer. Apart from vessels of all sizes and types sailing by solo, flotilla passages and regattas are regularly organized from ports in Uruguay and Argentina, both up or downriver. Yaguarí creek and False Mouth are favored places for day excursions or for waiting good conditions for entering the Uruguay waters. Canoe and kayak trips are also frequent, as well as simple cruises with locals.

=== Fishing ===
The Negro and Uruguay River confluence is a propitious place for sport fishing. The different water flow speeds, riverbed depth and chemical composition on the three sides of Lobos Island offer a variety of fishing conditions and their corresponding species. Particularly coveted are the Surubi and Iridescent tararira usually caught by trolling and the Dorado caught by fly-fishing from coast or boat. Fishing excursions to the place are regularly organized and there are local guides in Villa Soriano.

=== Other activities ===
Lobos Island is a private estancia, but with the owners´ permission, it is possible to enjoy a day at the white sand beach on the False Mouth, horse riding on the swamps, bird watching in all the different eco environments and nature walks on the prairie and native woods.
