= Juan Gil Zambrano =

Spanish military officer

Teniente de Gobernador y Justicia Mayor of Buenos Aires
- In office 1609–1611
- Monarch: Philip III
- Preceded by: Juan de Vergara
- Succeeded by: Manuel de Frías

Personal details
- Born: 16th century Spain
- Died: 17th century Buenos Aires, Argentina
- Spouse: María Martínez

Military service
- Allegiance: Spain
- Branch/service: Spanish Army
- Rank: Captain

Juan Gil Zambrano (16th century – 17th century) was a Spanish military officer. He served during the Viceroyalty of Peru as Lieutenant Governor of Buenos Aires.

== Biography ==
Zambrano arrived at the port of Buenos Aires towards the end of 1609 in the ship "Espiritu Santo", accompanying Diego Martínez Negron, the successor of Hernandarias, in the governorship of the Río de la Plata. In the city marries to María Martinez, possibly related to Diego Martínez Negron.

Juan Gil Zambrano was appointed Lieutenant Governor and Justiciary by the same Martínez Negron in 1609, and was replaced by Manuel de Frias on June 17, 1611.
