= Rolando Barrera =

Argentine footballer

Personal information
- Full name: Rolando Ramón Barrera Aguiar
- Date of birth: 18 October 1960 (age 66)
- Place of birth: Villa Hernandarias, Entre Ríos Province, Argentina
- Position: Striker

Senior career*
Years	Team	Apps	(Gls)
1977–1981	Newell's Old Boys	99	(22)
1982	Nueva Chicago	31	(5)
1982–1985	RCD Mallorca	90	(33)
1985–1986	Nice	18	(2)
1986–1988	San Lorenzo	21	(5)
1989–1990	Instituto Córdoba	15	(0)
1990–1991	Colón de Santa Fe	23	(1)

International career
1979	Argentina U-20	6	(0)
- * Club domestic league appearances and goals

Rolando Barrera (born 18 October 1960 in Entre Ríos Province) is an Argentine former football striker.

His younger brother Mario was also a footballer.
