= Rincón del Bonete Reservoir =

- Location within Uruguay
- Location: Tacuarembó Department and Durazno Department, Uruguay
- Coordinates: 32°40′0″S 56°0′0″W
- Type: artificial lake
- Surface area: 1,240 square kilometres (480 sq mi)
- Surface elevation: 86 metres (282 ft)

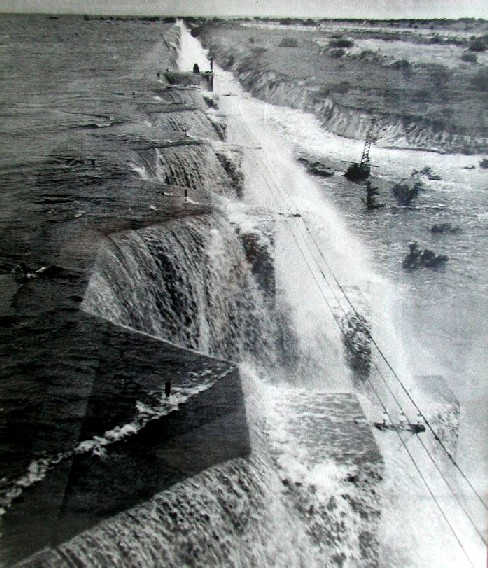
View of the Dam of Rincón del Bonete during the overflow of 1959.

The Rincón del Bonete Reservoir is the largest body of fresh water in Uruguay. It is located in the middle of the country in the south part of Tacuarembó Department with a small part of it reaching into the north part of Durazno Department.

Rincón del Bonete is an artificial lake formed by a dam on the course of Río Negro. It was built in 1945 and has a surface of about 1,240 square kilometres (480 sq mi). The dam was overtopping during the 1959 floods, and the hydroelectric facilities damaged.

The riverine tug Don Pancho was assigned to the transport of building materials and supplies from Salto during the construction of the dam, between 1937 and 1946. She was later used to evacuate local residents in the course of the 1959 floods. The vessel was eventually converted into a patrol boat. Don Pancho sank in the waters of the lake in January 2016 though she was raised a few days later.

== Images ==
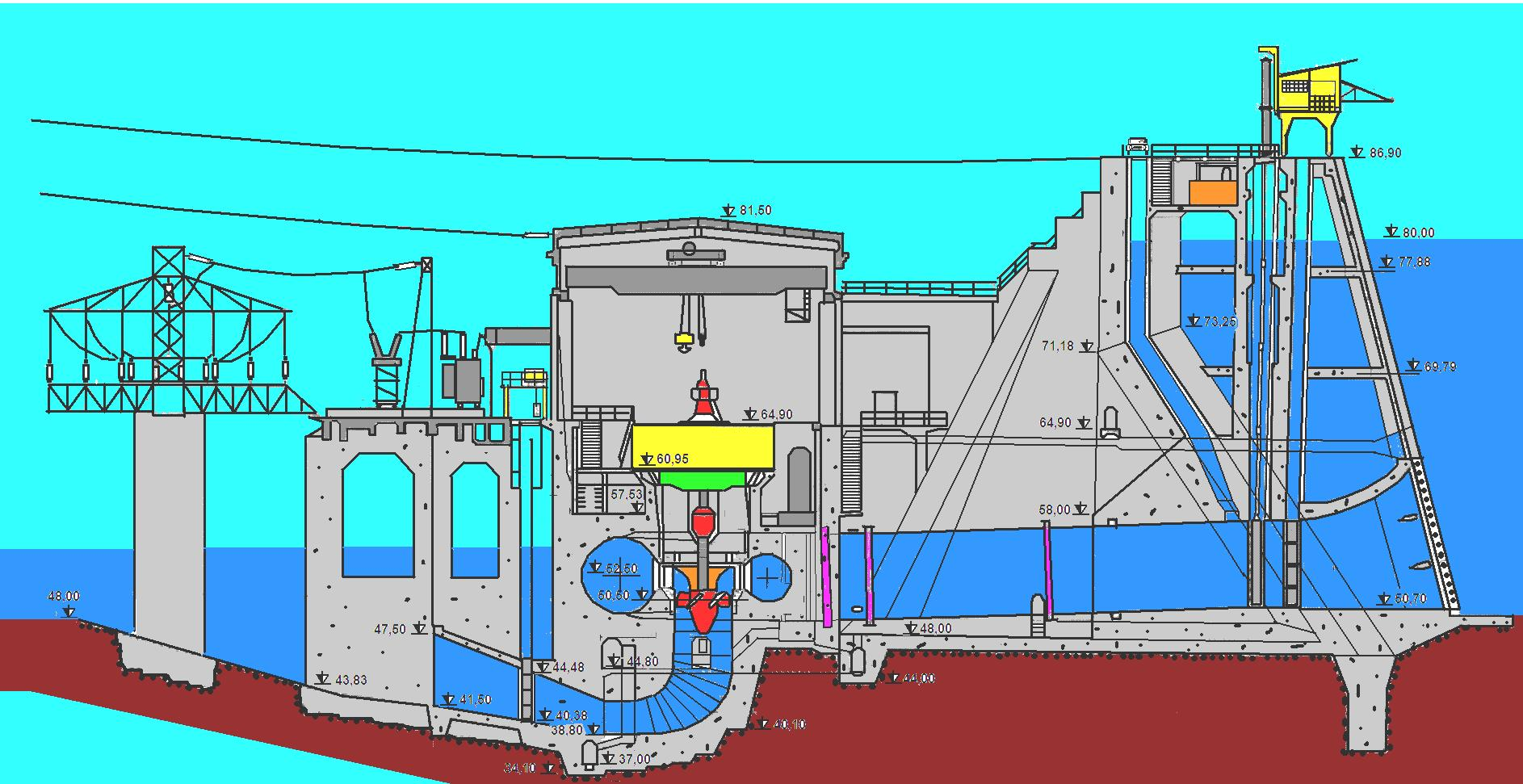
The hydroelectric generator of Rincón del Bonete.

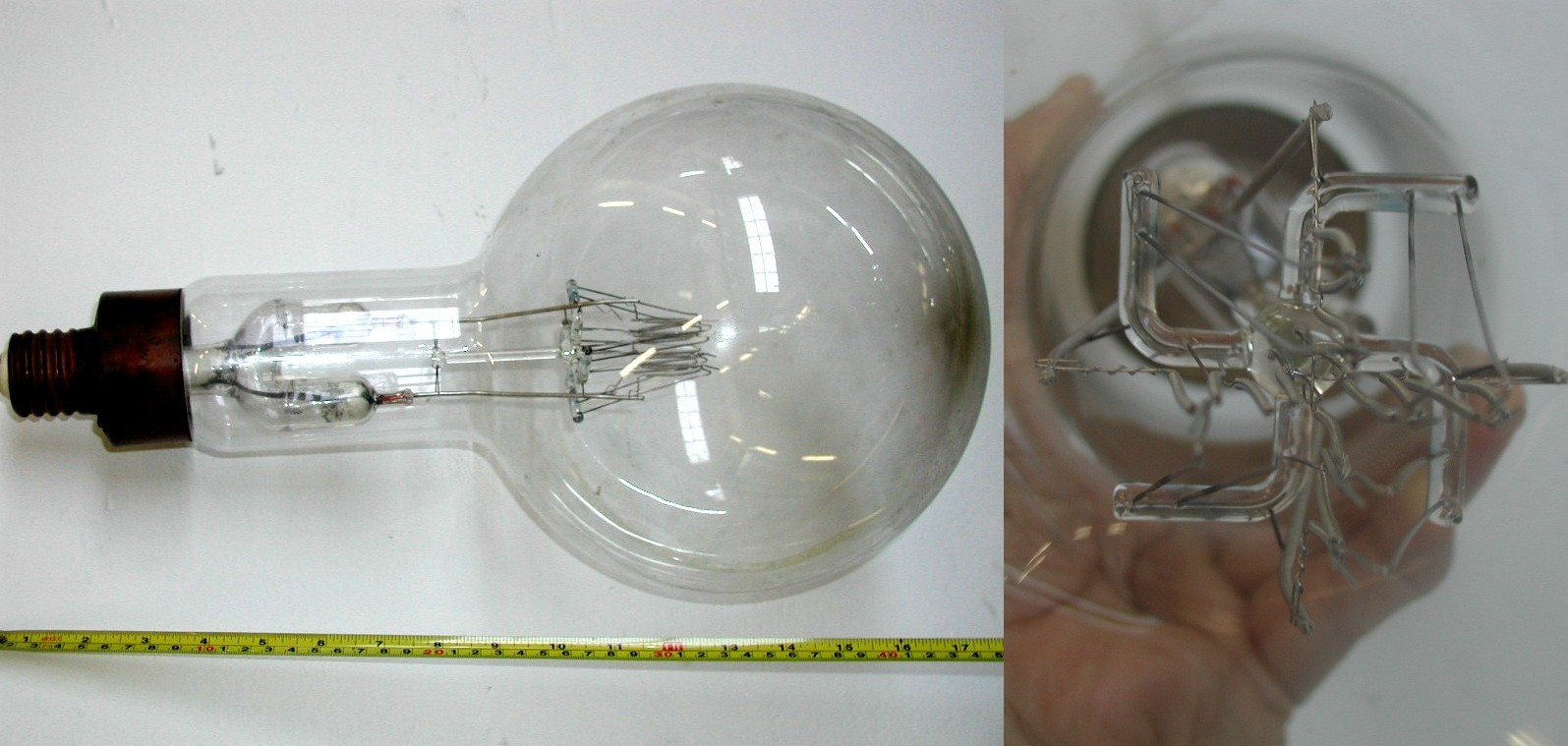
One of the dam museum relics; a Nazi bulb from the Rincón del Bonete aerial BBT lighthouse.
