= Elvira, Buenos Aires =

Elvira
- Town
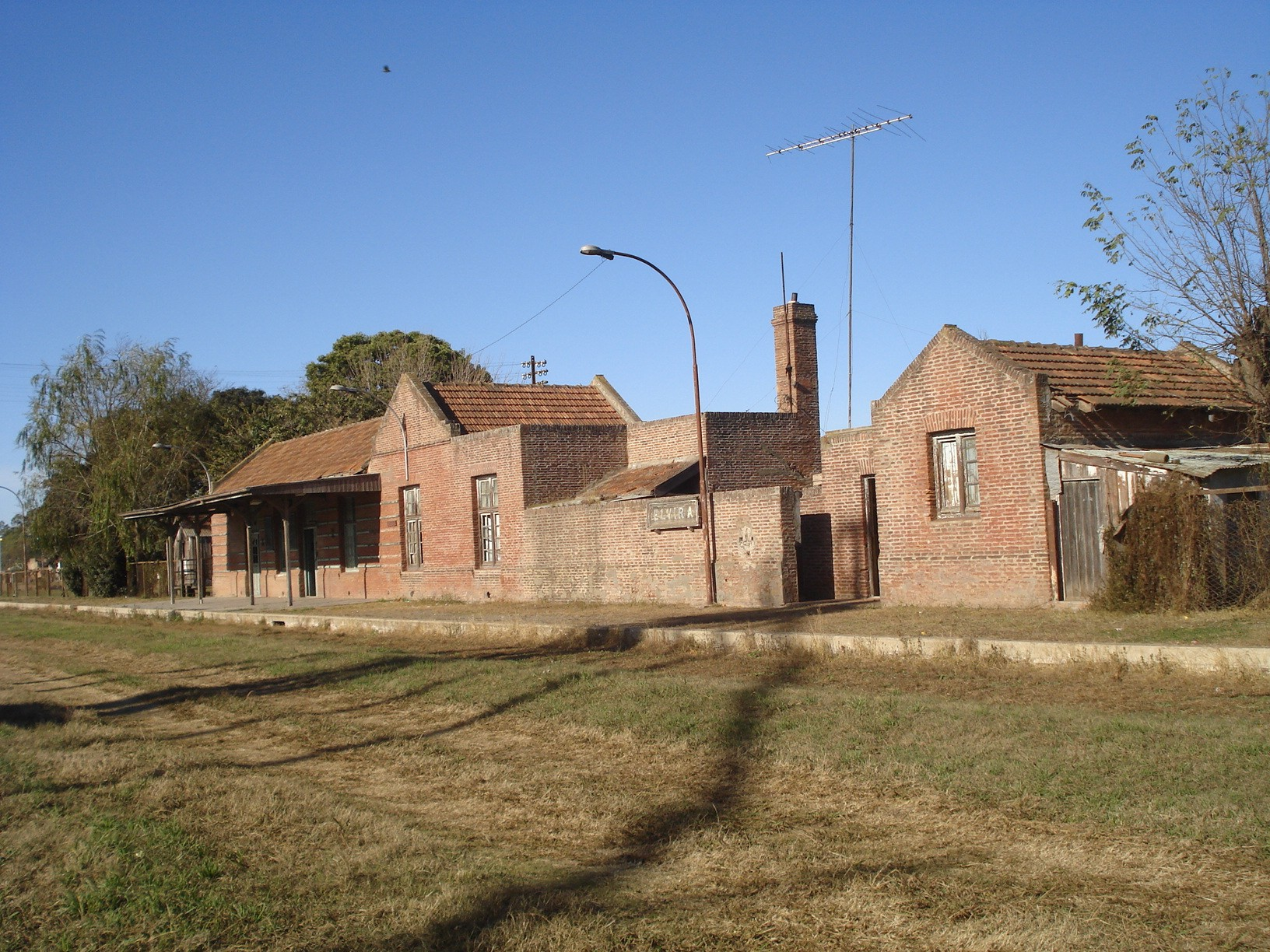
- Train station

- Location within Buenos Aires Province
- Coordinates: 35°14′S 59°29′W
- Country: Argentina
- Province: Buenos Aires
- Partidos: Lobos
- Established: 1898

Population (2001 Census)
  - Total: 170
- Time zone: UTC−3 (ART)
- CPA Base: B 7243
- Climate: Dfc

Elvira is a town located in the Lobos Partido in the province of Buenos Aires, Argentina.

== Geography ==
Elvira is located 38 km (24 mi) from the regional seat of Lobos and 143 km (89 mi) from the city of Buenos Aires.

== History ==
Elvira was founded in 1898 following the construction of a railway station, which has since been converted to a library. The town was named after the owner of the land where Elvina was founded.

== Population ==
According to INDEC, which collects population data for the country, the town had a population of 170 people as of the 2001 census.
