= Antonio Carboni =

- Town
- Location within Buenos Aires Province
- Coordinates: 35°12′S 59°20′W
- Country: Argentina
- Province: Buenos Aires
- Partidos: Lobos
- Established: October 14, 1896

Population (2001 Census)
  - Total: 310
- Time zone: UTC−3 (ART)
- CPA Base: B 7243
- Climate: Dfc

Antonio Carboni is a town located in the Lobos Partido in the province of Buenos Aires, Argentina.

== Geography ==
Antonio Carboni is located 129 km (80 mi) from the city of Buenos Aires.

== History ==
Antonio Carboni was founded on October 14, 1896, upon the founding of a railway station operated by the Southern Railway Company. The town was established on the lands of an estancia responsible for dairy production owned by a landowner who gave the town its name. The laying out of the town began in 1916.

In 1928, a church, led by architect Alejandro Bustillo, was constructed in the center of the town, inspired by an abandoned church of the type in Italy. In 1963, the church was elevated to the status of a parish and assumed the name of Sagrada Familia. In 2000, the church was declared a cultural site by the Argentine government.

== Population ==
According to INDEC, which collects population data for the country, the town had a population of 310 people as of the 2001 census.
