= Los Lobos (disambiguation) =

Los Lobos is an American rock band from East Los Angeles, California

Los Lobos may refer to:

- Los Lobos del Este de Los Angeles, first album by Los Lobos
- Los Lobos (Baby Rasta & Gringo album), music album by Baby Rasta & Gringo
- Los Lobos (film), a 2019 Mexican family drama film
- Los Lobos (gang), Ecuadorian criminal organization
- Los Lobos, Texas, a census-designated place in Zapata County, Texas, United States

== See also ==
- Lobos (disambiguation)
