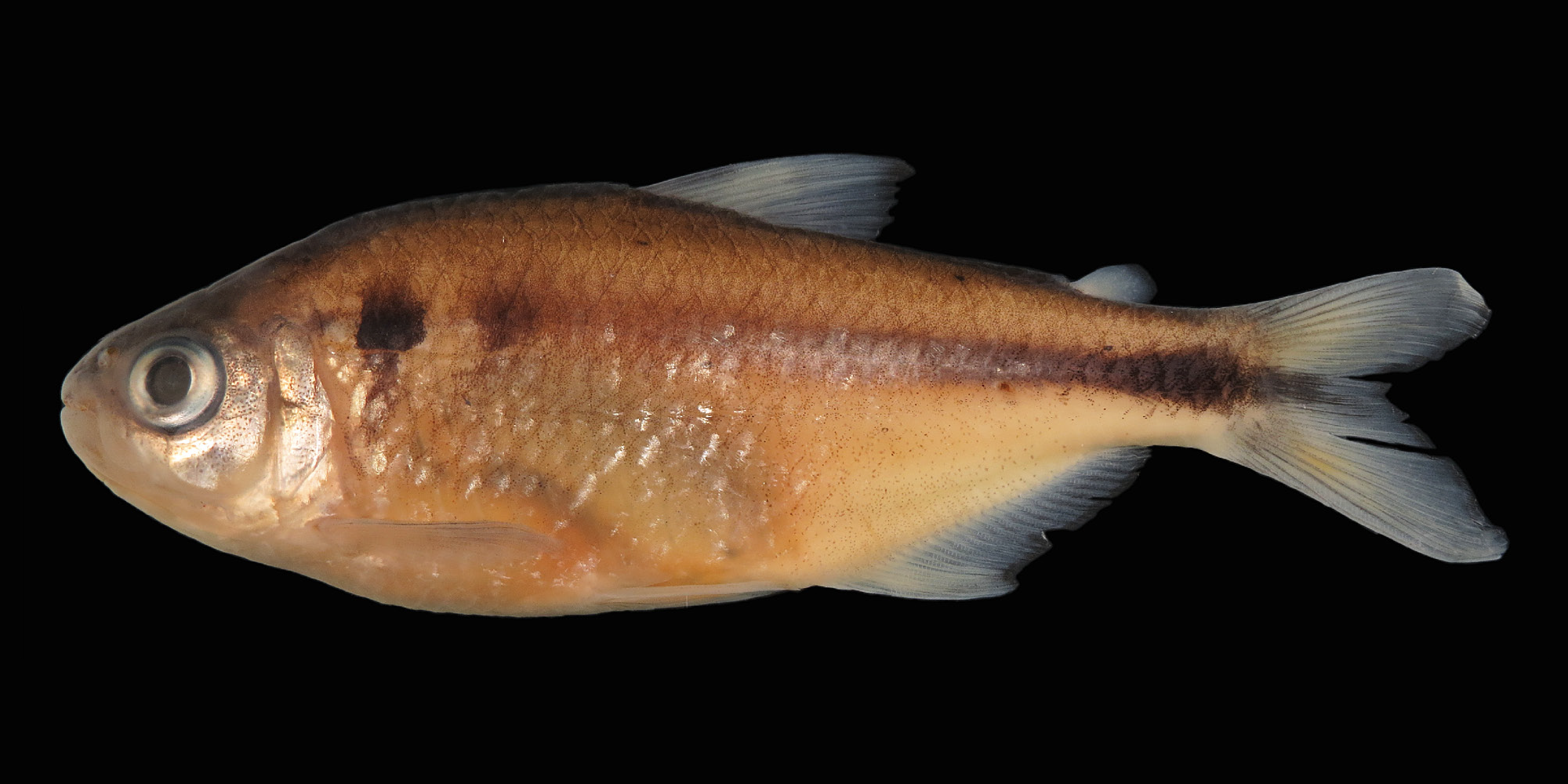
- Preserved specimen

Conservation status
- Least Concern (IUCN 3.1)

Scientific classification
- Kingdom: Animalia
- Phylum: Chordata
- Class: Actinopterygii
- Order: Characiformes
- Family: Acestrorhamphidae
- Genus: Psalidodon
- Species: P. bifasciatus

Binomial name
- Psalidodon bifasciatus (Garavello & Sampaio, 2010)

Synonyms
- Astyanax bifasciatus Garavello & Sampaio, 2010

= Psalidodon bifasciatus =

Species of fish

Psalidodon bifasciatus is a species of freshwater ray-finned fish belonging to the family Acestrorhamphidae, the American characins. This fish is found in the Rio Iguaçu basin and upper Rio Paraná basin of Brazil and Argentina. It grows up to 12.9 cm (5.1 in) in length.
