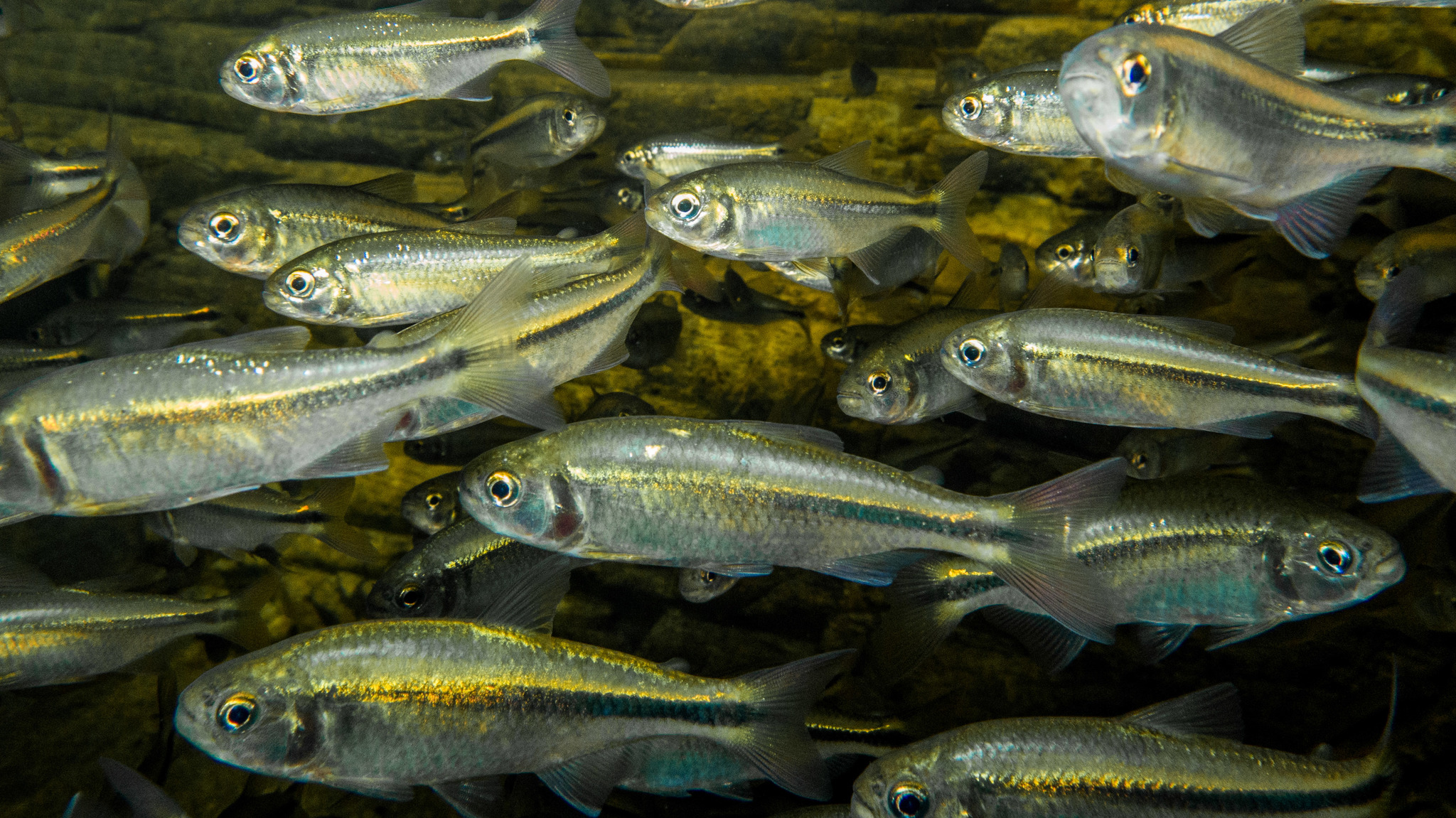
- Psalidodon paranae

Scientific classification
- Kingdom: Animalia
- Phylum: Chordata
- Class: Actinopterygii
- Division: Teleostei
- Order: Characiformes
- Family: Acestrorhamphidae
- Subfamily: Acestrorhamphinae
- Genus: Psalidodon; C. H. Eigenmann, 1911

Type species
- Psalidodon gymnodontus C. H. Eigenmann, 1911

= Psalidodon =

Genus of fishes

Psalidodon is a genus of freshwater ray-finned fishes belonging to the family Ancestrorhamphidae, the American characins. Some of these fish, like many of their relatives, are kept as aquarium pets and known collectively as tetras.

They are all endemic to freshwater habitats in South America, where they are locally called Mojarra or Lambari.

== Taxonomy and systematics ==
This genus was resurrected from synonymy with Astyanax in 2020.

== Species ==
These are the recognized species in this genus:

- Psalidodon alleni (C. H. Eigenmann & McAtee, 1907)
- Psalidodon anisitsi (C. H. Eigenmann, 1907)
- Psalidodon argentum (Salgado, 2021)
- Psalidodon balbus (Myers, 1927)
- Psalidodon bifasciatus (Garavello & Sampaio, 2010)
- Psalidodon biotae (Castro & Vari, 2004)
- Psalidodon bockmanni (Vari & Castro, 2007)
- Psalidodon brachypterygium (Bertaco & Malabarba, 2001)
- Psalidodon chico (Casciotta & Almirón, 2004)
- Psalidodon correntinus (Holmberg, 1891)
- Psalidodon cremnobates (Bertaco & Malabarba, 2001)
- Psalidodon crenuchoides (Zarske & Géry, 1999)
- Psalidodon dissensus (Lucena & Thofehrn, 2013)
- Psalidodon dissimilis (Garavello & Sampaio, 2010)
- Psalidodon eigenmanniorum (Cope, 1894)
- Psalidodon endy (Mirande, Aguilera & Azpelicueta, 2006)
- Psalidodon erythropterus (Holmberg, 1891)
- Psalidodon fasciatus (Cuvier, 1819)
- Psalidodon goyanensis (P. Miranda-Ribeiro, 1944)
- Psalidodon gymnodontus C. H. Eigenmann, 1911
- Psalidodon gymnogenys (C. H. Eigenmann, 1911)
- Psalidodon hamatus (Bertaco & Malabarba, 2005)
- Psalidodon henseli (de Melo & Buckup, 2006)
- Psalidodon hermosus (Miquelarena, Protogino & H. L. López, 2005)
- Psalidodon ita (Almirón, Azpelicueta & Casciotta, 2002)
- Psalidodon jequitinhonhae (Steindachner, 1877)
- Psalidodon kalunga (Bertaco & Carvalho, 2010)
- Psalidodon langeanii (F. C. T. Lima & Moreira, 2003)
- Psalidodon laticeps (Cope, 1894)
- Psalidodon leonidas (Azpelicueta, Casciotta & Almirón, 2002)
- Psalidodon marionae (C. H. Eigenmann, 1911)
- Psalidodon minor (Garavello & Sampaio, 2010)
- Psalidodon ojiara (Azpelicueta & Garcia, 2000)
- Psalidodon pampa (Casciotta, Almirón & Azpelicueta, 2005)
- Psalidodon parahybae (C. H. Eigenmann, 1908)
- Psalidodon paranae (C. H. Eigenmann, 1914)
- Psalidodon pellegrini (C. H. Eigenmann, 1907)
- Psalidodon pessalii Teixeira, Salvador, Mirande & F. C. T. Lima, 2025
- Psalidodon powelli (Terán, Butí & Mirande, 2017)
- Psalidodon puka (Mirande, Aguilera & Azpelicueta, 2007)
- Psalidodon pynandi (Casciotta, Almirón, Bechara, Roux & Ruíz Díaz, 2003)
- Psalidodon rioparanaibanus Alves, I. H. R. Oliveira, Pasa & Kavalco, 2020
- Psalidodon rivularis (Lütken, 1875)
- Psalidodon rutilus (Jenyns, 1842)
- Psalidodon saguazu (Casciotta, Almirón & Azpelicueta, 2003)
- Psalidodon scabripinnis (Jenyns, 1842)
- Psalidodon schubarti (Britski, 1964)
- Psalidodon serratus (Garavello & Sampaio, 2010)
- Psalidodon togoi (Miquelarena & H. L. López, 2006)
- Psalidodon troya (Azpelicueta, Casciotta & Almirón, 2002)
- Psalidodon tumbayaensis (Miquelarena & Menni, 2005)
- Psalidodon uaiso (Carvalho & Langeani, 2013)
- Psalidodon uberaba Serra & Langeani, 2015
- Psalidodon varzeae (Abilhoa & Duboc, 2007)
- Psalidodon vermilion (Zanata & Camelier, 2009)
- Psalidodon xavante (Garutti & Venere, 2009)
- Psalidodon xiru (Lucena, J. B. Castro & Bertaco, 2013)
