= Psalidodon xiru =

Conservation status
- Least Concern (IUCN 3.1)

Scientific classification
- Kingdom: Animalia
- Phylum: Chordata
- Class: Actinopterygii
- Order: Characiformes
- Family: Acestrorhamphidae
- Genus: Psalidodon
- Species: P. xiru

Binomial name
- Psalidodon xiru (Lucena, J. B. Castro & Bertaco, 2013)

Synonyms
- Astyanax xiru Lucena, J. B. Castro & Bertaco, 2013

Species of fish

Psalidodon xiru is a species of freshwater ray-finned fish belonging to the family Acestrorhamphidae, the American characins. This fish is endemic to the Jacuí River drainage in Brazil. It grows up to 95.7 mm (3.77 in) in length.
