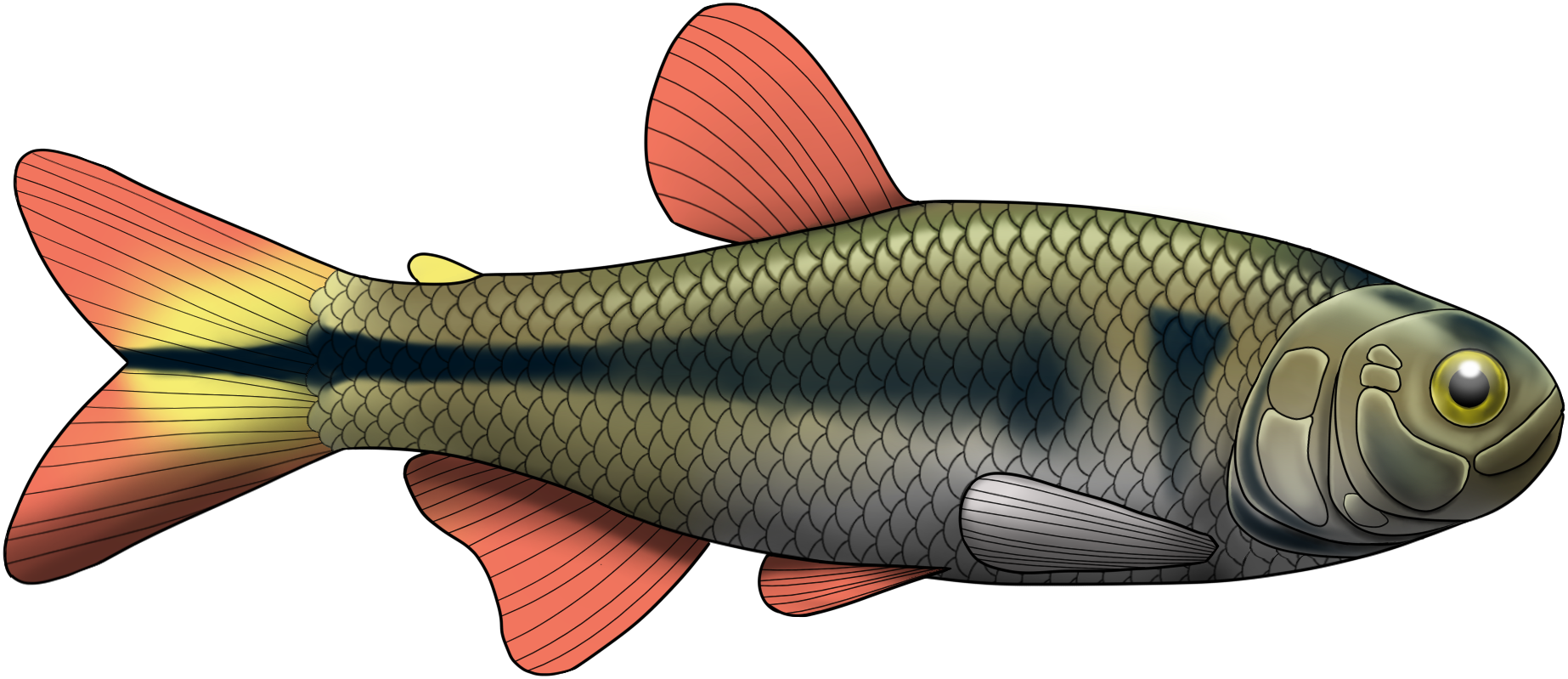
- Illustration of a female specimen

Conservation status
- Near Threatened (IUCN 3.1)

Scientific classification
- Kingdom: Animalia
- Phylum: Chordata
- Class: Actinopterygii
- Division: Teleostei
- Order: Characiformes
- Family: Acestrorhamphidae
- Genus: Psalidodon
- Species: P. brachypterygium

Binomial name
- Psalidodon brachypterygium (Bertaco & Malabarba, 2001)

Synonyms
- Astyanax brachypterygium Bertaco & Malabarba, 2001

= Psalidodon brachypterygium =

Species of fish

Psalidodon brachypterygium is a species of freshwater ray-finned fish belonging to the family Acestrorhamphidae, the American characins. This fish is endemic to a collection of high-elevation streams in Brazil. It was named in 2001 alongside congener Psalidodon cremnobates, to which it bears a strong resemblance; physical details (and a separate native range) help to differentiate between the two. Its scales are a greenish-brown on the back and silver on the belly, with reddish fins and a dark humeral spot. One of its defining features is a notably short anal-fin base, which has 13 to 15 rays.

It usually inhabits shallow waters with a good current, but little else of its ecology has been researched, including diet, behavior, and mating practices. Several species are known to live in peaceful sympatry with it. The IUCN has given P. brachypterygium a near threatened classification due to a decline in habitat quality, largely thanks to anthropogenic survival pressures.

== Taxonomy ==
Psalidodon brachypterygium was first formally described as Astyanax brachypterygiumin 2001 by the Brazilian ichthyologists Vinicius Araújo Bertaco and Luiz R. Malabarba with its type locality given as Bom Jesus in the arroio Agua Branca at 28°36'S, 50°24'W in Rio Grande do Sul, Brazil from an elevation of 1,050 m (3,440 ft). This species is now classified in the genus Psalidodon which is classified in the subfamily Acestrorhamphinae which is the nominate subfamily of the American characin family Acestrorhamphidae. Acestrorhamphidae is classified within the suborder Characoidei within the order Characiformes.

Some preliminary research suggested that P. brachypterygium be considered a junior synonym of congener Psalidodon cremnobates, which was named in the same 2001 paper.

=== Etymology ===
Psalidodon brachypterygium is classified in the genus Psalidodon, this name can be translated from the Greek psalis, meaning "shears" or "scissors", and odon, meaning "teeth", an allusion to the pincer like teeth of the type species, P. gymnodontus. The specific name originates in Greek. "Brachys" means short, and "pterygion" means fin; this is in reference to the short anal-fin base.

In Brazil, P. brachypterygium is sometimes referred to as lambari-de-cabeceira; worldwide, it has no accepted common name.

== Description ==
Psalidodon brachypterygium reaches a maximum length of 6.4 cm (2.5 in) standard length, SL. There are 13–15 anal-fin rays, which is a much lower number than almost every other member of the genus; counts therein range from 20 to 45. There are 11 or 12 pectoral-fin rays, occasionally 10 or 13. There are 6 or 7 pelvic-fin rays, and 8–10 rays in both lobes of the caudal fin. There are 35–37 scales in the lateral line. The eye takes up roughly one-quarter of the head's length.

Psalidodon brachypterygium has a brown-green back and a silver belly. The fins are mostly tinted reddish, with the exception of the pectorals, which are clear, and the adipose, which is slightly yellowish. There is also a patch of yellow on the middle caudal-fin rays. There is a main humeral spot that demonstrates vertical elongation, and a secondary humeral spot that connects to the dark lateral stripe. This secondary spot may be diffuse, and is not always obvious upon examination. On occasion, the area just behind the primary humeral spot may be pale.

Psalidodon brachypterygium bears enough of a resemblance to congener Astyanax cremnobates that the two have been considered for synonymy by some researchers. Several morphometric differences exist, however. P. cremnobates has a larger eye diameter, more anal-fin rays, and a thinner caudal peduncle in comparison to P. brachypterygium; further, the native ranges are different. P. cremnobates is also ~3 cm (~1 in) longer than P. brachypterygium.

Another species, Psalidodon pampa, bears further similarities to P. brachypterygium, but can be told apart by its much longer anal-fin base in comparison.

=== Sexual dimorphism ===
Male specimens of P. brachypterygium have bony hooks on the rays of the anal and pelvic fins. Males also have longer pelvic fins than females. The anal fin is smoothly concave in female specimens, while it is straight in males. Females are also generally longer than males, by slightly less than a centimeter.

== Distribution and ecology ==
Psalidodon brachypterygium is endemic to headwater streams of the upper Uruguay and Jacuí River basins in Brazil. This distribution is considered relatively restricted, which is not uncommon for species in the P. scabripinnis complex. Amongst sites with specific occurrence records, it is relatively more common in the Lajeadinho stream, and slightly less so in the Marco river.

Psalidodon brachypterygium was originally collected at an elevation of 1,050 m (3,440 ft), but it can be collected as far as 1,100 to 1,200 m (3,600 to 3,900 ft) above sea level. In these locales, biodiversity is low, which makes for fewer sympatric species; however, those collected alongside it include Pareiorhaphis hystrix, Rhamdia quelen, and Jenynsia eirmostigma. It generally prefers shallow streams with a healthy flow. Dietary needs are unknown.

The Lajeadinho stream floods on a regular basis, and is surrounded by floodplains as a result. Unsurprisingly, the locale is subject to significant rainfall, though not on a constant basis. The Marco river is a waterway with a strong current and rocky substrate, as well as a sparse riparian zone.

== Conservation status ==
Psalidodon brachypterygium has been evaluated by the IUCN as a near threatened species. Recently, there has been a notable decline in the quality of its habitat, attributable to several anthropogenic factors; these include destruction of the riparian zones, introduction of invasive species, and the construction of hydroelectric dams.
