= Huracán Valencia CF =

Spanish football club

Huracán Valencia
- Full name: Huracán Valencia Club de Fútbol
- Nickname(s): Rojiblanca (Red Whites); Los Huracanes (Hurricanes)
- Founded: 2011
- Dissolved: 2016
- Ground: Estadio San Gregorio; Torrent, Valencia, Spain
- Capacity: 3,000
- Chairman: Carlos Sanchís
- Website: http://www.huracancf.com/
Home colours	Away colours

Huracán Valencia Club de Fútbol was a Spanish football team based in Torrent, in the Valencian Community. Founded in 2011, it played in Segunda División B until 2016, when it was dissolved.

== History ==
Huracán Valencia Club de Fútbol was founded in June 2011. A few days later, the club bought Torrellano Illice CF's place in Tercera División. Subsequently, on 18 July, it purchased a vacant place in Segunda División B, moving up another category without having played one single match.

In 2014, after playing three seasons in the Polideportivo Municipal of Manises, the club moved to Torrent and played its games in the Estadio San Gregorio.

On 30 December 2015, Huracán Valencia was expelled from the competition due to debts with referees. The following month, the club officially folded.

After the club's dissolution, a fusion with FBM Moncada CF followed and a new team was formed, called CF Huracán Moncada and based in Moncada.

== Season to season ==
Season	Tier	Division	Place	Copa del Rey
2011–12	3	2ª B	3rd	
2012–13	3	2ª B	2nd	Third round
2013–14	3	2ª B	9th	First round
2014–15	3	2ª B	2nd	
2015–16	3	2ª B	DQ	Third round

- 5 seasons in Segunda División B

== Managers ==
- (Spain) Óscar Fernández (2011)
- (Spain) Nico Estévez (2011–2013)
- (Spain) Iñaki Alonso (2013–2014)
- (Spain) Émerson Esteve (2014)
- (Spain) Toni Seligrat (2014–2015)
- (Spain) Raúl Garrido (2015–2016)
