= Villa-Lobos =

Villa-Lobos is a surname. Notable people with the surname include:

- Dado Villa-Lobos (born 1965), Belgian-born Brazilian musician
- Heitor Villa-Lobos (1887–1959), Brazilian composer, conductor, cellist, and classical guitarist
  - Villa-Lobos Museum, a museum dedicated to exhibiting artifacts related to the composer Heitor Villa-Lobos
  - Villa-Lobos: A Life of Passion, a movie about the composer Heitor Villa-Lobos
  - Villa-Lobos State Park, a park in São Paulo, Brazil, named after the composer Heitor Villa-Lobos
  - Teatro Villa-Lobos, a theater located in Rio de Janeiro, Brazil, named after the composer Heitor Villa-Lobos
  - Quinteto Villa-Lobos, a Brazilian wind quintet that was founded in 1962, featuring the diverse compositions of Heitor Villa-Lobos
- Juan Sanchez Villa-Lobos Ramirez, a fictional character in the Highlander franchise

== See also ==
- Lobos (surname)
