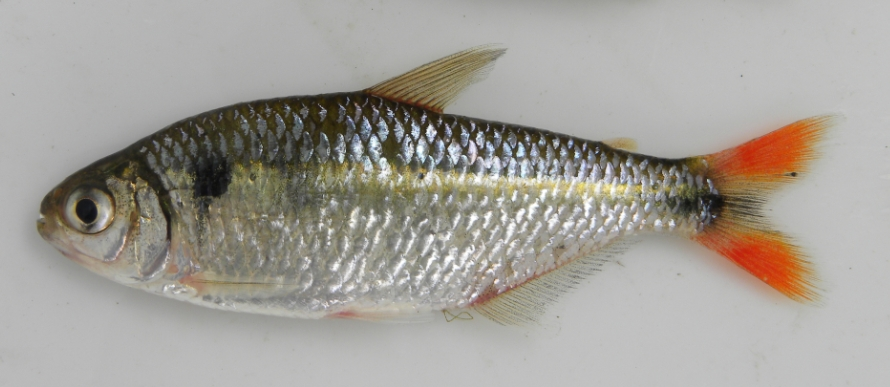

Conservation status
- Least Concern (IUCN 3.1)

Scientific classification
- Kingdom: Animalia
- Phylum: Chordata
- Class: Actinopterygii
- Order: Characiformes
- Family: Acestrorhamphidae
- Genus: Psalidodon
- Species: P. togoi

Binomial name
- Psalidodon togoi (Miquelarena & López, 2006)

Synonyms
- Hyphessobrycon togoi Miquelarena & López, 2006

= Psalidodon togoi =

Fish species

Psalidodon togoi is a species of freshwater ray-finned fish belonging to the family Acestrorhamphidae, the American characins. This fish is found in tributaries of the Río de la Plata and the Salado River in Argentina. It lives in ponds, marshes and streams.

== Description ==
Psalidodon togoi grows up to a length of 6.8 centimetres (2.7 in). The female is slightly larger than the male. The basic body color is silver to shiny green, with a horizontal green stripe from head to caudal fin. It differs from similar tetras in having a black humeral spot. In contrast to Psalidodon langeanii, it has a second, smaller humeral spot more right.

== Habitat ==
The species inhabits extensive, plant-rich water-bodies. Compared with other species, it is not very common. It has also been found in the lagoons of Chascomús and Lobos Partidos, as well as in the Matanza River, a highly polluted stream.
