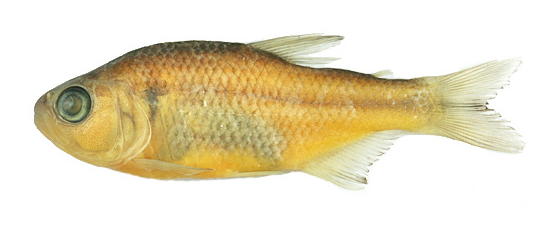

Conservation status
- Least Concern (IUCN 3.1)

Scientific classification
- Kingdom: Animalia
- Phylum: Chordata
- Class: Actinopterygii
- Order: Characiformes
- Family: Acestrorhamphidae
- Genus: Psalidodon
- Species: P. balbus

Binomial name
- Psalidodon balbus (Myers, 1927)

Synonyms
- Hyphessobrycon balbus Myers, 1927

= Psalidodon balbus =

Species of fish

Psalidodon balbus is a species of freshwater ray-finned fish belonging to the family Acestrorhamphidae, the American characins. This fish is found in the upper Paraná River basin in South America.

== Etymology ==
balbus is a Latin word meaning "stuttering", referring to its incomplete lateral line.

== Description ==
Psalidodon balbus is silvery gold in color. It can reach lengths of five to six centimetres (2.0 to 2.4 in).
