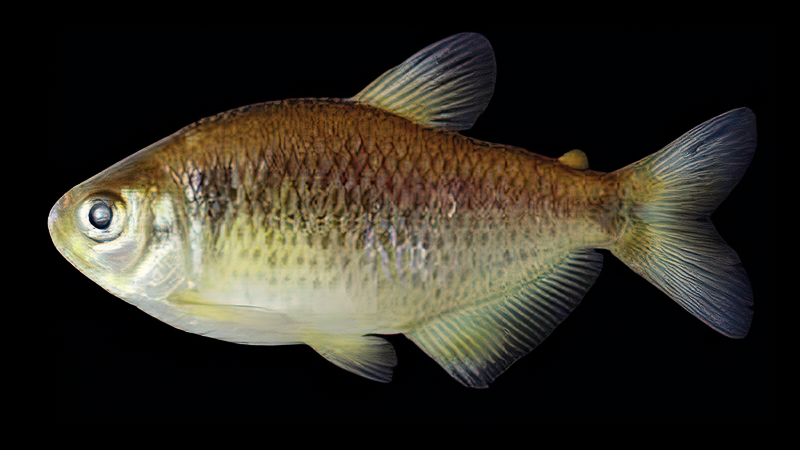

Conservation status
- Data Deficient (IUCN 3.1)

Scientific classification
- Kingdom: Animalia
- Phylum: Chordata
- Class: Actinopterygii
- Order: Characiformes
- Family: Acestrorhamphidae
- Genus: Psalidodon
- Species: P. biotae

Binomial name
- Psalidodon biotae (Castro & Vari, 2004)

Synonyms
- Astyanax biotae Castro & Vari, 2004

= Psalidodon biotae =

Species of fish

Psalidodon biotae is a species of freshwater ray-finned fish belonging to the family Acestrorhamphidae, the American characins. This fish is found in various localities in Brazil. It primarily eats invertebrates, like copepods and aquatic fly larvae, and its diet also includes seeds, fruits, and filamentous algae. Its scales are largely silver, with a touch of yellow-brown on the back and a hint of blue on the sides. Like many species of Astyanax, it has a humeral spot, which is a blotch of pigmentation in the area above or around the pectoral fin.

Though it is not studied well enough to have an official worldwide conservation status, researchers suggest a ranking of least concern for P. biotae, given a recently expanded native region and presence in several protected areas. Its original range was solely within the Brazilian state of Paraná; a 2018 study broadened this into São Paulo and Mato Grosso do Sul. It is not currently at risk of extinction, but P. biotae faces habitat loss, largely due to agricultural factors like destruction of the riparian zone and pollution from pesticides.

== Taxonomy ==
Psalidodon biotae was first described in 2004 by Brazilian ichthyologists Ricardo M. C. Castro and Richard P. Vari. Since then, A. biotae has not undergone the same rigorous taxonomic evaluation that some congeners have. Astyanax bimaculatus, for example, has had as many as 14 names; P. biotae has only ever had one. Though there are various species complexes recognized within the Astyanax genus, P. biotae is not currently assigned to any of them.

Genetically, P. biotae is thought to be affiliated with congeners in a group that includes Psalidodon dissimlis, Psalidodon minor, and Psalidodon scabripinnis.

=== Etymology ===
The specific name biotae is in reference to Biota, the Virtual Biodiversity Institute Program, for its leadership in research, conservation, cataloging, and sustainable use of resources relating to biodiversity in Brazil.

Psalidodon biotae has no common name.

== Description ==
Psalidodon biotae is a small fish, reaching a maximum of 5.2 cm (2.0 in) standard length (SL). There are 32–35 pored lateral-line scales, and the lateral line is complete. There are 11 dorsal-fin rays, 12 or 13 pectoral-fin rays, 7 or 8 pelvic-fin rays, 27–30 anal-fin rays, and 19 caudal-fin rays. The length of the body is roughly 2.5 to 3 times the depth; the body shape is subrhomboidal. Sexual dimorphism is unknown.

The middle of the back is a yellowish-brown color that fades into a silvery-blue tinge on the sides; the belly is plain silver. The pelvic and pectoral fins are mostly clear with a mild yellow hue, and the dorsal and anal fins are slightly gray-blue with a dark margin. The caudal fin is also gray-blue, with slightly stronger coloration towards the ends of each lobe, and the middle caudal-fin rays are dark. Some portions of the face and head are silvery, and the eyes have green highlights. There is a single humeral spot that displays some vertical elongation, which can be used to tell it apart from several congeners that display horizontal elongation, such as members of the Astyanax bimaculatus species complex. P. biotae also has a silver lateral stripe. The scales of the flank have a dark-brown border.

When preserved in alcohol, the majority of scale coloration disappears in favor of a uniform yellow-brown. This is with the exception of an irregular dark-brown stripe down each side (silver in life), and a distinct dark spot on the caudal peduncle.

== Distribution and habitat ==
Psalidodon biotae was originally described from a stream called Agua Mole in the Rio Paranapanema basin, in the Brazilian municipality Diamante do Norte of Paraná state. At the time, it was thought to be endemic to the region, but future studies broadened its native range into the states of São Paulo and Mato Grosso do Sul.

Riparian vegetation in areas that P. biotae inhabits often includes sparse forest and pastures, with a strong presence of pteridophytes (like ferns and horsetails) and grasses.

== Diet and ecology ==
Psalidodon biotae feeds on invertebrates, aquatic detritus, seeds, and filamentous algae. Its diet also includes fallen fruit, but it appears to be largely zooplanktivorous; in one study, more than 80% of the diet of examined specimens was composed of microcrustaceans, mainly from class Copepoda. Other food items include the larvae of Chironomidae (non-biting midges) and juveniles of Ephemeroptera (mayflies).

== Conservation status ==
In terms of global evaluation, the IUCN classes P. biotae as data deficient. Due to some modern doubts regarding its taxonomic validity, identified specimens are rare in some regions where sightings have been reported, and P. biotae is near impossible to evaluate as a result. In the Mato Grosso do Sul State of Brazil, specifically, A. biotae has been determined to be a species of least concern, as of 2018. However, some of its habitat does face anthropogenic pressures, largely in the form of agriculture; deforestation (damaging the riparian zone), pesticide contamination, and excess sediment deposition have been recorded in some areas. Other locales, meanwhile, are in protected regions of the state.
