= Laguna de Lobos =

- Location within Argentina
- Location: Buenos Aires Province, Argentina
- Coordinates: 35°16′55″S 59°7′2″W
- Type: lake

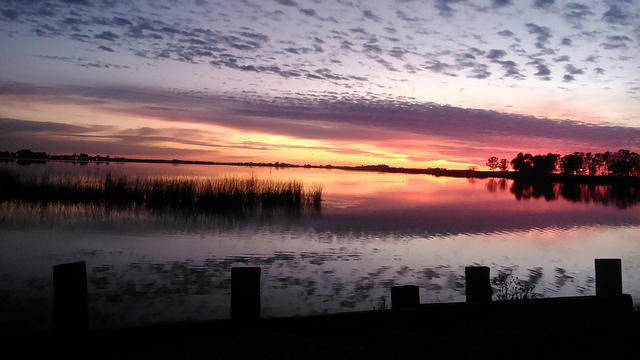
Landscape of Laguna De Lobos.

Laguna de Lobos is a lake located near Lobos, Buenos Aires Province in Argentina. In its shallow waters there are many pejerrey fish. Many tourists visit it, especially during the summer.
