= Río Negro (Uruguay) =

River in southern Brazil and central Uruguay

Coordinates: 33°24′S 58°22′W

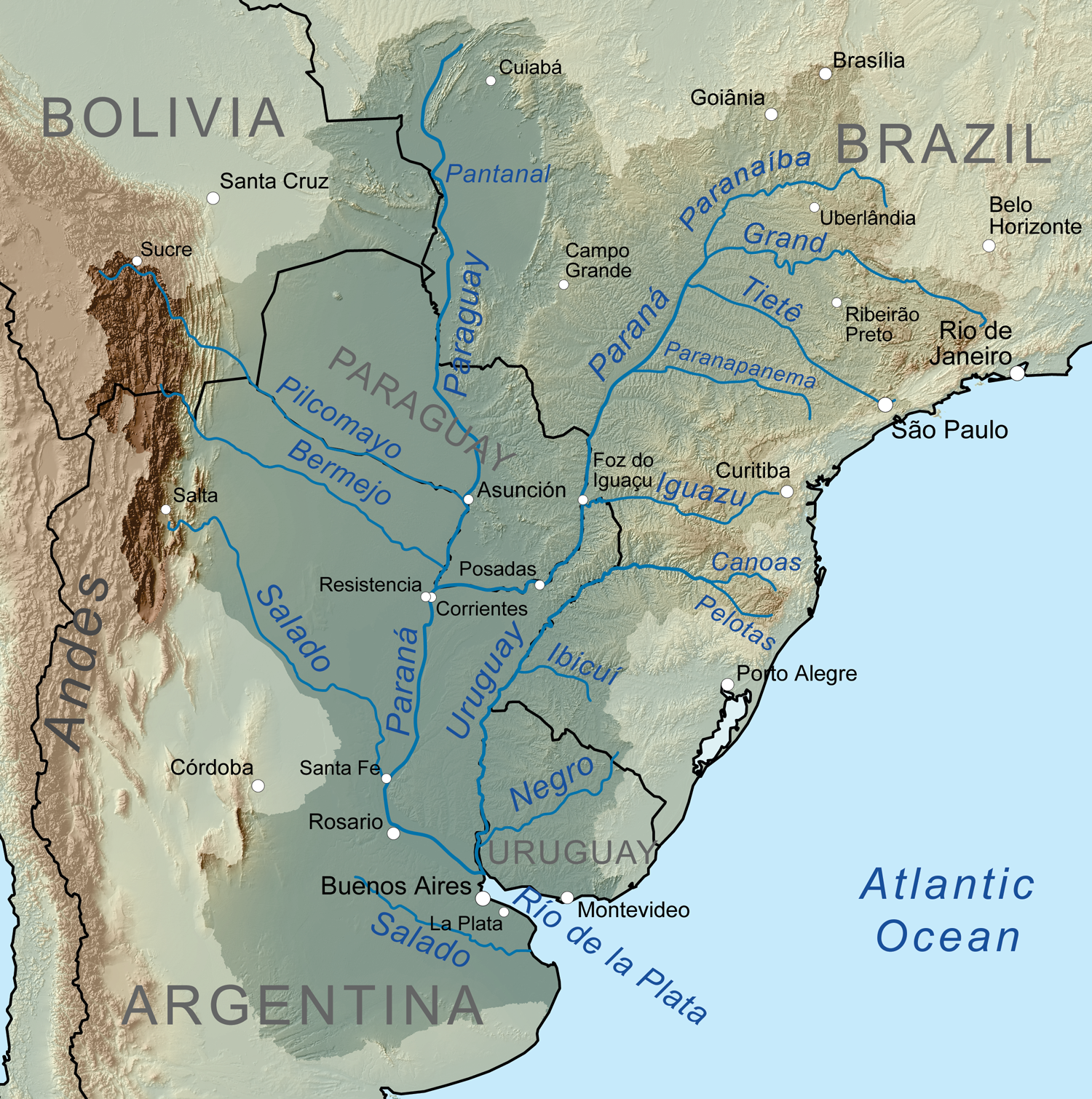
Map of the Rio de la Plata Basin, showing the Río Negro joining the Uruguay River north of Buenos Aires

The Río Negro (Spanish pronunciation: [ˈri.o ˈneɣɾo], Black River) is a river in southern Brazil and central Uruguay. It rises in the southern highlands of Brazil, just east of Bagé, and flows west across the entire width of Uruguay to the Uruguay River. The course of the Río Negro across Uruguay effectively divides the south and the north of the country. The Río Negro's principal tributaries are Yí River and Tacuarembó River.

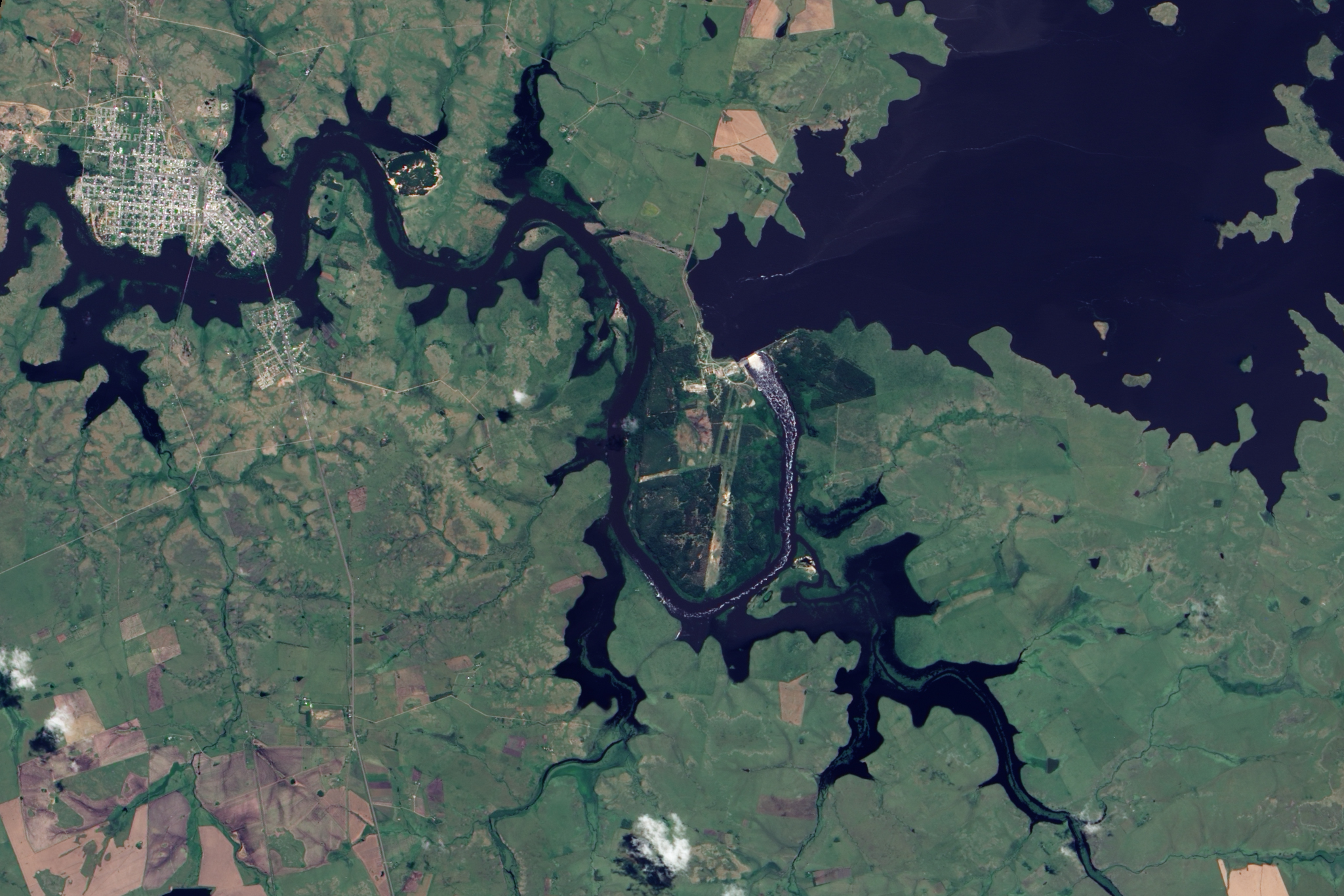
Flooding along the river

The river is dammed near Paso de los Toros, creating the Rincón del Bonete Reservoir, also called the Gabriel Terra Reservoir or the Rio Negro Reservoir. With a surface area of about 1,100 square kilometres (420 sq mi), it is the largest reservoir in Uruguay and has an installed capacity of 160 MW.

Downstream from the Rincón del Bonete Reservoir, there are two more dams, the Baygorria Dam and the Constitución Dam at Palmar, which generate hydroelectric power for Uruguay with 108 MW and 333 MW, respectively.

The Río Negro's drainage basin size is about 69,700 square kilometres (26,900 sq mi).

There is a delta at its confluence with the Uruguay River with two main mouths. Yaguarí creek, bordered by Vizcaino and Lobos Islands, is the navigable entry to Negro River, and may change water flow direction when the Uruguay is high while the southern mouth (Spanish: Boca Falsa) is very wide but shallow.

== See also ==
- Lago Rincón del Bonete
- 1959 flood in Uruguay
