= Santo Domingo de Soriano, Villa Soriano =

Chapel in Villa Soriano, Uruguay

Santo Domingo de Soriano
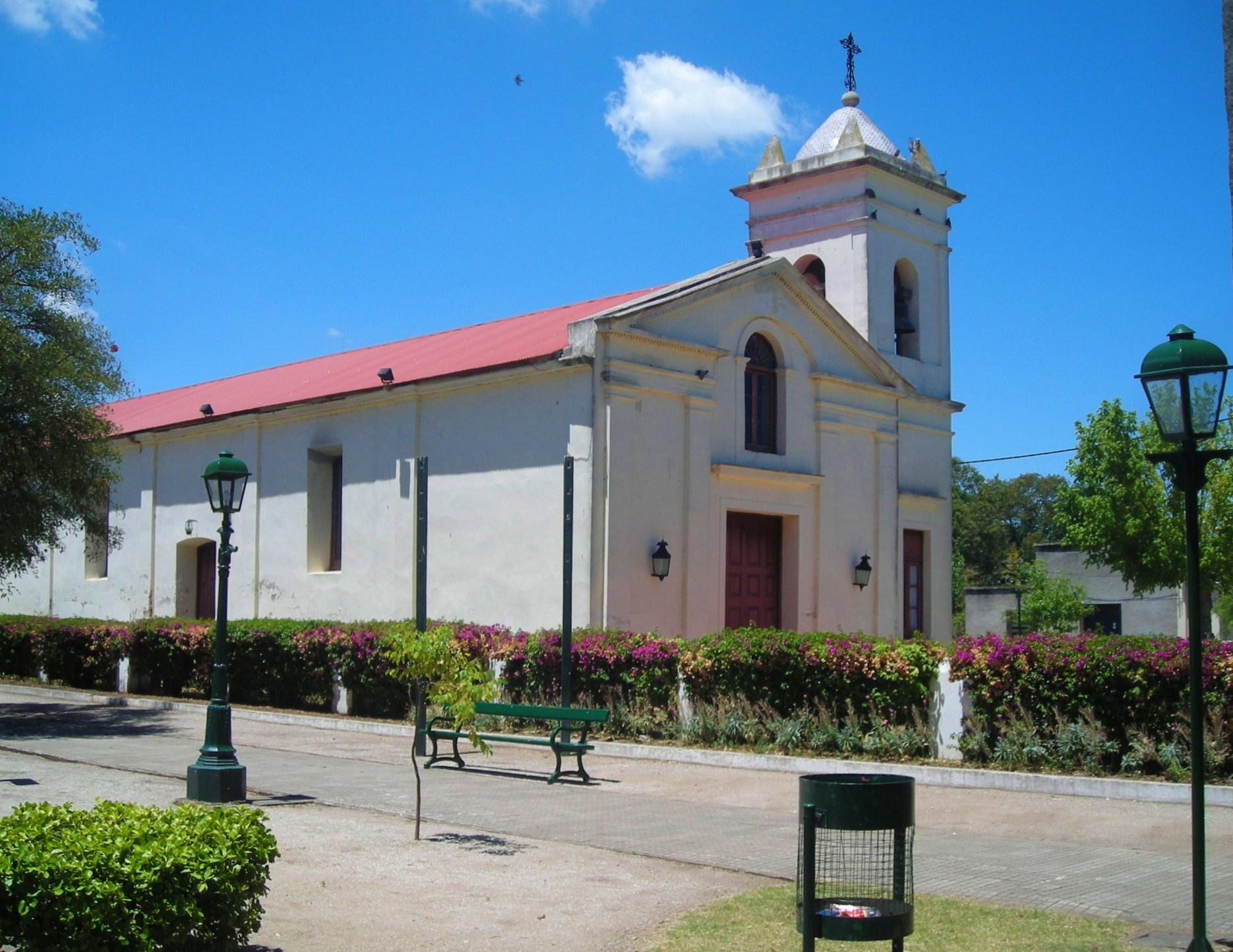

Religion
- Affiliation: Roman Catholic
- Ecclesiastical or organisational status: Chapel

Location
- Location: Villa Soriano, Uruguay
- Interactive map of Santo Domingo de Soriano

Architecture
- Type: Church

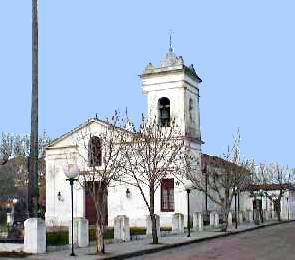

The Chapel of Saint Dominic Soriano (Spanish: Capilla de Santo Domingo de Soriano) is a Roman Catholic church building in Villa Soriano, Soriano Department, Uruguay.

== History ==
Santo Domingo Soriano was one of the oldest European settlements in the colonial Banda Oriental, dating to 1624. At that time it had a small chapel. The present building was constructed much later, but nevertheless constitutes a historic landmark. It features the only articulated image of Jesus Christ in Uruguay.

This chapel is annexed to the Parish of Dolores.
