= 1959 Uruguayan flood =

April 1959 flood in Uruguay

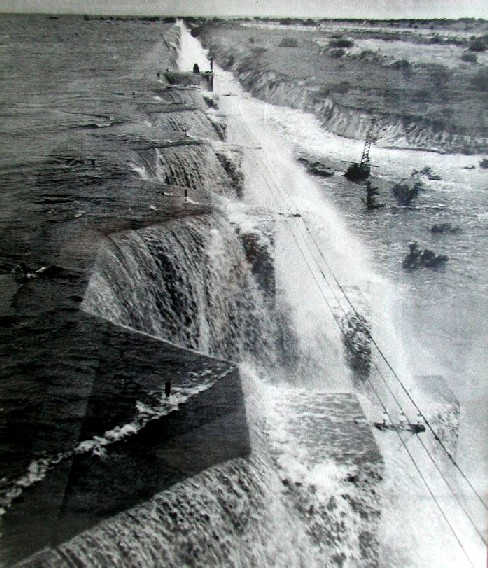
View of the Dam of Rincón del Bonete during the 1959 overtopping.

In April 1959, severe floods hit the country of Uruguay (Spanish: Inundaciones de abril de 1959 en Uruguay) that were the most severe in the modern history of the country.

Rainfall lasted from March 24 until April 23 and as a consequence, the Río Negro suffered an overtopping. Waters passed over the Dam of Rincón del Bonete.

== Sources ==
- Peirano, Ricardo (2000–2002). Gran Enciclopedia del Uruguay. Barcelona: Sol 90. OCLC 51576630.
