= Villa Soriano =

Villa Soriano Santo Domingo de Soriano
- Town
- Location in Uruguay
- Coordinates: 33°24′0″S 58°19′12″W
- Country: Uruguay
- Department: Soriano Department

Population (2011)
  - Total: 1,124
- Time zone: UTC -3
- Postal code: 75005
- Dial plan: +598 453 (+5 digits)

Villa Soriano is a town in the Soriano Department of Uruguay. Historically, it was also known as Santo Domingo de Soriano. It had acquired the status of "Villa" (town) before the Independence of Uruguay.

== Geography ==
It is located on the northwest end of Route 96, on the south bank of the river Río Negro, 10 kilometres (6.2 mi) before it discharges into Río Uruguay.

== History ==
In 1624, a Franciscan Mission established a village for the indigenous tribes of the area named Santo Domingo de Soriano. It constituted the first permanent European settlement on Uruguayan soil, predating the foundation of Colonia del Sacramento by more than fifty years. It was moved to its current location in 1708. The construction of its church began in 1751.

The town has strong associations with General José Gervasio Artigas, who is honoured by Uruguayans as the 19th century liberator of the country.

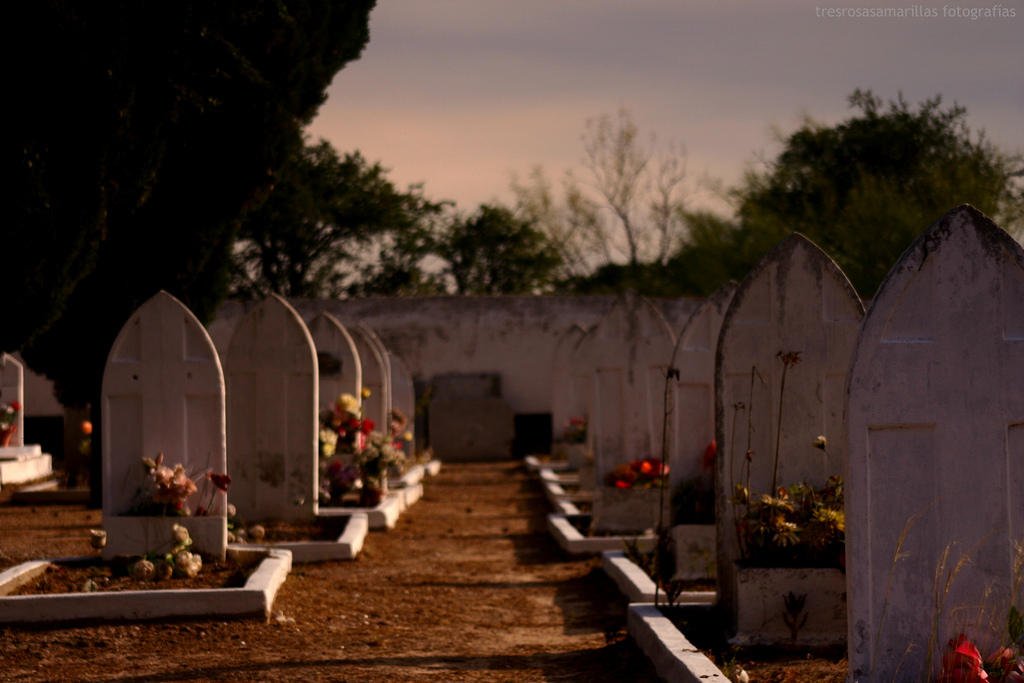
Cemetery in Villa Soriano

== Population ==
In 2011, Villa Soriano had a population of 1,124.

Year	Population
1908	6,303
1963	1,036
1975	1,120
1985	1,068
1996	1,074
2004	1,184
2011	1,124

== Places of worship ==
- St. Dominic Soriano Chapel (Roman Catholic)

== See also ==
- Soriano Department
- History of Uruguay
