= Lobos (surname) =

Lobos is a Spanish surname. Notable people with the surname include:

- Carlos Lobos, several people
- Eduardo Lobos (born 1981), Chilean footballer
- Franco Lobos (born 1999), Chilean footballer
- Frank Lobos (born 1976), Chilean former football player
- Franklin Lobos (born 1957), Chilean footballer
- Lucas Lobos (born 1981), Argentine footballer
- Macarena Lobos (born 1971), Chilean politician
- Themo Lobos (1928–2012), Chilean comic book writer
- Rodolfo Lobos Zamora (1936–1997), Guatemalan general and diplomat

== See also ==
- Lobos (disambiguation)
