= Raúl Garrido =

Spanish footballer and manager

Personal information
- Full name: Raúl Garrido Fernández
- Date of birth: 20 October 1972 (age 54)
- Place of birth: Valencia, Spain
- Height: 1.79 m (5 ft 10 in)
- Position: Midfielder

Senior career*
Years	Team	Apps	(Gls)
1995–1996	Valencia B	32	(5)
1996–1997	Andorra	35	(7)
1997–1999	Murcia	74	(5)
1999–2000	Gimnàstic	34	(3)
2000–2002	Lleida	65	(1)
2002–2006	Benidorm		
2006–2009	Ibiza-Eivissa		

Managerial career
- 2009–2010: Villarreal B (assistant)
- 2010–2012: Villarreal (assistant)
- 2012–2015: Huracán (youth)
- 2015: Huracán
- 2016: Olímpic
- 2016: Eldense
- 2017–2021: Olot
- 2021–2022: Ibiza Islas Pitiusas
- * Club domestic league appearances and goals

Raúl Garrido Fernández (born 20 October 1972) is a Spanish retired footballer who played as a midfielder, and a current manager.
