= 277 Elvira =

Main-belt asteroid

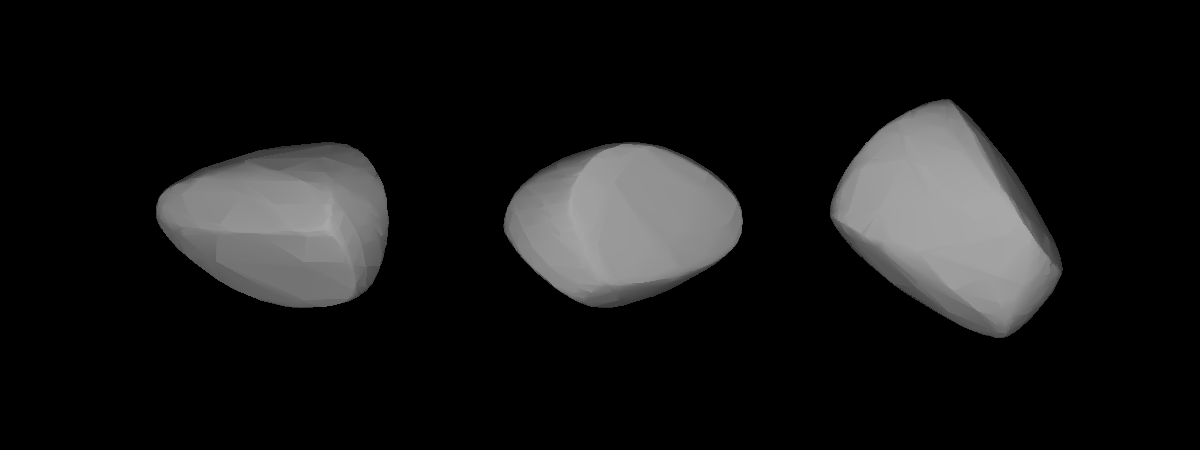
- A three-dimensional model of 277 Elvira based on its lightcurve

Discovery
- Discovered by: Auguste Charlois
- Discovery date: 3 May 1888

Designations
- Alternative designations: A888 JA
- Minor planet category: Main belt (Koronis)

Orbital characteristics
- Epoch 31 July 2016 (JD 2457600.5)
- Uncertainty parameter 0
- Observation arc: 116.65 yr (42607 d)
- Aphelion: 3.14812 AU (470.952 Gm)
- Perihelion: 2.62032 AU (391.994 Gm)
- Semi-major axis: 2.88422 AU (431.473 Gm)
- Eccentricity: 0.091498
- Orbital period (sidereal): 4.90 yr (1789.1 d)
- Mean anomaly: 266.399°
- Mean motion: 0° 12^{m} 4.378^{s} / day
- Inclination: 1.16250°
- Longitude of ascending node: 231.271°
- Argument of perihelion: 137.520°

Physical characteristics
- Dimensions: 27.19±0.9 km 27.19 km
- Synodic rotation period: 29.69 h (1.237 d)
- Geometric albedo: 0.2770±0.020; 0.277
- Absolute magnitude (H): 9.84

277 Elvira is a typical main belt asteroid and is a member of the Koronis asteroid family. It was discovered by Auguste Charlois on 3 May 1888 in Nice. 277 Elvira is possibly named for a character in Alphonse de Lamartine's Méditations poétiques (1820) and Harmonies poétiques et religieuses (1830).

A group of astronomers, including Lucy D’Escoffier Crespo da Silva and Richard P. Binzel, used observations made between 1998 through 2000 to determine the spin-vector alignment of the Koronis family of asteroids, including 277 Elvira. The collaborative work resulted in the creation of 61 new individual rotation lightcurves to augment previous published observations.

Measurements of the thermal inertia of 277 Elvira give a value of around 190 J m^{−2} K^{−1} s^{−1/2}, compared to 50 for lunar regolith and 400 for coarse sand in an atmosphere.
