= Lobos =

City in Buenos Aires Province, Argentina

- City
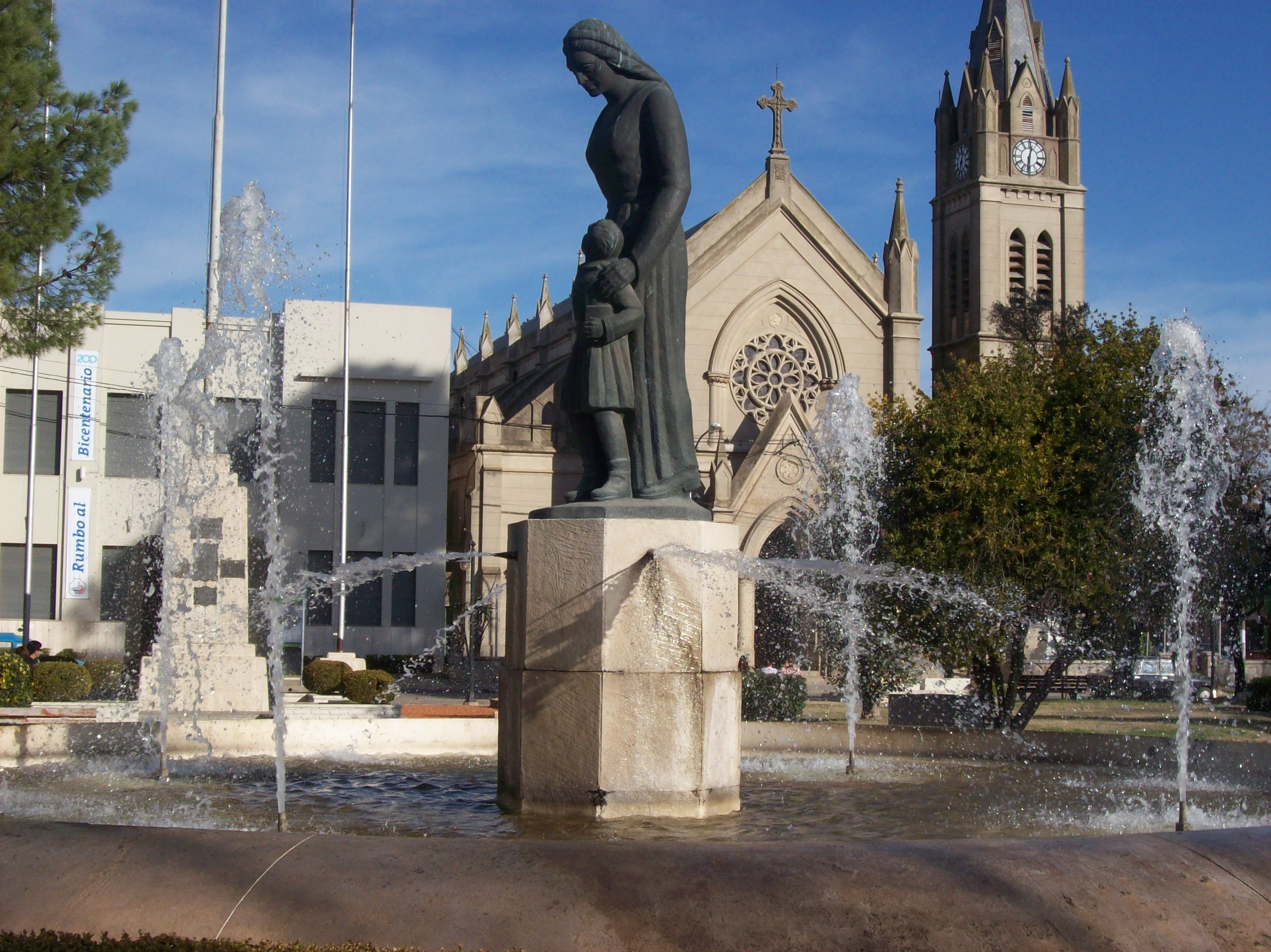

- Location in Argentina Lobos (Argentina)
- Coordinates: 35°11′S 59°05′W
- Country: Argentina
- Province: Buenos Aires
- Partido: Lobos
- Founded: 2 June 1802
- Elevation: 23 m (75 ft)

Population (2010)
  - Total: 31,190"Municipalidad de Lobos". 25 August 2,017.
- CPA Base: B 7240
- Area code: +54 2227
- Website: Official website

Lobos is the headquarters city of the Lobos Partido in Buenos Aires Province, Argentina. It was founded on 2 June 1802 by José Salgado.

== Background ==
Located 100 kilometres (62 mi) from Buenos Aires, Lobos is a fertile agricultural area known mainly because of the dairy activity and dairy-related products. Lobos Administrative Area is bordered by Navarro to the northwest; General Las Heras to the north; Cañuelas to the northeast; San Miguel del Monte to the east; Roque Pérez to the south and 25 de Mayo to the west.

The administrative area is as web divided into seven quarters: Arévalo, Carboni, Elvira, Empalme Lobos, Las Chacras, Salvador María and Zapiola.

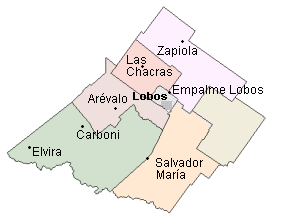
Lobos Administrative Area and its divisions

Besides the rural importance, Lobos is considered a tourist center within the Province of Buenos Aires, Lobos Lagoon being the most important feature. The lagoon is located some 15 kilometres (9.3 mi). from the city (115 kilometres (71 mi) from Buenos Aires). Other areas of special interest are the local aerodrome, several ranches, a museum of sciences of nature and history, and Perón’s museum.

As far as its history is concerned, Lobos is known for being the place of birth of three times President Juan Domingo Perón born on 8 October 1895, and it is also the place where the gaucho legend Juan Moreira was killed in 1874 after struggling with the law.

Perón’s original house was restored and turned into a museum where photographs and personal items can be viewed, amid other ancient artifacts of Lobos history.

== History ==
The history of Lobos began in 1740 when a Jesuit mission led by Reverend Father Falkner, who surveyed the centre and South of the Province of Buenos Aires and thus picked up some geographic information of the area. In 1772 thanks to Falkner's notes a map of the region was printed in London. The map contained the inscription Laguna de Lobos (Lagoon of Wolves, in Spanish) below the drawing of the lagoon.

It's said that the name Lobos stems from the amount of otters that at that time populated the lagoon and were known as "lobos de agua" ("water wolves") or "lobos de río" ("river wolves"), however, there are historians who believe Lobos had been given this name due to the wild dogs staying around and because they bore a resemblance to wolves.

By 1779 several guards settled down there and several forts, fortresses and military positions were built to form a defence wall against the natives. These positions were set up by order of viceroy Juan José de Vértiz y Salcedo and named them Chascomús, Ranchos, Monte, Lobos, Navarro, Areco and Rojas.

On 21 August 1779 Gunnery Sergeant Pedro Rodríguez concluded the construction of the main parts of the fort San Pedro de Los Lobos, over the eastern bank of the Lagoon about 300 meters from its shoreline and nearly 1,500 meters east of the mouth of Las Garzas stream, finishing the work Lieutenant Bernardo Serrano.

By the end of 18th century José Salgado and his wife Pascuala Rivas de Salgado were granted an area to colonize as a donation made by viceroy Vértiz, founding Pago de Los Lobos on 2 June 1802.

Back in that time, their Christian faith brought them to build a straw-and-mud oratory, under advocation of Nuestra Señora del Carmen, forming the Chapel in June 1803 being the first priest doctor José García Miranda. The chapel became the urban core of Lobos.

Surveyor Federico C. De Meyrelles conducted important measures, and planning in 1868, from which the city was constituted. The regime of city management started when Fructuoso Velásquez was named by the Cabildo of Buenos Aires as Mayor of the Brethrem in 1805; after the regime was modified, the first city councillor was Silvestre Cabral in 1822. after the first corporative city hall was established, with limited authority the first councillor and president of the city hall was Juan Antonio Cascallares in 1856. Finally, the first mayor of the autonomous community was Manuel Antonio Caminos Arévalo in 1877.

After the school councils were set up in 1875. the first president of the división for Lobos was presbyterian Felipe Olivera, who became parish in 1876.

The first councillor with exclusive functions was Felipe Aráoz between 1877 and 1878.

References to education in Lobos date back to the establishment of an elementary school by 1832, however, it is possible that there had already been school teachers settled in Lobos since 1826.

=== Jesuit missions ===
In 1872 a Catholic Misión arrived to Lobos and left wooden cruxes each with a brick basis as clue of its presence, located at the northern part of the city near Salgado Channel’s bank and there is another crux at the southern part of the city.

=== Nuestra Señora Del Carmen Church ===
The current church was opened in 1906 by Monsignor Terreno, bishop of La Plata and it was completed in 1912.

In the church lies the rests of the founder José Salgado, Colonel Domingo S. Arévalo, soldier of the Independence and parishes Enrique Ferroni, José Albertini and Emilio Larumbe.

The church is 49 meters long and 19 meters wide with a capacity for 2,000 people. The tower lifts 37 meters. The main altar is made up of Carrara marble and it boasts a peculiar beauty.

== Tourism ==
Lobos is mainly known by its lagoon, the aerodrome, a museum of sciences, Juan Perón's house, which has been turned into a museum, and several ranches.

== Lobos Lagoon ==
The Lobos Lagoon (or Laguna de Lobos), at 15 km from Lobos and 115 kilometres (71 mi) from the City of Buenos Aires is the main tourism attraction of the area.

It has an area of 8 square kilometres (3.1 mi^{2}) making it a favored place for fishing activities. Due to its surrounding which is rich in vegetation it is possible to host many birds.

Since December 1988, the Sport Fishing Festival is held here annually at the Lobos Fishing Club, which was founded in 1945.. Various competences were declared by City Tourism Interest, the Province and the Nation. In this contest different activities are carried out, and on conclusion, the Queen of Fishing is selected. A music show is regularly held on a stage erected over the water.

The Lagoon sports its own boats and a 150 metres (490 ft) long wharf, restaurants, grills, etc.

"Loguercio Village" is located over the northwestern margin of the lagoon and is inhabited by 400 people, but nearly 2,000 people only come to enjoy the weekend.

== Geography ==
Lobos has a surface of 1,725 km^{2} and is bordered to the south by the Río Salado, which usually becomes the source of recurrent flooding. Lobos city is also limited by Salgado Channel, which comes from Río Salado. The southeastern area of the city is bordered by Muñiz Channel.

Salgado Channel splits the city from the countryside areas. Lobos also boasts 6 lagoons: Salada; Laguna Salada Chica; Laguna Culú Culú; Laguna de Colis; Laguna Seca, and the most important of all: Lobos Lagoon (Laguna de Lobos for Spanish).

In the 1980s geologist Víctor Mansione discovered a plaster deposit beneath the lagoon. The existence of this deposit prevents the lagoon to drain. Currently the lagoon has become an issue of political concern due to its polluted water that worsened during the past years on account of the lack of sound policies to prevent this situation.

== Sports ==
The Olympics of the Salado Basin take place every year in Lobos. This event began in 1974.

== Economy ==
Lobos's economy is mostly agricultural and industrial.

In terms of agriculture, wheat, maize and soybeans are concentrated, representing the latter 60 per cent of the hectares planted. About 50% of all beekeeping in Argentina is done in Buenos Aires, of which Lobos produces a large part.
