= Lobos Partido =

Lobos Partido de Lobos
- Department

- location of in Buenos Aires Province
- Coordinates: 35°13′S 59°11′W
- Country: Argentina
- Established: October 24, 1864
- Founder: provincial law 422
- Seat: Lobos

Government
  - Intendant: Jorge Etcheverry (PRO)

Area
  - Total: 1,725 km^{2} (666 sq mi)

Population
  - Total: 33,141
  - Density: 19.21/km^{2} (49.76/sq mi)
- Demonym: lobense
- Postal Code: B7240
- IFAM: BUE073
- Area Code: 02227
- Website: lobos.gob.ar

Lobos Partido is a partido of Buenos Aires Province in Argentina.

The provincial subdivision has a population of about 33,000 inhabitants in an area of 1,725 km^{2} (666 sq mi), and its capital city is Lobos, 115 km (71 mi) from Buenos Aires.

== Attractions ==
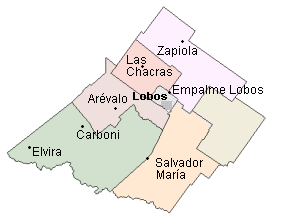

- Lobos Aeroclub
- Lobos Museum of Natural Science
- Birthplace of Juan Domingo Perón

== Districts ==
- Antonio Carboni: 25 km (15.5 mi) from Lobos
- Elvira: 38 km (23.6 mi) from Lobos
- José Santos Arévalo
- Lobos (district capital)
- Empalme Lobos
- Las Chacras
- Salvador María: 18 km (11.2 mi) from Lobos
- Zapiola: 18 km (11.2 mi) from Lobos
