= Villa Hernandarias =

Coordinates: 31°13′S 59°59′W

- Municipality and village
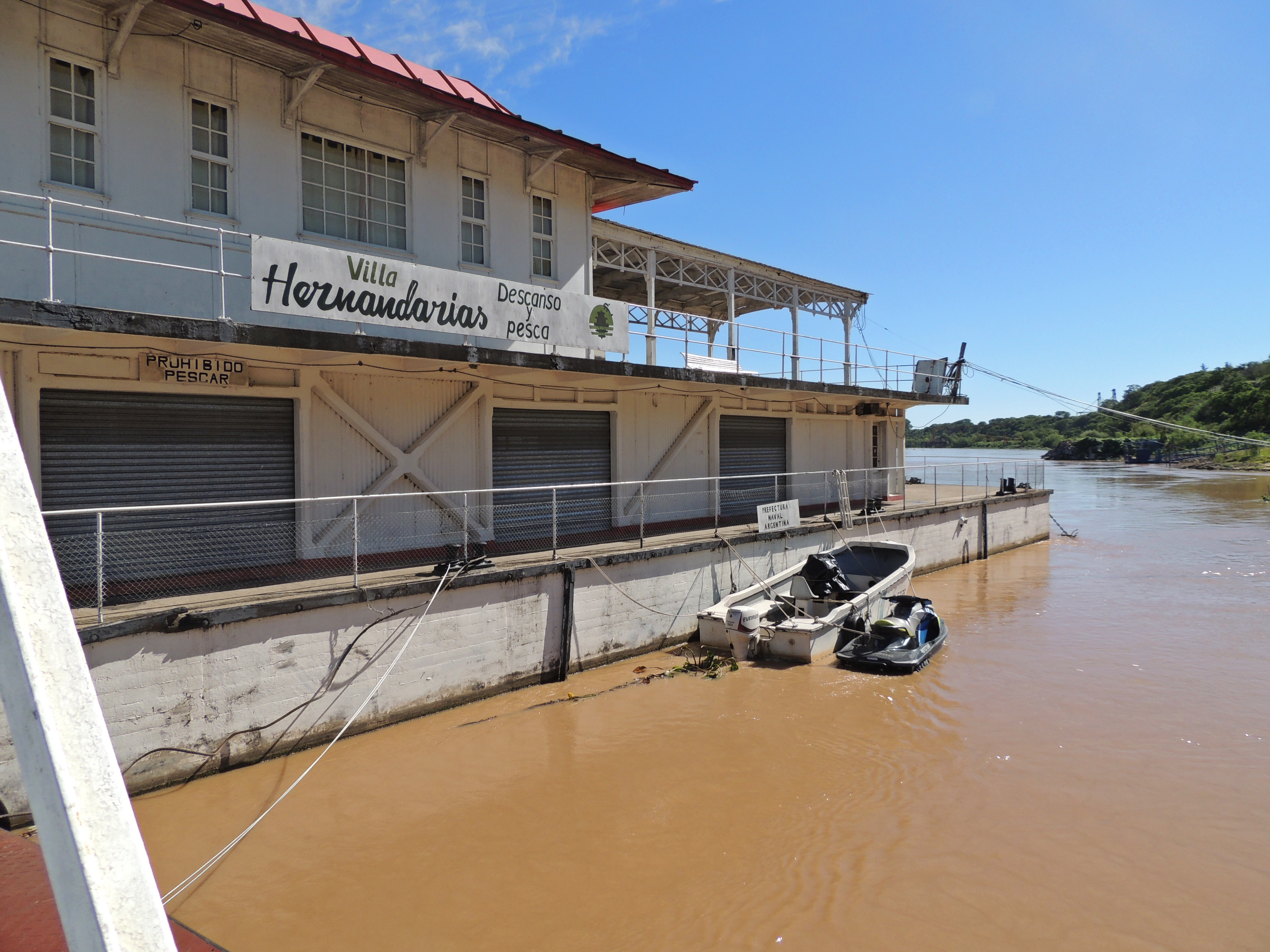

- Coat of arms
- Interactive map of Villa Hernandarias
- Country: Argentina
- Province: Entre Ríos
- Department: Paraná
- Time zone: UTC−3 (ART)

Villa Hernandarias is a village and municipality in Entre Ríos Province in north-eastern Argentina.
