= Mono (footballer) =

Spanish footballer

Personal information
- Full name: Sergio Abad Beyxer
- Date of birth: 1 March 1989 (age 37)
- Place of birth: Valencia, Spain
- Height: 1.76 m (5 ft 9 in)
- Position: Midfielder

Youth career
- 2006–2008: Levante

Senior career*
Years	Team	Apps	(Gls)
2007–2011	Levante B	132	(19)
2010	Levante	1	(0)
2011	Mirandés	0	(0)
2011	Juventud Barrio Cristo	0	(0)
2011–2012	Saguntino		
2012	Buñol		
2012–2013	Castellonense		
2013	Dénia	20	(2)
2013–2014	Eldense	10	(0)
2014	La Nucía	18	(2)
2014–2015	Dénia	32	(18)
2015–2016	Silla	?	(6)
2016–2018	Petrelense	32	(8)
2018–2019	Utiel	2	(1)
- * Club domestic league appearances and goals as of 13 January 2018

Sergio Abad Beyxer (born 1 March 1989), commonly known as Mono, is a Spanish footballer who plays as a central midfielder or winger.

== Club career ==
Mono was born in Valencia, and finished his graduation with Levante UD's youth setup. He made his senior debuts with the reserves in the 2007–08 campaign, in Segunda División B.

Mono made his first team – and La Liga – debut on 21 November 2010, coming on as a second-half substitute for Felipe Caicedo in a 3–1 home win against Racing de Santander. He would spend the rest of his spell exclusively with the B's, however.

Mono left the Granotes in June 2011, and subsequently joined CD Mirandés. In October he rescinded his link, and agreed a deal with UD Juventud Barrio del Cristo in Tercera División; in December, however, he moved to fellow league team Atlético Saguntino.

Mono left Saguntino in March 2012, immediately joining CD Buñol. On 3 January 2013, after a stint at UD Castellonense, he signed for CD Dénia.

Mono subsequently resumed his career in the lower leagues, representing CD Eldense, CF La Nucía, Dénia, Silla CF and UD Petrelense CF.
