= José Bordalás =

Spanish football manager (born 1964)

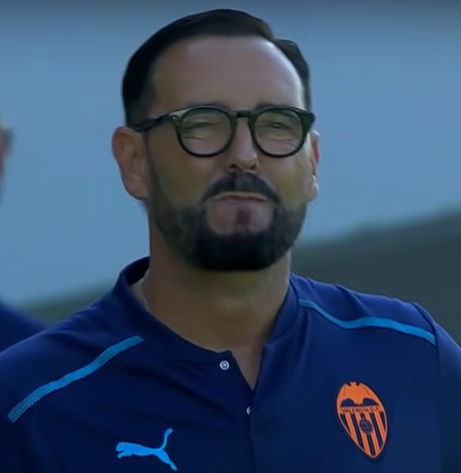
- Bordalás coaching Valencia in 2021

Personal information
- Full name: José Bordalás Jiménez
- Date of birth: 5 March 1964 (age 62)
- Place of birth: Alicante, Spain
- Height: 1.80 m (5 ft 11 in)
- Position: Striker

Team information
- Current team: Getafe (manager)

Youth career
- SCD San Blas
- 1976–1980: Hércules
- 1977–1978: → Contestano (loan)
- 1979–1980: → Español San Vicente (loan)

Senior career*
Years	Team	Apps	(Gls)
1979–1987	Hércules	0	(0)
1979–1981	→ Español San Vicente (loan)		
1981–1982	→ Orihuela Deportiva (loan)	19	(7)
1982–1983	→ Villajoyosa (loan)		
1983–1984	→ Rayo Ibense (loan)		
1984–1987	→ Benidorm (loan)		
1987–1988	Dénia		
1988	Torrevieja		
1989–1990	Petrelense		
1990–1991	Español San Vicente		
1991–1992	Altea		

Managerial career
- 1993–1994: Alicante B
- 1994–1995: Alicante
- 1995–1996: Benidorm
- 1996–1997: Eldense
- 1997–1998: Mutxavista
- 1998–2002: Alicante
- 2002–2003: Novelda
- 2004–2006: Alicante
- 2006: Hércules
- 2007–2009: Alcoyano
- 2009–2012: Elche
- 2012–2013: Alcorcón
- 2014–2015: Alcorcón
- 2015–2016: Alavés
- 2016–2021: Getafe
- 2021–2022: Valencia
- 2023–: Getafe
- * Club domestic league appearances and goals

José "Pepe" Bordalás Jiménez (born 5 March 1964) is a Spanish professional football manager and former player who played as a striker. He is currently manager of La Liga club Getafe.

His playing career ended due to injury without a first-team appearance for Hércules, and he made his professional managerial debut for the same team in Segunda División in 2006. He won promotion from that division with Alavés and Getafe in successive seasons, also leading the latter to a best-ever La Liga finish of fifth in 2019.

== Playing career ==
Bordalás was born in Alicante, Valencian Community. During his career, he never played higher than the Tercera División and the regional championships; he was under contract with Hércules CF for seven years but never appeared officially for the club, being loaned five times which included a three-season spell with neighbouring Benidorm CF.

Released in 1988, Bordalás subsequently represented CD Dénia, FC Torrevieja, UD Petrelense CF, UD Español San Vicente and UD Altea, retiring from football at only 28 due to injury.

== Coaching career ==
=== Early years ===
Bordalás worked exclusively in his region of birth for 19 years, his first job being at Alicante CF's reserves in 1993. The following year, he was appointed at the main squad.

After three years with as many teams, Bordalás returned to Alicante in 1998, taking them from the regional leagues to Segunda División B in only three seasons. His first experience in the Segunda División arrived with former club Hércules, replacing fired Juan Carlos Mandiá midway through 2005–06 and being sacked himself only seven games into the following campaign.

Bordalás returned to division three in 2007–08 with CD Alcoyano, leading the side to the first position in the next season and the subsequent failure in the promotion playoffs. In early October 2009 he terminated his contract amicably, signing with Elche CF of the second tier.

=== Alavés ===
After two spells at AD Alcorcón, Bordalás was named Deportivo Alavés manager on 11 June 2015. He led the team back to La Liga after ten years in his first season, as champions, but was still relieved of his duties on 21 June 2016.

=== Getafe ===
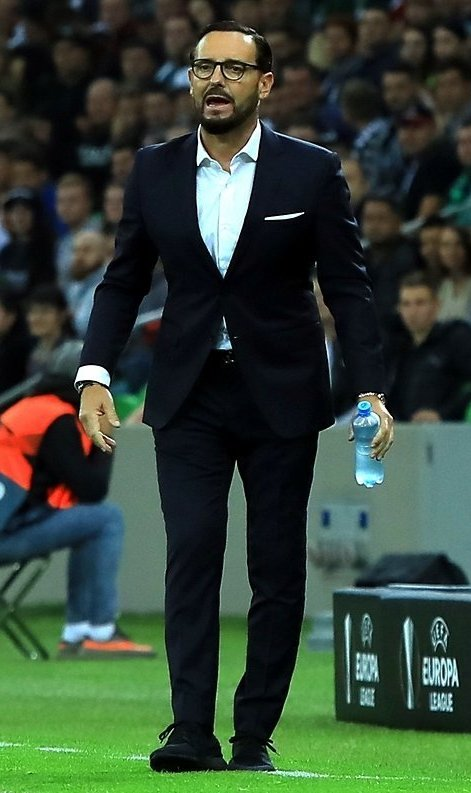
Bordalás coaching Getafe in 2019

Bordalás was hired by Getafe CF in September 2016, replacing the dismissed Juan Esnáider on a deal until the end of the campaign. He again won promotion to the top flight, this time by a 3–2 aggregate victory over CD Tenerife in the playoff final the following June. Following an eighth-place finish in his first season at that level, he led the Community of Madrid team to a best-ever fifth position and only missed qualification for the UEFA Champions League on the last matchday in May 2019; he earned the Miguel Muñoz Trophy for best coach for this feat.

=== Valencia ===
Bordalás was appointed head coach of Valencia CF in May 2021, signing a two-year contract. On his debut on 13 August, his team won 1–0 against his previous employer. In his first season, the team reached the final of the Copa del Rey, where they lost on penalties to Real Betis.

On 3 June 2022, days after the sacking of chairman Anil Murthy, Valencia's owner Peter Lim announced that manager Bordalás would also be released, with Italian Gennaro Gattuso being brought in as replacement.

=== Getafe return ===
On 29 April 2023, Bordalás returned to Getafe for the final seven games of the season, with the side in the relegation zone and having dismissed Quique Sánchez Flores. The following day, he oversaw a 1–0 loss at RCD Espanyol. After guiding them to safety, he signed a new two-year contract on 23 June.

On 10 June 2026, following a successful campaign in which the club qualified for the UEFA Conference League with a seventh-place finish, Bordalás renewed his contract for a further two years.

== Style of management ==
Bordalás is both well known and frequently criticised for anti-football techniques, including using highly defensive and aggressive tactics, often against bigger teams.

== Personal life ==
Bordalás' cousin, Juan Ignacio Martínez, was also a football coach.

== Managerial statistics ==
As of match played 22 November 2026

Managerial record by team and tenure
Team	From	To	Record								Ref
Team	From	To	G	W	D	L	GF	GA	GD	Win %	Ref
Alicante B	1 July 1993	30 June 1994	38	26	9	3	92	21	+71	68.42	
Alicante	30 June 1994	1 July 1995	38	13	13	12	53	45	+8	34.21	
Benidorm	1 July 1995	30 June 1996	42	11	13	18	35	56	−21	26.19	
Eldense	30 June 1996	19 May 1997	40	17	11	12	64	41	+23	42.50	
Mutxavista	2 June 1997	30 June 1998	26	23	2	1	102	17	+85	88.46	
Alicante	30 June 1998	1 July 2002	166	104	33	29	340	137	+203	62.65	
Novelda	23 December 2002	30 June 2003	21	6	9	6	18	21	−3	28.57	
Alicante	15 March 2004	13 February 2006	78	42	20	16	122	58	+64	53.85	
Hércules	13 February 2006	11 October 2006	27	11	5	11	24	27	−3	40.74	
Alcoyano	15 October 2007	16 July 2009	74	33	24	17	100	70	+30	44.59	
Elche	5 October 2009	8 April 2012	118	52	30	36	170	130	+40	44.07	
Alcorcón	26 June 2012	19 June 2013	46	22	7	17	63	63	+0	47.83	
Alcorcón	5 February 2014	8 June 2015	61	21	22	18	67	67	+0	34.43	
Alavés	11 June 2015	21 June 2016	44	22	12	10	51	38	+13	50.00	
Getafe	27 September 2016	26 May 2021	212	83	60	69	246	208	+38	39.15	
Valencia	27 May 2021	3 June 2022	46	17	17	12	62	58	+4	36.96	
Getafe	29 April 2023	Present	152	52	35	65	167	182	−15	34.21	
Total			1,229	555	322	352	1,776	1,239	+537	45.16	—

== Honours ==
Alavés

- Segunda División: 2015–16

Individual

- La Liga Manager of the Month: January 2025
- Segunda División Manager of the Month: May 2016
- Miguel Muñoz Trophy: 2018–19
- UEFA La Liga Coach of the Year: 2018–19

== See also ==
- List of football managers with the most matches
