= Fran Escribá =

Spanish footballer and manager (born 1965)

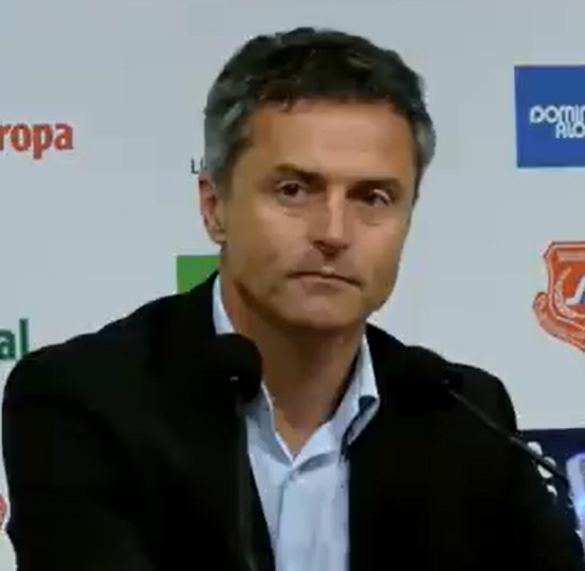
- Escribá in 2013

Personal information
- Full name: Francisco Escribá Segura
- Date of birth: 3 May 1965 (age 61)
- Place of birth: Valencia, Spain
- Position: Winger

Team information
- Current team: Valladolid (manager)

Youth career
- 1977–1984: Valencia

Senior career*
Years	Team	Apps	(Gls)
1984–1987	Mestalla		
1987–1988	Nules	37	(17)
1988–1989	Andorra	18	(1)
1989–1990	Catarroja		
1990	Torrent		
1990–1991	Eldense		
1991–1992	Sueca		
1992–1993	Villena		
1993–1994	Novelda		
1994–1995	Pinoso		

Managerial career
- 2001–2002: Buñol
- 2002–2003: Valencia (youth)
- 2004–2005: Getafe (assistant)
- 2005–2007: Valencia (assistant)
- 2008–2009: Benfica (assistant)
- 2009–2011: Atlético Madrid (assistant)
- 2012–2015: Elche
- 2015–2016: Getafe
- 2016–2017: Villarreal
- 2019: Celta
- 2021: Elche
- 2022–2023: Zaragoza
- 2024–2025: Granada
- 2026–: Valladolid
- * Club domestic league appearances and goals

Francisco "Fran" Escribá Segura (born 3 May 1965) is a Spanish football manager and former player who played as a left winger. He is the current head coach of Segunda División club Real Valladolid.

== Playing career ==
Born in Valencia, Escribá played youth football with Valencia, but never competed in higher than Segunda División B as a senior. He represented Mestalla, Nules, Andorra, Catarroja, Torrent, Eldense, Novelda, Villena and Pinoso.

In 2002, after a year in charge of Buñol, Escribá returned to Valencia, taking care of the youth sides.

== Coaching career ==
In 2004, Escribá started an association with Quique Sánchez Flores that would last several seasons, always as assistant. He started with Getafe, subsequently moving to Benfica and Atlético Madrid; the pair went their separate ways at the end of 2010–11, because the former wanted to have a go at head coaching.

Escribá was appointed at Segunda División club Elche on 12 June 2012. In his first year he led the Valencians to La Liga after an absence of 24 years and, on 28 May 2013, renewed his contract for two more seasons.

On 26 June 2015, following Elche's administrative relegation, Escribá was named Getafe manager. On 11 April of the following year, with the team seriously threatened with relegation, he was sacked.

On 11 August 2016, Escribá replaced Marcelino García Toral at the helm of Villarreal. He led the side to the fifth position in his first season, with the subsequent qualification for the UEFA Europa League.

On 25 September 2017, in spite of many injuries to the squad, and following a 4–0 away loss against former club Getafe, Escribá was fired. He returned to work on 3 March 2019, becoming Celta de Vigo's third coach of the campaign after Miguel Cardoso's dismissal.

Escribá was relieved of his duties on 3 November 2019, with the team sitting in the relegation zone. He returned to Elche in February 2021, avoiding relegation in the last matchday at the expense of Huesca after a 2–0 home win over Athletic Bilbao.

On 21 November 2021, following a 0–3 home loss to Real Betis which saw the side move into the relegation zone, Escribá was dismissed. Eleven months later, he took over Real Zaragoza in the second division.

Escribá was sacked on 20 November 2023, after an eight-match winless run. On 23 September 2024, he was appointed at fellow second-tier Granada, being shown the door on 14 May of the following year even though the team still had a chance of achieving promotion via the playoffs, eventually falling short by four points.

On 16 February 2026, Escribá became the head coach of Real Valladolid in the same league, on a contract until June 2027; he was their third manager of the season, with the team placed 19th.

== Managerial statistics ==
As of 22 November 2026

Managerial record by team and tenure
Team	From	To	Record								Ref
Team	From	To	G	W	D	L	GF	GA	GD	Win %	Ref
Elche	12 June 2012	26 June 2015	125	44	36	45	122	152	−30	35.20	
Getafe	26 June 2015	11 April 2016	34	8	7	19	31	59	−28	23.53	
Villarreal	11 August 2016	25 September 2017	59	26	16	17	82	63	+19	44.07	
Celta	3 March 2019	3 November 2019	24	6	7	11	23	33	−10	25.00	
Elche	14 February 2021	21 November 2021	31	7	8	16	26	44	−18	22.58	
Zaragoza	7 November 2022	20 November 2023	45	14	17	14	48	45	+3	31.11	
Granada	23 September 2024	14 May 2025	36	16	9	11	55	42	+13	44.44	
Valladolid	16 February 2026	Present	32	11	7	14	42	43	−1	34.38	
Total			386	132	107	147	429	481	−52	34.20	—

== Honours ==
Elche

- Segunda División: 2012–13

Individual

- Miguel Muñoz Trophy (Segunda División): 2012–13
