= Luiche =

Spanish footballer and manager (1941–2024)

Personal information
- Full name: Luis García Martínez
- Date of birth: 20 August 1940
- Place of birth: Alicante, Spain
- Date of death: 22 July 2024 (aged 83)
- Place of death: Monòver, Spain
- Position: Right-back

Senior career*
Years	Team	Apps	(Gls)
1958–1962	Villena		
1962–1964	Monóvar		
1964–1965	Oliva		
1965–1966	Calvo Sotelo	11	(0)
1966–1967	Ibiza		
1967–1968	Eldense		
1968–1971	Villarreal		
1971–1972	Benicarló		
1972–1974	Villena		

Managerial career
- 1974–1975: Petrelense
- 1975–1977: Santa Pola
- 1977–1978: Almansa
- 1978–1979: Eldense
- 1980: Eldense
- 1980–1981: Albacete
- 1981–1982: Yeclano
- 1982–1983: Eldense
- 1984: Alcoyano
- 1985–1986: Nules
- 1986–1988: Villarreal
- 1988–1991: Castellón
- 1991: Sabadell
- 1992: Cartagena
- 1994: Castellón
- 1995–1996: Alcoyano
- 1996: Castellón
- 1998: Novelda
- * Club domestic league appearances and goals

Luis García Martínez (20 August 1940 – 22 July 2024), commonly known as Luiche, was a Spanish football manager and player who played as a right-back.

== Career ==
Born in Alicante and raised in Villena, both in the Valencian Community, Luiche's professional inputs as a player consisted of 11 Segunda División matches with CF Calvo Sotelo in the 1965–66 season. During his playing career, he also represented Villena CF (two stints), CD Monóvar, UD Oliva, SD Ibiza, CD Eldense, Villarreal CF and CD Benicarló before retiring in 1974 at the age of 32.

Immediately after retiring Luiche took up coaching, being in charge of local side UD Petrelense. After managing Santa Pola CF and AP Almansa, he first arrived in Segunda División B, in charge of a club he represented as a player, Eldense.

In 1986, after spells at Albacete Balompié, Yeclano CF, Eldense, CD Alcoyano and CF Nules, Luiche was appointed manager of Villarreal in Tercera División. After achieving promotion with the latter in his first season and narrowly missing out promotion in his second, he took over CD Castellón in the second division.

Luiche achieved promotion to La Liga with Castellón in 1989, and remained in charge of the club until April 1991; despite being replaced by Lucien Muller, the club still suffered relegation at the end of the campaign. In June 1991, he was named manager of CE Sabadell FC in the second level, but was sacked in October after only one win in six matches.

Luiche then worked at Cartagena FC before returning to Castellón in February 1994, but being unable to avoid the club's relegation from the second division. After suffering another drop at Alcoyano in 1995–96, he subsequently managed Novelda CF also in division three.

== Legacy ==
In May 2012, the city of Villena named their new stadium after Luiche.

== Death ==
Luiche died on 23 July 2024, at the age of 82.

== Honours ==
=== Manager ===
Castellón

- Segunda División: 1988–89
