= Joaquín Calderón =

Spanish footballer (born 1988)

Personal information
- Full name: Joaquín Calderón Vicente
- Date of birth: 10 October 1988 (age 38)
- Place of birth: Elche, Spain
- Height: 1.78 m (5 ft 10 in)
- Position: Winger

Youth career
- Elche

Senior career*
Years	Team	Apps	(Gls)
2005–2006	Elche B		
2006–2008	Elche	35	(1)
2008–2009	Valencia B	20	(2)
2009–2010	Sangonera	30	(2)
2010–2011	Alavés	31	(3)
2011–2012	Osasuna B	35	(3)
2012	Gimnàstic	12	(0)
2013	Cádiz	13	(0)
2013–2014	Alcoyano	25	(0)
2014–2015	Sant Andreu	25	(4)
2016	Badalona	3	(0)
2016–2017	Novelda	25	(7)
2018	Torrevieja	4	(1)
2018–2020	Jove Español	48	(3)
2020–2021	Athletic Torrellano	18	(1)
2021–2024	Crevillente	48	(3)
2024–2025	Costa City		

International career
2006	Spain U19	3	(0)
- * Club domestic league appearances and goals as of 00:23, 4 August 2023 (UTC)

Joaquín Calderón Vicente (born 10 October 1988) is a Spanish footballer who plays as a right winger.

== Club career ==
Calderón was born in Elche, Valencian Community. He all but spent his extensive career in the lower leagues.

From 2006 to 2008, Calderón played in the Segunda División with local club Elche CF after graduating from its youth system. He scored his only goal in the competition on 9 June 2007, in the last minute of a 1–0 home victory against CD Castellón.
