= José Galiana =

Spanish footballer

Personal information
- Full name: José Emilio Riquelme Galiana
- Date of birth: 17 August 1967 (age 59)
- Place of birth: El Cantón, Spain
- Position: Forward

Youth career
- 1982–1985: Kelme

Senior career*
Years	Team	Apps	(Gls)
1985–1989	Ilicitano		
1988	Elche	2	(0)
1989–1990	Imperial de Murcia		
1990–1991	Zamora		
1991–1992	Getafe	7	(0)
1993–1996	Pinoso		
1996–1997	Gramenet		
1997–1998	Alicante		
- Lorca Deportiva
- Horadada
- Ciudad Murcia
- Torrellano
?–2004	Santa Pola		

Managerial career
- 2007–2008: Orihuela B
- 2008–2009: Alone Guardamar
- 2009–2011: Novelda
- 2012: Lorca Atlético
- 2013–2014: Eldense
- 2014–2015: Torrevieja
- 2015–2016: Eldense
- 2016–2017: Sud América
- 2017: Lorca Deportiva
- 2017–2018: Alcoyano
- * Club domestic league appearances and goals

José Emilio Riquelme Galiana (born 17 August 1967) is a Spanish retired footballer who played as a forward, and is a current manager.

== Playing career ==
Born in El Cantón de Abanilla, Abanilla, Murcia, Riquelme represented Kelme CF as a youth, and subsequently moved to Elche CF. Initially assigned to the reserves, he made his first team – and La Liga – debut on 27 November 1988, coming on as a second-half substitute in a 0–1 home loss against Real Oviedo.

Galiana left the club in 1989, and subsequently resumed his career in the lower leagues, representing Imperial de Murcia CF, Zamora CF, Pinoso CF, UDA Gramenet, Alicante CF, CF Lorca Deportiva, UD Horadada, Ciudad de Murcia, Torrellano CF and Santa Pola CF. He retired with the latter at the age of 36.

== Managerial career ==
After stints with Elche's youth sides, Galiana's first club in charge was Orihuela CF's B-team in 2008. A spell with CD Alone de Guardamar followed, and on 27 October 2009, he was appointed Novelda CF manager in Tercera División.

In March 2012, Galiana was named manager of Segunda División B side Lorca Atlético CF. After suffering relegation, he remained without a club for roughly a year before taking over CD Eldense.

On 26 June 2014, Galiana was appointed at the helm of CD Torrevieja. Sacked the following March, he subsequently returned to Eldense.

On 21 October 2016, Galiana moved abroad for the first time in his career and was appointed manager of Uruguayan Primera División side Sud América, becoming the first Spanish manager to train in the country. He was relieved from his duties on 24 March of the following year, and joined CF Lorca Deportiva on 11 April.

On 10 August 2017, despite taking the club to their promotion to the third division for the first time ever, Galiana was sacked. On 19 September, he was named manager of CD Alcoyano.
