= Juan Ignacio Martínez =

Spanish footballer and manager

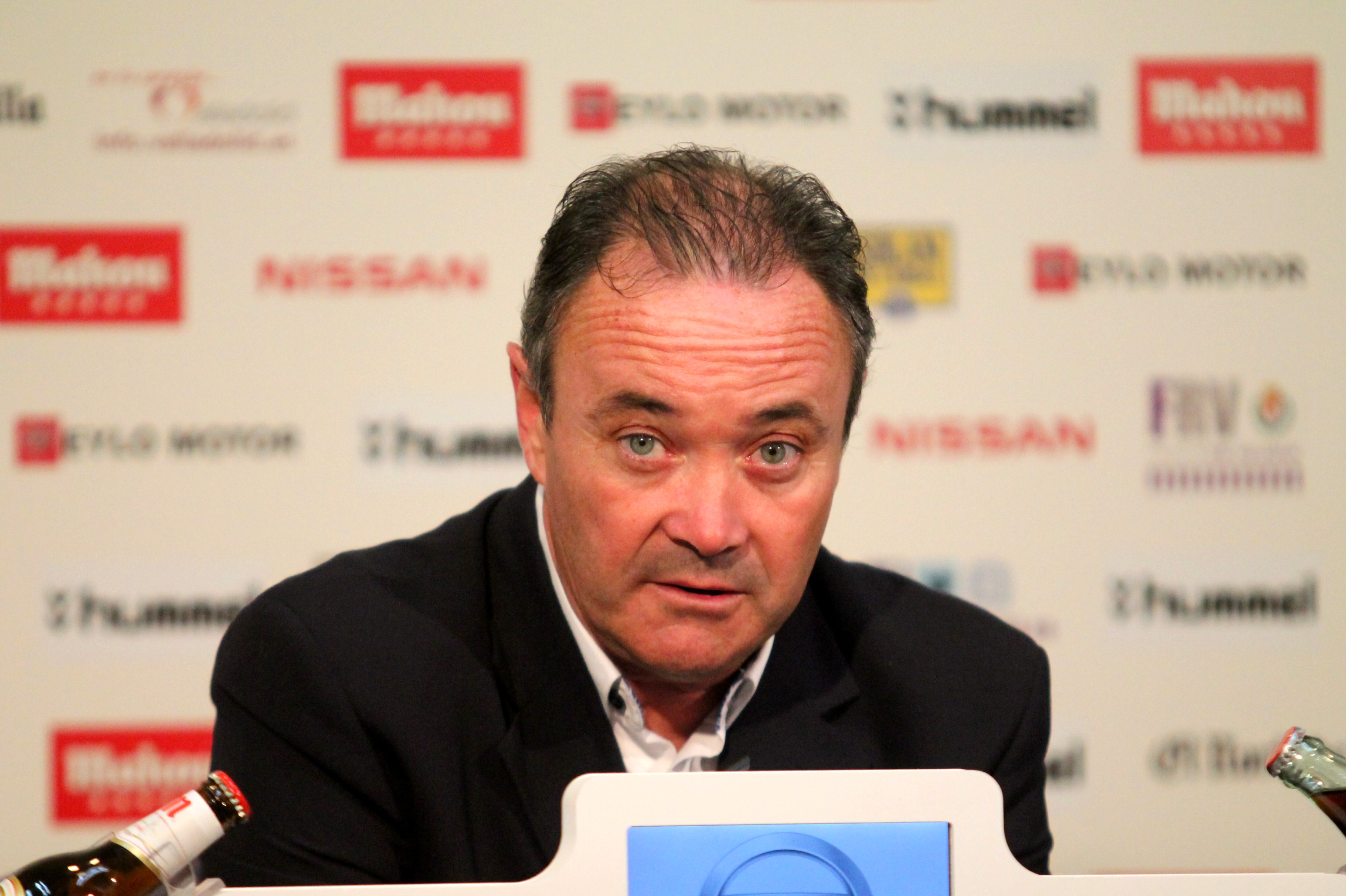
- Martínez during a press conference in 2013

Personal information
- Full name: Juan Ignacio Martínez Jiménez
- Date of birth: 23 June 1964 (age 62)
- Place of birth: Alicante, Spain
- Position: Left back

Youth career
- Alicante
- 1982–1983: Elche

Senior career*
Years	Team	Apps	(Gls)
1983–1984	Ilicitano		
1984–1985	Benicarló		
1985–1986	Melilla		
1986–1987	Alicante		
1987–1988	Vall de Uxó		
1988	Almansa		
1988–1990	Torrevieja	21	(0)

Managerial career
- 1997: Alicante
- 1997–1998: Orihuela
- 1999–2001: Torrevieja
- 2002–2005: Mar Menor-San Javier
- 2005–2006: Cartagena
- 2006–2007: Alcoyano
- 2007–2008: Salamanca
- 2008–2009: Albacete
- 2009–2011: Cartagena
- 2011–2013: Levante
- 2013–2014: Valladolid
- 2014–2015: Almería
- 2017: Shanghai Shenxin
- 2018: Meizhou Meixian Techand
- 2019: Al-Arabi
- 2020–2022: Zaragoza
- 2023–2024: Foolad
- * Club domestic league appearances and goals

Juan Ignacio Martínez Jiménez (Spanish pronunciation: [xwaniɣˈnaθjo maɾˈtineθ xiˈmeneθ]; born 23 June 1964), commonly known by his initials JIM, is a Spanish football coach and former player, who played as a left back. He last managed Foolad in the Persian Gulf Pro League.

Having only played as high as Segunda División B, he began managing at age 33 and led Levante, Valladolid and Almería in La Liga, and four clubs in the Segunda División. Abroad, he had spells in Kuwait, China and Iran.

== Playing career ==
Martínez was born in Alicante. After playing youth football for both Alicante CF and Elche CF he competed only at amateur level during his career, never in higher than the third division. He played for Elche CF Ilicitano, CD Benicarló, UD Melilla – due to his compulsory military service – Alicante, UD Vall de Uxó, UD Almansa and FC Torrevieja.

Martínez ended his career in 1990, at only 26.

== Coaching career ==
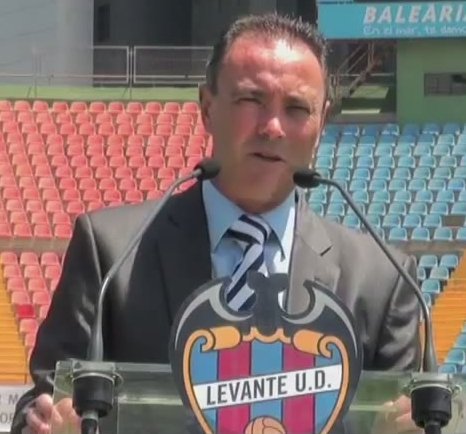
Martínez being presented by Levante

Martínez began managing in 1997, his first stop being precisely Alicante. In the following years, he coached several teams in the lower leagues – also working in youth and women's football – his longest spell being three years with AD Mar Menor-San Javier in the fourth level, which he led to two consecutive playoff appearances albeit without any promotion.

In the 2005–06 season, Martínez led FC Cartagena to the first position in division three. He first reached the professionals in the 2007–08 campaign, coaching UD Salamanca to a final seventh place in the second tier.

After another season in the second division, with Albacete Balompié, Martínez returned to Cartagena (recently returned to that level). He led the Murcian club to the fifth position in his first year, and the 13th in his second.

Affectionately known as "JIM" (his full name's initials), Martínez was appointed at Levante UD on 9 June 2011, replacing Getafe CF-bound Luis García. After two draws in the first two La Liga rounds he coached the team to seven consecutive wins, including a 1–0 home victory against Real Madrid.

Martínez also led the Valencians to their first continental competition ever, by finishing sixth in 2011–12. After ranking only 11th in the following season he opted to not renew his contract, and signed a two-year deal with fellow league side Real Valladolid.

On 24 May 2014, after the latter's relegation, Martínez was relieved of his duties. On 11 December he was appointed at the helm of UD Almería, replacing fired Francisco; on 5 April 2015, he was sacked by the Andalusians after a heavy 1–4 home loss to his previous club Levante.

After one month as working as a personal assistant to Lorca FC's new Chinese owner Xu Genbao, Martínez moved abroad in November 2016 to manage Shanghai Shenxin F.C. on an annual salary of €600,000. He left a year later, having finished seventh in China League One and reached the semi-finals of the FA Cup, where they were beaten by Super League's Shanghai Greenland Shenhua FC. He remained in the country with Meizhou Meixian Techand F.C. of the same league, being dismissed in September with the team third from bottom after 24 games.

Martínez was hired by Al-Arabi SC of the Kuwaiti Premier League in June 2019, working alongside Darko Nestorović. On 14 December 2020, he returned to his home country after being named at the helm of Real Zaragoza in the second division.

Martínez left Zaragoza on 30 May 2022, after avoiding relegation. On 6 September 2023, he signed for Foolad F.C. who had lost their first four games of the Persian Gulf Pro League season.

== Personal life ==
Martínez's cousin, José Bordalás, is also a football coach.

== Managerial statistics ==
As of 3 January 2024

Managerial record by team and tenure
Team	Nat	From	To	Record								Ref
Team	Nat	From	To	G	W	D	L	GF	GA	GD	Win %	Ref
Alicante	(Spain)	1 January 1997	1 July 1997	21	2	4	15	20	53	−33	9.52	
Orihuela	(Spain)	1 July 1997	30 June 1998	37	18	6	13	56	41	+15	48.65	
Torrevieja	(Spain)	30 June 1999	1 July 2001	66	29	18	19	123	94	+29	43.94	
Mar Menor-San Javier	(Spain)	1 July 2002	19 March 2005	119	72	29	18	281	112	+169	60.50	
Cartagena	(Spain)	19 March 2005	30 June 2006	50	25	15	10	64	42	+22	50.00	
Alcoyano	(Spain)	13 November 2006	30 June 2007	28	14	8	6	30	19	+11	50.00	
Salamanca	(Spain)	30 June 2007	7 July 2008	43	13	18	12	53	46	+7	30.23	
Albacete	(Spain)	7 July 2008	28 April 2009	35	10	11	14	37	47	−10	28.57	
Cartagena	(Spain)	2 July 2009	9 June 2011	87	35	19	33	110	119	−9	40.23	
Levante	(Spain)	9 June 2011	5 June 2013	98	38	20	40	126	132	−6	38.78	
Valladolid	(Spain)	17 June 2013	21 May 2014	40	7	16	17	39	63	−24	17.50	
Almería	(Spain)	13 December 2014	5 April 2015	17	5	4	8	15	25	−10	29.41	
Shanghai Shenxin	(China)	26 November 2016	28 November 2017	37	13	12	12	65	52	+13	35.14	—
Meizhou Meixian Techand	(China)	2 January 2018	24 September 2018	25	6	9	10	33	35	−2	24.00	—
Al-Arabi	(Kuwait)	25 June 2019	13 October 2019	6	0	3	3	5	10	−5	0.00	—
Zaragoza	(Spain)	14 December 2020	30 May 2022	71	25	27	19	69	73	−4	35.21	
Foolad	(Iran)	5 September 2023	13 February 2024	12	4	3	5	5	10	−5	33.33	
Total				792	316	222	254	1,131	973	+158	39.90	—
