= CF Borriol =

Spanish football team

Borriol
- Full name: Club de Fútbol Borriol
- Founded: 1952
- Ground: El Palmar, Borriol, Valencia, Spain
- Capacity: 1,000
- Chairman: (Spain) Sergio García
- Manager: (Spain) Raúl Tena
- League: Segona FFCV – Group 1
- 2024–25: Segona FFCV – Group 1, 7th of 16
Home colours	Away colours

Club de Fútbol Borriol is a Spanish football team based in Borriol, Province of Castellón, in the Valencian Community. Founded in 1952, it currently plays in Segona FFCV – Group 1, holding home games at Estadio El Palmar, which holds 1,000 spectators.

== History ==
Chaired by the golfer Sergio García, Borriol won their first promotion to the Tercera División in June 2010. García himself played intermittently for the team from September 2010. The side slipped back into the regional leagues for one season before a return in July 2015; they had gone unbeaten in the season but lost in the play-offs to CF Cullera, who resigned their place in Tercera.

García left his post in June 2018, after another relegation.

== Season to season ==
Season	Tier	Division	Place	Copa del Rey
1973–74	7	3ª Reg.	8th	
1974–75	DNP			
1975–76	DNP			
1976–77	DNP			
1977–78	8	3ª Reg.	4th	
1978–79	7	2ª Reg.	10th	
1979–80	7	2ª Reg.	12th	
1980–81	7	2ª Reg.	15th	
1981–82	8	3ª Reg.	2nd	
1982–83	7	2ª Reg.	8th	
1983–84	7	2ª Reg.	17th	
1984–85	7	2ª Reg.	14th	
1985–86	7	2ª Reg.	17th	
1986–87	7	2ª Reg.	19th	
1987–88	7	2ª Reg.	9th	
1988–89	7	2ª Reg.	9th	
1989–90	7	2ª Reg.	5th	
1990–91	7	2ª Reg.	1st	
1991–92	6	1ª Reg.	17th	
1992–93	7	2ª Reg.	5th	

Season	Tier	Division	Place	Copa del Rey
1993–94	7	2ª Reg.	2nd	
1994–95	6	1ª Reg.	7th	
1995–96	6	1ª Reg.	14th	
1996–97	6	1ª Reg.	10th	
1997–98	6	1ª Reg.	8th	
1998–99	6	1ª Reg.	6th	
1999–2000	6	1ª Reg.	7th	
2000–01	6	1ª Reg.	7th	
2001–02	6	1ª Reg.	2nd	
2002–03	5	Reg. Pref.	15th	
2003–04	5	Reg. Pref.	12th	
2004–05	5	Reg. Pref.	11th	
2005–06	5	Reg. Pref.	8th	
2006–07	5	Reg. Pref.	16th	
2007–08	6	1ª Reg.	2nd	
2008–09	5	Reg. Pref.	1st	
2009–10	5	Reg. Pref.	1st	
2010–11	4	3ª	5th	
2011–12	4	3ª	12th	
2012–13	4	3ª	8th	

Season	Tier	Division	Place	Copa del Rey
2013–14	4	3ª	18th	
2014–15	5	Reg. Pref.	1st	
2015–16	4	3ª	15th	
2016–17	4	3ª	15th	
2017–18	4	3ª	20th	
2018–19	5	Reg. Pref.	18th	
2019–20	6	1ª Reg.	16th	
2020–21	6	1ª Reg.	13th	
2021–22	8	2ª Reg.	7th	
2022–23	8	2ª Reg.	4th	
2023–24	9	3ª FFCV	1st	
2024–25	8	2ª FFCV	7th	
2025–26	8	2ª FFCV	16th	
2026–27	9	3ª FFCV		

- 7 seasons in Tercera División
