= Diego Ribera =

Spanish retired footballer (born 1977)

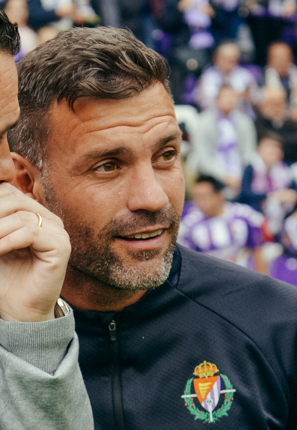
- Ribera with Valladolid in 2019

Personal information
- Full name: Diego Ribera Ramírez
- Date of birth: 19 February 1977 (age 49)
- Place of birth: Riba-Roja, Spain
- Height: 1.74 m (5 ft 9 in)
- Position: Forward

Youth career
- 1985–1990: Ribarroja
- 1990–1994: Valencia

Senior career*
| Years | Team | Apps | (Gls) |
| 1994–1996 | Valencia | 6 | (0) |
| 1994–1995 | → Hércules (loan) | 16 | (4) |
| 1995–1996 | Valencia B | 30 | (18) |
| 1996–1997 | Figueres | 39 | (23) |
| 1997–1998 | Espanyol B | 58 | (29) |
| 1998–1999 | Espanyol | 1 | (0) |
| 1999 | → Recreativo (loan) | 22 | (5) |
| 1999–2000 | Córdoba | 40 | (8) |
| 2000–2002 | Sevilla | 15 | (5) |
| 2001–2002 | → Jaén (loan) | 22 | (0) |
| 2002–2005 | Gimnàstic | 25 | (5) |
| 2003–2004 | → Girona (loan) | 33 | (12) |
| 2005 | Alicante | 21 | (5) |
| 2005–2007 | Ponferradina | 51 | (12) |
| 2007 | Orihuela | 23 | (3) |
| 2008 | Mazarrón | 16 | (3) |
| 2009–2012 | Ribarroja | ? | (11) |
| Total | | 418 | (143) |

International career
| 1993–1994 | Spain U16 | 20 | (20) |
| 1993–1995 | Spain U18 | 14 | (6) |
| 1995 | Spain U19 | 1 | (0) |
| 1997 | Spain U20 | 7 | (2) |

Managerial career
- 2014: Espanyol B (assistant)
- 2014–2015: Espanyol (assistant)
- 2018–: Valladolid (assistant)
- * Club domestic league appearances and goals

Diego Ribera Ramírez (born 19 February 1977) is a Spanish retired (in Ribarroja CF) footballer who played as a forward, and is the current assistant manager of Real Valladolid.

== Club career ==
Born in Riba-roja de Túria, Valencian Community, Ribera emerged through local Valencia CF's youth ranks. On 13 February 1994, six days shy of his 17th birthday, he made his La Liga debut, playing nearly 40 minutes in a 0–1 away loss against CD Tenerife and being one of the youngest players ever to first appear in the competition.

For the 1996–97 season, definitely released by the Che, Ribera joined UE Figueres in Segunda División B, being top scorer in Group III. Subsequently, he returned to the top division with RCD Espanyol but, as in his previous spell, spent most of the campaign with the reserves, only appearing once in that level and also being loaned, now to Recreativo de Huelva.

Ribera spent the following three seasons in Segunda División, promoting in 2001 with Sevilla FC but being relegated the following year with Real Jaén. He played mainly in division three subsequently, his last spell in the second tier being the first half of 2006–07 with SD Ponferradina (13 games, team relegation).

In February 2009, after a few months without a team, Ribera signed with his hometown club Ribarroja CF, in Tercera División.

== International career ==
Ribera was capped by Spain at youth level, winning the UEFA European Under-18 Championship in 1995 and finishing third in the previous year. Later, he represented the under-20s at the 1997 FIFA World Youth Championship in Malaysia, playing five games and scoring once for the eventual quarter-finalists.
