= CD Almoradí =

Almoradí
- Full name: Club Deportivo Almoradí
- Founded: 1923; 103 years ago
- Ground: Sadrián, Almoradí, Valencia, Spain
- Capacity: 3,000
- President: Paco Albaladejo
- Manager: Paco Martínez
- League: Lliga Comunitat – South
- 2025–26: Primera FFCV – Group 4, 2nd of 16 (promoted via play-offs)
Home colours	Away colours

Club Deportivo Almoradí is a Spanish football team based in Almoradí, in the Valencian Community. Founded in 1923, they play in Lliga Comunitat – South, holding home games at Estadio Municipal Sadrián, with a capacity of 3,000 people.

== History ==
Founded in 1923 as Almoradí Football Club, the club played matches until 1925, and tried to reorganize unsuccessfully in 1926. In late 1930, another club was founded under the sponsorship of Teatro Cortés, being named Club Deportivo Cortés, and Sociedad Deportiva Almoradí Football Club would return in 1931, again only playing friendlies.

After ceasing activities due to the Spanish Civil War, Almoradí returned to an active status in 1943, under the name of Club Deportivo Almoradí. The club reached the Tercera División in 1947, but went inactive in the following year.

After one active season in 1952–53 as Almoradí Club de Fútbol, the club would return to play in 1954, and achieved promotion to the third division two years later. In 1961, the club returned to their previous name of CD Almoradí.

== Season to season ==
Season	Tier	Division	Place	Copa del Rey
1943–44	5	2ª Reg.	2nd	
1944–45	4	1ª Reg.	2nd	
1945–46	4	1ª Reg.	2nd	
1946–47	4	1ª Reg.	2nd	
1947–48	3	3ª	10th	Second round
1948–1952	DNP			
1952–53	5	2ª Reg.	3rd	
1953–54	DNP			
1954–55	4	1ª Reg.	7th	
1955–56	4	1ª Reg.	3rd	
1956–57	3	3ª	16th	
1957–58	3	3ª	11th	
1958–59	3	3ª	7th	
1959–60	3	3ª	15th	
1960–61	3	3ª	10th	
1961–62	3	3ª	11th	
1962–63	3	3ª	16th	
1963–64	5	2ª Reg.		
1964–65	5	2ª Reg.		
1965–66	5	2ª Reg.		

Season	Tier	Division	Place	Copa del Rey
1966–67	5	2ª Reg.		
1967–68	5	2ª Reg.		
1968–69	5	2ª Reg.	5th	
1969–70	5	2ª Reg.	2nd	
1970–71	5	2ª Reg.	2nd	
1971–72	5	1ª Reg.	5th	
1972–73	5	1ª Reg.	9th	
1973–74	5	1ª Reg.	1st	
1974–75	4	Reg. Pref.	8th	
1975–76	4	Reg. Pref.	13th	
1976–77	4	Reg. Pref.	5th	
1977–78	5	Reg. Pref.	16th	
1978–79	5	Reg. Pref.	8th	
1979–80	5	Reg. Pref.	8th	
1980–81	4	3ª	16th	
1981–82	4	3ª	19th	
1982–83	5	Reg. Pref.	16th	
1983–84	5	Reg. Pref.	17th	
1984–85	5	Reg. Pref.	5th	
1985–86	5	Reg. Pref.	10th	

Season	Tier	Division	Place	Copa del Rey
1986–87	5	Reg. Pref.	4th	
1987–88	4	3ª	18th	
1988–89	5	Reg. Pref.	17th	
1989–90	5	Reg. Pref.	6th	
1990–91	5	Reg. Pref.	7th	
1991–92	5	Reg. Pref.	7th	
1992–93	5	Reg. Pref.	5th	
1993–94	5	Reg. Pref.	16th	
1994–95	5	Reg. Pref.	2nd	
1995–96	4	3ª	15th	
1996–97	4	3ª	18th	
1997–98	5	Reg. Pref.	4th	
1998–99	5	Reg. Pref.	18th	
1999–2000	6	1ª Reg.	6th	
2000–01	6	1ª Reg.	1st	
2001–02	5	Reg. Pref.	9th	
2002–03	5	Reg. Pref.	6th	
2003–04	5	Reg. Pref.	16th	
2004–05	6	1ª Reg.	3rd	
2005–06	6	1ª Reg.	2nd	

Season	Tier	Division	Place	Copa del Rey
2006–07	5	Reg. Pref.	7th	
2007–08	5	Reg. Pref.	6th	
2008–09	5	Reg. Pref.	16th	
2009–10	6	1ª Reg.	11th	
2010–11	6	1ª Reg.	2nd	
2011–12	5	Reg. Pref.	10th	
2012–13	5	Reg. Pref.	2nd	
2013–14	5	Reg. Pref.	5th	
2014–15	5	Reg. Pref.	2nd	
2015–16	5	Reg. Pref.	3rd	
2016–17	4	3ª	20th	
2017–18	5	Reg. Pref.	13th	
2018–19	5	Reg. Pref.	5th	
2019–20	5	Reg. Pref.	14th	
2020–21	5	Reg. Pref.	3rd	
2021–22	6	Reg. Pref.	8th	
2022–23	6	Reg. Pref.	14th	
2023–24	7	1ª FFCV	4th	
2024–25	7	1ª FFCV	4th	
2025–26	7	1ª FFCV	2nd	

Season	Tier	Division	Place	Copa del Rey
2026–27	6	Lliga Com.		

- 14 seasons in Tercera División
