= UD Altea =

Spanish football club

Altea
- Full name: Unión Deportiva Altea
- Founded: 1962
- Ground: Garganes, Altea, Alicante, Valencian Community, Spain
- Capacity: 2,000
- President: Francisco Bolo
- Head coach: Pepe Guzmán
- League: Segona FFCV – Group 7
- 2024–25: Segona FFCV – Group 7, 12th of 16
Home colours	Away colours

Unión Deportiva Altea is a Spanish football team based in Altea, in the Valencian Community. It was founded in 1962, and plays in Segona FFCV – Group 7, holding home matches at Garganes stadium, which has a capacity of 2,000 seats.

== Season to season ==
Season	Tier	Division	Place	Copa del Rey
1963–64	6	3ª Reg.	3rd	
1964–65	5	2ª Reg.		
1965–66	4	1ª Reg.	11th	
1966–67	4	1ª Reg.	5th	
1967–68	4	1ª Reg.	3rd	
1968–69	4	1ª Reg.	9th	
1969–70	4	1ª Reg.	7th	
1970–71	4	1ª Reg.	4th	
1971–72	4	Reg. Pref.	4th	
1972–73	4	Reg. Pref.	11th	
1973–74	4	Reg. Pref.	11th	
1974–75	4	Reg. Pref.	10th	
1975–76	4	Reg. Pref.	15th	
1976–77	4	Reg. Pref.	21st	
1977–78	5	Reg. Pref.	18th	
1978–79	6	1ª Reg.	14th	
1979–80	6	1ª Reg.	15th	
1980–81	6	1ª Reg.	18th	
1981–82	6	1ª Reg.	7th	
1982–83	6	1ª Reg.	12th	

Season	Tier	Division	Place	Copa del Rey
1983–84	6	1ª Reg.	20th	
1984–85	6	1ª Reg.	12th	
1985–86	6	1ª Reg.	13th	
1986–87	6	1ª Reg.	2nd	
1987–88	5	Reg. Pref.	16th	
1988–89	5	Reg. Pref.	12th	
1989–90	5	Reg. Pref.	3rd	
1990–91	5	Reg. Pref.	4th	
1991–92	5	Reg. Pref.	10th	
1992–93	5	Reg. Pref.	20th	
1993–94	6	1ª Reg.	2nd	
1994–95	5	Reg. Pref.	7th	
1995–96	5	Reg. Pref.	10th	
1996–97	5	Reg. Pref.	13th	
1997–98	5	Reg. Pref.	15th	
1998–99	6	1ª Reg.	2nd	
1999–2000	5	Reg. Pref.	17th	
2000–01	6	1ª Reg.	1st	
2001–02	5	Reg. Pref.	4th	
2002–03	5	Reg. Pref.	5th	

Season	Tier	Division	Place	Copa del Rey
2003–04	5	Reg. Pref.	4th	
2004–05	5	Reg. Pref.	6th	
2005–06	5	Reg. Pref.	9th	
2006–07	5	Reg. Pref.	6th	
2007–08	5	Reg. Pref.	5th	
2008–09	5	Reg. Pref.	3rd	
2009–10	5	Reg. Pref.	7th	
2010–11	5	Reg. Pref.	1st	
2011–12	4	3ª	22nd	
2012–13	5	Reg. Pref.	16th	
2013–14	6	1ª Reg.	5th	
2014–15	6	1ª Reg.	11th	
2015–16	6	1ª Reg.	1st	
2016–17	5	Reg. Pref.	16th	
2017–18	6	1ª Reg.	4th	
2018–19	6	1ª Reg.	4th	
2019–20	6	1ª Reg.	5th	
2020–21	6	1ª Reg.	2nd	
2021–22	7	1ª Reg.	2nd	
2022–23	7	1ª Reg.	7th	

Season	Tier	Division	Place	Copa del Rey
2023–24	8	2ª FFCV	10th	
2024–25	8	2ª FFCV	12th	
2025–26	8	2ª FFCV	9th	
2026–27	8	2ª FFCV		

- 1 season in Tercera División
