= CD Soneja =

Spanish football club

Soneja
- Full name: Club Deportivo Soneja
- Founded: 1928
- Ground: El Arco, Soneja, Valencian Community, Spain
- Capacity: 1,000
- President: Ernesto Mateo
- Manager: Carlos Ortí
- League: Tercera Federación – Group 6
- 2025–26: Tercera Federación – Group 6, 10th of 18
Home colours	Away colours

Club Deportivo Soneja is a football team based in Soneja in the autonomous community of Valencian Community. Founded in 1928, the team plays in Tercera Federación – Group 6. The club's home ground is Campo El Arco, which has a capacity of 1,000 spectators.

== History ==
Founded in 1928, Soneja only played regional football until June 2023, when the club's promotion to Tercera Federación was confirmed due to a league expansion.

== Season to season ==
Season	Tier	Division	Place	Copa del Rey
1928–1973	—	Regional	—	
1973–74	7	3ª Reg.	7th	
1974–75	7	3ª Reg.	14th	
1975–76	7	3ª Reg.	17th	
1976–77	7	3ª Reg.	3rd	
1977–78	8	3ª Reg.	8th	
1978–79	8	3ª Reg.	2nd	
1979–80	7	2ª Reg.	11th	
1980–81	7	2ª Reg.	7th	
1981–82	7	2ª Reg.	7th	
1982–83	7	2ª Reg.	13th	
1983–84	7	2ª Reg.	15th	
1984–85	7	2ª Reg.	8th	
1985–86	7	2ª Reg.	13th	
1986–87	7	2ª Reg.	15th	
1987–88	7	2ª Reg.	14th	
1988–89	7	2ª Reg.	8th	
1989–90	7	2ª Reg.	13th	
1990–91	7	2ª Reg.	12th	
1991–92	7	2ª Reg.	10th	

Season	Tier	Division	Place	Copa del Rey
1992–93	7	2ª Reg.	18th	
1993–94	7	2ª Reg.	7th	
1994–95	7	2ª Reg.	12th	
1995–96	7	2ª Reg.	10th	
1996–97	7	2ª Reg.	6th	
1997–98	7	2ª Reg.	10th	
1998–99	7	2ª Reg.	2nd	
1999–2000	6	1ª Reg.	16th	
2000–01	7	2ª Reg.	9th	
2001–02	7	2ª Reg.	9th	
2002–03	7	2ª Reg.	15th	
2003–04	7	2ª Reg.	9th	
2004–05	7	2ª Reg.	13th	
2005–06	7	2ª Reg.	9th	
2006–07	7	2ª Reg.	13th	
2007–08	7	2ª Reg.	6th	
2008–09	7	2ª Reg.	6th	
2009–10	7	2ª Reg.	8th	
2010–11	7	2ª Reg.	4th	
2011–12	7	2ª Reg.	5th	

Season	Tier	Division	Place	Copa del Rey
2012–13	7	2ª Reg.	4th	
2013–14	7	2ª Reg.	3rd	
2014–15	7	2ª Reg.	4th	
2015–16	7	2ª Reg.	7th	
2016–17	7	2ª Reg.	2nd	
2017–18	6	1ª Reg.	3rd	
2018–19	6	1ª Reg.	1st	
2019–20	5	Reg. Pref.	6th	
2020–21	5	Reg. Pref.	8th	
2021–22	6	Reg. Pref.	3rd	
2022–23	6	Reg. Pref.	1st	
2023–24	5	3ª Fed.	12th	
2024–25	5	3ª Fed.	9th	
2025–26	5	3ª Fed.	10th	
2026–27	5	3ª Fed.		

- 4 seasons in Tercera Federación
