= UD Juventud Barrio del Cristo =

Juventud Barrio Cristo
- Nickname: El barrio
- Founded: 1994
- Ground: El Perdiguer; Aldaia, Valencian Community, Spain
- Capacity: 2,000
- League: Primera FFCV – Group 2
- 2025–26: Primera FFCV – Group 2, 10th of 16
| Home colours | Away colours |

Unión Deportiva Juventud Barrio del Cristo is a football team based in Quart de Poblet–Aldaia in the Valencian Community. Founded in 1994, they play in the Primera FFCV – Group 2. The club's home ground is El Perdiguer, which has a capacity of 2,000 spectators.

== Season to season ==
| Season | Tier | Division | Place | Copa del Rey |
|---|---|---|---|---|
| 1994–95 | 7 | 2ª Reg. | 4th | |
| 1995–96 | 7 | 2ª Reg. | 1st | |
| 1996–97 | 6 | 1ª Reg. | 15th | |
| 1997–98 | 6 | 1ª Reg. | 14th | |
| 1998–99 | 6 | 1ª Reg. | 15th | |
| 1999–2000 | 6 | 1ª Reg. | 2nd | |
| 2000–01 | 5 | Reg. Pref. | 12th | |
| 2001–02 | 5 | Reg. Pref. | 1st | |
| 2002–03 | 4 | 3ª | 21st | |
| 2003–04 | 5 | Reg. Pref. | 9th | |
| 2004–05 | 5 | Reg. Pref. | 9th | |
| 2005–06 | 5 | Reg. Pref. | 4th | |
| 2006–07 | 5 | Reg. Pref. | 1st | |
| 2007–08 | 4 | 3ª | 16th | |
| 2008–09 | 4 | 3ª | 15th | |
| 2009–10 | 4 | 3ª | 6th | |
| 2010–11 | 4 | 3ª | 10th | |
| 2011–12 | 4 | 3ª | 21st | |
| 2012–13 | 5 | Reg. Pref. | 9th | |
| 2013–14 | 5 | Reg. Pref. | 7th | |

| Season | Tier | Division | Place | Copa del Rey |
|---|---|---|---|---|
| 2013–14 | 5 | Reg. Pref. | 7th | |
| 2014–15 | 5 | Reg. Pref. | 3rd | |
| 2015–16 | 5 | Reg. Pref. | 10th | |
| 2016–17 | 5 | Reg. Pref. | 10th | |
| 2017–18 | 5 | Reg. Pref. | 9th | |
| 2018–19 | 5 | Reg. Pref. | 13th | |
| 2019–20 | 5 | Reg. Pref. | 7th | |
| 2020–21 | 5 | Reg. Pref. | 11th | |
| 2021–22 | 6 | Reg. Pref. | 8th | |
| 2022–23 | 7 | 1ª Reg. | 5th | |
| 2023–24 | 8 | 2ª FFCV | 1st | |
| 2024–25 | 7 | 1ª FFCV | 7th | |
| 2025–26 | 7 | 1ª FFCV | 10th | |
| 2026–27 | 7 | 1ª FFCV | | |

- 6 seasons in Tercera División

== Uniform ==
- Uniform holder: Red T-shirt, blue pants and medium blue.
- Uniform alternative: Not available.

== Stadium ==
The Polideportivo Municipal El Perdiguer is the home where the Barrio del Cristo dispute their encounters. This field of football is within the municipality of Aldaia and was officially launched in 2001 within the premises of the sports center. Their ground game is artificial turf since the summer of 2006, it was above ground and its dimensions are 100 by 60 meters. Their total capacity is around 2000 spectators, and has a tier side deck.
