= Ribarroja CF =

Spanish football club

Ribarroja
- Full name: Ribarroja Club de Fútbol
- Founded: 1942
- Ground: Estadio Municipal, Riba-roja, Valencia, Spain
- Capacity: 3,000
- President: (Spain) José Reig
- Head coach: (Spain) Javi Pons
- League: Lliga Comunitat – North
- 2024–25: Lliga Comunitat – North, 7th of 16
Home colours	Away colours

Ribarroja Club de Fútbol is a Spanish football team based in Riba-roja de Túria, in the autonomous community of Valencia. Founded in 1942 it plays in Lliga Comunitat – North, holding home games at Estadio Municipal de Ribarroja, which has a capacity of 3,000 spectators.

== Season to season ==
Season	Tier	Division	Place	Copa del Rey
1944–45	5	2ª Reg.	1st	
1945–46	4	1ª Reg.	3rd	
1946–47	4	1ª Reg.	7th	
1947–48	4	1ª Reg.	5th	
1948–49	4	1ª Reg.	8th	
1949–50	4	1ª Reg.	14th	
1950–1956	DNP			
1956–57	5	2ª Reg.	4th	
1957–58	5	2ª Reg.	6th	
1958–59	5	2ª Reg.	3rd	
1959–60	5	2ª Reg.	4th	
1960–61	5	2ª Reg.		
1961–62	5	2ª Reg.	5th	
1962–63	5	2ª Reg.		
1963–64	5	2ª Reg.	2nd	
1964–65	5	2ª Reg.	1st	
1965–66	4	1ª Reg.	16th	
1966–67	4	1ª Reg.	10th	
1967–68	4	1ª Reg.	20th	
1968–69	5	2ª Reg.	8th	

Season	Tier	Division	Place	Copa del Rey
1969–70	5	2ª Reg.	10th	
1970–71	5	1ª Reg.	11th	
1971–72	5	1ª Reg.	17th	
1972–73	6	2ª Reg.		
1973–74	5	1ª Reg.	8th	
1974–75	5	1ª Reg.	17th	
1975–76	5	1ª Reg.	17th	
1976–77	5	1ª Reg.	11th	
1977–78	6	1ª Reg.	16th	
1978–79	6	1ª Reg.	19th	
1979–80	7	2ª Reg.	2nd	
1980–81	6	1ª Reg.	15th	
1981–82	6	1ª Reg.	18th	
1982–83	6	1ª Reg.	9th	
1983–84	6	1ª Reg.	16th	
1984–85	6	1ª Reg.	1st	
1985–86	5	Reg. Pref.	12th	
1986–87	5	Reg. Pref.	8th	
1987–88	5	Reg. Pref.	2nd	
1988–89	5	Reg. Pref.	1st	

Season	Tier	Division	Place	Copa del Rey
1989–90	4	3ª	7th	
1990–91	4	3ª	16th	
1991–92	4	3ª	17th	
1992–93	5	Reg. Pref.	20th	
1993–94	6	1ª Reg.	15th	
1994–95	6	1ª Reg.	6th	
1995–96	6	1ª Reg.	6th	
1996–97	6	1ª Reg.	3rd	
1997–98	6	1ª Reg.	1st	
1998–99	5	Reg. Pref.	5th	
1999–2000	5	Reg. Pref.	8th	
2000–01	5	Reg. Pref.	11th	
2001–02	5	Reg. Pref.	6th	
2002–03	5	Reg. Pref.	9th	
2003–04	5	Reg. Pref.	4th	
2004–05	5	Reg. Pref.	3rd	
2005–06	5	Reg. Pref.	7th	
2006–07	5	Reg. Pref.	3rd	
2007–08	5	Reg. Pref.	3rd	
2008–09	4	3ª	14th	

Season	Tier	Division	Place	Copa del Rey
2009–10	4	3ª	13th	
2010–11	4	3ª	15th	
2011–12	4	3ª	15th	
2012–13	4	3ª	16th	
2013–14	4	3ª	13th	
2014–15	4	3ª	18th	
2015–16	5	Reg. Pref.	12th	
2016–17	5	Reg. Pref.	2nd	
2017–18	5	Reg. Pref.	2nd	
2018–19	5	Reg. Pref.	2nd	
2019–20	5	Reg. Pref.	11th	
2020–21	5	Reg. Pref.	3rd	
2021–22	6	Reg. Pref.	3rd	
2022–23	6	Reg. Pref.	6th	
2023–24	6	Lliga Com.	3rd	
2024–25	6	Lliga Com.	7th	
2025–26	6	Lliga Com.	2nd	
2026–27	6	Lliga Com.		

- 7 seasons in Tercera División

== Famous players ==
- (Spain) Miguel Albiol
- (Spain) Raúl Albiol
- (Spain) Diego Ribera
