= Miguel Muñoz Trophy =

Football award for team managers in Spanish football

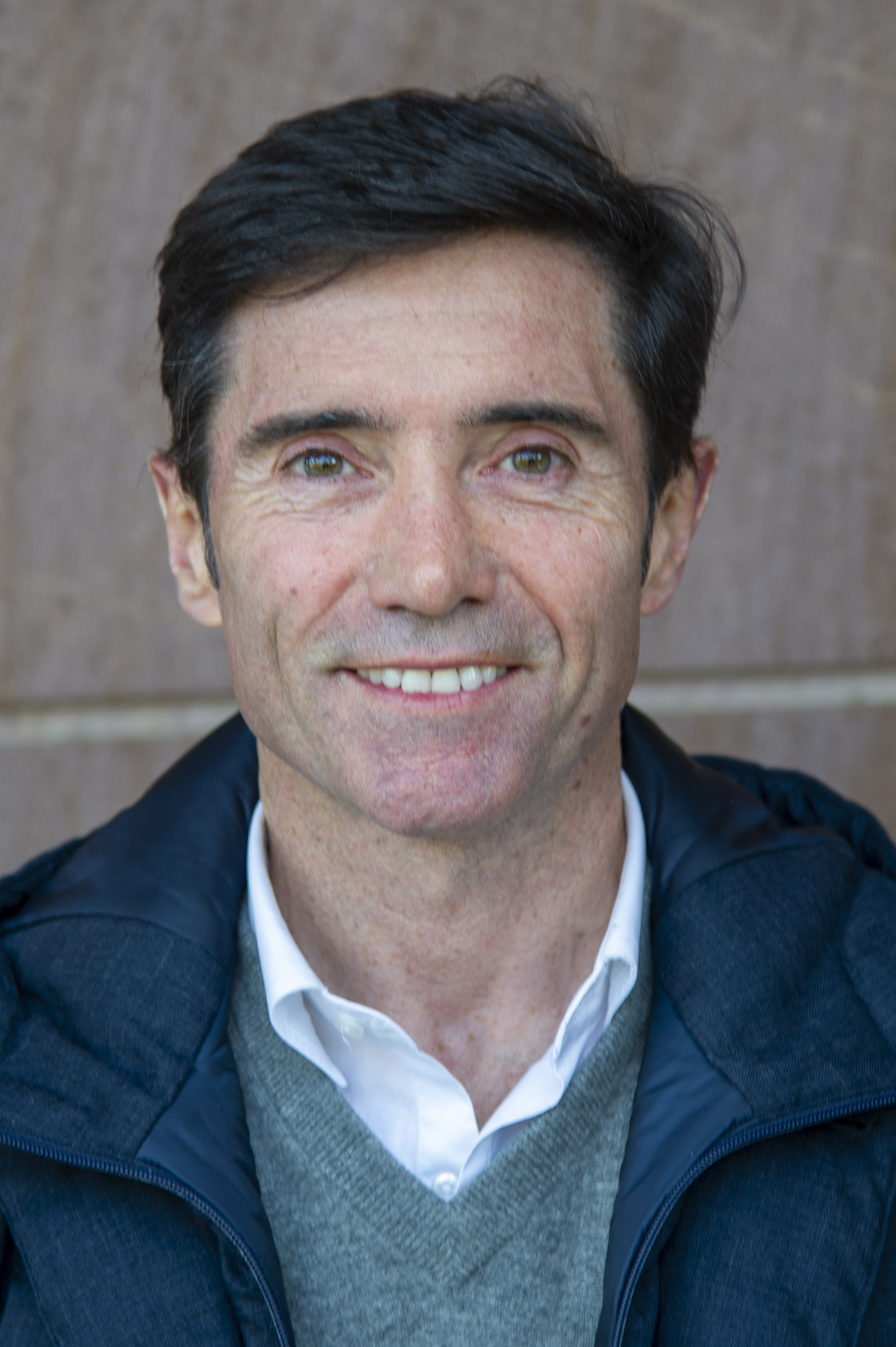
Marcelino is a three-time winner, winning La Liga's award with both Recreativo and Valencia, and the Segunda División award with Zaragoza. He and Juande Ramos (Sevilla) were the first ever co-winners, in La Liga in 2006–07.

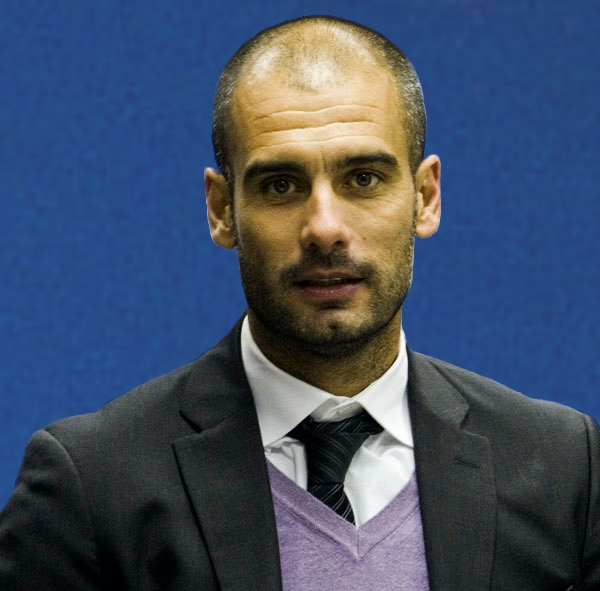
Pep Guardiola was the first ever two-time winner in La Liga, with Barcelona.

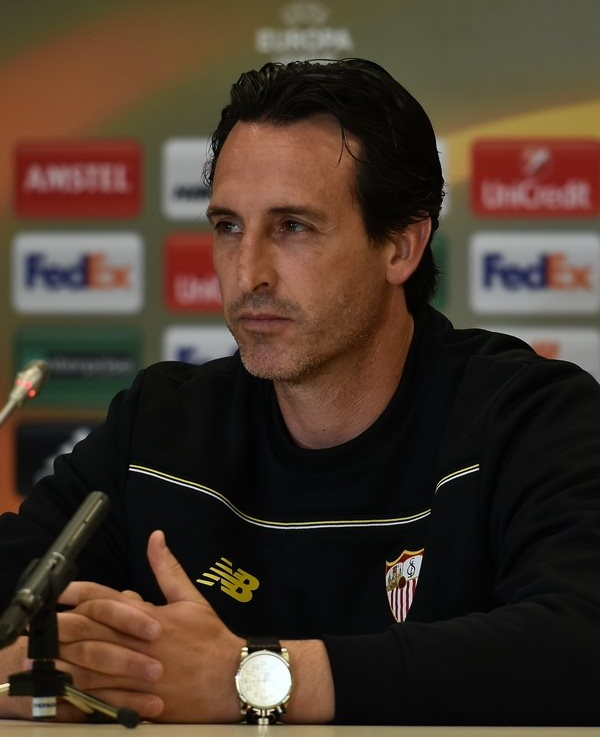
Unai Emery was the first ever two-time winner in Segunda División, with Lorca Deportiva and Almería.

The Miguel Muñoz Trophy (Spanish: Trofeo Miguel Muñoz) is a football award for team managers in Spanish football, established by Spanish newspaper Marca in 2006, in memory of the legendary Real Madrid manager Miguel Muñoz.

The award is based on MARCA's subjective scoring system: in which a manager is scored out of three, each match, for his team's performances. The manager with the highest points total, in each of La Liga and the Segunda División, is declared their respective league's winner at the end of the season.

== La Liga ==
Season	Manager(s)	Club	Score
2005–06	(Germany) Bernd Schuster	Getafe	63
2006–07	(Spain) Juande Ramos	Sevilla	67
2006–07	(Spain) Marcelino	Recreativo Huelva	67
2007–08	(Chile) Manuel Pellegrini	Villarreal	69
2008–09	(Spain) Pep Guardiola	Barcelona	77
2009–10	(Spain) Pep Guardiola	Barcelona	77
2010–11	(Portugal) José Mourinho	Real Madrid	72
2011–12	(Portugal) José Mourinho	Real Madrid	77
2012–13	(Spain) Tito Vilanova	Barcelona	252
2013–14	(Argentina) Diego Simeone	Atlético Madrid	269.5
2014–15	(Italy) Carlo Ancelotti	Real Madrid	247.5
2015–16	(Argentina) Diego Simeone	Atlético Madrid	243.5
2016–17	(Spain) José Luis Mendilibar	Eibar	67
2016–17	(Spain) Asier Garitano	Leganés	67
2017–18	(Spain) Marcelino	Valencia	69
2018–19	(Spain) José Bordalás	Getafe	68
2019–20	(France) Zinedine Zidane	Real Madrid	67
2019–20	(Spain) Julen Lopetegui	Sevilla	67
2020–21	(Argentina) Diego Simeone	Atlético Madrid	72
2021–22	(Italy) Carlo Ancelotti	Real Madrid	69
2021–22	(Chile) Manuel Pellegrini	Real Betis	69
2022–23	(Spain) Imanol Alguacil	Real Sociedad	67
2023–24	(Spain) Míchel	Girona	76
2024–25	(Germany) Hansi Flick	Barcelona	67

== Segunda División ==
Season	Manager	Club	Score
2005–06	(Spain) Unai Emery	Lorca Deportiva	76
2006–07	(Spain) Unai Emery	Almería	78
2007–08	(Spain) Manuel Preciado	Sporting Gijón	77
2008–09	(Spain) Marcelino	Zaragoza	78
2009–10	(Spain) Luis García	Levante	81
2010–11	(Spain) José Ramón Sandoval	Rayo Vallecano	85
2011–12	(Spain) Juan Antonio Anquela	Alcorcón	84
2012–13	(Spain) Fran Escribá	Elche	293.5
2013–14	(Spain) Gaizka Garitano	Eibar	272
2014–15	(Spain) Abelardo	Sporting Gijón	287.5
2015–16	(Spain) Asier Garitano	Leganés	266.5
2016–17	(Spain) Juan Muñiz	Levante	78
2017–18	(Spain) Rubi	Huesca	76
2018–19	(Spain) Diego Martínez	Granada	80
2019–20	(Spain) Míchel	Huesca	72
2020–21	(Spain) Luis García	Mallorca	72
2021–22	(Spain) Rubi	Almería	75
2022–23	(Spain) Rubén Albés	Albacete	81
2023–24	(Spain) Borja Jiménez	Leganés	77
2024–25	(Spain) José Alberto	Racing Santander	75

== See also ==
- Pichichi Trophy
- Zamora Trophy
- Zarra Trophy
- Trofeo Alfredo Di Stéfano
- Don Balón Award
