= SD Sueca =

Sueca
- Full name: Sociedad Deportiva Sueca
- Nickname: Arrossers
- Founded: 20 December 1935; 90 years ago
- Ground: L'Infantil, Sueca, Valencia, Spain
- Capacity: 1,000
- President: Raúl Sancho Solás
- Head coach: Edu Palomares
- League: Primera FFCV – Group 3
- 2024–25: Lliga Comunitat – North, 16th of 16 (relegated)
Home colours	Away colours

Sociedad Deportiva Sueca is a Spanish football team based in Sueca, in the Valencian Community. Founded in 1935, it plays in Primera FFCV – Group 3, holding home matches at Camp de l'Infantil.

== Season to season ==
Season	Tier	Division	Place	Copa del Rey
1940–41	5	2ª Reg.	1st	
1941–42	4	2ª Reg.	1st	
1942–43	4	2ª Reg.	1st	
1943–44	3	3ª	6th	Second round
1944–45	4	1ª Reg.	1st	
1945–46	3	3ª	8th	
1946–47	3	3ª	8th	
1947–48	3	3ª	5th	Second round
1948–49	3	3ª	13th	First round
1949–50	3	3ª	18th	
1950–51	4	1ª Reg.	13th	
1951–52	4	1ª Reg.	15th	
1952–53	4	1ª Reg.	15th	
1953–54	4	1ª Reg.	12th	
1954–55	4	1ª Reg.	2nd	
1955–56	4	1ª Reg.	3rd	
1956–57	4	1ª Reg.	5th	
1957–58	4	1ª Reg.	2nd	
1958–59	3	3ª	3rd	
1959–60	3	3ª	8th	

Season	Tier	Division	Place	Copa del Rey
1960–61	3	3ª	6th	
1961–62	3	3ª	9th	
1962–63	3	3ª	12th	
1963–64	3	3ª	12th	
1964–65	3	3ª	4th	
1965–66	3	3ª	9th	
1966–67	3	3ª	17th	
1967–68	3	3ª	5th	
1968–69	3	3ª	17th	
1969–70	3	3ª	13th	Fourth round
1970–71	4	Reg. Pref.	10th	
1971–72	4	Reg. Pref.	19th	
1972–73	5	1ª Reg.	1st	
1973–74	4	Reg. Pref.	18th	
1974–75	5	1ª Reg.	11th	
1975–76	5	1ª Reg.	5th	
1976–77	5	1ª Reg.	5th	
1977–78	6	1ª Reg.	3rd	
1978–79	6	1ª Reg.	3rd	
1979–80	6	1ª Reg.	19th	

Season	Tier	Division	Place	Copa del Rey
1980–81	6	1ª Reg.	4th	
1981–82	6	1ª Reg.	3rd	
1982–83	6	1ª Reg.	1st	
1983–84	5	Reg. Pref.	13th	
1984–85	5	Reg. Pref.	18th	
1985–86	6	1ª Reg.	1st	
1986–87	5	Reg. Pref.	2nd	
1987–88	3	3ª	4th	
1988–89	3	3ª	14th	
1989–90	3	3ª	5th	
1990–91	3	3ª	1st	
1991–92	3	3ª	3rd	First round
1992–93	3	3ª	9th	First round
1993–94	3	3ª	11th	
1994–95	3	3ª	12th	
1995–96	3	3ª	8th	
1996–97	3	3ª	17th	
1997–98	3	3ª	13th	
1998–99	3	3ª	18th	
1999–2000	5	Reg. Pref.	5th	

Season	Tier	Division	Place	Copa del Rey
2000–01	5	Reg. Pref.	4th	
2001–02	5	Reg. Pref.	1st	
2002–03	5	Reg. Pref.	2nd	
2003–04	5	Reg. Pref.	5th	
2004–05	5	Reg. Pref.	4th	
2005–06	5	Reg. Pref.	1st	
2006–07	3	3ª	19th	
2007–08	5	Reg. Pref.	16th	
2008–09	6	1ª Reg.	11th	
2009–10	6	1ª Reg.	4th	
2010–11	6	1ª Reg.	2nd	
2011–12	5	Reg. Pref.	14th	
2012–13	5	Reg. Pref.	5th	
2013–14	5	Reg. Pref.	7th	
2014–15	5	Reg. Pref.	9th	
2015–16	5	Reg. Pref.	18th	
2016–17	6	1ª Reg.	12th	
2017–18	6	1ª Reg.	6th	
2018–19	6	1ª Reg.	2nd	
2019–20	5	Reg. Pref.	17th	

Season	Tier	Division	Place	Copa del Rey
2020–21	5	Reg. Pref.	5th	
2021–22	6	Reg. Pref.	5th	
2022–23	6	Reg. Pref.	6th	
2023–24	6	Lliga Com.	7th	
2024–25	6	Lliga Com.	16th	
2025–26	7	1ª FFCV	15th	
2026–27	8	2ª FFCV		

- 31 seasons in Tercera División
