= UD Rayo Ibense =

Spanish football club

Rayo Ibense
- Full name: Unión Deportiva Rayo Ibense
- Founded: 1930
- Ground: Francisco Vilaplana Mariel, Ibi, Alicante, Valencian Community, Spain
- Capacity: 3,000
- President: Juan Cortés
- Manager: Rubén Sanz
- League: Lliga Comunitat – South
- 2025–26: Lliga Comunitat – South, 9th of 18
Home colours	Away colours

Unión Deportiva Rayo Ibense is a football team based in Ibi, Alicante, in the autonomous community of Valencian Community. Founded in 1930, they play in Lliga Comunitat – South, holding home matches at the Francisco Vilaplana Mariel, which has a capacity of 3,000 spectators.

== History ==
Founded in 1930 as Unión Deportiva Ibense, the club merged with another Rayo in the city in 1956 to form Rayo Ibense Club de Fútbol. They first achieved promotion to Tercera División three years later, and spent nine consecutive seasons in the third tier before suffering relegation.

In 1987, after another four-year spell in Tercera, Rayo Ibense were renamed to Sociedad Deportiva Ibi. The club ceased activities in 1996, five years after being renamed to Unión Deportiva Rayo Ibense, but returned to action in the following year under the same name.

Rayo Ibense returned to the fourth tier in 2017, after a 32-year absence. In 2019 they suffered relegation, and achieved promotion to the Tercera Federación in June 2022.

== Season to season ==
Season	Tier	Division	Place	Copa del Rey
1956–57	4	1ª Reg.	4th	
1957–58	4	1ª Reg.	5th	
1958–59	4	1ª Reg.	1st	
1959–60	3	3ª	11th	
1960–61	3	3ª	11th	
1961–62	3	3ª	12th	
1962–63	3	3ª	10th	
1963–64	3	3ª	7th	
1964–65	3	3ª	7th	
1965–66	3	3ª	7th	
1966–67	3	3ª	13th	
1967–68	3	3ª	12th	
1968–69	4	1ª Reg.	13th	
1969–70	4	1ª Reg.	10th	
1970–71	4	1ª Reg.	18th	
1971–72	4	Reg. Pref.	20th	
1972–73	5	1ª Reg.	3rd	
1973–74	4	Reg. Pref.	18th	
1974–75	5	1ª Reg.	1st	
1975–76	4	Reg. Pref.	19th	

Season	Tier	Division	Place	Copa del Rey
1976–77	4	Reg. Pref.	14th	
1977–78	5	Reg. Pref.	12th	
1978–79	6	1ª Reg.	2nd	
1979–80	6	1ª Reg.	1st	
1980–81	5	Reg. Pref.	4th	
1981–82	5	Reg. Pref.	7th	
1982–83	5	Reg. Pref.	3rd	
1983–84	4	3ª	14th	
1984–85	4	3ª	11th	
1985–86	4	3ª	16th	
1986–87	4	3ª	19th	
1987–88	5	Reg. Pref.	20th	
1988–89	6	1ª Reg.	1st	
1989–90	5	Reg. Pref.	11th	
1990–91	5	Reg. Pref.	18th	
1991–92	6	1ª Reg.	4th	
1992–93	6	1ª Reg.	4th	
1993–94	6	1ª Reg.	4th	
1994–95	6	1ª Reg.	16th	
1995–96	6	1ª Reg.	17th	

Season	Tier	Division	Place	Copa del Rey
1996–97	DNP			
1997–98	7	2ª Reg.	2nd	
1998–99	6	1ª Reg.	10th	
1999–2000	6	1ª Reg.	15th	
2000–01	7	2ª Reg.	4th	
2001–02	7	2ª Reg.	18th	
2002–03	7	2ª Reg.	3rd	
2003–04	6	1ª Reg.	13th	
2004–05	6	1ª Reg.	2nd	
2005–06	6	1ª Reg.	6th	
2006–07	6	1ª Reg.	13th	
2007–08	6	1ª Reg.	10th	
2008–09	6	1ª Reg.	9th	
2009–10	6	1ª Reg.	6th	
2010–11	6	1ª Reg.	2nd	
2011–12	5	Reg. Pref.	16th	
2012–13	6	1ª Reg.	1st	
2013–14	5	Reg. Pref.	4th	
2014–15	5	Reg. Pref.	1st	
2015–16	4	3ª	10th	

Season	Tier	Division	Place	Copa del Rey
2016–17	4	3ª	12th	
2017–18	4	3ª	15th	
2018–19	4	3ª	18th	
2019–20	5	Reg. Pref.	3rd	
2020–21	5	Reg. Pref.	4th	
2021–22	6	Reg. Pref.	2nd	
2022–23	5	3ª Fed.	13th	
2023–24	5	3ª Fed.	15th	
2024–25	5	3ª Fed.	18th	
2025–26	6	Lliga Com.	9th	
2026–27	6	Lliga Com.		

- 17 seasons in Tercera División
- 3 seasons in Tercera Federación
