= CD Buñol =

Spanish football team

Buñol
- Full name: Club Deportivo Buñol
- Founded: 1921; 105 years ago as Buñol Sporting Club
- Ground: Beltrán Báguena, Buñol, Valencian Community, Spain
- Capacity: 3,000
- President: Francisco Zanón
- Head coach: Alejandro San Isidro
- League: Tercera Federación – Group 6
- 2025–26: Tercera Federación – Group 6, 6th of 18
- Website: www.cdbunyol1921.com
Home colours	Away colours

Club Deportivo Buñol, commonly referred to as Buñol, is a Spanish football team based in Buñol in the autonomous Valencian Community. Founded in 1921, it plays in Tercera Federación – Group 6, holding home games at Campo de Fútbol Beltrán Báguena, with a capacity of 3,000 people.

== History ==
In November 2020, Buñol were drawn with Elche CF in the first round of the 2020–21 Copa del Rey, which marked their first ever official match against a La Liga club. The match was played at the Ciudad Deportiva de Buñol and ended 2–1, with the host almost pulling off the upset as they led up to the 66th minute.

In November 2023, Bunol again were drawn with a La Liga team, Real Sociedad, in the first round of the 2023–24 Copa del Rey; they lost narrowly by a 1–0 scoreline.

== Seasons ==
Season	Tier	Division	Place	Copa del Rey
1921–1954	—	Regional	—	
1954–55	5	2ª Reg.	2nd	
1955–56	4	1ª Reg.	6th	
1956–57	4	1ª Reg.	4th	
1957–58	4	1ª Reg.	8th	
1958–59	4	1ª Reg.	10th	
1959–60	4	1ª Reg.	11th	
1960–61	4	1ª Reg.	9th	
1961–62	4	1ª Reg.	7th	
1962–63	4	1ª Reg.	1st	
1963–64	3	3ª	10th	
1964–65	3	3ª	14th	
1965–66	3	3ª	12th	
1966–67	3	3ª	9th	
1967–68	3	3ª	11th	
1968–69	4	1ª Reg.	13th	
1969–70	4	1ª Reg.	15th	
1970–71	5	1ª Reg.	2nd	
1971–72	4	Reg. Pref.	15th	
1972–73	4	Reg. Pref.	14th	

Season	Tier	Division	Place	Copa del Rey
1973–74	4	Reg. Pref.	11th	
1974–75	4	Reg. Pref.	10th	
1975–76	4	Reg. Pref.	13th	
1976–77	4	Reg. Pref.	11th	
1977–78	5	Reg. Pref.	16th	
1978–79	6	1ª Reg.	4th	
1979–80	6	1ª Reg.	1st	
1980–81	5	Reg. Pref.	15th	
1981–82	5	Reg. Pref.	18th	
1982–83	6	1ª Reg.	4th	
1983–84	6	1ª Reg.	4th	
1984–85	5	Reg. Pref.	20th	
1985–86	6	1ª Reg.	13th	
1986–87	6	1ª Reg.	9th	
1987–88	6	1ª Reg.	2nd	
1988–89	5	Reg. Pref.	6th	
1989–90	5	Reg. Pref.	11th	
1990–91	5	Reg. Pref.	3rd	
1991–92	5	Reg. Pref.	4th	
1992–93	5	Reg. Pref.	8th	

Season	Tier	Division	Place	Copa del Rey
1993–94	5	Reg. Pref.	11th	
1994–95	5	Reg. Pref.	6th	
1995–96	5	Reg. Pref.	16th	
1996–97	5	Reg. Pref.	4th	
1997–98	5	Reg. Pref.	5th	
1998–99	5	Reg. Pref.	2nd	
1999–00	4	3ª	15th	
2000–01	4	3ª	20th	
2001–02	5	Reg. Pref.	3rd	
2002–03	5	Reg. Pref.	1st	
2003–04	4	3ª	18th	
2004–05	5	Reg. Pref.	10th	
2005–06	5	Reg. Pref.	4th	
2006–07	5	Reg. Pref.	4th	
2007–08	5	Reg. Pref.	2nd	
2008–09	5	Reg. Pref.	2nd	
2009–10	5	Reg. Pref.	1st	
2010–11	5	Reg. Pref.	4th	
2011–12	5	Reg. Pref.	4th	
2012–13	5	Reg. Pref.	14th	

Season	Tier	Division	Place	Copa del Rey
2013–14	5	Reg. Pref.	15th	
2014–15	5	Reg. Pref.	1st	
2015–16	4	3ª	17th	
2016–17	4	3ª	17th	
2017–18	4	3ª	19th	
2018–19	5	Reg. Pref.	5th	
2019–20	5	Reg. Pref.	1st	
2020–21	5	Reg. Pref.	1st	First round
2021–22	6	Reg. Pref.	2nd	
2022–23	6	Reg. Pref.	2nd	
2023–24	6	Lliga Com.	9th	First round
2024–25	6	Lliga Com.	1st	
2025–26	5	3ª Fed.	6th	
2026–27	5	3ª Fed.		

- 11 seasons in Tercera División
- 2 season in Tercera Federación

== Current squad ==
As of 19 April 2023

Note: Flags indicate national team as defined under FIFA eligibility rules; some limited exceptions apply. Players may hold more than one non-FIFA nationality.

No.	Pos.	Nation	Player
—	GK	ESP	Paco
—	GK	ESP	
—	DF	BRA	João Pedro Martins
—	DF	ESP	Rubén González
—	DF	ESP	Toni Cano
—	DF	ESP	Amador Diéguez
—	DF	ESP	Adrián Pérez
—	DF	ESP	César Cervera
—	MF	ESP	David Lara
—	MF	ESP	José Mateos
—	MF	ESP	Mario Cubells
—	MF	ESP	Andrés Gómez
—	MF	PUR	Gerald Díaz

No.	Pos.	Nation	Player
—	MF	ESP	David Pérez
—	MF	ESP	Daniel De la Cal
—	MF	ESP	Albert Valero
—	MF	ESP	JDaniel de Juan
—	MF	ESP	Imanol Alcarazi
—	FW	ESP	Carlos Prieto
—	FW	ESP	Pedro Moreno
—	FW	PUR	Ricardo Rivera

== Notable managers ==
- (Spain) Fran Escribá
