= Marcelino García Toral =

Spanish footballer & manager (born 1965)

Marcelino
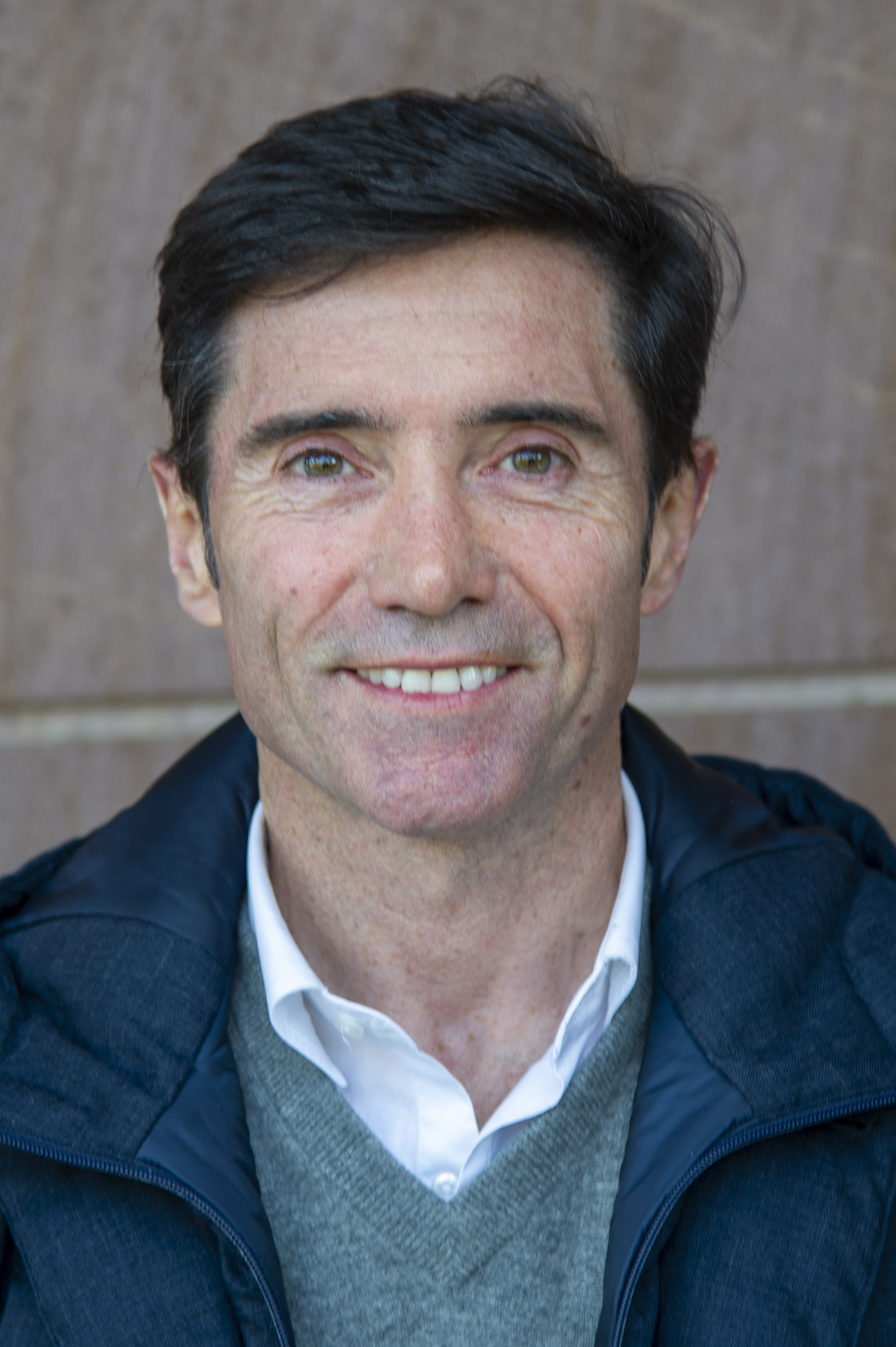
- Marcelino in 2020

Personal information
- Full name: Marcelino García Toral
- Date of birth: 14 August 1965 (age 61)
- Place of birth: Villaviciosa, Spain
- Height: 1.78 m (5 ft 10 in)
- Position: Attacking midfielder

Youth career
- Sporting Gijón

Senior career*
Years	Team	Apps	(Gls)
1983–1986	Sporting Gijón B	59	(9)
1985–1989	Sporting Gijón	74	(2)
1989–1990	Racing Santander	32	(4)
1990–1992	Levante	48	(1)
1992–1994	Elche	49	(1)
Total		262	(17)

International career
1983–1984	Spain U18	6	(0)
1985	Spain U19	1	(0)
1985	Spain U20	6	(1)
1985–1987	Spain U21	7	(0)

Managerial career
- 1997–1998: Lealtad
- 2001–2003: Sporting Gijón B
- 2003–2005: Sporting Gijón
- 2005–2007: Recreativo
- 2007–2008: Racing Santander
- 2008–2009: Zaragoza
- 2011: Racing Santander
- 2011–2012: Sevilla
- 2013–2016: Villarreal
- 2017–2019: Valencia
- 2021–2022: Athletic Bilbao
- 2023: Marseille
- 2023–2026: Villarreal
- * Club domestic league appearances and goals

Marcelino García Toral (Spanish pronunciation: [maɾθeˈlino ɣaɾˈθi.a toˈɾal]; (Note: In isolation, García is pronounced [ɡaɾˈθi.a].) born 14 August 1965), known simply as Marcelino, is a Spanish football manager and former player who played as an attacking midfielder.

In a ten-year senior career, he amassed La Liga totals of 74 matches and two goals, all at the service of Sporting de Gijón. He became a manager in 1997, working in the top division with Recreativo, Racing de Santander (two spells), Zaragoza, Sevilla, Villarreal, Valencia and Athletic Bilbao, being named best coach in Spain for the 2006–07 and 2017–18 seasons and winning the 2018–19 Copa del Rey with Valencia and the 2020–21 Supercopa de España with Athletic. After a brief stint in charge of Marseille, he returned to Villarreal in November 2023.

== Playing career ==
Born in Villaviciosa, Asturias, Marcelino was irregularly used in his first four professional seasons, at Sporting de Gijón. He did appear in a career-best 33 matches in the 1986–87 campaign, as the club finished fourth in La Liga. His top-flight debut was on 22 December 1985, in a 1–1 away draw against Celta.

After two Segunda División spells, with Racing de Santander and Levante, both ended in relegation, Marcelino moved to the lower leagues with Elche. He retired in 1994 at only 28, due to injury.

== Coaching career ==
=== Beginnings ===
Marcelino started coaching at 32 with lowly Lealtad, also in Asturias. In the early 2000s he worked in the Segunda División B, with Sporting's reserves.

From 2003 to 2005, Marcelino was in charge of the first team, finishing fifth and tenth in the second division, then signed with Recreativo de Huelva in the same league, which he led to promotion in his first season and a comfortable mid-table position in the top tier in the following, which made him the recipient of his first Miguel Muñoz Trophy.

=== Racing Santander and Zaragoza ===
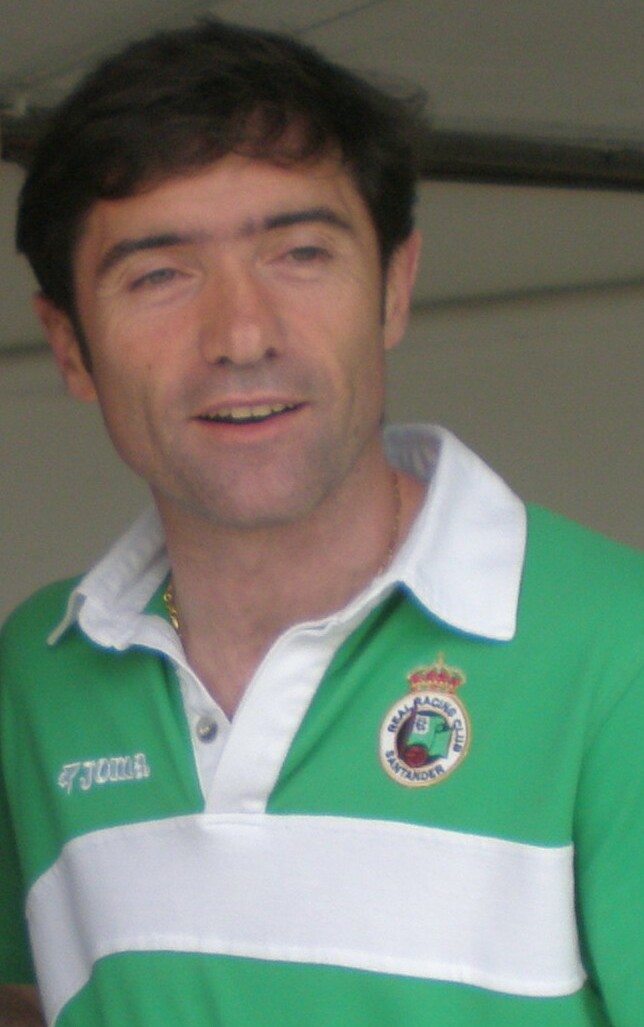
Marcelino as Racing Santander manager in 2008.

Marcelino resigned at the end of the season and took over at former club Santander, leading the Cantabrians to a best-ever sixth-place finish, with the subsequent qualification for the UEFA Cup. However, on 29 May 2008, he again moved teams, returning to division two and joining Real Zaragoza with the objective of a promotion, which was finally achieved; in the process of signing, he had rejected Valencia, and became the country's best paid manager at €2.4 million per year following the departure of Real Madrid's Bernd Schuster.

On 13 December 2009, following a string of poor results (the last a 1–2 home defeat to Athletic Bilbao), Marcelino was fired by Zaragoza, with the Aragonese side nonetheless still above the relegation zone. In early February 2011 he returned to Racing Santander, replacing Miguel Ángel Portugal.

=== Sevilla ===
Marcelino was appointed at Sevilla for 2011–12. On 6 February 2012, following seven games without a win – the last being a 1–2 home loss against Villarreal – and with the Andalusians ranking 11th, he was relieved of his duties.

=== Villarreal ===
Marcelino signed with Villarreal on 14 January 2013, returning the team to the top flight at the end of the campaign and going on to subsequently achieve three top-six finishes, which included a fourth place and a semi-final run in the Europa League in 2015–16.

On 10 August 2016, a few days before the first official match of the season, Marcelino was sacked for differences with the board of directors, particularly over the removal of Mateo Musacchio from club captaincy.

=== Valencia ===
On 11 May 2017, Marcelino was named at the helm of Valencia for the upcoming campaign after penning a two-year deal. He won the Copa del Rey in his second season at the Mestalla Stadium, defeating Barcelona 2–1 in the final held in Seville.

On 11 September 2019, however, Marcelino was dismissed.

=== Athletic Bilbao ===
On 4 January 2021, Marcelino was appointed as head coach of Athletic Bilbao on a contract until 30 June 2022. In his first three games in charge, he lost against Barcelona in the domestic league and defeated the same adversary and Real Madrid to win the Supercopa de España. He was also on the bench for two Spanish Cup finals in two weeks (the first having been postponed due to the COVID-19 pandemic), losing both.

On 24 May 2022, Marcelino announced he would be stepping down on 30 June.

=== Marseille ===
In June 2023, after one year of inactivity, Marcelino agreed to a deal at Ligue 1 club Marseille. He resigned on 20 September alleging personal reasons, seven matches into his tenure.

=== Villarreal return ===
Marcelino returned to Villarreal on 13 November 2023, signing a three-year contract; he was their fourth manager of the campaign after Quique Setién and Pacheta, with Miguel Ángel Tena also having acted as interim for one game. The following 7 March, on his return to the Stade Vélodrome, his side lost 4–0 in the first leg of the Europa League last 16.

On 4 May 2026, having led the club to two consecutive UEFA Champions League qualifications, Marcelino announced he would be departing at the end of the season.

== Managerial statistics ==
As of 24 May 2026

Managerial record by team and tenure
Team	From	To	Record								Ref
Team	From	To	G	W	D	L	GF	GA	GD	Win %	Ref
Lealtad	17 February 1997	30 June 1998	69	38	17	14	117	75	+42	55.07	
Sporting Gijón B	15 January 2001	19 July 2003	112	48	29	35	160	120	+40	42.86	
Sporting Gijón	19 July 2003	12 July 2005	86	35	22	29	100	82	+18	40.70	
Recreativo	12 July 2005	26 June 2007	84	38	22	24	124	90	+34	45.24	
Racing Santander	26 June 2007	28 May 2008	46	20	13	13	56	51	+5	43.48	
Zaragoza	28 May 2008	13 December 2009	59	26	17	16	97	73	+24	44.07	
Racing Santander	9 February 2011	7 June 2011	16	7	3	6	24	25	−1	43.75	
Sevilla	7 June 2011	6 February 2012	27	9	9	9	29	30	−1	33.33	
Villarreal	14 January 2013	10 August 2016	177	87	44	46	268	181	+87	49.15	
Valencia	23 May 2017	11 September 2019	110	55	29	26	168	107	+61	50.00	
Athletic Bilbao	4 January 2021	24 May 2022	75	28	26	21	92	79	+13	37.33	
Marseille	23 June 2023	20 September 2023	7	3	3	1	9	6	+3	42.86	
Villarreal	13 November 2023	24 May 2026	121	59	28	34	221	172	+49	48.76	
Total			989	453	262	274	1,465	1,091	+374	45.80	—

== Honours ==
=== Player ===
Spain U20

- FIFA U-20 World Cup runner-up: 1985

=== Manager ===
Lealtad

- Tercera División: 1997–98

Recreativo

- Segunda División: 2005–06

Valencia

- Copa del Rey: 2018–19

Athletic Bilbao

- Supercopa de España: 2021
- Copa del Rey runner-up: 2019–20, 2020–21

Individual

- Miguel Muñoz Trophy: 2006–07, 2017–18
- Miguel Muñoz Trophy (Segunda División): 2008–09
- La Liga Manager of the Month: September 2013, September 2015, March 2024, November 2025
