= Villena CF =

Spanish football club

Villena
- Full name: Villena Club de Fútbol
- Founded: 1920
- Ground: La Solana, Villena, Valencian Community, Spain
- Capacity: 3,000
- President: Juan Mateo Melenchón
- Manager: Frank Demouge
- League: Primera FFCV – Group 4
- 2025–26: Primera FFCV – Group 4, 11th of 16
- Website: https://www.villenaclubdefutbol.es/
Home colours	Away colours

Villena Club de Fútbol is a Spanish football team based in Villena, in the Valencian Community. Founded in 1920, they play in Primera FFCV – Group 4, holding home matches at Campo Municipal La Solana, with a capacity of 3,000 people.

== History ==
=== Club background ===
- Villena Football Club (1920–1941)
- Villena Club de Fútbol (1941–1970; 2006–)
- Club Deportivo Villena (1970–2004)
- Peña Villenense-Villena Club de Fútbol (2004–2006)

== Season to season ==
Season	Tier	Division	Place	Copa del Rey
1929–1933	—	Regional	—	
1933–34	5	2ª Reg.	5th	
1934–35	5	2ª Reg.	2nd	
1935–36	5	2ª Reg.	8th	
1936–1943	DNP			
1943–44	5	2ª Reg.	4th	
1944–1948	DNP			
1948–49	4	1ª Reg.	2nd	
1949–50	3	3ª	17th	
1950–51	3	3ª	12th	
1951–52	3	3ª	2nd	
1952–53	3	3ª	7th	
1953–54	3	3ª	11th	
1954–55	3	3ª	9th	
1955–56	DNP			
1956–57	DNP			
1957–58	4	1ª Reg.	7th	
1958–59	4	1ª Reg.	7th	
1959–60	4	1ª Reg.	17th	
1960–61	4	1ª Reg.	4th	

Season	Tier	Division	Place	Copa del Rey
1961–62	4	1ª Reg.	3rd	
1962–63	4	1ª Reg.	3rd	
1963–64	4	1ª Reg.	6th	
1964–65	4	1ª Reg.	11th	
1965–66	4	1ª Reg.	6th	
1966–67	4	1ª Reg.	10th	
1967–68	DNP			
1968–69	DNP			
1969–70	DNP			
1970–71	5	2ª Reg.	1st	
1971–72	4	Reg. Pref.	12th	
1972–73	4	Reg. Pref.	4th	
1973–74	4	Reg. Pref.	2nd	
1974–75	3	3ª	10th	First round
1975–76	3	3ª	7th	First round
1976–77	3	3ª	16th	First round
1977–78	4	3ª	9th	First round
1978–79	4	3ª	18th	First round
1979–80	4	3ª	11th	First round
1980–81	4	3ª	18th	

Season	Tier	Division	Place	Copa del Rey
1981–82	5	Reg. Pref.	5th	
1982–83	5	Reg. Pref.	11th	
1983–84	5	Reg. Pref.	2nd	
1984–85	4	3ª	17th	
1985–86	4	3ª	19th	
1986–87	5	Reg. Pref.	5th	
1987–88	5	Reg. Pref.	3rd	
1988–89	5	Reg. Pref.	9th	
1989–90	5	Reg. Pref.	4th	
1990–91	5	Reg. Pref.	1st	
1991–92	4	3ª	4th	
1992–93	4	3ª	3rd	
1993–94	4	3ª	12th	
1994–95	4	3ª	17th	
1995–96	4	3ª	19th	
1996–97	5	Reg. Pref.	6th	
1997–98	5	Reg. Pref.	13th	
1998–99	5	Reg. Pref.	4th	
1999–2000	5	Reg. Pref.	9th	
2000–01	5	Reg. Pref.	10th	

Season	Tier	Division	Place	Copa del Rey
2001–02	5	Reg. Pref.	14th	
2002–03	5	Reg. Pref.	8th	
2003–04	5	Reg. Pref.	17th	
2004–05	6	1ª Reg.	6th	
2005–06	6	1ª Reg.	11th	
2006–07	6	1ª Reg.	3rd	
2007–08	6	1ª Reg.	2nd	
2008–09	5	Reg. Pref.	18th	
2009–10	6	1ª Reg.	10th	
2010–11	6	1ª Reg.	6th	
2011–12	6	1ª Reg.	2nd	
2012–13	5	Reg. Pref.	17th	
2013–14	6	1ª Reg.	2nd	
2014–15	5	Reg. Pref.	10th	
2015–16	5	Reg. Pref.	15th	
2016–17	5	Reg. Pref.	13th	
2017–18	5	Reg. Pref.	9th	
2018–19	5	Reg. Pref.	17th	
2019–20	6	1ª Reg.	9th	
2020–21	6	1ª Reg.	4th	

Season	Tier	Division	Place	Copa del Rey
2021–22	7	1ª Reg.	1st	
2022–23	6	Reg. Pref.	13th	
2023–24	7	1ª FFCV	9th	
2024–25	7	1ª FFCV	12th	
2025–26	7	1ª FFCV	11th	
2026–27	7	1ª FFCV		

- 20 seasons in Tercera División
