= Silla CF =

Spanish football club

Silla
- Full name: Silla Club de Fútbol
- Nickname: Blanquets (The Whites)
- Founded: 1927
- Ground: Vicent Morera, Silla, Valencia, Spain
- Capacity: 5,000
- President: José Vicente Montesa
- Head coach: David Sanz
- League: Lliga Comunitat – North
- 2025–26: Lliga Comunitat – North, 8th of 16
- Website: sillacf.com
Home colours	Away colours

Silla Club de Fútbol is a Spanish football team based in Silla, in the Valencian Community. Founded in 1927, it plays in Lliga Comunitat – North, holding home matches at Complejo Deportivo Municipal Vicent Morera.

== History ==
Founded in 1927, Silla played in the regional leagues until 2016, when they achieved promotion to Tercera División. In the 2020–21 season, the club reached the play-offs, being eliminated by CD Roda.

== Season to season ==
Season	Tier	Division	Place	Copa del Rey
1955–56	6	3ª Reg.		
1956–57	5	2ª Reg.	8th	
1957–58	5	2ª Reg.	5th	
1958–59	5	2ª Reg.		
1959–60	5	2ª Reg.	12th	
1960–61	5	2ª Reg.		
1961–62	5	2ª Reg.	10th	
1962–63	5	2ª Reg.		
1963–64	5	2ª Reg.	12th	
1964–65	5	2ª Reg.	1st	
1965–66	4	1ª Reg.	17th	
1966–67	4	1ª Reg.	20th	
1967–68	5	2ª Reg.	6th	
1968–69	5	2ª Reg.	4th	
1969–70	5	2ª Reg.	5th	
1970–71	5	1ª Reg.	10th	
1971–72	5	1ª Reg.	7th	
1972–73	5	1ª Reg.	16th	
1973–74	6	2ª Reg.	10th	
1974–75	6	2ª Reg.	3rd	

Season	Tier	Division	Place	Copa del Rey
1975–76	6	2ª Reg.	3rd	
1976–77	5	1ª Reg.	5th	
1977–78	6	1ª Reg.	2nd	
1978–79	5	Reg. Pref.	12th	
1979–80	5	Reg. Pref.	17th	
1980–81	5	Reg. Pref.	17th	
1981–82	5	Reg. Pref.	10th	
1982–83	5	Reg. Pref.	16th	
1983–84	5	Reg. Pref.	20th	
1984–85	6	1ª Reg.	20th	
1985–86	7	2ª Reg.	6th	
1986–87	7	2ª Reg.	1st	
1987–88	6	1ª Reg.	11th	
1988–89	6	1ª Reg.	3rd	
1989–90	5	Reg. Pref.	13th	
1990–91	5	Reg. Pref.	17th	
1991–92	6	1ª Reg.	8th	
1992–93	6	1ª Reg.	2nd	
1993–94	5	Reg. Pref.	2nd	
1994–95	5	Reg. Pref.	3rd	

Season	Tier	Division	Place	Copa del Rey
1995–96	5	Reg. Pref.	8th	
1996–97	5	Reg. Pref.	12th	
1997–98	5	Reg. Pref.	5th	
1998–99	5	Reg. Pref.	4th	
1999–2000	5	Reg. Pref.	10th	
2000–01	5	Reg. Pref.	12th	
2001–02	5	Reg. Pref.	18th	
2002–03	6	1ª Reg.	6th	
2003–04	6	1ª Reg.	2nd	
2004–05	5	Reg. Pref.	18th	
2005–06	6	1ª Reg.	11th	
2006–07	6	1ª Reg.	4th	
2007–08	6	1ª Reg.	3rd	
2008–09	6	1ª Reg.	5th	
2009–10	6	1ª Reg.	5th	
2010–11	6	1ª Reg.	4th	
2011–12	6	1ª Reg.	1st	
2012–13	5	Reg. Pref.	15th	
2013–14	6	1ª Reg.	3rd	
2014–15	6	1ª Reg.	1st	

Season	Tier	Division	Place	Copa del Rey
2015–16	5	Reg. Pref.	3rd	
2016–17	4	3ª	11th	
2017–18	4	3ª	14th	
2018–19	4	3ª	12th	
2019–20	4	3ª	19th	
2020–21	4	3ª	5th / 2nd	
2021–22	5	3ª RFEF	12th	
2022–23	5	3ª Fed.	15th	
2023–24	5	3ª Fed.	18th	
2024–25	6	Lliga Com.	12th	
2025–26	6	Lliga Com.	8th	
2026–27	6	Lliga Com.		

- 5 seasons in Tercera División
- 3 seasons in Tercera Federación/Tercera División RFEF
