= CD Benicarló =

Spanish football team

Benicarló
- Full name: Club Deportivo Benicarló
- Founded: 1921; 105 years ago
- Ground: Ángel Pichi Alonso, Benicarló, Valencian Community, Spain
- Capacity: 2,000
- President: Junta Gestora (Board)
- Head coach: Juan Antonio Morilla
- League: Primera FFCV – Group 1
- 2024–25: Primera FFCV – Group 1, 3rd of 16
- Website: https://www.clubdeportivobenicarlo.es/
Home colours	Away colours

Club Deportivo Benicarló, commonly referred to as Benicarló, is a Spanish football team based in Benicarló in the autonomous Valencian Community. Founded in 1921, it plays in Primera FFCV – Group 1, holding home games at Estadio Ángel "Pichi" Alonso, with a capacity of 2,000 people.

== History ==
Founded in 1921, Benicarló first reached the Tercera División in 1965, and played five consecutive seasons in the category before suffering relegation. After fluctuating between Tercera and the Regional Preferente, the club suffered relegation to the Primera Regional in 2010.

In 2012, Benicarló merged with neighbouring CF Sporting Benicarló, regaining their Preferente place. They returned to Tercera División after 29 years in 2020, but immediately suffered relegation.

== Season to season ==
Season	Tier	Division	Place	Copa del Rey
1921–1954	—	Regional	—	
1954–55	6	3ª Reg.	1st	
1955–56	5	2ª Reg.	7th	
1956–57	5	2ª Reg.	2nd	
1957–58	5	2ª Reg.	1st	
1958–59	4	1ª Reg.	12th	
1959–60	4	1ª Reg.	7th	
1960–61	4	1ª Reg.	14th	
1961–62	4	1ª Reg.	13th	
1962–63	4	1ª Reg.	3rd	
1963–64	4	1ª Reg.	4th	
1964–65	4	1ª Reg.	2nd	
1965–66	3	3ª	15th	
1966–67	3	3ª	6th	
1967–68	3	3ª	9th	
1968–69	3	3ª	11th	
1969–70	3	3ª	9th	First round
1970–71	4	Reg. Pref.	1st	
1971–72	3	3ª	18th	First round
1972–73	4	Reg. Pref.	3rd	

Season	Tier	Division	Place	Copa del Rey
1973–74	4	Reg. Pref.	3rd	
1974–75	4	Reg. Pref.	9th	
1975–76	4	Reg. Pref.	7th	
1976–77	4	Reg. Pref.	6th	
1977–78	5	Reg. Pref.	12th	
1978–79	6	1ª Reg.	2nd	
1979–80	5	Reg. Pref.	15th	
1980–81	5	Reg. Pref.	1st	
1981–82	4	3ª	9th	
1982–83	4	3ª	15th	
1983–84	4	3ª	17th	
1984–85	4	3ª	15th	
1985–86	4	3ª	17th	
1986–87	4	3ª	17th	
1987–88	4	3ª	18th	
1988–89	4	3ª	22nd	
1989–90	5	Reg. Pref.	3rd	
1990–91	5	Reg. Pref.	9th	
1991–92	5	Reg. Pref.	1st	
1992–93	4	3ª	16th	

Season	Tier	Division	Place	Copa del Rey
1993–94	5	Reg. Pref.	4th	
1994–95	5	Reg. Pref.	5th	
1995–96	5	Reg. Pref.	3rd	
1996–97	5	Reg. Pref.	6th	
1997–98	5	Reg. Pref.	7th	
1998–99	5	Reg. Pref.	8th	
1999–2000	5	Reg. Pref.	16th	
2000–01	6	1ª Reg.	1st	
2001–02	5	Reg. Pref.	10th	
2002–03	5	Reg. Pref.	18th	
2003–04	6	1ª Reg.	2nd	
2004–05	5	Reg. Pref.	8th	
2005–06	5	Reg. Pref.	9th	
2006–07	5	Reg. Pref.	14th	
2007–08	5	Reg. Pref.	9th	
2008–09	5	Reg. Pref.	15th	
2009–10	5	Reg. Pref.	17th	
2010–11	6	1ª Reg.	3rd	
2011–12	6	1ª Reg.	9th	
2012–13	5	Reg. Pref.	7th	

Season	Tier	Division	Place	Copa del Rey
2013–14	5	Reg. Pref.	10th	
2014–15	5	Reg. Pref.	8th	
2015–16	5	Reg. Pref.	11th	
2016–17	5	Reg. Pref.	9th	
2017–18	5	Reg. Pref.	11th	
2018–19	5	Reg. Pref.	11th	
2019–20	5	Reg. Pref.	1st	
2020–21	4	3ª	7th / 7th	
2021–22	6	Reg. Pref.	14th	
2022–23	7	1ª Reg.	1st	
2023–24	7	1ª FFCV	4th	
2024–25	7	1ª FFCV	3rd	
2025–26	7	1ª FFCV	7th	
2026–27	7	1ª FFCV		

16 seasons in Tercera División

== Notable players ==
- (Spain) Juan Ignacio Martínez
