= Crevillente Deportivo =

Crevillente
- Full name: Crevillente Deportivo
- Founded: 1967
- Ground: Enrique Miralles, Crevillent, Valencia, Spain
- Capacity: 3,500
- Chairman: José Antonio Lledó
- Manager: José Manuel Mas
- League: Tercera Federación – Group 6
- 2025–26: Tercera Federación – Group 6, 13th of 18
Home colours	Away colours

Crevillente Deportivo is a Spanish football team based in Crevillent, in the autonomous community of Valencia. Founded in 1967, it plays in Tercera Federación – Group 6, holding home games at Estadio Municipal Enrique Miralles, which has a capacity of 3,500 spectators.

== Season to season ==
Season	Tier	Division	Place	Copa del Rey
1967–68	4	1ª Reg.	1st	
1968–69	4	1ª Reg.	2nd	
1969–70	4	1ª Reg.	3rd	
1970–71	4	1ª Reg.	8th	
1971–72	4	Reg. Pref.	7th	
1972–73	4	Reg. Pref.	10th	
1973–74	4	Reg. Pref.	9th	
1974–75	4	Reg. Pref.	11th	
1975–76	4	Reg. Pref.	9th	
1976–77	4	Reg. Pref.	3rd	
1977–78	4	3ª	5th	First round
1978–79	4	3ª	15th	Third round
1979–80	4	3ª	8th	Second round
1980–81	4	3ª	19th	First round
1981–82	5	Reg. Pref.	14th	
1982–83	5	Reg. Pref.	20th	
1983–84	6	1ª Reg.	10th	
1984–85	6	1ª Reg.	5th	
1985–86	6	1ª Reg.	9th	
1986–87	6	1ª Reg.	4th	

Season	Tier	Division	Place	Copa del Rey
1987–88	5	Reg. Pref.	6th	
1988–89	5	Reg. Pref.	7th	
1989–90	5	Reg. Pref.	8th	
1990–91	5	Reg. Pref.	8th	
1991–92	5	Reg. Pref.	2nd	
1992–93	4	3ª	2nd	
1993–94	4	3ª	3rd	Second round
1994–95	4	3ª	15th	
1995–96	4	3ª	14th	
1996–97	4	3ª	20th	
1997–98	5	Reg. Pref.	12th	
1998–99	5	Reg. Pref.	7th	
1999–2000	5	Reg. Pref.	3rd	
2000–01	5	Reg. Pref.	8th	
2001–02	5	Reg. Pref.	6th	
2002–03	5	Reg. Pref.	4th	
2003–04	5	Reg. Pref.	8th	
2004–05	5	Reg. Pref.	5th	
2005–06	5	Reg. Pref.	2nd	
2006–07	4	3ª	11th	

Season	Tier	Division	Place	Copa del Rey
2007–08	4	3ª	13th	
2008–09	4	3ª	16th	
2009–10	4	3ª	11th	
2010–11	4	3ª	7th	
2011–12	4	3ª	16th	
2012–13	4	3ª	19th	
2013–14	5	Reg. Pref.	2nd	
2014–15	4	3ª	8th	
2015–16	4	3ª	12th	
2016–17	4	3ª	10th	
2017–18	4	3ª	12th	
2018–19	4	3ª	5th	
2019–20	4	3ª	13th	
2020–21	4	3ª	6th / 6th	
2021–22	6	Reg. Pref.	1st	
2022–23	6	Reg. Pref.	3rd	
2023–24	6	Lliga Com.	2nd	
2024–25	5	3ª Fed.	14th	
2025–26	5	3ª Fed.	13th	
2026–27	5	3ª Fed.		

- 23 seasons in Tercera División
- 3 seasons in Tercera Federación
