= CD Utiel =

Spanish football club

Utiel
- Full name: Club Deportivo Utiel
- Founded: 1945
- Ground: La Celadilla, Utiel, Valencian Community, Spain
- Capacity: 2,000
- Chairman: Ovidio Palomares
- Manager: Toni López
- League: Tercera Federación – Group 6
- 2025–26: Tercera Federación – Group 6, 16th of 18
Home colours	Away colours

Club Deportivo Utiel is a football team based in Utiel in the autonomous community of Valencian Community. Founded in 1945, the team plays in Tercera Federación – Group 6. The club's home ground is La Celadilla, which has a capacity of 2,000 spectators.

== Season to season ==
Season	Tier	Division	Place	Copa del Rey
1945–46	5	2ª Reg.		
1946–47	5	2ª Reg.	1st	
1947–48	4	1ª Reg.	2nd	
1948–49	4	1ª Reg.	5th	
1949–50	4	1ª Reg.	14th	
1950–51	4	1ª Reg.	11th	
1951–52	4	1ª Reg.	9th	
1952–53	4	1ª Reg.	11th	
1953–54	4	1ª Reg.	17th	
1954–55	4	1ª Reg.	9th	
1955–56	4	1ª Reg.	2nd	
1956–57	3	3ª	13th	
1957–58	4	1ª Reg.	12th	
1958–59	4	1ª Reg.	8th	
1959–60	4	1ª Reg.	6th	
1960–61	4	1ª Reg.	4th	
1961–62	4	1ª Reg.	9th	
1962–63	4	1ª Reg.	16th	
1963–64	4	1ª Reg.	9th	
1964–65	4	1ª Reg.	10th	

Season	Tier	Division	Place	Copa del Rey
1965–66	4	1ª Reg.	19th	
1966–67	4	1ª Reg.	6th	
1967–68	4	1ª Reg.	12th	
1968–69	5	2ª Reg.	2nd	
1969–70	5	2ª Reg.	4th	
1970–71	5	1ª Reg.	7th	
1971–72	5	1ª Reg.	4th	
1972–73	5	1ª Reg.	7th	
1973–74	5	1ª Reg.	12th	
1974–75	5	1ª Reg.	10th	
1975–76	5	1ª Reg.	18th	
1976–77	5	1ª Reg.	15th	
1977–78	6	1ª Reg.	16th	
1978–79	6	1ª Reg.	6th	
1979–80	6	1ª Reg.	3rd	
1980–81	6	1ª Reg.	6th	
1981–82	6	1ª Reg.	11th	
1982–83	6	1ª Reg.	2nd	
1983–84	6	1ª Reg.	13th	
1984–85	6	1ª Reg.	3rd	

Season	Tier	Division	Place	Copa del Rey
1985–86	6	1ª Reg.	2nd	
1986–87	5	Reg. Pref.	13th	
1987–88	5	Reg. Pref.	17th	
1988–89	6	1ª Reg.	2nd	
1989–90	5	Reg. Pref.	4th	
1990–91	5	Reg. Pref.	8th	
1991–92	5	Reg. Pref.	5th	
1992–93	5	Reg. Pref.	1st	
1993–94	4	3ª	10th	
1994–95	4	3ª	5th	
1995–96	4	3ª	12th	
1996–97	4	3ª	15th	
1997–98	4	3ª	15th	
1998–99	4	3ª	10th	
1999–2000	5	Reg. Pref.	3rd	
2000–01	5	Reg. Pref.	1st	
2001–02	5	Reg. Pref.	4th	
2002–03	5	Reg. Pref.	2nd	
2003–04	5	Reg. Pref.	3rd	
2004–05	5	Reg. Pref.	1st	

Season	Tier	Division	Place	Copa del Rey
2005–06	5	Reg. Pref.	3rd	
2006–07	5	Reg. Pref.	2nd	
2007–08	4	3ª	13th	
2008–09	4	3ª	20th	
2009–10	5	Reg. Pref.	6th	
2010–11	5	Reg. Pref.	3rd	
2011–12	5	Reg. Pref.	1st	
2012–13	4	3ª	9th	
2013–14	4	3ª	17th	
2014–15	4	3ª	21st	
2015–16	5	Reg. Pref.	2nd	
2016–17	5	Reg. Pref.	9th	
2017–18	5	Reg. Pref.	4th	
2018–19	5	Reg. Pref.	3rd	
2019–20	5	Reg. Pref.	4th	
2020–21	5	Reg. Pref.	2nd	
2021–22	6	Reg. Pref.	4th	
2022–23	6	Reg. Pref.	1st	
2023–24	5	3ª Fed.	5th	
2024–25	5	3ª Fed.	5th	

Season	Tier	Division	Place	Copa del Rey
2025–26	5	3ª Fed.	16th	
2026–27	5	3ª Fed.		

- 12 seasons in Tercera División
- 4 seasons in Tercera Federación
