= CD Dénia =

Spanish football team

Dénia
- Full name: Club Deportivo Dénia
- Nickname: Griegos
- Founded: 3 August 1953; 72 years ago
- Ground: Diego Mena Cuesta, Dénia, Valencia, Spain
- Capacity: 3,000
- President: (Spain) Gema Estrela
- Head coach: (Spain) Juan Carlos Signes
- League: Primera FFCV – Group 3
- 2024–25: Lliga Comunitat – South, 15th of 16 (relegated)
Home colours	Away colours

Club Deportivo Dénia is a Spanish football team based in Dénia, in the autonomous community of Valencia. Founded in 1953 it plays in Primera FFCV – Group 3, holding home games at Estadio Diego Mena Cuesta, with a capacity of 3,050 seats.

== History ==
In the 2007–08 season, Dénia made its debuts in the third division, ranking in a comfortable 12th place. On 1 July 2012, even though the club finished 15th, outside of the relegation zone, it was relegated to the fourth level by the Royal Spanish Football Federation for failing to pay the €200,000 deposit which was needed to compete in the former category.

== Season to season ==
Season	Tier	Division	Place	Copa del Rey
1953–54	5	2ª Reg.		
1954–55	5	2ª Reg.		
1955–56	5	2ª Reg.		
1956–57	5	2ª Reg.	7th	
1957–58	5	2ª Reg.		
1958–59	5	2ª Reg.		
1959–60	5	2ª Reg.	2nd	
1960–61	4	1ª Reg.	13th	
1961–62	4	1ª Reg.	3rd	
1962–63	4	1ª Reg.	7th	
1963–64	4	1ª Reg.	3rd	
1964–65	4	1ª Reg.	5th	
1965–66	4	1ª Reg.	8th	
1966–67	4	1ª Reg.	3rd	
1967–68	4	1ª Reg.	10th	
1968–69	4	1ª Reg.	11th	
1969–70	4	1ª Reg.	9th	
1970–71	4	Reg. Pref.	9th	
1971–72	4	Reg. Pref.	7th	
1972–73	4	Reg. Pref.	10th	

Season	Tier	Division	Place	Copa del Rey
1973–74	4	Reg. Pref.	8th	
1974–75	4	Reg. Pref.	6th	
1975–76	4	Reg. Pref.	10th	
1976–77	4	Reg. Pref.	11th	
1977–78	5	Reg. Pref.	4th	
1978–79	5	Reg. Pref.	14th	
1979–80	5	Reg. Pref.	3rd	
1980–81	4	3ª	3rd	
1981–82	4	3ª	10th	Second round
1982–83	4	3ª	18th	
1983–84	5	Reg. Pref.	4th	
1984–85	4	3ª	20th	
1985–86	5	Reg. Pref.	5th	
1986–87	5	Reg. Pref.	3rd	
1987–88	4	3ª	14th	
1988–89	4	3ª	15th	
1989–90	4	3ª	6th	
1990–91	4	3ª	2nd	
1991–92	4	3ª	17th	First round
1992–93	5	Reg. Pref.	9th	

Season	Tier	Division	Place	Copa del Rey
1993–94	5	Reg. Pref.	8th	
1994–95	5	Reg. Pref.	6th	
1995–96	5	Reg. Pref.	6th	
1996–97	5	Reg. Pref.	4th	
1997–98	5	Reg. Pref.	1st	
1998–99	4	3ª	13th	
1999–2000	4	3ª	9th	
2000–01	4	3ª	18th	
2001–02	5	Reg. Pref.	1st	
2002–03	4	3ª	15th	
2003–04	4	3ª	10th	
2004–05	4	3ª	8th	
2005–06	4	3ª	4th	
2006–07	4	3ª	1st	
2007–08	3	2ª B	12th	Round of 32
2008–09	3	2ª B	15th	
2009–10	3	2ª B	5th	
2010–11	3	2ª B	8th	First round
2011–12	3	2ª B	15th	
2012–13	4	3ª	20th	

Season	Tier	Division	Place	Copa del Rey
2013–14	5	Reg. Pref.	4th	
2014–15	5	Reg. Pref.	5th	
2015–16	5	Reg. Pref.	2nd	
2016–17	5	Reg. Pref.	5th	
2017–18	5	Reg. Pref.	3rd	
2018–19	5	Reg. Pref.	1st	
2019–20	5	Reg. Pref.	9th	
2020–21	5	Reg. Pref.	5th	
2021–22	6	Reg. Pref.	8th	
2022–23	6	Reg. Pref.	7th	
2023–24	6	Lliga Com.	10th	
2024–25	6	Lliga Com.	15th	
2025–26	7	1ª FFCV	3rd	
2026–27	7	1ª FFCV		

- 5 seasons in Segunda División B
- 17 seasons in Tercera División

== Famous players ==
- (Spain) Juande Ramos
- (Spain) Migue
