= Santa Pola CF =

Santa Pola
- Full name: Santa Pola Club de Fútbol
- Founded: 1979
- Ground: Municipal Manolo Maciá, Santa Pola, Valencian Community, Spain
- Capacity: 3,000
- Chairman: Antonio Pomares
- Manager: Antonio Ruvira
- League: Primera FFCV – Group 4
- 2024–25: Primera FFCV – Group 4, 3rd of 16
Home colours	Away colours

Santa Pola Club de Fútbol is a football team based in Santa Pola in the autonomous community of Valencian Community. Founded in 1979, it plays in the Primera FFCV – Group 4. Its stadium is Municipal Manolo Maciá.

== History ==
U.D. Santa Pola (1968) & Atlético Santa Pola (1976) merged in 1979 as Santa Pola CF.

== Season to season ==
Season	Tier	Division	Place	Copa del Rey
1979–80	6	1ª Reg.	19th	
1980–81	6	1ª Reg.	9th	
1981–82	6	1ª Reg.	10th	
1982–83	6	1ª Reg.	6th	
1983–84	6	1ª Reg.	4th	
1984–85	6	1ª Reg.	2nd	
1985–86	6	1ª Reg.	4th	
1986–87	6	1ª Reg.	3rd	
1987–88	5	Reg. Pref.	15th	
1988–89	5	Reg. Pref.	13th	
1989–90	5	Reg. Pref.	13th	
1990–91	5	Reg. Pref.	6th	
1991–92	5	Reg. Pref.	6th	
1992–93	5	Reg. Pref.	7th	
1993–94	5	Reg. Pref.	5th	
1994–95	5	Reg. Pref.	5th	
1995–96	5	Reg. Pref.	5th	
1996–97	5	Reg. Pref.	2nd	
1997–98	4	3ª	15th	
1998–99	4	3ª	17th	

Season	Tier	Division	Place	Copa del Rey
1999–2000	4	3ª	10th	
2000–01	4	3ª	7th	
2001–02	4	3ª	14th	
2002–03	4	3ª	6th	
2003–04	4	3ª	9th	
2004–05	4	3ª	4th	
2005–06	4	3ª	22nd	
2006–07	5	Reg. Pref.	5th	
2007–08	5	Reg. Pref.	8th	
2008–09	5	Reg. Pref.	14th	
2009–10	5	Reg. Pref.	6th	
2010–11	5	Reg. Pref.	5th	
2011–12	5	Reg. Pref.	4th	
2012–13	5	Reg. Pref.	7th	
2013–14	5	Reg. Pref.	12th	
2014–15	5	Reg. Pref.	18th	
2015–16	6	1ª Reg.	10th	
2016–17	6	1ª Reg.	4th	
2017–18	6	1ª Reg.	3rd	
2018–19	6	1ª Reg.	4th	

Season	Tier	Division	Place	Copa del Rey
2019–20	6	1ª Reg.	1st	
2020–21	5	Reg. Pref.	10th	
2021–22	6	Reg. Pref.	6th	
2022–23	6	Reg. Pref.	8th	
2023–24	6	Lliga Com.	14th	
2024–25	7	1ª FFCV	3rd	
2025–26	7	1ª FFCV	1st	
2026–27	6	Lliga Com.		

- 9 seasons in Tercera División

== Notable former players ==
- (Spain) Manolo Maciá

== Notable former coaches ==
- (Spain) Uge Sánchez
- (Spain) Manolo Maciá
