= CD Torrevieja =

Spanish football team (1993–2020)

Torrevieja
- Full name: Club Deportivo Torrevieja
- Founded: 1993
- Dissolved: 2020
- Ground: Vicente García, Torrevieja, Valencia, Spain
- Capacity: 6,000
- 2019–20: Primera Regional, 11th
Home colours	Away colours

Club Deportivo Torrevieja was a Spanish football team based in Torrevieja, in the autonomous community of Valencia. Founded in 1993 and dissolved in 2020, they played 14 seasons in Tercera División, and held home games at Estadio Vicente García, with a capacity of 5,000 seats.

== History ==
In Torrevieja, football started to become popular during the time of the World War I. The first official ground was inaugurated in 1920, near the town's bus station, with a statue of a footballer being erected in the small plaza behind it in later years.

The first reference to Torrevieja CF is in 1923 and, although there was no official league for the team to play in, friendlies and summer cup competitions were arranged against other teams in the Vega Baja del Segura region. During the Spanish Civil War football came to a standstill, and it was not until the mid-1950s that Torrevieja again had an official team, with both Español Frente de Juventudes (known as el Hueso) and Club Deportivo Torrevejense (known as el Remiendo) being formed, with the peculiarity that no admission was charged, with fans making whatever contribution they could.

Over the next 15 years, both of the clubs folded, leaving a void which was filled in 1971 with the foundation of Torrevieja Club de Fútbol. The town's mayor, Vicente García García, and his administration, took on the task of building the football ground, which was named after the politician, being inaugurated with a match with neighbouring Hércules CF.

In 1978, Torrevieja reached the fourth division–the first national category–for the first time, competing in that level for ten years after which it promoted again, now to the third level, a spell that ended in the 1992–93 campaign, with the club suffering another relegation in 1994 due to financial irregularities.

A new football club was set up in the town in 1993, Club Deportivo Torrevieja, which started playing in the second regional league. By 1996, the new side was promoted to the competition's top level, as the original club dropped to the second, and was also renamed Fútbol Club Torrevieja, promoted to division four in 1997, but being relegated two seasons after.

In the 2002–03 season, Restituto Marroquí was elected as club president by the local council (Torrevieja was a municipal club owned by the city council). The new manager was Croatian Vlado Macan, who achieved a mid-table finish with a squad made up of young local players. In January 2003, at a meeting in the “Total Football Bar” owned by founder member Rob Palmer in the Urbanización San Luis, a group of mainly British fans met and agreed to set up a supporters' club. This group had been following the team all season (both home and away matches) and had helped to increase crowds at the ground from 100 or so to 5000. The name chosen was “The Torry Army”, and the first president was Eduardo "Eddie" Cagigao.

In 2005, new manager Riquelme (formerly of Novelda CF and Jumilla CF), in charge since the previous year, led Torrevieja to a third-division return. Subsequently, the team turned professional for the first time, but the manager was sacked before Christmas, after a 0–1 home loss against CD Castellón B; the side eventually finished in mid-table.

In two of the following four seasons, Torrevieja appeared twice in the third division promotion playoffs, falling in 2007 against UD Fuerteventura (after disposing of Utebo FC) and in 2009 against Haro Deportivo (1–2 on aggregate).

Following approval by the socios, starting in the 2014–15 season, the club reverts to its original name–Club Deportivo Torrevieja. On 29 September 2020, the club announced that would not play in any competition,

== Season to season ==
Season	Tier	Division	Place	Copa del Rey
1993–94	7	2ª Reg.	1st	
1994–95	6	1ª Reg.	1st	
1995–96	5	Reg. Pref.	2nd	
1996–97	5	Reg. Pref.	1st	
1997–98	4	3ª	16th	
1998–99	4	3ª	20th	
1999–2000	5	Reg. Pref.	11th	
2000–01	5	Reg. Pref.	4th	
2001–02	5	Reg. Pref.	3rd	
2002–03	5	Reg. Pref.	10th	
2003–04	5	Reg. Pref.	2nd	
2004–05	5	Reg. Pref.	2nd	
2005–06	4	3ª	12th	
2006–07	4	3ª	3rd	

Season	Tier	Division	Place	Copa del Rey
2007–08	4	3ª	15th	
2008–09	4	3ª	4th	
2009–10	4	3ª	15th	
2010–11	4	3ª	16th	
2011–12	4	3ª	7th	
2012–13	4	3ª	12th	
2013–14	4	3ª	9th	
2014–15	4	3ª	10th	
2015–16	4	3ª	11th	
2016–17	4	3ª	19th	
2017–18	5	Reg. Pref.	14th	
2018–19	5	Reg. Pref.	18th	
2019–20	6	1ª Reg.	11th	

- 14 seasons in Tercera División

== Famous players ==
- (Equatorial Guinea) Rubén Belima
- (France) Alex Ricard
