= Divisiones Regionales de Fútbol in the Valencian Community =

The Divisiones Regionales de Fútbol in the Valencian Community, are organized by the Valencian Football Federation (FFCV):

- Lliga Comunitat (Level 6 of the Spanish football pyramid – starting from the 2023–24 season)
- Primera FFCV (former Regional Preferente – Level 7)
- Segona FFCV (former Primera Regional – Level 8)
- Tercera FFCV (former Segunda Regional – Level 9)

== Lliga Comunitat ==
Lliga Comunitat
- Founded: 1970
- Country: Spain
- Number of clubs: 72; 4 groups of 18
- Level on pyramid: 6
- Promotion to: 3ª RFEF – Group 6
- Relegation to: Primera FFCV
- Domestic cup: None
- Website: Official website

The Lliga Comunitat FFCV is one of the lower levels of the Spanish Football League. It is held every year. It stands at the sixth level of Spanish football with teams five promotions away from the top division. Teams from this league progress into the Tercera División RFEF Group 6. The participating teams are based in the Valencian Community.

=== Until 2023/24 ===
From 1970 until the 2022/2023 the league was called the Regional Preferente de la Comunitat Valenciana. It consisted of four regional groups of 18 teams each. Group 1 consisted of teams in the province of Castellon and the northern part of Valencia province, Group 2 teams in the city of Valencia and surrounding satellite towns, Group 3 teams in the south of Valencia province and north of Alicante province and Group 4 teams the rest of Alicante province. During the COVID-19 pandemic the number of groups were increased to six for the 2020/21 season and five for the 2021/22 season.

==== Promotion & Relegation ====
- The top three teams of each group advanced to the promotional playoffs. The twelve teams were paired into four playoff groups. The six winners were drawn into three more groups with the three winners being promoted to Tercera División RFEF – Group 6. The bottom three teams (16th-18th) in each group were relegated to the Primera Regional de la Comunitat Valenciana, which consisted of eight regional groups.

=== Changes for 2023/24 ===
In October 2022 the FFCV agreed to create a new 6th level, called Lliga Comunitat FFCV, to better bridge the gap between the Regional Preferente and Tercera Federación consisting of two groups of 16 teams to begin for the 2023/24 season, split on a north/south basis.

The winner of each Lliga Comunitat FFCV group is promoted to Tercera Federación, with the winner of a play-off between the 2nd and 3rd placed teams also promoted. The bottom three teams in each group are relegated. The 7th level Primera FFCV consists of 4 groups, the 8th level Segona FFCV of 8 groups and the 9th (lowest) level Tercera FFCV of 15 groups. Each division at every level has 16 teams, a reduction from the previous 18 that some contained, to reduce administration costs. The bottom three teams from each Primera FFCV and Segona FFCV group are relegated and replaced by the champions of the groups in the level below and the winner of play-offs involving the second placed teams.

=== 2026–27 season teams ===
Group North	Group South
CD L'Alcora; UD Aldaia^{↑}; CD Almazora; Alqueries CF; CF Atlètic Quart de les Valls; CD Burriana; Manises CF; Massanassa CF^{↑}; CF Nou Jove Castelló; Odisea FC^{↑}; CD Onda; Paiporta CF; CF Recambios Colón^{↓}; Ribarroja CF; Silla CF; CD Utiel^{↓}	CE Alberic; CFI Alicante; CD Almoradí^{↑}; UD Alzira^{↓}; CF Benidorm; Benigànim CF; CF UD Calpe; CF Gandia^{↑}; CD Jávea; Novelda Unión; CD Olímpic de Xàtiva; UD Rayo Ibense; FB Redován CF; Santa Pola CF^{↑}; CF UE Tavernes de la Valldigna^{*}; CD Tháder

^{↓}Relegated from 2025-26 Tercera RFEF
^{↑}Promoted from 2025-26 Lliga Primera FFCV
^{*}Transferred from Group North to Group South

=== Champions ===
Regional Preferente de la Comunitat Valenciana
Season	Gr. I	Gr. II	Gr. III	Gr. IV
2015–16	Segorbe	Torrent	Tavernes	La Nucía
2016–17	Onda	Paiporta	Atzeneta	Villajoyosa
2017–18	Acero	Vilamarxant	Atzeneta	Jove Español
2018–19	Puçol	Recambios Colón	Dénia	Intercity Sant Joan
2019–20	Benicarló	Buñol	Castellonense	Villajoyosa
Season / Gr. I / Gr. II / Gr. III / Gr. IV / Gr. V / Gr. VI; 2020–21 / Castellón B / Rayo Llíria CF / Buñol / Castellonense / CFI Alicante / Callosa Deportiva
Season / Gr. I / Gr. II / Gr. III / Gr. IV / Gr. V; 2021–22 / Vall de Uxó / Patacona / Aldaia / Gandía / Crevillente Deportivo
Season	Gr. I	Gr. II	Gr. III	Gr. IV
2022–23	Soneja	Utiel	Ontinyent 1931	Callosa Deportiva
Lliga Comunitat
Season	Grupo Nord (Group North)		Grupo Sud (Group South)	
2023–24	UD Vall de Uxó		CF Benidorm	
2024–25	CD Buñol		Hércules CF B	
2025–26	CD Acero		CD Eldense B	

== Primera FFCV ==
Primera FFCV
- Founded: 2023
- Country: Spain
- Number of clubs: 64; 4 groups of 16
- Level on pyramid: 7
- Promotion to: Lliga Comunitat
- Relegation to: Segona FFCV
- Domestic cup: None
- Website: Official website

Primera FFCV (formerly Primera Regional) is the seventh level of competition of the Spanish Football League in the Valencian Community. Since the 2023/24 season, it has been played in 4 regional groups of 16 teams each. At the end of the season, the champions and four winners of playoffs are promoted. Four clubs from each group are relegated to Segunda Regional.

== Segona FFCV ==
Segona FFCV
- Founded: Unknown
- Country: Spain
- Number of clubs: 128; 8 groups
- Level on pyramid: 8
- Promotion to: Primera FFCV
- Relegation to: Tercera FFCV
- Domestic cup: None
- Website: Official website

Segona FFCV (formerly Segunda Regional) is the eighth level of competition of the Spanish Football League in the Valencian Community. It is played with 8 groups of 16 clubs. At the end of the season, the champions and the 4 winners of play-offs between the runners-up are promoted.

== Tercera FFCV ==
Tercera FFCV
- Country: Spain
- Level on pyramid: 9
- Promotion to: Segona FFCV
- Domestic cup: None
- Website: Official website

Tercera FFCV (formerly Tercera Regional) is the ninth level of competition of the Spanish Football League in the Valencian Community. It is played with 15 groups of 15 or 16 clubs. At the end of the season, the champions, the best second-placed team and the 8 winners of play-offs between the other runners-up are promoted.
