= 2012 Tercera División play-offs =

Spanish football play-offs

The 2012 Tercera División play-offs to Segunda División B from Tercera División (Promotion play-offs) were the final playoffs for the promotion from 2011 to 2012 Tercera División to 2012–13 Segunda División B. The first four teams in each group (excluding reserve teams) took part in the play-off.

== Format ==
The eighteen group winners have the opportunity to be promoted directly to Segunda División B. The eighteen group winners were drawn into a two-legged series where the nine winners will promote to Segunda División B. The nine losing clubs will enter the play-off round for the last nine promotion spots.

The eighteen runners-up were drawn against one of the seventeen fourth-placed clubs outside their group and the eighteen third-placed clubs were drawn against one another in a two-legged series. The twenty-seven winners will advance with the nine losing clubs from the champions' series to determine the eighteen teams that will enter the last two-legged series for the last nine promotion spots. In all the playoff series, the lower-ranked club play at home first. Whenever there is a tie in position (e.g. like the group winners in the champions' series or the third-placed teams in the first round), a draw determines the club to play at home first.

== Group Winners promotion play-off ==
=== Qualified teams ===
The draw took place in the RFEF headquarters, in Las Rozas (Madrid), on 14 May 2012, 17:00 CEST.

Group	Team
1	Ourense
2	Caudal
3	Noja
4	Laudio
5	AE Prat
6	Catarroja
7	Fuenlabrada
8	Real Valladolid B
9	Loja

Group	Team
10	Atlético Sanluqueño
11	Constància
12	Marino
13	Yeclano
14	Arroyo
15	Peña Sport
16	SD Logroñés
17	Ejea
18	Villarrobledo

=== Matches ===
Team 1	Agg.	Team 2	1st leg	2nd leg
Real Valladolid B	1–3	Loja	1–0	0–3
Villarrobledo	1–2	Constància	0–0	1–2
Yeclano	0–3	Caudal	0–0	0–3 (aet)
Ejea	2–2 (a)	Arroyo	1–2	1–0
Atlético Sanluqueño	0–2	Prat	0–0	0–2
Fuenlabrada	2–4	Marino	1–2	1–2
SD Logroñés	4–3	Peña Sport	4–0	0–3
Laudio	1–4	Ourense	1–3	0–1
Catarroja	0–4	Noja	0–2	0–2

The aggregate winners will be promoted to Segunda División B. The aggregate losers were relegated to the Non-champions promotion play-off Second Round.

==== First leg ====
19 May 2012	Laudio	1 – 3	Ourense	Laudio/Llodio (Álava)
18:00 CEST	Antón 79'	Report	Éder 42', 55'; Sanginés 70'	Stadium: Ellakuri; Attendance: 1,500; Referee: Carlos Álvarez Fernández

20 May 2012	Fuenlabrada	1 – 2	Marino	Fuenlabrada (Madrid)
12:00 CEST	Pachón 37'	Report	Balduino 27' (pen.); Maikel 58' (pen.)	Stadium: Fernando Torres; Attendance: 1,500; Referee: Jesús Fernández Felipe

20 May 2012	Real Valladolid B	1 – 0	Loja	Valladolid
12:00 CEST	Javi Navas 27'	Report		Stadium: Anexos José Zorrilla; Attendance: 1,500; Referee: Aitor Cid Puga

20 May 2012	Villarrobledo	0 – 0	Constància	Villarrobledo (Albacete)
12:00 CEST		Report		Stadium: Nuestra Señora de la Caridad; Attendance: 3,500; Referee: Eduardo Moya Baena

20 May 2012	SD Logroñés	4 – 0	Peña Sport	Logroño
18:00 CEST	Herreros 1', 45+1'; Esaúl 19'; Yécora 90+2'	Report		Stadium: Nuevo Las Gaunas; Attendance: 2,500; Referee: César Bosqued Lafita

20 May 2012	Catarroja	0 – 2	Noja	Catarroja (Valencia)
18:00 CEST		Report	Álvaro 12'; Borja 37'	Stadium: Mundial 82; Attendance: 1,500; Referee: Salvador Lax Franco

20 May 2012	Yeclano	0 – 0	Caudal	Yecla (Murcia)
19:30 CEST		Report		Stadium: La Constitución; Attendance: 4,500; Referee: José Antonio Morales Yuste

20 May 2012	Ejea	1 – 2	Arroyo	Ejea de los Caballeros (Zaragoza)
19:30 CEST	Pirri 27'	Report	Valencia 38'; Morán 49'	Stadium: Luchán; Attendance: 3,000; Referee: David Congost Larrosa

20 May 2012	Atlético Sanluqueño	0 – 0	Prat	Sanlúcar de Barrameda (Cádiz)
20:00 CEST		Report		Stadium: El Palmar; Attendance: 4,000; Referee: Juan Pablo Ramos Rodríguez

==== Second leg ====
27 May 2012	Noja	2 – 0 (4 – 0 agg.)	Catarroja	Noja (Cantabria)
11:45 CEST	Lázaro 20', 45'	Report		Stadium: La Caseta; Attendance: 1,200; Referee: Azibar Eléxpuru Sanz

27 May 2012	Constància	2 – 1 (2 – 1 agg.)	Villarrobledo	Inca (Mallorca)
12:00 CEST	Alomar 11'; Ferrer 90+5'	Report	Vílchez 80'	Stadium: Nou Camp; Attendance: 1,000; Referee: Rubén Ávalos Barrera

27 May 2012	Prat	2 – 0 (2 – 0 agg.)	Atlético Sanluqueño	El Prat de Llobregat (Barcelona)
12:00 CEST	Sierra 1', 86'	Report		Stadium: Sagnier; Attendance: 2,500; Referee: Gabriel Flaquer Rey

27 May 2012	Marino	2 – 1 (4 – 2 agg.)	Fuenlabrada	Los Cristianos (Santa Cruz de Tenerife)
13:00 CEST	Noah 9'; Cristo 90+3'	Report	Pulido 67'	Stadium: Antonio Domínguez; Attendance: 3,000; Referee: Manuel de los Santos Mellado

27 May 2012	Ourense	1 – 0 (4 – 1 agg.)	Laudio	Ourense
17:30 CEST	Eder 59'	Report		Stadium: O Couto; Attendance: 5,500; Referee: Oliver de la Fuente Ramos

27 May 2012	Arroyo	0 – 1 (2 – 2 agg.)	Ejea	Arroyo de la Luz (Cáceres)
18:00 CEST		Report	Gallego 62' (pen.)	Stadium: Municipal de Arroyo; Attendance: 2,000; Referee: Francisco Calzada Morales

27 May 2012	Peña Sport	3 – 0 (3 – 4 agg.)	SD Logroñés	Tafalla (Navarre)
18:00 CEST	Galán 34' (pen.); Uriz 67'; Borja 75'	Report		Stadium: San Francisco; Attendance: 1,200; Referee: Carlos Frechoso Beltrán

27 May 2012	Caudal	3 – 0 (a.e.t.) (3 – 0 agg.)	Yeclano	Mieres (Asturias)
19:00 CEST	Nacho Calvillo 92'; Invernón 103'; Nacho Méndez 119'	Report		Stadium: Hermanos Antuña; Attendance: 3,500; Referee: Víctor Manuel García Villaverde

27 May 2012	Loja	3 – 0 (3 – 1 agg.)	Real Valladolid B	Loja (Granada)
21:00 CEST	Álex Bautista 32'; Gato 70', 79'	Report		Stadium: Medina Lauxa; Attendance: 2,500; Referee: Alfonso Ros Gómez

Promoted to Segunda División B
Noja (9 years later)	Constància (24 years later)	Prat (First time ever)	Marino (19 years later)	Ourense (4 years later)	Arroyo (First time ever)	SD Logroñés (First time ever)	Caudal (1 year later)	Loja (First time ever)

== Non-champions promotion play-off ==
=== First round ===
==== Qualified teams ====
The draw took place in the RFEF headquarters, in Las Rozas (Madrid), on 14 May 2012, 17:00 CEST.

Group	Position	Team
1	2nd	Alondras
2	2nd	Real Avilés
3	2nd	Laredo
4	2nd	Barakaldo
5	2nd	RCD Espanyol B
6	2nd	Levante UD B
7	2nd	Real Madrid C
8	2nd	Real Ávila
9	2nd	Unión Estepona
10	2nd	San Fernando
11	2nd	Binissalem
12	2nd	Tenisca
13	2nd	Águilas FC
14	2nd	Díter Zafra
15	2nd	Izarra
16	2nd	Alfaro
17	2nd	Sariñena
18	2nd	Almansa

Group	Position	Team
1	3rd	Cerceda
2	3rd	Langreo
3	3rd	Racing Santander B
4	3rd	Portugalete
5	3rd	Manlleu
6	3rd	Muro
7	3rd	Puerta Bonita
8	3rd	Cultural Leonesa
9	3rd	Marbella
10	3rd	Mairena
11	3rd	Llosetense
12	3rd	Las Palmas Atlético
13	3rd	Mar Menor
14	3rd	Extremadura UD
15	3rd	Tudelano
16	3rd	Haro
17	3rd	Cuarte Industrial
18	3rd	Azuqueca

Group	Position	Team
1	4th	Pontevedra
2	4th	Tuilla
3	4th	Cayón
4	4th	Beasain
5	4th	Pobla de Mafumet
6	4th	Alzira
7	4th	Parla
8	4th	Villaralbo
9	4th	Maracena
10	4th	Coria
11	4th	Montuïri
12	4th	Vera
13	4th	La Hoya
14	4th	Don Benito
15	4th	Mutilvera
16	4th	Varea
17	4th	Utebo
18	4th	Albacete B

==== Matches ====
Team 1	Agg.	Team 2	1st leg	2nd leg
Villaralbo	1–5	Real Madrid C	0–1	1–4
Maracena	1–4	Águilas	0–1	1–3
Utebo	5–6	Izarra	3–2	2–4 (aet)
Coria	2–2 (a)	Real Avilés	0–0	2–2
Albacete B	0–1	Binissalem	0–0	0–1
Pontevedra	0–3	Espanyol B	0–0	0–3
Parla	1–4	Barakaldo	0–2	1–2
Pobla de Mafumet	3–2	Laredo	2–1	1–1
Montuïri	4–2	Alfaro	1–1	3–1 (aet)
Tuilla	3–5	Real Ávila	2–1	1–4
Don Benito	1–2	Unión Estepona	1–1	0–1
Cayón	1–2	Alondras	1–0	0–2
La Hoya	0–0 (4–3 p)	Díter Zafra	0–0	0–0 (aet)
Beasain	4–5	Levante B	3–3	1–2
Alzira	1–2	Sariñena	0–1	1–1
Vera	3–1	Almansa	2–0	1–1
Mutilvera	1–1 (a)	San Fernando	1–1	0–0
Azuqueca	2–3	Tudelano	1–1	1–2
Cultural Leonesa	2–2 (a)	Racing Santander B	2–2	0–0
Llosetense	3–1	Langreo	1–0	2–1
Extremadura UD	2–1	Haro	2–0	0–1
Cuarte Industrial	0–3	Cerceda	0–2	0–1
Mar Menor	1–2	Portugalete	1–1	0–1
Manlleu	4–3	Las Palmas Atlético	2–2	2–1
Puerta Bonita	2–3	Muro	1–1	1–2
Mairena	3–3 (a)	Marbella	3–1	0–2
Varea	1–2	Tenisca	0–1	1–1

===== First leg =====
19 May 2012	Coria	0 – 0	Real Avilés	Coria del Río (Seville)
18:00 CEST		Report		Stadium: Guadalquivir; Attendance: 1,500; Referee: Pedro Morillo Sánchez

19 May 2012	Pobla de Mafumet	2 – 1	Laredo	La Pobla de Mafumet (Tarragona)
18:00 CEST	Casanova 51'; Joel 90'	Report	Juanma 22'	Stadium: Estadio Municipal; Attendance: 350; Referee: Marcos Cote Aragón

19 May 2012	Cayón	1 – 0	Alondras	Sarón (Cantabria)
18:00 CEST	Salcines 26'	Report		Stadium: Fernando Astobiza; Attendance: 1,000; Referee: Xabier Gómez Landazabal

19 May 2012	Puerta Bonita	1 – 1	Muro	Madrid
18:30 CEST	Ónega 58'	Report	Calabuig 24'	Stadium: Antiguo Canódromo; Attendance: 1,200; Referee: Saúl Plaza García

19 May 2012	Mutilvera	1 – 1	San Fernando	Mutilva (Navarre)
18:30 CEST	Briñol 90'	Report	Germán 45'	Stadium: Valle de Aranguren; Attendance: 1,000; Referee: Gonzalo Zubiaur de Velasco

19 May 2012	Utebo	3 – 2	Izarra	Utebo (Zaragoza)
19:00 CEST	Capapé 6'; Pulga Martínez 52'; Néstor 90+2'	Report	Ibai 21'; Eztieder 38'	Stadium: Santa Ana; Attendance: 500; Referee: José María Quintana Carmona

20 May 2012	Llosetense	1 – 0	Langreo	Lloseta (Balearic Islands)
11:00 CEST	Tolo Reus 49'	Report		Stadium: Estadio Municipal; Attendance: 700; Referee: Juan Manuel Martín Varas

20 May 2012	Parla	0 – 2	Barakaldo	Parla (Community of Madrid)
11:30 CEST		Report	Camino 46'; Ariño 60'	Stadium: Los Prados; Attendance: 1,000; Referee: Jorge Ortega Villamiel

20 May 2012	Albacete B	0 – 0	Binissalem	Albacete
11:30 CEST		Report		Stadium: Ciudad Deportiva; Attendance: 600; Referee: Guillermo Cuadra Fernández

20 May 2012	Varea	0 – 1	Tenisca	Varea (La Rioja)
12:00 CEST		Report	Jeffrey	Stadium: Estadio Municipal; Attendance: 500; Referee: José Antonio Delgado López

20 May 2012	Cuarte Industrial	0 – 2	Cerceda	Cuarte de Huerva (Zaragoza)
12:00 CEST		Report	Mariño 28'; Xaco 88'	Stadium: Nuevo Estadio Municipal; Attendance: 350; Referee: Óscar Alcalde Gallardo

20 May 2012	Montuïri	1 – 1	Alfaro	Montuïri (Balearic Islands)
12:00 CEST	Pons 1'	Report	Toledo 87'	Stadium: Es Revolt; Attendance: 500; Referee: Antonio Zornoza Parrés

20 May 2012	Vera	2 – 0	Almansa	Puerto de la Cruz (Tenerife)
13:00 CEST	Cristo 63'; Amray 66'	Report		Stadium: Salvador Ledesma; Attendance: 700; Referee: Sergio Pérez Muley

20 May 2012	Manlleu	2 – 2	Las Palmas Atlético	Manlleu (Barcelona)
17:00 CEST	Aumatell 18'; Dani Planagumà 56'	Report	Néstor 28'; Herrera 79'	Stadium: Estadio Municipal; Attendance: 1,500; Referee: Matías Puigserver Trobat

20 May 2012	Tuilla	2 – 1	Real Ávila	Tuilla (Asturias)
18:00 CEST	Leiras 50' (pen.), 81'	Report	Gustavo 55' (pen.)	Stadium: El Candín; Attendance: 1,000; Referee: Fernando Martín Pérez

20 May 2012	Cultural Leonesa	2 – 2	Racing Santander B	León
18:00 CEST	Esaú 12'; Vázquez 61'	Report	Rivero 44'; Docal 77'	Stadium: Reino de León; Attendance: 4,500; Referee: Luis José López Abelleira

20 May 2012	Pontevedra	0 – 0	Espanyol B	Pontevedra
18:00 CEST		Report		Stadium: Pasarón; Attendance: 6,000; Referee: Bonifacio Tomás Suárez Súarez

20 May 2012	Beasain	3 – 3	Levante B	Beasain (Gipuzkoa)
18:00 CEST	Imaz 10'; Olaizola 54'; Iraola 87'	Report	Roger 14', 57'; Jalid 45'	Stadium: Loinaz; Attendance: 3,000; Referee: Jorge Cantalapiedra Calderón

20 May 2012	Extremadura UD	2 – 0	Haro	Almendralejo (Badajoz)
18:30 CEST	Carlos Rubén 48' (pen.); Angelito 90+3'	Report		Stadium: Francisco de la Hera; Attendance: 1,500; Referee: Luis López Segura

20 May 2012	GCE Villaralbo	0 – 1	Real Madrid C	Villaralbo (Zamora)
19:00 CEST		Report	Ramírez 28'	Stadium: Fernández García; Attendance: 700; Referee: Rubén Comesaña Bastero

20 May 2012	Mairena	3 – 1	Marbella	Mairena del Alcor (Seville)
19:00 CEST	Suanes 9'; Gago 83'; Aurelio 90+3'	Report	José Marí 28'	Stadium: Nuevo San Bartolomé; Attendance: 900; Referee: Bussian Mohand Mohand

20 May 2012	Azuqueca	1 – 1	Tudelano	Azuqueca de Henares (Guadalajara)
19:00 CEST	Pancorbo 63'	Report	David 27'	Stadium: San Miguel; Attendance: 1,500; Referee: Fernando José Yuste Heredero

20 May 2012	Mar Menor	1 – 1	Portugalete	San Javier (Region of Murcia)
19:00 CEST	Emilio 41'	Report	Zárate 20'	Stadium: Pitín; Attendance: 600; Referee: Roberto González Álvarez

20 May 2012	Maracena	0 – 1	Águilas	Maracena (Granada)
19:00 CEST		Report	Meca 27'	Stadium: Ciudad Deportiva; Attendance: 500; Referee: José Antonio Campos García

20 May 2012	Alzira	0 – 1	Sariñena	Alzira (Valencia)
19:00 CEST		Report	Yuste 69'	Stadium: Luis Suñer Picó; Attendance: 1,000; Referee: Ibán Fuentes Torrano

20 May 2012	La Hoya	0 – 0	Díter Zafra	La Hoya (Region of Murcia)
19:30 CEST		Report		Stadium: Los Tollos; Attendance: 2,000; Referee: José Manuel Rica Alarcón

20 May 2012	Don Benito	1 – 1	Unión Estepona	Don Benito (Badajoz)
20:00 CEST	Ordóñez 82'	Report	Ángel 12'	Stadium: Vicente Sanz; Attendance: 900; Referee: Jesús Rodríguez Cayetano

===== Second leg =====
26 May 2012	Real Madrid C	4 – 1 (5 – 1 agg.)	GCE Villaralbo	Madrid
12:00 CEST	Gonzalo 18' (o.g.); Fran Sol 36', 87'; Sobrino 41'	Report	Carmona 29'	Stadium: Ciudad Real Madrid; Attendance: 900; Referee: Juan Francisco Fernández Manzaneque

26 May 2012	Laredo	1 – 1 (2 – 3 agg.)	Pobla de Mafumet	Laredo (Cantabria)
18:00 CEST	Sergio 26'	Report	Coch 90+7'	Stadium: San Lorenzo; Attendance: 1,800; Referee: Iñaki Sáez de Adana Oribe

26 May 2012	Almansa	1 – 1 (1 – 3 agg.)	Vera	Almansa (Albacete)
19:30 CEST	Martí 29'	Report	Jony 90'	Stadium: Paco Simón; Attendance: 1,600; Referee: Juan Antonio Campos Salinas

26 May 2012	Alondras	2 – 0 (2 – 1 agg.)	Cayón	Cangas do Morrazo (Pontevedra)
20:00 CEST	Andrés 54', 60'	Report		Stadium: O Morrazo; Attendance: 1,200; Referee: Héctor Juan Bustos

26 May 2012	Barakaldo	2 – 1 (4 – 1 agg.)	Parla	Barakaldo (Biscay)
20:00 CEST	Mentxaka 43'; Eneko 64'	Report	Israel 55'	Stadium: Nuevo Lasesarre; Attendance: 2,500; Referee: Juan José Fernández Alonso

26 May 2012	Muro	2 – 1 (3 – 2 agg.)	Puerta Bonita	Muro de Alcoy (Alicante)
20:00 CEST	Álex Pascual 51'; Fageca 69'	Report	Iván García 20'	Stadium: La Llometa; Attendance: 1,200; Referee: Jorge Moya García

26 May 2012	Unión Estepona	1 – 0 (2 – 1 agg.)	Don Benito	Estepona (Málaga)
21:15 CEST	Núñez 20'	Report		Stadium: Francisco Muñoz Pérez; Attendance: 1,200; Referee: Juan Manuel Muñoz Méndez

26 May 2012	San Fernando	0 – 0 (1 – 1 agg.)	Mutilvera	San Fernando (Cádiz)
22:00 CEST		Report		Stadium: Iberoamericano 2010; Attendance: 2,500; Referee: Alberto Gómez Landero Osorio

27 May 2012	Alfaro	1 – 3 (a.e.t.) (2 – 4 agg.)	Montuïri	Alfaro (La Rioja)
11:00 CEST	del Puente 39'	Report	Pons 53'; Gilardoni 101', 111'	Stadium: La Molineta; Attendance: 1,000; Referee: Aitor Mosqueira Antón

27 May 2012	Binissalem	1 – 0 (1 – 0 agg.)	Albacete B	Binissalem (Mallorca)
11:00 CEST	Javi Fernández 70'	Report		Stadium: Miquel Pons; Attendance: 500; Referee: Xavier Bertomeu García

27 May 2012	Portugalete	1 – 0 (2 – 1 agg.)	Mar Menor	Portugalete (Biscay)
11:30 CEST	Juanma 6' (o.g.)	Report		Stadium: La Florida; Attendance: 1,800; Referee: Luis Felipe Arias de Juana

27 May 2012	Cerceda	1 – 0 (3 – 0 agg.)	Cuarte Industrial	Cerceda (A Coruña)
12:00 CEST	Moreira 84'	Report		Stadium: O Roxo; Attendance: 300; Referee: Víctor Gijón Peñas

27 May 2012	Espanyol B	3 – 0 (3 – 0 agg.)	Pontevedra	Barcelona
12:00 CEST	Alfonso 19', 74'; Bakary 37'	Report		Stadium: Ciutat Esportiva; Attendance: 2,700; Referee: Raúl Suárez Ramos

27 May 2012	Langreo	1 – 2 (1 – 3 agg.)	Llosetense	Langreo (Asturias)
12:00 CEST	Alonso 82'	Report	Ismael 17'; Tolo Reus 21'	Stadium: Nuevo Ganzábal; Attendance: 2,200; Referee: Héctor Gándara Gutiérrez

27 May 2012	Tenisca	1 – 1 (2 – 1 agg.)	Varea	Santa Cruz de La Palma (Tenerife)
12:00 CEST	Quesada 27'	Report	Maño 90+1'	Stadium: Virgen de Las Nieves; Attendance: 1,500; Referee: Pedro Eugenio Muñoz Piedra

27 May 2012	Las Palmas Atlético	1 – 2 (3 – 4 agg.)	Manlleu	Las Palmas de Gran Canaria
13:00 CEST	Micaló 45' (o.g.)	Report	Micaló 55'; Planagumà 59'	Stadium: Anexo Est. Gran Canaria; Attendance: 3,000; Referee: David Cortés Romero

27 May 2012	Sariñena	1 – 1 (2 – 1 agg.)	Alzira	Sariñena (Huesca)
17:30 CEST	Yuste 52'	Report	Suárez 74' (o.g.)	Stadium: El Carmen; Attendance: 600; Referee: Francisco Javier Medina Herrera

27 May 2012	Izarra	4 – 2 (a.e.t.) (6 – 5 agg.)	Utebo	Estella-Lizarra (Navarre)
18:00 CEST	Viana 5', 41'; Lizoain 24', 103'	Report	Javi García 46', 90+2'	Stadium: Merkatondoa; Attendance: 700; Referee: Josu Berasategi Zeberio

27 May 2012	Levante B	2 – 1 (5 – 4 agg.)	Beasain	Buñol (Valencia)
18:00 CEST	Dani Galán 23'; Roger 90+2'	Report	Sarasola 84' (pen.)	Stadium: Ciudad Deportiva; Attendance: 3,000; Referee: Carlos Royo García

27 May 2012	Racing Santander B	0 – 0 (2 – 2 agg.)	Cultural Leonesa	Santander
18:00 CEST		Report		Stadium: El Sardinero; Attendance: 3,000; Referee: Koldo Bilbao Uriarte

27 May 2012	Real Ávila	4 – 1 (5 – 3 agg.)	Tuilla	Ávila
18:00 CEST	Peña 51'; Cabezudo 53'; Gustavo 63' (pen.), 87'	Report	Leiras 34' (pen.)	Stadium: Adolfo Suárez; Attendance: 3,000; Referee: Víctor Manuel Pavón Guillén

27 May 2012	Tudelano	2 – 1 (3 – 2 agg.)	Azuqueca	Tudela (Navarre)
18:30 CEST	Jonathan 36', 90+4'	Report	Esaú 69'	Stadium: Ciudad de Tudela; Attendance: 2,000; Referee: Antonio Miguel Blanco

27 May 2012	Haro Deportivo	1 – 0 (1 – 2 agg.)	Extremadura UD	Haro (La Rioja)
19:00 CEST	Arpón 60'	Report		Stadium: El Mazo; Attendance: 1,500; Referee: Héctor García Fernández

27 May 2012	Marbella	2 – 0 (3 – 3 agg.)	Mairena	Marbella (Málaga)
19:00 CEST	Pibe 57', 69'	Report		Stadium: Estadio Municipal; Attendance: 1,200; Referee: José Romero Pérez

27 May 2012	Real Avilés	2 – 2 (2 – 2 agg.)	Coria	Avilés (Asturias)
19:00 CEST	Abraham 28' (pen.); Prieto 72'	Report	Juanma 46', 68' (pen.)	Stadium: Román Suárez Puerta; Attendance: 4,000; Referee: David Ruiz Rodiño

27 May 2012	Águilas	3 – 1 (4 – 1 agg.)	Maracena	Águilas (Region of Murcia)
19:30 CEST	Meca 65', 74'; Perico 88'	Report	Garrido 84'	Stadium: El Rubial; Attendance: 1,500; Referee: Saúl Ais Reig

27 May 2012	Díter Zafra	0 – 0 (a.e.t.) (0 – 0 agg.) (3 – 4 p)	La Hoya	Zafra (Badajoz)
20:00 CEST		Report		Stadium: Nuevo Estadio; Attendance: 3,000; Referee: Nicolás Fernández Arjona
	Penalties
	Ortega (penalty scored); Rafa (penalty scored); Moriano (penalty scored); Chicote (penalty missed); Tártara (penalty missed)		(penalty scored) Espinosa; (penalty scored) Israel; (penalty scored) Dani; (penalty scored) Prior; (penalty missed) Josán

=== Second round ===
==== Qualified teams ====
The draw will be held in the RFEF headquarters, in Las Rozas (Madrid), on 28 May 2012.

Group	Position	Team	Notes
4	1st	Laudio	Relegated from group winners promotion play-off
6	1st	Catarroja	Relegated from group winners promotion play-off
7	1st	Fuenlabrada	Relegated from group winners promotion play-off
8	1st	Real Valladolid B	Relegated from group winners promotion play-off
10	1st	Atlético Sanluqueño	Relegated from group winners promotion play-off
13	1st	Yeclano	Relegated from group winners promotion play-off
15	1st	Peña Sport	Relegated from group winners promotion play-off
17	1st	Ejea	Relegated from group winners promotion play-off
18	1st	Villarrobledo	Relegated from group winners promotion play-off

Group	Position	Team
1	2nd	Alondras
4	2nd	Barakaldo
5	2nd	RCD Espanyol B
6	2nd	Levante UD B
7	2nd	Real Madrid C
8	2nd	Real Ávila
9	2nd	Unión Estepona
10	2nd	San Fernando
11	2nd	Binissalem
12	2nd	Tenisca
13	2nd	Águilas
15	2nd	Izarra
17	2nd	Sariñena

Group	Position	Team
1	3rd	Cerceda
3	3rd	Racing Santander B
4	3rd	Portugalete
5	3rd	Manlleu
6	3rd	Muro
9	3rd	Marbella
11	3rd	Llosetense
14	3rd	Extremadura UD
15	3rd	Tudelano

Group	Position	Team
5	4th	Pobla de Mafumet
10	4th	Coria
11	4th	Montuïri
12	4th	Vera
13	4th	La Hoya

==== Matches ====
Team 1	Agg.	Team 2	1st leg	2nd leg
Coria	3–1	Real Valladolid B	3–0	0–1
Pobla de Mafumet	4–1	Ejea	2–0	2–1
La Hoya	1–3	Catarroja	0–0	1–3
Montuïri	2–5	Atlético Sanluqueño	1–1	1–4
Vera	1–8	Peña Sport	1–3	0–5
Tudelano	4–3	Villarrobledo	2–1	2–2
Muro	0–7	Yeclano	0–4	0–3
Cerceda	2–3	Fuenlabrada	2–1	0–2
Llosetense	1–4	Laudio	1–1	0–3
Portugalete	4–5	Águilas	2–2	2–3 (aet)
Manlleu	1–2	Binissalem	1–1	0–1
Racing Santander B	1–0	Alondras	1–0	0–0
Extremadura	4–2	Espanyol B	2–1	2–1
Marbella	1–4	Real Madrid C	1–2	0–2
Sariñena	1–4	Izarra	0–1	1–3
San Fernando	3–0	Levante B	2–0	1–0
Unión Estepona	3–4	Tenisca	1–3	2–1
Real Ávila	0–1	Barakaldo	0–0	0–1

===== First leg =====
2 June 2012	Manlleu	1 – 1	Binissalem	Manlleu (Barcelona)
18:00 CEST	Baruc 24'	Report	López 82'	Stadium: Estadio Municipal; Attendance: 1,200; Referee: Julio Mena Gimeno

2 June 2012	Montuïri	1 – 1	Atlético Sanluqueño	Montuïri (Balearic Islands)
19:00 CEST	Rojals 49'	Report	Calatayud 67'	Stadium: Es Revolt; Attendance: 400; Referee: Francisco Javier Márquez Gordo

2 June 2012	Pobla de Mafumet	2 – 0	Ejea	La Pobla de Mafumet (Tarragona)
19:00 CEST	Roca 67'; Casanova 72'	Report		Stadium: Estadio Municipal; Attendance: 500; Referee: Alfonso Carballal Vales

2 June 2012	Sariñena	0 – 1	Izarra	Sariñena (Huesca)
19:00 CEST		Report	Ibai 68'	Stadium: El Carmen; Attendance: Rafael Díaz Melero; Referee: 1,200

2 June 2012	Coria	3 – 0	Real Valladolid B	Coria del Río (Seville)
19:30 CEST	Juanma 37'; Curro 52'; Chico 71'	Report		Stadium: Guadalquivir; Attendance: 2,500; Referee: José María Pardo Martínez

2 June 2012	Marbella	1 – 2	Real Madrid C	Marbella (Málaga)
20:00 CEST	Pibe 32'	Report	López 81' (pen.); Sobrino 84'	Stadium: Estadio Municipal; Attendance: 2,000; Referee: Ricardo Escudero Marín

2 June 2012	Muro	0 – 4	Yeclano	Muro de Alcoy (Alicante)
20:00 CEST		Report	Miki 19', 73'; Rubén 42'; Ayo 84'	Stadium: La Llometa; Attendance: 1,100; Referee: Eduardo Fernández Vera

2 June 2012	Unión Estepona	1 – 3	Tenisca	Estepona (Málaga)
20:45 CEST	Boga 80'	Report	Memo 12', 44'; Dani López 45'	Stadium: Francisco Muñoz Pérez; Attendance: 1,300; Referee: Luis Alberto Marchante Flores

2 June 2012	San Fernando	2 – 0	Levante B	San Fernando (Cádiz)
21:30 CEST	Carlitos 29', 70'	Report		Stadium: Iberoamericano 2010; Attendance: 2,800; Referee: Jerónimo Pérez Vidarte

3 June 2012	Llosetense	1 – 1	Laudio	Lloseta (Balearic Islands)
11:00 CEST	Ismael 48'	Report	Silas 31'	Stadium: Estadio Municipal; Attendance: 700; Referee: Luis Pablo Querol

3 June 2012	Portugalete	2 – 2	Águilas	Portugalete (Biscay)
11:30 CEST	Zárate 42'; Vicky 90+4'	Report	Perico 51'; José Manuel 69'	Stadium: La Florida; Attendance: 2,000; Referee: José Alberto Pardeiro Puente

3 June 2012	Vera	1 – 3	Peña Sport	Puerto de la Cruz (Tenerife)
13:00 CEST	Álex Caleta 39'	Report	Ederra 4'; Galán 9'; Toni 75'	Stadium: Salvador Ledesma; Attendance: 1,300; Referee: Eduardo Barranquero Sánchez

3 June 2012	Cerceda	2 – 1	Fuenlabrada	Cerceda (A Coruña)
17:00 CEST	Joselu 28'; Souto 58'	Report	Pachón 54'	Stadium: O Roxo; Attendance: 450; Referee: José Ramón Alonso de la Lama

3 June 2012	Real Ávila	0 – 0	Barakaldo	Ávila
18:00 CEST		Report		Stadium: Adolfo Suárez; Attendance: 3,200; Referee: Álvaro Moreno Aragón

3 June 2012	Racing de Santander B	1 – 0	Alondras	Santander
18:00 CEST	Maxi 66' (pen.)	Report		Stadium: El Sardinero; Attendance: 3,000; Referee: César Díez Cano

3 June 2012	Tudelano	2 – 1	Villarrobledo	Tudela (Navarre)
19:00 CEST	Jonathan 26'; Jordi Martí 36'	Report	Vílchez 19'	Stadium: Ciudad de Tudela; Attendance: 2,500; Referee: César Soto Grado

3 June 2012	Extremadura	2 – 1	Espanyol B	Almendralejo (Badajoz)
19:30 CEST	Uru 8'; Carmona 39'	Report	Jorge 62'	Stadium: Francisco de la Hera; Attendance: 3,200; Referee: Joaquín Jesús Hernández García

3 June 2012	La Hoya	0 – 0	Catarroja	La Hoya (Region of Murcia)
19:30 CEST		Report		Stadium: Los Tollos; Attendance: 3,000; Referee: Antonio Artacho Cobo

===== Second leg =====
9 June 2012	Izarra	3 – 1 (4 – 1 agg.)	Sariñena	Estella-Lizarra (Navarre)
17:00 CEST	Viana 50'; Azcona 69'; Álex 90+1'	Report	Drulić 24'	Stadium: Merkatondoa; Attendance: 1,200; Referee: Koldobika Aretxabaleta Saratsola

9 June 2012	Levante B	0 – 1 (0 – 3 agg.)	San Fernando	Buñol (Valencia)
18:00 CEST		Report	Puli 89'	Stadium: Ciudad Deportiva; Attendance: 1,000; Referee: Salvador Fornés Bover

9 June 2012	Alondras	0 – 0 (0 – 1 agg.)	Racing de Santander B	Cangas do Morrazo (Pontevedra)
19:00 CEST		Report		Stadium: O Morrazo; Attendance: 2,300; Referee: Luis Javier Alberca García

9 June 2012	Binissalem	1 – 0 (2 – 1 agg.)	Manlleu	Binissalem, (Majorca)
19:00 CEST	Ángel 76'	Report		Stadium: Miquel Pons; Attendance: 1,500; Referee: Alejandro Chaves Gallego

9 June 2012	Ejea	1 – 2 (1 – 4 agg.)	Pobla de Mafumet	Ejea de los Caballeros, (Zaragoza)
19:00 CEST	Edu Roldán 19'	Report	Roca 45'; Sebas 76'	Stadium: Luchán; Attendance: 2,500; Referee: José María Munilla Prades

9 June 2012	Real Valladolid B	1 – 0 (1 – 3 agg.)	Coria	Valladolid
19:00 CEST	Toni 90+2' (pen.)	Report		Stadium: Anexos José Zorrilla; Attendance: 800; Referee: Óscar López Rodríguez

9 June 2012	Tenisca	1 – 2 (4 – 3 agg.)	Unión Estepona	Santa Cruz de La Palma (Tenerife)
19:00 CEST	Cabrera 2'	Report	Álex 16'; Añón 29'	Stadium: Virgen de Las Nieves; Attendance: 1,800; Referee: Luis Miguel Serrano Romero

9 June 2012	Villarrobledo	2 – 2 (3 – 4 agg.)	Tudelano	Villarrobledo, (Albacete)
19:00 CEST	Abengózar 65'; Javi Bolo 90'	Report	Esparza 42'; Damián 86'	Stadium: Nuestra Señora de la Caridad; Attendance: 3,000; Referee: Basilio Puerta Sánchez

9 June 2012	Catarroja	3 – 1 (3 – 1 agg.)	La Hoya	Catarroja, (Valencia)
19:30 CEST	Ernesto 12'; Romero 28'; Roldán 87'	Report	Josán 79'	Stadium: Mundial 82; Attendance: 2,000; Referee: Pablo Burillo Naranjo

9 June 2012	Barakaldo	1 – 0 (1 – 0 agg.)	Real Ávila	Barakaldo (Biscay)
20:00 CEST	Alberto 11'	Report		Stadium: Nuevo Lasesarre; Attendance: 3,000; Referee: Luis Felipe Arias de Juana

9 June 2012	Yeclano	3 – 0 (7 – 0 agg.)	Muro	Yecla, (Region of Murcia)
20:00 CEST	Juanjo 71'; Tonete 87'; Micky 90'	Report		Stadium: La Constitución; Attendance: 1,100; Referee: José Manuel Rica Alarcón

9 June 2012	Atlético Sanluqueño	4 – 1 (5 – 2 agg.)	Montuïri	Sanlúcar de Barrameda, (Cádiz)
21:00 CEST	Herrero 9', 38'; José 30'; Silva 85'	Report	Pou 68'	Stadium: El Palmar; Attendance: 5,000; Referee: Alberto Gómez Landero Osorio

10 June 2012	Laudio	3 – 0 (4 – 1 agg.)	Llosetense	Laudio/Llodio (Álava)
11:30 CEST	Silas 49'; Javi Antón 70'; Yartu 77'	Report		Stadium: Ellakuri; Attendance: 700; Referee: Juan Borja Guillén San Francisco

10 June 2012	Águilas	3 – 2 (a.e.t.) (5 – 4 agg.)	Portugalete	Águilas (Region of Murcia)
12:00 CEST	Álex Díaz 9'; Perico 57', 111' (pen.)	Report	Vidal 70' (pen.), 84' (pen.)	Stadium: El Rubial; Attendance: 2,200; Referee: Miguel García Aceña

10 June 2012	Fuenlabrada	2 – 0 (3 – 2 agg.)	Cerceda	Fuenlabrada (Madrid)
12:00 CEST	Eloy 11'; Chumi 89'	Report		Stadium: Fernando Torres; Attendance: 1,600; Referee: Víctor Guillén García

10 June 2012	Peña Sport	5 – 0 (8 – 1 agg.)	Vera	Tafalla (Navarre)
12:00 CEST	Ederra 2'; Úriz 10'; Jiménez 61'; Calvo 83'; Rodrigo 86'	Report		Stadium: San Francisco; Attendance: 400; Referee: Jon Etxarri Los Santos

10 June 2012	Real Madrid C	2 – 0 (4 – 1 agg.)	Marbella	Madrid
12:00 CEST	Guerrero 20' (o.g.); Ramírez 29'	Report		Stadium: Ciudad Real Madrid; Attendance: 500; Referee: Ariel Jorge González Sicilia

10 June 2012	Espanyol B	1 – 2 (2 – 4 agg.)	Extremadura	Barcelona
12:30 CEST	Jorge 44'	Report	Carlos Rubén 65', 82'	Stadium: Ciutat Esportiva; Attendance: 2,500; Referee: Ramón Alexis Mederos Barroso

=== Final round ===
==== Qualified teams ====
The draw took place in the RFEF headquarters, in Las Rozas (Madrid), on 11 June 2012.

Group	Position	Team	Notes
4	1st	Laudio	Relegated from group winners promotion play-off
6	1st	Catarroja	Relegated from group winners promotion play-off
7	1st	Fuenlabrada	Relegated from group winners promotion play-off
10	1st	Atlético Sanluqueño	Relegated from group winners promotion play-off
13	1st	Yeclano	Relegated from group winners promotion play-off
15	1st	Peña Sport	Relegated from group winners promotion play-off

Group	Position	Team
4	2nd	Barakaldo
7	2nd	Real Madrid C
10	2nd	San Fernando
11	2nd	Binissalem
12	2nd	Tenisca
13	2nd	Águilas
15	2nd	Izarra

Group	Position	Team
3	3rd	Racing Santander B
14	3rd	Extremadura UD
15	3rd	Tudelano

Group	Position	Team
5	4th	Pobla de Mafumet
10	4th	Coria

==== Matches ====
Team 1	Agg.	Team 2	1st leg	2nd leg
Pobla de Mafumet	2–2 (4–5 p)	Yeclano	2–1	1–2 (aet)
Coria	0–4	Fuenlabrada	0–3	0–1
Extremadura	1–3	Atlético Sanluqueño	0–1	1–2
Tudelano	5–0	Catarroja	4–0	1–0
Racing Santander B	2–2 (a)	Peña Sport	1–2	1–0
San Fernando	3–0	Laudio	2–0	1–0
Real Madrid C	1–5	Binissalem	0–2	1–3
Barakaldo	1–1 (a)	Águilas	0–0	1–1
Izarra	0–0 (4–2 p)	Tenisca	0–0	0–0 (aet)

===== First leg =====
16 June 2012	Coria	0 – 3	Fuenlabrada	Coria del Río (Seville)
19:30 CEST		Report	Pulido 9'; Pachón 44'; Eloy 74'	Stadium: Guadalquivir; Attendance: 3,500; Referee: José Ángel Morillo Cotano

17 June 2012	Real Madrid C	0 – 2	Binissalem	Madrid
12:00 CEST		Report	Tito 75'; Miquel López 83'	Stadium: Ciudad Real Madrid; Attendance: 600; Referee: Carlos Franco Galván

17 June 2012	Barakaldo	0 – 0	Águilas	Barakaldo (Biscay)
18:00 CEST		Report		Stadium: Nuevo Lasesarre; Attendance: 4,000; Referee: David Ruiz Rodiño

17 June 2012	Izarra	0 – 0	Tenisca	Estella-Lizarra (Navarre)
18:00 CEST		Report		Stadium: Merkatondoa; Attendance: 1,500; Referee: Antonio Monter Solans

17 June 2012	Racing Santander B	1 – 2	Peña Sport	Santander
18:00 CEST	Maxi 53'	Report	Úriz 23'; Arrondo 35'	Stadium: El Sardinero; Attendance: 4,000; Referee: César Ramos Domínguez

17 June 2012	Extremadura	0 – 1	Atlético Sanluqueño	Almendralejo, (Badajoz)
18:30 CEST		Report	Óscar Silva 48'	Stadium: Francisco de la Hera; Attendance: 6,000; Referee: Jesús Rodríguez Cayetano

17 June 2012	Pobla de Mafumet	2 – 1	Yeclano	La Pobla de Mafumet (Tarragona)
19:00 CEST	Coch 15'; Casanova 35'	Report	Román 19'	Stadium: Estadio Municipal; Attendance: 2,000; Referee: Mohammed Ndiaye

17 June 2012	Tudelano	4 – 0	Catarroja	Tudela (Navarre)
19:00 CEST	Jordi Martí 1', 50', 59', 76'	Report		Stadium: Ciudad de Tudela; Attendance: 3,500; Referee: Juan Borja Guillén San Francisco

17 June 2012	San Fernando	2 – 0	Laudio	San Fernando (Cádiz)
20:30 CEST	Carrión 41' (pen.); Ocaña 84'	Report		Stadium: Iberoamericano 2010; Attendance: 4,000; Referee: Luis Alberto Marchante Flores

===== Second leg =====
23 June 2012	Catarroja	0 – 1 (0 – 5 agg.)	Tudelano	Catarroja, (Valencia)
18:00 CEST		Report	David Pérez 36'	Stadium: Mundial 82; Referee: Samuel de Haro Tirado

23 June 2012	Laudio	0 – 1 (0 – 3 agg.)	San Fernando	Laudio/Llodio (Álava)
18:00 CEST		Report	Ñoño 83'	Stadium: Ellakuri; Attendance: 1,500; Referee: Fernando Castillejo Álvarez

24 June 2012	Águilas	1 – 1 (1 – 1 agg.)	Barakaldo	Águilas (Region of Murcia)
12:00 CEST	Perico 52'	Report	Ariño 58'	Stadium: El Rubial; Attendance: 3,000; Referee: Francisco Javier Márquez Gordo

24 June 2012	Fuenlabrada	1 – 0 (4 – 0 agg.)	Coria	Fuenlabrada (Madrid)
12:00 CEST	Eloy 55'	Report		Stadium: Fernando Torres; Attendance: 1,500; Referee: Saúl Plaza García

24 June 2012	Tenisca	0 – 0 (a.e.t.) (0 – 0 agg.) (2 – 4 p)	Izarra	Santa Cruz de La Palma (Tenerife)
13:00 CEST		Report		Stadium: Virgen de Las Nieves; Attendance: 3,000; Referee: Luis López Segura
	Penalties
	Cabrera (penalty scored); Dani López (penalty missed); Abraham (penalty scored); Simón (penalty missed)		(penalty scored) Azcona; (penalty scored) Guembe; (penalty scored) Maestresalas; (penalty scored) Zazu

24 June 2012	Binissalem	3 – 1 (5 – 1 agg.)	Real Madrid C	Binissalem, (Majorca)
17:00 CEST	Ángel 67'; Javi Fernández 82', 90+2'	Report	Fran Sol 62'	Stadium: Miquel Pons; Attendance: 2,000; Referee: Daniel Navarro Jiménez

24 June 2012	Peña Sport	0 – 1 (2 – 2 agg.)	Racing Santander B	Tafalla (Navarre)
18:00 CEST		Report	Maxi 43'	Stadium: San Francisco; Attendance: 1,500; Referee: Tomás Martín Pérez

24 June 2012	Yeclano	2 – 1 (a.e.t.) (3 – 3 agg.) (5 – 4 p)	Pobla de Mafumet	Yecla, (Region of Murcia)
19:00 CEST	Pascui 5'; Micky 79'	Report	Jordi Roca 17'	Stadium: La Constitución; Attendance: 3,500; Referee: Julio Mena Gimeno
	Penalties
	Tonete (penalty scored); Rubén (penalty missed); Keko (penalty scored); Ayo (penalty scored); José Ramón (penalty scored); Rafa (penalty scored)		(penalty scored) Seba; (penalty scored) Bueno; (penalty scored) Joel; (penalty scored) Aarón; (penalty missed) Jordi Roca; (penalty missed) Mozó

24 June 2012	Atlético Sanluqueño	2 – 1 (3 – 1 agg.)	Extremadura	Sanlúcar de Barrameda, (Cádiz)
20:00 CEST	Gallardo 53', 89'	Report	Carlos Rubén 74' (pen.)	Stadium: El Palmar; Attendance: 6,000; Referee: Pablo Burillo Naranjo

Promoted to Segunda División B
Tudelano (16 years later)	San Fernando (First time ever)	Fuenlabrada (4 years later)	Barakaldo (1 year later)	Izarra (2 years later)	Binissalem (First time ever)	Peña Sport (1 year later)	Yeclano (1 year later)	Atlético Sanluqueño (20 years later)

== See also ==
- 2012 Segunda División play-offs
- 2012 Segunda División B play-offs
