= Pedro Tarancón =

Spanish footballer (born 1985)

Personal information
- Full name: Pedro Tarancón Antón
- Date of birth: December 18, 1985 (age 40)
- Place of birth: Spain
- Height: 1.82 m (6 ft 0 in)
- Position: Defender

Senior career*
Years	Team	Apps	(Gls)
–2008	Atlético Levante UD		
2008–2014	Catarroja CF		
2014–2015	SK Victoria Wanderers FC		
2015	Club Eagles		
2016	B68 Toftir		
2017	Ítróttarfelag Fuglafjarðar		
2018–2019	B68 Toftir		
2020	Argja Bóltfelag		
2021	Skála ÍF		
2022–	B68 Toftir		
- * Club domestic league appearances and goals

Pedro Tarancón Antón (born 18 December 1985) is a Spanish footballer who plays as a defender for B68 Toftir.

== Early life ==
He is a native of Valencia, Spain. He joined the youth academy of Spanish side Burjassot CF at the age of fifteen. He joined the youth academy of Spanish side Los Silos CF at the age of sixteen.

== Career ==
He started his career with Spanish side Atlético Levante UD. In 2008, he signed for Spanish side Catarroja CF. In 2014, he signed for Maltese side SK Victoria Wanderers FC. In 2015, he signed for Maldivian side Club Eagles. In 2016, he signed for Faroese side B68 Toftir. He became the first Spanish player to play in the Faroese top flight. On 6 March 2016, he debuted for the club during a 1–1 draw with Argja Bóltfelag. In 2017, he signed for Faroese side Ítróttarfelag Fuglafjarðar. On 21 July 2017, he debuted for the club during a 0–4 loss to Víkingur Gøta. On 15 October 2017, he scored his first goal for the during a 4–2 win over EB/Streymur. In 2018, he returned to Faroese side B68 Toftir. In 2020, he signed for Faroese side Argja Bóltfelag. In 2021, he signed for Faroese side Skála ÍF. He helped the club achieve promotion. In 2022, he returned again to Faroese side B68 Toftir.

== Style of play ==
He operates as a defender. He mainly operates as a central defender.

== Personal life ==
He suffered a traffic accident during his football career. He has been married to a Faroese woman and has two daughters.
