= Olaizola =

Olaizola is a Basque surname. Notable people with the surname include:

- Aimar Olaizola (born 1979), Basque pelota player, known as Olaizola II, brother of Asier
- Ander Olaizola (born 1989), Spanish footballer
- Asier Olaizola (born 1975), Basque pelota player, known as Olaizola I
- Javier Olaizola (born 1969), Spanish footballer
- José Luis Olaizola (1927–2025), Spanish writer
- Julio Olaizola (born 1950), Spanish footballer
- Manuel Aierdi Olaizola (born 1967), Basque politician
