= Cristo Díaz =

Spanish footballer

Personal information
- Full name: Cristo Díaz Martín
- Date of birth: 20 June 1992 (age 34)
- Place of birth: El Sauzal, Spain
- Height: 1.80 m (5 ft 11 in)
- Position: Midfielder

Team information
- Current team: Atlético Tacoronte

Youth career
- Puerto Cruz
- 2010–2011: Vera

Senior career*
Years	Team	Apps	(Gls)
2011–2012	Vera	29	(1)
2012–2015	Tenerife B	54	(6)
2013–2014	→ Victoria (loan)	32	(1)
2014–2016	Tenerife	10	(0)
2015–2016	→ Algeciras (loan)	36	(1)
2016–2017	Lorca Deportiva	18	(3)
2017	Tenisca	14	(1)
2017–2018	Eldense	37	(7)
2018	Izarra	16	(2)
2019–	Atlético Tacoronte	8	(4)
- * Club domestic league appearances and goals as of 1 February 2019

Cristo Díaz Martín (born 20 June 1992) is a Spanish footballer as a central midfielder for Atlético Tacoronte.

== Club career ==
Born in El Sauzal, Santa Cruz de Tenerife, Canary Islands, Díaz graduated from CD Vera's youth setup, after starting it out at neighbouring CD Puerto Cruz. He made his debuts as a senior in the 2010–11 campaign, in Tercera División.

In the 2012 summer Díaz moved to CD Tenerife, being assigned to the reserves also in the fourth level. In August 2013 he was loaned to CA Victoria, in the same division.

On 22 November 2014 Díaz played his first match as a professional, replacing Ricardo León in the 56th minute of a 0–0 home draw against RCD Mallorca in the Segunda División championship. On 28 July of the following year he was loaned to Algeciras CF in Segunda División B.

On 24 January 2019, Díaz joined Atlético Tacoronte.
