= Carlitos (footballer, born March 1985) =

Spanish footballer

Personal information
- Full name: Juan Carlos Moreno Rojo
- Date of birth: 14 March 1985 (age 41)
- Place of birth: Cádiz, Spain
- Height: 1.75 m (5 ft 9 in)
- Position: Midfielder

Youth career
- Chiclana
- Cádiz

Senior career*
Years	Team	Apps	(Gls)
2003–2006	Cádiz B		
2004	Cádiz	2	(1)
2006–2008	Xerez B	38	(2)
2008–2010	Chiclana	60	(18)
2010–2016	San Fernando	168	(22)
2016–2021	Rayo Majadahonda	88	(6)
Total		356+	(49+)
- * Club domestic league appearances and goals

Juan Carlos Moreno Rojo (born 14 March 1985), known as Carlitos, is a Spanish former footballer who played as a midfielder.

== Club career ==
Born in Cádiz, Andalusia, Carlitos finished his youth career with Cádiz CF, and made his senior debut with the reserves in the 2003–04 season. On 24 April 2004 he played his first match as a professional, as a 79th-minute substitute in a 2–2 Segunda División away draw against Ciudad de Murcia. His only goal in the league came on 19 June, in the 2–1 home win over UD Almería.

Carlitos was released in summer 2006, and resumed his career in the Tercera División, representing Xerez CD B, Chiclana CF and San Fernando CD. He achieved promotion to Segunda División B with the latter at the end of the 2011–12 campaign, appearing in 33 games and scoring three times.

On 1 July 2016, Carlitos signed for third-tier club CF Rayo Majadahonda. He contributed five goals from 33 appearances in 2017–18, in a first-ever promotion to division two.
