= El Real de la Jara =

El Real de la Jara, Spain
- Municipality of Spain
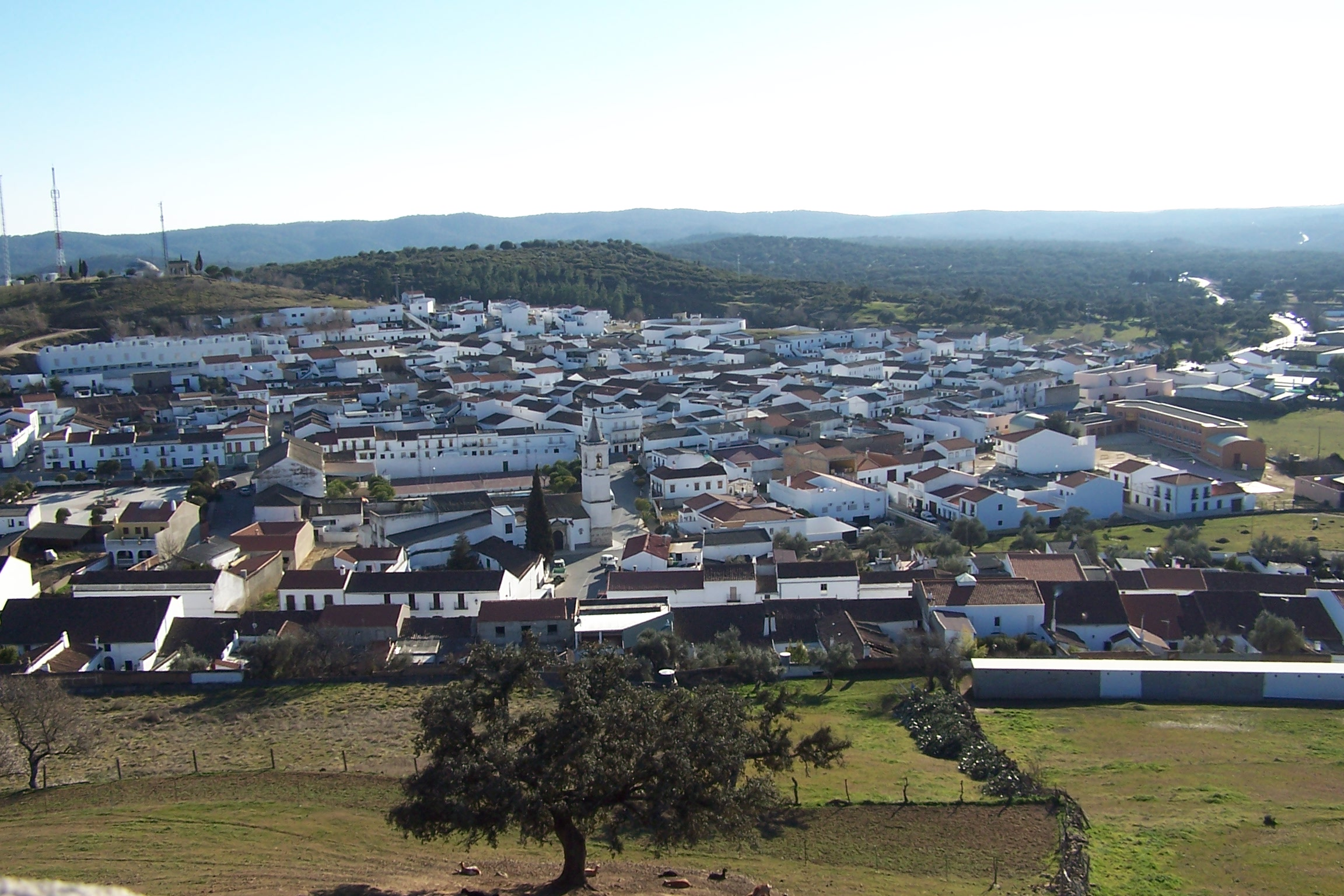

- Flag Coat of arms
- Interactive map of El Real de la Jara, Spain
- Coordinates: 37°57′N 6°09′W
- Country: Spain
- Province: Seville

Government
  - Mayor: Jose Manuel Trejo Fernandez

Area
  - Total: 160 km^{2} (62 sq mi)
- Elevation: 465 m (1,526 ft)

Population (2025-01-01)
  - Total: 1,517
  - Density: 9.5/km^{2} (25/sq mi)
- Time zone: UTC+1 (CET)
  - Summer (DST): UTC+2 (CEST)

El Real de la Jara is a Spanish municipality located in the province of Seville. According to a 2021 census by INE, the municipality has a population of 1,513.

== Notable people ==
Carlos Rubén (born 1983), footballer

== Gallery ==
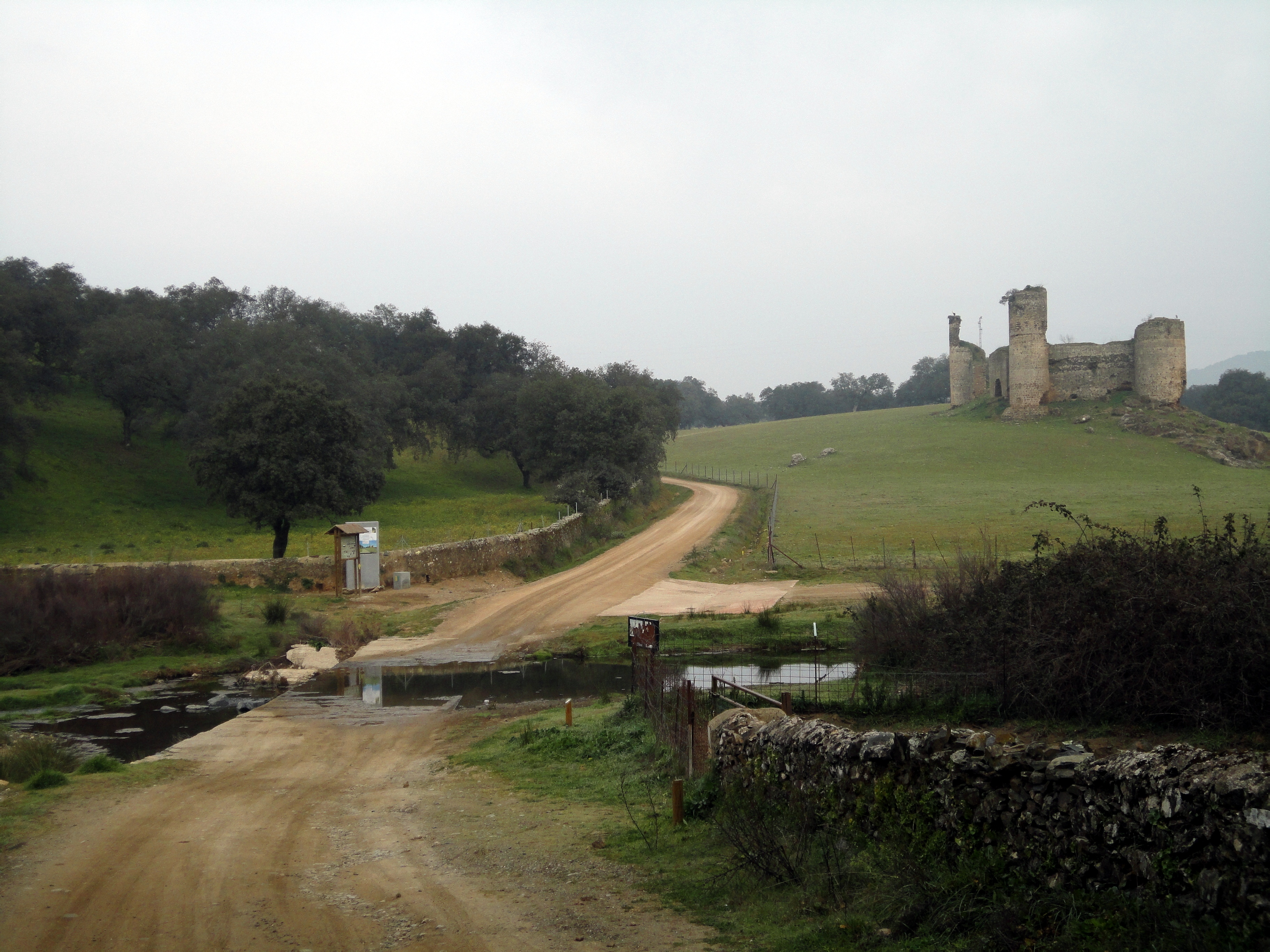
Castle ruins just outside El Real de la Jara

== See also ==
- List of municipalities in Seville
