= Sergio Pachón =

Spanish footballer

Personal information
- Full name: Valentín Sergio Pachón Mosquero
- Date of birth: 5 February 1977 (age 49)
- Place of birth: Madrid, Spain
- Height: 1.80 m (5 ft 11 in)
- Position: Striker

Senior career*
Years	Team	Apps	(Gls)
1995–1996	Rayo Aula		
1996–1998	Parla		
1998–1999	Leganés B	4	(2)
1998–2000	Leganés	66	(17)
2000–2004	Valladolid	62	(8)
2004	→ Getafe (loan)	24	(10)
2004–2007	Getafe	64	(9)
2007–2010	Rayo Vallecano	97	(29)
2010–2011	Cádiz	36	(11)
2011–2016	Fuenlabrada	155	(39)
Total		508	(125)
- * Club domestic league appearances and goals

Valentín Sergio Pachón Mosquero (born 5 February 1977) is a Spanish former professional footballer who played as a striker.

He totalled 126 games and 17 goals in La Liga over seven seasons, with Valladolid and Getafe. He added 155 appearances in the Segunda División, scoring 40 goals in service of three clubs.

== Playing career ==
=== Leganés ===
Born in Madrid, Pachón started his career in the Spanish fifth division, spending the following season in the Tercera División. He then signed for CD Leganés also in his native region, being instrumental as the team managed to consecutively retain their Segunda División status; he notably scored 12 goals in 1999–2000.

=== Valladolid ===
Pachón moved to La Liga in summer 2000, being irregularly used at Real Valladolid (31 games in his first year and 24 in the 2002–03 campaign, but only seven over the other two seasons) mainly due to a cruciate ligament injury. He played his first game in the competition on 10 September, in a 1–1 away draw against RCD Mallorca.

On 23 September 2000, Pachón scored his first goal in the top flight, opening an eventual 1–1 draw at UD Las Palmas.

=== Getafe ===
Pachón was released in July 2004 and returned to the capital, now with Getafe CF where he had previously been on loan, again being a very important attacking player in the club's first-ever promotion to the top division; on 19 June, he had scored all five goals in the decisive 5–3 away win over CD Tenerife.

Pachón was mainly used as a substitute under Bernd Schuster afterwards, but also helped the side to the 2007 final of the Copa del Rey.

=== Rayo Vallecano ===
Subsequently, Pachón stayed in the Community of Madrid, helping Rayo Vallecano to Segunda División B promotion in 2007–08. He finished the following season with nine goals – second-best in the squad – as the team overachieved for a final fifth place.

=== Later career ===
On 21 August 2010, the 33-year-old Pachón joined Cádiz CF of Segunda División B as a free agent. One year later, he signed with CF Fuenlabrada one league below, achieving third-tier promotion in his debut campaign.

== Post-retirement ==
Pachón returned to Getafe in June 2016, to work with the club as youth system coordinator.
