= Marcos Guerrero =

Spanish footballer

Personal information
- Full name: Marcos Guerrero Tejada
- Date of birth: 16 April 1984 (age 42)
- Place of birth: Arroyo de la Miel, Spain
- Height: 1.84 m (6 ft 1/2 in)
- Position: Centre back

Youth career
- Málaga

Senior career*
Years	Team	Apps	(Gls)
2002–2004	Málaga B	7	(0)
2004–2005	Hércules	0	(0)
2005–2006	Alhaurino		
2007	Torrevieja		
2007–2008	Villanueva		
2008–2009	Manchego		
2009	Zamora	11	(1)
2010–2011	Badajoz	13	(3)
2011	Sporting Villanueva		
2011–2012	Marbella	20	(1)
2012–2013	Estepona	6	(0)
2013–2014	Atlético Benamiel	3	(0)
- * Club domestic league appearances and goals

Marcos Guerrero Tejada (born 16 April 1984) is a Spanish former footballer who played as a central defender.
