= Juan Manuel Pérez =

Argentine footballer

Personal information
- Full name: Juan Manuel Pérez García
- Date of birth: 14 October 1993 (age 33)
- Place of birth: Buenos Aires, Argentina
- Height: 1.79 m (5 ft 10 in)
- Position: Forward

Youth career
- Gimnasia de Mendoza

Senior career*
Years	Team	Apps	(Gls)
2013–2015	Magallanes	28	(2)
2016	FC Jumilla	4	(0)
2016–2017	Colchagua	24	(3)
2017–2019	FADEP		
2019–2021	Juventud Unida Universitario	21	(0)
2021	Guspini		
2021–2022	Castiadas		
2022	Don Bosco Guspini		
- * Club domestic league appearances and goals

Juan Manuel Pérez García (born 14 October 1993) is an Argentine footballer who plays as a forward.

== Teams ==
- (Chile) Magallanes 2013–2015
- (Spain) FC Jumilla 2016
- (Chile) Colchagua 2016–2017
- (Argentina) FADEP 2017–2019
- (Argentina) Juventud Unida Universitario 2019–2021
- (Italy) Guspini 2021
- (Italy) Castiadas 2021–2022
- (Italy) Don Bosco Guspini 2022
