= Mariano Pulido =

Spanish footballer (1956-2013)

Personal information
- Full name: José Mariano Pulido Solís
- Date of birth: 22 August 1956
- Place of birth: Marchena, Spain
- Date of death: 2 April 2013 (aged 56)
- Place of death: Alcalá de Guadaíra, Spain
- Height: 1.75 m (5 ft 9 in)
- Position: Defender

Youth career
- 1968–1973: Sevilla

Senior career*
Years	Team	Apps	(Gls)
1973–1975	Sevilla B		
1974–1980	Sevilla	56	(0)
1978–1979	→ Elche (loan)	22	(1)
1980–1982	Castellón	48	(0)
1982–1987	Linares	135	(0)
1987–1988	Ceuta	37	(0)
1988–1989	Écija		
Total		298	(1)

International career
1974–1975	Spain U18	7	(0)
1976	Spain amateur	1	(0)
- * Club domestic league appearances and goals

José Mariano Pulido Solís (22 August 1956 – 2 April 2013) was a Spanish professional footballer who played as a defender.

== Club career ==
Born in Marchena, Province of Seville, Pulido made his professional – and Segunda División – debut with local Sevilla FC at only 17, playing the full 90 minutes in a 4–1 away loss against Gimnàstic de Tarragona on 17 March 1974. He only appeared in a combined eight first-team games in his first two seasons, however, being mainly registered with the reserves.

After three more La Liga campaigns with the Andalusians, Pulido was loaned to second level's Elche CF for 1978–79. Released by his main club in June 1980 after having appeared in a total of 70 official matches, he played three of his final four professional seasons in division two, with CD Castellón and Linares CF.

== International career ==
Pulido represented Spain at the 1976 Summer Olympics in Montreal, appearing in a 0–1 loss against East Germany for an eventual group stage exit.

== Later life and death ==
After retiring, Pulido continued working with Sevilla, mainly as youth coach but also in directorial capacities. He died on 2 April 2013 in Alcalá de Guadaíra due to degenerative disease, at the age of 56.

Pulido's son, Jorge, was also a footballer and a defender. He spent his entire career in the lower leagues.
