= Atlético Tacoronte =

Spanish football team

- Full name: Club Atlético Tacoronte
- Founded: 1969
- Ground: Barranco Las Lajas, Tacoronte, Canary Islands, Spain
- Capacity: 1,200
- President: Juan José Melián
- Manager: Jonatan Ravelo
- League: Interinsular Preferente
- 2024–25: Interinsular Preferente, 6th of 21
Home colours	Away colours

Club Atlético Tacoronte is a Spanish football team based in Tacoronte, in the Canary Islands. Founded in 1969, they play in Interinsular Preferente, holding home games at Campo de Fútbol Barranco Las Lajas, with a capacity of 1,200 people.

== History ==
Founded in 1969, Atlético Tacoronte played in the regional leagues intermittently until 2006, when the club returned to an active status and reached a first-ever promotion to the Interinsular Preferente in 2012. In April 2018, the club assured a promotion to Tercera División for the first time ever.

== Season to season ==
Season	Tier	Division	Place	Copa del Rey
2006–07	7	2ª Int.	5th	
2007–08	6	1ª Int.	14th	
2008–09	6	1ª Int.	12th	
2009–10	6	1ª Int.	5th	
2010–11	6	1ª Int.	5th	
2011–12	6	1ª Int.	1st	
2012–13	5	Int. Pref.	10th	
2013–14	5	Int. Pref.	3rd	
2014–15	5	Int. Pref.	7th	
2015–16	5	Int. Pref.	2nd	
2016–17	5	Int. Pref.	7th	
2017–18	5	Int. Pref.	1st	
2018–19	4	3ª	13th	
2019–20	4	3ª	16th	
2020–21	4	3ª	8th / 6th	
2021–22	6	Int. Pref.	1st	
2022–23	6	Int. Pref.	3rd	
2023–24	6	Int. Pref.	5th	
2024–25	6	Int. Pref.	6th	
2025–26	6	Int. Pref.	14th	

Season	Tier	Division	Place	Copa del Rey
2026–27	6	Int. Pref.		

- 3 seasons in Tercera División
