= CD Cuarte =

Association football club in Spain

Cuarte
- Full name: Club Deportivo Cuarte
- Founded: 1969; 57 years ago
- Stadium: Estadio Juan Guerrero "El Lobo"
- Capacity: 2,000
- President: Antonio Solbes
- Head coach: José Luis Loreto
- League: Tercera Federación – Group 17
- 2025–26: Tercera Federación – Group 17, 2nd of 18
- Website: cdcuarte.es
Home colours	Away colours

Club Deportivo Cuarte is a Spanish football team based in Cuarte de Huerva, in the autonomous community of Aragon. Founded in 1969, it plays in Tercera Federación – Group 17, holding home games at Nuevo Estadio Municipal de Cuarte de Huerva, with a capacity of 1,000 spectators.

For 2012–13 season, the club dropped "Industrial" word from its official name, being the new CD Cuarte.

== History ==
=== Club background ===
- Club Deportivo Cuarte (1969–1979; 2012–)
- Club Deportivo Cuarte Industrial (1979–2012)

== Season to season ==
Season	Tier	Division	Place	Copa del Rey
1970–71	6	2ª Reg.	13th	
1971–72	6	2ª Reg.	16th	
1972–73	7	2ª Reg.	9th	
1973–74	7	2ª Reg.	7th	
1974–75	7	2ª Reg.	7th	
1975–76	8	3ª Reg.	10th	
1976–77	8	3ª Reg.	1st	
1977–78	8	3ª Reg.	1st	
1978–79	7	2ª Reg.	1st	
1979–80	6	1ª Reg.	16th	
1980–81	6	1ª Reg.	14th	
1981–82	6	1ª Reg.	20th	
1982–83	7	2ª Reg.	16th	
1983–84	8	2ª Reg. B	6th	
1984–85	8	2ª Reg. B	3rd	
1985–86	7	2ª Reg.	9th	
1986–87	7	2ª Reg.	8th	
1987–88	7	2ª Reg.	4th	
1988–89	7	2ª Reg.	13th	
1989–90	7	2ª Reg.	7th	

Season	Tier	Division	Place	Copa del Rey
1990–91	7	2ª Reg.	16th	
1991–92	7	2ª Reg.	12th	
1992–93	7	2ª Reg.	4th	
1993–94	6	1ª Reg.	9th	
1994–95	6	1ª Reg.	6th	
1995–96	6	1ª Reg.	1st	
1996–97	5	Reg. Pref.	12th	
1997–98	5	Reg. Pref.	12th	
1998–99	5	Reg. Pref.	18th	
1999–2000	6	1ª Reg.	1st	
2000–01	5	Reg. Pref.	7th	
2001–02	5	Reg. Pref.	11th	
2002–03	5	Reg. Pref.	9th	
2003–04	5	Reg. Pref.	10th	
2004–05	5	Reg. Pref.	9th	
2005–06	5	Reg. Pref.	8th	
2006–07	5	Reg. Pref.	3rd	
2007–08	4	3ª	14th	
2008–09	4	3ª	14th	
2009–10	4	3ª	17th	

Season	Tier	Division	Place	Copa del Rey
2010–11	5	Reg. Pref.	1st	
2011–12	4	3ª	3rd	
2012–13	4	3ª	9th	
2013–14	4	3ª	16th	
2014–15	4	3ª	7th	
2015–16	4	3ª	14th	
2016–17	4	3ª	17th	
2017–18	5	Reg. Pref.	7th	
2018–19	5	Reg. Pref.	1st	
2019–20	4	3ª	5th	
2020–21	4	3ª	2nd / 4th	
2021–22	5	3ª RFEF	6th	
2022–23	5	3ª Fed.	13th	
2023–24	5	3ª Fed.	2nd	
2024–25	5	3ª Fed.	3rd	First round
2025–26	5	3ª Fed.	2nd	
2026–27	5	3ª Fed.		First round

- 11 seasons in Tercera División
- 6 seasons in Tercera Federación/Tercera División RFEF
