= Carlos Rubén =

Spanish footballer (born 1983)

Personal information
- Full name: Carlos Rubén Esteban Rodríguez
- Date of birth: 26 March 1983 (age 43)
- Place of birth: El Real de la Jara, Spain
- Height: 1.78 m (5 ft 10 in)
- Position: Attacking midfielder

Youth career
- Monesterio
- 2000–2002: Zaragoza

Senior career*
Years	Team	Apps	(Gls)
2002–2005	Zaragoza B	82	(9)
2005–2008	Mérida	85	(11)
2008–2011	Eibar	37	(3)
2009–2010	→ Guijuelo (loan)	13	(3)
2011–2013	Extremadura	46	(15)
2013–2015	Guijuelo	57	(8)
2015–2017	Extremadura	60	(2)
2017–2023	Guijuelo	149	(5)
- * Club domestic league appearances and goals

Carlos Rubén Esteban Rodríguez (born 26 March 1983), known as Carlos Rubén, is a Spanish former footballer who played as an attacking midfielder.

== Club career ==
Born in El Real de la Jara, Province of Seville, Carlos Rubén finished his formative with Real Zaragoza, and made his senior debuts with the reserves in the 2002–03 season, in Segunda División B. In the 2005 summer he joined Mérida UD, also in the third level.

On 19 June 2008 Carlos Rubén signed a two-year deal with SD Eibar, in Segunda División. On 3 September he played his first game as a professional, starting in a 0–1 away loss against CD Castellón for the campaign's Copa del Rey; five days later he scored twice in his league debut, a 3–2 home win over CD Tenerife.

On 30 January 2010, Carlos Rubén was loaned to CD Guijuelo. In the following year, after featuring rarely for the Basque, he joined Extremadura UD.

On 21 July 2013 Carlos Rubén signed with former club Guijuelo, still in the third level
