= 2011–12 Tercera División =

Tercera División
- Season: 2011–12
- Promoted: Noja; Constància; Prat; Marino; Ourense; Arroyo; SD Logroñés; Caudal; Loja; Tudelano; San Fernando; Fuenlabrada; Barakaldo; Izarra; Binissalem; Peña Sport; Yeclano; Atlético Sanluqueño

The 2011–12 Tercera División was the fourth tier of football in Spain. Play started on 19 August 2011 and the season ended on 24 June 2012 with the promotion play-off finals.

== Overview ==
There were 363 clubs competing in Tercera División (Third division) in the 2011–12 season, divided into 18 regional groups, accommodating between 19 and 22 clubs.

The following clubs finished as champions of their respective groups

| Group | Team |
|---|---|
| 1 | Ourense |
| 2 | Caudal |
| 3 | Noja |
| 4 | Laudio |
| 5 | AE Prat |
| 6 | Catarroja |
| 7 | Fuenlabrada |
| 8 | Real Valladolid B |
| 9 | Loja |

| Group | Team |
|---|---|
| 10 | Atlético Sanluqueño |
| 11 | Constància |
| 12 | Marino |
| 13 | Yeclano |
| 14 | Arroyo |
| 15 | Peña Sport |
| 16 | SD Logroñés |
| 17 | Ejea |
| 18 | Villarrobledo |

The 18 group champion clubs participated in the Group winners promotion play-off and the losers from these 9 play-off ties then proceeded to the Non-champions promotion play-off with clubs finishing second third and fourth.

== League standings ==
=== Group 1 - Galicia ===
| Pos | Team | Pld | W | D | L | GF | GA | GD | Pts | Qualification or relegation |
|---|---|---|---|---|---|---|---|---|---|---|
| 1 | Ourense (P) | 38 | 22 | 10 | 6 | 49 | 25 | +24 | 76 | Qualification to group champions' playoffs |
| 2 | Alondras | 38 | 21 | 10 | 7 | 68 | 41 | +27 | 73 | Qualification to promotion playoffs |
| 3 | Cerceda | 38 | 20 | 10 | 8 | 47 | 29 | +18 | 70 | Qualification to promotion playoffs |
| 4 | Pontevedra | 38 | 21 | 7 | 10 | 54 | 34 | +20 | 70 | Qualification to promotion playoffs |
| 5 | Racing Villalbés | 38 | 20 | 7 | 11 | 57 | 45 | +12 | 67 | |
| 6 | Deportivo B | 38 | 19 | 8 | 11 | 56 | 33 | +23 | 65 | |
| 7 | Rápido Bouzas | 38 | 16 | 8 | 14 | 52 | 50 | +2 | 56 | |
| 8 | Racing Ferrol | 38 | 14 | 13 | 11 | 55 | 41 | +14 | 55 | |
| 9 | Villalonga | 38 | 15 | 5 | 18 | 45 | 48 | −3 | 50 | |
| 10 | Dorneda | 38 | 12 | 13 | 13 | 39 | 47 | −8 | 49 | |
| 11 | Somozas | 38 | 12 | 12 | 14 | 50 | 51 | −1 | 48 | |
| 12 | Órdenes | 38 | 12 | 10 | 16 | 40 | 47 | −7 | 46 | |
| 13 | Bergantiños | 38 | 12 | 9 | 17 | 37 | 44 | −7 | 45 | |
| 14 | Negreira | 38 | 10 | 14 | 14 | 42 | 52 | −10 | 44 | |
| 15 | Betanzos | 38 | 12 | 6 | 20 | 43 | 53 | −10 | 42 | |
| 16 | As Pontes | 38 | 10 | 11 | 17 | 47 | 53 | −6 | 41 | |
| 17 | Estradense (R) | 38 | 11 | 8 | 19 | 37 | 52 | −15 | 41 | Relegation to Regional Leagues |
| 18 | Cultural Areas (R) | 38 | 10 | 10 | 18 | 40 | 58 | −18 | 40 | Relegation to Regional Leagues |
| 19 | Lalín (R) | 38 | 10 | 9 | 19 | 30 | 53 | −23 | 39 | Relegation to Regional Leagues |
| 20 | Xuventú Sanxenxo (R) | 38 | 6 | 10 | 22 | 33 | 65 | −32 | 28 | Relegation to Regional Leagues |

(P) Promoted; (R) Relegated

=== Group 2 - Asturias ===
| Pos | Team | Pld | W | D | L | GF | GA | GD | Pts | Qualification or relegation |
|---|---|---|---|---|---|---|---|---|---|---|
| 1 | Caudal (P) | 38 | 30 | 3 | 5 | 93 | 21 | +72 | 93 | Qualification to group champions' playoffs |
| 2 | Avilés (Note: Avilés promoted to Segunda División B after buying a vacant place left by an administrative relegation) (P) | 38 | 28 | 5 | 5 | 85 | 27 | +58 | 89 | Qualification to promotion playoffs |
| 3 | Langreo | 38 | 21 | 9 | 8 | 61 | 29 | +32 | 72 | Qualification to promotion playoffs |
| 4 | Tuilla | 38 | 19 | 8 | 11 | 50 | 38 | +12 | 65 | Qualification to promotion playoffs |
| 5 | Condal | 38 | 17 | 11 | 10 | 48 | 37 | +11 | 62 | |
| 6 | Candás | 38 | 17 | 10 | 11 | 52 | 41 | +11 | 61 | |
| 7 | Luarca | 38 | 15 | 11 | 12 | 37 | 40 | −3 | 56 | |
| 8 | Universidad Oviedo | 38 | 17 | 5 | 16 | 59 | 54 | +5 | 56 | |
| 9 | Llanes | 38 | 14 | 13 | 11 | 46 | 41 | +5 | 55 | |
| 10 | Cudillero | 38 | 15 | 10 | 13 | 53 | 40 | +13 | 55 | |
| 11 | Covadonga | 38 | 14 | 10 | 14 | 66 | 55 | +11 | 52 | |
| 12 | Navia | 38 | 12 | 10 | 16 | 36 | 55 | −19 | 46 | |
| 13 | Gijón Industrial | 38 | 11 | 12 | 15 | 35 | 52 | −17 | 45 | |
| 14 | Lealtad | 38 | 14 | 2 | 22 | 42 | 63 | −21 | 44 | |
| 15 | Navarro | 38 | 12 | 6 | 20 | 44 | 60 | −16 | 42 | |
| 16 | Ceares | 38 | 12 | 4 | 22 | 40 | 62 | −22 | 40 | |
| 17 | Oviedo B | 38 | 10 | 10 | 18 | 40 | 55 | −15 | 40 | |
| 18 | Nalón (R) | 38 | 10 | 7 | 21 | 42 | 72 | −30 | 37 | Relegation to Regional Leagues |
| 19 | Pumarín (R) | 38 | 8 | 13 | 17 | 31 | 51 | −20 | 37 | Relegation to Regional Leagues |
| 20 | Colloto (R) | 38 | 3 | 3 | 32 | 31 | 98 | −67 | 12 | Relegation to Regional Leagues |

(P) Promoted; (R) Relegated

=== Group 3 - Cantabria ===
| Pos | Team | Pld | W | D | L | GF | GA | GD | Pts | Qualification or relegation |
|---|---|---|---|---|---|---|---|---|---|---|
| 1 | Noja (P) | 38 | 27 | 6 | 5 | 102 | 30 | +72 | 87 | Qualification to group champions' playoffs |
| 2 | Laredo | 38 | 26 | 7 | 5 | 85 | 40 | +45 | 85 | Qualification to promotion playoffs |
| 3 | Racing B (Note: Racing B promoted to Segunda División B after buying a vacant place left by an administrative relegation) (P) | 38 | 22 | 12 | 4 | 91 | 30 | +61 | 78 | Qualification to promotion playoffs |
| 4 | Cayón | 38 | 23 | 9 | 6 | 58 | 36 | +22 | 78 | Qualification to promotion playoffs |
| 5 | Tropezón | 38 | 23 | 6 | 9 | 84 | 43 | +41 | 75 | |
| 6 | Escobedo | 38 | 20 | 8 | 10 | 63 | 50 | +13 | 68 | |
| 7 | Siete Villas | 38 | 19 | 8 | 11 | 61 | 49 | +12 | 65 | |
| 8 | Rayo Cantabria | 38 | 16 | 11 | 11 | 75 | 53 | +22 | 59 | |
| 9 | Barreda Balompié | 38 | 13 | 11 | 14 | 58 | 60 | −2 | 50 | |
| 10 | Castro | 38 | 14 | 6 | 18 | 62 | 63 | −1 | 48 | |
| 11 | Guarnizo | 38 | 11 | 12 | 15 | 59 | 58 | +1 | 45 | |
| 12 | Vimenor | 38 | 13 | 6 | 19 | 45 | 65 | −20 | 45 | |
| 13 | Pontejos | 38 | 10 | 11 | 17 | 50 | 65 | −15 | 41 | |
| 14 | Ribamontán al Mar | 38 | 10 | 10 | 18 | 41 | 71 | −30 | 40 | |
| 15 | Bezana | 38 | 9 | 11 | 18 | 43 | 66 | −23 | 38 | |
| 16 | Atlético Albericia | 38 | 9 | 11 | 18 | 50 | 69 | −19 | 38 | |
| 17 | San Martín | 38 | 10 | 4 | 24 | 44 | 68 | −24 | 34 | |
| 18 | Buelna (R) | 38 | 8 | 9 | 21 | 36 | 76 | −40 | 33 | Relegation to Regional Leagues |
| 19 | Barquereño (R) | 38 | 7 | 8 | 23 | 35 | 72 | −37 | 29 | Relegation to Regional Leagues |
| 20 | Arenas de Frajanas (R) | 38 | 5 | 4 | 29 | 30 | 108 | −78 | 19 | Relegation to Regional Leagues |

(P) Promoted; (R) Relegated

=== Group 4 - Basque Country ===
| Pos | Team | Pld | W | D | L | GF | GA | GD | Pts | Qualification or relegation |
|---|---|---|---|---|---|---|---|---|---|---|
| 1 | Laudio | 38 | 24 | 5 | 9 | 70 | 24 | +46 | 77 | Qualification to group champions' playoffs |
| 2 | Barakaldo (P) | 38 | 22 | 10 | 6 | 58 | 29 | +29 | 76 | Qualification to promotion playoffs |
| 3 | Portugalete | 38 | 21 | 11 | 6 | 60 | 29 | +31 | 74 | Qualification to promotion playoffs |
| 4 | Beasain | 38 | 20 | 12 | 6 | 58 | 34 | +24 | 72 | Qualification to promotion playoffs |
| 5 | Zalla | 38 | 20 | 12 | 6 | 57 | 34 | +23 | 72 | |
| 6 | Gernika | 38 | 18 | 10 | 10 | 50 | 37 | +13 | 64 | |
| 7 | Durango | 38 | 18 | 9 | 11 | 49 | 41 | +8 | 63 | |
| 8 | Leioa | 38 | 12 | 19 | 7 | 45 | 37 | +8 | 55 | |
| 9 | Zamudio | 38 | 14 | 12 | 12 | 42 | 43 | −1 | 54 | |
| 10 | Basconia | 38 | 13 | 8 | 17 | 67 | 67 | 0 | 47 | |
| 11 | Lagun Onak | 38 | 10 | 16 | 12 | 29 | 31 | −2 | 46 | |
| 12 | Elgoibar | 38 | 12 | 9 | 17 | 41 | 49 | −8 | 45 | |
| 13 | Eibar B (D) | 38 | 10 | 14 | 14 | 36 | 46 | −10 | 44 | Dissolved after the end of the season |
| 14 | Arenas de Getxo | 38 | 11 | 10 | 17 | 45 | 46 | −1 | 43 | |
| 15 | Santutxu | 38 | 9 | 13 | 16 | 36 | 56 | −20 | 40 | |
| 16 | Balmaseda | 38 | 8 | 16 | 14 | 48 | 57 | −9 | 40 | |
| 17 | Alavés B | 38 | 11 | 7 | 20 | 49 | 71 | −22 | 40 | |
| 18 | Vitoria (R) | 38 | 6 | 13 | 19 | 43 | 66 | −23 | 31 | Relegation to Regional Leagues |
| 19 | Hernani (R) | 38 | 6 | 8 | 24 | 31 | 71 | −40 | 26 | Relegation to Regional Leagues |
| 20 | Zarautz (R) | 38 | 4 | 8 | 26 | 28 | 74 | −46 | 20 | Relegation to Regional Leagues |

(D) Dissolved; (P) Promoted; (R) Relegated

=== Group 5 - Catalonia ===
| Pos | Team | Pld | W | D | L | GF | GA | GD | Pts | Qualification or relegation |
|---|---|---|---|---|---|---|---|---|---|---|
| 1 | Prat (P) | 38 | 22 | 9 | 7 | 57 | 27 | +30 | 75 | Qualification to group champions' playoffs |
| 2 | Espanyol B (Note: Espanyol B promoted to Segunda División B after buying a vacant place left by an administrative relegation) (P) | 38 | 19 | 13 | 6 | 68 | 30 | +38 | 70 | Qualification to promotion playoffs |
| 3 | Manlleu | 38 | 18 | 11 | 9 | 73 | 48 | +25 | 65 | Qualification to promotion playoffs |
| 4 | Pobla de Mafumet | 38 | 18 | 10 | 10 | 52 | 27 | +25 | 64 | Qualification to promotion playoffs |
| 5 | Cornellà | 38 | 16 | 14 | 8 | 52 | 35 | +17 | 62 | |
| 6 | Santboià | 38 | 16 | 10 | 12 | 47 | 43 | +4 | 58 | |
| 7 | Terrassa | 38 | 16 | 10 | 12 | 57 | 55 | +2 | 58 | |
| 8 | Vilafranca | 38 | 15 | 8 | 15 | 51 | 61 | −10 | 53 | |
| 9 | Gavà | 38 | 14 | 11 | 13 | 49 | 50 | −1 | 53 | |
| 10 | Olot | 38 | 13 | 12 | 13 | 53 | 54 | −1 | 51 | |
| 11 | Rubí | 38 | 14 | 8 | 16 | 61 | 54 | +7 | 50 | |
| 12 | Balaguer | 38 | 13 | 10 | 15 | 36 | 52 | −16 | 49 | |
| 13 | Castelldefels | 38 | 13 | 10 | 15 | 43 | 47 | −4 | 49 | |
| 14 | Vic | 38 | 12 | 11 | 15 | 44 | 50 | −6 | 47 | |
| 15 | Muntanyesa | 38 | 11 | 14 | 13 | 42 | 54 | −12 | 47 | |
| 16 | Europa | 38 | 12 | 10 | 16 | 38 | 46 | −8 | 46 | |
| 17 | Gramenet | 38 | 11 | 10 | 17 | 45 | 52 | −7 | 43 | |
| 18 | Vilanova (R) | 38 | 10 | 11 | 17 | 44 | 58 | −14 | 41 | Relegation to Regional Leagues |
| 19 | Amposta (R) | 38 | 8 | 7 | 23 | 52 | 85 | −33 | 31 | Relegation to Regional Leagues |
| 20 | Masnou (R) | 38 | 5 | 9 | 24 | 32 | 68 | −36 | 24 | Relegation to Regional Leagues |

(P) Promoted; (R) Relegated

=== Group 6 - Valencian Community ===
| Pos | Team | Pld | W | D | L | GF | GA | GD | Pts | Qualification or relegation |
|---|---|---|---|---|---|---|---|---|---|---|
| 1 | Catarroja | 42 | 27 | 11 | 4 | 78 | 34 | +44 | 92 | Qualification to group champions' playoffs |
| 2 | Levante B (Note: Levante B promoted to Segunda División B after buying a vacant place left by an administrative relegation) (P) | 42 | 28 | 8 | 6 | 74 | 32 | +42 | 92 | Qualification to promotion playoffs |
| 3 | Muro | 42 | 25 | 6 | 11 | 83 | 56 | +27 | 81 | Qualification to promotion playoffs |
| 4 | Alzira | 42 | 22 | 13 | 7 | 62 | 33 | +29 | 79 | Qualification to promotion playoffs |
| 5 | Acero | 42 | 24 | 6 | 12 | 70 | 42 | +28 | 78 | |
| 6 | La Nucía | 42 | 23 | 9 | 10 | 71 | 41 | +30 | 78 | |
| 7 | Torrevieja | 42 | 21 | 11 | 10 | 64 | 36 | +28 | 74 | |
| 8 | Novelda | 42 | 21 | 9 | 12 | 57 | 50 | +7 | 72 | |
| 9 | Castellón | 42 | 20 | 9 | 13 | 47 | 40 | +7 | 66 (Note: Team deducted 3 points due to a non-appearance) | |
| 10 | Jove Español | 42 | 18 | 8 | 16 | 67 | 53 | +14 | 62 | |
| 11 | Villarreal C | 42 | 18 | 8 | 16 | 82 | 59 | +23 | 62 | |
| 12 | Borriol | 42 | 16 | 11 | 15 | 72 | 67 | +5 | 59 | |
| 13 | Atlético Saguntino | 42 | 14 | 10 | 18 | 47 | 50 | −3 | 52 | |
| 14 | Eldense | 42 | 14 | 8 | 20 | 54 | 64 | −10 | 50 | |
| 15 | Ribarroja | 42 | 14 | 7 | 21 | 47 | 50 | −3 | 49 | |
| 16 | Crevillente | 42 | 12 | 11 | 19 | 48 | 66 | −18 | 47 | |
| 17 | Llosa | 42 | 11 | 12 | 19 | 55 | 67 | −12 | 45 | |
| 18 | Requena (R) | 42 | 12 | 7 | 23 | 57 | 72 | −15 | 43 | Relegation to Regional Leagues |
| 19 | Alicante (R) | 42 | 7 | 8 | 27 | 37 | 91 | −54 | 29 | Relegation to Regional Leagues |
| 20 | Mislata (R) | 42 | 7 | 6 | 29 | 45 | 92 | −47 | 27 | Relegation to Regional Leagues |
| 21 | Barrio Cristo (R) | 42 | 5 | 12 | 25 | 35 | 78 | −43 | 27 | Relegation to Regional Leagues |
| 22 | Altea (R) | 42 | 5 | 6 | 31 | 29 | 108 | −79 | 21 | Relegation to Regional Leagues |

(P) Promoted; (R) Relegated

=== Group 7 - Community of Madrid ===
| Pos | Team | Pld | W | D | L | GF | GA | GD | Pts | Qualification or relegation |
|---|---|---|---|---|---|---|---|---|---|---|
| 1 | Fuenlabrada (P) | 38 | 22 | 7 | 9 | 60 | 33 | +27 | 73 | Qualification to group champions' playoffs |
| 2 | Real Madrid C (Note: Real Madrid C promoted to Segunda División B after buying a vacant place left by an administrative relegation) (P) | 38 | 19 | 10 | 9 | 65 | 33 | +32 | 67 | Qualification to promotion playoffs |
| 3 | Puerta Bonita | 38 | 18 | 12 | 8 | 42 | 32 | +10 | 66 | Qualification to promotion playoffs |
| 4 | Parla | 38 | 18 | 10 | 10 | 60 | 39 | +21 | 64 | Qualification to promotion playoffs |
| 5 | Colmenar Viejo | 38 | 17 | 11 | 10 | 59 | 42 | +17 | 62 | |
| 6 | Inter de Madrid | 38 | 16 | 13 | 9 | 46 | 40 | +6 | 61 | |
| 7 | Carabanchel | 38 | 16 | 12 | 10 | 40 | 32 | +8 | 60 | |
| 8 | Alcobendas | 38 | 15 | 11 | 12 | 52 | 43 | +9 | 56 | |
| 9 | Pozuelo de Alarcón | 38 | 15 | 10 | 13 | 47 | 41 | +6 | 55 | |
| 10 | Colonia Moscardó | 38 | 13 | 14 | 11 | 42 | 31 | +11 | 53 | |
| 11 | Rayo Majadahonda | 38 | 12 | 16 | 10 | 52 | 38 | +14 | 52 | |
| 12 | Unión Adarve | 38 | 13 | 13 | 12 | 32 | 34 | −2 | 52 | |
| 13 | Atlético Madrid C | 38 | 12 | 12 | 14 | 49 | 52 | −3 | 48 | |
| 14 | Villaviciosa | 38 | 13 | 8 | 17 | 34 | 48 | −14 | 47 | |
| 15 | Trival Valderas | 38 | 10 | 16 | 12 | 50 | 52 | −2 | 46 | |
| 16 | Pinto | 38 | 12 | 9 | 17 | 42 | 53 | −11 | 45 | |
| 17 | Móstoles (R) | 38 | 11 | 9 | 18 | 38 | 60 | −22 | 39 (Note: Team deducted 3 points) | Relegation to Regional Leagues |
| 18 | Navalcarnero (R) | 38 | 8 | 10 | 20 | 41 | 64 | −23 | 34 | Relegation to Regional Leagues |
| 19 | Vicálvaro (R) | 38 | 7 | 8 | 23 | 28 | 69 | −41 | 29 | Relegation to Regional Leagues |
| 20 | Fortuna (R) | 38 | 4 | 7 | 27 | 17 | 60 | −43 | 19 | Relegation to Regional Leagues |

(P) Promoted; (R) Relegated

=== Group 8 - Castilla and León ===
| Pos | Team | Pld | W | D | L | GF | GA | GD | Pts | Qualification or relegation |
|---|---|---|---|---|---|---|---|---|---|---|
| 1 | Valladolid B | 40 | 26 | 8 | 6 | 81 | 42 | +39 | 86 | Qualification to group champions' playoffs |
| 2 | Real Ávila | 40 | 26 | 6 | 8 | 84 | 43 | +41 | 84 | Qualification to promotion playoffs |
| 3 | Cultural Leonesa | 40 | 25 | 7 | 8 | 78 | 38 | +40 | 82 | Qualification to promotion playoffs |
| 4 | Villaralbo | 40 | 23 | 10 | 7 | 75 | 38 | +37 | 79 | Qualification to promotion playoffs |
| 5 | Bembibre | 40 | 23 | 9 | 8 | 77 | 35 | +42 | 78 | |
| 6 | Atlético Astorga | 40 | 22 | 10 | 8 | 80 | 37 | +43 | 76 | |
| 7 | Virgen del Camino | 40 | 18 | 7 | 15 | 62 | 53 | +9 | 61 | |
| 8 | Íscar (Note: Íscar resigned from Tercera División at the end of the season and thus relegated to Preferente) (R) | 40 | 18 | 7 | 15 | 55 | 65 | −10 | 61 | Relegation to Regional Leagues |
| 9 | Cristo Atlético | 40 | 14 | 12 | 14 | 58 | 55 | +3 | 54 | |
| 10 | Numancia B | 40 | 14 | 11 | 15 | 61 | 62 | −1 | 53 | |
| 11 | La Granja | 40 | 13 | 10 | 17 | 42 | 43 | −1 | 49 | |
| 12 | Almazán | 40 | 12 | 13 | 15 | 42 | 59 | −17 | 49 | |
| 13 | Racing Lermeño | 40 | 13 | 9 | 18 | 43 | 67 | −24 | 48 | |
| 14 | Salamanca B | 40 | 15 | 2 | 23 | 50 | 59 | −9 | 47 | |
| 15 | Tordesillas (R) | 40 | 11 | 11 | 18 | 44 | 63 | −19 | 44 | Relegation to Regional Leagues |
| 16 | CD Burgos (Note: Due to Burgos relegation from Segunda División B to this group, the reserve team, CD Burgos, was forced to relegate to Primera Regional) (R) | 40 | 11 | 10 | 19 | 48 | 56 | −8 | 43 | Relegation to Regional Leagues |
| 17 | Aguilar (R) | 40 | 9 | 13 | 18 | 49 | 66 | −17 | 40 | Relegation to Regional Leagues |
| 18 | Huracán Z (R) | 40 | 11 | 7 | 22 | 47 | 75 | −28 | 40 | Relegation to Regional Leagues |
| 19 | Burgos Promesas (R) | 40 | 10 | 9 | 21 | 44 | 64 | −20 | 39 | Relegation to Regional Leagues |
| 20 | Béjar Industrial (R) | 40 | 9 | 11 | 20 | 52 | 84 | −32 | 38 | Relegation to Regional Leagues |
| 21 | Ponferradina B (R) | 40 | 3 | 6 | 31 | 34 | 102 | −68 | 15 | Relegation to Regional Leagues |

(R) Relegated

=== Group 9 - Eastern Andalusia and Melilla ===
| Pos | Team | Pld | W | D | L | GF | GA | GD | Pts | Qualification or relegation |
|---|---|---|---|---|---|---|---|---|---|---|
| 1 | Loja (P) | 40 | 26 | 8 | 6 | 87 | 33 | +54 | 86 | Qualification to group champions' playoffs |
| 2 | Unión Estepona | 40 | 26 | 7 | 7 | 76 | 37 | +39 | 85 | Qualification to promotion playoffs |
| 3 | Marbella | 40 | 24 | 6 | 10 | 66 | 28 | +38 | 78 | Qualification to promotion playoffs |
| 4 | Maracena | 40 | 24 | 6 | 10 | 66 | 42 | +24 | 78 | Qualification to promotion playoffs |
| 5 | Atlético Malagueño | 40 | 22 | 10 | 8 | 79 | 37 | +42 | 76 | |
| 6 | Comarca Níjar | 40 | 20 | 10 | 10 | 57 | 34 | +23 | 70 | |
| 7 | Mancha Real | 40 | 20 | 10 | 10 | 53 | 34 | +19 | 70 | |
| 8 | San Pedro | 40 | 20 | 7 | 13 | 68 | 47 | +21 | 67 | |
| 9 | El Palo | 40 | 19 | 8 | 13 | 63 | 57 | +6 | 65 | |
| 10 | Martos | 40 | 18 | 5 | 17 | 49 | 45 | +4 | 59 | |
| 11 | Casino Real | 40 | 14 | 12 | 14 | 44 | 51 | −7 | 54 | |
| 12 | Ronda | 40 | 13 | 12 | 15 | 49 | 60 | −11 | 51 | |
| 13 | Alhaurín Torre | 40 | 13 | 11 | 16 | 59 | 63 | −4 | 50 | |
| 14 | Huétor Tájar | 40 | 12 | 14 | 14 | 50 | 56 | −6 | 50 | |
| 15 | Motril (D) | 40 | 13 | 8 | 19 | 51 | 47 | +4 | 47 | Dissolved after the end of the season |
| 16 | Nerja (Note: Team withdrawn from the competition after the end of the season and relegated to 1ª Andaluza) (R) | 40 | 11 | 13 | 16 | 41 | 57 | −16 | 46 | Relegation to Regional Leagues |
| 17 | Vélez | 40 | 11 | 9 | 20 | 38 | 60 | −22 | 42 | |
| 18 | Arenas Armilla (R) | 40 | 9 | 10 | 21 | 35 | 51 | −16 | 37 | Relegation to Regional Leagues |
| 19 | Antequera (R) | 40 | 9 | 10 | 21 | 47 | 70 | −23 | 37 | Relegation to Regional Leagues |
| 20 | Ciudad Vícar (Note: Team withdrawn from the competition and consequently relegated to 1ª Andaluza) (R) | 40 | 5 | 3 | 32 | 22 | 78 | −56 | 18 | Relegation to Regional Leagues |
| 21 | Carboneras (Note: Team withdrawn from the competition and consequently relegated to 1ª Andaluza) (R) | 40 | 1 | 1 | 38 | 6 | 119 | −113 | 4 | Relegation to Regional Leagues |

(D) Dissolved; (P) Promoted; (R) Relegated

=== Group 10 - Western Andalusia and Ceuta ===
| Pos | Team | Pld | W | D | L | GF | GA | GD | Pts | Qualification or relegation |
|---|---|---|---|---|---|---|---|---|---|---|
| 1 | Atlético Sanluqueño (P) | 38 | 28 | 5 | 5 | 81 | 32 | +49 | 89 | Qualification to group champions' playoffs |
| 2 | San Fernando (P) | 38 | 22 | 8 | 8 | 88 | 52 | +36 | 74 | Qualification to promotion playoffs |
| 3 | Mairena | 38 | 20 | 11 | 7 | 64 | 32 | +32 | 71 | Qualification to promotion playoffs |
| 4 | Coria | 38 | 20 | 8 | 10 | 72 | 46 | +26 | 68 | Qualification to promotion playoffs |
| 5 | Sevilla C | 38 | 20 | 6 | 12 | 67 | 46 | +21 | 66 | |
| 6 | Algeciras | 38 | 17 | 8 | 13 | 57 | 50 | +7 | 59 | |
| 7 | Alcalá | 38 | 13 | 18 | 7 | 58 | 52 | +6 | 57 | |
| 8 | Recreativo B | 38 | 16 | 6 | 16 | 59 | 55 | +4 | 54 | |
| 9 | Cádiz B | 38 | 13 | 11 | 14 | 53 | 53 | 0 | 50 | |
| 10 | Córdoba B | 38 | 11 | 12 | 15 | 35 | 37 | −2 | 45 | |
| 11 | Conil | 38 | 11 | 12 | 15 | 47 | 68 | −21 | 45 | |
| 12 | Pozoblanco | 38 | 10 | 15 | 13 | 47 | 49 | −2 | 45 | |
| 13 | Antoniano | 38 | 10 | 13 | 15 | 31 | 45 | −14 | 43 | |
| 14 | San Roque | 38 | 11 | 9 | 18 | 53 | 67 | −14 | 42 | |
| 15 | Arcos | 38 | 9 | 13 | 16 | 45 | 63 | −18 | 40 | |
| 16 | Portuense | 38 | 8 | 15 | 15 | 41 | 53 | −12 | 39 | |
| 17 | Ayamonte | 38 | 10 | 8 | 20 | 46 | 72 | −26 | 38 | |
| 18 | Murallas (R) | 38 | 9 | 11 | 18 | 34 | 51 | −17 | 38 | Relegation to Regional Leagues |
| 19 | Marinaleda (R) | 38 | 9 | 11 | 18 | 39 | 59 | −20 | 38 | Relegation to Regional Leagues |
| 20 | Peña Rociera (R) | 38 | 9 | 8 | 21 | 40 | 75 | −35 | 35 | Relegation to Regional Leagues |

(P) Promoted; (R) Relegated

=== Group 11 - Balearic Islands ===
| Pos | Team | Pld | W | D | L | GF | GA | GD | Pts | Qualification or relegation |
|---|---|---|---|---|---|---|---|---|---|---|
| 1 | Constancia (P) | 38 | 24 | 13 | 1 | 68 | 21 | +47 | 85 | Qualification to group champions' playoffs |
| 2 | Binissalem (P) | 38 | 24 | 8 | 6 | 59 | 26 | +33 | 80 | Qualification to promotion playoffs |
| 3 | Llosetense | 38 | 23 | 7 | 8 | 81 | 50 | +31 | 76 | Qualification to promotion playoffs |
| 4 | Montuïri | 38 | 22 | 9 | 7 | 66 | 28 | +38 | 75 | Qualification to promotion playoffs |
| 5 | San Rafael | 38 | 20 | 12 | 6 | 56 | 23 | +33 | 72 | |
| 6 | Santa Eulalia | 38 | 20 | 7 | 11 | 61 | 35 | +26 | 67 | |
| 7 | Santanyí | 38 | 19 | 10 | 9 | 65 | 40 | +25 | 67 | |
| 8 | Campos | 38 | 14 | 14 | 10 | 38 | 31 | +7 | 56 | |
| 9 | Poblense | 38 | 14 | 13 | 11 | 49 | 39 | +10 | 55 | |
| 10 | Mercadal | 38 | 14 | 10 | 14 | 42 | 47 | −5 | 52 | |
| 11 | Collerense | 38 | 11 | 12 | 15 | 46 | 58 | −12 | 45 | |
| 12 | Son Ferrer | 38 | 10 | 12 | 16 | 28 | 50 | −22 | 42 | |
| 13 | Felanitx | 38 | 10 | 10 | 18 | 35 | 60 | −25 | 40 | |
| 14 | Alcúdia | 38 | 10 | 9 | 19 | 42 | 54 | −12 | 39 | |
| 15 | Espanya | 38 | 11 | 6 | 21 | 44 | 66 | −22 | 39 | |
| 16 | Atlético Isleño | 38 | 9 | 11 | 18 | 46 | 60 | −14 | 38 | |
| 17 | Ferriolense | 38 | 10 | 6 | 22 | 44 | 60 | −16 | 36 | |
| 18 | Platges Calvià (R) | 38 | 9 | 7 | 22 | 41 | 65 | −24 | 34 | Relegation to Regional Leagues |
| 19 | Ferreries (R) | 38 | 5 | 8 | 25 | 27 | 87 | −60 | 23 | Relegation to Regional Leagues |
| 20 | Alaior (R) | 38 | 4 | 10 | 24 | 37 | 75 | −38 | 22 | Relegation to Regional Leagues |

(P) Promoted; (R) Relegated

=== Group 12 - Canary Islands ===
| Pos | Team | Pld | W | D | L | GF | GA | GD | Pts | Qualification or relegation |
|---|---|---|---|---|---|---|---|---|---|---|
| 1 | Marino (P) | 38 | 23 | 7 | 8 | 77 | 35 | +42 | 76 | Qualification to group champions' playoffs |
| 2 | Tenisca | 38 | 22 | 6 | 10 | 60 | 41 | +19 | 72 | Qualification to promotion playoffs |
| 3 | Las Palmas B | 38 | 20 | 11 | 7 | 68 | 29 | +39 | 71 | Qualification to promotion playoffs |
| 4 | Vera | 38 | 20 | 10 | 8 | 68 | 40 | +28 | 70 | Qualification to promotion playoffs |
| 5 | Lanzarote | 38 | 20 | 9 | 9 | 50 | 34 | +16 | 69 | |
| 6 | Granadilla | 38 | 19 | 8 | 11 | 55 | 37 | +18 | 65 | |
| 7 | Estrella | 38 | 18 | 9 | 11 | 47 | 34 | +13 | 63 | |
| 8 | Tenerife B | 38 | 16 | 11 | 11 | 70 | 53 | +17 | 59 | |
| 9 | Corralejo | 38 | 16 | 10 | 12 | 49 | 45 | +4 | 58 | |
| 10 | Telde | 38 | 16 | 6 | 16 | 55 | 52 | +3 | 54 | |
| 11 | San Pedro Mártir | 38 | 11 | 14 | 13 | 50 | 59 | −9 | 47 | |
| 12 | San Andrés Sauces | 38 | 13 | 7 | 18 | 47 | 65 | −18 | 46 | |
| 13 | Mensajero | 38 | 13 | 6 | 19 | 54 | 63 | −9 | 45 | |
| 14 | Villa Santa Brígida | 38 | 12 | 9 | 17 | 56 | 66 | −10 | 45 | |
| 15 | Atlético Victoria | 38 | 11 | 12 | 15 | 45 | 62 | −17 | 45 | |
| 16 | Las Zocas | 38 | 11 | 8 | 19 | 46 | 60 | −14 | 41 | |
| 17 | Tijarafe | 38 | 11 | 5 | 22 | 39 | 67 | −28 | 38 | |
| 18 | Laguna (R) | 38 | 10 | 7 | 21 | 35 | 55 | −20 | 37 | Relegation to Regional Leagues |
| 19 | San José (R) | 38 | 8 | 8 | 22 | 36 | 68 | −32 | 32 | Relegation to Regional Leagues |
| 20 | Charco Pino (R) | 38 | 5 | 7 | 26 | 36 | 78 | −42 | 22 | Relegation to Regional Leagues |

(P) Promoted; (R) Relegated

=== Group 13 - Region of Murcia ===
| Pos | Team | Pld | W | D | L | GF | GA | GD | Pts | Qualification or relegation |
|---|---|---|---|---|---|---|---|---|---|---|
| 1 | Yeclano (P) | 36 | 28 | 4 | 4 | 77 | 27 | +50 | 88 | Qualification to group champions' playoffs |
| 2 | Águilas | 36 | 26 | 5 | 5 | 78 | 34 | +44 | 83 | Qualification to promotion playoffs |
| 3 | Mar Menor | 36 | 25 | 6 | 5 | 82 | 34 | +48 | 81 | Qualification to promotion playoffs |
| 4 | La Hoya | 36 | 25 | 6 | 5 | 81 | 24 | +57 | 81 | Qualification to promotion playoffs |
| 5 | Cieza | 36 | 19 | 9 | 8 | 73 | 42 | +31 | 66 | |
| 6 | UCAM (Note: UCAM Murcia promoted to Segunda División B after buying a vacant place left by an administrative relegation) (P) | 36 | 18 | 7 | 11 | 70 | 39 | +31 | 61 | |
| 7 | Murcia Imperial | 36 | 16 | 8 | 12 | 45 | 36 | +9 | 56 | |
| 8 | Bala Azul | 36 | 15 | 7 | 14 | 49 | 54 | −5 | 52 | |
| 9 | Jumilla | 36 | 14 | 8 | 14 | 56 | 53 | +3 | 50 | |
| 10 | Plus Ultra | 36 | 12 | 6 | 18 | 47 | 58 | −11 | 42 | |
| 11 | Pulpileño | 36 | 10 | 12 | 14 | 53 | 49 | +4 | 42 | |
| 12 | Minera | 36 | 11 | 7 | 18 | 33 | 57 | −24 | 40 | |
| 13 | Pinatar | 36 | 11 | 7 | 18 | 31 | 44 | −13 | 40 | |
| 14 | Fortuna | 36 | 10 | 6 | 20 | 40 | 66 | −26 | 36 | |
| 15 | Molina | 36 | 10 | 4 | 22 | 45 | 81 | −36 | 34 | |
| 16 | Cartagena (R) | 36 | 8 | 6 | 22 | 29 | 61 | −32 | 30 | Relegation to Regional Leagues |
| 17 | Santomera (R) | 36 | 5 | 14 | 17 | 39 | 65 | −26 | 29 | Relegation to Regional Leagues |
| 18 | Base Abarán (R) | 36 | 6 | 7 | 23 | 42 | 81 | −39 | 25 | Relegation to Regional Leagues |
| 19 | Esperanza (R) | 36 | 7 | 3 | 26 | 20 | 85 | −65 | 24 | Relegation to Regional Leagues |

(P) Promoted; (R) Relegated

=== Group 14 - Extremadura ===
| Pos | Team | Pld | W | D | L | GF | GA | GD | Pts | Qualification or relegation |
|---|---|---|---|---|---|---|---|---|---|---|
| 1 | Arroyo (P) | 38 | 30 | 5 | 3 | 100 | 22 | +78 | 95 | Qualification to group champions' playoffs |
| 2 | Díter Zafra | 38 | 25 | 6 | 7 | 63 | 38 | +25 | 81 | Qualification to promotion playoffs |
| 3 | Extremadura | 38 | 23 | 9 | 6 | 75 | 23 | +52 | 78 | Qualification to promotion playoffs |
| 4 | Don Benito | 38 | 23 | 9 | 6 | 63 | 29 | +34 | 78 | Qualification to promotion playoffs |
| 5 | Jerez | 38 | 20 | 9 | 9 | 56 | 34 | +22 | 69 | |
| 6 | Miajadas | 38 | 15 | 11 | 12 | 52 | 52 | 0 | 56 | |
| 7 | Badajoz | 38 | 14 | 11 | 13 | 53 | 49 | +4 | 53 | |
| 8 | Mérida | 38 | 14 | 11 | 13 | 42 | 43 | −1 | 53 | |
| 9 | Coria | 38 | 13 | 11 | 14 | 49 | 55 | −6 | 50 | |
| 10 | Plasencia | 38 | 12 | 9 | 17 | 41 | 62 | −21 | 45 | |
| 11 | Ciudad Plasencia | 38 | 10 | 15 | 13 | 45 | 46 | −1 | 45 | |
| 12 | Valdelacalzada | 38 | 10 | 15 | 13 | 31 | 42 | −11 | 45 | |
| 13 | Santa Amalia | 38 | 11 | 11 | 16 | 53 | 67 | −14 | 44 | |
| 14 | Hernán Cortés | 38 | 10 | 12 | 16 | 28 | 39 | −11 | 42 | |
| 15 | Pueblonuevo | 38 | 11 | 8 | 19 | 59 | 83 | −24 | 41 | |
| 16 | Moralo | 38 | 10 | 10 | 18 | 32 | 43 | −11 | 40 | |
| 17 | San José | 38 | 10 | 9 | 19 | 60 | 67 | −7 | 39 | |
| 18 | Sanvicenteño (R) | 38 | 9 | 9 | 20 | 45 | 77 | −32 | 36 | Relegation to Regional Leagues |
| 19 | Villafranca (R) | 38 | 6 | 11 | 21 | 45 | 74 | −29 | 29 | Relegation to Regional Leagues |
| 20 | Chinato (R) | 38 | 3 | 11 | 24 | 27 | 74 | −47 | 20 | Relegation to Regional Leagues |

(P) Promoted; (R) Relegated

=== Group 15 - Navarra ===
| Pos | Team | Pld | W | D | L | GF | GA | GD | Pts | Qualification or relegation |
|---|---|---|---|---|---|---|---|---|---|---|
| 1 | Peña Sport (P) | 38 | 28 | 8 | 2 | 88 | 35 | +53 | 92 | Qualification to group champions' playoffs |
| 2 | Izarra (P) | 38 | 28 | 6 | 4 | 104 | 33 | +71 | 90 | Qualification to promotion playoffs |
| 3 | Tudelano (P) | 38 | 27 | 7 | 4 | 97 | 26 | +71 | 88 | Qualification to promotion playoffs |
| 4 | Mutilvera | 38 | 25 | 5 | 8 | 71 | 32 | +39 | 80 | Qualification to promotion playoffs |
| 5 | San Juan | 38 | 18 | 12 | 8 | 50 | 36 | +14 | 66 | |
| 6 | Txantrea | 38 | 17 | 9 | 12 | 54 | 38 | +16 | 60 | |
| 7 | Murchante | 38 | 14 | 12 | 12 | 61 | 64 | −3 | 54 | |
| 8 | Cirbonero | 38 | 13 | 14 | 11 | 57 | 53 | +4 | 53 | |
| 9 | Iruña | 38 | 14 | 10 | 14 | 53 | 53 | 0 | 52 | |
| 10 | Pamplona | 38 | 11 | 10 | 17 | 47 | 65 | −18 | 43 | |
| 11 | Oberena | 38 | 11 | 9 | 18 | 48 | 61 | −13 | 42 | |
| 12 | Valle de Egüés | 38 | 9 | 14 | 15 | 43 | 60 | −17 | 41 | |
| 13 | Huarte | 38 | 10 | 11 | 17 | 54 | 60 | −6 | 41 | |
| 14 | Idoya | 38 | 9 | 12 | 17 | 37 | 62 | −25 | 39 | |
| 15 | Burladés | 38 | 10 | 8 | 20 | 40 | 48 | −8 | 38 | |
| 16 | Aoiz | 38 | 8 | 14 | 16 | 49 | 74 | −25 | 38 | |
| 17 | Cortes | 38 | 8 | 13 | 17 | 33 | 63 | −30 | 37 | |
| 18 | Lourdes (R) | 38 | 8 | 9 | 21 | 39 | 77 | −38 | 33 | Relegation to Regional Leagues |
| 19 | Azkoyen (R) | 38 | 8 | 8 | 22 | 35 | 66 | −31 | 32 | Relegation to Regional Leagues |
| 20 | Aluvión (R) | 38 | 4 | 9 | 25 | 33 | 87 | −54 | 21 | Relegation to Regional Leagues |

(P) Promoted; (R) Relegated

=== Group 16 - La Rioja ===
| Pos | Team | Pld | W | D | L | GF | GA | GD | Pts | Qualification or relegation |
|---|---|---|---|---|---|---|---|---|---|---|
| 1 | SD Logroñés (P) | 38 | 30 | 6 | 2 | 91 | 30 | +61 | 96 | Qualification to group champions' playoffs |
| 2 | Alfaro | 38 | 29 | 7 | 2 | 98 | 35 | +63 | 94 | Qualification to promotion playoffs |
| 3 | Haro | 38 | 29 | 5 | 4 | 100 | 19 | +81 | 92 | Qualification to promotion playoffs |
| 4 | Varea | 38 | 25 | 3 | 10 | 93 | 43 | +50 | 78 | Qualification to promotion playoffs |
| 5 | Náxara | 38 | 23 | 6 | 9 | 68 | 40 | +28 | 75 | |
| 6 | Logroñés B (D) | 38 | 21 | 9 | 8 | 72 | 42 | +30 | 72 | Dissolved after the end of the season |
| 7 | Anguiano | 38 | 18 | 12 | 8 | 60 | 35 | +25 | 66 | |
| 8 | Oyonesa | 38 | 17 | 11 | 10 | 65 | 42 | +23 | 62 | |
| 9 | Calahorra | 38 | 16 | 10 | 12 | 64 | 46 | +18 | 58 | |
| 10 | Arnedo | 38 | 13 | 14 | 11 | 48 | 34 | +14 | 53 | |
| 11 | Vianés | 38 | 12 | 8 | 18 | 51 | 60 | −9 | 44 | |
| 12 | River Ebro | 38 | 12 | 6 | 20 | 41 | 67 | −26 | 42 | |
| 13 | Agoncillo | 38 | 9 | 11 | 18 | 35 | 57 | −22 | 38 | |
| 14 | Pradejón | 38 | 10 | 6 | 22 | 39 | 83 | −44 | 36 | |
| 15 | Berceo | 38 | 9 | 7 | 22 | 38 | 61 | −23 | 34 | |
| 16 | San Marcial | 38 | 9 | 7 | 22 | 29 | 75 | −46 | 34 | |
| 17 | Calasancio | 38 | 8 | 7 | 23 | 33 | 62 | −29 | 31 | |
| 18 | Tedeón (R) | 38 | 4 | 9 | 25 | 29 | 88 | −59 | 21 | Relegation to Regional Leagues |
| 19 | Ciudad Alfaro (R) | 38 | 4 | 9 | 25 | 27 | 82 | −55 | 21 | Relegation to Regional Leagues |
| 20 | Bañuelos (R) | 38 | 3 | 5 | 30 | 30 | 110 | −80 | 14 | Relegation to Regional Leagues |

(D) Dissolved; (P) Promoted; (R) Relegated

=== Group 17 - Aragón ===
| Pos | Team | Pld | W | D | L | GF | GA | GD | Pts | Qualification or relegation |
|---|---|---|---|---|---|---|---|---|---|---|
| 1 | Ejea | 38 | 22 | 11 | 5 | 76 | 37 | +39 | 77 | Qualification to group champions' playoffs |
| 2 | Sariñena | 38 | 22 | 10 | 6 | 66 | 27 | +39 | 76 | Qualification to promotion playoffs |
| 3 | Cuarte Industrial | 38 | 21 | 9 | 8 | 68 | 40 | +28 | 72 | Qualification to promotion playoffs |
| 4 | Utebo | 38 | 18 | 13 | 7 | 57 | 33 | +24 | 67 | Qualification to promotion playoffs |
| 5 | Valdefierro | 38 | 19 | 8 | 11 | 52 | 37 | +15 | 65 | |
| 6 | Sabiñánigo | 38 | 17 | 9 | 12 | 57 | 45 | +12 | 60 | |
| 7 | Calatayud | 38 | 15 | 13 | 10 | 46 | 32 | +14 | 58 | |
| 8 | Villanueva | 38 | 16 | 9 | 13 | 60 | 49 | +11 | 57 | |
| 9 | Binéfar | 38 | 14 | 12 | 12 | 45 | 41 | +4 | 54 | |
| 10 | Barbastro | 38 | 13 | 12 | 13 | 60 | 62 | −2 | 51 | |
| 11 | Oliver | 38 | 14 | 9 | 15 | 54 | 56 | −2 | 51 | |
| 12 | Ebro | 38 | 14 | 8 | 16 | 48 | 50 | −2 | 50 | |
| 13 | Atlético Monzón | 38 | 12 | 12 | 14 | 43 | 49 | −6 | 48 | |
| 14 | Tarazona | 38 | 12 | 10 | 16 | 43 | 50 | −7 | 46 | |
| 15 | Robres | 38 | 12 | 9 | 17 | 39 | 52 | −13 | 45 | |
| 16 | Universidad Zaragoza (D) | 38 | 13 | 7 | 18 | 55 | 66 | −11 | 43 (Note: Team deducted 3 points due to a non-appearance) | Dissolved after the end of the season |
| 17 | Tauste (R) | 38 | 10 | 10 | 18 | 52 | 61 | −9 | 40 | Relegation to Regional Leagues |
| 18 | Giner Torrero (R) | 38 | 8 | 7 | 23 | 40 | 71 | −31 | 31 | Relegation to Regional Leagues |
| 19 | Quinto (R) | 38 | 7 | 9 | 22 | 23 | 67 | −44 | 30 | Relegation to Regional Leagues |
| 20 | San José (R) | 38 | 5 | 5 | 28 | 34 | 93 | −59 | 20 | Relegation to Regional Leagues |

(D) Dissolved; (R) Relegated

=== Group 18 - Castilla-La Mancha ===
| Pos | Team | Pld | W | D | L | GF | GA | GD | Pts | Qualification or relegation |
|---|---|---|---|---|---|---|---|---|---|---|
| 1 | Villarrobledo | 38 | 26 | 8 | 4 | 67 | 26 | +41 | 86 | Qualification to group champions' playoffs |
| 2 | Almansa | 38 | 18 | 13 | 7 | 56 | 26 | +30 | 67 | Qualification to promotion playoffs |
| 3 | Azuqueca | 38 | 19 | 10 | 9 | 64 | 39 | +25 | 67 | Qualification to promotion playoffs |
| 4 | Albacete B | 38 | 18 | 13 | 7 | 60 | 25 | +35 | 67 | Qualification to promotion playoffs |
| 5 | Illescas | 38 | 19 | 9 | 10 | 54 | 36 | +18 | 66 | |
| 6 | Villarrubia | 38 | 19 | 9 | 10 | 69 | 44 | +25 | 66 | |
| 7 | Gimnástico Alcázar | 38 | 18 | 10 | 10 | 50 | 34 | +16 | 64 | |
| 8 | Quintanar del Rey | 38 | 15 | 9 | 14 | 57 | 60 | −3 | 54 | |
| 9 | Madridejos | 38 | 13 | 14 | 11 | 50 | 49 | +1 | 53 | |
| 10 | Marchamalo | 38 | 11 | 12 | 15 | 50 | 51 | −1 | 45 | |
| 11 | Torrijos | 38 | 12 | 9 | 17 | 42 | 59 | −17 | 45 | |
| 12 | Manzanares | 38 | 10 | 14 | 14 | 46 | 51 | −5 | 44 | |
| 13 | Hellín | 38 | 9 | 17 | 12 | 37 | 48 | −11 | 44 | |
| 14 | Talavera | 38 | 10 | 13 | 15 | 40 | 46 | −6 | 43 | |
| 15 | Ibañés (R) | 38 | 9 | 16 | 13 | 35 | 57 | −22 | 43 | Relegation to Regional Leagues |
| 16 | Socuéllamos (R) | 38 | 10 | 10 | 18 | 48 | 58 | −10 | 40 | Relegation to Regional Leagues |
| 17 | Tomelloso (R) | 38 | 11 | 7 | 20 | 43 | 57 | −14 | 40 | Relegation to Regional Leagues |
| 18 | La Gineta (R) | 38 | 11 | 6 | 21 | 41 | 63 | −22 | 39 | Relegation to Regional Leagues |
| 19 | Carranque (R) | 38 | 8 | 9 | 21 | 23 | 63 | −40 | 30 (Note: Team deducted 3 points due to a non-appearance) | Relegation to Regional Leagues |
| 20 | Puertollano B (R) | 38 | 7 | 6 | 25 | 38 | 78 | −40 | 27 | Relegation to Regional Leagues |

(R) Relegated

== Promotion play-offs ==
=== Group winners promotion play-off ===
Promoted to Segunda División B
| Noja (9 years later) | Constància (24 years later) | Prat (First time ever) | Marino (19 years later) | Ourense (4 years later) | Arroyo (First time ever) | SD Logroñés (First time ever) | Caudal (1 year later) | Loja (First time ever) |

=== Non-champions promotion play-off ===
Promoted to Segunda División B
| Tudelano (16 years later) | San Fernando (First time ever) | Fuenlabrada (4 years later) | Barakaldo (1 year later) | Izarra (2 years later) | Binissalem (First time ever) | Peña Sport (1 year later) | Yeclano (1 year later) | Atlético Sanluqueño (20 years later) |
