= Muro CF =

Muro
- Full name: Muro Club de Fútbol
- Founded: 1930
- Ground: La Llometa, Muro de Alcoy, Valencia, Spain
- Capacity: 1,000
- Chairman: Marcos Cascant
- Manager: Juan Moreno
- League: Primera FFCV – Group 4
- 2024–25: Primera FFCV – Group 3, 3rd of 16
Home colours	Away colours

Muro Club de Fútbol is a Spanish football team based in Muro de Alcoy, in the autonomous community of Valencia. Founded in 1930, it plays in Primera FFCV – Group 4, holding home games at La Llometa, which has a capacity of 1,000 spectators.

== Season to season ==
Season	Tier	Division	Place	Copa del Rey
1930–1964	—	Regional	—	
1963–64	6	3ª Reg.	2nd	
1964–65	6	3ª Reg.		
1965–66	6	3ª Reg.		
1966–67	6	3ª Reg.		
1967–68	6	3ª Reg.		
1968–69	6	3ª Reg.	5th	
1969–70	6	3ª Reg.		
1970–71	6	2ª Reg.		
1971–72	6	2ª Reg.		
1972–73	6	2ª Reg.		
1973–74	6	2ª Reg.	10th	
1974–75	6	2ª Reg.	6th	
1975–76	6	2ª Reg.	8th	
1976–77	6	2ª Reg.	6th	
1977–78	7	2ª Reg.	2nd	
1978–79	7	2ª Reg.	2nd	
1979–80	6	1ª Reg.	9th	
1980–81	6	1ª Reg.	5th	
1981–82	6	1ª Reg.	6th	

Season	Tier	Division	Place	Copa del Rey
1982–83	6	1ª Reg.	10th	
1983–84	6	1ª Reg.	7th	
1984–85	6	1ª Reg.	7th	
1985–86	6	1ª Reg.	14th	
1986–87	6	1ª Reg.	9th	
1987–88	6	1ª Reg.	12th	
1988–89	6	1ª Reg.	14th	
1989–90	6	1ª Reg.	5th	
1990–91	6	1ª Reg.	7th	
1991–92	6	1ª Reg.	11th	
1992–93	6	1ª Reg.	3rd	
1993–94	6	1ª Reg.	8th	
1994–95	6	1ª Reg.	7th	
1995–96	6	1ª Reg.	5th	
1996–97	6	1ª Reg.	8th	
1997–98	6	1ª Reg.	1st	
1998–99	5	Reg. Pref.	16th	
1999–2000	6	1ª Reg.	9th	
2000–01	6	1ª Reg.	8th	
2001–02	6	1ª Reg.	1st	

Season	Tier	Division	Place	Copa del Rey
2002–03	5	Reg. Pref.	16th	
2003–04	6	1ª Reg.	7th	
2004–05	6	1ª Reg.	1st	
2005–06	5	Reg. Pref.	18th	
2006–07	6	1ª Reg.	2nd	
2007–08	5	Reg. Pref.	13th	
2008–09	5	Reg. Pref.	3rd	
2009–10	5	Reg. Pref.	3rd	
2010–11	5	Reg. Pref.	2nd	
2011–12	4	3ª	3rd	
2012–13	4	3ª	6th	
2013–14	4	3ª	6th	
2014–15	4	3ª	7th	
2015–16	4	3ª	13th	
2016–17	4	3ª	18th	
2017–18	5	Reg. Pref.	12th	
2018–19	5	Reg. Pref.	6th	
2019–20	5	Reg. Pref.	2nd	
2020–21	5	Reg. Pref.	3rd	
2021–22	6	Reg. Pref.	6th	

Season	Tier	Division	Place	Copa del Rey
2022–23	6	Reg. Pref.	18th	
2023–24	7	1ª FFCV	6th	
2024–25	7	1ª FFCV	3rd	
2025–26	7	1ª FFCV	4th	
2026–27	7	1ª FFCV		

- 6 seasons in Tercera División
