= CD Vera (Tenerife) =

Spanish football club

Vera
- Full name: Club Deportivo Vera
- Nicknames: Indios; Azules; Azulones
- Founded: 1 January 1936; 90 years ago
- Ground: Nuevo Salvador Ledesma, Puerto de la Cruz, Tenerife, Canary Islands, Spain
- Capacity: 1,500
- President: Jesús Hernández
- Head coach: Adonay Martín
- League: Interinsular Preferente
- 2025–26: Primera Interinsular – Group 1, 1st of 19 (champions)
Home colours	Away colours

Club Deportivo Vera is a Spanish football team based in Puerto de la Cruz, in the autonomous community of Canary Islands. Founded on 1 January 1936, it plays in Interinsular Preferente, holding home matches at Estadio Nuevo Salvador Ledesma, with a capacity of 1,500 people.

== Season to season ==
Season	Tier	Division	Place	Copa del Rey
1943–44	5	2ª Reg.	3rd	
1944–45	6	3ª Reg.		
1945–46	6	3ª Reg.		
1946–47	5	2ª Reg.	4th	
1947–48	6	3ª Reg.		
1948–49	DNP			
1949–50	6	3ª Reg.		
1950–51	5	2ª Reg.	7th	
1951–52	5	2ª Reg.	5th	
1952–53	5	2ª Reg.	3rd	
1953–54	6	3ª Reg.		
1954–55	5	2ª Reg.		
1955–56	6	3ª Reg.		
1956–57	6	3ª Reg.		
1957–58	6	3ª Reg.		
1958–59	6	3ª Reg.		
1959–60	5	2ª Reg.	7th	
1960–61	5	2ª Reg.	6th	
1961–62	5	2ª Reg.	4th	
1962–63	5	2ª Reg.		

Season	Tier	Division	Place	Copa del Rey
1963–64	5	2ª Reg.	6th	
1964–65	5	2ª Reg.	7th	
1965–66	5	2ª Reg.	11th	
1966–67	5	2ª Reg.	5th	
1967–68	5	2ª Reg.		
1968–69	5	2ª Reg.	10th	
1969–70	5	2ª Reg.	9th	
1970–71	5	2ª Reg.	3rd	
1971–72	5	2ª Reg.		
1972–73	4	1ª Reg.	12th	
1973–74	5	2ª Reg.		
1974–75	5	2ª Reg.		
1975–76	5	2ª Reg.		
1976–77	5	2ª Reg.	2nd	
1977–78	6	1ª Reg.	1st	
1978–79	5	Reg. Pref.	5th	
1979–80	5	Reg. Pref.	11th	
1980–81	5	Reg. Pref.	9th	
1981–82	5	Reg. Pref.	13th	
1982–83	6	1ª Reg.	10th	

Season	Tier	Division	Place	Copa del Rey
1983–84	6	1ª Terr.	6th	
1984–85	6	1ª Terr.	1st	
1985–86	5	Reg. Pref.	5th	
1986–87	5	Reg. Pref.	13th	
1987–88	6	1ª Terr.	10th	
1988–89	6	1ª Terr.	13th	
1989–90	6	1ª Terr.	7th	
1990–91	6	1ª Terr.	9th	
1991–92	6	1ª Terr.	2nd	
1992–93	5	Int. Pref.	10th	
1993–94	5	Int. Pref.	15th	
1994–95	5	Int. Pref.	17th	
1995–96	6	1ª Terr.	8th	
1996–97	6	1ª Terr.	11th	
1997–98	6	1ª Terr.	11th	
1998–99	6	1ª Terr.	3rd	
1999–2000	6	1ª Terr.	3rd	
2000–01	6	1ª Terr.	6th	
2001–02	6	1ª Terr.	2nd	
2002–03	6	1ª Terr.	3rd	

Season	Tier	Division	Place	Copa del Rey
2003–04	6	1ª Terr.	2nd	
2004–05	5	Int. Pref.	19th	
2005–06	6	1ª Int.	4th	
2006–07	6	1ª Int.	1st	
2007–08	5	Int. Pref.	4th	
2008–09	5	Int. Pref.	6th	
2009–10	5	Int. Pref.	1st	
2010–11	4	3ª	11th	
2011–12	4	3ª	4th	
2012–13	4	3ª	16th	
2013–14	4	3ª	17th	
2014–15	4	3ª	17th	
2015–16	4	3ª	12th	
2016–17	4	3ª	17th	
2017–18	4	3ª	18th	
2018–19	5	Int. Pref.	1st	
2019–20	4	3ª	7th	
2020–21	4	3ª	7th	
2021–22	5	3ª RFEF	15th	
2022–23	6	Int. Pref.	2nd	

Season	Tier	Division	Place	Copa del Rey
2023–24	6	Int. Pref.	2nd	
2024–25	6	Int. Pref.	19th	
2025–26	7	1ª Int.		

- 10 seasons in Tercera División
- 1 season in Tercera División RFEF
