= Ander Olaizola =

Spanish footballer

Personal information
- Full name: Ander Olaizola Agirre
- Date of birth: July 24, 1989 (age 37)
- Place of birth: Zarautz, Spain
- Height: 1.82 m (5 ft 11 1/2 in)
- Position: Midfielder

Team information
- Current team: Beasain

Youth career
- Zarautz

Senior career*
Years	Team	Apps	(Gls)
2007–2008	Zarautz	32	(4)
2008–2010	Eibar B	65	(15)
2009–2011	Eibar	5	(0)
2010–2011	→ Barakaldo (loan)	19	(1)
2011–2012	Beasain	36	(12)
2012–2013	Levante B	24	(0)
2013–	Beasain	31	(6)
- * Club domestic league appearances and goals as of 15 May 2014

Ander Olaizola Agirre (born July 24, 1989) is a Spanish footballer who plays for SD Beasain as a midfielder.
