= Catarroja CF =

Spanish football club

Catarroja
- Full name: Catarroja Club de Fútbol
- Founded: 1924
- Ground: Mundial 82, Catarroja, Valencia, Spain
- Capacity: 5,000
- President: (Spain) Toni Barberá
- Head coach: (Spain) Sergio Rey
- League: Segona FFCV – Group 5
- 2024–25: Segona FFCV – Group 5, 3rd of 16
Home colours	Away colours

Catarroja Club de Fútbol is a Spanish football team based in Catarroja, in the autonomous community of Valencia. Founded in 1924 it plays in Segona FFCV – Group 5, holding home games at Estadio Mundial 82, with a capacity of 5,000 seats.

== Season to season ==
Season	Tier	Division	Place	Copa del Rey
1940–41	3	3ª	3rd	
1941–42	3	1ª Reg.	3rd	
1942–43	3	1ª Reg.	8th	
1943–44	5	2ª Reg.		
1944–45	5	2ª Reg.	1st	
1945–46	4	1ª Reg.	5th	
1946–47	4	1ª Reg.	3rd	
1947–48	4	1ª Reg.	1st	
1948–49	4	1ª Reg.	1st	
1949–50	3	3ª	11th	
1950–51	3	3ª	9th	
1951–52	3	3ª	5th	
1952–53	3	3ª	14th	
1953–54	3	3ª	14th	
1954–55	3	3ª	10th	
1955–56	4	1ª Reg.	5th	
1956–57	3	3ª	13th	
1957–58	3	3ª	8th	
1958–59	3	3ª	15th	
1959–60	3	3ª	7th	

Season	Tier	Division	Place	Copa del Rey
1960–61	3	3ª	15th	
1961–62	4	1ª Reg.	6th	
1962–63	4	1ª Reg.	9th	
1963–64	4	1ª Reg.	16th	
1964–65	4	1ª Reg.	13th	
1965–66	4	1ª Reg.	5th	
1966–67	4	1ª Reg.	13th	
1967–68	4	1ª Reg.	19th	
1968–69	5	2ª Reg.	9th	
1969–70	5	2ª Reg.	9th	
1970–71	5	1ª Reg.	5th	
1971–72	5	1ª Reg.	2nd	
1972–73	4	Reg. Pref.	11th	
1973–74	4	Reg. Pref.	2nd	
1974–75	4	Reg. Pref.	7th	
1975–76	4	Reg. Pref.	16th	
1976–77	4	Reg. Pref.	15th	
1977–78	5	Reg. Pref.	6th	
1978–79	5	Reg. Pref.	17th	
1979–80	5	Reg. Pref.	1st	

Season	Tier	Division	Place	Copa del Rey
1980–81	4	3ª	1st	
1981–82	4	3ª	2nd	Second round
1982–83	4	3ª	8th	First round
1983–84	4	3ª	11th	
1984–85	4	3ª	9th	
1985–86	4	3ª	15th	
1986–87	4	3ª	20th	
1987–88	5	Reg. Pref.	8th	
1988–89	5	Reg. Pref.	13th	
1989–90	5	Reg. Pref.	12th	
1990–91	5	Reg. Pref.	12th	
1991–92	5	Reg. Pref.	14th	
1992–93	6	1ª Reg.	5th	
1993–94	6	1ª Reg.	2nd	
1994–95	5	Reg. Pref.	18th	
1995–96	6	1ª Reg.	2nd	
1996–97	5	Reg. Pref.	17th	
1997–98	5	Reg. Pref.	10th	
1998–99	5	Reg. Pref.	15th	
1999–2000	5	Reg. Pref.	3rd	

Season	Tier	Division	Place	Copa del Rey
2000–01	5	Reg. Pref.	9th	
2001–02	5	Reg. Pref.	3rd	
2002–03	5	Reg. Pref.	4th	
2003–04	5	Reg. Pref.	1st	
2004–05	4	3ª	9th	
2005–06	4	3ª	11th	
2006–07	4	3ª	7th	
2007–08	4	3ª	4th	
2008–09	4	3ª	8th	
2009–10	4	3ª	5th	
2010–11	4	3ª	8th	
2011–12	4	3ª	1st	
2012–13	4	3ª	21st	First round
2013–14	5	Reg. Pref.	10th	
2014–15	5	Reg. Pref.	18th	
2015–16	6	1ª Reg.	10th	
2016–17	6	1ª Reg.	5th	
2017–18	6	1ª Reg.	13th	
2018–19	6	1ª Reg.	4th	
2019–20	6	1ª Reg.	16th	

Season	Tier	Division	Place	Copa del Rey
2020–21	6	1ª Reg.	14th	
2021–22	8	2ª Reg.	6th	
2022–23	DNP			
2023–24	9	3ª FFCV	1st	
2024–25	8	2ª FFCV	3rd	
2025–26	8	2ª FFCV	1st	
2026–27	7	1ª FFCV		

- 28 seasons in Tercera División
