= 2012–13 Celta de Vigo season =

Celta Vigo
2012–13 season
- President: Carlos Mouriño
- Head coach: Paco Herrera
- Stadium: Balaídos
- La Liga: 17th
- Copa del Rey: Round of 16
- Top goalscorer: League: Iago Aspas (12); All: Iago Aspas (12)
Home colours	Away colours

The 2012–13 Celta de Vigo season was the 82nd season in club history. Celta competed in La Liga and the Copa del Rey.

== Competitions ==
=== Legend ===
Win Draw Loss Postponed

=== La Liga ===
==== League table ====
Pos	Team	Pld	W	D	L	GF	GA	GD	Pts	Qualification or relegation
15	Granada	38	11	9	18	37	54	−17	42	
16	Osasuna	38	10	9	19	33	50	−17	39	
17	Celta Vigo	38	10	7	21	37	52	−15	37	
18	Mallorca (R)	38	9	9	20	43	72	−29	36	Relegation to Segunda División
19	Deportivo La Coruña (R)	38	8	11	19	47	70	−23	35	Relegation to Segunda División

Source: La Liga
Rules for classification: 1st points; 2nd head-to-head points; 3rd head-to-head goal difference; 4th goal difference; 5th number of goals scored; 7th Fair-play points
(R) Relegated

==== Results summary ====
Overall								Home						Away					
Pld	W	D	L	GF	GA	GD	Pts	W	D	L	GF	GA	GD	W	D	L	GF	GA	GD
38	10	7	21	37	52	−15	37	7	6	6	23	21	+2	3	1	15	14	31	−17

Last updated: 6 January 2013.
Source: Competitive matches

==== Matches ====
18 August 2012 1	Celta Vigo	0–1	Málaga	Vigo
19:00	Oubiña (yellow card) 80'; Mallo (yellow card) 82'	Report	Olinga 84'	Stadium: Balaídos; Attendance: 16,360; Referee: Carlos del Cerro Grande

25 August 2012 2	Real Sociedad	2–1	Celta Vigo	San Sebastián
19:00	Ansotegi (yellow card) 30'; Illarramendi (yellow card) 38'; Agirretxe 54', 61'; Vela (yellow card) 63'; Griezmann (yellow card) 87'; Bergara (yellow card) 90'	Report	De Lucas 49'; Mallo (yellow card) 64'; López (yellow card) 79'	Stadium: Anoeta; Attendance: 23,000; Referee: Miguel Pérez Montero

1 September 2012 3	Celta Vigo	2–0	Osasuna	Vigo
16:00	Túñez (yellow card) 65'; Aspas 69'; Bermejo 90+3'	Report	Flaño (yellow card) 62'; Arribas (yellow card) 75' (yellow-red card) 83'; Annan (yellow card) 77'	Stadium: Balaídos; Attendance: 15,923; Referee: Alejandro Hernández Hernández

15 September 2012 4	Valencia	2–1	Celta Vigo	Valencia
18:00	Feghouli 4'; Parejo (yellow card) 29'; Cissokho 50'; Barragán (yellow card) 86'; Rami (yellow card) 87'	Report	Cabral 16', (yellow card) 58'; Insa (yellow card) 34'	Stadium: Mestalla; Attendance: 36,000; Referee: José Luis Paradas Romero

22 September 2012 5	Celta Vigo	2–1	Getafe	Vigo
18:00	Lago (yellow card) 13'; Fernández 57'; Park 69', (yellow card) 89'; Krohn-Dehli (yellow card) 90'; Cabral (yellow card) 90+5'	Report	Lopo (yellow card) 33'; Míchel (yellow card) 40'; Alexis (yellow card) 42' (yellow-red card) 90+4'; Barrada 59'	Stadium: Balaídos; Attendance: 17,315; Referee: José Antonio Teixeira Vitienes

30 September 2012 6	Granada	2–1	Celta Vigo	Granada
12:00	Siqueira 11' (pen.); Torje 17', (yellow card) 32'; López (yellow card) 47'; Iriney (yellow card) 60'	Report	Aspas 20'; Fernández (yellow card) 25'; Insa (yellow card) 35'; Túñez (yellow card) 75'	Stadium: Los Cármenes; Attendance: 21,000; Referee: José Antonio Teixeira Vitienes

5 October 2012 7	Celta Vigo	2–0	Sevilla	Vigo
21:30	Krohn-Dehli (yellow card) 36'; Aspas 60' (pen.); López (yellow card) 73'; De Lucas 85'	Summary	Botía (yellow card) 41'; Maduro (yellow card) 59'	Stadium: Balaídos; Attendance: 19,328; Referee: Jesús Gil Manzano

20 October 2012 8	Real Madrid	2–0	Celta Vigo	Madrid
18:00	Higuaín 11'; Alonso (yellow card) 54'; Ronaldo 67' (pen.); Casillas (yellow card) 69'; Ramos (yellow card) 76'	Summary	Cabral (yellow card) 67'; Lago (yellow card) 78'	Stadium: Santiago Bernabéu; Attendance: 70,000; Referee: Carlos Clos Gómez

27 October 2012 9	Celta Vigo	1–1	Deportivo La Coruña	Vigo
20:00	Bermejo 8'; Oubiña (yellow card) 42'; Cabral (yellow card) 48' (yellow-red card) 51'; Krohn-Dehli (yellow card) 90'	Summary	Castro (yellow card) 12'; Domínguez 29', (yellow card) 53'; Marchena (yellow card) 37'; Laure (yellow card) 73'	Stadium: Balaídos; Attendance: 24,875; Referee: Alberto Undiano Mallenco

3 November 2012 10	Barcelona	3 – 1	Celta Vigo	Barcelona
18:00	Adriano 21'; Villa 26'; Alba 61'; Bartra (yellow card) 73'	Summary	Bermejo 24'; Aspas (yellow card) 62'; Oubiña (yellow card) 72'	Stadium: Camp Nou; Attendance: 82,978; Referee: David Fernández Borbalán

10 November 2012 11	Rayo Vallecano	3 – 2	Celta Vigo	Madrid
16:00	Piti (yellow card) 8', (goal) 82' (pen.); Amat (yellow card) 42'; Gálvez (yellow card) 46'; Baptistão 59'; Tito 72'; Delibašić (yellow card) 90'	Summary	Aspas 12', 34'; Fernández (yellow card) 18'; Cabral (yellow card) 23' (yellow-red card) 40'; Bustos (yellow card) 66'; Túñez (yellow card) 82'	Stadium: Campo de Vallecas; Attendance: 8,000; Referee: Alfonso Álvarez Izquierdo

18 November 2012 12	Celta Vigo	1–1	Mallorca	Vigo
16:00	Park 56'; Aspas (yellow card) 71'	Summary	Hemed 22'; Bigas (yellow card) 31'; Geromel (yellow card) 44'; Fontàs (yellow card) 58'	Stadium: Balaídos; Attendance: 17,814; Referee: Pedro Pérez Montero

26 November 2012 13	Zaragoza	0–1	Celta Vigo	Zaragoza
21:00	Săpunaru (yellow card) 32'; Álvaro (yellow card) 87'; Apoño (yellow card) 88'	Summary	Cabral (yellow card) 35'; Aspas 83'	Stadium: La Romareda; Attendance: 31,000; Referee: Carlos Delgado Ferreiro

2 December 2012 14	Celta Vigo	1–1	Levante	Vigo
19:00	De Lucas 37'; Fernández (yellow card) 68'; Bermejo (yellow card) 80'; Cabral (yellow card) 89'	Summary	Ballesteros (yellow card) 48'; Juanlu (yellow card) 53'; Diop (yellow card) 69'; Martí 89'	Stadium: Balaídos; Attendance: 18,000; Referee: Xavier Estrada Fernández

9 December 2012 15	Athletic Bilbao	1–0	Celta Vigo	Bilbao
17:00	Amorebieta (yellow card) 13'; Aduriz 34'; San José (yellow card) 56'; De Marcos (yellow card) 84'	Summary	Insa (yellow card) 17'; Fernández (yellow card) 70'; Oubiña (yellow card) 83'	Stadium: San Mamés; Attendance: 35,000; Referee: Fernando Teixeira Vitienes

17 December 2012 16	Celta Vigo	0–1	Real Betis	Vigo
21:30	Toni (yellow card) 48'; Bermejo (yellow card) 74'	Summary	Juan Carlos (yellow card) 43'; Molina 81'; Amaya (yellow card) 90+1'	Stadium: Balaídos; Attendance: 12,000; Referee: José González González

21 December 2012 17	Atlético Madrid	1–0	Celta Vigo	Madrid
22:00	Turan (yellow card) 33'; Miranda (yellow card) 55' (yellow-red card) 86'; Adrián 77'; Falcao (yellow card) 82'	Summary	Túñez (yellow card) 36'; Varas (yellow card) 62'; Fernández (yellow card) 77'; Vila (yellow card) 83'	Stadium: Vicente Calderón; Attendance: 45,000; Referee: Pedro Pérez Montero

6 January 2013 18	Celta Vigo	3–1	Real Valladolid	Vigo
12:00	Aspas 9', 30' (pen.); Varas (yellow card) 11'; Mallo (yellow card) 44'; López 52'	Summary	Bueno 12' (pen.); Balenziaga (yellow card) 29'; Guerra (yellow card) 40'; Sastre (yellow card) 68'	Stadium: Balaídos; Attendance: 14,913; Referee: Carlos Velasco Carballo

12 January 2013 19	Espanyol	1–0	Celta Vigo	Cornellà de Llobregat
18:00	Forlín (yellow card) 14'; García 24'; J. López (yellow card) 30'; Sánchez (yellow card) 48'; Simão (yellow card) 65'; Baena (yellow card) 67'; Colotto (yellow card) 84'	Report	Á. López (yellow card) 32'	Stadium: Cornellà-El Prat; Attendance: 20,723; Referee: Miguel Pérez Lasa

19 January 2013 20	Málaga	1–1	Celta Vigo	Málaga
22:00	Demichelis 37', (yellow card) 80'; Buonanotte (yellow card) 61'	Report	Varas (yellow card) 38'; Aspas (yellow card) 42'; Fernández 76'; Lago (yellow card) 80'	Stadium: La Rosaleda; Attendance: 20,304; Referee: Xavier Estrada Fernández

26 January 2013 21	Celta Vigo	1–1	Real Sociedad	Vigo
	Krohn-Dehli (yellow card) 18', (goal) 32'; Cabral (yellow card) 30'; Fernández (yellow card) 42' (yellow-red card) 50'; Lago (yellow card) 76'; Park (yellow card) 86'	Report	Elustondo (yellow card) 20', (goal) 59'; De la Bella (yellow card) 65'; Bergara (yellow card) 84'	Stadium: Balaídos; Attendance: 18,136; Referee: José Luis Paradas Romero

2 February 2013 22	Osasuna	1–0	Celta Vigo	Pamplona
	Armenteros 55'; Rubén (yellow card) 59'; Damià (yellow card) 85'	Report	Lago (yellow card) 10'; Bermejo (yellow card) 33'; Toni (yellow card) 83'	Stadium: El Sadar; Attendance: 14,404; Referee: Alejandro Hernández Hernández

9 February 2013 23	Celta Vigo	0–1	Valencia	Vigo
	Aspas (yellow card) 58'; Oubiña (yellow card) 58'	Report	R. Costa (yellow card) 16'; Albelda (yellow card) 30'; Barragán (yellow card) 72'; Feghouli (yellow card) 77'; Valdez 90+3'	Stadium: Balaídos; Attendance: 18,710; Referee: Fernando Teixeira Vitienes

16 February 2013 24	Getafe	3–1	Celta Vigo	Getafe
	Colunga 10'; Borja (yellow card) 14'; Castro 34'; F. Fernández (yellow card) 14'	Report	Cabral (yellow card) 10'; A. Fernández 20'	Stadium: Coliseum Alfonso Pérez; Attendance: 9,000; Referee: Miguel Ayza Gámez

24 February 2013 25	Celta Vigo	2–1	Granada	Vigo
	Aspas 24'; Orellana (yellow card) 26'; Jonny (yellow card) 34'; Demidov (yellow card) 73'; Bermejo 81'	Report	Ighalo 28'; Recio (yellow card) 45'; Nyom (yellow card) 78'; Aranda (yellow card) 88'	Stadium: Balaídos; Attendance: 18,418; Referee: César Muñiz Fernández

4 March 2013 26	Sevilla	4–1	Celta Vigo	Seville
	Negredo 12', 29', 68'; Rakitić (yellow card) 54'; Medel 66'	Report	Fernández 40'; Jonny (yellow card) 53'	Stadium: Ramón Sánchez Pizjuán; Attendance: 27,000; Referee: Carlos del Cerro Grande

10 March 2013 27	Celta Vigo	1–2	Real Madrid	Vigo
	De Lucas (yellow card) 30'; Aspas 63'; Varas (yellow card) 71'	Report	Albiol (yellow card) 42'; Ronaldo 61', 72' (pen.)	Stadium: Balaídos; Attendance: 25,344; Referee: Xavier Estrada Fernández

15 March 2013 28	Deportivo La Coruña	3–1	Celta Vigo	A Coruña
	Riki 9'; Aythami (yellow card) 43'; Sílvio 64'; Salomão 79'; Pizzi (yellow card) 82'	Report	Túñez (yellow card) 6'; Demidov (yellow card) 13'; Lago (yellow card) 28'; Aspas (red card) 29'; Park 80'; Krohn-Dehli (yellow card) 90+1'	Stadium: Riazor; Attendance: 31,000; Referee: Carlos Velasco Carballo

30 March 2013 29	Celta Vigo	2–2	Barcelona	Vigo
	Cabral (yellow card) 32'; Insa 38'; Oubiña (yellow card) 41', (goal) 88'; Lago (yellow card) 62'; Fernández (yellow card) 87'	Report	Fàbregas (yellow card) 25'; Tello 43'; Sánchez (yellow card) 64'; Messi 73'; Busquets (yellow card) 88'	Stadium: Balaídos; Attendance: 29,000; Referee: Antonio Mateu Lahoz

7 April 2013 30	Celta Vigo	0–2	Rayo Vallecano	Vigo
	López (yellow card) 35'; Fernández (yellow card) 43'; Bermejo (yellow card) 64'; Vila (yellow card) 70'; Orellana (yellow card) 85'	Report	Piti 14', (yellow card) 28'; Casado (yellow card) 65'; Tito (yellow card) 67'; Fuego (yellow card) 72'; Rubén (yellow card) 76'; Delibašić 83'	Stadium: Balaídos; Attendance: 19,345; Referee: Pedro Pérez Montero

15 April 2013 31	Mallorca	1–0	Celta Vigo	Palma de Mallorca
	Bigas (yellow card) 64'; Pina (yellow card) 73'; Dos Santos 90+3', (yellow card) 90+3'	Report	Lago (yellow card) 25'	Stadium: Iberostar; Attendance: 13,000; Referee: Jesús Gil Manzano

22 April 2013 32	Celta Vigo	2–1	Real Zaragoza	Vigo
	Jonny (yellow card) 7'; López 37'; Oubiña (yellow card) 67'; Insa (yellow card) 72'; Bermejo 90+2'; Lago (yellow card) 90+5'; Park (yellow card) 90+6'	Report	Săpunaru (yellow card) 2', (goal) 26'; Movilla (yellow card) 56'; Paredes (yellow card) 81'; Pintér (yellow card) 86'	Stadium: Balaídos; Attendance: 17,500; Referee: Carlos del Cerro Grande

27 April 2013 33	Levante	0–1	Celta Vigo	Valencia
	Navarro (yellow card) 27'; López (yellow card) 85'	Report	Fernández 21'; Insa (yellow card) 25'; Aspas (yellow card) 49'; Jonny (yellow card) 55'; Lago (yellow card) 73'; Krohn-Dehli (yellow card) 87'	Stadium: Ciutat de València; Attendance: 11,658; Referee: César Muñiz Fernández

3 May 2013 34	Celta Vigo	1–1	Athletic Bilbao	Vigo
	Vila (yellow card) 60'; Aspas 84'	Report	Gurpegui (yellow card) 35'; De Marcos 43', (yellow card) 90+2'; Iraola (yellow card) 58'; Muniain (yellow card) 69'	Stadium: Balaídos; Attendance: 25,000; Referee: Carlos Velasco Carballo

8 May 2013 35	Celta Vigo	1–3	Atlético Madrid	Vigo
	López (yellow card) 22'; Jonny (yellow card) 26'; Lago (yellow card) 44'; Fernández 84'	Report	Suárez (yellow card) 23'; Godín (yellow card) 33'; Costa 47'; Gabi (yellow card) 57'; Tiago (yellow card) 60'; Juanfran 66'; Falcao 86'	Stadium: Balaídos; Attendance: 23,375; Referee: José Antonio Teixeira Vitienes

12 May 2013 36	Real Betis	1–0	Celta Vigo	Seville
	Amaya (yellow card) 51'; Castro 67', (yellow card) 68'; Vadillo (yellow card) 69'; Pérez (yellow card) 80'	Report	Insa (yellow card) 23'; Jonny (yellow card) 42'; Vila (yellow card) 66'	Stadium: Benito Villamarín; Attendance: 38,547; Referee: Fernando Teixeira Vitienes

26 May 2013 37	Real Valladolid	0–2	Celta Vigo	Valladolid
	Rubio (yellow card) 33'; Larsson (yellow card) 40'; Sastre (yellow card) 50'; Valiente (yellow card) 55'	Report	Cabral 28', (yellow card) 61'; Aspas 56' (pen.); Oubiña (yellow card) 68'	Stadium: José Zorrilla; Attendance: 14,890; Referee: Xavier Estrada Fernández

1 June 2013 38	Celta Vigo	1–0	Espanyol	Vigo
	Insa 16'; Oubiña (yellow card) 65'	Report	García (yellow card) 18'; Forlín (yellow card) 29' (yellow-red card) 90+2'; Mattioni (yellow card) 77'; Colotto (yellow card) 88'	Stadium: Balaídos; Attendance: 30,000; Referee: Antonio Mateu Lahoz

=== Copa del Rey ===
==== Round of 32 ====
31 October 2012 First leg	Almería	2–0	Celta Vigo	Almería
20:00	Zongo 53'; Molinero 87'	Summary	Vila (red card) 62'; Tomàs (yellow card) 79'	Stadium: Mediterráneo; Attendance: 2,487; Referee: Alejandro Hernández Hernández

29 November 2012 Second leg	Celta Vigo	3–0 (a.e.t.) (3–2 agg.)	Almería	Vigo
19:30	Park 55'; Lago 90'; Toni (yellow card) 106'; De Lucas 109'	Summary	Aarón (yellow card) 39' (yellow-red card) 117'; Casquero (yellow card) 70'; Verza (yellow card) 77'; Zongo (yellow card) 88'	Stadium: Balaídos; Attendance: 10,541; Referee: Alberto Undiano Mallenco

==== Round of 16 ====
12 December 2012 First leg	Celta Vigo	2–1	Real Madrid	Vigo
19:30	Krohn-Dehli (yellow card) 29'; Bermejo 56', (yellow card) 65'; Fernández (yellow card) 76'; Bustos 78'; De Lucas (yellow card) 90+4'	Summary	Ronaldo (yellow card) 19', (goal) 87'	Stadium: Balaídos; Attendance: 30,000; Referee: Alfonso Álvarez Izquierdo

9 January 2013 Second leg	Real Madrid	4–0 (5–2 agg.)	Celta Vigo	Madrid
21:30	Ronaldo 3', 24', 87'; Arbeloa (yellow card) 42'; Ramos (yellow card) 42' (yellow-red card) 72'; Khedira 87'	Report	Túñez (yellow card) 38'; Fernández (yellow card) 85'	Stadium: Santiago Bernabéu; Attendance: 60,600; Referee: Miguel Ayza Gámez

== Squad ==
Squad as of 16 September 2012.

Note: Flags indicate national team as defined under FIFA eligibility rules; some limited exceptions apply. Players may hold more than one non-FIFA nationality.

No.	Pos.	Nation	Player
1	GK	ESP	Sergio Álvarez
2	DF	ESP	Hugo Mallo
3	DF	ESP	Roberto Lago
4	MF	ESP	Borja Oubiña (captain)
5	DF	VEN	Andrés Túñez
6	MF	ESP	Jonathan Vila
7	FW	ESP	Dani Abalo
8	MF	ESP	Álex López
9	FW	ESP	Mario Bermejo
10	FW	ESP	Iago Aspas
12	DF	ARG	Gustavo Cabral

No.	Pos.	Nation	Player
13	GK	ESP	Javi Varas (on loan from Sevilla)
14	MF	ESP	Cristian Bustos
16	DF	ESP	Carlos Bellvís
17	MF	ESP	Joan Tomàs
18	FW	KOR	Park Chu-young (on loan from Arsenal)
20	FW	ESP	Toni
21	DF	ESP	Samuel
22	MF	ESP	Enrique de Lucas
23	MF	DEN	Michael Krohn-Dehli
24	MF	ARG	Augusto Fernández
25	MF	ESP	Natxo Insa

=== Squad information ===
N	Pos.	Nat.	Name	Age	EU	Since	App	Goals	Ends	Transfer fee	Notes
1	GK	(Spain)	S. Álvarez	40	EU	2011	19	1		Youth system	
2	RB	(Spain)	Mallo	35	EU	2011	87	1		Youth system	
3	RB	(Spain)	R. Lago	35	EU	2011	120	6		Youth system	
4		(Spain)	B. Oubiña	44	EU	2004	225	1		Youth system	
5	DF	(Venezuela)	A. Túñez	39	EU	2010	69	3		Youth system	
6	MF	(Spain)	J. Villa	40	EU	2007	135	0		Youth system	
8	MF	(Spain)	Á. López	38	EU	2011	30	8			
9	FW	(Spain)	M Bermejo	48	EU	2011	39	8			
10	FW	(Spain)	I. Aspas (YS)	39	EU	2008	102	34			
11	MF	(Croatia)	D. Pranjić	39	EU	2013	2	0			
12	DF	(Argentina)	G. Cabral	41	EU	2012	26	0			
