= 2013–14 Celta de Vigo season =

Celta de Vigo
2013–14 season
- President: Carlos Mouriño
- Head coach: Luis Enrique
- Stadium: Balaídos
- La Liga: 9th
- Copa del Rey: Round of 32
Home colours	Away colours	Third colours

The 2013–14 Celta de Vigo season was the club's 90th season in its history and the 48th in the top-tier.

== Squad ==
As June, 2014..

=== Squad and statistics ===
No.	Pos	Nat	Player	Total		Liga		Copa	
No.	Pos	Nat	Player	Apps	Goals	Apps	Goals	Apps	Goals
1	GK	(Spain) ESP	Sergio Álvarez	4	0	3	0	1	0
2	DF	(Spain) ESP	Hugo Mallo	35	0	33	0	2	0
3	DF	(Spain) ESP	Andreu Fontàs	35	0	35	0	0	0
4	MF	(Spain) ESP	Borja Oubiña	25	1	25	1	0	0
6	MF	(Spain) ESP	Jonathan Vila	3	0	1	0	2	0
8	MF	(Spain) ESP	Álex López	33	5	31	5	2	0
9	FW	(Spain) ESP	Mario Bermejo	14	0	13	0	1	0
10	FW	(Spain) ESP	Nolito	37	14	35	14	2	0
11	FW	(Brazil) BRA	Charles	31	12	30	12	1	0
12	MF	(Brazil) BRA	Rafinha	33	4	32	4	1	0
13	GK	(Spain) ESP	Yoel	35	0	35	0	0	0
14	FW	(Chile) CHI	Fabián Orellana	33	5	31	5	2	0
15	DF	(Spain) ESP	Jon Aurtenetxe	20	0	20	0	0	0
16	DF	(Spain) ESP	Carlos Bellvís	1	0	1	0	0	0
17	MF	(Gabon) GAB	Lévy Madinda	20	0	18	0	2	0
18	FW	(Spain) ESP	David Rodríguez	5	0	5	0	0	0
19	DF	(Spain) ESP	Jonny	28	0	26	0	2	0
20	FW	(Spain) ESP	Toni	13	0	12	0	1	0
21	DF	(Spain) ESP	Íñigo López	9	1	9	1	0	0
22	DF	(Argentina) ARG	Gustavo Cabral	25	1	23	1	2	0
23	MF	(Denmark) DEN	Michael Krohn-Dehli	33	0	31	0	2	0
24	MF	(Argentina) ARG	Augusto Fernández	33	2	33	2	0	0
25	FW	(Brazil) BRA	Welliton	1	0	1	0	0	0
26	GK	(Spain) ESP	Rubén Blanco	1	0	0	0	1	0
29	FW	(Spain) ESP	Santi Mina	31	3	29	2	2	1
30	DF	(Spain) ESP	David Costas	18	0	17	0	1	0
31	DF	(Spain) ESP	David Goldar	1	0	1	0	0	0
33	MF	(Spain) ESP	Javi Rey	1	0	0	0	1	0

== Competitions ==
=== Overall ===
Competition	Started round	Final position / round	First match	Last match
La Liga	—	9th	19 August 2013	17 May 2014
Copa del Rey	Round of 32	Round of 32	7 December 2013	19 December 2013

Updated to match played June 2014
Source: Competitions

=== La Liga ===
Pos	Team	Pld	W	D	L	GF	GA	GD	Pts	Qualification or relegation
7	Real Sociedad	38	16	11	11	62	55	+7	59 (Note: Villarreal finished ahead of Real Sociedad on head-to-head points: Villarreal 5–1 Real Sociedad, Real Sociedad 1–2 Villarreal.)	Qualification for the Europa League third qualifying round (Note: Since both the 2013–14 Copa del Rey champions (Real Madrid) and runners-up (Barcelona) qualified for the 2014–15 UEFA Champions League, the 5th, 6th and 7th placed teams qualified for the group stage, play-off round and third qualifying round of the 2014–15 UEFA Europa League respectively.)
8	Valencia	38	13	10	15	51	53	−2	49	
9	Celta Vigo	38	14	7	17	49	54	−5	49	
10	Levante	38	12	12	14	35	43	−8	48	
11	Málaga	38	12	9	17	39	46	−7	45	

Source: La Liga, ESPN
Rules for classification: 1st points; 2nd head-to-head points;
Notes:

19 August 2013 1	Celta Vigo	2–2	Espanyol	Vigo
	Fernández (yellow card) 32'; Á. López 41', (yellow card) 45+1'; Charles 47'; Rafinha (yellow card) 84'; Rodríguez (yellow card) 87'	Report	Sánchez (yellow card) 13', (goal) 53'; Fuentes (yellow card) 45'; Simão (yellow card) 57'; Bifouma 75'; J. López (yellow card) 88'	Stadium: Balaídos; Attendance: 20,606; Referee: José Teixeira Vitienes

25 August 2013 2	Betis	1–2	Celta Vigo	Seville
	Mabwati (yellow card) 37'; Castro 90'	Report	Krohn-Dehli (yellow card) 39'; Mallo (yellow card) 52'; Oubiña (yellow card) 62' (yellow-red card) 86'; Charles 67'; Nolito 74'; Rafinha (yellow card) 82'	Stadium: Benito Villamarín; Attendance: 29,633; Referee: Eduardo Prieto Iglesias

31 August 2013 3	Celta Vigo	1–1	Granada	Vigo
	Rafinha 29'; Fontàs (yellow card) 77'	Report	Benítez (yellow card) 43'; Piti 62'; Rico (yellow card) 76'	Stadium: Balaídos; Attendance: 21,774; Referee: Juan Martínez Munuera

16 September 2013 4	Athletic Bilbao	3–2	Celta Vigo	Bilbao
	San José 18', (yellow card) 45'; Herrerín (yellow card) 26'; Iraola 61'; Beñat 68'	Report	Nolito (yellow card) 12'; Charles 14'; Mina 79'; Mallo (yellow card) 82'; Rafinha (yellow card) 86'	Stadium: San Mamés; Attendance: 35,686; Referee: Jesús Gil Manzano

22 September 2013 5	Celta Vigo	0–0	Villarreal	Vigo
	Á. López (yellow card) 38'; Aurtenetxe (yellow card) 54'; Costas (yellow card) 75'; Rafinha (yellow card) 84'; Mallo (yellow card) 90+1'	Report	Bruno (yellow card) 48'	Stadium: Balaídos; Attendance: 21,130; Referee: Pedro Pérez Montero

26 September 2013 6	Getafe	2–0	Celta Vigo	Getafe
	López 44'; Arroyo 50', (yellow card) 80'; Mosquera (yellow card) 59'	Report	Aurtenetxe (yellow card) 69'	Stadium: Coliseum Alfonso Pérez; Attendance: 6,000; Referee: José González González

29 September 2013 7	Celta Vigo	0–1	Elche	Vigo
	Oubiña (yellow card) 25'	Report	Coro (yellow card) 49'; Márquez 62'; Fidel (yellow card) 79'; Botía (yellow card) 90+2'	Stadium: Balaídos; Attendance: 19,678; Referee: Eduardo Prieto Iglesias

6 October 2013 8	Atlético Madrid	2–1	Celta Vigo	Madrid
	Costa 43', 62'; Godín (yellow card) 81'	Report	Charles (yellow card) 66'; Nolito 71'; Mallo (yellow card) 72'; Oubiña (yellow card) 81'	Stadium: Vicente Calderón; Attendance: 52,000; Referee: Alberto Undiano Mallenco

21 October 2013 9	Celta Vigo	0–1	Levante	Vigo
	Rafinha (yellow card) 82'; Orellana (yellow card) 88'	Report	Xumetra (yellow card) 84'; Diop 89'	Stadium: Balaídos; Attendance: 14,636; Referee: Alfonso Álvarez Izquierdo

26 October 2013 10	Málaga	0–5	Celta Vigo	Málaga
	Gámez (yellow card) 77'; Pawłowski (yellow card) 87'	Report	Á. López 6', 64'; Fernández 23'; Nolito 73'; Charles 81'	Stadium: La Rosaleda; Attendance: 30,377; Referee: Xavier Estrada Fernández

29 October 2013 11	Celta Vigo	0–3	Barcelona	Vigo
	Rafinha (yellow card) 24'; Fernández (yellow card) 34'; Cabral (yellow card) 38'	Report	Sánchez 9'; Fàbregas (yellow card) 31', (goal) 54'; Yoel 48' (o.g.)	Stadium: Balaídos; Attendance: 26,636; Referee: David Fernández Borbalán

2 November 2013 12	Sevilla	0–1	Celta Vigo	Seville
	Mbia (yellow card) 29'; Figueiras (yellow card) 45'	Report	Á. López 47'; Toni (yellow card) 90+3'	Stadium: Ramón Sánchez Pizjuán; Attendance: 26,636; Referee: Juan Martínez Munuera

9 November 2013 13	Celta Vigo	0–2	Rayo Vallecano	Vigo
	Nolito (yellow card) 30'; Oubiña (yellow card) 53'; Krohn-Dehli (yellow card) 86'	Report	Viera 24'; Gálvez (yellow card) 61'; Falque (yellow card) 66'; Larrivey 72'	Stadium: Balaídos; Attendance: 20,696; Referee: Fernando Teixeira Vitienes

23 November 2013 14	Real Sociedad	4–3	Celta Vigo	San Sebastián
	Vela 6', 61', 78', 81'; Prieto (yellow card) 69'; Bergara (yellow card) 70'	Report	Rafinha 23', 57'; Cabral (yellow card) 24'; Á. López 28'; Fontàs (yellow card) 31' (yellow-red card) 65'; Yoel (yellow card) 69'	Stadium: Anoeta; Attendance: 24,634; Referee: César Muñiz Fernández

30 November 2013 15	Celta Vigo	3–1	Almería	Vigo
	Krohn-Dehli (yellow card) 9'; Orellana 26'; Oubiña 49'; Charles 59'	Report	Suso 9', (yellow card) 79'; Dubarbier (yellow card) 60'	Stadium: Balaídos; Attendance: 18,947; Referee: Miguel Ayza Gámez

16 December 2013 16	Valladolid	3–0	Celta Vigo	Valladolid
	Ramos (yellow card) 23'; Guerra (yellow card) 42', (goal) 60', 67', 86'; Manucho (yellow card) 90+2'	Report	Charles (yellow card) 24' (yellow-red card) 56'; Á. López (yellow card) 57'; Fontàs (yellow card) 80'; Bermejo (yellow card) 90+2'; Mallo (yellow card) 90+2'	Stadium: José Zorrilla; Attendance: 6,850; Referee: José Teixeira Vitienes

22 December 2013 17	Celta Vigo	1–1	Osasuna	Vigo
	Fernández 34'	Report	Armenteros 17'; Damià (yellow card) 58'; Flaño (yellow card) 60'; Cejudo (yellow card) 90+2'	Stadium: Balaídos; Attendance: 14,500; Referee: Carlos Delgado Ferreiro

6 January 2014 18	Real Madrid	3–0	Celta Vigo	Madrid
	Benzema 67'; Ronaldo 82', 90+3'	Report	Á. López (yellow card) 34'; Fernández (yellow card) 43'	Stadium: Santiago Bernabéu; Attendance: 65,217; Referee: Alfonso Álvarez Izquierdo

11 January 2014 19	Celta Vigo	2–1	Valencia	Vigo
	Charles 50', 78'	Report	Parejo 23'; Guardado (yellow card) 44'; Pereira (yellow card) 58'	Stadium: Balaídos; Attendance: 20,000; Referee: José González González

18 January 2014 20	Espanyol	1–0	Celta Vigo	Cornellà de Llobregat
	Sánchez (yellow card) 65'; García 88'	Report	Fernández (yellow card) 45'	Stadium: Cornellà-El Prat; Attendance: 13,710; Referee: Eduardo Prieto Iglesias

24 January 2014 21	Celta Vigo	4–2	Betis	Vigo
	Orellana 22', 39', (yellow card) 87'; Charles 31'; Krohn-Dehli (yellow card) 60'; Nolito 73'	Report	Castro 17', 78', (yellow card) 81'; Sevilla (yellow card) 33'; Nono (yellow card) 64'; Mabwati (red card) 90+1'	Stadium: Balaídos; Attendance: 18,957; Referee: Alejandro Hernández Hernández

31 January 2014 22	Granada	1–2	Celta Vigo	Granada
	Nyom (yellow card) 26'; El-Arabi 41'; Murillo (yellow card) 90'	Report	Cabral (yellow card) 14', (goal) 28'; Oubiña (yellow card) 21'; Mallo (yellow card) 61'; Nolito (yellow card) 65'; Fernández 88'	Stadium: Los Cármenes; Attendance: 16,000; Referee: Antonio Mateu Lahoz

10 February 2014 23	Celta Vigo	0–0	Athletic Bilbao	Vigo
				Stadium: Balaídos

15 February 2014 24	Villarreal	0–2	Celta Vigo	Villarreal
				Stadium: El Madrigal

22 February 2014 25	Celta Vigo	1–1	Getafe	Vigo
				Stadium: Balaídos

1 March 2014 26	Elche	1–0	Celta Vigo	Elche
				Stadium: Manuel Martínez Valero

8 March 2014 27	Celta Vigo	0–2	Atlético Madrid	Vigo
				Stadium: Balaídos

15 March 2014 28	Levante	v	Celta Vigo	Valencia
				Stadium: Ciutat de València

21 March 2014 29	Celta Vigo	0–2	Málaga	Vigo
				Stadium: Balaídos

26 March 2014 30	Barcelona	3–0	Celta Vigo	Barcelona
				Stadium: Camp Nou

29 March 2014 31	Celta Vigo	1–0	Sevilla	Vigo
				Stadium: Balaídos

5 April 2014 32	Rayo Vallecano	3–0	Celta Vigo	Madrid
				Stadium: Campo de Vallecas

12 April 2014 33	Celta Vigo	2–2	Real Sociedad	Vigo
				Stadium: Balaídos

20 April 2014 34	Almería	2–4	Celta Vigo	Almería
				Stadium: Mediterráneo

28 April 2014 35	Celta Vigo	4–1	Valladolid	Vigo
				Stadium: Balaídos

3 May 2014 36	Osasuna	0–2	Celta Vigo	Pamplona
				Stadium: El Sadar

11 May 2014 37	Celta Vigo	2–0	Real Madrid	Vigo
				Stadium: Balaídos

17 May 2014 38	Valencia	2–1	Celta Vigo	Valencia
				Stadium: Mestalla

=== Copa del Rey ===
==== Round of 32 ====
First leg	v

Second leg	v
