= 2015–16 Celta de Vigo season =

Celta de Vigo
2015–16 season
- President: Carlos Mouriño
- Head coach: Eduardo Berizzo
- Stadium: Balaídos
- La Liga: 6th
- Copa del Rey: Semi-final
- Top goalscorer: League: Iago Aspas (14); All: Iago Aspas (18)
Home colours	Away colours	Third colours

The 2015–16 season was the 92nd season in Celta de Vigo’s history and the 50th in the top-tier.

== Current squad ==
As of 31 August 2015

Note: Flags indicate national team as defined under FIFA eligibility rules; some limited exceptions apply. Players may hold more than one non-FIFA nationality.

No.	Pos.	Nation	Player
1	GK	ESP	Sergio Álvarez
2	DF	ESP	Hugo Mallo
3	DF	ESP	Andreu Fontàs
6	MF	SRB	Nemanja Radoja
7	FW	BEL	Theo Bongonda
8	MF	CHI	Pablo Hernández
9	FW	ESP	Iago Aspas
10	MF	ESP	Nolito
11	FW	SWE	John Guidetti
13	GK	ESP	Rubén Blanco

No.	Pos.	Nation	Player
14	MF	CHI	Fabián Orellana
16	MF	SRB	Dejan Dražić
17	MF	GAB	Lévy Madinda
18	MF	DEN	Daniel Wass
19	DF	ESP	Jonny
20	DF	ESP	Sergi Gómez
21	DF	ESP	Carles Planas
22	DF	ARG	Gustavo Cabral
23	MF	ESP	Josep Señé

=== Out on loan ===
Note: Flags indicate national team as defined under FIFA eligibility rules; some limited exceptions apply. Players may hold more than one non-FIFA nationality.

No.	Pos.	Nation	Player
—	DF	ESP	David Costas (on loan at Mallorca)
—	MF	ESP	Álex López (on loan at Sheffield Wednesday)
—	MF	ESP	Yelko Pino (on loan at Swindon Town)

== Competitions ==
=== Overall ===
Competition	Started round	Final position / round	First match	Last match
La Liga	Matchday 1	6th	23 August 2015	14 May 2016
Copa del Rey	Round of 32	Semi-finals	2 December 2015	11 February 2016

Updated to match played 14 May 2016
Source: Competitions

=== Overview ===
Competition	Record							
Competition	Pld	W	D	L	GF	GA	GD	Win %
La Liga	38	17	9	12	52	59	−7	44.74
Copa del Rey	6	4	1	1	11	7	+4	66.67
Total	44	21	10	13	63	66	−3	47.73

Last updated: 14 May 2016
Source: Competitions

=== La Liga ===
==== League table ====
Pos	Team	Pld	W	D	L	GF	GA	GD	Pts	Qualification or relegation
4	Villarreal	38	18	10	10	44	35	+9	64	Qualification for the Champions League play-off round
5	Athletic Bilbao	38	18	8	12	58	45	+13	62	Qualification for the Europa League group stage (Note: Since the winners of the 2015–16 Copa del Rey, Barcelona, qualified for European competition based on league position, the spot awarded to the cup winners (Europa League group stage) was passed to the sixth-placed team and the spot awarded to the sixth-placed team (Europa League third qualifying round) was passed to the seventh-placed team.)
6	Celta Vigo	38	17	9	12	51	59	−8	60	Qualification for the Europa League group stage
7	Sevilla	38	14	10	14	51	50	+1	52	Qualification for the Champions League group stage (Note: Sevilla qualified for the Champions League group stage by winning the 2015–16 UEFA Europa League. Based on their league position (7th), they would have received the spot above to enter the Europa League third qualifying round. This spot was vacated without replacement as per UEFA regulations.)
8	Málaga	38	12	12	14	38	35	+3	48 (Note: Málaga finished ahead of Real Sociedad on head-to-head record; Málaga 3–1 Real Sociedad, Real Sociedad 1–1 Málaga.)	

Source: La Liga, Soccerway
Rules for classification: 1) Points; 2) Head-to-head points; 3) Head-to-head goal difference; 4) Goal difference; 5) Goals scored; 6) Fair-play points; 7) Play-off.

==== Results summary ====
Overall								Home						Away					
Pld	W	D	L	GF	GA	GD	Pts	W	D	L	GF	GA	GD	W	D	L	GF	GA	GD
38	17	9	12	51	58	−7	60	9	6	4	29	25	+4	8	3	8	22	33	−11

Last updated: 14 May 2016.
Source: LaLiga.es

==== Result round by round ====
Round	1	2	3	4	5	6	7	8	9	10	11	12	13	14	15	16	17	18	19	20	21	22	23	24	25	26	27	28	29	30	31	32	33	34	35	36	37	38
Ground	A	H	H	A	H	A	H	A	H	A	H	A	H	A	H	A	H	A	H	H	A	A	H	A	H	A	H	A	H	A	H	A	H	A	H	A	H	A
Result	W	W	D	W	W	D	D	W	L	W	L	L	W	D	W	W	L	L	L	W	L	L	D	L	W	W	D	L	W	W	D	W	D	D	W	L	W	L
Position	2	1	3	4	2	4	4	2	4	3	4	5	4	4	4	4	5	5	5	5	7	7	7	8	6	6	6	7	7	5	5	5	6	6	5	6	5	6

Updated to match(es) played on 14 May 2016. Source:
A = Away; H = Home; W = Win; D = Draw; L = Loss

==== Matches ====
Win Draw Loss

23 August 2015 1	Levante	1–2	Celta de Vigo	Valencia
22:00 (UTC+2)	Simão Mate (red card) 5'; Verza 55'	Report	Orellana 41'; Aspas 77'	Stadium: Ciutat de València; Attendance: 10,346; Referee: Ricardo de Burgos Bengoetxea

29 August 2015 2	Celta Vigo	3–0	Rayo Vallecano	Vigo
22:00 (UTC+2)	Nolito 11' (pen.), 50'; Fontàs 88'	Report	Toño (red card) 9'	Stadium: Balaídos; Attendance: 16,344; Referee: Juan Martínez Munuera

13 September 2015 3	Celta Vigo	3–3	Las Palmas	Vigo
18:15 (UTC+2)	Orellana 13' (pen.); Wass 18'; Nolito 48'	Report	Varas (red card) 11'; Araujo 23'; Hernández 61' (o.g.); David Simón 74'	Stadium: Balaídos; Attendance: 19,044; Referee: Xavier Estrada Fernández

20 September 2015 4	Sevilla	1–2	Celta Vigo	Seville
12:00 CEST (UTC+02:00)	Llorente 54'	Report	Nolito 15'; Wass 26'; Jonny (yellow card) 45+2' (yellow-red card) 90+1'	Stadium: Ramón Sánchez Pizjuán; Attendance: 35,771; Referee: Santiago Jaime Latre

23 September 2015 5	Celta Vigo	4–1	Barcelona	Vigo
20:00 CEST	Nolito 26'; Aspas 30', 56'; Mallo (yellow card) 79'; Guidetti 83'; Gómez (yellow card) 90'	Report	Busquets (yellow card) 23'; Neymar 80', (yellow card) 89'	Stadium: Balaídos; Attendance: 23,311; Referee: Alberto Undiano Mallenco

26 September 2015 6	Eibar	1–1	Celta Vigo	Eibar
22:05 CEST	Borja 3'; Capa (yellow card) 23'; Enrich (yellow card) 41'; García (yellow card) 56'; Adrián (yellow card) 66'; Mauro (yellow card) 80'	Report	Hernández (yellow card) 27'; Radoja (yellow card) 43'; Orellana (yellow card) 54'; Fernández (yellow card) 71'; Aspas 76'	Stadium: Ipurua; Attendance: 4,862; Referee: Pedro Pérez Montero

2 October 2015 7	Celta Vigo	0–0	Getafe	Vigo
20:30 CEST	Nolito (yellow card) 44'	Report	Vergini (yellow card) 43'; Vigaray (yellow card) 52'; Emi (yellow card) 89'; J. Rodríguez (yellow card) 90'; Šćepović (yellow card) 90+4'	Stadium: Balaídos; Attendance: 18,154; Referee: Eduardo Prieto Iglesias

18 October 2015 8	Villarreal	1–2	Celta Vigo	Villarreal
12:00 CEST	Bailly (yellow card) 36' (yellow-red card) 47'; Suárez 67'; Soldado (yellow card) 51'	Report	Fernández (yellow card) 36'; Gómez (yellow card) 37'; Orellana 41'; Wass (yellow card) 43'; Nolito 90'	Stadium: El Madrigal; Attendance: 17,436; Referee: José González González

24 October 2015 9	Celta Vigo	1–3	Real Madrid	Vigo
16:00 CET (UTC+02:00)	Cabral (yellow card) 37' (yellow-red card) 57'; Fernández (yellow card) 57'; Hernández (yellow card) 57'; Aspas (yellow card) 57'; Nolito (yellow card) 61', (goal) 85'	Report	Ronaldo 8'; Danilo 23'; Vázquez (yellow card) 52'; Marcelo 90+5'	Stadium: Balaídos; Attendance: 25,494; Referee: Carlos Clos Gómez

31 October 2015 10	Real Sociedad	2–3	Celta Vigo	San Sebastián
22:05 CET (UTC+01:00)	Agirretxe 11', 37'; Zaldúa (yellow card) 71'; Illarramendi (yellow card) 86'	Report	Aspas 17', 56', (yellow card) 72'; Radoja (yellow card) 45'; Hernández (yellow card) 68', (goal) 89'; Mallo (yellow card) 87'; Jonny (yellow card) 88'	Stadium: Anoeta; Attendance: 19,270; Referee: David Fernández Borbalán

7 November 2015 11	Celta Vigo	1–5	Valencia	Vigo
16:00 CET (UTC+01:00)	Fernández 24', (yellow card) 73'	Report	Alcácer 13', 46'; Fuego (yellow card) 27'; Gayà (yellow card) 37'; Parejo 45', 64'; Mustafi (yellow card) 50', (goal) 79'	Stadium: Balaídos; Attendance: 22,131; Referee: Iñaki Vicandi Garrido

21 November 2015 12	Deportivo La Coruña	2–0	Celta Vigo	A Coruña
22:05 CET (UTC+01:00)	Lucas (yellow card) 23', (goal) 23'; Lux (yellow card) 25'; Mosquera (yellow card) 53'; Rodríguez (yellow card) 53'; Luisinho (yellow card) 70'; Juanfran (yellow card) 78'	Report	Hernández (yellow card) 40'; Jonny (yellow card) 78'; Nolito (yellow card) 84'	Stadium: Estadio Riazor; Attendance: 29,666; Referee: Alfonso Álvarez Izquierdo

28 November 2015 13	Celta Vigo	2–1	Sporting Gijón	Vigo
22:05 CET (UTC+01:00)	Orellana 15'; Gómez (yellow card) 23'; Cabral (yellow card) 54'; Nolito 84'; Hernández (yellow card) 90+1'	Report	Castro 65'	Stadium: Balaídos; Attendance: 18,039; Referee: Santiago Jaime Latre

5 December 2015 14	Real Betis	1–1	Celta Vigo	Seville
22:05 CET (UTC+01:00)	Bruno (yellow card) 16'; N'Diaye (yellow card) 34'; Petros (yellow card) 38'; Molina (yellow card) 68', (goal) 82'; Ceballos (yellow card) 87'	Report	Bongonda (yellow card) 22', (goal) 25'; Planas (yellow card) 29'; Mallo (yellow card) 35'; Jonny (red card) 48'; Nolito (yellow card) 77'; Sergio (yellow card) 89'	Stadium: Benito Villamarín; Attendance: 33,762; Referee: Alejandro Hernández Hernández

12 December 2015 15	Celta Vigo	1–0	Espanyol	Vigo
18:15 CET (UTC+01:00)	Fernández (yellow card) 35'; Hernández (yellow card) 40' (yellow-red card); Aspas 42'; Orellana (yellow card) 76'; Nolito (yellow card) 87'	Report	Pérez (yellow card) 15'; Sánchez (yellow card) 26'	Stadium: Balaídos; Attendance: 16,498; Referee: David Fernández Borbalán

20 December 2015 16	Granada	0–2	Celta Vigo	Granada
18:15 CET (UTC+01:00)	Rochina (yellow card) 44'; Success (yellow card) 54'; Pérez (yellow card) 56'; Uche (yellow card) 90+1'	Summary	Aspas (yellow card) 18', (goal) 45'; Orellana 21'; Planas (yellow card) 54'	Stadium: Los Cármenes; Attendance: 14,537; Referee: Juan Martínez Munuera

30 December 2015 17	Celta Vigo	0–1	Athletic Bilbao	Vigo
20:30 CET (UTC+01:00)	Cabral (yellow card) 65'; Bongonda (yellow card) 84'; Radoja (yellow card) 87'	Report	San José (yellow card) 24'; Laporte (yellow card) 52'; Beñat (yellow card) 69'; García 71'; Iraizoz (yellow card) 80'	Stadium: Balaídos; Attendance: 19,157; Referee: Pedro Pérez Montero

2 January 2016 18	Málaga	2–0	Celta Vigo	Málaga
22:05 CET (UTC+01:00)	Charles 8', (yellow card) 88'; Albentosa 26'; Amrabat (yellow card) 30'; Recio (yellow card) 67'; Camacho (yellow card) 83'	Report	Cabral (yellow card) 25'; Hernández (yellow card) 38'; Blanco (red card) 64'	Stadium: La Rosaleda; Attendance: 17,635; Referee: Iñaki Vicandi Garrido

10 January 2016 19	Celta Vigo	0–2	Atlético Madrid	Vigo
20:30 CET (UTC+01:00)	Hernández (yellow card) 63'; Radoja (yellow card) 67'	Report	Filipe Luís (yellow card) 36'; Griezmann 47'; Carrasco 80'	Stadium: Balaídos; Attendance: 13,550; Referee: Ricardo de Burgos Bengoetxea

16 January 2016 20	Celta Vigo	4–3	Levante	Vigo
18:15 CET (UTC+01:00)	Bongonda (yellow card) 32'; Guidetti 35', 40'; Aspas 57'; Orellana 84'	Report	Toño (yellow card) 31'; Simão Mate (yellow card) 40'; Deyverson 63'; López 65'; Camarasa (yellow card) 67'; Jefferson (yellow card) 68'; Morales 89'	Stadium: Balaídos; Attendance: 17,080; Referee: Carlos del Cerro Grande

23 January 2016 21	Rayo Vallecano	3–0	Celta Vigo	Madrid
22:05 CET (UTC+01:00)	Miku 21'; Tito 26'; Jozabed 36'; Dorado (yellow card) 80'; Quini (yellow card) 88'; Trashorras (yellow card) 90+2'	Report	Beauvue (yellow card) 19'; Goldar (yellow card) 35'; Orellana (yellow card) 39'; Dražić (yellow card) 45+1'	Stadium: Campo de Vallecas; Attendance: 10,780; Referee: Santiago Jaime Latre

30 January 2016 22	Las Palmas	2–1	Celta Vigo	Las Palmas
20:30 CET (UTC+01:00)	David Simón (yellow card) 16'; Viera 33' (pen.); Aythami (yellow card) 42'; Willian José (yellow card) 45+1', (goal) 90'; Wakaso (yellow card) 56'; Mesa (yellow card) 66'; Momo (yellow card) 81'	Report	Bongonda 5', (yellow card) 90+2'; Mallo (yellow card) 29'; Orellana (yellow card) 32' (yellow-red card) 74'	Stadium: Gran Canaria; Attendance: 18,473; Referee: José María Sánchez Martínez

7 February 2016 23	Celta Vigo	1–1	Sevilla	Vigo
18:15 CET (UTC+01:00)	Gómez (yellow card) 8'; Bongonda (yellow card) 30'; Aspas (yellow card) 41'; Beauvue 64'	Report	Fazio (yellow card) 3' (yellow-red card) 25'; Konoplyanka (yellow card) 34'; Carriço 43'; Escudero (yellow card) 72'; Rico (yellow card) 74'	Stadium: Balaídos; Attendance: 16,420; Referee: Carlos Velasco Carballo

14 February 2016 24	Barcelona	6–1	Celta Vigo	Barcelona
	Messi 28'; Suárez 59', 75'; Rakitić 84'; Neymar 90+2'	Report	Cabral (yellow card) 11'; Planas (yellow card) 26'; Guidetti 39' (pen.); Mallo (yellow card) 42'; Señé (yellow card) 74'	Stadium: Camp Nou; Attendance: 72,850; Referee: Alejandro Hernández Hernández

21 February 2016 25	Celta Vigo	3–2	Eibar	Vigo
22:05 CET (UTC+01:00)	Hernández (yellow card) 26'; Guidetti 31'; Otto 39'	Report	Lillo (yellow card) 20'; Capa (yellow card) 51'; Saúl 84' (pen.); Inui 87'	Stadium: Balaídos; Attendance: 14,724; Referee: Mario Melero López

28 February 2016 26	Getafe	0–1	Celta Vigo	Getafe
18:15 CET (UTC+01:00)	Velázquez (yellow card) 18'; Yoda (yellow card) 42'; Buendía (yellow card) 52'	Report	Guidetti (yellow card) 42'; Hernández (yellow card) 58'; Nolito 71'; Aspas (yellow card) 78'; Mallo (yellow card) 81'	Stadium: Coliseum Alfonso Pérez; Attendance: 5,652; Referee: David Fernández Borbalán

2 March 2016 27	Celta Vigo	0–0	Villarreal	Vigo
20:00 CET (UTC+01:00)	Díaz (yellow card) 51'; Cabral (yellow card) 73'	Report	Matías Nahuel (yellow card) 54'; Suárez (yellow card) 72'; Bailly (yellow card) 73'; Mario (yellow card) 77'; Rukavina (yellow card) 86'	Stadium: Balaídos; Attendance: 15,376; Referee: Santiago Jaime Latre

5 March 2016 28	Real Madrid	7–1	Celta Vigo	Madrid
16:00 CET (UTC+01:00)	Pepe 41'; Ronaldo 50', 58', 64', 76'; Jesé 77'; Bale 81'	Report	Aspas 62'	Stadium: Santiago Bernabéu; Attendance: 68,467; Referee: Jesús Gil Manzano

13 March 2016 29	Celta Vigo	1–0	Real Sociedad	Vigo
18:15 CET (UTC+01:00)	Aspas 16'; Cabral (yellow card) 46'; Radoja (yellow card) 83'; Díaz (yellow card) 88'	Report	Berchiche (yellow card) 28'; Elustondo (yellow card) 90+1'	Stadium: Balaídos; Attendance: 17,767; Referee: Juan Martínez Munuera

20 March 2016 30	Valencia	0–2	Celta Vigo	Valencia
18:00 CET (UTC+01:00)	Alcácer (yellow card) 74'	Report	Guidetti 80'; Mallo 84'	Stadium: Mestalla; Attendance: 32,909; Referee: Alberto Undiano Mallenco

3 April 2016 31	Celta Vigo	1–1	Deportivo La Coruña	Vigo
18:00 CET (UTC+01:00)	Jonny (yellow card) 15'; Wass (yellow card) 18'; Nolito 30'; Cabral (yellow card) 78'; Mallo (yellow card) 90+4'	Report	Borges 21'; Arribas (yellow card) 61' (yellow-red card) 68'; Luisinho (yellow card) 87'; Fernández (yellow card) 90+2'	Stadium: Balaídos; Attendance: 21,253; Referee: David Fernández Borbalán

10 April 2016 32	Sporting Gijón	0–1	Celta Vigo	Gijón
12:00 CET (UTC+01:00)	Vranješ (yellow card) 35'; Cases (yellow card) 71'	Report	Jonny (yellow card) 19'; Orellana (yellow card) 35'; Nolito 64'; Wass (yellow card) 67'; Guidetti (yellow card) 79'; Blanco (yellow card) 85'	Stadium: El Molinón; Attendance: 24,163; Referee: Antonio Mateu Lahoz

17 April 2016 33	Celta Vigo	1–1	Real Betis	Vigo
22:05 CET (UTC+01:00)	Cabral (yellow card) 59'; Jonny (yellow card) 72'; Hernández (yellow card) 78', (goal) 78'; Orellana (yellow card) 89'	Report	N'Diaye 24'; Castro (yellow card) 32'; Ceballos (yellow card) 56'; Cejudo (yellow card) 82'	Stadium: Balaídos; Referee: Ricardo de Burgos Bengoetxea

20 April 2016 34	Espanyol	1–1	Celta Vigo	Barcelona
20:00 CET (UTC+01:00)	Sánchez (yellow card) 10'; Asensio 39'	Report	Aspas 28'; Hernández (yellow card) 89'	Stadium: Cornellà-El Prat; Attendance: 14,227; Referee: Eduardo Prieto Iglesias

24 April 2016 35	Celta Vigo	2–1	Granada	Vigo
20:30 CET (UTC+01:00)	Aspas 16' (pen.), 76', (yellow card) 77'; Planas (yellow card) 70'	Report	Lopes (yellow card) 29'; El-Arabi 69'; Robert (yellow card) 79'	Stadium: Balaídos; Attendance: 18,241; Referee: Jesús Gil Manzano

1 May 2016 36	Athletic Bilbao	2–1	Celta Vigo	Bilbao
12:00 CEST (UTC+02:00)	Aduriz 38' (pen.); García (yellow card) 45+1' (goal) 72'	Report	Orellana 13', (yellow card) 42'; Díaz (yellow card) 28'; Cabral (yellow card) 37' (yellow-red card) 40'; Nolito (yellow card) 82'; Hernández (yellow card) 90'	Stadium: San Mamés; Attendance: 42,654; Referee: Xavier Estrada Fernández

8 May 2016 37	Celta Vigo	1–0	Málaga	Vigo
17:00 CEST (UTC+02:00)	Nolito 31'	Report	Ricca (yellow card) 27'; Recio (yellow card) 45'	Stadium: Balaídos; Attendance: 20,040; Referee: Carlos del Cerro Grande

14 May 2016 38	Atlético Madrid	2–1	Celta Vigo	Madrid
19:30 CEST (UTC+02:00)	Gabi (yellow card) 36'; Griezmann (yellow card) 47', (goal) 54'; Torres 51'; Savić (yellow card) 79'; Koke (yellow card) 81'	Report	Orellana (yellow card) 67'; Nolito (yellow card) 81'; Mallo (yellow card) 82'; Hernández (yellow card) 83'; Aspas (yellow card) 84'	Stadium: Vicente Calderón; Attendance: 42,139; Referee: David Fernández Borbalán

== See also ==
2015–16 La Liga
