= Javi Rey =

Javi Rey may refer to:

- Javier Rey (born 1980), Spanish actor
- Javi Rey (footballer, born 1985), Spanish retired footballer and current manager
- Javi Rey (footballer, born 1991), Spanish football midfielder
