= Hugo Mallo =

Spanish footballer

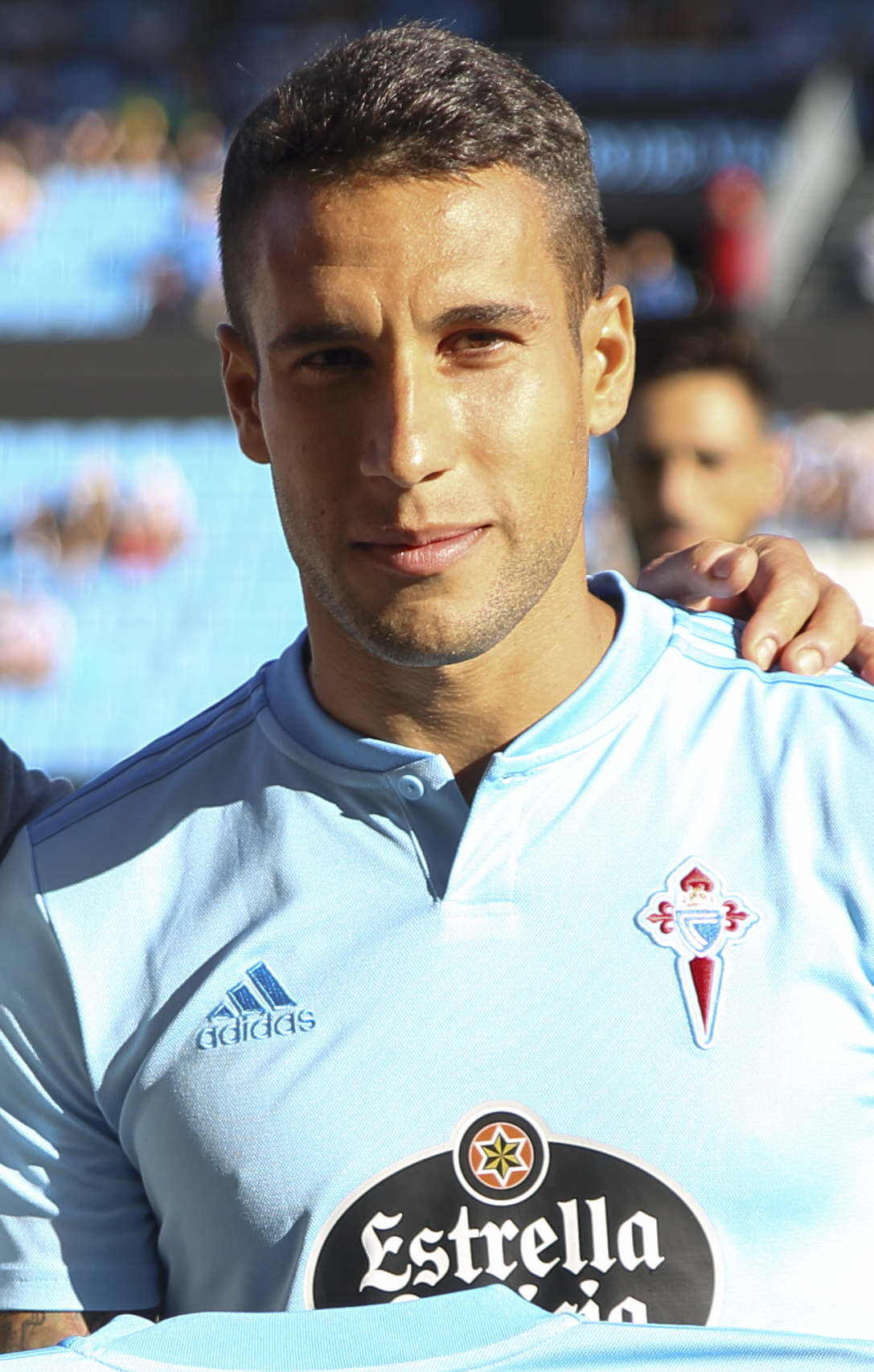
- Mallo with Celta in 2018

Personal information
- Full name: Hugo Mallo Novegil
- Date of birth: 22 June 1991 (age 35)
- Place of birth: Marín, Spain
- Height: 1.73 m (5 ft 8 in)
- Position: Right-back

Youth career
- Porvir
- Pontevedra
- 1999–2009: Celta

Senior career*
Years	Team	Apps	(Gls)
2009–2023	Celta	396	(10)
2023–2024	Internacional	14	(1)
2024–2025	Aris	20	(1)

International career
2010	Spain U19	3	(0)
2011	Spain U20	6	(0)
2011–2012	Spain U21	3	(0)
2016	Galicia	1	(0)
- * Club domestic league appearances and goals as of 23:05, 31 May 2025 (UTC)

Hugo Mallo Novegil (born 22 June 1991) is a Spanish professional footballer who plays as a right-back.

He spent most of his professional career with Celta, making 449 competitive appearances including a club record of 309 in La Liga.

== Club career ==
=== Celta ===
Born in Marín, Pontevedra, Galicia, Mallo played youth football for three local clubs, finishing his development with RC Celta de Vigo. He was immediately inserted in the first-team setup, appearing in 25 Segunda División games in his first season, starting with a 2–1 home loss against CD Numancia on 29 August 2009 in which he came on as a half-time substitute for Roberto Lago. The following 3 April, again from the bench, he was sent off for conceding a penalty kick with a foul on Juan Domínguez which resulted in the only goal of Real Unión's visit to Balaídos.

On 16 October 2010, Mallo scored his first career goal in a 2–2 draw at Villarreal CF B. He started in all 34 matches he appeared in the 2011–12 campaign, as the side finished second and returned to La Liga after five years; he made his debut in the competition on 18 August 2012, in a 0–1 home defeat to Málaga CF.

On 9 January 2013, during a 4–0 Copa del Rey loss at Real Madrid (5–2 aggregate), Mallo – who was not being challenged – suffered an anterior cruciate ligament to his left knee, going on to be sidelined for the rest of the season. He scored his first top-flight goal on 23 May 2015, opening the team's account in a 3–2 home win over RCD Espanyol.

Mallo scored in the Galician derby on 23 October 2016, setting Celta up for a 4–1 victory against local rivals Deportivo de La Coruña. He played 12 games in a run to the semi-finals of the UEFA Europa League, his debut continental campaign; in the second leg of the last 16, he scored in a 2–0 away defeat of Russia's FC Krasnodar (4–1 aggregate).

On 5 May 2018, Mallo made his 300th competitive appearance in another local derby, putting him sixth in their all-time veterans. That August, he turned down a move to Premier League newcomers Fulham, instead signing a new five-year contract with a buyout clause of €50 million. On 24 November 2019 he moved joint-fourth on the list with a 350th appearance at Villarreal CF, and at 28 he became the youngest player to reach that figure for the club.

By the time that he turned 30 in June 2021, Mallo had beaten Aleksandr Mostovoi's record of 235 top-tier games for Celta. On 15 August that year, his added-time foul on Luis Suárez in a 2–1 home loss to Atlético Madrid caused a brawl which resulted in dismissals for himself, opponent Mario Hermoso and Atléti fitness coach Óscar Ortega. He returned from suspension 13 days later in a 1–0 defeat at the same venue to Athletic Bilbao, his 400th match.

Mallo left on 8 June 2023, after his contract expired; at the time of his departure, he was the club player with the most appearances in the main division at 309.

=== Internacional ===
On 14 August 2023, the 32-year-old Mallo moved abroad for the first time in his career, signing a contract with Campeonato Brasileiro Série A side SC Internacional until December 2024. Signed by former Celta manager Eduardo Coudet, he made his debut five days later as a 62nd-minute substitute for Vitão in a 1–0 home loss to Fortaleza Esporte Clube, becoming the Porto Alegre club's first European in over a century and first Spaniard.

Mallo's first goal came on 27 September 2023 in the first leg of the semi-finals of the Copa Libertadores away to compatriots Fluminense FC at the Maracanã Stadium, a 2–2 draw with the eventual champions. He played both legs of the tie at the expense of Fabricio Bustos, but then suffered a left-thigh muscle injury that ended his campaign.

=== Later career ===
On 1 August 2024, Mallo joined Aris Thessaloniki F.C. of Super League Greece on a two-year deal.

== International career ==
Mallo earned three caps for Spain at under-19 level in 2010. In their run to second place at the 2010 UEFA European Championship, he played in the suspended Martín Montoya's absence in the final group game, a 3–0 win against Italy in Flers, Orne.

Julen Lopetegui named Mallo in the under-20 squad for the 2011 FIFA World Cup in Colombia. He played all five games of a quarter-final campaign.

In September 2011, Mallo made his first under-21 appearances in home and away wins over Georgia in European qualification. He then lost his place to Montoya, missed the 2012 Olympics and was edged from even his substitute place under Luis Milla for a year until being recalled against Italy in November 2012, his final international.

Mallo played for the unofficial Galicia team on 20 May 2016, in a 1–1 draw with Venezuela at Riazor.

== Sexual abuse case ==
On 30 January 2024, Mallo was ordered to stand trial in Barcelona's Criminal Court number 19 for allegations that he inappropriately touched the breasts of a woman who wore a parakeet costume while working as an Espanyol mascot. The incident, which was caught on film, took place in a Celta match at the Cornellà-El Prat Stadium on 24 April 2019; due to the penal code which was in force at the time, he could be charged with sexual abuse rather than sexual assault, with the trial being scheduled to start on 11 July 2024.

The accuser, who remained anonymous and used the alias "Ms. Ana," previously testified about the incident while appearing before the Court of First Instance and Instruction Number 2 of Cornellà de Llobregat on 27 June 2019. On 25 September, the court would give the case a provisional dismissal. However, on 14 November, it would deny Mallo a "free dismissal" which would have closed the case. On 31 May 2021, the Ninth Section of the Provincial Court of Barcelona revoked the court's dismissal; he maintained his innocence, claiming that he did not know the gender of the person in the parakeet costume at the time of the incident and that he greeted Espanyol's mascots and players normally.

== Career statistics ==
As of match played 19 October 2023

Appearances and goals by club, season and competition
Club	Season	League			National Cup		International		Other		Total	
Club	Season	Division	Apps	Goals	Apps	Goals	Apps	Goals	Apps	Goals	Apps	Goals
Celta	2009–10	Segunda División	25	0	5	0	—		—		30	0
Celta	2010–11	Segunda División	28	1	0	0	—		2 (Note: Appearances in La Liga play-offs)	0	30	1
Celta	2011–12	Segunda División	34	0	3	0	—		—		37	0
Celta	2012–13	La Liga	17	0	4	0	—		—		21	0
Celta	2013–14	La Liga	33	0	2	0	—		—		35	0
Celta	2014–15	La Liga	28	1	1	0	—		—		29	1
Celta	2015–16	La Liga	34	1	7	0	—		—		41	1
Celta	2016–17	La Liga	23	2	6	0	12 (Note: Appearances in UEFA Europa League)	1	—		41	3
Celta	2017–18	La Liga	34	0	4	0	—		—		38	0
Celta	2018–19	La Liga	35	1	0	0	—		—		35	1
Celta	2019–20	La Liga	27	0	2	0	—		—		29	0
Celta	2020–21	La Liga	31	3	1	1	—		—		32	4
Celta	2021–22	La Liga	21	1	2	0	—		—		23	1
Celta	2022–23	La Liga	26	0	2	0	—		—		28	0
Celta total			396	10	39	1	12	1	2	0	449	12
Internacional	2023	Série A	6	0	0	0	3 (Note: Appearances in Copa Libertadores)	1	0	0	9	1
Career total			402	10	39	1	15	2	2	0	458	13

== Honours ==
Spain U19

- UEFA European Under-19 Championship runner-up: 2010
