= Gustavo Cabral =

Argentine footballer

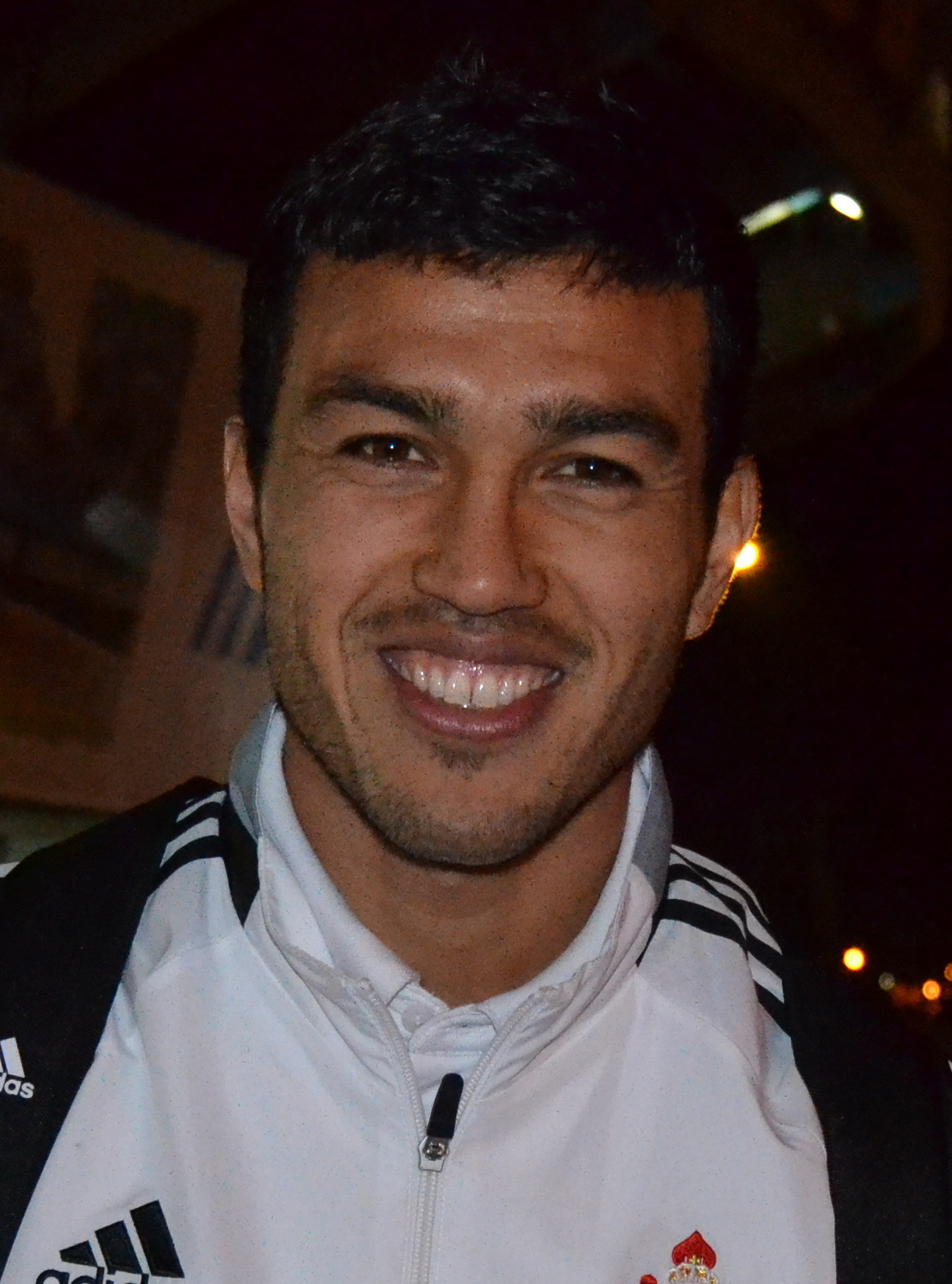
- Cabral in 2015

Personal information
- Full name: Gustavo Daniel Cabral
- Date of birth: 14 October 1985 (age 41)
- Place of birth: Isidro Casanova, Argentina
- Height: 1.82 m (6 ft 0 in)
- Position: Centre-back

Team information
- Current team: Almirante Brown

Senior career*
| Years | Team | Apps | (Gls) |
| 2003–2007 | Racing Club | 112 | (3) |
| 2008–2010 | River Plate | 55 | (3) |
| 2010–2011 | Tecos | 30 | (1) |
| 2011–2013 | Arsenal Sarandí | 0 | (0) |
| 2011–2012 | → Levante (loan) | 16 | (1) |
| 2012–2013 | → Celta (loan) | 27 | (2) |
| 2013–2019 | Celta | 164 | (5) |
| 2019–2025 | Pachuca | 169 | (10) |
| 2026– | Almirante Brown | 8 | (0) |

International career
| 2005 | Argentina U20 | 6 | (0) |
Medal record
Men's football
Representing Argentina
FIFA U-20 World Cup
| Winner | 2005 Netherlands |
- * Club domestic league appearances and goals as of 17:18, 22 April 2026 (UTC)

Gustavo Daniel Cabral (born 14 October 1985) is an Argentine professional footballer who plays as a centre-back for Almirante Brown.

== Club career ==
Born in Isidro Casanova, Cabral made his first team debut in 2003 for Racing Club. He played 112 games for Racing until 2008, when he joined River Plate. Cabral was a first team regular in River's defense during the Torneo Clausura 2008 won by the club.

After being highly contested by River's supporters, Cabral moved abroad, joining Mexican club Tecos F.C. in June 2010. Despite being a regular with the Mexican side, he returned to his country in the following year, signing with Arsenal de Sarandí.

On 10 August 2011, Cabral was loaned to La Liga side Levante UD in a season-long deal. He made his division debut on 3 December, coming on as a second-half substitute in a 0–5 away loss against FC Barcelona. On 13 June 2012, Cabral was loaned to fellow top-divisioner Celta de Vigo. He signed permanently with the Celestes in the 2013 summer.

On 14 June 2019, after seven years with Celta, Cabral left for Mexican side C.F. Pachuca.

He was the captain of C.F. Pachuca team who won the 2024 CONCACAF Champions Cup.

== International career ==
In 2005 Cabral was part of the Argentina U20 team that won the 2005 FIFA World Youth Championship. In 2007 Cabral was called up to the national team for a friendly against Chile but did not feature in the match.

== Career statistics ==
As of 27 March 2024

| Club | Season | League | | | Cup | | International | | Other | | Total | |
| Club | Season | Division | Apps | Goals | Apps | Goals | Apps | Goals | Apps | Goals | Apps | Goals |
|---|---|---|---|---|---|---|---|---|---|---|---|---|
| River Plate | 2008–09 | Argentine Primera División | 20 | 2 | 0 | 0 | 4 (Note: Appearance(s) in Copa Sudamericana) | 1 | — | | 24 | 3 |
| River Plate | 2009–10 | Argentine Primera División | 18 | 1 | 0 | 0 | 6 (Note: Four Appearances in Copa Libertadores, Two Appearances in Copa Sudamericana) | 0 | — | | 24 | 1 |
| River Plate | Total | | 38 | 3 | 0 | 0 | 10 | 1 | — | | 48 | 4 |
| Tecos | 2010–11 | Liga MX | 30 | 1 | 0 | 0 | 0 | 0 | — | | 30 | 1 |
| Levante | 2011–12 | La Liga | 16 | 1 | 6 | 0 | 0 | 0 | — | | 22 | 1 |
| Celta de Vigo | 2012–13 | La Liga | 27 | 2 | 4 | 0 | 0 | 0 | — | | 31 | 2 |
| Celta de Vigo | 2013–14 | La Liga | 23 | 1 | 2 | 0 | 0 | 0 | — | | 25 | 1 |
| Celta de Vigo | 2014–15 | La Liga | 35 | 1 | 3 | 0 | 0 | 0 | — | | 38 | 1 |
| Celta de Vigo | 2015–16 | La Liga | 31 | 0 | 6 | 0 | 0 | 0 | — | | 37 | 0 |
| Celta de Vigo | 2016–17 | La Liga | 25 | 2 | 8 | 0 | 12 (Note: Appearance(s) in UEFA Europa League) | 1 | — | | 45 | 3 |
| Celta de Vigo | 2017–18 | La Liga | 26 | 1 | 2 | 0 | 0 | 0 | — | | 28 | 1 |
| Celta de Vigo | 2018–19 | La Liga | 24 | 0 | 1 | 0 | 0 | 0 | — | | 25 | 0 |
| Celta de Vigo | Total | | 191 | 7 | 26 | 0 | 12 | 1 | — | | 229 | 8 |
| Pachuca | 2019-20 | Liga MX | 26 | 1 | 2 | 1 | — | | — | | 28 | 2 |
| Pachuca | 2020-21 | Liga MX | 41 | 2 | — | | — | | — | | 41 | 2 |
| Pachuca | 2021-22 | Liga MX | 37 | 3 | — | | — | | 1 (Note: Appearance in 2022 MLS All-Star Game) | 0 | 38 | 3 |
| Pachuca | 2022-23 | Liga MX | 37 | 4 | — | | 3 (Note: Two appearances in CONCACAF Champions Cup, One appearance in Leagues Cup) | 0 | 1 (Note: Appearance(s) in Campeón de Campeones) | 0 | 41 | 4 |
| Pachuca | 2023-24 | Liga MX | 23 | 0 | — | | 2 (Note: Appearance(s) in CONCACAF Champions Cup) | 0 | — | | 25 | 0 |
| Pachuca | Total | | 164 | 10 | 2 | 1 | 5 | 0 | 2 | 0 | 173 | 11 |
| Career total | | | 439 | 22 | 34 | 1 | 27 | 2 | 2 | 0 | 502 | 25 |

== Honours ==
River Plate

- Argentine Primera División: 2008 Clausura

Pachuca

- Liga MX: Apertura 2022
- CONCACAF Champions Cup: 2024
- FIFA Challenger Cup: 2024
- FIFA Derby of the Americas: 2024

Argentina U20

- FIFA U-20 World Cup: 2005

Individual

- Liga MX All-Star: 2022
