= Jonny Otto =

Spanish footballer (born 1994)

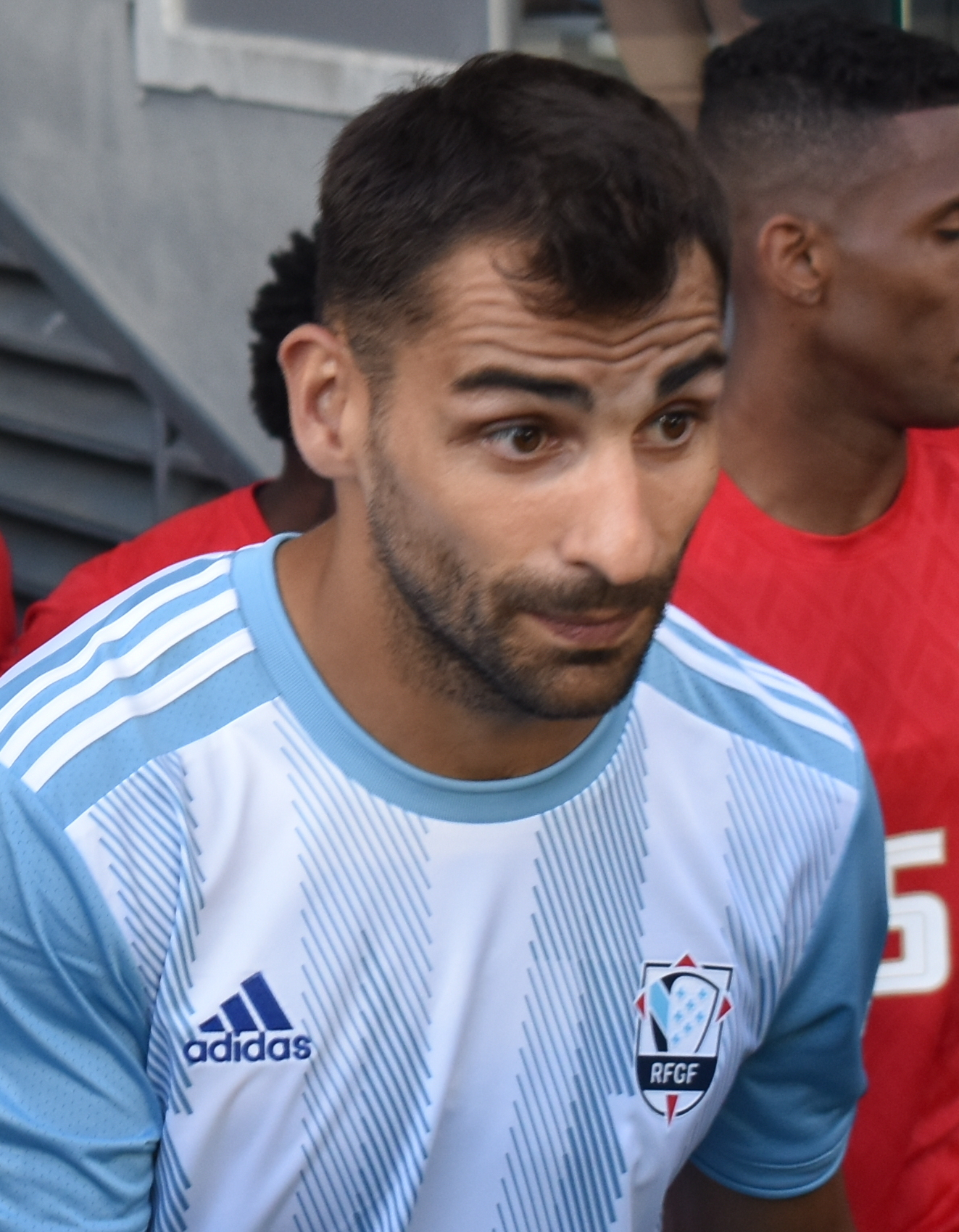
- Jonny with Galicia in 2024

Personal information
- Full name: Jonathan Castro Otto
- Date of birth: 3 March 1994 (age 32)
- Place of birth: Vigo, Spain
- Height: 1.75 m (5 ft 9 in)
- Position: Full-back

Team information
- Current team: Alavés
- Number: 17

Youth career
- Celta

Senior career*
Years	Team	Apps	(Gls)
2011–2012	Celta B	23	(0)
2012–2018	Celta	183	(3)
2018–2019	Atlético Madrid	0	(0)
2018–2019	→ Wolverhampton Wanderers (loan)	20	(1)
2019–2024	Wolverhampton Wanderers	87	(5)
2024–2025	PAOK	34	(0)
2025–	Alavés	44	(0)

International career
2012	Spain U18	2	(0)
2012	Spain U19	10	(0)
2013	Spain U20	4	(0)
2014–2017	Spain U21	18	(0)
2018	Spain	3	(0)
2024	Galicia	1	(0)
- * Club domestic league appearances and goals as of 16:41, 12 November 2026 (UTC)

Jonathan Castro Otto (born 3 March 1994), commonly known as Jonny, is a Spanish professional footballer who plays as a right or left-back for La Liga club Alavés.

He began his career with Celta, making his debut with the first team at the age of 18 and going on to appear in 221 matches in all competitions. In 2018 he signed with Wolverhampton Wanderers, initially on loan.

Jonny made three appearances for the Spain national team in 2018.

== Club career ==
=== Celta ===
Born in Vigo, Galicia, Jonny played youth football with his hometown club Celta. He spent his first season as a senior with the reserves in the Segunda División B, featuring regularly but suffering relegation.

Jonny made his La Liga debut for the main squad on 1 September 2012, starting in a 2–0 home win against Osasuna. On 5 November, he renewed his contract with until 2017.

Jonny was definitively promoted to the first team at the start of 2013–14 after the arrival of Luis Enrique as coach, and appeared in 26 matches during that campaign. On 19 January 2015, he further extended his link until 2019.

Jonny scored his first professional goal on 20 February 2016, the second in a 3–2 home victory over Eibar. He finished the season with 36 league appearances, helping the side to finish sixth and qualify for the UEFA Europa League.

On 18 January 2017, Jonny scored the 2–1 winner away against Real Madrid in the quarter-finals of the Copa del Rey (eventual 4–3 aggregate triumph).

=== Wolverhampton Wanderers ===
On 25 July 2018, Jonny joined Atlético Madrid for an undisclosed fee, signing a six-year contract but moving immediately to English club Wolverhampton Wanderers on a season-long loan. His maiden appearance in the Premier League took place on 11 August, when he played the entire 2–2 home draw against Everton.

Jonny scored his first league goal on 29 September 2018, in a 2–0 home win over Southampton. On 18 November, he suffered a knee ligament injury while playing for Spain, being initially sidelined until the end of the year but recovering a few weeks later.

Having been a regular first-team player during the first half of the campaign, Jonny agreed to a permanent four-and-a-half-year deal at Molineux on 31 January 2019 for an undisclosed fee, reported to be £15 million. In August 2020, during a Europa League tie against Olympiacos, he suffered an anterior cruciate ligament injury that sidelined him for six months.

Jonny returned to action on 7 February 2021, playing the first half of the 0–0 league draw against Leicester City. He signed a new contract shortly after, until 2025.

On 4 April 2021, Jonny suffered another serious ACL injury to the same knee while training for the upcoming fixture against West Ham United, which ruled him out for the rest of that season and the bulk of the following one. He made his return on 24 February 2022, as a second-half substitute in a Premier League game at Arsenal.

Jonny marked his 100th competitive game for Wolves on 18 March 2022 by scoring the first goal in the 3–2 home loss to Leeds United, his first goal since July 2020. He repeated the feat in the subsequent match, a 2–1 home defeat of local rivals Aston Villa.

On 31 March 2023, Jonny was awarded with the Premier League Goal of the Month, courtesy of his 41-yard shot in the 4–2 home loss to Leeds thirteen days earlier. This also represented the first occasion a club player had won the accolade since its creation in 2016.

Despite being placed on the transfer list at the beginning of the 2023–24 season, Jonny rejected offers to return to Spain; he then informed his team's hierarchy that he wanted to 'fight for his place.' However, having made only three appearances up until that point, on 4 December it was revealed that the week before a match against Arsenal at the Emirates, he was excluded from the squad after swinging an elbow at under-21 player Tawanda Chirewa and spitting at coaching staff during a training session. Four days later, sporting director Matt Hobbs announced that the player would not train with the main squad until the end of January, while manager Gary O'Neil said that he could eventually make his return in case he was not transferred during the winter transfer window; however, after five and a half years at Wolverhampton, on 26 January 2024 his contract was cancelled by mutual consent.

=== PAOK ===
On 29 January 2024, Jonny signed a one-and-a-half-year deal with Super League Greece club PAOK. He won the national championship in his debut campaign, contributing 12 matches to the feat.

=== Later career ===
The 31-year-old Jonny returned to his country in July 2025, agreeing to a two-year contract at top-tier Deportivo Alavés.

== International career ==
After playing for Spain at under-18, under-19, under-20 and under-21 levels, Jonny was called up to the full side on 26 May 2015, for a friendly with Costa Rica and a UEFA Euro 2016 qualifier against Belarus. He did not take part in any of those matches, however.

Jonny won his first cap for his country on 11 October 2018, contributing to a 4–1 friendly defeat of Wales at the Millennium Stadium after replacing César Azpilicueta in the 63rd minute.

== Personal life ==
Jonny is of German descent through his mother.

== Career statistics ==
=== Club ===
As of match played 6 November 2026

Appearances and goals by club, season and competition
Club	Season	League			National cup (Note: Includes Copa del Rey, FA Cup, Greek Football Cup)		League cup (Note: Includes EFL Cup)		Continental		Total	
Club	Season	Division	Apps	Goals	Apps	Goals	Apps	Goals	Apps	Goals	Apps	Goals
Celta B	2011–12	Segunda División B	23	0	—		—		—		23	0
Celta	2012–13	La Liga	19	0	1	0	—		—		20	0
Celta	2013–14	La Liga	26	0	2	0	—		—		28	0
Celta	2014–15	La Liga	36	0	3	0	—		—		39	0
Celta	2015–16	La Liga	36	1	8	1	—		—		44	2
Celta	2016–17	La Liga	30	0	8	1	—		12 (Note: Appearances in UEFA Europa League)	0	50	1
Celta	2017–18	La Liga	36	2	4	0	—		—		40	2
Celta	Total		183	3	26	2	—		12	0	221	5
Atlético Madrid	2018–19	La Liga	0	0	0	0	—		0	0	0	0
Wolverhampton Wanderers	2018–19	Premier League	33	1	5	0	1	0	—		39	1
Wolverhampton Wanderers	2019–20	Premier League	35	2	2	0	0	0	11	0	48	2
Wolverhampton Wanderers	2020–21	Premier League	7	0	1	0	0	0	—		8	0
Wolverhampton Wanderers	2021–22	Premier League	13	2	0	0	0	0	—		13	2
Wolverhampton Wanderers	2022–23	Premier League	18	1	2	0	3	0	—		23	1
Wolverhampton Wanderers	2023–24	Premier League	1	0	0	0	2	0	—		3	0
Wolverhampton Wanderers	Total		107	6	10	0	6	0	11	0	134	6
PAOK	2023–24	Super League Greece	12	0	2	0	—		4 (Note: Appearances in UEFA Europa Conference League)	0	18	0
PAOK	2024–25	Super League Greece	22	0	1	0	—		12 (Note: One appearance in UEFA Champions League, eleven appearances in UEFA Europa League)	0	35	0
PAOK	Total		34	0	3	0	—		16	0	53	0
Alavés	2025–26	La Liga	34	0	3	0	—		—		37	0
Alavés	2026–27	La Liga	10	0	0	0	—		—		10	0
Alavés	Total		44	0	3	0	—		—		47	0
Career total			391	9	42	2	6	0	39	0	478	11

=== International ===
Appearances and goals by national team and year
National team	Year	Apps	Goals
Spain	2018	3	0
Total		3	0

== Honours ==
PAOK

- Super League Greece: 2023–24

Spain U19

- UEFA European Under-19 Championship: 2012

Spain U21

- UEFA European Under-21 Championship runner-up: 2017

Individual

- Premier League Goal of the Month: March 2023
