= Toni Dovale =

Spanish footballer (born 1990)

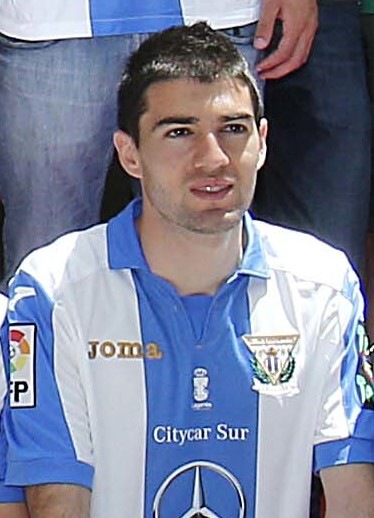
- Dovale with Leganés in 2016

Personal information
- Full name: Antonio Rodríguez Dovale
- Date of birth: 4 April 1990 (age 36)
- Place of birth: A Coruña, Spain
- Height: 1.77 m (5 ft 10 in)
- Position: Winger

Youth career
- Ural CF
- 2000–2002: Obradoiro
- 2002–2005: Barcelona
- 2005–2007: Celta

Senior career*
Years	Team	Apps	(Gls)
2007–2010	Celta B	26	(6)
2009–2014	Celta	68	(4)
2011	→ Huesca (loan)	16	(1)
2014	Sporting Kansas City	19	(1)
2015	Lugo	20	(3)
2015–2017	Leganés	14	(1)
2017	Rayo Vallecano	2	(0)
2017–2018	Bengaluru	13	(0)
2018–2019	Nea Salamina	0	(0)
2018–2019	→ East Bengal (loan)	11	(0)
2019–2020	Navy	8	(2)
2021	El Ejido	18	(0)
2021–2022	Eastern	4	(0)
2022–2023	Coruxo	2	(0)
Total		221	(18)
- * Club domestic league appearances and goals

Antonio "Toni" Rodríguez Dovale (born 4 April 1990) is a Spanish former professional footballer who played as a left winger.

== Club career ==
=== Celta ===
Dovale was born in A Coruña, Galicia, playing youth football with FC Barcelona amongst other clubs. Aged 19, he made his professional debut with local RC Celta de Vigo, starting in a 1–2 Segunda División home loss against CD Numancia on 29 August 2009. He started his career as a winger.

In the 2011–12 season, after a brief loan spell with SD Huesca of the same tier, Dovale contributed 30 games (only nine starts, 1.141 minutes of action) and two goals to help his team to return to La Liga after an absence of five years. He made his debut in the competition on 18 August 2012, coming on as a late substitute in the 0–1 home defeat to Málaga CF.

Even though his future seemed uncertain at Celta following the appointment of coach Luis Enrique in summer 2013, Dovale managed to remain with the club, being successfully reconverted into left-back in the process. However, he eventually became surplus to requirements, with even right-footed Jonny being played in his position.

=== Sporting KC ===
On 11 March 2014, Dovale signed with Sporting Kansas City of Major League Soccer. He made his debut for his new team on 5 April, playing the last ten minutes of the 0–0 home draw against Real Salt Lake.

Dovale scored his first goal in the competition on 27 May 2014, in a 1–1 draw with the New York Red Bulls also at Children's Mercy Park. His contract expired on 31 December and was not renewed.

=== Lugo ===
On 29 January 2015, Dovale signed a six-month deal with second-tier CD Lugo. He was an ever-present figure during his spell, starting in 16 of his league appearances and scoring his first goal on 22 March to help defeat Deportivo Alavés 3–2 at home.

=== Later years ===
On 10 July 2015, Dovale moved to CD Leganés in the same league after agreeing to a one-year contract. Roughly two years later, he left Rayo Vallecano and signed a one-year deal with Indian Super League club Bengaluru FC.

On 9 September 2018, Dovale joined Cypriot First Division side Nea Salamis Famagusta FC. On 10 December, he returned to India after transferring to East Bengal FC on a loan deal.

In July 2019, the 29-year-old Dovale moved clubs and countries again, signing a four-month contract with Thai League 2 club Royal Thai Navy FC. Following a spell in the Hong Kong Premier League with Eastern Sports Club, he returned to both his homeland and his native region in October 2022 after joining Coruxo FC of the Segunda Federación.

== Personal life ==
Dovale was a trained pharmacist, and worked at his family's pharmacy in La Coruna during the coronavirus pandemic of 2020.

== Career statistics ==
As of match played on 20 April 2018

Club	Season	League			Cup		Continental		Total	
Club	Season	Division	Apps	Goals	Apps	Goals	Apps	Goals	Apps	Goals
Celta B	2007–08	Segunda División B	5	0	—		—		5	0
Celta B	2008–09	Segunda División B	1	0	—		—		1	0
Celta B	2009–10	Segunda División B	20	6	—		—		20	6
Celta B	Total		26	6	—		—		26	6
Celta	2009–10	Segunda División	12	2	4	0	—		16	2
Celta	2010–11	Segunda División	0	0	1	0	—		1	0
Celta	2011–12	Segunda División	30	2	4	1	—		34	3
Celta	2012–13	La Liga	14	0	2	0	—		16	0
Celta	2013–14	La Liga	12	0	1	0	—		13	0
Celta	Total		68	4	12	1	—		80	5
Huesca (loan)	2010–11	Segunda División	16	1	0	0	—		16	1
Sporting Kansas City	2014	Major League Soccer	19	1	2	0	4 (Note: Appearances in CONCACAF Champions League)	3	25	4
Lugo	2014–15	Segunda División	20	3	0	0	—		20	3
Leganés	2015–16	Segunda División	14	1	4	0	—		18	1
Leganés	2016–17	La Liga	0	0	1	0	—		1	0
Leganés	Total		14	1	5	0	—		19	1
Rayo Vallecano	2016–17	Segunda División	2	0	0	0	—		2	0
Bengaluru	2017–18	Indian Super League	13	0	2	0	8 (Note: Appearances in AFC Cup)	3	23	3
Career total			178	16	21	1	12	6	211	23
