= Javi Varas =

Spanish footballer

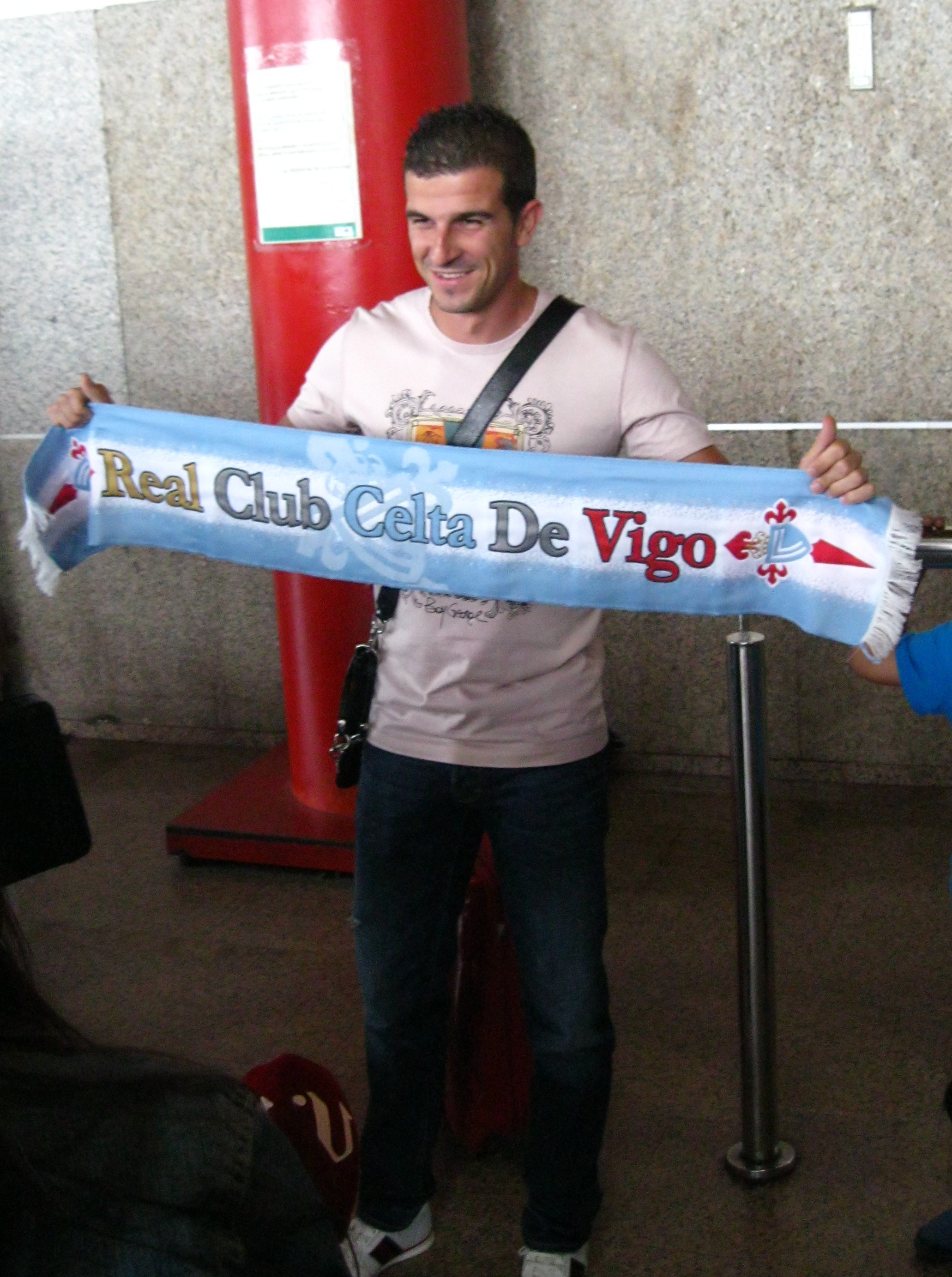
- Varas with Celta in 2012

Personal information
- Full name: Javier Varas Herrera
- Date of birth: 10 September 1982 (age 44)
- Place of birth: Seville, Spain
- Height: 1.82 m (6 ft 0 in)
- Position: Goalkeeper

Youth career
- 1993–1999: Pablo Blanco
- 1999–2001: Nervión

Senior career*
Years	Team	Apps	(Gls)
2001–2003	Nervión		
2003–2008	Sevilla B	81	(0)
2003–2004	→ San José (loan)		
2004–2005	→ Alcalá (loan)	20	(0)
2008–2014	Sevilla	60	(0)
2012–2013	→ Celta (loan)	35	(0)
2014–2015	Valladolid	38	(0)
2015–2017	Las Palmas	56	(0)
2017–2018	Granada	38	(0)
2019	Huesca	0	(0)
Total		328	(0)
- * Club domestic league appearances and goals

Javier 'Javi' Varas Herrera (born 10 September 1982) is a Spanish former professional footballer who played as a goalkeeper.

He appeared in 151 La Liga matches over eight seasons, in representation of Sevilla, Celta and Las Palmas. He added 117 games in the Segunda División, in an 18-year senior career.

== Club career ==
=== Sevilla ===
Born in Seville, Andalusia, Varas arrived at Sevilla aged 23 after having only played amateur football in his native region (although he had been bought by the club two years earlier). He spent his first three seasons with the B team, contributing 15 games in 2006–07 as they were promoted to Segunda División for the first time ever, and occasionally training with the main squad.

After David Cobeño moved to Rayo Vallecano, Varas became Andrés Palop's backup, making his La Liga debut on 17 January 2009 in a 1–0 home win against Numancia. For a full month, following an injury to the latter in October, he was again called on for starting duties, only conceding once in four matches, in the 3–1 away victory over VfB Stuttgart for that campaign's UEFA Champions League.

Varas became Sevilla's first choice midway through 2010–11, over the 37-year-old Palop. He appeared in 21 games as the side finished fifth and qualified for the UEFA Europa League.

Under new manager Marcelino García Toral, Varas continued as a regular starter. On 22 October 2011, he put on a Player of the match performance against Barcelona, saving eight shots – including an injury-time penalty from Lionel Messi – in an eventual 0–0 away draw.

Varas lost his importance in the following years, following the arrival of Portuguese Beto in January 2013. He made nine appearances as Sevilla won the 2013–14 Europa League, but was an unused substitute in the decisive match itself.

=== Valladolid ===
On 25 August 2014, Varas joined Real Valladolid on a one-year contract. He only missed four league matches in his only season, as his team narrowly missed out on play-off promotion.

=== Later career ===
On 12 July 2015, Varas signed a two-year deal with Las Palmas, newly promoted to the top division. On 13 June 2017, after having contributed to their consecutive permanence, the free agent returned to the second tier and his native region by agreeing to a two-year contract at Granada.

Varas joined Huesca on 19 February 2019, for the remainder of the top-flight campaign. In October, he announced his retirement at the age of 37.

== Career statistics ==
Appearances and goals by club, season and competition
Club	Season	League			National cup		Europe		Other		Total	
Club	Season	Division	Apps	Goals	Apps	Goals	Apps	Goals	Apps	Goals	Apps	Goals
Sevilla B	2005–06	Segunda División B	27	0	—		—		3 (Note: Appearances in Segunda División B play-offs)	0	30	0
Sevilla B	2006–07	Segunda División B	13	0	—		—		2	0	15	0
Sevilla B	2007–08	Segunda División	41	0	—		—		—		41	0
Sevilla B	Total		81	0	0	0	—		5	0	86	0
Alcalá (loan)	2004–05	Segunda División B	20	0	1	0	—		—		21	0
Sevilla	2006–07	La Liga	0	0	0	0	0	0	0	0	0	0
Sevilla	2008–09	La Liga	3	0	2	0	0	0	—		5	0
Sevilla	2009–10	La Liga	5	0	3	0	3 (Note: Appearances in UEFA Champions League)	0	—		11	0
Sevilla	2010–11	La Liga	21	0	5	0	2 (Note: Appearances in UEFA Europa League)	0	0	0	28	0
Sevilla	2011–12	La Liga	25	0	3	0	0	0	—		28	0
Sevilla	2013–14	La Liga	6	0	2	0	9	0	—		17	0
Sevilla	Total		60	0	14	0	14	0	0	0	88	0
Celta (loan)	2012–13	La Liga	35	0	0	0	—		—		35	0
Valladolid	2014–15	Segunda División	38	0	1	0	—		2 (Note: Appearances in La Liga play-offs)	0	41	0
Las Palmas	2015–16	La Liga	31	0	0	0	—		—		31	0
Las Palmas	2016–17	La Liga	25	0	0	0	—		—		25	0
Las Palmas	Total		56	0	0	0	—		—		56	0
Granada	2017–18	Segunda División	38	0	0	0	—		—		38	0
Career total			328	0	15	0	14	0	7	0	364	0

== Honours ==
Sevilla B

- Segunda División B: 2006–07

Sevilla

- Copa del Rey: 2009–10
- UEFA Europa League: 2013–14
