= Álex López (footballer, born 1988) =

Spanish footballer (born 1988)

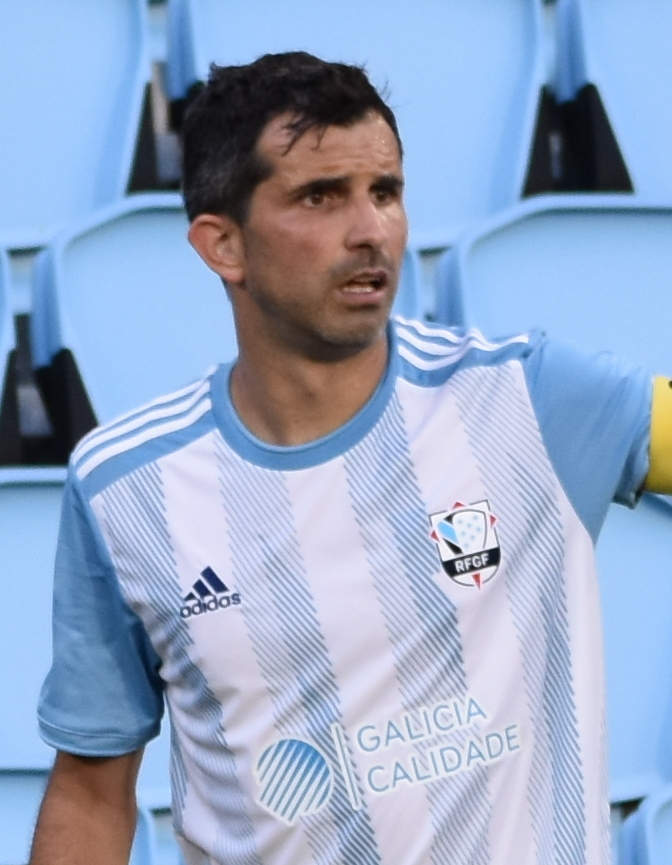
- López with Galicia in 2024

Personal information
- Full name: Alejandro López Sánchez
- Date of birth: 11 January 1988 (age 38)
- Place of birth: Ferrol, Spain
- Height: 1.75 m (5 ft 9 in)
- Position: Midfielder

Youth career
- Hórreo
- 1999–2000: San Pedro
- 2000–2002: San Rosendo
- 2002–2005: Racing Ferrol

Senior career*
Years	Team	Apps	(Gls)
2005–2006	Racing Ferrol	5	(0)
2005–2006	→ O Val (loan)	19	(4)
2006–2009	Narón	87	(19)
2009–2010	Celta B	36	(13)
2010–2017	Celta	162	(17)
2015–2016	→ Sheffield Wednesday (loan)	24	(0)
2016–2017	→ Valladolid (loan)	30	(1)
2017–2018	Sporting Gijón	9	(0)
2018–2019	Brisbane Roar	25	(3)
2019–2025	Racing Ferrol	150	(9)
Total		547	(66)

International career
2004	Spain U16	1	(0)
2005	Spain U17	2	(0)
2024	Galicia	1	(0)
- * Club domestic league appearances and goals

Alejandro "Álex" López Sánchez (born 11 January 1988) is a Spanish former professional footballer who played as a central midfielder.

== Club career ==
=== Early years ===
Born in Ferrol, Galicia, López graduated from Racing Ferrol's youth system, and made his professional debut on 14 May 2005 when he came on as a late substitute in a 2–2 home draw against Tenerife in the Segunda División. In July, he was loaned to O Val of the Tercera División.

López returned to Racing in June 2006, and after appearing sparingly in the first part of the season (with his team now in the Segunda División B), he cancelled his contract and joined Narón of the fourth tier, where he excelled.

=== Celta ===
In June 2009, López joined Celta, initially being assigned to the reserves in the third division. After scoring 13 goals with the B team, he made his official debut with the main squad on 13 June 2010, playing 14 minutes in a 2–0 away loss to Real Sociedad. On 13 February 2013, he renewed his link until 2018.

On 9 July 2015, López signed a contract extension with Celta until 2019, being immediately loaned to Sheffield Wednesday. A year later, still owned by the former, he joined Real Valladolid.

=== Later career ===
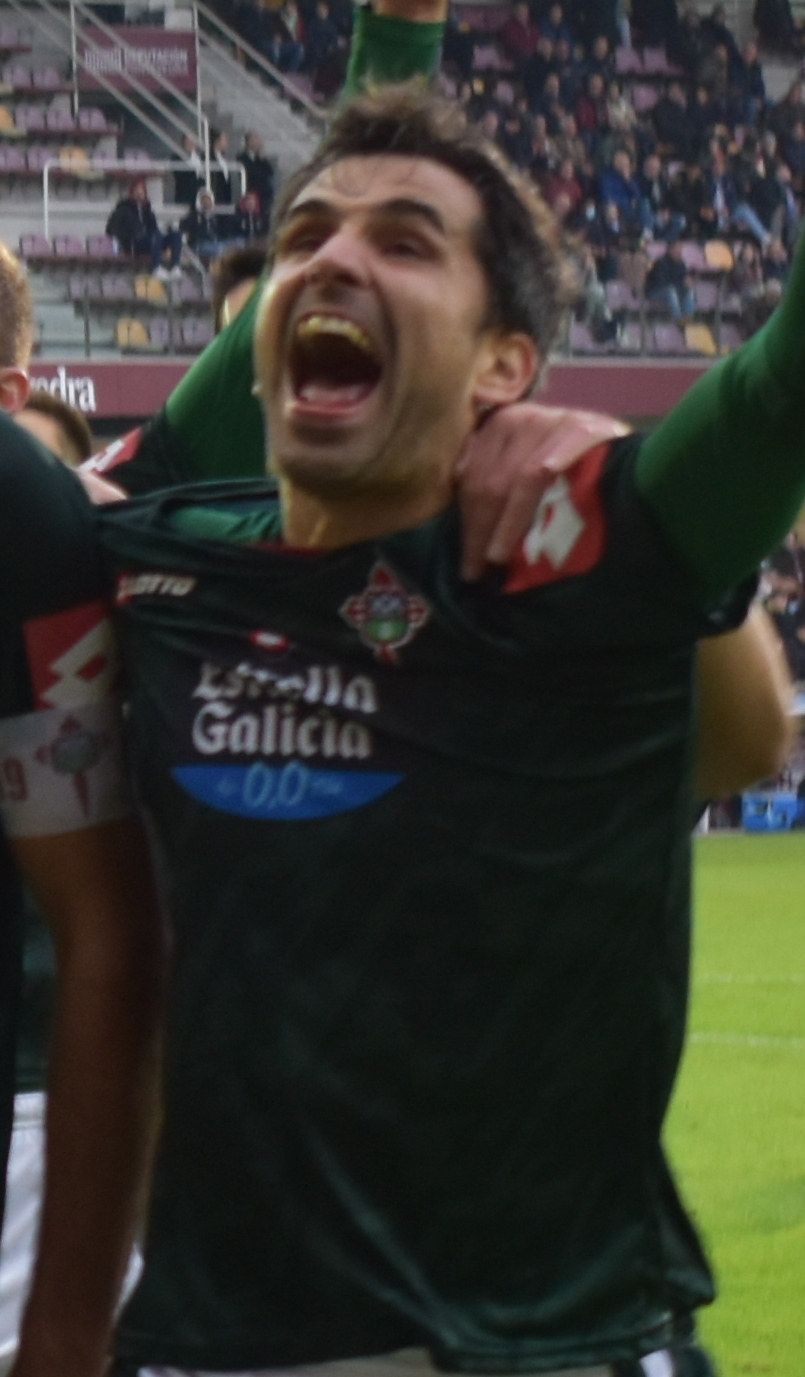
López with Racing Ferrol in 2022

López spent the 2017–18 campaign with Sporting Gijón also in the second tier. He appeared in only 13 competitive matches during his spell, mainly due to lower back problems.

On 28 September 2018, López joined Brisbane Roar on a one-year deal. Following his one season in the Australian A-League, he returned to third-division Racing Ferrol in June.

López contributed 37 games and four goals (play-offs included) in 2022–23, as Racing won their group and returned to the professional leagues 15 years later. On 3 February 2025, he announced his retirement aged 37 in order to make room for new signings, but remained connected to the club in directorial capacities.

== Career statistics ==
As of match played 9 May 2021

Appearances and goals by club, season and competition
Club	Season	League			National Cup		League Cup		Other		Total	
Club	Season	Division	Apps	Goals	Apps	Goals	Apps	Goals	Apps	Goals	Apps	Goals
Racing Ferrol	2004–05	Segunda División	2	0	0	0	—		—		2	0
Racing Ferrol	2005–06	Segunda División	0	0	0	0	—		—		0	0
Racing Ferrol	2006–07	Segunda División B	3	0	1	0	—		—		4	0
Racing Ferrol	Total		5	0	1	0	0	0	0	0	6	0
Celta B	2009–10	Segunda División B	36	13	—		—		—		36	13
Celta	2009–10	Segunda División	2	0	0	0	—		—		2	0
Celta	2010–11	Segunda División	35	3	1	0	—		1 (Note: Appearances in La Liga play-offs)	0	37	3
Celta	2011–12	Segunda División	36	6	2	0	—		—		38	6
Celta	2012–13	La Liga	33	2	1	0	—		—		34	2
Celta	2013–14	La Liga	31	5	2	0	—		—		33	5
Celta	2014–15	La Liga	25	1	3	1	—		—		28	2
Celta	Total		162	17	9	1	0	0	1	0	172	18
Sheffield Wednesday (loan)	2015–16	Championship	24	0	1	0	2	0	—		27	0
Valladolid (loan)	2016–17	Segunda División	30	1	1	0	—		—		31	1
Sporting Gijón	2017–18	Segunda División	9	0	2	0	—		2	0	13	0
Brisbane Roar	2018–19	A-League	25	3	0	0	—		—		25	3
Racing Ferrol	2019–20	Segunda División B	17	2	1	0	—		—		18	2
Racing Ferrol	2020–21	Segunda División B	21	2	0	0	—		—		21	2
Racing Ferrol	Total		38	4	1	0	0	0	0	0	39	4
Career total			329	38	15	1	2	0	3	0	349	39
