= Roberto Lago =

Spanish footballer

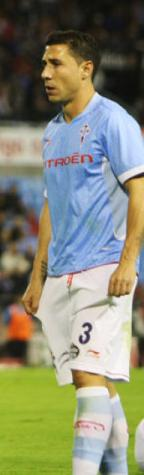
- Lago playing with Celta in 2012

Personal information
- Full name: Roberto Lago Soto
- Date of birth: 30 August 1985 (age 41)
- Place of birth: Vigo, Spain
- Height: 1.78 m (5 ft 10 in)
- Position: Left-back

Youth career
- 1995–2004: Celta

Senior career*
Years	Team	Apps	(Gls)
2004–2007	Celta B	84	(4)
2007–2013	Celta	193	(6)
2013–2016	Getafe	52	(0)
2016–2018	APOEL	37	(1)
Total		366	(11)
- * Club domestic league appearances and goals

Roberto Lago Soto (Spanish pronunciation: [roˈβeɾto ˈlaɣo ˈsoto]; born 30 August 1985) is a Spanish former professional footballer who played as a left-back.

He spent the better part of his career with Celta and Getafe, totalling 159 games in the Segunda División (six goals) and 86 in La Liga. In 2016, he signed with Cypriot club APOEL.

== Club career ==
=== Celta ===
Born in Vigo, Galicia, Lago was a product of hometown RC Celta de Vigo's youth system. He made his debut with the first team in the 2007–08 season, playing 33 matches for a Segunda División side which eventually finished 17th one year after being relegated. In the following years he was an undisputed starter when available, contributing 35 games and one goal in the 2011–12 campaign as the club returned to La Liga.

Lago's maiden appearance in the top flight was on 18 August 2012, starting in a 0–1 home loss against Málaga CF. He only missed four fixtures during the season, as Celta eventually stayed up at the expense of neighbouring Deportivo de La Coruña.

=== Getafe ===
Lago joined fellow top-tier club Getafe CF on 12 June 2013, signing a four-year deal. In his three-year spell at the Coliseum Alfonso Pérez, often marred by injury, he appeared in 58 competitive matches.

In July 2016, following the team's top-tier relegation, Lago left by triggering a release clause in his contract.

=== APOEL ===
On 9 July 2016, at nearly 31, Lago moved abroad for the first time in his career, penning a two-year contract with reigning Cypriot champions APOEL FC. He made his official debut on 10 September, playing the full 90 minutes in a 4–0 away victory over Nea Salamis Famagusta FC in the First Division.

== Career statistics ==
As of 24 May 2017

Appearances and goals by club, season and competition
Club	Season	League			Cup		Continental		Other		Total	
Club	Season	Division	Apps	Goals	Apps	Goals	Apps	Goals	Apps	Goals	Apps	Goals
Celta B	2003–04	Segunda División B	2	0	—		—		1 (Note: Appearance in Segunda División B play-offs)	0	3	0
Celta B	2004–05	Segunda División B	21	2	—		—		—		21	2
Celta B	2005–06	Segunda División B	32	2	—		—		—		32	2
Celta B	2006–07	Segunda División B	29	0	—		—		—		29	0
Celta B	Total		84	4	—		—		1	0	85	4
Celta	2007–08	Segunda División	33	1	1	0	—		—		34	1
Celta	2008–09	Segunda División	24	0	2	1	—		—		26	1
Celta	2009–10	Segunda División	32	1	5	0	—		—		37	1
Celta	2010–11	Segunda División	35	3	0	0	—		2 (Note: Appearances in La Liga play-offs)	0	37	3
Celta	2011–12	Segunda División	35	1	3	0	—		—		38	1
Celta	2012–13	La Liga	34	0	3	1	—		—		37	1
Celta	Total		193	6	14	2	—		2	0	209	8
Getafe	2013–14	La Liga	19	0	3	0	—		—		22	0
Getafe	2014–15	La Liga	16	0	3	0	—		—		19	0
Getafe	2015–16	La Liga	17	0	0	0	—		—		17	0
Getafe	Total		52	0	6	0	—		—		58	0
APOEL	2016–17	Cypriot First Division	17	0	4	0	7 (Note: Appearances in UEFA Europa League)	0	0	0	28	0
Career total			346	10	24	2	7	0	3	0	380	12

== Honours ==
APOEL

- Cypriot First Division: 2016–17, 2017–18
