= Augusto Fernández =

Argentine footballer (born 1986)

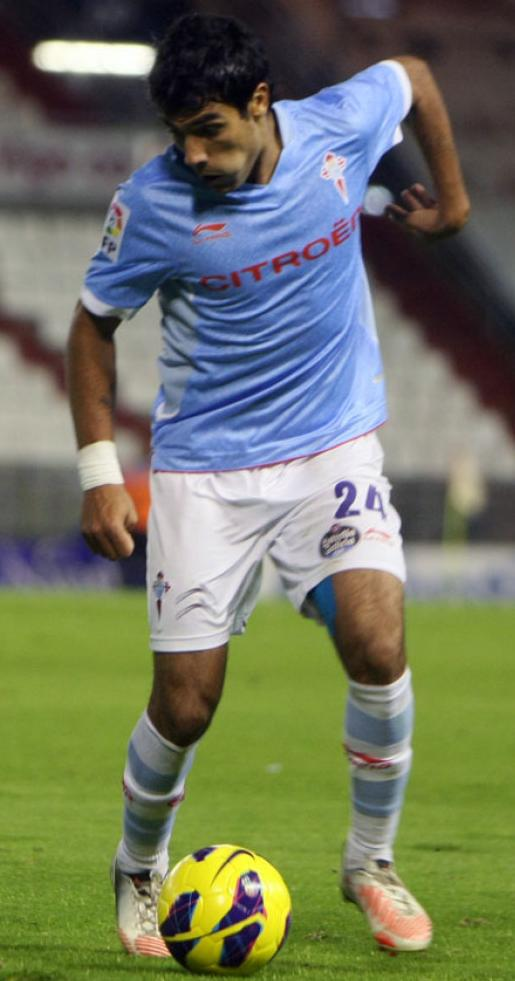
- Fernández playing for Celta in 2013

Personal information
- Full name: Augusto Matías Fernández
- Date of birth: 10 April 1986 (age 40)
- Place of birth: Pergamino, Argentina
- Height: 1.78 m (5 ft 10 in)
- Position: Midfielder

Youth career
- 2005: River Plate

Senior career*
Years	Team	Apps	(Gls)
2006–2009	River Plate	79	(3)
2009–2010	Saint-Étienne	12	(1)
2010–2012	Vélez Sarsfield	58	(11)
2012–2015	Celta	114	(10)
2016–2017	Atlético Madrid	21	(0)
2018–2020	Beijing Renhe	33	(3)
2020–2021	Cádiz	16	(0)
Total		333	(28)

International career
2011–2016	Argentina	16	(1)
Medal record
Argentina
FIFA World Cup
Runner-up	2014 Brazil	Team
Copa América
Runner-up	2016 United States	Team
- * Club domestic league appearances and goals

Augusto Matías Fernández (Latin American Spanish: [awˈɣusto maˈti.as feɾˈnandes]; born 10 April 1986) is an Argentine former professional footballer who played as a central midfielder.

He started his club career in Argentina with River Plate, before moving to French club Saint-Étienne, and then back Argentina with Vélez Sarsfield. In 2012, he moved to Spain to play with Celta and then Atlético Madrid. In 2018, he joined Chinese club Beijing Renhe, before joining Cádiz in Spain where he retired in 2021.

He made his debut for Argentina football team in 2011. He played 16 times for his country, and represented them at the 2014 World Cup, where he won a runners-up medal, and at the 2016 Copa América.

== Club career ==
=== River Plate ===
Born in Pergamino, Buenos Aires, Fernández was a River Plate youth graduate. He made his first team debut on 29 January 2006, coming on as a substitute for Jonathan Santana in a 5–0 away routing of Tiro Federal.

Fernández scored his first professional goal on 8 April 2007, netting the equalizer in a 1–1 home draw against Belgrano. With River, he won the 2008 Clausura under Diego Simeone's coaching, playing on 15 of the 19 games (nine starts).

=== Saint-Etienne ===
On 28 August 2009, after fellow Argentine Gonzalo Bergessio joined Saint-Étienne, Fernández arrived at the aforementioned French club. He was loaned to the French club by a third-party owner of his rights, Israeli businessman Pinhas Zahavi.

Fernández made his Ligue 1 debut on 13 September 2009, starting in a 0–1 loss to Rennes, and scored his first goal in the category roughly a month later in a 3–1 home win against Bordeaux. However, he only appeared in 12 matches during the campaign, as his side narrowly avoided relegation.

=== Vélez Sarsfield ===
On 9 July 2010, Fernández signed a three-year deal with Argentine Primera División side Vélez Sarsfield, who bought 100% of his rights from Pinhas Zahavi for a fee of US$1.5 million. In his first tournament with his new club, the 2010 Apertura, he played 12 games (all as a starter) on Vélez' runner-up campaign.

Fernández totalled 17 games (over 19) and 4 goals in his team's 2011 Clausura-winning campaign, and 10 games (over 12) and 4 goals in their Copa Libertadores semi-finalist campaign. During the semester, he scored in 57 days twice as many goals as he had during his entire professional career: three in the Copa Libertadores and another three in the Argentine league. Against L.D.U. Quito in the Copa Libertadores round of 16, he also scored his first double.

=== Celta ===
On 8 August 2012, Fernández joined newly promoted La Liga club Celta on a four-year deal. He made his debut in the category ten days later, starting in a 0–1 home loss against Málaga.

Fernández scored his first goal in the main category of Spanish football on 22 September 2012, netting the first in a 2–1 home win over Getafe. He finished the season as an ever-present figure for the Galicians, appearing in 36 matches and scoring six goals as his side narrowly avoided relegation.

Fernández was still a first-choice in the following campaigns, with the side now finishing in mid-table positions. On 3 October 2014, he was appointed captain of the club, replacing Borja Oubiña.

=== Atlético Madrid ===
On 1 January 2016, Fernández joined Atlético Madrid on a three-year deal for an undisclosed fee, mainly as a cover to the injured Tiago. He made his debut five days later, playing 57 minutes of a Copa del Rey draw away to Rayo Vallecano before being replaced by Luciano Vietto; he made his first league appearance for the club on 11 January, against Celta, his former team. Later, he started in the 2016 Champions League final, although he was substituted off at half-time. He only made eight appearances in the following seasons with the Rojiblancos.

=== Beijing Renhe ===
On 31 January 2018, Fernández signed with Chinese Super League club Beijing Renhe on an undisclosed fee.

=== Cádiz ===
On 23 June 2020, Fernández returned to Spain and joined Segunda División side Cádiz for the remainder of the season. He signed an extension for the following season later, with the club achieving promotion to La Liga. On 21 May 2021, after securing first division football for the upcoming season, Fernández announced his retirement from football.

== International career ==
Fernández made his full international debut for Argentina on 15 September 2011, starting in a 0–0 Superclásico de las Américas home draw against Brazil. On 2 June 2014, he was included in Alejandro Sabella's final 23-man squad for the year's FIFA World Cup, but was only an unused substitute during the whole tournament. In May 2016, he was included in Gerardo Martino's 23-man Argentina squad for the Copa América Centenario, being a starter for most of the tournament before missing the final after getting injured in the semifinal match.

== Club statistics ==
=== Club ===
Appearances and goals by club, season and competition
Club	Season	League			National Cup		International		Total	
Club	Season	Division	Apps	Goals	Apps	Goals	Apps	Goals	Apps	Goals
River Plate	2005–06	Argentine Primera División	13	0	—		2 (Note: One appearance in Copa Libertadores, One appearance in Copa Sudamericana)	0	15	0
River Plate	2006–07	Argentine Primera División	13	2	—		6 (Note: Three appearances in Copa Libertadores, Three appearances in Copa Sudamericana)	0	19	2
River Plate	2007–08	Argentine Primera División	31	1	—		8 (Note: Five appearances in Copa Libertadores, Three appearances in Copa Sudamericana)	0	39	1
River Plate	2008–09	Argentine Primera División	21	0	—		2 (Note: Appearance(s) in Copa Libertadores)	0	23	0
River Plate	2009–10	Argentine Primera División	1	0	—		—		1	0
River Plate	Total		79	3	—		18	0	97	3
Saint-Étienne	2009–10	Ligue 1	12	1	2	0	—		14	1
Vélez Sarsfield	2010–11	Argentine Primera División	29	4	0	0	11 (Note: One appearance in Copa Sudamericana, Ten appearances and one goal in Copa Libertadores)	4	40	8
Vélez Sarsfield	2011–12	Argentine Primera División	29	7	0	0	17 (Note: Eight appearances and one goal in Copa Sudamericana, Nine appearances and two goals in Copa Libertadores)	3	46	10
Vélez Sarsfield	Total		58	11	0	0	28	7	86	18
Celta	2012–13	La Liga	36	6	3	0	—		39	3
Celta	2013–14	La Liga	33	2	0	0	—		33	2
Celta	2014–15	La Liga	30	1	4	0	—		34	1
Celta	2015–16	La Liga	15	1	1	0	—		16	1
Celta	Total		114	10	8	0	—		122	10
Atlético Madrid	2015–16	La Liga	13	0	2	0	6 (Note: Appearance(s) in UEFA Champions League)	0	21	0
Atlético Madrid	2016–17	La Liga	3	0	0	0	0	0	3	0
Atlético Madrid	2017–18	La Liga	5	0	4	0	1	0	10	0
Atlético Madrid	Total		21	0	6	0	7	0	34	0
Beijing Renhe	2018	Chinese Super League	22	2	1	0	—		23	2
Beijing Renhe	2019	Chinese Super League	11	1	0	0	—		11	1
Beijing Renhe	Total		33	3	1	0	—		34	3
Cádiz	2019–20	Segunda División	4	0	0	0	—		4	0
Cádiz	2020–21	La Liga	12	0	0	0	—		12	0
Cádiz	Total		16	0	0	0	—		16	0
Career Total			333	28	17	0	53	7	403	35

=== International ===
Appearances and goals by national team and year
National team	Year	Apps	Goals
Argentina	2011	2	0
Argentina	2012	1	0
Argentina	2013	4	1
Argentina	2014	3	0
Argentina	2016	6	0
Total		16	1

=== International goals ===
#	Date	Venue	Opponent	Score	Result	Competition
1.	14 June 2013	Estadio Mateo Flores, Guatemala City, Guatemala	Guatemala	2–0	4–0	Friendly

== Honours ==
=== Club ===
River Plate

- Argentine Primera División: 2008 Clausura

Vélez Sársfield

- Argentine Primera División: 2011 Clausura

Atletico Madrid

- UEFA Champions League runner-up: 2015–16

=== International ===
Argentina

- FIFA World Cup runner-up: 2014
- Copa América runner-up: 2016
