= Jonathan Vila =

Spanish footballer (born 1986)

Personal information
- Full name: Jonathan Vila Pereira
- Date of birth: 6 March 1986 (age 40)
- Place of birth: O Porriño, Spain
- Height: 1.86 m (6 ft 1 in)
- Position: Defensive midfielder

Youth career
- Celta

Senior career*
Years	Team	Apps	(Gls)
2004–2008	Celta B	78	(5)
2006–2014	Celta	124	(0)
2014	→ Beitar Jerusalem (loan)	13	(0)
2014–2017	Oviedo	62	(2)
2017–2018	Recreativo	27	(0)
2018–2019	Pune City	16	(1)
2019–2021	Coruxo	27	(0)
Total		347	(8)
- * Club domestic league appearances and goals

Jonathan Vila Pereira (born 6 March 1986) is a Spanish former professional footballer who played as a defensive midfielder.

== Club career ==
Vila was born in O Porriño, Province of Pontevedra. Brought through the youth ranks of local team RC Celta de Vigo, he made his La Liga debut on 17 December 2006, playing 14 minutes in a 1–1 away draw against Levante UD. He totalled ten official appearances during the season, including three (also as a substitute) in the campaign's UEFA Cup as the Galicians were eventually relegated.

Vila was definitely promoted to the main squad for 2008–09, with Celta now in the Segunda División. He contributed 15 matches – 13 starts – in the 2011–12 campaign, to help the club return to the top flight after an absence of five years.

In January 2014, completely ostracised by new manager Luis Enrique, Vila was loaned to Beitar Jerusalem F.C. of the Israeli Premier League until June. In July, he terminated his contract with Celta and signed with Real Oviedo of Segunda División B.

On 23 August 2018, Vila joined Indian Super League franchise FC Pune City after one season with Recreativo de Huelva in the Spanish third tier.

== Career statistics ==
Club	Season	League			Cup		Other		Total	
Club	Season	Division	Apps	Goals	Apps	Goals	Apps	Goals	Apps	Goals
Celta B	2003–04	Segunda División B	1	0	—		—		1	0
Celta B	2004–05	Segunda División B	27	2	—		—		27	2
Celta B	2005–06	Segunda División B	31	2	—		—		31	2
Celta B	2006–07	Segunda División B	19	1	—		—		19	1
Celta B	Total		78	5	—		—		78	5
Celta	2006–07	La Liga	7	0	0	0	3 (Note: Appearances in UEFA Cup)	0	10	0
Celta	2007–08	Segunda División	9	0	1	0	—		10	0
Celta	2008–09	Segunda División	26	0	4	0	—		30	0
Celta	2009–10	Segunda División	17	0	5	0	—		22	0
Celta	2010–11	Segunda División	35	0	1	0	2 (Note: Appearances in promotion play-offs)	0	38	0
Celta	2011–12	Segunda División	15	0	3	0	—		18	0
Celta	2012–13	La Liga	14	0	3	0	—		17	0
Celta	2013–14	La Liga	1	0	2	0	—		3	0
Celta	Total		124	0	19	0	5	0	148	0
Beitar Jerusalem (loan)	2013–14	Israeli Premier League	13	0	3	0	—		16	0
Oviedo	2014–15	Segunda División B	30	1	4	0	3	0	37	1
Oviedo	2015–16	Segunda División	25	1	1	0	—		26	1
Oviedo	2016–17	Segunda División	7	0	1	0	—		8	0
Oviedo	Total		62	2	6	0	3	0	71	2
Recreativo	2017–18	Segunda División B	27	0	0	0	—		0	0
Pune City	2018–19	Indian Super League	16	1	0	0	—		16	1
Coruxo	2019–20	Segunda División B	15	0	0	0	—		15	0
Coruxo	2020–21	Segunda División B	12	0	1	0	—		13	0
Coruxo	Total		27	0	1	0	0	0	28	0
Career total			347	8	29	0	8	0	384	8

== Honours ==
Oviedo

- Segunda División B: 2014–15
