= Javi Rey (footballer, born 1991) =

Spanish footballer

Personal information
- Full name: Javier Villar Rey
- Date of birth: 20 February 1991 (age 35)
- Place of birth: Pontevedra, Spain
- Height: 1.86 m (6 ft 1 in)
- Position: Midfielder

Team information
- Current team: Arosa

Youth career
- Pontevedra
- 2009–2010: Valencia

Senior career*
Years	Team	Apps	(Gls)
2008–2009	Pontevedra B	9	(1)
2008–2009	Pontevedra	4	(0)
2010–2011	Valencia B	13	(1)
2011–2013	Lugo	34	(0)
2013–2015	Celta B	48	(1)
2013	Celta	0	(0)
2015–2016	Guijuelo	35	(0)
2016–2017	Logroñés	19	(1)
2017–2018	Badajoz	34	(2)
2018–2019	UCAM Murcia	6	(0)
2019–2021	Racing Ferrol	27	(0)
2021–2022	Pontevedra	30	(1)
2022–2023	Avilés	28	(0)
2023–2024	Talavera	20	(0)
2024–	Arosa	4	(0)
- * Club domestic league appearances and goals as of 13 October 2024

Javier "Javi" Villar Rey (born 20 February 1991) is a Spanish professional footballer who plays for Arosa as a midfielder.

== Club career ==
Born in Pontevedra, Galicia, Rey played youth football with hometown club Pontevedra CF. In late 2008 he made his debut as a senior at the age of only 17 and, the following summer, moved to Valencia CF to complete his development; during the 2009–10 season, he appeared in one game for the reserves also in the Segunda División B.

In July 2011, Rey signed a contract with CD Lugo. He contributed 22 appearances in his debut campaign (18 starts, 1,622 minutes of action), as the team returned to Segunda División after an absence of 20 years.

Rey made his debut as a professional on 1 December 2012, appearing as a late substitute in a 1–2 home loss against FC Barcelona B. On 18 July 2013 he joined RC Celta de Vigo, being initially assigned to the reserve side in the third tier.

In the following seasons, Rey all but competed in division three, with CD Guijuelo, UD Logroñés, CD Badajoz, UCAM Murcia CF and Racing de Ferrol (with the last of those clubs, he also had a very brief spell in the Tercera División).
