= Borja Oubiña =

Spanish footballer (born 1982)

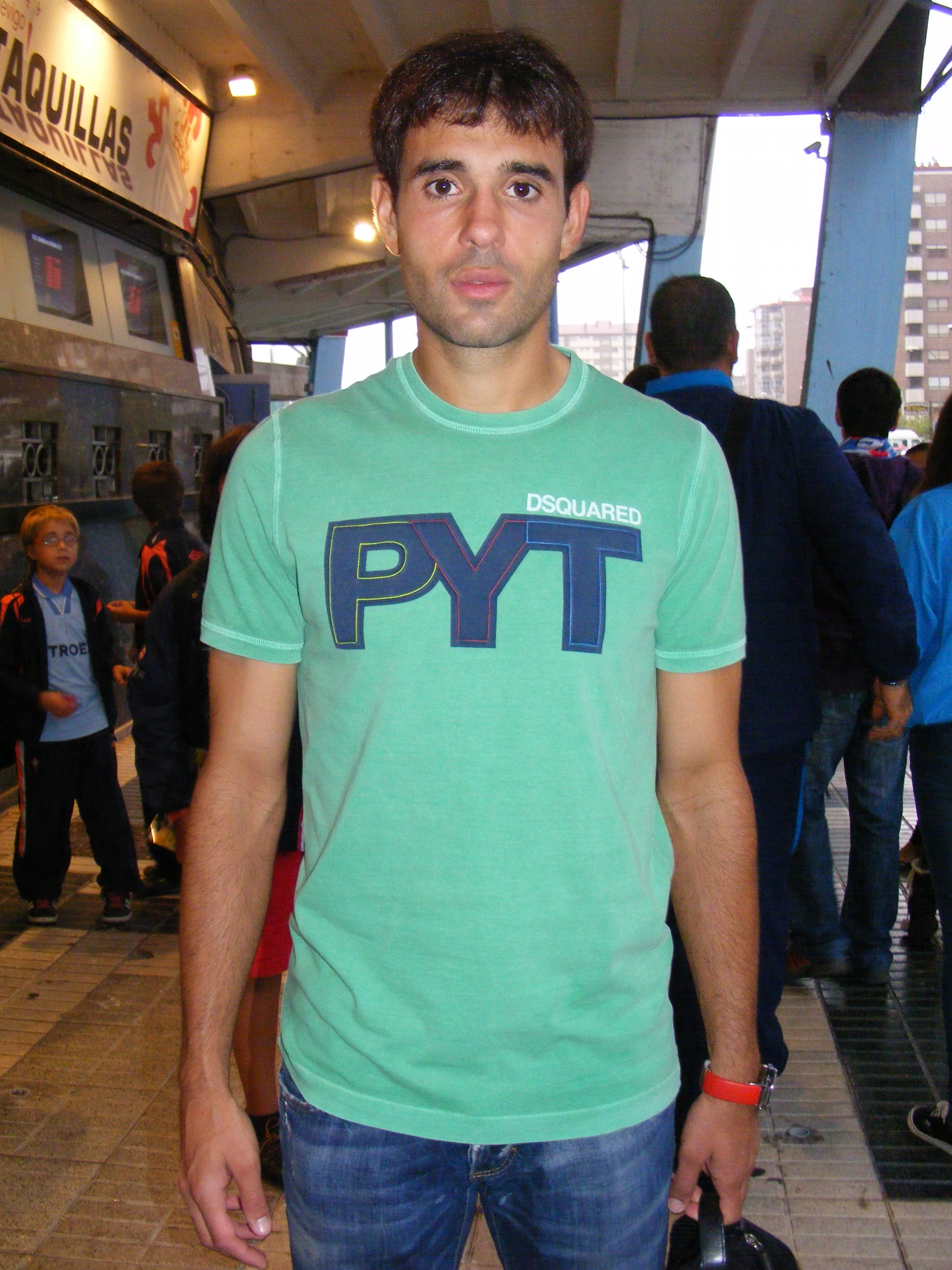
- Oubiña in 2013

Personal information
- Full name: Borja Oubiña Meléndez
- Date of birth: 17 May 1982 (age 44)
- Place of birth: Vigo, Spain
- Height: 1.81 m (5 ft 11 in)
- Position: Defensive midfielder

Youth career
- 1989–1990: Moledo
- 1989–1996: Gran Peña
- 1996–1999: Celta

Senior career*
Years	Team	Apps	(Gls)
1999–2004	Celta B	131	(6)
2004–2015	Celta	217	(5)
2007–2008	→ Birmingham City (loan)	2	(0)
Total		350	(11)

International career
2006	Spain	2	(0)
- * Club domestic league appearances and goals

Borja Oubiña Meléndez (born 17 May 1982) is a Spanish former professional footballer who played as a defensive midfielder.

After starting his career at local Celta, he played in England with Birmingham City in 2007, but his spell was immediately cut short with a severe knee injury, which would relapse the following years. He appeared in 236 competitive matches for his main club, with whom he spent five La Liga seasons.

== Club career ==
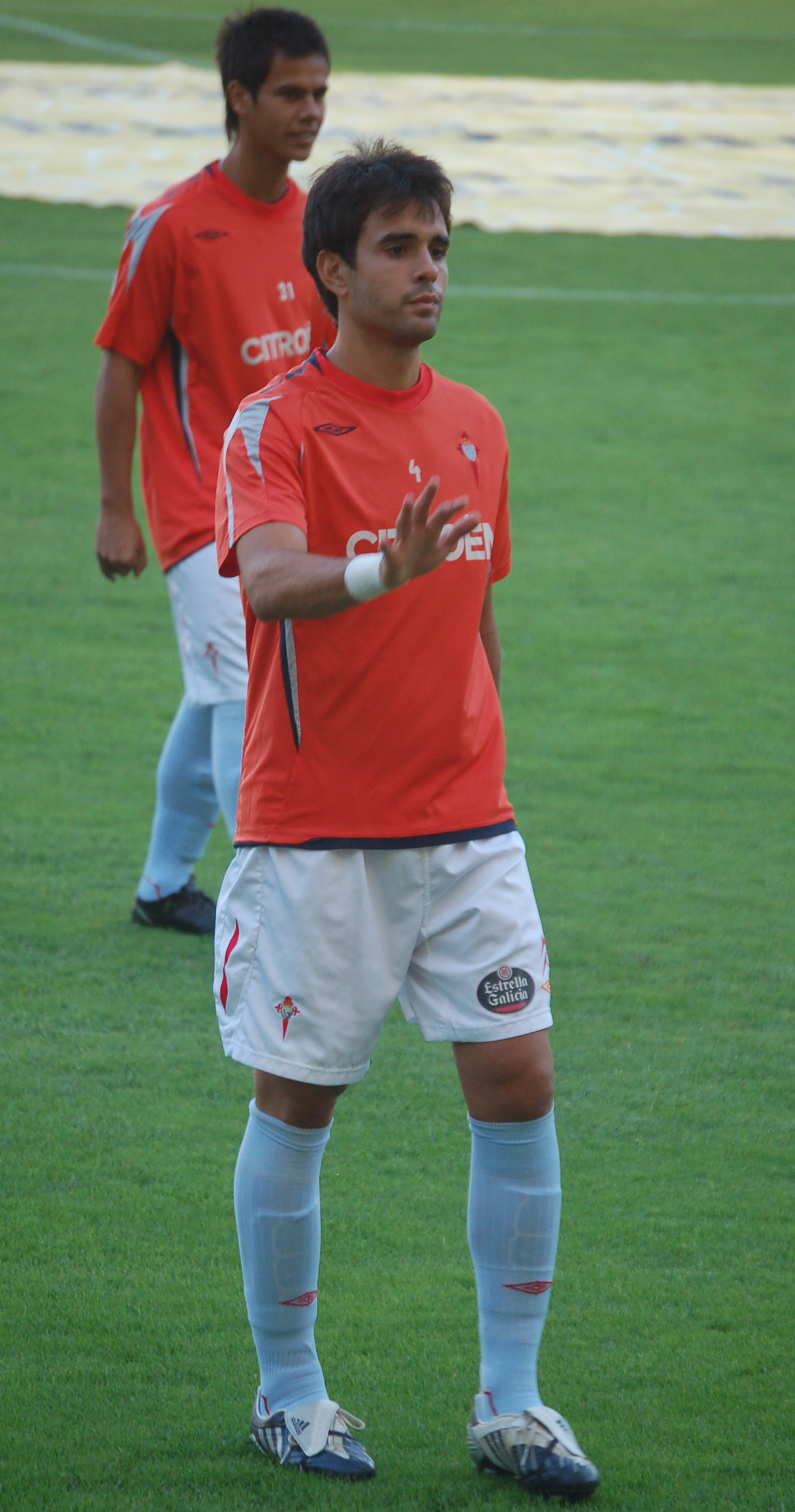
Oubiña training with Celta in 2009

A ball-winning midfielder who came through the youth teams of hometown club Celta de Vigo, Oubiña was born in Vigo, and he first appeared with the first team – courtesy of Miguel Ángel Lotina – during 2003–04 in a 2–2 away draw against Valencia, as the Galicians, then also participating in the UEFA Champions League, eventually finished second from bottom in La Liga; he became a mainstay in the subsequent seasons under Fernando Vázquez.

After Celta's top-flight relegation in the 2006–07 campaign, Oubiña stated his desire to leave although still under contract. As of August, it seemed that countryman José Antonio Camacho's Benfica were in pole position to acquire his services, but an agreement could not be reached on a fee – rumoured to be €10 million.

On 31 August 2007, a one-year loan to Premier League side Birmingham City was agreed. Oubiña made his competitive debut on 15 September, as a late substitute against Bolton Wanderers; after 13 minutes of the next match, at Liverpool, he sustained an injury in a collision with Dirk Kuyt to his left anterior cruciate ligament, and was expected to be sidelined for at least six months.

On 9 February 2008, Oubiña's loan spell at Birmingham was cancelled by mutual consent, and he returned to Vigo to start his recovery. On 6 December, more than a year after his last appearance, he played four minutes in a 2–0 loss at Las Palmas, and made a further 14 appearances in the season; he relapsed in mid-September 2009, and underwent surgery in October preparatory to the planned reconstruction of his cruciate ligament in early 2010, after which he would miss the remainder of 2009–10.

Oubiña returned to full fitness in the 2011–12 campaign, playing 28 matches (24 starts, 2,120 minutes of action) as Celta returned to the top tier after a five-year absence. In 2014–15, however, he again failed to appear in any games due to injury.

On 22 May 2015, five days after his 33rd birthday, Oubiña announced his retirement.

== International career ==
Oubiña earned two caps for the Spain national team, the first coming on 2 September 2006 against Liechtenstein in Badajoz (4–0 victory): he came on as a substitute for David Albelda in the second half of a UEFA Euro 2008 qualifier.

== Career statistics ==
Club	Season	League			Cup		Continental		Total	
Club	Season	Division	Apps	Goals	Apps	Goals	Apps	Goals	Apps	Goals
Celta	2003–04	La Liga	12	0	1	0	2 (Note: Appearances in UEFA Champions League)	0	15	0
Celta	2004–05	Segunda División	30	1	1	0	—		31	1
Celta	2005–06	La Liga	36	1	2	0	—		38	1
Celta	2006–07	La Liga	30	1	1	0	7 (Note: Appearances in UEFA Cup)	0	38	1
Celta	2007–08	Segunda División	1	0	0	0	—		1	0
Celta	2008–09	Segunda División	15	0	0	0	—		15	0
Celta	2009–10	Segunda División	0	0	0	0	—		0	0
Celta	2010–11	Segunda División	4	0	0	0	—		4	0
Celta	2011–12	Segunda División	28	0	3	0	—		31	0
Celta	2012–13	La Liga	36	1	2	0	—		38	1
Celta	2013–14	La Liga	25	1	0	0	—		25	1
Celta	2014–15	La Liga	0	0	0	0	—		0	0
Celta	Total		217	5	10	0	9	0	236	5
Birmingham City (loan)	2007–08	Premier League	2	0	0	0	—		2	0
Career total			219	5	10	0	9	0	238	5
