= Fabián Orellana =

Chilean footballer (born 1986)

Personal information
- Full name: Fabián Ariel Orellana Valenzuela
- Date of birth: 27 January 1986 (age 40)
- Place of birth: Santiago, Chile
- Height: 1.68 m (5 ft 6 in)
- Position: Winger

Youth career
- Colo-Colo
- 2000–2005: Audax Italiano

Senior career*
Years	Team	Apps	(Gls)
2005–2009	Audax Italiano	117	(27)
2009–2011	Udinese	0	(0)
2009–2010	→ Xerez (loan)	26	(2)
2010–2011	→ Granada (loan)	39	(8)
2011–2013	Granada	17	(0)
2011–2012	→ Celta (loan)	37	(13)
2013–2017	Celta	120	(19)
2017	→ Valencia (loan)	16	(1)
2017–2018	Valencia	0	(0)
2018	→ Eibar (loan)	17	(3)
2018–2020	Eibar	62	(11)
2020–2021	Valladolid	30	(6)
2021–2022	Universidad Católica	20	(0)
Total		501	(90)

International career
2008–2021	Chile	44	(2)
Medal record
Representing Chile
Winner	Copa América Centenario	2016
- * Club domestic league appearances and goals

Fabián Ariel Orellana Valenzuela (Latin American Spanish: [faˈβjan oɾeˈʝana]; born 27 January 1986) is a Chilean former professional footballer who played as a winger.

After starting out at Audax Italiano, he went on to spend most of his career in Spain, where he represented Xerez, Granada, Celta, Valencia, Eibar and Valladolid. Over ten seasons, he amassed La Liga totals of 288 games and 42 goals with all the clubs.

A Chilean international since 2008, Orellana appeared in two World Cups and the Copa América Centenario, winning the latter tournament.

== Club career ==
Born in Santiago, Orellana began his career in Colo-Colo and then moved to Audax Italiano. He made his Primera División debut at only 18, and scored 12 league goals in 38 games in the 2007 season as his team finished third in the Apertura, won their Clausura group and reached the semi-finals in the play-offs.

Orellana signed with Udinese Calcio in Italy on 23 May 2009, for €3.2 million, being immediately loaned to Xerez CD in the Spanish Segunda División. In the following campaign he continued in that country and tier, joining Granada CF also in a temporary deal and being a solid contributor as the Andalusians returned to La Liga after a 35-year absence, netting seven times – plus once in the play-offs– in 2,673 minutes of play (he was also sent off three times).

In the middle of 2011, Orellana became the property of Granada. In September he was loaned to another Spanish second-division club, RC Celta de Vigo.

Orellana was acquired permanently by the Galicians in early January 2013. On 5 April 2015, he was sent off in the dying minutes of a 1–0 home loss to FC Barcelona for throwing a piece of turf at Sergio Busquets' face.

On 31 January 2017, after a serious run-in with manager Eduardo Berizzo, Orellana signed a four-month loan with Valencia CF in the same league, with the possibility of making the move permanent until June 2018 at the end of the campaign. He was completely ostracised by the latter's new coach Marcelino García Toral, and on 1 December 2017 he moved to SD Eibar also of the Spanish top flight on loan until the following 30 June. In April 2018, immediately after the Basque side confirmed their survival, a permanent €2 million contract was agreed after the pertinent clause was triggered; he scored eight goals in 2019–20 and also provided more assists than anyone in the squad, as they again managed to stay afloat.

On 20 July 2020, Real Valladolid announced Orellana had joined them on a two-year deal. On 30 August 2021, however, after being relegated, he terminated his contract with the club.

After leaving Club Deportivo Universidad Católica in his homeland, Orellana returned to Spain in 2023 with xBuyer Team in the Kings League.

== International career ==
Orellana made his debut for Chile in 2008. On 15 October of the same year he scored his first international goal, in a 2010 FIFA World Cup qualifier against Argentina in Santiago (1–0 win).

On 10 October 2009, for the same competition, Orellana closed the scoring in a 4–2 win in Colombia, securing the national team's qualification to the World Cup after 12 years. In the final stages in South Africa, he came on as a substitute for Alexis Sánchez midway through the second half of a 2–1 group stage defeat against eventual champions Spain.

Orellana played in the 2008 Toulon Tournament with the under-20s, helping them to the second position.

=== International goals ===
Scores and results list Chile's goal tally first, score column indicates score after each Orellana goal.

List of international goals scored by Fabián Orellana
No.	Date	Venue	Opponent	Score	Result	Competition
1	15 October 2008	Estadio Nacional, Santiago, Chile	Argentina	1–0	1–0	2010 FIFA World Cup qualification
2	10 October 2009	Atanasio Girardot, Medellín, Colombia	Colombia	2–4	2–4	2010 FIFA World Cup qualification

== Post-retirement ==
In December 2024, Orellana graduated as a football manager at INAF (National Institute of Football, Sports and Physical Activity of Chile).

== Personal life ==
Orellana's nickname, El Poeta (The poet), came from his resemblance to a Chilean comedy character who had the same name. After his goal against Argentina, he also began being referred to as El Histórico (The historic one).

== Honours ==
Universidad Católica

- Chilean Primera División: 2021

Chile

- Copa América: 2016
