= 2016–17 Deportivo de La Coruña season =

Deportivo La Coruña
2016–17 season
- Chairman: Tino Fernández
- Manager: Gaizka Garitano
- Stadium: Riazor
- La Liga: 16th
- Copa del Rey: Round of 16
- Top goalscorer: Florin Andone (12)
- Highest home attendance: 30,810
- Lowest home attendance: 18,466
- Average home league attendance: 22,372
Home colours	Away colours	Third colours

The 2016–17 Deportivo de La Coruña season was the club's 110th in its history and its 45th in La Liga, the top-tier of Spanish football. In addition to the domestic league, the club also competed in the 2016–17 Copa del Rey.

== Squad ==
=== Current squad ===
As of 31 August 2016

Note: Flags indicate national team as defined under FIFA eligibility rules; some limited exceptions apply. Players may hold more than one non-FIFA nationality.

No.	Pos.	Nation	Player
1	GK	ARG	Germán Lux
2	DF	ESP	Juanfran (on loan from Watford)
3	DF	ESP	Fernando Navarro
4	MF	ESP	Álex Bergantiños
5	MF	ESP	Pedro Mosquera
6	DF	ESP	Raúl Albentosa
7	FW	ESP	Joselu (on loan from Stoke City)
8	MF	TUR	Emre Çolak
9	FW	COL	Marlos Moreno (on loan from Manchester City)
10	FW	ROU	Florin Andone
11	MF	ESP	Carles Gil (on loan from Aston Villa)

No.	Pos.	Nation	Player
12	DF	BRA	Sidnei
13	GK	POL	Przemysław Tytoń
14	DF	ESP	Alejandro Arribas
15	DF	ESP	Laure
16	DF	POR	Luisinho
17	MF	ESP	Borja Valle
19	MF	MAR	Fayçal Fajr
20	MF	BRA	Guilherme (on loan from Udinese)
21	MF	POR	Bruno Gama
22	MF	CRC	Celso Borges
25	GK	ESP	Rubén

=== Out on loan ===
Note: Flags indicate national team as defined under FIFA eligibility rules; some limited exceptions apply. Players may hold more than one non-FIFA nationality.

No.	Pos.	Nation	Player
—	DF	ESP	Pablo Insua (on loan at Leganés until 30 June 2017)
—	DF	ESP	Róber (on loan at Levante until 30 June 2017)
—	DF	ESP	Saúl (on loan at Girona until 30 June 2017)

No.	Pos.	Nation	Player
—	MF	ESP	Juan Domínguez (on loan at Mallorca until 30 June 2017)
—	MF	ESP	Bicho (on loan at Racing Ferrol until 30 June 2017)
—	FW	ESP	Oriol Riera (on loan at Osasuna until 30 June 2017)

== Transfers ==
=== In ===
Date	Pos.	Name	From	Fee
1 July 2016	FW	(Spain) Borja Valle	(Spain) Oviedo	Free
1 July 2016	MF	(Turkey) Emre Çolak	(Turkey) Galatasaray	Free
1 July 2016	GK	(Poland) Przemysław Tytoń	(Germany) VfB Stuttgart	Undisclosed
3 July 2016	GK	(Spain) Rubén	(Spain) Levante	Undisclosed
6 July 2016	FW	(Portugal) Bruno Gama	(Ukraine) Dnipro Dnipropetrovsk	Undisclosed
9 July 2016	DF	(Spain) Raúl Albentosa	(England) Derby County	Undisclosed
26 July 2016	FW	(Romania) Florin Andone	(Spain) Córdoba	Undisclosed

=== Loan in ===
Date from	Date to	Pos.	Name	From
12 July 2016	30 June 2017	MF	(Spain) Juanfran	(England) Watford
18 July 2016	30 June 2017	MF	(Brazil) Guilherme	(Italy) Udinese
22 July 2016	30 June 2017	MF	(Spain) Carles Gil	(England) Aston Villa
6 August 2016	30 June 2017	FW	(Colombia) Marlos Moreno	(England) Manchester City
31 August 2016	30 June 2017	FW	(Spain) Joselu	(England) Stoke City

=== Out ===
Date	Pos.	Name	To	Fee
1 July 2016	GK	(Croatia) Stipe Pletikosa	Retired	N/A
6 July 2016	MF	(Spain) Cani	(Spain) Real Zaragoza	Free
9 July 2016	GK	(Spain) Fabri	(Turkey) Beşiktaş	Undisclosed
16 July 2016	GK	(Spain) Manuel Fernández	(Iran) Machine Sazi	Undisclosed
21 July 2016	FW	(Spain) Luis Fernández	(Spain) Alcorcón	Free
27 August 2016	FW	(Spain) Lucas Pérez	(England) Arsenal	£17,100,000

=== Loan out ===
Date from	Date to	Pos.	Name	To
1 July 2016	30 June 2017	MF	(Spain) Juan Domínguez	(Spain) Mallorca
6 July 2016	30 June 2017	DF	(Spain) Róber	(Spain) Levante
26 July 2016	30 June 2017	MF	(Spain) Bicho	(Spain) Racing Ferrol
12 August 2016	30 June 2017	FW	(Spain) Oriol Riera	(Spain) Osasuna
13 August 2016	30 June 2017	FW	(Spain) Saúl	(Spain) Girona

== Pre-season and friendlies ==
16 July Garcia Calvo Memorial	Negreira	1–10	Deportivo La Coruña	Negreira, Spain
19:00 GMT	Puga 5'	Report	Borges 12'; Fernández 17', 43'; Pérez 48', 56', 89'; Riera 52', 74', 78'; Gama 86'	Stadium: Estadio Jesús García Calvo; Referee: Julio José Martínez Barral (Spain)

21 July Montevideo Tournament	Celta Vigo	2–0	Deportivo La Coruña	Montevideo, Uruguay
21:30 GMT	Aspas 68'; Radoja 90'	Report		Stadium: Estadio Centenario; Referee: Daniel Fedorczuk (Uruguay)

23 July Montevideo Tournament	Peñarol	2–2 (7–8 p)	Deportivo La Coruña	Montevideo, Uruguay
19:00 GMT	Novick 84', 88' (pen.)	Report	Guilherme 46'; Valle 78'	Stadium: Estadio Centenario; Referee: Esteban Ostojich (Uruguay)
	Penalties
	Penalty scored Penalty missed		Penalty scored

29 July Concepción Arenal Trophy	Racing Ferrol	0–2	Deportivo La Coruña	Ferrol, Spain
19:30 GMT		Report	Gil 17'; Riera 33'	Stadium: Estadio Municipal da Malata; Referee: Corral Garcia (Spain)

30 July Emma Cuervo Trophy	Real Oviedo	0–2	Deportivo La Coruña	Lugo, Spain
18:00 GMT		Report	Valle 55'; Navarro 80'	Stadium: Estadio Municipal Pepe Barrera; Referee: Brea Peón (Spain)

3 August Verín International Trophy	Verín	0–3	Deportivo La Coruña	Verín, Spain
19:00 GMT		Report; 45 minute match	Monsalve 7'; Riera 11'; Borges 45'	Stadium: Campo de Fútbol Xosé Argiz

3 August Verín International Trophy	Deportivo La Coruña	0–1	Chaves	Verín, Spain
19:00 GMT		Report; 45 minute match	Braga 18'	Stadium: Campo de Fútbol Xosé Argiz

6 August Trofeo de Santa María	Feirense	0–1	Deportivo La Coruña	Santa Maria da Feira, Portugal
20:00 GMT		Report	Pérez 54'	Stadium: Estádio Marcolino de Castro; Referee: Renato Oliveira (Portugal)

9 August Teresa Herrera Trophy	Deportivo La Coruña	2–0	Villarreal	A Coruña, Spain
19:30 GMT	Andone 8'; Gil 90+2'	Report		Stadium: Estadio Riazor; Attendance: 18,000; Referee: Ignacio Iglesias Villanueva (Spain)

13 August Villa de Gijón Trophy	Sporting Gijón	1–1 (4–2 p)	Deportivo La Coruña	Gijón, Spain
19:30 GMT	Čop 18'	Report	Gama 81'	Stadium: El Molinón; Attendance: 13,500; Referee: José González González (Spain)
	Penalties
	López (penalty scored); Gómez (penalty scored); Carmona (penalty scored); Pérez (penalty scored)		(penalty missed) Andone; (penalty scored) Guilherme; (penalty scored) Çolak; (penalty missed) Gama

== Competitions ==
=== La Liga ===
==== League table ====
Pos	Team	Pld	W	D	L	GF	GA	GD	Pts	Qualification or relegation
14	Las Palmas	38	10	9	19	53	74	−21	39 (Note: Las Palmas ahead of Real Betis on head-to-head goal difference: Las Palmas–Real Betis 4–1, Real Betis–Las Palmas 2–0)	
15	Real Betis	38	10	9	19	41	64	−23	39	
16	Deportivo La Coruña	38	8	12	18	43	61	−18	36	
17	Leganés	38	8	11	19	36	55	−19	35	
18	Sporting Gijón (R)	38	7	10	21	42	72	−30	31	Relegation to Segunda División

Source: La Liga, Soccerway
Rules for classification: 1) Points; 2) Head-to-head points; 3) Head-to-head goal difference; 4) Goal difference; 5) Goals scored; 6) Fair-play points; 7) Play-off.
(R) Relegated

==== Result round by round ====
Round	1	2	3	4	5	6	7	8	9	10	11	12	13	14	15	16	17	18	19	20	21	22	23	24	25	26	27	28	29	30	31	32	33	34	35	36	37	38
Ground	H	A	H	A	H	A	H	A	A	H	A	H	A	H	A	H	A	H	A	A	H	A	H	A	H	A	H	H	A	H	A	H	A	H	A	H	A	H
Result	W	D	L	D	L	L	W	L	L	D	D	L	L	W	L	W	D	D	D	L	D	L	L	L	D	W	W	L	L	D	L	W	L	L	D	L	D	W
Position	5	5	10	11	13	16	13	15	17	17	16	17	17	16	16	15	15	15	16	16	16	16	16	16	15	15	15	16	16	16	16	16	16	16	16	17	17	16

Updated to match(es) played on 20 May 2017. Source: Soccerway
A = Away; H = Home; W = Win; D = Draw; L = Loss

==== Matches ====
Win Draw Loss

19 August 2016 1	Deportivo La Coruña	2–1	Eibar	A Coruña
21:00 CEST	Navarro (yellow card) 61'; Gama (yellow card) 64'; Mosquera 69'; Pérez 87' (pen.); Albentosa (yellow card) 90'	Report	Ramis 54'; García (yellow card) 68'; Juncà (yellow card) 86'; Kike (yellow card) 90'	Stadium: Riazor; Attendance: 22,374; Referee: Mario Melero López

26 August 2016 2	Real Betis	0–0	Deportivo La Coruña	Seville
19:45 CEST		Report	Juanfran (yellow card) 65'; Mosquera (yellow card) 90+3'	Stadium: Benito Villamarín; Attendance: 34,543; Referee: Carlos Clos Gómez

11 September 2016 3	Deportivo La Coruña	0–1	Athletic Bilbao	A Coruña
20:30 CEST	Borges (yellow card) 70'; Albentosa (yellow card) 90'	Report	García (yellow card) 19', (goal) 41'; San José (yellow card) 67'; Beñat (yellow card) 71'	Stadium: Riazor; Attendance: 22,317; Referee: Javier Estrada Fernández

19 September 2016 4	Alavés	0–0	Deportivo La Coruña	Vitoria-Gasteiz
20:45 CEST	Alexis (yellow card) 8'; Deyverson (yellow card) 57'; R. García (yellow card) 79'	Report	Gama (yellow card) 24'; Arribas (yellow card) 67'; Albentosa (yellow card) 75'; Andone (yellow card) 88'	Stadium: Mendizorrotza; Attendance: 14,637; Referee: Juan Martínez Munuera

22 September 2016 5	Deportivo La Coruña	1–2	Leganés	A Coruña
20:00 CEST	Borges 31'	Report	Luciano (yellow card) 17', (goal) 55'; Pérez (yellow card) 59'; Gabriel 61'	Stadium: Riazor; Referee: Alberto Undiano Mallenco

25 September 2016 6	Atlético Madrid	1–0	Deportivo La Coruña	Madrid
16:15 CEST	Hernandez (yellow card) 42'; Griezmann 70'	Report	Fajr (yellow card) 38' (yellow-red card) 45+2'; Çolak (yellow card) 55'; Babel (yellow card) 84'	Stadium: Vicente Calderón; Attendance: 45,653; Referee: Jesús Gil Manzano

1 October 2016 7	Deportivo La Coruña	2–1	Sporting Gijón	A Coruña
20:45 CEST	Borges 35'; Babel 90+2'	Report	Álvarez (yellow card) 43', (goal) 65'; Gómez (yellow card) 54'; Meré (yellow card) 59'; López (yellow card) 85'	Stadium: Riazor; Attendance: 23,957; Referee: Ricardo de Burgos Bengoetxea

16 October 2016 8	Barcelona	4–0	Deportivo La Coruña	Barcelona
16:15 CEST	Rafinha 21', 36'; L. Suárez 43'; Messi 58', (yellow card) 90'	Report	Mosquera (yellow card) 52'; Andone (yellow card) 59'; Laure (red card) 65'	Stadium: Camp Nou; Attendance: 83,553; Referee: José María Sánchez Martínez

23 October 2016 9	Celta Vigo	4–1	Deportivo La Coruña	Vigo
12:00 CEST	Roncaglia 32'; Mallo (yellow card) 41'; Aspas 60' (pen.), 83'; Hernández (yellow card) 68'; Orellana (yellow card) 71', (goal) 78'	Report	Albentosa (yellow card) 30', (goal) 37'; Guilherme (yellow card) 56'; Sidnei (yellow card) 59'; Lux (yellow card) 59'; Mosquera (yellow card) 75'	Stadium: Balaídos; Attendance: 21,024; Referee: Alfonso Álvarez Izquierdo

30 October 2016 10	Deportivo La Coruña	1–1	Valencia	A Coruña
20:45 CEST	Çolak 45+2'; Albentosa (yellow card) 60'	Report	Nani (yellow card) 34'; Mangala (yellow card) 54'; Rodrigo 56'; Garay (yellow card) 64'; Pérez (yellow card) 66'; Montoya (yellow card) 90+2'	Stadium: Riazor; Attendance: 23,492; Referee: José González González

5 November 2016 11	Granada	1–1	Deportivo La Coruña	Granada
13:00 CET	Saunier (yellow card) 22'; Tytoń 81' (o.g.)	Report	Borges (yellow card) 38'; Luisinho (yellow card) 38'; Andone (yellow card) 64'	Stadium: Los Cármenes; Attendance: 13,157; Referee: Alberto Undiano Mallenco

19 November 2016 12	Deportivo	2–3	Sevilla	A Coruña
13:00 CET	Babel 1', (yellow card) 90+4'; Andone 42'; Tytoń (yellow card) 57'; Arribas (yellow card) 84'	Report	Nzonzi 44'; Pareja (yellow card) 76'; Vietto (yellow card) 83'; Vitolo 89'; Mercado 90+2'	Stadium: Riazor; Attendance: 20,096; Referee: Antonio Mateu Lahoz

26 November 2016 13	Málaga	4–3	Deportivo La Coruña	A Coruña
13:00 CET	Santos 21' (pen.), 56'; Sandro 40'; Juanpi (yellow card) 76'; Camacho (yellow card) 78'; Ontiveros 90+2', (yellow card) 90+2'	Report	Borges 4' (pen.), 81'; Luisinho (yellow card) 10'; Andone 72'	Stadium: Riazor; Attendance: 12,679; Referee: Iñaki Vicandi Garrido

5 December 2016 14	Deportivo La Coruña	5–1	Real Sociedad	A Coruña
20:45 CET	Sidnei 13'; I. Martínez 29' (o.g.); Andone 42', 77'; Çolak (yellow card) 63'; Babel 64'	Report	Berchiche 57', (yellow card) 66'; I. Martínez (yellow card) 62'	Stadium: Riazor; Attendance: 20,548; Referee: José Luis Munuera Montero

10 December 2016 15	Real Madrid	3–2	Deportivo La Coruña	Madrid
20:45 CET	Morata 50', (yellow card) 70'; Mariano 84'; Navas (yellow card) 88'; Ramos (yellow card) 88', (goal) 90+2'	Report	Borges (yellow card) 25'; Babel (yellow card) 45'; Albentosa (yellow card) 59'; Joselu 63', 65'; Sidnei (yellow card) 88'	Stadium: Santiago Bernabéu; Attendance: 67,174; Referee: Santiago Jaime Latre

18 December 2016 16	Deportivo La Coruña	2–0	Osasuna	A Coruña
18:30 CET	Andone 10'; Babel 42'; Juanfran (yellow card) 66'	Report	De las Cuevas (yellow card) 52'; Márquez (yellow card) 73'; Clerc (yellow card) 79'	Stadium: Riazor; Attendance: 22,966; Referee: José María Sánchez Martínez

6 January 2017 17	Espanyol	1–1	Deportivo La Coruña	Barcelona
20:45 CET	Sevilla (yellow card) 27'; Gerard 63'	Report	Juanfran (yellow card) 17' (yellow-red card) 90'; Guilherme (yellow card) 24'; Borges 59'	Stadium: Cornellà-El Prat; Attendance: 16,347; Referee: Ricardo de Burgos Bengoetxea

14 January 2017 18	Deportivo La Coruña	0–0	Villarreal	A Coruña
20:45 CET		Report	Trigueros (yellow card) 79'	Stadium: Riazor; Attendance: 19,807; Referee: Daniel Ocón Arráiz

20 January 2017 19	Las Palmas	1–1	Deportivo La Coruña	Las Palmas
20:45 CET	M. García 13'; Aythami (yellow card) 72' (yellow-red card) 77'	Report	Andone 69'; Joselu (yellow card) 90+1'	Stadium: Gran Canaria; Attendance: 18,051; Referee: David Fernández Borbalán

28 January 2017 20	Eibar	3–1	Deportivo La Coruña	Eibar
18:30 CET	Adrián 4'; Enrich 15'; Lejeune 72'	Report	Çolak 19'; Borges (yellow card) 29'; Gil (yellow card) 51'	Stadium: Ipurua; Attendance: 5,617; Referee: Juan Martínez Munuera

11 February 2017 21	Athletic Club	2–1	Deportivo La Coruña	Bilbao
18:30 CET	San José (yellow card) 62'; Muniain 71'; Aduriz 89'	Report	Çolak 42'; Navarro (yellow card) 58'; Joselu (yellow card) 88'	Stadium: San Mamés; Attendance: 41,469; Referee: Mario Melero López

18 February 2017 22	Deportivo La Coruña	0–1	Alavés	A Coruña
18:30 CET	Guilherme (yellow card) 33'; Albentosa (yellow card) 67'; Gama (yellow card) 80'; Lux (yellow card) 86'; Gil (yellow card) 90+5'	Report	Llorente (yellow card) 42'; Deyverson (yellow card) 51'; M. García 68' (pen.); Sobrino (yellow card) 90+3'	Stadium: Riazor; Attendance: 19,753; Referee: Santiago Jaime Latre

25 February 2017 23	Leganés	4–0	Deportivo La Coruña	Leganés
18:30 CET	Szymanowski 19'; Mantovani 30'; Morán (yellow card) 66'; Guerrero (yellow card) 69'; López 81'; Bueno 90+1'	Report	Albentosa (red card) 62'; Lux (yellow card) 63'; Andone (yellow card) 69'; Guilherme (yellow card) 75'; Navarro (yellow card) 78'; Joselu (yellow card) 90'	Stadium: Butarque; Attendance: 9,524; Referee: José Luis Munuera Montero

2 March 2017 24	Deportivo La Coruña	1–1	Atlético Madrid	A Coruña
20:45 CET	Andone 13', (yellow card) 14'; Luisinho (yellow card) 45'; Bergantiños (yellow card) 88'	Report	Griezmann 68'; Godín (yellow card) 74'	Stadium: Riazor; Attendance: 20,138; Referee: Carlos Clos Gómez

5 March 2017 25	Sporting de Gijón	0–1	Deportivo La Coruña	Gijón
12:00 CET	Douglas (yellow card) 45'; Meré (yellow card) 72'; Canella (yellow card) 88'	Report	Mosquera 45', (yellow card) 59'; Navarro (yellow card) 45'; Arribas (yellow card) 53'; Gil (yellow card) 88'; Luisinho (yellow card) 88'	Stadium: El Molinón; Attendance: 23,586; Referee: Antonio Mateu Lahoz

8 March 2017 26	Deportivo La Coruña	1–1	Real Betis	A Coruña
18:45 CET	Gil (yellow card) 21'; Andone (yellow card) 33'; Mosquera (yellow card) 86'; Borges 90+3' (pen.); Albentosa (yellow card) 90+4'	Report	Donk (yellow card) 35'; Pardo (yellow card) 40'; Ceballos (yellow card) 52'; Piccini 70'; Adán (yellow card) 90'; Pezzella (yellow card) 90+1'; Mandi (yellow card) 90+2'; Martínez (yellow card) 90+5'	Stadium: Riazor; Attendance: 21,450; Referee: Alfonso Álvarez Izquierdo
Note: Match originally scheduled for 3 February 2017

12 March 2017 27	Deportivo de La Coruña	2–1	Barcelona	A Coruña
16:15 CET	Navarro (yellow card) 14'; Joselu (yellow card) 36', (goal) 40'; Bergantiños 74'	Report	L. Suárez 46'	Stadium: Riazor; Attendance: 28,474; Referee: David Fernández Borbalán

19 March 2017 28	Deportivo La Coruña	0–1	Celta de Vigo	A Coruña
18:30 CET	Luisinho (yellow card) 56'; Lux (yellow card) 75'; Mosquera (yellow card) 80'; Çolak (yellow card) 90+3'	Report	Cabral (yellow card) 14'; Mallo (yellow card) 65'; Aspas 74'; Hernández (yellow card) 83'; Sisto (yellow card) 86'	Stadium: Riazor; Attendance: 30,810; Referee: Juan Martínez Munuera

2 April 2017 29	Valencia	3–0	Deportivo La Coruña	Valencia
18:30 CEST	Montoya (yellow card) 7'; Garay 10'; Albentosa 29' (o.g.); Abdennour (yellow card) 50'; Pérez (yellow card) 55'; Cancelo 90+1'	Report	Joselu (yellow card) 16'	Stadium: Mestalla; Attendance: 34,724; Referee: Ricardo de Burgos Bengoetxea

5 April 2017 30	Deportivo La Coruña	0–0	Granada	A Coruña
20:30 CEST	John (yellow card) 90+2'	Report	Héctor (yellow card) 45'; Estupiñán (yellow card) 75'; Pereira (yellow card) 76'; Cuenca (yellow card) 90+1'	Stadium: Riazor; Attendance: 19,303; Referee: Carlos del Cerro Grande

8 April 2017 31	Sevilla	4–2	Deportivo La Coruña	Seville
18:30 CEST	Jovetić 1', (yellow card) 67'; Sarabia 9'; Escudero (yellow card) 27'; Correa 32'; Kranevitter (yellow card) 45'; Ben Yedder 88'	Report	Kakuta 4'; Luisinho (yellow card) 26'; Arribas (yellow card) 60'; Joselu (yellow card) 87'	Stadium: Ramón Sánchez Pizjuán; Attendance: 33,099; Referee: Santiago Jaime Latre

15 April 2017 32	Deportivo La Coruña	2–0	Málaga	A Coruña
13:00 CEST	Guilherme (yellow card) 22'; Joselu 47'; Mosquera (yellow card) 67'; Arribas (yellow card) 72'; Gil (yellow card) 90+1'	Report	Recio (yellow card) 23'; Hernández (yellow card) 24'; Keko (yellow card) 73'; Camacho (yellow card) 84'	Stadium: Riazor; Attendance: 20,300; Referee: Alberto Undiano Mallenco

23 April 2017 33	Real Sociedad	1–0	Deportivo La Coruña	San Sebastián
12:00 CEST	Willian José 28'; Navas (yellow card) 45'	Report	Albentosa (yellow card) 44'; Fajr (yellow card) 50'; Bergantiños (yellow card) 70'	Stadium: Anoeta; Attendance: 19,851; Referee: Daniel Ocón Arráiz

26 April 2017 34	Deportivo La Coruña	2–6	Real Madrid	A Coruña
21:30 CEST	Andone 35'; Arribas (yellow card) 67'; Joselu 84', (yellow card) 90+2'; Çolak (yellow card) 90+3'	Report	Morata 1'; Rodríguez 14', 66'; Vázquez 44'; Isco (yellow card) 68', (goal) 77'; Casemiro 87'	Stadium: Riazor; Attendance: 26,788; Referee: José María Sánchez Martínez

30 April 2017 35	Osasuna	2–2	Deportivo La Coruña	Pamplona
12:00 CEST	Mondragón 4'; Buñuel (yellow card) 13'; Oier (yellow card) 17'; Juanfran 78' (o.g.)	Report	Guilherme (yellow card) 2', (goal) 18', 70'; Albentosa (yellow card) 75'; Arribas (yellow card) 90+2'	Stadium: El Sadar; Attendance: 12,294; Referee: Alejandro Hernández Hernández

7 May 2017 36	Deportivo La Coruña	1–2	Espanyol	A Coruña
18:30 CEST	Andone 47'; Gil (yellow card) 60'	Report	Baptistão 14'; Gerard 29'; Piatti (yellow card) 78'; Sánchez (yellow card) 81'	Stadium: Riazor; Attendance: 22,803; Referee: Antonio Mateu Lahoz

14 May 2017 37	Villarreal	0–0	Deportivo La Coruña	Villarreal
20:00 CEST	Trigueros (yellow card) 43'; Soldado (yellow card) 45+1'	Report	Lux (yellow card) 45+1'; Andone (yellow card) 53'; Fajr (yellow card) 64'; Borges (yellow card) 90+4'	Stadium: La Cerámica; Attendance: 16,437; Referee: Jesús Gil Manzano

20 May 2017 38	Deportivo La Coruña	3–0	Las Palmas	A Coruña
19:00 CEST	Andone 4', 28'; Navarro (yellow card) 25'; Gil 39', (yellow card) 44'; Mosquera (yellow card) 48'; Çolak (yellow card) 54'	Summary	Mesa (yellow card) 38'; Hernán (yellow card) 51' (yellow-red card) 79'; Momo (yellow card) 54'	Stadium: Riazor; Attendance: 21,764; Referee: Mario Melero López
