= 2016–17 Celta de Vigo season =

Celta de Vigo
2016–17 season
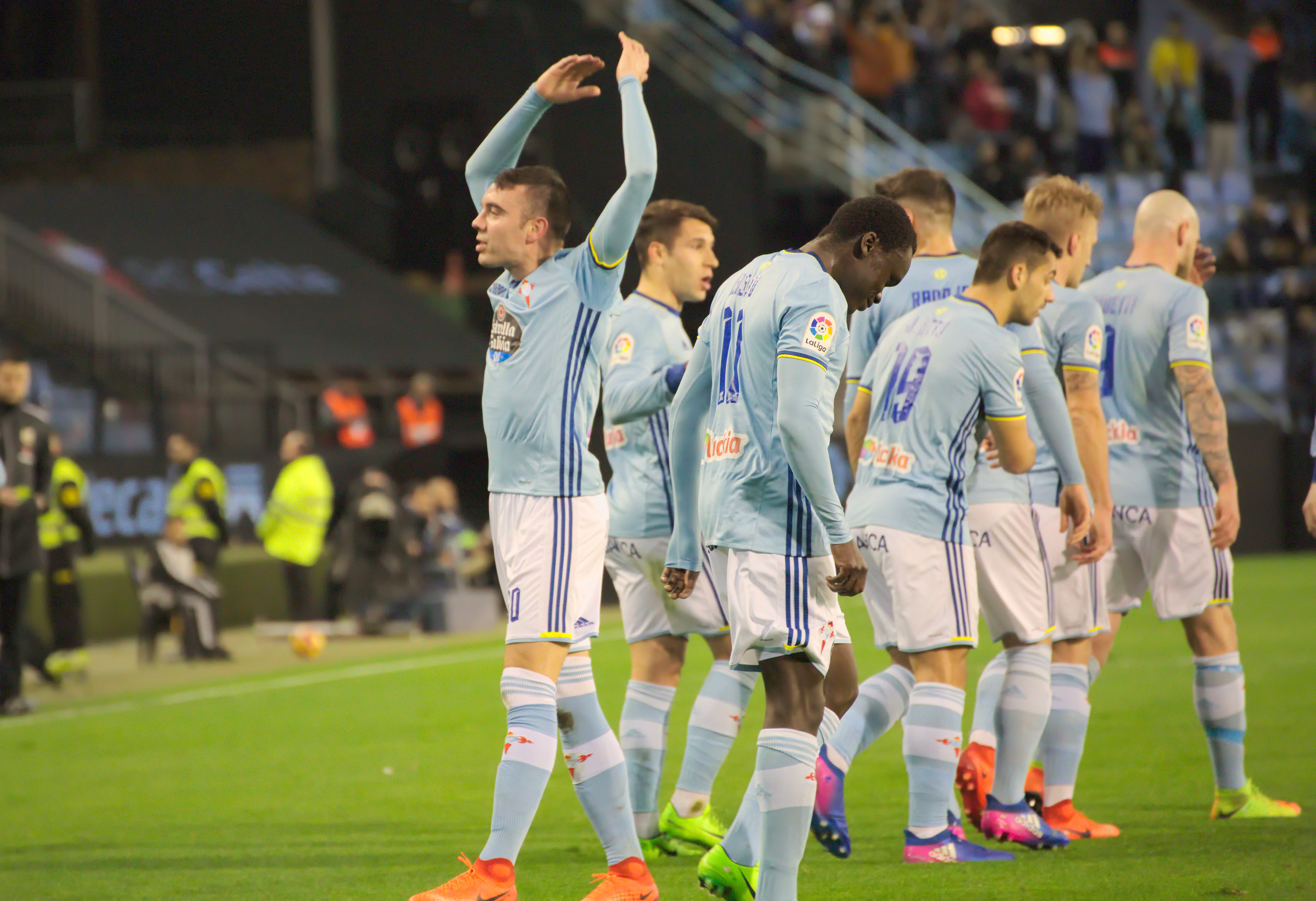
- President: Carlos Mouriño
- Head coach: Eduardo Berizzo
- Stadium: Balaídos
- La Liga: 13th
- Copa del Rey: Semi-finals
- UEFA Europa League: Semi-finals
- Top goalscorer: League: Iago Aspas (19); All: Iago Aspas (26)
- Highest home attendance: 26,202 vs Manchester United (4 May 2017)
- Lowest home attendance: 9,161 vs UCAM Murcia (22 December 2016)
Home colours	Away colours	Third colours

The 2016–17 Celta de Vigo season was the club's 93rd season in its history and its 51st participating in La Liga, the top-flight of Spanish football.

== Squad ==
=== First team squad ===
As of 2 September 2016.

Note: Flags indicate national team as defined under FIFA eligibility rules; some limited exceptions apply. Players may hold more than one non-FIFA nationality.

No.	Pos.	Nation	Player
1	GK	ESP	Sergio (3rd captain)
2	DF	ESP	Hugo Mallo (captain)
3	DF	ESP	Andreu Fontàs (4th captain)
4	DF	ESP	Pape Cheikh Diop
5	MF	CHI	Marcelo Díaz
6	MF	SRB	Nemanja Radoja
7	FW	BEL	Théo Bongonda
8	MF	CHI	Pablo Hernández
9	FW	SWE	John Guidetti
10	FW	ESP	Iago Aspas
11	MF	DEN	Pione Sisto
12	FW	GLP	Claudio Beauvue
13	GK	ESP	Rubén Blanco

No.	Pos.	Nation	Player
15	MF	ESP	Álvaro Lemos
16	MF	ESP	Jozabed (on loan from Fulham)
17	MF	DEN	Andrew Hjulsager
18	MF	DEN	Daniel Wass
19	DF	ESP	Jonny
20	DF	ESP	Sergi Gómez
21	DF	ESP	Carles Planas
22	DF	ARG	Gustavo Cabral (vice-captain)
23	MF	ESP	Josep Señé
24	DF	ARG	Facundo Roncaglia
25	FW	ITA	Giuseppe Rossi (on loan from Fiorentina)

=== Out on loan ===
Note: Flags indicate national team as defined under FIFA eligibility rules; some limited exceptions apply. Players may hold more than one non-FIFA nationality.

No.	Pos.	Nation	Player
—	MF	SRB	Dejan Dražić (on loan at Valladolid)
—	MF	GAB	Lévy Madinda (on loan at Gimnàstic)

No.	Pos.	Nation	Player
—	MF	ESP	Álex López (on loan at Valladolid)
—	FW	ESP	Pedro Martín (on loan at Mirandés)

== Transfers ==
=== In ===
Date	Pos.	Name	From	Fee
17 June 2016	FW	(Spain) Naranjo	(Spain) Gimnàstic	Undisclosed
6 July 2016	DF	(Spain) Álvaro Lemos	(Spain) Lugo	Undisclosed
17 July 2016	DF	(Argentina) Facundo Roncaglia	(Italy) Fiorentina	Undisclosed
1 August 2016	FW	(Denmark) Pione Sisto	(Denmark) Midtjylland	Undisclosed

=== Out ===
Date	Pos.	Name	To	Fee
1 July 2016	FW	(Spain) Borja Domínguez	(Spain) Córdoba	Free
1 July 2016	FW	(Spain) Nolito	(England) Manchester City	Undisclosed
13 July 2016	FW	(Spain) Yelko Pino	(Spain) Lugo	Free

=== Loan out ===
Date from	Date to	Pos.	Name	To
27 July 2016	30 June 2017	MF	(Spain) Álex López	(Spain) Valladolid

== Pre-season and friendlies ==
16 July 2016 Friendly	Celta Vigo (Spain)	1–2	(Spain) Lugo	Vigo, Spain
19:00 GMT	Méndez 6'	Report	Miquel 61'; Pita 84'	Stadium: Municipal de Barreiro; Referee: Rubén Extremadura (Spain)

21 July 2016 Montevideo Tournament	Celta Vigo (Spain)	2–0	(Spain) Deportivo La Coruña	Montevideo, Uruguay
21:30 GMT	Aspas 68'; Radoja 90'	Report		Stadium: Estadio Centenario; Referee: Daniel Fedorczuk (Uruguay)

24 July 2016 Montevideo Tournament	Nacional (Uruguay)	2–0	(Spain) Celta Vigo	Montevideo, Uruguay
21:30 GMT	Fernández 22'; Barcia 32'	Report		Stadium: Estadio Centenario; Referee: Leodán González (Uruguay)

28 July 2016 Trofeo Ciudad de Melgaço	Celta Vigo (Spain)	2–1	(Spain) Real Valladolid	Melgaço, Portugal
18:00 GMT	Bongonda 50'; Señé 72'	Report	Mata 12'	Stadium: Centro de Estágios de Melgaço; Attendance: 3,000; Referee: Fabio Nunes (Portugal)

31 July 2016 Friendly	Fiorentina (Italy)	0–1	(Spain) Celta Vigo	Florence, Italy
20:00 GMT		Report	Bongonda 23'	Stadium: Stadio Artemio Franchi; Referee: Gianluca Manganiello (Italy)

6 August 2016 Friendly	Pescara (Italy)	1–2	(Spain) Celta Vigo	Castel di Sangro, Italy
20:00 GMT		Report		Stadium: Stadio Teofilo Patini

14 August 2016 Main Finance Cup	Eintracht Frankfurt (Germany)	3–1	(Spain) Celta Vigo	Frankfurt, Germany
20:00 GMT	Castaignos 6'; Mascarell 15'; Aigner 38'	Report	Alégué 43'	Stadium: Commerzbank-Arena; Attendance: 5,026

== Competitions ==
=== La Liga ===
==== League table ====
Pos	Team	Pld	W	D	L	GF	GA	GD	Pts
11	Málaga	38	12	10	16	49	55	−6	46 (Note: Málaga ahead of Valencia on head-to-head points: Valencia–Málaga 2–2, Málaga–Valencia 2–0)
12	Valencia	38	13	7	18	56	65	−9	46
13	Celta Vigo	38	13	6	19	53	69	−16	45
14	Las Palmas	38	10	9	19	53	74	−21	39 (Note: Las Palmas ahead of Real Betis on head-to-head goal difference: Las Palmas–Real Betis 4–1, Real Betis–Las Palmas 2–0)
15	Real Betis	38	10	9	19	41	64	−23	39

Source: La Liga, Soccerway
Rules for classification: 1) Points; 2) Head-to-head points; 3) Head-to-head goal difference; 4) Goal difference; 5) Goals scored; 6) Fair-play points; 7) Play-off.

==== Result round by round ====
Round	1	2	3	4	5	6	7	8	9	10	11	12	13	14	15	16	17	18	19	20	21	22	23	24	25	26	27	28	29	30	31	32	33	34	35	36	37	38
Ground	H	A	H	A	H	A	H	A	H	A	H	A	H	A	H	A	H	H	A	A	H	A	H	A	H	A	H	A	H	A	H	A	H	A	H	A	A	H
Result	L	L	L	D	W	W	W	L	W	D	W	L	W	D	L	L	W	W	L	W	L	L	W	D	D	L	L	W	W	L	L	W	L	L	L	L	L	D
Position	16	19	20	19	17	12	10	12	8	9	8	9	9	9	12	13	9	8	8	8	10	10	9	10	10	10	11	11	10	10	10	10	10	11	11	12	13	13

Updated to match(es) played on 21 May 2017. Source: Soccerway
A = Away; H = Home; W = Win; D = Draw; L = Loss

==== Matches ====
Win Draw Loss

22 August 2016 1	Celta Vigo	0–1	Leganés	Vigo
19:00 CEST	Roncaglia (yellow card) 15'; Mallo (yellow card) 67'; Hernández (yellow card) 88'; Aspas (yellow card) 89'	Report	Marín (yellow card) 60'; Díaz 75'; Timor (red card) 90'	Stadium: Balaídos; Attendance: 16,578; Referee: José Luis Munuera Montero

27 August 2016 2	Real Madrid	2–1	Celta Vigo	Madrid
20:15 CEST	Morata 60'; Kroos 81'	Report	Mallo (yellow card) 52'; Jonny (yellow card) 55'; Orellana 67'	Stadium: Santiago Bernabéu; Attendance: 61,568; Referee: Ricardo de Burgos Bengoetxea

10 September 2016 3	Celta Vigo	0–4	Atlético Madrid	Vigo
13:00 CEST	Señé (yellow card) 44'	Report	Gabi (yellow card) 26'; Koke 53'; Correa (yellow card) 70', (goal) 89'; Griezmann 73', 81'	Stadium: Balaídos; Attendance: 18,100; Referee: Santiago Jaime Latre

18 September 2016 4	Osasuna	0–0	Celta Vigo	Pamplona
12:00 CEST	Oier (yellow card) 27'; García (yellow card) 32'; Mérida (yellow card) 36'; Torres (yellow card) 64'	Report	Guidetti (yellow card) 43'	Stadium: El Sadar; Attendance: 14,854; Referee: Daniel Trujillo Suárez

21 September 2016 5	Celta Vigo	2–1	Sporting Gijón	Vigo
20:00	Hugo Mallo 66'; Radoja (yellow card) 77'; Roncaglia (yellow card) 79'; Aspas 87' (pen.)	Report	Amorebieta (yellow card) 33'; Viguera (yellow card) 67'; Čop 80' (pen.); Cases (yellow card) 86'	Stadium: Balaídos; Attendance: 14,863; Referee: Mario Melero López

25 September 2016 6	Espanyol	0–2	Celta Vigo	Cornellà de Llobregat
20:45 CEST	Roca (yellow card) 43'; Ó. Duarte (yellow card) 87'	Report	Roncaglia (yellow card) 29'; Aspas (yellow card) 75'; Hernández (yellow card) 86'; Rossi 90+1'; Sisto 90+3'	Stadium: Estadi Cornellà-El Prat; Attendance: 16,656; Referee: Alberto Undiano Mallenco

2 October 2016 7	Celta Vigo	4–3	Barcelona	Vigo
20:45 CEST	Sisto 22'; Aspas 31'; Mathieu 33' (o.g.); Hernández 77'	Report	Busquets (yellow card) 45'; Piqué 58', 87', (yellow card) 74'; Neymar 64' (pen.); L. Suárez (yellow card) 88'	Stadium: Balaídos; Attendance: 20,034; Referee: Iñaki Vicandi Garrido

16 October 2016 8	Villarreal	5–0	Celta Vigo	Vilarreal
20:45 CEST	Soriano 8', 12'; Bakambu 38'; Wass 48' (o.g.); Álvaro (yellow card) 56'; Trigueros 90+2'	Report	Gómez (yellow card) 13' (yellow-red card) 87'; Aspas (yellow card) 20'; Orellana (yellow card) 51'; Cheikh (yellow card) 54'; Wass (yellow card) 62'	Stadium: El Madrigal; Attendance: 18,152; Referee: Xavier Estrada Fernández

23 October 2016 9	Celta Vigo	4–1	Deportivo La Coruña	Vigo
12:00 CEST	Roncaglia 32'; Mallo (yellow card) 41'; Aspas 60' (pen.), 83'; Hernández (yellow card) 68'; Orellana (yellow card) 71', (goal) 78'	Report	Albentosa (yellow card) 30', (goal) 37'; Guilherme (yellow card) 56'; Sidnei (yellow card) 59'; Lux (yellow card) 59'; Mosquera (yellow card) 75'	Stadium: Balaídos; Attendance: 21,024; Referee: Alfonso Álvarez Izquierdo

30 October 2016 10	Las Palmas	3–3	Celta Vigo	Las Palmas
20:45 CEST	Boateng (yellow card) 50', (goal) 68'; Bigas 52'; Viera 66' (pen.); Momo (yellow card) 88'	Report	Wass 6', (yellow card) 74'; Mallo (yellow card) 11'; Aspas 14', 21', (yellow card) 43'; Radoja (yellow card) 27'; Gómez (yellow card) 40' (yellow-red card) 65'; Hernández (yellow card) 60'; Díaz (yellow card) 90'	Stadium: Estadio Gran Canaria; Attendance: 21,194; Referee: Mario Melero López

6 November 2016 11	Celta Vigo	2–1	Valencia	Vigo
16:15 CET	Guidetti (yellow card) 22', (goal) 77'; Costas (yellow card) 32'; Jonny (yellow card) 32'; Roncaglia 43'; Aspas (yellow card) 76'; Fontàs (yellow card) 86'; Blanco (yellow card) 90'	Report	Parejo 32' (pen.); Suárez (yellow card) 59'	Stadium: Balaídos; Attendance: 18,251; Referee: Carlos Clos Gómez

19 November 2016 12	Eibar	1–0	Celta Vigo	Vigo
18:30 CET	Rico 9'; Peña (yellow card) 75'; Ramis (yellow card) 79'	Report	Bongoda (yellow card) 30'; Roncaglia (yellow card) 86'; Blanco (yellow card) 86'; Sergio (red card) 90'; Hernández (yellow card) 90+2'; Mallo (yellow card) 90+4' (yellow-red card) 90+4'; Guidetti (yellow card) 90+4'	Stadium: Balaídos; Attendance: 5,503; Referee: José Luis Munuera Montero

27 November 2016 13	Celta Vigo	3–1	Granada	Vigo
18:30 CET	Aspas 23'; Bongonda 39'; Cheikh 90+3'	Report	Pereira (yellow card) 34'; Samper (yellow card) 41'; Tabanou (yellow card) 62'; Kravets 87'	Stadium: Balaídos; Attendance: 15,697; Referee: Daniel Trujillo Suárez

4 December 2016 14	Real Betis	3–3	Celta Vigo	Seville
12:00 CET	Donk (yellow card) 11'; Petros (yellow card) 25' (yellow-red card) 90+2'; Castro 41' (pen.); Sanabria 53', (yellow card) 59'; Pezzella 73', (yellow card) 89'; Gutiérrez (yellow card) 77'	Report	Aspas 15', 61'; Roncaglia 85'; Cabral (yellow card) 89'	Stadium: Benito Villamarín; Attendance: 27,241; Referee: José María Sánchez Martínez

11 December 2016 15	Celta Vigo	0–3	Sevilla	Vigo
16:15 CET	Aspas (yellow card) 41'; Hernández (yellow card) 79'; Guidetti (yellow card) 89'	Report	Mariano (yellow card) 48'; Iborra 51', 84', 90+2' (pen.); Vázquez (yellow card) 52'; Vitolo (yellow card) 55'	Stadium: Balaídos; Attendance: 19,350; Referee: Alberto Undiano Mallenco

19 December 2016 16	Athletic Bilbao	2–1	Celta Vigo	Bilbao
20:45	Vesga (yellow card) 10'; García (yellow card) 58'; Lekue (yellow card) 79'; Aduriz 82' (pen.); Yeray (yellow card) 86'; San José 90+3'	Report	Hernández (yellow card) 38'; Guidetti (yellow card) 41'; Aspas 54'; Roncaglia (yellow card) 56' (yellow-red card) 80'	Stadium: San Mamés; Attendance: 35,945; Referee: Juan Martínez Munuera

8 January 2017 17	Celta Vigo	3–1	Málaga	Vigo
18:30 CET	Aspas 7'; Was 60'; Fontàs 73'; Gómez (yellow card) 85'	Report	Fornals (yellow card) 29'; Recio (yellow card) 49'; Camacho (yellow card) 77'; Was 86' (o.g.); Juan Carlos (yellow card) 90'	Stadium: Balaídos; Attendance: 17,890; Referee: José González González

15 January 2017 18	Celta Vigo	1–0	Alavés	Vigo
16:15 CET	Cabral (yellow card) 11'; Wass (yellow card) 79'; Radoja 89'; Jonny (yellow card) 90+3'; Fontàs (yellow card) 90+4'	Report	Femenía (yellow card) 20'; Feddal (yellow card) 22' (yellow-red card) 46'; Édgar (yellow card) 66'; Hernandez (yellow card) 84'	Stadium: Balaídos; Attendance: 15,723; Referee: Mario Melero López

22 January 2017 19	Real Sociedad	1–0	Celta Vigo	San Sebastián
18:30 CET	Berchiche (yellow card) 66'; Juanmi 72', (yellow card) 86'	Report	Planas (yellow card) 28'; Rossi (yellow card) 79'	Stadium: Anoeta; Attendance: 19,845; Referee: Carlos del Cerro Grande

28 January 2017 20	Leganés	0–2	Celta Vigo	Leganés
20:45 CET	Gabriel (yellow card) 87'	Report	Lemos 32'; Fontàs (yellow card) 45+1'; Guidetti 66' (pen.)	Stadium: Butarque; Attendance: 10,123; Referee: Daniel Trujillo Suárez

12 February 2017 22	Atlético Madrid	3–2	Celta Vigo	Madrid
20:45 CET	Torres 11'; Carrasco 86'; Griezmann 88'; Gabi (yellow card) 90+1'	Report	Cabral 5'; Guidetti (yellow card) 42', (goal) 78'; Jonny (yellow card) 74'	Stadium: Vicente Calderón; Attendance: 30,323; Referee: Alejandro Hernández Hernández

19 February 2017 23	Celta Vigo	3–0	Osasuna	Vigo
18:30 CET	Sisto 23'; Jonny (yellow card) 80'; Jozabed 87'; Aspas 89'	Report		Stadium: Balaídos; Attendance: 15,556; Referee: Iñaki Vicandi Garrido

26 February 2017 24	Sporting Gijón	1–1	Celta Vigo	Gijón
18:30 CET	Gómez 49' (pen.); Amorebieta (yellow card) 58'; Meré (red card) 74'; Cuéllar (yellow card) 90+3'	Report	Fontàs (yellow card) 55'; Díaz (yellow card) 57'; Aspas 75'; Roncaglia (yellow card) 90+1'; Beauvue (yellow card) 90+3'	Stadium: El Molinón; Attendance: 23,797; Referee: Ricardo de Burgos Bengoetxea

1 March 2017 25	Celta Vigo	2–2	Espanyol	Vigo
21:30 CET	Aspas 21'; Guidetti (yellow card) 24'; Fontàs (yellow card) 26' (yellow-red card) 43'; Wass 30'; Díaz (yellow card) 68'	Report	Gerard 28', (yellow card) 78'; Piatti 32'; Pérez (yellow card) 70'	Stadium: Balaídos; Attendance: 11,526; Referee: Santiago Jaime Latre

4 March 2017 26	Barcelona	5–0	Celta Vigo	Barcelona
20:45 CET	Busquets (yellow card) 20'; Messi 24', 64'; Neymar 40'; Rakitić 57'; Umtiti 61'	Report	Cabral (yellow card) 36'; Radoja (yellow card) 38'; Gómez (yellow card) 49'	Stadium: Camp Nou; Attendance: 77,117; Referee: Jesús Gil Manzano

12 March 2017 27	Celta Vigo	0–1	Villarreal	Vigo
18:30 CET	Mallo (yellow card) 14'; Aspas (yellow card) 90'; Planas (yellow card) 90'; Bongonda (yellow card) 90+1'	Report	Soldado (yellow card) 8', (goal) 45'; Fernández (yellow card) 72'; Costa (yellow card) 73'; Dos Santos (yellow card) 85'; Musacchio (yellow card) 87'	Stadium: Balaídos; Attendance: 16,651; Referee: Mario Melero López

19 March 2017 28	Deportivo La Coruña	0–1	Celta Vigo	A Coruña
18:30 CET	Luisinho (yellow card) 56'; Lux (yellow card) 75'; Çolak (yellow card) 90+3'	Report	Cabral (yellow card) 14'; Mallo (yellow card) 65'; Aspas 74'; Hernández (yellow card) 83'; Sisto (yellow card) 86'	Stadium: Riazor; Attendance: 30,760; Referee: Juan Martínez Munuera

3 April 2017 29	Celta Vigo	3–1	Las Palmas	Vigo
20:45 CET	Rossi 12', 36', 57'; Roncaglia (yellow card) 24'; Jonny (yellow card) 45'; Cheikh (yellow card) 90+4'	Report	Bigas (yellow card) 17', (goal) 80'; Jesé (yellow card) 52'; Viera (yellow card) 90+4'	Stadium: Balaídos; Attendance: 14,212; Referee: Carlos Clos Gómez

6 April 2017 30	Valencia	3–2	Celta Vigo	Valencia
21:30 CET	Orellana (yellow card) 22'; Parejo 38'; Munir 67'; Soler 86'	Report	Cabral 16'; Bongonda (yellow card) 30'; Aspas 80' (pen.)	Stadium: Mestalla; Attendance: 29,212; Referee: David Fernández Borbalán

9 April 2017 31	Celta Vigo	0–2	Eibar	Vigo
16:15 CET	Jozabed (yellow card) 69'	Report	Kike 13'; Enrich (yellow card) 18'; Capa (yellow card) 40'; León 51'; Ramis (yellow card) 75'	Stadium: Balaídos; Attendance: 15,741; Referee: José Luis Munuera Montero

16 April 2017 32	Granada	0–3	Celta Vigo	Granada
20:45 CET	Ingason (yellow card) 37'; Wakaso (yellow card) 38'; Kravets (yellow card) 41'; Silva (yellow card) 81'; Ponce (yellow card) 88'	Report	Jozabed 23'; Díaz (yellow card) 58', (goal) 73'; Lemos (yellow card) 59'; Beauvue 76'	Stadium: Gran Canaria; Attendance: 13,442; Referee: José María Sánchez Martínez

23 April 2017 33	Celta Vigo	0–1	Real Betis	Vigo
16:15 CET	Planas (yellow card) 61'; Wass (yellow card) 79'; Díaz (yellow card) 81'	Report	Durmisi (yellow card) 27'; Brašanac 54'; Bruno (yellow card) 71'; Ceballos (yellow card) 80'; Navarro (yellow card) 86'; Cejudo (yellow card) 90+4'	Stadium: Balaídos; Attendance: 15,851; Referee: Ricardo de Burgos Bengoetxea

27 April 2017 34	Sevilla	2–1	Celta Vigo	Seville
20:30 CEST	Sarabia (yellow card) 27'; Correa 49'; Ben Yedder 79'	Report	Hernández (yellow card) 16' (yellow-red card) 56'; Mallo (yellow card) 38'; Aspas 53' (pen.); Cabral (yellow card) 61'	Stadium: Ramón Sánchez Pizjuán; Attendance: 25,995; Referee: Jesús Gil Manzano

30 April 2017 35	Celta Vigo	0–3	Athletic Bilbao	Vigo
20:45 CEST	Fontàs (yellow card) 61'	Report	García 35', 50'; Laporte (yellow card) 69'; Rico 83'	Stadium: Balaídos; Attendance: 17,320; Referee: David Fernández Borbalán

7 May 2017 36	Málaga	3–0	Celta Vigo	Málaga
20:45 CEST	Ontiveros 26'; Recio 56' (pen.), (yellow card) 81'; Camacho (yellow card) 81'; Sandro 90+2'	Report	Lemos (yellow card) 14'; Jozabed (yellow card) 30'; Guidetti (yellow card) 80'; Cheikh (yellow card) 89'	Stadium: La Rosaleda Stadium; Attendance: 20,552; Referee: Carlos del Cerro Grande

14 May 2017 37	Alavés	3–1	Celta Vigo	Vitoria-Gasteiz
16:00 CEST	M. García 5'; Feddal 18'; Deyverson 37'; Alexis (yellow card) 63'	Report	Aspas 78' (pen.), (yellow card) 81'; Fontàs (yellow card) 84'; Jonny (yellow card) 87'	Stadium: Mendizorrotza; Attendance: 17,624; Referee: José Luis Munuera Montero

17 May 2017 21	Celta Vigo	1–4	Real Madrid	Vigo
21:00 CEST	Aspas (yellow card) 38' (yellow-red card) 62'; Jonny (yellow card) 64'; Guidetti (yellow card) 66', (goal) 69'; Mallo (yellow card) 73'; Hernández (yellow card) 85'	Report	Ronaldo 10', 48'; Casemiro (yellow card) 30'; Benzema 70'; Ramos (yellow card) 85'; Kroos 88'	Stadium: Balaídos; Attendance: 22,838; Referee: Juan Martínez Munuera
Note: The match, originally scheduled for 5 February 2017, was postponed due to security concerns after a storm hit Vigo and damaged the roof of the stadium.

21 May 2017 38	Celta Vigo	2–2	Real Sociedad	Vigo
16:45 CEST	Cabral (yellow card) 28'; Roncaglia (yellow card) 42'; Aspas 54' (pen.); Hjulsager 90'	Report	Illarramendi (yellow card) 74'; Oyarzabal 82'; Juanmi 90+4'	Stadium: Balaídos; Attendance: 14,188; Referee: José María Sánchez Martínez

=== Copa del Rey ===
==== Round of 32 ====
30 November 2016 First leg	UCAM Murcia	0–1	Celta Vigo	Murcia
21:00 CET	Guichón (yellow card) 29'; Góngora (yellow card) 37'; Álvarez (yellow card) 74'	Report	Hernández (yellow card) 31'; Gómez 42'; Naranjo (yellow card) 52'; Rossi (yellow card) 78'	Stadium: La Condomina; Attendance: 5,103; Referee: Alfonso Álvarez Izquierdo

22 December 2016 Second leg	Celta Vigo	1–0 (2–0 agg.)	UCAM Murcia	Vigo
21:00 CET	Díaz 30'; Hernández (yellow card) 54'	Report	Morillas (yellow card) 29'	Stadium: Balaídos; Attendance: 9,161; Referee: Iñaki Vicandi Garrido

==== Round of 16 ====
3 January 2017 First leg	Valencia	1–4	Celta Vigo	Valencia
19:00 CET	Medrán (yellow card) 23'; Pérez (yellow card) 25'; Munir (yellow card) 57'; Parejo 58' (pen.); Siqueira (yellow card) 68'	Report	Aspas 3' (pen.); Bongonda 14'; Wass 19'; Sergio (yellow card) 57'; Guidetti 75'	Stadium: Mestalla; Attendance: 33,958; Referee: Xavier Estrada Fernández

12 January 2017 Second leg	Celta Vigo	2–1 (6–2 agg.)	Valencia	Vigo
19:00 CET	Rossi 61'; Sisto 90+3'	Report	Mangala (yellow card) 60'; Araújo 63'	Stadium: Balaídos; Attendance: 9,970; Referee: Alejandro Hernández Hernández

==== Quarter-finals ====
18 January 2017 First leg	Real Madrid	1–2	Celta Vigo	Madrid
21:15 CET	Ramos (yellow card) 6'; Marcelo 69'	Report	Díaz (yellow card) 42'; Hernández (yellow card) 45'; Aspas 64'; Jonny 70'	Stadium: Santiago Bernabéu; Attendance: 58,196; Referee: David Fernández Borbalán

25 January 2017 Second leg	Celta Vigo	2–2 (4–3 agg.)	Real Madrid	Vigo
21:15 CET	Mallo (yellow card) 35'; Danilo 44' (o.g.); Wass (yellow card) 54', (goal) 85'; Jonny (yellow card) 72'	Report	Ronaldo 62'; Danilo (yellow card) 75'; Vázquez 90'	Stadium: Balaídos; Attendance: 23,491; Referee: José María Sánchez Martínez

==== Semi-finals ====
2 February 2017 First leg	Celta Vigo	0–0	Alavés	Vigo
21:00 CET	Bongonda (yellow card) 33'	Report	Llorente (yellow card) 60'; Camarasa (yellow card) 67'	Stadium: Balaídos; Attendance: 18,989; Referee: José González González

8 February 2017 Second leg	Alavés	1–0 (1–0 agg.)	Celta Vigo	Vitoria-Gasteiz
21:00 CET	Feddal (yellow card) 39'; Édgar 82'; Hernandez (yellow card) 90+7'	Report	Aspas (yellow card) 39'; Díaz (yellow card) 53'	Stadium: Mendizorrotza; Attendance: 19,307; Referee: Antonio Mateu Lahoz

=== UEFA Europa League ===
==== Group stage ====
Pos	Team	Pld	W	D	L	GF	GA	GD	Pts	Qualification
1	(Netherlands) Ajax	6	4	2	0	11	6	+5	14	Advance to knockout phase
2	(Spain) Celta Vigo	6	2	3	1	10	7	+3	9	Advance to knockout phase
3	(Belgium) Standard Liège	6	1	4	1	8	6	+2	7	
4	(Greece) Panathinaikos	6	0	1	5	3	13	−10	1	

Source: UEFA
Rules for classification: Group stage tiebreakers

15 September 2016 1	Standard Liège (Belgium)	1–1	(Spain) Celta Vigo	Liège, Belgium
21:05	Dossevi 3'; Belfodil (yellow card) 70'	Report	Rossi 13'; Naranjo (yellow card) 55'; Hernández (yellow card) 57'; Bongonda (yellow card) 85'; Radoja (yellow card) 87'	Stadium: Stade Maurice Dufrasne; Attendance: 10,723; Referee: Hüseyin Göçek (Turkey)

29 September 2016 2	Celta Vigo (Spain)	2–0	(Greece) Panathinaikos	Vigo, Spain
19:00	Cabral (yellow card) 51'; Guidetti 84'; Wass 89'	Report	Zeca (yellow card) 42'; Villafáñez (yellow card) 50'; Samba (yellow card) 87'	Stadium: Balaídos; Attendance: 15,726; Referee: Luca Banti (Italy)

20 October 2016 3	Celta Vigo (Spain)	2–2	(Netherlands) Ajax	Vigo, Spain
19:00 CEST	Fontàs 29'; Planas (yellow card) 80'; Orellana 82'	Report	Sánchez (yellow card) 18'; Ziyech 22'; Gudelj (yellow card) 30'; Veltman (yellow card) 31'; Sinkgraven (yellow card) 57'; Younes 71'; Bazoer (yellow card) 90+2'	Stadium: Balaídos; Attendance: 18,397; Referee: Ivan Kružliak (Slovakia)

3 November 2016 4	Ajax (Netherlands)	3–2	(Spain) Celta Vigo	Amsterdam, Netherlands
21:05 CET	Schöne (yellow card) 12'; Dolberg 41'; Sánchez (yellow card) 59'; Ziyech 68'; Younes 71'; Sinkgraven (yellow card) 76'; Klaassen (yellow card) 90+3'	Report	Mallo (yellow card) 38'; Radoja (yellow card) 74'; Guidetti 79', (yellow card) 88'; Aspas 86'	Stadium: Amsterdam Arena; Attendance: 44,545; Referee: Paweł Raczkowski (Poland)

24 November 2016 5	Celta Vigo (Spain)	1–1	(Belgium) Standard Liège	Vigo, Spain
19:00 CET	Aspas 8', (yellow card) 33' (yellow-red card) 90+4'	Report	Sá (yellow card) 32'; Belfodil (yellow card) 34'; Fai (yellow card) 61'; Laifis 81', (yellow card) 82'	Stadium: Balaídos; Attendance: 16,470; Referee: Benoît Bastien (France)

8 December 2016 6	Panathinaikos (Greece)	0–2	(Spain) Celta Vigo	Athens, Greece
21:05 EET	Lod (yellow card) 34'; Wakaso (yellow card) 69'	Report	Guidetti 4'; Orellana 76' (pen.)	Stadium: Leoforos Alexandras Stadium; Attendance: 4,005; Referee: Andris Treimanis (Latvia)

==== Knockout phase ====
===== Round of 32 =====
16 February 2017 First leg	Celta Vigo (Spain)	0–1	(Ukraine) Shakhtar Donetsk	Vigo, Spain
19:00 CET	Radoja (yellow card) 67'; Wass (yellow card) 71'; Aspas (yellow card) 75'	Report	Leschuk 27'; Ordets (yellow card) 41'; Taison (yellow card) 45+1'; Srna (yellow card) 45+4'; Malyshev (yellow card) 75'; Rakitskiy (yellow card) 81'	Stadium: Balaídos; Attendance: 18,318; Referee: Gediminas Mažeika (Lithuania)

23 February 2017 Second leg	Shakhtar Donetsk (Ukraine)	0–2 (a.e.t.) (1–2 agg.)	(Spain) Celta Vigo	Kharkiv, Ukraine
21:05 CET	Leschuk (yellow card) 36'; Rakitskiy (yellow card) 90'; Fred (yellow card) 90+3'; Srna (yellow card) 119'	Report	Aspas (yellow card) 13', (goal) 90+1' (pen.); Roncaglia (yellow card) 26'; Jonny (yellow card) 63'; Cabral 108'; Guidetti (yellow card) 113'; Bongonda (yellow card) 116'	Stadium: Metalist Stadium; Attendance: 33,117; Referee: Slavko Vinčić (Slovenia)

===== Round of 16 =====
9 March 2017 First leg	Celta Vigo (Spain)	2–1	(Russia) Krasnodar	Vigo, Spain
21:05 CET	Wass 50'; Beauvue 90'	Report	Claesson (yellow card) 24', (goal) 56'	Stadium: Balaídos; Attendance: 18,414; Referee: Craig Thomson (Scotland)

16 March 2017 Second leg	Krasnodar (Russia)	0–2 (1–4 agg.)	(Spain) Celta Vigo	Krasnodar, Russia
19:00 CET	Kaboré (yellow card) 21' (yellow-red card) 86'; Gazinsky (yellow card) 42'; Granqvist (yellow card) 43'; Wánderson (yellow card) 47'	Report	Mallo 52'; Radoja (yellow card) 54'; Aspas 80'	Stadium: Krasnodar Stadium; Attendance: 33,318; Referee: Jorge Sousa (Portugal)

===== Quarter-finals =====
13 April 2017 First leg	Celta Vigo (Spain)	3–2	(Belgium) Genk	Vigo, Spain
21:05 CEST	Sisto 15'; Aspas 18'; Guidetti 38'	Report	Boëtius 10'; Castagne (yellow card) 27'; Buffel 67'; Trossard (yellow card) 73'; Schrijvers (yellow card) 85'	Stadium: Balaídos; Attendance: 21,608; Referee: Clément Turpin (France)

20 April 2017 Second leg	Genk (Belgium)	1–1 (3–4 agg.)	(Spain) Celta Vigo	Genk, Belgium
21:05 CEST	Trossard 67'; Dewaest (yellow card) 88'	Report	Sisto 63'; Hernández (yellow card) 88'; Jonny (yellow card) 90'; Mallo (yellow card) 90+3'	Stadium: Luminus Arena; Attendance: 18,833; Referee: Willie Collum (Scotland)

===== Semi-finals =====
4 May 2017 First leg	Celta Vigo (Spain)	0–1	(England) Manchester United	Vigo, Spain
21:05 CEST	Mallo (yellow card) 66'	Report	Fellaini (yellow card) 33'; Rashford 67'; Pogba (yellow card) 86'	Stadium: Balaídos; Attendance: 26,202; Referee: Sergei Karasev (Russia)

11 May 2017 Second leg	Manchester United (England)	1–1 (2–1 agg.)	(Spain) Celta Vigo	Manchester, England
21:05 CEST	Fellaini 17'; Blind (yellow card) 32'; Herrera (yellow card) 81'; Bailly (red card) 88'	Report	Aspas (yellow card) 66'; Roncaglia 85', (red card) 88'; Cabral (yellow card) 90+2'	Stadium: Old Trafford; Attendance: 75,138; Referee: Ovidiu Hațegan (Romania)

== Statistics ==
=== Appearances and goals ===
Last updated on 21 May 2017.

No.	Pos	Nat	Player	Total		La Liga		Copa del Rey		UEFA Europa League	
No.	Pos	Nat	Player	Apps	Goals	Apps	Goals	Apps	Goals	Apps	Goals
Goalkeepers
1	GK	(Spain) ESP	Sergio	44	0	26	0	8	0	10	0
13	GK	(Spain) ESP	Rubén Blanco	15	0	11	0	0	0	4	0
26	GK	(Spain) ESP	Iván Villar	1	0	1	0	0	0	0	0
Defenders
2	DF	(Spain) ESP	Hugo Mallo	41	3	22+1	2	6	0	12	1
3	DF	(Spain) ESP	Andreu Fontàs	27	2	17	1	0+2	0	8	1
4	DF	(Spain) ESP	Pape Cheikh Diop	19	1	5+11	1	1+2	0	0	0
19	DF	(Spain) ESP	Jonny	50	1	23+7	0	7+1	1	12	0
20	DF	(Spain) ESP	Sergi Gómez	36	1	21+4	0	3+3	1	3+2	0
21	DF	(Spain) ESP	Carles Planas	14	0	11+1	0	0	0	2	0
22	DF	(Argentina) ARG	Gustavo Cabral	45	3	25	2	8	0	12	1
24	DF	(Argentina) ARG	Facundo Roncaglia	48	3	30+2	2	7	0	7+2	1
Midfielders
5	MF	(Chile) CHI	Marcelo Díaz	39	2	17+9	1	7+1	1	4+1	0
6	MF	(Serbia) SRB	Nemanja Radoja	50	1	27+4	1	7	0	11+1	0
8	MF	(Chile) CHI	Pedro Hernández	45	1	20+6	1	7	0	12	0
11	MF	(Denmark) DEN	Pione Sisto	49	5	19+11	3	2+4	0	10+3	2
15	MF	(Spain) ESP	Álvaro Lemos	9	1	5	1	1	0	3	0
16	MF	(Spain) ESP	Jozabed	28	2	12+7	2	0+1	0	0+8	0
17	MF	(Denmark) DEN	Andrew Hjulsager	10	1	3+4	1	1	0	2	0
18	MF	(Denmark) DEN	Daniel Wass	54	7	29+3	3	5+3	2	10+4	2
23	MF	(Spain) ESP	Josep Señé	19	0	8+5	0	3	0	3	0
Forwards
7	FW	(Belgium) BEL	Théo Bongonda	42	2	26+4	1	5+1	1	3+3	0
9	FW	(Sweden) SWE	John Guidetti	42	9	14+9	4	2+4	1	12+1	4
10	FW	(Spain) ESP	Iago Aspas	49	26	25+7	19	5	2	9+3	5
12	FW	(Guadeloupe) GLP	Claudio Beauvue	19	2	5+8	1	0	0	0+6	1
25	FW	(Italy) ITA	Giuseppe Rossi	29	6	9+9	4	2+2	1	3+4	1
Players who have made an appearance or had a squad number this season but have left the club
4	DF	(Spain) ESP	David Costas	3	0	1	0	1	0	1	0
14	MF	(Chile) CHI	Fabián Orellana	9	4	6+1	2	0	0	1+1	2
