= 2017–18 Deportivo de La Coruña season =

Deportivo de La Coruña
2017–18 season
- Chairman: Tino Fernández
- Manager: Pepe Mel (until 24 October); Cristóbal (from 24 October to 4 February); Clarence Seedorf (from 5 February to 22 May)
- Stadium: Riazor
- La Liga: 18th (relegated)
- Copa del Rey: Round of 32
- Top goalscorer: League: Adrián (9); All: Lucas Pérez (9)
Home colours	Away colours	Third colours

During the 2017–18 Deportivo de La Coruña season, the club participated in La Liga and the Copa del Rey. Deportivo was relegated to the Segunda División following a 2–4 home defeat at the Riazor to Barcelona on 29 April 2018. The club ultimately finished in 18th position in La Liga.

== Squad ==
As of 31 August 2017

Note: Flags indicate national team as defined under FIFA eligibility rules; some limited exceptions apply. Players may hold more than one non-FIFA nationality.

No.	Pos.	Nation	Player
1	GK	POL	Przemysław Tytoń
2	DF	ESP	Juanfran
3	DF	ESP	Fernando Navarro
4	DF	ESP	Saúl
5	MF	ESP	Pedro Mosquera (captain)
6	DF	ESP	Raúl Albentosa
7	FW	ESP	Lucas Pérez (on loan from Arsenal)
8	MF	TUR	Emre Çolak
9	MF	ARG	Fede Cartabia
10	FW	ROU	Florin Andone
11	MF	ESP	Carles Gil (on loan from Aston Villa)
12	DF	BRA	Sidnei
13	GK	ESP	Rubén
14	DF	ESP	Alejandro Arribas
15	FW	ESP	Adrián (on loan from Porto)

No.	Pos.	Nation	Player
16	DF	POR	Luisinho
17	MF	URU	Fede Valverde (on loan from Real Madrid)
18	MF	BEL	Zakaria Bakkali (on loan from Valencia)
19	MF	ESP	Borja Valle
20	MF	BRA	Guilherme
21	MF	POR	Bruno Gama
22	MF	CRC	Celso Borges
23	DF	ESP	Gerard Valentín
24	DF	SUI	Fabian Schär
25	GK	ROU	Costel Pantilimon (on loan from Watford)
26	GK	NGR	Francis Uzoho
27	MF	ESP	Edu Expósito
28	FW	ESP	Pinchi
29	FW	PAN	Ismael Díaz

== Transfers ==
- List of Spanish football transfers summer 2017#Deportivo La Coruña

=== In ===
Date	Player	From	Type	Fee	Ref
15 June 2017	(Brazil) Guilherme	(Italy) Udinese	Transfer	€4,500,000	
22 June 2017	(Uruguay) Fede Valverde	(Spain) Real Madrid B	Loan	Free	
30 June 2017	(Spain) Oriol Riera	(Spain) Osasuna	Loan return	Free	
30 June 2017	(Spain) Rubén	(Belgium) Anderlecht	Loan return	Free	
30 June 2017	(Spain) Róber	(Spain) Levante	Loan return	Free	
30 June 2017	(Spain) Saúl	(Spain) Mallorca	Loan return	Free	
30 June 2017	(Spain) Juan Domínguez	(Spain) Mallorca	Loan return	Free	
30 June 2017	(Spain) Bicho	(Spain) Racing Ferrol	Loan return	Free	
30 June 2017	(Spain) Borja Valle	(Spain) Elche	Loan return	Free	
30 June 2017	(Argentina) Fede Cartabia	(Portugal) Braga	Loan return	Free	
12 July 2017	(Spain) Gerard Valentín	(Spain) Gimnàstic	Transfer	€600,000	
15 July 2017	(Belgium) Zakaria Bakkali	(Spain) Valencia	Loan	Free	
21 July 2017	(Switzerland) Fabian Schär	(Germany) 1899 Hoffenheim	Transfer	€2,000,000	

=== Out ===
Date	Player	To	Type	Fee	Ref
26 June 2017	(Argentina) Germán Lux	(Argentina) River Plate	Transfer	Free	
29 June 2017	(Spain) Pablo Insua	(Germany) Schalke 04	Transfer	€3,500,000	
30 June 2017	(Spain) Joselu	(England) Stoke City	Loan return	Free	
30 June 2017	(France) Gaël Kakuta	Hebei China Fortune	Loan return	Free	
30 June 2017	(Netherlands) Ola John	(Portugal) Benfica	Loan return	Free	
30 June 2017	(Belgium) Davy Roef	(Belgium) Anderlecht	Loan return	Free	
5 July 2017	(Spain) Oriol Riera	(Australia) Western Sydney Wanderers	Transfer	Free	
5 July 2017	(Spain) Laure	(Spain) Alcorcón	Transfer	Free	
10 July 2017	(Spain) Álex Bergantiños	(Spain) Sporting de Gijón	Loan	Free	
20 July 2017	(Morocco) Fayçal Fajr	(Spain) Getafe	Transfer	Free	
3 August 2017	(Spain) Róber	(Spain) Levante	Loan	Free	
23 August 2017	(Spain) Juan Domínguez	(Spain) Reus	Transfer	Free	

== Pre-season and friendlies ==
Team 1	Score	Team 2
Villalbés	0–2	Deportivo
Arosa	0–7	Deportivo
Silva	0–5	Deportivo
Cerceda	0–1	Deportivo
Bergantiños	1–6	Deportivo
Pontevedra	0–5	Deportivo
Racing de Ferrol	1–4	Deportivo
Porto	4–0	Deportivo
Oviedo	0–0	Deportivo
Deportivo	2–0	West Bromwich Albion
Tenerife	0–3	Deportivo

== Competitions ==
=== Overall ===
Competition	Final position
La Liga	-
Copa del Rey	-

=== Liga ===
==== League table ====
Pos	Team	Pld	W	D	L	GF	GA	GD	Pts	Qualification or relegation
16	Athletic Bilbao	38	10	13	15	41	49	−8	43 (Note: Athletic Bilbao finished ahead of Leganés on head-to-head goal difference: Athletic Bilbao 2–0 Leganés, Leganés 1–0 Athletic Bilbao.)	
17	Leganés	38	12	7	19	34	51	−17	43	
18	Deportivo La Coruña (R)	38	6	11	21	38	76	−38	29	Relegation to Segunda División
19	Las Palmas (R)	38	5	7	26	24	74	−50	22	Relegation to Segunda División
20	Málaga (R)	38	5	5	28	24	61	−37	20	Relegation to Segunda División

Source: La Liga, Soccerway
Rules for classification: 1) Points; 2) Head-to-head points; 3) Head-to-head goal difference; 4) Goal difference; 5) Goals scored; 6) Fair-play points (Note: Head-to-head record is used only after all the matches between the teams in question have been played)
(R) Relegated

==== Matches ====
Win Draw Loss Fixtures

20 August 2017 1	Deportivo	0–3	Real Madrid	A Coruña
22:15 CEST (UTC+02:00)	Bakkali (yellow card) 24'; Schär (yellow card) 53'; Cartabia (yellow card) 60'; Mosquera (yellow card) 84'; Andone (yellow card) 87'	Report	Bale 20'; Casemiro 27'; Ramos (yellow card) 53' (yellow-red card) 90+2'; Modrić (yellow card) 57'; Kroos 62'	Stadium: Riazor; Attendance: 27,801; Referee: José González González

26 August 2017 2	Levante	2–2	Deportivo	Valencia
20:15 CEST (UTC+02:00)	Bardhi 35'; Morales (yellow card) 68' (yellow-red card) 76'; Ivi 83' (pen.)	Report	Cartabia 5', (yellow card) 56'; Luisinho (yellow card) 11'; Sidnei 31'	Stadium: Ciutat de València; Attendance: 17,370; Referee: Javier Alberola Rojas

10 September 2017 3	Deportivo La Coruña	2–4	Real Sociedad	A Coruña
12:00 CEST (UTC+02:00)	Adrián 27'; Guilherme (yellow card) 47'; Andone 50'	Report	Juanmi 3', (yellow card) 44'; Illarramendi 4', 86'; Rodrigues (yellow card) 54'; Odriozola (yellow card) 80'; Llorente 83'	Stadium: Riazor; Attendance: 21,942; Referee: José Luis Munuera Montero

16 September 2017 4	Real Betis	2–1	Deportivo La Coruña	Seville
18:30 CEST (UTC+02:00)	Joaquín 14', 76'; Durmisi (yellow card) 49'; Adán (yellow card) 90+4'	Report	Cartabia 23'; Guilherme (yellow card) 27'; Navarro (yellow card) 59'; Luisinho (yellow card) 78'	Stadium: Benito Villamarín; Attendance: 46,174; Referee: Alberto Undiano Mallenco

20 September 2017 5	Deportivo La Coruña	1–0	Alavés	A Coruña
21:00 CEST (UTC+02:00)	Luisinho 45'	Report	Vigaray (yellow card) 50'; Maripán (yellow card) 62'	Stadium: Riazor; Attendance: 18,611; Referee: David Medié Jiménez

24 September 2017 6	Espanyol	4–1	Deportivo La Coruña	Cornellà de Llobregat
12:00 CEST (UTC+02:00)	Baptistão 5'; Arribas 22' (o.g.); Gerard 72' (pen.), 90'; Sánchez (yellow card) 75'	Report	Luisinho (yellow card) 19'; Borges 53'; Gama (yellow card) 90+3'	Stadium: RCDE Stadium; Attendance: 19,585; Referee: Ricardo de Burgos Bengoetxea

30 September 2017 7	Deportivo La Coruña	2–1	Getafe	A Coruña
13:00 CEST (UTC+02:00)	Luisinho (yellow card) 26'; Schär (yellow card) 64'; Pérez 66'; Juanfran (yellow card) 83'; Andone 87', (yellow card) 87'; Bakkali (yellow card) 89'; Guilherme (yellow card) 90+3'	Report	Suárez (yellow card) 33'; Amath 54'; Molina (yellow card) 62'; Bergara (yellow card) 69'	Stadium: Riazor; Attendance: 19,329; Referee: Xavier Estrada Fernández

15 October 2017 8	Eibar	0–0	Deportivo La Coruña	Eibar
12:00 CEST (UTC+02:00)	Arbilla (yellow card) 38'; D. García (yellow card) 56'	Report	Çolak (yellow card) 56'; Borges (yellow card) 79'	Stadium: Ipurua; Attendance: 5,125; Referee: Santiago Jaime Latre

23 October 2017 9	Deportivo La Coruña	1–2	Girona	A Coruña
CEST (UTC+02:00)	Albentosa (yellow card) 24'; Pérez 51' (pen.); Cartabia (yellow card) 76'; Guilherme (yellow card) 83'	Report	Aday 25' (pen.); Pons (yellow card) 27'; Ramalho (yellow card) 50'; Granell (yellow card) 66'; Portu 71'; Mojica (yellow card) 80'; A. García (yellow card) 90'; Bernardo (yellow card) 90+5'; Douglas Luiz (yellow card) 90+6'	Stadium: Riazor; Attendance: 17,588; Referee: Jesús Gil Manzano

30 October 2017 10	Las Palmas	1–3	Deportivo La Coruña	Las Palmas
21:00 CEST (UTC+02:00)	Rémy 7'; Michel (yellow card) 45'	Report	Borges 36', 54'; Pérez 69' (pen.); Juanfran (yellow card) 90+4'	Stadium: Gran Canaria; Attendance: 14,769; Referee: Carlos del Cerro Grande

4 November 2017 11	Deportivo La Coruña	0–1	Atlético Madrid	A Coruña
16:15 CET (UTC+01:00)	Juanfran (yellow card) 77'; Luisinho (yellow card) 78'; Andone (yellow card) 84'; Sidnei (yellow card) 90'	Report	Griezmann (yellow card) 9'; Savić (yellow card) 21'; Thomas 90+1'	Stadium: Riazor; Attendance: 22,807; Referee: Alfonso Álvarez Izquierdo

19 November 2017 12	Málaga	3–2	Deportivo La Coruña	Málaga
12:00 CET (UTC+01:00)	Rosales 15', (yellow card) 42'; Peñaranda (yellow card) 33'; Juanpi (yellow card) 63'; Castro 63'; Borja 84'; Juan Carlos (yellow card) 88'	Report	Pérez 23'; Guilherme (yellow card) 33'; Schär 52'; Navarro (yellow card) 55'; Bakkali (yellow card) 64'; Luisinho (yellow card) 87'; Çolak (yellow card) 90+1'	Stadium: La Rosaleda; Attendance: 24,563; Referee: Juan Martínez Munuera

26 November 2017 13	Deportivo La Coruña	2–2	Athletic Bilbao	A Coruña
12:00 CET (UTC+01:00)	Adrián 35'; Mosquera (yellow card) 39'; Cartabia (yellow card) 44'; Expósito (yellow card) 68'; Schär 76'; Albentosa (yellow card) 87'	Report	Susaeta 16'; Williams 60'; Laporte (yellow card) 71'	Stadium: Abanca-Riazor; Attendance: 20,879; Referee: José González González

2 December 2017 14	Sevilla	2–0	Deportivo La Coruña	Seville
18:30 CET (UTC+01:00)	Escudero (yellow card) 38'; Ben Yedder 45+1'; Krohn-Dehli 78'	Report	Cartabia (yellow card) 31'; Sidnei (yellow card) 73'; Pérez (yellow card) 86'	Stadium: Ramón Sánchez Pizjuán; Attendance: 32,136; Referee: José María Sánchez Martínez

9 December 2017 15	Deportivo La Coruña	1–0	Leganés	A Coruña
18:30 CET (UTC+01:00)	Adrián 24'; Schär (yellow card) 27'; Borges (yellow card) 48'; Guilherme (yellow card) 53'; Navarro (yellow card) 90+3'	Report	Pérez (yellow card) 39'; Gumbau (yellow card) 61'; Beauvue (yellow card) 89'; Gabriel (yellow card) 90'	Stadium: Abanca-Riazor; Attendance: 18,366; Referee: Mario Melero López

17 December 2017 16	Barcelona	4–0	Deportivo La Coruña	Barcelona
20:45 CET	L. Suárez 29', 47'; Paulinho 41', 75'	Report	Schär (yellow card) 32'	Stadium: Camp Nou; Attendance: 51,756; Referee: Antonio Mateu Lahoz

23 December 2017 17	Deportivo La Coruña	1–3	Celta Vigo	A Coruña
18:30 CET (UTC+01:00)	Borges (yellow card) 44'; Schär (yellow card) 49'; Andone 59'	Report	Wass 3'; Aspas 40', 53'; Blanco (yellow card) 62'; Mallo (yellow card) 90+3'	Stadium: Riazor; Attendance: 27,877; Referee: Alberto Undiano Mallenco

7 January 2018 18	Villarreal	1–1	Deportivo La Coruña	Villarreal
18:30 CET (UTC+01:00)	Ruiz (yellow card) 28'; Ünal 30'; Álvaro (yellow card) 54'; Mario (yellow card) 77'; Bacca (yellow card) 77'	Report	Guilherme (yellow card) 60'; Luisinho (yellow card) 72'; Sidnei (yellow card) 77'; Andone 84'	Stadium: La Cerámica; Attendance: 15,441; Referee: David Medié Jiménez

13 January 2018 19	Deportivo La Coruña	1–2	Valencia	A Coruña
20:45 CET (UTC+01:00)	Mosquera (yellow card) 47'; Andone 88'	Report	Guedes 37'; Parejo (yellow card) 63'; Rodrigo 64'; Gayà (yellow card) 90+3'	Stadium: Riazor; Attendance: 19,096; Referee: Javier Alberola Rojas

21 January 2018 20	Real Madrid	7–1	Deportivo La Coruña	Madrid
16:15 CET (UTC+01:00)	Nacho 32', 88'; Bale 42', 58'; Modrić 68'; Ronaldo 78', 84'	Report	Adrián 23'; Andone (yellow card) 38'; Pérez (yellow card) 56'	Stadium: Santiago Bernabéu; Attendance: 63,504; Referee: David Fernández Borbalán

27 January 2018 21	Deportivo La Coruña	2–2	Levante	A Coruña
13:00 CET (UTC+01:00)	Borges (yellow card) 3' (yellow-red card) 34'; Luisinho (yellow card) 17'; Adrián 19'; Andone 45', (yellow card) 85'; Guilherme (yellow card) 72'; Schär (yellow card) 88'; Rubén (yellow card) 88'	Report	Lerma (yellow card) 30'; Doukouré (yellow card) 36'; Chema (yellow card) 48'; Campaña (yellow card) 57'; Roger (yellow card) 61'; Ivi 80', 84'	Stadium: Riazor; Attendance: 20,160; Referee: Pablo González Fuertes

2 February 2018 22	Real Sociedad	5–0	Deportivo La Coruña	San Sebastián
21:00 CET (UTC+01:00)	Willian José 32'; Illarramendi 62', 89'; Canales 75'; Elustondo 82'	Report	Schär (yellow card) 25'	Stadium: Anoeta; Attendance: 15,626; Referee: Alberto Undiano Mallenco

12 February 2018 23	Deportivo La Coruña	0–1	Real Betis	A Coruña
21:00 CET (UTC+01:00)	Bakkali (yellow card) 43'; Albentosa (yellow card) 65'	Report	Loren 54'	Stadium: Riazor; Attendance: 20,611; Referee: Carlos del Cerro Grande

17 February 2018 24	Alavés	1–0	Deportivo La Coruña	Vitoria-Gasteiz
18:30 CET (UTC+01:00)	Munir 61', (yellow card) 87'; Sobrino (yellow card) 90+3'	Summary	Krohn-Dehli (yellow card) 37'; Bakkali (yellow card) 68'; Luisinho (yellow card) 81'	Stadium: Mendizorrotza; Attendance: 15,820; Referee: Mario Melero López

23 February 2018 25	Deportivo La Coruña	0–0	Espanyol	A Coruña
21:00 CET (UTC+01:00)	Andone (yellow card) 17'; Mosquera (yellow card) 33'; Schär (yellow card) 60'; Cartabia (yellow card) 62'; Bóveda (yellow card) 83'	Summary	V. Sánchez (yellow card) 42'	Stadium: Riazor; Attendance: 18,148; Referee: David Fernández Borbalán

28 February 2018 26	Getafe	3–0	Deportivo La Coruña	Getafe
19:30 CET (UTC+01:00)	Mora (yellow card) 25'; Ángel 40'; Bóveda 44' (o.g.); Amath (yellow card) 50'; Molina 82'	Summary	Luisinho (yellow card) 20'; Krohn-Dehli (yellow card) 34'; Mosquera (yellow card) 57'; Bóveda (yellow card) 88'	Stadium: Coliseum Alfonso Pérez; Attendance: 5,097; Referee: José Luis Munuera Montero

3 March 2018 27	Deportivo La Coruña	1–1	Eibar	A Coruña
18:30 CET (UTC+01:00)	Andone 33'; Koval (red card) 39'; Sidnei (yellow card) 89'	Summary	Inui 11'; Peña (yellow card) 64'; José Ángel (yellow card) 78'	Stadium: Riazor; Attendance: 19,437; Referee: Santiago Jaime Latre

9 March 2018 28	Girona	2–0	Deportivo La Coruña	Girona
21:00 CET (UTC+01:00)	Stuani 21'; Juanpe 57'; Pons (yellow card) 65'	Summary	Muntari (yellow card) 45'; Navarro (yellow card) 56'; Albentosa (yellow card) 77'; Mosquera (yellow card) 80'	Stadium: Montilivi; Attendance: 10,461; Referee: Alberto Undiano Mallenco

17 March 2018 29	Deportivo La Coruña	1–1	Las Palmas	A Coruña
13:00 CEST (UTC+02:00)	Albentosa 22'; Navarro (yellow card) 27'; Muntari (yellow card) 47'; Guilherme (yellow card) 84'	Summary	Halilović 3'; Momo (yellow card) 20'; J. Castellano (yellow card) 53'; David Simón (yellow card) 65'	Stadium: Riazor; Attendance: 18,966; Referee: Juan Martínez Munuera

1 April 2018 30	Atlético Madrid	1–0	Deportivo La Coruña	Madrid
20:45 CEST (UTC+02:00)	Carlos Isaac (yellow card) 28'; Gameiro 34' (pen.); Costa (yellow card) 69'	Summary	Luisinho (yellow card) 13'; Pérez (yellow card) 33'; Mosquera (yellow card) 90+2'	Stadium: Wanda Metropolitano; Attendance: 49,007; Referee: Daniel Trujillo Suárez

6 April 2018 31	Deportivo La Coruña	3–2	Málaga	A Coruña
21:00 CEST (UTC+02:00)	Pérez 6' (pen.); Muntari (yellow card) 34'; Guilherme (yellow card) 48'; Çolak (yellow card) 51'; Adrián 70', 85'; Rubén (yellow card) 90'	Summary	Miquel (yellow card) 16'; Guilherme 41' (o.g.); Hernández (yellow card) 43'; Torres (yellow card) 52'	Stadium: Riazor; Attendance: 17,066; Referee: Antonio Mateu Lahoz

14 April 2018 32	Athletic Bilbao	2–3	Deportivo La Coruña	Bilbao
20:45 CEST (UTC+02:00)	García 47', (yellow card) 61'; Susaeta 72'; Yeray (yellow card) 90+2'	Summary	Adrián 6', 14'; Valle 53'; Rubén (yellow card) 79'	Stadium: San Mamés; Attendance: 37,976; Referee: José González González

17 April 2018 33	Deportivo La Coruña	0–0	Sevilla	A Coruña
19:30 CEST (UTC+02:00)		Summary	Banega (yellow card) 11'; Layún (yellow card) 74'	Stadium: Riazor; Attendance: 24,671; Referee: David Medié Jiménez

20 April 2018 34	Leganés	0–0	Deportivo La Coruña	Leganés
21:00 CEST (UTC+02:00)		Summary	Çolak (yellow card) 28'; Adrián (yellow card) 90'	Stadium: Butarque; Attendance: 9,366; Referee: Alfonso Álvarez Izquierdo

29 April 2018 35	Deportivo La Coruña	2–4	Barcelona	A Coruña
20:45 CEST (UTC+02:00)	Schär (yellow card) 20'; Pérez 40'; Çolak 64'	Summary	Coutinho 7'; Messi 38', 82', 85'; Semedo (yellow card) 58'	Stadium: Riazor; Attendance: 25,799; Referee: Ricardo de Burgos Bengoetxea

5 May 2018 36	Celta Vigo	1–1	Deportivo La Coruña	Vigo
18:30 CEST (UTC+02:00)	M. Gómez 13', (yellow card) 54'; Mallo (yellow card) 56'; Boyé (yellow card) 66'; Sisto (yellow card) 71'	Summary	Luisinho (yellow card) 6'; Schär (yellow card) 56'; Pérez 90+1'	Stadium: Balaídos; Attendance: 20,816; Referee: Carlos del Cerro Grande

12 May 2018 37	Deportivo La Coruña	2–4	Villarreal	A Coruña
18:30 CEST (UTC+02:00)	Guilherme (yellow card) 22'; Valle 58', 88', (yellow card) 61'; Albentosa (yellow card) 74'	Summary	Castillejo 2', 45'; Trigueros 31'; Cheryshev 90+2'	Stadium: Riazor; Attendance: 12,904; Referee: Alejandro Hernández Hernández

20 May 2018 38	Valencia	2–1	Deportivo La Coruña	Valencia
12:00 CEST (UTC+02:00)	Zaza 28'; Guedes 77'	Summary	Pérez 80'	Stadium: Mestalla; Attendance: 35,472; Referee: David Medié Jiménez

=== Copa del Rey ===
==== Round of 32 ====
26 October 2017	Deportivo La Coruña	1–4	Las Palmas	A Coruña
20:30	Expósito (yellow card) 9'; Juanfran (yellow card) 24' (red card) 24'; Guilherme (yellow card) 39'; Pérez 59'	Report	Viera (yellow card) 6'; Momo 8', 16'; Tana (yellow card) 33'; David Simón (yellow card) 49'; Calleri 81', 90'	Stadium: Abanca-Riazor; Attendance: 26,735; Referee: Antonio Mateu Lahoz

29 November 2017	Las Palmas	2–3 (6–4 agg.)	Deportivo La Coruña	Las Palmas
21:30	Gómez (yellow card) 32'; Samper (yellow card) 52'; Toledo 58'; Tannane (yellow card) 61'; Rémy 90+4'	Report	Çolak 42'; Valle 53', 80'; Valentín (yellow card) 73'	Stadium: Gran Canaria; Attendance: 7,558

== Statistics ==
=== Appearances and goals ===
No.	Pos	Nat	Player	Total		La Liga		Copa del Rey	
No.	Pos	Nat	Player	Apps	Goals	Apps	Goals	Apps	Goals
Goalkeepers
1	GK	(Poland) POL	Przemysław Tytoń	3	0	1+1	0	1	0
13	GK	(Spain) ESP	Rubén	28	0	27+1	0	0	0
14	GK	(Ukraine) UKR	Maksym Koval	2	0	2	0	0	0
25	GK	(Romania) ROU	Costel Pantilimon	7	0	6	0	1	0
26	GK	(Nigeria) NGR	Francis Uzoho	2	0	2	0	0	0
Defenders
2	DF	(Spain) ESP	Juanfran	36	0	34+1	0	1	0
3	DF	(Spain) ESP	Fernando Navarro	16	0	11+4	0	1	0
4	DF	(Spain) ESP	Eneko Bóveda	8	0	7+1	0	0	0
6	DF	(Spain) ESP	Raúl Albentosa	20	1	19+1	1	0	0
12	DF	(Brazil) BRA	Sidnei	22	1	21	1	1	0
16	DF	(Portugal) POR	Luisinho	30	1	29+1	1	0	0
23	DF	(Spain) ESP	Gerard Valentín	5	0	2+1	0	1+1	0
24	DF	(Switzerland) SUI	Fabian Schär	27	2	25	2	2	0
33	DF	(Cameroon) CMR	Steve One	2	0	1	0	1	0
34	DF	(Spain) ESP	Mujaid	2	0	1+1	0	0	0
Midfielders
5	MF	(Spain) ESP	Pedro Mosquera	25	0	16+7	0	1+1	0
8	MF	(Turkey) TUR	Emre Çolak	27	2	17+9	1	1	1
9	MF	(Argentina) ARG	Fede Cartabia	20	2	16+4	2	0	0
11	MF	(Spain) ESP	Carles Gil	11	0	6+4	0	1	0
14	MF	(Denmark) DEN	Michael Krohn-Dehli	11	0	10+1	0	0	0
17	MF	(Uruguay) URU	Fede Valverde	25	0	12+12	0	1	0
18	MF	(Belgium) BEL	Zakaria Bakkali	24	0	10+13	0	1	0
19	MF	(Spain) ESP	Borja Valle	18	5	3+14	3	1	2
20	MF	(Brazil) BRA	Guilherme	33	0	31	0	2	0
22	MF	(Costa Rica) CRC	Celso Borges	32	3	26+6	3	0	0
27	MF	(Spain) ESP	Edu Expósito	5	0	0+3	0	1+1	0
—	MF	(Spain) ESP	Bicho	0	0	0	0	0	0
Forwards
7	FW	(Spain) ESP	Lucas Pérez	37	9	31+4	8	2	1
10	FW	(Romania) ROU	Florin Andone	30	6	16+13	6	0+1	0
15	FW	(Spain) ESP	Adrián	31	9	26+4	9	0+1	0
28	FW	(Spain) ESP	Pinchi	1	0	0	0	0+1	0
Players transferred out during the season
4	DF	(Spain) ESP	Saúl	1	0	0	0	1	0
14	DF	(Spain) ESP	Alejandro Arribas	3	0	3	0	0	0
21	MF	(Portugal) POR	Bruno Gama	7	0	1+5	0	1	0

Last updated: 30 May 2018
Source: BDFutbol
