= Lucas Pérez =

Spanish footballer (born 1988)

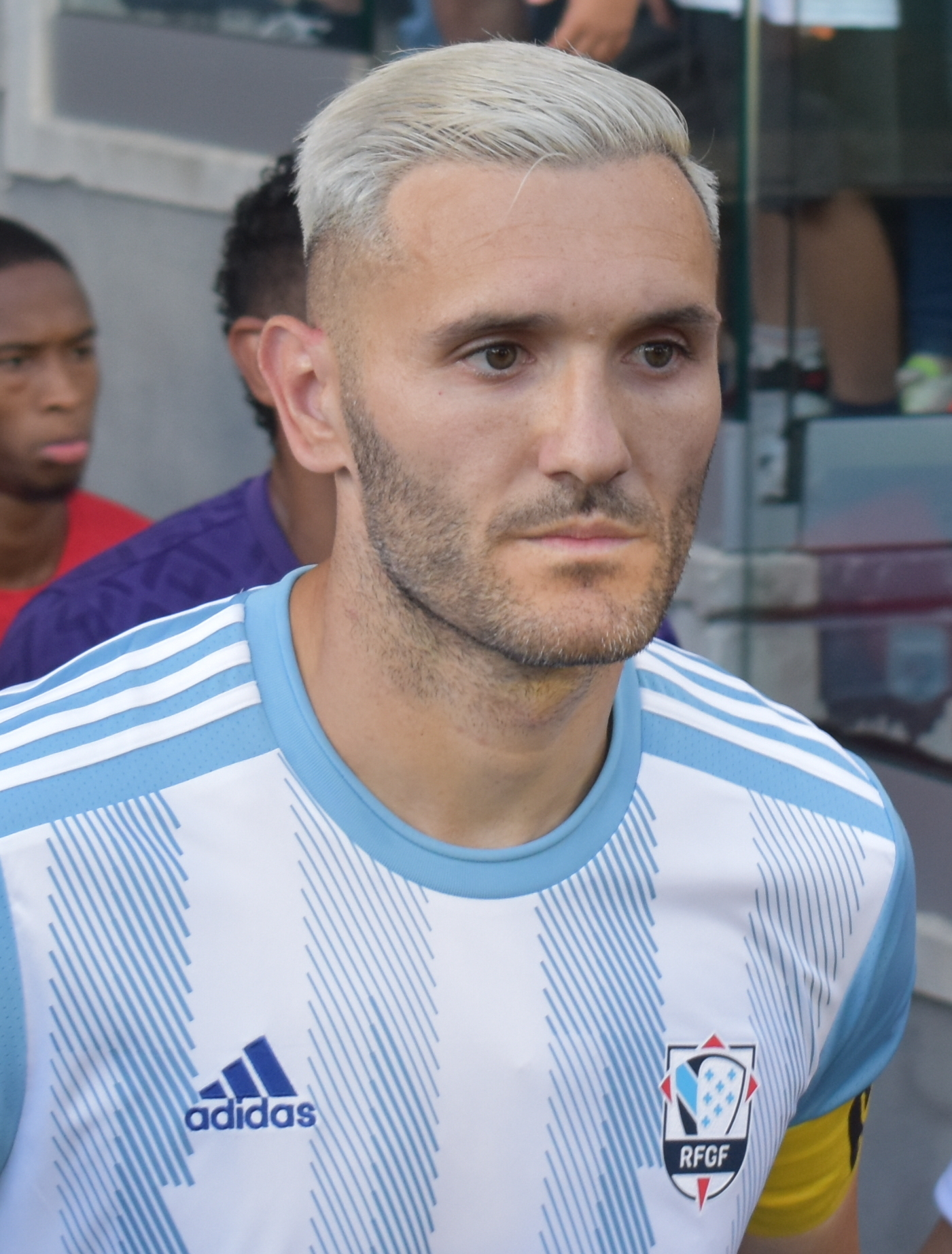
- Pérez with Galicia in 2024

Personal information
- Full name: Lucas Pérez Martínez
- Date of birth: 10 September 1988 (age 38)
- Place of birth: A Coruña, Spain
- Height: 1.80 m (5 ft 11 in)
- Position: Forward

Youth career
- Victoria
- Atlético Arteixo
- Alavés
- Montañeros
- Órdenes

Senior career*
Years	Team	Apps	(Gls)
2007–2009	Atlético Madrid C	55	(18)
2009–2011	Rayo Vallecano B	44	(25)
2010–2011	Rayo Vallecano	6	(1)
2011–2013	Karpaty Lviv	51	(14)
2013	→ Dynamo Kyiv (loan)	0	(0)
2013–2015	PAOK	32	(9)
2014–2015	→ Deportivo La Coruña (loan)	21	(6)
2015–2016	Deportivo La Coruña	37	(18)
2016–2018	Arsenal	11	(1)
2017–2018	→ Deportivo La Coruña (loan)	35	(8)
2018–2019	West Ham United	15	(3)
2019–2021	Alavés	62	(15)
2021–2022	Elche	18	(2)
2022	Cádiz	29	(6)
2023–2025	Deportivo La Coruña	69	(24)
2025	PSV	2	(0)
2026	Cádiz	7	(1)

International career^{‡}
2016–	Galicia	2	(0)
- * Club domestic league appearances and goals as of 00:59, 4 June 2026 (UTC) ‡ National team caps and goals as of 23:02, 24 February 2025 (UTC)

Lucas Pérez Martínez (Spanish pronunciation: [ˈlukas ˈpeɾeθ maɾˈtineθ]; born 10 September 1988) is a Spanish professional footballer who plays as a forward.

After spending the first years of his career in the lower leagues, only appearing sporadically for the first team of Rayo Vallecano in the Segunda División, he first made a name for himself with Karpaty Lviv in the Ukrainian Premier League. In 2013, he signed with PAOK from Greece, and later returned to La Liga with Deportivo, where he scored 32 goals in 93 matches.

Subsequently, he represented English clubs Arsenal and West Ham United in the Premier League, before rejoining Alavés where he had played as a youth.

== Club career ==
=== Atlético and Rayo ===
Pérez was born in A Coruña, Galicia. After appearing for five clubs as a youth he moved to Madrid and joined Atlético Madrid's C team, playing two seasons in the Tercera División. In summer 2009 he signed with Rayo Vallecano, helping the reserves promote from the same level in his first year.

In the 2010–11 season, Pérez contributed five games and one goal (in a 3–0 home win against Real Valladolid on 6 November 2010) as Rayo returned to La Liga after eight years. He continued to be mainly registered with the B side, however.

=== Karpaty Lviv ===
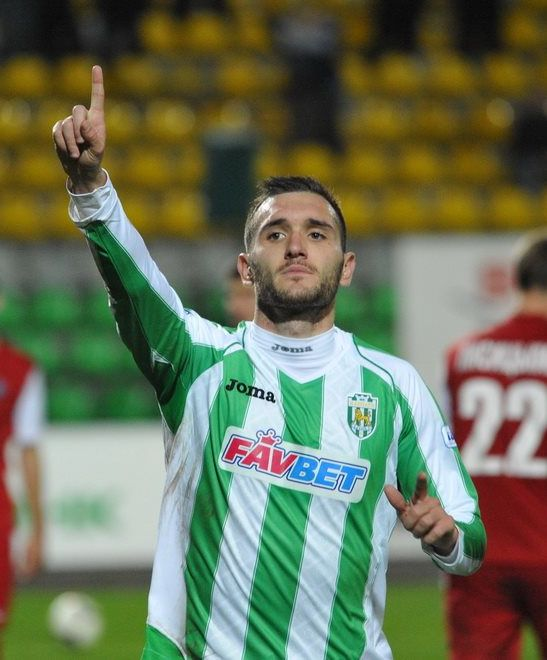
Pérez after scoring a hat-trick for Karpaty in 2012

On 17 January 2011, free agent Pérez joined Karpaty Lviv on a three-year deal. He scored his first goal for the team on 17 July, against Chornomorets Odesa in a 1–1 Ukrainian Premier League draw.

Pérez netted a hat-trick on 4 November 2012 in a 4–0 home victory over Kryvbas Kryvyi Rih, including a long-distance volley from a corner kick delivery. In January 2013, he joined fellow top-division club Dynamo Kyiv on loan for the remainder of the campaign, and later labelled his experience as "a nightmare".

=== PAOK and Deportivo La Coruña ===
On 5 July 2013, Pérez signed on a fee of €700,000 a three-year contract with Super League Greece team PAOK. He scored his first competitive goal on 17 August, contributing to a 3–0 home defeat of Skoda Xanthi, and on 24 November he equalised in a 3–1 win over Aris in the Derby of Northern Greece. He also helped to a runner-up run in the national cup, losing the decisive match to Panathinaikos.

On 18 July 2014, Pérez returned to Spain and joined his newly promoted hometown side Deportivo de La Coruña in a one-year loan deal, with a buyout clause. He scored in his first official appearance, having started in a 3–0 home victory against Valencia on 19 October which also marked his top-flight debut. The following matchday, he was replaced in the 15th minute of a 0–0 draw at Espanyol due to a knee injury.

Pérez only returned to action in January 2015, appearing 12 minutes in a 0–4 home loss to Barcelona. On 23 May, against the same opponent at the Camp Nou, he helped Dépor come from behind by scoring in the 67th minute of a 2–2 draw in the last round that prevented relegation.

On 23 July 2015, in his first competitive match upon his return to PAOK, against NK Lokomotiva in the second preliminary round of the UEFA Europa League, Pérez scored the opener after Róbert Mak's shot was saved, in an eventual 6–0 home rout. One week later, against Spartak Trnava in the same competition, he netted the game's only goal in the first leg.

On 12 August 2015, Pérez signed a permanent four-year deal with Deportivo. On 12 December, he took his season tally to 11 goals in only 15 games, helping to a 2–2 draw with Barcelona.

Pérez totalled a career-best 17 goals at the end of the campaign, eventually helping his side to escape relegation again.

=== Arsenal ===
On 27 August 2016, Arsène Wenger said that Pérez had completed a medical examination in order to join Arsenal after the paperwork was done; three days later, the transfer was confirmed by the club for a reported fee of £17.1 million. He made his competitive debut in the 2–1 Premier League home win over Southampton on 10 September, which coincided with both his birthday and that of teammate Laurent Koscielny, whom he assisted for his team's equaliser.

On 20 September 2016, during an EFL Cup away match against Nottingham Forest, Pérez scored his first goals for the Gunners, grabbing a brace in an eventual 4–0 victory in the third round. On 6 December, he contributed three goals in 39 minutes to a 4–1 away defeat of Basel in the UEFA Champions League's group stage, helping them win the group.

Pérez netted for the first time in the domestic league on 3 January 2017, helping his team come back from 3–0 down to draw 3–3 at Bournemouth. Towards the end of the month, he provided an assist to Danny Welbeck's first-ever brace for Arsenal, in a 5–0 away win against Southampton in the FA Cup.

On 31 August 2017, Pérez rejoined Deportivo on a season-long loan.

=== West Ham United ===
On 9 August 2018, Pérez signed a three-year contract with West Ham United for a reported fee of £4 million. He made his league debut for his new club nine days later, coming on as a 77th-minute substitute for Mark Noble in a 1–2 home loss to Bournemouth. He scored his first goal for them on 26 September, in their 8–0 demolition of Macclesfield Town in the EFL Cup.

On 4 December 2018, Pérez scored his first league goals for 700 days: coming on for Marko Arnautović, he scored twice in a 3–1 home victory against Cardiff City, becoming the first West Ham player to achieve the feat as a substitute since Paulo Wanchope in 2000.

=== Alavés ===
In May 2019, West Ham accepted an offer from Alavés for Peréz for a fee of €2.5m subject to a medical. He officially signed for the club on 3 June, making his league debut on 18 August by playing the last minutes of the 1–0 home victory over Levante. He scored his first goal on 29 September, the first in a 2–0 win against Mallorca also at the Mendizorrotza Stadium.

On 29 October 2019, Pérez equalised in a 1–1 home draw with Atlético Madrid, becoming the first Alavés player to score in five consecutive La Liga games since 1955. He repeated the feat the following match (at Osasuna, 4–2 loss), and in the process became their first player to achieve that in six consecutive fixtures. He found the net for the seventh time on 9 November against Real Valladolid, becoming the first player in the history of the competition to score in seven consecutive matches with two different teams, as he had done it before with Deportivo.

Pérez terminated his contract on 18 August 2021.

=== Elche and Cádiz ===
On 31 August 2021, free agent Pérez signed a one-year deal with Elche, still in the top tier. The following 31 January, he moved to Cádiz of the same league on a 18-month contract.

=== Fourth spell at Deportivo ===
Pérez agreed to a return to Deportivo on 31 December 2022, with the deal being made effective at the opening of the January transfer window; the player himself paid €493,000 in order to be released. He scored a brace on his Primera Federación debut eight days later, in a 3–0 win over Salamanca.

On 12 May 2024, Pérez scored from a direct free kick in the 1–0 victory against second-placed Barcelona Atlètic, securing the club's return to Segunda División after four years. In the play-off final, he added three goals over two legs in a 6–3 aggregate win over Castellón to claim the title.

On 22 January 2025, Pérez terminated his contract after requesting to leave for "personal reasons".

=== PSV Eindhoven ===
On 23 February 2025, aged 36, Lucas moved to the Dutch Eredivisie with PSV Eindhoven on a short-term deal. He made his debut three days later, as a late replacement in the 2–1 home loss against Go Ahead Eagles in the semi-finals of the KNVB Cup.

On 24 March 2025, it was reported that Pérez had contracted active tuberculosis, potentially sidelining him for the remainder of the season.

=== Later career ===
After leaving PSV in July 2025, Pérez trained with Racing de Ferrol and had an unsuccessful trial at Leganés. On 2 April 2026, he returned to Cádiz on a contract until June.

== International career ==
Pérez earned his first cap for the Galicia autonomous team on 20 May 2016, appearing in the 2–2 friendly with Venezuela.

== Personal life ==
Pérez was abandoned by his parents at an orphanage at the age of two, being raised by his grandparents. His parents later returned to his life, asking him for large sums of money upon his success.

== Career statistics ==
As of match played 15 March 2025

Appearances and goals by club, season and competition
Club	Season	League			National cup (Note: Includes Copa del Rey, Ukrainian Cup, Greek Cup, FA Cup, KNVB Cup)		League cup (Note: Includes EFL Cup)		Continental		Other		Total	
Club	Season	Division	Apps	Goals	Apps	Goals	Apps	Goals	Apps	Goals	Apps	Goals	Apps	Goals
Rayo Vallecano	2009–10	Segunda División	1	0	0	0	—		—		—		1	0
Rayo Vallecano	2010–11	Segunda División	5	1	0	0	—		—		—		5	1
Rayo Vallecano	Total		6	1	0	0	—		—		—		6	1
Rayo Vallecano B	2009–10	Tercera División	30	20	—		—		—		—		30	20
Rayo Vallecano B	2010–11	Segunda División B	14	5	—		—		—		—		14	5
Rayo Vallecano B	Total		44	25	—		—		—		—		44	25
Karpaty Lviv	2010–11	Ukrainian Premier League	8	0	0	0	—		—		—		8	0
Karpaty Lviv	2011–12	Ukrainian Premier League	26	6	4	0	—		4 (Note: Appearances in UEFA Europa League)	1	—		34	7
Karpaty Lviv	2012–13	Ukrainian Premier League	17	8	1	0	—		—		—		18	8
Karpaty Lviv	Total		51	14	5	0	—		4	1	—		60	15
Dynamo Kyiv (loan)	2012–13	Ukrainian Premier League	0	0	0	0	—		0	0	—		0	0
PAOK	2013–14	Super League Greece	32	9	6	0	—		12 (Note: Four appearances in UEFA Champions League, eight appearances and one goal in UEFA Europa League)	1	—		50	10
PAOK	2015–16	Super League Greece	0	0	0	0	—		2	2	—		2	2
PAOK	Total		32	9	6	0	—		14	3	—		52	12
Deportivo La Coruña (loan)	2014–15	La Liga	21	6	0	0	—		—		—		21	6
Deportivo La Coruña	2015–16	La Liga	36	17	1	0	—		—		—		37	17
Deportivo La Coruña	2016–17	La Liga	1	1	0	0	—		—		—		1	1
Deportivo La Coruña	Total		58	24	1	0	—		—		—		59	24
Arsenal	2016–17	Premier League	11	1	3	2	4	1	3 (Note: Appearances in UEFA Champions League)	3	—		21	7
Deportivo La Coruña (loan)	2017–18	La Liga	35	8	2	1	—		—		—		37	9
West Ham United	2018–19	Premier League	15	3	1	1	3	2	—		—		19	6
Alavés	2019–20	La Liga	34	11	0	0	—		—		—		34	11
Alavés	2020–21	La Liga	28	4	0	0	—		—		—		28	4
Alavés	Total		62	15	0	0	—		—		—		62	15
Elche	2021–22	La Liga	18	2	1	0	—		—		—		19	2
Cádiz	2021–22	La Liga	15	3	1	1	—		—		—		16	4
Cádiz	2022–23	La Liga	14	3	1	1	—		—		—		15	4
Cádiz	Total		29	6	2	2	—		—		—		31	8
Deportivo La Coruña	2022–23	Primera Federación	19	8	—		—		—		2 (Note: Appearances in Primera Federación play-offs)	1	21	9
Deportivo La Coruña	2023–24	Primera Federación	31	12	2	1	—		—		2	3	35	16
Deportivo La Coruña	2024–25	Segunda División	19	4	1	0	—		—		—		20	4
Deportivo La Coruña	Total		69	24	3	1	—		—		4	4	76	29
PSV	2024–25	Eredivisie	2	0	1	0	—		—		—		3	0
Career total			432	132	25	7	7	3	21	7	4	4	489	153

== Honours ==
PAOK

- Greek Football Cup runner-up: 2013–14

Arsenal

- FA Cup: 2016–17

Deportivo La Coruña

- Primera Federación: 2023–24

PSV

- Eredivisie: 2024–25
