= Borja Valle =

Spanish footballer (born 1992)

Personal information
- Full name: Borja Valle Balonga
- Date of birth: 9 July 1992 (age 34)
- Place of birth: Ponferrada, Spain
- Height: 1.77 m (5 ft 10 in)
- Position: Winger

Team information
- Current team: Ponferradina
- Number: 10

Youth career
- Ponferradina

Senior career*
Years	Team	Apps	(Gls)
2009–2011	Ponferradina B		
2010–2013	Ponferradina	18	(1)
2012	→ Celta B (loan)	13	(1)
2012–2013	→ Ourense (loan)	32	(4)
2013–2014	Ourense	32	(6)
2014–2016	Oviedo	50	(15)
2016–2020	Deportivo La Coruña	79	(12)
2017	→ Elche (loan)	17	(4)
2020	Dinamo București	9	(5)
2021	Oviedo	21	(0)
2021	Khor Fakkan	4	(0)
2022	Alcorcón	19	(4)
2022–2023	Cartagena	39	(6)
2023	Rapid București	16	(1)
2024–	Ponferradina	86	(14)
- * Club domestic league appearances and goals as of 25 May 2026

Borja Valle Balonga (born 9 July 1992) is a Spanish professional footballer who plays as a winger for Primera Federación club Ponferradina.

== Club career ==
=== Ponferradina ===
Born in Ponferrada, Castile and León, Valle was a product of local SD Ponferradina's youth system, making his senior debut with the reserves in the 2009–10 season. On 9 May 2010, he appeared in his first official match with the first team, playing the last 19 minutes of the 1–0 away loss against Zamora CF as the club was eventually promoted.

On 29 January 2011, Valle made his professional debut with Ponfe by coming on as a late substitute in a 1–0 defeat at SD Huesca in the Segunda División. His first goal in the competition came on 12 March, as he closed the 2–1 home win over Albacete Balompié.

=== Spell in Galicia ===
On 26 January 2012, Valle was loaned to Celta de Vigo B of Segunda División B. Six months later, he joined CD Ourense in the same league and also on loan.

Valle signed permanently with the latter on 6 June 2013.

=== Oviedo ===
On 21 May 2014, Valle moved to Real Oviedo also in the third division. He scored a career-best nine goals during the campaign, achieving promotion to the second tier.

=== Deportivo ===
Valle signed a three-year contract with La Liga club Deportivo de La Coruña on 21 June 2016. He made his debut in the competition on 26 August, replacing Florin Andone in a 0–0 away draw against Real Betis.

On 18 January 2017, Valle was loaned to Elche CF of division two until the end of the season. Upon returning, he scored his first goal for Deportivo and in the top flight on 14 April 2018, in the 3–2 victory at Athletic Bilbao.

=== Romania ===
Valle joined FC Dinamo București on 7 September 2020, on a two-year deal. In his first match in the Romanian Liga I, he scored from approximately 60 meters in the 1–1 home draw with FC Botoșani.

=== Later career ===
On 30 December 2020, Valle returned to Oviedo on a short-term contract. The following 26 July, he moved to the Emirati UAE Pro League with Khor Fakkan Club, but returned to his homeland in the next transfer window on a five-month deal at AD Alcorcón.

On 7 July 2022, free agent Valle agreed to a one-year contract at fellow second-tier FC Cartagena. In June 2023, he returned to Romania on a two-year contract with FC Rapid București.

== Career statistics ==
As of match played 25 May 2024

Appearances by club, season and competition
Club	Season	League			National cup (Note: Includes Copa del Rey, Cupa României)		Total	
Club	Season	Division	Apps	Goals	Apps	Goals	Apps	Goals
Ponferradina	2010–11	Segunda División	10	1	0	0	10	1
Ponferradina	2011–12	Segunda División B	7	0	3	2	10	2
Ponferradina	Total		17	1	3	2	20	3
Celta B (loan)	2011–12	Segunda División B	13	1	0	0	13	1
Ourense (loan)	2012–13	Segunda División B	32	4	1	0	33	4
Ourense	2013–14	Segunda División B	32	6	0	0	32	6
Oviedo	2014–15	Segunda División B	21	9	1	0	22	9
Oviedo	2015–16	Segunda División	29	6	1	0	30	6
Oviedo	Total		50	15	2	0	52	15
Deportivo La Coruña	2016–17	La Liga	7	0	2	0	9	0
Deportivo La Coruña	2017–18	La Liga	17	3	1	2	18	5
Deportivo La Coruña	2018–19	Segunda División	31	7	0	0	31	7
Deportivo La Coruña	2019–20	Segunda División	24	2	1	1	25	3
Deportivo La Coruña	Total		79	12	4	3	83	15
Elche (loan)	2016–17	Segunda División	17	4	0	0	17	4
Dinamo București	2020–21	Liga I	9	5	1	0	10	5
Oviedo	2020–21	Segunda División	21	0	0	0	21	0
Khor Fakkan	2021–22	UAE Pro League	4	0	0	0	4	0
Alcorcón	2021–22	Segunda División	19	4	0	0	19	4
Cartagena	2022–23	Segunda División	39	6	2	0	41	6
Rapid București	2023–24	Liga I	16	1	3	0	19	1
Ponferradina	2023–24	Primera Federación	19	3	—		19	3
Career total			367	62	17	5	384	67

== Honours ==
Oviedo

- Segunda División B: 2014–15
