= Facundo Roncaglia =

Argentine footballer (born 1987)

Personal information
- Full name: Facundo Sebastián Roncaglia
- Date of birth: 10 February 1987 (age 39)
- Place of birth: Chajarí, Argentina
- Height: 1.79 m (5 ft 10 in)
- Position: Defender

Team information
- Current team: San Telmo

Youth career
- Boca Juniors

Senior career*
Years	Team	Apps	(Gls)
2007–2012	Boca Juniors	88	(6)
2009–2010	→ Espanyol (loan)	21	(0)
2010–2011	→ Estudiantes (loan)	25	(0)
2012–2016	Fiorentina	67	(4)
2014–2015	→ Genoa (loan)	32	(0)
2016–2019	Celta	64	(2)
2019	→ Valencia (loan)	7	(0)
2019–2021	Osasuna	33	(2)
2021–2022	Aris Limassol	17	(0)
2022–2024	Boca Juniors	28	(0)
2024–2026	Sarmiento	34	(0)
2026–	San Telmo	8	(1)

International career
2013–2017	Argentina	14	(0)
- * Club domestic league appearances and goals as of 16:51, 6 May 2026 (UTC)

Facundo Sebastián Roncaglia (Spanish pronunciation: [faˈkundo roŋˈkaɣlja]; Italian: [roŋˈkaʎʎa]; born 10 February 1987) is an Argentine professional footballer who plays for Primera Nacional club San Telmo. Mainly a central defender, he can also play as a right-back.

== Club career ==
Born in Chajarí, Entre Ríos Province of Italian descent, Roncaglia made his professional debut with Boca Juniors, his first Primera División match being on 21 October 2007 in a 1–1 draw against Estudiantes de La Plata. He helped the capital club win the 2008 Apertura.

On 27 July 2009, Roncaglia signed with La Liga side RCD Espanyol on loan, being part of a squad that also featured five compatriots, including manager Mauricio Pochettino and former Boca teammate Juan Forlín. He returned to his previous team at the end of the season, only to move to Estudiantes immediately on loan.

Roncaglia left Boca in July 2012 as a free agent, having scored in the first leg of the 2012 Copa Libertadores final against SC Corinthians Paulista the previous month (1–1 home draw, 3–1 aggregate loss). He joined ACF Fiorentina from Italy immediately after, going on to appear in an average of 22 Serie A matches during his spell and also being loaned to Genoa CFC in the same league.

On 12 July 2016, Roncaglia returned to Spanish football after agreeing to a four-year deal at RC Celta de Vigo. On 11 May 2017, he headed home in a 1–1 away draw against Manchester United in the second leg of the semi-finals of the UEFA Europa League, but was also sent off following a spat with Eric Bailly and his team was ousted 2–1 on aggregate.

On 31 January 2019, Roncaglia was loaned to Valencia CF until June. On 8 August, after returning from loan, he signed a one-year contract with fellow top-tier club CA Osasuna for a fee of €250,000.

Roncaglia spent the 2021–22 campaign in the Cypriot First Division with Aris Limassol FC. On 18 July 2022, aged 35, he returned to Boca. In his second spell at La Bombonera, he notably won the 2022 national championship.

On 11 June 2024, Roncaglia joined Club Atlético Sarmiento. In February 2026, the 39-year-old moved down to Primera Nacional on a ten-month contract at Club Atlético San Telmo.

== International career ==
Roncaglia made his debut for Argentina on 15 November 2013, playing 63 minutes in a 0–0 friendly draw in Ecuador. He was selected by coach Gerardo Martino for the 2015 Copa América and started in the team's opening fixture, a 2–2 draw against Paraguay in La Serena.

== Career statistics ==
As of 2 May 2019

Appearances and goals by club, season and competition
Club	Season	League			National Cup		Continental		Total	
Club	Season	Division	Apps	Goals	Apps	Goals	Apps	Goals	Apps	Goals
Boca Juniors	2008–09	Argentine Primera División	22	2	0	0	10	0	32	2
Boca Juniors	2011–12	Argentine Primera División	31	2	4	1	11	1	46	4
Boca Juniors	Total		53	4	4	1	21	1	78	6
Espanyol (loan)	2009–10	La Liga	21	0	2	0	6	0	29	0
Estudiantes (loan)	2010–11	Argentine Primera División	25	0	0	0	9	0	34	0
Fiorentina	2012–13	Serie A	24	3	2	0	0	0	26	3
Fiorentina	2013–14	Serie A	13	3	2	0	10	0	25	3
Fiorentina	2015–16	Serie A	30	1	0	0	3	0	33	1
Fiorentina	Total		67	4	4	0	13	0	84	7
Genoa (loan)	2014–15	Serie A	32	0	0	0	0	0	32	0
Celta	2016–17	La Liga	31	2	7	0	9	1	47	3
Celta	2017–18	La Liga	21	0	1	0	0	0	22	0
Celta	2018–19	La Liga	12	0	1	0	0	0	13	0
Celta	Total		64	2	9	0	9	1	82	3
Valencia (loan)	2018–19	La Liga	7	0	1	0	3	0	11	0
Career total			269	13	20	1	61	2	350	16

== Honours ==
Boca Juniors

- Argentine Primera División: 2008 Apertura, 2011 Apertura, 2022
- Copa Argentina: 2011–12
- Supercopa Argentina: 2022
- Recopa Sudamericana: 2008

Estudiantes

- Argentine Primera División: 2010 Apertura

Valencia

- Copa del Rey: 2018–19

Fiorentina

- Coppa Italia runner-up: 2013–14

Argentina

- Copa América runner-up: 2015, 2016
