= Florin Andone =

Romanian footballer (born 1993)

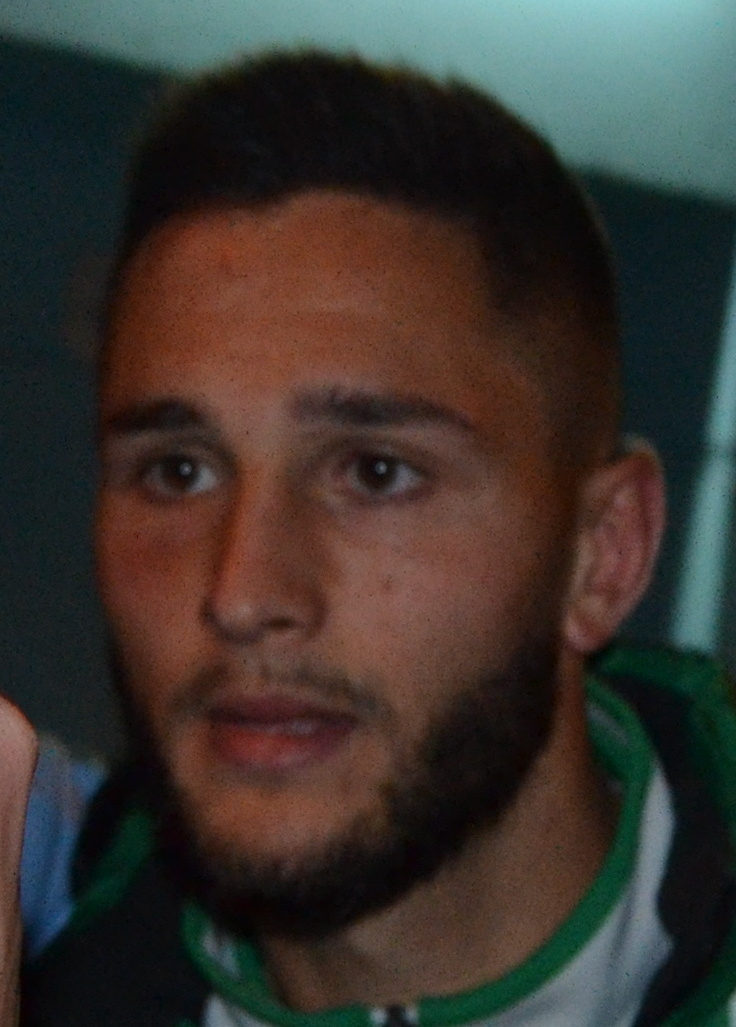
- Andone in 2015

Personal information
- Full name: Florin Andone
- Date of birth: 11 April 1993 (age 33)
- Place of birth: Joldești, Romania
- Height: 1.80 m (5 ft 11 in)
- Position: Striker

Team information
- Current team: Atlético Baleares
- Number: 10

Youth career
- –2005: CSȘ Botoșani
- 2005–2008: Vinaròs
- 2008–2011: Castellón
- 2011–2012: Villarreal

Senior career*
Years	Team	Apps	(Gls)
2011	Castellón	4	(0)
2011–2014	Villarreal C	36	(11)
2013–2014	→ Atlético Baleares (loan)	34	(12)
2014	Córdoba B	8	(2)
2014–2016	Córdoba	56	(26)
2016–2018	Deportivo La Coruña	66	(19)
2018–2022	Brighton & Hove Albion	26	(4)
2019–2020	→ Galatasaray (loan)	9	(2)
2021–2022	→ Cádiz (loan)	5	(0)
2022–2023	Las Palmas	19	(2)
2023–2024	Eldense	29	(3)
2024–	Atlético Baleares	23	(16)

International career^{‡}
2012	Romania U19	3	(0)
2015–2020	Romania	25	(2)
- * Club domestic league appearances and goals as of 2 November 2026 ‡ National team caps and goals as of 15 October 2019

Florin Andone (Romanian pronunciation: [floˈrin anˈdone]; born 11 April 1993) is a Romanian professional footballer who plays as a striker for Segunda Federación club Atlético Baleares.

Raised in Spain from the age of 12, Andone began competing in the country's lower divisions before making his professional debut for La Liga team Córdoba in 2014. Two years later, he joined Deportivo La Coruña, and after another two years earned a move to Premier League side Brighton & Hove Albion. Following loans at Galatasaray and Cádiz, Andone signed with Las Palmas in 2022.

Andone earned his first full cap for Romania in a goalless draw with Northern Ireland in June 2015, and was selected in the squad for the UEFA Euro 2016.

== Club career ==
=== Early career ===
Born in Joldești, Botoșani County, Andone moved to Vinaròs in the Valencian Community in 2005, aged 12, to join his mother after his father died in a car accident. He immediately joined Vinaròs CF's youth setup, and in 2008 moved to Castellón.

Andone made his senior debut on 16 January 2011, coming on as a late substitute for Pau Franch in a 1–1 away draw against Orihuela in the Segunda División B championship. He appeared in three further matches for the club, which eventually suffered relegation.

On 2 June 2011, Andone joined Villarreal, returning to youth football. He also appeared with the C-team during the campaign, with the side in Tercera División.

On 15 August 2013, Andone was loaned to the third level's Atlético Baleares, in a season-long deal. He finished the campaign with 12 goals in 34 matches, with the Balearic outfit being one point shy of the play-offs.

=== Córdoba ===
On 3 July 2014, Andone signed a three-year deal with Córdoba, being initially assigned to the reserves in the same division. On 29 November, he was promoted to the main squad by manager Miroslav Đukić.

Andone played his first match as a professional on 3 December 2014, replacing Xisco in the 57th minute of a 1–0 away loss against Granada, for the season's Copa del Rey. He scored his first goal on the second leg, netting his side's only in a 1–1 home draw.

In his La Liga debut on 5 January 2015 Andone was handed his first start, and scored to confirm a 2–0 home win against the same opponent. On 16 January, in a 1–1 home draw against Eibar, he scored the first after only ten seconds, being the Andalusians' fastest goal in the top level, and the fourth overall.

Following Córdoba's relegation, he was named the Segunda División Player of the Month for October 2015 with four goals, which put his team in the top position.

In January 2016, as Sevilla, Málaga, Southampton, Aston Villa and Steaua București showed interest in Andone, he renewed his contract with the Blanquiverdes until 2018, receiving a wage per year 10 times higher (and 20 if his club earn promotion), and with a release clause of €20 million, the highest such figure in the club's history.

On 3 April, he struck his first hat-trick in a 4–4 draw at Gimnàstic de Tarragona. He ended his season with 21 goals after scoring the game's only at Mallorca to achieve a play-off place on 29 May, missing the final round in order to join up with Romania; he was ultimately beaten to the division's Pichichi Trophy by Elche's Sergio León.

=== Deportivo La Coruña ===
On 22 July 2016, top-flight club Deportivo La Coruña transferred Andone for €4.7 million plus 30% from a potential future transfer fee; it was the team's biggest purchase in the last nine years. He was given the number 10 jersey and made his debut as a substitute on 19 August in a 2–1 home win against Eibar, scoring his first goal on 5 November to open a 1–1 draw at Granada. He was named La Liga Player of the Month for December after contributing with three goals and two assists, including a brace in a win over Real Sociedad.

Andone scored his eighth goal of the season in a 1–1 league draw with Atlético Madrid, on 2 March 2017. On 26 April, he netted one for himself and also set up another goal in a 6–2 home loss to Real Madrid.

In August 2017, Deportivo La Coruña turned down a €13 million offer for the player from Premier League side Burnley, with club president Tino Fernández stating that Andone would only leave if his €30 million release clause is activated. Brighton & Hove Albion was also interested in transferring him, and made a €20 million bid which was also supposedly rejected. He scored six goals and assisted three more in the 2017–18 season, which ended in relegation for the Galician team.

=== Brighton & Hove Albion ===
On 25 May 2018, Andone signed a five-year deal with Brighton & Hove Albion for an undisclosed fee, and joined the Premier League side when the international transfer window opened on 8 June. The rumoured transfer fee was €6 million, representing the release clause in his contract in case of Deportivo La Coruña's relegation.

Andone scored for Brighton in his fourth appearance—and also his first start—away against Huddersfield Town in a 2–1 comeback victory, and netted again in the next match at the Falmer Stadium against rivals Crystal Palace, collecting the ball just inside the Palace half, dribbling into the area and scoring from an acute angle in a 3–1 victory.

On 5 January 2019, Andone scored on his FA Cup debut in a 3–1 away win against Bournemouth, and a month later he scored in a fourth round replay win against West Bromwich Albion. Before his goal, he elbowed opponent Sam Field's face without the officials seeing; he was later fined and banned for three matches.

On 24 August 2019, Andone was sent off in a Premier League match against Southampton, following a rash knee-high challenge on Yan Valery. Brighton manager Graham Potter described the tackle as "one we can't defend", and Paul Merson, speaking on Soccer Saturday, described it as worth "five red cards" and "one of the worst tackles you will ever see".

==== Loan to Galatasaray ====
After three league appearances, one goal and a red card for Brighton in August 2019, Andone agreed to a season-long loan with Turkish Süper Lig side Galatasaray on 2 September. Andone made his debut for the Turkish side on 20 September, starting in the eventual 1–1 away draw against Yeni Malatyaspor. Andone made his first start for the Süper Lig side on 5 October in a 0–0 away draw against Gençlerbirliği. He netted his first goals for Gala scoring a brace, one of which a penalty, in a 3–2 home victory over Sivasspor.

After suffering a MCL injury in November 2019 which ruled him out until the new year, he suffered a season-ending injury in a 2–0 away loss at Caykur Rizespor on 14 June: another MCL injury and ACL tears after colliding with opposition goalkeeper Tarık Çetin. He then returned to Brighton. He left scoring 2 goals in 12 appearances in all competitions.

==== Return to Brighton ====
Andone returned to Brighton and was to recover from his injury where in January 2021, Potter said that "Florin is making good progress." On 15 May, he returned to the matchday squad for the first time for the 2020–21 season, remaining an unused substitute in the 1–1 home draw against West Ham United. In September 2022, Andone had the final 12 months of his contract, due to expire in 2024, mutually terminated.

Andone returned to Spain and its top tier on 23 August 2021, after agreeing to a one-year loan deal with Cádiz.

=== Las Palmas ===
On 1 September 2022, Andone signed a one-season deal with Segunda División side UD Las Palmas on the final day of the summer transfer window. He helped in their promotion to the top tier with two goals, but left in July 2023 as his contract expired.

=== Eldense ===
On 30 July 2023, Andone signed a two-year contract with CD Eldense, newly-promoted to the second division.

=== Atlético Baleares ===
On 1 November 2024, Andone signed a contract with Segunda Federación club Atlético Baleares, until June 2025.

== International career ==
Andone stated that his dream is to play for the Romania national team, despite living in Spain for most of his life. He was called up by manager Anghel Iordănescu for the UEFA Euro 2016 qualification match against the Faroe Islands in March 2015, but was an unused substitute in the 1–0 win. Andone made his full international debut in another qualifier on 13 June 2015, playing the last 18 minutes in a 0–0 away draw against Northern Ireland.

On 17 November 2015, Andone scored his first international goal, exploiting an error by Italian goalkeeper Salvatore Sirigu for a last-minute equaliser in a 2–2 draw in Bologna. He was selected for UEFA Euro 2016 in France, where he started against the hosts in the opening game after recovering from a hand injury, and made two more substitute appearances in a group-stage exit.

Andone scored his first goal in front of the home crowd, and only second overall, on 5 September 2019 in a 1–2 defeat to Spain in a Euro 2020 qualifier.

== Style of play ==
Andone plays as a striker and has been praised for his work ethic.

== Career statistics ==
=== Club ===
As of match played 2 November 2026

Appearances and goals by club, season and competition
Club	Season	League			National cup (Note: Includes Copa del Rey, FA Cup)		League cup		Europe		Other		Total	
Club	Season	Division	Apps	Goals	Apps	Goals	Apps	Goals	Apps	Goals	Apps	Goals	Apps	Goals
Castellón	2010–11	Segunda División B	4	0	0	0	—		—		—		4	0
Villarreal C	2011–12	Tercera División	?	?	—		—		—		—		?	?
Villarreal C	2012–13	Tercera División	?	?	—		—		—		—		?	?
Villarreal C	Total		36	11	—		—		—		—		36	11
Villarreal B	2012–13	Segunda División B	0	0	—		—		—		—		0	0
Atlético Baleares (loan)	2013–14	Segunda División B	34	12	0	0	—		—		—		34	12
Córdoba B	2014–15	Segunda División B	8	2	—		—		—		—		8	2
Córdoba	2014–15	La Liga	20	5	2	1	—		—		—		22	6
Córdoba	2015–16	Segunda División	36	21	0	0	—		—		0	0	36	21
Córdoba	Total		56	26	2	1	—		—		0	0	58	27
Deportivo La Coruña	2016–17	La Liga	37	12	2	0	—		—		—		39	12
Deportivo La Coruña	2017–18	La Liga	29	7	1	0	—		—		—		30	7
Deportivo La Coruña	Total		66	19	3	0	—		—		—		69	19
Brighton & Hove Albion	2018–19	Premier League	23	3	4	2	0	0	—		—		27	5
Brighton & Hove Albion	2019–20	Premier League	3	1	—		0	0	—		—		3	1
Brighton & Hove Albion	2020–21	Premier League	0	0	0	0	0	0	—		—		0	0
Brighton & Hove Albion	2021–22	Premier League	0	0	—		—		—		—		0	0
Brighton & Hove Albion	2022–23	Premier League	0	0	—		0	0	—		—		0	0
Brighton & Hove Albion	Total		26	4	4	2	0	0	—		—		30	6
Galatasaray (loan)	2019–20	Süper Lig	9	2	0	0	—		3 (Note: Appearances in UEFA Champions League)	0	—		12	2
Cádiz (loan)	2021–22	La Liga	5	0	4	1	—		—		—		9	1
Las Palmas	2022–23	Segunda División	19	2	1	0	—		—		—		20	2
Eldense	2023–24	Segunda División	29	3	2	0	—		—		—		31	3
Atlético Baleares	2024–25	Segunda Federación	17	10	—		—		—		2 (Note: Appearances in Segunda Federación play-offs)	2	19	12
Atlético Baleares	2025–26	Segunda Federación	3	2	1	0	—		—		0	0	4	2
Atlético Baleares	2026–27	Segunda Federación	3	4	0	0	—		—		0	0	3	4
Atlético Baleares	Total		23	16	1	0	—		—		2	2	26	18
Career total			315	97	17	4	0	0	3	0	2	2	337	103

=== International ===
As of match played 15 October 2019

Appearances and goals by national team and year
National team	Year	Apps	Goals
Romania	2015	4	1
Romania	2016	9	0
Romania	2017	8	0
Romania	2018	0	0
Romania	2019	4	1
Total		25	2

As of match played 16 November 2019
Scores and results list Romania's goal tally first, score column indicates score after each Andone goal.

List of international goals scored by Florin Andone
No.	Date	Venue	Cap	Opponent	Score	Result	Competition
1	17 November 2015	Renato Dall'Ara, Bologna, Italy	4	Italy	2–2	2–2	Friendly
2	5 September 2019	Arena Națională, Bucharest, Romania	22	Spain	1–2	1–2	UEFA Euro 2020 qualifying

== Honours ==
Individual

- Segunda División Player of the Month: October 2015
- Segunda División Best Forward (first part of the season): 2015–16
- La Liga Player of the Month: December 2016
- Deportivo La Coruña Player of the Season: 2016–17
