= 2016 Montevideo Tournament =

Tournament details
- Host country: Uruguay
- Dates: 21–24 July
- Teams: 4 (from 2 confederations)
- Venue: 1 (in 1 host city)

Final positions
- Champions: (Uruguay) Nacional (1st title)
- Runners-up: (Spain) Celta Vigo
- Third place: (Spain) Deportivo La Coruña
- Fourth place: (Uruguay) Peñarol

Tournament statistics
- Matches played: 3
- Goals scored: 8 (2.67 per match)
- Top scorer: (Uruguay) Hernán Novick (2 goals)

The 2016 Montevideo Tournament was a summer football friendly tournament organized by La Liga. Matches were played at the Estadio Centenario in Montevideo, Uruguay. Uruguayan clubs Nacional and Peñarol (Primera División) were joined by Spanish clubs Celta Vigo and Deportivo La Coruña (La Liga). It was the inaugural edition of the competition.

== Participants ==
Nation	Team	Location	Confederation	League
Spain	Celta Vigo	Vigo	UEFA	La Liga
Spain	Deportivo La Coruña	A Coruña	UEFA	La Liga
Uruguay	Nacional	Montevideo	CONMEBOL	Primera División
Uruguay	Peñarol	Montevideo	CONMEBOL	Primera División

== Results ==
All matches lasted for 90 minutes. If a match was level after normal time then a penalty shoot-out took place to decide who advanced.

Bracket

Semi-finals
21 July 2016
Celta Vigo	2
Deportivo La Coruña	0
22 July 2016
Nacional	C
Peñarol	C

Final
23 July 2016
Nacional	2
Celta Vigo	0
Third place play-off
24 July 2016
Peñarol	2 (7)
Deportivo La Coruña (p)	2 (8)

=== Matches ===
==== Semi-finals ====
21 July 2016
17:30 UYT

Celta Vigo (Spain)	2–0	(Spain) Deportivo La Coruña
Aspas 68'; Radoja 90'	Report

Estadio Centenario, Montevideo
22 July 2016
20:10 UYT

Nacional (Uruguay)	Cancelled (Note: Match cancelled for security reasons following a dispute between the local government and AUF.)	(Uruguay) Peñarol

Estadio Centenario, Montevideo

==== Third place play-off ====
23 July 2016
15:00 UYT

Peñarol (Uruguay)	2–2	(Spain) Deportivo La Coruña
Novick 84', 88' (pen.)	Report	Guilherme 46'; Valle 78'
Penalties
Penalty scored Penalty missed	7–8	Penalty scored

Estadio Centenario, Montevideo

==== Final ====
24 July 2016
17:30 UYT

Nacional (Uruguay)	2–0	(Spain) Celta Vigo
Fernández 22'; Barcia 32'	Report

Estadio Centenario, Montevideo

== Goalscorers ==
Rank	Name	Team	Goals
1	(Uruguay) Hernán Novick	(Uruguay) Peñarol	2
2	(Spain) Borja Valle	(Spain) Deportivo La Coruña	1
2	(Spain) Guilherme	(Spain) Deportivo La Coruña	1
2	(Spain) Iago Aspas	(Spain) Celta Vigo	1
2	(Uruguay) Leandro Barcia	(Uruguay) Nacional	1
2	(Serbia) Nemanja Radoja	(Spain) Celta Vigo	1
2	(Uruguay) Sebastián Fernández	(Uruguay) Nacional	1

== Media coverage ==
Market	Countries	Broadcast partner	Ref
Argentina	1	GOL TV (Spanish)	
Bolivia	1	GOL TV (Spanish)	
Brazil	1	ESPN Brasil (Portuguese) (selected games); GOL TV (Spanish)	
Chile	1	GOL TV (Spanish)	
Colombia	1	GOL TV (Spanish)	
Costa Rica	1	GOL TV (Spanish)	
Dominican Republic	1	GOL TV (Spanish)	
Ecuador	1	GOL TV (Spanish)	
El Salvador	1	GOL TV (Spanish)	
Guatemala	1	GOL TV (Spanish)	
Honduras	1	GOL TV (Spanish)	
International	195	La Liga TV (Spanish)	
Mexico	1	GOL TV (Spanish); TVC Deportes (Spanish)	
Nicaragua	1	GOL TV (Spanish)	
Panama	1	GOL TV (Spanish)	
Peru	1	GOL TV (Spanish)	
Spain	1	beIN Sports (Spanish) tvG2 (Spanish)	
United States	1	FuboTV (English); GOL TV (English and Spanish)	
Uruguay	1	GOL TV (Spanish)	
Venezuela	1	GOL TV (Spanish)	
Total countries	195		
