= Raúl Albentosa =

Spanish footballer (born 1988)

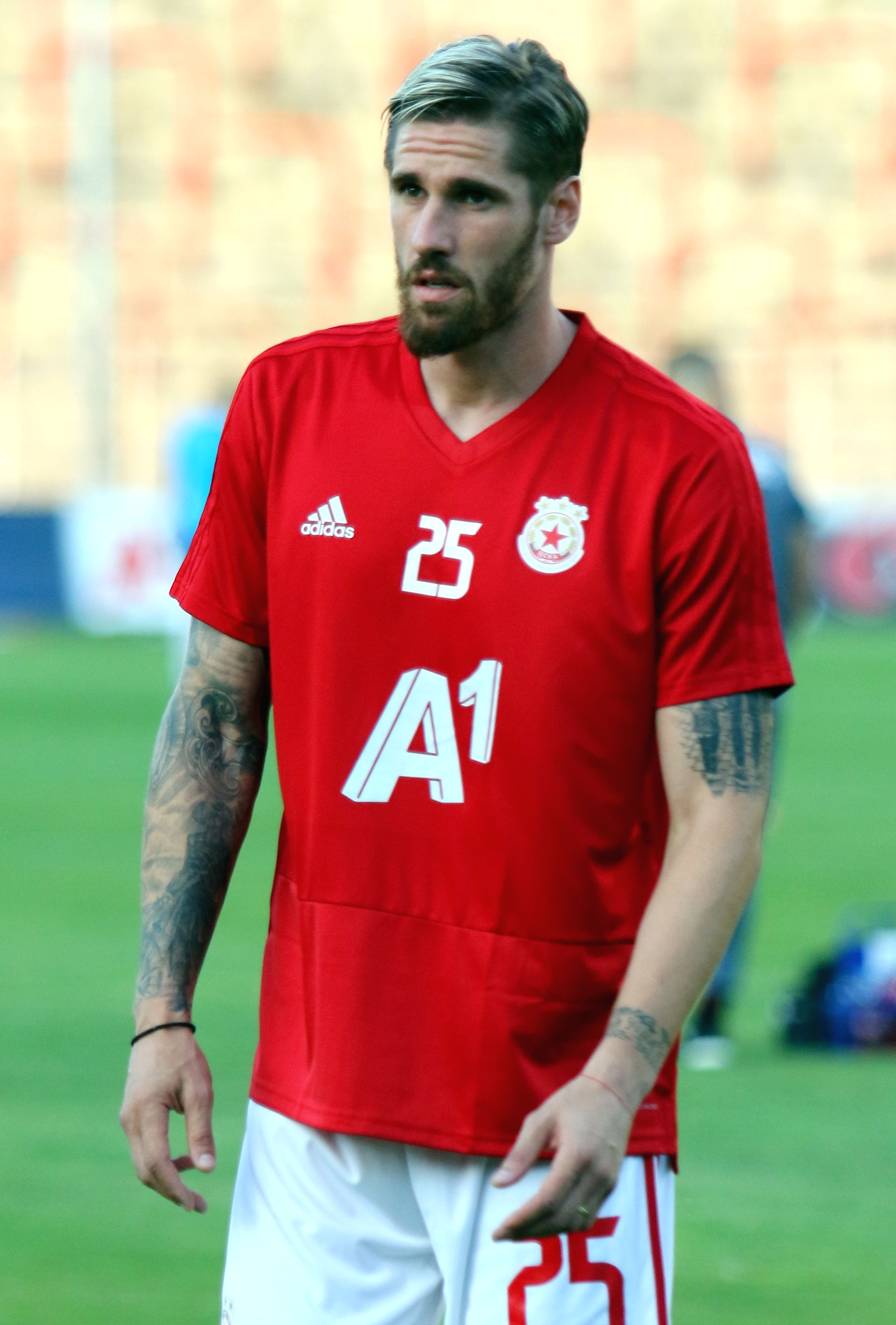
- Albentosa with CSKA Sofia in 2019

Personal information
- Full name: Raúl Albentosa Redal
- Date of birth: 7 September 1988 (age 38)
- Place of birth: Alzira, Spain
- Height: 1.93 m (6 ft 4 in)
- Position: Centre-back

Youth career
- 1997–2003: Alzira
- 2003–2007: Elche

Senior career*
Years	Team	Apps	(Gls)
2008–2010	Elche	3	(0)
2009	→ Caravaca (loan)	0	(0)
2010–2011	Murcia B	34	(10)
2011–2012	San Roque	31	(3)
2012–2013	Cádiz	33	(3)
2013–2015	Eibar	50	(4)
2015–2016	Derby County	8	(0)
2015–2016	→ Málaga (loan)	29	(2)
2016–2019	Deportivo La Coruña	47	(2)
2018–2019	→ Gimnàstic (loan)	11	(2)
2019–2020	CSKA Sofia	15	(2)
2021	Dinamo București	10	(1)
2022–2024	Vejle	72	(7)
2025–2026	Antequera	6	(0)
Total		349	(36)
- * Club domestic league appearances and goals

Raúl Albentosa Redal (born 7 September 1988) is a Spanish former professional footballer who played as a centre-back.

== Club career ==
Born in Alzira, Valencian Community, Albentosa played youth football with local Elche CF, making his senior debut in 2007–08 season with the B team in the Tercera División. On 15 June 2008 he played his first official game with the main squad, starting in a 1–0 away loss against Xerez CD.

In August 2009, Albentosa was loaned to Caravaca CF. He returned to Elche in January of the following year, however, and appeared in a further two matches in the Segunda División until the end of the campaign.

In the following years, Albentosa did not settle with any team. He competed in the fourth tier with Real Murcia Imperial, representing CD San Roque de Lepe and Cádiz CF in the Segunda División B.

On 21 July 2013, Albentosa signed with SD Eibar, recently promoted to the second division. He scored his first professional goal on 2 March of the following year, the last in a 3–0 home victory over Sporting de Gijón.

Albentosa made 33 appearances in 2013–14, helping the Armeros achieve promotion to La Liga for the first time ever. He made his debut in the competition on 24 August 2014, starting in a 1–0 home defeat of Real Sociedad. On 19 September, through a header, he scored his first goal in the top flight, his being the second of the 2–0 win at Elche.

On 16 January 2015, Albentosa signed for Derby County on a 2 1/2-year deal, after the English club paid the €600,000 of his buyout clause. He made his competitive debut for his new team eight days later, playing the first half of a 2–0 home victory against Chesterfield in the fourth round of the FA Cup.

Albentosa returned to Spain and its top division in the summer of 2015, agreeing to a one-year loan deal at Málaga CF. On 9 July 2016, he signed a permanent four-year contract with Deportivo de La Coruña in the same league.

On 31 August 2018, after suffering relegation, Albentosa was loaned to second-tier Gimnàstic de Tarragona for one year. He was recalled the following January, terminating his contract shortly after.

Albentosa moved abroad again in late July 2019, with the 30-year-old joining PFC CSKA Sofia of the First Professional Football League (Bulgaria). He played his first competitive match on 2 August in a 1–0 away loss to NK Osijek in the second qualifying round of the UEFA Europa League, and scored his first goal two months later in the 2–2 Eternal Derby draw against PFC Levski Sofia.

In April 2020, Albentosa left the Stadion Balgarska Armia by mutual consent. He moved to Romania with FC Dinamo București one year later, scoring his only Liga I goal on 2 May against FC Viitorul Constanța and leaving at the end of the season.

On 12 January 2022, Albentosa signed with Danish Superliga club Vejle Boldklub. His link expired in June 2024, and he was not offered a new deal.

On 7 August 2025, after one year of inactivity, the 37-year-old Albentosa returned to Spanish football and joined Antequera CF of Primera Federación.

== Honours ==
Eibar

- Segunda División: 2013–14
