= José Luis Munuera Montero =

Spanish football referee (born 1983)

- Full name: José Luis Munuera Montero
- Born: 19 May 1983 (age 43); Jaén, Spain
- Other occupation: Restaurateur

Domestic
Years	League	Role
2010–2013	Segunda División B	Referee
2013–2016	Segunda División	Referee
2016–	La Liga	Referee

International
Years	League	Role
2019–	FIFA listed	Referee

José Luis Munuera Montero (born 19 May 1983) is a Spanish football referee who officiates in La Liga. He has been a FIFA referee since 2019, and is ranked as a UEFA second category referee.

== Refereeing career ==
Munuera Montero began officiating in the Segunda División B in 2010, the Segunda División in 2013 and La Liga in 2016. He officiated his first match in La Liga on 22 August 2016 between Celta Vigo and Leganés. In 2019, he was put on the FIFA referees list. He officiated his first UEFA club competition match on 1 August 2019, a meeting between Romanian club Viitorul Constanța and Belgian club Gent in the 2019–20 UEFA Europa League second qualifying round. His first senior international match as referee was on 7 October 2020 between Andorra and Cape Verde.

As part of a referee exchange programme between UEFA and CONMEBOL, Munuera Montero was selected on 21 April 2021 as a video assistant referee for the 2021 Copa América in Argentina and Colombia. He will be joined by four of his compatriots at the tournament, marking the first time a team of European referees were selected to officiate at the Copa América.

On 18 February 2025, it was reported that he would be investigated for a possible conflict of interest and temporarily removed from refereeing duties while the process was ongoing. The investigation followed the disclosure of the existence of a company called Talentus Sports Speakers, a consultancy and sport management firm in which he was listed as the owner, and which allegedly had professional relationships with organizations such as the Royal Spanish Football Federation (RFEF), LaLiga, and UEFA, as well as clubs including Manchester City, Aston Villa, and Paris Saint-Germain. On 20 February, the RFEF concluded that he had not incurred a conflict of interest and that he could return to refereeing.

== Personal life ==
Munuera Montero was born in Jaén, and owns several restaurants in Córdoba. He graduated in Hispanic Philology from the University of Granada.
