= 2017–18 Celta de Vigo season =

Celta de Vigo
2017–18 season
- President: Carlos Mouriño
- Head coach: Juan Carlos Unzué
- Stadium: Balaídos
- La Liga: 13th
- Copa del Rey: Round of 16
- Top goalscorer: League: Iago Aspas (22); All: Iago Aspas (23)
Home colours	Away colours	Third colours

During the 2017–18 season, Celta de Vigo participated in La Liga and the Copa del Rey.

== Squad ==
As of 29 August 2017

Note: Flags indicate national team as defined under FIFA eligibility rules; some limited exceptions apply. Players may hold more than one non-FIFA nationality.

No.	Pos.	Nation	Player
1	GK	ESP	Sergio Álvarez (vice-captain)
2	DF	ESP	Hugo Mallo (captain)
3	DF	ESP	Andreu Fontàs (4th captain)
4	DF	ESP	David Costas
6	MF	SRB	Nemanja Radoja
7	FW	URU	Maxi Gómez
8	MF	CHI	Pablo Hernández
9	FW	SWE	John Guidetti
10	FW	ESP	Iago Aspas
11	MF	DEN	Pione Sisto
13	GK	ESP	Rubén Blanco

No.	Pos.	Nation	Player
14	MF	SVK	Stanislav Lobotka
16	MF	ESP	Jozabed
17	MF	DEN	Andrew Hjulsager
18	MF	DEN	Daniel Wass
19	DF	ESP	Jonny
20	DF	ESP	Sergi Gómez
21	FW	TUR	Emre Mor
22	DF	ARG	Gustavo Cabral (3rd captain)
24	DF	ARG	Facundo Roncaglia
25	GK	ESP	Iván Villar

=== Transfers ===
- List of Spanish football transfers summer 2017#Celta de Vigo

==== In ====
Date	Player	From	Type	Fee	Ref
22 May 2017	(Uruguay) Maxi Gómez	(Uruguay) Defensor Sporting	Transfer	€4,000,000	
30 June 2017	(Spain) Álex López	(Spain) Real Valladolid	Loan return	Free	
30 June 2017	(Spain) David Costas	(Spain) Real Oviedo	Loan return	Free	
30 June 2017	(Gabon) Lévy Madinda	(Spain) Gimnàstic	Loan return	Free	
30 June 2017	(Serbia) Dejan Dražić	(Spain) Real Valladolid	Loan return	Free	
30 June 2017	(Spain) Pedro Martín	(Spain) Mirandés	Loan return	Free	
1 July 2017	(Spain) Iván Villar	(Spain) Celta Vigo B	Promoted		
4 July 2017	(Spain) Jozabed	(England) Fulham	Transfer	€3,500,000	
15 July 2017	(Slovakia) Stanislav Lobotka	(Denmark) Nordsjælland	Transfer	€5,000,000	
29 August 2017	(Turkey) Emre Mor	(Germany) Borussia Dortmund	Transfer	Undisclosed	

==== Out ====
Date	Player	To	Type	Fee	Ref
22 June 2017	(Gabon) Lévy Madinda	(Greece) Asteras Tripolis	Transfer	Free	
30 June 2017	(Italy) Giuseppe Rossi	(Italy) Fiorentina	Loan return	Free	
1 July 2017	(Belgium) Théo Bongonda	(Turkey) Trabzonspor	Loan	€400,000	
4 July 2017	(Spain) Álvaro Lemos	(France) Lens	Loan	Free	
10 July 2017	(Spain) Samu Araújo	(Spain) Barcelona B	Loan	Free	
13 July 2017	(Spain) Carles Planas	(Spain) Girona	Transfer	Free	
20 July 2017	(Spain) Josep Señé	(Spain) Cultural Leonesa	Transfer	Free	
26 July 2017	(Spain) Pedro Martín	(Spain) Real Murcia	Transfer	Free	
17 August 2017	(Chile) Marcelo Díaz	(Mexico) UNAM Pumas	Transfer	Free	
18 August 2017	(Spain) Álex López	(Spain) Sporting Gijón	Transfer	Free	
29 August 2017	(Spain) Pape Diop	(France) Lyon	Transfer	€10,000,000	

== Pre-season and friendlies ==
Team 1	Score	Team 2
Sporting Gijón	0–2	Celta
Racing de Ferrol	0–0	Celta
Brentford	2–1	Celta
Burnley	2–2	Celta
Leverkusen	3–3	Celta
Celta	1–1	Udinese
Celta	4–1	Roma

== Competitions ==
=== Overall ===
Competition	Final position
La Liga	13th
Copa del Rey	Round of 16

=== Liga ===
==== League table ====
Pos	Team	Pld	W	D	L	GF	GA	GD	Pts
11	Espanyol	38	12	13	13	36	42	−6	49 (Note: Head-to-head points: Espanyol 8, Real Sociedad 4, Celta Vigo 4 (Espanyol 2–1 Real Sociedad, Real Sociedad 1–1 Espanyol, Espanyol 2–1 Celta Vigo, Celta Vigo 2–2 Espanyol, Real Sociedad 1–2 Celta Vigo, Celta Vigo 2–3 Real Sociedad).)
12	Real Sociedad	38	14	7	17	66	59	+7	49
13	Celta Vigo	38	13	10	15	59	60	−1	49
14	Alavés	38	15	2	21	40	50	−10	47
15	Levante	38	11	13	14	44	58	−14	46

Source: La Liga, Soccerway
Rules for classification: 1) Points; 2) Head-to-head points; 3) Head-to-head goal difference; 4) Goal difference; 5) Goals scored; 6) Fair-play points (Note: Head-to-head record is used only after all the matches between the teams in question have been played)

==== Matches ====
Win Draw Loss Fixtures

19 August 2017 1	Celta Vigo	2–3	Real Sociedad	Vigo
18:15 CEST (UTC+02:00)	M. Gómez 22', 50', (yellow card) 49'; Jonny (yellow card) 80'; Mallo (yellow card) 86'	Report	Oyarzabal 33'; Juanmi 80'; Willian José 88' (pen.); Illarramendi (yellow card) 90+2'	Stadium: Balaídos; Attendance: 16,207; Referee: Antonio Mateu Lahoz

25 August 2017 2	Real Betis	2–1	Celta Vigo	Seville
22:00 CEST (UTC+02:00)	León 31'; Feddal (yellow card) 64', (goal) 77'; Mandi (yellow card) 84'	Report	M. Gómez 10'; Jozabed (yellow card) 68'; Radoja (yellow card) 90+5'	Stadium: Benito Villamarín; Attendance: 45,761; Referee: Ricardo de Burgos Bengoetxea

10 September 2017 3	Celta Vigo	1–0	Alavés	Vigo
18:30 CEST (UTC+02:00)	M. Gómez 34', (yellow card) 90+3'; Jonny (yellow card) 44'; Aspas (yellow card) 52'; Jozabed (yellow card) 68'	Report	Vigaray (yellow card) 66'; Torres (yellow card) 80'; Alexis (yellow card) 86'; Ibai (yellow card) 89'	Stadium: Balaídos; Attendance: 6,133; Referee: Mario Melero López

18 September 2017 4	Espanyol	2–1	Celta Vigo	Cornellà de Llobregat
21:00 CEST (UTC+02:00)	Gerard 10'; Piatti 24'; Fuego (yellow card) 64'	Report	Aspas (yellow card) 48'; Mallo (yellow card) 55'; Sisto 69'; M. Gómez (yellow card) 76'; Cabral (yellow card) 77'	Stadium: RCDE Stadium; Attendance: 15,026; Referee: Javier Alberola Rojas

21 September 2017 5	Celta Vigo	1–1	Getafe	Vigo
21:00 CEST (UTC+02:00)	M. Gómez 25', (yellow card) 69'; Jozabed (yellow card) 57'	Report	Djené (yellow card) 17'; Antunes (yellow card) 66'; Suárez (yellow card) 74'; Ángel 86'; Jiménez (yellow card) 90+2'	Stadium: Balaídos; Attendance: 14,700; Referee: Daniel Trujillo Suárez

24 September 2017 6	Eibar	0–4	Celta Vigo	Eibar
18:30 CEST (UTC+02:00)	Escalante (yellow card) 11'; D. García (yellow card) 28'	Report	Cabral 17', (yellow card) 18'; Sisto 23'; Hernández 39'; Wass 72'	Stadium: Ipurua; Attendance: 5,345; Referee: David Fernández Borbalán

29 September 2017 7	Celta Vigo	3–3	Girona	Vigo
21:00 CEST (UTC+02:00)	Sisto 8'; M. Gómez 16', (yellow card) 42'; Wass 76'; Mor (yellow card) 90+3'	Report	Portu 10'; Stuani 14', (yellow card) 44'; Bernardo (yellow card) 21'; Juanpe (yellow card) 53', (goal) 86'; Alcalá (yellow card) 90'; Pons (yellow card) 90+2'	Stadium: Balaídos; Attendance: 16,126; Referee: Pablo González Fuertes

16 October 2017 8	Las Palmas	2–5	Celta Vigo	Las Palmas
21:00 CEST (UTC+02:00)	Bigas (yellow card) 51'; Aquilani (yellow card) 61'; Vitolo 90'; Rémy 90+3'	Report	Mor 16'; Aspas 20', 49', 76'; Jozabed (yellow card) 27'; Blanco (red card) 52'; Hernández 71'	Stadium: Gran Canaria; Attendance: 15,799; Referee: David Medié Jiménez

22 October 2017 9	Celta Vigo	0–1	Atlético Madrid	Vigo
16:15 CEST (UTC+02:00)	Jonny (yellow card) 49'; Cabral (yellow card) 71'; Hernández (yellow card) 82'	Report	Savić (yellow card) 16'; Gameiro 28'; Saúl (yellow card) 41'; Gabi (yellow card) 57'; Juanfran (yellow card) 89'; Partey (yellow card) 90+3'	Stadium: Balaídos; Attendance: 12,978; Referee: José Luis Munuera Montero

29 October 2017 10	Málaga	2–1	Celta Vigo	Málaga
20:45 CEST (UTC+02:00)	Hernández (yellow card) 34'; Adrián 45'; Castro (yellow card) 62'; Recio 83' (pen.)	Report	Mallo (yellow card) 15'; Aspas 76', (yellow card) 90+1'; Cabral (yellow card) 82'	Stadium: La Rosaleda; Attendance: 17,454; Referee: Santiago Jaime Latre

5 November 2017 11	Celta Vigo	3–1	Athletic Bilbao	Vigo
16:15 CET (UTC+01:00)	S. Gómez 16', (yellow card) 41'; Aspas 22', 26'; M. Gómez (yellow card) 64'	Report	Vesga (yellow card) 12'; García 38'; Balenziaga (yellow card) 58'; Aduriz (yellow card) 90+1'	Stadium: Balaídos; Attendance: 19,779; Referee: Jesús Gil Manzano

19 November 2017 12	Sevilla	2–1	Celta Vigo	Seville
18:30 CET (UTC+01:00)	Corchia (yellow card) 19'; Muriel 36'; Nolito 48'; Pizarro (yellow card) 86'; Soria (yellow card) 90+3'	Report	M. Gómez 13'; Aspas (yellow card) 62'; Jonny (yellow card) 89'	Stadium: Ramón Sánchez Pizjuán; Attendance: 35,030; Referee: Carlos del Cerro Grande

24 November 2017 13	Celta Vigo	1–0	Leganés	Vigo
21:00 CET (UTC+01:00)	Aspas 27' (pen.); Fontàs (yellow card) 84'; Jonny (yellow card) 89'	Report	Morán (yellow card) 26'; Mauro (yellow card) 65'; Gumbau (yellow card) 73'	Stadium: Balaídos; Attendance: 10,611; Referee: Alejandro Hernández Hernández

3 December 2017 14	Barcelona	2–2	Celta Vigo	Barcelona
13:00 CET (UTC+01:00)	L. Suárez (yellow card) 1', (goal) 62'; Messi 22'; Vermaelan (yellow card) 83'; Piqué (yellow card) 90+6'	Report	Aspas 20'; M. Gómez 70'; Roncaglia (yellow card) 74'; Jozabed (yellow card) 81'; Blanco (yellow card) 86'; Wass (yellow card) 87'; Sisto (yellow card) 88'; Mallo (yellow card) 90+5'	Stadium: Camp Nou; Attendance: 63,208; Referee: Mario Melero López

9 December 2017 15	Valencia	2–1	Celta Vigo	Valencia
20:45 CET (UTC+01:00)	Zaza 28', (yellow card) 58'; Gayà (yellow card) 60'; Parejo 81' (pen.)	Report	Aspas 46', (yellow card) 85'; M. Gómez (yellow card) 70'; Mallo (yellow card) 81'; Fontàs (yellow card) 86'; Wass (yellow card) 90+4'; Hernández (yellow card) 90+4'	Stadium: Mestalla; Attendance: 35,633; Referee: José Luis Munuera Montero

17 December 2017 16	Celta Vigo	0–1	Villarreal	Vigo
16:15 CET (UTC+01:00)	Jonny (yellow card) 81'	Report	Fornals (yellow card) 13', (goal) 34'; Costa (yellow card) 64'; Trigueros (yellow card) 80'	Stadium: Balaídos; Attendance: 18,215; Referee: Xavier Estrada Fernández

23 December 2017 17	Deportivo La Coruña	1–3	Celta Vigo	A Coruña
18:30 CET (UTC+01:00)	Borges (yellow card) 44'; Schär (yellow card) 49'; Andone 59'	Report	Wass 3'; Aspas 40', 53'; Blanco (yellow card) 62'; Mallo (yellow card) 90+3'	Stadium: Riazor; Attendance: 27,877; Referee: Alberto Undiano Mallenco

7 January 2018 18	Celta Vigo	2–2	Real Madrid	Vigo
20:45 CET (UTC+01:00)	Wass 33'; Mallo (yellow card) 67'; M. Gómez 82'; Aspas (yellow card) 88'	Report	Bale 36', 38'; Casemiro (yellow card) 44'; Navas (yellow card) 71'	Stadium: Balaídos; Attendance: 20,872; Referee: Santiago Jaime Latre

14 January 2018 19	Levante	0–1	Celta Vigo	Valencia
12:00 CET (UTC+01:00)	Morales (yellow card) 21'; Doukouré (yellow card) 80'; Luna (yellow card) 87'; Coke (yellow card) 88'	Report	Sisto 37'; Hernández (yellow card) 78'; M. Gómez (yellow card) 87'; Blanco (yellow card) 90+4'	Stadium: Ciutat de València; Attendance: 17,007; Referee: Alfonso Javier Álvarez Izquierdo

21 January 2018 20	Real Sociedad	1–2	Celta Vigo	San Sebastián
18:30 CET (UTC+01:00)	Willian José 10'; Zubeldia (yellow card) 56'	Report	Jozabed (yellow card) 16'; Aspas 20' (pen.); Lobotka (yellow card) 24'; M. Gómez 75'	Stadium: Anoeta; Attendance: 19,081; Referee: Antonio Mateu Lahoz

29 January 2018 21	Celta Vigo	3–2	Real Betis	Vigo
21:00 CET (UTC+01:00)	Aspas 12', 79'; Wass (yellow card) 46'; M. Gómez 57'	Report	García (yellow card) 15'; Joaquín (yellow card) 45'; Fabián (yellow card) 59'; Barragán (yellow card) 65'; Feddal (yellow card) 68'; León 71'; Guardado 90+1' (pen.)	Stadium: Balaídos; Attendance: 14,667; Referee: José María Sánchez Martínez

3 February 2018 22	Alavés	2–1	Celta Vigo	Vitoria-Gasteiz
18:30 CET (UTC+01:00)	Pedraza 4'; Munir 18'; Sobrino (yellow card) 48'; Alexis (yellow card) 77'; Aguirregabiria (yellow card) 89'	Report	Radoja (yellow card) 21'; Jozabed (yellow card) 87'; Aspas 90+1'	Stadium: Mendizorrotza; Attendance: 19,437; Referee: Juan Martínez Munuera

11 February 2018 23	Celta Vigo	2–2	Espanyol	Vigo
18:30 CET (UTC+01:00)	M. Gómez 32', 80', (yellow card) 90+2'; Hernández (yellow card) 78'; Mallo (yellow card) 85'	Report	Baptistão 10'; Sánchez (yellow card) 45'; López (yellow card) 54'; Navarro (yellow card) 83'; Gerard 87'; García (yellow card) 90'	Stadium: Balaídos; Attendance: 15,649; Referee: José Luis González González

19 February 2018 24	Getafe	3–0	Celta Vigo	Getafe
21:00 CET (UTC+01:00)	Suárez (yellow card) 10'; Cabrera (yellow card) 23'; Ángel 37', 85'; Molina 51'; Portillo (yellow card) 60'; Fajr (yellow card) 87'	Report	Roncaglia (yellow card) 63'; Boyé (yellow card) 79'; Mor (yellow card) 81'	Stadium: Coliseum Alfonso Pérez; Attendance: 8,367; Referee: Pablo González Fuertes

24 February 2018 25	Celta Vigo	2–0	Eibar	Vigo
13:00 CET (UTC+01:00)	Radoja (yellow card) 38'; Cabral (yellow card) 39'; Aspas 56'; M. Gómez 79'	Report	Diop (yellow card) 12'; José Ángel (yellow card) 37'; Oliveira (yellow card) 80'	Stadium: Balaídos; Attendance: 15,383; Referee: Carlos del Cerro Grande

27 February 2018 26	Girona	1–0	Celta Vigo	Girona
21:30 CET (UTC+01:00)	Portu 14'; Maffeo (yellow card) 26'; Stuani (yellow card) 53'; A. García (yellow card) 86'	Report	Jonny (yellow card) 60'; Mor (yellow card) 80'	Stadium: Montilivi; Attendance: 6,392; Referee: Daniel Jesús Trujillo Suárez

5 March 2018 27	Celta Vigo	2–1	Las Palmas	Vigo
21:00 CET (UTC+01:00)	Jonny 62'; Lobotka (yellow card) 81'; Hernández 89'	Report	Aquilani (yellow card) 18'; Expósito 53'; Navarro (yellow card) 72'	Stadium: Balaídos; Attendance: 11,276; Referee: Ricardo de Burgos Bengoetxea

11 March 2018 28	Atlético Madrid	3–0	Celta Vigo	Madrid
16:15 CET (UTC+01:00)	Griezmann 44'; Saúl (yellow card) 48'; Vitolo 56'; Correa 63'	Report	Aspas (yellow card) 49'; S. Gómez (yellow card) 51'	Stadium: Wanda Metropolitano; Attendance: 55,076; Referee: Javier Alberola Rojas

18 March 2018 29	Celta Vigo	0–0	Málaga	Vigo
18:30 CET (UTC+01:00)	Aspas (yellow card) 45'; Mallo (yellow card) 57'; Jonny (yellow card) 61'	Report	Rosales (yellow card) 42'; Torres (yellow card) 45'	Stadium: Balaídos; Attendance: 17,230; Referee: Alberto Undiano Mallenco

31 March 2018 30	Athletic Bilbao	1–1	Celta Vigo	Bilbao
16:15 CEST (UTC+02:00)	Williams (yellow card) 31'; I. Martínez (yellow card) 44'; Núñez 55', (yellow card) 90+2'	Report	M. Gómez (yellow card) 15'; Méndez 90+1'	Stadium: San Mamés; Attendance: 33,657; Referee: Carlos del Cerro Grande

8 April 2018 31	Celta Vigo	4–0	Sevilla	Vigo
16:15 CEST (UTC+02:00)	Jonny (yellow card) 12'; Arana 38' (o.g.); Aspas 57', 60', 78'	Report	Pizarro (yellow card) 21'; Banega (yellow card) 82'	Stadium: Balaídos; Attendance: 16,919; Referee: Alfonso Javier Álvarez Izquierdo

15 April 2018 32	Leganés	1–0	Celta Vigo	Leganés
18:30 CEST (UTC+02:00)	Guerrero 63'; Rico (yellow card) 83'; Gumbau (yellow card) 88'; Cuéllar (yellow card) 90+3'	Report	Hernández (yellow card) 59'; Mor (yellow card) 80'; Mallo (yellow card) 87'	Stadium: Butarque; Attendance: 10,393; Referee: Alejandro Hernández Hernández

17 April 2018 33	Celta Vigo	2–2	Barcelona	Vigo
21:00 CEST (UTC+02:00)	Jonny 45', (yellow card) 88'; Aspas (yellow card) 56', (goal) 82'; Wass (yellow card) 78'	Report	Dembélé 36'; Alcácer 64'; Roberto (red card) 71'	Stadium: Balaídos; Attendance: 20,347; Referee: David Fernández Borbalán

21 April 2018 34	Celta Vigo	1–1	Valencia	Vigo
16:15 CEST (UTC+02:00)	S. Gómez (yellow card) 43'; M. Gómez 63'	Report	Mina 59'; Vezo (yellow card) 62'; Garay (yellow card) 90'	Stadium: Balaídos; Attendance: 17,316; Referee: Alberto Undiano Mallenco

28 April 2018 35	Villarreal	4–1	Celta Vigo	Villarreal
20:45 CEST (UTC+02:00)	Bacca 13', 35', 38'; Trigueros (yellow card) 56'; Castillejo (yellow card) 64', (goal) 90+3'	Report	Sisto 34'	Stadium: La Cerámica; Attendance: 14,135; Referee: Javier Alberola Rojas

5 May 2018 36	Celta Vigo	1–1	Deportivo La Coruña	Vigo
18:30 CEST (UTC+02:00)	M. Gómez 13', (yellow card) 54'; Mallo (yellow card) 56'; Boyé (yellow card) 66'; Sisto (yellow card) 71'	Report	Luisinho (yellow card) 6'; Schär (yellow card) 56'; Pérez 90+1'	Stadium: Balaídos; Attendance: 20,816; Referee: Carlos del Cerro Grande

13 May 2018 37	Real Madrid	6–0	Celta Vigo	Madrid
20:45 CEST (UTC+02:00)	Bale 13', 30'; Isco 42'; Hakimi 52'; S. Gómez 74' (o.g.); Kroos 81'	Report	Mallo (yellow card) 84'	Stadium: Santiago Bernabéu; Attendance: 56,474; Referee: Pablo González Fuertes

19 May 2018 38	Celta Vigo	4–2	Levante	Vigo
13:00 CEST (UTC+02:00)	M. Gómez 29', 63', (yellow card) 89'; Aspas 41', 48'	Report	Rochina 12'; Cabaco (yellow card) 22'; Luna (yellow card) 35'; Morales 74'	Stadium: Balaídos; Attendance: 10,480; Referee: Ricardo de Burgos Bengoetxea

=== Copa del Rey ===
==== Matches ====
Win Draw Loss

===== Round of 32 =====
25 October 2017 First leg	Eibar	1–2	Celta Vigo	Eibar
21:30 CEST (UTC+02:00)	Oliveira (yellow card) 3'; Lombán (yellow card) 16'; Enrich 18'; Sarriegi (yellow card) 25'	Report	Cabral 4'; Guidetti 44'	Stadium: Ipurua; Attendance: 3,432; Referee: Alberto Undiano Mallenco

29 November 2017 Second leg	Celta Vigo	1–0 (3–1 agg.)	Eibar	Vigo
21:30 CET (UTC+01:00)	Aspas 90' (pen.)	Report	Jordán (yellow card) 56'; Gálvez (yellow card) 71'	Stadium: Balaídos; Attendance: 8,286; Referee: Xavier Estrada Fernández

===== Round of 16 =====
3 January 2018 First leg	Celta Vigo	1–1	Barcelona	Vigo
19:00 CET (UTC+01:00)	Fontàs (yellow card) 26'; Sisto 31'	Report	Arnaiz 15'; Gomes (yellow card) 64'	Stadium: Balaídos; Attendance: 21,338; Referee: Juan Martínez Munuera

10 January 2018 Second leg	Barcelona	5–0 (6–1 agg.)	Celta Vigo	Barcelona
	Messi 13', 15'; Alba 28'; L. Suárez 31'; Rakitić 87'	Report		Stadium: Camp Nou; Attendance: 59,009; Referee: Alejandro Hernández Hernández

== Statistics ==
=== Appearances and goals ===
Last updated on 19 May 2018.

No.	Pos	Nat	Player	Total		La Liga		Copa del Rey	
No.	Pos	Nat	Player	Apps	Goals	Apps	Goals	Apps	Goals
Goalkeepers
1	GK	(Spain) ESP	Sergio Álvarez	21	0	16+1	0	4	0
13	GK	(Spain) ESP	Rubén Blanco	22	0	22	0	0	0
Defenders
2	DF	(Spain) ESP	Hugo Mallo	38	0	34	0	4	0
3	DF	(Spain) ESP	Andreu Fontàs	16	0	9+3	0	4	0
15	DF	(Slovakia) SVK	Róbert Mazáň	3	0	1+1	0	0+1	0
19	DF	(Spain) ESP	Jonny	40	2	36	2	4	0
20	DF	(Spain) ESP	Sergi Gómez	35	1	31+2	1	2	0
22	DF	(Argentina) ARG	Gustavo Cabral	28	2	20+6	1	2	1
24	DF	(Argentina) ARG	Facundo Roncaglia	22	0	17+4	0	0+1	0
Midfielders
6	MF	(Serbia) SRB	Nemanja Radoja	29	0	11+15	0	2+1	0
8	MF	(Chile) CHI	Pablo Hernández	32	3	18+12	3	1+1	0
11	MF	(Denmark) DEN	Pione Sisto	36	6	31+3	5	2	1
14	MF	(Slovakia) SVK	Stanislav Lobotka	41	0	34+4	0	2+1	0
16	MF	(Spain) ESP	Jozabed	27	0	18+6	0	3	0
18	MF	(Denmark) DEN	Daniel Wass	39	4	34+1	4	2+2	0
26	MF	(Spain) ESP	Brais Méndez	24	1	12+8	1	2+2	0
Forwards
7	FW	(Uruguay) URU	Maxi Gómez	39	17	35+1	17	1+2	0
9	FW	(Argentina) ARG	Lucas Boyé	13	0	2+11	0	0	0
10	FW	(Spain) ESP	Iago Aspas	37	23	33+1	22	2+1	1
21	FW	(Turkey) TUR	Emre Mor	27	1	4+19	1	3+1	0
Players who have made an appearance or had a squad number this season but have left the club
4	DF	(Spain) ESP	David Costas	0	0	0	0	0	0
5	MF	(Spain) ESP	Pape Cheikh Diop	0	0	0	0	0	0
9	FW	(Sweden) SWE	John Guidetti	10	1	0+8	0	2	1
12	FW	(Guadeloupe) GLP	Claudio Beauvue	0	0	0	0	0	0
17	MF	(Denmark) DEN	Andrew Hjulsager	4	0	0+2	0	2	0
27	GK	(Spain) ESP	Iván Villar	0	0	0	0	0	0
—	MF	(Serbia) SRB	Dejan Dražić	0	0	0	0	0	0

=== Cards ===
Accounts for all competitions. Last updated on 19 December 2017.

No.	Pos.	Name	Yellow card	Red card
2	DF	(Spain) Hugo Mallo	5	0
3	DF	(Spain) Andreu Fontàs	2	0
6	MF	(Serbia) Nemanja Radoja	1	0
7	FW	(Uruguay) Maxi Gómez	7	0
8	MF	(Chile) Pablo Hernández	2	0
10	FW	(Spain) Iago Aspas	5	0
11	MF	(Denmark) Pione Sisto	1	0
13	GK	(Spain) Rubén Blanco	2	1
16	MF	(Spain) Jozabed	6	0
18	MF	(Denmark) Daniel Wass	1	0
19	DF	(Spain) Jonny	5	0
21	FW	(Turkey) Emre Mor	1	0
22	DF	(Argentina) Gustavo Cabral	4	0
24	DF	(Argentina) Facundo Roncaglia	1	0

=== Clean sheets ===
Last updated on 19 December 2017.

Number	Nation	Name	Matches Played	La Liga	Copa del Rey	Total
1	(Spain)	Sergio Álvarez	9	1	1	2
13	(Spain)	Rubén Blanco	10	2	0	2
27	(Spain)	Iván Villar	0	0	0	0
TOTALS				3	1	4
