= 2012–13 División de Honor Juvenil de Fútbol =

División de Honor Juvenil de Fútbol
- Season: 2012–13

The 2012–13 División de Honor Juvenil de Fútbol season is the 27th since its establishment. The regular season began on September 1, 2012, and ended on April 20, 2013. The Copa de Campeones begins in the week of May 5, 2013 and the Copa del Rey the week of May 19.

== Regular season ==
=== Group 1 ===
Pos	Team	Pld	W	D	L	GF	GA	GD	Pts	Qualification or relegation
1	RC Celta	30	25	4	1	102	28	+74	79	Copa de Campeones
2	Real Sporting	30	18	7	5	71	30	+41	61	Copa del Rey
3	RC Deportivo	30	19	4	7	62	26	+36	61	Copa del Rey
4	Real Oviedo	30	14	7	9	61	47	+14	49	
5	Pabellón Ourense CF	30	12	9	9	42	40	+2	45	
6	Real Racing Club	30	15	0	15	55	53	+2	45	
7	CD Lugo	30	11	6	13	44	53	−9	39	
8	Veriña CF	30	10	8	12	43	57	−14	38	
9	RS Gimnástica	30	9	9	12	31	42	−11	36	
10	Pontevedra CF	30	10	6	14	44	56	−12	36	
11	CD Roces	30	9	9	12	37	40	−3	36	
12	Atlético Perines	30	9	8	13	54	65	−11	35	
13	CD Laredo	30	8	6	16	30	58	−28	30	Relegation
14	Montañeros CF	30	7	8	15	26	42	−16	29	Relegation
15	Rayo Cantabria	30	7	5	18	34	66	−32	26	Relegation
16	Santiago de Compostela CF	30	7	4	19	42	75	−33	25	Relegation

=== Group 2 ===
Pos	Team	Pld	W	D	L	GF	GA	GD	Pts	Qualification or relegation
1	Athletic Club	30	21	6	3	81	27	+54	69	Copa de Campeones
2	Club Atlético Osasuna	30	19	3	8	63	30	+33	60	Copa del Rey
3	SD Eibar	30	16	7	7	64	48	+16	55	
4	Real Sociedad de Fútbol	30	13	7	10	55	39	+16	46	
5	Antiguoko KE	30	14	3	13	47	48	−1	45	
6	CD Numancia	30	12	8	10	36	40	−4	44	
7	CD Berceo	30	13	5	12	41	42	−1	44	
8	AD San Juan	30	11	11	8	32	33	−1	44	
9	UDC Txantrea KKE	30	10	9	11	49	51	−2	39	
10	Danok Bat CF	30	11	5	14	45	36	+9	38	
11	SCD Durango	30	10	7	13	52	62	−10	37	
12	Deportivo Alavés	30	8	12	10	36	36	0	36	
13	Santutxu FC	30	8	11	11	30	41	−11	35	Relegation
14	CD Aurrera de Vitoria	30	9	7	14	46	54	−8	34	Relegation
15	CD Pamplona	30	5	9	16	30	63	−33	24	Relegation
16	CF Comillas	30	5	0	25	23	80	−57	15	Relegation

=== Group 3 ===
Pos	Team	Pld	W	D	L	GF	GA	GD	Pts	Qualification or relegation
1	FC Barcelona	30	26	3	1	93	18	+75	81	Copa de Campeones
2	RCD Mallorca	30	18	5	7	71	36	+35	59	Copa del Rey
3	RCD Espanyol	30	18	5	7	64	34	+30	59	
4	Real Zaragoza	30	16	5	9	64	37	+27	53	
5	Girona FC	30	15	6	9	58	43	+15	51	
6	CF Badalona	30	14	9	7	49	37	+12	51	
7	Gimnàstic de Tarragona	30	14	7	9	57	51	+6	49	
8	UD Cornellà	30	13	6	11	54	42	+12	45	
9	UE Sant Andreu	30	11	10	9	50	47	+3	43	
10	CF Damm	30	13	4	13	48	47	+1	43	
11	CD Menorca	30	9	4	17	49	70	−21	31	
12	CD San Francisco	30	7	8	15	36	56	−20	29	
13	AD Stadium Casablanca	30	7	5	18	38	79	−41	26	Relegation
14	CF Gavà	30	6	4	20	40	71	−31	22	Relegation
15	FPE Mataró	30	6	3	21	25	73	−48	21	Relegation
16	AEC Manlleu	30	3	4	23	29	84	−55	13	Relegation

=== Group 4 ===
Pos	Team	Pld	W	D	L	GF	GA	GD	Pts	Qualification or relegation
1	Sevilla FC	30	21	8	1	73	18	+55	71	Copa de Campeones
2	Málaga CF	30	20	9	1	70	26	+44	69	Copa del Rey
3	UD Almería	30	20	6	4	72	32	+40	66	Copa del Rey
4	Real Betis Balompié	30	14	9	7	53	32	+21	51	
5	RC Recreativo	30	12	6	12	39	34	+5	42	
6	Xerez CD	30	11	8	11	42	52	−10	41	
7	Granada CF	30	11	6	13	38	55	−17	39	
8	Los Molinos CF	30	9	10	11	35	52	−17	37	
9	Puerto Malagueño GI	30	10	6	14	35	40	−5	36	
10	CD Santa Fe	30	9	9	12	42	46	−4	36	
11	Coria CF	30	9	8	13	44	50	−6	35	
12	ADP Sevilla Este	30	9	8	13	35	45	−10	35	
13	Córdoba CF	30	8	8	14	34	51	−17	32	Relegation
14	UD Maracena	30	7	6	17	26	55	−29	27	Relegation
15	Séneca CF	30	6	6	18	30	52	−22	24	Relegation
16	AD Nervión	30	6	3	21	36	64	−28	21	Relegation

=== Group 5 ===
Pos	Team	Pld	W	D	L	GF	GA	GD	Pts	Qualification or relegation
1	Real Madrid CF	30	27	2	1	105	16	+89	83	Copa de Campeones
2	Club Atlético de Madrid	30	23	3	4	78	32	+46	72	Copa de Campeones
3	Rayo Vallecano	30	19	3	8	68	36	+32	60	
4	Getafe CF	30	16	6	8	65	33	+32	54	
5	AD Alcorcón	30	12	8	10	51	47	+4	44	
6	AD Unión Adarve	30	12	5	13	48	47	+1	41	
7	CF Rayo Majadahonda	30	11	7	12	46	53	−7	40	
8	Real Valladolid CF	30	11	7	12	55	47	+8	40	
9	UD Talavera	30	11	6	13	39	61	−22	39	
10	UP Plasencia	30	12	2	16	56	55	+1	38	
11	CD Leganés	30	8	11	11	40	52	−12	35	
12	CD Diocesano	30	9	7	14	41	55	−14	34	
13	UD Santa Marta de Tormes	30	9	4	17	42	68	−26	31	Relegation
14	Las Rozas CF	30	9	3	18	40	57	−17	30	Relegation
15	Alcobendas CF	30	8	3	19	34	70	−36	27	Relegation
16	UD Salamanca	30	2	5	23	21	100	−79	11	Relegation

=== Group 6 ===
Pos	Team	Pld	W	D	L	GF	GA	GD	Pts	Qualification or relegation
1	UD Las Palmas	30	22	7	1	82	17	+65	73	Copa de Campeones
2	CD Tenerife	30	19	7	4	85	32	+53	64	Copa del Rey
3	Acodetti CF	30	15	9	6	47	29	+18	54	
4	UD Vecindario	30	15	6	9	45	31	+14	51	
5	CD Sobradillo	30	12	9	9	55	39	+16	45	
6	AD Huracán	30	12	9	9	59	46	+13	45	
7	CD Laguna	30	11	5	14	37	38	−1	38	
8	CD Puerto Cruz	30	10	8	12	39	57	−18	38	
9	UD Telde	30	11	4	15	36	49	−13	37	
10	Unión Viera CF	30	9	10	11	37	45	−8	37	
11	CD Tahíche	30	11	4	15	40	51	−11	37	
12	SD Tenisca	30	10	6	14	41	56	−15	36	
13	CF Barrio del Atlántico	30	10	6	14	27	44	−17	36	Relegation
14	UD Ibarra	30	9	7	14	45	52	−7	34	Relegation
15	CEF Puertos Las Palmas	30	9	3	18	38	59	−21	30	Relegation
16	CD Teguise	30	2	6	22	18	86	−68	12	Relegation

=== Group 7 ===
Pos	Team	Pld	W	D	L	GF	GA	GD	Pts	Qualification or relegation
1	Villarreal CF	30	22	6	2	69	28	+41	72	Copa de Campeones
2	Levante UD	30	22	6	2	57	22	+35	72	Copa del Rey
3	Valencia CF	30	17	5	8	60	27	+33	56	
4	CD Roda	30	15	5	10	58	45	+13	50	
5	Real Murcia CF	30	15	5	10	39	31	+8	50	
6	Huracán Valencia CF	30	13	6	11	44	37	+7	45	
7	Albacete Balompié	30	10	10	10	42	43	−1	40	
8	CD Castellón	30	11	6	13	50	49	+1	39	
9	Atlético Madrileño CF	30	11	4	15	43	46	−3	37	
10	Elche CF	30	9	9	12	38	40	−2	36	
11	CD Alcoyano	30	9	9	12	35	46	−11	36	
12	CF Torre Levante	30	10	5	15	32	45	−13	35	
13	EF Los Alcázares	30	8	8	14	37	55	−18	32	Relegation
14	CF Crack´s	30	7	8	15	36	56	−20	29	Relegation
15	Hércules CF	30	4	8	18	25	51	−26	20	Relegation
16	CD Oliver	30	5	4	21	33	77	−44	19	Relegation

== Copa de Campeones ==
=== Bracket ===
First Round
VI	UD Las Palmas	2
V	FC Barcelona	0
Group A
II	Athletic Bilbao	1
IV	Sevilla FC	2
WC	Atlético Madrid	0
VII	Villarreal CF	1
Group B
I	Celta de Vigo	4
V	Real Madrid C.F.	1

Second Round
VI	UD Las Palmas	1
IV	Sevilla FC	2
VII	Villarreal CF	1
I	Celta de Vigo'	4

Final
IV	Sevilla FC	3
I	Celta de Vigo	2

=== Group A ===
==== 1st round ====
Team 1	Score	Team 2
UD Las Palmas	2 – 0	FC Barcelona
Athletic Bilbao	1 – 2	Sevilla FC

6 May 2013

UD Las Palmas	2 – 0	FC Barcelona
	Report

A Madroa

6 May 2013

Athletic Bilbao	1 – 2	Sevilla FC
	Report

A Madroa

==== 2nd round ====
Team 1	Score	Team 2
UD Las Palmas	1 – 2	Sevilla FC

9 May 2013

UD Las Palmas	1 – 2	Sevilla FC
	Report

Balaídos

=== Group B ===
==== 1st round ====
Team 1	Score	Team 2
Atlético Madrid	0 – 1	Villarreal CF
Celta de Vigo	4 –1	Real Madrid C.F.

6 May 2013

Atlético Madrid	0 - 1	Villarreal CF
	Report	Álvaro Fernández 8'

A Madroa
Referee: Miguel Ángel Pérez Cabaleiro

6 May 2013

Celta de Vigo	4 - 1	Real Madrid C.F.
Mina 2', 14'; Pablo Pérez 35'; Fernán 49'	Report	De Tomás 42' (pen.)

A Madroa
Referee: Antonio Loira

==== 2nd round ====
Team 1	Score	Team 2
Villarreal CF	1 – 4	Celta de Vigo

9 May 2013

Villarreal CF	1 - 4	Celta de Vigo
Cifuentes 45' (pen.)	Report	Mina 2' (pen.); Jordan 35'; Thaylor 65'; Berto 90'

Balaídos
Referee: Vidal Araujo

=== Final ===
Team 1	Score	Team 2
Sevilla FC	3 – 2	Celta de Vigo

Copa de Campeones
winners
Sevilla FC

==== Details ====
11 May 2013
16:00

Sevilla FC	3 - 2	Celta de Vigo
Pavón 11' (pen.); Carlos Fernández 48'; Juanje 89'	Report	Mina 80' (pen.), 90+2'

Balaídos
Attendance: 4,000
Referee: Carlos López Rodríguez

Sevilla	Celta

SEVILLA:
GK	(Spain) Churripi
DF	(Spain) Modesto	Booked
DF	(Spain) Carlos Garrido	Booked
DF	(Spain) Juanlu (c)
DF	(Spain) José Joaquín Matos
MF	(Spain) Antonio	Booked	(substituted off) 52'
MF	(Spain) Borja Lasso	Booked	(substituted off) 84'
MF	(Spain) Curro	Booked
FW	(Spain) José Manuel Pavón		(substituted off) 90'
FW	(Spain) Carlos Fernández		(substituted off) 57'
FW	(Spain) Abel Moreno		(substituted off) 69'
Substitutes:
GK	(Spain) Ángel de la Calzada
MF	(Spain) Juanje		(substituted in) 57'
MF	(Spain) Miguel Girón		(substituted in) 52'
MF	(Guinea-Bissau) Beto		(substituted in) 84'
FW	(Spain) Juan Muñoz		(substituted in) 69'
FW	(Spain) Javier Falcón		(substituted in) 90'
Manager: (Spain) Agustín López

CELTA:
GK	(Spain) Yago Novoa
DF	(Spain) Pablo Pérez	Booked	(substituted off) 53'
DF	(Spain) David Costas (c)
DF	(Spain) Borja Fernández
DF	(Spain) Alberto Rey		(substituted off) 53'
MF	(Angola) Thaylor Lubanzadio		(substituted off) 53'
MF	(Spain) Álvaro Casas		(substituted off) 53'
MF	(Spain) Jordan Domínguez
MF	(Spain) Yelko Pino	Booked
FW	(Spain) Santi Mina
FW	(Spain) José Luis Varela	Booked	(substituted off) 77'
Substitutes:
GK	(Spain) Alex Arias
DF	(Spain) Migui		(substituted in) 53'
DF	(Spain) Samu Araújo		(substituted in) 53'
MF	(Spain) Fernán Ferreiroá
MF	(Spain) David Goldar		(substituted in) 53'
FW	(Spain) Oki	Booked	(substituted in) 77'
FW	(Spain) Berto		(substituted in) 53'
Manager: (Spain) David de Dios

== See also ==
- 2013 Copa del Rey Juvenil
