= 2014–15 Celta de Vigo season =

Celta de Vigo
2014–15 season
- President: Carlos Mouriño
- Head coach: Eduardo Berizzo
- Stadium: Balaídos
- La Liga: 8th
- Copa del Rey: Round of 16
- Top goalscorer: League: Nolito (13); All: Nolito (13)
Home colours	Away colours	Third colours

The 2014–15 Celta de Vigo season was the club's 91st season in its history and its 49th in the top-tier.

== Squad ==
=== Current squad ===
As of 1 September 2014

Note: Flags indicate national team as defined under FIFA eligibility rules; some limited exceptions apply. Players may hold more than one non-FIFA nationality.

No.	Pos.	Nation	Player
1	GK	ESP	Sergio Álvarez
2	DF	ESP	Hugo Mallo
3	DF	ESP	Andreu Fontàs
4	MF	ESP	Borja Oubiña (captain)
5	MF	CHI	Pablo Hernández
6	MF	SRB	Nemanja Radoja
7	FW	ESP	Santi Mina
8	MF	ESP	Álex López
9	FW	BRA	Charles
10	MF	ESP	Nolito
11	FW	ARG	Joaquín Larrivey

No.	Pos.	Nation	Player
13	GK	ESP	Rubén Blanco
14	MF	CHI	Fabián Orellana
15	DF	ESP	David Costas
17	MF	GAB	Lévy Madinda
19	DF	ESP	Jonny
20	DF	ESP	Sergi Gómez
21	DF	ESP	Carles Planas
22	DF	ARG	Gustavo Cabral
23	MF	DEN	Michael Krohn-Dehli
24	MF	ARG	Augusto Fernández
28	MF	ESP	Borja Fernández

=== Out on loan ===
Note: Flags indicate national team as defined under FIFA eligibility rules; some limited exceptions apply. Players may hold more than one non-FIFA nationality.

No.	Pos.	Nation	Player
—	GK	ESP	Yoel (at Valencia until 30 June 2015)
—	DF	ESP	Samuel Llorca (at Valladolid until 30 June 2015)

=== Transfers ===
In:

No.	Pos.	Nation	Player
20	DF	ESP	Sergi Gómez (from Barcelona B)
5	MF	CHI	Pablo Hernández (from O'Higgins)
11	FW	ARG	Joaquín Larrivey (from Rayo Vallecano)
18	DF	ESP	Carles Planas (from Barcelona B)
6	MF	SRB	Nemanja Radoja (from Vojvodina)

Out:

No.	Pos.	Nation	Player
—	MF	BRA	Rafinha (loan return to Barcelona)
—	FW	ESP	Mario Bermejo (retired)
—	DF	ESP	Íñigo López (loan return to PAOK, later signed by Córdoba)
—	GK	ESP	Yoel (on loan to Valencia)

== Competitions ==
=== Overall ===
Competition	Started round	Final position / round	First match	Last match
La Liga	—	8th	24 August 2014	23 May 2015
Copa del Rey	Round of 32	Round of 16	2 December 2014	14 January 2015

Updated to match played June 2014
Source: Competitions

=== La Liga ===
==== League table ====
Pos	Team	Pld	W	D	L	GF	GA	GD	Pts	Qualification or relegation
6	Villarreal	38	16	12	10	48	37	+11	60	Qualification for the Europa League group stage (Note: Since the winners of the 2014–15 Copa del Rey, Barcelona, qualified for European competition based on league position, the spot awarded to the cup winners (Europa League group stage) was passed to the sixth-placed team, and the spot awarded to the sixth-placed team (Europa League third qualifying round) was passed to the seventh-placed team.)
7	Athletic Bilbao	38	15	10	13	42	41	+1	55	Qualification for the Europa League third qualifying round
8	Celta Vigo	38	13	12	13	47	44	+3	51	
9	Málaga	38	14	8	16	42	48	−6	50	
10	Espanyol	38	13	10	15	47	51	−4	49 (Note: Espanyol ahead on head-to-head record; Rayo Vallecano–Espanyol 1–3, Espanyol–Rayo Vallecano 1–1.)	

Source: La Liga
Rules for classification: 1) points; 2) head-to-head points; 3) head-to-head goal difference; 4) goal difference; 5) number of goals scored; 6) fair-play points; 7) playoff match

==== Results summary ====
Overall								Home						Away					
Pld	W	D	L	GF	GA	GD	Pts	W	D	L	GF	GA	GD	W	D	L	GF	GA	GD
38	13	12	13	47	44	+3	51	8	5	6	30	22	+8	5	7	7	17	22	−5

Last updated: 23 May 2015.
Source: Competitive matches

==== Results by round ====
Round	1	2	3	4	5	6	7	8	9	10	11	12	13	14	15	16	17	18	19	20	21	22	23	24	25	26	27	28	29	30	31	32	33	34	35	36	37	38
Ground	H	A	H	A	H	A	H	A	H	A	H	A	H	A	A	H	A	H	A	A	H	A	H	A	H	A	H	A	H	A	H	A	H	H	A	H	A	H
Result	W	D	D	D	W	W	L	D	W	W	D	L	L	L	L	L	L	D	L	L	W	D	W	W	D	L	L	W	L	D	W	W	L	W	D	D	D	W
Position	2	3	5	8	6	6	6	7	6	6	7	7	9	9	9	9	9	9	11	11	10	10	8	8	9	10	10	10	11	11	8	8	8	8	8	8	8	8

Updated to match(es) played on 23 May 2015. Source:
A = Away; H = Home; W = Win; D = Draw; L = Loss

==== Matches ====
Kickoff times are in CET. Win Draw Loss

24 August 2014 1	Celta Vigo	3–1	Getafe	Vigo
21:00	Nolito 20', (yellow card) 34'; Jonny (yellow card) 31'; Planas (yellow card) 43'; Orellana 56', (yellow card) 68'; Larrivey 70'	Report	Alexis (yellow card) 45+1'; Sammir 62'	Stadium: Balaídos; Attendance: 20,416; Referee: Mario Melero López

30 August 2014 2	Córdoba	1–1	Celta Vigo	Córdoba
19:00	Cartabia 60'; Ekeng (yellow card) 75'	Report	Jonny (yellow card) 22'; Radoja (yellow card) 50'; Orellana 52'; Fernández (yellow card) 81'	Stadium: Nuevo Arcángel; Attendance: 15,982; Referee: José Antonio Teixeira Vitienes

13 September 2014 3	Celta Vigo	2–2	Real Sociedad	Vigo
22:00	Orellana 28'; Larrivey 48'; Nolito (yellow card) 90+1'	Report	Canales (yellow card) 17'; Zaldúa (yellow card) 31'; Granero (yellow card) 57'; Agirretxe 69', (yellow card) 77'; Bergara (yellow card) 74'; Jonny 90+2' (o.g.)	Stadium: Balaídos; Attendance: 19,385; Referee: Alejandro Hernández Hernández

20 September 2014 4	Atlético Madrid	2–2	Celta Vigo	Madrid
20:00	Miranda 31'; Godín 41'	Report	Hernández 19'; Nolito 53' (pen.)	Stadium: Vicente Calderón; Referee: Juan Martínez Munuera

23 September 2014 5	Celta Vigo	2–1	Deportivo La Coruña	Vigo
22:00	Nolito 3'; Orellana 72'	Report	Cuenca 55'	Stadium: Balaídos; Referee: Carlos del Cerro Grande

26 September 2014 6	Elche	0–1	Celta Vigo	Elche
21:00	Jonathas (yellow card) 18'; Rodrigues (yellow card) 59'; Lombán (yellow card) 61'; Adrián (yellow card) 87'	Report	Radoja (yellow card) 52'; Gómez (yellow card) 64'; Nolito 90'	Stadium: Martínez Valero; Attendance: 20,852; Referee: Pedro Pérez Montero

5 October 2014 7	Celta Vigo	1–3	Villarreal	Vigo
17:00	Fontàs (yellow card) 26' (yellow-red card) 86'; Larrivey 44'; Krohn-Dehli (yellow card) 70'; Orellana (yellow card) 83'; Madinda (yellow card) 89'	Report	Gómez 32', 33', (yellow card) 57'; Marín (yellow card) 35'; Gabriel (yellow card) 50'; Cani (yellow card) 90'; Mario 90+1'	Stadium: Balaídos; Attendance: 23,000; Referee: Alfonso Álvarez Izquierdo

18 October 2014 8	Athletic Bilbao	1–1	Celta Vigo	Bilbao
17:00	Aduriz 6' (pen.); Muniain (yellow card) 56'; Iraola (yellow card) 62'; Iturraspe (yellow card) 88'	Report	Orellana (yellow card) 7'; Planas (yellow card) 65'; Nolito 73'; Charles (yellow card) 78'	Stadium: San Mamés; Attendance: 35,600; Referee: David Fernández Borbalán

24 October 2014 9	Celta Vigo	3–0	Levante	Vigo
20:00	Larrivey 27', 83'; Á. López 90'	Report	Xumetra (yellow card) 59'; Simão Mate (yellow card) 67'; P. López (yellow card) 73'	Stadium: Balaídos; Attendance: 19,231; Referee: Fernando Teixeira Vitienes

1 November 2014 10	Barcelona	0–1	Celta Vigo	Barcelona
20:00	July (yellow card) 90+3'	Report	Hernández (yellow card) 14'; Larrivey 55'; Gómez (yellow card) 72'	Stadium: Camp Nou; Attendance: 71,468; Referee: Iñaki Vicandi Garrido

8 November 2014 11	Celta Vigo	0–0	Granada	Vigo
22:00	Orellana (yellow card) 16'	Report	Fernández (yellow card) 36'; Iturra (yellow card) 36'; Juan Carlos (yellow card) 58'; Rico (yellow card) 60'; Nyom (yellow card) 72'	Stadium: Balaídos; Attendance: 20,000; Referee: Xavier Estrada Fernández

23 November 2014 12	Rayo Vallecano	1–0	Celta Vigo	Madrid
12:00 CET	Bueno 20'; Nacho (yellow card) 27'; Trashorras (yellow card) 42'; Licá (yellow card) 44'; Tito (yellow card) 51'; Baena (yellow card) 77'; Álvarez (yellow card) 90+2'	Summary	Orellana (yellow card) 24'; Gabral (yellow card) 27'; Nolito (yellow card) 45+2'; Charles (yellow card) 88'	Stadium: Campo de Vallecas; Attendance: 7,100; Referee: José González González

29 November 2014 13	Celta Vigo	0–1	Eibar	Vigo
22:00 CET	Larrivey (yellow card) 32'; López (yellow card) 60'; Fontàs (yellow card) 80'; Fernández (yellow card) 82'	Summary	Saúl (yellow card) 10'; Manu 30', (yellow card) 80'; Capa (yellow card) 59'; Lillo (yellow card) 69'; Abraham (yellow card) 70'	Stadium: Balaídos; Attendance: 16,000; Referee: Pedro Pérez Montero

6 December 2014 14	Real Madrid	3–0	Celta Vigo	Madrid
20:00	Ronaldo 36' (pen.), 65', 81'; Rodríguez (yellow card) 38'; Carvajal (yellow card) 75'; Arbeloa (yellow card) 79'; Ramos (yellow card) 87'	Report	Cabral (yellow card) 11'; Jonny (yellow card) 35'; Nolito (yellow card) 35'; Hernández (yellow card) 77'	Stadium: Santiago Bernabéu; Attendance: 80,300; Referee: Alberto Undiano Mallenco

13 December 2014 15	Málaga	1–0	Celta Vigo	Málaga
22:00 CET	Samu 21', (yellow card) 90'; Rosales (yellow card) 24'; Weligton (yellow card) 47'; Camacho (yellow card) 52'; Recio (yellow card) 86'	Report	Fontàs (yellow card) 30'; Charles (yellow card) 42'; Mallo (yellow card) 55'; Fernández (yellow card) 64'	Stadium: La Rosaleda; Attendance: 27,000; Referee: Carlos del Cerro Grande

19 December 2014 16	Celta Vigo	0–1	Almería	Vigo
20:45	Fernández (yellow card) 34'; Charles (yellow card) 45+1'; Mina (yellow card) 50'; Fontàs (yellow card) 90'; Orellana (yellow card) 90'; Nolito (yellow card) 90'	Report	Hemed 17', (yellow card) 43'; Navarro (yellow card) 38'; Cuesta (yellow card) 88'; Durbarbier (yellow card) 90+5'	Stadium: Balaídos; Attendance: 13,200; Referee: Jesús Gil Manzano

3 January 2015 17	Sevilla	1–0	Celta Vigo	Seville
18:00 CET	Vitolo (yellow card) 20'; Pareja 32'; Reyes (yellow card) 45'; Carriço (yellow card) 45+1'; Krcychowiak (yellow card) 45+1'	Report	Cabral (yellow card) 21'; Planas (red card) 21'; Mallo (yellow card) 31'; Mina (yellow card) 58'; Krohn-Dehli (yellow card) 75'; Orellana (yellow card) 79'	Stadium: Ramón Sánchez Pizjuán; Attendance: 31,253; Referee: Carlos Velasco Carballo

10 January 2015 18	Celta Vigo	1–1	Valencia	Vigo
20:00 CET	Charles (yellow card) 29'; Jonny (yellow card) 41'; Orellana 61'; Hernández (yellow card) 84'	Report	Rodrigo (yellow card) 35', (goal) 43'; Parejo (yellow card) 67'; Barragán (yellow card) 71'	Stadium: Balaídos; Attendance: 18,000; Referee: José González González

17 January 2015 19	Espanyol	1–0	Celta Vigo	Barcelona
22:00 CET	Arbilla (yellow card) 54'; Cañas (yellow card) 58'; Álvaro (yellow card) 73'; Caicedo 90'	Summary	Fontàs (yellow card) 61'; Hernández (yellow card) 82'; Nolito (yellow card) 85'	Stadium: Cornellà-El Prat; Attendance: 15,000; Referee: Eduardo Prieto Iglesias

26 January 2015 20	Getafe	2–1	Celta Vigo	Getafe
20:45 CET	Vázquez 19'; Alexis (yellow card) 23'; Escudero (yellow card) 81'; Sarabia 85'	Summary	Charles 15'; Planas (yellow card) 49'; Radoja (yellow card) 77'; Jonny (yellow card) 84'; Gómez (yellow card) 89'	Stadium: Coliseum Alfonso Pérez; Attendance: 3,500; Referee: Antonio Mateu Lahoz

31 January 2015 21	Celta Vigo	1–0	Córdoba	Vigo
22:00	Orellana (yellow card) 29'; Mina (yellow card) 41'; Nolito 56'	Summary	Héldon (yellow card) 42'; Bebé (yellow card) 51'; Gómez (yellow card) 84'; Rossi (yellow card) 84'; Bouzón (yellow card) 85'; Crespo (yellow card) 90+6'	Stadium: Balaídos; Attendance: 16,200; Referee: José Antonio Teixeira Vitienes

8 February 2015 22	Real Sociedad	1–1	Celta Vigo	San Sebastián
22:00	Agirretxe 8', (yellow card) 60'; González (yellow card) 12'; Granero (yellow card) 51'; Zaldúa (yellow card) 71'; Pardo (yellow card) 80'	Summary	Fernández (yellow card) 53'; López (yellow card) 55'; Cabral (yellow card) 63'; Jonny (yellow card) 83'; Nolito 85'	Stadium: Anoeta; Attendance: 14,836; Referee: Santiago Jaime Latre

15 February 2015 23	Celta Vigo	2–0	Atlético Madrid	Vigo
21:00	Nolito 59' (pen.); Orellana 71'	Summary	Godín (yellow card) 57'; Suárez (yellow card) 57'; Cani (yellow card) 63'	Stadium: Balaídos; Attendance: 15,600; Referee: Juan Martínez Munuera

21 February 2015 24	Deportivo La Coruña	0–2	Celta Vigo	A Coruña
22:00	Lopo (yellow card) 6' (yellow-red card) 72'; Luisinho (yellow card) 53'; Lucas (yellow card) 65'	Summary	Charles 46', (yellow card) 59'; Nolito (yellow card) 65'; Larrivey 82'; Sergio (yellow card) 86'; Gómez (yellow card) 87'	Stadium: Riazor; Attendance: 30,334; Referee: Pedro Pérez Montero

2 March 2015 25	Celta Vigo	1–1	Elche	Vigo
20:45 CET	Radoja (yellow card) 22'; Mallo (yellow card) 41'; Krohn-Dehli 61', (yellow card) 88'; Fontàs (yellow card) 63'; Cabral (yellow card) 69'; López (yellow card) 83'	Summary	Alonso (yellow card) 22'; Cisma (yellow card) 57'; Lombán 88' (pen.); Herrera (yellow card) 90+4'	Stadium: Balaídos; Attendance: 14,500; Referee: Carlos Velasco Carballo

8 March 2015 26	Villarreal	4–1	Celta Vigo	Villarreal
19:00 CET	G. Dos Santos 41'; Musacchio 45+1'; Vietto 73'; Gerard 84'	Summary	Fernández 50'; Nolito (yellow card) 75'; Fontàs (yellow card) 77'	Stadium: El Madrigal; Attendance: 14,366; Referee: Carlos Clos Gómez

14 March 2015 27	Celta Vigo	1–2	Athletic Bilbao	Vigo
22:00 CET	Fernández (yellow card) 16'; Krohn-Dehli (yellow card) 20'; Orellana (yellow card) 23'; Larrivey 64'	Summary	Beñat (yellow card) 15'; Aduriz 17' (pen.); San José (yellow card) 27' (yellow-red card) 85', (goal) 32'; De Marcos (yellow card) 43'; Susaeta (yellow card) 90'	Stadium: Balaídos; Attendance: 17,000; Referee: Antonio Mateu Lahoz

21 March 2015 28	Levante	0–1	Celta Vigo	Valencia
20:00 CET	García (yellow card) 28'; Toño (yellow card) 38'; Barral (yellow card) 39'; Diop (yellow card) 45'	Summary	Larrivey (yellow card) 30'; Mallo (yellow card) 83'; Charles 86'; Jonny (yellow card) 90+1'	Stadium: Ciutat de València; Attendance: 11,473; Referee: José Antonio Teixeira Vitienes

5 April 2015 29	Celta Vigo	0–1	Barcelona	Vigo
21:00 CET	Krohn-Dehli (yellow card) 24'; Orellana (red card) 87'; Nolito (yellow card) 90+4'	Summary	Suárez (yellow card) 45+1'; Mathieu 73'; Busquets (yellow card) 88'	Stadium: Balaídos; Attendance: 23,731; Referee: Iñaki Vicandi Garrido

8 April 2015 30	Granada	1–1	Celta Vigo	Granada
22:00 CET	Robert 3'; Murillo (yellow card) 39' (yellow-red card) 42'; Roberto (yellow card) 41'; Nyom (yellow card) 74'; Córdoba (yellow card) 84'; Iturra (yellow card) 90+6'	Summary	Jonny (yellow card) 37'; Cabral (yellow card) 39'; López (yellow card) 59'; Radoja (yellow card) 67'; Hernández (yellow card) 74'; Bongonda 90+3'	Stadium: Nuevo Los Cármenes; Attendance: 14,338; Referee: Alfonso Álvarez Izquierdo

11 April 2015 31	Celta Vigo	6–1	Rayo Vallecano	Vigo
22:00 CET	Larrivey 6', 37'; Mina 21', 40', 51', 56'; Fernández (yellow card) 23'	Report	Manucho 1'; Trashorras (yellow card) 38'	Stadium: Balaídos; Attendance: 21,000; Referee: Carlos Clos Gómez

19 April 2015 32	Eibar	0–1	Celta Vigo	Eibar
21:00 CET	Lillo (yellow card) 45+3'; Arruabarrena (yellow card) 61'	Report	Larrivey (yellow card) 23'; Nolito 40' (pen.); Orellana (yellow card) 45+3'	Stadium: Ipurua; Attendance: 4,520; Referee: Carlos Velasco Carballo

26 April 2015 33	Celta Vigo	2–4	Real Madrid	Vigo
21:00 CET	Nolito 9'; Mina 28'; Orellana (yellow card) 51'; Jonny (yellow card) 53'; Krohn-Dehli (yellow card) 53'	Report	Kroos 16'; Hernández 24', 69'; Rodríguez 43'; Ramos (yellow card) 84'; Carvajal (yellow card) 90'	Stadium: Balaídos; Attendance: 25,077; Referee: Pedro Pérez Montero

29 April 2015 34	Celta Vigo	1–0	Málaga	Vigo
20:00 CET	Nolito 89', (yellow card) 90'; Fernández (yellow card) 90+2'; López (yellow card) 90+2'	Report	Darder (yellow card) 40'; Juanmi (yellow card) 77'; Tissone (yellow card) 85'; Weligton (yellow card) 90+2'; Recio (yellow card) 90+2'	Stadium: Balaídos; Attendance: 17,205; Referee: Alejandro Hernández Hernández

4 May 2015 35	Almería	2–2	Celta Vigo	Almería
20:45 CET	Bifouma 47', (yellow card) 50'; Mauro (yellow card) 59' (yellow-red card) 74'; Zongo 68'; Thomas (yellow card) 90+2'	Report	Nolito 17'; Mina 39', (yellow card) 68'; Mallo (yellow card) 51'; Larrivey (yellow card) 54'; Cabral (red card) 54'	Stadium: Juegos Mediterráneos; Attendance: 10,898; Referee: José Antonio Teixeira Vitienes

10 May 2015 36	Celta Vigo	1–1	Sevilla	Vigo
21:00 CET	Fernández (yellow card) 45+1'; Mina (yellow card) 45+2', (goal) 58' (pen.); Costas (yellow card) 90+1'	Report	Gameiro 8'; Coke (yellow card) 36'; Aspas (yellow card) 40'; Rico (yellow card) 41'; Arribas (yellow card) 57'; Krychowiak (yellow card) 59'	Stadium: Balaídos; Attendance: 18,957; Referee: Carlos Velasco Carballo

17 May 2015 37	Valencia	1–1	Celta Vigo	Valencia
19:00 CET	Mustafi (yellow card) 38'; Otamendi 71'	Report	Hernández 8'; Cabral (yellow card) 27'; Nolito (yellow card) 62'; Krohn-Dehli (yellow card) 78'; Borja (yellow card) 86'; Mallo (yellow card) 90+4'	Stadium: Mestalla; Attendance: 44,498; Referee: Jesús Gil Manzano

23 May 2015 38	Celta Vigo	3–2	Espanyol	Vigo
18:30 CET	Sergio (red card) 20'; Fernández (yellow card) 28'; Mallo 38'; Mina (yellow card) 45+3'; Cabral 58'; Nolito 76'	Report	García 23' (pen.); Stuani 48'; Álvaro (yellow card) 89'	Stadium: Balaídos; Attendance: 15,000; Referee: Carlos del Cerro Grande

=== Copa del Rey ===
==== Round of 32 ====
2 December 2014 First leg	Las Palmas	2 – 1	Celta Vigo	Las Palmas
22:00 CET	Hernán 23', (yellow card) 74'; Castellano (yellow card) 59'; Silva 79'	Report	Costas (yellow card) 35'; Iglesias (yellow card) 56'; Planas (yellow card) 65'; Gómez (yellow card) 73'; Orellana (yellow card) 73'; Mina 83' (pen.); Krohn-Dehli (yellow card) 83'	Stadium: Gran Canaria; Attendance: 10,679; Referee: (Spain) Carlos Velasco

16 December 2014 Second leg	Celta de Vigo	3 – 1 (4 – 3 agg.)	Las Palmas	Vigo
20:00	Larrivey 19'; Mina (yellow card) 35', (goal) 50'; Nolito (yellow card) 60'; Orellana 89'	Report	López (yellow card) 28'; Nauzet (yellow card) 38', (goal) 53'; Aythami (yellow card) 62' (yellow-red card); Silva (yellow card) 77'	Stadium: Balaídos; Attendance: 11,320; Referee: (Spain) Fernando Teixeira Vitienes

==== Round of 16 ====
6 January 2015 first leg	Celta de Vigo	2 – 4	Athletic Bilbao	Vigo
17:00 CET	López 11'; Costas (yellow card) 36' (yellow-red card); Charles 54', (yellow card) 82'; Gabral (yellow card) 86'	Summary	San José 5', (yellow card) 77'; Aduriz 15', 87' (pen.); Rico (yellow card) 31'; Etxeita (yellow card) 39'; Sussaeta 61'; Muniain (yellow card) 66'	Stadium: Balaídos; Attendance: 14,929; Referee: (Spain) Pedro Pérez

14 January 2015 second leg	Athletic Bilbao	0 – 2 (4 – 4 agg.)	Celta de Vigo	Bilbao
20:00 CET	Beñat (yellow card) 38'; Rico (yellow card) 60'; Gurpegui (yellow card) 80'	Summary	Samu (yellow card) 21'; Etxeita 48' (o.g.); Orellana 61' (pen.); Hernández (yellow card) 72'; Charles (yellow card) 75'	Stadium: San Mamés; Attendance: 25,000; Referee: (Spain) Juan Martínez Munuera

== Statistics ==
=== Appearances and goals ===
No.	Pos	Nat	Player	Total		La Liga		Copa del Rey	
No.	Pos	Nat	Player	Apps	Goals	Apps	Goals	Apps	Goals
Goalkeepers
1	GK	(Spain) ESP	Sergio Álvarez	38	0	38	0	0	0
13	GK	(Spain) ESP	Rubén Blanco	5	0	0+1	0	4	0
Defenders
2	DF	(Spain) ESP	Hugo Mallo	29	1	27+1	1	0+1	0
3	DF	(Spain) ESP	Andreu Fontàs	36	0	33+1	0	2	0
15	DF	(Spain) ESP	David Costas	3	0	1	0	2	0
19	DF	(Spain) ESP	Jonny	39	0	32+4	0	2+1	0
20	DF	(Spain) ESP	Sergi Gómez	26	0	14+8	0	4	0
21	DF	(Spain) ESP	Carles Planas	14	0	10+1	0	3	0
22	DF	(Argentina) ARG	Gustavo Cabral	38	1	35	1	3	0
31	DF	(Spain) ESP	Samu	1	0	0	0	1	0
Midfielders
4	MF	(Spain) ESP	Borja Oubiña	0	0	0	0	0	0
5	MF	(Chile) CHI	Pablo Hernández	32	1	15+14	1	1+2	0
6	MF	(Serbia) SRB	Nemanja Radoja	31	0	23+5	0	2+1	0
8	MF	(Spain) ESP	Álex López	28	2	12+13	1	3	1
14	MF	(Chile) CHI	Fabián Orellana	39	7	34+1	5	2+2	2
17	MF	(Gabon) GAB	Lévy Madinda	6	0	0+5	0	1	0
18	MF	(Belgium) BEL	Théo Bongonda	9	1	0+8	1	0+1	0
23	MF	(Denmark) DEN	Michael Krohn-Dehli	38	1	35+1	1	1+1	0
24	MF	(Argentina) ARG	Augusto Fernández	34	1	24+6	1	3+1	0
28	MF	(Spain) ESP	Borja Fernández	9	0	1+5	0	2+1	0
Forwards
7	FW	(Spain) ESP	Santi Mina	24	9	14+6	7	3+1	2
9	FW	(Brazil) BRA	Charles	31	4	12+16	3	3	1
10	FW	(Spain) ESP	Nolito	37	13	32+4	13	1	0
11	FW	(Argentina) ARG	Joaquín Larrivey	36	12	26+9	11	1	1
34	FW	(Spain) ESP	Borja Iglesias	1	0	0+1	0	0	0

Last updated: 30 May 2015
Source: BDFutbol
