= 2018–19 Celta de Vigo season =

Celta de Vigo
2018–19 season
- President: Carlos Mouriño
- Head coach: Antonio Mohamed (until 12 November 2018); Miguel Cardoso (from 12 November 2018 until 3 March 2019); Fran Escribá (from 3 March 2019)
- Stadium: Balaídos
- La Liga: 17th
- Copa del Rey: Round of 32
- Top goalscorer: League: Iago Aspas (20); All: Iago Aspas (21)
Home colours	Away colours

During the 2018–19 season, RC Celta de Vigo participated in La Liga and the Copa del Rey.

== Players ==
=== Squad ===
As of 31 August 2018

Note: Flags indicate national team as defined under FIFA eligibility rules; some limited exceptions apply. Players may hold more than one non-FIFA nationality.

No.	Pos.	Nation	Player
1	GK	ESP	Sergio (vice-captain)
2	DF	ESP	Hugo Mallo (captain)
3	DF	ESP	David Costas
4	DF	MEX	Néstor Araujo
5	MF	TUR	Okay Yokuşlu
6	MF	SRB	Nemanja Radoja
7	MF	TUR	Emre Mor
8	MF	ESP	Fran Beltrán
9	FW	URU	Maxi Gómez
10	FW	ESP	Iago Aspas
11	MF	DEN	Pione Sisto
13	GK	ESP	Rubén Blanco

No.	Pos.	Nation	Player
14	MF	SVK	Stanislav Lobotka
15	DF	SVK	Róbert Mazáň
16	MF	DEN	Andrew Hjulsager
17	DF	ESP	David Juncà
18	MF	DEN	Mathias Jensen
19	MF	MAR	Sofiane Boufal (on loan from Southampton)
20	DF	ESP	Kevin Vázquez
21	MF	ESP	Jozabed
22	DF	ARG	Gustavo Cabral (3rd captain)
23	MF	ESP	Brais Méndez
24	DF	ARG	Facundo Roncaglia
32	FW	GER	Dennis Eckert

=== Reserve team ===
Note: Flags indicate national team as defined under FIFA eligibility rules; some limited exceptions apply. Players may hold more than one non-FIFA nationality.

No.	Pos.	Nation	Player
26	GK	ESP	Iván Villar

=== Out on loan ===
Note: Flags indicate national team as defined under FIFA eligibility rules; some limited exceptions apply. Players may hold more than one non-FIFA nationality.

No.	Pos.	Nation	Player
—	FW	GLP	Claudio Beauvue (at Caen until 30 June 2019)
—	FW	ESP	Juan Hernández (at Cádiz until 30 June 2019)

== Transfers ==
=== In ===
Date	Player	From	Type	Fee	Ref
29 May 2018	(Sweden) John Guidetti	(Spain) Alavés	Loan return		
4 June 2018	(Spain) David Juncà	(Spain) Eibar	Transfer	Free	
14 June 2018	(Mexico) Néstor Araujo	(Mexico) Santos Laguna	Transfer	Undisclosed	
16 June 2018	(Turkey) Okay Yokuşlu	(Turkey) Trabzonspor	Transfer	€7,500,000	
19 June 2018	(Spain) Álvaro Lemos	(Spain) Lugo	Loan return		
30 June 2018	(Guadeloupe) Claudio Beauvue	(Spain) Leganés	Loan return		
30 June 2018	(Belgium) Théo Bongonda	(Belgium) Zulte-Waregem	Loan return		
30 June 2018	(Spain) David Costas	(Spain) Barcelona B	Loan return		
30 June 2018	(Spain) Borja Fernández	(Spain) Reus	Loan return		
30 June 2018	(Denmark) Andrew Hjulsager	(Spain) Granada	Loan return		
30 June 2018	(Spain) Iván Villar	(Spain) Levante	Loan return		
20 July 2018	(Morocco) Sofiane Boufal	(England) Southampton	Loan		
1 August 2018	(Spain) Fran Beltrán	(Spain) Rayo Vallecano	Transfer	€8,000,000	
8 August 2018	(Denmark) Mathias Jensen	(Denmark) Nordsjælland	Transfer	€5,000,000	
14 August 2018	(Paraguay) Júnior Alonso	(France) Lille	Loan		

=== Out ===
Date	Player	To	Type	Fee	Ref
29 May 2018	(Sweden) John Guidetti	(Spain) Alavés	Transfer	€4,000,000	
19 June 2018	(Spain) Álvaro Lemos	(Spain) Las Palmas	Transfer	Undisclosed	
30 June 2018	(Argentina) Lucas Boyé	(Italy) Torino	Loan return		
4 July 2018	(Belgium) Théo Bongonda	(Belgium) Zulte-Waregem	Transfer	€1,600,000	
4 July 2018	(Chile) Pablo Hernández	(Argentina) Independiente	Transfer	€1,000,000	
9 July 2018	(Spain) Borja Iglesias	(Spain) Espanyol	Transfer	€10,000,000	
10 July 2018	(Denmark) Daniel Wass	(Spain) Valencia	Transfer	€6,000,000	
23 July 2018	(Spain) Sergi Gómez	(Spain) Sevilla	Transfer	€5,000,000	
25 July 2018	(Spain) Jonny	(Spain) Atlético Madrid	Transfer	€7,000,000	
8 August 2018	(Spain) Juan Hernández	(Spain) Cádiz	Loan		
8 August 2018	(Spain) Andreu Fontàs	(United States) Sporting Kansas City	Transfer	Free	
30 August 2018	(Guadeloupe) Claudio Beauvue	(France) Caen	Loan		
2 January 2019	(Paraguay) Júnior Alonso	(France) Lille	Loan return		

== Competitions ==
=== Overall ===
Competition	First match	Last match	Starting round	Final position	Record							
Competition	First match	Last match	Starting round	Final position	Pld	W	D	L	GF	GA	GD	Win %
La Liga	18 August 2018	19 May 2019	Matchday 1	17th	38	10	11	17	53	62	−9	26.32
Copa del Rey	1 November 2018	5 December 2018	Round of 32	Round of 32	2	0	1	1	1	3	−2	0.00
Total					40	10	12	18	54	65	−11	25.00

Last updated: 18 May 2019
Source: Competitions

=== La Liga ===
==== League table ====
Pos	Team	Pld	W	D	L	GF	GA	GD	Pts	Qualification or relegation
15	Levante	38	11	11	16	59	66	−7	44 (Note: Villarreal finished ahead of Levante on head-to-head points: Villarreal 1–1 Levante, Levante 0–2 Villarreal.)	
16	Valladolid	38	10	11	17	32	51	−19	41 (Note: Valladolid finished ahead of Celta Vigo on head-to-head points: Celta Vigo 3–3 Valladolid, Valladolid 2–1 Celta Vigo.)	
17	Celta Vigo	38	10	11	17	53	62	−9	41	
18	Girona (R)	38	9	10	19	37	53	−16	37	Relegation to Segunda División
19	Huesca (R)	38	7	12	19	43	65	−22	33	Relegation to Segunda División

Source: La Liga, Soccerway
Rules for classification: 1) Points; 2) Head-to-head points; 3) Head-to-head goal difference; 4) Goal difference; 5) Goals scored; 6) Fair-play points (Note: Head-to-head record is used only after all the matches between the teams in question have been played)
(R) Relegated

==== Results summary ====
Overall								Home						Away					
Pld	W	D	L	GF	GA	GD	Pts	W	D	L	GF	GA	GD	W	D	L	GF	GA	GD
38	10	11	17	53	62	−9	41	8	5	6	31	25	+6	2	6	11	22	37	−15

Last updated: 18 May 2019.
Source: Competitive matches

==== Results by round ====
Round	1	2	3	4	5	6	7	8	9	10	11	12	13	14	15	16	17	18	19	20	21	22	23	24	25	26	27	28	29	30	31	32	33	34	35	36	37	38
Ground	H	A	H	A	H	A	H	A	H	H	A	H	A	H	A	H	A	H	A	H	A	H	A	H	A	A	H	A	H	A	H	A	H	A	A	H	A	H
Result	D	W	W	L	D	D	D	L	L	W	D	L	L	W	W	D	L	L	L	L	L	W	L	L	D	L	L	L	W	D	W	L	W	D	D	W	L	D
Position	9	8	3	3	4	7	8	10	13	10	11	14	15	13	11	9	10	14	17	17	18	16	16	17	17	17	18	18	18	18	16	17	15	16	15	14	17	17

Updated to match(es) played on 18 May 2019. Source: Competitive matches
A = Away; H = Home; W = Win; D = Draw; L = Loss

==== Matches ====
Win Draw Loss Fixtures

18 August 2018 1	Celta Vigo	1–1	Espanyol	Vigo
18:15 CEST (UTC+02:00)	Méndez (yellow card) 43'; David López 52' (o.g.); Aspas (yellow card) 70'; Alonso (yellow card) 90+1'	Report	Hermoso 45'; Roca (yellow card) 73'; Vilà (yellow card) 90+5'	Stadium: Balaídos; Attendance: 16,362; Referee: Santiago Jaime Latre

27 August 2018 2	Levante	1–2	Celta Vigo	Valencia
20:15 CEST (UTC+02:00)	Campaña (yellow card) 74'; Morales 78' (pen.); Róber (yellow card) 90+6'	Report	Sisto 10'; Gómez 35'; Mallo (yellow card) 63'; Sergio (yellow card) 77'; Boufal (yellow card) 90+3'	Stadium: Ciutat de València; Attendance: 19,592; Referee: Alejandro Hernández Hernández

1 September 2018 3	Celta Vigo	2–0	Atlético Madrid	Vigo
18:30 CEST (UTC+02:00)	Lobotka (yellow card) 41'; Gómez 46'; Alonso (yellow card) 48'; Aspas 52'; Yokuşlu (yellow card) 74'; Mallo (yellow card) 76'	Report	Saúl (yellow card) 17'; Partey (yellow card) 28'; Savić (yellow card) 51' (yellow-red card) 70'; Costa (yellow card) 57'	Stadium: Balaídos; Attendance: 19,013; Referee: Antonio Mateu Lahoz

17 September 2018 4	Girona	3–2	Celta Vigo	Girona
21:00 CEST (UTC+02:00)	Stuani 22', 56'; Alcalá 37'; Douglas (yellow card) 90+6'	Report	Aspas 34'; Cabral (yellow card) 70' (red card) 90+2'; Beltrán (yellow card) 70'; Boufal 87'	Stadium: Montilivi; Attendance: 9,849; Referee: Javier Alberola Rojas

22 September 2018 5	Celta Vigo	3–3	Valladolid	Vigo
16:15 CEST (UTC+02:00)	Aspas 5', 54'; Gómez 9'; Roncaglia (yellow card) 42'; Juncà (yellow card) 49'	Report	Alcarez (yellow card) 20'; Čop (yellow card) 25'; Plano 39'; Ünal 65'; Suárez 90+4'	Stadium: Balaídos; Attendance: 16,552; Referee: Eduardo Prieto Iglesias

26 September 2018 6	Valencia	1–1	Celta Vigo	Valencia
22:00 CEST (UTC+02:00)	Batshuayi 25', (yellow card) 56'	Report	Aspas (yellow card) 45', (goal) 82'; Mallo (yellow card) 48'; Beltrán (yellow card) 75'	Stadium: Mestalla; Attendance: 35,495; Referee: Ricardo de Burgos Bengoetxea

1 October 2018 7	Celta Vigo	1–1	Getafe	Vigo
21:00 CEST (UTC+02:00)	Gómez 33'; Aspas (yellow card) 82'; Mallo (yellow card) 90+1'	Report	Bruno (yellow card) 20'; Mata 78'; Portillo (yellow card) 82'	Stadium: Balaídos; Attendance: 14,330; Referee: Guillermo Cuadra Fernández

7 October 2018 8	Sevilla	2–1	Celta Vigo	Seville
18:30 CEST (UTC+02:00)	Banega (yellow card) 17'; Sarabia 39'; Carriço (yellow card) 56'; Ben Yedder 61'; Arana (yellow card) 89'	Report	Roncaglia (yellow card) 17'; Araujo (yellow card) 56' (yellow-red card) 58'; Boufal 85'; Cabral (yellow card) 90+2'	Stadium: Ramón Sánchez Pizjuán; Attendance: 38,141; Referee: Pablo González Fuertes

19 October 2018 9	Celta Vigo	0–1	Alavés	Vigo
21:00 CEST (UTC+02:00)	Cabral (yellow card) 58'; Hjulsager (yellow card) 90+1'	Report	Laguardia (yellow card) 11'; Pina 58', (yellow card) 88'; Calleri (yellow card) 64'	Stadium: Balaídos; Attendance: 15,805; Referee: Carlos del Cerro Grande

27 October 2018 10	Celta Vigo	4–0	Eibar	Vigo
18:30 CET (UTC+01:00)	Aspas 5', 36', 86'; Méndez 56'	Report		Stadium: Balaídos; Attendance: 15,585; Referee: José Luis González González

4 November 2018 11	Real Betis	3–3	Celta Vigo	Seville
20:45 CET (UTC+01:00)	Loren 33'; Junior 57', (yellow card) 72'; Joaquín (yellow card) 65'; Canales (yellow card) 69', (goal) 87'; Mandi (yellow card) 78'	Report	Juncà (yellow card) 62'; Gómez 63', 84'; Méndez 69'; Yokuşlu (yellow card) 82'	Stadium: Benito Villamarín; Attendance: 42,130; Referee: Xavier Estrada Fernández

11 November 2018 12	Celta Vigo	2–4	Real Madrid	Vigo
20:45 CET (UTC+01:00)	Cabral (yellow card) 40' (yellow-red card) 87'; Mallo (yellow card) 41', (goal) 61'; Juncà (yellow card) 44'; Méndez 90+4'	Report	Benzema 23'; Reguilón (yellow card) 37'; Javi Sánchez (yellow card) 53'; Cabral 56' (o.g.); Ramos 83' (pen.); Ceballos 90+1'	Stadium: Balaídos; Attendance: 21,184; Referee: Alberto Undiano Mallenco

26 November 2018 13	Real Sociedad	2–1	Celta Vigo	San Sebastián
21:00 CET (UTC+01:00)	Oyarzabal 37', (yellow card) 90+2'; Zurutuza 47'; Sandro (yellow card) 89'	Report	Juncà (yellow card) 76'; Gómez 82', (yellow card) 87'	Stadium: Anoeta; Attendance: 17,745; Referee: Mario Melero López

1 December 2018 14	Celta Vigo	2–0	Huesca	Vigo
13:00 CET (UTC+01:00)	Boufal (yellow card) 32'; Aspas 38', 77'; Blanco (yellow card) 59'	Report	Hernández (yellow card) 29'; Musto (yellow card) 31'; Etxeita (yellow card) 37'	Stadium: Balaídos; Attendance: 13,463; Referee: Adrián Cordero Vega

8 December 2018 15	Villarreal	2–3	Celta Vigo	Villarreal
18:30 CET (UTC+01:00)	Cáseras (yellow card) 14'; Álvaro (yellow card) 39'; Mario Gaspar (yellow card) 48'; Bacca 83', 87'	Report	Méndez 44'; Yokuşlu 49', (yellow card) 76'; Gómez 51', (yellow card) 85'; Blanco (yellow card) 90+3'	Stadium: Estadio de la Cerámica; Attendance: 15,720; Referee: Jesús Gil Manzano

14 December 2018 16	Celta Vigo	0–0	Leganés	Vigo
21:00 CET (UTC+01:00)	Juncà (yellow card) 28'; Gómez (yellow card) 35'; Costas (yellow card) 85'	Report	En-Nesyri (yellow card) 17'; Vesga (yellow card) 24'; Cuéllar (yellow card) 90+3'	Stadium: Balaídos; Attendance: 15,134; Referee: José Luis Munuera Montero

22 December 2018 17	Barcelona	2–0	Celta Vigo	Barcelona
18:30 CET (UTC+01:00)	O. Dembélé 10'; Messi 45'	Report	Aspas (yellow card) 45'	Stadium: Camp Nou; Attendance: 78,686; Referee: Eduardo Prieto Iglesias

7 January 2019 18	Celta Vigo	1–2	Athletic Bilbao	Vigo
21:00 CET (UTC+01:00)	Yokuşlu (yellow card) 25'; Beltrán 45'; Mallo (yellow card) 67'	Report	Williams (yellow card) 15', (goal) 54'; Muniain 19', (yellow card) 90+2'; Córdoba (yellow card) 40'; García (yellow card) 58'; Aduriz (yellow card) 85'	Stadium: Balaídos; Attendance: 13,266; Referee: Juan Martínez Munuera

11 January 2019 19	Rayo Vallecano	4–2	Celta Vigo	Madrid
21:00 CET (UTC+01:00)	De Tomás 4', 37', 77'; Ba (yellow card) 16'; Advíncula (yellow card) 71'; Velázquez (yellow card) 80'; Bebé 90+1', (yellow card) 90+2'	Report	Araujo 13'; Gómez 18' (pen.); Méndez (yellow card) 19'	Stadium: Vallecas; Attendance: 11,465; Referee: Javier Alberola Rojas

19 January 2019 20	Celta Vigo	1–2	Valencia	Vigo
20:45 CET (UTC+01:00)	Jozabed (yellow card) 11'; Araujo 40'; Méndez (yellow card) 58'; Mallo (yellow card) 76'; Roncaglia (yellow card) 90+2'	Report	Soler (yellow card) 42'; Gabriel (yellow card) 42'; Torres 71', (yellow card) 80'; Rodrigo 84'	Stadium: Balaídos; Attendance: 15,668; Referee: José Luis González González

27 January 2019 21	Valladolid	2–1	Celta Vigo	Valladolid
12:00 CET (UTC+01:00)	Plano 55'; Toni (yellow card) 60'; Keko 69'; Míchel (yellow card) 90'	Report	Sisto 16'; Mallo (yellow card) 40'; Hoedt (yellow card) 41' (yellow-red card) 87'; Boufal (yellow card) 52'; Juncà (yellow card) 89'	Stadium: José Zorrilla; Attendance: 18,416; Referee: José María Sánchez Martínez

2 February 2019 22	Celta Vigo	1–0	Sevilla	Vigo
20:45 CET (UTC+01:00)	Yokuşlu (yellow card) 49', (goal) 73'; Beltrán (yellow card) 80'; Costas (yellow card) 88'; Méndez (yellow card) 90'	Report	Sarabia (yellow card) 29'; Gómez (yellow card) 63'; Ben Yedder (yellow card) 88'; Banega (yellow card) 89'	Stadium: Balaídos; Attendance: 17,503; Referee: Ricardo de Burgos Bengoetxea

9 February 2019 23	Getafe	3–1	Celta Vigo	Getafe
13:00 CET (UTC+01:00)	Mata 39' (pen.), 81', (yellow card) 64'; Molina 62'; Flamini (yellow card) 69'; Olivera (yellow card) 89'	Report	Araujo 2'; Gómez (yellow card) 37' (yellow-red card) 37'; Costas (yellow card) 87'	Stadium: Coliseum Alfonso Pérez; Attendance: 9,918; Referee: Pablo González Fuertes

16 February 2019 24	Celta Vigo	1–4	Levante	Vigo
13:00 CET (UTC+01:00)	Boufal (yellow card) 44'; Boudebouz (red card) 49'; Méndez 88' (pen.)	Report	Morales 20', 62'; Coke 40'; Doukouré (yellow card) 80'; Mayoral 89'	Stadium: Balaídos; Attendance: 15,479; Referee: Santiago Jaime Latre

23 February 2019 25	Alavés	0–0	Celta Vigo	Vitoria-Gasteiz
18:30 CET (UTC+01:00)	Navarro (yellow card) 45'; Duarte (yellow card) 59'	Report	Yokuşlu (yellow card) 54'; Mallo (yellow card) 70'	Stadium: Mendizorrotza; Attendance: 18,882; Referee: Carlos del Cerro Grande

3 March 2019 26	Eibar	1–0	Celta Vigo	Eibar
12:00 CET (UTC+01:00)	José Ángel (yellow card) 74'; Enrich 87'	Report	Costas (yellow card) 37'	Stadium: Ipurua; Attendance: 4,682; Referee: Guillermo Cuadra Fernández

10 March 2019 27	Celta Vigo	0–1	Real Betis	Vigo
12:00 CET (UTC+01:00)	Yokuşlu (yellow card) 64'; Gómez (yellow card) 76'; Mallo (yellow card) 90+5'	Report	Jesé 80'	Stadium: Balaídos; Attendance: 18,005; Referee: Xavier Estrada Fernández

16 March 2019 28	Real Madrid	2–0	Celta Vigo	Madrid
16:15 CET (UTC+01:00)	Isco 62'; Bale (yellow card) 45', (goal) 77'	Report		Stadium: Santiago Bernabéu; Attendance: 65,054; Referee: Juan Martínez Munuera

30 March 2019 29	Celta Vigo	3–2	Villarreal	Vigo
18:30 CET (UTC+01:00)	Aspas 50', 86' (pen.); Mallo (yellow card) 61'; Gómez 71'	Report	Toko Ekambi 11'; Pedraza 15', (yellow card) 44'; Mario Gaspar (yellow card) 50'; Ruiz (yellow card) 60'	Stadium: Balaídos; Attendance: 22,315; Referee: Jesús Gil Manzano

3 April 2019 30	Huesca	3–3	Celta Vigo	Huesca
20:30 CEST (UTC+02:00)	Pulido (yellow card) 25', (goal) 73'; Etxeita (yellow card) 55'; Gallego 63'; Ávila 71'	Report	Méndez 14', (yellow card) 18'; Olaza (yellow card) 52'; Aspas 57'; Boudebouz 81'; Mor (yellow card) 88'	Stadium: El Alcoraz; Attendance: 6,552; Referee: Adrián Cordero Vega

7 April 2019 31	Celta Vigo	3–1	Real Sociedad	Vigo
18:30 CEST (UTC+02:00)	Aspas 51' (pen.), 70', (yellow card) 70'; Yokuşlu (yellow card) 66'; Gómez 90+1'	Report	Willian José 32' (pen.), (red card) 58'; Rulli (yellow card) 46'	Stadium: Balaídos; Attendance: 20,519; Referee: Mario Melero López

13 April 2019 32	Atlético Madrid	2–0	Celta Vigo	Madrid
18:30 CEST (UTC+02:00)	Griezmann 42', (yellow card) 68'; Juanfran (yellow card) 56'; Morata 74'	Report	Boudebouz (yellow card) 37'; Olaza (yellow card) 87'	Stadium: Wanda Metropolitano; Attendance: 55,269; Referee: Ricardo de Burgos Bengoetxea

20 April 2019 33	Celta Vigo	2–1	Girona	Vigo
13:00 CEST (UTC+02:00)	Aspas 34'; Yokuşlu (yellow card) 47'; Boufal 69', (yellow card) 70'	Report	Portu 48'; Douglas Luiz (yellow card) 76'	Stadium: Balaídos; Attendance: 20,546; Referee: Carlos del Cerro Grande

24 April 2019 34	Espanyol	1–1	Celta Vigo	Barcelona
20:30 CEST (UTC+02:00)	Wu Lei 33'; Granero (yellow card) 39'; Roca (yellow card) 81'	Report	Yokuşlu (yellow card) 41'; Gómez 72'	Stadium: RCDE Stadium; Attendance: 15,680; Referee: Alberto Undiano Mallenco

27 April 2019 35	Leganés	0–0	Celta Vigo	Leganés
18:30 CEST (UTC+02:00)	Recio (yellow card) 45'	Report		Stadium: Municipal de Butarque; Attendance: 10,324; Referee: Juan Martínez Munuera

4 May 2019 36	Celta Vigo	2–0	Barcelona	Vigo
20:45 CEST (UTC+02:00)	Boufal (yellow card) 31'; Gómez 67'; Aspas 88' (pen.)	Report	Vermaelen (yellow card) 14'; Umtiti (yellow card) 29'; Todibo (yellow card) 55'; Boateng (yellow card) 72'; Vidal (yellow card) 79'	Stadium: Balaídos; Attendance: 22,519; Referee: José María Sánchez Martínez

12 May 2019 37	Athletic Bilbao	3–1	Celta Vigo	Bilbao
18:30 CEST (UTC+02:00)	R. García 16' (pen.), 17'; Williams 40'; Beñat (yellow card) 45'; Muniain (yellow card) 61'; Capa (yellow card) 87'; Aduriz (yellow card) 89'	Report	Boudebouz (yellow card) 24'; Araujo (yellow card) 36'; Hoedt (yellow card) 64'; Aspas 89' (pen.)	Stadium: San Mamés; Attendance: 42,494; Referee: Xavier Estrada Fernández

18 May 2019 38	Celta Vigo	2–2	Rayo Vallecano	Vigo
20:45 CEST (UTC+02:00)	Aspas 82', 90+2'	Report	Uche (yellow card) 4'; Embarba 29' (pen.); García (yellow card) 39'; Medrán 71'; Catena (yellow card) 79'; Dimitrievski (yellow card) 85'	Stadium: Balaídos; Attendance: 21,607; Referee: Antonio Mateu Lahoz

=== Copa del Rey ===
==== Round of 32 ====
1 November 2018 First leg	Celta Vigo	1–1	Real Sociedad	Vigo
16:15 CET (UTC+01:00)	Aspas 58'; Méndez (yellow card) 78'; Vázquez (yellow card) 83'	Report	Llorente (yellow card) 15'; Oyarzabal (yellow card) 48'; Zurutuza (yellow card) 64'; Moreno (yellow card) 86'; Juanmi 89'; Elustondo (yellow card) 90+1'; Illarramendi (yellow card) 90+4'	Stadium: Balaídos; Attendance: 15,195; Referee: José Luis Munuera Montero

5 December 2018 Second leg	Real Sociedad	2–0 (3–1 agg.)	Celta Vigo	San Sebastián
20:30 CET (UTC+01:00)	Oyarzabal 10'; Januzaj 27'	Report		Stadium: Anoeta; Attendance: 21,336; Referee: José María Sánchez Martínez

== Statistics ==
=== Appearances and goals ===
Last updated on 18 May 2019.

No.	Pos	Nat	Player	Total		La Liga		Copa del Rey	
No.	Pos	Nat	Player	Apps	Goals	Apps	Goals	Apps	Goals
Goalkeepers
1	GK	(Spain) ESP	Sergio	14	0	13	0	1	0
13	GK	(Spain) ESP	Rubén Blanco	26	0	25	0	1	0
Defenders
2	DF	(Spain) ESP	Hugo Mallo	35	1	35	1	0	0
3	DF	(Spain) ESP	David Costas	16	0	13+2	0	1	0
4	DF	(Mexico) MEX	Néstor Araujo	33	3	30+2	3	1	0
12	DF	(Netherlands) NED	Wesley Hoedt	10	0	9+1	0	0	0
15	DF	(Uruguay) URU	Lucas Olaza	10	0	10	0	0	0
17	DF	(Spain) ESP	David Juncà	21	0	21	0	0	0
20	DF	(Spain) ESP	Kevin Vázquez	6	0	2+2	0	2	0
22	DF	(Argentina) ARG	Gustavo Cabral	25	0	21+3	0	1	0
Midfielders
5	MF	(Turkey) TUR	Okay Yokuşlu	32	2	26+4	2	2	0
6	MF	(Serbia) SRB	Nemanja Radoja	0	0	0	0	0	0
7	MF	(Turkey) TUR	Emre Mor	12	0	4+6	0	1+1	0
8	MF	(Spain) ESP	Fran Beltrán	32	1	16+14	1	1+1	0
11	MF	(Denmark) DEN	Pione Sisto	27	2	8+17	2	2	0
14	MF	(Slovakia) SVK	Stanislav Lobotka	32	0	27+4	0	1	0
16	MF	(Denmark) DEN	Andrew Hjulsager	17	0	2+13	0	2	0
18	MF	(Denmark) DEN	Mathias Jensen	6	0	3+3	0	0	0
19	MF	(Morocco) MAR	Sofiane Boufal	35	3	25+10	3	0	0
21	MF	(Spain) ESP	Jozabed	21	0	14+6	0	0+1	0
23	MF	(Spain) ESP	Brais Méndez	32	6	27+4	6	0+1	0
24	MF	(Algeria) ALG	Ryad Boudebouz	11	1	8+3	1	0	0
Forwards
9	FW	(Uruguay) URU	Maxi Gómez	36	13	33+2	13	0+1	0
10	FW	(Spain) ESP	Iago Aspas	29	21	26+1	20	1+1	1
29	FW	(Nigeria) NGR	Emmanuel Apeh	2	0	0+2	0	0	0
Players who have made an appearance or had a squad number this season but have left the club
15	DF	(Slovakia) SVK	Róbert Mazáň	2	0	1	0	1	0
24	DF	(Argentina) ARG	Facundo Roncaglia	12	0	11	0	1	0
25	DF	(Paraguay) PAR	Júnior Alonso	11	0	6+3	0	2	0
32	FW	(Germany) GER	Dennis Eckert	10	0	1+8	0	1	0
