= Rubén Blanco =

Spanish footballer

- Rubén Blanco with Yokohama F. Marinos in 2026

Personal information
- Full name: Rubén Blanco Veiga
- Date of birth: 25 July 1995 (age 31)
- Place of birth: Mos, Spain
- Height: 1.89 m (6 ft 2 in)
- Position: Goalkeeper

Team information
- Current team: Yokohama F. Marinos
- Number: 36

Youth career
- Santa Mariña
- 2010–2012: Celta

Senior career*
| Years | Team | Apps | (Gls) |
| 2012–2015 | Celta B | 58 | (0) |
| 2013–2023 | Celta | 121 | (0) |
| 2022–2023 | → Marseille (loan) | 6 | (0) |
| 2023–2026 | Marseille | 2 | (0) |
| 2026 | Girona | 0 | (0) |
| 2026– | Yokohama F. Marinos | 4 | (0) |

International career
| 2011 | Spain U16 | 3 | (0) |
| 2011–2012 | Spain U17 | 7 | (0) |
| 2013–2014 | Spain U19 | 11 | (0) |
| 2012 | Spain U20 | 2 | (0) |
| 2014–2017 | Spain U21 | 2 | (0) |
Medal record
Men's Football
Representing Spain
UEFA European Under-21 Championship
| Second place | 2017 Poland |
- * Club domestic league appearances and goals as of 8 November 2026 (UTC)

Rubén Blanco Veiga (born 25 July 1995) is a Spanish professional footballer who plays as a goalkeeper for J1 League club Yokohama F. Marinos.

He made his senior debut for Celta in La Liga at the age of 17, and went on to play 142 games for the club.

== Club career ==
=== Celta ===
Born in Mos, Province of Pontevedra, Galicia, Blanco finished his youth career with local RC Celta de Vigo. He played his first games as a senior at only 16, with the reserves in the Segunda División B.

On 26 May 2013, two months shy of his 18th birthday, Blanco made his main squad – and La Liga – debut, entering the pitch at half-time after Javi Varas suffered a serious shoulder injury and keeping a clean sheet in a 2–0 away win against Real Valladolid. He retained his position for the following fixture, the last of the season, helping to a 1–0 home victory over RCD Espanyol as Celta managed to stay up, being the first team above the relegation zone.

Blanco made eight Copa del Rey appearances in 2015–16 in a semi-final run before a 6–2 aggregate loss to Sevilla FC; on the league front, he played as many matches as back-up to Sergio Álvarez. On 3 January 2016, he received a straight red card for a foul on Nordin Amrabat in a 2–0 loss at Málaga CF.

In 2016–17, Blanco made his continental debut as the side reached the semi-finals of the UEFA Europa League; he took part in four group games, beginning with the 2–2 draw against AFC Ajax at Balaídos Stadium on 20 October. After five appearances of the following campaign's domestic league, he succeeded Álvarez as starting goalkeeper under manager Juan Carlos Unzué. He was sent off on 16 October 2017 for taking down Jonathan Calleri in a 5–2 away win over UD Las Palmas.

Blanco signed a new contract in June 2018, running until 2023. On 9 November 2019, in a 4–1 away loss to FC Barcelona, he surpassed 1950s player Padrón as the youngest goalkeeper in club history to reach 100 games; both men were 24.

At the start of 2021–22, Blanco lost his place to veteran Matías Dituro, whom he had previously displaced from Celta's B team.

=== Marseille ===
On 20 July 2022, Blanco was loaned to Olympique de Marseille in France. At the end of the season, he signed a permanent contract for a reported fee of €2 million.

Blanco left the club by mutual consent in January 2026, with only 12 competitive matches to his credit.

=== Girona ===
On 11 February 2026, Blanco joined Girona FC on a deal until the end of the season; the Catalan side had just lost Marc-André ter Stegen, also recently acquired, to a serious hamstring injury. He made no appearances in four months.

=== Yokohama F. Marinos ===
On 26 June 2026, Blanco moved to J1 League club Yokohama F. Marinos.

== Career statistics ==
As of match played 18 February 2024

Appearances and goals by club, season and competition
| Club | Season | League | | | National cup (Note: Includes Copa del Rey, Coupe de France) | | Europe | | Total | |
| Club | Season | Division | Apps | Goals | Apps | Goals | Apps | Goals | Apps | Goals |
|---|---|---|---|---|---|---|---|---|---|---|
| Celta B | 2011–12 | Segunda División B | 4 | 0 | — | | — | | 4 | 0 |
| Celta B | 2013–14 | Segunda División B | 30 | 0 | — | | — | | 30 | 0 |
| Celta B | Total | | 34 | 0 | — | | — | | 34 | 0 |
| Celta | 2012–13 | La Liga | 2 | 0 | 0 | 0 | — | | 2 | 0 |
| Celta | 2013–14 | La Liga | 0 | 0 | 1 | 0 | — | | 1 | 0 |
| Celta | 2014–15 | La Liga | 1 | 0 | 4 | 0 | — | | 5 | 0 |
| Celta | 2015–16 | La Liga | 8 | 0 | 8 | 0 | — | | 16 | 0 |
| Celta | 2016–17 | La Liga | 11 | 0 | 0 | 0 | 4 (Note: Appearances in UEFA Europa League) | 0 | 15 | 0 |
| Celta | 2017–18 | La Liga | 22 | 0 | 0 | 0 | — | | 22 | 0 |
| Celta | 2018–19 | La Liga | 25 | 0 | 1 | 0 | — | | 26 | 0 |
| Celta | 2019–20 | La Liga | 33 | 0 | 1 | 0 | — | | 31 | 0 |
| Celta | 2020–21 | La Liga | 19 | 0 | 0 | 0 | — | | 19 | 0 |
| Celta | 2021–22 | La Liga | 0 | 0 | 2 | 0 | — | | 2 | 0 |
| Celta | Total | | 121 | 0 | 17 | 0 | 4 | 0 | 142 | 0 |
| Marseille (loan) | 2022–23 | Ligue 1 | 6 | 0 | 1 | 0 | 0 | 0 | 7 | 0 |
| Marseille | 2023–24 | Ligue 1 | 2 | 0 | 1 | 0 | 2 (Note: One appearance in UEFA Champions League, one appearance in UEFA Europa League) | 0 | 5 | 0 |
| Career total | | | 163 | 0 | 19 | 0 | 6 | 0 | 188 | 0 |

== Honours ==
Spain U21

- UEFA European Under-21 Championship runner-up: 2017
