= Sergio Álvarez (footballer, born 1986) =

Spanish footballer

Sergio
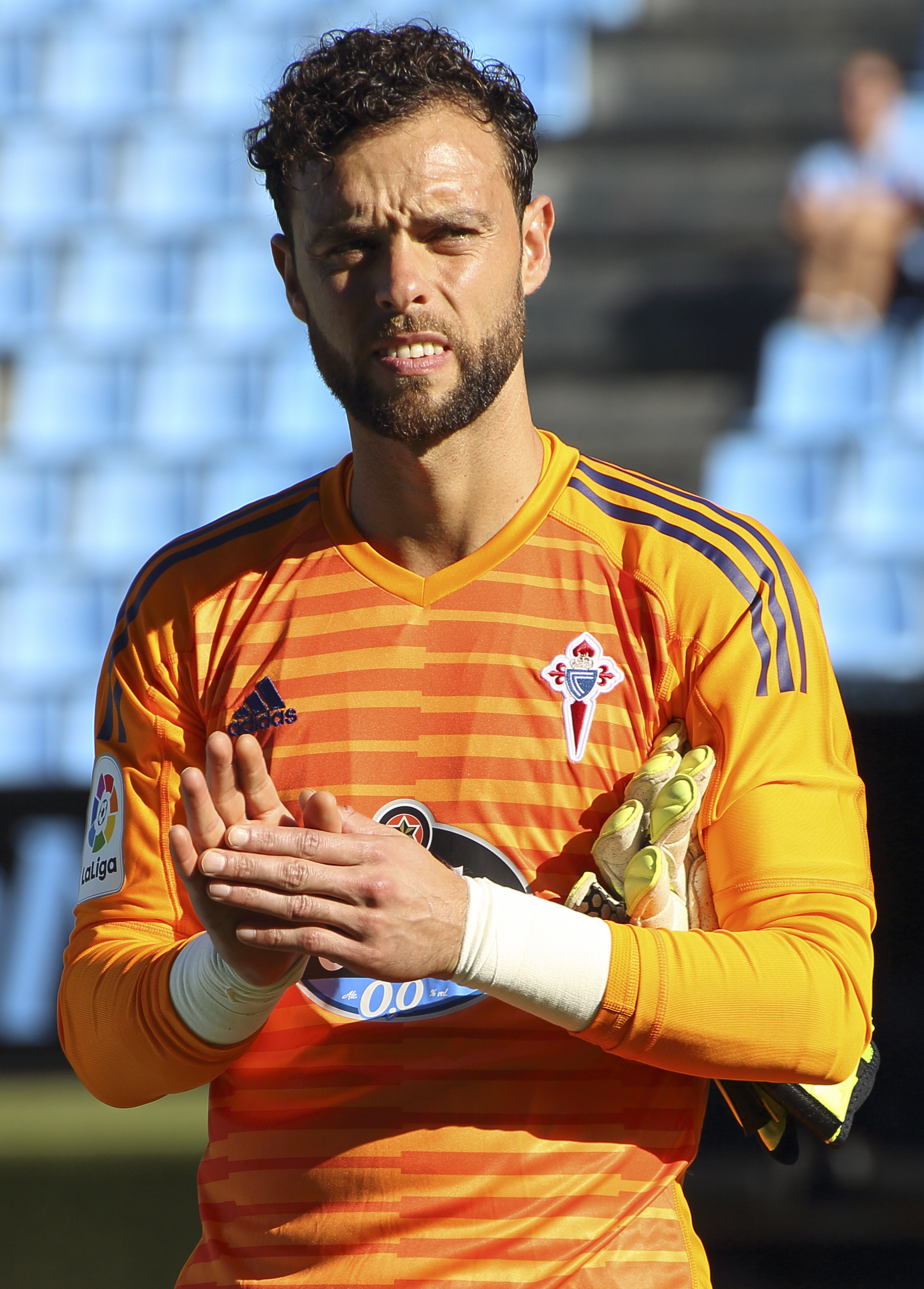
- Sergio with Celta in 2018

Personal information
- Full name: Sergio Álvarez Conde
- Date of birth: 3 August 1986 (age 40)
- Place of birth: Catoira, Spain
- Height: 1.79 m (5 ft 10 in)
- Position: Goalkeeper

Youth career
- Arosa
- 1999–2004: Celta

Senior career*
Years	Team	Apps	(Gls)
2004–2011	Celta B	167	(0)
2008–2009	→ Racing Ferrol (loan)	15	(0)
2011–2021	Celta	162	(0)
Total		344	(0)
- * Club domestic league appearances and goals

Sergio Álvarez Conde (born 3 August 1986), known simply as Sergio, is a Spanish former professional footballer who played as a goalkeeper.

He spent his entire career with Celta, making 197 competitive appearances.

== Club career ==
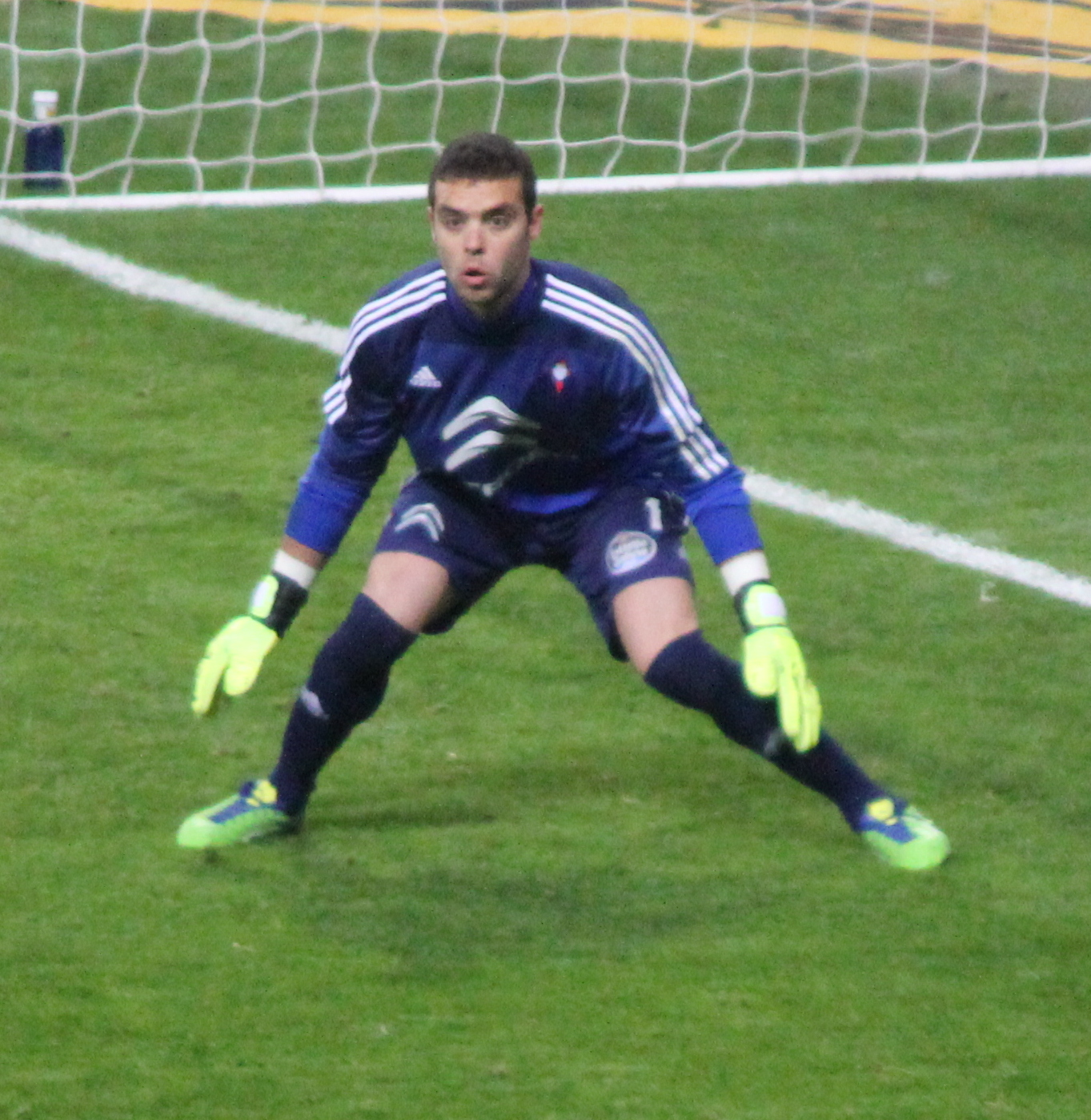
Sergio in action for Celta in 2012

Born in Catoira, Province of Pontevedra, Sergio began his career with local Arosa, joining Galician neighbours Celta de Vigo in 1999 at the age of 13. He made his senior debut with their reserves in Segunda División B, playing four full seasons in that tier and spending 2008–09 on loan to another club in that league and region, Racing de Ferrol.

Sergio made his debut for Celta's first team on 4 June 2011, in a 3–0 Segunda División home win against Cartagena, the last matchday of the campaign. Shortly after, following the starter Ismael Falcón's departure to Hércules, he was definitely promoted to the main squad, being awarded the #1 jersey.

Sergio played his first match in La Liga on 5 October 2012, keeping a clean sheet in the 2–0 home victory over Sevilla. He would spend the season as a backup to Javi Varas, however.

Varas subsequently returned to Sevilla from his loan but Sergio remained as understudy, behind fellow youth graduate Yoel. After the latter's departure to Valencia, he renewed his link until 2016 and was finally chosen as first choice.

On 1 November 2014, Sergio made a string of superb saves to deny Barcelona in a 1–0 win at the Camp Nou. He was also an important unit of the Célticos in a 2–0 home defeat of Atlético Madrid on 15 February of the following year, finishing the season between the posts.

In 2016–17, Sergio took part in his first European campaign, playing ten UEFA Europa League matches as Celta reached the semi-finals and lost 2–1 on aggregate to eventual champions Manchester United. The following campaign, under new manager Juan Carlos Unzué, he battled for the starting position against youngster Rubén Blanco.

Having made only two league appearances, Sergio suffered a meniscus injury to his right knee in May 2020; Celta used the emergency transfer allocation to sign attacker Nolito rather than another goalkeeper. On 20 May 2021, aged 34, he announced his retirement from professional football.

== Career statistics ==
Appearances and goals by club, season and competition
Club	Season	League			National Cup		Continental		Other		Total	
Club	Season	Division	Apps	Goals	Apps	Goals	Apps	Goals	Apps	Goals	Apps	Goals
Celta B	2004–05	Segunda División B	32	0	—		—		—		32	0
Celta B	2005–06	Segunda División B	16	0	—		—		—		16	0
Celta B	2006–07	Segunda División B	26	0	—		—		—		26	0
Celta B	2007–08	Segunda División B	29	0	—		—		—		29	0
Celta B	2009–10	Segunda División B	35	0	—		—		—		35	0
Celta B	2010–11	Segunda División B	29	0	—		—		—		29	0
Celta B	Total		167	0	—		—		—		167	0
Racing Ferrol (loan)	2008–09	Segunda División B	15	0	1	0	—		—		16	0
Celta	2009–10	Segunda División	0	0	0	0	—		—		0	0
Celta	2010–11	Segunda División	1	0	0	0	—		0	0	1	0
Celta	2011–12	Segunda División	19	0	4	0	—		—		23	0
Celta	2012–13	La Liga	2	0	4	0	—		—		6	0
Celta	2013–14	La Liga	3	0	1	0	—		—		4	0
Celta	2014–15	La Liga	38	0	0	0	—		—		38	0
Celta	2015–16	La Liga	31	0	1	0	—		—		32	0
Celta	2016–17	La Liga	36	0	8	0	10 (Note: Appearances in UEFA Europa League)	0	—		54	0
Celta	2017–18	La Liga	17	0	4	0	—		—		21	0
Celta	2018–19	La Liga	13	0	1	0	—		—		14	0
Celta	2019–20	La Liga	2	0	2	0	—		—		4	0
Celta	2020–21	La Liga	0	0	0	0	—		—		0	0
Celta	Total		162	0	25	0	10	0	0	0	197	0
Career total			344	0	26	0	10	0	0	0	380	0
