= Carles Planas =

Spanish footballer

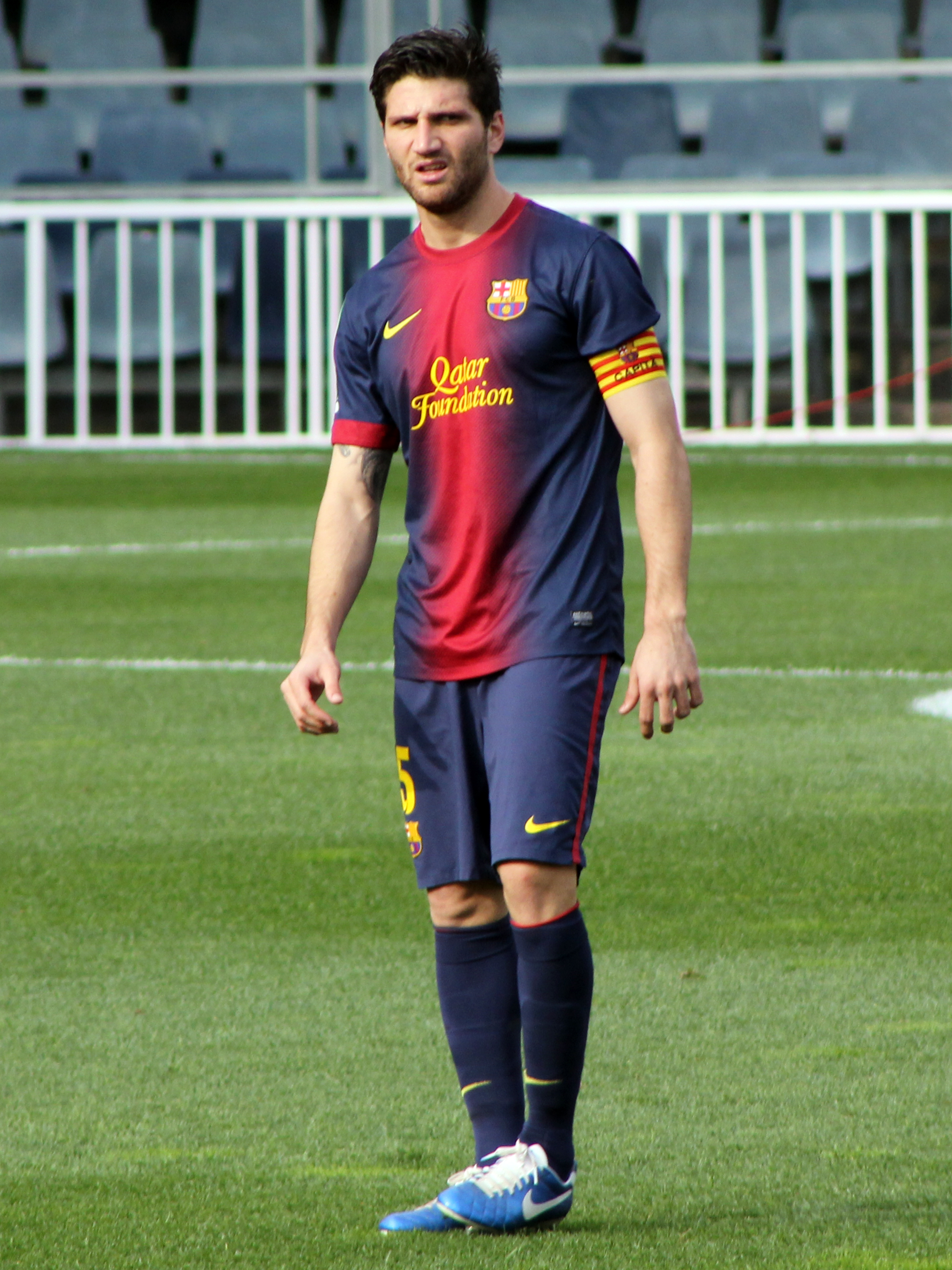
- Planas with Barcelona B in 2012

Personal information
- Full name: Carles Planas Antolínez
- Date of birth: 4 March 1991 (age 35)
- Place of birth: Sant Celoni, Spain
- Height: 1.73 m (5 ft 8 in)
- Position: Left-back

Youth career
- 1998–2000: Sant Celoni
- 2000–2010: Barcelona

Senior career*
Years	Team	Apps	(Gls)
2009–2014	Barcelona B	120	(2)
2012	Barcelona	0	(0)
2014–2017	Celta	49	(0)
2017–2019	Girona	12	(0)
2019–2021	AEK Larnaca	13	(1)
Total		194	(3)

International career
2007–2008	Spain U17	6	(0)
2009	Spain U18	2	(0)
2008–2010	Spain U19	12	(0)
2011	Spain U20	4	(0)
2011–2012	Spain U21	10	(0)
- * Club domestic league appearances and goals

Carles Planas Antolínez (born 4 March 1991) is a Spanish former professional footballer who played as a left-back.

== Club career ==
=== Barcelona ===
Born in Sant Celoni, Barcelona, Catalonia, Planas started playing football for his hometown club, moving to FC Barcelona's youth academy, La Masia, at age 9. After progressing through its ranks he was promoted to the reserves in 2009, going on to spend several seasons in the Segunda División with them.

In late November/early December 2012, Planas appeared in his only two competitive games with the first team: he made his debut in a 3–1 home win over Deportivo Alavés in the round of 32 of the Copa del Rey (6–1 on aggregate), featuring the last 20 minutes of the match in place of Adriano. The following week, as the Blaugrana were already qualified as first in their UEFA Champions League group, he started against S.L. Benfica in a 0–0 draw, also at the Camp Nou.

=== Celta ===
On 5 June 2014, Planas was released by Barcelona, but on the same day he joined RC Celta de Vigo on a three-year deal. He made his La Liga debut on 24 August, playing the entirety of the 3–1 home victory over Getafe CF.

Planas' contract was not extended at the end of the 2016–17 campaign, and he left Balaídos with 59 appearances in all competitions to his credit.

=== Girona ===
On 13 July 2017, free agent Planas signed a three-year contract with newly-promoted Girona FC. He spent the better part of his first season dealing with injury problems.

On 22 August 2019, after suffering relegation, Planas severed ties with the club.

=== AEK Larnaca ===
Immediately after leaving Girona, Planas joined AEK Larnaca FC of the Cypriot First Division. In June 2021, having often been injured and also criticised for his performances, he announced his retirement aged 30.

== Career statistics ==
Club	Season	League			Cup		Europe		Total	
Club	Season	Division	Apps	Goals	Apps	Goals	Apps	Goals	Apps	Goals
Barcelona B	2008–09	Segunda División B	1	0	—		—		1	0
Barcelona B	2009–10	Segunda División B	3	0	—		—		3	0
Barcelona B	2010–11	Segunda División	17	0	—		—		17	0
Barcelona B	2011–12	Segunda División	32	0	—		—		32	0
Barcelona B	2012–13	Segunda División	32	1	—		—		32	1
Barcelona B	2013–14	Segunda División	35	1	—		—		35	1
Barcelona B	Total		120	2	0	0	0	0	120	2
Barcelona	2012–13	La Liga	0	0	1	0	1 (Note: Appearance in UEFA Champions League)	0	2	0
Celta	2014–15	La Liga	11	0	3	0	0	0	14	0
Celta	2015–16	La Liga	26	0	5	0	0	0	31	0
Celta	2016–17	La Liga	12	0	0	0	2 (Note: Appearances in UEFA Europa League)	0	14	0
Celta	Total		49	0	8	0	2	0	59	0
Girona	2017–18	La Liga	5	0	2	0	—		7	0
Girona	2018–19	La Liga	7	0	0	0	—		7	0
Girona	Total		12	0	2	0	0	0	14	0
AEK Larnaca	2019–20	Cypriot First Division	13	1	2	0	—		15	1
AEK Larnaca	2020–21	Cypriot First Division	0	0	1	1	—		1	1
AEK Larnaca	Total		13	1	3	1	0	0	16	2
Career total			194	3	14	1	3	0	211	4
