= Nolito =

Spanish footballer (born 1986)

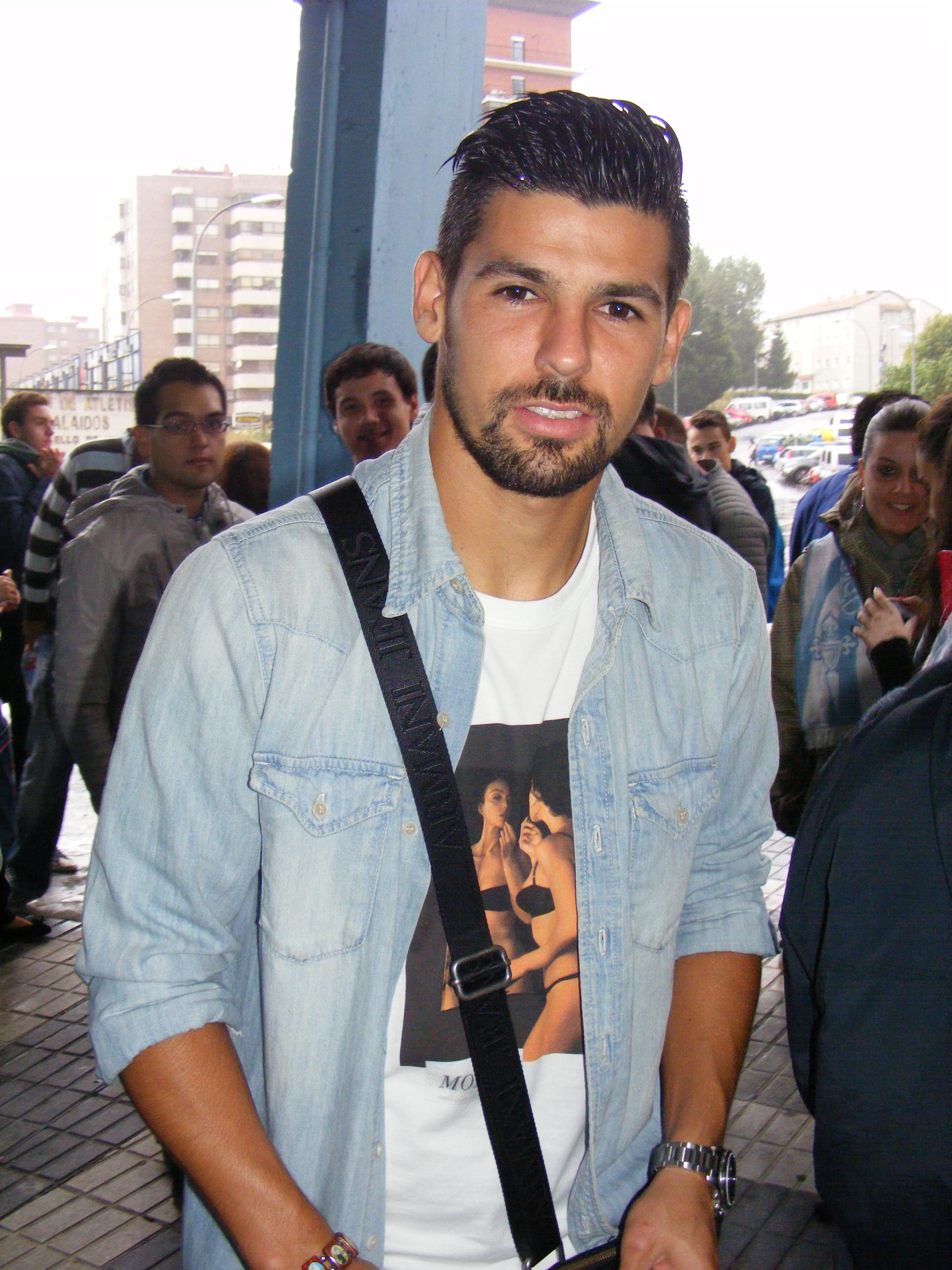
- Nolito in 2013

Personal information
- Full name: Manuel Agudo Durán
- Date of birth: 15 October 1986 (age 40)
- Place of birth: Sanlúcar de Barrameda, Spain
- Height: 1.75 m (5 ft 9 in)
- Positions: Winger; forward

Youth career
- 1990–2000: Algaida
- 2000–2002: Sanluqueño
- 2003–2005: Valencia

Senior career*
Years	Team	Apps	(Gls)
2002–2003	Sanluqueño		
2005–2006	Sanluqueño	32	(24)
2006–2008	Écija	71	(15)
2008–2011	Barcelona B	106	(29)
2010–2011	Barcelona	2	(0)
2011–2013	Benfica	35	(12)
2013	→ Granada (loan)	17	(3)
2013–2016	Celta	100	(39)
2016–2017	Manchester City	19	(4)
2017–2020	Sevilla	49	(7)
2020–2022	Celta	75	(11)
2022–2023	Ibiza	27	(1)
Total		533	(145)

International career
2014–2016	Spain	16	(6)
- * Club domestic league appearances and goals

Manuel Agudo Durán (Spanish pronunciation: [maˈnwel aˈɣuðo ðuˈɾan]; (Note: In isolation, Durán is pronounced [duˈɾan].) born 15 October 1986), known as Nolito ([noˈlito]), is a Spanish former professional footballer who played as a winger or a forward.

Having begun his career at lower league clubs he signed for Barcelona in 2008, playing predominantly with its reserves. He totalled 243 games and 60 goals in La Liga, where he also represented Granada, Celta and Sevilla. Abroad, he played two seasons for Benfica in Portugal, and one in the English Premier League with Manchester City.

Nolito made his debut for Spain in November 2014, representing the nation at Euro 2016.

== Club career ==
=== Early career ===
Born in Sanlúcar de Barrameda, Cádiz, Andalusia, Nolito began his career with UD Algaida in his hometown before joining Atlético Sanluqueño in 2000. He made his first-team debut in Tercera División with the latter club at the age of just 15, scoring on his debut, and moved to Valencia in 2003, where he wrapped up his formative years.

Nolito returned to Sanluqueño in 2005, and was their top scorer in the 2005–06 season with 27 goals (24 in the regular season). He then signed with Écija of the Segunda División B, where he scored in a 1–1 home draw against Real Madrid in the 2006–07 Copa del Rey.

=== Barcelona ===
Nolito arrived at Barcelona's youth academy at nearly 22 years of age, after scoring 13 times for Écija the previous campaign. With the Catalans' B team, also in the third tier, he scored 16 league goals over two seasons – 12 in the second– as the side returned to the Segunda División after an 11-year absence.

On 3 October 2010, Nolito made his La Liga debut for Barcelona, coming on as a substitute for Pedro in a 1–1 home draw against Mallorca. On 10 November, he opened the 5–1 home win over Ceuta in the round of 32 of the Copa del Rey (7–1 on aggregate).

=== Benfica ===
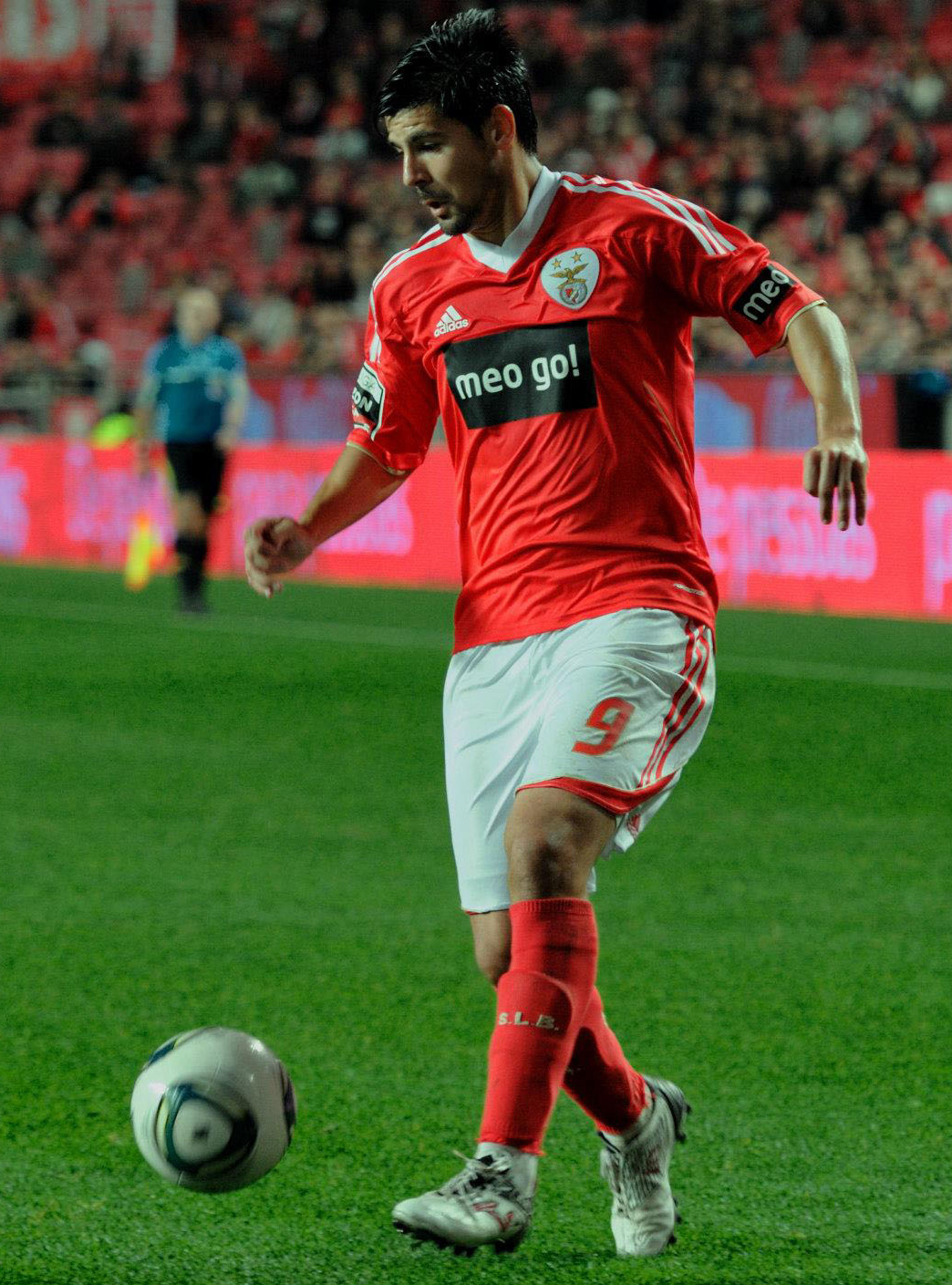
Nolito with Benfica in 2011

In late May 2011, Nolito rejected Barcelona's offer of a professional contract and instead signed a five-year deal with Portuguese club Benfica, effective as of 1 July. He scored on his official debut on the 27th, a 2–0 home win against Trabzonspor in the third qualifying round of the UEFA Champions League. He also netted in the second leg, a 1–1 draw.

On 20 August 2011, Nolito scored once in a 3–1 home victory over Feirense, making him alongside Eusébio the only player to score in his first five official matches. He managed 15 goals in 48 competitive appearances in his first season, helping his team to win the Taça da Liga.

Nolito returned to his country and his native region on 29 January 2013, being loaned to Granada for six months and a fee of €600,000, without the possibility of making the move permanent in June. In his first match, four days after signing, he took the corner which resulted in Cristiano Ronaldo's own goal for the game's only, giving Granada their first win over Real Madrid in 40 years.

=== Celta ===
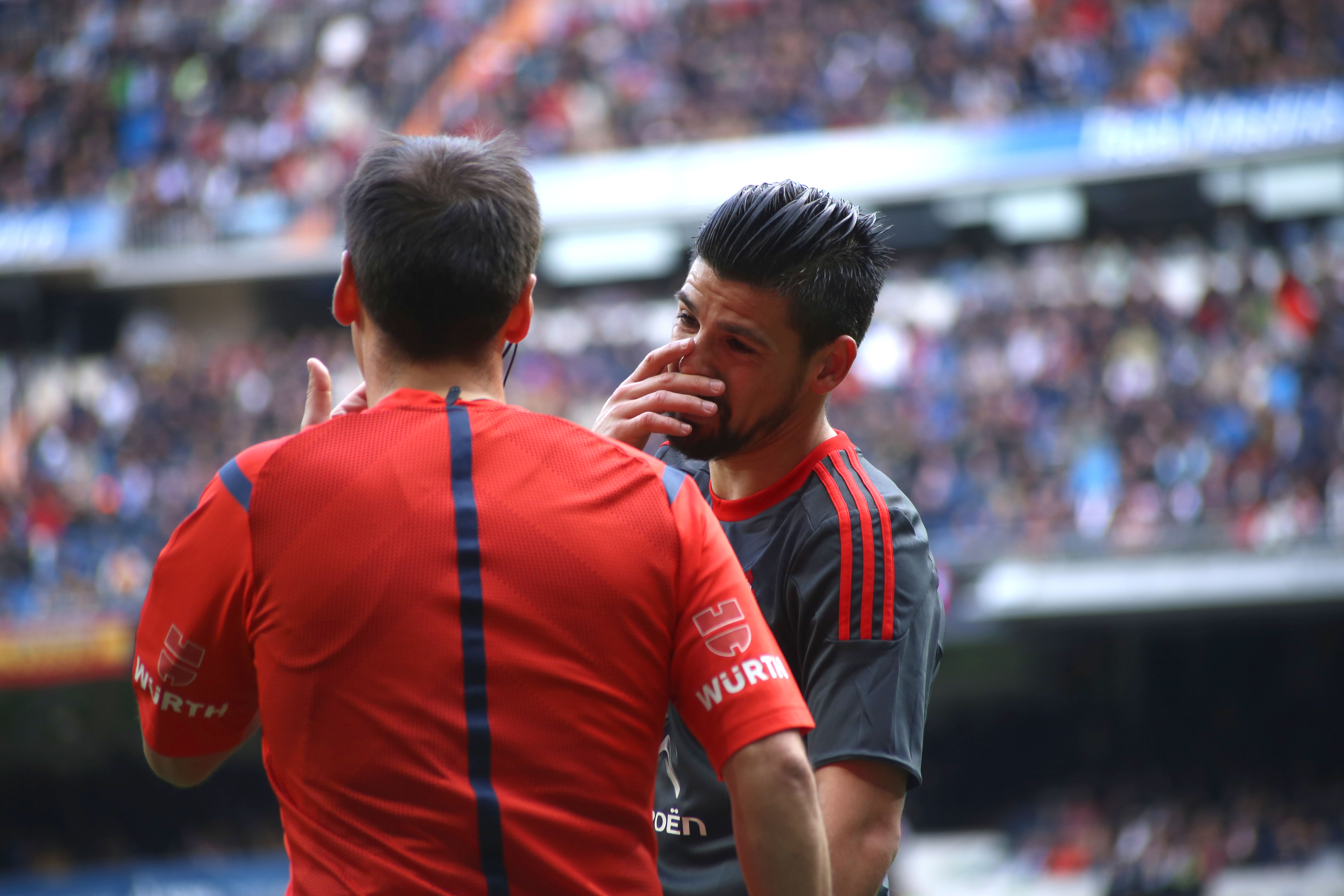
Nolito talking to an assistant referee in 2015

Nolito signed with Celta de Vigo on 1 July 2013, penning a four-year deal and reuniting with former Barcelona B boss Luis Enrique. He finished his debut campaign as team top scorer with 14.

Nolito was named La Liga Player of the Month for September 2014, with four goals during a month which ended with the side in sixth position. He created 96 scoring opportunities over the campaign, the most in the Spanish league and fourth most in Europe's five leading leagues.

On 23 September 2015, Nolito took his league tally to five after scoring once and providing two assists for Iago Aspas in a 4–1 home defeat of former club Barcelona. He totalled three goals and an assist that month to help them remain unbeaten, earning him a second Player of the Month accolade. In mid-December, however, he suffered a hamstring injury against Espanyol which sidelined him for two months.

Nolito returned to action on 20 February 2016, featuring roughly 20 minutes in a 3–2 home win over Eibar. In the following round, he scored the game's only goal at Getafe, and Celta eventually finished in sixth place.

=== Manchester City ===
On 1 July 2016, Nolito signed with Premier League side Manchester City on a four-year deal for a fee of £13.8 million. He made his debut on 13 August, playing 59 minutes in a 2–1 home victory against Sunderland. Three days later he scored his first goal, and also provided an assist to Sergio Agüero in a 5–0 away rout of Steaua București in the Champions League play-off round.

Nolito made a few appearances during his time in Manchester, but he and his family were unsettled by life in England.

=== Sevilla ===
In July 2017, Sevilla signed Nolito on a three-year contract. He spent the better part of 2018–19 on the sidelines, nursing a fibula injury.

=== Return to Celta ===
On 18 June 2020, Nolito rejoined Celta on a reported one-year deal. His Sevilla contract was set to expire at the end of the month, and the former were granted an emergency exception to acquire him outside of the transfer window because of a long-term injury to goalkeeper Sergio Álvarez. Three days later, in his first game back, he came off the bench to assist Santi Mina and score a penalty in a 6–0 home thrashing of Alavés.

=== Ibiza ===
On 5 September 2022, Nolito joined second-tier Ibiza on a free transfer, on a two-year deal. He played 28 times in his only season as the Balearic side were relegated, scoring just once in a 3–2 home win over Lugo on 2 October.

Nolito's contract was terminated in June 2023, and he announced his retirement at 36 on 13 September.

== International career ==
Nolito did not earn a single cap for Spain at youth level. On 7 November 2014, he was called up by full side manager Vicente del Bosque for a UEFA Euro 2016 qualifier against Belarus and a friendly with Germany. He made his debut against the latter on the 18th, starting at his club ground of Balaídos Stadium in a 1–0 loss.

On 17 May 2016, Nolito was named in the preliminary squad for the final tournament in France. Twelve days later, in a friendly against Bosnia and Herzegovina, he scored his first goals, striking twice in the first half of a 3–1 win in Switzerland. he repeated the feat the following match, a 6–1 rout of South Korea in Austria.

Selected for the squad of 23, Nolito acted often as starter, scoring from close range in a 3–0 group stage victory over Turkey at the Stade de Nice and also assisting Álvaro Morata for the opener.

== Career statistics ==
=== Club ===
Appearances and goals by club, season and competition
Club	Season	League			National cup (Note: Includes Copa del Rey, Taça de Portugal, FA Cup)		League cup (Note: Includes Taça da Liga, EFL Cup)		Europe		Total	
Club	Season	Division	Apps	Goals	Apps	Goals	Apps	Goals	Apps	Goals	Apps	Goals
Écija	2006–07	Segunda División B	31	2	5	3	—		—		36	5
Écija	2007–08	Segunda División B	40	13	0	0	—		—		40	13
Écija	Total		71	15	5	3	—		—		76	18
Barcelona B	2008–09	Segunda División B	28	4	—		—		—		28	4
Barcelona B	2009–10	Segunda División B	40	12	—		—		—		40	12
Barcelona B	2010–11	Segunda División	38	13	—		—		—		38	13
Barcelona B	Total		106	29	—		—		—		106	29
Barcelona	2010–11	La Liga	2	0	3	1	—		0	0	5	1
Benfica	2011–12	Primeira Liga	29	11	3	0	4	1	12 (Note: Appearances in UEFA Champions League)	3	48	15
Benfica	2012–13	Primeira Liga	6	1	3	0	3	0	3	0	15	1
Benfica	Total		35	12	6	0	7	1	15	3	63	16
Granada	2012–13	La Liga	17	3	—		—		—		17	3
Celta	2013–14	La Liga	35	14	2	0	—		—		37	14
Celta	2014–15	La Liga	36	13	1	0	—		—		37	13
Celta	2015–16	La Liga	29	12	0	0	—		—		29	12
Celta	Total		100	39	3	0	—		—		103	39
Manchester City	2016–17	Premier League	19	4	4	0	1	0	6	2	30	6
Sevilla	2017–18	La Liga	30	4	5	1	—		7	0	42	5
Sevilla	2018–19	La Liga	4	0	3	1	—		10 (Note: Appearances in UEFA Europa League)	4	17	5
Sevilla	2019–20	La Liga	15	3	3	2	—		2	0	20	5
Sevilla	Total		49	7	11	4	—		19	4	79	15
Celta	2019–20	La Liga	7	2	—		—		—		7	2
Celta	2020–21	La Liga	36	7	1	2	—		—		37	9
Celta	2021–22	La Liga	32	2	3	0	—		—		35	2
Celta	Total		75	11	4	2	—		—		79	13
Ibiza	2022–23	Segunda División	27	1	1	0	—		—		28	1
Career total			501	121	37	10	8	1	40	9	586	141

=== International ===
Appearances and goals by national team and year
National team	Year	Apps	Goals
Spain
Spain	2014	1	0
Spain	2015	4	0
Spain	2016	11	6
Total		16	6

Scores and results list Spain's goal tally first, score column indicates score after each Nolito goal.

List of international goals scored by Nolito
No.	Date	Venue	Cap	Opponent	Score	Result	Competition
1	29 May 2016	AFG Arena, St. Gallen, Switzerland	7	Bosnia and Herzegovina	1–0	3–1	Friendly
2	29 May 2016	AFG Arena, St. Gallen, Switzerland	7	Bosnia and Herzegovina	2–0	3–1	Friendly
3	1 June 2016	Red Bull Arena, Salzburg, Austria	8	South Korea	3–0	6–1	Friendly
4	1 June 2016	Red Bull Arena, Salzburg, Austria	8	South Korea	5–0	6–1	Friendly
5	17 June 2016	Stade de Nice, Nice, France	11	Turkey	2–0	3–0	UEFA Euro 2016
6	9 October 2016	Loro Boriçi Stadium, Shkodër, Albania	15	Albania	2–0	2–0	2018 FIFA World Cup qualification

== Honours ==
Barcelona

- La Liga: 2010–11

Benfica

- Taça da Liga: 2011–12

Sevilla

- UEFA Europa League: 2019–20

Individual

- La Liga Player of the Month: September 2014, September 2015
