= Borja Fernández (footballer, born 1995) =

Spanish footballer

Personal information
- Full name: Borja Fernández Fernández
- Date of birth: 16 August 1995 (age 31)
- Place of birth: Vigo, Spain
- Height: 1.78 m (5 ft 10 in)
- Position: Midfielder

Team information
- Current team: Europa
- Number: 44

Youth career
- Celta

Senior career*
| Years | Team | Apps | (Gls) |
| 2013–2017 | Celta B | 112 | (9) |
| 2014–2018 | Celta | 10 | (0) |
| 2017–2018 | → Reus (loan) | 19 | (1) |
| 2018–2019 | Miedź Legnica | 30 | (0) |
| 2019–2021 | Asteras Tripolis | 40 | (0) |
| 2021–2024 | Algeciras | 97 | (5) |
| 2024–2025 | Ponferradina | 13 | (1) |
| 2025–2026 | Lincoln Red Imps | 8 | (0) |
| 2026– | Europa | 8 | (0) |

International career
| 2013 | Spain U19 | 3 | (0) |
- * Club domestic league appearances and goals as of 20 September 2026

Borja Fernández Fernández (born 16 August 1995) is a Spanish professional footballer who plays for Gibraltarian club Europa as a central midfielder.

== Club career ==
Born in Vigo, Galicia, Fernández played youth football with his hometown club RC Celta de Vigo, and signed a four-year professional contract on 26 February 2013. He made his senior debut with the reserves in the 2013–14 season, in the Segunda División B.

Fernández made his first-team – and La Liga – debut on 24 August 2014, starting in a 3–1 home win against Getafe CF. The following day, he extended his contract until 2019.

On 20 July 2017, Fernández was loaned to Segunda División side CF Reus Deportiu for one year. He scored his only goal as a professional on 22 October, being essential as the visitors beat UD Almería 1–0.

On 7 August 2018, Fernández terminated his contract with Celta. In the following years, he played abroad with Miedź Legnica (Poland) and Asteras Tripolis FC (Greece).
