= Samu Araújo =

Spanish footballer

Personal information
- Full name: Samuel Araújo Fernández
- Date of birth: 9 December 1995 (age 30)
- Place of birth: Vigo, Spain
- Height: 1.69 m (5 ft 6 1/2 in)
- Position: Left-back

Team information
- Current team: Boiro

Youth career
- Celta

Senior career*
Years	Team	Apps	(Gls)
2013–2017	Celta B	93	(2)
2015–2018	Celta	0	(0)
2017–2018	→ Barcelona B (loan)	1	(0)
2018–2019	Atlético Madrid B	35	(2)
2019–2020	Arka Gdynia	0	(0)
2020–2021	Cultural Leonesa	18	(1)
2021–2023	Pontevedra	47	(0)
2023–2024	Compostela	11	(0)
2025	Coruxo	11	(0)
2025–	Boiro	4	(0)
- * Club domestic league appearances and goals as of 28 September 2025

Samuel "Samu" Araújo Fernández (born 9 December 1995) is a Spanish professional footballer who plays as a left-back for Tercera Federación club Boiro.

== Club career ==
Born in Vigo, Galicia, Samu played youth football with local Celta de Vigo, signing a new three-year deal on 12 July 2013. He made his senior debut with the B-team on 27 October 2013, starting in a 2–2 home draw against SD Logroñés in the Segunda División B.

Samu made his first-team debut on 14 January 2015, starting and playing the full 90 minutes in a 2–0 away win against Athletic Bilbao, in the season's Copa del Rey. On 9 July 2017 he moved to another reserve team, after agreeing to a one-year loan deal with FC Barcelona B.

On 21 June 2018, after featuring in only one match while on loan, Samu terminated his contract with Celta.
