= 2017–18 Real Oviedo season =

Real Oviedo
2017–18 season
- President: Jorge Menéndez
- Head coach: Juan Antonio Anquela
- Stadium: Carlos Tartiere
- Segunda División: 7th
- Copa del Rey: Second round
- Top goalscorer: League: Miguel Linares (10); All: Miguel Linares (10)
- Highest home attendance: 25,996 (vs Sporting Gijón)
- Lowest home attendance: 10,312 (vs Reus Deportiu)
| Home colours | Away colours |

The 2017–18 season is the 35th season in Segunda División played by Real Oviedo, a Spanish football club based in Oviedo, Asturias. It covers a period from 1 July 2017 to 30 June 2018.

== Players ==
=== Squad information ===
| No. | Name | Nat. | Place of Birth | Date of Birth (Age) | Signed From | Since | Transfer Fee | End |
Goalkeepers
| 1 | Alfonso Herrero | (Spain) (Castilla–La Mancha) | Toledo | 21 April 1994 (age 31) | Real Oviedo Vetusta | 2016 | Free | 2019 |
| 13 | Juan Carlos | (Spain) (Balearic Islands) | Calvià | 27 July 1987 (age 38) | Albacete | 2016 | Free | 2018 |
Defenders
| 2 | Diego Johannesson | (Iceland) (Spain) (Asturias) | Villaviciosa | 3 October 1993 (age 32) | Real Oviedo Vetusta | 2011 | Free | 2019 |
| 3 | Francisco Varela | (Spain) (Andalusia) | Atarfe | 26 October 1994 (age 31) | Betis | 2016 | Free | 2018 |
| 4 | Héctor Verdés | (Spain) (Valencian Community) | Villar del Arzobispo | 24 June 1984 (age 41) | Alcorcón | 2015 | Free | 2019 |
| 5 | Juan Forlín | (Argentina) (Spain) | (Argentina) Reconquista | 10 January 1988 (age 38) | (Mexico) Querétaro | 2017 | Free | 2019 |
| 6 | Carlos Hernández | (Spain) (Andalusia) | Jaén | 15 September 1990 (age 35) | Lugo | 2017 | Free | 2019 |
| 18 | Christian Fernández | (Spain) (Cantabria) | Santander | 15 October 1985 (age 40) | Las Palmas | 2016 | Free | 2018 |
| 19 | Nahuel Valentini | (Argentina) (Italy) | (Argentina) Rosario | 16 November 1988 (age 37) | (Italy) Spezia | 2017 | Free | 2019 |
| 20 | Guillermo Cotugno | (Uruguay) (Italy) | (Uruguay) Montevideo | 17 March 1995 (age 31) | (Russia) Rubin Kazan | 2017 | Free | 2019 |
| 23 | Mossa | (Spain) (Valencian Community) | Valencia | 24 January 1989 (age 37) | Gimnàstic | 2017 | Unknown | 2019 |
Midfielders
| 7 | Aarón Ñíguez | (Spain) (Valencian Community) | Elche | 26 April 1989 (age 36) | Tenerife | 2017 | Free | 2019 |
| 8 | Ramón Folch | (Spain) (Catalonia) | Reus | 4 October 1989 (age 36) | Reus | 2017 | Free | 2019 |
| 11 | Matej Pučko | (Slovenia) | (Slovenia) Murska Sobota | 6 October 1993 (age 32) | (Slovenia) Koper | 2017 | Free | 2019 |
| 15 | McDonald Mariga | (Kenya) | (Kenya) Nairobi | 4 April 1987 (age 39) | (Italy) Latina | 2017 | Free | 2018 |
| 17 | Patrik Hidi | (Hungary) | (Hungary) Győr | 27 November 1990 (age 35) | (Hungary) Honvéd | 2017 | Free | 2019 |
| 21 | Saúl Berjón | (Spain) (Asturias) | Oviedo | 24 May 1986 (age 39) | (Mexico) UNAM | 2017 | Free | 2019 |
| 22 | David Rocha | (Spain) (Extremadura) | Cáceres | 7 February 1985 (age 41) | (United States) Houston Dynamo | 2016 | Free | 2018 |
Forwards
| 9 | Toché | (Spain) (Region of Murcia) | Santomera | 1 January 1983 (age 43) | Deportivo La Coruña | 2015 | Free | 2018 |
| 10 | Miguel Linares | (Spain) (Aragon) | Zaragoza | 30 September 1982 (age 43) | Recreativo | 2014 | Free | 2018 |
| 14 | Yaw Yeboah | (Ghana) | (Ghana) Accra | 28 March 1997 (age 29) | (England) Manchester City | 2017 | Loan | 2018 |
| 16 | Diego Fabbrini | (Italy) | (Italy) San Giuliano Terme | 31 July 1990 (age 35) | (England) Birmingham City | 2017 | Loan | 2018 |
| 24 | Olmes García | (Colombia) | (Colombia) Barranquilla | 21 October 1992 (age 33) | (Colombia) América de Cali | 2018 | Loan | 2018 |

== Transfers ==
=== In ===
| No. | Pos. | Nat. | Name | Age | EU | Moving from | Type | Transfer window | Ends | Transfer fee | Source |
|---|---|---|---|---|---|---|---|---|---|---|---|
| 6 | DF | (Spain) | Carlos Hernández | 26 | EU | Lugo | Transfer | Summer | 2019 | Free | RealOviedo.es |
| 8 | MF | (Spain) | Ramón Folch | 27 | EU | Reus | Transfer | Summer | 2019 | Free | RealOviedo.es |
| 1 | GK | (Spain) | Alfonso Herrero | 23 | EU | Real Oviedo Vetusta | Promoted | Summer | 2019 | Youth system | |
| 7 | FW | (Spain) | Aarón Ñíguez | 28 | EU | Tenerife | Transfer | Summer | 2019 | Free | RealOviedo.es |
| 19 | DF | (Argentina) | Nahuel Valentini | 28 | EU | (Italy) Spezia | Transfer | Summer | 2019 | Free | RealOviedo.es |
| 11 | FW | (Slovenia) | Matej Pučko | 23 | EU | (Slovenia) Koper | Transfer | Summer | 2019 | Free | RealOviedo.es |
| 16 | FW | (Italy) | Diego Fabbrini | 26 | EU | (England) Birmingham City | Loan | Summer | 2018 | Free | RealOviedo.es |
| 23 | DF | (Spain) | Mossa | 28 | EU | Gimnàstic | Transfer | Summer | 2019 | Undisclosed | RealOviedo.es |
| 15 | MF | (Kenya) | McDonald Mariga | 30 | Non-EU | (Italy) Latina | Transfer | Summer | 2018 | Free | RealOviedo.es |
| 20 | DF | (Uruguay) | Guillermo Cotugno | 22 | EU | (Russia) Rubin Kazan | Transfer | Summer | 2019 | Free | RealOviedo.es |
| 17 | MF | (Hungary) | Patrik Hidi | 26 | EU | (Hungary) Honvéd | Transfer | Summer | 2019 | Free | RealOviedo.es |
| 5 | DF | (Argentina) | Juan Forlín | 29 | EU | (Mexico) Querétaro | Transfer | Summer | 2019 | Free | RealOviedo.es |
| 14 | FW | (Ghana) | Yaw Yeboah | 20 | Non-EU | (England) Manchester City | Loan | Summer | 2018 | Free | RealOviedo.es |
| 24 | FW | (Colombia) | Olmes García | 25 | Non-EU | (Colombia) América de Cali | Loan | Winter | 2018 | Free | RealOviedo.es |

=== Out ===
| No. | Pos. | Nat. | Name | Age | EU | Moving to | Type | Transfer window | Transfer fee | Source |
|---|---|---|---|---|---|---|---|---|---|---|
| 15 | MF | (Spain) | Lucas Torró | 22 | EU | Real Madrid Castilla | Loan Return | Summer | | RealOviedo.es |
| 19 | DF | (Spain) | David Costas | 22 | EU | Celta | Loan return | Summer | | RealOviedo.es |
| 22 | MF | (Spain) | Nando García | 23 | EU | Valencia | Loan Return | Summer | | RealOviedo.es |
| 23 | MF | (Uruguay) | Carlos de Pena | 25 | EU | (England) Middlesbrough | Loan return | Summer | | RealOviedo.es |
| 24 | DF | (Spain) | Óscar Gil | 22 | EU | Bilbao Athletic | Loan Return | Summer | | RealOviedo.es |
| 25 | MF | (Spain) | Borja Domínguez | 25 | EU | Córdoba | Loan return | Summer | | RealOviedo.es |
| 1 | GK | (Spain) | Esteban | 42 | EU | | Contract Ended | Summer | | RealOviedo.es |
| 8 | FW | (Spain) | Michu | 31 | EU | | Retirement | Summer | | RealOviedo.es |
| 17 | DF | (Spain) | José Manuel Fernández | 27 | EU | Córdoba | Transfer | Summer | Free | CórdobaCF Twitter |
| 11 | FW | (Spain) | Jonathan Pereira | 30 | EU | Alcorcón | Transfer | Summer | Free | ADAlcorcon.com |
| 5 | DF | (Spain) | David Fernández | 32 | EU | Alcorcón | Transfer | Summer | Free | ADAlcorcon.com |
| 4 | MF | (Spain) | Jonathan Vila | 31 | EU | Recreativo | Transfer | Summer | Free | RecreativoHuelva.com |
| 7 | MF | (Spain) | Néstor Susaeta | 32 | EU | Albacete | Transfer | Summer | Free | AlbaceteBalompie.es |
| 6 | MF | (Spain) | Jon Erice | 30 | EU | Albacete | Transfer | Summer | Free | AlbaceteBalompie.es |
| 12 | MF | (Spain) | Héctor Nespral | 24 | EU | Langreo | Transfer | Summer | Free | UPLangreo Twitter |
| 16 | MF | (Spain) | Jorge Ortiz | 23 | EU | | Contract Termination | Summer | | RealOviedo.es |

== staff ==
=== Technical Staff ===
| Position | Staff |
|---|---|
| Head coach | Juan Antonio Anquela |
| Assistant coach | Juanjo Carretero |
| Physical trainer | Marcos Marcén |
| Analytical Assistant | Dani Mayo |
| Goalkeeping coach | Sergio Segura |

Last updated: 22 July 2016
Source: Real Oviedo Website

=== Medical Staff ===
| Position | Staff |
|---|---|
| Doctor | Manuel Rodríguez |
| Physiotherapist | Gabriel Díaz Peláez |
| Readaptador | Ignacio Gonzalo |

Last updated: 22 July 2016
Source: Real Oviedo Website

=== Delegate and Material Manager ===
| Position | Staff |
|---|---|
| Material manager | Silvino Aparicio |
| Team delegate | Dani Bautista |

Last updated: 22 July 2016
Source: Real Oviedo Website

== Pre-season and friendlies ==
Win Draw Loss Fixtures

| 15 July 2017 Friendly | Oviedo | 5–1 | Real Oviedo Vetusta | Oviedo |
| 18:30 CEST | Linares 18', 42', 44'; Toché 49'; Asier 63' | Report | Javi Mier 52' | Stadium: El Requexón; Attendance: 1000 |

| 19 July 2017 Friendly | Lealtad | 0–0 | Oviedo | Villaviciosa |
| 19:00 CEST | | Report | | Stadium: Les Caleyes |

| 22 July 2017 Emma Cuervo Trophy | Lugo | 0–1 | Oviedo | Ribadeo |
| 19:30 CEST | | Report | Aarón Ñíguez 76' | Stadium: Pepe Barrera |

| 26 July 2017 Friendly | Ponferradina | 1–1 | Oviedo | Ponferrada |
| 20:30 CEST | Menudo 77' | Report | Toché 56' | Stadium: El Toralín |

| 29 July 2017 Friendly | Cultural Leonesa | 0–0 | Oviedo | León |
| 20:30 CEST | | Report | | Stadium: Puente Castro |

| 3 August 2017 Friendly | Oviedo | 0–0 | Deportivo La Coruña | Oviedo |
| 20:30 CEST | | Report | | Stadium: Carlos Tartiere |

| 5 August 2017 Friendly | Eibar | 1–0 | Oviedo | Torrelavega |
| 19:00 CEST | Kike García 49' (pen.) | Report | | Stadium: Malecón |

| 11 August 2017 Friendly | Mirandés | 2–2 | Oviedo | Miranda de Ebro |
| 19:00 CEST | Pito Camacho 73'; Yanis 83' | Report | Miguel Linares 20', 50' (pen.) | Stadium: Anduva |

| 12 August 2017 Ramón Losada Trophy | Oviedo | 1–0 | Valladolid | Luarca |
| 19:00 CEST | Jorge Ortiz 20' | Report | | Stadium: La Veigona |

| 18 October 2017 Friendly | Langreo | 0–2 | Oviedo | Langreo |
| 19:00 CEST | | Report | Miguel Linares 16'; Sandoval 75' | Stadium: Nuevo Ganzábal |

== Competitions ==
=== Segunda División ===
| Pos | Team | Pld | W | D | L | GF | GA | GD | Pts | Promotion, qualification or relegation |
|---|---|---|---|---|---|---|---|---|---|---|
| 5 | Valladolid (O, P) | 42 | 19 | 10 | 13 | 69 | 55 | +14 | 67 | Qualification for promotion play-offs |
| 6 | Numancia | 42 | 18 | 11 | 13 | 52 | 41 | +11 | 65 (Note: Numancia finished ahead of Oviedo on head-to-head goal difference: Oviedo 3–1 Numancia, Numancia 3–0 Oviedo) | Qualification for promotion play-offs |
| 7 | Oviedo | 42 | 18 | 11 | 13 | 54 | 48 | +6 | 65 | |
| 8 | Osasuna | 42 | 16 | 16 | 10 | 44 | 34 | +10 | 64 (Note: Osasuna finished ahead of Cádiz on head-to-head points: Cádiz 0–2 Osasuna, Osasuna 1–0 Cádiz) | |
| 9 | Cádiz | 42 | 16 | 16 | 10 | 42 | 29 | +13 | 64 | |

Source: La Liga
Rules for classification: 1) points; 2) head-to-head points; 3) head-to-head goal difference; 4) goal difference; 5) number of goals scored
(O) Play-off winners; (P) Promoted

==== Results summary ====
| Overall | | | | | | | | Home | | | | | | Away | | | | | |
| Pld | W | D | L | GF | GA | GD | Pts | W | D | L | GF | GA | GD | W | D | L | GF | GA | GD |
|---|---|---|---|---|---|---|---|---|---|---|---|---|---|---|---|---|---|---|---|
| 42 | 18 | 11 | 13 | 54 | 48 | +6 | 65 | 14 | 4 | 3 | 35 | 17 | +18 | 4 | 7 | 10 | 19 | 31 | −12 |

Last updated: 9 June 2018.
Source: LaLiga.es

==== Result round by round ====
| Round | 1 | 2 | 3 | 4 | 5 | 6 | 7 | 8 | 9 | 10 | 11 | 12 | 13 | 14 | 15 | 16 | 17 | 18 | 19 | 20 | 21 | 22 | 23 | 24 | 25 | 26 | 27 | 28 | 29 | 30 | 31 | 32 | 33 | 34 | 35 | 36 | 37 | 38 | 39 | 40 | 41 | 42 |
|---|---|---|---|---|---|---|---|---|---|---|---|---|---|---|---|---|---|---|---|---|---|---|---|---|---|---|---|---|---|---|---|---|---|---|---|---|---|---|---|---|---|---|
| Ground | H | A | H | A | H | A | H | A | H | A | H | A | H | A | A | H | A | H | A | H | A | A | H | A | H | A | H | A | H | A | H | A | H | A | H | H | A | H | A | H | A | H |
| Result | L | D | W | D | W | L | D | D | D | L | W | L | W | W | L | W | W | W | W | W | D | D | W | D | W | L | D | L | D | L | W | D | L | W | W | L | L | W | L | W | L | W |
| Position | 16 | 16 | 9 | 10 | 7 | 12 | 13 | 14 | 14 | 16 | 12 | 15 | 11 | 10 | 11 | 10 | 7 | 7 | 5 | 3 | 3 | 3 | 3 | 3 | 3 | 4 | 5 | 5 | 6 | 8 | 7 | 7 | 10 | 8 | 6 | 7 | 7 | 7 | 9 | 8 | 9 | 7 |

Updated to match(es) played on 9 June 2018. Source: LaLiga.es
A = Away; H = Home; W = Win; D = Draw; L = Loss

==== Matches ====
Win Draw Loss Fixtures

| 20 August 2017 1 | Oviedo | 2–3 | Rayo Vallecano | Oviedo |
| 19:00 CEST | Saúl Berjón 11', 73' | Report | Amaya 16'; A. Embarba 40'; Diego Aguirre 59' | Stadium: Carlos Tartiere; Attendance: 12,330; Referee: Adrián Cordero Vega (Spain) |

| 26 August 2017 2 | Almería | 1–1 | Oviedo | Almería |
| 22:00 CEST | Pozo 58' | Report | Saúl Berjón 55' | Stadium: Juegos Mediterráneos; Attendance: 6,899; Referee: Eduardo Prieto Iglesias (Spain) |

| 3 September 2017 3 | Oviedo | 3–0 | Reus | Oviedo |
| 18:00 CEST | Toché 27', 48'; David Rocha 88' | Report | | Stadium: Carlos Tartiere; Attendance: 10,312; Referee: Santiago Varón Aceitón (Spain) |

| 9 September 2017 4 | Sporting Gijón | 1–1 | Oviedo | Gijón |
| 18:00 CEST | Carmona 13' | Report | Toché 85' | Stadium: El Molinón; Attendance: 27,506; Referee: Guillermo Cuadra Fernández (Spain) |

| 17 September 2017 5 | Oviedo | 1–0 | Cádiz | Oviedo |
| 18:00 CEST | Toché 64' | Report | | Stadium: Carlos Tartiere; Attendance: 15,141; Referee: Óliver de la Fuente Ramos (Spain) |

| 24 September 2017 6 | Albacete | 2–1 | Oviedo | Albacete |
| 18:00 CEST | Jérémie Bela 71'; Quim Araujo 75' | Report | Christian 66' | Stadium: Carlos Belmonte; Attendance: 7,019; Referee: Aitor Gorostegui Fernández-Ortega (Spain) |

| 2 October 2017 7 | Oviedo | 2–2 | Zaragoza | Oviedo |
| 21:00 CEST | Aarón 5'; Toché 28' | Report | Mikel González 31'; Zapater 39' | Stadium: Carlos Tartiere; Attendance: 11,279; Referee: Juan Luis Pulido Santana (Spain) |

| 8 October 2017 8 | Barcelona B | 1–1 | Oviedo | Barcelona |
| 18:00 CEST | José Arnaiz 40' | Report | Carlos Hernández 55' | Stadium: Mini Estadi; Attendance: 2,690; Referee: Jorge Figueroa Vázquez (Spain) |

| 11 October 2017 9 | Oviedo | 1–1 | Tenerife | Oviedo |
| 21:00 CEST | Saúl Berjón 19' | Report | Juan Villar 67' | Stadium: Carlos Tartiere; Attendance: 13,267; Referee: Daniel Ocón Arráiz (Spain) |

| 14 October 2017 10 | Granada | 2–0 | Oviedo | Granada |
| 18:00 CEST | Christian 4' (o.g.); Joselu 47' | Report | | Stadium: Nuevo Los Cármenes; Attendance: 11,704; Referee: Saúl Ais Reig (Spain) |

| 22 October 2017 11 | Oviedo | 2–0 | Córdoba | Oviedo |
| 12:00 CEST | Sergi Guardiola 59' (o.g.); Johannesson 90+4' | Report | | Stadium: Carlos Tartiere; Attendance: 12,948; Referee: Álvaro Moreno Aragón (Spain) |

| 29 October 2017 12 | Alcorcón | 2–0 | Oviedo | Alcorcón |
| 18:00 CET | Álvaro 41'; Laure 60' | Report | | Stadium: Santo Domingo; Attendance: 3,790; Referee: Luis Mario Milla Alvendiz (Spain) |

| 5 November 2017 13 | Oviedo | 3–2 | Lugo | Oviedo |
| 12:00 CET | Saúl Berjón 51' (pen.); Linares 54'; Aarón 71' | Report | Cristian Herrera 11'; Azeez 61' | Stadium: Carlos Tartiere; Attendance: 12,058; Referee: Gorka Sagués Oscoz (Spain) |

| 12 November 2017 14 | Gimnàstic | 1–2 | Oviedo | Tarragona |
| 16:00 CET | Barreiro 40' (pen.) | Report | Carlos Hernández 72'; Aarón 90+4' (pen.) | Stadium: Nou Estadi; Attendance: 5,927; Referee: Valentín Pizarro Gómez (Spain) |

| 18 November 2017 15 | Valladolid | 3–1 | Oviedo | Valladolid |
| 18:00 CET | Deivid 4'; Mata 77'; Míchel H. 90' | Report | Linares 87' | Stadium: José Zorrilla; Attendance: 11,716; Referee: Rubén Eiriz Mata (Spain) |

| 25 November 2017 16 | Oviedo | 3–1 | Numancia | Oviedo |
| 18:00 CET | Carlos Hernández 15'; Dani Calvo 57' (o.g.); Linares 67' | Report | Higinio Marín 32' | Stadium: Carlos Tartiere; Attendance: 11,844; Referee: Eduardo Prieto Iglesias (Spain) |

| 2 December 2017 17 | Lorca | 0–2 | Oviedo | Lorca |
| 20:00 CET | | Report | David Rocha 13'; Linares 26' | Stadium: Francisco Artés Carrasco; Attendance: 5,181; Referee: Isidro Díaz de Mera Escuderos (Spain) |

| 10 December 2017 18 | Oviedo | 1–0 | Osasuna | Oviedo |
| 18:00 CET | Johannesson 10' | Report | | Stadium: Carlos Tartiere; Attendance: 12,014; Referee: Iñaki Vicandi Garrido (Spain) |

| 17 December 2017 19 | Sevilla Atlético | 0–1 | Oviedo | Seville |
| 12:00 CET | | Report | David Rocha 37' | Stadium: Viejo Nervión; Attendance: 1,217; Referee: Jorge Valdés Aller (Spain) |

| 23 December 2017 20 | Oviedo | 3–0 | Cultural Leonesa | Oviedo |
| 18:00 CET | Aarón 11'; Carlos Hernández 55'; Guillermo Cotugno 88' | Report | | Stadium: Carlos Tartiere; Attendance: 18,089; Referee: Jorge Figueroa Vázquez (Spain) |

| 7 January 2018 21 | Huesca | 1–1 | Oviedo | Huesca |
| 18:00 CET | Álex Gallar 31' | Report | Aarón 70' | Stadium: El Alcoraz; Attendance: 4,282; Referee: Álvaro Moreno Aragón (Spain) |

| 12 January 2018 22 | Rayo Vallecano | 2–2 | Oviedo | Madrid |
| 21:00 CET | 'Chori' Domínguez 24'; Trejo 82' (pen.) | Report | Christian 40'; Carlos Hernández 49' | Stadium: Vallecas; Attendance: 8,855; Referee: David Pérez Pallas (Spain) |

| 20 January 2018 23 | Oviedo | 2–1 | Almería | Oviedo |
| 18:00 CET | Toché 61'; René 72' (o.g.) | Report | Fidel 53' | Stadium: Carlos Tartiere; Attendance: 14,829; Referee: Isidro Díaz de Mera Escuderos (Spain) |

| 27 January 2018 24 | Reus | 0–0 | Oviedo | Reus |
| 18:00 CET | | Report | | Stadium: Municipal; Attendance: 2,372; Referee: Eduardo Prieto Iglesias (Spain) |

| 4 February 2018 25 | Oviedo | 2–1 | Sporting Gijón | Oviedo |
| 18:00 CET | Mossa 31', 46' | Report | Jony 21' | Stadium: Carlos Tartiere; Attendance: 25,996; Referee: José Antonio López Toca (Spain) |

| 10 February 2018 26 | Cádiz | 2–1 | Oviedo | Cádiz |
| 18:00 CET | Alberto Perea 73'; Servando 80' | Report | Linares 55' | Stadium: Ramón de Carranza; Attendance: 14,579; Referee: Juan Luis Pulido Santana (Spain) |

| 17 February 2018 27 | Oviedo | 0–0 | Albacete | Oviedo |
| 18:00 CET | | Report | | Stadium: Carlos Tartiere; Attendance: 17,515; Referee: Jorge Valdés Aller (Spain) |

| 25 February 2018 28 | Zaragoza | 2–1 | Oviedo | Zaragoza |
| 16:00 CET | Borja Iglesias 69'; Forlín 73' (o.g.) | Report | Carlos Hernández 90' | Stadium: La Romareda; Attendance: 20,696; Referee: Iñaki Vicandi Garrido (Spain) |

| 2 March 2018 29 | Oviedo | 0–0 | Barcelona B | Oviedo |
| 21:00 CET | | Report | | Stadium: Carlos Tartiere; Attendance: 12,730; Referee: Luis Mario Milla Alvendiz (Spain) |

| 9 March 2018 30 | Tenerife | 3–1 | Oviedo | Santa Cruz de Tenerife |
| 21:00 CET, 20:00 WET | Longo 18'; Álex Mula 39', 72' | Report | Forlín 64' | Stadium: Heliodoro Rodríguez López; Attendance: 14,600; Referee: Rubén Eiriz Mata (Spain) |

| 18 March 2018 31 | Oviedo | 2–1 | Granada | Oviedo |
| 18:00 CET | Forlín 45'; Steven Prieto 63' | Report | Pierre Kunde 40' | Stadium: Carlos Tartiere; Attendance: 14,320; Referee: Dámaso Arcediano Monescillo (Spain) |

| 24 March 2018 32 | Córdoba | 1–1 | Oviedo | Córdoba |
| 18:00 CET | Aythami Artiles 87' | Report | Diego Fabbrini 26' | Stadium: El EArcángel; Attendance: 18,078; Referee: Aitor Gorostegui Fernández-Ortega (Spain) |

| 31 March 2018 33 | Oviedo | 0–1 | Alcorcón | Oviedo |
| 18:00 CEST | | Report | Jonathan Pereira 90+3' | Stadium: Carlos Tartiere; Attendance: 13,336; Referee: Guillermo Cuadra Fernández (Spain) |

| 8 April 2018 34 | Lugo | 0–1 | Oviedo | Lugo |
| 16:00 CEST | | Report | Johannesson 82' | Stadium: Anxo Carro; Attendance: 5,442; Referee: Álvaro Moreno Aragón (Spain) |

| 15 April 2018 35 | Oviedo | 1–0 | Gimnàstic | Oviedo |
| 20:00 CEST | Saúl Berjón 36' | Report | | Stadium: Carlos Tartiere; Attendance: 15,741; Referee: Eduardo Prieto Iglesias (Spain) |

| 20 April 2018 36 | Oviedo | 1–2 | Valladolid | Oviedo |
| 21:00 CEST | Linares 87' | Report | Mata 60'; Ramón Folch 62' (o.g.) | Stadium: Carlos Tartiere; Attendance: 17,103; Referee: Rubén Eiriz Mata (Spain) |

| 29 April 2018 37 | Numancia | 3–0 | Oviedo | Soria |
| 12:00 CEST | Guillermo 34'; Pablo Valcarce 37', 53' | Report | | Stadium: Los Pajaritos; Attendance: 5,002; Referee: David Pérez Pallas (Spain) |

| 6 May 2018 38 | Oviedo | 2–0 | Lorca FC | Oviedo |
| 12:00 CEST | Linares 35', 74' | Report | | Stadium: Carlos Tartiere; Attendance: 11,068; Referee: José Antonio López Toca (Spain) |

| 12 May 2018 39 | Osasuna | 2–1 | Oviedo | Pamplona |
| 20:30 CEST | Fran Mérida 59'; David 83' | Report | Linares 16' | Stadium: El Sadar; Attendance: 13,771; Referee: Dámaso Arcediano Monescillo (Spain) |

| 19 May 2018 40 | Oviedo | 2–1 | Sevilla Atlético | Oviedo |
| 16:00 CEST | Ramón Folch 4'; Christian 56' | Report | Ramón Folch 62' (o.g.) | Stadium: Carlos Tartiere; Attendance: 11,688; Referee: Daniel Ocón Arráiz (Spain) |

| 27 May 2018 41 | Cultural Leonesa | 2–0 | Oviedo | León |
| 20:30 CEST | Señé 45' (pen.); Rodri 90+5' | Report | | Stadium: Reino de León; Attendance: 12,354; Referee: Rubén Eiriz Mata (Spain) |

| 2 June 2018 42 | Oviedo | 2–1 | Huesca | Oviedo |
| 20:30 CEST | Johannesson 26'; Linares 72' | Report | Jair 81' | Stadium: Carlos Tartiere; Attendance: 10,459; Referee: Valentín Pizarro Gómez (Spain) |

=== Copa del Rey ===
==== Second round ====
Win Draw Loss Fixtures

| 6 September 2017 | Oviedo | 0–1 | Numancia | Oviedo |
| 20:00 CEST | | Report | Mateu 18' | Stadium: Carlos Tartiere; Attendance: 10,574; Referee: José Antonio López Toca (Spain) |

== Statistics ==
=== Squad statistics ===
| No. | Pos | Nat | Player | Total | | Segunda División | | Copa del Rey | |
| No. | Pos | Nat | Player | Apps | Goals | Apps | Goals | Apps | Goals |
|---|---|---|---|---|---|---|---|---|---|
| 1 | GK | (Spain) ESP | Alfonso Herrero | 28 | 0 | 27+0 | 0 | 1+0 | 0 |
| 2 | DF | (Iceland) ISL | Diego Johannesson | 32 | 4 | 25+7 | 4 | 0+0 | 0 |
| 3 | DF | (Spain) ESP | Francisco Varela | 8 | 0 | 2+6 | 0 | 0+0 | 0 |
| 4 | DF | (Spain) ESP | Héctor Verdés | 16 | 2 | 14+2 | 2 | 0+0 | 0 |
| 5 | DF | (Argentina) ARG | Juan Forlín | 34 | 2 | 32+1 | 2 | 0+1 | 0 |
| 6 | DF | (Spain) ESP | Carlos Hernández | 38 | 6 | 38+0 | 6 | 0+0 | 0 |
| 7 | MF | (Spain) ESP | Aarón Ñíguez | 35 | 5 | 31+4 | 5 | 0+0 | 0 |
| 8 | MF | (Spain) ESP | Ramón Folch | 42 | 1 | 41+0 | 1 | 1+0 | 0 |
| 9 | FW | (Spain) ESP | Toché | 33 | 6 | 20+13 | 6 | 0+0 | 0 |
| 10 | FW | (Spain) ESP | Miguel Linares | 37 | 10 | 23+13 | 10 | 1+0 | 0 |
| 11 | MF | (Slovenia) SVN | Matej Pučko | 6 | 0 | 2+3 | 0 | 1+0 | 0 |
| 13 | GK | (Spain) ESP | Juan Carlos | 15 | 0 | 15+0 | 0 | 0+0 | 0 |
| 14 | FW | (Ghana) GHA | Yaw Yeboah | 21 | 0 | 7+13 | 0 | 1+0 | 0 |
| 15 | MF | (Kenya) KEN | McDonald Mariga | 15 | 0 | 10+5 | 0 | 0+0 | 0 |
| 16 | FW | (Italy) ITA | Diego Fabbrini | 17 | 1 | 9+8 | 1 | 0+0 | 0 |
| 17 | MF | (Hungary) HUN | Patrik Hidi | 14 | 0 | 5+9 | 0 | 0+0 | 0 |
| 18 | DF | (Spain) ESP | Christian Fernández | 37 | 3 | 37+0 | 3 | 0+0 | 0 |
| 19 | DF | (Argentina) ARG | Nahuel Valentini | 8 | 0 | 5+2 | 0 | 1+0 | 0 |
| 20 | DF | (Uruguay) URU | Guillermo Cotugno | 30 | 1 | 21+8 | 1 | 1+0 | 0 |
| 21 | MF | (Spain) ESP | Saúl Berjón | 40 | 6 | 40+0 | 6 | 0+0 | 0 |
| 22 | MF | (Spain) ESP | David Rocha | 34 | 3 | 29+4 | 3 | 1+0 | 0 |
| 23 | MF | (Spain) ESP | Mossa | 39 | 2 | 29+9 | 2 | 1+0 | 0 |
| 24 | FW | (Colombia) COL | Olmes García | 1 | 0 | 0+0 | 0 | 1+0 | 0 |
| 27 | MF | (Spain) ESP | Viti Rozada | 7 | 0 | 0+7 | 0 | 0+0 | 0 |
| 28 | DF | (Spain) ESP | Álex Prendes | 1 | 0 | 0+0 | 0 | 1+0 | 0 |
| 29 | MF | (Spain) ESP | Asier Gomes | 1 | 0 | 0+0 | 0 | 1+0 | 0 |
| 31 | MF | (Spain) ESP | Lucas Ahijado | 1 | 0 | 0+0 | 0 | 0+1 | 0 |
| 32 | FW | (Spain) ESP | Steven Prieto | 3 | 1 | 0+2 | 1 | 0+1 | 0 |
Players who have left the club after the start of the season:
| 33 | FW | (Ghana) GHA | Owusu Kwabena | 8 | 0 | 0+8 | 0 | 0+0 | 0 |

- Last updated: 6 July 2018

=== Disciplinary record ===
| N | P | Nat. | Name | Segunda División | | | Copa del Rey | | | Total | | | Notes |
| N | P | Nat. | Name | Yellow card | Second yellow card | Red card | Yellow card | Second yellow card | Red card | Yellow card | Second yellow card | Red card | Notes |
| 1 | GK | (Spain) | Alfonso Herrero | 2 | | | | | | 2 | | | |
| 2 | DF | (Iceland) | Diego Johannesson | 8 | | | | | | 8 | | | |
| 3 | DF | (Spain) | Francisco Varela | 2 | | | | | | 2 | | | |
| 4 | DF | (Spain) | Héctor Verdés | 8 | | | | | | 8 | | | |
| 5 | DF | (Argentina) | Juan Forlín | 13 | | | 1 | | | 14 | | | |
| 6 | DF | (Spain) | Carlos Hernández | 10 | 1 | 1 | | | | 10 | 1 | 1 | |
| 7 | MF | (Spain) | Aarón Ñíguez | 7 | | | | | | 7 | | | |
| 8 | MF | (Spain) | Ramón Folch | 8 | | | | | | 8 | | | |
| 9 | FW | (Spain) | Toché | 9 | | | | | | 9 | | | |
| 10 | FW | (Spain) | Miguel Linares | 8 | | | | | | 8 | | | |
| 11 | MF | (Slovenia) | Matej Pučko | | | | | | | | | | |
| 13 | GK | (Spain) | Juan Carlos | 3 | | | | | | 3 | | | |
| 14 | FW | (Ghana) | Yaw Yeboah | 1 | | 1 | | | | 1 | | 1 | |
| 15 | MF | (Kenya) | McDonald Mariga | 6 | | | | | | 6 | | | |
| 16 | FW | (Italy) | Diego Fabbrini | 1 | | | | | | 1 | | | |
| 17 | MF | (Hungary) | Patrik Hidi | 3 | | | | | | 3 | | | |
| 18 | DF | (Spain) | Christian Fernández | 15 | | | | | | 15 | | | |
| 19 | DF | (Argentina) | Nahuel Valentini | 1 | | | 1 | | | 2 | | | |
| 20 | DF | (Uruguay) | Guillermo Cotugno | 2 | | | | | | 2 | | | |
| 21 | MF | (Spain) | Saúl Berjón | 5 | 1 | 1 | | | | 5 | 1 | 1 | |
| 22 | MF | (Spain) | David Rocha | 7 | | 1 | | | | 7 | | 1 | |
| 23 | MF | (Spain) | Mossa | 10 | | | | | | 10 | | | |
| 24 | FW | (Colombia) | Olmes García | | | | | | | | | | |
| 27 | MF | (Spain) | Viti Rozada | 1 | | | | | | 1 | | | |
| 28 | DF | (Spain) | Álex Prendes | | | | | | | | | | |
| 29 | MF | (Spain) | Asier Gomes | | | | | | | | | | |
| 31 | MF | (Spain) | Lucas Ahijado | | | | | | | | | | |
| 32 | FW | (Spain) | Steven Prieto | | | | | | | | | | |
Players who have left the club after the start of the season:
| 33 | FW | (Ghana) | Owusu Kwabena | 1 | | | | | | 1 | | | |

Last updated: 6 July 2018
Source: La Liga
Only competitive matches
(yellow card) = Number of bookings; (second yellow card) = Number of sending offs after a second yellow card; (red card) = Number of sending offs by a direct red card.
