= 2016–17 Real Oviedo season =

Real Oviedo
2016–17 season
- President: Jorge Menéndez
- Head coach: Fernando Hierro
- Stadium: Carlos Tartiere
- Segunda División: 8th
- Copa del Rey: Second round
- Top goalscorer: League: Toché (17); All: Toché (17)
- Highest home attendance: 18,946 (vs Cádiz)
- Lowest home attendance: 8,098 (vs Sevilla Atletico)
- Average home league attendance: 13,646
Home colours	Away colours	Third colours

The 2016–17 season is the 34th season in Segunda División played by Real Oviedo, a Spanish football club based in Oviedo, Asturias. It covers a period from 1 July 2016 to 30 June 2017.

== Players ==
=== Squad information ===
No.	Name	Nat.	Place of Birth	Date of birth (age)	Signed from	Since	Transfer Fee	End
Goalkeepers
1	Esteban	(Spain) (Asturias)	Avilés	27 June 1975 (age 51)	Almería	2014	Free	2017
13	Juan Carlos	(Spain) (Balearic Islands)	Calvià	27 July 1987 (age 39)	Albacete	2016	Free	2018
Defenders
2	Diego Johannesson	(Iceland) (Spain) (Asturias)	Villaviciosa	3 October 1993 (age 32)	Real Oviedo Vetusta	2011	Free	2017
3	Francisco Varela	(Spain) (Andalusia)	Atarfe	26 October 1994 (age 31)	Betis	2016	Free	2018
5	David Fernández	(Spain) (Community of Madrid)	Madrid	6 April 1985 (age 41)	Guadalajara	2012	Free	2017
14	Héctor Verdés	(Spain) (Valencian Community)	Villar del Arzobispo	24 June 1984 (age 42)	Alcorcón	2015	Free	2017
17	José Manuel Fernández	(Spain) (Andalusia)	Córdoba	18 November 1989 (age 36)	Zaragoza	2015	Free	2017
18	Christian Fernández	(Spain) (Cantabria)	Santander	15 October 1985 (age 40)	Las Palmas	2016	Free	2018
19	David Costas	(Spain) (Galicia (Spain))	Vigo	26 March 1995 (age 31)	Celta	2017	Loan	2017
24	Óscar Gil	(Spain) (Navarre)	Peralta	14 June 1995 (age 31)	Athletic Bilbao	2016	Loan	2017
Midfielders
4	Jonathan Vila	(Spain) (Galicia (Spain))	O Porriño	6 March 1986 (age 40)	Celta	2014	Free	2017
6	Jon Erice (c)	(Spain) (Navarre)	Pamplona	3 November 1986 (age 39)	Guadalajara	2013	Free	2017
7	Néstor Susaeta	(Spain) (Basque Country (autonomous community))	Eibar	11 November 1984 (age 41)	Guadalajara	2013	Free	2017
12	Héctor Nespral	(Spain) (Asturias)	Oviedo	8 February 1993 (age 33)	Real Oviedo Vetusta	2010	Free	2019
15	Lucas Torró	(Spain) (Valencian Community)	Cocentaina	19 July 1994 (age 32)	Real Madrid Castilla	2016	Loan	2017
16	Jorge Ortiz	(Spain) (Castilla–La Mancha)	Villacañas	25 April 1992 (age 34)	Fuenlabrada	2016	Free	2018
20	David Rocha	(Spain) (Extremadura)	Cáceres	7 February 1985 (age 41)	(United States) Houston Dynamo	2016	Free	2018
22	Nando García	(Spain) (Valencian Community)	Valencia	13 June 1994 (age 32)	Valencia Mestalla	2016	Loan	2017
23	Carlos de Pena	(Uruguay) (Italy)	(Uruguay) Montevideo	11 March 1992 (age 34)	(England) Middlesbrough	2017	Loan	2017
25	Borja Domínguez	(Spain) (Galicia (Spain))	Vigo	30 May 1992 (age 34)	Córdoba	2017	Loan	2017
Forwards
8	Michu	(Spain) (Asturias)	Oviedo	21 March 1986 (age 40)	Langreo	2016	Free	2017
9	Toché	(Spain) (Region of Murcia)	Santomera	1 January 1983 (age 43)	Deportivo La Coruña	2015	Free	2017
10	Miguel Linares	(Spain) (Aragon)	Zaragoza	30 September 1982 (age 43)	Recreativo	2014	Free	2017
11	Jonathan Pereira	(Spain) (Galicia (Spain))	Vigo	12 May 1982 (age 44)	Lugo	2016	Free	2017
21	Saúl Berjón	(Spain) (Asturias)	Oviedo	24 May 1986 (age 40)	(Mexico) UNAM	2017	Free	2019

== Transfers ==
=== In ===
No.	Pos.	Nat.	Name	Age	EU	Moving from	Type	Transfer window	Ends	Transfer fee	Source
17	DF	(Spain)	José Manuel Fernández	26	EU	Zaragoza	Transfer	Summer	2017	Free	
18	DF	(Spain)	Christian Fernández	30	EU	Las Palmas	Transfer	Summer	2018	Free	RealOviedo.es
13	GK	(Spain)	Juan Carlos	28	EU	Albacete	Transfer	Summer	2018	Free	RealOviedo.es
11	FW	(Spain)	Jonathan Pereira	29	EU	Lugo	Transfer	Summer	2017	Free	RealOviedo.es
20	MF	(Spain)	David Rocha	31	EU	(United States) Houston Dynamo	Transfer	Summer	2018	Free	RealOviedo.es
16	MF	(Spain)	Jorge Ortiz	24	EU	Fuenlabrada	Transfer	Summer	2018	Free	RealOviedo.es
3	DF	(Spain)	Francisco Varela	21	EU	Betis	Transfer	Summer	2018	Free	RealOviedo.es
15	MF	(Spain)	Lucas Torró	21	EU	Real Madrid Castilla	Loan	Summer	2017	Free	RealOviedo.es
26	GK	(Spain)	Alfonso Herrero	22	EU	Real Madrid Castilla	Transfer	Summer	2018	Free	RealOviedo.es
21	MF	(Uruguay)	Martín Alaniz	23	Non-EU	(Uruguay) River Plate	Loan	Summer	2017	Free	RealOviedo.es
22	MF	(Spain)	Nando García	22	EU	Valencia Mestalla	Loan	Summer	2017	Free	RealOviedo.es
24	DF	(Spain)	Óscar Gil	21	EU	Athletic Bilbao	Loan	Summer	2017	Free	RealOviedo.es
12	MF	(Spain)	Héctor Nespral	23	EU	Real Oviedo Vetusta	Promoted	Summer	2017	Free	RealOviedo.es
8	FW	(Spain)	Michu	30	EU	Langreo	Transfer	Summer	2017	Free	RealOviedo.es
21	FW	(Spain)	Saúl Berjón	30	EU	(Mexico) UNAM	Transfer	Winter	2019	Free	RealOviedo.es
19	DF	(Spain)	David Costas	21	EU	Celta	Loan	Winter	2017	Free	RealOviedo.es
23	MF	(Uruguay)	Carlos de Pena	24	EU	Middlesbrough	Loan	Winter	2017	Free	RealOviedo.es
25	MF	(Spain)	Borja Domínguez	24	EU	Córdoba	Loan	Winter	2017	Free	RealOviedo.es

=== Out ===
No.	Pos.	Nat.	Name	Age	EU	Moving to	Type	Transfer window	Transfer fee	Source
22	FW	(Ivory Coast)	Mamadou Koné	24	Non-EU	Racing Santander	Loan Return	Summer		
18	MF	(Spain)	Míchel	27	EU	(China) Guangzhou R&F	Loan return	Summer		
21	MF	(Spain)	Pablo Hervías	23	EU	Real Sociedad	Loan return	Summer		
12	MF	(Spain)	Diego Aguirre	25	EU	Rayo Vallecano	Loan return	Summer		
17	DF	(Spain)	José Manuel Fernández	26	EU	Zaragoza	Loan return	Summer		
11	MF	(Spain)	Borja Valle	23	EU	Deportivo La Coruña	Transfer	Summer	Free	CanalDeportivo.com
13	GK	(Spain)	Rubén Miño	27	EU	(Greece) AEK Larnaca	Transfer	Summer	Free	AEK.com.cy
29	MF	(Spain)	Cristian Rivera	18	EU	Eibar	Transfer	Summer	Free	SDEibar.com
24	DF	(Spain)	Nacho López	25	EU	Ponferradina	Transfer	Summer	Free	SDPonferradina.com
20	DF	(Spain)	Josete	28	EU	Elche	Transfer	Summer	Free	ElcheCF.es
15	MF	(Cameroon)	Franck Omgba	24	Non-EU	Hércules	Transfer	Summer	Free	HerculesDeAlicanteCF.net
9	FW	(Spain)	Diego Cervero	32	EU	Fuenlabrada	Transfer	Summer	Free	CFFuenlabrada.es
3	DF	(Spain)	Dani Bautista	35	EU		Retirement	Summer	Free	RealOviedo.es
18	DF	(Spain)	Borja Gómez	28	EU		Contract Termination	Summer		RealOviedo.es
19	DF	(Spain)	Carlos Peña	33	EU	Getafe	Transfer	Winter	Free	GetafeCF.com
21	MF	(Uruguay)	Martín Alaniz	23	Non-EU	(Uruguay) River Plate	Loan Return	Winter		RealOviedo.es
23	MF	(Spain)	Edu Bedia	27	EU	Zaragoza	Transfer	Winter	Free	RealZaragoza.com

== Technical staff ==
Position	Staff
Head coach	Fernando Hierro
Assistant coach	Julian Calero
Physical trainer	Roberto Ovejero
Goalkeeping coach	Sergio Segura
Doctor	Manolo Rodríguez
Physiotherapist	Gabriel Díaz
Material manager	Silvino Aparicio
Team delegate	Dani Bautista

Last updated: 4 September 2016
Source: List of Technical staff

== Pre-season and friendlies ==
Win Draw Loss Fixtures

16 July 2016 Friendly	Oviedo	6–1	Real Oviedo Vetusta	Oviedo
11:00 CEST	Linares 20', 35'; Toché 32'; Pereira 44'; own goal 50' (o.g.); Viti 79'	Report	David 41'	Stadium: El Requexón; Attendance: 500; Referee: Roberto Álvarez (Spain)

23 July 2016 Friendly	Lealtad	2–1	Oviedo	Villaviciosa
19:00 CEST	Juan Sáez 4'; Pablo Gallego 24' (pen.)	Report	Rocha 9'	Stadium: Les Caleyes; Attendance: 1,472; Referee: Alonso Prendes (Spain)

27 July 2016 Friendly	Selección AFE	0–0	Oviedo	Avilés
20:00 CEST		Report		Stadium: Suárez Puerta; Attendance: 1,000; Referee: Jonathan Morís (Spain)

30 July 2016 Emma Cuervo Trophy	Oviedo	0–2	Deportivo La Coruña	Ribadeo
19:00 CEST		Report	Borja Valle 55'; Fernando Navarro 80'	Stadium: Pape Barreiro; Attendance: 2,000; Referee: Pablo Brea (Spain)

6 August 2016 Friendly	Cultural Leonesa	1–5	Oviedo	León
19:00 CEST	Mario Ortiz 20'	Report	Susaeta 15'; Pereira 18'; Toché 22'; Nando 32'; Linares 62'	Stadium: Reino de León; Attendance: 3,000; Referee: César Rodríguez (Spain)

10 August 2016 Ramón Losada Trophy	Oviedo	1–0	Valladolid	Luarca
19:00 CEST	Linares 83'	Report		Stadium: La Veigona; Attendance: 1,000; Referee: Pablo Fernández (Spain)

14 August 2016 Friendly	Ponferradina	0–1	Oviedo	Ponferrada
20:00 CEST		Report	Nando 66'	Stadium: El Toralín; Referee: Valdés Varela (Spain)

== Competitions ==
=== Segunda División ===
Pos	Team	Pld	W	D	L	GF	GA	GD	Pts	Promotion, qualification or relegation
6	Huesca	42	16	15	11	53	43	+10	63 (Note: Huesca finished ahead of Valladolid on head-to-head points: Valladolid 1–2 Huesca, Huesca 1–0 Valladolid)	Qualification to promotion play-offs
7	Valladolid	42	18	9	15	52	47	+5	63	
8	Oviedo	42	17	10	15	47	47	0	61	
9	Lugo	42	14	13	15	49	52	−3	55 (Note: Lugo and Córdoba finished ahead of Reus on head-to-head points: Lugo 7 pts, Córdoba 7 pts, Reus 3 pts. Lugo finished ahead of Córdoba on head-to-head points: Córdoba 3–3 Lugo, Lugo 1–0 Córdoba)	
10	Córdoba	42	14	13	15	42	52	−10	55	

Source: La Liga
Rules for classification: 1) points; 2) head-to-head points; 3) head-to-head goal difference; 4) goal difference; 5) number of goals scored

==== Results summary ====
Overall								Home						Away					
Pld	W	D	L	GF	GA	GD	Pts	W	D	L	GF	GA	GD	W	D	L	GF	GA	GD
42	17	10	15	47	47	0	61	13	5	3	28	12	+16	4	5	12	19	35	−16

Last updated: 11 June 2017.
Source: LaLiga.es

==== Result round by round ====
Round	1	2	3	4	5	6	7	8	9	10	11	12	13	14	15	16	17	18	19	20	21	22	23	24	25	26	27	28	29	30	31	32	33	34	35	36	37	38	39	40	41	42
Ground	A	H	A	H	A	H	A	H	H	A	H	A	H	A	H	A	H	A	H	A	H	H	A	H	A	H	A	H	A	A	H	A	H	A	H	A	H	A	H	A	H	A
Result	L	W	D	D	L	L	W	D	W	D	W	W	D	L	W	L	W	L	L	L	W	W	L	W	W	W	D	W	D	L	W	L	W	L	D	L	L	D	D	L	W	W
Position	20	7	10	12	18	18	11	13	7	10	6	4	2	7	4	6	5	9	12	13	10	6	10	7	6	5	6	4	5	5	5	5	4	6	6	7	8	8	8	8	8	8

Updated to match(es) played on 11 June 2017. Source: LaLiga.es
A = Away; H = Home; W = Win; D = Draw; L = Loss

==== Matches ====
Win Draw Loss Fixtures

21 August 2016 1	Valladolid	1–0	Oviedo	Valladolid
22:30 CEST	Arnaiz 17'	Report		Stadium: José Zorrilla; Attendance: 7,996; Referee: Pedro Jesús Pérez Montero (Spain)

27 August 2016 2	Oviedo	2–0	Almería	Oviedo
19:00 CEST	Nando 54'; Toché 86'	Report		Stadium: Carlos Tartiere; Attendance: 11,916; Referee: Adrián Cordero Vega (Spain)

4 September 2016 3	Mallorca	0–0	Oviedo	Palma
20:00 CEST		Report		Stadium: Iberostar; Attendance: 9,471; Referee: Eduardo Prieto Iglesias (Spain)

11 September 2016 4	Oviedo	0–0	Mirandés	Oviedo
16:00 CEST		Report		Stadium: Carlos Tartiere; Attendance: 12,646; Referee: Valentín Pizarro Gómez (Spain)

18 September 2016 5	Getafe	2–1	Oviedo	Getafe
18:00 CEST	Paul Anton 50'; Jorge Molina 84'	Report	Lucas Torró 10'	Stadium: Coliseum Alfonso Pérez; Attendance: 6,533; Referee: Rubén Eiriz Mata (Spain)

22 September 2016 6	Oviedo	0–1	Reus Deportiu	Oviedo
20:00 CEST		Report	Máyor 90+5'	Stadium: Carlos Tartiere; Attendance: 11,389; Referee: Óliver de la Fuente Ramos (Spain)

25 September 2016 7	Cádiz	0–2	Oviedo	Cádiz
12:00 CEST		Report	Toché 15'; Linares 21'	Stadium: Ramón de Carranza; Attendance: 16,143; Referee: Juan Luis Pulido Santana (Spain)

2 October 2016 8	Oviedo	2–2	Numancia	Oviedo
18:00 CEST	Toché 20'; Alexander Callens 68' (o.g.)	Report	Regalón 12'; Manu del Moral 63'	Stadium: Carlos Tartiere; Attendance: 13,801; Referee: Juan Manuel López Amaya (Spain)

9 October 2016 9	Oviedo	2–0	Rayo Vallecano	Oviedo
12:00 CEST	Linares 35'; Toché 72' (pen.)	Report		Stadium: Carlos Tartiere; Attendance: 14,124; Referee: Jorge Valdés Aller (Spain)

15 October 2016 10	Girona	0–0	Oviedo	Girona
18:00 CEST		Report		Stadium: Montilivi; Attendance: 4,608; Referee: David Pérez Pallas (Spain)

23 October 2016 11	Oviedo	2–0	Tenerife	Oviedo
20:00 CEST	Linares 31', 87'	Report		Stadium: Carlos Tartiere; Attendance: 13,161; Referee: Javier Alberola Rojas (Spain)

30 October 2016 12	UCAM Murcia	0–1	Oviedo	Murcia
18:00 CET		Report	Héctor Verdés 34'	Stadium: La Condomina; Attendance: 4,413; Referee: Dámaso Arcediano Monescillo (Spain)

6 November 2016 13	Oviedo	1–1	Lugo	Oviedo
18:00 CET	Héctor Verdés 88'	Report	Fernando Seoane 12'	Stadium: Carlos Tartiere; Attendance: 13,022; Referee: Eduardo Prieto Iglesias (Spain)

12 November 2016 14	Huesca	4–0	Oviedo	Huesca
16:00 CET	David Ferreiro 32', 84'; Melero 39'; Borja Lázaro 45+1'	Report		Stadium: El Alcoraz; Attendance: 3,057; Referee: Jorge Figueroa Vázquez (Spain)

19 November 2016 15	Oviedo	2–0	Levante	Oviedo
18:00 CET	Michu 60'; Jonathan Pereira 73'	Report		Stadium: Carlos Tartiere; Attendance: 13,996; Referee: Francisco Manuel Arias López (Spain)

26 November 2016 16	Alcorcón	5–1	Oviedo	Alcorcón
18:00 CET	David Navarro 16'; Toribio 41'; David Rodríguez 58', 69'; Óscar Plano 82'	Report	Jonathan Pereira 70'	Stadium: Santo Domingo; Attendance: 2,702; Referee: Javier Alberola Rojas (Spain)

4 December 2016 17	Oviedo	1–0	Gimnàstic	Oviedo
16:00 CET		Report	Toché 19'	Stadium: Carlos Tartiere; Attendance: 13,615; Referee: Dámaso Arcediano Monescillo (Spain)

11 December 2016 18	Zaragoza	2–1	Oviedo	Zaragoza
20:00 CET	Ángel 18', 51' (pen.)	Report	Francisco Varela 86'	Stadium: La Romareda; Attendance: 13,350; Referee: Eduardo Prieto Iglesias (Spain)

17 December 2016 19	Oviedo	1–2	Córdoba	Oviedo
18:00 CET	Linares 89'	Report	Javi Galán 21'; Borja Domínguez 47'	Stadium: Carlos Tartiere; Attendance: 11,799; Referee: Aitor Gorostegui Fernández-Ortega (Spain)

8 January 2017 20	Sevilla Atlético	5–3	Oviedo	Seville
20:00 CET	Ivi 11' (pen.); Héctor Verdés 29' (o.g.); Fede San Emeterio 38'; David Carmona 78'; Alejandro Pozo 83'	Report	Toché 76' (pen.), 85'; Linares 88'	Stadium: Ramón Sánchez Pizjuán; Attendance: 2,776; Referee: Valentín Pizarro Gómez (Spain)

14 January 2017 21	Oviedo	2–1	Elche	Oviedo
18:00 CET	Toché 49'; Susaeta 60'	Report	Nino 76'	Stadium: Carlos Tartiere; Attendance: 11,975; Referee: David Pérez Pallas (Spain)

21 January 2017 22	Oviedo	1–0	Valladolid	Oviedo
16:00 CET	Toché 15'	Report		Stadium: Carlos Tartiere; Attendance: 13,681; Referee: Rubén Eiriz Mata (Spain)

29 January 2017 23	Almería	3–0	Oviedo	Almería
18:00 CET	Borja F.F. 48'; Quique 80'; Gaspar 86'	Report		Stadium: Juegos Mediterráneos; Attendance: 7,014; Referee: David Medié Jiménez (Spain)

5 February 2017 24	Oviedo	2–1	Mallorca	Oviedo
12:00 CET	Toché 8'; Costas 71'	Report	Raíllo 40'	Stadium: Carlos Tartiere; Attendance: 11,933; Referee: Juan Luis Pulido Santana (Spain)

12 February 2017 25	Mirandés	0–2	Oviedo	Miranda de Ebro
18:00 CET	Saúl Berjón 21'; Costas 63'	Report		Stadium: Anduva; Attendance: 4,129; Referee: Gorka Sagués Oscoz (Spain)

19 February 2017 26	Oviedo	2–1	Getafe	Oviedo
18:00 CET	Toché 17'; Jon Erice 89'	Report	Chuli 47'	Stadium: Carlos Tartiere; Attendance: 17,283; Referee: Pedro Jesús Pérez Montero (Spain)

24 February 2017 27	Reus Deportiu	1–1	Oviedo	Reus
20:00 CET	Ramón Folch 28'	Report	Borja Domínguez 67'	Stadium: Municipal; Attendance: 4,099; Referee: Dámaso Arcediano Monescillo (Spain)

4 March 2017 28	Oviedo	2–1	Cádiz	Oviedo
20:00 CET	Linares 43'; Christian 51'	Report	Salvi 22'	Stadium: Carlos Tartiere; Attendance: 18,946; Referee: Isidro Díaz de Mera Escuderos (Spain)

11 March 2017 29	Numancia	0–0	Oviedo	Soria
18:00 CET		Report		Stadium: Los Pajaritos; Attendance: 3,770; Referee: Juan Manuel López Amaya (Spain)

19 March 2017 30	Rayo Vallecano	2–0	Oviedo	Madrid
20:30 CET	Ebert 13' (pen.); Javi Guerra 59'	Report		Stadium: Vallecas; Attendance: 8,151; Referee: Óliver de la Fuente Ramos (Spain)

25 March 2017 31	Oviedo	2–0	Girona	Oviedo
20:45 CET	Toché 46', 54'	Report		Stadium: Carlos Tartiere; Attendance: 16,048; Referee: Javier Alberola Rojas (Spain)

2 April 2017 32	Tenerife	1–0	Oviedo	Santa Cruz de Tenerife
17:00 WEST, 18:00 CEST	Aitor Sanz 17' (pen.)	Report		Stadium: Heliodoro Rodríguez López; Attendance: 17,353; Referee: David Pérez Pallas (Spain)

9 April 2017 33	Oviedo	2–0	UCAM Murcia	Oviedo
18:00 CEST	Toché 3'; Borja Domínguez 90+3'	Report		Stadium: Carlos Tartiere; Attendance: 14,795; Referee: Saúl Ais Reig (Spain)

16 April 2017 34	Lugo	2–1	Oviedo	Lugo
18:00 CEST	Joselu 41', 60'	Report	Toché 7'	Stadium: Anxo Carro; Attendance: 5,987; Referee: Aitor Gorostegui Fernández-Ortega (Spain)

21 April 2017 35	Oviedo	1–1	Huesca	Oviedo
20:00 CEST	Costas 29'	Report	Carlos David 68'	Stadium: Carlos Tartiere; Attendance: 15,727; Referee: Juan Manuel López Amaya (Spain)

29 April 2017 36	Levante	1–0	Oviedo	Valencia
18:00 CEST	Postigo 55'	Report		Stadium: Ciutat de València; Attendance: 18,381; Referee: Adrián Cordero Vega (Spain)

5 May 2017 37	Oviedo	0–1	Alcorcón	Oviedo
20:00 CEST		Report	Álvaro 69'	Stadium: Carlos Tartiere; Attendance: 14,731; Referee: Juan Luis Pulido Santana (Spain)

13 May 2017 38	Gimnàstic	2–2	Oviedo	Tarragona
20:45 CEST	Tejera 59', 81'	Report	Carlos de Pena 17'; Toché 24'	Stadium: Nou Estadi; Attendance: 5,413; Referee: Pedro Jesús Pérez Montero (Spain)

20 May 2017 39	Oviedo	0–0	Zaragoza	Oviedo
21:00 CEST		Report		Stadium: Carlos Tartiere; Attendance: 15,285; Referee: Jorge Figueroa Vazquez (Spain)

28 May 2017 40	Córdoba	4–2	Oviedo	Córdoba
20:30 CEST	Piovaccari 1', 11'; Alfaro 35'; Javi Lara 52'	Report	Saúl Berjón 69'; Linares 90+4' (pen.)	Stadium: Nuevo Arcángel; Attendance: 14,820; Referee: Dámaso Arcediano Monescillo (Spain)

4 June 2017 41	Oviedo	1–0	Sevilla Atlético	Oviedo
20:00 CEST	Christian Fernández 37'	Report		Stadium: Carlos Tartiere; Attendance: 8,098; Referee: Rubén Eiriz Mata (Spain)

10 June 2017 42	Elche	0–2	Oviedo	Elche
20:30 CEST		Report	Toché 65'; Nando 74'	Stadium: Martínez Valero; Attendance: 2,520; Referee: Pedro Jesús Pérez Montero (Spain)

=== Copa del Rey ===
==== Second round ====
Win Draw Loss Fixtures

8 September 2016	UCAM Murcia	4–3 (a.e.t.)	Oviedo	Murcia
20:00 CEST	Nono 26'; Juande 33'; Tito 63', 110'	Report	Linares 23'; Michu 82', 90+3'	Stadium: La Condomina; Attendance: 2,964; Referee: Guillermo Cuadra Fernández (Spain)

== Statistics ==
=== Squad statistics ===
No.	Pos	Nat	Player	Total		Segunda División		Copa del Rey	
No.	Pos	Nat	Player	Apps	Goals	Apps	Goals	Apps	Goals
1	GK	(Spain) ESP	Esteban	1	0	0+0	0	1+0	0
2	DF	(Iceland) ISL	Diego Johannesson	18	0	16+1	0	1+0	0
3	DF	(Spain) ESP	Francisco Varela	16	1	11+5	1	0+0	0
4	MF	(Spain) ESP	Jonathan Vila	8	0	2+5	0	1+0	0
5	DF	(Spain) ESP	David Fernández	38	0	33+5	0	0+0	0
6	MF	(Spain) ESP	Jon Erice	36	1	30+6	1	0+0	0
7	MF	(Spain) ESP	Néstor Susaeta	40	1	35+4	1	0+1	0
8	FW	(Spain) ESP	Michu	28	3	12+15	1	1+0	2
9	FW	(Spain) ESP	Toché	41	17	38+2	17	0+1	0
10	FW	(Spain) ESP	Miguel Linares	36	9	26+9	8	1+0	1
11	FW	(Spain) ESP	Jonathan Pereira	15	2	5+9	2	1+0	0
12	MF	(Spain) ESP	Héctor Nespral	1	0	0+1	0	0+0	0
13	GK	(Spain) ESP	Juan Carlos	42	0	42+0	0	0+0	0
14	DF	(Spain) ESP	Héctor Verdés	23	2	23+0	2	0+0	0
15	MF	(Spain) ESP	Lucas Torró	40	1	38+1	1	0+1	0
16	MF	(Spain) ESP	Jorge Ortiz	4	0	1+3	0	0+0	0
17	DF	(Spain) ESP	José Manuel Fernández	28	0	27+1	0	0+0	0
18	DF	(Spain) ESP	Christian Fernández	32	2	30+1	2	1+0	0
19	DF	(Spain) ESP	David Costas	19	3	19+0	3	0+0	0
20	MF	(Spain) ESP	David Rocha	30	0	20+10	0	0+0	0
21	FW	(Spain) ESP	Saúl Berjón	22	2	17+5	2	0+0	0
22	MF	(Spain) ESP	Nando García	32	2	13+19	2	0+0	0
23	MF	(Uruguay) URU	Carlos de Pena	7	1	3+4	1	0+0	0
24	DF	(Spain) ESP	Óscar Gil	15	0	9+5	0	1+0	0
25	MF	(Spain) ESP	Borja Domínguez	10	2	7+3	2	0+0	0
Players who have left the club after the start of the season:
19	DF	(Spain) ESP	Carlos Peña	5	0	2+2	0	1+0	0
21	MF	(Uruguay) URU	Martín Alaniz	6	0	1+4	0	1+0	0
23	MF	(Spain) ESP	Edu Bedia	8	0	2+5	0	1+0	0

- Last updated: 12 June 2017
- Source: La Liga

=== Disciplinary record ===
N	P	Nat.	Name	Segunda División			Copa del Rey			Total			Notes
N	P	Nat.	Name	Yellow card	Second yellow card	Red card	Yellow card	Second yellow card	Red card	Yellow card	Second yellow card	Red card	Notes
1	GK	(Spain)	Esteban										
2	DF	(Iceland)	Diego Johannesson	3						3			
3	DF	(Spain)	Francisco Varela	3						3			
4	MF	(Spain)	Jonathan Vila				1			1			
5	DF	(Spain)	David Fernández	3						3			
6	MF	(Spain)	Jon Erice	9		1				9		1	
7	MF	(Spain)	Néstor Susaeta	6						6			
8	FW	(Spain)	Michu	1	2					1	2		
9	FW	(Spain)	Toché	8						8			
10	FW	(Spain)	Miguel Linares	8						8			
11	FW	(Spain)	Jonathan Pereira	2						2			
12	MF	(Spain)	Héctor Nespral										
13	GK	(Spain)	Juan Carlos	3						3			
14	DF	(Spain)	Héctor Verdés	13		1				13		1	
15	MF	(Spain)	Lucas Torró	9						9			
16	MF	(Spain)	Jorge Ortiz										
17	DF	(Spain)	José Manuel Fernández	6						6			
18	DF	(Spain)	Christian Fernández	8		1				8		1	
19	DF	(Spain)	David Costas	3						3			
20	MF	(Spain)	David Rocha	4						4			
21	FW	(Spain)	Saúl Berjón	1	4		1			2	4		
22	MF	(Spain)	Nando García	5						5			
23	MF	(Uruguay)	Carlos de Pena	3						3			
24	DF	(Spain)	Óscar Gil	5	1	1				5	1	1	
25	MF	(Spain)	Borja Domínguez	2						2			
Players who have left the club after the start of the season:
19	DF	(Spain)	Carlos Peña										
21	MF	(Uruguay)	Martín Alaniz				1			1			
23	MF	(Spain)	Edu Bedia	3			1			4			

Last updated: 12 June 2017
Source: La Liga
Only competitive matches
(yellow card) = Number of bookings; (second yellow card) = Number of sending offs after a second yellow card; (red card) = Number of sending offs by a direct red card.

== See also ==
- 2016–17 Segunda División
- 2016–17 Copa del Rey
