= Miguel Linares =

Spanish footballer

Personal information
- Full name: Miguel Linares Cólera
- Date of birth: 30 September 1982 (age 44)
- Place of birth: Zaragoza, Spain
- Height: 1.81 m (5 ft 11 1/2 in)
- Position: Striker

Youth career
- Fuentes

Senior career*
Years	Team	Apps	(Gls)
2002–2004	Utebo	36	(30)
2004–2005	Zaragoza B	27	(2)
2005	Huesca	14	(0)
2006–2008	Barbastro	73	(46)
2008–2009	Alcoyano	31	(15)
2009–2010	Salamanca	39	(10)
2010–2013	Elche	48	(12)
2013–2014	Recreativo	38	(10)
2014–2018	Oviedo	131	(52)
2018–2019	Reus	18	(4)
2019–2020	Zaragoza	35	(7)
2020–2022	Ejea	0	(0)
Total		490	(188)
- * Club domestic league appearances and goals

Miguel Linares Cólera (born 30 September 1982) is a Spanish former professional footballer who played as a striker.

== Club career ==
Born in Zaragoza, Aragon, Linares began his career at Utebo FC of Tercera División. He spent the 2004–05 season with Deportivo Aragón in the Segunda División B and had a brief spell at SD Huesca before joining UD Barbastro in 2006, who were relegated from the third tier in his first campaign.

In summer 2008, following a 34-goal haul, Linares moved outside his native region for the first time, joining CD Alcoyano. He contributed 15 goals from 35 matches in his only season as the Valencians won their group, eventually falling short in the promotion play-offs to Segunda División.

Linares signed a two-year deal with UD Salamanca on 22 June 2009. After one season at the Estadio Helmántico – making his professional debut on 30 August in a 1–0 away win against Cádiz CF at the age of 26 years and 11 months– he transferred to fellow league team Elche CF. The latter won the championship and promotion to La Liga in 2013, though he made only eight appearances and scored once; during his tenure, he suffered two consecutive anterior cruciate ligament injuries to his right knee.

Following this, Linares remained in the second tier with Recreativo de Huelva, and in 2014 the 32-year-old moved to Real Oviedo one league down. He was top scorer with 30 goals (31 across all competitions) in 39 games as the Asturians won the title in 2014–15, including two in a 3–0 win over Gimnàstic de Tarragona in the second leg of the play-off final on 10 June 2015. The previous October/November, he had scored hat-tricks in consecutive home defeats of Celta de Vigo B, CD Lealtad and Real Murcia CF.

On 17 June 2018, Linares joined CF Reus Deportiu in the second division after agreeing to a one-year contract. Halfway through the season, however, he left the club after it was expelled from the Liga de Fútbol Profesional due to unpaid wages, joining Real Zaragoza shortly after.

Linares retired in January 2022 at the age of 39, after two years at lower-league side SD Ejea where he failed to play a single competitive game due to another serious knee injury.

== Career statistics ==
Appearances and goals by club, season and competition
Club	Season	League			National Cup		Other		Total	
Club	Season	Division	Apps	Goals	Apps	Goals	Apps	Goals	Apps	Goals
Zaragoza B	2004–05	Segunda División B	27	2	—		1 (Note: Appearances in promotion playoffs)	0	28	2
Huesca	2005–06	Segunda División B	14	0	0	0	—		14	0
Barbastro	2006–07	Segunda División B	35	10	2	0	—		37	10
Barbastro	2007–08	Tercera División	?	?	—		—		?	?
Barbastro	Total		?	?	2	0	0	0	?	?
Alcoyano	2008–09	Segunda División B	31	15	0	0	4	0	35	15
Salamanca	2009–10	Segunda División	39	10	2	0	—		41	10
Elche	2010–11	Segunda División	24	8	2	1	—		26	9
Elche	2011–12	Segunda División	16	3	1	0	—		17	3
Elche	2012–13	Segunda División	8	1	0	0	—		8	1
Elche	Total		48	12	3	1	0	0	51	13
Recreativo	2031–14	Segunda División	38	10	1	2	—		39	12
Oviedo	2014–15	Segunda División B	36	28	1	1	3	2	40	31
Oviedo	2015–16	Segunda División	24	6	1	0	—		25	6
Oviedo	2016–17	Segunda División	35	8	1	1	—		36	9
Oviedo	2017–18	Segunda División	36	10	1	0	—		37	10
Oviedo	Total		131	52	4	2	3	2	138	56
Reus	2018–19	Segunda División	18	4	2	1	—		20	5
Zaragoza	2018–19	Segunda División	13	2	0	0	—		13	2
Zaragoza	2019–20	Segunda División	22	5	4	1	2	0	28	6
Zaragoza	Total		35	7	4	1	2	0	41	8
Ejea	2020–21	Segunda División B	0	0	0	0	—		0	0
Career total			416	122	18	7	10	2	444	131

== Honours ==
Elche

- Segunda División: 2012–13

Oviedo

- Segunda División B: 2014–15
