= Aarón Ñíguez =

Spanish footballer

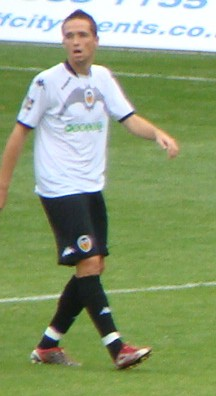
- Ñíguez with Valencia in 2009

Personal information
- Full name: Aarón Ñíguez Esclápez
- Date of birth: 26 April 1989 (age 37)
- Place of birth: Elche, Spain
- Height: 1.70 m (5 ft 7 in)
- Position: Winger

Youth career
- Caja de Elche
- 2000–2006: Valencia

Senior career*
Years	Team	Apps	(Gls)
2006–2007	Valencia B	29	(4)
2006–2011	Valencia	0	(0)
2007	→ Xerez (loan)	8	(0)
2008	→ Iraklis (loan)	12	(3)
2008–2009	→ Rangers (loan)	3	(0)
2009–2010	→ Celta (loan)	11	(0)
2010–2011	→ Recreativo (loan)	28	(5)
2011–2013	Almería	47	(4)
2013–2015	Elche	59	(1)
2015–2016	Braga	12	(0)
2016–2017	Tenerife	36	(4)
2017–2018	Oviedo	44	(5)
2018–2019	Johor Darul Ta'zim	3	(0)
2020	Málaga	0	(0)
2021	La Nucía	0	(0)
2021–2022	Eldense	17	(2)
2022–2026	Costa City	61	(13)
Total		370	(41)

International career
2004–2005	Spain U16	4	(3)
2005–2006	Spain U17	10	(6)
2006–2008	Spain U19	23	(8)
2009	Spain U20	11	(7)
2008–2009	Spain U21	4	(1)
- * Club domestic league appearances and goals as of 13:43, 4 October 2026 (UTC)

Aarón Ñíguez Esclápez (born 26 April 1989) is a Spanish professional footballer who plays as a winger.

A Valencia youth graduate, he was capped by Spain at various youth levels, and competed mainly in the Segunda División during his career, also having brief abroad spells in Greece, Scotland, Portugal and Malaysia.

== Club career ==
=== Valencia ===
Born in Elche, Alicante, Valencian Community, Ñíguez was a product of Valencia CF's youth system. He made his first-team debut on 25 October 2006 aged 17, as a second-half substitute in a 2–1 away win over Racing Club Portuense in the round of 32 of the Copa del Rey, and was also featured in the second leg. On 5 December, against AS Roma in the group stage of the UEFA Champions League, he started and played 27 minutes of the 1–0 away loss; he spent the vast majority of his first senior year with the reserves in the Segunda División B, featuring regularly but suffering relegation.

=== Loans ===
Having started the 2007–08 season on loan with Segunda División side Xerez CD, Ñíguez switched in the January transfer window to Iraklis F.C. from Greece. He scored his first goal on 16 March 2008, through a penalty kick in a 1–0 win over Panionios F.C. after his bicycle kick was blocked by an opponent's hand.

Ñíguez signed a two-year loan contract with Scottish Premier League club Rangers on 13 August 2008, with an option to buy. He made his official debut in the 7–1 defeat of Hamilton Academical on 6 December, coming off the bench and immediately creating a goal for compatriot Nacho Novo. He scored his first competitive goal for his new team in a Scottish Cup tie against Third Division's Forfar Athletic, and was booked for removing his shirt in celebration. His second also came in the domestic cup, against Hamilton from the penalty spot, in what was his first start.

On 7 June 2009, it was announced that Ñíguez's loan would be terminated. On 30 August, he joined RC Celta de Vigo, playing less than one third of the matches during the campaign due to a serious anterior cruciate ligament injury. For 2010–11, also on loan, he moved to another side in the second tier, Recreativo de Huelva.

=== Almería and Elche ===
In July 2011, Ñíguez cut ties with Valencia and agreed to a five-year deal with another club in the division, UD Almería. On 7 January 2013, shortly after being released by the Andalusians, he joined Elche CF in the same league until June 2017. He appeared in 16 games for the latter, who were promoted to La Liga for the first time since 1989.

Ñíguez made his debut in the Spanish top flight on 19 August 2013, starting and being booked in the 3–0 away loss against Rayo Vallecano. On 31 October, he scored his only goal in the competition, in a 2–2 draw at Athletic Bilbao.

On 12 August 2015, Ñíguez left Elche.

=== Braga ===
Ñíguez moved to a third foreign league in late August 2015, signing for S.C. Braga of the Portuguese Primeira Liga. He made 15 appearances in all competitions during his spell.

=== Tenerife and Oviedo ===
On 30 August 2016, Ñíguez joined CD Tenerife on a one-year contract, thus returning to Spain. The following 3 July, he signed to a two-year deal with fellow second-tier Real Oviedo.

A regular starter with the latter, Ñíguez lost his starting spot after the arrival of Yoel Bárcenas, and severed his ties on 18 November 2018.

=== Johor Darul Ta'zim ===
On 19 November 2018, Ñíguez joined Johor Darul Ta'zim F.C. on a five-year contract. In February 2019, however, he was released and replaced by Leandro Velázquez.

=== Málaga and Elche return ===
Ñíguez went back to the Spanish second division on 4 March 2020, signing with Málaga CF until 30 June. On 1 September, after Elche achieved promotion to the top flight, he rejoined the club after activating a clause in his previous contract.

== International career ==
Ñíguez played in the 2006 UEFA European Championship for the Spain under-17 team, finishing as fourth top scorer in the tournament with three goals. He was also a key member of the under-19 side that won the following year's European Championship, beating Greece in the final.

On 18 November 2008, Ñíguez made his debut for the under-21s, in a 4–1 friendly loss to Portugal.

== Personal life ==
Ñíguez came from a football family: his father, José Antonio, played several years with Elche – including the 1984–85 season in La Liga – as a striker.

His older brother Jonathan (another midfielder) was also developed at Valencia, spending the vast majority of his senior career in the lower leagues. The youngest, Saúl, was brought up at Atlético Madrid.

== Career statistics ==
As of match played 6 January 2021

Appearances and goals by club, season and competition
Club	Season	League			National cup		League cup		Continental		Other		Total	
Club	Season	Division	Apps	Goals	Apps	Goals	Apps	Goals	Apps	Goals	Apps	Goals	Apps	Goals
Valencia B	2006–07	Segunda División B	29	4	—		—		—		1 (Note: Appearance in Segunda División B play-offs)	0	30	4
Valencia	2006–07	La Liga	0	0	2	0	—		1 (Note: Appearance in UEFA Champions League)	0	—		3	0
Xerez (loan)	2007–08	Segunda División	8	0	3	0	—		—		—		11	0
Iraklis (loan)	2007–08	Super League Greece	12	3	0	0	—		—		—		12	3
Rangers (loan)	2008–09	Premier League	3	0	2	2	—		—		—		5	2
Celta (loan)	2009–10	Segunda División	11	0	2	0	—		—		—		13	0
Recreativo (loan)	2010–11	Segunda División	28	5	0	0	—		—		—		28	5
Almería	2011–12	Segunda División	30	3	3	0	—		—		—		33	3
Almería	2012–13	Segunda División	17	1	3	1	—		—		—		20	2
Almería	Total		47	4	6	1	0	0	0	0	0	0	53	5
Elche	2012–13	Segunda División	16	0	0	0	—		—		—		16	0
Elche	2013–14	La Liga	22	1	1	0	—		—		—		23	1
Elche	2014–15	La Liga	21	0	2	0	—		—		—		22	0
Elche	Total		59	1	3	0	0	0	0	0	0	0	62	1
Braga	2015–16	Primeira Liga	12	0	2	0	1	0	—		—		15	0
Tenerife	2016–17	Segunda División	36	4	1	0	—		—		3 (Note: Appearances in La Liga play-offs)	0	40	4
Oviedo	2017–18	Segunda División	35	5	0	0	—		—		—		35	5
Oviedo	2018–19	Segunda División	9	0	1	0	—		—		—		10	0
Oviedo	Total		44	5	1	0	0	0	0	0	0	0	45	5
Johor Darul Ta'zim	2019	Malaysia Super League	3	0	0	0	—		—		—		3	0
Málaga	2019–20	Segunda División	0	0	0	0	—		—		—		0	0
La Nucía	2020–21	Segunda División B	0	0	1	0	—		—		—		1	0
Career total			292	26	23	3	1	0	1	0	4	0	321	29

== Honours ==
Braga

- Taça de Portugal: 2015–16

Johor Darul Takzim

- Malaysia Charity Shield: 2019

Spain U19

- UEFA European Under-19 Championship: 2007

Spain U20

- Mediterranean Games: 2009
