= Yaw Yeboah =

Ghanaian footballer

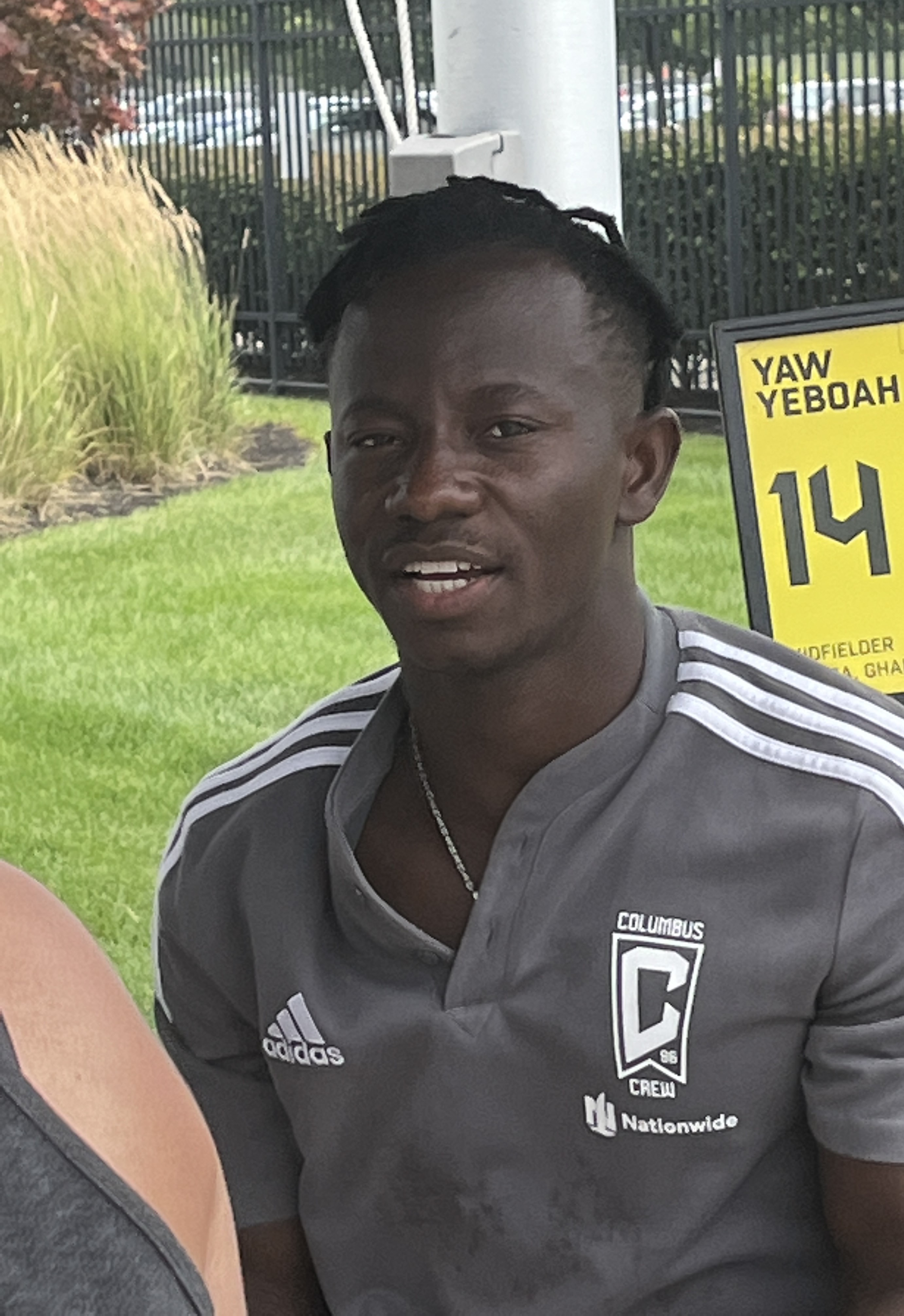
- Yeboah with the Columbus Crew in 2022

Personal information
- Date of birth: 28 March 1997 (age 29)
- Place of birth: Accra, Ghana
- Height: 1.75 m (5 ft 9 in)
- Positions: Winger; wing-back

Team information
- Current team: Qingdao Hainiu
- Number: 7

Youth career
- 2008–2014: Right to Dream Academy

Senior career*
| Years | Team | Apps | (Gls) |
| 2014–2018 | Manchester City | 0 | (0) |
| 2015–2016 | → Lille II (loan) | 20 | (1) |
| 2015–2016 | → Lille (loan) | 3 | (0) |
| 2016–2017 | → Twente (loan) | 26 | (2) |
| 2017–2018 | → Oviedo (loan) | 20 | (0) |
| 2018–2020 | Numancia | 34 | (2) |
| 2019–2020 | → Celta B (loan) | 20 | (5) |
| 2020–2022 | Wisła Kraków | 47 | (9) |
| 2022–2024 | Columbus Crew | 74 | (4) |
| 2023 | Columbus Crew 2 | 1 | (0) |
| 2025 | Los Angeles FC | 17 | (1) |
| 2025 | Los Angeles FC 2 | 1 | (0) |
| 2026– | Qingdao Hainiu | 23 | (8) |

International career^{‡}
| 2015 | Ghana U20 | 10 | (5) |
| 2019 | Ghana U23 | 5 | (2) |
| 2019–2021 | Ghana | 4 | (0) |
- * Club domestic league appearances and goals as of 22 November 2026 ‡ National team caps and goals as of 5 December 2021

Yaw Yeboah (Akan pronunciation: [jaʊ yɛ.bɔa]; born 28 March 1997) is a Ghanaian professional footballer who plays as a winger for Chinese Super League club Qingdao Hainiu. In March 2026, Yeboah was issued a lifetime ban from playing in Major League Soccer after an investigation found that he and former teammate Derrick Jones had bet on matches while playing for the Columbus Crew in the 2024 and 2025 seasons.

== Career ==
=== Manchester City and loans ===
Yeboah joined the Right to Dream Academy in 2008 and graduated in 2014. He joined Manchester City in 2014, and was loaned to Lille, Twente, and Real Oviedo each for one year before permanently signing with Segunda Division team CD Numancia, where he scored on his debut. Following a year with Numancia, he was loaned to Celta de Vigo B for one year. The loan included a purchase option for RC Celta de Vigo.

=== Wisła Kraków ===
On 11 August 2020, Yeboah completed a move to Ekstraklasa side Wisła Kraków, signing a three-year deal. on 18 October 2020, he scored his first and second goals for his new club in a 6–0 victory against Stal Mielec. On 10 September 2021, it was announced that Yeboah was voted as Ekstraklasa Player of the Month for the month of August. Yeboah played 50 matches across all competitions for the club, scoring 10 goals.

=== Major League Soccer ===
==== Columbus Crew ====
On 6 January 2022, Yeboah transferred to Major League Soccer side Columbus Crew, signing a three-year deal. In his first season in MLS, Yeboah played on the right side of a 4–2–3–1 formation. He secured his first assist with the Columbus Crew in the opening match of the season, where his side won 4–0 against the Vancouver Whitecaps. While he initially started 10 out of his first 13 games for his new club, Yeboah's playing time decreased dramatically the rest of the season, making only six appearances for the remainder of the year, all as a substitute. His first season in the United States concluded with no goals and one assist in 20 appearances across all competitions.

During his second season with Columbus, one which Yeboah called “one of the best seasons I’ve ever had,” he took on a new role as a left wingback in a 3–4–3 formation. He began the year as a substitute, and scored his first goal coming off the bench for the Crew in a 4–0 victory against Real Salt Lake on 1 April 2023. An injury to the incumbent starter opened the door for Yeboah to become the full-time starter, a role he would not relinquish. he appeared in 42 total games for Columbus across all competitions, tallying five goals and providing five assists, and scoring the game-winning goal in the MLS Cup Final.

During the 2024 season, Yeboah was a mainstay in the starting lineup the first half of the year, before being dropped after a loss at Inter Miami on 19 June and never returning to the starting lineup. He scored the only goal in a 1–0 win at the Philadelphia Union on 28 August. On 27 November 2024, it was announced that Yeboah would not have his contract renewed.

==== Los Angeles FC ====
On 24 January 2025, Yeboah was signed by Los Angeles FC on a two-year deal. Los Angeles acquired his MLS rights from San Diego FC in exchange for $50,000 in General Allocation Money. San Diego earlier had selected Yeboah in the 2024 MLS Re-Entry Draft in December.

On 25 October 2025, Yeboah, along with former Columbus Crew teammate Derrick Jones, was placed on administrative leave by Major League Soccer pending a review of potential rule violations. While on leave, he is prohibited from participating in team activities and competitions. On 17 January 2026, Yeboah and LAFC mutually agreed to terminate his contract. After leaving the league, on 9 March 2026, following an investigation by the league, he and Jones were issued lifetime bans from the league. The investigation found that the pair had "engaged in extensive gambling" together during the 2024 and 2025 seasons, including in one instance both players betting Jones would receive a yellow card in an October 2024 match, and that they also likely exchanged confidential information with other bettors about how the pair planned to receive yellow cards during certain games.

==== Qingdao Hainiu ====
On 28 February 2026, Yeboah signed with Chinese Super League club Qingdao Hainiu.

== International career ==
=== Youth ===
Yeboah has made appearances for the Ghana U-20 team. He was awarded "most valuable player" in the 2015 African U-20 Championship scoring two goals. He then played in the 2015 FIFA U-20 World Cup, making four appearances and scoring two goals, both from penalties.

=== Senior ===
Yeboah received his first call up on 26 August 2016, for a 2017 Africa Cup of Nations qualification match against Rwanda and a friendly against Russia. He made the bench for the match against Russia, but failed to make an appearance. Yeboah made his senior debut with the Ghana national team in a friendly 1–0 loss to Namibia on 9 June 2019.

== Style of play ==
A left-footed player, Yeboah has been deployed as a winger, an attacking midfielder and at wing-back. He is known for his speed, and his skillful dribbling.

== Personal life ==
Yeboah is a Christian and his father is a pastor.

== Career statistics ==
=== Club ===
As of matches played 25 January 2025

Appearances and goals by club, season and competition
| Club | Season | League | | | National cup (Note: Includes Coupe de France, KNVB Cup, Copa del Rey, Polish Cup, U.S. Open Cup) | | League cup (Note: Includes Coupe de la Ligue) | | Continental | | Other | | Total | |
| Club | Season | Division | Apps | Goals | Apps | Goals | Apps | Goals | Apps | Goals | Apps | Goals | Apps | Goals |
|---|---|---|---|---|---|---|---|---|---|---|---|---|---|---|
| Manchester City | 2014–15 | Premier League | 0 | 0 | 0 | 0 | — | | 0 | 0 | — | | 0 | 0 |
| Lille (loan) | 2015–16 | Ligue 1 | 3 | 0 | 1 | 0 | 1 | 0 | — | | — | | 5 | 0 |
| Twente (loan) | 2016–17 | Eredivisie | 26 | 2 | 1 | 0 | — | | — | | — | | 27 | 2 |
| Real Oviedo (loan) | 2017–18 | Segunda División | 20 | 0 | 1 | 0 | — | | — | | — | | 21 | 0 |
| Numancia | 2018–19 | Segunda División | 34 | 2 | 0 | 0 | — | | — | | — | | 34 | 2 |
| Celta B (loan) | 2019–20 | Segunda División B | 20 | 5 | 0 | 0 | — | | — | | — | | 20 | 5 |
| Wisła Kraków | 2020–21 | Ekstraklasa | 28 | 4 | 3 | 1 | — | | — | | — | | 31 | 5 |
| Wisła Kraków | 2021–22 | Ekstraklasa | 19 | 5 | 0 | 0 | — | | — | | — | | 19 | 5 |
| Wisła Kraków | Total | | 47 | 9 | 3 | 1 | — | | 0 | 0 | — | | 50 | 10 |
| Columbus Crew | 2022 | Major League Soccer | 19 | 0 | 1 | 0 | — | | — | | — | | 20 | 0 |
| Columbus Crew | 2023 | Major League Soccer | 31 | 3 | 2 | 1 | — | | — | | 9 (Note: Six appearances and one goal in MLS Cup playoffs, three appearances in Leagues Cup) | 1 | 42 | 5 |
| Columbus Crew | 2024 | Major League Soccer | 24 | 1 | 0 | 0 | — | | 7 (Note: Appearances in CONCACAF Champions Cup) | 0 | 0 | 0 | 31 | 1 |
| Columbus Crew | Total | | 74 | 4 | 3 | 1 | — | | 7 | 0 | 9 | 1 | 93 | 6 |
| Columbus Crew 2 | 2023 | MLS Next Pro | 1 | 0 | — | | — | | — | | — | | 1 | 0 |
| Career total | | | 225 | 22 | 9 | 2 | 1 | 0 | 7 | 0 | 9 | 1 | 251 | 25 |

=== International ===
As of 16 May 2022

Appearances and goals by national team and year
| National team | Year | Apps | Goals |
|---|---|---|---|
| Ghana | 2019 | 1 | 0 |
| Ghana | 2021 | 3 | 0 |
| Total | | 4 | 0 |

== Honours ==
Columbus Crew

- MLS Cup: 2023
- Leagues Cup: 2024
- CONCACAF Champions Cup runner-up: 2024

Ghana U20

- African U-20 Championship third place: 2015

Individual

- African U-20 Championship Most Valuable Player: 2015
- Ekstraklasa Player of the Month: August 2021
