= Saúl Berjón =

Spanish footballer

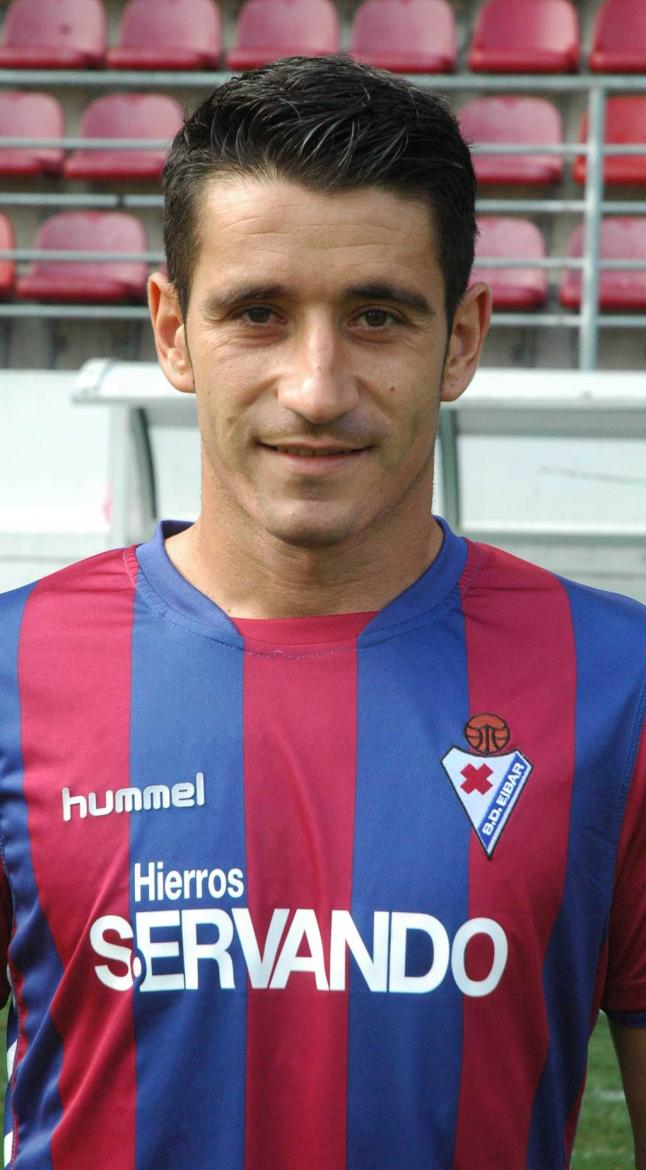
- Berjón with Eibar in 2016

Personal information
- Full name: Saúl Berjón Pérez
- Date of birth: 24 May 1986 (age 40)
- Place of birth: Oviedo, Spain
- Height: 1.78 m (5 ft 10 in)
- Positions: Winger; forward

Youth career
- Covadonga
- Oviedo

Senior career*
Years	Team	Apps	(Gls)
2005	Berrón	6	(1)
2005–2006	Lealtad	35	(12)
2006–2007	Langreo	38	(8)
2007–2008	Pájara Playas	37	(9)
2008–2010	Las Palmas	64	(8)
2010–2012	Barcelona B	26	(3)
2011–2012	→ Alcorcón (loan)	35	(4)
2012–2014	Murcia	76	(12)
2014–2016	Eibar	63	(7)
2016	UNAM	13	(0)
2017–2020	Oviedo	114	(12)
2020–2023	Burgos	62	(2)
Total		569	(78)
- * Club domestic league appearances and goals

Saúl Berjón Pérez (born 24 May 1986) is a Spanish former professional footballer who played as a left winger or forward.

== Club career ==
Born in Oviedo, Asturias, Berjón graduated from Real Oviedo's youth setup, but started playing as a senior with lowly Berrón CF. After representing CD Lealtad and UP Langreo also in the Tercera División, he signed with Segunda División B club UD Pájara Playas de Jandía in summer 2007.

Berjón scored nine goals during the season, and subsequently moved to UD Las Palmas of Segunda División on 19 May 2008. He played his first match as a professional on 30 August, coming on as a substitute for Sergio Suárez in the 56th minute of a 1–0 away loss against Real Sociedad.

Berjón scored his first professional goal on 13 September 2008, in a 2–2 home draw with Real Zaragoza. He added four more in his debut campaign with the Canary Islands side.

On 19 August 2010, Berjón joined FC Barcelona for a €300,000 fee, being assigned to the reserves also in the second division. He appeared regularly for the Catalans, before being loaned to AD Alcorcón in the same league on 30 August 2011.

On 4 August 2012, Berjón signed for Real Murcia CF. After narrowly avoiding relegation in 2012–13 he featured in 43 matches the following season, again scoring six times and providing a league-best 20 assists as the Pimentoneros finished fourth but were relegated due to financial problems.

On 26 August 2014, Berjón agreed to a two-year deal at SD Eibar, newly promoted to La Liga. He made his debut in the competition four days later, replacing Dani García in a 2–1 defeat at Atlético Madrid. He scored his first league goal on 4 September, through a spectacular volley in a 3–3 home draw against Levante UD.

Berjón moved abroad for the first time in his career on 24 June 2016, signing for Mexico's Club Universidad Nacional. On 28 December, he returned to Spain and its second division after joining his first club Oviedo.

On 15 September 2020, the 34-year-old Berjón signed for third-tier Burgos CF. They were promoted at the end of his first season, but he left on 9 January 2023 after falling down the pecking order.

== Personal life ==
Berjón's cousin, Adrián Colunga, was also a footballer. A striker, he played for several clubs during his career.

== Career statistics ==
As of match played 14 February 2021

Appearances and goals by club, season and competition
Club	Season	League			National Cup		Continental		Other		Total	
Club	Season	Division	Apps	Goals	Apps	Goals	Apps	Goals	Apps	Goals	Apps	Goals
Pájara Playas	2007–08	Segunda División B	37	9	—		—		—		37	9
Las Palmas	2008–09	Segunda División	36	5	1	0	—		—		37	5
Las Palmas	2009–10	Segunda División	28	3	1	0	—		—		29	3
Las Palmas	Total		64	8	2	0	0	0	0	0	66	8
Barcelona B	2010–11	Segunda División	26	3	—		—		—		26	3
Alcorcón (loan)	2011–12	Segunda División	35	4	5	0	—		4 (Note: Appearances in La Liga play-offs)	0	44	4
Murcia	2012–13	Segunda División	35	6	1	0	—		—		36	6
Murcia	2013–14	Segunda División	41	6	1	0	—		2	0	44	6
Murcia	Total		76	12	2	0	0	0	2	0	80	12
Eibar	2014–15	La Liga	34	3	0	0	—		—		34	3
Eibar	2015–16	La Liga	29	4	2	0	—		—		31	4
Eibar	Total		63	7	2	0	0	0	0	0	65	7
UNAM	2016–17	Liga MX	13	0	0	0	2 (Note: Appearances in CONCACAF Champions League)	2	—		15	2
Oviedo	2016–17	Segunda División	22	2	0	0	—		—		22	2
Oviedo	2017–18	Segunda División	40	6	0	0	—		—		40	6
Oviedo	2018–19	Segunda División	28	4	0	0	—		—		28	4
Oviedo	2019–20	Segunda División	24	0	0	0	—		—		24	0
Oviedo	Total		114	12	0	0	0	0	0	0	114	12
Burgos	2020–21	Segunda División B	13	2	2	1	—		—		15	3
Career total			441	57	13	1	2	2	6	0	462	60
