= David Costas =

Spanish professional footballer

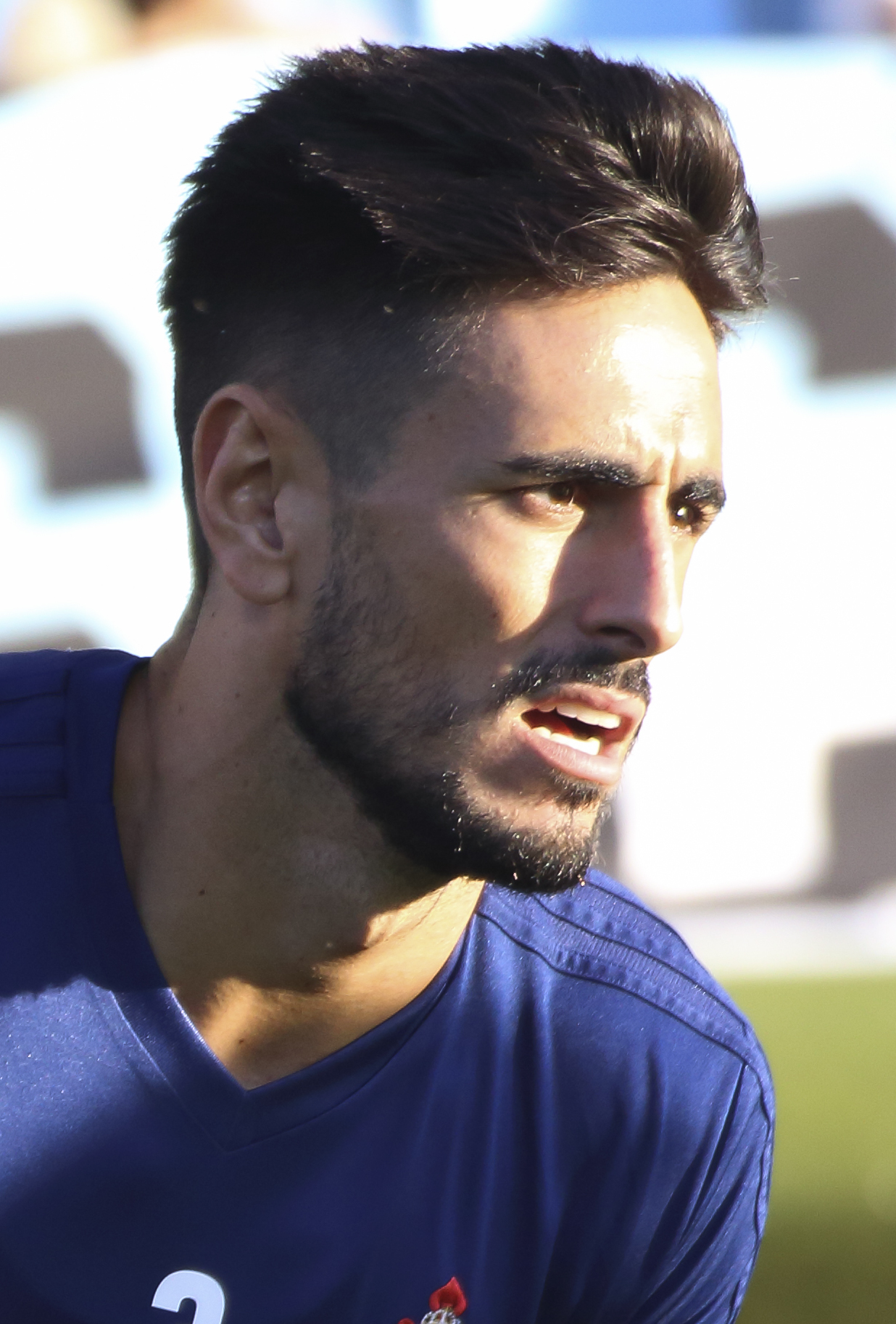
- Costas with Celta in 2018

Personal information
- Full name: David Costas Cordal
- Date of birth: 26 March 1995 (age 31)
- Place of birth: Vigo, Spain
- Height: 1.83 m (6 ft 0 in)
- Position: Centre-back

Team information
- Current team: Oviedo
- Number: 4

Youth career
- Celta

Senior career*
| Years | Team | Apps | (Gls) |
| 2013–2021 | Celta | 40 | (0) |
| 2014 | Celta B | 6 | (0) |
| 2015–2016 | → Mallorca (loan) | 23 | (0) |
| 2017 | → Oviedo (loan) | 19 | (3) |
| 2017–2018 | → Barcelona B (loan) | 37 | (0) |
| 2017 | → Barcelona (loan) | 0 | (0) |
| 2020 | → Almería (loan) | 15 | (0) |
| 2021– | Oviedo | 137 | (4) |

International career
| 2013–2014 | Spain U19 | 8 | (0) |
| 2014 | Spain U21 | 1 | (0) |
- * Club domestic league appearances and goals as of 27 May 2026

David Costas Cordal (born 26 March 1995) is a Spanish professional footballer who plays as a centre-back for Real Oviedo.

== Club career ==
=== Celta ===
Born in Vigo, Galicia, Costas played youth football with hometown's RC Celta de Vigo. On 25 August 2013, only two months after finishing his junior career and without having appeared for the reserves, the 18-year-old made his first-team – and La Liga – debut for the main squad, coming on as a substitute for Augusto Fernández in the 77th minute of a 2–1 away win against Real Betis.

On 31 August 2015, Costas renewed his contract until 2019, being immediately loaned out to RCD Mallorca. On 14 January 2017, he joined fellow second division club Real Oviedo also on loan. He scored his first goal as a professional on 5 February, in the 2–1 home victory over Mallorca which was also his first appearance.

Costas agreed to an extension until 2020 on 31 August 2017, and was then loaned to FC Barcelona Atlètic for one year. He played his first competitive match with the latter's first team on 29 November, replacing Gerard Piqué early into the second half of a 5–0 home defeat of Real Murcia for that season's Copa del Rey.

On 25 January 2020, Costas moved to UD Almería on loan for the remainder of the second-tier campaign. He returned to Celta for 2020–21, but did not play a single minute during the season.

=== Oviedo ===
Costas returned to Oviedo on 12 July 2021, on a three-year deal.

== Career statistics ==
As of match played 16 August 2020

Appearances and goals by club, season and competition
| Club | Season | League | | | National Cup | | Continental | | Other | | Total | |
| Club | Season | Division | Apps | Goals | Apps | Goals | Apps | Goals | Apps | Goals | Apps | Goals |
|---|---|---|---|---|---|---|---|---|---|---|---|---|
| Celta B | 2013–14 | Segunda División B | 6 | 0 | — | | — | | — | | 6 | 0 |
| Celta | 2013–14 | La Liga | 17 | 0 | 1 | 0 | — | | — | | 18 | 0 |
| Celta | 2014–15 | La Liga | 1 | 0 | 2 | 0 | — | | — | | 3 | 0 |
| Celta | 2016–17 | La Liga | 1 | 0 | 1 | 0 | 1 (Note: Appearance in UEFA Europa League) | 0 | — | | 3 | 0 |
| Celta | 2018–19 | La Liga | 15 | 0 | 1 | 0 | — | | — | | 16 | 0 |
| Celta | 2019–20 | La Liga | 6 | 0 | 2 | 0 | — | | — | | 8 | 0 |
| Celta | 2020–21 | La Liga | 0 | 0 | 0 | 0 | — | | — | | 0 | 0 |
| Celta | Total | | 40 | 0 | 7 | 0 | 1 | 0 | 0 | 0 | 48 | 0 |
| Mallorca (loan) | 2015–16 | Segunda División | 23 | 0 | 1 | 0 | — | | — | | 24 | 0 |
| Oviedo (loan) | 2016–17 | Segunda División | 19 | 3 | 0 | 0 | — | | — | | 19 | 3 |
| Barcelona B (loan) | 2017–18 | Segunda División | 37 | 0 | — | | — | | — | | 37 | 0 |
| Barcelona (loan) | 2017–18 | La Liga | 0 | 0 | 1 | 0 | — | | — | | 1 | 0 |
| Almería (loan) | 2019–20 | Segunda División | 15 | 0 | 0 | 0 | — | | 2 (Note: Appearances in La Liga play-offs) | 0 | 17 | 0 |
| Career total | | | 140 | 3 | 9 | 0 | 1 | 0 | 2 | 0 | 152 | 3 |

== Honours ==
Barcelona

- Copa del Rey: 2017–18
