= Francisco Varela (footballer, born 1994) =

Spanish footballer

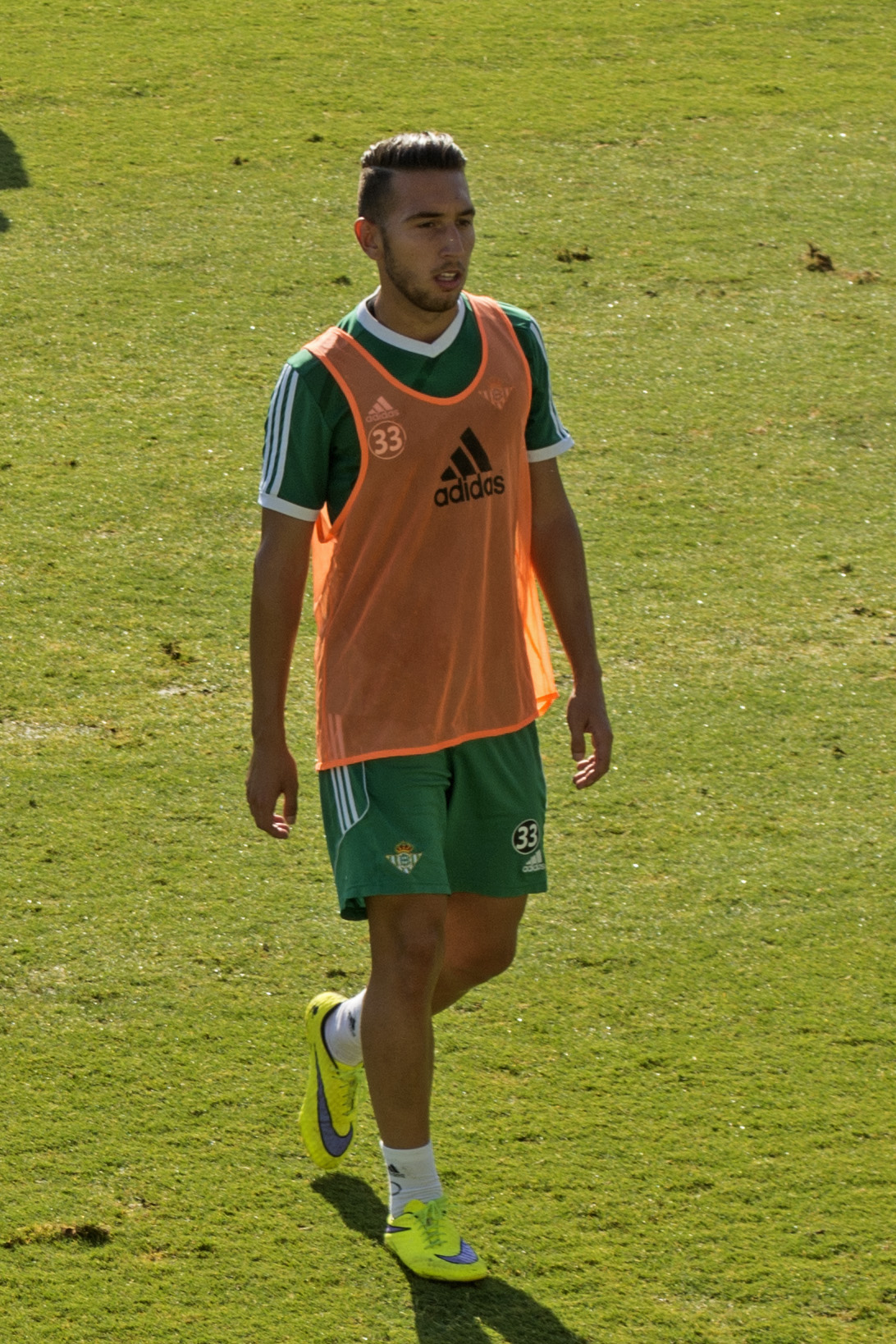
- Varela with Betis in 2015

Personal information
- Full name: Francisco Miguel Varela Martín
- Date of birth: 26 October 1994 (age 32)
- Place of birth: Atarfe, Spain
- Height: 1.74 m (5 ft 9 in)
- Position: Left back

Team information
- Current team: Melilla
- Number: 12

Youth career
- Granada
- 2007–2012: Betis

Senior career*
Years	Team	Apps	(Gls)
2012–2014	Betis B	60	(6)
2014–2016	Betis	36	(0)
2016–2018	Oviedo	24	(1)
2018–2019	Rayo Majadahonda	25	(1)
2019–2021	Belenenses SAD	9	(0)
2020	Belenenses SAD B	2	(0)
2021	San Fernando	15	(0)
2021	Extremadura	15	(0)
2022	Costa Brava	19	(4)
2022–2023	Alcoyano	17	(0)
2023–2024	Linares	47	(1)
2024–2025	Atlético Paso	6	(0)
2025–	Melilla	20	(0)

International career
2012	Spain U18	2	(0)
2012–2013	Spain U19	6	(0)
2012	Spain U20	4	(0)
- * Club domestic league appearances and goals as of 28 September 2025

Francisco Miguel Varela Martín (born 26 October 1994) is a Spanish footballer who plays as a left back for Segunda Federación club Melilla.

Formed at Betis, where he made 14 La Liga appearances, he played 71 games and scored two goals in Segunda División for that team, Oviedo and Rayo Majadahonda. He also had a brief spell in the Portuguese Primeira Liga with Belenenses SAD.

== Club career ==
=== Betis ===
Born in Atarfe, Granada, Andalusia, Varela graduated from Real Betis' youth setup, after starting it out at neighbouring Granada CF. He made his senior debuts with the reserves in the 2011–12 campaign, in Segunda División B.

On 4 May 2013 Varela was called up to the main squad for a La Liga match against FC Barcelona, but was an unused substitute in the eventual 2–4 away loss a day later. He played his first match as a professional on 27 February 2014, replacing Rubén Castro in the 81st minute of a 2–0 away win against FC Rubin Kazan in that season's UEFA Europa League.

Varela renewed his contract with the Verdiblancos on 24 July 2014, running until 2016. He made his league debut on 23 November, starting in a 1–2 home loss against Deportivo Alavés in the Segunda División championship.

On 5 May 2015, Varela renewed his contract for a further season, and subsequently achieved promotion to La Liga after appearing in 22 matches. He made his debut in the category on 27 September, starting in a 2–1 away win against Sporting de Gijón.

=== Oviedo and Majadahonda ===
On 14 July 2016, Varela signed a two-year contract with Real Oviedo in the second level, after being deemed surplus to requirements by new manager Gus Poyet. He scored his only goal for the Asturians on 11 December with a late direct free kick nine minutes after replacing Néstor Susaeta in a 2–1 loss at Real Zaragoza, but later lost his starting place under manager Fernando Hierro and ended his season in April 2017 to undergo surgery on his left knee.

Varela moved to fellow league team CF Rayo Majadahonda on 6 July 2018. He played 26 times as the newly promoted side went straight back down, and scored once to open a 4–3 loss at Oviedo on his return to the Estadio Carlos Tartiere on 4 June 2019; the loss in the penultimate game of the season confirmed their relegation.

=== B-SAD ===
On 30 July 2019, after Rayo's relegation, Varela moved abroad for the first time by signing for Portugal's Belenenses SAD on a three-year deal. He made his debut in the Primeira Liga in the season opener on 9 August, starting in a goalless draw at Portimonense SC. He lost his place to the unrelated youngster Nilton Varela after Petit became the manager, could not find a new suitor in the January 2020 transfer window, and following a shoulder operation in his homeland in March did not return to Lisbon again.

=== Return to Spain ===
In January 2021, Varela went back to his country, signing for third-tier San Fernando CD. He spent the following season in the new league at the same level, the Primera División RFEF, split between Extremadura UD and UE Costa Brava who were both relegated; he scored a career-best four goals, all for the latter club, including two in a 3–0 home win over UCAM Murcia CF on 7 May 2022.

On 15 July 2022, Varela signed for another team in the same league, CD Alcoyano. The following 12 January, he made another mid-season switch, to Linares Deportivo.

== Statistics ==
As of match played on 23 December 2017

Club	Season	League			Cup		Other		Total	
Club	Season	Division	Apps	Goals	Apps	Goals	Apps	Goals	Apps	Goals
Betis B	2009–10	Segunda División B	2	0	—		—		2	0
Betis B	2012–13	Segunda División B	34	3	—		—		34	3
Betis B	2013–14	Tercera División	14	3	—		4 (Note: Appearances in Promotion Play-offs)	0	18	3
Betis B	2014–15	Segunda División B	10	0	—		—		10	3
Betis B	Total		60	6	—		4	0	64	6
Betis	2012–13	La Liga	0	0	0	0	—		0	0
Betis	2013–14	La Liga	0	0	0	0	1 (Note: Appearance in UEFA Europa League)	0	1	0
Betis	2014–15	Segunda División	22	0	0	0	—		22	0
Betis	2015–16	La Liga	14	0	2	0	—		16	0
Betis	Total		36	0	2	0	1	0	39	0
Oviedo	2016–17	Segunda División	16	1	0	0	—		16	1
Oviedo	2017–18	Segunda División	2	0	0	0	—		2	0
Oviedo	Total		18	1	0	0	—		18	1
Career total			114	7	2	0	5	0	121	7
