= Nahuel Valentini =

Argentine footballer

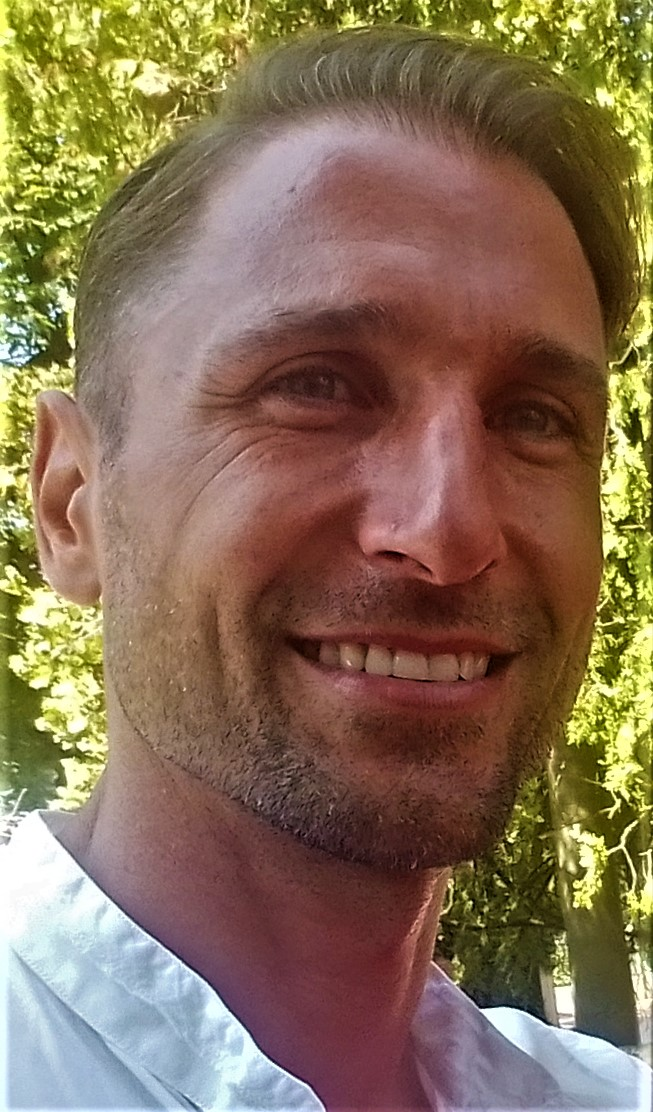
- Nahuel Valentini in 2013.

Personal information
- Date of birth: 16 November 1988 (age 37)
- Place of birth: Rosario, Argentina
- Height: 1.82 m (6 ft 0 in)
- Position: Centre back

Team information
- Current team: Scandicci

Senior career*
| Years | Team | Apps | (Gls) |
| 2008–2013 | Rosario Central | 125 | (2) |
| 2013–2014 | Livorno | 16 | (0) |
| 2014–2017 | Spezia | 90 | (3) |
| 2017–2018 | Oviedo | 7 | (0) |
| 2018–2020 | Ascoli | 37 | (1) |
| 2020–2023 | Padova | 61 | (2) |
| 2021 | → Vicenza (loan) | 12 | (2) |
| 2023–2024 | SPAL | 32 | (4) |
| 2024–2025 | Sestri Levante | 32 | (3) |
| 2025– | Scandicci | 31 | (2) |
- * Club domestic league appearances and goals as of 26 April 2026

Nahuel Valentini (born 16 November 1988) is an Argentine footballer who plays as a central defender for Italian Serie D club Scandicci.

== Club career ==
On 16 August 2018, he joined Serie B club Ascoli on a one-year contract with one-year extension option.

On 9 September 2020 he signed a 2-year contract with Padova. On 21 January 2021 he was loaned to Serie B club Vicenza.

On 18 August 2023, Valentini joined SPAL on a one-season deal.

On 18 September 2024, Valentini signed with Sestri Levante.
