= Héctor Nespral =

Spanish footballer

Personal information
- Full name: Héctor Fernández Fernández-Nespral
- Date of birth: 8 February 1993 (age 33)
- Place of birth: Oviedo, Spain
- Position: Midfielder

Team information
- Current team: Unionistas
- Number: 8

Youth career
- 2004–2012: Oviedo

Senior career*
Years	Team	Apps	(Gls)
2012–2016	Oviedo B	108	(18)
2012–2013	→ Astur (loan)	26	(2)
2016–2017	Oviedo	2	(0)
2017–2019	Langreo	66	(12)
2019–2020	Barakaldo	14	(4)
2020-	Unionistas	114	(9)
- * Club domestic league appearances and goals as of 5 April 2024

Héctor Fernández Fernández-Nespral (born 8 February 1993) is a Spanish footballer who plays for Unionistas de Salamanca CF as a central midfielder.

== Club career ==
Born in Oviedo, Asturias, Héctor joined Real Oviedo's youth setup in 2004, aged 11. He made his senior debut with the reserves on 10 March 2012, coming on as a second-half substitute in a 0–1 home loss against CD Cudillero in the Tercera División championship.

In November 2012, Héctor was loaned to Astur CF until the end of the season. After returning from his loan stint, he was a regular starter for the B-side in the fourth tier, scoring a career-best nine goals in the 2015–16 campaign.

On 4 June 2016 Héctor made his professional debut, starting in a 0–5 away loss against CA Osasuna in the Segunda División championship. On 19 August, he was definitely promoted to the main squad. For 2017/2018 season Nespral moved to UP Langreo and was able to promote to the Segunda División B.
