= Borja Domínguez =

Spanish footballer

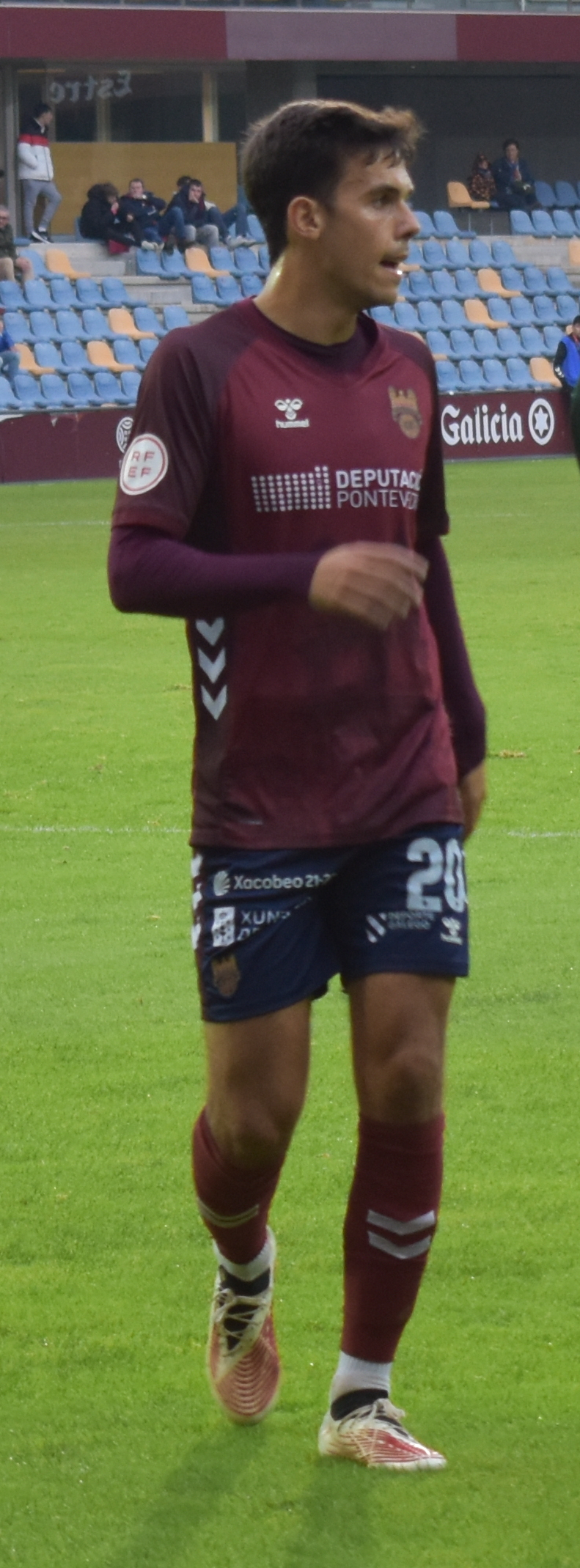
- Domínguez with Pontevedra in 2022

Personal information
- Full name: Borja Domínguez Domínguez
- Date of birth: 30 May 1992 (age 34)
- Place of birth: Vigo, Spain
- Height: 1.86 m (6 ft 1 in)
- Position: Midfielder

Youth career
- Alert Travesas
- Celta

Senior career*
Years	Team	Apps	(Gls)
2011–2016	Celta B	72	(0)
2011–2012	→ Ourense (loan)	12	(0)
2012	→ Villalonga (loan)	14	(1)
2015–2016	→ Racing Ferrol (loan)	38	(9)
2016–2017	Córdoba	14	(1)
2017	→ Oviedo (loan)	10	(2)
2017–2019	Alcorcón	23	(0)
2019	→ Pontevedra (loan)	15	(3)
2019–2021	Lugo	25	(1)
2021–2022	Racing Santander	30	(1)
2022–2024	Pontevedra	55	(1)
2024–2025	Coruxo	22	(1)
- * Club domestic league appearances and goals as of 4 May 2025

Borja Domínguez Domínguez (born 30 May 1992) is a Spanish footballer who plays as a central midfielder.

== Club career ==
Born in Vigo, Galicia, Domínguez was a Celta de Vigo youth graduate. He made his senior debut with the reserves on 24 April 2011, starting in a 0–4 Segunda División B home loss against CD Guadalajara.

For the 2011–12 campaign, Domínguez was loaned to CD Ourense and Villalonga FC, both in Tercera División.

On 9 July 2015, Domínguez moved to fellow third-tier club Racing de Ferrol, in a season-long loan deal. On 1 July of the following year, after scoring a career-best nine goals, he signed a two-year contract with Segunda División side Córdoba CF.

Domínguez made his professional debut on 20 August 2016, coming on as a second-half substitute for Pedro Ríos in a 1–0 home win against CD Tenerife.

On 31 January 2017, Domínguez joined Oviedo on loan until June. On 6 July, he signed a permanent three-year deal with AD Alcorcón, still in the second tier.

On 24 January 2019, after being rarely used during the campaign, Domínguez was loaned to third division side Pontevedra CF until June. He terminated his contract with the Alfareros on 9 July, and signed a three-year contract with CD Lugo also in the second level just hours later.

On 9 August 2021, Domínguez terminated his contract with Lugo. A day later, Domínguez moved to third division side Racing de Santander on two-years deal.
