= 2012–13 Elche CF season =

Elche CF
2012–13 season
- Segunda División: League starts in August 2012
- Copa Del Rey: Entering into Second Round
Home colours	Away colours	Third colours

The 2012–13 Elche CF season is the 80th season in club history.

== Competitions ==
=== Segunda División ===
==== Matches ====
Win Draw Loss

19 August 2012 1	Elche	4 - 2	Ponferradina	Elche
21:00	Xumetra 14'; Albácar 37' (pen.); Coro 41'; Carles Gil 63'	Summary	Yuri 23'; Carlos Ruiz 60'	Stadium: Martínez Valero; Attendance: 6793; Referee: Pino Zamorano

26 August 2012 2	Hércules	1 - 2	Elche

1 September 2012 3	Elche	3 - 1	Las Palmas

9 September 12 4	Córdoba	0 - 1	Elche

15 September 12 5	Elche	2 - 1	Real Sporting

6	Huesca	0 - 0	Elche

7	Elche	3 - 0	Recreativo

8	Mirandés	1 - 2	Elche

9	Elche	4 - 0	Numancia

10	Murcia	1 - 0	Elche

11	Elche	1 - 0	Racing Santander

12	Lugo	1 - 0	Elche

13	Xerez	0 - 0	Elche

14	Elche	1 - 0	Alcorcón

15	Girona	0 - 1	Elche

16	Elche	1 - 0	Villarreal

17	Barcelona B	1 - 1	Elche

18	Elche	1 - 0	Almería

19	Real Madrid Castilla	0 - 1	Elche

20	Elche	3 - 2	Sabadell

21	Guadalajara	0 - 0	Elche

22	Ponferradina	1 - 1	Elche

23	Elche	2 - 0	Hércules

24	Las Palmas	0 - 0	Elche

25	v

26	v

27	v

28	v

29	v

30	v

31	v

32	v

33	v

34	v

35	v

36	v

37	v

38	v

39	v

40	v

41	v

42	v

=== Copa Del Rey ===
Second Round	v

== Squad ==
=== Starting 11 ===
Manu Herrera

Jordi Xumetra

Coro
