= Héctor Verdés =

Spanish footballer

Personal information
- Full name: Héctor Verdés Ortega
- Date of birth: 24 June 1984 (age 42)
- Place of birth: Villar del Arzobispo, Spain
- Height: 1.84 m (6 ft 0 in)
- Position: Centre-back

Youth career
- Valencia

Senior career*
Years	Team	Apps	(Gls)
2004–2008	Valencia B	40	(2)
2007–2008	→ Xerez (loan)	21	(2)
2008–2009	Barcelona B	22	(1)
2010	Valencia B	15	(0)
2010–2013	Elche	45	(0)
2013–2015	Alcorcón	62	(8)
2015–2018	Oviedo	55	(2)
2018–2019	Rayo Majadahonda	25	(1)
2019–2020	Castellón	8	(0)
Total		293	(16)
- * Club domestic league appearances and goals

Héctor Verdés Ortega (born 24 June 1984) is a Spanish former professional footballer who played as a central defender.

== Club career ==
Born in Villar del Arzobispo, Valencian Community, Verdés was a product of Valencia CF's youth system. After never making it past their reserves in three full seasons, he served a loan with Xerez CD in the Segunda División, appearing in exactly half of the matches as the Andalusians finished in 15th position; in summer 2008, he was released by his parent club.

For the 2008–09 campaign, Verdés moved to the Segunda División B, playing under young manager Luis Enrique at FC Barcelona Atlètic. He returned to Valencia after one year, spending an additional season with the reserve side – also in division three – which ended in relegation.

Verdés signed for Elche CF, also in his native region and the second division, in July 2010. After three seasons of irregular playing time, featuring in 24 games in the first one and just 21 in the following two, mainly due to injuries, he moved to AD Alcorcón in the same league.

On 29 June 2015, Verdés agreed to a two-year deal at Real Oviedo, newly promoted to the second tier. On 20 July 2018, he joined fellow third-division CF Rayo Majadahonda as a free agent.

After suffering relegation, Verdés signed with CD Castellón of the third division on 18 July 2019. In February 2020, the 35-year-old announced his retirement due to constant injury problems.

== Honours ==
Elche

- Segunda División: 2012–13
