= Néstor Susaeta =

Spanish footballer

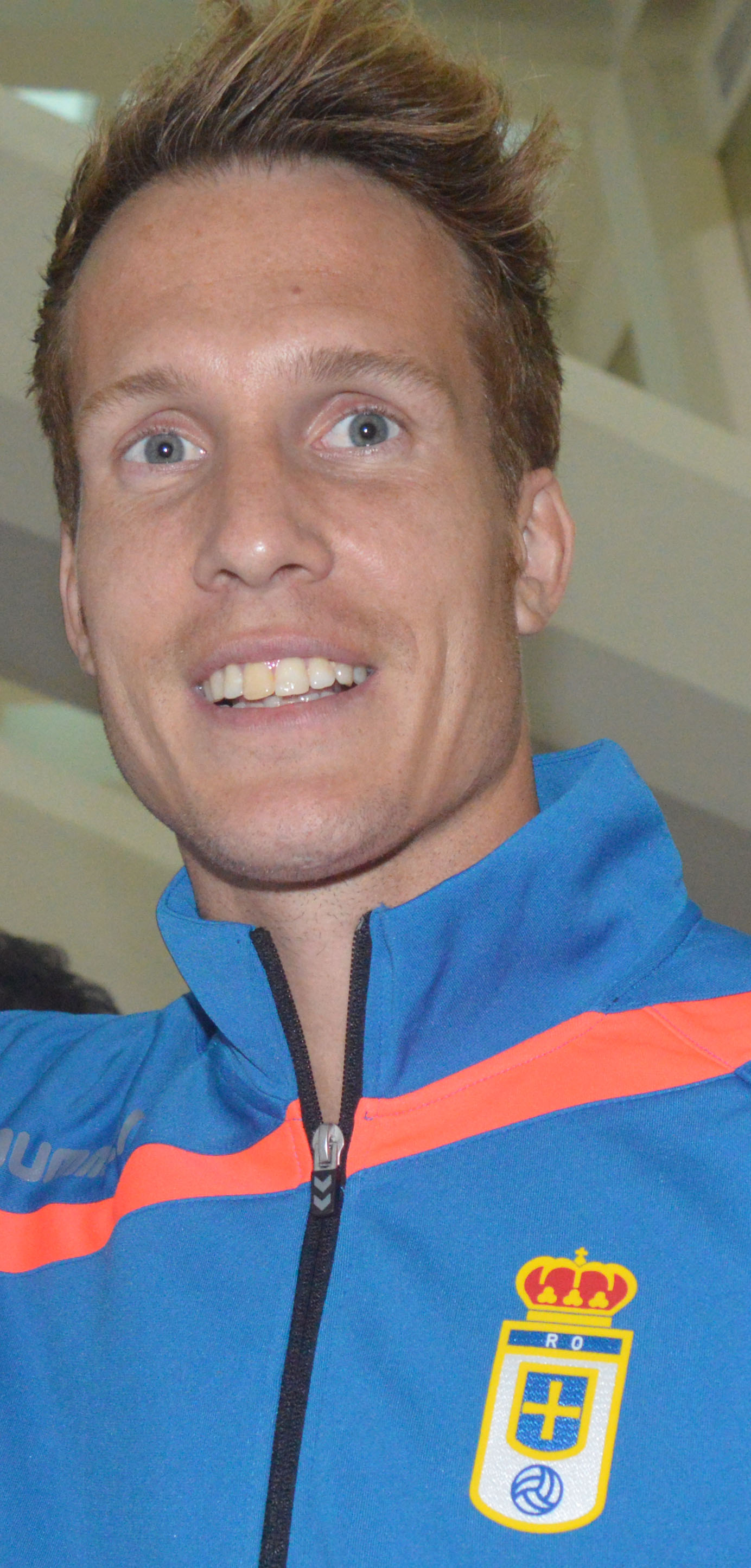
- Susaeta with Oviedo in 2015

Personal information
- Full name: Néstor Susaeta Jaurrieta
- Date of birth: 11 December 1984 (age 41)
- Place of birth: Eibar, Spain
- Height: 1.77 m (5 ft 10 in)
- Position: Winger

Youth career
- Real Sociedad

Senior career*
Years	Team	Apps	(Gls)
2003–2007	Real Sociedad B	66	(9)
2006	→ Eibar (loan)	11	(0)
2006–2007	→ Salamanca (loan)	21	(0)
2007–2008	Bilbao Athletic	14	(0)
2008–2009	Alcorcón	36	(14)
2009–2011	Rayo Vallecano	47	(8)
2012	Lausanne-Sport	6	(0)
2012–2013	Guadalajara	24	(1)
2013–2017	Oviedo	146	(27)
2017–2020	Albacete	92	(6)
2020–2022	Rayo Majadahonda	37	(4)
Total		500	(69)
- * Club domestic league appearances and goals

Néstor Susaeta Jaurrieta (born 11 December 1984) is a Spanish former professional footballer who played as a winger.

Having been on the books of Real Sociedad and Athletic Bilbao without making a first-team appearance, he spent most of his career in the Segunda División, totalling 271 games and 25 goals for six clubs. He represented mostly Rayo Vallecano, Oviedo and Albacete, also making two La Liga appearances for the first of those teams.

== Club career ==
Born in Eibar, Gipuzkoa, Susaeta began his career with Real Sociedad. He only appeared for the reserves during his spell with the Txuri-urdin, also being loaned to SD Eibar and UD Salamanca – both clubs in the Segunda División – and being released in 2007.

In that summer, Susaeta joined Basque neighbours Athletic Bilbao on a two-year deal, but again only featured with the B side, in the Segunda División B. In his sole season he received little playing time and trialled for Scotland's Hamilton Academical in December 2007 before being released. He signed for another team in that level, AD Alcorcón, being one of the most important players as they reached the promotion playoffs, ultimately falling short.

Susaeta moved to Rayo Vallecano of division two on a free transfer in June 2009, appearing in 31 games in his first year but in only 14 the following (three starts) as the club returned to La Liga after an eight-year absence. Having played two top-flight matches, on 3 January 2012 he terminated his contract and signed with FC Lausanne-Sport of the Swiss Super League until 30 June, with the option of another term.

Susaeta left at the end of the campaign, and moved to CD Guadalajara in July 2012. One year later, following his team's relegation from the second tier, he signed a two-year deal with Real Oviedo in the third.

On 2 August 2017, Susaeta joined Albacete Balompié as a free agent. He terminated his contract with the club on 24 July 2020, and signed for third division side CF Rayo Majadahonda.

== Personal life ==
Susaeta's cousin, Markel, was also a footballer and a winger. He spent most of his professional career with Athletic Bilbao.

== Honours ==
Oviedo

- Segunda División B: 2014–15
