= 2026–27 RC Celta de Vigo season =

Celta Vigo
2026–27 season
- President: Marián Mouriño
- Head coach: Claudio Giráldez
- Stadium: Balaídos
- La Liga: 14th
- Copa del Rey: First round
- UEFA Europa League: League phase
Home colours	Away colours	Third colours

The 2026–27 season is the 104th season in the history of RC Celta de Vigo, and the club's 15th consecutive season in La Liga. In addition to the domestic league, the club are also competing in the Copa del Rey and the UEFA Europa League.

== Players ==
=== First-team squad ===
As of 1 September 2026

Note: Flags indicate national team as defined under FIFA eligibility rules; some limited exceptions apply. Players may hold more than one non-FIFA nationality.

No.	Pos.	Nation	Player
1	GK	TUR	Altay Bayındır (on loan from Manchester United)
2	DF	SWE	Carl Starfelt
3	DF	ESP	Marcos Alonso
4	DF	SEN	Abdoulaye Faye (on loan from Bayer Leverkusen)
5	DF	ESP	Sergio Carreira
6	MF	GUI	Ilaix Moriba
7	FW	ESP	Borja Iglesias
8	MF	ESP	Miguel Román
9	FW	ESP	Ferran Jutglà
10	FW	ESP	Iago Aspas (captain)
11	FW	ESP	Pablo Durán
13	GK	ROU	Ionuț Radu
14	MF	ESP	Aleix Febas

No.	Pos.	Nation	Player
15	DF	ESP	Álvaro Núñez
16	FW	ESP	Hugo González
17	DF	ESP	Javi Rueda
18	DF	ESP	Yoel Lago
19	FW	SWE	Williot Swedberg
20	DF	ESP	Javi Rodríguez
21	DF	URU	Sebastián Cáceres
22	DF	ESP	Javi Galán
23	FW	ESP	Hugo Álvarez
24	FW	MAR	Couhaib Driouech
25	GK	ESP	Iván Villar
39	FW	MAR	Jones El-Abdellaoui

=== Reserve team ===
Note: Flags indicate national team as defined under FIFA eligibility rules; some limited exceptions apply. Players may hold more than one non-FIFA nationality.

No.	Pos.	Nation	Player
26	GK	ESP	Coke Carrillo
27	DF	ESP	Quique Ribes

No.	Pos.	Nation	Player
28	MF	ESP	Andrés Antañón
30	MF	ESP	Hugo Burcio

=== Out on loan ===
Note: Flags indicate national team as defined under FIFA eligibility rules; some limited exceptions apply. Players may hold more than one non-FIFA nationality.

No.	Pos.	Nation	Player
—	DF	ESP	Carlos Domínguez (at Oviedo until 30 June 2027)
—	DF	ESP	Unai Núñez (at Espanyol until 30 June 2027)
—	DF	ESP	Manu Sánchez (at Levante until 30 June 2027)

No.	Pos.	Nation	Player
—	MF	ESP	Carlos Dotor (at Málaga until 30 June 2027)
—	MF	ESP	Damián Rodríguez (at Cádiz until 30 June 2027)
—	MF	ESP	Hugo Sotelo (at Levante until 30 June 2027)

== Transfers ==
=== In ===
Pos.	Player	Transferred from	Fee	Date	Source
DF	(Spain) Unai Núñez	(Spain) Valencia	Loan return	30 June 2026	
MF	(Spain) Damián Rodríguez	(Spain) Racing Santander	Loan return	30 June 2026	
MF	(Spain) Aleix Febas	(Spain) Elche	Free	1 July 2026	
DF	(Spain) Javi Galán	(Spain) Osasuna	Free	2 July 2026	
DF	(Senegal) Abdoulaye Faye	(Germany) Bayer Leverkusen	Loan	3 August 2026	
GK	(Turkey) Altay Bayındır	(England) Manchester United	Loan	7 August 2026	
FW	(Morocco) Couhaib Driouech	(Netherlands) PSV Eindhoven	€7,000,000	25 August 2026	
DF	(Uruguay) Sebastián Cáceres	(Mexico) América	€4,500,000	1 September 2026	

=== Out ===
Pos.	Player	Transferred to	Fee	Date	Source
MF	(Spain) Fer López	(England) Wolverhampton Wanderers	Loan return	30 June 2026	
DF	(Ghana) Joseph Aidoo		End of contract	1 July 2026	
MF	(Argentina) Franco Cervi	(Argentina) Rosario Central	End of contract	1 July 2026	
DF	(Serbia) Mihailo Ristić	(Serbia) Red Star Belgrade	End of contract	1 July 2026	
MF	(Spain) Óscar Mingueza	(England) Crystal Palace	End of contract	1 July 2026	
GK	(Spain) Marc Vidal	(Spain) Sabadell	End of contract	1 July 2026	
MF	(Spain) Hugo Sotelo	(Spain) Levante	Loan	20 July 2026	
MF	(Spain) Damián Rodríguez	(Spain) Cádiz	Loan	1 August 2026	
DF	(Spain) Unai Núñez	(Spain) Espanyol	Loan	6 August 2026	
DF	(Spain) Carlos Domínguez	(Spain) Real Oviedo	Loan	11 August 2026	
DF	(Spain) Manu Fernández	(Spain) Cádiz	Transfer	21 August 2026	
MF	(Uruguay) Matías Vecino		Contract terminated	21 August 2026	
MF	(Spain) Carles Pérez	(Spain) Girona	Contract terminated	1 September 2026	

== Competitions ==
=== La Liga ===
==== League table ====
Pos	Team	Pld	W	D	L	GF	GA	GD	Pts
11	Deportivo A Coruña	13	3	6	4	16	17	−1	15
12	Racing Santander	12	4	2	6	17	30	−13	14
13	Celta Vigo	13	2	7	4	11	12	−1	13
14	Rayo Vallecano	12	3	3	6	15	22	−7	12
15	Getafe	12	3	3	6	8	18	−10	12

Updated to match(es) played on 21 November 2026. Source: LaLiga EA Sports
Rules for classification: 1) Points; 2) Head-to-head points; 3) Head-to-head goal difference; 4) Goal difference; 5) Goals scored; 6) Fair-play points (if three or more teams tied); 7) Play-off at neutral site.
(Note: Head-to-head record is used only after all the matches between the teams in question have been played)

==== Results summary ====
Overall								Home						Away					
Pld	W	D	L	GF	GA	GD	Pts	W	D	L	GF	GA	GD	W	D	L	GF	GA	GD
13	2	7	4	11	12	−1	13	2	3	2	9	6	+3	0	4	2	2	6	−4

Last updated: 21 November 2026.
Source: La Liga

==== Results by round ====
Round	2	1	3	6	4	5	7	8	9	10	11	12	13
Ground	A	H	H	A	A	H	H	A	H	H	A	H	A
Result	D	L	L	D	D	D	W	D	W	D	L	D	L
Position													

Updated to match(es) played on 21 November 2026. Source: La Liga
A = Away; H = Home; W = Win; D = Draw; L = Loss

==== Matches ====
22 August 2026 1	Valencia	0–0	Celta Vigo	Valencia
19:30 CEST (UTC+2)	de Haas (yellow card) 38'; Dimitrievski (yellow card) 39'		Carreira (yellow card) 57'; Rueda (yellow card) 67'; Radu (yellow card) 80'	Stadium: Mestalla Stadium; Attendance: 43,684; Referee: Jesús Gil Manzano

27 August 2026 2	Celta Vigo	1–2	Osasuna	Vigo
20:30 CEST (UTC+2)	Aspas 14'; Alonso (yellow card) 51' (red card)		Dubasin (yellow card) 27'; Barja 54'; Budimir 64' (pen.)	Stadium: Balaídos Stadium; Attendance: 20,645; Referee: Miguel Sesma Espinosa

30 August 2026 3	Celta Vigo	0–2	Athletic Bilbao	Vigo
21:30 CEST (UTC+2)			Berenguer 20'; Navarro 22', (yellow card) 61'; Berchiche (yellow card) 48'; Gerenabarrena (yellow card) 71'	Stadium: Balaídos Stadium; Attendance: 20,902; Referee: Mateo Busquets Ferrer

3 September 2026 4	Real Sociedad	0–0	Celta Vigo	San Sebastián
21:00 CEST (UTC+2)	Herrera (yellow card) 22'; Sučić (yellow card) 81'		Lago (yellow card) 52'; Alonso (yellow card) 57'; Driouech (yellow card) 79'	Stadium: Anoeta Stadium; Attendance: 30,364; Referee: Víctor García Verdura

7 September 2026 5	Getafe	1–1	Celta Vigo	Getafe
19:00 CEST (UTC+2)	Satriano 21'; Mojica (yellow card) 45+6'; Romero (yellow card) 55' (yellow-red card) 67'; Terrats (yellow card) 85'	Report	Starfelt 57', (yellow card) 77'; Alonso (yellow card) 85'	Stadium: Estadio Coliseum; Attendance: 4,672; Referee: César Soto Grado

13 September 2026 6	Celta Vigo	1–1	Málaga	Vigo
14:00 CEST (UTC+2)	Lago (yellow card) 26'; Jutglà 41'		Galilea (yellow card) 24'; Niño 83'	Stadium: Balaídos Stadium; Attendance: 18,575; Referee: Carlos Muñiz Muñoz

19 September 2026 7	Celta Vigo	5–0	Racing Santander	Vigo
18:30 CEST (UTC+2)	González 32'; Moriba 43'; Rueda (yellow card) 45+3'; Román 69'; Lago (yellow card) 73'; Durán 78', 90+2'		Zabiri (yellow card) 57'; Belocian (yellow card) 64'; Ramón (yellow card) 75'; Canales (yellow card) 90'; Vicente (yellow card) 90+3'	Stadium: Balaídos Stadium; Attendance: 19,505; Referee: Ricardo de Burgos Bengoetxea

11 October 2026 8	Elche	0–0	Celta Vigo	Elche
14:00 CEST (UTC+2)	Aguado (yellow card) 90+1'		Lago (yellow card) 37'; Rueda (yellow card) 59'; Febas (yellow card) 81'	Stadium: Estadio Martínez Valero; Attendance: 19,505; Referee: Ricardo de Burgos Bengoetxea

18 October 2026 9	Celta Vigo	2–1	Alavés	Elche
16:15 CEST (UTC+2)	Cáceres (yellow card) 15'; Jutglà 53'; J. Rodríguez 71'		Martínez (yellow card) 45'; Novoa 87'	Stadium: Estadio Martínez Valero; Attendance: 25,470; Referee: Javier Alberola Rojas

25 October 2026 10	Celta Vigo	0–0	Real Betis	Vigo
16:15 CET (UTC+1)	Moriba (yellow card) 30'; Carreira (yellow card) 80'		Llorente (yellow card) 43'	Stadium: Balaídos Stadium; Attendance: 20,007; Referee: Isidro Díaz de Mera Escuderos

31 October 2026 11	Rayo Vallecano	3–0	Celta	Madrid
16:15 CET (UTC+1)	López (yellow card) 26', (goal) 73'; de Frutos 36', 55'; Bouare (yellow card) 72'	Report	Swedberg (yellow card) 82'	Stadium: Vallecas Stadium; Attendance: 11,714; Referee: Manuel Orellana Cid

8 November 2026 12	Celta Vigo	0–0	Levante	Vigo
17:30 CET (UTC+1)	Galán (yellow card) 88'	Report	Requena (yellow card) 32'; Dela (yellow card) 63'	Stadium: Balaídos; Attendance: 19,207; Referee: Miguel Ángel Ortiz Arias

21 November 2026 13	Real Madrid	2–1	Celta Vigo	Madrid
21:00 CET (UTC+1)	Mbappé (penalty missed) 38'; Bellingham 66'; Espí 85', (yellow card) 90+4'	Report	Durán 6'; Lago (yellow card) 74'; Rodríguez (yellow card) 82'	Stadium: Bernabéu; Attendance: 74,241; Referee: Adrián Cordero Vega

=== UEFA Europa League ===
==== League phase ====
Pos	Team	Pld	W	D	L	GF	GA	GD	Pts
25	(Slovenia) Celje	4	1	1	2	5	9	−4	4
26	(Austria) Red Bull Salzburg	4	1	1	2	3	8	−5	4
27	(Spain) Celta Vigo	4	1	0	3	4	6	−2	3
28	(Italy) Milan	4	1	0	3	4	7	−3	3
29	(Poland) Jagiellonia Białystok	4	1	0	3	4	7	−3	3

Updated to match(es) played on 5 November 2026. Source: UEFA
Rules for classification: League phase tiebreakers

Round	1	2	3	4
Ground	A	H	A	H
Result	L	L	W	L
Position		28	25	27

Updated to match(es) played on 22 October 2026. Source: UEFA
A = Away; H = Home; W = Win; D = Draw; L = Loss

16 September 2026 1	Omonia (Cyprus)	1–0	(Spain) Celta Vigo	Cyprus
19:45 UTC+3	Balkovec 88'		Swedberg (yellow card) 68'	Stadium: GSP Stadium; Attendance: 11,271; Referee: Berke Balázs (Hungary)

15 October 2026 2	Celta Vigo (Spain)	1–2	(Italy) Juventus	Vigo, Spain
21:00 CEST (UTC+2)	Álvarez 18'; Swedberg (yellow card) 39'; Moriba (yellow card) 84'	Report	Kelly (yellow card) 54'; Woltemade 58'; Lucumí (yellow card) 72'; Kolo Muani 90+2'	Stadium: Balaídos; Attendance: 21,805; Referee: Sander van der Eijk (Netherlands)

22 October 2026 3	Celtic (Scotland)	1–2	(Spain) Celta Vigo	Glasgow, Scotland
21:00 CEST (UTC+2)	Durán (yellow card) 23'; Baur 47'; Scales (yellow card) 85'; Sørensen (yellow card) 89'; Donovan (yellow card) 90+2'	Report	Rodríguez 68', 71'	Stadium: Celtic Park; Attendance: 48,374; Referee: Georgi Kabakov (Bulgaria)

5 November 2026 4	Celta Vigo (Spain)	1–2	(Belgium) Union Saint-Gilloise	Vigo, Spain
21:00 CET (UTC+1)	Durán 11', (yellow card) 90+5'	Report	Zeneli 35', 49', (penalty missed) 80'; Guilherme Smith (yellow card) 71'	Stadium: Balaídos; Referee: Aliyar Aghayev (Azerbaijan)
