= 2025–26 RC Celta de Vigo season =

Celta Vigo
2025–26 season
- President: Marián Mouriño
- Head coach: Claudio Giráldez
- Stadium: Balaídos
- La Liga: 6th
- Copa del Rey: Round of 32
- UEFA Europa League: Quarter-finals
- Top goalscorer: League: Borja Iglesias (14); All: Borja Iglesias (18)
| Home colours | Away colours | Third colours |

The 2025–26 season was the 103rd season in the history of RC Celta de Vigo, and the club's 14th consecutive season in La Liga. In addition to the domestic league, the club participated in the Copa del Rey and the UEFA Europa League.

== Players ==
=== First-team squad ===
As of 3 February 2026

Note: Flags indicate national team as defined under FIFA eligibility rules; some limited exceptions apply. Players may hold more than one non-FIFA nationality.

| No. | Pos. | Nation | Player |
|---|---|---|---|
| 1 | GK | ESP | Iván Villar |
| 2 | DF | SWE | Carl Starfelt |
| 3 | DF | ESP | Óscar Mingueza |
| 4 | DF | GHA | Joseph Aidoo |
| 5 | DF | ESP | Sergio Carreira |
| 6 | MF | GUI | Ilaix Moriba |
| 7 | FW | ESP | Borja Iglesias |
| 8 | MF | ESP | Fer López (on loan from Wolverhampton Wanderers) |
| 9 | FW | ESP | Ferran Jutglà |
| 10 | FW | ESP | Iago Aspas (captain) |
| 11 | FW | ARG | Franco Cervi |
| 12 | DF | ESP | Manu Fernández |
| 13 | GK | ROU | Ionuț Radu |
| 14 | DF | ESP | Álvaro Núñez |

| No. | Pos. | Nation | Player |
|---|---|---|---|
| 15 | MF | URU | Matías Vecino |
| 16 | MF | ESP | Miguel Román |
| 17 | DF | ESP | Javi Rueda |
| 18 | FW | ESP | Pablo Durán |
| 19 | FW | SWE | Williot Swedberg |
| 20 | DF | ESP | Marcos Alonso |
| 21 | DF | SRB | Mihailo Ristić |
| 22 | MF | ESP | Hugo Sotelo |
| 23 | FW | ESP | Hugo Álvarez |
| 24 | DF | ESP | Carlos Domínguez |
| 25 | GK | ESP | Marc Vidal |
| 29 | MF | ESP | Yoel Lago |
| 32 | DF | ESP | Javi Rodríguez |
| 39 | FW | MAR | Jones El-Abdellaoui |

=== Reserve team ===
Note: Flags indicate national team as defined under FIFA eligibility rules; some limited exceptions apply. Players may hold more than one non-FIFA nationality.

| No. | Pos. | Nation | Player |
|---|---|---|---|
| 28 | FW | ESP | Ángel Arcos |
| 30 | FW | ESP | Hugo González |
| 31 | DF | ESP | Pablo Meixús |
| 33 | FW | ESP | Óscar Marcos |

| No. | Pos. | Nation | Player |
|---|---|---|---|
| 36 | MF | ESP | Andrés Antañón |
| 38 | MF | ESP | Hugo Burcio |
| 40 | GK | ESP | Marcos González |

=== Out on loan ===
Note: Flags indicate national team as defined under FIFA eligibility rules; some limited exceptions apply. Players may hold more than one non-FIFA nationality.

| No. | Pos. | Nation | Player |
|---|---|---|---|
| — | DF | ESP | Unai Núñez (at Hellas Verona until 30 June 2026) |
| — | DF | ESP | Manu Sánchez (at Levante until 30 June 2026) |

| No. | Pos. | Nation | Player |
|---|---|---|---|
| — | MF | ESP | Carlos Dotor (at Málaga until 30 June 2026) |
| — | FW | ESP | Carles Pérez (at Aris until 30 June 2026) |

== Transfers ==
=== In ===
| Pos. | Player | Transferred from | Fee | Notes | Date | Source |
|---|---|---|---|---|---|---|
| GK | (Romania) Ionuț Radu | (Italy) Venezia | | Free transfer | 9 June 2025 | |
| MF | (Guinea) Ilaix Moriba | (Germany) RB Leipzig | | Transfer | 16 June 2025 | |
| FW | (Spain) Ferran Jutglà | (Belgium) Club Brugge | | Transfer | 24 June 2025 | |
| MF | (Spain) Carlos Dotor | (Spain) Málaga | | Loan | 8 July 2025 | |
| FW | (Spain) Bryan Zaragoza | (Germany) Bayern Munich | | Loan | 30 July 2025 | |
| FW | (Spain) Borja Iglesias | (Spain) Real Betis | | Transfer | 12 August 2025 | |
| FW | (Argentina) Tadeo Allende | (United States) Inter Miami | | Return from loan | 31 December 2025 | |

=== Out ===
| Pos. | Player | Transferred to | Fee | Notes | Date | Source |
|---|---|---|---|---|---|---|
| FW | (Spain) Miguel Rodríguez | (Netherlands) Utrecht | | Purchase option exercised in loan contract | 15 April 2025 | |
| MF | (Spain) Fer López | (England) Wolverhampton Wanderers | | Transfer | 20 June 2025 | |
| FW | (Norway) Jørgen Strand Larsen | (England) Wolverhampton Wanderers | | Transfer | 1 July 2025 | |
| MF | (Spain) Alfon | (Spain) Sevilla | | Free transfer | 1 July 2025 | |
| FW | (Spain) Carles Pérez | (Greece) Aris | | Loan | 10 July 2025 | |
| DF | (Spain) Unai Nuñez | (Italy) Hellas Verona | | Loan | 25 July 2025 | |
| DF | (Spain) Manu Sánchez | (Spain) Levante | | Loan | 25 July 2025 | |
| MF | (United States) Luca de la Torre | (United States) Charlotte FC | | Transfer | 30 December 2025 | |
| MF | (Spain) Damián Rodríguez | (Spain) Racing Santander | | Loan | 6 January 2026 | |
| FW | (Argentina) Tadeo Allende | (United States) Inter Miami | | Transfer | 26 January 2026 | |

== Friendlies ==
| 15 July 2025 Friendly | Celta | 0–2 | Famalicão |
| | | | Elisor 41'; de Haas 48' |

| 19 July 2025 Friendly | Braga | 3–1 | Celta |
| | Gorby 22'; Zalazar 36' (.pen); Rodrigues 87' | | El-Abdellaoui 52' |

| 29 July 2025 Friendly | Grasshoppers | 0–3 | Celta | GC/Campus, Niederhasli |
| 15:00 CEST (UTC+2) | | Report | 9' Moriba; 13' El-Abdellaoui; 58' Durán | Referee: Sandro Schärer |

| 1 August 2025 Friendly | Vitória S.C. | 1–0 | Celta |
| | Camara 52' |

| 9 August 2025 Friendly | Wolverhampton Wanderers | 0–1 | Celta Vigo | Wolverhampton |
| 15:00 BST | | Report | Durán 58' | Stadium: Molineux Stadium |

== Competitions ==
=== La Liga ===
==== League table ====
| Pos | Team | Pld | W | D | L | GF | GA | GD | Pts | Qualification or relegation |
|---|---|---|---|---|---|---|---|---|---|---|
| 4 | Atlético Madrid | 38 | 21 | 6 | 11 | 62 | 44 | +18 | 69 | Qualification for the Champions League league phase (Note: La Liga gained an additional Champions League place as a result of Spain gaining one of the two European Performance Spots (EPS) awarded to the two associations with the highest UEFA coefficient points in 2025–26.) |
| 5 | Real Betis | 38 | 15 | 15 | 8 | 59 | 48 | +11 | 60 | Qualification for the Champions League league phase |
| 6 | Celta Vigo | 38 | 14 | 12 | 12 | 53 | 48 | +5 | 54 | Qualification for the Europa League league phase |
| 7 | Getafe | 38 | 15 | 6 | 17 | 32 | 38 | −6 | 51 | Qualification for the Conference League play-off round |
| 8 | Rayo Vallecano | 38 | 12 | 14 | 12 | 41 | 44 | −3 | 50 | |

Source: LaLiga EA Sports
Rules for classification: 1) Points; 2) Head-to-head points; 3) Head-to-head goal difference; 4) Goal difference; 5) Goals scored; 6) Fair-play points
(Note: Head-to-head record is used only after all the matches between the teams in question have been played)

==== Matches ====
The league schedule was released on 1 July 2025.

| 17 August 2025 1 | Celta Vigo | 0–2 | Getafe | Vigo |
| 17:00 CEST (UTC+2) | Swedberg (yellow card) 56'; Rodríguez (yellow card) 87'; Alonso (yellow card) 90' | Report | Uche (yellow card) 45', (goal) 72'; Liso 47'; Soria (yellow card) 81' | Stadium: Abanca-Balaídos; Attendance: 20,530; Referee: Iosu Galech Apezteguía |

| 23 August 2025 2 | Mallorca | 1–1 | Celta Vigo | Palma |
| 17:00 CEST (UTC+2) | Asano (yellow card) 51'; Mascarell (yellow card) 55'; Joseph 87' | Report | Rueda 38'; Aspas (yellow card) 67'; Sotelo (yellow card) 71'; Domínguez (yellow card) 74' | Stadium: Estadi Mallorca Son Moix; Attendance: 16,274; Referee: José Luis Guzmán Mansilla |

| 27 August 2025 3 | Celta Vigo | 1–1 | Real Betis | Vigo |
| 21:00 CEST (UTC+2) | Álvarez 47'; Lago (yellow card) 74' | Report | Altimira (yellow card) 34'; Bartra 45'; García (yellow card) 90+4' | Stadium: Abanca-Balaídos; Attendance: 20,302; Referee: Jesús Gil Manzano |

| 31 August 2025 4 | Celta Vigo | 1–1 | Villarreal | Vigo |
| 17:00 CEST (UTC+2) | Román (yellow card) 67'; Iglesias 90+4' | Report | Pépé 53'; Gueye (yellow card) 70' | Stadium: Abanca-Balaídos; Attendance: 20,172; Referee: Alejandro Quintero González |

| 14 September 2025 5 | Celta Vigo | 1–1 | Girona | Vigo |
| 14:00 CEST (UTC+2) | Iglesias 90+2' (pen.) | Report | Vanat 12'; Ounahi (yellow card) 26'; Francés (yellow card) 80'; Gil (yellow card) 90+1' | Stadium: Abanca-Balaídos; Attendance: 18,862; Referee: Adrián Cordero Vega |

| 21 September 2025 6 | Rayo Vallecano | 1–1 | Celta Vigo | Madrid |
| 14:00 CEST (UTC+2) | Palazón (yellow card) 40'; De Frutos 65' | Report | Iglesias 49'; Rueda (yellow card) 55' | Stadium: Vallecas; Attendance: 13,028; Referee: Víctor García Verdura |

| 28 September 2025 7 | Elche | 2–1 | Celta Vigo | Elche |
| 16:15 CEST (UTC+2) | Silva 18'; Mir (penalty missed) 54'; Josan (yellow card) 64'; Donald 68'; Affengruber (yellow card) 70'; Pedrosa (yellow card) 72' | Report | Mingueza (yellow card) 17'; Iglesias 22'; Lago (yellow card) 57'; Román (yellow card) 85' | Stadium: Martínez Valero; Attendance: 26,708; Referee: Guillermo Cuadra Fernández |

| 5 October 2025 8 | Celta Vigo | 1–1 | Atlético Madrid | Vigo |
| 21:00 CEST (UTC+2) | Iglesias (yellow card) 65'; Aspas 68' | Report | Starfelt 6' (o.g.); Lenglet (yellow card) 25' (yellow-red card) 40'; Baena (yellow card) 78' | Stadium: Abanca-Balaídos; Attendance: 20,877; Referee: César Soto Grado |

| 19 October 2025 9 | Celta Vigo | 1–1 | Real Sociedad | Vigo |
| 16:15 CEST (UTC+2) | Durán 20'; Starfelt (yellow card) 30' (yellow-red card); Rueda (yellow card) 56'; Moriba (yellow card) 90+5' | Report | Gómez (yellow card) 33'; Zubeldia (yellow card) 37'; Herrera (yellow card) 45+1'; Soler 89' | Stadium: Abanca-Balaídos; Attendance: 19,102; Referee: José María Sánchez Martínez |

| 26 October 2025 10 | Osasuna | 2–3 | Celta Vigo | Pamplona |
| 18:30 CEST (UTC+2) | Budimir 37' (pen.), 46', (penalty missed) 79'; Catena (yellow card) 62'; Bretones (yellow card) 87'; Boyomo (yellow card) 90' | Report | Jutglà (yellow card) 13', (goal) 26', 69'; Fernández (yellow card) 35'; Rodríguez (yellow card) 53'; Iglesias (yellow card) 66'; Durán 87' | Stadium: El Sadar; Attendance: 20,065; Referee: Alejandro José Hernández Hernández |

| 2 November 2025 11 | Levante | 1–2 | Celta Vigo | Valencia |
| 14:00 CEST (UTC+2) | Vencedor (red card) 29'; Etta Eyong (penalty missed) 37'; Toljan (yellow card) 59'; Arriaga 66'; Elgezabal (yellow card) 69' | Report | Alonso (yellow card) 31'; Mingueza 40'; Starfelt (yellow card) 73'; Carreira (yellow card) 88'; Román 90+1' | Stadium: Ciutat de València; Attendance: 19,513; Referee: Alejandro Quintero González |

| 9 November 2025 12 | Celta Vigo | 2–4 | Barcelona | Vigo |
| 21:00 CET (UTC+1) | Carreira 11'; Iglesias 43'; Román (yellow card) 89' | Report | Lewandowski 10' (pen.), 37', 73', (yellow card) 88'; Cubarsí (yellow card) 42'; Yamal 45+4'; De Jong (yellow card) 79' (yellow-red card) 90+4'; Rashford (yellow card) 87' | Stadium: Abanca-Balaídos; Attendance: 21,887; Referee: Javier Alberola Rojas |

| 22 November 2025 13 | Alavés | 0–1 | Celta Vigo | Vitoria-Gasteiz |
| 14:00 CET (UTC+1) | Jonny (yellow card) 5'; Pacheco (yellow card) 68' | Report | Rodríguez (yellow card) 17'; Rueda (yellow card) 51'; Aspas 55' (pen.) | Stadium: Mendizorroza; Attendance: 16,582; Referee: Juan Martínez Munuera |

| 30 November 2025 14 | Celta Vigo | 0–1 | Espanyol | Vigo |
| 18:30 CET (UTC+1) | Jutglà (yellow card) 90+5' | Report | González (yellow card) 72'; García 86'; Romero (yellow card) 90+5' | Stadium: Abanca-Balaídos; Attendance: 20,031; Referee: Isidro Díaz de Mera Escuderos |

| 7 December 2025 15 | Real Madrid | 0–2 | Celta Vigo | Madrid |
| 21:00 UTC+1 | F. García (yellow card) 63' (yellow-red card) 64'; Carreras (yellow card) 90+1' (yellow-red card) 90+1'; Valverde (yellow card) 90+2'; Rodrygo (yellow card) 90+2'; Endrick (red card) 90+2' | Report | Swedberg 53', 90+3'; Moriba (yellow card) 83' | Stadium: Bernabéu; Attendance: 74,511; Referee: Alejandro Quintero González |

| 14 December 2025 16 | Celta Vigo | 2–0 | Athletic Bilbao | Vigo |
| 16:15 UTC+1 | Jutglà (yellow card) 44'; Swedberg 48'; El-Abdellaoui 55'; Aspas (yellow card) 77'; Iglesias (yellow card) 90+6' | Report | N. Williams (penalty missed) 65'; I. Williams (yellow card) 66'; Vivian (yellow card) 87' | Stadium: Abanca-Balaídos; Attendance: 20,505; Referee: Alejandro Hernández Hernández |

| 20 December 2025 17 | Oviedo | 0–0 | Celta Vigo | Oviedo |
| 14:00 UTC+1 | Colombatto (yellow card) 25'; Ahijado (yellow card) 33' | Report | Fernández (yellow card) 60' | Stadium: Carlos Tartiere; Attendance: 23,613; Referee: Francisco José Hernández Maeso |

| 3 January 2026 18 | Celta Vigo | 4–1 | Valencia | Vigo |
| 14:00 UTC+1 | Iglesias 33' (pen.), 59'; Rodríguez (yellow card) 79'; El-Abdellaoui 83'; Álvarez 90+4' | Report | Pepelu (penalty missed) 7', 70'; Duro (yellow card) 53'; Ramazani (yellow card) 62'; Copete (yellow card) 74' | Stadium: Abanca-Balaídos; Attendance: 20,475; Referee: Ricardo de Burgos Bengoetxea |

| 12 January 2026 19 | Sevilla | 0–1 | Celta Vigo | Seville |
| 21:00 CET (UTC+1) | Romero (yellow card) 61'; Sánchez (yellow card) 75'; Mendy (yellow card) 86' | Report | Moriba (yellow card) 34'; Alonso 88' (pen.); Mingueza (yellow card) 89'; Álvarez (yellow card) 90+3' | Stadium: Ramón Sánchez-Pizjuán; Attendance: 31,383; Referee: José María Sánchez Martínez |

| 18 January 2026 20 | Celta Vigo | 3–0 | Rayo Vallecano | Vigo |
| | Carreira 40'; Álvarez (yellow card) 44'; Zaragoza 54' (pen.); Sotelo (yellow card) 58'; Aspas (yellow card) 65'; Mingueza (yellow card) 66'; Rueda 79' | Report | Gumbau (yellow card) 58'; Martín (yellow card) 59'; Palazón (yellow card) 65'; Mendy (red card) 66' | Stadium: Abanca-Balaídos; Attendance: 20,835; Referee: Mateo Busquets Ferrer |

| 25 January 2026 21 | Real Sociedad | 3–1 | Celta Vigo | San Sebastián |
| 18:30 | Sučić (yellow card) 16'; Oyarzabal 17', 75'; Ćaleta-Car (red card) 45+2'; Matarazzo (yellow card) 64'; Méndez 90+6' | Report | Zaragoza (yellow card) 45+3'; Iglesias 72' | Stadium: Reale Arena; Attendance: 29,682; Referee: Javier Alberola Rojas |

| 1 February 2026 22 | Getafe | 0–0 | Celta Vigo | Getafe |
| 18:30 | Satriano (yellow card) 35' | Report | Moriba (yellow card) 19'; Iglesias (yellow card) 61' | Stadium: Coliseum; Attendance: 7,363; Referee: Iosu Galech Apezteguía |

| 6 February 2026 23 | Celta Vigo | 1–2 | Osasuna | Vigo |
| 21:00 | Iglesias 53' (pen.); Rueda (yellow card) 56'; Carreira (yellow card) 78' | Report | Budimir 35'; Ru. García (yellow card) 45+1'; Ra. García 79'; Rosier (yellow card) 90+1' | Stadium: Abanca-Balaídos; Attendance: 18,705; Referee: José Luis Munuera Montero |

| 14 February 2026 24 | Espanyol | 2–2 | Celta Vigo | Cornellà de Llobregat |
| 14:00 | García 66'; Dolan 86'; Cabrera (yellow card) 90+4' | Report | Jutglà 38'; Iglesias 90+3' | Stadium: RCDE Stadium; Attendance: 27,368; Referee: Guillermo Cuadra Fernández |

| 22 February 2026 25 | Celta Vigo | 2–0 | Mallorca | Vigo |
| 18:30 | Aspas 85' (pen.), 90+5'; Iglesias (yellow card) 90+8' | Report | Muriqi (yellow card) 12'; Mascarell (yellow card) 47'; Lato (yellow card) 52'; Mojica (yellow card) 90+2'; Raillo (yellow card) 90+8' | Stadium: Abanca-Balaídos; Attendance: 19,689; Referee: José Luis Guzmán Mansilla |

| 1 March 2026 26 | Girona | 1–2 | Celta Vigo | Girona |
| 21:00 | Vanat 35'; Echeverri (yellow card) 81'; Martínez (yellow card) 89' | Report | Jutglà (yellow card) 42', (goal) 58'; Vitor Reis 70' (o.g.); Swedberg (yellow card) 89' | Stadium: Montilivi; Attendance: 11,371; Referee: Miguel Ángel Ortiz Arias |

| 6 March 2026 27 | Celta Vigo | 1–2 | Real Madrid | Vigo |
| 21:00 UTC+1 | Iglesias 25' | Report | Tchouaméni 11'; Valverde 90+4' | Stadium: Abanca-Balaídos; Attendance: 22,048; Referee: Isidro Díaz de Mera Escuderos |

| 15 March 2026 28 | Real Betis | 1–1 | Celta Vigo | Seville |
| | Bellerín 49' | Report | Jutglà 4' | Stadium: La Cartuja; Attendance: 58,689; Referee: José María Sánchez Martínez |

| 22 March 2026 29 | Celta Vigo | 3–4 | Alavés | Vigo |
| | Jutglà 19', 37'; Álvarez 27' | Report | Martínez 48', 74'; Pérez 50'; Rebbach 78' | Stadium: Abanca-Balaídos; Attendance: 20,260; Referee: Miguel Sesma Espinosa |

| 5 April 2026 30 | Valencia | 2–3 | Celta Vigo | Valencia |
| | Rodríguez 12', 90+3' | Report | Moriba 56'; López 60'; Swedberg 81' | Stadium: Mestalla; Attendance: 43,764; Referee: Iosu Galech Apezteguía |

| 12 April 2026 31 | Celta Vigo | 0–3 | Oviedo | Vigo |
| | | Report | Reina 4'; Viñas 45', 57' | Stadium: Abanca-Balaídos; Attendance: 20,360; Referee: Miguel Ángel Ortiz Arias |

| 22 April 2026 32 | Barcelona | 1–0 | Celta Vigo | Barcelona |
| 21:30 CEST (UTC+2) | Yamal 40' (pen.); E. Garcia (yellow card) 90+2' | Report | Lago (yellow card) 59' | Stadium: Camp Nou; Attendance: 59,034; Referee: José Luis Munuera Montero |

| 26 April 2026 33 | Villarreal | 2–1 | Celta Vigo | Villarreal |
| | Gerard 2' (pen.); Pépé 29' | Report | Iglesias 73' (pen.) | Stadium: Estadio de la Cerámica; Attendance: 16,895; Referee: Alejandro Quintero González |

| 3 May 2026 34 | Celta Vigo | 3–1 | Elche | Vigo |
| | Álvarez 14'; Aspas 30'; Iglesias 85' | Report | Silva 82' (pen.) | Stadium: Abanca-Balaídos; Attendance: 15,401; Referee: Ricardo de Burgos Bengoetxea |

| 9 May 2026 35 | Atlético Madrid | 0–1 | Celta Vigo | Madrid |
| 18:30 CEST (UTC+2) | Baena (yellow card) 66' | Report | Moriba (yellow card) 19'; Iglesias 62'; López (yellow card) 77' | Stadium: Riyadh Air Metropolitano; Attendance: 52,643; Referee: Iosu Galech Apezteguía |

| 13 May 2026 36 | Celta Vigo | 2–3 | Levante | Vigo |
| | Jutglà 4', 48' | Report | Arriaga 43'; De la Fuente 57'; Brugué | Stadium: Abanca-Balaídos; Attendance: 19,185; Referee: Adrián Cordero Vega |

| 17 May 2026 37 | Athletic Bilbao | 1–1 | Celta Vigo | Bilbao |
| | I. Williams 52' | Report | Swedberg 4' | Stadium: San Mamés; Referee: Isidro Díaz de Mera Escuderos |

| 23 May 2026 38 | Celta Vigo | 1–0 | Sevilla | Vigo |
| 21:00 CEST (UTC+2) | Moriba (yellow card) 38', (goal) 51' | Report | Maupay (yellow card) 90+6' | Stadium: Abanca-Balaídos; Attendance: 20,901; Referee: Francisco José Hernández Maeso |

==== Copa del Rey ====
| 30 October 2025 First round | Puerto de Vega | 0–2 | Celta Vigo | Navia |
| 19:00 | | Report | | Stadium: El Pardo |
Note: Puerto de Vega did not play the match in their main stadium El Campón, Puerto de Vega, as it did not meet the broadcasting requirements.

| 4 December 2025 Second round | Sant Andreu | 1–1 (a.e.t.) (6–7 p) | Celta Vigo | Barcelona |
| 21:00 | García 103' | Report | Iglesias 105' | Stadium: Narcís Sala |
| | Penalties |
| | García (penalty scored); Marcet (penalty scored); Blanco (penalty scored); Naranjo (penalty scored); Lucas Viña (penalty scored); Torices (penalty scored); Serrano (penalty missed) | | (penalty scored) Mingueza; (penalty scored) Iglesias; (penalty scored) Aspas; (penalty scored) Álvarez; (penalty scored) Beltrán; (penalty scored) Durán; (penalty scored) Lago |

| 17 December 2025 Round of 32 | Albacete | 2–2 (a.e.t.) (3–0 p) | Celta Vigo | Albacete |
| 19:00 | Jefté 18'; Vallejo 90+3' | Report | Lago 64'; Iglesias 75' | Stadium: Carlos Belmonte; Attendance: 12,106; Referee: José Luis Guzmán Mansilla |
| | Penalties |
| | Puertas (penalty scored); Riki (penalty scored); Vallejo (penalty scored) | | (penalty missed) Mingueza; (penalty missed) Álvarez; (penalty missed) Aspas |

=== UEFA Europa League ===
==== League phase ====
The draw for the league phase was held on 29 August 2025.

| Pos | Team | Pld | W | D | L | GF | GA | GD | Pts | Qualification |
|---|---|---|---|---|---|---|---|---|---|---|
| 14 | (Football Association of the Czech Republic) Viktoria Plzeň | 8 | 3 | 5 | 0 | 8 | 3 | +5 | 14 | Advance to knockout phase play-offs (seeded) |
| 15 | (Football Association of Serbia) Red Star Belgrade | 8 | 4 | 2 | 2 | 7 | 6 | +1 | 14 | Advance to knockout phase play-offs (seeded) |
| 16 | (Royal Spanish Football Federation) Celta Vigo | 8 | 4 | 1 | 3 | 15 | 11 | +4 | 13 | Advance to knockout phase play-offs (seeded) |
| 17 | (Hellenic Football Federation) PAOK | 8 | 3 | 3 | 2 | 17 | 14 | +3 | 12 | Advance to knockout phase play-offs (unseeded) |
| 18 | (French Football Federation) Lille | 8 | 4 | 0 | 4 | 12 | 9 | +3 | 12 | Advance to knockout phase play-offs (unseeded) |

Source: UEFA
Rules for classification: League phase tiebreakers

==== Matches ====
| 25 September 2025 1 | VfB Stuttgart (Germany) | 2–1 | (Spain) Celta Vigo | Stuttgart, Germany |
| 21:00 | Bouanani 51'; El Khannouss 68' | Report | Iglesias 86' | Stadium: MHPArena; Attendance: 58,000; Referee: Nick Walsh |

| 2 October 2025 2 | Celta Vigo (Spain) | 3–1 | (Greece) PAOK | Vigo, Spain |
| 21:00 | Aspas 45+2'; Iglesias 53'; Swedberg 70' | Report | Giakoumakis 37' | Stadium: Balaídos; Attendance: 20,849; Referee: Igor Pajač |

| 23 October 2025 3 | Celta Vigo (Spain) | 2–1 | (France) Nice | Vigo, Spain |
| 21:00 | Aspas 2'; Oppong 75' (o.g.) | Report | Cho 16' | Stadium: Balaídos; Attendance: 20,631; Referee: Sander van der Eijk |

| 6 November 2025 4 | Dinamo Zagreb (Croatia) | 0–3 | (Spain) Celta Vigo | Zagreb, Croatia |
| 18:45 | | Report | Durán 4', 44'; S. Domínguez 28' (o.g.) | Stadium: Stadion Maksimir; Attendance: 19,431; Referee: Anastasios Papapetrou |

| 27 November 2025 5 | Ludogorets Razgrad (Bulgaria) | 3–2 | (Spain) Celta Vigo | Razgrad, Bulgaria |
| 18:45 (19:45 UTC+2) | Stanić 11' (pen.), 49', 62' (pen.) | Report | Durán 70'; El-Abdellaoui 90+6' | Stadium: Huvepharma Arena; Attendance: 4,779; Referee: Balázs Berke |

| 11 December 2025 6 | Celta Vigo (Spain) | 1–2 | (Italy) Bologna | Vigo, Spain |
| 21:00 | Zaragoza 17' | Report | Bernardeschi 66' (pen.), 74' | Stadium: Balaídos; Attendance: 20,302; Referee: Radu Petrescu |

| 22 January 2026 7 | Celta Vigo (Spain) | 2–1 | (France) Lille | Vigo, Spain |
| 21:00 | Swedberg 1'; Starfelt 69' | Report | Giroud 86' | Stadium: Balaídos; Attendance: 20,015; Referee: Harm Osmers |

| 29 January 2026 8 | Red Star Belgrade (Serbia) | 1–1 | (Spain) Celta Vigo | Belgrade, Serbia |
| 21:00 | Duarte 89' | Report | López 88' | Stadium: Red Star Stadium; Attendance: 39,116; Referee: Andrea Colombo |

==== Knockout phase ====
===== Knockout phase play-offs =====
| 19 February 2026 First leg | PAOK (Greece) | 1–2 | (Spain) Celta Vigo | Thessaloniki, Greece |
| 18:45 | Jeremejeff 77' | Report | Aspas 34'; Swedberg 43' | Stadium: Toumba Stadium; Attendance: 20,448; Referee: Ivan Kružliak (Slovakia) |

| 26 February 2026 Second leg | Celta Vigo (Spain) | 1–0 (3–1 agg.) | (Greece) PAOK | Vigo, Spain |
| 21:00 | Swedberg 63' | Report | | Stadium: Balaídos; Attendance: 21,344; Referee: Marco Guida (Italy) |

===== Round of 16 =====
| 12 March 2026 First leg | Celta Vigo (Spain) | 1–1 | (France) Lyon | Vigo, Spain |
| 21:00 | Rueda 25' | Report | Endrick 87' | Stadium: Balaídos; Attendance: 21,673; Referee: Erik Lambrechts (Belgium) |

| 19 March 2026 Second leg | Lyon (France) | 0–2 (1–3 agg.) | (Spain) Celta Vigo | Décines-Charpieu, France |
| 18:45 | | Report | Rueda 61'; Jutglà 90+2' | Stadium: Parc Olympique Lyonnais; Attendance: 41,764; Referee: Irfan Peljto (Bosnia and Herzegovina) |

===== Quarter-finals =====
| 9 April 2026 First leg | SC Freiburg (Germany) | 3–0 | (Spain) Celta Vigo | Freiburg, Germany |
| 21:00 | Grifo 10'; Beste 32'; Ginter 78' | Report | | Stadium: Europa-Park Stadion; Attendance: 32,600; Referee: Glenn Nyberg (Sweden) |

| 16 April 2026 Second leg | Celta Vigo (Spain) | 1–3 (1–6 agg.) | (Germany) SC Freiburg | Vigo, Spain |
| 18:45 | Swedberg 90+1' | Report | Matanović 33'; Suzuki 39', 50' | Stadium: Balaídos; Attendance: 21,981; Referee: Anthony Taylor (England) |
