= Williot Swedberg =

Swedish footballer (born 2004)

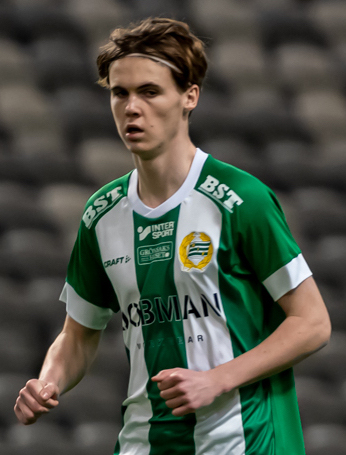
- Swedberg with Hammarby IF in 2021

Personal information
- Full name: Williot Theo Swedberg
- Date of birth: 1 February 2004 (age 22)
- Place of birth: Stockholm, Sweden
- Height: 1.85 m (6 ft 1 in)
- Positions: Left winger; attacking midfielder

Team information
- Current team: Celta
- Number: 19

Youth career
- –2011: Sickla IF
- 2011–2020: Hammarby IF

Senior career*
Years	Team	Apps	(Gls)
2020–2022	Hammarby IF	29	(7)
2020	→ IK Frej (loan)	16	(0)
2021	→ Hammarby TFF (res.)	11	(1)
2022–	Celta	92	(14)

International career^{‡}
2019–2020	Sweden U17	4	(1)
2021–2023	Sweden U19	18	(5)
2023–2025	Sweden U21	11	(2)
2024–	Sweden	3	(0)
- * Club domestic league appearances and goals as of 20:11, 21 November 2026 (UTC) ‡ National team caps and goals as of 22:10, 2 October 2026 (UTC)

Williot Theo Swedberg (born 1 February 2004) is a Swedish professional footballer who plays as a left winger or attacking midfielder for La Liga club Celta de Vigo and the Sweden national team.

== Early life ==
Born and primarily raised in Stockholm, Swedberg also partly lived in Valencia, Spain, during his childhood. He started to play youth football with local club Sickla IF. In 2011, at age seven, he joined the youth academy of Hammarby IF. In 2019, he went on trial with Premier League club Tottenham Hotspur.

== Club career ==
=== Hammarby IF ===
In 2020, Swedberg was sent on loan to Hammarby's affiliated club IK Frej in Ettan, the domestic third tier, where he made his debut in senior football. He began the 2021 season on loan at feeder team Hammarby TFF, also competing in Ettan.

On 11 July 2021, Swedberg made his competitive debut for Hammarby in Allsvenskan, in a 5–1 home win against Degerfors IF, coming on from the bench in the 79th minute and scoring two minutes later. After his debut, Swedberg reportedly attracted interest from Danish clubs Brøndby IF and FC Midtjylland. On 12 August, Swedberg signed a new three-year deal until 2024 with Hammarby, his first professional contract. He featured in five games as the side reached the play-off round of the 2021–22 UEFA Europa Conference League, after eliminating Maribor (4–1 on aggregate) and FK Čukarički (6–4 on aggregate, in which Swedberg scored). In the playoff, then, Hammarby was knocked out by Basel (4–4 on aggregate) after a penalty shoot-out. In October 2021, Swedberg was named as one of the 60 best young talents in world football born in 2004, by the English newspaper The Guardian.

On 23 February 2022, Swedberg was close to join Lokomotiv Moscow for a reported fee of around €4.5 million, but the deal ultimately fell through due to administrative reasons and the political instability following Russia's invasion of Ukraine. He had a strong start to the 2022 season, scoring five goals in the first five league fixtures, awarding him Allsvenskan Player of the Month in April. Swedberg featured in the final of the 2021–22 Svenska Cupen, in which Hammarby lost by 3–4 on penalties to Malmö FF after the game ended in a 0–0 draw.

=== Celta ===
On 17 June 2022, Swedberg transferred to Celta Vigo in La Liga, signing a contract until the summer of 2027. The fee was reportedly set at around €5 million, plus bonuses and a sell-on clause, making it a record breaking transfer for Hammarby.

His first goal for Celta de Vigo was against Almería; a late goal to win the match 3-2 on 2 September 2023.

Swedberg bagged a brace against Real Madrid in a 2–0 win at the Bernabéu in December 2025. He was named as the Best Under-23 Player in December.

== International career ==
Swedberg playing for Sweden U21 in 2023

Swedberg scored in his debut for the Sweden U17 national team in a 3–1 friendly win against Norway on 17 September 2019.

Swedberg made his debut for the Sweden national team on 8 June 2024, in a 0–3 friendly loss against Serbia at the Friends Arena. He came off the bench to replace Anthony Elanga in the 62nd minute.

== Style of play ==
A right-footed player with good technique, Swedberg is often deployed as an attacking central midfielder. He is a space operator and likes to get into the vacated spaces and make movements off-the-ball, much like Thomas Müller and Donny van de Beek. Known for his first touch and vision, Swedberg tends to often pass or carry the ball into the penalty area.

== Personal life ==
Swedberg is the son of the former professional footballers Hans Eskilsson and Malin Swedberg. Due to partially growing up in Valencia, Swedberg became trilingual from an early age. After his move to Celta in 2022, he said that his Spanish fluency surprised 'many' around the club.

== Career statistics ==
=== Club ===
As of match played 21 November 2026

Appearances and goals by club, season and competition
Club	Season	League			National cup (Note: Includes Svenska Cupen, Copa del Rey)		Europe		Total	
Club	Season	Division	Apps	Goals	Apps	Goals	Apps	Goals	Apps	Goals
IK Frej (loan)	2020	Ettan	16	0	0	0	—		16	0
Hammarby Talang FF (loan)	2021	Ettan	11	1	0	0	—		11	1
Hammarby IF	2021	Allsvenskan	19	2	1	0	5 (Note: Appearances in UEFA Europa Conference League)	1	25	3
Hammarby IF	2022	Allsvenskan	10	5	6	0	—		16	5
Hammarby IF	Total		29	7	7	0	5	1	41	8
Celta Vigo	2022–23	La Liga	4	0	3	0	—		7	0
Celta Vigo	2023–24	La Liga	15	5	5	0	—		20	5
Celta Vigo	2024–25	La Liga	32	4	3	1	—		35	5
Celta Vigo	2025–26	La Liga	29	5	2	0	10 (Note: Appearances in UEFA Europa League)	5	41	10
Celta Vigo	2026–27	La Liga	12	0	1	2	4	0	17	2
Celta Vigo	Total		92	14	14	3	14	5	120	22
Career total			148	22	21	3	19	6	188	31

=== International ===
As of match played 2 October 2026

Appearances and goals by national team and year
National team	Year	Apps	Goals
Sweden	2024	1	0
Sweden	2025	0	0
Sweden	2026	2	0
Total		3	0

== Honours ==
Individual

- La Liga U23 Player of the Month: December 2025
