= Marcos Alonso (footballer, born 1990) =

Spanish footballer (born 1990)

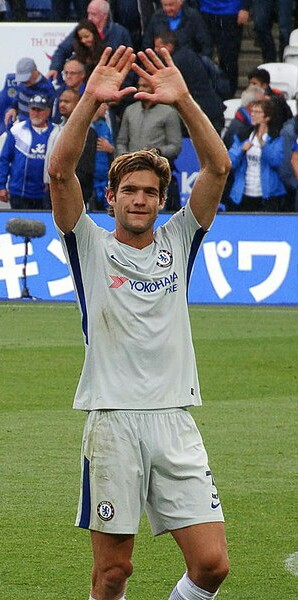
- Alonso with Chelsea in 2017

Personal information
- Full name: Marcos Alonso Mendoza
- Date of birth: 28 December 1990 (age 35)
- Place of birth: Madrid, Spain
- Height: 1.88 m (6 ft 2 in)
- Position: Defender

Team information
- Current team: Celta
- Number: 3

Youth career
- Alcobendas
- Unión Adarve
- 2002–2008: Real Madrid

Senior career*
Years	Team	Apps	(Gls)
2008–2010	Real Madrid B	39	(3)
2010	Real Madrid	1	(0)
2010–2013	Bolton Wanderers	35	(5)
2013–2016	Fiorentina	58	(4)
2014	→ Sunderland (loan)	16	(0)
2016–2022	Chelsea	154	(25)
2022–2024	Barcelona	29	(1)
2024–	Celta	73	(4)

International career
2009	Spain U19	3	(0)
2018–2022	Spain	9	(0)
Medal record
Men's football
Representing Spain
UEFA Nations League
Runner-up	2021 Italy
- * Club domestic league appearances and goals as of 20:59, 21 November 2026 (UTC)

Marcos Alonso Mendoza (born 28 December 1990) is a Spanish professional footballer who plays either as a left-back or centre-back for La Liga club Celta de Vigo.

He started his career at Real Madrid but went on to make his name with Bolton Wanderers in England and later with Fiorentina in Italy. His success at the latter club led Chelsea to sign him for an estimated £24 million in 2016, going on to win multiple honours including the Premier League in the 2016–17 season and the UEFA Champions League in 2021. He returned to his country in summer 2022, winning La Liga in 2022–23 with Barcelona.

Alonso made his full debut for Spain in March 2018. He went on to earn nine caps in four years.

== Club career ==
=== Real Madrid ===
Alonso was born in Madrid. He started his career at Alcobendas and Unión Adarve, also having an unsuccessful trial at Atlético Madrid.

Aged 11, Alonso joined Real Madrid's youth academy, going on to represent every youth side the following years. In 2008, he reached Real Madrid Castilla which competed in the Segunda División B, and first appeared for the reserve team on 22 February 2009, playing the entire 1–0 home loss against Alcorcón.

On 11 December 2009, Alonso was first summoned by the main squad – coached by Manuel Pellegrini – for a La Liga match at Valencia. Eventually, he did not make the final list of 18, and his debut arrived on 4 April of the following year as he came on as a substitute for Gonzalo Higuaín in the 90th minute of a 2–0 away win over Racing de Santander.

=== Bolton Wanderers ===
Alonso joined Bolton Wanderers of the Premier League for an undisclosed fee, on 27 July 2010. He made his competitive debut for the club in a 1–0 away win against Southampton in the League Cup on 24 August. His first league appearance arrived on 1 January 2011, starting for suspended Paul Robinson in a 2–1 away loss to Liverpool at Anfield.

Alonso scored his first goal for Bolton on 31 March 2012, the second of an eventual 3–2 away victory over Wolverhampton Wanderers. At the end of the 2012–13 season, he was voted The Bolton News' player of the year, winning 37% of the vote: Marc Iles wrote, "...this has been a break-out season for the former Real Madrid starlet. Alonso has grown in stature and become a consistent performer at full-back – chipping in with some important goals too."

=== Fiorentina ===
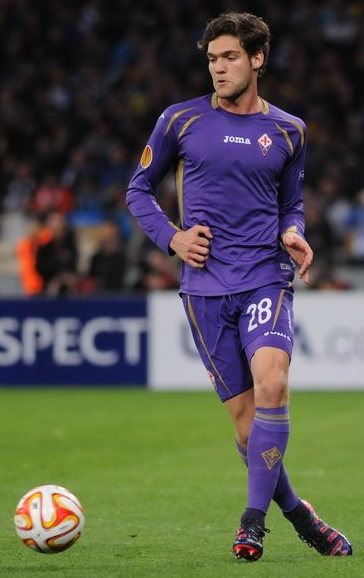
Alonso playing for Fiorentina in a Europa League match against Dynamo Kyiv in 2015

In May 2013, Alonso signed for Italian side Fiorentina on a three-year deal, despite being offered a new contract by Bolton manager Dougie Freedman. As he was under the age of 23 when leaving, the former were forced to pay the latter £400,000 in compensation.

On 30 December 2013, Sunderland boss Gus Poyet announced that Alonso would join on 1 January 2014, on loan until the end of the campaign. He played his first match on 7 January 2014, featuring the full 90 minutes in a 2–1 home win over Manchester United in the League Cup semi-final first leg and being given the Player of the match award by Sky Sports. He took part in the final of the competition on 2 March, not being able to prevent a 3–1 loss against Manchester City; he contributed 20 appearances in all competitions, helping his team to retain their top-flight status.

Upon his return from loan, Alonso became a regular, making over 70 appearances in his final two seasons in purple. On 19 March 2015, he scored his first goal for the Viola, in a 3–0 defeat of fellow Italians Roma in the round of 16 of the UEFA Europa League.

=== Chelsea ===
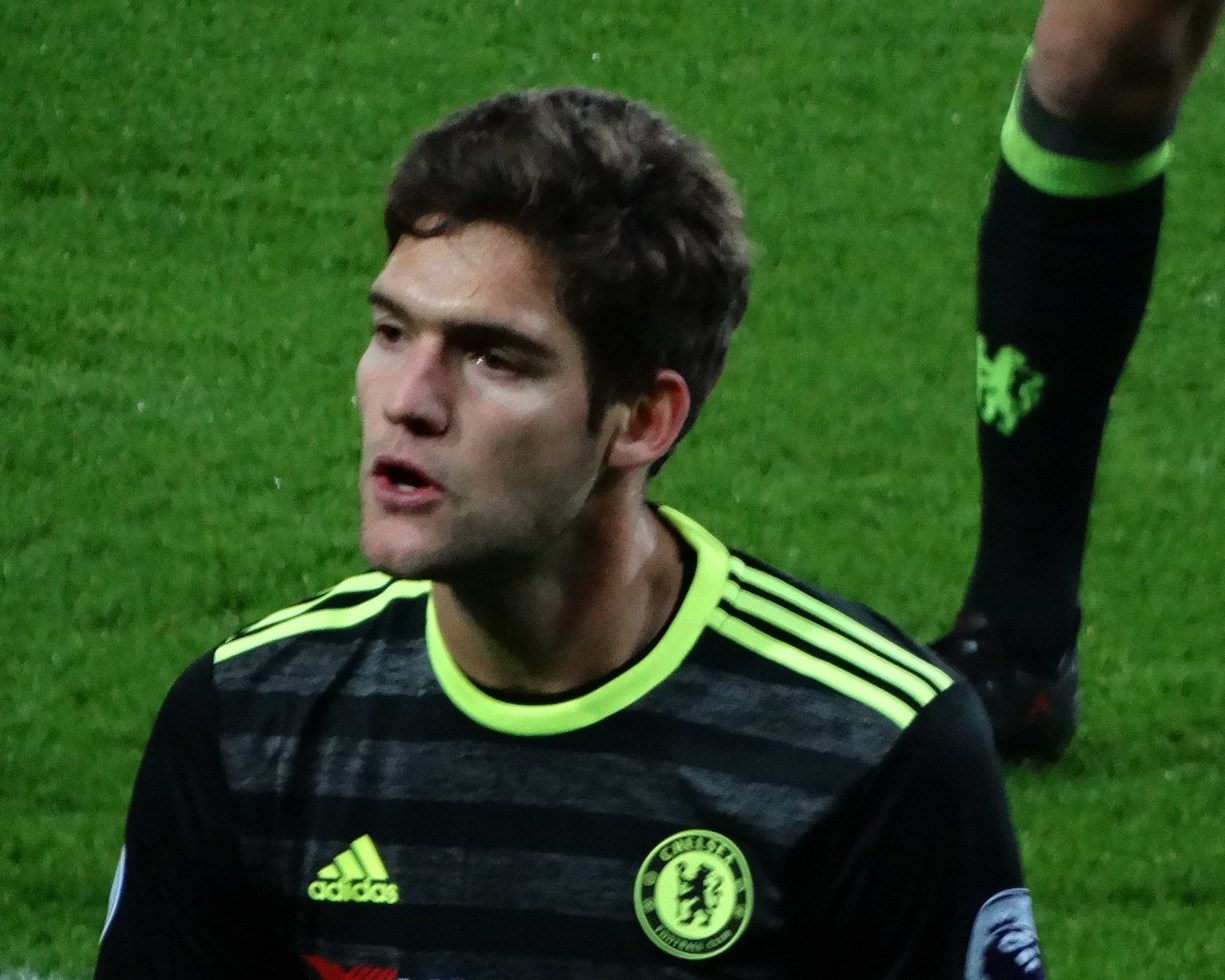
Alonso playing for Chelsea in 2017

On 30 August 2016, after 85 games with Fiorentina, Alonso completed his move back to England after signing a five-year contract with Chelsea worth around £24 million. He made his debut on 20 September, featuring 120 minutes in the 4–2 win at Leicester City in the League Cup third round, and four days later he first appeared in the league in a 3–0 away defeat to Arsenal, coming off the bench for Cesc Fàbregas in the 55th minute.

Alonso scored his first goal for the club on 5 November 2016, in a 5–0 victory over Everton at Stamford Bridge. He added two more at the King Power Stadium, in a 3–0 win against Leicester on 14 January 2017; he eventually totalled six goals for the league champions.

In April 2018, Alonso came under extensive criticism for seemingly purposely digging the studs of his boots into Shane Long's leg during a tackle in a league game against Southampton. He was not reprimanded in any way by referee Mike Dean – who came under similar criticism – but was later charged with violent conduct by The Football Association, and later issued a three-match ban. He scored a career-best seven league goals during the campaign, eight in all competitions, adding his only FA Cup by beating Manchester United 1–0.

Alonso scored his first goal of 2020–21 on 31 January 2021, scoring the second in a 2–0 home win over Burnley and helping new head coach Thomas Tuchel to his first victory. On 8 May, he netted the winner as his team defeated Manchester City 2–1 at the Etihad Stadium. He was an unused substitute in the final of the UEFA Champions League in Porto against the same opposition (1–0 victory), but started and finished both legs of the round of 16 tie against Atlético Madrid.

Alonso scored Chelsea's opening goal of the following season, from a free kick in the 3–0 home win over Crystal Palace. He captained the club for the first time on 11 September 2021, in a league fixture at home to Aston Villa.

In his six-year spell, Alonso made 212 appearances, scored 29 goals and provided 23 assists.

=== Barcelona ===
On 2 September 2022, Alonso agreed to a one-year contract at Barcelona after leaving Chelsea by mutual consent a day earlier. He scored his only Champions League goal on 1 November, opening the 4–2 away win over Viktoria Plzeň in the group stage.

In March 2023, Alonso's former sides Unión Adarve and Bolton Wanderers questioned the legality of the transfer and lodged complaints to FIFA over it; they alleged that they were due compensation, stating entitlement as he was on their books before the age of 23. He made 24 appearances for the eventual league champions (37 overall), scoring his only goal on New Year's Eve in the 1–1 home draw with Espanyol in the Derbi Barceloní.

=== Celta ===
Alonso signed an initial one-year deal with Celta de Vigo on 28 August 2024, as a free agent. He finished his debut campaign with four goals, three in the league for the seventh-placed side.

== International career ==
On 16 March 2018, Alonso received his first call-up for the Spain national team for friendlies against Germany and Argentina later that month. He debuted against the latter on the 27th in a 6–1 win at the Wanda Metropolitano where he replaced Jordi Alba with 11 minutes left, making the Alonsos the first Spanish family to have three generations of internationals and seventh worldwide.

== Personal life ==
Alonso's grandfather, Marcos Alonso Imaz (better known as Marquitos), played with Real Madrid's first team for eight years. His father, Marcos Alonso Peña, spent several seasons in Spain's top flight, most notably with Atlético Madrid and Barcelona, and both represented Spain at senior level.

=== Drunk driving incident ===
On 3 May 2011, Alonso was the driver in an accident causing the death of a young woman in Madrid. He was the driver of a car that collided with a wall, killing one of the passengers, a 22-year-old woman, having been driving at 112.8 km/h (70.1 mph) in wet conditions in a 50 km/h (30 mph) zone, with a blood alcohol content of 0.93 mg/mL of blood. He faced 21 months in prison when sentenced in February 2016, but his punishment was changed to a €61,000 fine and a driving ban of three years and four months, which had already been spent.

== Career statistics ==
=== Club ===
As of match played 21 November 2026

Appearances and goals by club, season and competition
Club	Season	League			National cup (Note: Includes FA Cup, Coppa Italia, Copa del Rey)		League cup (Note: Includes Football League Cup/EFL Cup)		Europe		Other		Total	
Club	Season	Division	Apps	Goals	Apps	Goals	Apps	Goals	Apps	Goals	Apps	Goals	Apps	Goals
Real Madrid B	2008–09	Segunda División B	11	0	—		—		—		—		11	0
Real Madrid B	2009–10	Segunda División B	28	3	—		—		—		—		28	3
Real Madrid B	Total		39	3	—		—		—		—		39	3
Real Madrid	2009–10	La Liga	1	0	0	0	—		0	0	0	0	1	0
Bolton Wanderers	2010–11	Premier League	4	0	3	0	2	0	—		—		9	0
Bolton Wanderers	2011–12	Premier League	5	1	1	0	1	0	—		—		7	1
Bolton Wanderers	2012–13	Championship	26	4	3	0	1	0	—		—		30	4
Bolton Wanderers	Total		35	5	7	0	4	0	—		—		46	5
Fiorentina	2013–14	Serie A	3	0	0	0	—		6 (Note: Appearances in UEFA Europa League)	0	—		9	0
Fiorentina	2014–15	Serie A	22	1	3	0	—		10	1	—		35	2
Fiorentina	2015–16	Serie A	31	3	1	0	—		7	0	—		39	3
Fiorentina	2016–17	Serie A	2	0	0	0	—		0	0	—		2	0
Fiorentina	Total		58	4	4	0	—		23	1	—		85	5
Sunderland (loan)	2013–14	Premier League	16	0	1	0	3	0	—		—		20	0
Chelsea	2016–17	Premier League	31	6	3	0	1	0	—		—		35	6
Chelsea	2017–18	Premier League	33	7	3	1	2	0	7 (Note: Appearances in UEFA Champions League)	0	1 (Note: Appearance in FA Community Shield)	0	46	8
Chelsea	2018–19	Premier League	31	2	2	0	1	0	4	2	1	0	39	4
Chelsea	2019–20	Premier League	18	4	4	0	2	0	5	0	0	0	29	4
Chelsea	2020–21	Premier League	13	2	2	0	0	0	2	0	—		17	2
Chelsea	2021–22	Premier League	28	4	3	1	5	0	8	0	2 (Note: One appearance in UEFA Super Cup, one appearance in FIFA Club World Cup)	0	46	5
Chelsea	Total		154	25	17	2	11	0	26	2	4	0	212	29
Barcelona	2022–23	La Liga	24	1	5	0	—		7 (Note: Five appearances and one goal in UEFA Champions League, two appearances and one goal in UEFA Europa League)	2	1 (Note: Appearance in Supercopa de España)	0	37	3
Barcelona	2023–24	La Liga	5	0	0	0	—		3	0	0	0	8	0
Barcelona	Total		29	1	5	0	—		10	2	1	0	45	3
Celta	2024–25	La Liga	31	3	2	1	—		—		—		33	4
Celta	2025–26	La Liga	32	1	0	0	—		11	0	—		43	1
Celta	2026–27	La Liga	10	0	0	0	—		4	0	—		14	0
Celta	Total		73	4	2	1	—		15	0	—		90	5
Career total			405	42	36	3	18	0	74	5	5	0	538	50

=== International ===
Appearances and goals by national team and year
National team	Year	Apps	Goals
Spain	2018	3	0
Spain	2019	0	0
Spain	2020	0	0
Spain	2021	2	0
Spain	2022	4	0
Total		9	0

== Honours ==
Sunderland

- Football League Cup runner-up: 2013–14

Chelsea

- Premier League: 2016–17
- FA Cup: 2017–18; runner-up: 2016–17, 2019–20, 2020–21, 2021–22
- UEFA Champions League: 2020–21
- UEFA Europa League: 2018–19
- UEFA Super Cup: 2021
- FIFA Club World Cup: 2021
- EFL Cup runner-up: 2018–19, 2021–22

Barcelona

- La Liga: 2022–23
- Supercopa de España: 2023

Spain

- UEFA Nations League runner-up: 2020–21

Individual

- PFA Team of the Year: 2017–18 Premier League
