= Javi Rodríguez (footballer) =

Spanish footballer

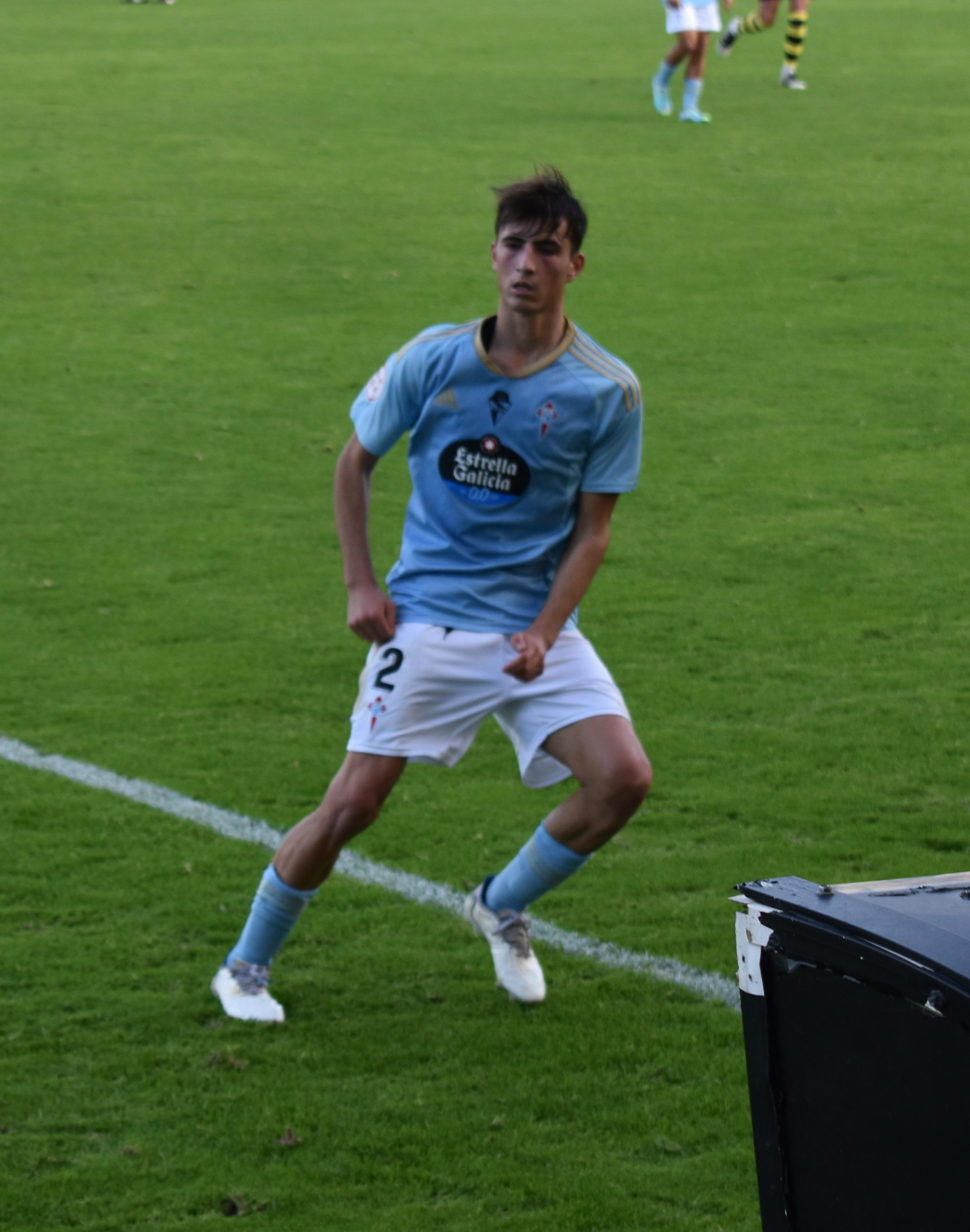
- Rodríguez in 2022

Personal information
- Full name: Javier Rodríguez Galiano
- Date of birth: 26 June 2003 (age 23)
- Place of birth: Poio, Spain
- Height: 1.78 m (5 ft 10 in)
- Position: Right-back

Team information
- Current team: Celta
- Number: 20

Youth career
- Marcón Atlético
- 2011–2022: Celta

Senior career*
Years	Team	Apps	(Gls)
2022–2023	Celta C	12	(2)
2022–2024	Celta B	46	(6)
2023–	Celta	74	(4)

International career^{‡}
2026–	Spain	1	(0)
- * Club domestic league appearances and goals as of 20:40, 21 October 2026 (UTC) ‡ National team caps and goals as of 4 June 2026

Javier "Liam" Rodríguez Galiano (born 26 June 2003) is a Spanish professional footballer who plays for La Liga club Celta de Vigo and the Spain national team. Mainly a right-back, he can also play as a centre-back.

== Career ==
Born in Poio, Pontevedra, Galicia, Rodríguez joined RC Celta de Vigo's youth setup from local side Marcón Atlético. He made his senior debut with the C-team on 11 September 2022, starting in a 2–2 Tercera Federación home draw against Atlético Arteixo, and scored his first goal seven days later by netting his side's second in a 6–2 home routing of CD Choco.

After being a regular starter at the C's, Rodríguez started to feature with the reserves in Primera Federación in the second half of the 2022–23 season. In July 2023, he was definitely promoted to the B-team.

Rodríguez made his first team debut on 1 November 2023, coming on as a late substitute for fellow youth graduate Carlos Domínguez in a 4–0 away routing of Turégano CF, for the campaign's Copa del Rey. He made his professional debut the following 7 January, replacing Kevin Vázquez late into a 4–2 win at SD Amorebieta, also for the national cup.

== Career statistics ==
=== Club ===
As of match played 22 October 2026

Appearances and goals by club, season and competition
Club	Season	League			Copa del Rey		Other		Total	
Club	Season	Division	Apps	Goals	Apps	Goals	Apps	Goals	Apps	Goals
Celta B	2022–23	Primera Federación	12	3	—		0	0	12	3
Celta B	2023–24	Primera Federación	34	3	—		2	0	36	3
Celta B	Total		46	6	—		2	0	48	6
Celta	2023–24	La Liga	0	0	2	0	—		2	0
Celta	2024–25	La Liga	36	3	4	0	—		40	3
Celta	2025–26	La Liga	33	0	1	0	12 (Note: Appearances in UEFA Europa League)	0	46	0
Celta	2026–27	La Liga	5	1	0	0	3	2	8	3
Celta	Total		74	4	7	0	15	2	96	6
Career total			120	10	7	0	17	2	144	12

=== International ===
As of match played 4 June 2026

Appearances and goals by national team and year
National team	Year	Apps	Goals
Spain	2026	1	0
Total		1	0
