= Yoel Lago =

Spanish footballer

Personal information
- Full name: Yoel Lago Amil
- Date of birth: 25 March 2004 (age 22)
- Place of birth: Mondariz, Spain
- Height: 1.85 m (6 ft 1 in)
- Positions: Centre-back; midfielder

Team information
- Current team: Celta
- Number: 18

Youth career
- Mondariz
- 2013–2016: Porriño Industrial
- 2016–2023: Celta

Senior career*
Years	Team	Apps	(Gls)
2021–2025	Celta B	79	(0)
2024–	Celta	24	(0)
- * Club domestic league appearances and goals as of 30 August 2026

Yoel Lago Amil (born 25 March 2004) is a Spanish professional footballer who plays as either a centre-back or a midfielder for RC Celta de Vigo.

== Career ==
Born in Mondariz, Pontevedra, Galicia, Lago joined RC Celta de Vigo's youth sides in 2016, after representing Porriño Industrial FC and Mondariz FC. He made his senior debut with the reserves on 25 September 2021, coming on as a late substitute for Fernando Medrano in a 1–0 Primera División RFEF away loss to CD Calahorra.

In 2023, after finishing his formation, Lago was initially assigned to the C-team in Tercera Federación, but never featured for the side after establishing himself as a regular for the B-team during the pre-season. He made his first team – and La Liga – debut on 26 May 2024, starting in a 2–2 home draw against Valencia CF.

On 1 September 2026, Lago was definitely promoted to the main squad, being assigned the number 18 jersey.

== Career statistics ==
As of match played 23 May 2026

Appearances and goals by club, season and competition
Club	Season	League			Cup		Europe		Other		Total	
Club	Season	Division	Apps	Goals	Apps	Goals	Apps	Goals	Apps	Goals	Apps	Goals
Celta B	2021–22	Primera Federación	3	0	—		—		—		3	0
Celta B	2022–23	Primera Federación	16	0	—		—		0	0	16	0
Celta B	2023–24	Primera Federación	31	0	—		—		2 (Note: Appearances in 2024 Primera Federación play-offs)	0	33	0
Celta B	2024–25	Primera Federación	29	0	—		—		—		29	0
Celta B	Total		79	0	—		—		2	0	81	0
Celta	2023–24	La Liga	1	0	—		—		—		1	0
Celta	2024–25	La Liga	8	0	2	0	—		—		10	0
Celta	2025–26	La Liga	12	0	3	1	4 (Note: Appearances in UEFA Europa League)	0	—		19	1
Celta	Total		21	0	5	1	4	0	—		30	1
Career total			100	0	5	1	4	0	2	0	111	1
