= Ilaix Moriba =

Guinean footballer (born 2003)

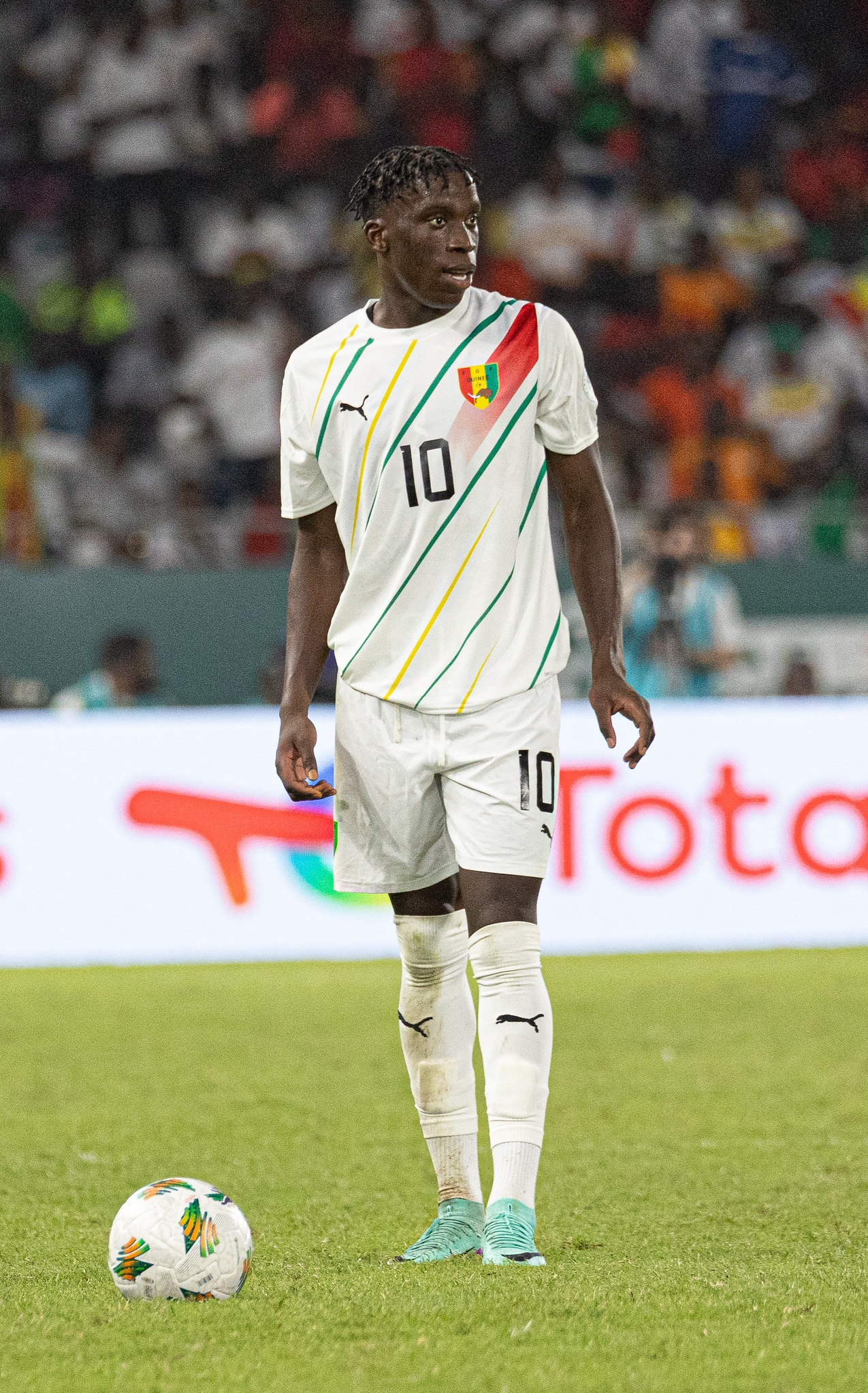
- Moriba playing for Guinea at the 2023 Africa Cup of Nations

Personal information
- Full name: Moriba Kourouma Kourouma
- Date of birth: 19 January 2003 (age 23)
- Place of birth: Conakry, Guinea
- Height: 1.85 m (6 ft 1 in)
- Position: Central midfielder

Team information
- Current team: Celta
- Number: 6

Youth career
- 2008–2010: Espanyol
- 2010–2019: Barcelona

Senior career*
| Years | Team | Apps | (Gls) |
| 2019–2021 | Barcelona B | 19 | (2) |
| 2021 | Barcelona | 14 | (1) |
| 2021–2025 | RB Leipzig | 2 | (0) |
| 2021–2023 | → Valencia (loan) | 38 | (0) |
| 2024 | → Getafe (loan) | 14 | (0) |
| 2024–2025 | → Celta (loan) | 33 | (1) |
| 2025– | Celta | 49 | (3) |

International career^{‡}
| 2019 | Spain U17 | 8 | (2) |
| 2019 | Spain U18 | 2 | (0) |
| 2024– | Guinea Olympic | 4 | (1) |
| 2022– | Guinea | 25 | (1) |
- * Club domestic league appearances and goals as of 20:35, 22 November 2026 (UTC) ‡ National team caps and goals as of 23:23, 10 September 2024 (UTC)

Moriba Kourouma Kourouma (born 19 January 2003), known as Ilaix Moriba (Catalan: [iˈlaʃ muˈɾiβə]), is a Guinean professional footballer who plays as a central midfielder for La Liga club Celta de Vigo and the Guinea national team.

== Early life ==
Moriba was born in Conakry, Guinea, to a Guinean mother and a Liberian Krahn father. He holds both Spanish and Guinean citizenship.

== Club career ==
=== Barcelona ===
Moriba arrived at Barcelona from Espanyol in 2010. As a youth player he was considered one of the best young players in the world, and he has very often played in categories of players far older than him. Moriba really stood out at age 15 when he scored a hat-trick against the Real Madrid U19. The most remarkable feat was his last goal, where he scored from the middle of the pitch at the start of the second half.

In January 2019, as his youth contract was about to expire, clubs such as Manchester City tried to sign him.

The following season he became a regular for Barça B. He scored his first goal on 8 March 2020, the winner in a 3–2 victory against Llagostera.

During the 2020–21 season, Moriba was included in the first team squad for the first time for a La Liga match against Granada. He was an unused substitute in a 4–0 away win. Moriba would later make his first team debut – and as a starter – on 21 January against Cornellà in the round of 32 of the Copa del Rey. He was replaced by Sergio Busquets in the 74th minute of a 2–0 win. On 13 February 2021, he made his La Liga debut in a 5–1 win over Alavés, in which he also provided an assist for Francisco Trincão. He scored his first La Liga goal in a 2–0 away win against Osasuna on 6 March 2021, to become the fifth youngest scorer in club's history, topped only by Ansu Fati, Bojan Krkić, Lionel Messi and Pedri.

On 10 March 2021, Moriba made his UEFA Champions League debut in a 1–1 draw against Paris Saint-Germain in the round of 16, coming on as a substitute for Sergio Busquets in the 79th minute.

=== RB Leipzig ===
On 31 August 2021, Moriba joined Bundesliga side RB Leipzig for a fee of €16 million and €6 million additional in variables. Barcelona also reserved the right to 10% of any future sale.

==== Loan to Valencia ====
On 28 January 2022, La Liga club Valencia announced the signing of Moriba, on a loan until the end of the season. Moriba returned for a second loan for the 2022–23 season.

==== Loan to Getafe ====
On 8 January 2024, after Moriba had made no appearances for RB Leipzig during the first half of the 2023–24 season, he returned to La Liga, on loan to Getafe until the end of the season. Moriba made his debut for Getafe on 11 February against Celta which resulted in a 3–2 victory.

==== Loan to Celta ====
On 7 August 2024, Moriba returned to La Liga once again, joining Celta on loan with an option to buy.

=== Celta Vigo ===
On 16 June 2025, Moriba joined La Liga club Celta.

== International career ==
=== Youth career ===
Moriba is a former youth international with Spain, but he is also eligible for both Guinea and Liberia. He eventually chose to play for the Guinea national team, being set to make his debut on the international stage in June 2020, before the COVID-19 pandemic froze the 2020 football season.

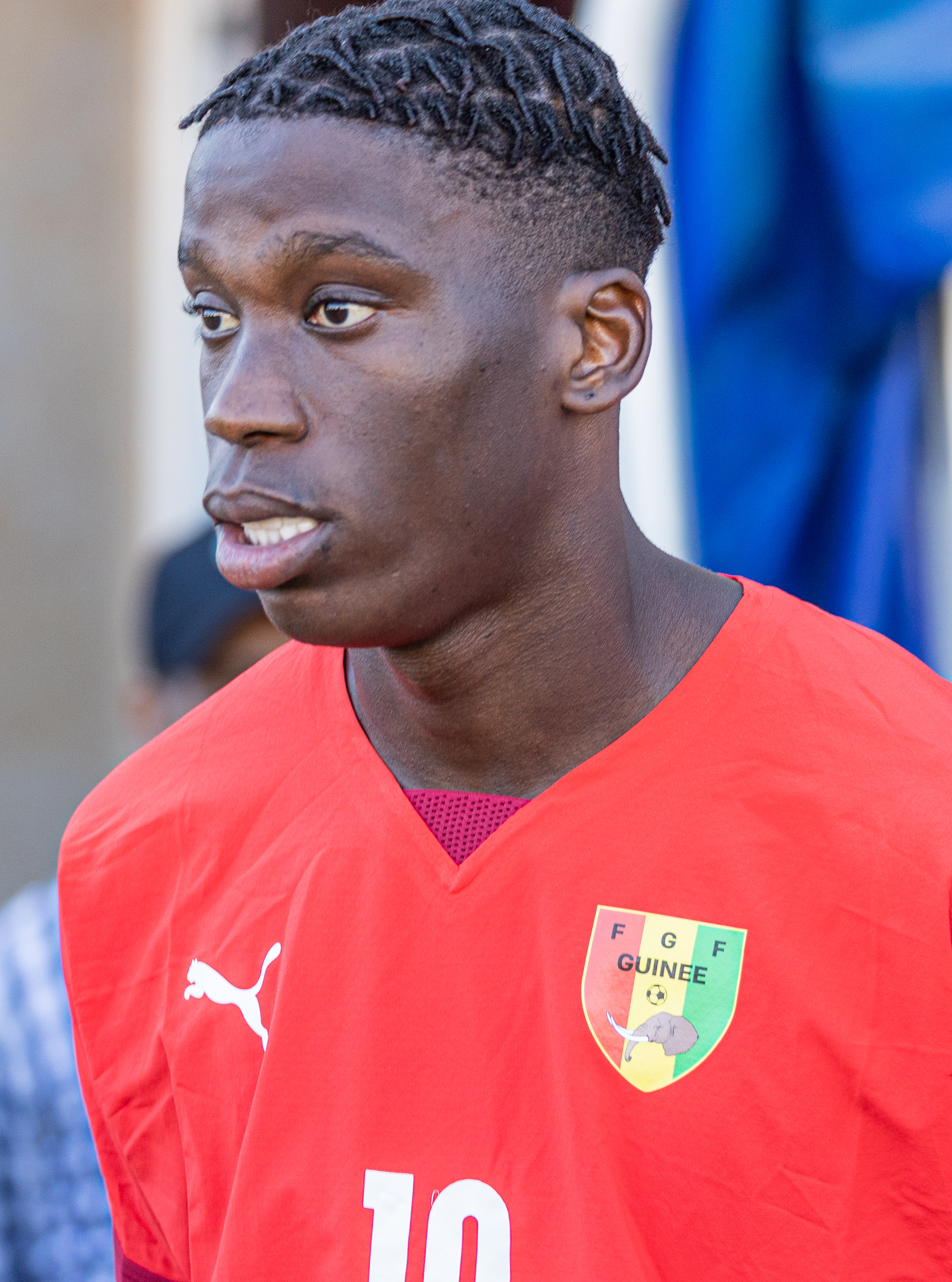
Moriba with Guinea national team in 2023

=== Guinea ===
On 21 August 2021, Moriba officially chose to change international allegiances from Spain and chose to play with the Guinea national team. On 27 December 2021, he was included in Guinea's extended 2021 Africa Cup of Nations squad. On 3 January 2022, Moriba debuted with Guinea in a 3–0 friendly loss to Rwanda. In December 2023, he was named in the Guinean squad for the 2023 Africa Cup of Nations in Ivory Coast.

On 9 May 2024, Moriba scored a penalty for Guinea U23 in a 1–0 win over Indonesia during the 2024 Summer Olympic's qualification play-off, which qualified his nation to the Summer Olympics for the first time since 1968.

== Style of play ==
Moriba, noted for his robust physique, is celebrated for his agility and resolve, both in possession of the ball and when tracking back. His technical skills are complemented by a profound comprehension of the game's dynamics and his powerful shooting ability. Observers often draw parallels between Moriba's style of play and that of Yaya Touré, a former footballer for Blaugrana known for his midfield dominance. Moriba himself has acknowledged being inspired by football legends, including Sergio Busquets and Juan Román Riquelme, as well as other prominent figures associated with Barcelona.

Developed at La Masia, Barcelona's famed youth academy, Moriba's playing style does not wholly conform to the typical profile of a Barcelona academy midfielder, often characterized by a deep-lying playmaker role epitomized by Xavi. While Moriba aspires to excel in the number 6 role, his early notable performances came as a central midfielder in a 4-3-3 formation. In this role, Moriba functioned as a box-to-box midfielder, undertaking both defensive responsibilities and contributing to offensive plays.

Moriba has garnered attention for his long range goals. He has also been a provider, delivering crucial assists, a trait evident since his days in the youth ranks.

== Career statistics ==
=== Club ===
As of match played 21 November 2026

Appearances and goals by club, season and competition
| Club | Season | League | | | National cup | | Europe | | Other | | Total | |
| Club | Season | Division | Apps | Goals | Apps | Goals | Apps | Goals | Apps | Goals | Apps | Goals |
|---|---|---|---|---|---|---|---|---|---|---|---|---|
| Barcelona B | 2019–20 | Segunda División B | 8 | 1 | — | | — | | 3 (Note: Appearance(s) in Segunda División B play-offs) | 0 | 11 | 1 |
| Barcelona B | 2020–21 | Segunda División B | 11 | 1 | — | | — | | 0 | 0 | 11 | 1 |
| Barcelona B | Total | | 19 | 2 | — | | — | | 3 | 0 | 22 | 2 |
| Barcelona | 2020–21 | La Liga | 14 | 1 | 3 | 0 | 1 (Note: Appearance(s) in UEFA Champions League) | 0 | 0 | 0 | 18 | 1 |
| RB Leipzig | 2021–22 | Bundesliga | 2 | 0 | 1 | 0 | 3 | 0 | — | | 6 | 0 |
| Valencia (loan) | 2021–22 | La Liga | 14 | 0 | 4 | 0 | — | | — | | 18 | 0 |
| Valencia (loan) | 2022–23 | La Liga | 24 | 0 | 3 | 1 | — | | 1 (Note: Appearance(s) in Supercopa de España) | 0 | 28 | 1 |
| Valencia (loan) | Total | | 38 | 0 | 7 | 1 | — | | 1 | 0 | 46 | 1 |
| Getafe (loan) | 2023–24 | La Liga | 14 | 0 | 0 | 0 | — | | — | | 14 | 0 |
| Celta Vigo (loan) | 2024–25 | La Liga | 33 | 1 | 2 | 0 | — | | — | | 35 | 1 |
| Celta Vigo | 2025–26 | La Liga | 36 | 2 | 1 | 0 | 11 (Note: Appearances in UEFA Europa League) | 0 | — | | 48 | 2 |
| Celta Vigo | 2026–27 | La Liga | 13 | 1 | 0 | 0 | 3 | 0 | — | | 16 | 1 |
| Celta Vigo | Celta Vigo total | | 82 | 4 | 3 | 0 | 14 | 0 | — | | 99 | 4 |
| Career total | | | 169 | 7 | 14 | 1 | 18 | 0 | 4 | 0 | 205 | 8 |

=== International ===
As of match played 10 September 2024

Appearances and goals by national team and year
| National team | Year | Apps | Goals |
|---|---|---|---|
| Guinea | 2022 | 10 | 0 |
| Guinea | 2023 | 9 | 1 |
| Guinea | 2024 | 6 | 0 |
| Total | | 25 | 1 |

Scores and results list Guinea's goal tally first, score column indicates score after each Moriba goal.

List of international goals scored by Ilaix Moriba
| No. | Date | Venue | Opponent | Score | Result | Competition |
|---|---|---|---|---|---|---|
| 1 | 27 March 2023 | Prince Moulay Abdellah Stadium, Rabat, Morocco | Ethiopia | 2–1 | 3–2 | 2023 Africa Cup of Nations qualification |

== Honours ==
Barcelona

- Copa del Rey: 2020–21
