= Sergio Carreira =

Spanish footballer (born 2000)

Personal information
- Full name: Sergio Carreira Vilariño
- Date of birth: 13 October 2000 (age 26)
- Place of birth: Vigo, Spain
- Height: 1.70 m (5 ft 7 in)
- Position: Right-back

Team information
- Current team: Celta
- Number: 5

Youth career
- Coruxo
- 2012–2019: Celta

Senior career*
Years	Team	Apps	(Gls)
2018–2021	Celta B	57	(0)
2020–	Celta	60	(3)
2021–2022	→ Mirandés (loan)	38	(1)
2022–2023	→ Villarreal B (loan)	31	(2)
2023–2024	→ Elche (loan)	20	(0)

International career^{‡}
2021	Spain U21	4	(0)
- * Club domestic league appearances and goals as of 27 May 2026 ‡ National team caps and goals as of 12 November 2021

Sergio Carreira Vilariño (born 13 October 2000) is a Spanish professional footballer who plays as a right-back for La Liga club Celta de Vigo.

== Club career ==
Carreira was born in Vigo, Galicia, and joined RC Celta de Vigo's youth setup in 2012, from Coruxo FC; a forward, he was converted into a right back during his formation. He made his senior debut with the reserves on 25 November 2018, coming on as a second-half substitute for Jacobo in a 0–2 Segunda División B away loss against Internacional de Madrid.

Carreira made his first team – and La Liga – debut on 17 October 2020, starting in a 0–2 home loss against Atlético Madrid. He scored his first goal in the category nine days later, netting the equalizer in a 1–1 away draw against Levante UD.

On 20 July 2021, Carreira renewed his contract with the Celestes until 2025, and was loaned to Segunda División side CD Mirandés for the season. On 6 August of the following year, he moved to fellow league team Villarreal CF B also in a temporary deal.

On 1 September 2023, Carreira joined second division side Elche CF on loan for the 2023–24 campaign.

== Career statistics ==
=== Club ===
As of match played 23 May 2026

Appearances and goals by club, season and competition
Club	Season	League			National Cup		Europe		Other		Total	
Club	Season	Division	Apps	Goals	Apps	Goals	Apps	Goals	Apps	Goals	Apps	Goals
Celta B	2017–18	Segunda División B	0	0	—		—		—		0	0
Celta B	2018–19	Segunda División B	14	0	—		—		2 (Note: Appearance(s) in Segunda División B Promotion)	0	16	0
Celta B	2019–20	Segunda División B	25	0	—		—		—		25	0
Celta B	2020–21	Segunda División B	12	0	—		—		7 (Note: Appearances in Segunda División B play-offs)	0	19	0
Celta B	Total		55	0	0	0	—		9	0	64	0
Celta	2019–20	La Liga	0	0	1	0	—		—		1	0
Celta	2020–21	La Liga	3	1	2	0	—		—		5	1
Celta	2024–25	La Liga	23	0	4	0	—		—		27	0
Celta	2025–26	La Liga	34	2	1	0	10 (Note: Appearances in UEFA Europa League)	0	—		45	2
Celta	Total		60	2	8	0	10	0	—		78	3
Mirandés (loan)	2021–22	Segunda División	38	1	2	0	—		—		40	1
Villarreal B (loan)	2022–23	Segunda División	31	2	—		—		—		31	2
Elche (loan)	2023–24	Segunda División	20	0	3	0	—		—		23	0
Career total			204	6	13	0	12	0	9	0	238	6
