= Hugo Burcio =

Spanish footballer (born 2006)

Personal information
- Full name: Hugo Burcio García
- Date of birth: 31 October 2006 (age 20)
- Place of birth: Galapagar, Spain
- Height: 1.87 m (6 ft 2 in)
- Position: Midfielder

Team information
- Current team: Celta B
- Number: 5

Youth career
- 2011–2013: Seseña
- 2013–2018: Real Madrid
- 2018–2020: Rayo Vallecano
- 2020–2024: Celta

Senior career*
Years	Team	Apps	(Gls)
2024–	Celta B	58	(1)
2025–	Celta	1	(0)

International career
2025–	Spain U19	1	(0)
- * Club domestic league appearances and goals as of 15 August 2026

Hugo Burcio García (born 31 October 2006) is a Spanish professional footballer who plays as a midfielder for RC Celta Fortuna.

== Club career ==
Born in Galapagar, Community of Madrid, Burcio played for Seseña CF before joining Real Madrid's La Fábrica in 2013, but left the latter in 2018 and joined RC Celta de Vigo in 2020 after two years at Rayo Vallecano. He made his senior debut with the reserves on 1 September 2024, starting in a 3–2 Primera Federación away loss to Real Unión.

Burcio subsequently established himself as a starter for the B-team, and made his professional – and La Liga – debut on 18 January 2026, coming on as a late substitute for Carl Starfelt in a 3–0 home win over former side Rayo.

== International career ==
On 9 January 2025, Burcio was called up to the Spain national under-19 team.
