= Manu Fernández (footballer, born 2001) =

Spanish footballer

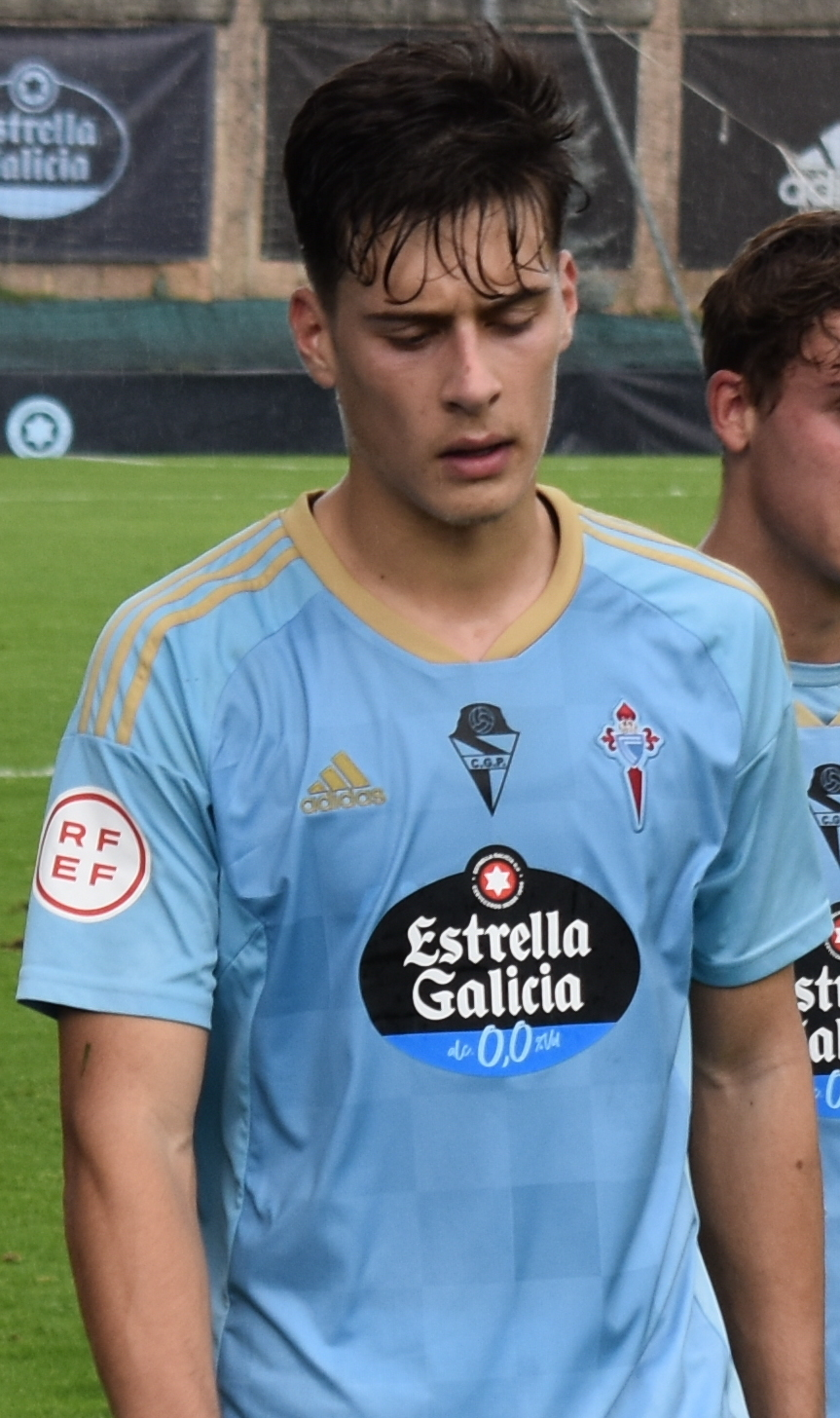
- Fernández with Celta C in 2022

Personal information
- Full name: Manuel Fernández Arroyo
- Date of birth: 23 April 2001 (age 25)
- Place of birth: Narón, Spain
- Height: 1.85 m (6 ft 1 in)
- Position: Centre-back

Team information
- Current team: Cádiz
- Number: 6

Youth career
- Racing Ferrol
- Narón
- Racing Ferrol
- 2016–2019: Celta
- 2018–2019: → Racing Ferrol (loan)
- 2019–2020: Alavés

Senior career*
Years	Team	Apps	(Gls)
2020–2022	San Ignacio	29	(1)
2022–2023	Celta C	41	(4)
2023–2025	Celta B	64	(1)
2025–2026	Celta	14	(0)
2026–	Cádiz	0	(0)
- * Club domestic league appearances and goals as of 27 May 2026

Manuel "Manu" Fernández Arroyo (born 23 April 2001) is a Spanish professional footballer who plays for Segunda División club Cádiz CF. Mainly a centre-back, he can also play as a midfielder.

== Career ==
Born in Narón, A Coruña, Galicia, Fernández represented Racing de Ferrol and Narón BP before joining the youth categories of RC Celta de Vigo in July 2016.

On 11 August 2018, Fernández returned to Racing on loan, being a member of their Juvenil squad. On 9 August of the following year, he moved to Deportivo Alavés on a three-year contract.

Fernández was promoted to farm team Club San Ignacio ahead of the 2019–20 Tercera División season, but was mainly a backup option. On 17 February 2022, he returned to Celta to play for their C-team in Preferente de Galicia.

After helping the C's in their promotion to Tercera Federación, Fernández first appeared with the reserve team RC Celta Fortuna on 2 September 2023, coming on as a late substitute for Hugo Álvarez in a 1–0 Primera Federación home win over SD Tarazona. He subsequently became a regular starter for the B's, being converted into a centre-back by manager Claudio Giráldez.

On 18 June 2025, Fernández renewed his contract with Celta until 2028, being promoted to the first team in La Liga and reuniting with Giráldez. He made his professional debut on 23 August, starting in a 1–1 away draw against RCD Mallorca and becoming the third generation of players from his family to play for the first team.

On 21 August 2026, Fernández signed a three-year contract with Segunda División side Cádiz CF.

== Personal life ==
Fernández comes from a family of footballers also named Manuel: his grandfather Fernández Amado was a midfielder and played for Celta in the 1970s, while his father, known as Manel, was also a midfielder and played one top tier match for Celta in 1993. His younger brother Iker is also a footballer, and plays as a midfielder.

== Career statistics ==
=== Club ===
As of match played 3 May 2026

Appearances and goals by club, season and competition
Club	Season	League			National cup		Europe		Other		Total	
Club	Season	Division	Apps	Goals	Apps	Goals	Apps	Goals	Apps	Goals	Apps	Goals
San Ignacio	2020–21	Segunda División B	1	0	—		—		—		1	0
San Ignacio	2021–22	Tercera Federación	28	1	—		—		—		28	1
San Ignacio	Total		29	1	—		—		—		29	1
Celta C	2021–22	Tercera Federación	13	0	—		—		—		13	0
Celta C	2022–23	Tercera Federación	28	4	—		—		—		28	4
Celta C	Total		41	4	—		—		—		41	4
Celta B	2023–24	Primera Federación	32	0	—		—		2 (Note: Appearances in 2024 Primera Federación play-offs)	0	34	0
Celta B	2024–25	Primera Federación	32	1	—		—		—		32	1
Celta B	Total		64	1	—		—		—		64	1
Celta	2025–26	La Liga	14	0	2	0	3 (Note: Appearances in UEFA Europa League)	0	—		19	0
Career total			150	5	2	0	3	0	2	0	157	6
