= Jones El-Abdellaoui =

Moroccan footballer (born 2006)

Personal information
- Date of birth: 12 January 2006 (age 20)
- Place of birth: Oslo, Norway
- Height: 1.84 m (6 ft 0 in)
- Position: Forward

Team information
- Current team: Celta
- Number: 39

Youth career
- –2017: Skeid
- 2018–2023: Vålerenga

Senior career*
Years	Team	Apps	(Gls)
2022–2024	Vålerenga 2	34	(16)
2022–2025	Vålerenga	33	(14)
2023	→ KFUM (loan)	10	(1)
2025–	Celta B	6	(0)
2025–	Celta	22	(2)

International career^{‡}
2021	Norway U15	3	(0)
2022	Norway U16	6	(1)
2022	Morocco U17	1	(1)
2023	Norway U17	8	(3)
2024	Norway U18	6	(0)
2025–	Morocco U20	4	(2)
2026–	Morocco U23	2	(0)
- * Club domestic league appearances and goals as of 26 May 2026 ‡ National team caps and goals as of 30 March 2026

Jones El-Abdellaoui (born 12 January 2006) is a professional footballer who plays as a forward for La Liga club Celta Vigo. Born in Norway, and a former Norway youth international, he represents Morocco at youth level.

== Club career ==
El-Abdellaoui was born and raised in Veitvet in Oslo. Growing up he played for Oslo side Skeid until he joined Vålerenga at the age of 12. He signed his first professional contract with the club on 8 November 2021.

On 8 January 2025, El-Abdellaoui joined Spanish side Celta Vigo of La Liga and was assigned to their reserve team, Celta Fortuna.

== International career ==
On 14 April 2025, El-Abdellaoui's request to switch international allegiance to Morocco was approved by FIFA.

== Personal life ==
Born in Norway, El-Abdellaoui is of Moroccan descent with roots in Segangan. He is a cousin of Mohammed Abdellaoue, Mostafa Abdellaoue and Omar Elabdellaoui.

== Career statistics ==
As of match played 12 May 2026

Appearances and goals by club, season and competition
Club	Season	League			National cup (Note: Includes Norwegian Cup, Copa del Rey)		Continental		Total	
Club	Season	Division	Apps	Goals	Apps	Goals	Apps	Goals	Apps	Goals
Vålerenga 2	2022	2. divisjon	22	8	—		—		22	8
Vålerenga 2	2023	2. divisjon	9	6	—		—		9	6
Vålerenga 2	2024	2. divisjon	3	2	—		—		3	2
Vålerenga 2	Total		34	16	—		—		34	16
Vålerenga	2022	Eliteserien	2	0	0	0	—		2	0
Vålerenga	2023	Eliteserien	5	1	2	0	—		7	1
Vålerenga	2024	1. divisjon	26	13	5	1	—		31	14
Vålerenga	Total		33	14	7	1	—		40	15
KFUM (loan)	2023	1. divisjon	10	1	0	0	—		10	1
Celta Fortuna	2024–25	Primera Federación	6	0	—		—		6	0
Celta	2025–26	La Liga	22	2	2	0	7 (Note: Appearances in UEFA Europa League)	1	31	3
Career total			105	33	9	1	7	1	121	35

== Honours ==
Individual

- Norwegian First Division Young Player of the Year: 2024
