= Miguel Román (footballer) =

Spanish footballer (born 2003)

Personal information
- Full name: Miguel Román González
- Date of birth: 26 December 2002 (age 23)
- Place of birth: Gondomar, Spain
- Height: 1.78 m (5 ft 10 in)
- Position: Midfielder

Team information
- Current team: Celta
- Number: 8

Youth career
- Gondomar
- Rápido Bouzas
- 2020–2021: Choco

Senior career*
| Years | Team | Apps | (Gls) |
| 2021–2023 | Pontevedra | 66 | (2) |
| 2023–2025 | Celta B | 70 | (7) |
| 2024– | Celta | 19 | (1) |
- * Club domestic league appearances and goals as of 27 May 2026

Miguel Román González (born 26 December 2002) is a Spanish professional footballer who plays as a midfielder for club RC Celta de Vigo.

== Career ==
Born in Gondomar, Pontevedra, Galicia, Román began his career with his hometown side Gondomar CF and went on to play for Rápido de Bouzas and CD Choco as a youth. In 2021, after finishing his formation, he joined Pontevedra CF; initially for the reserves, he became a first team member after impressing in the pre-season.

Román was a regular starter for the Granates during his first senior season, scoring once in 28 matches as the club achieved promotion to Primera Federación. On 24 July 2023, after suffering relegation, he joined RC Celta de Vigo on a three-year deal and was assigned to the B-team also in the third division.

Román made his first team debut with Celta on 30 October 2024, starting in a 5–1 away routing of UD San Pedro, for the campaign's Copa del Rey. On 15 August of the following year, he renewed his contract with the club until 2028, being definitely promoted to the main squad in La Liga.

Román made his professional – and La Liga – debut on 31 August 2025, starting in a 1–1 home draw against Villarreal CF.

== Career statistics ==
As of match played 6 March 2026

Appearances and goals by club, season and competition
| Club | Season | League | | | Cup | | Europe | | Other | | Total | |
| Club | Season | Division | Apps | Goals | Apps | Goals | Apps | Goals | Apps | Goals | Apps | Goals |
|---|---|---|---|---|---|---|---|---|---|---|---|---|
| Pontevedra | 2021–22 | Segunda Federación | 28 | 1 | — | | — | | — | | 28 | 1 |
| Pontevedra | 2022–23 | Primera Federación | 38 | 1 | 3 | 0 | — | | — | | 41 | 1 |
| Pontevedra | Total | | 66 | 2 | 3 | 0 | — | | — | | 69 | 2 |
| Celta B | 2023–24 | Primera Federación | 36 | 3 | — | | — | | 2 (Note: Appearances in 2024 Primera Federación play-offs) | 0 | 38 | 3 |
| Celta B | 2024–25 | Primera Federación | 34 | 4 | — | | — | | — | | 34 | 4 |
| Celta B | Total | | 70 | 7 | — | | — | | 2 | 0 | 72 | 7 |
| Celta | 2024–25 | La Liga | 0 | 0 | — | | — | | — | | 0 | 0 |
| Celta | 2025–26 | La Liga | 19 | 1 | 8 | 0 | 2 (Note: Appearances in UEFA Europa League) | 0 | — | | 29 | 1 |
| Celta | Total | | 19 | 1 | 8 | 0 | 2 | 0 | — | | 29 | 1 |
| Career total | | | 155 | 10 | 11 | 0 | 2 | 0 | 2 | 0 | 170 | 10 |
