= Óscar Mingueza =

Spanish footballer (born 1999)

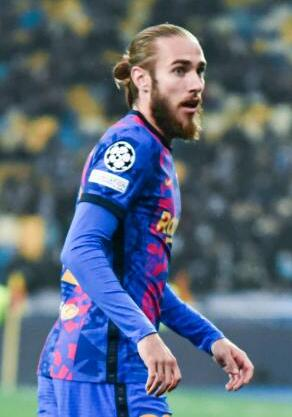
- Mingueza playing for Barcelona in 2021

Personal information
- Full name: Óscar Mingueza García
- Date of birth: 13 May 1999 (age 27)
- Place of birth: Santa Perpètua de Mogoda, Spain
- Height: 1.84 m (6 ft 0 in)
- Positions: Full-back; wing-back; centre-back

Team information
- Current team: Crystal Palace
- Number: 30

Youth career
- Santa Perpètua
- 2007–2018: Barcelona

Senior career*
Years	Team	Apps	(Gls)
2018–2021	Barcelona B	36	(0)
2020–2022	Barcelona	46	(2)
2022–2026	Celta	127	(7)
2026–	Crystal Palace	4	(0)

International career^{‡}
2021	Spain U21	3	(0)
2021	Spain U23	3	(0)
2021–	Spain	4	(0)
2022–	Catalonia	2	(0)
Medal record
Men's football
Representing Spain
UEFA Nations League
Runner-up	2025 Germany	Team
Olympic Games
Silver medal – second place	2020 Tokyo	Team
- * Club domestic league appearances and goals as of 19:30, 8 November 2026 (UTC) ‡ National team caps and goals as of 23:34, 23 March 2025 (UTC)

Óscar Mingueza García (born 13 May 1999) is a Spanish professional footballer who plays as a full-back, wing-back or centre-back for Premier League club Crystal Palace and the Spain national team.

== Club career ==
=== Barcelona ===
Born in Santa Perpètua de Mogoda, Barcelona, Catalonia, Mingueza joined Barcelona's La Masia academy in 2007 from Santa Perpètua. He won the UEFA Youth League with the club's Juvenil A team in 2018 and moved to Barcelona B for the 2018–19 season.

Mingueza made his first-team debut for Barcelona on 24 November 2020 as a replacement for the injured Gerard Piqué, starting the 4–0 2020–21 UEFA Champions League group stage victory against Dynamo Kyiv at the NSC Olimpiyskiy in Kyiv. Five days later, he made his La Liga debut in a 4–0 win against Osasuna at the Camp Nou. On 15 March 2021, Mingueza scored his first goal for Barcelona in a 4–1 home win over Huesca in La Liga. He scored his second career goal in the 60th minute of El Clásico on 10 April 2021. One week later, he won his first professional title after winning the 2020–21 Copa del Rey against Athletic Bilbao.

=== Celta Vigo ===
On 31 July 2022, Mingueza joined fellow La Liga side Celta Vigo on a permanent four-year deal for a reported fee of €3 million.

=== Crystal Palace ===
On 9 July 2026, Mingueza signed for Premier League club Crystal Palace.

== International career ==
Due to the isolation of some national team players following the positive COVID-19 test of Sergio Busquets, Spain's under-21 squad was called up for the international friendly against Lithuania on 8 June 2021. Mingueza made his senior debut in the match as Spain won 4–0. Later that month, he was included in Spain's preliminary squad for the 2020 Summer Olympics.

== Personal life ==
Óscar's younger sister, Ariadna, is also a professional footballer, having made her debut for Barcelona's women's team on 6 March 2021. His father, Juan Carlos Mingueza, is the current mayor of Santa Perpètua de Mogoda since 2026, representing Santa Perpètua en Comú.

== Career statistics ==
=== Club ===
As of match played 8 November 2026

Appearances and goals by club, season and competition
Club	Season	League			National cup (Note: Includes Copa del Rey)		League cup (Note: Includes EFL Cup)		Europe		Other		Total	
Club	Season	Division	Apps	Goals	Apps	Goals	Apps	Goals	Apps	Goals	Apps	Goals	Apps	Goals
Barcelona B	2018–19	Segunda División B	15	0	–		–		–		–		15	0
Barcelona B	2019–20	Segunda División B	16	0	–		–		–		3 (Note: Appearances in Segunda División B play-offs)	0	19	0
Barcelona B	2020–21	Segunda División B	1	0	–		–		–		1	0	2	0
Barcelona B	Total		32	0	–		–		–		3	0	36	0
Barcelona	2020–21	La Liga	27	2	5	0	–		5 (Note: Appearances in UEFA Champions League)	0	2 (Note: Appearances in Supercopa de España)	0	39	2
Barcelona	2021–22	La Liga	19	0	1	0	–		7 (Note: Five appearances in UEFA Champions League, two appearances in UEFA Europa League)	0	0	0	27	0
Barcelona	Total		46	2	6	0	–		12	0	2	0	66	2
Celta Vigo	2022–23	La Liga	21	0	2	0	–		–		–		23	0
Celta Vigo	2023–24	La Liga	38	2	3	0	–		–		–		41	2
Celta Vigo	2024–25	La Liga	34	4	2	0	–		–		–		36	4
Celta Vigo	2025–26	La Liga	34	1	2	0	–		11 (Note: Appearances in UEFA Europa League)	0	–		47	1
Celta Vigo	Total		127	7	9	0	–		11	0	–		147	7
Crystal Palace	2026–27	Premier League	4	0	0	0	2	0	3	0	–		9	0
Career total			209	9	15	0	2	0	26	0	5	0	258	9

=== International ===
As of match played 8 June 2025

Appearances and goals by national team and year
National team	Year	Apps	Goals
Spain	2021	1	0
Spain	2024	1	0
Spain	2025	2	0
Total		4	0

== Honours ==
Barcelona

- Copa del Rey: 2020–21
- UEFA Youth League: 2017–18

Spain U23

- Summer Olympic silver medal: 2020

Spain

- UEFA Nations League runner-up: 2024–25

Individual

- The Athletic La Liga Team of the Season: 2024–25
- UEFA Europa League Team of the Season: 2025–26
