= Javi Rueda =

Spanish footballer

Personal information
- Full name: Javier Rueda García
- Date of birth: 8 May 2002 (age 24)
- Place of birth: Alozaina, Spain
- Height: 1.77 m (5 ft 10 in)
- Position: Right-back

Team information
- Current team: Celta
- Number: 17

Youth career
- 2007–2013: Alozaina
- 2013–2015: Puerto Malagueño
- 2015–2016: Málaga
- 2016–2017: San Félix
- 2017–2018: Málaga
- 2018–2021: Real Madrid

Senior career*
Years	Team	Apps	(Gls)
2021–2023	Real Madrid B	0	(0)
2021–2022	→ SS Reyes (loan)	28	(2)
2022–2023	→ Murcia (loan)	28	(2)
2023–2024	Celta B	30	(2)
2024–	Celta	27	(2)
2024–2025	→ Albacete (loan)	31	(3)

International career
2019	Spain U17	1	(0)
- * Club domestic league appearances and goals as of 27 May 2026

Javier "Javi" Rueda García (born 8 May 2002) is a Spanish professional footballer who plays as a right-back for La Liga club Celta de Vigo.

== Club career ==
Rueda was born in Alozaina, Málaga, Andalusia, and joined Real Madrid's La Fábrica in 2018, after representing Málaga CF, Puerto Malagueño CF and EF Alozaina. On 13 August 2021, after finishing his formation, he was loaned to Primera División RFEF side UD San Sebastián de los Reyes for the season.

Rueda made his senior debut on 29 August 2021, starting in a 1–0 home win over Extremadura UD, and scored his first goal on 31 October, netting the opener in a 3–2 loss at CD Calahorra. The following 29 July, after being a regular starter, he moved to fellow league team Real Murcia CF also in a temporary deal.

On 21 July 2023, Rueda signed a four-year contract with RC Celta de Vigo, being initially assigned to the reserves also in the third division. He made his first team – and La Liga – debut on 26 May 2024, coming on as a second-half substitute for Kevin Vázquez in a 2–2 home draw against Valencia CF.

On 7 August 2024, Rueda was loaned to Segunda División side Albacete Balompié for the entire 2024–25 campaign. He scored his first professional goal on 21 September, netting his team's third in a 4–1 away routing of Racing de Ferrol.

== Career statistics ==
As of match played 23 May 2026

Appearances and goals by club, season and competition
Club	Season	League			Cup		Europe		Other		Total	
Club	Season	Division	Apps	Goals	Apps	Goals	Apps	Goals	Apps	Goals	Apps	Goals
Real Madrid B	2021–22	Primera Federación	0	0	—		—		—		0	0
SS Reyes (loan)	2021–22	Primera Federación	27	2	2	0	—		—		29	2
Murcia (loan)	2022–23	Primera Federación	28	2	0	0	—		—		28	2
Celta B	2023–24	Primera Federación	30	2	—		—		2 (Note: Appearances in 2024 Primera Federación play-offs)	0	32	2
Celta	2023–24	La Liga	1	0	—		—		—		1	0
Celta	2025–26	La Liga	26	2	1	0	11 (Note: Appearances in UEFA Europa League)	2	—		38	4
Celta	Total		27	2	1	0	11	2	—		39	4
Albacete (loan)	2024–25	Segunda División	31	4	0	0	—		—		31	4
Career total			143	12	3	0	11	2	2	0	159	14
