= Fer López =

Spanish footballer (born 2004)

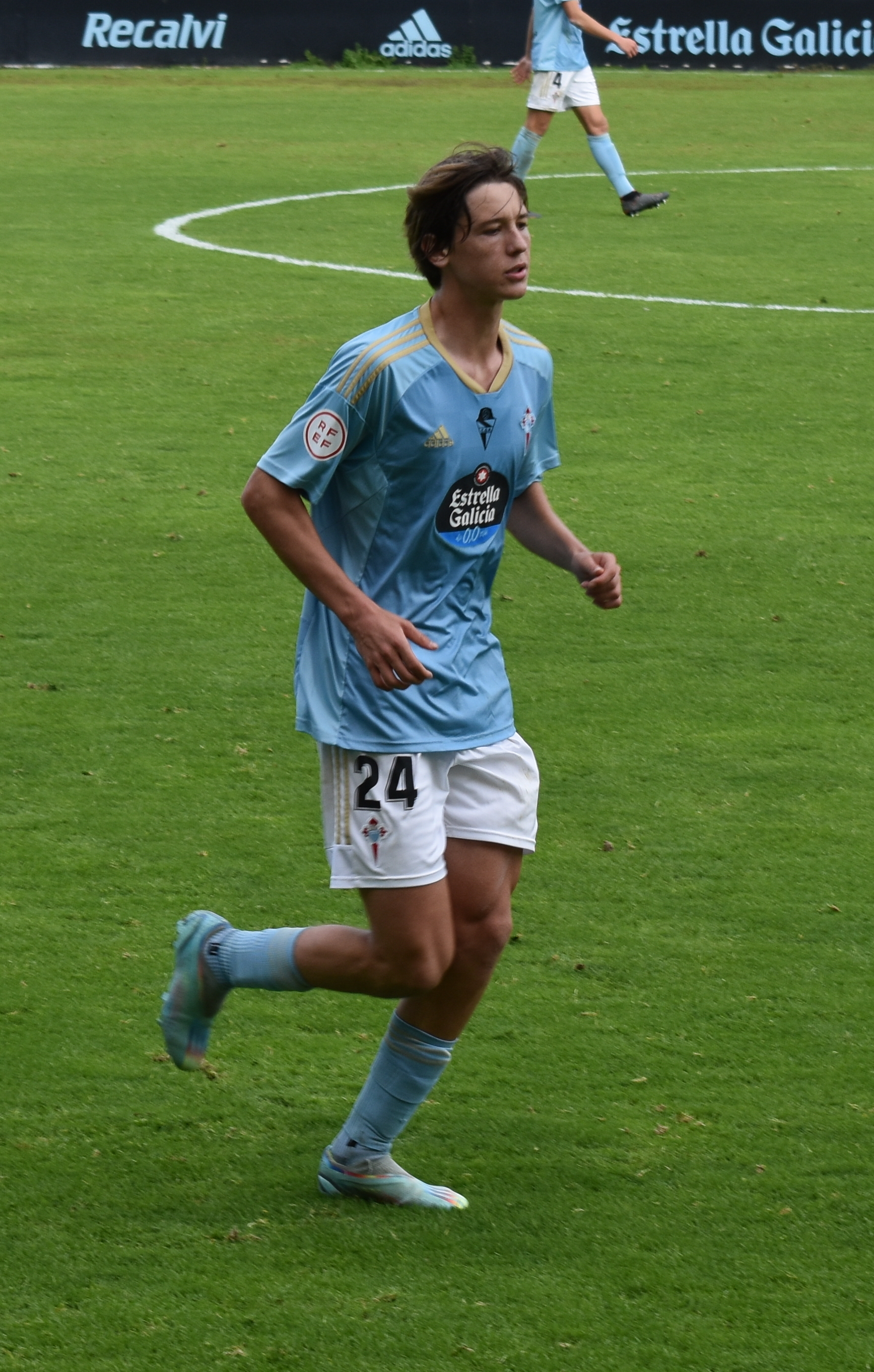
- López playing for Celta B in 2022

Personal information
- Full name: Fernando López González
- Date of birth: 24 May 2004 (age 22)
- Place of birth: Madrid, Spain
- Height: 1.88 m (6 ft 2 in)
- Position: Attacking midfielder

Team information
- Current team: Wolverhampton Wanderers
- Number: 28

Youth career
- Cristo de la Victoria
- 2013–2018: Celta
- 2018: Bacton United 89
- 2018–2022: Celta
- 2019–2020: → Rápido de Bouzas (loan)

Senior career*
| Years | Team | Apps | (Gls) |
| 2022–2023 | Gran Peña | 11 | (1) |
| 2022–2025 | Celta B | 49 | (11) |
| 2024–2025 | Celta | 17 | (2) |
| 2025– | Wolverhampton Wanderers | 21 | (6) |
| 2026 | → Celta (loan) | 17 | (1) |

International career^{‡}
| 2025– | Spain U21 | 6 | (1) |
- * Club domestic league appearances and goals as of 21:18, 31 October 2026 (UTC) ‡ National team caps and goals as of 21:18, 10 October 2026 (UTC)

Fernando López González (born 24 May 2004) is a Spanish professional footballer who plays as an attacking midfielder for EFL Championship club Wolverhampton Wanderers.

== Early life ==
López was born on 24 May 2004 in Madrid, Spain to a psychologist mother and a lawyer father. He attends the University of Vigo, where he studies a double degree in law and business administration.

He attended Finborough School just outside Stowmarket in Suffolk.

== Career ==
=== Celta ===
López began his career playing for Cristo de la Victoria, before joining Celta at the under-10's level. In 2018, López had a three-month stint living in England, training with Suffolk-based club Bacton United 89 and attending Finborough School. Upon his return to Spain, López resumed playing at Celta, being loaned out to Rápido de Bouzas during the 2019–20 season.

In 2022, López began his senior career with the club's farm team, Gran Peña. The same year, he was promoted to their reserve team.

On 27 July 2024, López renewed his contract until 2028. He made his first team debut on 30 October, coming on as a half-time substitute for Carlos Domínguez in a 5–1 away win over San Pedro, for the season's Copa del Rey.

López scored his first goals with Celta on 3 December 2024, netting a brace in a 5–1 away routing of Salamanca. He made his professional – and La Liga – debut three days later, starting in a 2–0 home win over Mallorca, but was replaced in the first half due to an injury.

=== Wolverhampton Wanderers ===
On 20 June 2025, López joined Wolverhampton Wanderers on a deal worth £19 million. He scored his first goal for the club on 7 August 2026 during the 3–0 victory against Port Vale in the EFL Cup first round.

On 20 September 2026, Lopez scored the winner for Wolves in a 1–0 home win over West Bromwich Albion in the Black Country derby, giving Wolves their first home and league win over The Baggies since 2011.

==== Loan to Celta ====
On 26 January 2026, López returned to Celta on loan for the remainder of the 2025–26 season.

== Style of play ==
López plays as an attacking midfielder and is left-footed. Spanish sports website Relevo wrote that "many in Vigo compare him to [Spain international] Iago Aspas".

== Career statistics ==
As of match played 31 October 2026

Appearances and goals by club, season and competition
| Club | Season | League | | | National cup (Note: Includes Copa del Rey, FA Cup) | | League cup (Note: Includes EFL Cup) | | Other | | Total | |
| Club | Season | Division | Apps | Goals | Apps | Goals | Apps | Goals | Apps | Goals | Apps | Goals |
|---|---|---|---|---|---|---|---|---|---|---|---|---|
| Gran Peña | 2022–23 | Tercera Federación | 11 | 1 | — | | — | | — | | 11 | 1 |
| Celta B | 2022–23 | Primera Federación | 1 | 0 | — | | — | | — | | 1 | 0 |
| Celta B | 2023–24 | Primera Federación | 31 | 7 | — | | — | | 2 (Note: Appearances in promotion play-offs) | 0 | 33 | 7 |
| Celta B | 2024–25 | Primera Federación | 17 | 4 | — | | — | | — | | 17 | 4 |
| Celta B | Total | | 49 | 11 | — | | — | | 2 | 0 | 51 | 11 |
| Celta | 2024–25 | La Liga | 17 | 2 | 3 | 2 | — | | — | | 20 | 4 |
| Wolverhampton Wanderers | 2025–26 | Premier League | 9 | 0 | 1 | 0 | 2 | 0 | — | | 12 | 0 |
| Wolverhampton Wanderers | 2026–27 | Championship | 12 | 6 | 0 | 0 | 2 | 1 | — | | 14 | 7 |
| Wolverhampton Wanderers | Total | | 21 | 6 | 1 | 0 | 4 | 1 | — | | 26 | 7 |
| Celta (loan) | 2025–26 | La Liga | 17 | 1 | — | | — | | 6 (Note: Appearances in UEFA Europa League) | 1 | 23 | 2 |
| Career total | | | 115 | 21 | 4 | 2 | 4 | 1 | 8 | 1 | 131 | 25 |
