= Copete =

Copete is a Spanish surname. Notable people with the surname include:

- Yazmín Copete (born 1964), Mexican politician
- Andrés Copete (born 1983), Colombian football forward
- Jonathan Copete (born 1988), Colombian football winger
- Luis Fernando Copete (born 1989), Nicaraguan football centre-back
- José Manuel Copete (born 1999), Spanish football centre-back
