= Carl Starfelt =

Swedish footballer (born 1995)

- Starfelt with Sweden in 2026

Personal information
- Full name: Carl Anders Theodor Starfelt
- Date of birth: 1 June 1995 (age 31)
- Place of birth: Stockholm, Sweden
- Height: 1.85 m (6 ft 1 in)
- Position: Centre-back

Team information
- Current team: Celta
- Number: 2

Youth career
- –2013: IF Brommapojkarna

Senior career*
Years	Team	Apps	(Gls)
2013–2017	IF Brommapojkarna	85	(2)
2018–2019	IFK Göteborg	44	(1)
2019–2021	Rubin Kazan	39	(3)
2021–2023	Celtic	63	(3)
2023–	Celta Vigo	77	(3)

International career^{‡}
2014	Sweden U19	2	(0)
2020–	Sweden	22	(0)
- * Club domestic league appearances and goals as of 23:48, 7 September 2026 (UTC) ‡ National team caps and goals as of 22:00, 2 October 2026 (UTC)

Carl Anders Theodor Starfelt (born 1 June 1995) is a Swedish professional footballer who plays as a centre-back for La Liga club Celta de Vigo and the Sweden national team.

== Club career ==
=== IF Brommapojkarna ===
Born in Stockholm, Sweden, Starfelt began his career with IF Brommapojkarna. He made his senior debut on 9 March 2014, coming on as a substitute for Jacob Une in a Svenska Cupen match against Jönköpings Södra IF that ended in a goalless draw. He later made his Allsvenskan debut on 30 March 2014 against Kalmar FF.

=== IFK Göteborg ===
In January 2018, Starfelt joined IFK Göteborg, one of the most successful clubs in Sweden. The transfer had been anticipated since 10 August 2017.

He made his debut for the club on 17 February 2018, starting in a Svenska Cupen match against Varbergs BoIS. IFK Göteborg won the match 1–0.

=== Rubin Kazan ===
On 13 July 2019, he signed a four-year contract with Russian Premier League club FC Rubin Kazan.

=== Celtic ===
On 21 July 2021, Starfelt agreed on a four-year contract with Scottish Premiership side Celtic. He would be involved in a centre-back partnership with fellow summer signing Cameron Carter-Vickers which helped Celtic win the 2021–22 Scottish Premiership title, as they finished with the best defensive record in the league that season.

On 2 December 2021, Starfelt was given his first ever man of the match award for his performance in a 1–0 home win against Heart of Midlothian in the Scottish Premiership.

On 19 December 2021, Starfelt started for Celtic against Hibernian in the 2021–22 Scottish League Cup final. Celtic won 2–1, thanks to a brace from Kyogo Furuhashi and Starfelt collected his first career honour.

On 18 April 2022, Starfelt scored an own goal against Rangers in extra time to give the latter a 2–1 win over Celtic, subsequently allowing Rangers to go on and win the Scottish Cup Final against Hearts.

On 14 August 2022, Starfelt scored his first goal for Celtic in a 5–0 win at Kilmarnock in the Scottish Premiership. His second goal for the club followed in a 9–0 win at Dundee United on 28 August 2022.

On 2 November 2022, Starfelt made his UEFA Champions League debut against Real Madrid in a 5–1 defeat for Celtic at the Santiago Bernabéu.

=== Celta Vigo ===
On 10 August 2023, Starfelt joined Celta Vigo from Celtic for a reported fee of £4.3 million.

He scored his first goal for the club on 4 November 2023, opening the scoring with a header from an Iago Aspas delivery in a 1–1 La Liga draw against Sevilla.

Starfelt scored his second goal for Celta on 26 August 2024 in a La Liga match against Villarreal. Despite his goal, Celta were defeated 4–3.

== International career ==
After having made two appearances for the Sweden U19 team in 2014, Starfelt was called up to the Sweden national team for the first time on 30 September 2020 ahead of their games against Russia, Croatia, and Portugal in October 2020. He made his full international debut on 8 October 2020 in a friendly game against Russia, playing all 90 minutes alongside Sebastian Holmén at centre-back in a 2–1 win for Sweden.

On 12 May 2026, Starfelt was named in the Sweden squad for the 2026 FIFA World Cup.

== Personal life ==
Starfelt is in a relationship with Australian footballer Jacynta Galabadaarachchi.

== Career statistics ==
=== Club ===
As of match played 16 September 2026

Appearances and goals by club, season and competition
Club	Season	League			National cup		League cup		Continental		Total	
Club	Season	Division	Apps	Goals	Apps	Goals	Apps	Goals	Apps	Goals	Apps	Goals
IF Brommapojkarna	2014	Allsvenskan	20	0	2	0	—		4 (Note: Appearances in UEFA Europa League)	0	26	0
IF Brommapojkarna	2015	Superettan	16	0	4	0	—		—		20	0
IF Brommapojkarna	2016	Division 1	22	1	1	0	—		—		23	1
IF Brommapojkarna	2017	Superettan	27	1	5	0	—		—		32	1
IF Brommapojkarna	Total		85	2	12	0	—		4	0	101	2
IFK Göteborg	2018	Allsvenskan	30	0	4	0	—		—		34	0
IFK Göteborg	2019	Allsvenskan	14	1	0	0	—		—		14	1
IFK Göteborg	Total		44	1	4	0	—		—		48	1
Rubin Kazan	2019–20	Russian Premier League	10	0	1	0	—		—		11	0
Rubin Kazan	2020–21	Russian Premier League	29	3	2	0	—		—		31	3
Rubin Kazan	Total		39	3	3	0	—		—		42	3
Celtic	2021–22	Scottish Premiership	34	0	3	0	3	0	9 (Note: Seven appearances in UEFA Europa League, two appearances in UEFA Europa Conference League)	0	49	0
Celtic	2022–23	Scottish Premiership	28	3	5	0	3	0	1 (Note: Appearance in UEFA Champions League)	0	37	3
Celtic	2023–24	Scottish Premiership	1	0	—		—		—		1	0
Celtic	Total		63	3	8	0	6	0	10	0	87	3
Celta Vigo	2023–24	La Liga	27	1	3	0	—		—		30	1
Celta Vigo	2024–25	La Liga	28	1	2	0	—		—		30	1
Celta Vigo	2025–26	La Liga	19	0	1	0	—		11	1	31	1
Celta Vigo	2026–27	La Liga	3	1	0	0	—		1	0	4	1
Celta Vigo	Total		77	3	6	0	—		12	1	95	4
Career total			308	12	33	0	6	0	26	1	371	13

=== International ===
As of match played 2 October 2026

Appearances and goals by national team and year
National team	Year	Apps	Goals
Sweden	2020	2	0
Sweden	2021	2	0
Sweden	2022	1	0
Sweden	2023	2	0
Sweden	2024	6	0
Sweden	2025	2	0
Sweden	2026	7	0
Total		22	0

== Honours ==
Celtic

- Scottish Premiership: 2021–22, 2022–23
- Scottish Cup: 2022–23
- Scottish League Cup: 2021–22 2022–23

Individual

- PFA Scotland Team of the Year (Premiership): 2022–23
