= Marc Vidal (footballer, born 2000) =

Spanish footballer

Personal information
- Full name: Marc Vicente Vidal Girona
- Date of birth: 14 February 2000 (age 26)
- Place of birth: Villarreal, Spain
- Height: 1.85 m (6 ft 1 in)
- Position: Goalkeeper

Team information
- Current team: Sabadell

Youth career
- 2005–2016: Villarreal
- 2016–2017: Roda

Senior career*
| Years | Team | Apps | (Gls) |
| 2017–2020 | Villarreal C | 53 | (0) |
| 2020–2021 | Villarreal B | 8 | (0) |
| 2021–2022 | Betis B | 15 | (0) |
| 2022–2024 | Andorra | 6 | (0) |
| 2023–2024 | → Barcelona B (loan) | 21 | (0) |
| 2024–2025 | Celta B | 26 | (0) |
| 2025–2026 | Celta | 0 | (0) |
| 2026– | Sabadell | 0 | (0) |

International career
| 2017–2018 | Spain U17 | 10 | (0) |
| 2019 | Spain U19 | 1 | (0) |
- * Club domestic league appearances and goals as of 27 May 2025

Marc Vicente Vidal Girona (born 14 February 2000) is a Spanish professional footballer who plays as a goalkeeper for CE Sabadell FC.

== Club career ==
Born in Villarreal, Castellón, Valencian Community, Vidal was a Villarreal CF youth graduate. He made his senior debut with the C-team on 17 September 2017, starting in a 0–1 Tercera División home loss over CD Eldense.

Promoted to the reserves in Segunda División B ahead of the 2020–21 season, Vidal was mainly a backup option to Filip Jörgensen before moving to another reserve team – Betis Deportivo Balompié – on 10 June 2021. At his new side, he shared the starting spot with Dani Rebollo.

On 9 July 2022, Vidal signed a two-year contract with Segunda División newcomers FC Andorra. He made his debut for the club on 12 November, starting in a 3–1 away win over CD Manacor, for the season's Copa del Rey.

Vidal made his professional debut on 21 December 2022, playing the full 90 minutes in a 2–1 loss at Levante UD, also for the national cup. On 21 July of the following year, he was loaned to Primera Federación side FC Barcelona Atlètic for one year.

On 8 July 2024, Vidal agreed to a deal with RC Celta de Vigo, being initially assigned to the reserves also in the third division. He was promoted to the main squad ahead of the 2025–26 season, mainly as a third-choice to Iván Villar and new signing Ionuț Radu.

Vidal left Celta in June 2026, after his contract expired, and joined CE Sabadell FC in the second division on 1 September.
