= Porriño Industrial FC =

Porriño Industrial
- Full name: Porriño Industrial Fútbol Club
- Founded: 15 February 1933; 93 years ago
- Stadium: Lourambal
- Capacity: 2,000
- President: Miguel Laso
- Head coach: Manuel Losada
- League: Preferente Futgal – Group 2
- 2025–26: Preferente Futgal – Group 2, 10th of 18
Home colours	Away colours

Porriño Industrial Fútbol Club, is a Spanish football club based in the municipality of O Porriño. Founded in 1933, they currently play in Preferente Futgal – Group 2, holding home matches at the Campos Municipales de Lourambal.

== History ==
=== Club background ===
- Porriño Fútbol Club (1933–1943)
- Club Zeltia Deportivo (1943–1965)
- Porriño Industrial Club de Fútbol (1965–1983)
- Porriño Industrial Fútbol Club (1983–present)

== Season to season ==
Season	Tier	Division	Place	Copa del Rey
1943–44	4	Serie A	2nd	
1944–45	4	Serie A	4th	
1945–46	4	Serie A	4th	
1946–47	4	Serie A	4th	
1947–48	4	Serie A	6th	
1948–49	4	Serie A	4th	
1949–50	4	Serie A	5th	
1950–51	4	Serie A	10th	
1951–52	4	Serie A	7th	
1952–53	4	Serie A	4th	
1953–54	4	Serie A	1st	
1954–55	4	Serie A	3rd	
1955–56	4	Serie A	2nd	
1956–57	4	3ª	14th	
1957–58	4	3ª	13th	
1958–59	4	3ª	8th	
1959–60	4	3ª	4th	
1960–61	4	3ª	14th	
1961–62	4	3ª	12th	
1962–63	4	3ª	16th	

Season	Tier	Division	Place	Copa del Rey
1963–64	4	Serie A	5th	
1964–65	4	Serie A	9th	
1965–66	4	Serie A	6th	
1966–67	4	Serie A	3rd	
1967–68	4	Serie A	3rd	
1968–69	4	Serie A	9th	
1969–70	6	2ª Reg.	3rd	
1970–71	5	1ª Reg.	4th	
1971–72	5	1ª Reg.	6th	
1972–73	5	1ª Reg.	2nd	
1973–74	4	Serie A	15th	
1974–75	4	Serie A	16th	
1975–76	4	Serie A	18th	
1976–77	4	Serie A	6th	
1977–78	5	Serie A	9th	
1978–79	5	Reg. Pref.	6th	
1979–80	5	Reg. Pref.	6th	
1980–81	4	3ª	9th	
1981–82	4	3ª	17th	
1982–83	4	3ª	20th	

Season	Tier	Division	Place	Copa del Rey
1983–84	5	Reg. Pref.	19th	
1984–85	6	1ª Reg.	10th	
1985–86	6	1ª Reg.	1st	
1986–87	5	Reg. Pref.	4th	
1987–88	5	Reg. Pref.	4th	
1988–89	5	Reg. Pref.	5th	
1989–90	5	Reg. Pref.	4th	
1990–91	5	Reg. Pref.	7th	
1991–92	5	Reg. Pref.	9th	
1992–93	5	Reg. Pref.	4th	
1993–94	5	Reg. Pref.	6th	
1994–95	5	Reg. Pref.	2nd	
1995–96	4	3ª	8th	
1996–97	4	3ª	11th	
1997–98	4	3ª	14th	
1998–99	4	3ª	1st	
1999–2000	4	3ª	16th	
2000–01	4	3ª	12th	
2001–02	4	3ª	19th	
2002–03	5	Reg. Pref.	1st	

Season	Tier	Division	Place	Copa del Rey
2003–04	4	3ª	8th	
2004–05	4	3ª	18th	
2005–06	5	Reg. Pref.	3rd	
2006–07	5	Pref. Aut.	13th	
2007–08	5	Pref. Aut.	15th	
2008–09	5	Pref. Aut.	4th	
2009–10	5	Pref. Aut.	5th	
2010–11	5	Pref. Aut.	16th	
2011–12	6	1ª Aut.	6th	
2012–13	6	1ª Aut.	1st	
2013–14	5	Pref. Aut.	12th	
2014–15	5	Pref. Aut.	5th	
2015–16	5	Pref.	3rd	
2016–17	5	Pref.	9th	
2017–18	5	Pref.	2nd	
2018–19	4	3ª	20th	
2019–20	5	Pref.	12th	
2020–21	5	Pref.	4th	
2021–22	6	Pref.	6th	
2022–23	6	Pref.	7th	

Season	Tier	Division	Place	Copa del Rey
2023–24	6	Pref.	6th	
2024–25	6	Pref. Futgal	12th	
2025–26	6	Pref. Futgal		

- 20 seasons in Tercera División

== Current squad ==
As of 15 January 2024

Note: Flags indicate national team as defined under FIFA eligibility rules; some limited exceptions apply. Players may hold more than one non-FIFA nationality.

No.	Pos.	Nation	Player
—	GK	ESP	Hugo Davila
—	GK	ESP	Samu
—	GK	ESP	Wendell
—	DF	ESP	David Areal
—	DF	ESP	Chisco
—	DF	ESP	Cristóbal Domínguez
—	DF	ESP	Iker López
—	DF	ESP	Mati
—	DF	ESP	Pedro Mouriño
—	DF	ESP	Nogue
—	MF	ESP	José Castillo
—	MF	ESP	Juan Fernández
—	MF	ESP	Diego González

No.	Pos.	Nation	Player
—	MF	ESP	Izan Leal
—	MF	ESP	Maikel
—	MF	ESP	Hugo Rodriguez
—	MF	ESP	Telmo
—	MF	ESP	Óscar Villar
—	FW	ESP	Albertito
—	FW	ESP	Kevin Castro
—	FW	ESP	Marcos Fontan
—	FW	ESP	Martín Martínez
—	FW	ESP	Richi
—		ESP	Pedro Alonso
—		ESP	Elias Areal
—		ESP	Alex Brilhante
