= Damián Rodríguez (footballer, born 2003) =

Spanish footballer (born 2003)

Personal information
- Full name: Damián Rodríguez Sousa
- Date of birth: 17 March 2003 (age 23)
- Place of birth: Ponteareas, Spain
- Height: 1.73 m (5 ft 8 in)
- Position: Defensive midfielder

Team information
- Current team: Cádiz (on loan from Celta)
- Number: 23

Youth career
- 2011–2022: Celta

Senior career*
Years	Team	Apps	(Gls)
2021–2024	Celta B	53	(3)
2022–2023	Celta C	10	(2)
2024–	Celta	24	(0)
2026	→ Racing Santander (loan)	20	(0)
2026–	→ Cádiz (loan)	0	(0)
- * Club domestic league appearances and goals as of 31 May 2026

Damián Rodríguez Sousa (born 17 March 2003) is a Spanish professional footballer who plays as a defensive midfielder for Segunda División club Cádiz, on loan from LaLiga club Celta Vigo.

== Club career ==
Born in Ponteareas, Pontevedra, Galicia, Rodríguez is a RC Celta de Vigo's youth graduate. He made his senior debut with the reserves on 9 May 2021, in a match against Burgos CF in the Segunda División B.

After finishing his formation, Rodríguez featured with the B's in Primera Federación and the C-team in Tercera Federación during the 2022–23 season. He scored his first goal with the reserve team on 4 December 2022, in a 2–2 draw against Algeciras CF.

On 17 March 2024, Rodríguez made his first team – and La Liga – debut, coming on as a substitute for fellow youth graduate Hugo Álvarez in the second half in a 2–1 away win over Sevilla FC. He was definitely promoted to the main squad ahead of the 2024–25 season, and renewed his contract until 2028 on 3 September 2024.

On 6 January 2026, after being rarely used during the first half of the campaign, Rodríguez was loaned to Segunda División side Racing de Santander until June. On 31 July, he moved to fellow league team Cádiz CF also in a temporary deal.

== Honours ==
Racing Santander

- Segunda División: 2025–26
