= Claudio Giráldez =

Spanish footballer

Personal information
- Full name: Claudio Giráldez González
- Date of birth: 24 February 1988 (age 38)
- Place of birth: O Porriño, Spain
- Height: 1.86 m (6 ft 1 in)
- Position: Left back

Team information
- Current team: Celta (manager)

Youth career
- Porriño Industrial
- 2001–2006: Real Madrid

Senior career*
| Years | Team | Apps | (Gls) |
| 2006–2008 | Real Madrid C | | |
| 2007 | Real Madrid B | 1 | (0) |
| 2008–2009 | Atlético Madrid B | 35 | (4) |
| 2009–2011 | Pontevedra | 35 | (1) |
| 2010 | Pontevedra B | 2 | (0) |
| 2011–2013 | Ourense | 67 | (1) |
| 2013–2014 | Coruxo | 18 | (0) |
| 2014–2019 | Porriño Industrial | | (21) |

Managerial career
- 2019–2021: Gran Peña
- 2022–2024: Celta B
- 2024–: Celta
- * Club domestic league appearances and goals

Claudio Giráldez González (born 24 February 1988) is a Spanish professional football manager and former player who played as a left back. He is the manager of La Liga club Celta Vigo.

== Playing career ==
Born in O Porriño, Pontevedra, Galicia, Giráldez joined Real Madrid's youth setup in 2001, from hometown side Porriño Industrial. He made his senior debut with the C-team during the 2006–07 season, in Tercera División.

In 2007, after one appearance with Real's reserves in Segunda División B, Giráldez moved to cross-town rivals Atlético Madrid and was assigned to the B-team also in the third division.

Giráldez returned to his home region in 2009, joining fellow third tier side Pontevedra. He signed for Ourense in the fourth level on 28 July 2011, helping in their promotion to the third division in his first season; he left the latter club in May 2013.

On 17 June 2013, Giráldez agreed to a deal with Coruxo in the third level. After being sparingly used during the campaign, he returned to his first club Porriño in 2014, where he scored a career-best eight goals during the 2015–16 season.

Giráldez helped Porriño in their promotion to the fourth division in 2018, and retired in the following year, aged 31.

== Managerial career ==
In 2015, while still a player, Giráldez was also named manager of Porriño Industrial's Juvenil squad. In the following year, he joined Celta's structure, and was a manager of their Cadete B, Cadete A and Juvenil B squads.

On 27 June 2019, Giráldez was named in charge of Gran Peña, Celta's farm team, and also remained manager of their Juvenil B team. On 10 August 2021, he was appointed manager of the Juvenil División de Honor squad.

On 2 July 2022, Giráldez replaced Onésimo Sánchez at the helm of Celta's B-team; the club officially announced his new role ten days later. In his first season in charge of the B's, he led them to the play-offs, losing in the semi-finals to eventual winners Eldense.

On 12 March 2024, Giráldez was named manager of Celta's first team, replacing Rafael Benítez. His first professional match in charge occurred five days later, as his side won 2–1 at Sevilla.

== Managerial statistics ==
As of 21 November 2026

Managerial record by team and tenure
| Team | Nat | From | To | Record | | | | | | | | Ref |
| Team | Nat | From | To | G | W | D | L | GF | GA | GD | Win % | Ref |
|---|---|---|---|---|---|---|---|---|---|---|---|---|
| Gran Peña | (Spain) | 27 June 2019 | 10 August 2021 | 36 | 13 | 6 | 17 | 44 | 48 | −4 | 36.11 | |
| Celta Fortuna | (Spain) | 2 July 2022 | 12 March 2024 | 67 | 31 | 16 | 20 | 97 | 72 | +25 | 46.27 | |
| Celta Vigo | (Spain) | 12 March 2024 | present | 126 | 51 | 32 | 43 | 196 | 169 | +27 | 40.48 | |
| Career total | | | | 229 | 95 | 54 | 80 | 337 | 289 | +48 | 41.48 | — |
