= Betway Cup =

- Founded: 2015; 11 years ago
- Teams: 2
- Most championships: (England) West Ham United (3 titles)

The Betway Cup was a pre-season friendly competition hosted annually by Premier League club West Ham United, from 2015–2024. It was sponsored by betting company Betway, who also served as West Ham United's principal sponsors during that period.

The inaugural tournament was held in 2015 at West Ham's previous home Upton Park, with the second tournament taking place at the London Stadium in 2016.

== Background ==
Prior to Betway's sponsorship of West Ham United, the club hosted the Out Performance Display Cup, sponsored by the Essex-based signage company of the same name at Southend United, beating Dutch club 1–0 Vitesse on 9 August 2002. In August 2003, West Ham played PSV Eindhoven at the Boleyn Ground in the second edition, losing 1–2. The cup ran for two more seasons, against Anderlecht and Osasuna respectively.

In 2008, West Ham hosted Villarreal in the Bobby Moore Cup in aid of the Bobby Moore Fund for Cancer Research UK, as well as facing Napoli in August 2009.

During SBOBET's sponsorship of the club, the bookmaker sponsored West Ham's pre-season tournament ahead of the 2010–11 season, with the first edition seeing West Ham host Deportivo La Coruña. In 2014, Marathonbet sponsored West Ham's annual pre-season home cup game, a 3–2 win against Sampdoria, before Betway's sponsorship of the club.

== History ==
=== 2015 ===
| 2 August 2015 Betway Cup | West Ham United | 1–2 | (Germany) Werder Bremen | Toluca, Mexico |
| 15:00 BST | Sakho 19' | Report | Ujah 20', 31' | Stadium: Boleyn Ground; Attendance: 9,919; Referee: Graham Scott |

=== 2016 ===
West Ham United played reigning Italian champions Juventus at the London Stadium in the official opening of the stadium after being handed to West Ham following the 2012 Summer Olympics, despite playing Slovenian side NK Domžale in the first game at the stadium three days prior in the UEFA Europa League. Juventus striker Simone Zaza scored the winner for the Italian club and signed for West Ham on loan later in August.

| 7 August 2016 Betway Cup | West Ham United | 2–3 | (Italy) Juventus | Stratford, London |
| 13:00 BST | Carroll 34', 52' | Report | Dybala 18'; Mandžukić 21'; Zaza 85' | Stadium: London Stadium; Attendance: 53,966; Referee: Anthony Taylor |

=== First leg ===
| 28 July 2017 Betway Cup | Werder Bremen (Germany) | 1–0 | West Ham United | Schneverdingen, Germany |
| 18:30 CEST | Eggestein 12' | Report | | Stadium: Osterwald-Stadion; Attendance: 3,350 |

=== Second leg ===
| 29 July 2017 Betway Cup | Werder Bremen (Germany) | 2–2 (3–2 agg.) | West Ham United | Lohne, Germany |
| 15:30 CEST | Caldirola 15'; Zhang Yuning 81' | Report | Arnautović 26'; Martínez 75' | Stadium: Heinz-Dettmer; Attendance: 3,646 |

=== 2018 ===
| 31 July 2018 Betway Cup | Mainz 05 (Germany) | 1–1 (6–7 p) | West Ham United | Schwaz, Austria |
| 17:30 BST | Quaison 79' | Report | Martínez 69' | Stadium: Silberstadt Arena; Referee: Walter Altmann |
| | Penalties |
| | De Blasis (penalty missed); Quaison (penalty scored); Mateta (penalty scored); Burkardt (penalty scored); Brosinski (penalty scored); Donati (penalty scored); Baku (penalty scored); Bussmann (penalty missed) | | (penalty missed) Masuaku; (penalty scored) Snodgrass; (penalty scored) Martínez; (penalty scored) Obiang; (penalty scored) Arnautović; (penalty scored) Cullen; (penalty scored) Adrián; (penalty scored) Diop |

=== 2019 ===
| 3 August 2019 Betway Cup | West Ham United | 2–2 (2–4 p) | (Spain) Athletic Bilbao | Stratford, London |
| 15:00 BST | Lanzini 22'; Wilshere 23' | Report | Haller 1' (o.g.); Williams 15' | Stadium: London Stadium; Attendance: 38,873; Referee: Michael Oliver (England) |
| | Penalties |
| | Hernández (penalty missed); Snodgrass (penalty scored); Yarmolenko (penalty scored); Diangana (penalty missed) | | (penalty scored) Aduriz; (penalty scored) Beñat; (penalty missed) Ibai; (penalty scored) Sancet; (penalty scored) Berchiche |

=== 2020 ===
The 2020 edition of the Betway Cup was contested behind closed doors as a result of the COVID-19 pandemic.

| 5 September 2020 Betway Cup | West Ham United | 3–5 | AFC Bournemouth | Stratford, London |
| 15:00 BST | Bowen 38', 42'; Felipe Anderson 84' | Report | Danjuma 5'; Solanke 17'; Gosling 57'; Smith 62'; Anthony 67' | Stadium: London Stadium; Attendance: 0 |

=== 2021 ===
| 7 August 2021 Betway Cup | West Ham United | 2–0 | (Italy) Atalanta | Stratford, London |
| 15:00 BST | Antonio 45'; Fornals 89' | Report | | Stadium: London Stadium; Attendance: 27,665; Referee: Stuart Attwell |

=== 2024 ===
| 10 August 2024 Betway Cup | West Ham United | 2–2 (6–5 p) | (Spain) Celta Vigo | Stratford, London |
| 15:00 BST | Bowen 6'; Paquetá 35' | Report | Ristić 21'; Durán 66' | Stadium: London Stadium; Referee: Darren Bond |
| | Penalties |
| | Cresswell (penalty scored); Ward-Prowse (penalty scored); Souček (penalty scored); Füllkrug (penalty missed); Aguerd (penalty scored); Kilman (penalty scored); Guilherme (penalty scored) | | (penalty missed) Moriba; (penalty scored) Álvarez; (penalty scored) Sotelo; (penalty scored) Alfon; (penalty scored) Domínguez; (penalty scored) Aidoo; (penalty missed) Durán |

== Wins by club ==
| Club | Winners |
|---|---|
| (England) West Ham United | 3 |
| (Germany) Werder Bremen | 2 |
| (Italy) Juventus | 1 |
| (Spain) Athletic Bilbao | 1 |
| (England) AFC Bournemouth | 1 |
