= 2022–23 RC Celta de Vigo season =

Celta Vigo
2022–23 season
- President: Carlos Mouriño
- Head coach: Eduardo Coudet (until 2 November); Carlos Carvalhal (from 2 November)
- Stadium: Balaídos
- La Liga: 13th
- Copa del Rey: Round of 32
- Top goalscorer: League: Iago Aspas (12); All: Iago Aspas (12)
Home colours	Away colours	Third colours

Emergency away kit, used against UNAM.

The 2022–23 season was the 99th season in the existence of RC Celta de Vigo and the club's 11th consecutive season in the top flight of Spanish football. In addition to the domestic league, Celta Vigo participated in this season's edition of the Copa del Rey.

== Players ==
=== First-team squad ===
As of 31 January 2023

Note: Flags indicate national team as defined under FIFA eligibility rules; some limited exceptions apply. Players may hold more than one non-FIFA nationality.

No.	Pos.	Nation	Player
1	GK	ARG	Agustín Marchesín
2	DF	ESP	Hugo Mallo (captain)
3	DF	ESP	Óscar Mingueza
4	DF	ESP	Unai Núñez (on loan from Athletic Bilbao)
5	MF	ESP	Óscar Rodríguez (on loan from Sevilla)
7	FW	ESP	Carles Pérez (on loan from Roma)
8	MF	ESP	Fran Beltrán
9	FW	POR	Gonçalo Paciência
10	FW	ESP	Iago Aspas (vice-captain)
11	MF	ARG	Franco Cervi

No.	Pos.	Nation	Player
13	GK	ESP	Iván Villar
14	MF	PER	Renato Tapia
15	DF	GHA	Joseph Aidoo
17	DF	ESP	Javi Galán
18	FW	NOR	Jørgen Strand Larsen
19	MF	SWE	Williot Swedberg
20	DF	ESP	Kevin Vázquez
21	MF	ARG	Augusto Solari
23	MF	USA	Luca de la Torre
24	MF	ESP	Gabri Veiga

=== Reserve team ===
Note: Flags indicate national team as defined under FIFA eligibility rules; some limited exceptions apply. Players may hold more than one non-FIFA nationality.

No.	Pos.	Nation	Player
26	DF	ESP	Carlos Domínguez
27	GK	ESP	Raúl García
29	FW	ESP	Miguel Rodríguez
30	MF	ESP	Hugo Álvarez
31	GK	ESP	Coke Carrillo

No.	Pos.	Nation	Player
32	FW	ESP	Fran López
33	DF	ESP	Martín Conde
34	GK	CUB	Christian Joel (on loan from Sporting Gijón)
35	FW	ESP	Pablo Durán
36	DF	ESP	Fernando Medrano

=== Out on loan ===
Note: Flags indicate national team as defined under FIFA eligibility rules; some limited exceptions apply. Players may hold more than one non-FIFA nationality.

No.	Pos.	Nation	Player
—	GK	ESP	Rubén Blanco (at Marseille until 30 June 2023)
—	DF	ESP	Sergio Carreira (at Villarreal B until 30 June 2023)
—	DF	ESP	José Fontán (at Go Ahead Eagles until 30 June 2023)
—	MF	ESP	Denis Suárez (at Espanyol until 30 June 2023)
—	MF	ESP	Miguel Baeza (at Rio Ave until 30 June 2023)

No.	Pos.	Nation	Player
—	MF	MEX	Orbelín Pineda (at AEK Athens until 30 June 2023)
—	FW	ESP	Alfon (at Murcia until 30 June 2023)
—	FW	URU	Gabriel Fernández (at Juárez until 30 June 2023)
—	FW	ESP	Julen Lobete (at RKC Waalwijk until 30 June 2023)
—	FW	ESP	Santi Mina (at Al Shabab until 30 June 2023)

== Transfers ==
=== In ===
Date	Player	From	Type	Fee	Ref.
1 July 2022	(Sweden) Williot Swedberg	(Sweden) Hammarby IF	Transfer	€4.7M	
8 July 2022	(United States) Luca de la Torre	(Netherlands) Heracles Almelo	Transfer	€1.9M	
8 July 2022	(Spain) Óscar Rodríguez	Sevilla	Loan	Free	
16 July 2022	(Spain) Unai Núñez	Athletic Bilbao	Loan		
26 July 2022	(Spain) Julen Lobete	Real Sociedad	Transfer	Undisclosed	
6 August 2022	(Portugal) Gonçalo Paciência	(Germany) Eintracht Frankfurt	Transfer	Undisclosed	
8 August 2022	(Spain) Carles Pérez	(Italy) Roma	Loan		

=== Out ===
Date	Player	To	Type	Fee	Ref.
1 July 2022	(Mexico) Néstor Araujo	(Mexico) América	Transfer	Undisclosed fee	
1 July 2022	(Spain) José Fontán	(Netherlands) Go Ahead Eagles	Loan		
6 July 2022	(Spain) Brais Méndez	Real Sociedad	Transfer	€14M	
15 July 2022	(Mexico) Orbelín Pineda	(Greece) AEK Athens	Loan		
18 July 2022	(Turkey) Okay Yokuşlu	(England) West Bromwich Albion	Transfer	Free	
20 July 2022	(Spain) Rubén Blanco	(France) Marseille	Loan		
28 July 2022	(Spain) Julen Lobete	(Netherlands) RKC Waalwijk	Loan		
5 September 2022	(Spain) Nolito	UD Ibiza	Transfer	Free	

== Pre-season and friendlies ==
Win Draw Loss Fixtures

13 July 2022 Friendly	UNAM	1–1	Celta Vigo	Mexico City, Mexico
19:15 (UTC-5)	Diogo 22'	Report	Aspas 45'	Stadium: Estadio Olímpico Universitario

20 July 2022 Friendly	San Jose Earthquakes	1–1	Celta Vigo	San Jose, United States
19:30 PT (UTC-7)	López 44'; Ågren (yellow card) 60'	Report	Tapia (yellow card) 24'; Aspas 40' (pen.); Veiga (yellow card) 70'	Stadium: PayPal Park

29 July 2022 Friendly	Braga	2–1	Celta Vigo	Braga, Portugal
20:00 WEST (UTC+1)	Banza 22'; Gomes 85'	Report	Aspas 49'	Stadium: Estádio Municipal de Braga; Referee: Carlos Macedo

6 August 2022 XXVI Quinocho Memorial Trophy	Celta Vigo	6–0	Al Shabab	Vigo
20:00 CEST (UTC+2)	Paciência 30'; Aspas 35', 45', 61', 67', 69'	Report		Stadium: Balaídos

7 December 2022 Friendly	Celta Vigo	1–1	Boavista	Vigo, Spain
18:00 CET (UTC+1)	Aspas 36'; Bozeník (yellow card) 68'; De la Torre (yellow card) 76'; Domínguez (yellow card) 68'		Bozeník 41'; Makouta (yellow card) 68'; Njie (yellow card) 70'; Reisinho (yellow card) 71'	Stadium: Estadio Municipal de Atletismo de Balaídos

== Competitions ==
=== Overall record ===
Competition	First match	Last match	Starting round	Final position	Record							
Competition	First match	Last match	Starting round	Final position	Pld	W	D	L	GF	GA	GD	Win %
La Liga	13 August 2022	4 June 2023	Matchday 1	13th	38	11	10	17	43	53	−10	28.95
Copa del Rey	13 November 2022	3 January 2023	First round	Round of 32	3	2	0	1	10	4	+6	66.67
Total					41	13	10	18	53	57	−4	31.71

Source: Soccerway

=== La Liga ===
==== League table ====
Pos	Team	Pld	W	D	L	GF	GA	GD	Pts	Qualification or relegation
11	Rayo Vallecano	38	13	10	15	45	53	−8	49 (Note: Head-to-head points: Girona 8, Rayo Vallecano 6, Sevilla 1.)	
12	Sevilla	38	13	10	15	47	54	−7	49	Qualification for the Champions League group stage (Note: Sevilla qualified for the 2023–24 UEFA Champions League by winning the 2022–23 UEFA Europa League.)
13	Celta Vigo	38	11	10	17	43	53	−10	43	
14	Cádiz	38	10	12	16	30	53	−23	42 (Note: Head-to-head points: Cádiz 8, Getafe 5, Valencia 3.)	
15	Getafe	38	10	12	16	34	45	−11	42	

Source: LaLiga Santander
Rules for classification: 1) Points; 2) Head-to-head points; 3) Head-to-head goal difference; 4) Goal difference; 5) Goals scored; 6) Fair-play points (Note: Head-to-head record is used only after all the matches between the teams in question have been played)

==== Results summary ====
Overall								Home						Away					
Pld	W	D	L	GF	GA	GD	Pts	W	D	L	GF	GA	GD	W	D	L	GF	GA	GD
38	11	10	17	43	53	−10	43	7	6	6	26	21	+5	4	4	11	17	32	−15

Source: La Liga

==== Results by round ====
Round	1	2	3	4	5	6	7	8	9	10	11	12	13	14	15	16	17	18	19	20	21	22	23	24	25	26	27	28	29	30	31	32	33	34	35	36	37	38
Ground	H	H	A	H	A	A	H	A	H	A	H	A	H	A	H	A	H	A	H	A	H	A	H	A	H	A	H	A	H	A	H	A	A	H	A	H	A	H
Result	D	L	W	W	L	L	W	L	L	L	D	L	L	D	D	W	D	L	W	W	L	D	W	D	W	W	D	D	L	L	W	L	L	L	L	D	L	W
Position	9	16	12	8	13	13	11	11	11	14	13	17	18	17	17	16	16	17	16	12	14	14	13	12	11	9	10	10	12	13	13	13	13	13	15	14	17	13

Source: La Liga
A = Away; H = Home; W = Win; D = Draw; L = Loss

==== Matches ====
The league fixtures were announced on 23 June 2022.

13 August 2022 1	Celta Vigo	2–2	Espanyol	Vigo
17:00 CEST (UTC+2)	Mallo (yellow card) 15'; Aidoo (yellow card) 37'; Aspas 45+2', (yellow card) 80'; Paciência 63'; Galán (yellow card) 90+2'; Marchesín (yellow card) 90+7'	Report	Vinícius (yellow card) 60'; Expósito 72'; Gil (yellow card) 90+1'; Joselu 90+8'	Stadium: Balaídos; Attendance: 13,859; Referee: Miguel Ángel Ortiz Arias

20 August 2022 2	Celta Vigo	1–4	Real Madrid	Vigo
22:00 CEST (UTC+2)	Tapia (yellow card) 13'; Aspas 23' (pen.); Mallo (yellow card) 85'	Report	Benzema 14' (pen.); Modrić 42'; Vinícius 56'; Carvajal (yellow card) 65'; Valverde 66'; Alaba (yellow card) 68'; Hazard (penalty missed) 87'	Stadium: Balaídos; Attendance: 15,681; Referee: Jesús Gil Manzano

26 August 2022 3	Girona	0–1	Celta Vigo	Girona
20:00 CEST (UTC+2)	López (yellow card) 43'; Juanpe (yellow card) 45'	Report	Aspas 49'; Tapia (yellow card) 68'	Stadium: Estadi Montilivi; Attendance: 11,329; Referee: Carlos del Cerro Grande

2 September 2022 4	Celta Vigo	3–0	Cádiz	Vigo
21:00 CEST (UTC+2)	Aspas 56', 75'; Óscar 62'; Strand Larsen (yellow card) 78'	Report	Lozano (yellow card) 27'; Zaldúa (yellow card) 90+1'	Stadium: Balaídos; Attendance: 14,510; Referee: Juan Luis Pulido Santana

10 September 2022 5	Atlético Madrid	4–1	Celta Vigo	Madrid
21:00 CEST (UTC+2)	Correa 9'; Hermoso (yellow card) 16'; De Paul 50'; Koke (yellow card) 56'; Carrasco 66'; Núñez 82' (o.g.)	Report	Núñez (yellow card) 16'; Veiga 71', (yellow card) 90+4'; Aspas (yellow card) 90+4'	Stadium: Wanda Metropolitano; Attendance: 52,247; Referee: Alejandro Hernández Hernández

17 September 2022 6	Valencia	3–0	Celta Vigo	Valencia
18:30 CEST (UTC+2)	Guillamón (yellow card) 16'; Castillejo 37', (yellow card) 69'; Lino (yellow card) 55'; Marcos André 82'; Almeida 90+3'	Report	Beltrán (yellow card) 52'; Cervi (red card) 59'; Veiga (yellow card) 78'	Stadium: Mestalla; Attendance: 40,965; Referee: Pablo González Fuertes

2 October 2022 7	Celta Vigo	1–0	Real Betis	Vigo
16:15 CEST (UTC+2)	Veiga 9', (yellow card) 30'; Larsen (yellow card) 32'; Galán (yellow card) 35'; Mingueza (yellow card) 90'	Report	Luiz Felipe (red card) 20'; Pezzella (yellow card) 32'; Canales (yellow card) 65'; Fekir (yellow card) 84'	Stadium: Balaídos; Attendance: 14,344; Referee: César Soto Grado

9 October 2022 8	Barcelona	1–0	Celta Vigo	Barcelona
21:00 CEST (UTC+2)	Pedri 17'; Alba (yellow card) 71'; Busquets (yellow card) 85'	Report	Núñez (yellow card) 61'; Aidoo (yellow card) 70'; Óscar (yellow card) 71'	Stadium: Camp Nou; Attendance: 81,525; Referee: José Luis Munuera Montero

16 October 2022 9	Celta Vigo	1–2	Real Sociedad	Vigo
14:00 CEST (UTC+2)	Aspas 39'; Larsen (yellow card) 45+8'; Mallo (yellow card) 49'; Pérez (yellow card) 77'; Mingueza (yellow card) 81'; Marchesín (yellow card) 90+2'; Paciência (red card) 90+4'	Report	Illarramendi (yellow card) 24', (goal) 30'; Le Normand (yellow card) 45'; Zubimendi (yellow card) 45+4'; Zubeldia 54', (yellow card) 69'; Silva (yellow card) 68'; Barrenetxea (yellow card) 89'; Navarro (yellow card) 90+3'	Stadium: Balaídos; Attendance: 13,101; Referee: Guillermo Cuadra Fernández

19 October 2022 10	Valladolid	4–1	Celta Vigo	Valladolid
19:00 CEST (UTC+2)	Mesa 32'; Joaquín 62'; León 74', 79', (penalty missed) 78'; Masip (yellow card) 90+2'	Report	Óscar (yellow card) 28', (goal) 43'; Aspas (penalty missed) 88'	Stadium: José Zorrilla; Attendance: 16,547; Referee: Valentín Pizarro Gómez

24 October 2022 11	Celta Vigo	1–1	Getafe	Vigo
21:00 CEST (UTC+2)	Núñez (yellow card) 42'; Aidoo 89'	Report	Ünal 43'; Mata (yellow card) 84'	Stadium: Balaídos; Attendance: 9,774; Referee: Pablo González Fuertes

29 October 2022 12	Almería	3–1	Celta Vigo	Almería
14:00 CEST (UTC+2)	Embarba (yellow card) 22'; De la Hoz (yellow card) 27', (goal) 60'; Lázaro 52'; Melero (yellow card) 84'; Ely (yellow card) 90+2'; Eguaras 90+6'	Report	Veiga 25', (red card) 32'	Stadium: Power Horse Stadium; Attendance: 11,080; Referee: Carlos del Cerro Grande

5 November 2022 13	Celta Vigo	1–2	Osasuna	Vigo
18:30 CET (UTC+1)	Aspas 19'; Swedberg (yellow card) 66'	Report	U. García (yellow card) 5'; Ávila 8', 28', (yellow card) 16'; Oroz (yellow card) 42'; Fernández (yellow card) 44'; Kike (yellow card) 88'	Stadium: Balaídos; Attendance: 14,209; Referee: Jorge Figueroa Vázquez

10 November 2022 14	Rayo Vallecano	0–0	Celta Vigo	Madrid
19:00 CET (UTC+1)	Comesaña (yellow card) 25'; A. García (yellow card) 40'; Falcao (yellow card) 42'; Lejeune (yellow card) 43'; Valentín (yellow card) 54'; Salvi (yellow card) 87'; Catena (yellow card) 90+6'	Report	Paciência (yellow card) 53'	Stadium: Campo de Fútbol de Vallecas; Attendance: 12,419; Referee: José Luis Munuera Montero

30 December 2022 15	Celta Vigo	1–1	Sevilla	Vigo
19:15 CET (UTC+1)	Beltrán (yellow card) 15'; Veiga 33'; Mallo (yellow card) 79'	Report	Carmona (yellow card) 9' (yellow-red card) 86'; Jordán (yellow card) 30'; Salas 54'; Lamela (yellow card) 89'	Stadium: Balaídos; Attendance: 13,653; Referee: Ricardo de Burgos Bengoetxea

6 January 2023 16	Elche	0–1	Celta Vigo	Elche
18:30 CET (UTC+1)	González (yellow card) 53'; Boyé (yellow card) 64'; Milla (yellow card) 81'; Bigas (red card) 90+1'	Report	Aspas 5'; Paciência (yellow card) 30'	Stadium: Martínez Valero; Attendance: 20,121; Referee: Miguel Ángel Ortiz Arias

13 January 2023 17	Celta Vigo	1–1	Villarreal	Vigo
19:00 CET (UTC+1)	Larsen 68'	Report	Gerard 15'; Trigueros (yellow card) 26'; Morales (yellow card) 68'	Stadium: Balaídos; Attendance: 13,931; Referee: Javier Alberola Rojas

20 January 2023 18	Mallorca	1–0	Celta Vigo	Palma
21:00 CET (UTC+1)	Baba (yellow card) 32'; Rodríguez 59'; Rajković (yellow card) 76'; Prats (yellow card) 90+5'	Report	Aidoo (yellow card) 86'; Óscar (yellow card) 89'	Stadium: Visit Mallorca Stadium; Attendance: 12,253; Referee: Juan Luis Pulido Santana

29 January 2023 19	Celta Vigo	1–0	Athletic Bilbao	Vigo
18:30 CET (UTC+1)	Tapia (yellow card) 36'; Aspas 71'; Núñez (yellow card) 81'	Report	Yeray (yellow card) 61'; Zarraga (yellow card) 87'	Stadium: Balaídos; Attendance: 14,696; Referee: Isidro Díaz de Mera Escuderos

4 February 2023 20	Real Betis	3–4	Celta Vigo	Seville
21:00 CET (UTC+1)	Juanmi 9'; Canales 23'; Fekir 84' (pen.); Luiz Henrique (yellow card) 88'; Luiz Felipe (red card) 90+5'; Joaquín (yellow card) 90+7'	Report	Larsen 6'; Veiga 42', 56'; Aidoo 69'; De la Torre (yellow card) 73'; Núñez (yellow card) 90+5'; Aspas (yellow card) 90+10'	Stadium: Benito Villamarín; Attendance: 45,849; Referee: Carlos del Cerro Grande

12 February 2023 21	Celta Vigo	0–1	Atlético Madrid	Vigo
16:15 CET (UTC+1)	Aidoo (yellow card) 4'; Veiga (yellow card) 8'	Report	Mandava (yellow card) 41'; Savić (red card) 70'; Molina (yellow card) 87'; Depay 89'	Stadium: Balaídos; Attendance: 15,461; Referee: Jorge Figueroa Vásquez

18 February 2023 22	Real Sociedad	1–1	Celta Vigo	San Sebastián
14:00 CET (UTC+1)	Oyarzabal 5'; Zubimendi (yellow card) 47'; Sørloth (yellow card) 59'; Barrenetxea (yellow card) 62'	Report	Pérez (yellow card) 55'; Núñez (yellow card) 59'; Tapia (yellow card) 74' (yellow-red card) 75'; Seferovic (yellow card) 90+1'; Le Normand 90+3' (o.g.)	Stadium: Reale Arena; Attendance: 29,312; Referee: Miguel Ángel Ortiz Arias

26 February 2023 23	Celta Vigo	3–0	Valladolid	Vigo
16:15 CET (UTC+1)	Seferovic 17'; Veiga 32', 64'; Óscar (yellow card) 66'	Report	Monchu (yellow card) 30'; Kike (yellow card) 38'; J. Sánchez (yellow card) 79'; Amallah (red card) 84'	Stadium: Balaídos; Attendance: 14,755; Referee: Ricardo De Burgos Bengoetxea

6 March 2023 24	Osasuna	0–0	Celta Vigo	Pamplona
21:00 CET (UTC+1)		Report	De la Torre (yellow card) 13'; Mallo (yellow card) 90+3'	Stadium: El Sadar; Attendance: 17,684; Referee: José María Sánchez Martínez

11 March 2023 25	Celta Vigo	3–0	Rayo Vallecano	Vigo
18:30 CET (UTC+1)	Beltrán (yellow card) 11'; Aspas 51', 85'; Ciss 52' (o.g.); Óscar (yellow card) 75'	Report	Comesaña (yellow card) 23'; Balliu (yellow card) 45+1'; Lejeune (yellow card) 90+1'	Stadium: Balaídos; Attendance: 14,451; Referee: Juan Luis Pulido Santana

18 March 2023 26	Espanyol	1–3	Celta Vigo	Cornellà de Llobregat
18:30 CET (UTC+1)	Darder (yellow card) 31'; Cabrera (yellow card) 44'; Gragera 86'	Report	Veiga 26'; Aspas 45' (pen.); Galán (yellow card) 62'; Pérez 82'; Larsen (yellow card) 90'	Stadium: RCDE Stadium; Attendance: 26,231; Referee: Guillermo Cuadra Fernández

2 April 2023 27	Celta Vigo	2–2	Almería	Vigo
14:00 CEST (UTC+2)	Seferovic 10'; Pérez 42', (yellow card) 45'; Aspas (yellow card) 82'; Veiga (yellow card) 83'	Report	Babić 7'; Puigmal (yellow card) 31', (goal) 32'; Fernando (yellow card) 62'; Costa (yellow card) 74'; Suárez (yellow card) 82'; Baptistão (yellow card) 83'	Stadium: Balaídos; Attendance: 14,011; Referee: Alejandro Hernández Hernández

7 April 2023 28	Sevilla	2–2	Celta Vigo	Seville
21:00 CEST (UTC+2)	Gueye (yellow card) 6' (yellow-red card) 19'; En-Nesyri 43', (yellow card) 43'; Navas (yellow card) 63'; Acuña 81', (red card) 90+5'; Telles (yellow card) 83'; Montiel (yellow card) 90+5'	Report	Pérez (yellow card) 13'; Cervi (yellow card) 45+2'; Rodríguez 89'; Paciência 90+3'	Stadium: Ramón Sánchez Pizjuán; Attendance: 30,778; Referee: Valentín Pizarro Gómez

17 April 2023 29	Celta Vigo	0–1	Mallorca	Vigo
21:00 CEST (UTC+2)	Mallo (yellow card) 45' (yellow-red card) 90+3'	Report	Ndiaye 21'; Morlanes (yellow card) 61'	Stadium: Balaídos; Attendance: 13,557; Referee: Miguel Ángel Ortiz Arias

22 April 2023 30	Real Madrid	2–0	Celta Vigo	Madrid
21:00 CEST (UTC+2)	Asensio 42'; Ceballos (yellow card) 45+1'; Militão 48'	Report	Vázquez (yellow card) 19'; Galán (yellow card) 76'	Stadium: Santiago Bernabéu; Attendance: 60,386; Referee: Antonio Mateu Lahoz

26 April 2023 31	Celta Vigo	1–0	Elche	Vigo
22:00 CEST (UTC+2)	Aidoo 90'	Report		Stadium: Balaídos; Attendance: 11,344; Referee: Isidro Díaz de Mera Escuderos

30 April 2023 32	Villarreal	3–1	Celta Vigo	Villarreal
16:15 CEST (UTC+2)	Jackson 2', 12'; Capoue (yellow card) 22'; Parejo (penalty missed) 26'; Terrats 70'	Report	Seferovic (yellow card) 25'; Larsen 29'; Vázquez (yellow card) 45+1'; Núñez (yellow card) 49'; Tapia (yellow card) 54'	Stadium: Estadio de la Cerámica; Attendance: 16,123; Referee: Pablo González Fuertes

3 May 2023 33	Getafe	1–0	Celta Vigo	Getafe
22:00 CEST (UTC+2)	Ünal 3' (pen.), (yellow card) 90+2'; Mitrović (yellow card) 7'; Suárez (yellow card) 24'; Arambarri (yellow card) 39'; Djené (yellow card) 60'; Iglesias (yellow card) 70'; Álvarez (yellow card) 79'	Report	Aidoo (yellow card) 21' (yellow-red card) 77'; Galán (yellow card) 39'; De la Torre (yellow card) 62'; Seferovic (yellow card) 87'	Stadium: Coliseum Alfonso Pérez; Attendance: 11,022; Referee: Guillermo Cuadra Fernández

14 May 2023 34	Celta Vigo	1–2	Valencia	Vigo
14:00 CEST (UTC+2)	De la Torre (yellow card) 27'; Veiga (yellow card) 41'; Seferovic 60'; Tapia (yellow card) 86'	Report	Kluivert 8'; Diakhaby (yellow card) 19'; Moriba (yellow card) 72'; Gabriel (yellow card) 74' (yellow-red card) 90+3'; Marí 88'; Almeida (yellow card) 90'	Stadium: Balaídos; Attendance: 14,517; Referee: César Soto Grado

20 May 2023 35	Athletic Bilbao	2–1	Celta Vigo	Bilbao
16:15 CEST (UTC+2)	I. Williams 5'; Paredes (yellow card) 34'; N. Williams (yellow card) 39'; Berenguer 54'; D. García (yellow card) 82'; R. García (yellow card) 90'	Report	Larsen 50'; De la Torre (yellow card) 65'	Stadium: San Mamés; Attendance: 40,759; Referee: Mario Melero López

23 May 2023 36	Celta Vigo	1–1	Girona	Vigo
19:30 CEST (UTC+2)	Pérez 42'	Report	Stuani 59' (pen.)	Stadium: Balaídos; Attendance: 14,117; Referee: Antonio Mateu Lahoz

28 May 2023 37	Cádiz	1–0	Celta Vigo	Cádiz
19:00 CEST (UTC+2)	Lozano (yellow card) 10'; Sobrino (yellow card) 27', (goal) 53'; Bongonda (yellow card) 39'; Hernández (yellow card) 59'; Guardiola (yellow card) 60'; Alcaraz (yellow card) 62'; Alejo (yellow card) 77'; Escalante (yellow card) 90'; San Emeterio (yellow card) 90+5'	Report	Galán (yellow card) 16'; Núñez (yellow card) 45'; De la Torre (yellow card) 48'; Óscar (yellow card) 60'; Solari (yellow card) 63'; Aspas (yellow card) 90+5'	Stadium: Nuevo Mirandilla; Attendance: 19,725; Referee: Ricardo de Burgos Bengoetxea

4 June 2023 38	Celta Vigo	2–1	Barcelona	Vigo
21:00 CEST (UTC+2)	Veiga 42', 65'; Cervi (yellow card) 81'; Tapia (yellow card) 90+6'	Report	Torres (yellow card) 55'; Raphinha (yellow card) 62'; Fati 79'	Stadium: Balaídos; Attendance: 23,365; Referee: Juan Luis Pulido Santana

=== Copa del Rey ===
13 November 2022 First round	Algar	1–6	Celta Vigo	Cartagena
16:00 CET (UTC+1)	Rachiq (yellow card) 12'; Muñoz 15', (yellow card) 22'; Gómez (yellow card) 66'	Report	Cervi 35'; Tapia (yellow card) 46'; Pérez 55'; Óscar 59'; Larsen 62'; Galán 84' (pen.); Vázquez 90+1'	Stadium: Cartagonova; Referee: Dámaso Arcediano Monescillo

22 December 2022 Second round	Gernika	0–3	Celta Vigo	Gernika
19:00 CET (UTC+1)	Marcos (yellow card) 30'	Report	Cervi (yellow card) 24'; Pérez 31'; Beltrán (yellow card) 51'; Aidoo 55'; De la Torre 68'	Stadium: Urbieta; Attendance: 2,857; Referee: Miguel Ángel Ortiz Arias

3 January 2023 Round of 32	Espanyol	3–1 (a.e.t.)	Celta Vigo	Cornellà de Llobregat
19:00 CET (UTC+1)	Martínez (yellow card) 25'; Vinícius (yellow card) 32'; Puado 53'; Vidal (yellow card) 69'; Cabrera (yellow card) 79'; Darder 97'; Melamed (yellow card) 100', (goal) 118'	Report	Vázquez (yellow card) 12'; Paciência 15'; Tapia (yellow card) 27'; Beltrán (yellow card) 51'; Aidoo (yellow card) 64'; Larsen (yellow card) 73'; Marchesín (yellow card) 97' (yellow-red card) 112'; Óscar (yellow card) 120'	Stadium: RCDE Stadium; Attendance: 20,050; Referee: Juan Martínez Munuera

== Statistics ==
=== Squad statistics ===
Last updated on 4 June 2023

No.	Pos	Nat	Player	Total		La Liga		Copa del Rey	
No.	Pos	Nat	Player	Apps	Goals	Apps	Goals	Apps	Goals
Goalkeepers
1	GK	(Argentina) ARG	Agustín Marchesín	20	0	19	0	1	0
13	GK	(Spain) ESP	Iván Villar	21	0	19	0	2	0
Defenders
2	DF	(Spain) ESP	Hugo Mallo	28	0	26	0	0+2	0
3	DF	(Spain) ESP	Óscar Mingueza	23	0	13+8	0	2	0
4	DF	(Spain) ESP	Unai Núñez	39	0	35+1	0	3	0
15	DF	(Ghana) GHA	Joseph Aidoo	37	4	35	3	2	1
17	DF	(Spain) ESP	Javi Galán	40	1	36+1	0	2+1	1
20	DF	(Spain) ESP	Kevin Vázquez	12	1	6+4	0	1+1	1
26	DF	(Spain) ESP	Carlos Domínguez	4	0	1+2	0	1	0
36	DF	(Spain) ESP	Fernando Medrano	1	0	0+1	0	0	0
Midfielders
5	MF	(Spain) ESP	Óscar Rodríguez	36	3	19+14	2	2+1	1
8	MF	(Spain) ESP	Fran Beltrán	39	0	33+3	0	2+1	0
11	MF	(Argentina) ARG	Franco Cervi	39	1	21+15	0	2+1	1
14	MF	(Peru) PER	Renato Tapia	29	0	16+12	0	1	0
19	MF	(Sweden) SWE	Williot Swedberg	7	0	0+4	0	1+2	0
21	MF	(Argentina) ARG	Augusto Solari	12	0	3+9	0	0	0
23	MF	(United States) USA	Luca de la Torre	30	1	16+12	0	1+1	1
24	MF	(Spain) ESP	Gabri Veiga	39	11	28+8	11	2+1	0
37	MF	(Spain) ESP	Hugo Sotelo	1	0	0+1	0	0	0
Forwards
7	FW	(Spain) ESP	Carles Pérez	38	5	23+12	3	3	2
9	FW	(Portugal) POR	Gonçalo Paciência	28	3	5+20	2	3	1
10	FW	(Spain) ESP	Iago Aspas	39	12	31+6	12	0+2	0
18	FW	(Norway) NOR	Jørgen Strand Larsen	35	5	20+12	4	1+2	1
22	FW	(Switzerland) SUI	Haris Seferovic	18	3	10+8	3	0	0
29	FW	(Spain) ESP	Miguel Rodríguez	8	1	3+4	1	0+1	0
35	FW	(Spain) ESP	Pablo Durán	5	0	0+4	0	1	0
Players who have made an appearance this season but have left the club
