= 2021–22 RC Celta de Vigo season =

RC Celta de Vigo
2021–22 season
- President: Carlos Mouriño
- Head coach: Eduardo Coudet
- Stadium: Balaídos
- La Liga: 11th
- Copa del Rey: Round of 32
- Top goalscorer: League: Iago Aspas (18); All: Iago Aspas (18)
- Highest home attendance: 13,146 vs Barcelona (6 November 2021)
- Lowest home attendance: 5,401 vs Atlético Madrid (15 August 2021)
- Biggest win: Getafe 0–3 Celta Vigo
- Biggest defeat: Real Madrid 5–2 Celta Vigo
Home colours	Away colours	Third colours

The 2021–22 season was the 98th season in the existence of RC Celta de Vigo and the club's 10th consecutive season in the top flight of Spanish football. In addition to the domestic league, Celta Vigo participated in this season's edition of the Copa del Rey.

== Players ==
=== First-team squad ===
As of 26 January 2022

Note: Flags indicate national team as defined under FIFA eligibility rules; some limited exceptions apply. Players may hold more than one non-FIFA nationality.

No.	Pos.	Nation	Player
1	GK	ARG	Matías Dituro (on loan from Universidad Católica)
2	DF	ESP	Hugo Mallo (captain)
4	DF	MEX	Néstor Araujo
6	MF	ESP	Denis Suárez
7	FW	BRA	Thiago Galhardo (on loan from Internacional)
8	MF	ESP	Fran Beltrán
9	FW	ESP	Nolito
10	FW	ESP	Iago Aspas (vice-captain)
11	MF	ARG	Franco Cervi
13	GK	ESP	Rubén Blanco

No.	Pos.	Nation	Player
14	MF	PER	Renato Tapia
15	DF	GHA	Joseph Aidoo
17	DF	ESP	Javi Galán
18	MF	MEX	Orbelín Pineda
19	DF	ESP	José Fontán
20	DF	ESP	Kevin
21	MF	ARG	Augusto Solari
22	FW	ESP	Santi Mina
23	MF	ESP	Brais Méndez (3rd captain)
24	DF	COL	Jeison Murillo (on loan from Sampdoria)

=== Reserve team ===
Note: Flags indicate national team as defined under FIFA eligibility rules; some limited exceptions apply. Players may hold more than one non-FIFA nationality.

No.	Pos.	Nation	Player
26	GK	ESP	Gaizka Campos
28	DF	ESP	Carlos Domínguez
29	MF	ESP	Gabri Veiga
32	FW	ESP	Alfon
33	MF	ESP	Hugo Sotelo

No.	Pos.	Nation	Player
34	DF	ESP	Fernando Medrano
35	MF	ESP	Hugo Álvarez
37	GK	ESP	Coke Carrillo (on loan from Barcelona)
38	DF	ESP	Javi Castro (on loan from Alcorcón)
39	DF	FRA	Thomas Carrique

=== Out on loan ===
Note: Flags indicate national team as defined under FIFA eligibility rules; some limited exceptions apply. Players may hold more than one non-FIFA nationality.

No.	Pos.	Nation	Player
—	GK	ESP	Iván Villar (to Leganés until 30 June 2022)
—	DF	ESP	Sergio Carreira (to Mirandés until 30 June 2022)
—	MF	ESP	Miguel Baeza (to Ponferradina until 30 June 2022)

No.	Pos.	Nation	Player
—	MF	TUR	Okay Yokuşlu (to Getafe until 30 June 2022)
—	FW	URU	Gabriel Fernández (to Juárez until 30 June 2022)
—	FW	TUR	Emre Mor (to Fatih Karagümrük until 30 June 2022)

== Transfers ==
=== In ===
Date	Player	From	Type	Fee	Ref
30 June 2021	(Uruguay) Gabriel Fernández	Zaragoza	Loan return		
30 June 2021	(Spain) Juan Hernández	Sabadell	Loan return		
30 June 2021	(Spain) Jozabed	Málaga	Loan return		
30 June 2021	(Turkey) Okay Yokuşlu	(England) West Bromwich Albion	Loan return		

=== Out ===
Date	Player	To	Type	Fee	Ref
20 May 2021	(Spain) Sergio Álvarez	Retired			
30 June 2021	(Spain) Aarón Martín	(Germany) Mainz 05	Loan return		
30 June 2021	(Colombia) Jeison Murillo	(Italy) Sampdoria	Loan return		
30 June 2021	(Spain) Jorge Sáenz	Valencia	Loan return		
1 July 2021	(Spain) Álvaro Vadillo	Espanyol	Buyout clause	€1.8M	

== Pre-season and friendlies ==
Win Draw Loss Fixtures

23 July 2021 Friendly	Celta Vigo	3–0	Atlético Sanluqueño	Marbella, Spain
11:00 CEST (UTC+2)	Mina 14'; Méndez 26'; Aspas 61' (pen.)	Report		Stadium: Marbella Football Center

31 July 2021 Friendly	Celta Vigo	2–0	Pafos FC	Marbella, Spain
11:30 CEST (UTC+2)	Nolito 16'; Mina 35'	Report		Stadium: Marbella Football Center

31 July 2021 Friendly	Bayer Leverkusen	Cancelled	Celta Vigo	Leverkusen, Germany
16:00 CEST (UTC+2)				Stadium: Ulrich-Haberland-Stadion

3 August 2021 Friendly	Celta Vigo	0–0	Gil Vicente	Pontevedra, Spain
18:00 CEST (UTC+2)				Stadium: Cidade Deportiva Afouteza

7 August 2021 Friendly	Wolverhampton Wanderers	0–1	Celta Vigo	Wolverhampton, England
13:45 CEST (UTC+2)		Report	Aspas 31' (pen.)	Stadium: Molineux; Attendance: 16,391; Referee: Jonathan Moss

== Competitions ==
=== Overall record ===
Competition	First match	Last match	Starting round	Final position	Record							
Competition	First match	Last match	Starting round	Final position	Pld	W	D	L	GF	GA	GD	Win %
La Liga	15 August 2021	21 May 2022	Matchday 1	11th	38	12	10	16	43	43	+0	31.58
Copa del Rey	30 November 2021	5 January 2022	First round	Round of 32	3	2	0	1	8	3	+5	66.67
Total					41	14	10	17	51	46	+5	34.15

Source: Soccerway

=== La Liga ===
==== League table ====
Pos	Team	Pld	W	D	L	GF	GA	GD	Pts
9	Valencia	38	11	15	12	48	53	−5	48
10	Osasuna	38	12	11	15	37	51	−14	47
11	Celta Vigo	38	12	10	16	43	43	0	46
12	Rayo Vallecano	38	11	9	18	39	50	−11	42 (Note: Head-to-head points: Rayo Vallecano 9, Elche 7, Espanyol 1.)
13	Elche	38	11	9	18	40	52	−12	42

Source: LaLiga Santander
Rules for classification: 1) Points; 2) Head-to-head points; 3) Head-to-head goal difference; 4) Goal difference; 5) Goals scored; 6) Fair-play points (Note: Head-to-head record is used only after all the matches between the teams in question have been played)

==== Results summary ====
Overall								Home						Away					
Pld	W	D	L	GF	GA	GD	Pts	W	D	L	GF	GA	GD	W	D	L	GF	GA	GD
38	12	10	16	43	43	0	46	7	4	8	26	23	+3	5	6	8	17	20	−3

Source: La Liga

==== Results by round ====
Round	1	2	3	4	5	6	7	8	9	10	11	12	13	14	15	16	17	18	19	20	21	22	23	24	25	26	27	28	29	30	31	32	33	34	35	36	37	38
Ground	H	A	H	A	H	A	H	A	H	A	H	A	H	H	A	H	A	H	A	A	H	A	H	A	H	A	H	A	H	H	A	A	H	A	H	A	H	A
Result	L	D	L	L	L	W	W	L	L	W	L	D	D	D	W	L	D	W	W	L	W	D	W	D	D	L	W	L	D	L	L	W	L	D	W	L	W	L
Position	16	16	18	18	18	17	13	16	15	14	14	15	15	15	13	14	14	14	12	14	12	12	10	10	9	10	10	10	11	11	12	11	12	12	11	11	10	11

Source: La Liga
A = Away; H = Home; W = Win; D = Draw; L = Loss

==== Matches ====
The league fixtures were announced on 30 June 2021.

15 August 2021 1	Celta Vigo	1–2	Atlético Madrid	Vigo
17:30 CEST (UTC+2)	Aspas 59' (pen.), (yellow card) 90+5'; Suárez (yellow card) 77'; Solari (yellow card) 86'; Fontán (yellow card) 90'; Mallo (red card) 90+5'	Report	Lemar (yellow card) 11'; Correa 23', 64'; Llorente (yellow card) 57'; Kondogbia (yellow card) 61'; Carrasco (yellow card) 90+2'; Hermoso (red card) 90+5'; Giménez (yellow card) 90+8'	Stadium: Balaídos; Attendance: 5,401; Referee: José Luis Munuera Montero

23 August 2021 2	Osasuna	0–0	Celta Vigo	Pamplona
22:00 CEST (UTC+2)	Brašanac (yellow card) 33'; R. García (penalty missed) 48'; Oier (yellow card) 51'; Sánchez (yellow card) 77'; Torres (yellow card) 80'	Report	Domínguez (yellow card) 46'; Nolito (yellow card) 51'; Tapia (yellow card) 56'	Stadium: El Sadar; Attendance: 7,189; Referee: Javier Alberola Rojas

28 August 2021 3	Celta Vigo	0–1	Athletic Bilbao	Vigo
17:00 CEST (UTC+2)	Méndez (yellow card) 52'; Mallo (yellow card) 90+6'	Report	I. Williams 34'; Simón (yellow card) 90+6'	Stadium: Balaídos; Attendance: 5,492; Referee: Antonio Mateu Lahoz

12 September 2021 4	Real Madrid	5–2	Celta Vigo	Madrid
21:00 CEST (UTC+2)	Benzema 24', 46', 87' (pen.); Nacho (yellow card) 31'; Vinícius 54', (yellow card) 55'; Camavinga 72'	Report	Mina 4'; Cervi 31'; Murillo (yellow card) 43'; Araujo (yellow card) 62'; Solari (yellow card) 63'	Stadium: Santiago Bernabéu; Attendance: 19,874; Referee: José María Sánchez Martínez

17 September 2021 5	Celta Vigo	1–2	Cádiz	Vigo
21:00 CEST (UTC+2)	Galhardo (yellow card) 49'; Mina 65'; Tapia (yellow card) 74'; Méndez (yellow card) 89'	Report	Lozano 38'; Salvi (penalty missed) 43'; Espino 43'; Sobrino (yellow card) 46'; Haroyan (yellow card) 53'; Alarcón (yellow card) 61'	Stadium: Balaídos; Attendance: 6,754; Referee: Isidro Diaz de Mera Escuderos

21 September 2021 6	Levante	0–2	Celta Vigo	Valencia
22:00 CEST (UTC+2)	Roger (yellow card) 9', (penalty missed) 72'; Miramón (yellow card) 59'; De Frutos (yellow card) 90'	Report	Tapia (yellow card) 4'; Aspas 66'; Méndez 85'	Stadium: Ciutat de València; Attendance: 11,989; Referee: Jorge Figueroa Vázquez

27 September 2021 7	Celta Vigo	1–0	Granada	Vigo
21:00 CEST (UTC+2)	Méndez (yellow card) 12'; Aspas (penalty missed) 73', (yellow card) 90+6'; Suárez 90+4'	Report	Puertas (yellow card) 68'; Duarte (yellow card) 70'; Montoro (yellow card) 85'; Quini (yellow card) 90+6'; Neva (yellow card) 90+6'; Escandell (yellow card) 90+8'; Molina (yellow card) 90+9'	Stadium: Balaídos; Attendance: 6,375; Referee: César Soto Grado

3 October 2021 8	Elche	1–0	Celta Vigo	Elche
14:00 CEST (UTC+2)	Josan (yellow card) 35'; Benedetto 49'; Barragán (yellow card) 58'; Mascarell (yellow card) 89'; Casilla (yellow card) 90+8'	Report	Araujo (yellow card) 72'; Mallo (yellow card) 82'; Mina (yellow card) 90+9'	Stadium: Estadio Manuel Martínez Valero; Attendance: 11,299; Referee: José Luis Munuera Montero

17 October 2021 9	Celta Vigo	0–1	Sevilla	Vigo
16:15 CEST (UTC+2)	Méndez (yellow card) 2'; Aspas (yellow card) 88'	Report	Rakitić (yellow card) 11'; Navas (yellow card) 38'; Mir 54'; Jordán (yellow card) 62'	Stadium: Balaídos; Attendance: 10,774; Referee: Ricardo de Burgos Bengoetxea

25 October 2021 10	Getafe	0–3	Celta Vigo	Getafe
21:00 CEST (UTC+2)	Djené (red card) 63'; Olivera (yellow card) 80'; Suárez (yellow card) 81'; Chema (red card) 81'	Report	Aidoo (yellow card) 42'; Mina 55', 73'; Aspas 58'; Murillo (yellow card) 83'	Stadium: Coliseum Alfonso Pérez; Attendance: 7,630; Referee: Juan Martínez Munuera

28 October 2021 11	Celta Vigo	0–2	Real Sociedad	Vigo
19:00 CEST (UTC+2)	Beltrán (yellow card) 45'	Report	Isak 54'; Elustondo 79'	Stadium: Balaídos; Attendance: 8,726; Referee: Mario Melero López

1 November 2021 12	Rayo Vallecano	0–0	Celta Vigo	Madrid
18:30 CET (UTC+1)	Valentín (yellow card) 65'; Palazón (yellow card) 69'	Report	Galán (yellow card) 45'; Solari (yellow card) 51'; Méndez (yellow card) 69'; Fontán (yellow card) 70'; Tapia (yellow card) 81'	Stadium: Campo de Fútbol de Vallecas; Attendance: 9,580; Referee: Guillermo Cuadra Fernández

6 November 2021 13	Celta Vigo	3–3	Barcelona	Vigo
16:15 CET (UTC+1)	Solari (yellow card) 37'; Aspas 52', 90+6', (yellow card) 90+7'; Tapia (yellow card) 55'; Nolito 74'	Report	Fati 5'; Busquets 18', (yellow card) 88'; García (yellow card) 29'; Depay 34'; Alba (yellow card) 45'; Ter Stegen (yellow card) 90+3'; Ezzalzouli (yellow card) 90+5'; F. de Jong (yellow card) 90+6'	Stadium: Balaídos; Attendance: 13,146; Referee: Alejandro Hernández Hernández

20 November 2021 14	Celta Vigo	1–1	Villarreal	Vigo
14:00 CET (UTC+1)	Mina (yellow card) 17'; Méndez 72'	Report	Moreno 27'; Foyth (yellow card) 45'	Stadium: Balaídos; Attendance: 10,086; Referee: Javier Alberola Rojas

27 November 2021 15	Alavés	1–2	Celta Vigo	Vitoria-Gasteiz
14:00 CET (UTC+1)	Joselu 21'; Duarte (yellow card) 32'; Lejeune (yellow card) 38'; Aguirregabiria (yellow card) 57'	Report	Mina 11'; Méndez (yellow card) 51'; Aspas (penalty missed) 70', 70'; Tapia (yellow card) 85'	Stadium: Mendizorrotza; Attendance: 10,093; Referee: Pablo González Fuertes

5 December 2021 16	Celta Vigo	1–2	Valencia	Vigo
21:00 CET (UTC+1)	Beltrán (yellow card) 9'; Aspas 11', (yellow card) 12'; Nolito (yellow card) 90+6'	Report	Duro 19'; Gómez (yellow card) 36', (goal) 53'; Gayà (yellow card) 51'	Stadium: Balaídos; Attendance: 11,361; Referee: Ricardo de Burgos Bengoetxea

10 December 2021 17	Mallorca	0–0	Celta Vigo	Palma
21:00 CET (UTC+1)	Costa (yellow card) 42'; Rodríguez (yellow card) 80'; Ruiz de Galarreta (yellow card) 82'	Report	Kevin (yellow card) 45+6'; Suárez (yellow card) 90'	Stadium: Visit Mallorca Stadium; Attendance: 10,655; Referee: Isidro Díaz de Mera Escuderos

17 December 2021 18	Celta Vigo	3–1	Espanyol	Vigo
21:00 CET (UTC+1)	Mina 3', (yellow card) 89'; Aspas 47'; Suárez 82'; Mallo (yellow card) 90+1'	Report	Didac (yellow card) 90+1'; Loren 90+2'	Stadium: Balaídos; Attendance: 9,526; Referee: Valentín Pizarro Gómez

2 January 2022 19	Real Betis	0–2	Celta Vigo	Seville
18:30 CET (UTC+1)	Willian José (yellow card) 53'	Report	Suárez (yellow card) 32'; Aspas 36' (pen.), 45+2'; Cervi (yellow card) 90+1'	Stadium: Benito Villamarín; Attendance: 41,656; Referee: César Soto Grado

8 January 2022 20	Real Sociedad	1–0	Celta Vigo	San Sebastián
16:15 CET (UTC+1)	Oyarzabal 13'; Portu (yellow card) 43'; Elustondo (yellow card) 64'; Merino (yellow card) 90+1'	Report	Mina (yellow card) 30'; Aspas (yellow card) 72'	Stadium: Anoeta; Attendance: 27,938; Referee: Guillermo Cuadra Fernández

19 January 2022 21	Celta Vigo	2–0	Osasuna	Vigo
19:00 CET (UTC+1)	Mallo 29'; Galán (yellow card) 31'; Mina 38'	Report	Benito (yellow card) 84'; Vidal (yellow card) 90+2'	Stadium: Balaídos; Attendance: 8,837; Referee: Adrián Cordero Vega

22 January 2022 22	Sevilla	2–2	Celta Vigo	Seville
18:30 CET (UTC+1)	Gómez 71'; Torres 74'; Gudelj (yellow card) 83'	Report	Cervi (yellow card) 23', (goal) 37'; Suárez (yellow card) 31'; Aspas 40'; Tapia (yellow card) 66'; Murillo (yellow card) 76'	Stadium: Ramón Sánchez Pizjuán; Attendance: 30,059; Referee: José María Sánchez Martínez

5 February 2022 23	Celta Vigo	2–0	Rayo Vallecano	Vigo
18:30 CET (UTC+1)	Méndez 12', 80'	Report	Trejo (yellow card) 34'; Ciss (yellow card) 38'	Stadium: Balaídos; Attendance: 12,546; Referee: José Luis Munuera Montero

12 February 2022 24	Cádiz	0–0	Celta Vigo	Cádiz
14:00 CET (UTC+1)	Ledesma (yellow card) 82'; Jønsson (yellow card) 88'; Hernández (yellow card) 90+4'	Report	Cervi (yellow card) 25'; Galán (yellow card) 52'; Mina (penalty missed) 84'	Stadium: Nuevo Mirandilla; Attendance: 15,635; Referee: Antonio Mateu Lahoz

21 February 2022 25	Celta Vigo	1–1	Levante	Vigo
21:00 CET (UTC+1)	Araujo (yellow card) 45'; Cervi (yellow card) 57', (goal) 67'; Aspas (yellow card) 90'	Report	Melero (yellow card) 25'; Cáceres (yellow card) 40'; Cárdenas (yellow card) 55'; Roger 82', (yellow card) 87'; De Frutos (yellow card) 90+2'	Stadium: Balaídos; Attendance: 9,776; Referee: Valentín Pizarro Gómez

26 February 2022 26	Atlético Madrid	2–0	Celta Vigo	Madrid
21:00 CET (UTC+1)	Savić (yellow card) 12'; Giménez (yellow card) 15'; Oblak (yellow card) 20'; Lodi 36', 60'; Mandava (yellow card) 50'	Report	Aspas (yellow card) 17'; Araujo (yellow card) 71'; Galhardo (yellow card) 84'	Stadium: Wanda Metropolitano; Attendance: 48,009; Referee: Alejandro Hernández Hernández

6 March 2022 27	Celta Vigo	4–3	Mallorca	Vigo
18:30 CET (UTC+1)	Beltrán (yellow card) 6'; Galhardo 13'; Suárez 25'; Aspas 61', 90+7' (pen.); Tapia (yellow card) 71'; Mallo (yellow card) 78' (yellow-red card) 86'; Méndez (yellow card) 82'	Report	González 17'; Aidoo 49' (o.g.); Muriqi (yellow card) 66'; Raíllo (yellow card) 80'; Sevilla 87' (pen.); Battaglia (yellow card) 90+3'; Ángel (yellow card) 90+4'; Reina (red card) 90+6'	Stadium: Balaídos; Attendance: 11,320; Referee: Miguel Ángel Ortiz Arias

12 March 2022 28	Villarreal	1–0	Celta Vigo	Villarreal
18:30 CET (UTC+1)	Iborra (yellow card) 34'; Parejo 64'	Report	Galán (yellow card) 90+4'	Stadium: Estadio de la Cerámica; Attendance: 14,929; Referee: Santiago Jaime Latre

20 March 2022 29	Celta Vigo	0–0	Real Betis	Vigo
16:15 CET (UTC+1)	Fontán (yellow card) 90+4'	Report	Carvalho (yellow card) 81'; Pezzella (yellow card) 90'	Stadium: Balaídos; Attendance: 13,149; Referee: Ricardo de Burgos Bengoetxea

2 April 2022 30	Celta Vigo	1–2	Real Madrid	Vigo
18:30 CEST (UTC+2)	Galán (yellow card) 36'; Galhardo (yellow card) 40'; Nolito 53'; Murillo (yellow card) 57'	Report	Benzema 19' (pen.), 69' (pen.), (penalty missed) 64'	Stadium: Balaídos; Attendance: 15,714; Referee: Pablo González Fuertes

10 April 2022 31	Espanyol	1–0	Celta Vigo	Cornellà de Llobregat
16:15 CEST (UTC+2)	Herrera (yellow card) 43'; Calero (yellow card) 45'; Bare (yellow card) 55'; Vilhena (yellow card) 81'; Wu Lei 89'	Report	Kevin (yellow card) 77'	Stadium: RCDE Stadium; Attendance: 18,471; Referee: Javier Alberola Rojas

17 April 2022 32	Athletic Bilbao	0–2	Celta Vigo	Bilbao
18:30 CEST (UTC+2)	Petxarroman (yellow card) 41'; Muniain (yellow card) 62'	Report	Aspas 11'; Beltrán 37'; Kevin (yellow card) 51'; Tapia (yellow card) 90+4'	Stadium: San Mamés; Attendance: 35,541; Referee: Alejandro Hernández Hernández

20 April 2022 33	Celta Vigo	0–2	Getafe	Vigo
20:00 CEST (UTC+2)	Solari (yellow card) 65'; Murillo (yellow card) 74'	Report	Cuenca (yellow card) 9'; Mayoral 23', 52', (yellow card) 38'; Óscar (yellow card) 48'; Florentino (yellow card) 56'; Olivera (yellow card) 64'	Stadium: Balaídos; Attendance: 9,934; Referee: Santiago Jaime Latre

1 May 2022 34	Granada	1–1	Celta Vigo	Granada
16:15 CEST (UTC+2)	Molina (yellow card) 90+1'; Machís 90+2'	Report	Galán (yellow card) 30'; Beltrán (yellow card) 48'; Dituro (yellow card) 53'; Aspas 72'	Stadium: Nuevo Los Cármenes; Attendance: 15,036; Referee: Juan Martínez Munuera

7 May 2022 35	Celta Vigo	4–0	Alavés	Vigo
18:30 CEST (UTC+2)	Galhardo 6'; Aspas 34', 66'; Cervi (yellow card) 42'; Navarro 57' (o.g.)	Report	Loum (yellow card) 24'; Pina (yellow card) 38'; Méndez (yellow card) 53'; Navarro (red card) 64'	Stadium: Balaídos; Attendance: 10,567; Referee: Guillermo Cuadra Fernández

10 May 2022 36	Barcelona	3–1	Celta Vigo	Barcelona
21:30 CEST (UTC+2)	Depay 30'; Aubameyang 41', 48'; García (yellow card) 80'; F. de Jong (yellow card) 90+10'; Alba (yellow card) 90+12'	Report	Aspas 50'; Murillo (red card) 58'	Stadium: Camp Nou; Attendance: 55,899; Referee: Miguel Ángel Ortiz Arias

15 May 2022 37	Celta Vigo	1–0	Elche	Vigo
19:30 CEST (UTC+2)	Suárez 9'; Galán (yellow card) 56'; Tapia (yellow card) 73'	Report	Marcone (yellow card) 81'; Morente (yellow card) 90+3'	Stadium: Balaídos; Attendance: 10,773; Referee: Mario Melero López

21 May 2022 38	Valencia	2–0	Celta Vigo	Valencia
17:30 CEST (UTC+2)	Gómez 28'; Araujo 60' (o.g.); Foulquier (yellow card) 64'; Correia (yellow card) 65'; Moriba (yellow card) 90+5'	Report	Galán (yellow card) 45+1'; Méndez (yellow card) 52'; Galhardo (yellow card) 79'	Stadium: Mestalla; Attendance: 16,189; Referee: Adrián Cordero Vega

=== Copa del Rey ===
30 November 2021 First round	Ebro	0–5	Celta Vigo	Zaragoza
21:00 CET (UTC+1)	Charlez (yellow card) 41'	Report	Mina 32'; Solari 43'; Cervi 55', 58'; Fontán 90+2'	Stadium: La Romareda (Note: Ebro played its game at La Romareda, in Zaragoza instead of their regular stadium La Almozara as it does not meet the requirements established by the Royal Spanish Football Federation.); Referee: Antonio Mateu Lahoz

14 December 2021 Second round	Andorra	1–2 (a.e.t.)	Celta Vigo	Andorra la Vella
19:00 CET (UTC+1)	Vilanova 39'; Vergés (yellow card) 87'; Altimira (yellow card) 120+1'	Report	Fontán 14', (yellow card) 16'; Blanco (yellow card) 40'; Mina 118'	Stadium: Estadi Nacional; Referee: Santiago Jaime Latre

5 January 2022 Round of 32	Atlético Baleares	2–1	Celta Vigo	Palma
20:00 CET (UTC+1)	Martínez 17', 76'; Tanque (yellow card) 88'	Report	Méndez 67'	Stadium: Estadio Balear; Referee: Mario Melero López

== Statistics ==
=== Appearances and goals ===
Last updated on 21 May 2022.

No.	Pos	Nat	Player	Total		La Liga		Copa del Rey	
No.	Pos	Nat	Player	Apps	Goals	Apps	Goals	Apps	Goals
Goalkeepers
1	GK	(Argentina) ARG	Matías Dituro	39	0	38	0	1	0
13	GK	(Spain) ESP	Rubén Blanco	2	0	0	0	2	0
Defenders
2	DF	(Spain) ESP	Hugo Mallo	23	1	21	1	2	0
4	DF	(Mexico) MEX	Néstor Araujo	34	0	29+5	0	0	0
15	DF	(Ghana) GHA	Joseph Aidoo	32	0	30+2	0	0	0
17	DF	(Spain) ESP	David Juncà	39	0	37	0	0+2	0
19	DF	(Spain) ESP	José Fontán	12	2	3+6	0	3	2
20	DF	(Spain) ESP	Kevin Vázquez	19	0	16+1	0	1+1	0
24	DF	(Colombia) COL	Jeison Murillo	22	0	12+7	0	3	0
28	DF	(Spain) ESP	Carlos Domínguez	11	0	3+5	0	3	0
Midfielders
6	MF	(Spain) ESP	Denis Suárez	40	4	33+5	4	2	0
8	MF	(Spain) ESP	Fran Beltrán	39	1	31+6	1	0+2	0
11	MF	(Argentina) ARG	Franco Cervi	36	6	21+12	4	2+1	2
14	MF	(Peru) PER	Renato Tapia	32	0	13+16	0	3	0
18	MF	(Mexico) MEX	Orbelín Pineda	7	0	0+7	0	0	0
21	MF	(Argentina) ARG	Augusto Solari	27	1	4+22	0	1	1
23	MF	(Spain) ESP	Brais Méndez	40	5	36+1	4	0+3	1
29	MF	(Spain) ESP	Gabri Veiga	10	0	0+7	0	2+1	0
33	MF	(Spain) ESP	Hugo Sotelo	1	0	0+1	0	0	0
35	MF	(Spain) ESP	Hugo Álvarez	2	0	0+1	0	1	0
Forwards
7	FW	(Brazil) BRA	Thiago Galhardo	34	2	9+22	2	2+1	0
9	FW	(Spain) ESP	Nolito	35	2	15+17	2	2+1	0
10	FW	(Spain) ESP	Iago Aspas	38	18	36+1	18	0+1	0
22	FW	(Spain) ESP	Santi Mina	36	9	30+3	7	1+2	2
36	FW	(Spain) ESP	Alfon	0	0	0	0	0	0
Players who have made an appearance or had a squad number this season but have left the club
5	MF	(Turkey) TUR	Okay Yokuşlu	9	0	1+7	0	1	0
16	MF	(Spain) ESP	Miguel Baeza	3	0	0+1	0	1+1	0

=== Goalscorers ===
As of 27 November 2021

Rank	Player	La Liga	Copa del Rey	Total
1	(Spain) Iago Aspas	6	0	6
2	(Spain) Santi Mina	5	0	5
3	(Spain) Brais Méndez	2	0	2
4	(Argentina) Franco Cervi	1	0	1
4	(Spain) Denis Suárez	1	0	1
4	(Spain) Nolito	1	0	1
Own goals		0	0	0
Total		16	0	16
