= 2024–25 RC Celta de Vigo season =

Celta Vigo
2024–25 season
- President: Marián Mouriño Terrazo
- Head coach: Claudio Giráldez
- Stadium: Balaídos
- La Liga: 7th
- Copa del Rey: Round of 16
- Top goalscorer: League: Borja Iglesias (11); All: Borja Iglesias (11)
- Average home league attendance: 21,385
Home colours	Away colours	Third colours

The 2024–25 season was the 102nd season in the history of RC Celta de Vigo, and the club's 13th consecutive season in La Liga. In addition to the domestic league, the club participated in the Copa del Rey.

== Players ==
=== First-team squad ===
As of 23 August 2024

Note: Flags indicate national team as defined under FIFA eligibility rules; some limited exceptions apply. Players may hold more than one non-FIFA nationality.

No.	Pos.	Nation	Player
1	GK	ESP	Iván Villar
2	DF	SWE	Carl Starfelt
3	DF	ESP	Óscar Mingueza
4	DF	ESP	Unai Núñez
5	DF	ESP	Sergio Carreira
6	MF	GUI	Ilaix Moriba (on loan from RB Leipzig)
7	FW	ESP	Borja Iglesias (on loan from Betis)
8	MF	ESP	Fran Beltrán
9	FW	GRE	Anastasios Douvikas
10	FW	ESP	Iago Aspas (captain)
11	FW	ARG	Franco Cervi
12	FW	ESP	Alfon
13	GK	ESP	Vicente Guaita
14	MF	USA	Luca de la Torre

No.	Pos.	Nation	Player
15	DF	GHA	Joseph Aidoo
16	MF	BRA	Jailson
17	FW	CIV	Jonathan Bamba
18	FW	ESP	Pablo Durán
19	MF	SWE	Williot Swedberg
20	DF	ESP	Kevin Vázquez
21	DF	SRB	Mihailo Ristić
22	DF	ESP	Javier Manquillo
23	FW	ARG	Tadeo Allende
24	DF	ESP	Carlos Domínguez
25	MF	ESP	Damián Rodríguez
30	FW	ESP	Hugo Álvarez
33	MF	ESP	Hugo Sotelo

== Transfers ==
=== In ===
Pos.	Player	Transferred from	Fee	Date	Source
FW	(Portugal) Gonçalo Paciência	(Germany) VfL Bochum	Loan return	30 June 2024	
DF	(Spain) Unai Núñez	(Spain) Athletic Bilbao	€10,000,000	1 July 2024	
FW	(Spain) Borja Iglesias	(Spain) Real Betis	Loan	19 July 2024	
MF	(Guinea) Ilaix Moriba	(Germany) RB Leipzig	Loan	7 August 2024	
DF	(Spain) Marcos Alonso	(Spain) Barcelona	Free	28 August 2024	

=== Out ===
Pos.	Player	Transferred to	Fee	Date	Source
FW	(Uruguay) Lautaro de León	FC Andorra	End of contract	1 July 2024	
MF	(Peru) Renato Tapia	(Spain) CD Leganés	End of contract	1 July 2024	
FW	(Norway) Jørgen Strand Larsen	(England) Wolverhampton Wanderers	Loan	2 July 2024	
DF	(Spain) José Fontán	(Portugal) Arouca	Undisclosed	3 July 2024	
MF	(Spain) Carlos Dotor	(Spain) Real Oviedo	Loan	21 July 2024	
DF	(Spain) Manu Sánchez	(Spain) Alavés	Loan	23 July 2024	
MF	(Spain) Carles Pérez	(Spain) Getafe	Loan	30 July 2024	
DF	(Spain) Kevin Vázquez	(Spain) Sporting de Gijon	Free	28 August 2024	
DF	(Spain) Unai Nuñez	(Spain) Athletic Bilbao	Loan	28 August 2024	

== Friendlies ==
=== Pre-season ===
13 July 2024 Friendly	Benfica	2–2	Celta Vigo	Águeda, Portugal
19:00 UTC+1	Pavlidis 13' (pen.), 28'		Aspas 70'; Durán 74'	Stadium: Estádio Municipal de Águeda

20 July 2024 Friendly	Vizela	0–4	Celta Vigo	Vilagarcía de Arousa
19:00 UTC+1		Report	Douvikas 2', 22', 39'; Durán 60'	Stadium: Estadio Municipal de A Lomba; Referee: Álvaro Juncal Moreira

23 July 2024 Friendly	Celta Vigo	2-1	Sporting Gijón
12:00	Douvikas 27'; Cervi 87'		Caicedo 8'

26 July 2024 Friendly	Celta Vigo	1-0	Gil Vicente
	Douvikas 72'

3 August 2024 Friendly	Luton Town	1-3	Celta Vigo	Luton
15:00 UTC+1	Doughty 67'		Swedberg 34'; Durán 83'; Aspas 86'	Stadium: Kenilworth Road

10 August 2024 Friendly	West Ham United	2–2 (6–5 p)	Celta Vigo	London, England
15:00 UTC+1	Bowen 6'; Paquetá 35'		Ristić 21'; Durán 66'	Stadium: London Stadium

== Competitions ==
=== Overall record ===
Competition	First match	Last match	Starting round	Final position	Record							
Competition	First match	Last match	Starting round	Final position	Pld	W	D	L	GF	GA	GD	Win %
La Liga	16 August 2024	23–25 May 2025	Matchday 1	7th	38	16	7	15	59	57	+2	42.11
Copa del Rey	30 October 2024	5 January 2025	First round	Round of 16	4	3	0	1	17	8	+9	75.00
Total					42	19	7	16	76	65	+11	45.24

Last updated: 18 May 2025
Source: Soccerway

=== La Liga ===
==== League table ====
Pos	Team	Pld	W	D	L	GF	GA	GD	Pts	Qualification or relegation
5	Villarreal	38	20	10	8	71	51	+20	70 (Note: Athletic Bilbao finished ahead of Villarreal on head-to-head points: Athletic Bilbao 2–0 Villarreal, Villarreal 0–0 Athletic Bilbao.)	Qualification for the Champions League league stage (Note: La Liga gained an additional Champions League place as a result of Spain gaining one of the two European Performance Spots (EPS) awarded to the two associations with the highest UEFA coefficient points in 2024–25.)
6	Real Betis	38	16	12	10	57	50	+7	60	Qualification for the Europa League league stage (Note: The 2024–25 Copa del Rey winner qualified for the Europa League league stage. Since the cup winners (Barcelona) qualified based on league position, the Europa League spot was passed to the seventh-placed team, and the Conference League spot was passed to the eighth-placed team.)
7	Celta Vigo	38	16	7	15	59	57	+2	55	Qualification for the Europa League league stage
8	Rayo Vallecano	38	13	13	12	41	45	−4	52 (Note: Rayo Vallecano finished ahead of Osasuna on head-to-head points: Rayo Vallecano 3–1 Osasuna, Osasuna 1–1 Rayo Vallecano.)	Qualification for the Conference League play-off round
9	Osasuna	38	12	16	10	48	52	−4	52	

Source: LaLiga EA Sports
Rules for classification: 1) Points; 2) Head-to-head points; 3) Head-to-head goal difference; 4) Goal difference; 5) Goals scored; 6) Fair-play points
(Note: Head-to-head record is used only after all the matches between the teams in question have been played)

==== Results summary ====
Overall								Home						Away					
Pld	W	D	L	GF	GA	GD	Pts	W	D	L	GF	GA	GD	W	D	L	GF	GA	GD
38	16	7	15	59	57	+2	55	11	3	5	32	21	+11	5	4	10	27	36	−9

Last updated: 18 May 2025.
Source: La Liga

==== Results by round ====
Round	1	2	3	4	5	6	7	8	9	10	11	12	13	14	15	16	17	18	19	20	21	22	23	24	25	26	27	28	29	30	31	32	33	34	35	36	37	38
Ground	H	H	A	A	H	A	H	H	A	H	A	H	A	H	A	H	A	H	A	H	A	A	H	A	H	A	H	A	H	A	H	A	H	A	H	A	H	A
Result	W	W	L	L	W	L	L	D	W	L	L	W	D	D	L	W	L	W	L	L	D	L	W	D	W	D	W	W	D	W	L	L	W	L	W	W	L	W
Position	1	1	3	8	5	8	10	10	9	10	11	10	11	11	12	10	13	11	12	13	13	13	12	14	10	10	9	8	7	7	7	8	7	7	7	7	7	7

Updated to match(es) played on 18 May 2025. Source: La Liga
A = Away; H = Home; W = Win; D = Draw; L = Loss

==== Matches ====
The league schedule was released on 18 June 2024.

16 August 2024 1	Celta Vigo	2–1	Alavés	Vigo
19:00 CEST (UTC+2)	Aspas (yellow card) 9', (goal) 84'; Claudio Giráldez (yellow card) 61'; Swedberg 66'	Report	Garcia 17'; Conechny (yellow card) 45+2'	Stadium: Balaídos; Attendance: 22,477; Referee: Alejandro Quintero González

23 August 2024 2	Celta Vigo	3–1	Valencia	Vigo
19:00 CEST (UTC+2)	Mingueza 23', (yellow card) 25'; Aspas 28', Beltrán 60'; Damián (yellow card) 78'; Bamba (yellow card) 88'	Report	López 14'	Stadium: Balaídos; Attendance: 23,519; Referee: José Luis Munuera Montero

26 August 2024 3	Villarreal	4–3	Celta Vigo	Villarreal
21:30 CEST (UTC+2)	Cardona 26'; Femenía (yellow card) 55'; Barry 60'; Jailson 64' (o.g.); Albiol (yellow card) 81'; Gueye (yellow card) 85'; Parejo (penalty missed) 90+10', 90+10'; Pépé (yellow card) 90+11'	Report	Iglesias 12'; Mingueza 31'; Moriba (yellow card) 52'; Starfelt 80'; Swedberg (yellow card) 88'; Álvarez (yellow card) 90+8'	Stadium: Estadio de la Cerámica; Attendance: 19,651; Referee: Miguel Ángel Ortiz Arias

1 September 2024 4	Osasuna	3–2	Celta Vigo	Pamplona
17:00	Boyomo 21'; Domínguez 45' (o.g.); Bretones 62'; Lucas Torró (yellow card) 66'; Rubén García (yellow card) 74'	Report	Iglesias 29'; Alfon (red card) 86'; Gómez 90+1' (o.g.)	Stadium: El Sadar; Attendance: 19,908; Referee: Juan Martínez Munuera

15 September 2024 5	Celta Vigo	3–1	Valladolid	Vigo
14:00	Álvarez 22', (yellow card) 41'; Iglesias 35'; Sotelo (yellow card) 61'; Rodríguez (yellow card) 68'; Douvikas 90+1'	Report	Rosa (yellow card) 40'; Chuki (yellow card) 45+2'; Moro 50'; Amallah (yellow card) 55'; Martín (red card) 81'; Jurić (yellow card) 84'; Latasa (yellow card) 87'	Stadium: Balaídos; Attendance: 21,670; Referee: Francisco José Hernández Maeso

22 September 2024 6	Athletic Bilbao	3–1	Celta Vigo	Bilbao
16:15 CEST (UTC+2)	Guruzeta 4', 39'; Berenguer (yellow card) 20'; Paredes (yellow card) 30'; Prados (yellow card) 52'; Djaló 80'	Report	Aspas 25' (pen.); Sotelo (yellow card) 50'; Moriba (yellow card) 86'	Stadium: San Mamés; Attendance: 48,737; Referee: José María Sánchez Martínez

26 September 2024 7	Celta Vigo	0–1	Atlético Madrid	Vigo
21:00 CEST (UTC+2)	Starfelt (yellow card) 33'; Rodríguez (yellow card) 90+2'	Report	Mandava (yellow card) 38'; Giménez (yellow card) 76'; Alvarez 90'	Stadium: Balaídos; Attendance: 21,533; Referee: Víctor García Verdura

29 September 2024 8	Celta Vigo	1–1	Girona	Vigo
14:00 CEST (UTC+2)	Álvarez (yellow card) 78'; Aspas 81'	Report	Herrera 38'	Stadium: Balaídos; Attendance: 21,347; Referee: Ricardo de Burgos Bengoetxea

5 October 2024 9	Las Palmas	0–1	Celta Vigo	Las Palmas
17:30	Fábio Silva (yellow card) 45+1'; Mata (yellow card) 70'; Campaña (yellow card) 82'	Report	Iglesias 28'; Fran Beltrán (yellow card) 32'; Manquillo (yellow card) 42'; Moriba (yellow card) 54' (yellow-red card) 55'; Mingueza (yellow card) 55'; Aspas (yellow card) 55' (yellow-red card) 56'; Douvikas (yellow card) 75'	Stadium: Estadio Gran Canaria; Attendance: 21,482; Referee: Adrián Cordero Vega

19 October 2024 10	Celta Vigo	1–2	Real Madrid	Vigo
21:00 UTC+2	Swedberg 51'; Sotelo (yellow card) 82'	Report	Mbappé 20'; Vinícius 66'; Vázquez (yellow card) 75'	Stadium: ABANCA Balaídos; Attendance: 24,445; Referee: Alejandro Hernández Hernández

27 October 2024 11	Leganés	3–0	Celta Vigo	Leganés
20:00	Diego 59'; Tapia (yellow card) 71'; Neyou (yellow card) 75'; Darko 78'; Sergio 82'	Report	Starfelt (yellow card) 62'; Mingueza (yellow card) 84'	Stadium: Butarque; Attendance: 11,358; Referee: Mario Melero López

5 November 2024 12	Celta Vigo	1–0	Getafe	Vigo
21:00	Douvikas 7', (yellow card) 24'	Report	Nabil (yellow card) 22'; Berrocal (yellow card) 55' (yellow-red card) 65'; Alderete (yellow card) 90+1'	Stadium: Balaídos; Attendance: 19,502; Referee: Jesús Gil Manzano

10 November 2024 13	Real Betis	2–2	Celta Vigo	Seville
14:00 CET (UTC+1)	Cardoso (yellow card) 35'; Vitor Roque 40'; Natan (yellow card) 83'; Juanmi (yellow card) 90+4'; Bartra 90+5'	Report	Rodríguez 13'; Douvikas 82'	Stadium: Benito Villamarín; Attendance: 54,015; Referee: Miguel Ángel Ortiz Arias

23 November 2024 14	Celta Vigo	2–2	Barcelona	Vigo
21:00 CET (UTC+1)	Aspas (yellow card) 45+1'; Rodríguez (yellow card) 60'; Alfon 84'; Álvarez 86'; Sotelo (yellow card) 87'; Moriba (yellow card) 90+3'; Alonso (yellow card) 90+5'	Report	Martín (yellow card) 3'; Raphinha 15'; Lewandowski 61'; Casadó (yellow card) 75' (yellow-red card) 82'; Fort (yellow card) 80'; Fermín (yellow card) 90+1'	Stadium: Abanca-Balaídos; Attendance: 24,573; Referee: César Soto Grado

1 December 2024 15	Espanyol	3–1	Celta Vigo	Barcelona
19:30	Cardona 40'; Cabrera 53'; Kumbulla (yellow card) 55'; Joan García (yellow card) 86'; Cheddira 87'; Manolo González (yellow card) 88'	Report	Alonso (yellow card) 35'; Álvarez (yellow card) 45+1'; Aspas 83' (pen.)	Stadium: RCDE Stadium; Attendance: 23,792; Referee: José María Sánchez Martínez

8 December 2024 16	Celta Vigo	2–0	Mallorca	Vigo
21:00	Álvarez 32'; Javi Rodríguez (yellow card) 44'; Aspas 82'	Report	Antonio Raíllo (red card) 78'	Stadium: Balaídos; Attendance: 22,861; Referee: Ricardo De Burgos Bengoetxea

14 December 2024 17	Sevilla	1–0	Celta Vigo	Seville
18:30 CET (UTC+1)	Agoumé (yellow card) 45'; Bueno 65'; Montiel (yellow card) 83'; Badé (yellow card) 90+3'; Fernández (yellow card) 90+3'; Marcão (yellow card) 90+4'; Benavides (yellow card) 90+5'; Pascual (yellow card) 90+6'	Report	Durán (yellow card) 48'; Starfelt (yellow card) 89'; Alonso (yellow card) 90+3'	Stadium: Ramón Sánchez Pizjuán; Attendance: 37,295; Referee: Jesús Gil Manzano

21 December 2024 18	Celta Vigo	2–0	Real Sociedad	Vigo
16:15	Durán 40', 45+1', (yellow card) 70'; Javi (yellow card) 61'; Starfelt (yellow card) 69'	Report	Oyarzabal (yellow card) 20'; Turrientes (yellow card) 28'; Becker (yellow card) 56'; Zubeldia (yellow card) 71'; Take (yellow card) 83'	Stadium: Balaídos; Attendance: 22,956; Referee: Mateo Busquets Ferrer

10 January 2025 19	Rayo Vallecano	2–1	Celta Vigo	Madrid
21:00 CET (UTC+1)	Embarba 5'; Ciss (yellow card) 21'; Mumin (yellow card) 27'; De Frutos 63'	Report	Iglesias 26'; Alonso (yellow card) 37' (yellow-red card) 90+4'; Cervi (yellow card) 43'	Stadium: Vallecas; Attendance: 12,955; Referee: Guillermo Cuadra Fernández

19 January 2025 20	Celta Vigo	1–2	Athletic Bilbao	Vigo
14:00 CET (UTC+1)	Moriba (yellow card) 60'; Álvarez 74'; Mingueza (red card) 90+6'	Report	Berenguer 62'; Vivian 71'	Stadium: Balaídos; Attendance: 22,279; Referee: Miguel Ángel Ortiz Arias

27 January 2025 21	Alavés	1–1	Celta Vigo	Vitoria-Gasteiz
21:00 CET (UTC+1)	Kike 6' (pen.), (yellow card) 82'; Abqar (yellow card) 78'	Report	M.Alonso (yellow card) 34'; Ristic (yellow card) 64'; Durán 66'; H.Álvarez (yellow card) 81'	Stadium: Mendizorrotza; Attendance: 13,612; Referee: Francisco José Hernández Maeso

2 February 2025 22	Valencia	2–1	Celta Vigo	Valencia
16:15 CET (UTC+1)	Rioja 44'; Barrenechea (yellow card) 67'; Guerra 68'	Report	Durán 65'; Moriba (yellow card) 67'; Starfelt (yellow card) 83'	Stadium: Mestalla; Attendance: 42,273; Referee: Pablo González Fuertes

8 February 2025 23	Celta Vigo	3–2	Real Betis	Vigo
14:00	Beltrán 63', (yellow card) 90+4'; Rodríguez 65'; Alonso (yellow card) 72'; Swedberg 87'; Iglesias (yellow card) 90+4'	Report	Perraud (yellow card) 8'; Antony 10', (yellow card) 68'; Llorente 22', (yellow card) 90+4'; Isco (yellow card) 61'; Vitor Roque (yellow card) 90+4'	Stadium: Balaídos; Attendance: 22,651; Referee: Mateo Busquets Ferrer

24 February 2025 24	Atlético Madrid	1–1	Celta Vigo	Madrid
18:30 CET (UTC+1)	Barrios (red card) 7'; De Paul (yellow card) 65'; Le Normand (yellow card) 67'; Giménez (yellow card) 67'; Sørloth 81'	Report	Domínguez (yellow card) 31'; Durán (yellow card) 47'; Aspas 68' (pen.); Alonso (yellow card) 72'; Losada (yellow card) 80'; Iglesias (yellow card) 90+3'	Stadium: Riyadh Air Metropolitano; Attendance: 64,211; Referee: Juan Martínez Munuera

23 February 2025 25	Celta Vigo	1–0	Osasuna	Vigo
21:00	López (yellow card) 38'; Aspas 69' (pen.)	Report		Stadium: Balaídos; Attendance: 22,005; Referee: José María Sánchez Martínez

1 March 2025 26	Girona	2–2	Celta Vigo	Girona
14:00	Tsygankov 21'; Herrera 68'	Report	Losada 36'; Alonso 51' (pen.)	Stadium: Estadi Montilivi; Attendance: 11,449; Referee: Miguel Ángel Ortiz Arias

8 March 2025 27	Celta Vigo	2–1	Leganés	Vigo
14:00	Mingueza 26', (yellow card) 90+3'; Alfon 46'; Damián (yellow card) 56'; Jailson (yellow card) 70'	Report	Nastasić (yellow card) 9'; Rosier 19'; Sáenz (yellow card) 76'	Stadium: Balaídos; Attendance: 17,326; Referee: Isidro Díaz de Mera Escuderos

15 March 2025 28	Real Valladolid	0–1	Celta Vigo	Valladolid
14:00	Moro (yellow card) 82'; Sylla (yellow card) 90+1'	Report	Alonso (yellow card) 37', (goal) 83' (pen.); Alfon (yellow card) 56'; Minguezan (yellow card) 65'	Stadium: Estadio José Zorrilla; Attendance: 17,521; Referee: Víctor García Verdura

31 March 2025 29	Celta Vigo	1–1	Las Palmas	Vigo
21:00	Alfon 45+2'; Losada (yellow card) 45+5'; Javi (yellow card) 79'; Fer López (yellow card) 83'	Report	Moleiro 48'	Stadium: Balaídos; Attendance: 18,549; Referee: Juan Martínez Munuera

6 April 2025 30	Mallorca	1–2	Celta Vigo	Palma
18:30 CEDT (UTC+2)	Valjent 17'; Rodríguez (yellow card) 41'; Morlanes (yellow card) 45+4'; Copete (yellow card) 53'	Report	Alfon 53'; López 72'	Stadium: Estadi Mallorca Son Moix; Attendance: 18,291; Referee: Francisco José Hernández Maeso

12 April 2025 31	Celta Vigo	0–2	Espanyol	Vigo
18:30	Javi (yellow card) 45+4'; Jailson (yellow card) 65'	Report	Roberto 28', 63'; Lozano (yellow card) 44'; Puado (yellow card) 77'	Stadium: Balaídos; Attendance: 19,801; Referee: Mateo Busquets Ferrer

19 April 2025 32	Barcelona	4–3	Celta Vigo	Barcelona
16:15	F.Torres 13'; Olmo 64'; Raphinha 68', 90+8' (pen.), (yellow card) 90+2'; I.Martínez (yellow card) 90+3'	Report	Iglesias 15', 52', 62'; Aspas (yellow card) 90+2'; Mingueza (yellow card) 90+8'	Stadium: Olímpic Lluís Companys; Attendance: 48,569; Referee: Mario Melero López

23 April 2025 33	Celta Vigo	3–0	Villarreal	Vigo
17:00	Fer López 45'; Beltrán (yellow card) 45+1'; Álvarez (yellow card) 48'; Iglesias 53'; Aspas 87' (pen.)	Report	Bailly (red card) 37'; N.Pépé (yellow card) 85'	Stadium: Balaídos; Attendance: 19,324; Referee: Javier Alberola Rojas

4 May 2025 34	Real Madrid	3–2	Celta Vigo	Madrid
14:00	Güler 33'; Mbappé 39', 48'	Report	Rodríguez 69'; Swedberg 76'	Stadium: Santiago Bernabéu; Attendance: 67,661; Referee: Jesús Gil Manzano

10 May 2025 35	Celta Vigo	3–2	Sevilla	Vigo
16:15 CEST (UTC+2)	Moriba 19'; Alonso (red card) 45+6'; Mingueza 65'; Iglesias 90+1'	Report	Gudelj 45+8' (pen.); Romero (yellow card) 74'; Salas (yellow card) 90+4', (goal) 90+8'	Stadium: Balaídos; Attendance: 20,281; Referee: Pablo González Fuertes

13 May 2025 36	Real Sociedad	0–1	Celta Vigo	San Sebastián
20:00 CEST (UTC+2)	Muñoz (yellow card) 63'; Zubimendi (yellow card) 87'; Sučić (yellow card) 90+6'	Report	Alfon 44'; Moriba (yellow card) 71'	Stadium: Anoeta Stadium; Attendance: 25,124; Referee: Víctor García Verdura

18 May 2025 37	Celta Vigo	1–2	Rayo Vallecano	Vigo
19:00 CEST (UTC+2)	Alonso 10' (pen.), (yellow card) 32'; Lago (yellow card) 68'	Report	Palazón 17'; De Frutos 45+2'; Valentín (yellow card) 57'; Lejeune (yellow card) 68'; Ciss (yellow card) 90+4'	Stadium: Balaídos; Attendance: 21,482; Referee: Juan Luis Pulido Santana

24 May 2025 38	Getafe	1–2	Celta Vigo	Getafe

=== Copa del Rey ===
30 October 2024 First round	UD San Pedro	1–5	Celta Vigo	San Pedro de Alcántara
21:00 UTC+1	Carmona 15'		Alfon 4'; Durán 18'; Allende 41'; Douvikas 61', 83'	Stadium: Antonio Naranjo; Referee: Juan Luis Pulido Santana

3 December 2024 Second round	Salamanca	0–7	Celta Vigo	Villares de la Reina
21:00 UTC+1			Swedberg 5'; Sotelo 36' (pen.); Durán 43'; Allende 65'; Domínguez 69'; López 78', 89'	Stadium: Helmántico; Referee: Adrián Cordero Vega

5 January 2025 Round of 32	Racing Santander	2–3	Celta Vigo	Santander
15:30

16 January 2025 Round of 16	Real Madrid	5–2	Celta Vigo	Madrid
21:00	Mbappé 37' Vinícius 48' Endrick 108', 119' Valverde 112'		Bamba 83' Alonso Mendoza 90+1' (pen.)	Stadium: Santiago Bernabéu Stadium

== Statistics ==
=== Goalscorers ===
Position	Players	La Liga	Copa del Rey	Total
FW	(Spain) Borja Iglesias	11	0	11
FW	(Spain) Iago Aspas	10	0	10
FW	(Spain) Alfon	5	3	8
FW	(Spain) Pablo Duran	4	2	6
FW	(Greece) Anastasios Douvikas	3	2	5
MF	(Sweden) Williot Swedberg	4	1	5
MF	(Spain) Hugo Álvarez	4	0	4
DF	(Spain) Marcos Alonso	3	1	4
MF	(Spain) Fer López	2	2	4
MF	(Spain) Óscar Mingueza	4	0	4
DF	(Spain) Javi Rodríguez	3	0	3
FW	(Argentina) Tadeo Allende	0	2	2
MF	(Spain) Fran Beltrán	2	0	2
FW	(Ivory Coast) Jonathan Bamba	0	1	1
DF	(Spain) Carlos Domínguez	0	1	1
MF	(Spain) Iker Losada	1	0	1
MF	(Guinea) Ilaix Moriba	1	0	1
MF	(Spain) Hugo Sotelo	0	1	1
DF	(Sweden) Carl Starfelt	1	0	1
