= Pablo Durán =

Spanish footballer

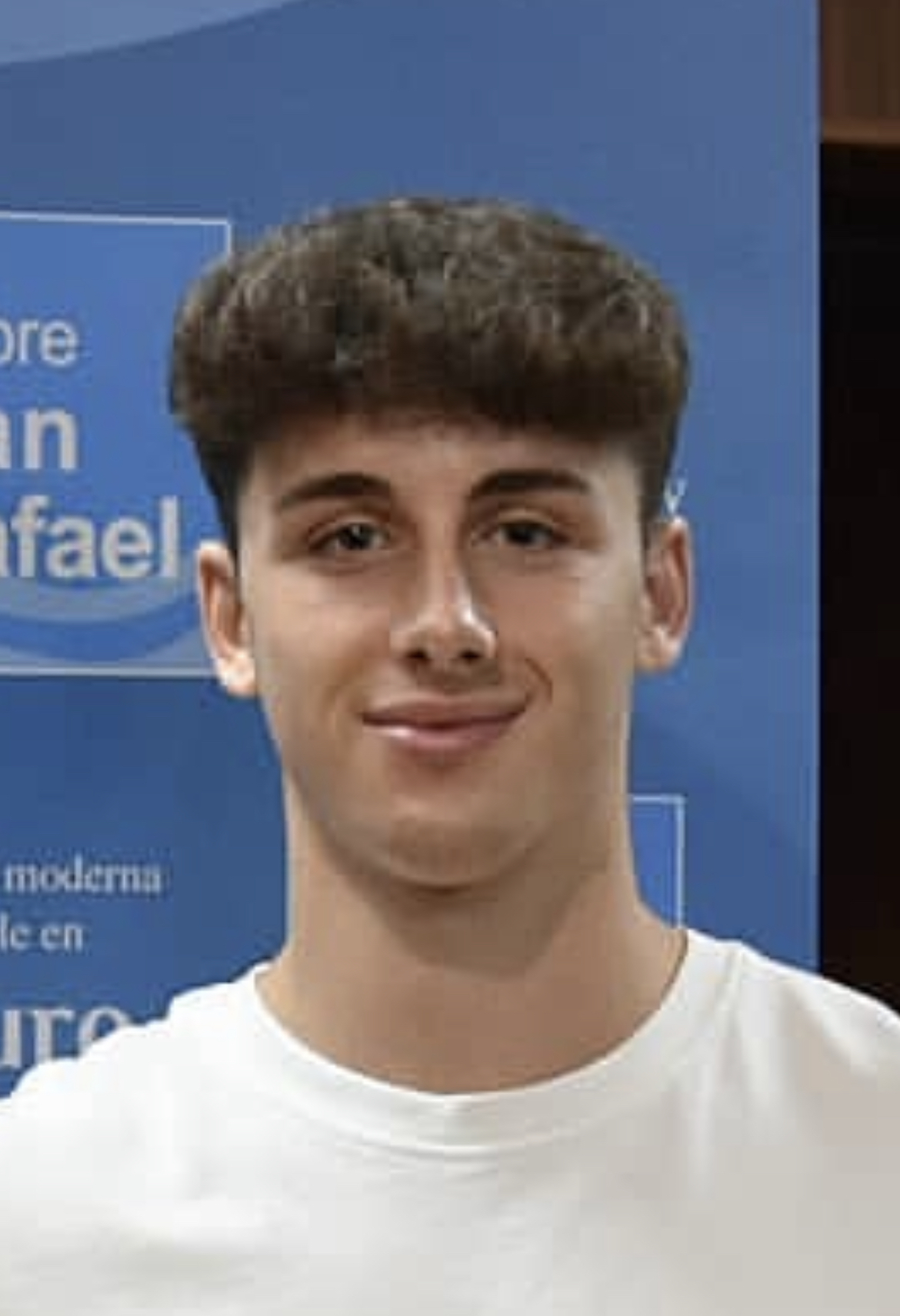

Personal information
- Full name: Pablo Durán Fernández
- Date of birth: 25 May 2001 (age 25)
- Place of birth: Tomiño, Spain
- Height: 1.76 m (5 ft 9 in)
- Position: Forward

Team information
- Current team: Celta
- Number: 11

Youth career
- –2020: Tomiño

Senior career*
Years	Team	Apps	(Gls)
2020–2021	Porriño Industrial	10	(9)
2021–2022	Compostela	32	(8)
2022–2024	Celta B	64	(14)
2022–	Celta	62	(7)
- * Club domestic league appearances and goals as of 27 May 2026

Pablo Durán Fernández (born 25 May 2001) is a Spanish professional footballer who plays for La Liga club Celta de Vigo. Mainly a forward, he can also play as a winger.

== Club career ==
Born in Tomiño, Pontevedra, Galicia, Durán is a youth product of his hometown club AD Tomiño. In 2020, after finishing his formation, he was offered to four Preferente de Galicia clubs, which turned him down, before joining Porriño Industrial FC initially on a trial period; he subsequently signed for the club and scored nine goals in ten appearances during the 2020–21 season.

On 5 July 2021, Durán moved straight to Segunda División RFEF after signing a two-year contract with SD Compostela. He was regularly used at Compos during the campaign, scoring eight goals in 32 matches and being named their player of the season.

On 8 August 2022, Compostela announced the transfer of Durán to La Liga side RC Celta de Vigo; he signed a five-year contract with the club the following day, and was initially assigned to the reserves in Primera Federación. He made his first team – and La Liga – debut on 29 October, coming on as a late substitute for Javi Galán in a 3–1 away loss to UD Almería.

== Career statistics ==
=== Club ===
As of match played 23 May 2026

Appearances and goals by club, season and competition
Club	Season	League			Cup		Europe		Other		Total	
Club	Season	Division	Apps	Goals	Apps	Goals	Apps	Goals	Apps	Goals	Apps	Goals
Porriño Industrial	2020–21	Preferente de Galicia	10	9	—		—		—		10	9
Compostela	2021–22	Segunda División RFEF	32	8	—		—		—		32	8
Celta Fortuna	2022–23	Primera Federación	27	2	—		—		2 (Note: Appearances in 2023 Primera Federación play-offs)	0	29	2
Celta Fortuna	2023–24	Primera Federación	37	12	—		—		2 (Note: Appearances in 2024 Primera Federación play-offs)	0	39	12
Celta Fortuna	Total		64	14	0	0	—		4	0	68	14
Celta	2022–23	La Liga	4	0	1	0	—		—		5	0
Celta	2024–25	La Liga	27	4	4	2	—		—		31	6
Celta	2025–26	La Liga	30	2	1	0	9 (Note: Appearances in UEFA Europa League)	3	—		40	5
Celta	Total		61	6	6	2	9	3	—		76	11
Career total			167	37	6	2	9	3	4	0	186	42
