= Joseph Aidoo (Ghanaian footballer) =

Ghanaian footballer (born 1995)

Personal information
- Full name: Joseph Aidoo
- Date of birth: 29 September 1995 (age 31)
- Place of birth: Tema, Ghana
- Height: 1.84 m (6 ft 0 in)
- Position: Centre-back

Senior career*
Years	Team	Apps	(Gls)
2013–2015	Inter Allies	17	(0)
2015	→ Hammarby IF (loan)	1	(0)
2016–2017	Hammarby IF	26	(1)
2017–2019	Genk	65	(4)
2019–2026	Celta	139	(3)
2025	→ Valladolid (loan)	8	(0)

International career^{‡}
2015	Ghana U20	10	(0)
2019–	Ghana	17	(0)
Medal record
Men's football
Representing Ghana
African U-20 Championship
Bronze medal – third place	2015 Senegal
- * Club domestic league appearances and goals as of 27 May 2026 ‡ National team caps and goals as of 23 November 2024 (UTC)

Joseph Aidoo (born 29 September 1995) is a Ghanaian professional footballer who plays as a centre-back for the Ghana national team.

== Club career ==
=== Inter Allies ===
He started his professional football career at Inter Allies in the First Capital Plus Premier League. In 2013–14, Aidoo was nominated in the category Defender of the year in the domestic top tier, but eventually missed out on the award. Aidoo was the club captain during the season of 2014–15.

=== Hammarby IF ===
In August 2015, Swedish club Hammarby IF in Allsvenskan signed Aidoo on a six-month loan deal. He made his debut, and his only appearance during the 2015 season, against then reigning champions Malmö FF on 25 October 2015. Even though Hammarby lost with a score of 0–1, Aidoo put on an impressive performance being voted Hammarby player of the game.

Before the 2016 Allsvenskan season, he signed for Hammarby IF permanently on a three-year deal. He made his first league appearance of the season against Malmö FF on 18 May, playing the first half before being substituted at halftime. Mid through the campaign, manager Nanne Bergstrand chose to swap the two central defenders, with Aidoo and newly signed David Boo Wiklander making their entrances as regular starters. Out of the following 11 games, Hammarby won an impressive seven – also keeping a clean sheet in six consecutive away fixtures. Aidoo scored his first competitive goal for Hammarby on 12 September 2016, in a 1–1 draw against Örebro SK on home turf.

Aidoo started the 2017 season in fine form, with Hammarby only conceding five goals in the six league games. Aidoo's performances led to him being named in April's best eleven for African players over the world, in the magazine Goal.

=== Genk ===
On 24 July 2017, Aidoo completed a transfer to Genk in the Belgian First Division A. He signed a three-year contract with the club, with an option for a further. The transfer fee was reportedly set between €1.25 million and €2 million. He made his debut for the side on 26 August, coming on as a late substitute, in a 1–0 home win against Mechelen. Aidoo scored his first goal for Genk in a 1–0 win against the domestic giants Anderlecht on 22 October, and was also voted as the "man of the match". Between 23 September and 19 November, Genk went on an eight matches long unbeaten streak (five wins and three draws) in the league, with Aidoo starting all of the fixtures.

=== Celta ===
On 11 July 2019, Aidoo agreed to a five-year contract with Spanish La Liga side RC Celta de Vigo for a reported fee of €8 million. His former club Hammarby received €380,000 as part of the deal.

He made his debut for the Galician club on 24 August 2019 in a 1–0 home win against Valencia, starting and playing 90 minutes at center-back.

On 30 January 2025, Aidoo moved on loan to Valladolid.

== International career ==
Aidoo featured in the 2015 FIFA U-20 World Cup for Ghana. He played all four of his side's fixtures, with Ghana eventually getting eliminated by Mali in the quarter finals. He was also called up to the African U-20 Championship earlier the same year, where Ghana finished in third place.

He made his debut for the Ghana national football team on 26 March 2019 in a friendly against Mauritania.

== Career statistics ==
=== Club ===
As of match played 12 April 2026

Appearances and goals by club, season and competition
Club	Season	League			National Cup		Continental		Other		Total	
Club	Season	Division	Apps	Goals	Apps	Goals	Apps	Goals	Apps	Goals	Apps	Goals
Hammarby IF (loan)	2015	Allsvenskan	1	0	0	0	—		—		1	0
Hammarby IF	2016	Allsvenskan	14	1	0	0	—		—		14	1
Hammarby IF	2017	Allsvenskan	12	0	3	0	—		—		12	3
Hammarby IF	Total		27	1	3	0	0	0	0	0	30	1
Genk	2017–18	Belgian First Division A	32	3	4	0	6 (Note: Appearance(s) in UEFA Europa League)	1	1 (Note: Appearance(s) in Uefa Playoffs)	0	43	4
Genk	2018–19	Belgian First Division A	33	1	2	0	—		—		35	1
Genk	Total		65	4	6	0	6	1	1	0	78	5
Celta	2019–20	La Liga	32	0	1	0	—		—		33	0
Celta	2020–21	La Liga	25	0	2	0	—		—		28	0
Celta	2021–22	La Liga	32	0	0	0	—		—		32	0
Celta	2022–23	La Liga	35	3	2	1	—		—		37	4
Celta	2023–24	La Liga	6	0	0	0	—		—		6	0
Celta	2024–25	La Liga	1	0	2	0	—		—		3	0
Celta	2024–25	La Liga	8	0	2	0	2 (Note: Appearances in UEFA Europa League)	0	—		12	0
Celta	Total		139	3	9	1	2	0	0	0	151	4
Valladolid (loan)	2024–25	La Liga	8	0	—		—		—		8	0
Career total			181	6	16	0	8	1	1	0	206	7

=== International ===
As of matches played on 27 March 2023

Appearances and goals by national team and year
National team	Year	Apps	Goals
Ghana
Ghana	2019	5	0
Ghana	2020	3	0
Ghana	2021	2	0
Ghana	2022	1	0
Ghana	2023	6	0
Total		17	0

== Honours ==
Genk

- Belgian First Division A: 2018–19
