= Fran Beltrán =

Spanish footballer (born 1999)

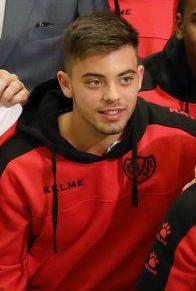
- Beltrán with Rayo Vallecano in 2018

Personal information
- Full name: Francisco José Beltrán Peinado
- Date of birth: 3 February 1999 (age 27)
- Place of birth: Madrid, Spain
- Height: 1.70 m (5 ft 7 in)
- Position: Midfielder

Team information
- Current team: Girona
- Number: 8

Youth career
- 2007–2013: Getafe
- 2013–2016: Rayo Vallecano

Senior career*
Years	Team	Apps	(Gls)
2015–2016	Rayo Vallecano B	23	(0)
2016–2018	Rayo Vallecano	71	(1)
2018–2026	Celta	240	(8)
2026–	Girona	28	(2)

International career
2016	Spain U17	2	(0)
2017	Spain U18	2	(0)
2016–2018	Spain U19	9	(0)
2018–2021	Spain U21	14	(0)
2021	Spain	1	(0)
- * Club domestic league appearances and goals as of 14:02, 4 November 2026 (UTC)

Francisco José Beltrán Peinado (born 3 February 1999) is a Spanish professional footballer who plays as a central midfielder for Segunda División club Girona.

== Club career ==
=== Rayo Vallecano ===
Born in Madrid, Beltrán joined Rayo Vallecano's youth system in 2013 from Getafe CF. He made his senior debut with the former's reserves on 13 December 2015 at the age of just 16, starting in a 1–1 Tercera División home draw against CD San Fernando de Henares.

Beltrán was a regular for the first team during the 2016 pre-season, being the most utilised player by manager José Ramón Sandoval. He made his professional debut on 20 August, playing the full 90 minutes in a 2–1 away loss to Elche CF in the Segunda División.

Beltrán scored his first goal as a professional on 29 October 2016, his team's first in a 3–2 defeat at CD Tenerife. An undisputed starter during the 2017–18 season, he contributed 40 appearances as his side returned to La Liga as champions.

=== Celta ===
On 1 August 2018, Beltrán signed a five-year contract with top-flight club RC Celta de Vigo, for a reported fee of €8 million. He played his first league match on 18 August, starting in a 1–1 home draw with RCD Espanyol, and on 7 January 2019 he scored his first such goal to equalise in a 2–1 loss to Athletic Bilbao also at Balaídos Stadium.

Beltrán was sent off in the 25th minute of a 2–0 home loss against Granada CF on 15 September 2019 for a foul on Yangel Herrera that was confirmed by video assistant referee review; teammate Jorge Sáenz had already been ejected through the same technology.

During his tenure at Celta, Beltrán totalled 263 games, eight goals and three assists.

=== Girona ===
On 20 January 2026, Beltrán joined Girona FC on a deal until June 2030; Celta remained entitled to 15% of any future transfers. He scored his first goal on 16 February, helping the hosts to defeat second-placed FC Barcelona 2–1.

== International career ==
Beltrán won caps for Spain at under-17, under-18, under-19 and under-21 levels. He made his debut for the latter age group on 14 November 2018, playing 20 minutes of a 4–1 friendly win over Denmark in Logroño.

Due to the isolation of some national team players following the positive COVID-19 test of Sergio Busquets, Spain's under-21 squad were called up for the international friendly against Lithuania on 8 June 2021. Beltrán's first senior appearance took place in that match, a 4–0 victory in Leganés.

== Career statistics ==
=== Club ===
As of 31 October 2026

Appearances and goals by club, season and competition
Club	Season	League			Cup		Europe		Other		Total	
Club	Season	Division	Apps	Goals	Apps	Goals	Apps	Goals	Apps	Goals	Apps	Goals
Rayo Vallecano B	2015–16	Tercera División	23	0	—		—		—		23	0
Rayo Vallecano	2016–17	Segunda División	31	1	2	0	—		—		33	1
Rayo Vallecano	2017–18	Segunda División	40	0	1	0	—		—		41	0
Rayo Vallecano	Total		71	1	3	0	—		—		74	1
Celta	2018–19	La Liga	30	1	2	0	—		—		32	1
Celta	2019–20	La Liga	28	1	2	0	—		—		30	1
Celta	2020–21	La Liga	32	3	2	0	—		—		34	3
Celta	2021–22	La Liga	37	1	2	0	—		—		39	1
Celta	2022–23	La Liga	36	0	3	0	—		—		39	0
Celta	2023–24	La Liga	33	0	4	0	—		—		37	0
Celta	2024–25	La Liga	34	2	3	0	—		—		37	2
Celta	2025–26	La Liga	10	0	1	0	4 (Note: Appearances in UEFA Europa League)	0	—		15	0
Celta	Total		240	8	19	0	4	0	—		263	8
Girona	2025–26	La Liga	17	1	—		—		—		17	1
Girona	2026–27	Segunda División	11	1	0	0	—		—		11	1
Girona	Total		28	2	0	0	—		—		28	2
Career total			362	11	22	0	4	0	0	0	388	11

=== International ===
Appearances and goals by national team and year
National team	Year	Apps	Goals
Spain	2021	1	0
Total		1	0

== Honours ==
Rayo Vallecano

- Segunda División: 2017–18
