= Javi Galán =

Spanish footballer (born 1994)

Personal information
- Full name: Javier Galán Gil
- Date of birth: 19 November 1994 (age 31)
- Place of birth: Badajoz, Spain
- Height: 1.72 m (5 ft 8 in)
- Positions: Left-back; left wing-back; left winger

Team information
- Current team: Celta
- Number: 22

Youth career
- San Roque Badajoz
- –2012: Don Bosco
- 2012–2013: Flecha Negra

Senior career*
Years	Team	Apps	(Gls)
2013–2015	Badajoz	62	(6)
2015–2017	Córdoba B	56	(7)
2016–2019	Córdoba	77	(4)
2019–2021	Huesca	81	(2)
2021–2023	Celta	74	(0)
2023–2025	Atlético Madrid	35	(0)
2024	→ Real Sociedad (loan)	14	(0)
2025–2026	Osasuna	20	(0)
2026–	Celta	0	(0)
- * Club domestic league appearances and goals as of 17 June 2026

Javier Galán Gil (born 19 November 1994) is a Spanish professional footballer who plays a left-back, left wing-back or left winger for La Liga club Celta.

== Career ==
=== Early career ===
Born in Badajoz, Extremadura, Galán represented CD San Roque Badajoz, CP Don Bosco and CP Flecha Negra as a youth. On 20 June 2013, after scoring 12 goals for the latter's Juvenil A squad, he moved to CD Badajoz.

Galán made his senior debut on 15 September 2013, playing the last 30 minutes in a 1–0 home win against CD Solana for the Regional Preferente championship. He scored his first senior goal fourteen days later, netting the last in a 4–1 home routing of EF Emérita Augusta.

Galán helped the Blanquinegros in their promotion to Tercera División during his first campaign.

=== Córdoba ===
On 9 July 2015, Galán joined Córdoba CF, being assigned to the reserves also in the fourth tier. Upon arriving, he became an immediate first choice for the B's.

Galán made his professional debut on 12 October 2016, starting as a left back in a 2–1 Copa del Rey away win against Cádiz CF. He made his Segunda División debut on 4 December, starting in a 2–1 win at CF Reus Deportiu.

On 12 December 2016, Galán renewed his contract until 2020. Five days later he scored his first professional goal, netting the first in a 2–1 win at Real Oviedo.

Galán was an undisputed starter during the 2017–18 campaign; converted to a left back by manager Jorge Romero, he went on to score two goals in 40 appearances as his side narrowly avoided relegation.

=== Huesca ===
On 29 January 2019, Galan moved to La Liga side SD Huesca on a three-and-a-half-year contract. He made his debut in the top tier on 1 February, starting in a 4–0 home routing of Real Valladolid.

Galán immediately became a regular starter for the side, suffering relegation in his first season but immediately bouncing back as champions in his second. He scored his first goal in the top tier on 6 February 2021, netting the opener in a 1–2 home loss to Real Madrid.

=== Celta ===
On 31 July 2021, after suffering another relegation with Huesca, Galán signed a five-year contract with Celta de Vigo in the top tier.

=== Atlético Madrid ===
On 3 July 2023, Galán signed a contract until June 2026 with fellow La Liga club Atlético Madrid.

==== Real Sociedad (loan) ====
On 24 January 2024, Atlético Madrid sent Galán on loan to fellow La Liga club Real Sociedad until the end of the 2023–24 season.

=== Osasuna ===
On 24 December 2025, Galán joined fellow La Liga club Osasuna, signing a contract until the end of the 2025–26 season, for a fee of €500.000, which could rise to €1 million in case of a contract extension.

=== Return to Celta ===
On 30 June 2026, Galán returned to Celta, joining on a two-year contract.

== Personal life ==
Galán is physically likened to England international forward Wayne Rooney, with his nickname being Rooney during his youth career and Badajoz.

== Career statistics ==
As of match played 17 December 2025

Appearances and goals by club, season and competition
Club	Season	League			Copa del Rey		Europe		Other		Total	
Club	Season	Division	Apps	Goals	Apps	Goals	Apps	Goals	Apps	Goals	Apps	Goals
Badajoz	2013–14	Segunda División B	34	2	—		—		—		34	2
Badajoz	2014–15	Segunda División B	28	3	—		—		—		28	3
Badajoz	Total		62	5	—		—		—		62	5
Córdoba B	2015–16	Segunda División B	34	7	—		—		—		34	7
Córdoba B	2016–17	Segunda División B	22	0	—		—		—		22	0
Córdoba B	Total		56	7	—		—		—		56	7
Córdoba	2016–17	Segunda División	17	2	4	0	—		—		21	2
Córdoba	2017–18	Segunda División	40	2	1	0	—		—		41	2
Córdoba	2018–19	Segunda División	20	0	2	1	—		—		22	1
Córdoba	Total		77	4	7	1	—		—		84	5
Huesca	2018–19	La Liga	16	0	—		—		—		16	0
Huesca	2019–20	Segunda División	28	1	2	0	—		—		30	1
Huesca	2020–21	La Liga	37	1	0	0	—		—		37	1
Huesca	Total		81	2	2	0	—		—		83	2
Celta Vigo	2021–22	La Liga	37	0	2	0	—		—		39	0
Celta Vigo	2022–23	La Liga	37	0	3	1	—		—		40	1
Celta Vigo	Total		74	0	5	1	—		—		79	1
Atlético Madrid	2023–24	La Liga	5	0	1	0	2 (Note: Appearance(s) in UEFA Champions League)	0	1 (Note: Appearance in Supercopa de España)	0	9	0
Atlético Madrid	2024–25	La Liga	25	0	6	0	6	0	3 (Note: Appearances in FIFA Club World Cup)	0	40	0
Atlético Madrid	2025–26	La Liga	5	0	1	0	1	0	—		7	0
Atlético Madrid	Total		35	0	8	0	9	0	4	0	56	0
Real Sociedad (loan)	2023–24	La Liga	14	0	2	0	2	0	—		18	0
Career total			399	18	24	2	11	0	4	0	438	20

== Honours ==
Huesca

- Segunda División: 2019–20
