= 2024 Primera Federación play-offs =

The 2024 Primera Federación play-offs (Playoffs de Ascenso or Promoción de Ascenso) are the final play-offs for promotion from 2023–24 Primera Federación to the 2024–25 Segunda División.

== Format ==
Teams ranked second through fifth in each of the two groups will qualify for the promotion play-off, which will determine the last two promotion spots. The eight qualified teams will be drawn into two fixed brackets, each of which will contain the second and fifth-place finishers from one group and the third and fourth-place finishers from the other. All ties will consist of a two-legged knockout series. In case of draws, an overtime period will be played; if the match is still tied following the overtime, the team which achieved a higher regular season finish will be proclaimed the winner.

Starting with the 2022–23 season, the RFEF recovered the two-legged knockout system, due to the complaints filed against the single knockout system at a neutral venue that had been implemented after COVID-19 and the subsequent reform of the football leagues organized by the RFEF.

=== Bracket ===
Semi–finals (1–2 and 8–9 June)
5B	Ceuta	2	1	3
2A	Gimnàstic	2	2	4
4A	Celta Fortuna	2	1	3
3B	Málaga	2	2	4

Finals (16 and 22 June)
2A	Gimnàstic	1	2	3
3B	Málaga	2	2	4

Semi–finals (2 and 8–9 June)
5A	Ponferradina	0	1	1
2B	Córdoba	1	2	3
4B	Ibiza	1	3	4
3A	Barcelona Atlètic	2	5	7

Finals (16 and 23 June)
2B	Córdoba	1	2	3
3A	Barcelona Atlètic	1	1	2

=== First round ===
==== Qualified teams ====
Group	Position	Team
1	2nd	Gimnàstic
2	2nd	Córdoba

Group	Position	Team
1	3rd	Barcelona Atlètic
2	3rd	Málaga

Group	Position	Team
1	4th	Celta Fortuna
2	4th	Ibiza

Group	Position	Team
1	5th	Ponferradina
2	5th	Ceuta

==== Matches ====
===== Semi-finals =====
Team 1	Agg.	Team 2	1st leg	2nd leg
Gimnàstic	4–3	Ceuta	2–2	2–1
Málaga	4–3	Celta Fortuna	2–2	2–1
Córdoba	3–1	Ponferradina	1–0	2–1
Barcelona Atlètic	7–4	Ibiza	2–1	5–3

First leg

1 June 2024	Celta Fortuna	2–2	Málaga	Vigo
18:30 UTC+2	Alfon 15'; Durán 90+3'		Genaro 48'; Roberto 61' (pen.)	Stadium: Estadio Municipal de Balaídos; Referee: Bestard Servera

2 June 2024	Ponferradina	0–1	Córdoba	Ponferrada
17:00 UTC+2			Albarrán 49'	Stadium: Estadio El Toralín; Referee: David López Jiménez

2 June 2024	Ibiza	1–2	Barcelona Atlètic	Ibiza
19:15 UTC+2	Omoigui 11'		Víctor 14'; Guiu 55'	Stadium: Estadi Municipal de Can Misses; Attendance: 4,500; Referee: Sánchez Villalobos

2 June 2024	Ceuta	2–2	Gimnàstic	Ceuta
21:15 UTC+2	Rodri 9', 67'		Godoy 50'; Gorostidi 90+1'	Stadium: Estadio Alfonso Murube; Referee: Perez Hernández

Second leg

8 June 2024	Barcelona Atlètic	5–3 (7–4 agg.)	Ibiza	Sant Joan Despí
19:30 UTC+2	Guiu 45+2'; Víctor 52'; Hernández 58', 60', 62'		Escassi 19', 44'; Díez 66'	Stadium: Estadi Johan Cruyff; Attendance: 4,667; Referee: Huerta de Aza

8 June 2024	Málaga	2–1 (4–3 agg.)	Celta Fortuna	Málaga
19:30 UTC+2	Roberto 59', 88'		Alfon 16'	Stadium: Estadio La Rosaleda; Referee: Muñiz Muñoz

9 June 2024	Gimnàstic	2–1 (4–3 agg.)	Ceuta	Tarragona
19:45 UTC+2	Godoy 22'; Martínez 45'		Rodri 66'	Stadium: Nou Estadi Costa Daurada; Referee: Guillermo Conejero Sánchez

9 June 2024	Córdoba	2–1 (3–1 agg.)	Ponferradina	Córdoba
20:00 UTC+2	Casas 5'; Kike 90+1' (pen.)		Valle 62'	Stadium: Estadio Nuevo Arcángel; Attendance: 21,245; Referee: Juan Antonio Campos Salinas

=== Second round ===
==== Qualified teams ====
Group	Position	Team
1	2nd	Gimnàstic
2	2nd	Córdoba

Group	Position	Team
1	3rd	Barcelona Atlètic
2	3rd	Málaga

==== Matches ====
===== Finals =====
Team 1	Agg.	Team 2	1st leg	2nd leg
Gimnàstic	3–4 (a.e.t.)	Málaga	1–2	2–2 (a.e.t.)
Córdoba	3–2	Barcelona Atlètic	1–1	2–1

First leg

15 June 2024	Málaga	2–1	Gimnàstic	Málaga
20:30 UTC+2	Roberto 45+2', 58' (pen.)	Report	Concha 47'	Stadium: Estadio La Rosaleda; Attendance: 29,103; Referee: Palencia Caballero

16 June 2024	Barcelona Atlètic	1–1	Córdoba	Sant Joan Despí
20:00 UTC+2	Román 87'	Report	Toril 8'	Stadium: Estadi Johan Cruyff; Attendance: 5,141; Referee: Ramo Andrés

Second leg

22 June 2024	Gimnàstic	2–2 (a.e.t.) (3–4 agg.)	Málaga	Tarragona
21:30 UTC+2	Godoy 72'; Santamaría 93'; Concha (red card) 120+2'	Report	Dioni 108'; Antoñito 120+1'	Stadium: Nou Estadi Costa Daurada; Referee: Mallo Fernández

23 June 2024	Córdoba	2–1 (3–2 agg.)	Barcelona Atlètic	Córdoba
20:00 UTC+2	Toril 34', 55'	Report	Fort 14'	Stadium: Estadio Nuevo Arcángel; Referee: Muresan Muresan

== Promoted teams ==
- The two teams that were promoted to Segunda División through regular season groups and the two play–off winners are included.

Promoted to Segunda División
Castellón (3 years later)	Deportivo La Coruña (4 years later)	Málaga (1 year later)	Córdoba (5 years later)
