= Hugo Sotelo =

Spanish footballer

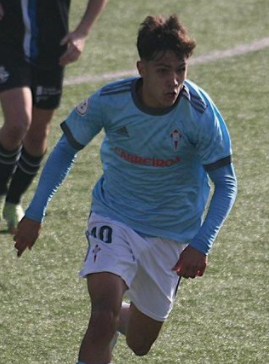
- Sotelo with Celta in 2021

Personal information
- Full name: Hugo Sotelo Gómez
- Date of birth: 19 December 2003 (age 22)
- Place of birth: Vigo, Spain
- Height: 1.80 m (5 ft 11 in)
- Position: Central midfielder

Team information
- Current team: Levante (on loan from Celta)

Youth career
- 2011–2021: Celta

Senior career*
Years	Team	Apps	(Gls)
2021–	Celta	64	(0)
2022–2023	Celta B	28	(1)
2026–	→ Levante (loan)	0	(0)

International career^{‡}
2024–	Spain U21	14	(0)
2024	Galicia	1	(0)
- * Club domestic league appearances and goals as of 27 May 2026 ‡ National team caps and goals as of 14:25, 26 May 2025 (UTC)

Hugo Sotelo Gómez (born 19 December 2003) is a Spanish professional footballer who plays as a central midfielder for La Liga club Levante, on loan from Celta de Vigo.

== Career ==
A youth product of the Celta Vigo academy, Sotelo was called up to join the senior team for the first time in early May 2021 due to a series of injuries in the first team. He made his professional debut with Celta Vigo in a 2–1 La Liga win over FC Barcelona on 16 May 2021.

On 20 July 2026, Sotelo was loaned to fellow top tier side Levante for the season.

== Career statistics ==
As of match played 12 May 2026

Appearances and goals by club, season and competition
Club	Season	League			Cup		Europe		Other		Total	
Club	Season	Division	Apps	Goals	Apps	Goals	Apps	Goals	Apps	Goals	Apps	Goals
Celta	2020–21	La Liga	1	0	—		—		—		1	0
Celta	2021–22	La Liga	1	0	0	0	—		—		1	0
Celta	2022–23	La Liga	1	0	—		—		—		1	0
Celta	2023–24	La Liga	17	0	3	0	—		—		20	0
Celta	2024–25	La Liga	24	0	3	1	—		—		27	1
Celta	2025–26	La Liga	20	0	3	0	7 (Note: Appearances in UEFA Europa League)	0	—		30	0
Celta	Total		64	0	9	1	7	0	—		80	1
Celta B	2022–23	Primera Federación	27	1	—		—		2 (Note: Appearances in 2023 Primera Federación play-offs)	0	29	1
Celta B	2023–24	Primera Federación	1	0	—		—		—		1	0
Celta B	Total		28	1	—		—		2	0	30	1
Career total			92	1	9	1	7	0	2	0	110	2
