= Okay Yokuşlu =

Turkish footballer (born 1994)

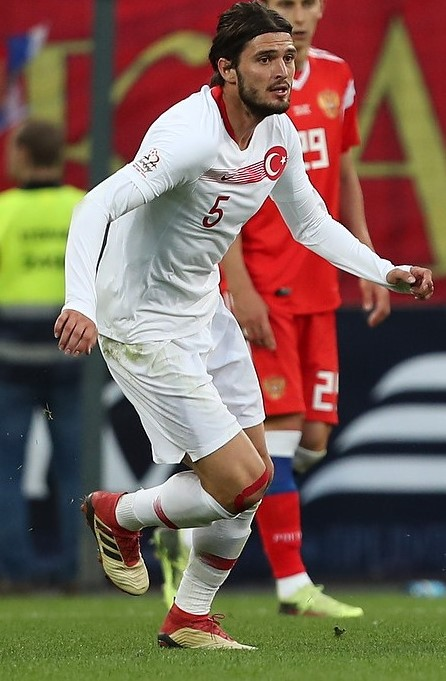
- Yokuşlu with Turkey in 2018

Personal information
- Date of birth: 9 March 1994 (age 32)
- Place of birth: Konak, İzmir, Turkey
- Height: 1.90 m (6 ft 3 in)
- Position: Defensive midfielder

Team information
- Current team: Trabzonspor
- Number: 5

Youth career
- 2002–2006: Karşıyaka
- 2006–2010: Altay

Senior career*
| Years | Team | Apps | (Gls) |
| 2010–2011 | Altay | 33 | (4) |
| 2011–2015 | Kayserispor | 102 | (7) |
| 2015–2018 | Trabzonspor | 86 | (6) |
| 2018–2022 | Celta | 76 | (2) |
| 2021 | → West Bromwich Albion (loan) | 16 | (0) |
| 2022 | → Getafe (loan) | 11 | (0) |
| 2022–2024 | West Bromwich Albion | 84 | (5) |
| 2024– | Trabzonspor | 45 | (2) |

International career^{‡}
| 2009 | Turkey U15 | 6 | (3) |
| 2009–2010 | Turkey U16 | 6 | (1) |
| 2009–2011 | Turkey U17 | 25 | (4) |
| 2011–2013 | Turkey U19 | 10 | (2) |
| 2012–2014 | Turkey U20 | 12 | (1) |
| 2012–2015 | Turkey U21 | 10 | (0) |
| 2015– | Turkey | 47 | (1) |
- * Club domestic league appearances and goals as of 10 June 2026 ‡ National team caps and goals as of 19 November 2024

Okay Yokuşlu (Turkish pronunciation: [okaj jokuʃɫu], born 9 March 1994) is a Turkish professional footballer who plays as a defensive midfielder for Süper Lig club Trabzonspor and the Turkey national team.

== Club career ==
On 27 June 2011, at the age of 17, he signed for Kayserispor for a record transfer fee for Altay of TRY 2.3 million (€1 million). He made his Süper Lig debut in the starting line-up in which Kayserispor were beaten by Antalyaspor with 1–0 final score, on 16 September 2011.

On 1 February 2021, Yokuşlu joined English club West Bromwich Albion on loan from Celta de Vigo, for the remainder of the 2020–21 season. Six days later, he made his debut for Albion as a substitute for Romaine Sawyers in a 2–0 away league defeat by Tottenham Hotspur.

On 26 January 2022, Yokuşlu moved to fellow La Liga side Getafe CF on loan until June.

On 18 July 2022, Yokuşlu returned to now EFL Championship club West Bromwich Albion on a three-year contract following his departure from Celta Vigo. He scored his first goal for the club on 1 November 2022 in a 1–0 home win against Blackpool. On 5 May 2023, Yokuşlu won West Brom's 2022–23 players' player of the Year award in his first full season with the club.

On 31 July 2024, Yokuşlu returned to Süper Lig club Trabzonspor for an undisclosed fee.

== International career ==
Okay was selected for Turkey's U-20 squad for the 2013 FIFA U-20 World Cup. He scored "a beautifully judged chip over the stranded [goalkeeper] from 25 yards (23 m)" to complete the hosts' 2–1 defeat of Australia and progression to the last 16 of the competition. On 6 November 2015, Yokuşlu was selected for the Turkey national football team to play friendlies against Qatar and Greece respectively. He made his debut as a late sub against Greece in a 0–0 tie.

In June 2021, he was included in the list of 26 Turkish players to compete for UEFA Euro 2020.

On 7 June 2024, he is in the final list of 26 players selected by Vincenzo Montella to compete for UEFA Euro 2024.

== Career statistics ==
=== Club ===
As of 3 November 2024

Appearances and goals by club, season and competition
| Club | Season | League | | | National cup | | Continental | | Other | | Total | |
| Club | Season | Division | Apps | Goals | Apps | Goals | Apps | Goals | Apps | Goals | Apps | Goals |
|---|---|---|---|---|---|---|---|---|---|---|---|---|
| Altay | 2009–10 | TFF First League | 12 | 2 | 2 | 1 | — | | 0 | 0 | 14 | 3 |
| Altay | 2010–11 | TFF First League | 21 | 2 | 0 | 0 | — | | 0 | 0 | 21 | 2 |
| Altay | Total | | 33 | 4 | 2 | 1 | 0 | 0 | 0 | 0 | 35 | 5 |
| Kayserispor | 2011–12 | Süper Lig | 22 | 2 | 2 | 0 | — | | 5 (Note: Appearances in Spor Toto Cup) | 1 | 29 | 3 |
| Kayserispor | 2012–13 | Süper Lig | 24 | 0 | 0 | 0 | — | | 0 | 0 | 24 | 0 |
| Kayserispor | 2013–14 | Süper Lig | 25 | 1 | 4 | 0 | — | | 0 | 0 | 29 | 1 |
| Kayserispor | 2014–15 | TFF First League | 31 | 4 | 3 | 1 | — | | 0 | 0 | 34 | 5 |
| Kayserispor | Total | | 102 | 7 | 9 | 1 | 0 | 0 | 5 | 1 | 116 | 9 |
| Trabzonspor | 2015–16 | Süper Lig | 27 | 2 | 7 | 0 | 2 (Note: Appearance(s) in UEFA Europa League) | 1 | 0 | 0 | 36 | 3 |
| Trabzonspor | 2016–17 | Süper Lig | 29 | 2 | 8 | 3 | — | | 0 | 0 | 37 | 5 |
| Trabzonspor | 2017–18 | Süper Lig | 30 | 2 | 3 | 0 | — | | 0 | 0 | 33 | 2 |
| Trabzonspor | Total | | 86 | 6 | 18 | 3 | 2 | 1 | 0 | 0 | 106 | 10 |
| Celta | 2018–19 | La Liga | 30 | 2 | 2 | 0 | — | | 0 | 0 | 32 | 2 |
| Celta | 2019–20 | La Liga | 26 | 0 | 0 | 0 | — | | 0 | 0 | 26 | 0 |
| Celta | 2020–21 | La Liga | 12 | 0 | 2 | 0 | — | | 0 | 0 | 14 | 0 |
| Celta | 2021–22 | La Liga | 8 | 0 | 1 | 0 | — | | 0 | 0 | 9 | 0 |
| Celta | Total | | 76 | 2 | 5 | 0 | 0 | 0 | 0 | 0 | 81 | 2 |
| West Bromwich Albion (loan) | 2020–21 | Premier League | 16 | 0 | 0 | 0 | — | | 0 | 0 | 16 | 0 |
| Getafe (loan) | 2021–22 | La Liga | 11 | 0 | 0 | 0 | — | | 0 | 0 | 11 | 0 |
| West Bromwich Albion | 2022–23 | EFL Championship | 38 | 4 | 2 | 0 | — | | 1 (Note: Appearances in EFL Cup) | 0 | 41 | 4 |
| West Bromwich Albion | 2023–24 | EFL Championship | 46 | 1 | 1 | 0 | — | | 1 | 0 | 48 | 0 |
| West Bromwich Albion | Total | | 84 | 5 | 3 | 0 | 0 | 0 | 2 | 0 | 91 | 4 |
| Trabzonspor | 2024–25 | Süper Lig | 10 | 1 | 0 | 0 | 4 (Note: Two appearances in UEFA Europa League and two appearances in UEFA Conference League) | 0 | 0 | 0 | 14 | 1 |
| Career total | | | 418 | 25 | 37 | 5 | 6 | 1 | 7 | 1 | 472 | 31 |

=== International ===
As of match played 19 November 2024.

Appearances and goals by national team and year
| National team | Year | Apps | Goals |
|---|---|---|---|
| Turkey | 2015 | 1 | 0 |
| Turkey | 2016 | 2 | 0 |
| Turkey | 2017 | 6 | 0 |
| Turkey | 2018 | 11 | 1 |
| Turkey | 2019 | 4 | 0 |
| Turkey | 2020 | 5 | 0 |
| Turkey | 2021 | 10 | 0 |
| Turkey | 2022 | 0 | 0 |
| Turkey | 2023 | 0 | 0 |
| Turkey | 2024 | 8 | 0 |
| Total | | 47 | 1 |

Scores and results list Turkey's goal tally first, score column indicates score after each Yokuşlu goal.

List of international goals scored by Okay Yokuşlu
| No. | Date | Venue | Opponent | Score | Result | Competition |
|---|---|---|---|---|---|---|
| 1 | 27 March 2018 | Podgorica City Stadium, Podgorica, Montenegro | Montenegro | 2–0 | 2–2 | Friendly |
