= Hugo Álvarez (footballer, born 2003) =

Spanish footballer

Personal information
- Full name: Hugo Álvarez Antúnez
- Date of birth: 2 July 2003 (age 23)
- Place of birth: Ourense, Spain
- Height: 1.76 m (5 ft 9 in)
- Position: Winger

Team information
- Current team: Celta
- Number: 23

Youth career
- 2007–2011: Ourense
- 2011–2022: Celta

Senior career*
Years	Team	Apps	(Gls)
2021–	Celta	67	(9)
2022–2024	Celta B	60	(8)

International career^{‡}
2024	Spain U21	2	(0)
- * Club domestic league appearances and goals as of 26 May 2026 ‡ National team caps and goals as of 03:54, 16 October 2024 (UTC)

Hugo Álvarez Antúnez (born 2 July 2003) is a Spanish professional footballer who plays mainly as a left winger for La Liga club Celta de Vigo.

== Club career ==
Álvarez began playing football with the youth academy of Ourense CF in 2007 at the age of four, and moved to RC Celta de Vigo's academy at under-8 level. He made his professional debut with Celta in a 3–0 La Liga win over Getafe CF on 25 October 2021.

== International career ==
Álvarez has represented Spain at the under-21 level. He received his call-up in October 2024 for the 2025 UEFA European Under-21 Championship qualification matches. He made his debut in Spain's 4–3 victory against Kazakhstan, coming on as a substitute in the second half.

== Career statistics ==
As of match played 23 May 2026

Appearances and goals by club, season and competition
Club	Season	League			Copa del Rey		Europe		Other		Total	
Club	Season	Division	Apps	Goals	Apps	Goals	Apps	Goals	Apps	Goals	Apps	Goals
Celta B	2022–23	Primera Federación	35	2	—		—		2 (Note: Appearances in 2023 Primera Federación play-offs)	0	37	2
Celta B	2023–24	Primera Federación	25	6	—		—		2 (Note: Appearances in 2024 Primera Federación play-offs)	0	27	6
Celta B	Total		60	8	0	0	0	0	4	0	64	8
Celta	2021–22	La Liga	1	0	0	0	—		—		1	0
Celta	2023–24	La Liga	12	1	4	0	—		—		16	1
Celta	2024–25	La Liga	26	4	2	0	—		—		28	4
Celta	2025–26	La Liga	28	2	3	0	7 (Note: Appearances in UEFA Europa League)	0	—		38	2
Celta	Total		67	7	9	0	7	0	4	0	83	7
Career total			127	15	9	0	7	0	4	0	147	15
