= Alfon (footballer) =

Spanish footballer (born 1999)

Alfon González
Personal information
- Full name: Alfonso González Martínez
- Date of birth: 4 May 1999 (age 27)
- Place of birth: Albacete, Spain
- Height: 1.72 m (5 ft 8 in)
- Position: Winger

Team information
- Current team: Sevilla
- Number: 7

Youth career
- –2018: Albacete

Senior career*
Years	Team	Apps	(Gls)
2016–2018	Albacete B	56	(11)
2017–2021	Albacete	1	(0)
2018–2019	→ Internacional Madrid (loan)	24	(5)
2019–2020	→ Getafe B (loan)	21	(3)
2020–2021	→ Celta B (loan)	16	(4)
2021	→ Celta (loan)	2	(0)
2021–2024	Celta B	73	(21)
2022–2023	→ Racing Santander (loan)	8	(0)
2023	→ Murcia (loan)	15	(0)
2024–2025	Celta	26	(5)
2025–	Sevilla	10	(1)
2026	→ Villarreal (loan)	10	(1)

International career
2017	Spain U18	2	(0)
- * Club domestic league appearances and goals as of 27 May 2026

Alfonso González Martínez (born 4 May 1999), commonly known as Alfon or Alfon González, is a Spanish professional footballer who plays mainly as a left winger for La Liga club Sevilla.

== Club career ==
=== Albacete ===
Alfon was born in Albacete, Castilla–La Mancha, and was an Albacete Balompié youth graduate. He made his senior debut with the reserves at the age of 17 on 21 August 2016, starting in a 1–0 Tercera División away loss against CD Atlético Tomelloso.

Alfon scored his first senior goal on 9 October 2016, netting the equalizer in a 3–1 home loss against CD Toledo B. He made his first team debut the following 14 May, replacing José Fran in a 0–0 home draw against Real Madrid Castilla in the Segunda División B championship.

==== Loans to Internacional Madrid and Getafe ====
On 29 August 2018, after spending the previous campaign exclusively with the B's, Alfon was loaned to Internacional de Madrid in the third division, for one year. Upon returning, he renewed his contract until 2022 on 12 July 2019, but still moved to Getafe CF B also in a temporary deal on 29 August.

=== Celta ===
==== B-team and first team debut ====
On 21 August 2020, Alfon moved to another reserve team, Celta de Vigo B, also on a one-year loan deal. He made his first team debut the following 5 January, replacing Emre Mor in a 5–2 Copa del Rey away loss against UD Ibiza.

Alfon made his La Liga debut on 8 January 2021, replacing Fran Beltrán in a 4–0 home loss against Villarreal CF. In July, the club exercised his buyout clause.

==== Loans to Racing Santander and Murcia ====
On 27 June 2022, Alfon moved to Segunda División side Racing de Santander on loan for the season. His loan was cut short the following 30 January, and he moved to Real Murcia also in a temporary deal just hours later.

==== First team breakthrough ====
Back to Celta and their B-team for the 2023–24 campaign, Alfon scored a career-best 15 goals as the club narrowly missed out promotion in the play-offs. After spending the 2024 pre-season with the main squad, he became a permanent member of the team after being handed the number 12 jersey.

Alfon scored his first professional goal on 23 November 2024, netting Celta's first in a 2–2 home draw against FC Barcelona. He subsequently started to feature more regularly for the side, but still left the club on 30 June 2025, after his contract expired.

=== Sevilla ===
On 1 July 2025, Sevilla FC announced the signing of Alfon on a three-year deal.

==== Loan to Villarreal ====
On 26 January 2026, Alfon was loaned to fellow top tier side Villarreal CF until June, with a buyout clause.

== Career statistics ==
=== Club ===
As of match played 17 May 2026

Appearances and goals by club, season and competition
Club	Season	League			Cup		Europe		Other		Total	
Club	Season	Division	Apps	Goals	Apps	Goals	Apps	Goals	Apps	Goals	Apps	Goals
Albacete B	2016–17	Tercera División	21	3	—		—		—		21	3
Albacete B	2017–18	Tercera División	35	8	—		—		—		35	8
Albacete B	Total		56	11	0	0	—		0	0	56	11
Albacete	2016–17	Segunda División B	1	0	0	0	—		—		1	0
Internacional Madrid (loan)	2018–19	Segunda División B	24	5	1	0	—		—		25	5
Getafe B (loan)	2019–20	Segunda División B	21	3	—		—		—		21	3
Celta B (loan)	2020–21	Segunda División B	16	5	—		—		1 (Note: Appearance in 2021 Segunda División B play-offs)	0	17	5
Celta (loan)	2020–21	La Liga	2	0	1	0	—		—		3	0
Celta B	2021–22	Primera Federación	35	8	—		—		35	8		
Celta B	2023–24	Primera Federación	38	13	—		—		2 (Note: Appearances in 2024 Primera Federación play-offs)	0	40	13
Celta B	Total		73	21	0	0	—		2	0	75	21
Racing Santander (loan)	2022–23	Segunda División	8	0	1	0	—		—		9	0
Real Murcia (loan)	2022–23	Primera Federación	15	0	0	0	—		—		15	0
Celta Vigo	2024–25	La Liga	26	5	3	3	—		—		29	8
Sevilla	2025–26	La Liga	10	1	3	1	—		—		13	2
Villarreal	2025–26	La Liga	10	1	—		0	0	—		10	1
Career total			262	52	9	4	0	0	3	0	274	56
