= José Fontán =

Spanish footballer

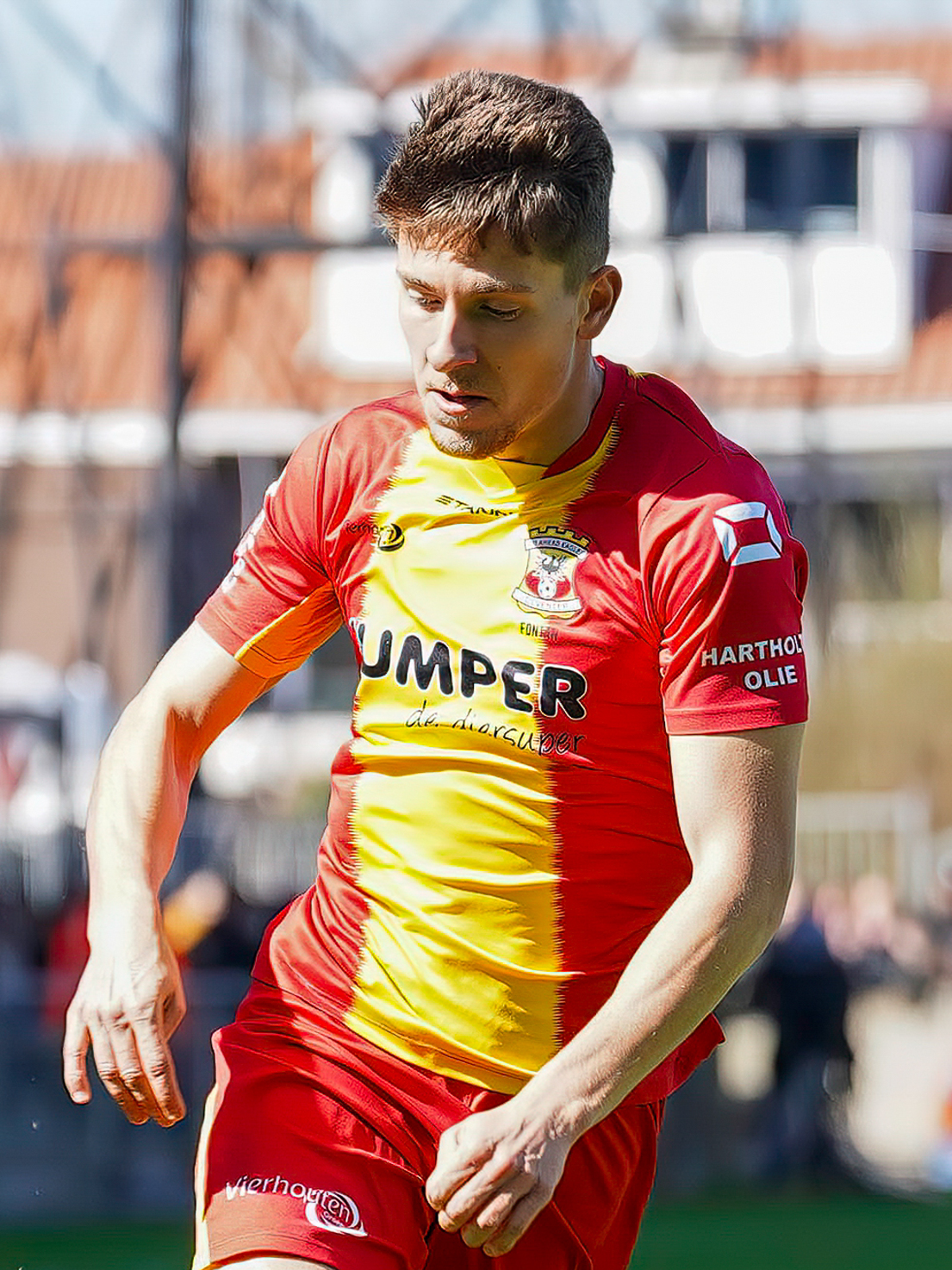
- Fontan (2023)

Personal information
- Full name: José Manuel Fontán Mondragón
- Date of birth: 11 February 2000 (age 26)
- Place of birth: Vilagarcía de Arousa, Spain
- Height: 1.83 m (6 ft 0 in)
- Positions: Centre-back; left-back

Team information
- Current team: Arouca
- Number: 3

Youth career
- San Miguel de Deiro
- Arosa
- 2011–2018: Celta

Senior career*
Years	Team	Apps	(Gls)
2018–2020	Celta B	30	(0)
2020–2024	Celta	23	(0)
2022–2023	→ Go Ahead Eagles (loan)	21	(1)
2023–2024	→ Cartagena (loan)	37	(4)
2024–	Arouca	59	(3)

International career
2021–2022	Spain U21	4	(0)
- * Club domestic league appearances and goals as of 25 May 2026

José Manuel Fontán Mondragón (born 11 February 2000) is a Spanish footballer who plays as either a left-back or a centre-back for Portuguese club FC Arouca.

== Club career ==
Born in Vilagarcía de Arousa, Pontevedra, Galicia, Fontán joined RC Celta de Vigo's youth setup in 2011, after representing Arosa SC and UD San Miguel de Deiro. He made his senior debut with the reserves on 14 October 2018, coming on as a late substitute for Diego Alende in a 0–3 Segunda División B away loss against Atlético Madrid B.

Fontán made his professional debut for Celta on 23 January 2020, starting in a 1–2 loss at CD Mirandés, for the season's Copa del Rey. His La Liga debut occurred on 1 October, as he started in a 0–3 home loss against FC Barcelona but was taken off in the 32nd minute due to an injury.

On 27 July 2021, Fontán renewed his contract until 2025, being definitely promoted to the main squad. On 18 June of the following year, he was loaned to Eredivisie side Go Ahead Eagles for the season.

On 21 August 2023, Fontán was loaned to Segunda División side FC Cartagena for the 2023–24 season. On 4 July of the following year, he signed for FC Arouca in the Portuguese Primeira Liga on a two-year contract.

== Personal life ==
Fontán's twin brother Javier is also a footballer. Their father, also named Javier, was also a footballer and a defender; both represented Arosa as a senior.

== Career statistics ==
=== Club ===
As of match played 2 June 2024

Appearances and goals by club, season and competition
Club	Season	League			National Cup		Other		Total	
Club	Season	Division	Apps	Goals	Apps	Goals	Apps	Goals	Apps	Goals
Celta B	2018–19	Segunda División B	8	0	—		0	0	8	0
Celta B	2019–20	Segunda División B	22	0	—		0	0	22	0
Celta B	Total		30	0	0	0	0	0	30	0
Celta	2019–20	La Liga	0	0	1	0	—		1	0
Celta	2020–21	La Liga	14	0	2	0	—		16	0
Celta	2021–22	La Liga	9	0	3	2	—		12	2
Celta	Total		23	0	6	2	0	0	29	2
Go Ahead Eagles	2022–23	Eredivisie	21	1	3	0	—		24	1
Go Ahead Eagles	Total		21	1	3	0	0	0	24	1
Cartagena	2023–24	Segunda División	37	4	3	0	—		40	4
Cartagena	Total		37	4	3	0	0	0	40	4
Arouca	2024–25	Primeira Liga	0	0	0	0	—		0	0
Arouca	Total		0	0	0	0	0	0	0	0
Career total			111	5	12	2	0	0	123	7
