= Portuguese Way =

Camino de Santiago pilgrimage routes starting in Portugal

Portuguese Way Caminho Português
- Map of routes from Portugal to Santiago de Compostela in Galicia
- Length: 260 kilometres (160 mi) from Porto / 620 kilometres (390 mi) from Lisbon approximately
- Location: Portugal, Galicia
- Trailheads: Porto/Lisbon to Galicia
- Use: Hiking, cycling
- Difficulty: Moderate
- Season: From March to October

The Portuguese Way (Portuguese: Caminho Português, Spanish: Camino Portugués) is the name of the Camino de Santiago pilgrimage routes starting in Portugal. It begins at Porto or Lisbon. From Porto, along the Douro River, pilgrims travel north crossing the five main rivers—the Ave, Cávado, Neiva, Lima and Minho—before entering Spain and passing through Pontevedra on the way to Santiago de Compostela. The Portuguese Way is 260 km long starting in Porto or 610 km long starting in Lisbon. The way from Porto was historically used by the local populations and by those who arrived in the local ports.

== Statistics ==
In 2025, the Portuguese Way was the second most popular route after the French Way with 19%. Most pilgrims were from Spain (37%), Portugal (12%), USA (7%) and Germany (5%). Most pilgrims who received the certificate of accomplishment started in Tui (41%), Porto (26%) or Valença (18%). The months in which most pilgrims finish this camino is from May to September.

The Portuguese coastal way was the third most popular route in 2025 with 17%. Most pilgrims were from Spain (20%), USA (12%), Germany (11%) and Italy (7%). Most pilgrims who received the certificate of accomplishment started in Porto (51%), Vigo (21%) or Baiona (12%). Out of all pilgrims who started in Porto, 55% took the route via Tui and 45% via Vigo. The months in which most pilgrims finish this camino is in May and September.

== Lisbon to Porto ==
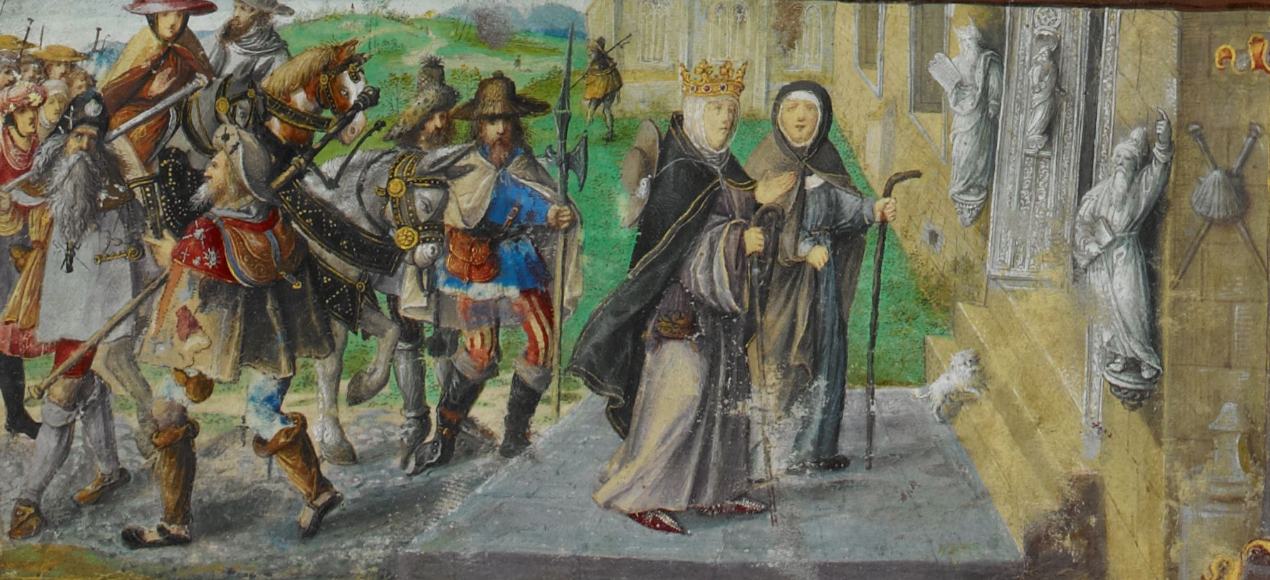
Arrival of Queen Elizabeth of Portugal in Santiago de Compostela, after finishing the Portuguese Way around 1325, after the death of her husband, Denis of Portugal.

From Lisbon, the starting point is Lisbon Cathedral, passing the Thermal Hospital of Caldas da Rainha (1485) and heading to the Alcobaça Monastery (1252), which was an albergue (hostel) for medieval pilgrims who could only stay there for a single night.

Pilgrims finishing the Camino Portuguese da Costa, 2014–2025

Green bars are holy years

Using Roman roads, pilgrims headed to Coimbra and had to reach Porto before night fell, as the gates of the city closed. The most notable of the bridges in Porto is Dom Luís I Bridge (1888) replacing the Ponte das Barcas (1842), the barges bridge. Porto is the typical starting point. The ruins from the 14th century city walls still exist including the Postigo do Carvão, the charcoal wicket gate. This wicket provided a link between Fonte Taurina Street to the wharf, where boats anchored in the Douro.

Once in Porto, pilgrims headed to Church of São Martinho de Cedofeita (c. 1087). Porto is a medieval city, showing hints of Romanesque and Gothic, as seen in the Cathedral, São Francisco Church and the city walls, and strong Baroque and neoclassical influences which shape most of its old town skyline, including the iconic Clérigos Tower (1754–1763), Carmo church (1768) and Palácio da Bolsa (mid-19th century).

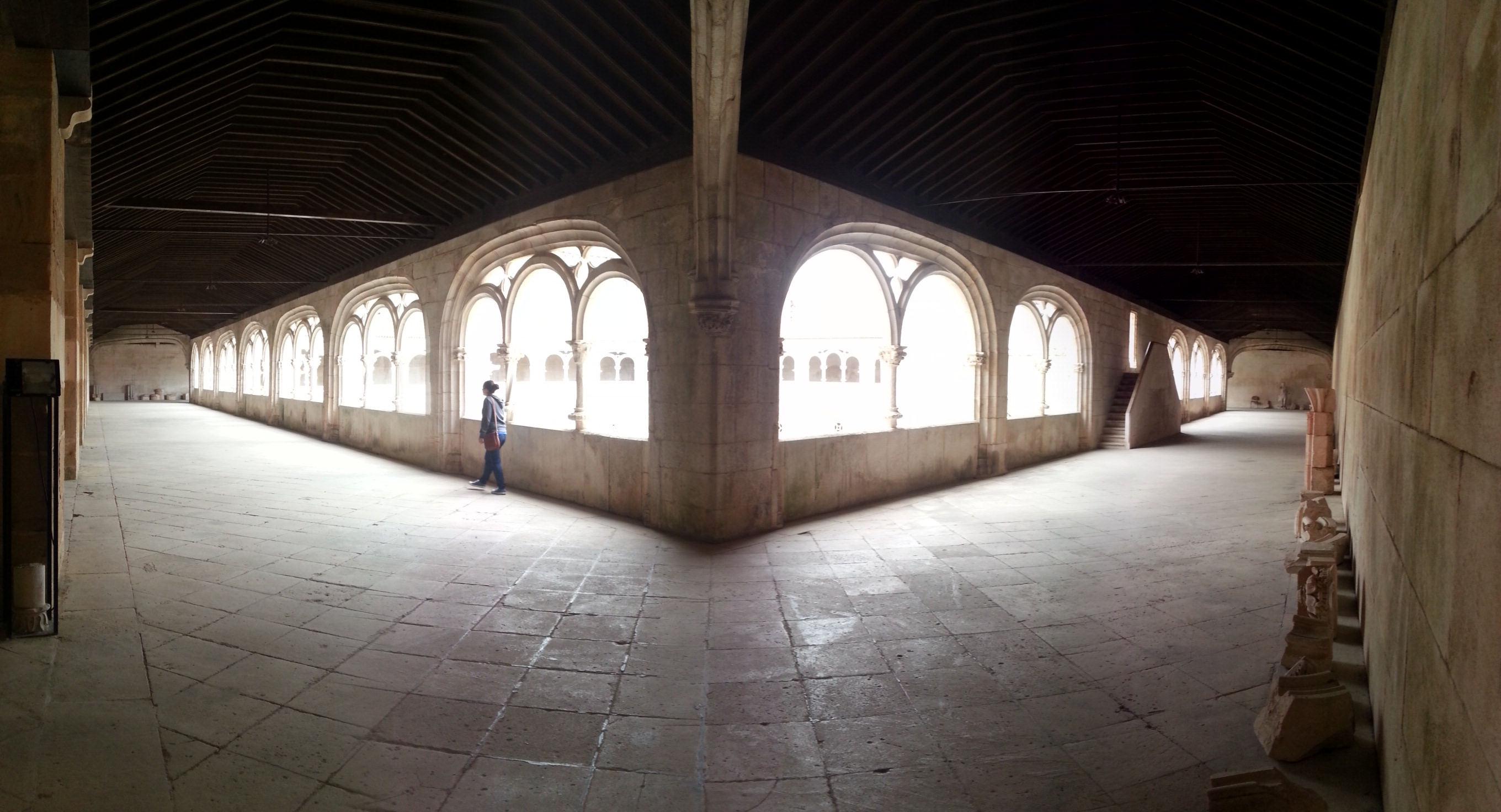
Claustre of Silence in Alcobaça Monastery, an early pilgrim hostel. Conversations were expressly forbidden.

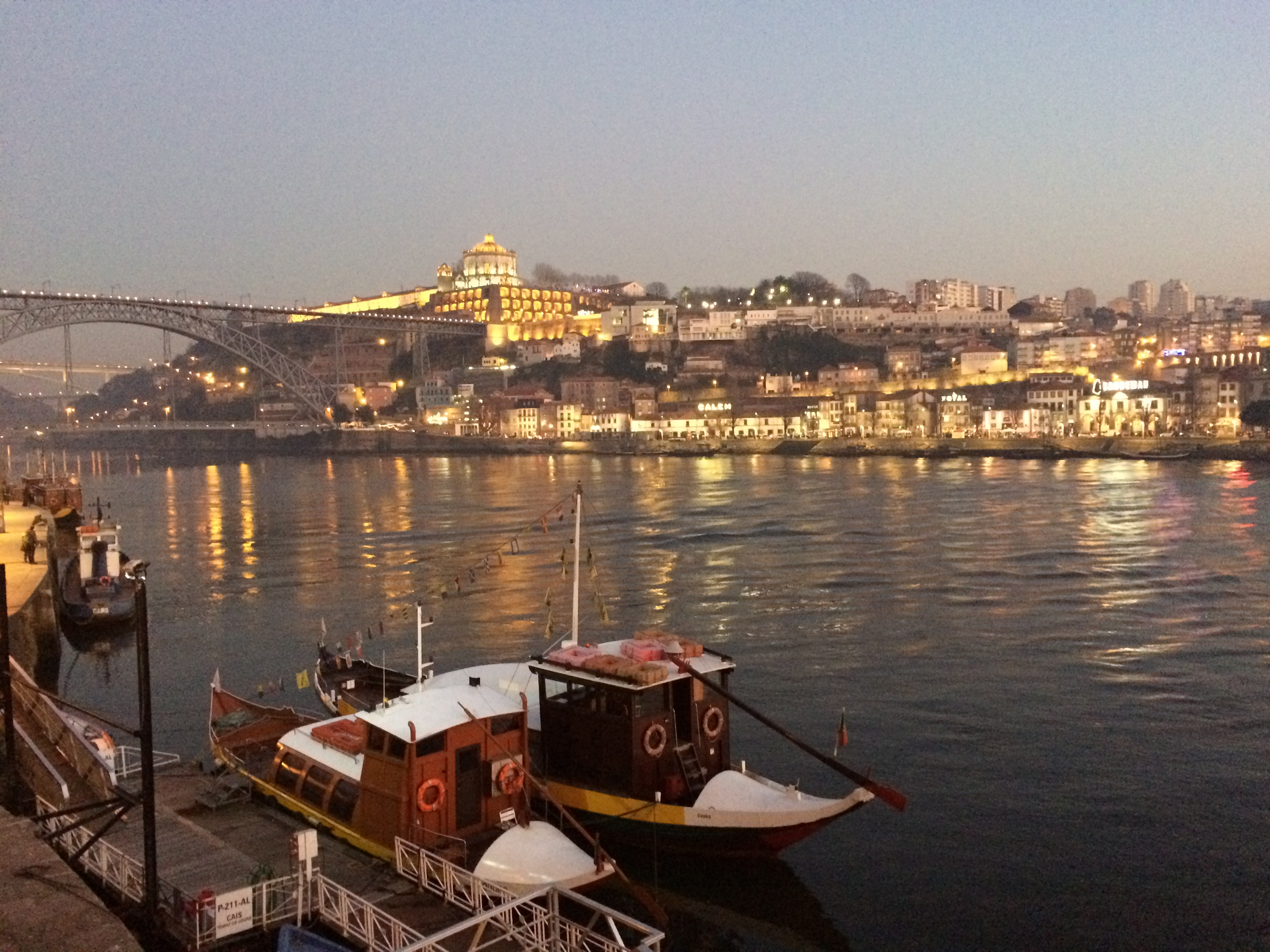
The Douro river and Dom Luís Bridge

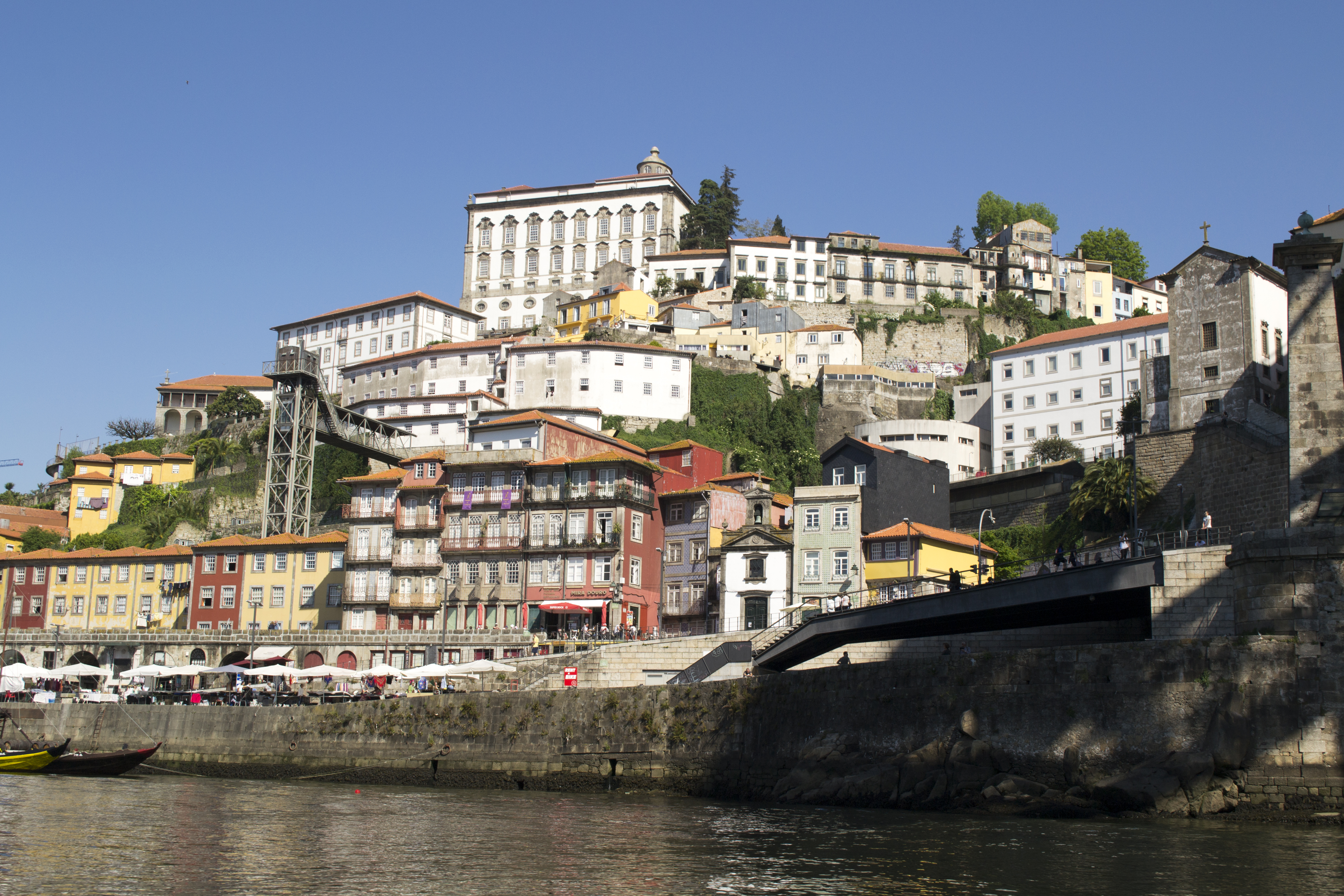
Porto as seen from the Douro, with the wharf in sight

== Ave river crossing ==
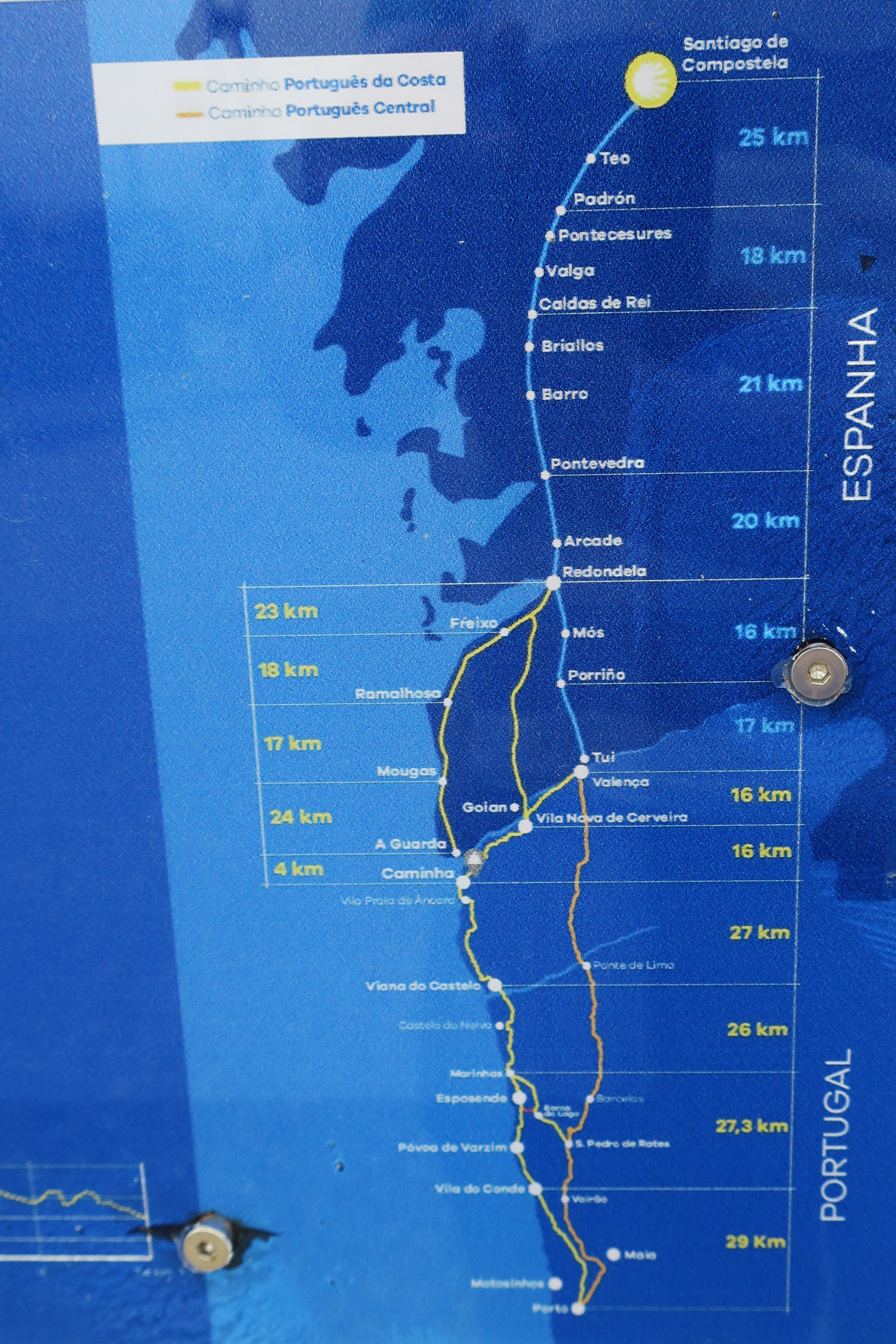
Historical Portuguese Way of Saint James from Porto to Compostela, including the Coastal way, the Central Way and the Coastal derivation from Rates Monastery to Barca do Lago.

There are two traditional routes from Porto, one inland (the Central Way) and the Coastal Way (Caminho da Costa). The Coastal Way gained prominence in the 15th century due to the growing importance of the coastal towns in the advent of the Age of Discovery. Next to Porto, there's the Monastery of Leça do Balio (1180) in Matosinhos, known by the assistance of pilgrims. After leaving Porto, the route splits from the central way in the countryside of Vila do Conde. The rising importance of Póvoa de Varzim imposed this new direction. The coastal way uses the Estrada Nova (the New road), known to exist already in 1568 as a road connection between the towns of Porto, Vila do Conde and Póvoa de Varzim. This road is now mostly known as Estrada Velha (Old road). The older street was Karraria Antiqua (the Central Way) or a probable Roman beachfront way (per Loca Maritima) linking pre-Roman settlements, Roman fish factories and villas that are known to exist.

The Estrada Velha merges with the EN13 highway only before reaching Vila do Conde in the parish of Azurara and splits again just after crossing the Ave river. In that road junction, the late Gothic Azurara Church was rebuilt in 1502 by the people of the village to commemorate the pilgrimage of Manuel I of Portugal. Just across the river, the town of Vila do Conde is still today crowned by the Monastery of Santa Clara (1318). The monastery's Neo-Palladian building (1777) dominates the town's skyline and is one of the pilgrim's first sights. The town of Vila do Conde is noted for the austere Gothic and lavish Late Gothic architecture, with the Matriz Church of Vila do Conde being built by king Manuel I during that pilgrimage.

Vila do Conde riverside was a relevant Discovery Age port. As legacy, it keeps a carrack replica and Socorro Chapel (1559), built by the seafarers and inspired by the novelties they saw in Asia. After crossing the Gothic church of Vila do Conde, in Rua da Igreja, the Estrada Velha is renamed Rua dos Benguiados, Rua das Violetas and Rua dos Ferreiros, reaching Póvoa de Varzim's 18th century fishermen's quarter and heading to the small Saint James Chapel (1582) in Praça da República (traditionally named Saint James Square, Largo de Santiago). The chapel was built by Discovery Age seafarers, honoring Saint Roch, but the Saint James veneration grew stronger due to a 15th-century icon of Saint James found at the nearby beach and kept in there. The way follows west of the chapel to the beach by Rua da Junqueira, heading to Esposende, Viana do Castelo and Caminha before reaching the Spanish border. From Póvoa, a new route to the central way uses a rail trail leading directly to the Rates Monastery and passing churches dedicated to Saint James.

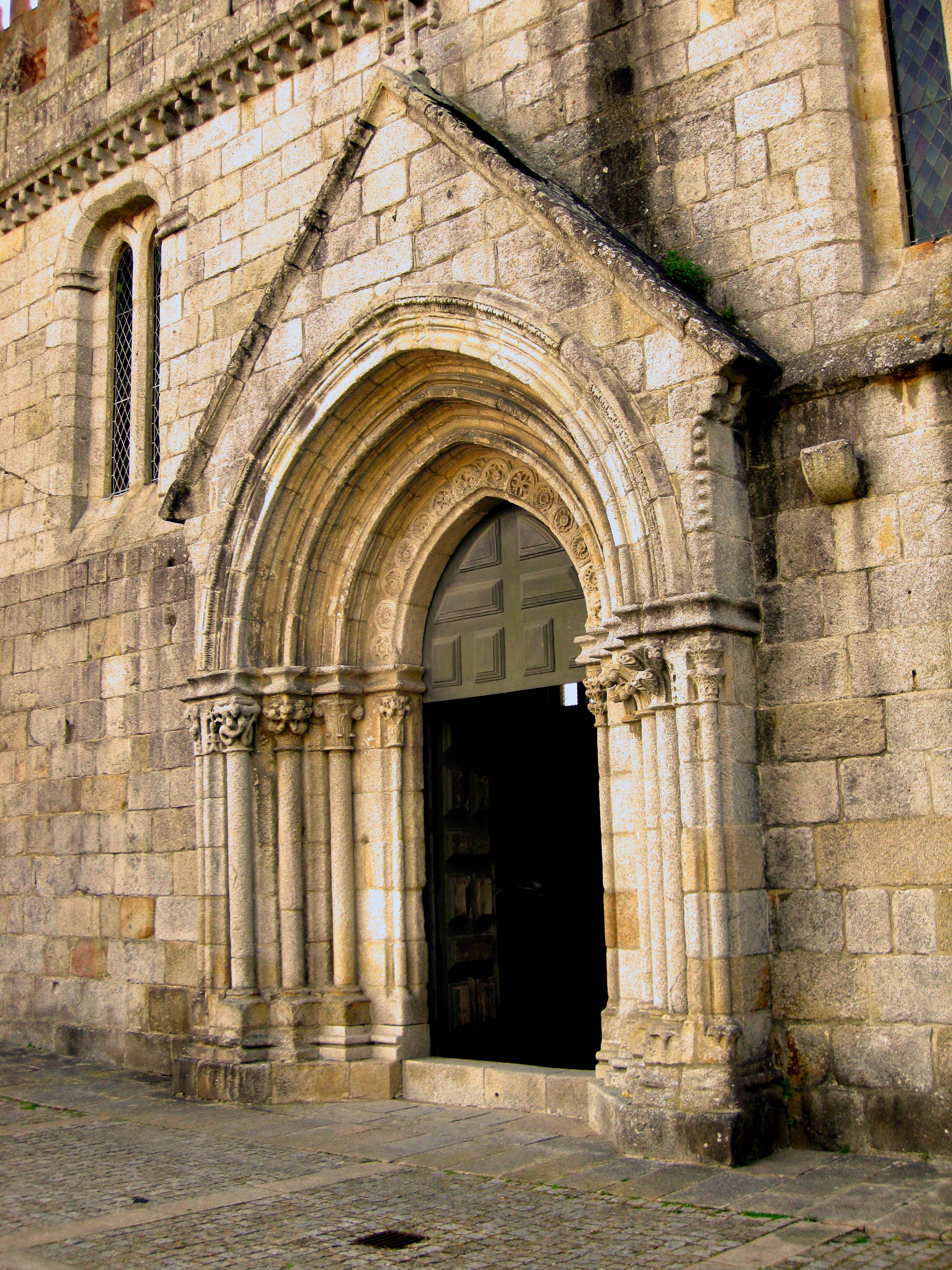
Monastery of Leça do Balio. Romanesque transitional to Gothic.

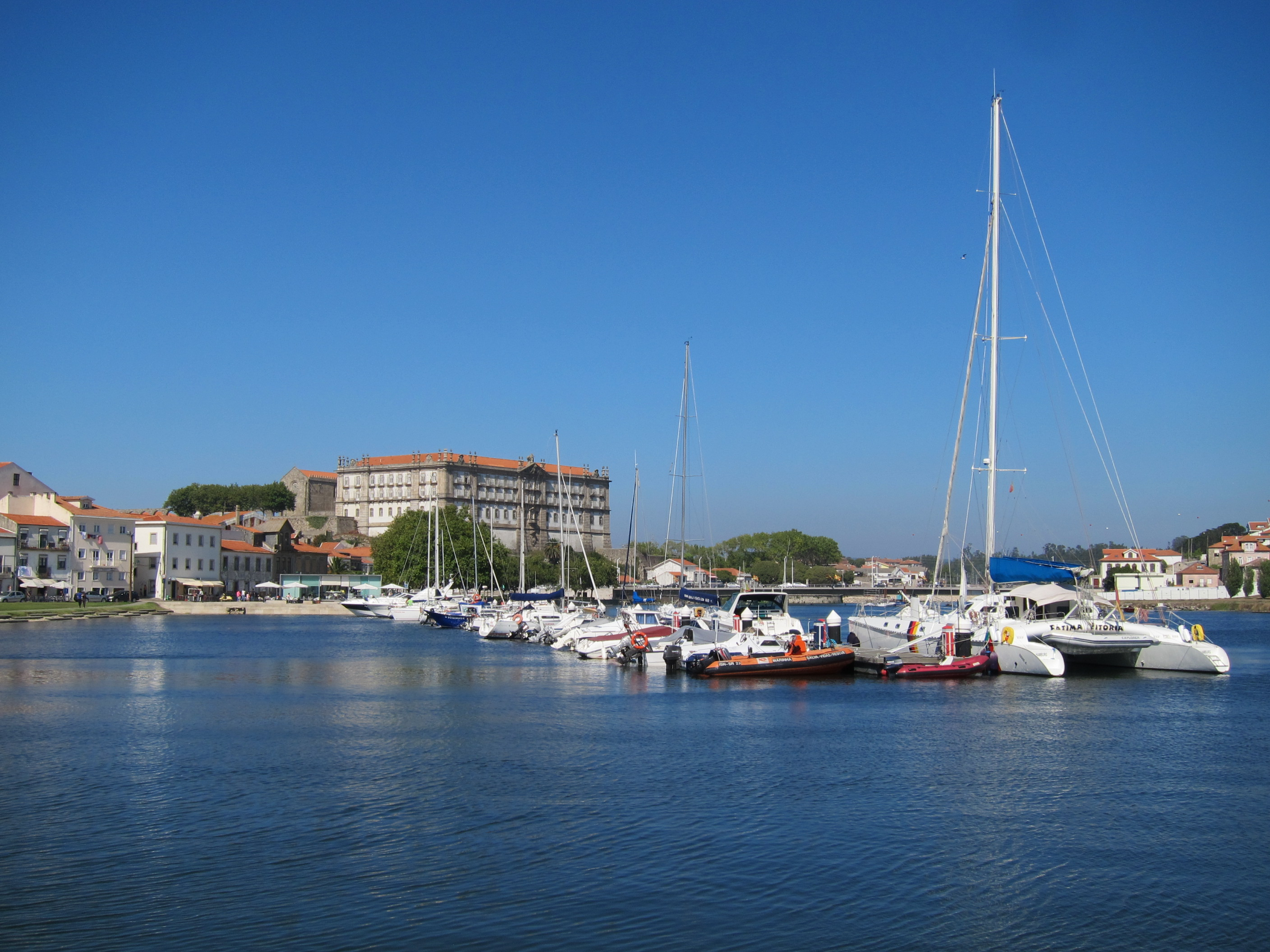
Monastery of Santa Clara in an area rich in Legacy architecture

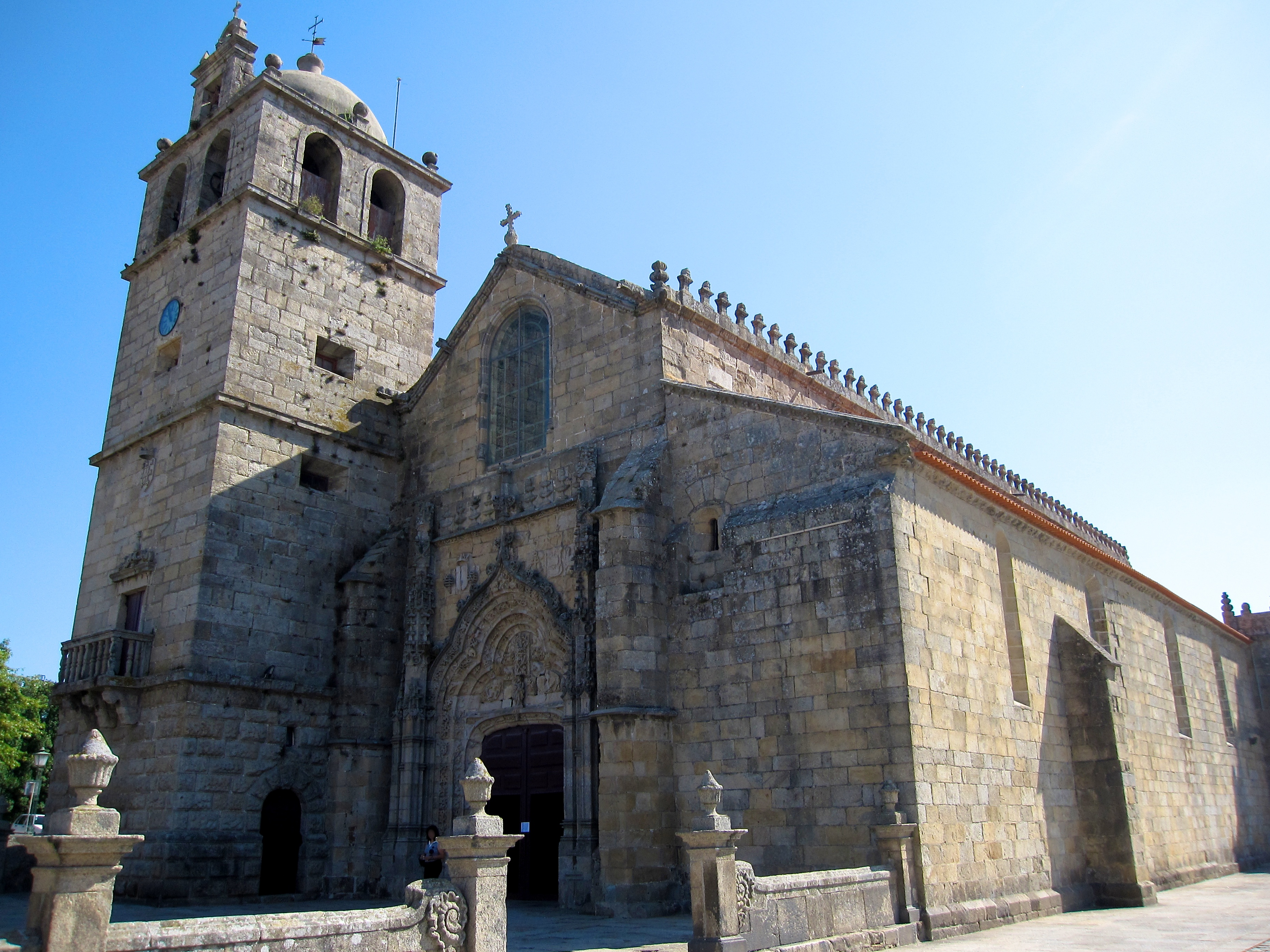
The Portuguese late Gothic Matriz Church of Vila do Conde built during the pilgrimage of Manuel I of Portugal in 1502

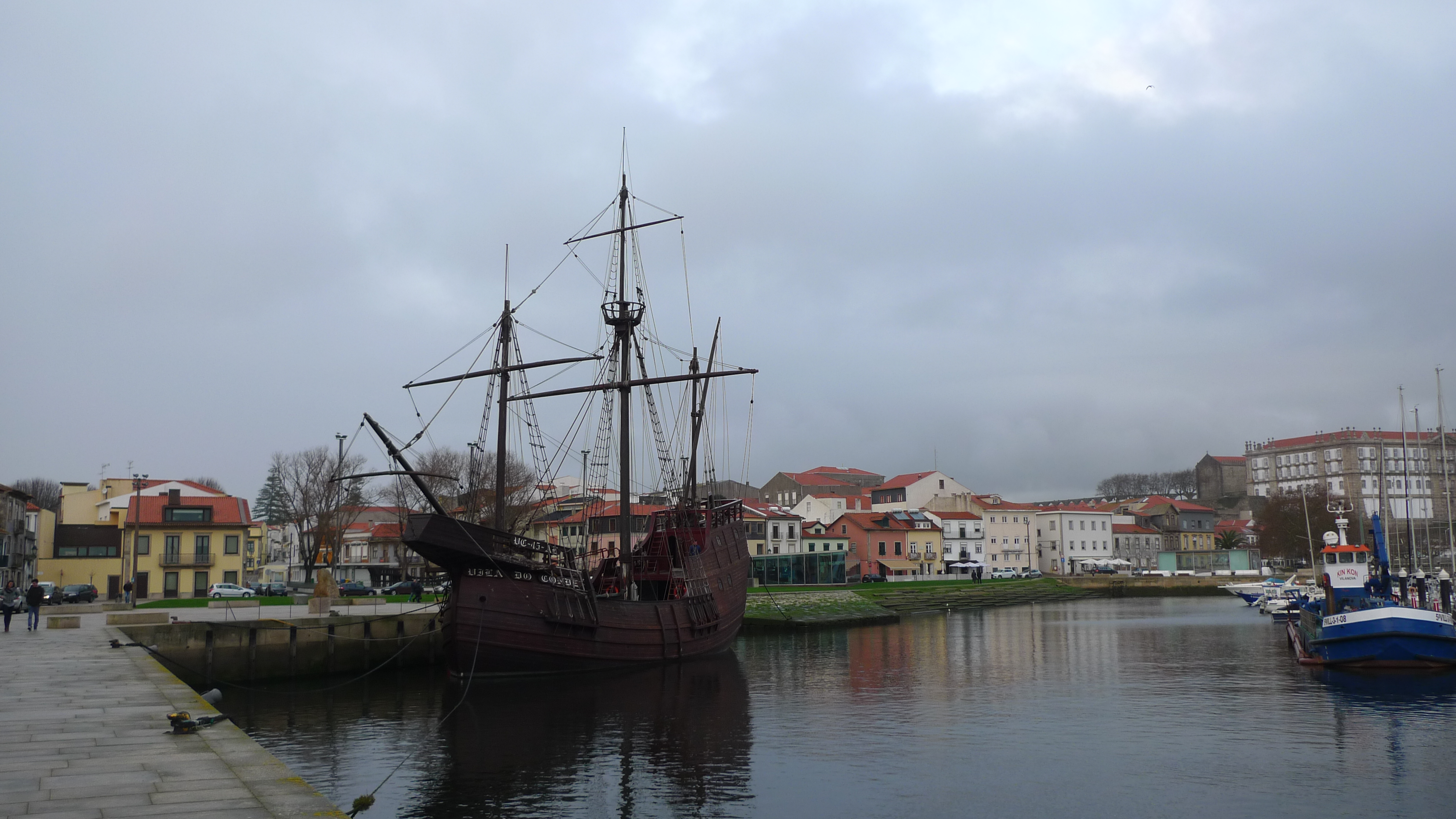
The Discovery Age carrack replica

=== The beach boardwalks ===
A contemporary version of the Coastal Way, pushed by German pilgrims, goes through Northern Portugal continuously along the sea, using beach walkways. This version of the Coastal Way is gaining importance, as the traditional route is increasingly urbanized and the new version is considered by some pilgrims to be more pleasant. As a form of respect for pilgrims on foot and local use, the use of bicycles is not allowed in some of these walkways. It follows a trend which started with Hape Kerkeling's book I'm Off Then: Losing and Finding Myself on the Camino De Santiago.

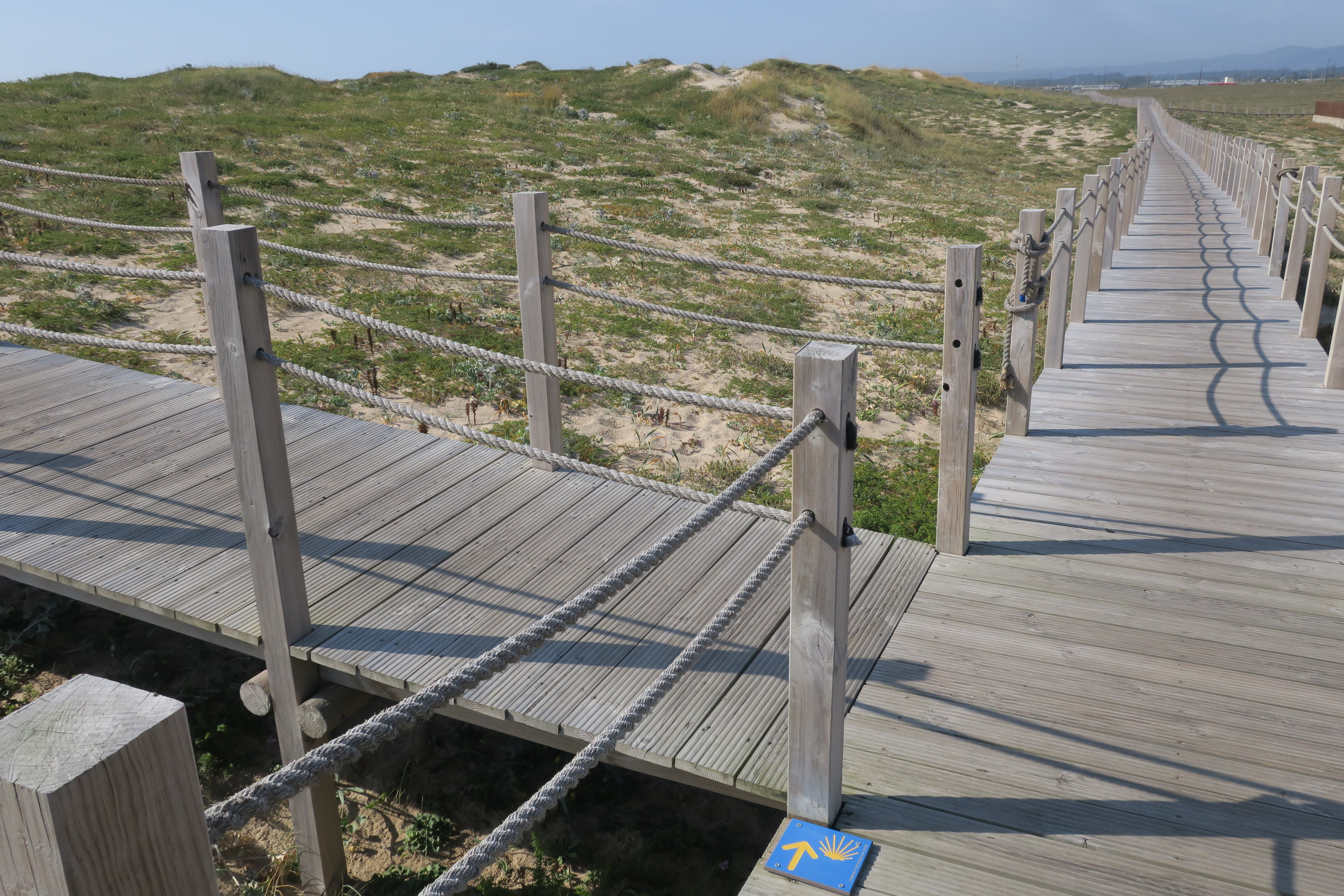
A marking in a boardwalk of the Portuguese coastal way

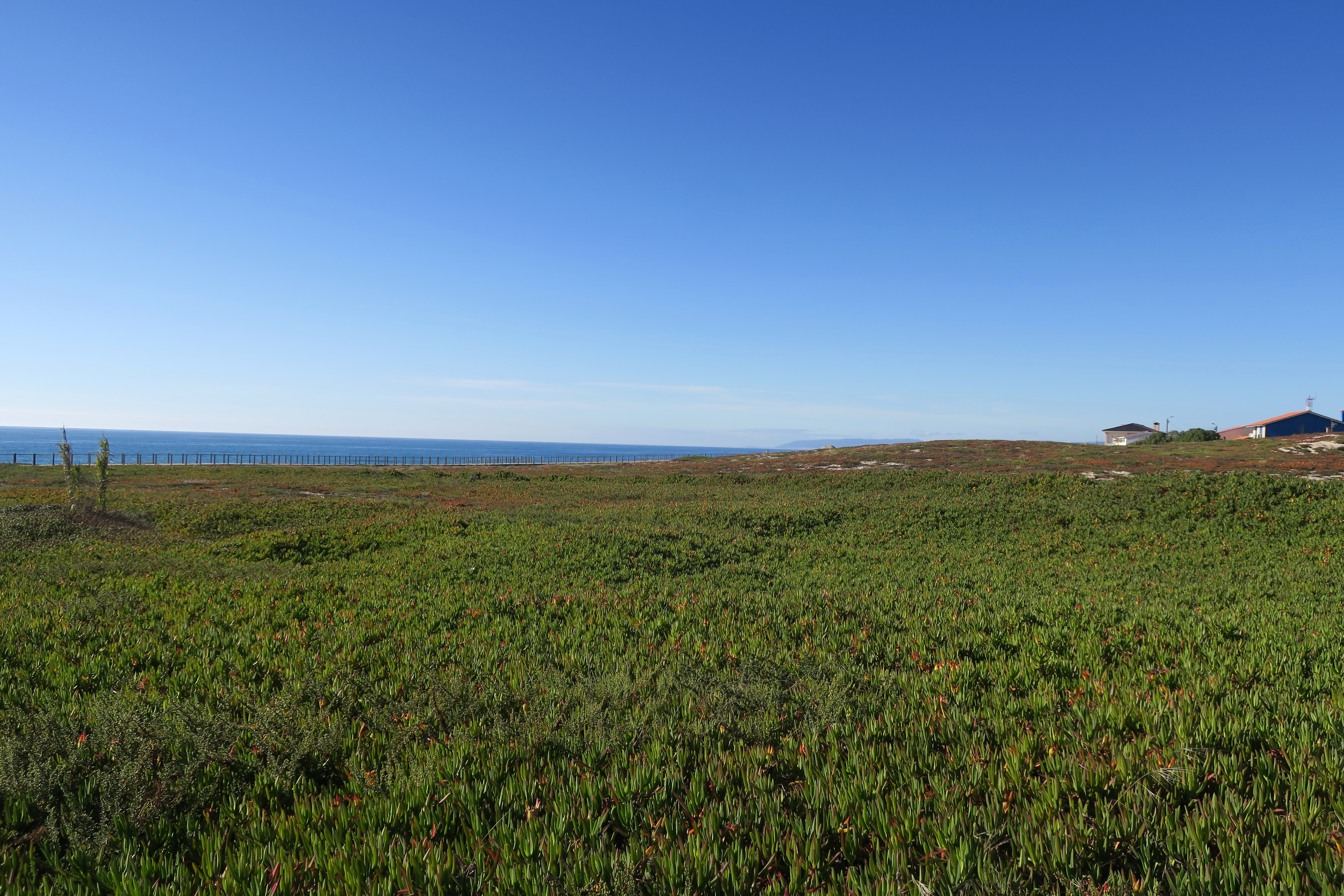
A boardwalk in Santo André, Póvoa de Varzim

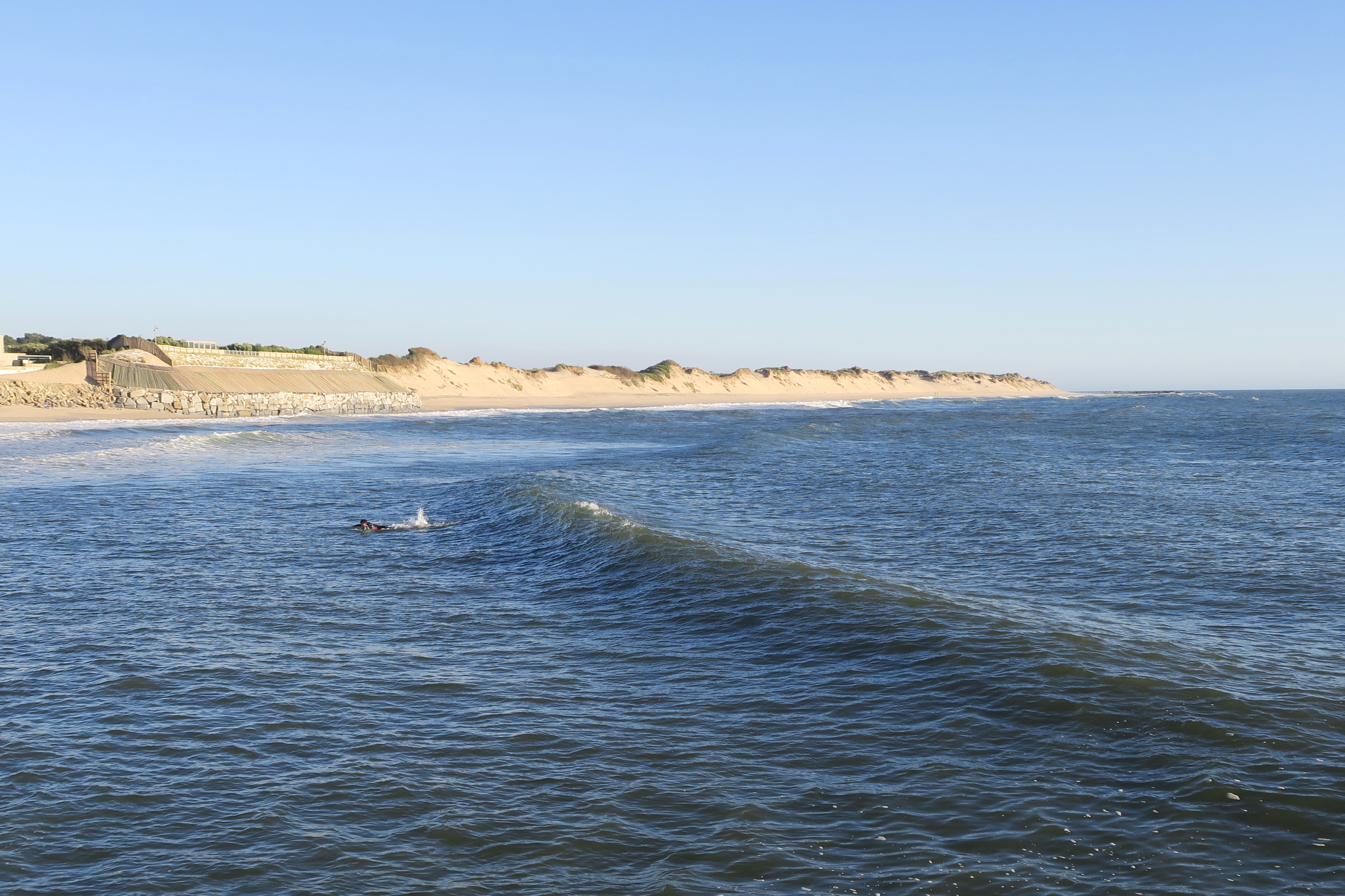
A 1,5 km way along the Sand dunes in Ofir, Esposende.

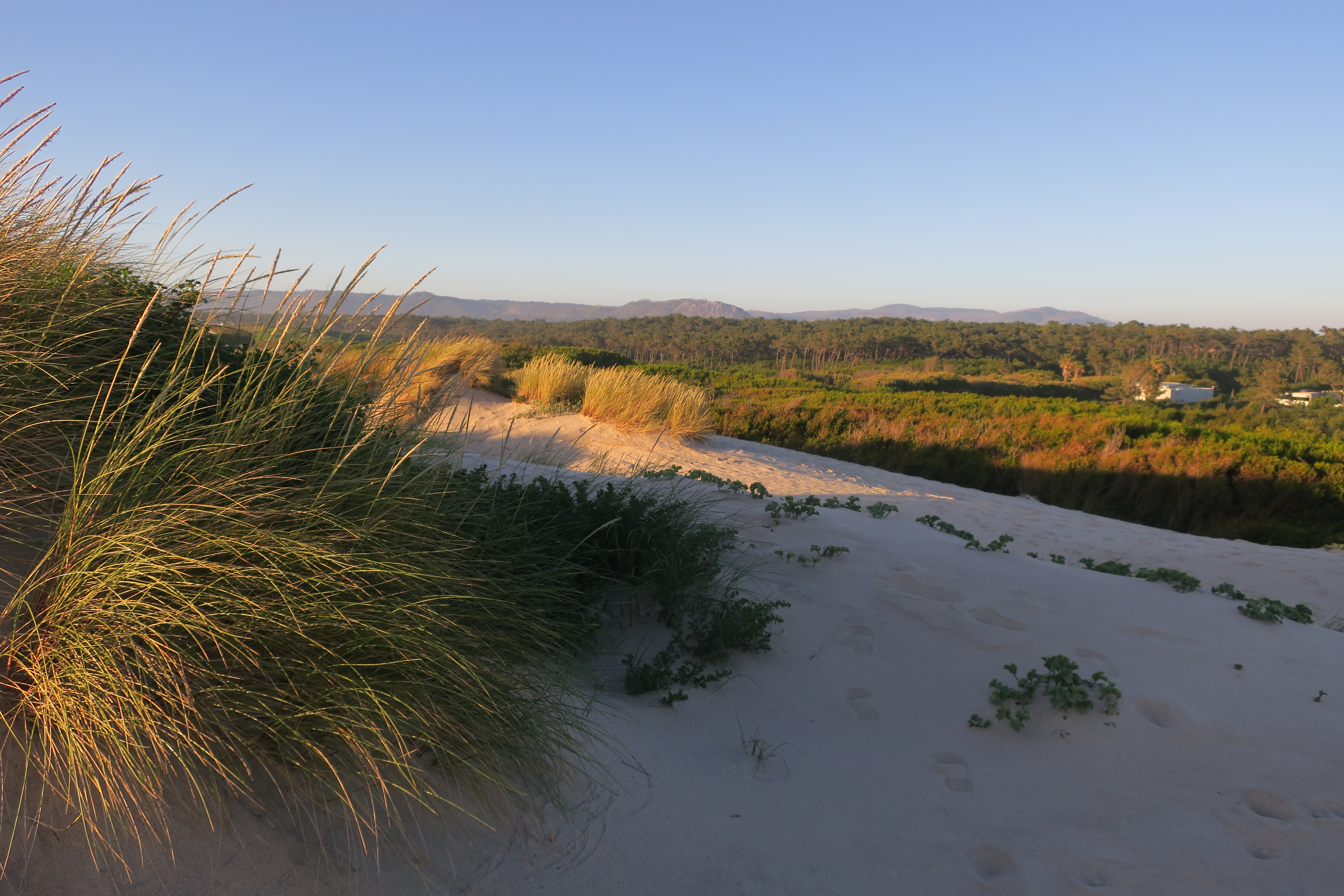
Maritime Pine forest in Fão, Esposende

=== The legend of Rates Monastery ===
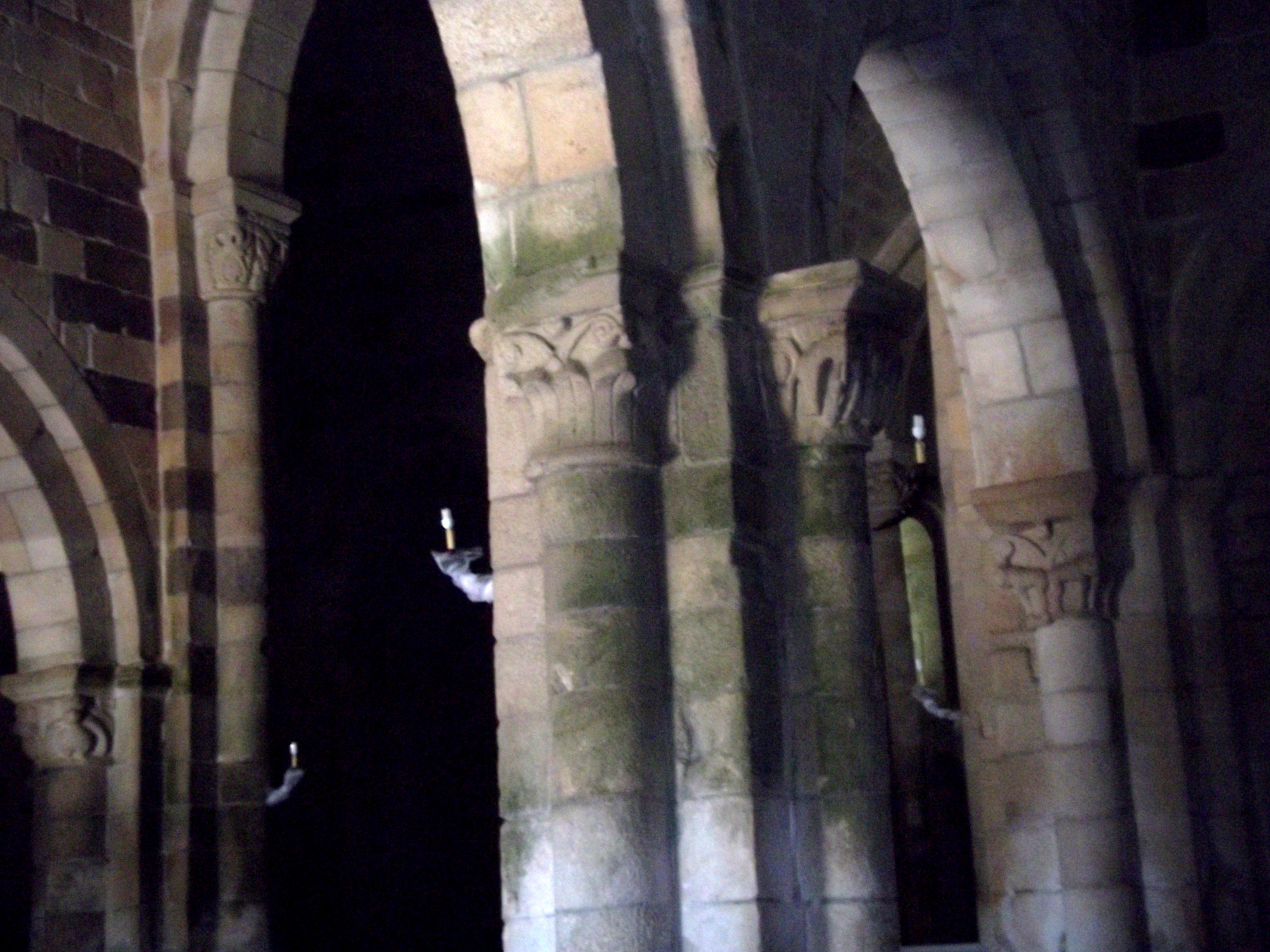
Walking inside the Monastery of Rates's rustic church shows a rich legacy of Romanesque art. The temple is preserved without much interference since the Middle Ages.

Rates is considered a central site of the Portuguese Way and where pilgrims were most numerous. The way has been used since the Middle Ages and the ancient monastery of Rates (rebuilt in 1100) gained importance due to the legend of Saint Peter of Rates. On the way to the Rates Monastery there is the medieval Dom Zameiro Bridge. It was (re)built in 1185 for an easy cross of the Ave river by medieval pilgrims. It is part of Roman Via Veteris and known in the Middle Ages as Karraria Antiqua (the old way); as such the bridge has Roman origin.

The legend holds that Saint James ordained Peter as the first bishop of Braga in the year AD 44. Peter died as a martyr while attempting to convert local pagans to Christianity. The temple held a cadaver, which people believed was Saint Peter of Rates. The cadaver was transferred to Braga Cathedral in 1552. Rates is also the location of the first modern pilgrim hostel (Albergue) in the Portuguese way, before others opened up in the region.

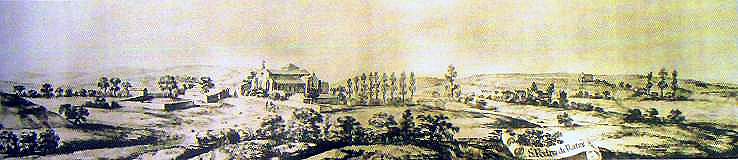
Rates in 1669 by Pier Maria Baldi, drawn during the pilgrimage of future Grand Duke Cosimo III de' Medici.

== Cávado river crossing ==
After leaving the monastery, the crossing of Cávado River was made using barges landing in Barca do Lago, which literally means "Lake's barge". The river was known in antiquity as Celadus. The Brotherhood of Barca do Lago stated in 1635: "This passage is very popular and it is for more than 400 years in our peaceful possession". The Portuguese King Sancho II made the crossing there during a pilgrimage in 1244 and centuries later King Manuel I did the same in 1502. Currently, the crossing which replaces the barges in both the Coastal and the Coastal derivation of the central way is made through Ponte de Fão, built in 1892. A pilgrims' barge in Barco do Lago was reinstituted for recreational pilgrimages, with a replica of the "Barca de Carga" (Cargo's Barge) being launched in 2017. For pilgrims preferring the inland route, the crossing is made at the Medieval Bridge of Barcelos, constructed between 1325 and 1328.

== Neiva river crossing ==
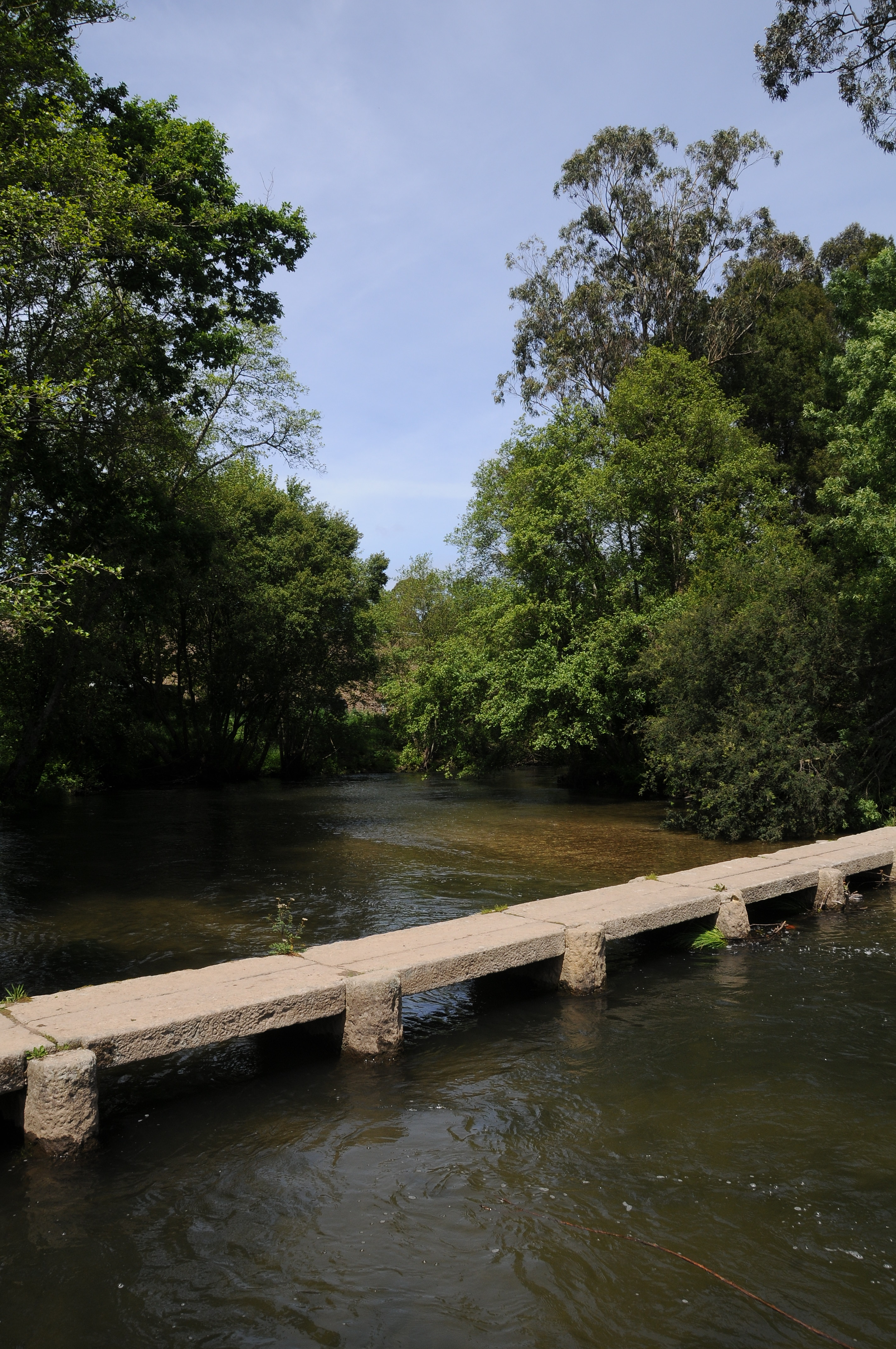
Neiva river footbridge in Antas, Esposende.

From Barca do Lago pilgrims head to the Neiva Castle. Currently lost, the Neiva was a Castro culture hillfort and early medieval castle that already existed when Afonso I of Portugal became king. It was located after crossing the Neiva river, known in antiquity as the Nebis, named after the pagan river goddess Nabia. Today, in the area, there's the Albergue de São Miguel in the locality of Marinhas in Esposende, prior to the crossing and the Monastery of São Romão de Neiva (1022), located after the crossing.

== Lima river crossing ==
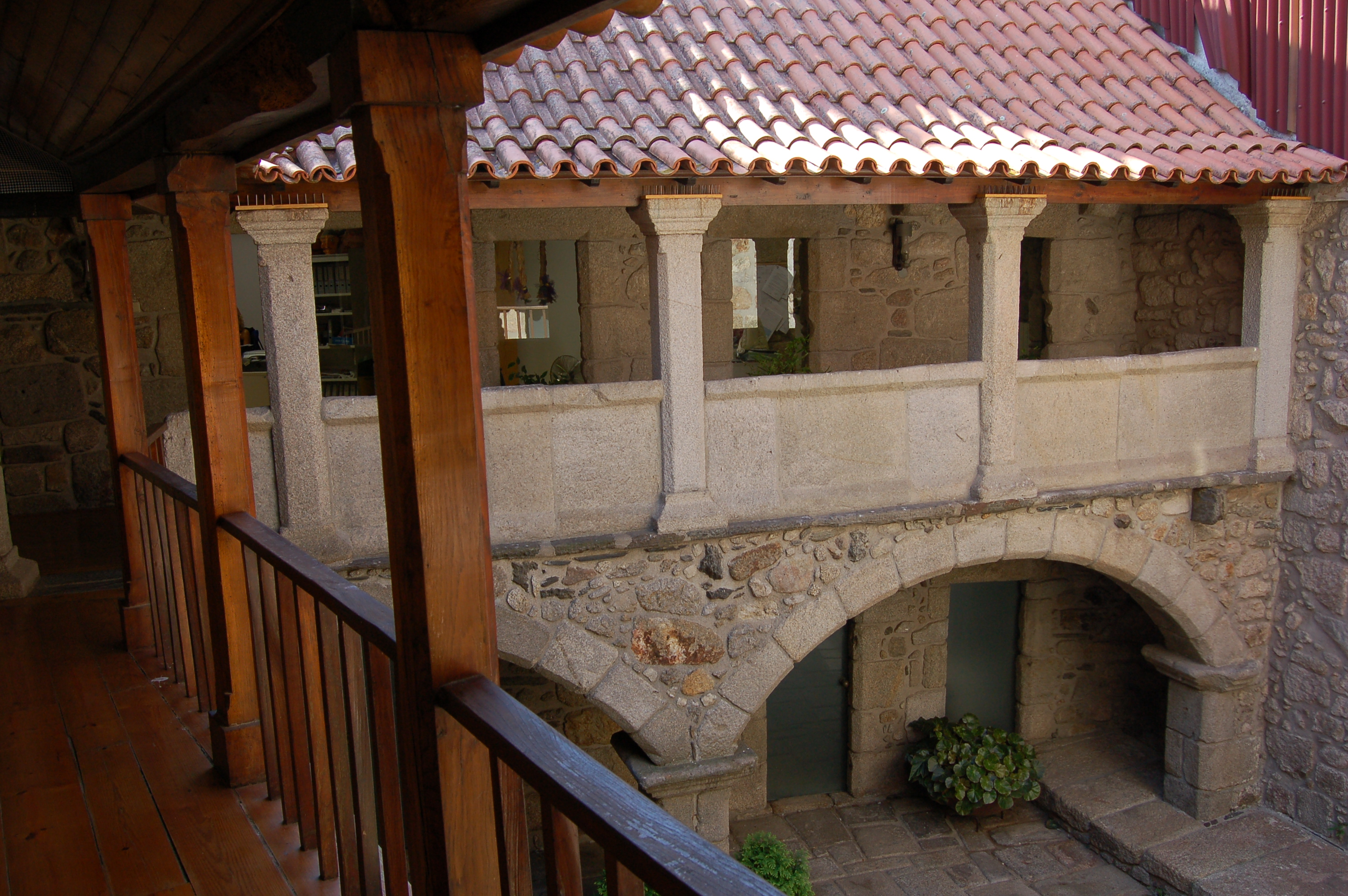
The Hospital Velho as seen from the inside.

The crossing of the Lima River is made over the Eiffel bridge (1878) in the Coastal way, and previously by barge. The bridge and the town of Viana do Castelo are signed by the sighting of the Monument-Temple of Santa Luzia (1904) over a hilltop. The Lantern tower of the sanctuary is where the pilgrim can see most of one's route in one of the most iconic views of Northern Portugal. Pilgrims were treated in the Old Hospital (Hospital Velho) of Viana do Castelo, an ancient hostel for pilgrims from early 15th century.

In Classical antiquity, the Lima was said to have properties of memory loss due to events in an ancient battle there between the Turduli and the Celts. Also known in antiquity as Oblivion, Strabo compared it to the mythological Lethe, the river of unmindfulness. Two ancient canoes found in Lanheses (Viana do Castelo) and the itinerary of the Loca Maritima Roman way suggest that to be the site where the Roman soldiers were fearful of the crossing during the conquest of the region in 136 BC.

For the inland route, Ponte de Lima's bridge is used. The later bridge possibly dates to the 1st century and was rebuilt in 1125. One of the most tiring parts of the Portuguese inland Way is in the Labruja hills in Ponte de Lima, which are hard to cross.

== Minho river crossing ==
The Camino winds its way inland until it reaches the Portugal-Spain border at the Minho river through Valença, where international bridges exist, heading for a 108 km walk to Santiago, passing through Tui.

In the coastal way, the way from Viana do Castelo leads to Caminha, reaching the town's Gothic keep of former Caminha fortifications and since the 17th century the town's clock tower. The contemporary crossing of the Minho on the coastal way makes use of the ferryboat in Caminha. The ferryboat heads to A Guarda, just across the river, in Galicia. From there pilgrims reach the seaside Monastery of Santa María de Oya (1185), located in Oia. The way reaches Redondela, where the coastal way merges with the central way, leading to the medieval city of Pontevedra and, after crossing the Ulla river, there is the town of Padrón. This is 25 km from the final destination, Santiago de Compostela Cathedral (1122), the legendary burial place of Saint James the Great, one of the apostles of Jesus Christ.

== In Spain ==
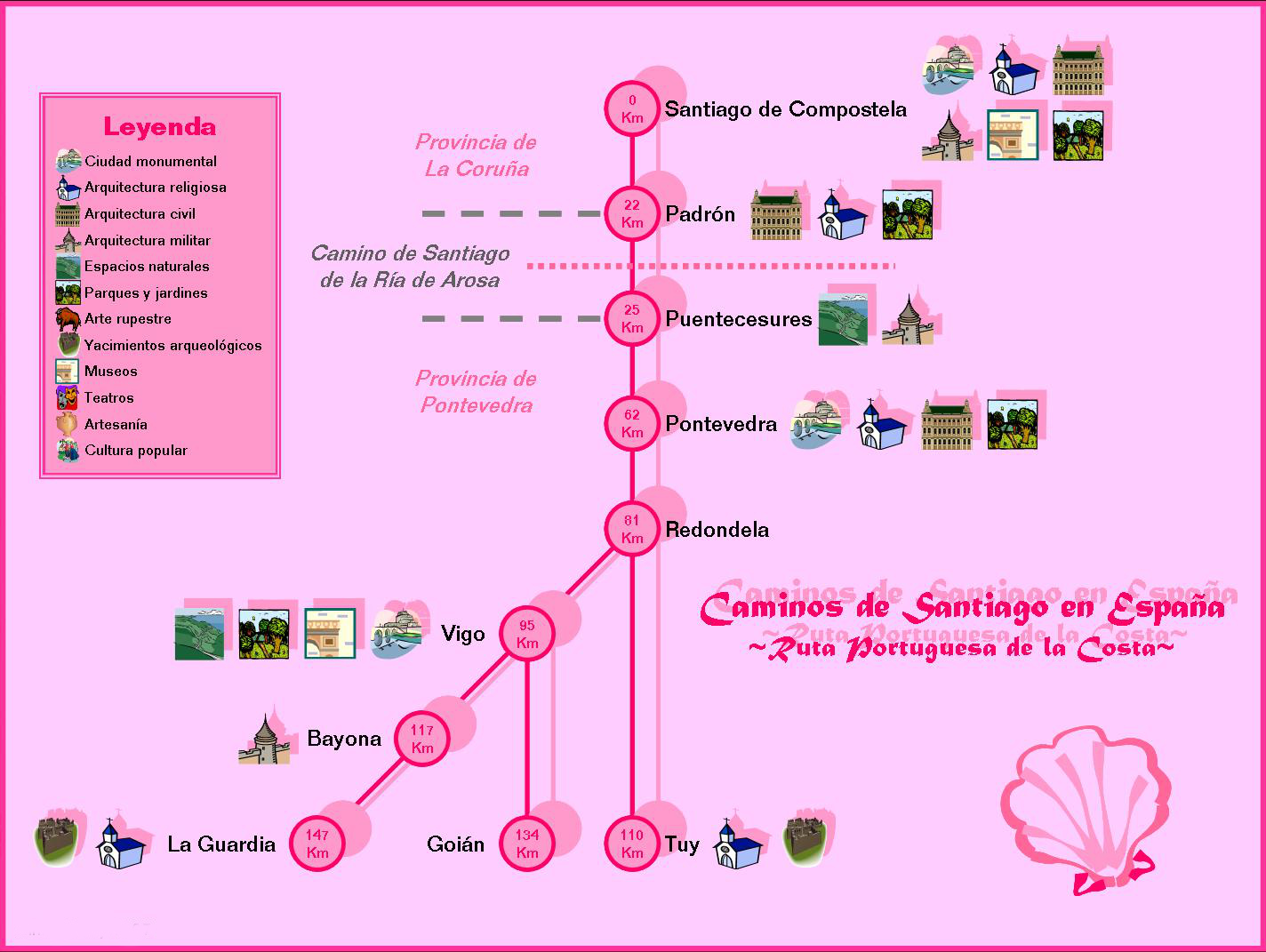
Map of the Coastel route from Tui

| Starting point | Province of Galicia | Distances (km) | |
| Starting point | Province of Galicia | Stage distance | To Santiago |
|---|---|---|---|
| Tui | Pontevedra | &nbsp; | 107 |
| Ribadelouro | Pontevedra | 6 | | 101 |
| O Porriño | Pontevedra | 7 | | 94 |
| Mos | Pontevedra | 5 | | 89 |
| Enxertade (Mos) | Pontevedra | 5 | | 84 |
| Redondela | Pontevedra | 6 | | 78 |
| O Viso (Redondela) | Pontevedra | 3 | | 75 |
| Ponte Sampaio | Pontevedra | 4 | | 71 |
| Pontevedra | Pontevedra | 12 | | 59 |
| Alba (Pontevedra) | Pontevedra | 3 | | 56 |
| Tibo (Caldas de Reis) | Pontevedra | 16 | | 40 |
| Caldas de Reis | Pontevedra | 1 | | 39 |
| Carracedo (Caldas de Reis) | Pontevedra | 6 | | 33 |
| Valga | Pontevedra | 4 | | 29 |
| Pontecesures | Pontevedra | 4 | | 25 |
| Padrón | A Coruña | 3 | | 22 |
| Iria Flavia | A Coruña | 3 | | 19 |
| Church of Escravitude (Padrón) | A Coruña | 3 | | 16 |
| Rúa dos Francos (Teo, A Coruña) | A Coruña | 7 | | 9 |
| Santiago de Compostela | A Coruña | 9 | | 0 |

== See also ==
- Castle Lupario
