= Ángel Arcos =

Spanish footballer (born 2006)

Personal information
- Full name: Ángel Arcos Cadilla
- Date of birth: 18 April 2006 (age 20)
- Place of birth: O Rosal, Spain
- Height: 1.84 m (6 ft 0 in)
- Position: Winger

Team information
- Current team: Celta B
- Number: 11

Youth career
- Ribera
- 2019–2024: Celta

Senior career*
Years	Team	Apps	(Gls)
2024–	Celta B	66	(4)
2025–	Celta	0	(0)

International career
2025–	Spain U19	3	(0)
- * Club domestic league appearances and goals as of 15 August 2026

Ángel Arcos Cadilla (born 18 April 2006) is a Spanish professional footballer who plays as a left winger for RC Celta Fortuna.

== Club career ==
Born in O Rosal, Pontevedra, Galicia, Arcos joined RC Celta de Vigo's youth setup in 2019, from UD Ribera. He made his senior debut with the reserves on 11 May 2024, coming on as a second-half substitute in a 3–0 Primera Federación home win over CF Rayo Majadahonda.

Arcos made his first team debut on 27 November 2025, replacing Bryan Zaragoza in a 3–2 away loss to PFC Ludogorets Razgrad, for the season's UEFA Europa League.

== International career ==
On 9 January 2025, Arcos was called up to the Spain national under-19 team.
