= O Baixo Miño =

Coordinates: 41°58′58″N 8°47′03″W

- Comarca
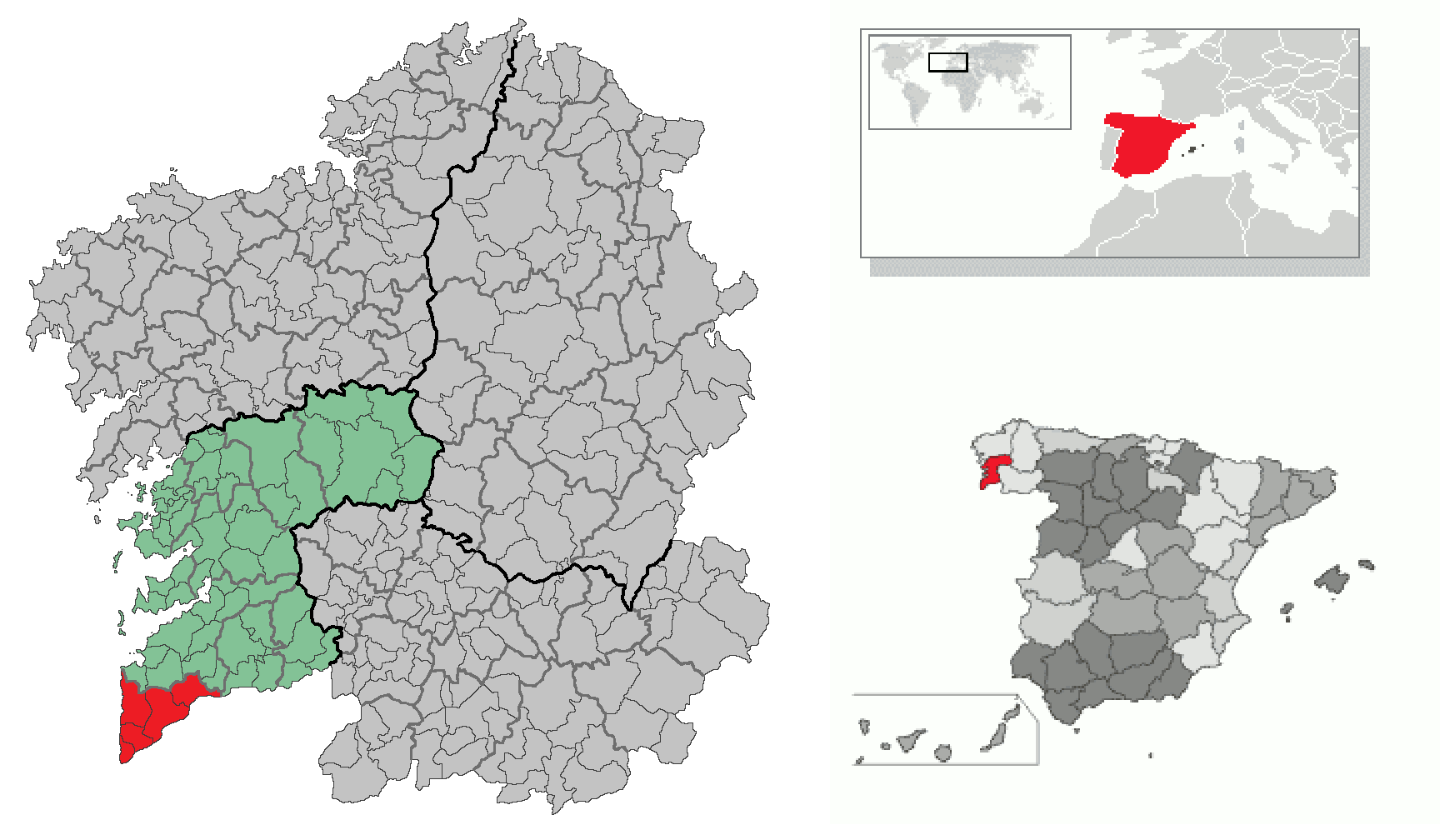
- Location of the comarca of O Baixo Miño within Galicia.
- Country: Spain
- Autonomous community: Galicia
- Province: Pontevedra
- Capital: Tui
- Municipalities: A Guarda, O Rosal, Oia, Tomiño, Tui

Area
  - Total: 315.1 km^{2} (121.7 sq mi)

Population (2018)
  - Total: 49,646
  - Density: 157.6/km^{2} (408.1/sq mi)
- Demonym: miñoto

O Baixo Miño (English: Lower Miño, Spanish: Bajo Miño, Portuguese: Baixo Minho) is a comarca in the Galician province of Pontevedra. The area covers 315.1 km^{2}, and the overall population of this comarca was 50,978 at the 2011 Census; the latest official estimate (as at the start of 2018) was 49,646. To the west of O Baixo Miño lies the Atlantic Ocean and to its southeast is the Minho River, which forms a natural boundary with Portugal.

== Important Sites and Events ==
The region is a socially, culturally and religiously rich place. There is the Minho Estuary, which has many species of birds. And every August there is the cultural showcase of Festas do Monte. Another interesting site in the region is the Monte Aloia, Galicia's first natural park.

Map of the Pontevedra Province, showing the Baixo Miño comarca and its constituent municipalities.

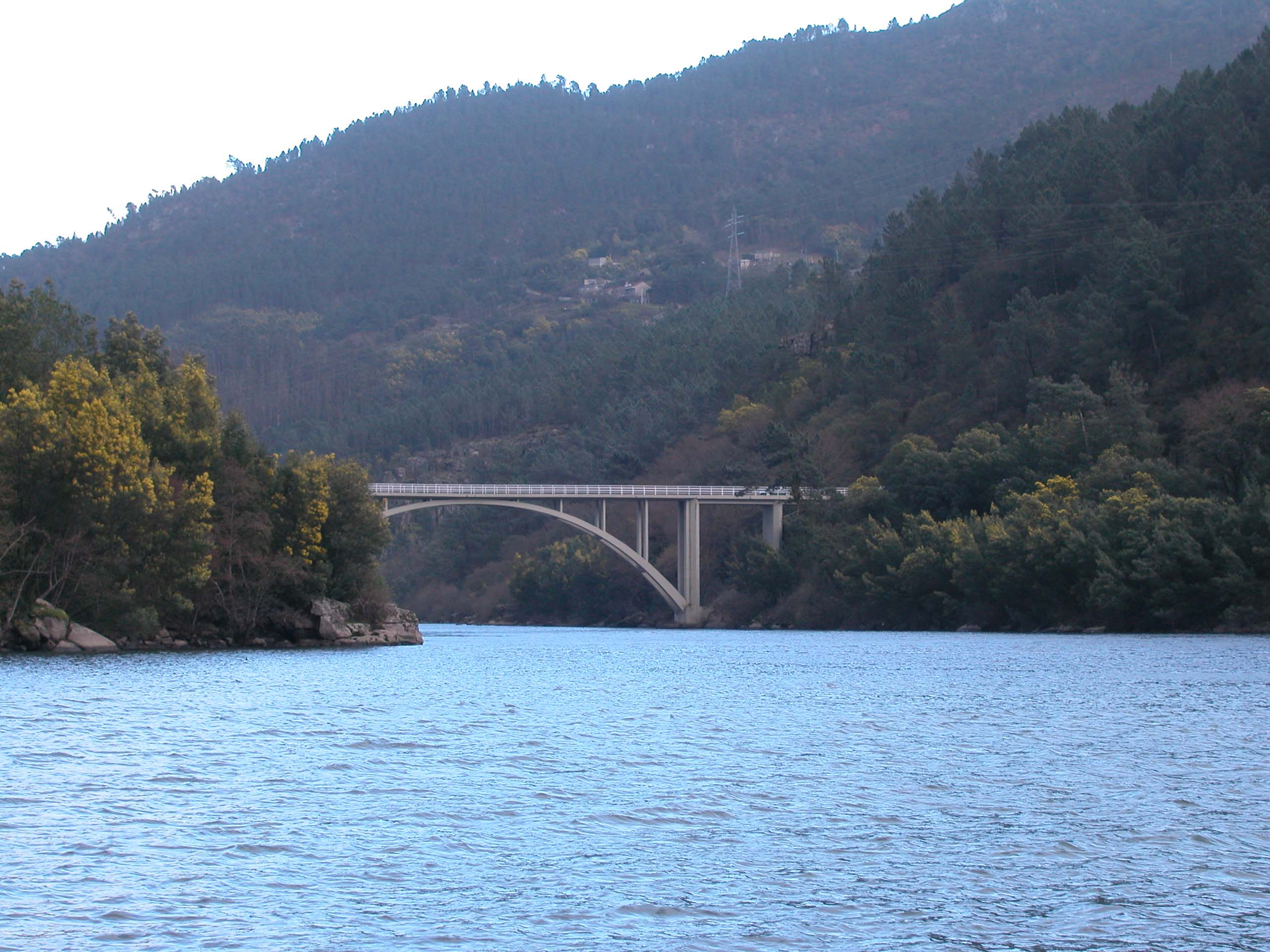
Minho River

== Municipalities ==
The comarca comprises the following five municipalities:

Name of municipality	Population (2001)	Population (2011)	Population (2018)
A Guarda	9,835	10,419	10,013
Oia	2,995	3,100	3,018
O Rosal	5,923	6,519	6,249
Tomiño	11,371	13,645	13,464
Tui	16,042	17,295	16,902
Totals	46,166	50,978	49,646
