= Royal Monastery of Santa María de Oia =

Monastery in Pontevedra, Spain

Coordinates: 42.0000°N 8.8667°W

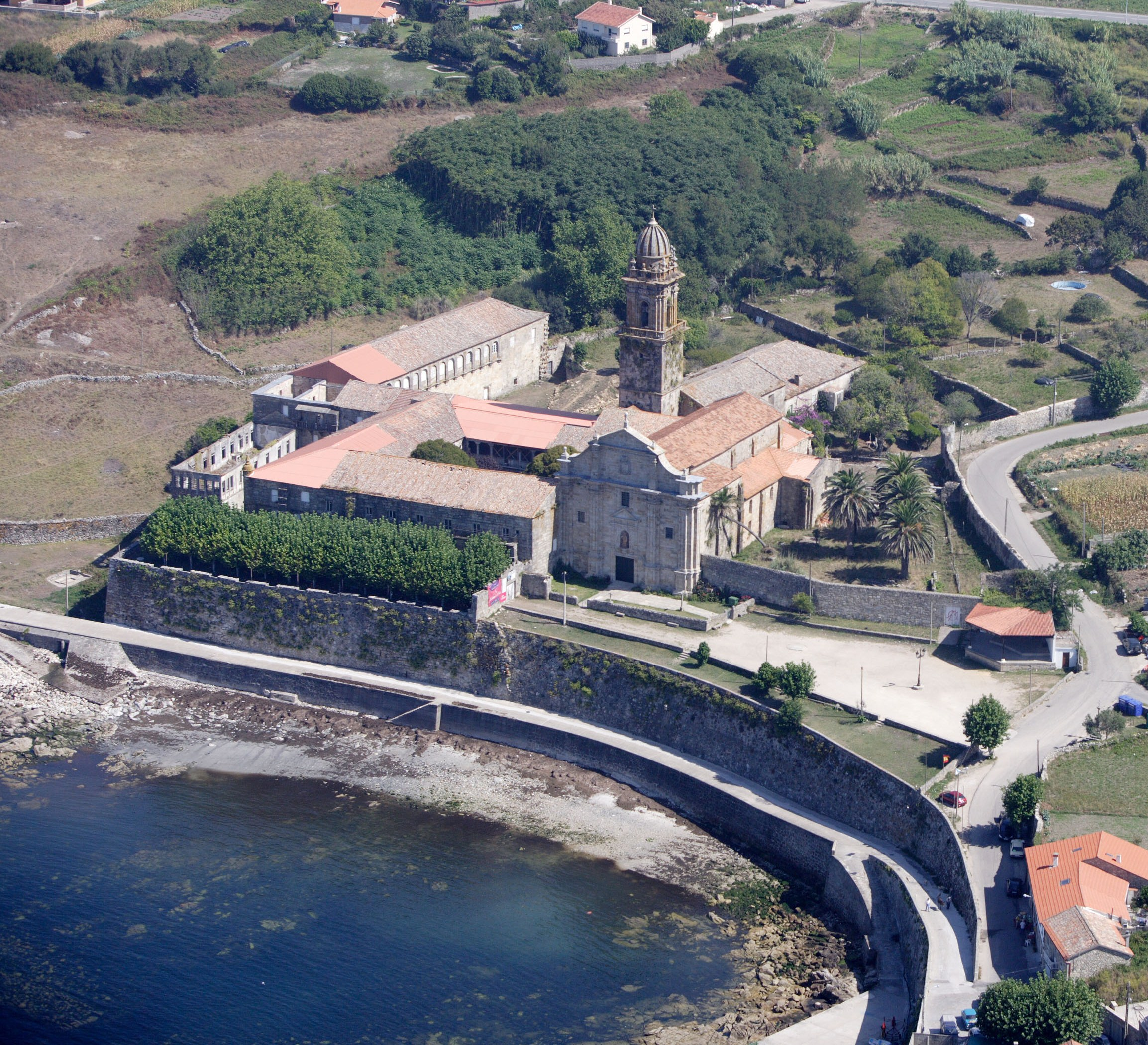
Royal Monastery of Santa Maria de Oia

The Royal Monastery of Santa Maria de Oia is a former Cistercian monastery, founded in 1137. It is located in the province of Pontevedra, in the autonomous community of Galicia, Spain. It was declared a Bien de Interés Cultural landmark in 1931. The monastery is listed in the Register of Assets of Cultural Interest of Galicia in the list corresponding to the Province of Pontevedra, in the municipality of Oia, Spain.

It lies on the Portuguese Way route of the Camino pilgrim path to Santiago de Compostela.

== See also ==
- List of Jesuit sites
