= Tomiño =

- Municipality
- Concello de Tomiño
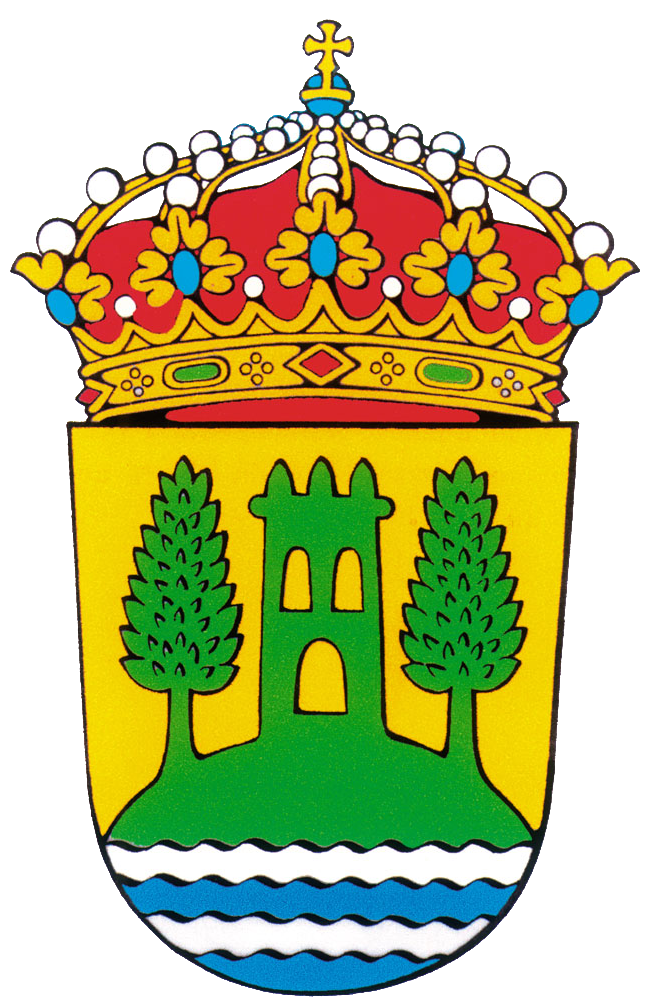
- Coat of arms

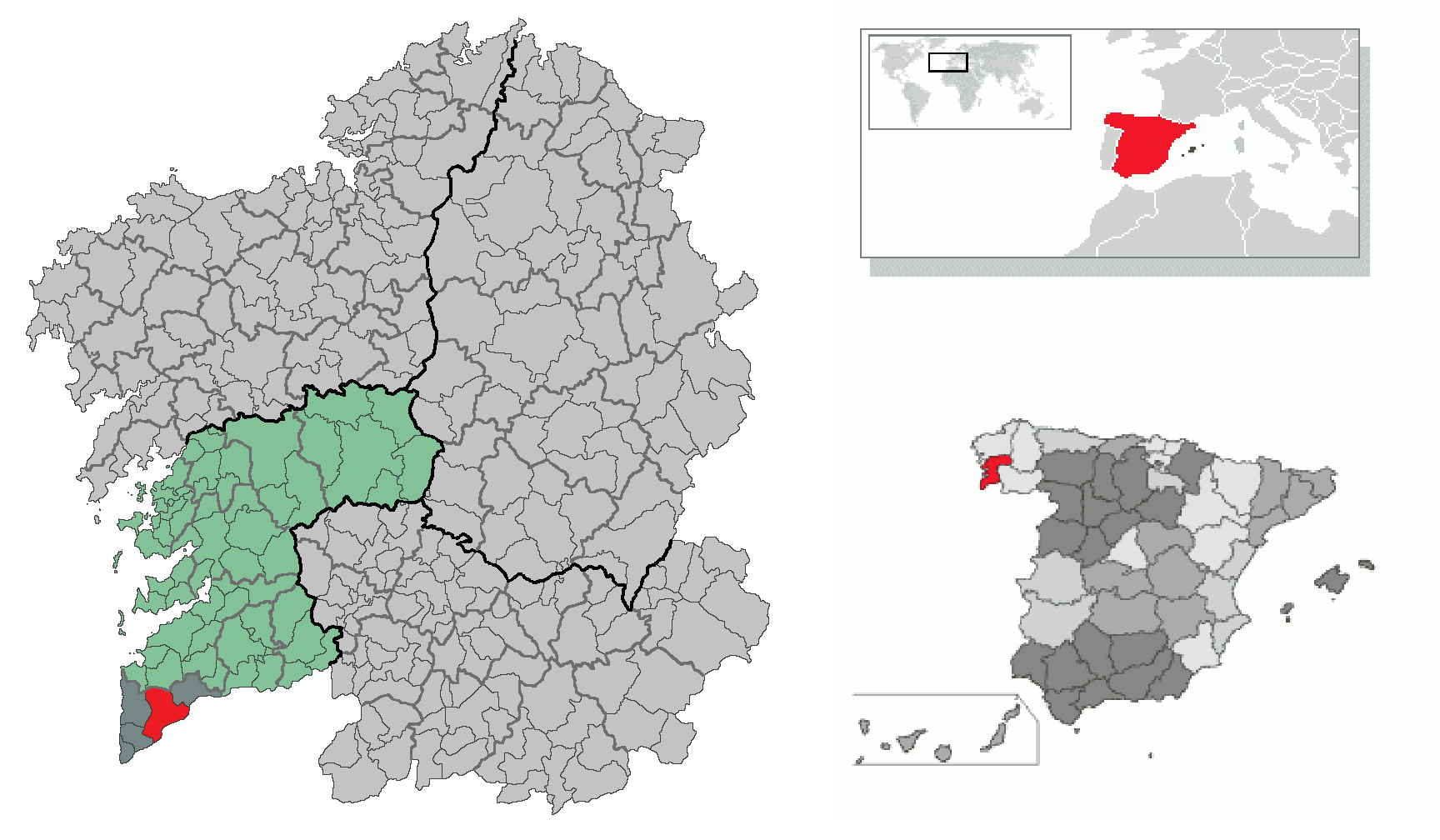
- Coordinates: 41°59′N 8°43′W
- Country: Spain
- Autonomous community: Galicia
- Province: Pontevedra
- Comarca: O Baixo Miño

Government
  - Alcalde: Sandra González Álvarez (BNG)

Area
  - Total: 106.51 km^{2} (41.12 sq mi)
- Elevation: 303 m (994 ft)

Population (2025-01-01)
  - Total: 13,738
  - Density: 128.98/km^{2} (334.06/sq mi)
- Demonym(s): Tomiñés, -esa
- Time zone: UTC+1 (CET)
  - Summer (DST): UTC+2 (CEST)
- Postal code: 36740
- Website: Official website

Tomiño is a municipality in the province of Pontevedra in the autonomous community of Galicia, in Spain. It is situated in the comarca of O Baixo Miño. It is located on the Miño River.

== Politics ==
Local election results in Tomiño
Party	2007	2011	2015
Galician Nationalist Bloc (BNG)	4	9	10
People's Party (PP)	6	6	5
Socialists' Party of Galicia (PSOE-PSdeG)	2	1	1
Centrists of Tomiño (CdT)	3	0	2
Alternativa Tomiñesa (ALT)	3	0	2
Liberal Democratic Centre (CDL)	0	1	0

== See also ==
- List of municipalities in Pontevedra
