= Oia, Spain =

Coordinates: 42°00′N 8°52′W

Oia
- Coat of arms

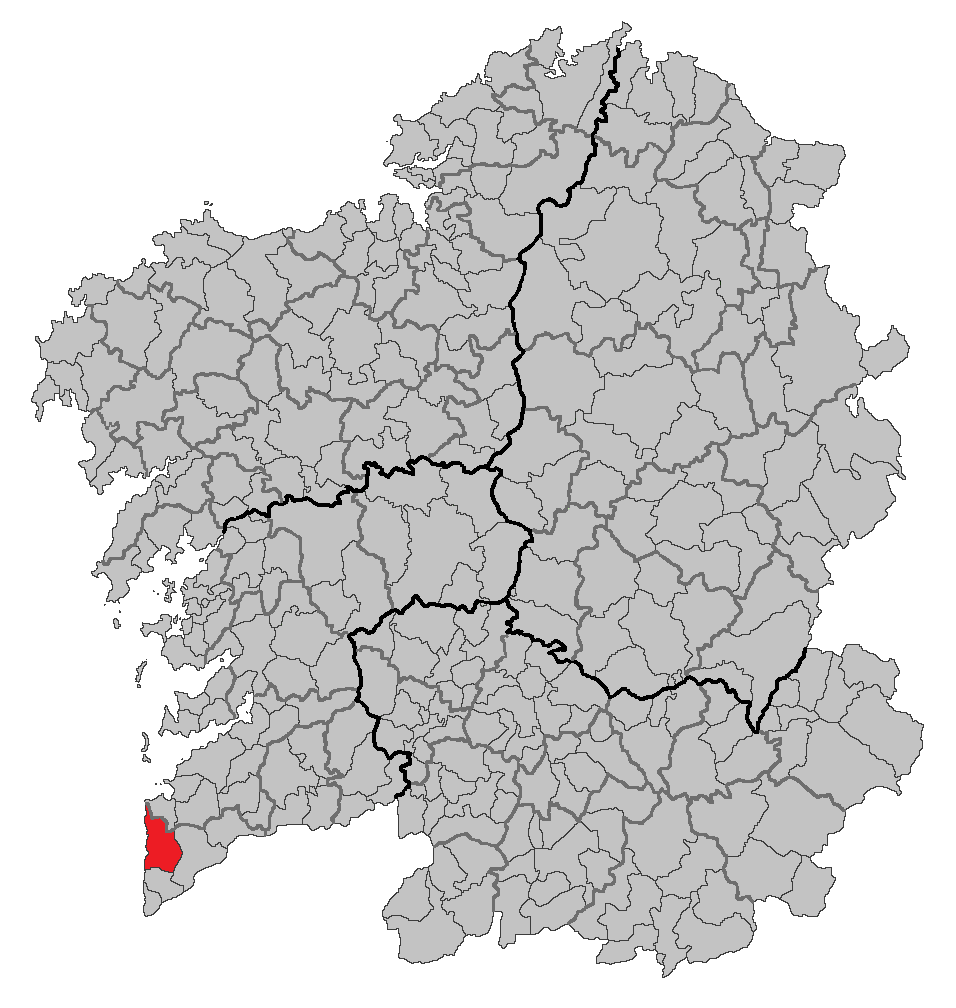
- Location of Oia within Galicia
- Country: Spain
- Autonomous community: Galicia
- Province: Pontevedra
- Comarca: O Baixo Miño

Population (2025-01-01)
  - Total: 3,062
- Time zone: UTC+1 (CET)
  - Summer (DST): UTC+2 (CET)

Oia (in Spanish 'Oya') is a municipality in the province of Pontevedra in the autonomous community of Galicia, in Spain. It is situated in the comarca of Bajo Miño. The Royal Monastery of Santa María de Oia is located in Oia.

== See also ==
- List of municipalities in Pontevedra
