= O Rosal =

Coordinates: 41°56′8″N 8°49′30″W

Concello de O Rosal
- Municipality
- Flag Coat of arms

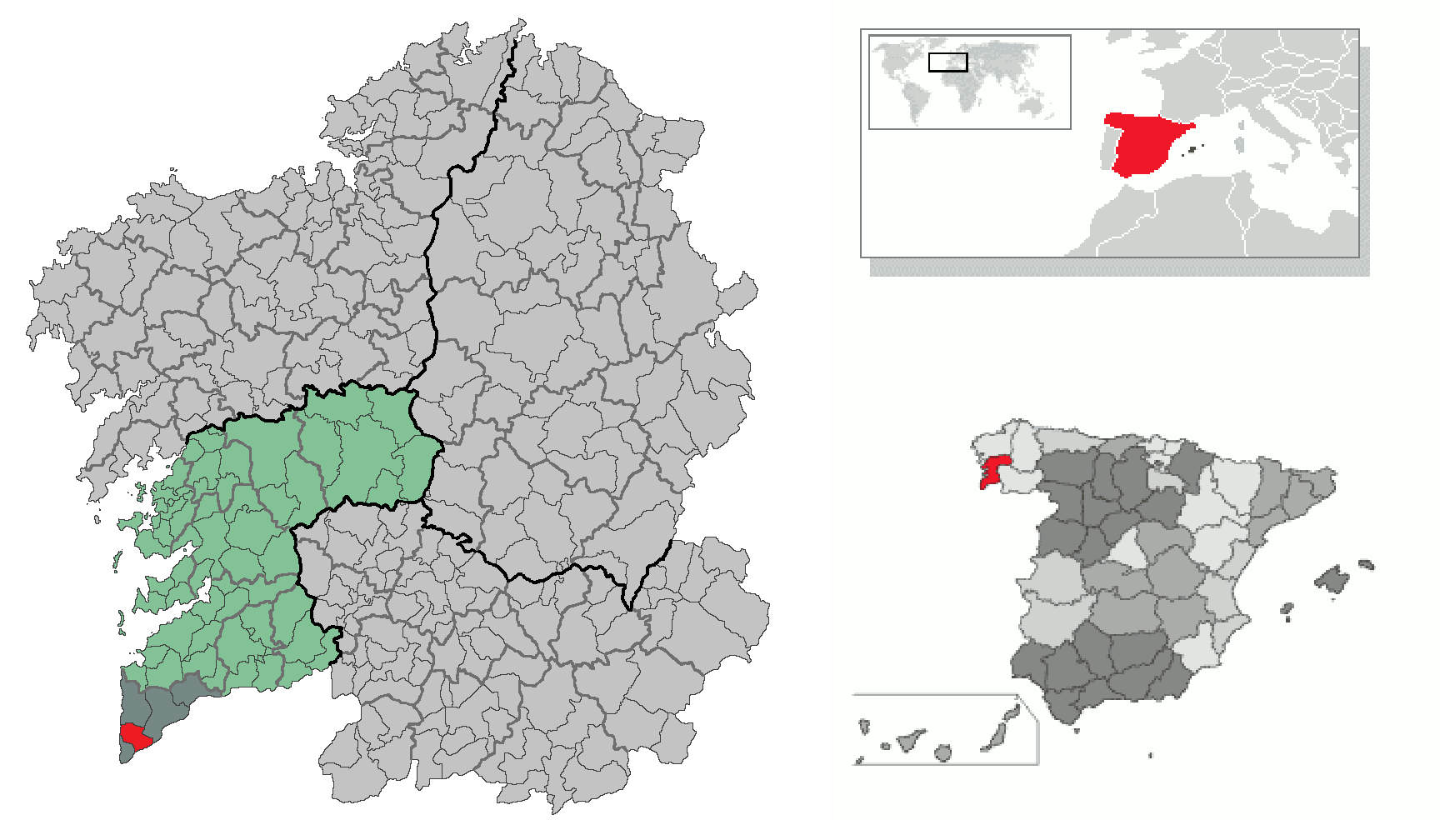
- Situation of O Rosal within Galicia
- Country: Spain
- Autonomous community: Galicia
- Province: Pontevedra
- Comarca: O Baixo Miño
- Parroquias: List: As Eiras; O Rosal; San Miguel de Tabagón; Tabagón

Government
  - Alcalde (Mayor): Ánxela Fernandez Callís (BNG)

Area
  - Total: 44.1 km^{2} (17.0 sq mi)

Population (2025-01-01)
  - Total: 6,548
  - Density: 148/km^{2} (385/sq mi)
- Time zone: UTC+1 (CET)
  - Summer (DST): UTC+2 (CET)
- Postal code: 36770
- Website: www.orosal.es

O Rosal is a municipality in the province of Pontevedra in the autonomous community of Galicia, in Spain. It is situated in the comarca of O Baixo Miño. The municipality has 44.1 km^{2} and had 6531 inhabitants, according to the 2013 census (INE).

== See also ==
- List of municipalities in Pontevedra
