= Tui, Pontevedra =

Tui
- Municipality
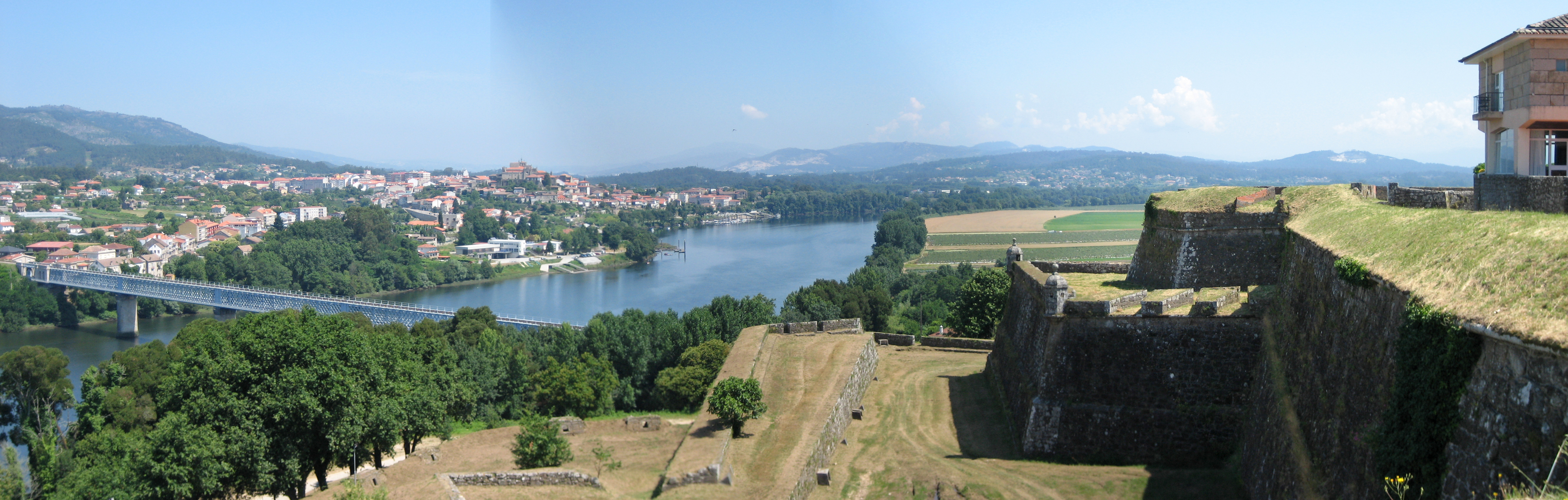
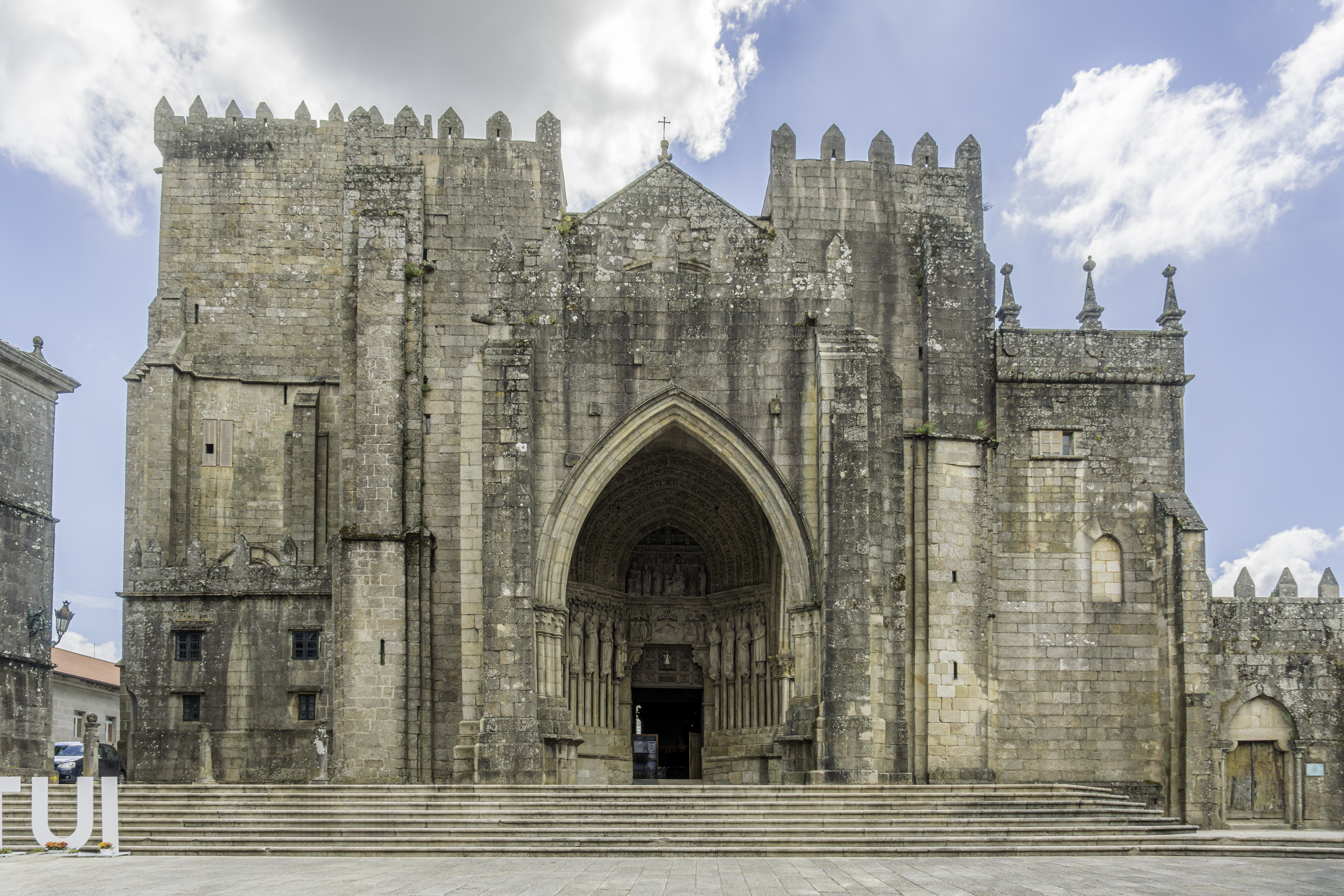
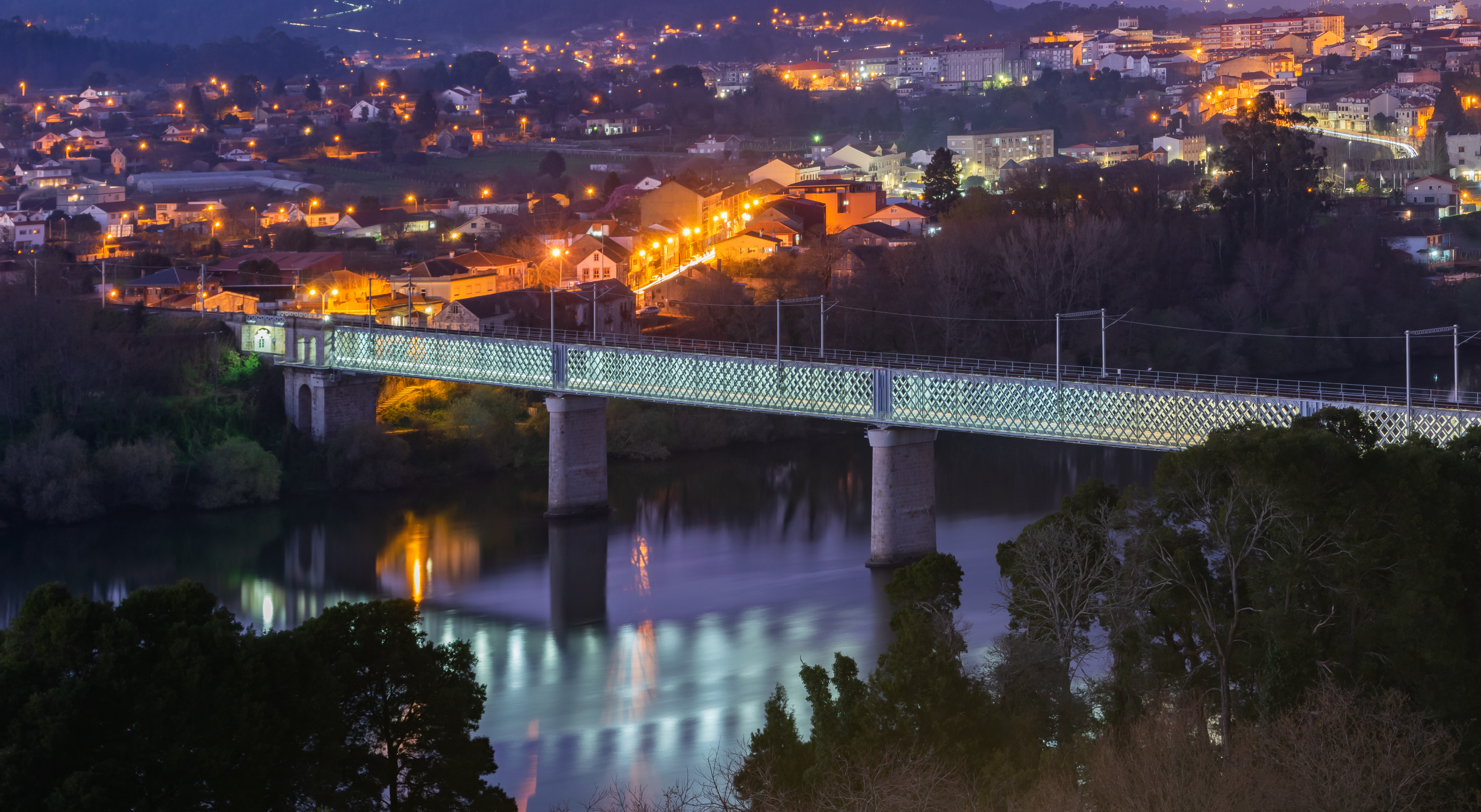
- Panoramic view Tui Cathedral International Bridge View as seen from Portugal.

- Flag Coat of arms
- Location of Tui
- Coordinates: 42°2′53″N 8°38′40″W
- Country: Spain
- Region: Galicia
- Province: Pontevedra
- County: O Baixo Miño
- Parishes: Areas, Baldráns, Caldelas de Tui, Guillarei, Malvas, Paramos, Pazos de Reis, Pexegueiro, Randufe, Rebordáns, Ribadelouro, Tui

Government
  - Type: Concello
  - Body: Concello de Tui
  - Mayor: Enrique Cabaleiro González (PSdeG–PSOE)

Area
  - Total: 68.3 km^{2} (26.4 sq mi)
- Elevation: 44 m (144 ft)
- Highest elevation (Alto de San Xiao): 631 m (2,070 ft)

Population (2025-01-01)
  - Total: 17,468 ▲
  - Rank: 30th in Galicia
  - Density: 256/km^{2} (662/sq mi)
- Demonym(s): Tydean tudense
- Time zone: UTC+1 (CET)
  - Summer (DST): UTC+2 (CET)
- Post code: 36700
- Area code: +34 986
- INE code: 36055
- Website: Official website

Tui (Galician pronunciation: [ˈtuj]; is a town and municipality in the province of Pontevedra, in the autonomous community of Galicia, Spain. It is located in the comarca of O Baixo Miño on the right bank of the Miño River, facing the Portuguese town of Valença. The municipality of Tui is composed of 11 parishes: Randufe, Malvas, Pexegueiro, Areas, Pazos de Reis, Rebordáns, Ribadelouro, Guillarei, Paramos, Baldráns and Caldelas.

Two bridges connect Tuy and Valença: Tui International Bridge (known in Portugal as Valença International Bridge or "Friendship Bridge"), completed in 1878 under the direction of Pelayo Mancebo, and a modern one from the 1990s. Both Portugal and Spain being signatories of the Schengen Treaty, there are normally no formalities in crossing what is the busiest border-point in northern Portugal.

== History ==
=== Prehistory ===
The Tui area was inhabited since prehistoric times. Evidence of this are the sites found during construction of the highway Vigo-Tui, on the border with Porriño, dating from the Lower Paleolithic period which was the oldest in Galicia.

The fertile valley of the Minho and its magnificent natural conditions allowed the Tudense territory to accommodate human settlement from the earliest times. The vestiges are from the Palaeolithic period (20,000 BC) in the fluvial terraces of the river Minho and Louro and from the Neolithic period (5,000 BC) are the Carrasqueira ax or megalithic monuments (Anta - Areas). The introduction of metallurgy (4,000 BC) left testimonies like the helmet of bronze Caldelas axes (now in the Tudense Diocesan Museum) or engravings of Randufe.

=== Middle Ages ===
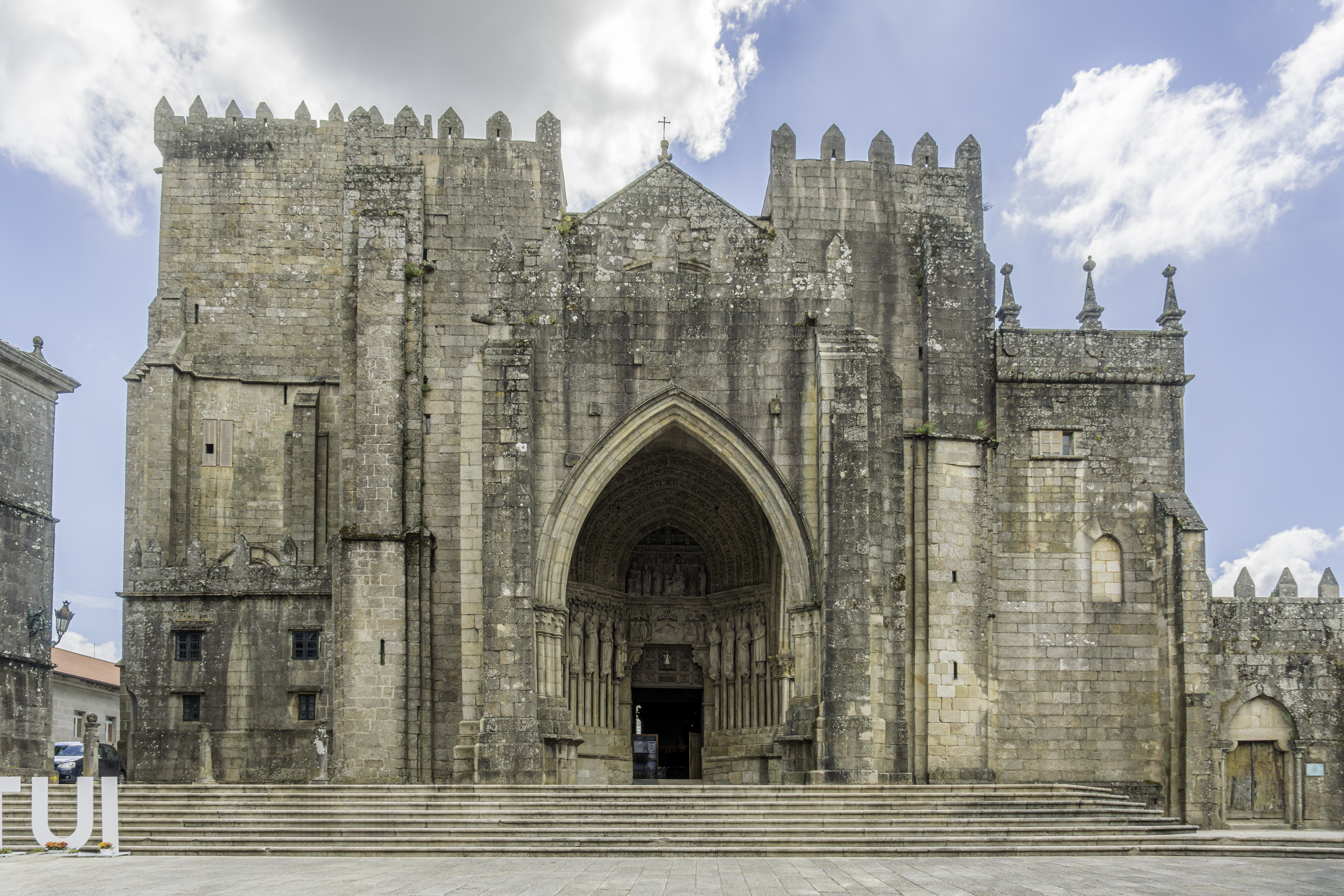
Tui Cathedral

Its original local name, Tude, was mentioned by Pliny the Elder and by Ptolemy in the first century AD. It became an episcopal see no later than the 6th century, during the Suevic rule, when Bishop Anila went to the second Council of Braga. Later, in the Visigothic period, it briefly served as the capital of a Galician subkingdom under king Wittiza. After the campaigns of Alfonso I of Asturias (739–757) against the Moors, the town lay abandoned in the largely empty buffer zone between Moors and Christians, being later part of the "Repoblación" (repopulation) effort carried out a century later, during the reign of Ordoño I of Asturias (850–866). In the 10th century, it was raided by Vikings, being abandoned and later re-established in its current location. In the 12th century it was taken from the Moors by Alphonso VII. Today the town centre is near the Inn of San Telmo.

On top of the hill, the cathedral (11th–13th century, and restored between the 15th and 19th centuries) preserves Romanesque elements in its main vestibule, and the Gothic period in the western vestibule. The town has two museums, one dedicated to archaeology and sacred art, while the other is the diocesan museum.

As a frontier fortress the town played an important part in the wars between Portugal and Castile.

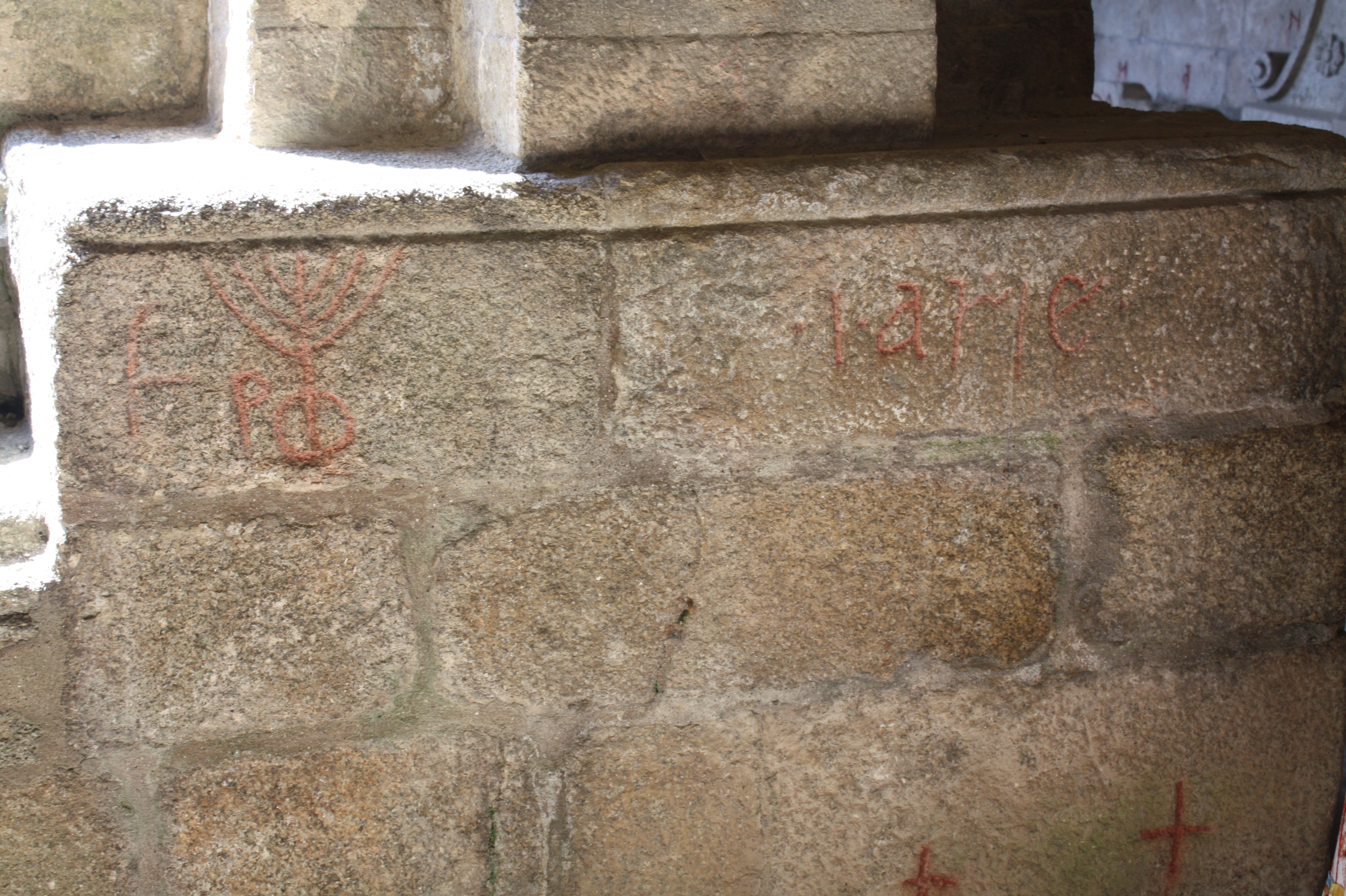
A menorah engraved in the Tui Cathedral.

Historically, there was a Jewish community in Tui during the Middle Ages. There is a menorah engraved in the Tui Cathedral, symbolizing the relationship between Jews and Christians in Tui.

== Economy ==
Industry in the city of Tui is gradually gaining weight, as with the construction of industrial estate areas, many national and international companies have established production facilities there. Yet the industry is not more than 20% of GDP in the city.

Construction, one of the fastest growing sectors of Tui, estimated at 4.2% in 2005. The trend shows an increase in residential construction, driven by the slight slowdown in the increase of the cost of living.

== Tourism ==
Although Tui is just north of the border with Portugal, a shortened version of the Portuguese Way of the Camino de Santiago commences there, and as the distance is 116 kilometres (72 mi), this walk is long enough for pilgrims to obtain a pilgrim's certificate.

== Politics ==
Local election results in Tui
Party	2007	2011	2015
People's Party (PP)	7	9	4
Spanish Socialist Workers' Party (PSOE-PSdeG)	6	4	3
Converxencia Vinteún (C21)	-	1	2
Alternativa Tudense (AT)	4	3	2
Galician Nationalist Bloc (BNG)	2	2	2
Ciudadanos Tudenses (CsT)	-	-	2
Son de Tui (SON)	-	-	1
Tui Popular Alternative (APTUI)	-	-	1

== International relations ==
Tui is twinned with the municipality of Fromista, in Castile (1985), and the German town of Versmold, Germany (2013).

== See also ==
- List of municipalities in Pontevedra
