= 2026–27 UEFA Europa League league phase =

International football club competition in Europe

The 2026–27 UEFA Europa League league phase began on 16 September 2026 and will end on 28 January 2027. A total of 36 teams are competing in the league phase to decide the 24 places in the knockout phase of the 2026–27 UEFA Europa League.

Ararat-Armenia, Bournemouth, Celje, Crystal Palace, Jagiellonia Białystok, Lillestrøm, NEC, OFI, Sunderland and Torreense are making their debut appearances since the introduction of the group stage (although NEC had previously appeared in the UEFA Cup group stage). Ararat-Armenia, Bournemouth, Lillestrøm, OFI, Sunderland and Torreense are making their debut appearances in a major UEFA competition group or league phase, with Bournemouth and Torreense qualifying for European football for the first time in their history. Ararat-Armenia became the first team from Armenia to play in the Europa League group stage or league phase.

A total of 22 national associations are being represented in the league phase.

== Format ==
Each team will play eight matches, four at home and four away, against eight different opponents, with all 36 teams ranked in a single league table (known as the Swiss system). Teams were separated into four pots based on their 2026 UEFA club coefficients, and each team will play two teams from each of the four pots – one at home and one away. The top eight teams in the standings will receive a bye to the round of 16. The teams ranked from 9th to 24th will contest the knockout phase play-offs, with the teams ranked from 9th to 16th seeded for the draw. Teams ranked from 25th to 36th will be eliminated from European competition.

=== Tiebreakers ===
Teams are ranked according to points (3 points for a win, 1 point for a draw, 0 points for a loss). If two or more teams are equal on points upon completion of the league phase, the following tiebreaking criteria will be applied, in the order given, to determine their rankings:

While the league phase is in progress, teams are ranked according to criteria 1–5 only, and if still tied, will be given equal ranking and sorted alphabetically. Criteria 6–10 will only be used after the final matches take place.

1. Goal difference;
2. Goals scored;
3. Away goals scored;
4. Wins;
5. Away wins;
6. Higher number of points obtained collectively by league phase opponents;
7. Superior collective goal difference of league phase opponents;
8. Higher number of goals scored collectively by league phase opponents;
9. Lower disciplinary points total (direct red card or expulsion for two yellow cards in one match = 3 points, yellow card = 1 point);
10. UEFA club coefficient.

== Teams and seeding ==
The 36 teams were divided into four pots of nine teams each, with teams allocated to pots based on their 2026 UEFA club coefficients. The participants include:

- 13 teams which entered at this stage
- 12 winners of the play-off round
- 7 losers of the Champions League play-off round (5 from the Champions Path, 2 from the League Path)
- 4 losers of the Champions League third qualifying round (League Path)

Key to colours
Teams ranked 1 to 8 advance to the round of 16 as a seeded team
Teams ranked 9 to 16 advance to the knockout phase play-offs as a seeded team
Teams ranked 17 to 24 advance to the knockout phase play-offs as an unseeded team

Pot 1
| Team | Notes | Coeff. |
|---|---|---|
| (German Football Association) Bayer Leverkusen | | 105.000 |
| (Portuguese Football Federation) Benfica | | 90.000 |
| (Italian Football Federation) Juventus | | 72.250 |
| (Italian Football Federation) Milan | | 66.000 |
| (French Football Federation) Lyon | | 65.750 |
| (Royal Dutch Football Association) AZ | | 62.875 |
| (Hellenic Football Federation) Olympiacos | | 62.250 |
| (Royal Spanish Football Federation) Real Sociedad | | 57.000 |
| (French Football Federation) Marseille | | 54.000 |

Pot 2
| Team | Notes | Coeff. |
|---|---|---|
| (Hungarian Football Federation) Ferencváros | | 51.250 |
| (Football Association of the Czech Republic) Viktoria Plzeň | | 50.500 |
| (Royal Belgian Football Association) Union Saint-Gilloise | | 48.000 |
| (Croatian Football Federation) Dinamo Zagreb | | 46.500 |
| (Austrian Football Association) Red Bull Salzburg | | 45.000 |
| (Scottish Football Association) Celtic | | 44.000 |
| (Football Association of the Czech Republic) Sparta Prague | | 38.250 |
| (French Football Federation) Rennes | | 35.000 |
| (Royal Belgian Football Association) Anderlecht | | 30.750 |

Pot 3
| Team | Notes | Coeff. |
|---|---|---|
| (Austrian Football Association) Sturm Graz | | 28.000 |
| (Polish Football Association) Lech Poznań | | 27.250 |
| (The Football Association) Crystal Palace | | 23.903 |
| (The Football Association) Bournemouth | | 23.903 |
| (The Football Association) Sunderland | | 23.903 |
| (Football Association of Slovenia) Celje | | 23.000 |
| (Polish Football Association) Jagiellonia Białystok | | 22.000 |
| (Cyprus Football Association) Omonia | | 21.250 |
| (Royal Spanish Football Federation) Celta Vigo | | 19.409 |

Pot 4
| Team | Notes | Coeff. |
|---|---|---|
| (German Football Association) TSG Hoffenheim | | 18.580 |
| (Turkish Football Federation) Beşiktaş | | 15.500 |
| (Portuguese Football Federation) Torreense | | 14.633 |
| (Israel Football Association) Hapoel Be'er Sheva | | 14.000 |
| (Royal Dutch Football Association) NEC | | 13.585 |
| (Hellenic Football Federation) OFI | | 9.682 |
| (Norwegian Football Federation) Lillestrøm | | 8.247 |
| (Bulgarian Football Union) Levski Sofia | | 7.000 |
| (Football Federation of Armenia) Ararat-Armenia | | 7.000 |

Notes

1. ^{ECL} Conference League title holders
2. ^{EL-PO} Winners of play-off round
3. ^{CL-CH} Losers of Champions League play-off round (Champions Path)
4. ^{CL-LP} Losers of Champions League play-off round (League Path)
5. ^{CL-L3} Losers of Champions League third qualifying round (League Path)

== Draw ==
The draw for the league phase pairings was held at the Grimaldi Forum in Monaco on 28 August 2026, 13:00 CEST, along with the draw for the Conference League league phase. The automated draw software instantly conducted the full digital draw at random, determining the home and away matches for all clubs. Each team faced two opponents from each of the four pots, one of which they faced at home and one away. Teams could not face opponents from their own association, and could only be drawn against a maximum of two sides from the same association. In addition, any individual fixture between two teams that had already been drawn in the last two seasons, could not be repeated for the third time with the same home team. The draw results were then be revealed pot-by-pot, starting with Pot 1, with the intention of "maintaining suspense and clarity for viewers".

League phase opponents by club
| Club | Pot 1 opponents | | Pot 2 opponents | | Pot 3 opponents | | Pot 4 opponents | | Avg coeff. |
| Club | Home | Away | Home | Away | Home | Away | Home | Away | Avg coeff. |
|---|---|---|---|---|---|---|---|---|---|
| (Germany) Bayer Leverkusen | Marseille | Lyon | Red Bull Salzburg | Dinamo Zagreb | Celje | Lech Poznań | Beşiktaş | OFI | 35.8 |
| (Portugal) Benfica | AZ | Milan | Celtic | Viktoria Plzeň | Lech Poznań | Omonia | OFI | NEC | 36.9 |
| (Italy) Juventus | Real Sociedad | AZ | Rennes | Ferencváros | Omonia | Celta Vigo | NEC | Hapoel Be'er Sheva | 34.3 |
| (Italy) Milan | Benfica | Olympiacos | Ferencváros | Red Bull Salzburg | Sunderland | Bournemouth | Ararat-Armenia | Levski Sofia | 38.8 |
| (France) Lyon | Bayer Leverkusen | Real Sociedad | Union Saint-Gilloise | Anderlecht | Crystal Palace | Jagiellonia Białystok | Lillestrøm | TSG Hoffenheim | 39.2 |
| (Netherlands) AZ | Juventus | Benfica | Dinamo Zagreb | Sparta Prague | Sturm Graz | Sunderland | Hapoel Be'er Sheva | Ararat-Armenia | 40.0 |
| (Greece) Olympiacos | Milan | Marseille | Sparta Prague | Rennes | Jagiellonia Białystok | Celje | TSG Hoffenheim | Torreense | 33.9 |
| (Spain) Real Sociedad | Lyon | Juventus | Viktoria Plzeň | Union Saint-Gilloise | Bournemouth | Crystal Palace | Torreense | Lillestrøm | 38.4 |
| (France) Marseille | Olympiacos | Bayer Leverkusen | Anderlecht | Celtic | Celta Vigo | Sturm Graz | Levski Sofia | Beşiktaş | 39.0 |
| (Hungary) Ferencváros | Juventus | Milan | Viktoria Plzeň | Celtic | Celje | Lech Poznań | Torreense | TSG Hoffenheim | 39.5 |
| (Czech Republic) Viktoria Plzeň | Benfica | Real Sociedad | Union Saint-Gilloise | Ferencváros | Jagiellonia Białystok | Bournemouth | Levski Sofia | Lillestrøm | 38.4 |
| (Belgium) Union Saint-Gilloise | Real Sociedad | Lyon | Celtic | Viktoria Plzeň | Lech Poznań | Celta Vigo | Hapoel Be'er Sheva | Beşiktaş | 36.7 |
| (Croatia) Dinamo Zagreb | Bayer Leverkusen | AZ | Anderlecht | Rennes | Sturm Graz | Sunderland | NEC | Hapoel Be'er Sheva | 39.1 |
| (Austria) Red Bull Salzburg | Milan | Bayer Leverkusen | Sparta Prague | Anderlecht | Crystal Palace | Celje | Ararat-Armenia | Levski Sofia | 37.6 |
| (Scotland) Celtic | Marseille | Benfica | Ferencváros | Union Saint-Gilloise | Celta Vigo | Omonia | Beşiktaş | Torreense | 39.3 |
| (Czech Republic) Sparta Prague | AZ | Olympiacos | Rennes | Red Bull Salzburg | Bournemouth | Crystal Palace | Lillestrøm | Ararat-Armenia | 33.5 |
| (France) Rennes | Olympiacos | Juventus | Dinamo Zagreb | Sparta Prague | Omonia | Sturm Graz | OFI | NEC | 36.5 |
| (Belgium) Anderlecht | Lyon | Marseille | Red Bull Salzburg | Dinamo Zagreb | Sunderland | Jagiellonia Białystok | TSG Hoffenheim | OFI | 35.7 |
| (Austria) Sturm Graz | Marseille | AZ | Rennes | Dinamo Zagreb | Celje | Bournemouth | OFI | TSG Hoffenheim | 34.2 |
| (Poland) Lech Poznań | Bayer Leverkusen | Benfica | Ferencváros | Union Saint-Gilloise | Sunderland | Crystal Palace | Torreense | OFI | 45.8 |
| (England) Crystal Palace | Real Sociedad | Lyon | Sparta Prague | Red Bull Salzburg | Lech Poznań | Jagiellonia Białystok | TSG Hoffenheim | Beşiktaş | 36.2 |
| (England) Bournemouth | Milan | Real Sociedad | Viktoria Plzeň | Sparta Prague | Sturm Graz | Celta Vigo | Hapoel Be'er Sheva | Lillestrøm | 35.2 |
| (England) Sunderland | AZ | Milan | Dinamo Zagreb | Anderlecht | Jagiellonia Białystok | Lech Poznań | Levski Sofia | Torreense | 34.6 |
| (Slovenia) Celje | Olympiacos | Bayer Leverkusen | Red Bull Salzburg | Ferencváros | Omonia | Sturm Graz | NEC | Ararat-Armenia | 41.7 |
| (Poland) Jagiellonia Białystok | Lyon | Olympiacos | Anderlecht | Viktoria Plzeň | Crystal Palace | Sunderland | Ararat-Armenia | Levski Sofia | 33.9 |
| (Cyprus) Omonia | Benfica | Juventus | Celtic | Rennes | Celta Vigo | Celje | Beşiktaş | NEC | 39.1 |
| (Spain) Celta Vigo | Juventus | Marseille | Union Saint-Gilloise | Celtic | Bournemouth | Omonia | Lillestrøm | Hapoel Be'er Sheva | 35.7 |
| (Germany) TSG Hoffenheim | Lyon | Olympiacos | Ferencváros | Anderlecht | Sturm Graz | Crystal Palace | Beşiktaş | OFI | 35.9 |
| (Turkey) Beşiktaş | Marseille | Bayer Leverkusen | Union Saint-Gilloise | Celtic | Crystal Palace | Omonia | Hapoel Be'er Sheva | TSG Hoffenheim | 41.1 |
| (Portugal) Torreense | Olympiacos | Real Sociedad | Celtic | Ferencváros | Sunderland | Lech Poznań | Ararat-Armenia | Lillestrøm | 35.1 |
| (Israel) Hapoel Be'er Sheva | Juventus | AZ | Dinamo Zagreb | Union Saint-Gilloise | Celta Vigo | Bournemouth | OFI | Beşiktaş | 37.3 |
| (Netherlands) NEC | Benfica | Juventus | Rennes | Dinamo Zagreb | Omonia | Celje | Levski Sofia | Ararat-Armenia | 37.8 |
| (Greece) OFI | Bayer Leverkusen | Benfica | Anderlecht | Rennes | Lech Poznań | Sturm Graz | TSG Hoffenheim | Hapoel Be'er Sheva | 43.6 |
| (Norway) Lillestrøm | Real Sociedad | Lyon | Viktoria Plzeň | Sparta Prague | Bournemouth | Celta Vigo | Torreense | Levski Sofia | 34.6 |
| (Bulgaria) Levski Sofia | Milan | Marseille | Red Bull Salzburg | Viktoria Plzeň | Jagiellonia Białystok | Sunderland | Lillestrøm | NEC | 35.4 |
| Ararat-Armenia | AZ | Milan | Sparta Prague | Red Bull Salzburg | Celje | Jagiellonia Białystok | NEC | Torreense | 35.7 |

== League phase table ==
The top eight ranked teams receive a bye directly to the round of 16. Teams ranked from 9th to 24th contest the knockout phase play-offs, with teams ranked from 9th to 16th seeded for the draw, while those ranked from 17th to 24th are not. Teams ranked from 25th to 36th are eliminated from all competitions.

| Pos | Team | Pld | W | D | L | GF | GA | GD | Pts | Qualification |
|---|---|---|---|---|---|---|---|---|---|---|
| 1 | (Portugal) Benfica | 4 | 4 | 0 | 0 | 13 | 3 | +10 | 12 | Advance to round of 16 (seeded) |
| 2 | (England) Bournemouth | 4 | 4 | 0 | 0 | 11 | 2 | +9 | 12 | Advance to round of 16 (seeded) |
| 3 | (Hungary) Ferencváros | 4 | 4 | 0 | 0 | 11 | 3 | +8 | 12 | Advance to round of 16 (seeded) |
| 4 | (Belgium) Union Saint-Gilloise | 4 | 3 | 1 | 0 | 10 | 2 | +8 | 10 | Advance to round of 16 (seeded) |
| 5 | (Italy) Juventus | 4 | 3 | 1 | 0 | 11 | 4 | +7 | 10 | Advance to round of 16 (seeded) |
| 6 | (Greece) Olympiacos | 4 | 3 | 1 | 0 | 4 | 1 | +3 | 10 | Advance to round of 16 (seeded) |
| 7 | (Germany) Bayer Leverkusen | 4 | 3 | 0 | 1 | 8 | 1 | +7 | 9 | Advance to round of 16 (seeded) |
| 8 | (Turkey) Beşiktaş | 4 | 2 | 1 | 1 | 11 | 8 | +3 | 7 | Advance to round of 16 (seeded) |
| 9 | (Croatia) Dinamo Zagreb | 4 | 2 | 1 | 1 | 5 | 4 | +1 | 7 | Advance to knockout phase play-offs (seeded) |
| 10 | (Bulgaria) Levski Sofia | 4 | 2 | 1 | 1 | 4 | 3 | +1 | 7 | Advance to knockout phase play-offs (seeded) |
| 11 | (England) Sunderland | 4 | 2 | 1 | 1 | 4 | 4 | 0 | 7 | Advance to knockout phase play-offs (seeded) |
| 12 | (Netherlands) NEC | 4 | 2 | 1 | 1 | 8 | 9 | −1 | 7 | Advance to knockout phase play-offs (seeded) |
| 13 | (France) Lyon | 4 | 2 | 1 | 1 | 6 | 7 | −1 | 7 | Advance to knockout phase play-offs (seeded) |
| 14 | (Netherlands) AZ | 4 | 2 | 0 | 2 | 7 | 4 | +3 | 6 | Advance to knockout phase play-offs (seeded) |
| 15 | (Belgium) Anderlecht | 4 | 2 | 0 | 2 | 6 | 3 | +3 | 6 | Advance to knockout phase play-offs (seeded) |
| 16 | (Greece) OFI | 4 | 2 | 0 | 2 | 5 | 4 | +1 | 6 | Advance to knockout phase play-offs (seeded) |
| 17 | (France) Rennes | 4 | 1 | 3 | 0 | 4 | 3 | +1 | 6 | Advance to knockout phase play-offs (unseeded) |
| 18 | (Cyprus) Omonia | 4 | 2 | 0 | 2 | 6 | 7 | −1 | 6 | Advance to knockout phase play-offs (unseeded) |
| 19 | (Portugal) Torreense | 4 | 2 | 0 | 2 | 7 | 9 | −2 | 6 | Advance to knockout phase play-offs (unseeded) |
| 20 | (Spain) Real Sociedad | 4 | 1 | 2 | 1 | 9 | 4 | +5 | 5 | Advance to knockout phase play-offs (unseeded) |
| 21 | (England) Crystal Palace | 4 | 1 | 2 | 1 | 9 | 6 | +3 | 5 | Advance to knockout phase play-offs (unseeded) |
| 22 | (Czech Republic) Sparta Prague | 4 | 1 | 1 | 2 | 6 | 6 | 0 | 4 | Advance to knockout phase play-offs (unseeded) |
| 23 | (Germany) TSG Hoffenheim | 4 | 1 | 1 | 2 | 6 | 6 | 0 | 4 | Advance to knockout phase play-offs (unseeded) |
| 24 | (Austria) Sturm Graz | 4 | 1 | 1 | 2 | 3 | 6 | −3 | 4 | Advance to knockout phase play-offs (unseeded) |
| 25 | (Slovenia) Celje | 4 | 1 | 1 | 2 | 5 | 9 | −4 | 4 | |
| 26 | (Austria) Red Bull Salzburg | 4 | 1 | 1 | 2 | 3 | 8 | −5 | 4 | |
| 27 | (Spain) Celta Vigo | 4 | 1 | 0 | 3 | 4 | 6 | −2 | 3 | |
| 28 | (Italy) Milan | 4 | 1 | 0 | 3 | 4 | 7 | −3 | 3 | |
| 29 | (Poland) Jagiellonia Białystok | 4 | 1 | 0 | 3 | 4 | 7 | −3 | 3 | |
| 30 | (Czech Republic) Viktoria Plzeň | 4 | 1 | 0 | 3 | 3 | 7 | −4 | 3 | |
| 31 | (France) Marseille | 4 | 1 | 0 | 3 | 2 | 6 | −4 | 3 | |
| 32 | (Scotland) Celtic | 4 | 1 | 0 | 3 | 6 | 11 | −5 | 3 | |
| 33 | (Israel) Hapoel Be'er Sheva | 4 | 0 | 1 | 3 | 1 | 8 | −7 | 1 | |
| 34 | (Norway) Lillestrøm | 4 | 0 | 1 | 3 | 2 | 10 | −8 | 1 | |
| 35 | (Poland) Lech Poznań | 4 | 0 | 1 | 3 | 2 | 12 | −10 | 1 | |
| 36 | Ararat-Armenia | 4 | 0 | 0 | 4 | 4 | 14 | −10 | 0 | |

Updated to match(es) played on 5 November 2026. Source: UEFA
Rules for classification: League phase tiebreakers

== Results summary ==
=== By matchday ===
Matchday 1
| Home team | Score | Away team |
|---|---|---|
| Ararat-Armenia | 1–4 | (Czech Republic) Sparta Prague |
| Omonia (Cyprus) | 1–0 | (Spain) Celta Vigo |
| Milan (Italy) | 0–2 | (Portugal) Benfica |
| Bayer Leverkusen (Germany) | 2–0 | (Slovenia) Celje |
| Hapoel Be'er Sheva (Israel) | 0–0 | (Croatia) Dinamo Zagreb |
| Olympiacos (Greece) | 2–1 | (Poland) Jagiellonia Białystok |
| Anderlecht (Belgium) | 1–2 | (France) Lyon |
| Sturm Graz (Austria) | 0–0 | (France) Rennes |
| Sunderland (England) | 1–0 | (Netherlands) AZ |
| OFI (Greece) | 2–0 | (Germany) TSG Hoffenheim |
| Levski Sofia (Bulgaria) | 0–1 | (Austria) Red Bull Salzburg |
| Beşiktaş (Turkey) | 4–1 | (France) Marseille |
| Celtic (Scotland) | 1–3 | (Hungary) Ferencváros |
| Crystal Palace (England) | 4–0 | (Poland) Lech Poznań |
| Viktoria Plzeň (Czech Republic) | 0–3 | (Belgium) Union Saint-Gilloise |
| Juventus (Italy) | 5–0 | (Netherlands) NEC |
| Lillestrøm (Norway) | 1–2 | (Portugal) Torreense |
| Real Sociedad (Spain) | 1–2 | (England) Bournemouth |

Matchday 2
| Home team | Score | Away team |
|---|---|---|
| Sparta Prague (Czech Republic) | 1–1 | (Norway) Lillestrøm |
| AZ (Netherlands) | 2–1 | (Israel) Hapoel Be'er Sheva |
| Red Bull Salzburg (Austria) | 0–4 | (Italy) Milan |
| Lech Poznań (Poland) | 0–4 | (Germany) Bayer Leverkusen |
| Celje (Slovenia) | 0–3 | (Cyprus) Omonia |
| Lyon (France) | 3–2 | (England) Crystal Palace |
| Union Saint-Gilloise (Belgium) | 1–1 | (Spain) Real Sociedad |
| Torreense (Portugal) | 1–2 | (England) Sunderland |
| Bournemouth (England) | 3–0 | (Austria) Sturm Graz |
| Ferencváros (Hungary) | 2–1 | (Czech Republic) Viktoria Plzeň |
| Dinamo Zagreb (Croatia) | 1–0 | (Belgium) Anderlecht |
| Jagiellonia Białystok (Poland) | 3–1 | Ararat-Armenia |
| NEC (Netherlands) | 1–1 | (Bulgaria) Levski Sofia |
| Marseille (France) | 0–1 | (Greece) Olympiacos |
| Celta Vigo (Spain) | 1–2 | (Italy) Juventus |
| Benfica (Portugal) | 4–1 | (Scotland) Celtic |
| Rennes (France) | 2–1 | (Greece) OFI |
| TSG Hoffenheim (Germany) | 2–3 | (Turkey) Beşiktaş |

Matchday 3
| Home team | Score | Away team |
|---|---|---|
| Ararat-Armenia | 0–4 | (Netherlands) AZ |
| Ferencváros (Hungary) | 4–1 | (Portugal) Torreense |
| Dinamo Zagreb (Croatia) | 2–4 | (Netherlands) NEC |
| Juventus (Italy) | 2–2 | (France) Rennes |
| Lech Poznań (Poland) | 1–1 | (England) Sunderland |
| OFI (Greece) | 0–2 | (Germany) Bayer Leverkusen |
| Union Saint-Gilloise (Belgium) | 4–0 | (Israel) Hapoel Be'er Sheva |
| Sturm Graz (Austria) | 1–0 | (France) Marseille |
| Bournemouth (England) | 3–0 | (Italy) Milan |
| Beşiktaş (Turkey) | 2–2 | (England) Crystal Palace |
| Celtic (Scotland) | 1–2 | (Spain) Celta Vigo |
| Viktoria Plzeň (Czech Republic) | 1–2 | (Bulgaria) Levski Sofia |
| Jagiellonia Białystok (Poland) | 0–3 | (Belgium) Anderlecht |
| Lillestrøm (Norway) | 0–6 | (Spain) Real Sociedad |
| Celje (Slovenia) | 2–2 | (Austria) Red Bull Salzburg |
| Olympiacos (Greece) | 1–0 | (Czech Republic) Sparta Prague |
| Omonia (Cyprus) | 1–4 | (Portugal) Benfica |
| TSG Hoffenheim (Germany) | 3–0 | (France) Lyon |

Matchday 4
| Home team | Score | Away team |
|---|---|---|
| Rennes (France) | 0–0 | (Greece) Olympiacos |
| Milan (Italy) | 0–2 | (Hungary) Ferencváros |
| Sparta Prague (Czech Republic) | 1–3 | (England) Bournemouth |
| Crystal Palace (England) | 1–1 | (Germany) TSG Hoffenheim |
| Lillestrøm (Norway) | 0–1 | (Czech Republic) Viktoria Plzeň |
| NEC (Netherlands) | 3–1 | (Cyprus) Omonia |
| Levski Sofia (Bulgaria) | 1–0 | (Poland) Jagiellonia Białystok |
| Real Sociedad (Spain) | 1–1 | (France) Lyon |
| Anderlecht (Belgium) | 2–0 | (Austria) Red Bull Salzburg |
| AZ (Netherlands) | 1–2 | (Italy) Juventus |
| Bayer Leverkusen (Germany) | 0–1 | (France) Marseille |
| Celtic (Scotland) | 3–2 | (Turkey) Beşiktaş |
| Hapoel Be'er Sheva (Israel) | 0–2 | (Greece) OFI |
| Celta Vigo (Spain) | 1–2 | (Belgium) Union Saint-Gilloise |
| Torreense (Portugal) | 3–2 | Ararat-Armenia |
| Sturm Graz (Austria) | 2–3 | (Slovenia) Celje |
| Benfica (Portugal) | 3–1 | (Poland) Lech Poznań |
| Sunderland (England) | 0–2 | (Croatia) Dinamo Zagreb |

Matchday 5
| Home team | Score | Away team |
|---|---|---|
| Beşiktaş (Turkey) | 26 Nov | (Israel) Hapoel Be'er Sheva |
| Red Bull Salzburg (Austria) | 26 Nov | Ararat-Armenia |
| Viktoria Plzeň (Czech Republic) | 26 Nov | (Portugal) Benfica |
| Dinamo Zagreb (Croatia) | 26 Nov | (Germany) Bayer Leverkusen |
| Olympiacos (Greece) | 26 Nov | (Italy) Milan |
| Marseille (France) | 26 Nov | (Bulgaria) Levski Sofia |
| Union Saint-Gilloise (Belgium) | 26 Nov | (Poland) Lech Poznań |
| Celta Vigo (Spain) | 26 Nov | (England) Bournemouth |
| Sparta Prague (Czech Republic) | 26 Nov | (Netherlands) AZ |
| Crystal Palace (England) | 26 Nov | (Spain) Real Sociedad |
| Ferencváros (Hungary) | 26 Nov | (Slovenia) Celje |
| Juventus (Italy) | 26 Nov | (Cyprus) Omonia |
| NEC (Netherlands) | 26 Nov | (France) Rennes |
| OFI (Greece) | 26 Nov | (Belgium) Anderlecht |
| Lyon (France) | 26 Nov | (Norway) Lillestrøm |
| Torreense (Portugal) | 26 Nov | (Scotland) Celtic |
| Sunderland (England) | 26 Nov | (Poland) Jagiellonia Białystok |
| TSG Hoffenheim (Germany) | 26 Nov | (Austria) Sturm Graz |

Matchday 6
| Home team | Score | Away team |
|---|---|---|
| AZ (Netherlands) | 10 Dec | (Austria) Sturm Graz |
| Ararat-Armenia | 10 Dec | (Netherlands) NEC |
| Hapoel Be'er Sheva (Israel) | 10 Dec | (Italy) Juventus |
| Jagiellonia Białystok (Poland) | 10 Dec | (England) Crystal Palace |
| Marseille (France) | 10 Dec | (Spain) Celta Vigo |
| Omonia (Cyprus) | 10 Dec | (Scotland) Celtic |
| Anderlecht (Belgium) | 10 Dec | (Germany) TSG Hoffenheim |
| Rennes (France) | 10 Dec | (Croatia) Dinamo Zagreb |
| Milan (Italy) | 10 Dec | (England) Sunderland |
| Bournemouth (England) | 10 Dec | (Czech Republic) Viktoria Plzeň |
| Bayer Leverkusen (Germany) | 10 Dec | (Turkey) Beşiktaş |
| Red Bull Salzburg (Austria) | 10 Dec | (Czech Republic) Sparta Prague |
| Lech Poznań (Poland) | 10 Dec | (Hungary) Ferencváros |
| Celje (Slovenia) | 10 Dec | (Greece) Olympiacos |
| Lyon (France) | 10 Dec | (Belgium) Union Saint-Gilloise |
| Levski Sofia (Bulgaria) | 10 Dec | (Norway) Lillestrøm |
| Real Sociedad (Spain) | 10 Dec | (Portugal) Torreense |
| Benfica (Portugal) | 10 Dec | (Greece) OFI |

Matchday 7
| Home team | Score | Away team |
|---|---|---|
| Beşiktaş (Turkey) | 21 Jan | (Belgium) Union Saint-Gilloise |
| Ararat-Armenia | 21 Jan | (Slovenia) Celje |
| Ferencváros (Hungary) | 21 Jan | (Italy) Juventus |
| Jagiellonia Białystok (Poland) | 21 Jan | (France) Lyon |
| Lillestrøm (Norway) | 21 Jan | (England) Bournemouth |
| NEC (Netherlands) | 21 Jan | (Portugal) Benfica |
| Olympiacos (Greece) | 21 Jan | (Germany) TSG Hoffenheim |
| Real Sociedad (Spain) | 21 Jan | (Czech Republic) Viktoria Plzeň |
| Sturm Graz (Austria) | 21 Jan | (Greece) OFI |
| AZ (Netherlands) | 21 Jan | (Croatia) Dinamo Zagreb |
| Bayer Leverkusen (Germany) | 21 Jan | (Austria) Red Bull Salzburg |
| Celtic (Scotland) | 21 Jan | (France) Marseille |
| Crystal Palace (England) | 21 Jan | (Czech Republic) Sparta Prague |
| Hapoel Be'er Sheva (Israel) | 21 Jan | (Spain) Celta Vigo |
| Lech Poznań (Poland) | 21 Jan | (Portugal) Torreense |
| Levski Sofia (Bulgaria) | 21 Jan | (Italy) Milan |
| Anderlecht (Belgium) | 21 Jan | (England) Sunderland |
| Rennes (France) | 21 Jan | (Cyprus) Omonia |

Matchday 8
| Home team | Score | Away team |
|---|---|---|
| Milan (Italy) | 28 Jan | Ararat-Armenia |
| Sparta Prague (Czech Republic) | 28 Jan | (France) Rennes |
| Bournemouth (England) | 28 Jan | (Israel) Hapoel Be'er Sheva |
| Red Bull Salzburg (Austria) | 28 Jan | (England) Crystal Palace |
| Viktoria Plzeň (Czech Republic) | 28 Jan | (Poland) Jagiellonia Białystok |
| Dinamo Zagreb (Croatia) | 28 Jan | (Austria) Sturm Graz |
| Juventus (Italy) | 28 Jan | (Spain) Real Sociedad |
| Celje (Slovenia) | 28 Jan | (Netherlands) NEC |
| OFI (Greece) | 28 Jan | (Poland) Lech Poznań |
| Marseille (France) | 28 Jan | (Belgium) Anderlecht |
| Lyon (France) | 28 Jan | (Germany) Bayer Leverkusen |
| Omonia (Cyprus) | 28 Jan | (Turkey) Beşiktaş |
| Union Saint-Gilloise (Belgium) | 28 Jan | (Scotland) Celtic |
| Celta Vigo (Spain) | 28 Jan | (Norway) Lillestrøm |
| Torreense (Portugal) | 28 Jan | (Greece) Olympiacos |
| Benfica (Portugal) | 28 Jan | (Netherlands) AZ |
| Sunderland (England) | 28 Jan | (Bulgaria) Levski Sofia |
| TSG Hoffenheim (Germany) | 28 Jan | (Hungary) Ferencváros |

=== By team ===
Results by Pot 1 team
| Team | Matchday | | | | | | | |
| Team | 1 | 2 | 3 | 4 | 5 | 6 | 7 | 8 |
|---|---|---|---|---|---|---|---|---|
| (Germany) Bayer Leverkusen | CEJ (H) | LPO (A) | OFI (A) | MAR (H) | DIN (A) | BES (H) | SAL (H) | LYO (A) |
| (Germany) Bayer Leverkusen | 2–0 | 4–0 | 2–0 | 0–1 | 26 Nov | 10 Dec | 21 Jan | 28 Jan |
| (Portugal) Benfica | MIL (A) | CLT (H) | OMO (A) | LPO (H) | PLZ (A) | OFI (H) | NEC (A) | AZ (H) |
| (Portugal) Benfica | 2–0 | 4–1 | 4–1 | 3–1 | 26 Nov | 10 Dec | 21 Jan | 28 Jan |
| (Italy) Juventus | NEC (H) | CEL (A) | REN (H) | AZ (A) | OMO (H) | HBS (A) | FER (A) | RSO (H) |
| (Italy) Juventus | 5–0 | 2–1 | 2–2 | 2–1 | 26 Nov | 10 Dec | 21 Jan | 28 Jan |
| (Italy) Milan | BEN (H) | SAL (A) | BOU (A) | FER (H) | OLY (A) | SUN (H) | LSO (A) | AAR (H) |
| (Italy) Milan | 0–2 | 4–0 | 0–3 | 0–2 | 26 Nov | 10 Dec | 21 Jan | 28 Jan |
| (France) Lyon | AND (A) | CRY (H) | HOF (A) | RSO (A) | LIL (H) | USG (H) | JAG (A) | LEV (H) |
| (France) Lyon | 2–1 | 3–2 | 0–3 | 1–1 | 26 Nov | 10 Dec | 21 Jan | 28 Jan |
| (Netherlands) AZ | SUN (A) | HBS (H) | AAR (A) | JUV (H) | SPA (A) | STU (H) | DIN (H) | BEN (A) |
| (Netherlands) AZ | 0–1 | 2–1 | 4–0 | 1–2 | 26 Nov | 10 Dec | 21 Jan | 28 Jan |
| (Greece) Olympiacos | JAG (H) | MAR (A) | SPA (H) | REN (A) | MIL (H) | CEJ (A) | HOF (H) | TOR (A) |
| (Greece) Olympiacos | 2–1 | 1–0 | 1–0 | 0–0 | 26 Nov | 10 Dec | 21 Jan | 28 Jan |
| (Spain) Real Sociedad | BOU (H) | USG (A) | LIL (A) | LYO (H) | CRY (A) | TOR (H) | PLZ (H) | JUV (A) |
| (Spain) Real Sociedad | 1–2 | 1–1 | 6–0 | 1–1 | 26 Nov | 10 Dec | 21 Jan | 28 Jan |
| (France) Marseille | BES (A) | OLY (H) | STU (A) | LEV (A) | LSO (H) | CEL (H) | CLT (A) | AND (H) |
| (France) Marseille | 1–4 | 0–1 | 0–1 | 1–0 | 26 Nov | 10 Dec | 21 Jan | 28 Jan |

Results by Pot 2 team
| Team | Matchday | | | | | | | |
| Team | 1 | 2 | 3 | 4 | 5 | 6 | 7 | 8 |
|---|---|---|---|---|---|---|---|---|
| (Hungary) Ferencváros | CLT (A) | PLZ (H) | TOR (H) | MIL (A) | CEJ (H) | LPO (A) | JUV (H) | HOF (A) |
| (Hungary) Ferencváros | 3–1 | 2–1 | 4–1 | 2–0 | 26 Nov | 10 Dec | 21 Jan | 28 Jan |
| (Czech Republic) Viktoria Plzeň | USG (H) | FER (A) | LSO (H) | LIL (A) | BEN (H) | BOU (A) | RSO (A) | JAG (H) |
| (Czech Republic) Viktoria Plzeň | 0–3 | 1–2 | 1–2 | 1–0 | 26 Nov | 10 Dec | 21 Jan | 28 Jan |
| (Belgium) Union Saint-Gilloise | PLZ (A) | RSO (H) | HBS (H) | CEL (A) | LPO (H) | LYO (A) | BES (A) | CLT (H) |
| (Belgium) Union Saint-Gilloise | 3–0 | 1–1 | 4–0 | 2–1 | 26 Nov | 10 Dec | 21 Jan | 28 Jan |
| (Croatia) Dinamo Zagreb | HBS (A) | AND (H) | NEC (H) | SUN (A) | LEV (H) | REN (A) | AZ (A) | STU (H) |
| (Croatia) Dinamo Zagreb | 0–0 | 1–0 | 2–4 | 2–0 | 26 Nov | 10 Dec | 21 Jan | 28 Jan |
| (Austria) Red Bull Salzburg | LSO (A) | MIL (H) | CEJ (A) | AND (A) | AAR (H) | SPA (H) | LEV (A) | CRY (H) |
| (Austria) Red Bull Salzburg | 1–0 | 0–4 | 2–2 | 0–2 | 26 Nov | 10 Dec | 21 Jan | 28 Jan |
| (Scotland) Celtic | FER (H) | BEN (A) | CEL (H) | BES (H) | TOR (A) | OMO (A) | MAR (H) | USG (A) |
| (Scotland) Celtic | 1–3 | 1–4 | 1–2 | 3–2 | 26 Nov | 10 Dec | 21 Jan | 28 Jan |
| (Czech Republic) Sparta Prague | AAR (A) | LIL (H) | OLY (A) | BOU (H) | AZ (H) | SAL (A) | CRY (A) | REN (H) |
| (Czech Republic) Sparta Prague | 4–1 | 1–1 | 0–1 | 1–3 | 26 Nov | 10 Dec | 21 Jan | 28 Jan |
| (France) Rennes | STU (A) | OFI (H) | JUV (A) | OLY (H) | NEC (A) | DIN (H) | OMO (H) | SPA (A) |
| (France) Rennes | 0–0 | 2–1 | 2–2 | 0–0 | 26 Nov | 10 Dec | 21 Jan | 28 Jan |
| (Belgium) Anderlecht | LYO (H) | DIN (A) | JAG (A) | SAL (H) | OFI (A) | HOF (H) | SUN (H) | MAR (A) |
| (Belgium) Anderlecht | 1–2 | 0–1 | 3–0 | 2–0 | 26 Nov | 10 Dec | 21 Jan | 28 Jan |

Results by Pot 3 team
| Team | Matchday | | | | | | | |
| Team | 1 | 2 | 3 | 4 | 5 | 6 | 7 | 8 |
|---|---|---|---|---|---|---|---|---|
| (Austria) Sturm Graz | REN (H) | BOU (A) | MAR (H) | CEJ (H) | HOF (A) | AZ (A) | OFI (H) | DIN (A) |
| (Austria) Sturm Graz | 0–0 | 0–3 | 1–0 | 2–3 | 26 Nov | 10 Dec | 21 Jan | 28 Jan |
| (Poland) Lech Poznań | CRY (A) | LEV (H) | SUN (H) | BEN (A) | USG (A) | FER (H) | TOR (H) | OFI (A) |
| (Poland) Lech Poznań | 0–4 | 0–4 | 1–1 | 1–3 | 26 Nov | 10 Dec | 21 Jan | 28 Jan |
| (England) Crystal Palace | LPO (H) | LYO (A) | BES (A) | HOF (H) | RSO (H) | JAG (A) | SPA (H) | SAL (A) |
| (England) Crystal Palace | 4–0 | 2–3 | 2–2 | 1–1 | 26 Nov | 10 Dec | 21 Jan | 28 Jan |
| (England) Bournemouth | RSO (A) | STU (H) | MIL (H) | SPA (A) | CEL (A) | PLZ (H) | LIL (A) | HBS (H) |
| (England) Bournemouth | 2–1 | 3–0 | 3–0 | 3–1 | 26 Nov | 10 Dec | 21 Jan | 28 Jan |
| (England) Sunderland | AZ (H) | TOR (A) | LPO (A) | DIN (H) | JAG (H) | MIL (A) | AND (A) | LSO (H) |
| (England) Sunderland | 1–0 | 2–1 | 1–1 | 0–2 | 26 Nov | 10 Dec | 21 Jan | 28 Jan |
| (Slovenia) Celje | LEV (A) | OMO (H) | SAL (H) | STU (A) | FER (A) | OLY (H) | AAR (A) | NEC (H) |
| (Slovenia) Celje | 0–2 | 0–3 | 2–2 | 3–2 | 26 Nov | 10 Dec | 21 Jan | 28 Jan |
| (Poland) Jagiellonia Białystok | OLY (A) | AAR (H) | AND (H) | LSO (A) | SUN (A) | CRY (H) | LYO (H) | PLZ (A) |
| (Poland) Jagiellonia Białystok | 1–2 | 3–1 | 0–3 | 0–1 | 26 Nov | 10 Dec | 21 Jan | 28 Jan |
| (Cyprus) Omonia | CEL (H) | CEJ (A) | BEN (H) | NEC (A) | JUV (A) | CLT (H) | REN (A) | BES (H) |
| (Cyprus) Omonia | 1–0 | 3–0 | 1–4 | 1–3 | 26 Nov | 10 Dec | 21 Jan | 28 Jan |
| (Spain) Celta Vigo | OMO (A) | JUV (H) | CLT (A) | USG (H) | BOU (H) | MAR (A) | HBS (A) | LIL (H) |
| (Spain) Celta Vigo | 0–1 | 1–2 | 2–1 | 1–2 | 26 Nov | 10 Dec | 21 Jan | 28 Jan |

Results by Pot 4 team
| Team | Matchday | | | | | | | |
| Team | 1 | 2 | 3 | 4 | 5 | 6 | 7 | 8 |
|---|---|---|---|---|---|---|---|---|
| (Germany) TSG Hoffenheim | OFI (A) | BES (H) | LYO (H) | CRY (A) | STU (H) | AND (A) | OLY (A) | FER (H) |
| (Germany) TSG Hoffenheim | 0–2 | 2–3 | 3–0 | 1–1 | 26 Nov | 10 Dec | 21 Jan | 28 Jan |
| (Turkey) Beşiktaş | MAR (H) | HOF (A) | CRY (H) | CLT (A) | HBS (H) | LEV (A) | USG (H) | OMO (A) |
| (Turkey) Beşiktaş | 4–1 | 3–2 | 2–2 | 2–3 | 26 Nov | 10 Dec | 21 Jan | 28 Jan |
| (Portugal) Torreense | LIL (A) | SUN (H) | FER (A) | AAR (H) | CLT (H) | RSO (A) | LPO (A) | OLY (H) |
| (Portugal) Torreense | 2–1 | 1–2 | 1–4 | 3–2 | 26 Nov | 10 Dec | 21 Jan | 28 Jan |
| (Israel) Hapoel Be'er Sheva | DIN (H) | AZ (A) | USG (A) | OFI (H) | BES (A) | JUV (H) | CEL (H) | BOU (A) |
| (Israel) Hapoel Be'er Sheva | 0–0 | 1–2 | 0–4 | 0–2 | 26 Nov | 10 Dec | 21 Jan | 28 Jan |
| (Netherlands) NEC | JUV (A) | LSO (H) | DIN (A) | OMO (H) | REN (H) | AAR (A) | BEN (H) | CEJ (A) |
| (Netherlands) NEC | 0–5 | 1–1 | 4–2 | 3–1 | 26 Nov | 10 Dec | 21 Jan | 28 Jan |
| (Greece) OFI | HOF (H) | REN (A) | LEV (H) | HBS (A) | AND (H) | BEN (A) | STU (A) | LPO (H) |
| (Greece) OFI | 2–0 | 1–2 | 0–2 | 2–0 | 26 Nov | 10 Dec | 21 Jan | 28 Jan |
| (Norway) Lillestrøm | TOR (H) | SPA (A) | RSO (H) | PLZ (H) | LYO (A) | LSO (A) | BOU (H) | CEL (A) |
| (Norway) Lillestrøm | 1–2 | 1–1 | 0–6 | 0–1 | 26 Nov | 10 Dec | 21 Jan | 28 Jan |
| (Bulgaria) Levski Sofia | SAL (H) | NEC (A) | PLZ (A) | JAG (H) | MAR (A) | LIL (H) | MIL (H) | SUN (A) |
| (Bulgaria) Levski Sofia | 0–1 | 1–1 | 2–1 | 1–0 | 26 Nov | 10 Dec | 21 Jan | 28 Jan |
| Ararat-Armenia | SPA (H) | JAG (A) | AZ (H) | TOR (A) | SAL (A) | NEC (H) | CEJ (H) | MIL (A) |
| Ararat-Armenia | 1–4 | 1–3 | 0–4 | 2–3 | 26 Nov | 10 Dec | 21 Jan | 28 Jan |

Updated to match(es) played on 5 November 2026. Source: UEFA
Scores and legend colours are listed from the perspective of the team in the "Team" column.
Legend: H = home, A = away. Green = win; Yellow = draw; Red = loss.

== Matches ==
The fixture list was announced on 29 August 2026, the day after the draw.

Times are CET or CEST, (Note: CEST (UTC+2) for dates up to 24 October 2026 (matchdays 1–3), and CET (UTC+1) for dates thereafter (matchdays 4–8).) as listed by UEFA (local times, if different, are in parentheses).

=== Matchday 1 ===
16 September 2026
18:45 (20:45 UTC+4)

| Ararat-Armenia | 1–4 | (Czech Republic) Sparta Prague |
|---|---|---|
| Wilson 55' | Report | Guddal 20', 22'; Mercado 53'; Vydra 71' |

Vazgen Sargsyan Republican Stadium, Yerevan (Note: Ararat-Armenia will play their home matches at Vazgen Sargsyan Republican Stadium, Yerevan, instead of their regular stadium, Yerevan Football Academy Stadium, Yerevan, which does not meet UEFA requirements.)
Attendance: 11,400
Referee: Mohammed Al-Hakim (Sweden)

16 September 2026
18:45 (19:45 UTC+3)

| Omonia (Cyprus) | 1–0 | (Spain) Celta Vigo |
|---|---|---|
| Balkovec 88' | Report |

GSP Stadium, Nicosia
Attendance: 11,271
Referee: Balázs Berke (Hungary)

16 September 2026
21:00

| Milan (Italy) | 0–2 | (Portugal) Benfica |
|---|---|---|
| | Report | Lukébakio 16'; Kamiński 53' |

San Siro, Milan
Attendance: 68,393
Referee: Jarred Gillett (England)

16 September 2026
21:00

| Bayer Leverkusen (Germany) | 2–0 | (Slovenia) Celje |
|---|---|---|
| Sešlar 15' (o.g.); Medina 74' | Report |

BayArena, Leverkusen
Attendance: 27,945
Referee: Jasper Vergoote (Belgium)

16 September 2026
21:00 (22:00 UTC+3)

| Hapoel Be'er Sheva (Israel) | 0–0 | (Croatia) Dinamo Zagreb |
|---|---|---|
| | Report |

Rapid-Giulești Stadium, Bucharest, Romania (Note: Due to the Gaza war, Israeli teams are required to play their home matches at neutral venues until further notice. Therefore, Hapoel Be'er Sheva will play their home matches at Rapid-Giulești Stadium, Bucharest, Romania, instead of their regular stadium, Turner Stadium, Beersheba.)
Attendance: 1,102
Referee: John Brooks (England)

16 September 2026
21:00 (22:00 UTC+3)

| Olympiacos (Greece) | 2–1 | (Poland) Jagiellonia Białystok |
|---|---|---|
| González 43'; Yaremchuk 84' | Report | Szmyt 20' |

Karaiskakis Stadium, Piraeus
Attendance: 30,540
Referee: Harm Osmers (Germany)

16 September 2026
21:00

| Anderlecht (Belgium) | 1–2 | (France) Lyon |
|---|---|---|
| Cvetković 61' | Report | Nartey 8'; Nakamura 22' |

Constant Vanden Stock Stadium, Brussels
Attendance: 16,337
Referee: Ricardo de Burgos Bengoetxea (Spain)

16 September 2026
21:00

| Sturm Graz (Austria) | 0–0 | (France) Rennes |
|---|---|---|
| | Report |

Liebenauer Stadium, Graz
Attendance: 13,109
Referee: Manfredas Lukjančukas (Lithuania)

16 September 2026
21:00 (20:00 UTC+1)

| Sunderland (England) | 1–0 | (Netherlands) AZ |
|---|---|---|
| Le Fée 66' (pen.) | Report |

Stadium of Light, Sunderland
Attendance: 45,555
Referee: Jérémie Pignard (France)

17 September 2026
18:45 (19:45 UTC+3)

| OFI (Greece) | 2–0 | (Germany) TSG Hoffenheim |
|---|---|---|
| Cantalapiedra 30'; Kanellopoulos 84' | Report |

Pankritio Stadium, Heraklion
Attendance: 14,909
Referee: Javier Alberola Rojas (Spain)

17 September 2026
18:45 (19:45 UTC+3)

| Levski Sofia (Bulgaria) | 0–1 | (Austria) Red Bull Salzburg |
|---|---|---|
| | Report | Tabaković 39' |

Vasil Levski National Stadium, Sofia (Note: Levski Sofia will play their home matches at Vasil Levski National Stadium, Sofia, instead of their regular stadium, Stadion Georgi Asparuhov, Sofia, which does not meet UEFA requirements.)
Attendance: 22,378
Referee: Mohammad Al-Emara (Finland)

17 September 2026
21:00 (22:00 UTC+3)

| Beşiktaş (Turkey) | 4–1 | (France) Marseille |
|---|---|---|
| Fakılı 15'; Černý 56'; Murillo 59'; Poku 81' | Report | Abdallah 30' |

Beşiktaş Stadium, Istanbul
Attendance: 39,831
Referee: Andrea Colombo (Italy)

17 September 2026
21:00 (20:00 UTC+1)

| Celtic (Scotland) | 1–3 | (Hungary) Ferencváros |
|---|---|---|
| Baur 44' | Report | Scales 20' (o.g.); Zachariassen 45+1'; Arzani 47' |

Celtic Park, Glasgow
Attendance: 48,223
Referee: Patrik Kolarić (Croatia)

17 September 2026
21:00 (20:00 UTC+1)

| Crystal Palace (England) | 4–0 | (Poland) Lech Poznań |
|---|---|---|
| Pino 10'; Richards 27'; Larsen 34' (pen.); Nketiah 89' | Report |

Selhurst Park, London
Attendance: 18,117
Referee: Michal Očenáš (Slovakia)

17 September 2026
21:00

| Viktoria Plzeň (Czech Republic) | 0–3 | (Belgium) Union Saint-Gilloise |
|---|---|---|
| | Report | Mofokeng 18'; Biondic 43'; Kričfaluši 59' |

Doosan Arena, Plzeň
Attendance: 8,211
Referee: Yigal Frid (Israel)

17 September 2026
21:00

| Juventus (Italy) | 5–0 | (Netherlands) NEC |
|---|---|---|
| González 9'; Alajbegović 24'; Woltemade 35' (pen.); Çelik 75'; Kolo Muani 82' | Report |

Juventus Stadium, Turin
Attendance: 41,407
Referee: Oleksiy Derevinskyi (Ukraine)

17 September 2026
21:00

| Lillestrøm (Norway) | 1–2 | (Portugal) Torreense |
|---|---|---|
| Olsen 79' | Report | Alfaro 23'; Pozo 49' |

Åråsen Stadion, Lillestrøm
Attendance: 6,568
Referee: Ondřej Berka (Czech Republic)

17 September 2026
21:00

| Real Sociedad (Spain) | 1–2 | (England) Bournemouth |
|---|---|---|
| Gómez 57' | Report | Kluivert 11'; Rayan 20' |

Anoeta, San Sebastián
Attendance: 30,020
Referee: Paweł Raczkowski (Poland)

=== Matchday 2 ===
15 October 2026
18:45

| Sparta Prague (Czech Republic) | 1–1 | (Norway) Lillestrøm |
|---|---|---|
| Alcócer 56' | Report | Olsen 90+2' |

Stadion Letná, Prague
Attendance: 17,024
Referee: Martin Matoša (Slovenia)

15 October 2026
18:45

| AZ (Netherlands) | 2–1 | (Israel) Hapoel Be'er Sheva |
|---|---|---|
| Koopmeiners 49'; Meerdink 77' (pen.) | Report | Forson 55' |

AFAS Stadion, Alkmaar
Attendance: 14,342
Referee: Radoslav Gidzhenov (Bulgaria)

15 October 2026
18:45

| Red Bull Salzburg (Austria) | 0–4 | (Italy) Milan |
|---|---|---|
| | Report | Cisse 15', 32', 49'; Ramos 72' |

Red Bull Arena, Salzburg
Attendance: 22,503
Referee: Horațiu Feşnic (Romania)

15 October 2026
18:45

| Lech Poznań (Poland) | 0–4 | (Germany) Bayer Leverkusen |
|---|---|---|
| | Report | Schick 29' (pen.), 41' (pen.); Tillman 32'; Maza 89' |

Poznań Stadium, Poznań
Attendance: 40,116
Referee: Miloš Milanović (Serbia)

15 October 2026
18:45

| Celje (Slovenia) | 0–3 | (Cyprus) Omonia |
|---|---|---|
| | Report | Montnor 17'; Tanković 59'; Coulibaly 85' |

Stadion Z'dežele, Celje
Attendance: 4,260
Referee: Elchin Masiyev (Azerbaijan)

15 October 2026
18:45

| Lyon (France) | 3–2 | (England) Crystal Palace |
|---|---|---|
| Tolisso 8'; Nuamah 45+2'; Šulc 76' | Report | Pino 50'; Kamada 81' |

Parc Olympique Lyonnais, Décines-Charpieu
Attendance: 40,274
Referee: João Pinheiro (Portugal)

15 October 2026
18:45

| Union Saint-Gilloise (Belgium) | 1–1 | (Spain) Real Sociedad |
|---|---|---|
| Keita 88' | Report | Turrientes 46' |

Den Dreef, Leuven (Note: Union Saint-Gilloise will play their home matches at Den Dreef, Leuven, instead of their regular stadium, Joseph Marien Stadium, Brussels, which does not meet UEFA requirements.)
Attendance: 6,975
Referee: Goga Kikacheishvili (Georgia)

15 October 2026
18:45 (17:45 UTC+1)

| Torreense (Portugal) | 1–2 | (England) Sunderland |
|---|---|---|
| Feltes 37' | Report | Ahoka 67'; Sadiki 90+3' |

Estádio Dr. Magalhães Pessoa, Leiria (Note: Torreense will play their home matches at Estádio Dr. Magalhães Pessoa, Leiria, instead of their regular stadium, Estádio Manuel Marques, Torres Vedras, which does not meet UEFA requirements.)
Attendance: 6,321
Referee: Enea Jorgji (Albania)

15 October 2026
21:00 (20:00 UTC+1)

| Bournemouth (England) | 3–0 | (Austria) Sturm Graz |
|---|---|---|
| Evanilson 43'; Rayan 76'; Rodríguez 90+2' (pen.) | Report |

Dean Court, Bournemouth
Attendance: 12,070
Referee: Jérôme Brisard (France)

15 October 2026
21:00

| Ferencváros (Hungary) | 2–1 | (Czech Republic) Viktoria Plzeň |
|---|---|---|
| Zachariassen 49', 81' (pen.) | Report | Višinský 90' |

Ferencváros Stadion, Budapest
Attendance: 16,686
Referee: Damian Sylwestrzak (Poland)

15 October 2026
21:00

| Dinamo Zagreb (Croatia) | 1–0 | (Belgium) Anderlecht |
|---|---|---|
| Beljo 90+6' (pen.) | Report |

Maksimir Stadium, Zagreb
Attendance: 12,279
Referee: Orel Grinfeld (Israel)

15 October 2026
21:00

| Jagiellonia Białystok (Poland) | 3–1 | Ararat-Armenia |
|---|---|---|
| Jóźwiak 13'; Conceição 38'; Sow 51' | Report | Banjaqui 11' |

Stadion Miejski, Białystok
Attendance: 12,169
Referee: Anastasios Papapetrou (Greece)

15 October 2026
21:00

| NEC (Netherlands) | 1–1 | (Bulgaria) Levski Sofia |
|---|---|---|
| Chery 64' | Report | Reinaldo 35' |

Goffertstadion, Nijmegen
Attendance: 11,700
Referee: Aliyar Aghayev (Azerbaijan)

15 October 2026
21:00

| Marseille (France) | 0–1 | (Greece) Olympiacos |
|---|---|---|
| | Report | Hezze 42' |

Stade Vélodrome, Marseille
Attendance: 57,051
Referee: Michael Oliver (England)

15 October 2026
21:00

| Celta Vigo (Spain) | 1–2 | (Italy) Juventus |
|---|---|---|
| Álvarez 18' | Report | Woltemade 58'; Kolo Muani 90+2' |

Balaídos, Vigo
Attendance: 21,805
Referee: Sander van der Eijk (Netherlands)

15 October 2026
21:00 (20:00 UTC+1)

| Benfica (Portugal) | 4–1 | (Scotland) Celtic |
|---|---|---|
| J. Durán 5' (pen.), 36'; Bah 23'; Pavlidis 89' | Report | C. Durán 63' |

Estádio da Luz, Lisbon
Attendance: 58,870
Referee: Nikola Dabanović (Montenegro)

15 October 2026
21:00

| Rennes (France) | 2–1 | (Greece) OFI |
|---|---|---|
| Nagida 76'; Aït Boudlal 90' | Report | Fountas 10' |

Roazhon Park, Rennes
Attendance: 23,367
Referee: Andrea Colombo (Italy)

15 October 2026
21:00

| TSG Hoffenheim (Germany) | 2–3 | (Turkey) Beşiktaş |
|---|---|---|
| Asllani 68'; Machida 88' | Report | Murillo 60'; Oh Hyeon-gyu 72', 79' |

Rhein-Neckar-Arena, Sinsheim
Attendance: 26,632
Referee: Lawrence Visser (Belgium)

=== Matchday 3 ===
22 October 2026
18:45 (20:45 UTC+4)

| Ararat-Armenia | 0–4 | (Netherlands) AZ |
|---|---|---|
| | Report | Byskov 21'; Patati 27', 76'; Meerdink 79' |

Vazgen Sargsyan Republican Stadium, Yerevan
Attendance: 6,254
Referee: Patrik Kolarić (Croatia)

22 October 2026
18:45

| Ferencváros (Hungary) | 4–1 | (Portugal) Torreense |
|---|---|---|
| Yusuf 20'; Gómez 58'; Diadié 80' (o.g.); Lisztes 90' | Report | Pozo 23' |

Ferencváros Stadion, Budapest
Attendance: 15,973
Referee: Jérôme Brisard (France)

22 October 2026
18:45

| Dinamo Zagreb (Croatia) | 2–4 | (Netherlands) NEC |
|---|---|---|
| Beljo 33', 37' | Report | Bischoff 25'; Linssen 45'; Chery 54', 80' |

Maksimir Stadium, Zagreb
Attendance: 12,260
Referee: Manfredas Lukjančukas (Lithuania)

22 October 2026
18:45

| Juventus (Italy) | 2–2 | (France) Rennes |
|---|---|---|
| Çelik 5'; Woltemade 67' (pen.) | Report | Al-Taamari 15'; Dia 43' (pen.) |

Juventus Stadium, Turin
Attendance: 41,554
Referee: Morten Krogh (Denmark)

22 October 2026
18:45

| Lech Poznań (Poland) | 1–1 | (England) Sunderland |
|---|---|---|
| Bengtsson 70' | Report | Tutyerov 2' |

Poznań Stadium, Poznań
Attendance: 34,606
Referee: Balázs Berke (Hungary)

22 October 2026
18:45 (19:45 UTC+3)

| OFI (Greece) | 0–2 | (Germany) Bayer Leverkusen |
|---|---|---|
| | Report | Hofmann 35', 38' |

Pankritio Stadium, Heraklion
Attendance: 16,750
Referee: Oleksiy Derevinskyi (Ukraine)

22 October 2026
18:45

| Union Saint-Gilloise (Belgium) | 4–0 | (Israel) Hapoel Be'er Sheva |
|---|---|---|
| Florucz 45+1' (pen.); Guilherme Smith 61', 81'; Aquino 77' | Report |

Merkur Spiel-Arena, Düsseldorf (Note: Union Saint-Gilloise had scheduled to play their home matches at Den Dreef, Leuven, instead of their regular stadium, Joseph Marien Stadium, Brussels, which does not meet UEFA requirements. However, the mayor of Leuven prohibited the match against Israeli team Hapoel Be'er Sheva due to safety concerns.)
Attendance: 40
Referee: Mykola Balakin (Ukraine)

22 October 2026
18:45

| Sturm Graz (Austria) | 1–0 | (France) Marseille |
|---|---|---|
| Diakité 13' | Report |

Liebenauer Stadium, Graz
Attendance: 14,215
Referee: Nenad Minaković (Serbia)

22 October 2026
21:00 (20:00 UTC+1)

| Bournemouth (England) | 3–0 | (Italy) Milan |
|---|---|---|
| Kluivert 8' (pen.); Tavernier 32' (pen.); Adli 84' | Report |

Dean Court, Bournemouth
Attendance: 12,130
Referee: Vasilios Fotias (Greece)

22 October 2026
21:00 (22:00 UTC+3)

| Beşiktaş (Turkey) | 2–2 | (England) Crystal Palace |
|---|---|---|
| Ndidi 45+2'; Olaitan 73' | Report | Pino 51'; Mateta 55' |

Beşiktaş Stadium, Istanbul
Attendance: 38,622
Referee: Danny Makkelie (Netherlands)

22 October 2026
21:00 (20:00 UTC+1)

| Celtic (Scotland) | 1–2 | (Spain) Celta Vigo |
|---|---|---|
| Baur 47' | Report | Rodríguez 68', 71' |

Celtic Park, Glasgow
Attendance: 48,374
Referee: Georgi Kabakov (Bulgaria)

22 October 2026
21:00

| Viktoria Plzeň (Czech Republic) | 1–2 | (Bulgaria) Levski Sofia |
|---|---|---|
| Kabongo 62' | Report | Everton Bala 44'; Reinaldo 65' |

Doosan Arena, Plzeň
Attendance: 10,143
Referee: Alejandro Hernández Hernández (Spain)

22 October 2026
21:00

| Jagiellonia Białystok (Poland) | 0–3 | (Belgium) Anderlecht |
|---|---|---|
| | Report | Cvetković 22'; Winkler 72'; Onia Seke 80' |

Stadion Miejski, Białystok
Attendance: 15,621
Referee: Ondřej Berka (Czech Republic)

22 October 2026
21:00

| Lillestrøm (Norway) | 0–6 | (Spain) Real Sociedad |
|---|---|---|
| | Report | Gómez 25', 27'; Sučić 33', 72'; Óskarsson 64'; Zakharyan 80' |

Åråsen Stadion, Lillestrøm
Attendance: 9,657
Referee: Mohammad Al-Emara (Finland)

22 October 2026
21:00

| Celje (Slovenia) | 2–2 | (Austria) Red Bull Salzburg |
|---|---|---|
| Kramer 50'; Kučys 90' | Report | Kitano 9'; Lindstrøm 46' |

Stadion Z'dežele, Celje
Attendance: 4,050
Referee: John Brooks (England)

22 October 2026
21:00 (22:00 UTC+3)

| Olympiacos (Greece) | 1–0 | (Czech Republic) Sparta Prague |
|---|---|---|
| González 78' | Report |

Karaiskakis Stadium, Piraeus
Attendance: 31,993
Referee: Espen Eskås (Norway)

22 October 2026
21:00 (22:00 UTC+3)

| Omonia (Cyprus) | 1–4 | (Portugal) Benfica |
|---|---|---|
| Kakoullis 42' | Report | Négo 14' (o.g.); Pavlidis 49'; Aursnes 76'; Prestianni 85' |

GSP Stadium, Nicosia
Attendance: 14,378
Referee: Jasper Vergoote (Belgium)

22 October 2026
21:00

| TSG Hoffenheim (Germany) | 3–0 | (France) Lyon |
|---|---|---|
| Kramarić 45+4'; Daghim 49'; Hložek 83' | Report |

Rhein-Neckar-Arena, Sinsheim
Attendance: 21,029
Referee: Halil Umut Meler (Turkey)

=== Matchday 4 ===
4 November 2026
16:30 (Note: The Rennes v Olympiacos match, originally scheduled for 5 November 2026, 18:45 CET, was rescheduled to the day before, 16:30 CET, as French authorities were unable to guarantee the safety and security conditions required due to planned strikes and protests in France on that day.)

| Rennes (France) | 0–0 | (Greece) Olympiacos |
|---|---|---|
| | Report |

Roazhon Park, Rennes
Attendance: 27,276
Referee: Igor Pajač (Croatia)

5 November 2026
18:45

| Milan (Italy) | 0–2 | (Hungary) Ferencváros |
|---|---|---|
| | Report | Joseph 52', 66' |

San Siro, Milan
Attendance: 49,372
Referee: Urs Schnyder (Switzerland)

5 November 2026
18:45

| Sparta Prague (Czech Republic) | 1–3 | (England) Bournemouth |
|---|---|---|
| Singhateh 35' | Report | Adams 57'; Evanilson 81'; Rayan 90' |

Stadion Letná, Prague
Attendance: 17,377
Referee: Erik Lambrechts (Belgium)

5 November 2026
18:45 (17:45 UTC+0)

| Crystal Palace (England) | 1–1 | (Germany) TSG Hoffenheim |
|---|---|---|
| Kamada 90+1' | Report | Prass 7' |

Selhurst Park, London
Attendance: 18,741
Referee: Horațiu Feşnic (Romania)

5 November 2026
18:45

| Lillestrøm (Norway) | 0–1 | (Czech Republic) Viktoria Plzeň |
|---|---|---|
| | Report | Adu 10' |

Åråsen Stadion, Lillestrøm
Attendance: 6,461
Referee: Radoslav Gidzhenov (Bulgaria)

5 November 2026
18:45

| NEC (Netherlands) | 3–1 | (Cyprus) Omonia |
|---|---|---|
| Linssen 50', 76'; Bischoff 74' | Report | Diony 23' |

Goffertstadion, Nijmegen
Attendance: 11,442
Referee: Goga Kikacheishvili (Georgia)

5 November 2026
18:45 (19:45 UTC+2)

| Levski Sofia (Bulgaria) | 1–0 | (Poland) Jagiellonia Białystok |
|---|---|---|
| Stoyanchov 83' | Report |

Vasil Levski National Stadium, Sofia
Attendance: 23,301
Referee: Enea Jorgji (Albania)

5 November 2026
18:45

| Real Sociedad (Spain) | 1–1 | (France) Lyon |
|---|---|---|
| Óskarsson 28' | Report | Tolisso 54' |

Anoeta, San Sebastián
Attendance: 30,878
Referee: Anastasios Papapetrou (Greece)

5 November 2026
18:45

| Anderlecht (Belgium) | 2–0 | (Austria) Red Bull Salzburg |
|---|---|---|
| Augustinsson 20'; Winkler 90' | Report |

Constant Vanden Stock Stadium, Brussels
Attendance: 14,690
Referee: Elchin Masiyev (Azerbaijan)

5 November 2026
21:00

| AZ (Netherlands) | 1–2 | (Italy) Juventus |
|---|---|---|
| Meerdink 88' | Report | Koopmeiners 19'; Kolo Muani 37' |

AFAS Stadion, Alkmaar
Attendance: 18,954
Referee: Damian Sylwestrzak (Poland)

5 November 2026
21:00

| Bayer Leverkusen (Germany) | 0–1 | (France) Marseille |
|---|---|---|
| | Report | Gouiri 77' |

BayArena, Leverkusen
Attendance: 28,758
Referee: Orel Grinfeld (Israel)

5 November 2026
21:00 (20:00 UTC+0)

| Celtic (Scotland) | 3–2 | (Turkey) Beşiktaş |
|---|---|---|
| Osmand 62'; Durán 78', 87' | Report | Olaitan 54'; Kökçü 86' |

Celtic Park, Glasgow
Attendance: 44,394
Referee: Sascha Stegemann (Germany)

5 November 2026
21:00 (22:00 UTC+2)

| Hapoel Be'er Sheva (Israel) | 0–2 | (Greece) OFI |
|---|---|---|
| | Report | Poungouras 45+2'; Fountas 56' |

Rapid-Giulești Stadium, Bucharest, Romania
Attendance: 1,371
Referee: Edgars Maļcevs (Latvia)

5 November 2026
21:00

| Celta Vigo (Spain) | 1–2 | (Belgium) Union Saint-Gilloise |
|---|---|---|
| Durán 11' | Report | Zeneli 35', 49' |

Balaídos, Vigo
Attendance: 19,661
Referee: Aliyar Aghayev (Azerbaijan)

5 November 2026
21:00 (20:00 UTC+0)

| Torreense (Portugal) | 3–2 | Ararat-Armenia |
|---|---|---|
| Aguirre 13'; Vázquez 90+3'; Drammeh 90+5' | Report | Muradyan 41'; Wilson 58' |

Estádio Dr. Magalhães Pessoa, Leiria
Attendance: 1,679
Referee: Miloš Milanović (Serbia)

5 November 2026
21:00

| Sturm Graz (Austria) | 2–3 | (Slovenia) Celje |
|---|---|---|
| Diakité 40', 90+3' | Report | Sešlar 29', 73'; Verbič 45' |

Liebenauer Stadium, Graz
Attendance: 12,977
Referee: Giorgi Kruashvili (Georgia)

5 November 2026
21:00 (20:00 UTC+0)

| Benfica (Portugal) | 3–1 | (Poland) Lech Poznań |
|---|---|---|
| R. Silva 6'; Prestianni 67'; Sudakov 90' | Report | Bengtsson 72' |

Estádio da Luz, Lisbon
Attendance: 53,851
Referee: Martin Matoša (Slovenia)

5 November 2026
21:00 (20:00 UTC+0)

| Sunderland (England) | 0–2 | (Croatia) Dinamo Zagreb |
|---|---|---|
| | Report | Stojković 22'; Beljo 39' |

Stadium of Light, Sunderland
Attendance: 44,269
Referee: Andrea Colombo (Italy)

=== Matchday 5 ===
26 November 2026
18:45 (21:45 UTC+4)

| Beşiktaş (Turkey) | v | (Israel) Hapoel Be'er Sheva |
|---|---|---|
| | Report |

Batumi Arena, Batumi, Georgia (Note: Beşiktaş will play their home match against Hapoel Be'er Sheva at Batumi Arena, Batumi, instead of their regular stadium, Beşiktaş Stadium, Istanbul, due to security concerns.)

26 November 2026
18:45

| Red Bull Salzburg (Austria) | v | Ararat-Armenia |
|---|---|---|
| | Report |

Red Bull Arena, Salzburg

26 November 2026
18:45

| Viktoria Plzeň (Czech Republic) | v | (Portugal) Benfica |
|---|---|---|
| | Report |

Doosan Arena, Plzeň

26 November 2026
18:45

| Dinamo Zagreb (Croatia) | v | (Germany) Bayer Leverkusen |
|---|---|---|
| | Report |

Maksimir Stadium, Zagreb

26 November 2026
18:45 (19:45 UTC+2)

| Olympiacos (Greece) | v | (Italy) Milan |
|---|---|---|
| | Report |

Karaiskakis Stadium, Piraeus

26 November 2026
18:45

| Marseille (France) | v | (Bulgaria) Levski Sofia |
|---|---|---|
| | Report |

Stade Vélodrome, Marseille

26 November 2026
18:45

| Union Saint-Gilloise (Belgium) | v | (Poland) Lech Poznań |
|---|---|---|
| | Report |

Den Dreef, Leuven

26 November 2026
18:45

| Celta Vigo (Spain) | v | (England) Bournemouth |
|---|---|---|
| | Report |

Balaídos, Vigo

26 November 2026
21:00

| Sparta Prague (Czech Republic) | v | (Netherlands) AZ |
|---|---|---|
| | Report |

Stadion Letná, Prague

26 November 2026
21:00 (20:00 UTC+0)

| Crystal Palace (England) | v | (Spain) Real Sociedad |
|---|---|---|
| | Report |

Selhurst Park, London

26 November 2026
21:00

| Ferencváros (Hungary) | v | (Slovenia) Celje |
|---|---|---|
| | Report |

Ferencváros Stadion, Budapest

26 November 2026
21:00

| Juventus (Italy) | v | (Cyprus) Omonia |
|---|---|---|
| | Report |

Juventus Stadium, Turin

26 November 2026
21:00

| NEC (Netherlands) | v | (France) Rennes |
|---|---|---|
| | Report |

Goffertstadion, Nijmegen

26 November 2026
21:00 (22:00 UTC+2)

| OFI (Greece) | v | (Belgium) Anderlecht |
|---|---|---|
| | Report |

Pankritio Stadium, Heraklion

26 November 2026
21:00

| Lyon (France) | v | (Norway) Lillestrøm |
|---|---|---|
| | Report |

Parc Olympique Lyonnais, Décines-Charpieu

26 November 2026
21:00 (20:00 UTC+0)

| Torreense (Portugal) | v | (Scotland) Celtic |
|---|---|---|
| | Report |

Estádio Dr. Magalhães Pessoa, Leiria

26 November 2026
21:00 (20:00 UTC+0)

| Sunderland (England) | v | (Poland) Jagiellonia Białystok |
|---|---|---|
| | Report |

Stadium of Light, Sunderland

26 November 2026
21:00

| TSG Hoffenheim (Germany) | v | (Austria) Sturm Graz |
|---|---|---|
| | Report |

Rhein-Neckar-Arena, Sinsheim

=== Matchday 6 ===
10 December 2026
18:45

| AZ (Netherlands) | v | (Austria) Sturm Graz |
|---|---|---|
| | Report |

AFAS Stadion, Alkmaar

10 December 2026
18:45 (21:45 UTC+4)

| Ararat-Armenia | v | (Netherlands) NEC |
|---|---|---|
| | Report |

Vazgen Sargsyan Republican Stadium, Yerevan

10 December 2026
18:45 (19:45 UTC+2)

| Hapoel Be'er Sheva (Israel) | v | (Italy) Juventus |
|---|---|---|
| | Report |

Rapid-Giulești Stadium, Bucharest, Romania

10 December 2026
18:45

| Jagiellonia Białystok (Poland) | v | (England) Crystal Palace |
|---|---|---|
| | Report |

Stadion Miejski, Białystok

10 December 2026
18:45

| Marseille (France) | v | (Spain) Celta Vigo |
|---|---|---|
| | Report |

Stade Vélodrome, Marseille

10 December 2026
18:45 (19:45 UTC+2)

| Omonia (Cyprus) | v | (Scotland) Celtic |
|---|---|---|
| | Report |

GSP Stadium, Nicosia

10 December 2026
18:45

| Anderlecht (Belgium) | v | (Germany) TSG Hoffenheim |
|---|---|---|
| | Report |

Constant Vanden Stock Stadium, Brussels

10 December 2026
18:45

| Rennes (France) | v | (Croatia) Dinamo Zagreb |
|---|---|---|
| | Report |

Roazhon Park, Rennes

10 December 2026
21:00

| Milan (Italy) | v | (England) Sunderland |
|---|---|---|
| | Report |

San Siro, Milan

10 December 2026
21:00 (20:00 UTC+0)

| Bournemouth (England) | v | (Czech Republic) Viktoria Plzeň |
|---|---|---|
| | Report |

Dean Court, Bournemouth

10 December 2026
21:00

| Bayer Leverkusen (Germany) | v | (Turkey) Beşiktaş |
|---|---|---|
| | Report |

BayArena, Leverkusen

10 December 2026
21:00

| Red Bull Salzburg (Austria) | v | (Czech Republic) Sparta Prague |
|---|---|---|
| | Report |

Red Bull Arena, Salzburg

10 December 2026
21:00

| Lech Poznań (Poland) | v | (Hungary) Ferencváros |
|---|---|---|
| | Report |

Poznań Stadium, Poznań

10 December 2026
21:00

| Celje (Slovenia) | v | (Greece) Olympiacos |
|---|---|---|
| | Report |

Stadion Z'dežele, Celje

10 December 2026
21:00

| Lyon (France) | v | (Belgium) Union Saint-Gilloise |
|---|---|---|
| | Report |

Parc Olympique Lyonnais, Décines-Charpieu

10 December 2026
21:00 (22:00 UTC+2)

| Levski Sofia (Bulgaria) | v | (Norway) Lillestrøm |
|---|---|---|
| | Report |

Vasil Levski National Stadium, Sofia

10 December 2026
21:00

| Real Sociedad (Spain) | v | (Portugal) Torreense |
|---|---|---|
| | Report |

Anoeta, San Sebastián

10 December 2026
21:00 (20:00 UTC+0)

| Benfica (Portugal) | v | (Greece) OFI |
|---|---|---|
| | Report |

Estádio da Luz, Lisbon

=== Matchday 7 ===
21 January 2027
18:45 (20:45 UTC+3)

| Beşiktaş (Turkey) | v | (Belgium) Union Saint-Gilloise |
|---|---|---|
| | Report |

Beşiktaş Stadium, Istanbul

21 January 2027
18:45 (21:45 UTC+4)

| Ararat-Armenia | v | (Slovenia) Celje |
|---|---|---|
| | Report |

Vazgen Sargsyan Republican Stadium, Yerevan

21 January 2027
18:45

| Ferencváros (Hungary) | v | (Italy) Juventus |
|---|---|---|
| | Report |

Ferencváros Stadion, Budapest

21 January 2027
18:45

| Jagiellonia Białystok (Poland) | v | (France) Lyon |
|---|---|---|
| | Report |

Stadion Miejski, Białystok

21 January 2027
18:45

| Lillestrøm (Norway) | v | (England) Bournemouth |
|---|---|---|
| | Report |

Åråsen Stadion, Lillestrøm

21 January 2027
18:45

| NEC (Netherlands) | v | (Portugal) Benfica |
|---|---|---|
| | Report |

Goffertstadion, Nijmegen

21 January 2027
18:45 (19:45 UTC+2)

| Olympiacos (Greece) | v | (Germany) TSG Hoffenheim |
|---|---|---|
| | Report |

Karaiskakis Stadium, Piraeus

21 January 2027
18:45

| Real Sociedad (Spain) | v | (Czech Republic) Viktoria Plzeň |
|---|---|---|
| | Report |

Anoeta, San Sebastián

21 January 2027
18:45

| Sturm Graz (Austria) | v | (Greece) OFI |
|---|---|---|
| | Report |

Liebenauer Stadium, Graz

21 January 2027
21:00

| AZ (Netherlands) | v | (Croatia) Dinamo Zagreb |
|---|---|---|
| | Report |

AFAS Stadion, Alkmaar

21 January 2027
21:00

| Bayer Leverkusen (Germany) | v | (Austria) Red Bull Salzburg |
|---|---|---|
| | Report |

BayArena, Leverkusen

21 January 2027
21:00 (20:00 UTC+0)

| Celtic (Scotland) | v | (France) Marseille |
|---|---|---|
| | Report |

Celtic Park, Glasgow

21 January 2027
21:00 (20:00 UTC+0)

| Crystal Palace (England) | v | (Czech Republic) Sparta Prague |
|---|---|---|
| | Report |

Selhurst Park, London

21 January 2027
21:00 (22:00 UTC+2)

| Hapoel Be'er Sheva (Israel) | v | (Spain) Celta Vigo |
|---|---|---|
| | Report |

Rapid-Giulești Stadium, Bucharest, Romania

21 January 2027
21:00

| Lech Poznań (Poland) | v | (Portugal) Torreense |
|---|---|---|
| | Report |

Poznań Stadium, Poznań

21 January 2027
21:00 (22:00 UTC+2)

| Levski Sofia (Bulgaria) | v | (Italy) Milan |
|---|---|---|
| | Report |

Vasil Levski National Stadium, Sofia

21 January 2027
21:00

| Anderlecht (Belgium) | v | (England) Sunderland |
|---|---|---|
| | Report |

Constant Vanden Stock Stadium, Brussels

21 January 2027
21:00

| Rennes (France) | v | (Cyprus) Omonia |
|---|---|---|
| | Report |

Roazhon Park, Rennes

=== Matchday 8 ===
28 January 2027
21:00

| Milan (Italy) | v | Ararat-Armenia |
|---|---|---|
| | Report |

San Siro, Milan

28 January 2027
21:00

| Sparta Prague (Czech Republic) | v | (France) Rennes |
|---|---|---|
| | Report |

Stadion Letná, Prague

28 January 2027
21:00 (20:00 UTC+0)

| Bournemouth (England) | v | (Israel) Hapoel Be'er Sheva |
|---|---|---|
| | Report |

Dean Court, Bournemouth

28 January 2027
21:00

| Red Bull Salzburg (Austria) | v | (England) Crystal Palace |
|---|---|---|
| | Report |

Red Bull Arena, Salzburg

28 January 2027
21:00

| Viktoria Plzeň (Czech Republic) | v | (Poland) Jagiellonia Białystok |
|---|---|---|
| | Report |

Doosan Arena, Plzeň

28 January 2027
21:00

| Dinamo Zagreb (Croatia) | v | (Austria) Sturm Graz |
|---|---|---|
| | Report |

Maksimir Stadium, Zagreb

28 January 2027
21:00

| Juventus (Italy) | v | (Spain) Real Sociedad |
|---|---|---|
| | Report |

Juventus Stadium, Turin

28 January 2027
21:00

| Celje (Slovenia) | v | (Netherlands) NEC |
|---|---|---|
| | Report |

Stadion Z'dežele, Celje

28 January 2027
21:00 (22:00 UTC+2)

| OFI (Greece) | v | (Poland) Lech Poznań |
|---|---|---|
| | Report |

Pankritio Stadium, Heraklion

28 January 2027
21:00

| Marseille (France) | v | (Belgium) Anderlecht |
|---|---|---|
| | Report |

Stade Vélodrome, Marseille

28 January 2027
21:00

| Lyon (France) | v | (Germany) Bayer Leverkusen |
|---|---|---|
| | Report |

Parc Olympique Lyonnais, Décines-Charpieu

28 January 2027
21:00 (22:00 UTC+2)

| Omonia (Cyprus) | v | (Turkey) Beşiktaş |
|---|---|---|
| | Report |

GSP Stadium, Nicosia

28 January 2027
21:00

| Union Saint-Gilloise (Belgium) | v | (Scotland) Celtic |
|---|---|---|
| | Report |

Den Dreef, Leuven

28 January 2027
21:00

| Celta Vigo (Spain) | v | (Norway) Lillestrøm |
|---|---|---|
| | Report |

Balaídos, Vigo

28 January 2027
21:00 (20:00 UTC+0)

| Torreense (Portugal) | v | (Greece) Olympiacos |
|---|---|---|
| | Report |

Estádio Dr. Magalhães Pessoa, Leiria

28 January 2027
21:00 (20:00 UTC+0)

| Benfica (Portugal) | v | (Netherlands) AZ |
|---|---|---|
| | Report |

Estádio da Luz, Lisbon

28 January 2027
21:00 (20:00 UTC+0)

| Sunderland (England) | v | (Bulgaria) Levski Sofia |
|---|---|---|
| | Report |

Stadium of Light, Sunderland

28 January 2027
21:00

| TSG Hoffenheim (Germany) | v | (Hungary) Ferencváros |
|---|---|---|
| | Report |

Rhein-Neckar-Arena, Sinsheim
