= 2026–27 UEFA Europa League =

56th season of the UEFA club football tournament

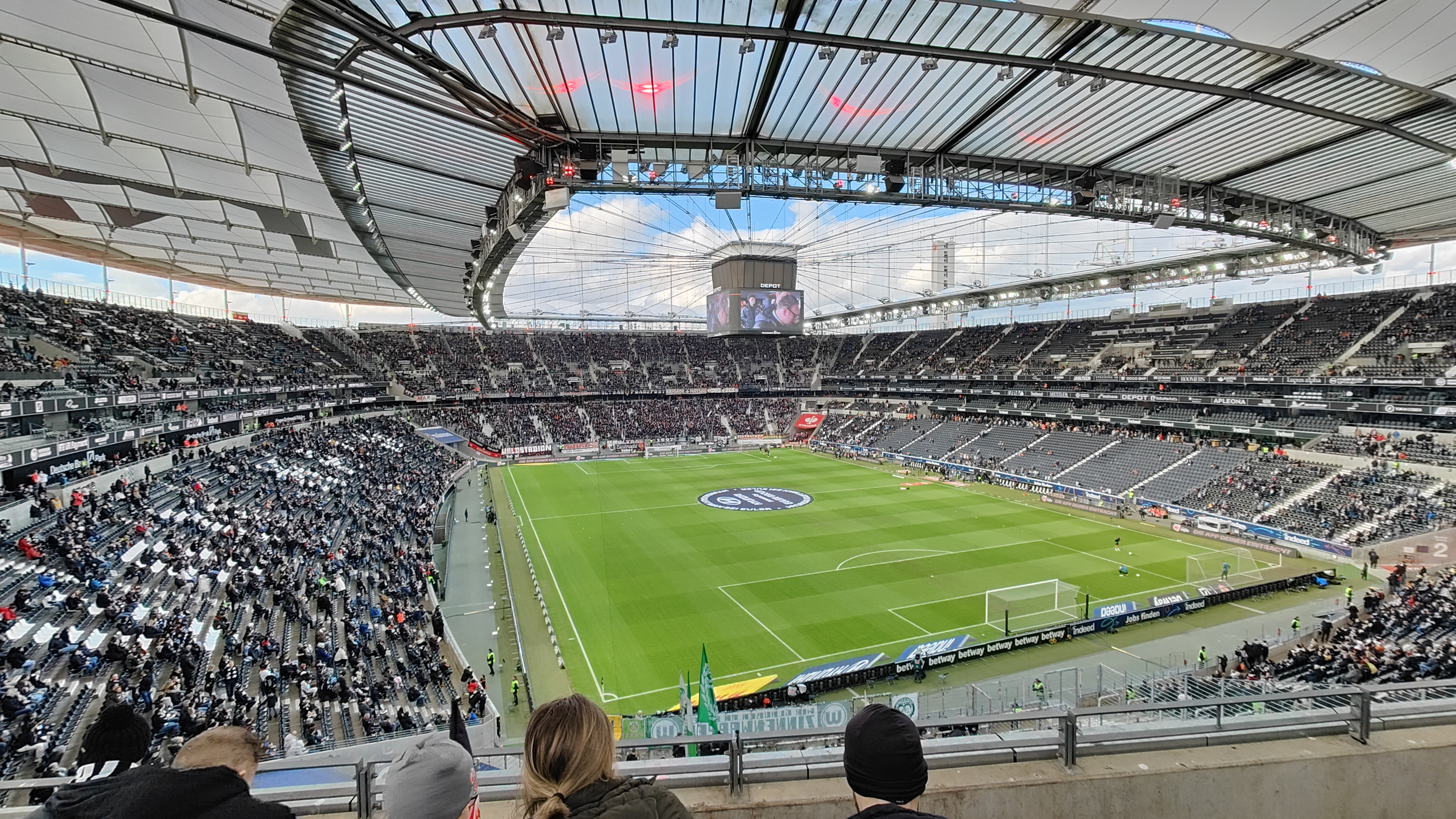
- The Waldstadion in Frankfurt will host the final

Tournament details
- Dates: Qualifying: 9 July – 27 August 2026; Competition proper: 16 September 2026 – 26 May 2027
- Teams: Competition proper: 25+11; Total: 45+31 (from 41 associations)

Tournament statistics
- Matches played: 72
- Goals scored: 214 (2.97 per match)
- Attendance: 1,632,861 (22,679 per match)
- Top scorer(s): Dion Drena Beljo (Dinamo Zagreb); Bryan Linssen (NEC); 4 goals each
- All statistics correct as of 5 November 2026.

The 2026–27 UEFA Europa League is the 56th season of Europe's secondary club football tournament organised by UEFA, and the 18th season since it was renamed from the UEFA Cup to the UEFA Europa League.

As the reigning champions, Aston Villa automatically qualified for the Champions League league phase, and are unable to defend their title as the new format does not allow clubs to transfer from the Champions League into the Europa League from the league phase onwards.

== Association team allocation ==
A total of 76 teams from 41 of the 55 UEFA member associations are participating in the 2026–27 UEFA Europa League. The association ranking based on the UEFA association coefficients was used to determine the number of participating teams for each association:

- The title holders of the 2025–26 UEFA Conference League received an entry into the Europa League (if they did not qualify for the Champions League or Europa League via league position).
- Associations 1–12 each have two teams.
- Associations 13–33 (except Russia) each have one team.
- Teams eliminated from the 2026–27 UEFA Champions League qualifying phase and play-off round (except from the first qualifying round) were transferred to the Europa League.

=== Association ranking ===
For the 2026–27 UEFA Europa League, the associations were allocated places according to their 2025 UEFA association coefficients, which took into account their performance in European competitions from 2020–21 to 2024–25.

Apart from the allocation based on the association coefficients, associations could have additional teams participating in the Europa League, as noted below:

- (UCL) – Additional teams transferred from the UEFA Champions League
- (CON) – Additional teams transferred from the UEFA Conference League

Association ranking for 2026–27 UEFA Europa League

Rank	Association	Coeff.	Teams	Notes
1	England	115.196	2	+1 (CON)
2	Italy	97.231	2	
3	Spain	94.453	2	
4	Germany	86.331	2	
5	France	73.093	2	+1 (UCL)
6	Netherlands	67.150	2	+1 (UCL)
7	Portugal	62.266	2	
8	Belgium	56.850	2	+1 (UCL)
9	Czech Republic	44.100	2	+1 (UCL)
10	Turkey	43.900	2	
11	Norway	39.687	2	
12	Greece	39.312	2	+1 (UCL)
13	Austria	36.450	1	+1 (UCL)
14	Scotland	35.550	1	+2 (UCL)
15	Poland	35.000	1	+2 (UCL)
16	Denmark	33.981	1	+1 (UCL)
17	Switzerland	33.625	1	+1 (UCL)
18	Israel	31.625	1	+1 (UCL)
19	Cyprus	27.537	1	+1 (UCL)

Rank	Association	Coeff.	Teams	Notes
20	Sweden	27.125	1	+1 (UCL)
21	Croatia	27.025	1	+1 (UCL)
22	Serbia	25.500	1	+1 (UCL)
23	Ukraine	24.400	1	
24	Hungary	24.000	1	
25	Romania	23.250	1	+1 (UCL)
26	Russia	22.632	0	
27	Slovakia	21.250	1	
28	Slovenia	20.343	1	+1 (UCL)
29	Bulgaria	19.875	1	+1 (UCL)
30	Azerbaijan	19.625	1	
31	Republic of Ireland	14.968	1	+1 (UCL)
32	Moldova	14.500	1	
33	Iceland	13.520	1	+1 (UCL)
34	Bosnia and Herzegovina	13.031	0	
35	Armenia	12.250	0	+1 (UCL)
36	Latvia	12.250	0	
37	Kosovo	12.041	0	
38	Finland	11.750	0	+1 (UCL)

Rank	Association	Coeff.	Teams	Notes
39	Kazakhstan	11.125	0	+1 (UCL)
40	Faroe Islands	10.750	0	+1 (UCL)
41	Malta	8.500	0	
42	Northern Ireland	8.333	0	+1 (UCL)
43	Lithuania	8.250	0	+1 (UCL)
44	Liechtenstein	8.000	0	
45	Estonia	7.957	0	
46	Albania	7.875	0	+1 (UCL)
47	Montenegro	7.208	0	
48	Luxembourg	6.875	0	
49	Wales	6.791	0	
50	Georgia	6.625	0	+1 (UCL)
51	North Macedonia	6.166	0	
52	Belarus	6.000	0	
53	Andorra	5.498	0	
54	Gibraltar	5.457	0	+1 (UCL)
55	San Marino	2.498	0	

=== Distribution ===
		Teams entering in this round	Teams advancing from the previous round	Teams transferred from Champions League
First qualifying round (12 teams)		12 domestic cup winners from associations 21–33 (except Russia)		
Second qualifying round (18 teams)		5 domestic cup winner from associations 16–20; 6 domestic league third-placed teams from associations 7–12; 1 domestic league fourth-placed team from association 6	6 winners from the first qualifying round	
Third qualifying round (26 teams)	Champions Path (12 teams)			12 losers from Champions League second qualifying round (Champions Path)
Third qualifying round (26 teams)	Main Path (14 teams)	3 domestic cup winners from associations 13–15	9 winners from second qualifying round	2 losers from Champions League second qualifying round (League Path)
Play-off round (24 teams)		5 domestic cup winners from associations 8–12	13 winners from third qualifying round	6 losers from Champions League third qualifying round (Champions Path)
League phase (36 teams)		UEFA Conference League title holders; 7 domestic cup winners from associations 1–7; 5 domestic league fifth-placed teams from associations 1–5	12 winners from play-off round	5 losers from Champions League play-off round (Champions Path); 4 losers from Champions League third qualifying round (League Path); 2 losers from Champions League play-off round (League Path)
Knockout phase play-offs (16 teams)			16 teams ranked 9–24 from the league phase	
Round of 16 (16 teams)			8 teams ranked 1–8 from the league phase; 8 winners from the knockout phase play-offs	

The information here reflects the ongoing suspension of Russia in European football, and so the following changes to the default access list were made:

- The cup winners of association 16 (Denmark) entered the second qualifying round instead of the first qualifying round.

As the Europa League title holders (Aston Villa) qualified for the Champions League via their domestic league's standard berth allocation, the following changes to the default access list were made:

- The cup winners of associations 17 to 20 (Switzerland, Israel, Cyprus, Sweden) entered the second qualifying round instead of the first qualifying round.

=== Teams ===
The labels in the parentheses show how each team qualified for the place of its starting round:

- CON: Conference League title holders
- CW: Cup winners
- 3rd, 4th, 5th, etc.: League position of the previous season
- CL: Transferred from the Champions League
  - CH/LP PO: Losers from the play-off round (Champions/League Path)
  - CH/LP Q3: Losers from the third qualifying round (Champions/League Path)
  - CH/LP Q2: Losers from the second qualifying round (Champions/League Path)

The third qualifying round was divided into Champions Path (CH) and Main Path (MP).

Qualified teams for 2026–27 UEFA Europa League
Entry round		Teams			
League phase		(England) Crystal Palace (CON)	(England) Bournemouth (6th)	(England) Sunderland (7th)	(Italy) Milan (5th)
League phase		(Italy) Juventus (6th)	(Spain) Real Sociedad (CW)	(Spain) Celta Vigo (6th)	(Germany) TSG Hoffenheim (5th)
League phase		(Germany) Bayer Leverkusen (6th)	(France) Marseille (5th)	(France) Rennes (6th)	(Netherlands) AZ (CW)
League phase		(Portugal) Torreense (CW)	(Scotland) Celtic (CL CH PO)	(Israel) Hapoel Be'er Sheva (CL CH PO)	(Croatia) Dinamo Zagreb (CL CH PO)
League phase		(Slovenia) Celje (CL CH PO)	(Bulgaria) Levski Sofia (CL CH PO)	(France) Lyon (CL LP PO)	(Netherlands) NEC (CL LP PO)
League phase		(Belgium) Union Saint-Gilloise (CL LP Q3)	(Czech Republic) Sparta Prague (CL LP Q3)	(Greece) Olympiacos (CL LP Q3)	(Austria) Sturm Graz (CL LP Q3)
Play-off round		(Belgium) Sint-Truiden (3rd)	(Czech Republic) Viktoria Plzeň (3rd)	(Turkey) Trabzonspor (CW)	(Norway) Lillestrøm (CW)
Play-off round		(Greece) OFI (CW)	(Denmark) AGF (CL CH Q3)	(Sweden) Mjällby AIF (CL CH Q3)	(Serbia) Red Star Belgrade (CL CH Q3)
Play-off round		Ararat-Armenia (CL CH Q3)	(Kazakhstan) Kairat (CL CH Q3)	(Lithuania) Kauno Žalgiris (CL CH Q3)	
Third qualifying round	CH	(Poland) Lech Poznań (CL CH Q2)	(Switzerland) Thun (CL CH Q2)	(Cyprus) Omonia (CL CH Q2)	(Romania) Universitatea Craiova (CL CH Q2)
Third qualifying round	CH	(Republic of Ireland) Shamrock Rovers (CL CH Q2)	(Iceland) Víkingur Reykjavík (CL CH Q2)	(Finland) KuPS (CL CH Q2)	(Faroe Islands) KÍ (CL CH Q2)
Third qualifying round	CH	(Northern Ireland) Larne (CL CH Q2)	(Albania) Egnatia (CL CH Q2)	(Georgia (country)) Iberia 1999 (CL CH Q2)	(Gibraltar) Lincoln Red Imps (CL CH Q2)
Third qualifying round	MP	(Austria) Red Bull Salzburg (3rd)	(Scotland) Rangers (3rd)	(Poland) Jagiellonia Białystok (3rd)	(Scotland) Heart of Midlothian (CL LP Q2)
Third qualifying round	MP	(Poland) Górnik Zabrze (CL LP Q2)			
Second qualifying round		(Netherlands) Twente (4th)	(Portugal) Benfica (3rd)	(Belgium) Anderlecht (4th)	(Czech Republic) Hradec Králové (4th)
Second qualifying round		(Turkey) Beşiktaş (4th)	(Norway) Tromsø (3rd)	(Greece) PAOK (3rd)	(Denmark) Midtjylland (CW)
Second qualifying round		(Switzerland) St. Gallen (CW)	(Israel) Maccabi Tel Aviv (CW)	(Cyprus) Pafos (CW)	(Sweden) Hammarby IF (2nd)
First qualifying round		(Croatia) Hajduk Split (2nd)	(Serbia) Vojvodina (2nd)	(Ukraine) Dynamo Kyiv (CW)	(Hungary) Ferencváros (CW)
First qualifying round		(Romania) Universitatea Cluj (2nd)	(Slovakia) Žilina (CW)	(Slovenia) Aluminij (CW)	(Bulgaria) CSKA Sofia (CW)
First qualifying round		(Azerbaijan) Qarabağ (2nd)	(Republic of Ireland) Derry City (2nd)	(Moldova) Sheriff Tiraspol (CW)	(Iceland) Vestri (CW)

Two teams not playing in a national top division are taking part in the competition: Torreense (2nd tier), Vestri (2nd tier).

Notes

1. Czech Republic (CZE): Karviná originally qualified for the play-off round as Czech Cup winners, but were disqualified for their involvement in a match-fixing scandal. Viktoria Plzeň, who originally qualified for the second qualifying round, were subsequently promoted to the play-off round, with Hradec Králové moving up from the Conference League to replace them. Jablonec subsequently took Hradec Králové's Conference League spot.
2. Russia (RUS): On 28 February 2022, Russian football clubs and national teams were suspended from FIFA and UEFA competitions due to the Russian invasion of Ukraine. The tables reflect Russia's ongoing suspension from UEFA competitions.

== Schedule ==
The schedule of the competition is as follows. Matches are scheduled for Thursdays, apart from the final, which takes place on a Wednesday, though exceptionally can take place on Tuesdays or Wednesdays due to scheduling conflicts.

Schedule for 2026–27 UEFA Europa League
Phase	Round	Draw date	First leg	Second leg
Qualifying	First qualifying round	16 June 2026	9 July 2026	16 July 2026
Qualifying	Second qualifying round	17 June 2026	23 July 2026	30 July 2026
Qualifying	Third qualifying round	20 July 2026	6 August 2026	13 August 2026
Play-offs	Play-off round	3 August 2026	20 August 2026	27 August 2026
League phase	Matchday 1	28 August 2026	16–17 September 2026	
League phase	Matchday 2	28 August 2026	15 October 2026	
League phase	Matchday 3	28 August 2026	22 October 2026	
League phase	Matchday 4	28 August 2026	5 November 2026	
League phase	Matchday 5	28 August 2026	26 November 2026	
League phase	Matchday 6	28 August 2026	10 December 2026	
League phase	Matchday 7	28 August 2026	21 January 2027	
League phase	Matchday 8	28 August 2026	28 January 2027	
Knockout phase	Knockout round play-offs	29 January 2027	18 February 2027	25 February 2027
Knockout phase	Round of 16	26 February 2027	11 March 2027	18 March 2027
Knockout phase	Quarter-finals	—N/a	8 April 2027	15 April 2027
Knockout phase	Semi-finals	—N/a	29 April 2027	6 May 2027
Knockout phase	Final	—N/a	26 May 2027 at Waldstadion, Frankfurt	

== Qualifying rounds ==
=== First qualifying round ===
The draw for the first qualifying round was held on 16 June 2026. The first legs were played on 9 July, and the second legs were played on 16 July 2026.

The winners of the ties advanced to the second qualifying round. The losers were transferred to the Conference League Main Path second qualifying round.

First qualifying round
Team 1	Agg.	Team 2	1st leg	2nd leg
Dynamo Kyiv (Ukraine)	0–0 (4–2 p)	(Romania) Universitatea Cluj	0–0	0–0 (a.e.t.)
Qarabağ (Azerbaijan)	6–0	(Iceland) Vestri	3–0	3–0
Hajduk Split (Croatia)	3–2	(Slovakia) Žilina	2–0	1–2
CSKA Sofia (Bulgaria)	5–3	(Republic of Ireland) Derry City	3–2	2–1
Sheriff Tiraspol (Moldova)	1–0	(Slovenia) Aluminij	0–0	1–0
Vojvodina (Serbia)	1–5	(Hungary) Ferencváros	1–2	0–3

=== Second qualifying round ===
The draw for the second qualifying round was held on 17 June 2026. The first legs were played on 23 July, and the second legs were played on 30 July 2026.

The winners of the ties advanced to the Main Path third qualifying round. The losers were transferred to the Conference League Main Path third qualifying round.

Second qualifying round
Team 1	Agg.	Team 2	1st leg	2nd leg
Hammarby IF (Sweden)	2–4	(Belgium) Anderlecht	1–1	1–3
Qarabağ (Azerbaijan)	0–0 (4–5 p)	(Bulgaria) CSKA Sofia	0–0	0–0 (a.e.t.)
Tromsø (Norway)	1–4	(Czech Republic) Hradec Králové	0–1	1–3
Twente (Netherlands)	3–4	(Hungary) Ferencváros	1–2	2–2
Beşiktaş (Turkey)	3–0	(Denmark) Midtjylland	1–0	2–0
Hajduk Split (Croatia)	2–4	(Cyprus) Pafos	2–0	0–4 (a.e.t.)
Sheriff Tiraspol (Moldova)	0–6	(Israel) Maccabi Tel Aviv	0–5	0–1
St. Gallen (Switzerland)	2–6	(Portugal) Benfica	2–1	0–5
Dynamo Kyiv (Ukraine)	2–5	(Greece) PAOK	2–3	0–2

=== Third qualifying round ===
The draw for the third qualifying round was held on 20 July 2026. The first legs were played on 4, 5 and 6 August, and the second legs were played on 11, 13 and 14 August 2026.

The winners of the ties advanced to the play-off round. The losers were transferred to the Conference League play-off round.

Third qualifying round
Team 1	Agg.	Team 2	1st leg	2nd leg
Champions Path
Larne (Northern Ireland)	1–2	(Georgia (country)) Iberia 1999	0–0	1–2 (a.e.t.)
Lincoln Red Imps (Gibraltar)	1–2	(Cyprus) Omonia	1–1	0–1
KuPS (Finland)	2–3	(Romania) Universitatea Craiova	1–1	1–2
Shamrock Rovers (Republic of Ireland)	4–6	(Albania) Egnatia	3–1	1–5
Lech Poznań (Poland)	6–0	(Faroe Islands) KÍ	1–0	5–0
Thun (Switzerland)	5–3	(Iceland) Víkingur Reykjavík	3–0	2–3
Main Path
Hradec Králové (Czech Republic)	0–2	(Turkey) Beşiktaş	0–1	0–1
Jagiellonia Białystok (Poland)	3–2	(Scotland) Rangers	2–1	1–1
PAOK (Greece)	2–4	(Belgium) Anderlecht	0–1	2–3
Red Bull Salzburg (Austria)	4–3 (Note: The order of the legs was reversed after the original draw because the Red Bull Arena was scheduled to host the UEFA Super Cup on 12 August.)	(Cyprus) Pafos	1–0	3–3
Benfica (Portugal)	7–2	(Scotland) Heart of Midlothian	6–1	1–1
Maccabi Tel Aviv (Israel)	3–4	(Bulgaria) CSKA Sofia	0–3	3–1
Ferencváros (Hungary)	2–1	(Poland) Górnik Zabrze	1–0	1–1

== Play-off round ==
The draw for the play-off round was held on 3 August 2026. The first legs were played on 20 August, and the second legs were played on 27 August 2026.

The winners of the ties advanced to the league phase. The losers were transferred to the Conference League league phase.

Play-off round
Team 1	Agg.	Team 2	1st leg	2nd leg
Trabzonspor (Turkey)	0–5	(Hungary) Ferencváros	0–1	0–4
Universitatea Craiova (Romania)	1–2	Ararat-Armenia	1–1	0–1
Sint-Truiden (Belgium)	3–4	(Cyprus) Omonia	1–0	2–4
Red Star Belgrade (Serbia)	4–5	(Czech Republic) Viktoria Plzeň	3–0	1–5 (a.e.t.)
Egnatia (Albania)	1–2	(Norway) Lillestrøm	0–0	1–2 (a.e.t.)
Jagiellonia Białystok (Poland)	6–1	(Georgia (country)) Iberia 1999	4–0	2–1
Mjällby AIF (Sweden)	0–4	(Austria) Red Bull Salzburg	0–1	0–3
Kairat (Kazakhstan)	0–6	(Belgium) Anderlecht	0–3	0–3
Lech Poznań (Poland)	9–2	(Switzerland) Thun	7–0	2–2
Beşiktaş (Turkey)	3–1	(Lithuania) Kauno Žalgiris	3–0	0–1
Benfica (Portugal)	6–2	(Denmark) AGF	3–1	3–1
OFI (Greece)	5–0	(Bulgaria) CSKA Sofia	3–0	2–0

== League phase ==
Location of teams in the 2026–27 UEFA Europa League league phase

Ararat-Armenia, Bournemouth, Celje, Crystal Palace, Jagiellonia Białystok, Lillestrøm, NEC, OFI, Sunderland and Torreense are making their debut appearances since the introduction of the group stage (although NEC had previously appeared in the UEFA Cup group stage).

Ararat-Armenia, Bournemouth, Lillestrøm, OFI, Sunderland and Torreense are making their debut appearances in a major UEFA competition group or league phase, with Bournemouth and Torreense qualifying for European football for the first time in their history.

Ararat-Armenia became the first team from Armenia to play in the Europa League group stage or league phase.

A total of 22 national associations are being represented in the league phase.

=== Table ===
Pos	Team	Pld	W	D	L	GF	GA	GD	Pts	Qualification
1	(Portugal) Benfica	4	4	0	0	13	3	+10	12	Advance to round of 16 (seeded)
2	(England) Bournemouth	4	4	0	0	11	2	+9	12	Advance to round of 16 (seeded)
3	(Hungary) Ferencváros	4	4	0	0	11	3	+8	12	Advance to round of 16 (seeded)
4	(Belgium) Union Saint-Gilloise	4	3	1	0	10	2	+8	10	Advance to round of 16 (seeded)
5	(Italy) Juventus	4	3	1	0	11	4	+7	10	Advance to round of 16 (seeded)
6	(Greece) Olympiacos	4	3	1	0	4	1	+3	10	Advance to round of 16 (seeded)
7	(Germany) Bayer Leverkusen	4	3	0	1	8	1	+7	9	Advance to round of 16 (seeded)
8	(Turkey) Beşiktaş	4	2	1	1	11	8	+3	7	Advance to round of 16 (seeded)
9	(Croatia) Dinamo Zagreb	4	2	1	1	5	4	+1	7	Advance to knockout phase play-offs (seeded)
10	(Bulgaria) Levski Sofia	4	2	1	1	4	3	+1	7	Advance to knockout phase play-offs (seeded)
11	(England) Sunderland	4	2	1	1	4	4	0	7	Advance to knockout phase play-offs (seeded)
12	(Netherlands) NEC	4	2	1	1	8	9	−1	7	Advance to knockout phase play-offs (seeded)
13	(France) Lyon	4	2	1	1	6	7	−1	7	Advance to knockout phase play-offs (seeded)
14	(Netherlands) AZ	4	2	0	2	7	4	+3	6	Advance to knockout phase play-offs (seeded)
15	(Belgium) Anderlecht	4	2	0	2	6	3	+3	6	Advance to knockout phase play-offs (seeded)
16	(Greece) OFI	4	2	0	2	5	4	+1	6	Advance to knockout phase play-offs (seeded)
17	(France) Rennes	4	1	3	0	4	3	+1	6	Advance to knockout phase play-offs (unseeded)
18	(Cyprus) Omonia	4	2	0	2	6	7	−1	6	Advance to knockout phase play-offs (unseeded)
19	(Portugal) Torreense	4	2	0	2	7	9	−2	6	Advance to knockout phase play-offs (unseeded)
20	(Spain) Real Sociedad	4	1	2	1	9	4	+5	5	Advance to knockout phase play-offs (unseeded)
21	(England) Crystal Palace	4	1	2	1	9	6	+3	5	Advance to knockout phase play-offs (unseeded)
22	(Czech Republic) Sparta Prague	4	1	1	2	6	6	0	4	Advance to knockout phase play-offs (unseeded)
23	(Germany) TSG Hoffenheim	4	1	1	2	6	6	0	4	Advance to knockout phase play-offs (unseeded)
24	(Austria) Sturm Graz	4	1	1	2	3	6	−3	4	Advance to knockout phase play-offs (unseeded)
25	(Slovenia) Celje	4	1	1	2	5	9	−4	4	
26	(Austria) Red Bull Salzburg	4	1	1	2	3	8	−5	4	
27	(Spain) Celta Vigo	4	1	0	3	4	6	−2	3	
28	(Italy) Milan	4	1	0	3	4	7	−3	3	
29	(Poland) Jagiellonia Białystok	4	1	0	3	4	7	−3	3	
30	(Czech Republic) Viktoria Plzeň	4	1	0	3	3	7	−4	3	
31	(France) Marseille	4	1	0	3	2	6	−4	3	
32	(Scotland) Celtic	4	1	0	3	6	11	−5	3	
33	(Israel) Hapoel Be'er Sheva	4	0	1	3	1	8	−7	1	
34	(Norway) Lillestrøm	4	0	1	3	2	10	−8	1	
35	(Poland) Lech Poznań	4	0	1	3	2	12	−10	1	
36	Ararat-Armenia	4	0	0	4	4	14	−10	0	

Updated to match(es) played on 5 November 2026. Source: UEFA
Rules for classification: League phase tiebreakers

=== Results ===
Matchday 1
Home team	Score	Away team
Ararat-Armenia	1–4	(Czech Republic) Sparta Prague
Omonia (Cyprus)	1–0	(Spain) Celta Vigo
Milan (Italy)	0–2	(Portugal) Benfica
Bayer Leverkusen (Germany)	2–0	(Slovenia) Celje
Hapoel Be'er Sheva (Israel)	0–0	(Croatia) Dinamo Zagreb
Olympiacos (Greece)	2–1	(Poland) Jagiellonia Białystok
Anderlecht (Belgium)	1–2	(France) Lyon
Sturm Graz (Austria)	0–0	(France) Rennes
Sunderland (England)	1–0	(Netherlands) AZ
OFI (Greece)	2–0	(Germany) TSG Hoffenheim
Levski Sofia (Bulgaria)	0–1	(Austria) Red Bull Salzburg
Beşiktaş (Turkey)	4–1	(France) Marseille
Celtic (Scotland)	1–3	(Hungary) Ferencváros
Crystal Palace (England)	4–0	(Poland) Lech Poznań
Viktoria Plzeň (Czech Republic)	0–3	(Belgium) Union Saint-Gilloise
Juventus (Italy)	5–0	(Netherlands) NEC
Lillestrøm (Norway)	1–2	(Portugal) Torreense
Real Sociedad (Spain)	1–2	(England) Bournemouth

Matchday 2
Home team	Score	Away team
Sparta Prague (Czech Republic)	1–1	(Norway) Lillestrøm
AZ (Netherlands)	2–1	(Israel) Hapoel Be'er Sheva
Red Bull Salzburg (Austria)	0–4	(Italy) Milan
Lech Poznań (Poland)	0–4	(Germany) Bayer Leverkusen
Celje (Slovenia)	0–3	(Cyprus) Omonia
Lyon (France)	3–2	(England) Crystal Palace
Union Saint-Gilloise (Belgium)	1–1	(Spain) Real Sociedad
Torreense (Portugal)	1–2	(England) Sunderland
Bournemouth (England)	3–0	(Austria) Sturm Graz
Ferencváros (Hungary)	2–1	(Czech Republic) Viktoria Plzeň
Dinamo Zagreb (Croatia)	1–0	(Belgium) Anderlecht
Jagiellonia Białystok (Poland)	3–1	Ararat-Armenia
NEC (Netherlands)	1–1	(Bulgaria) Levski Sofia
Marseille (France)	0–1	(Greece) Olympiacos
Celta Vigo (Spain)	1–2	(Italy) Juventus
Benfica (Portugal)	4–1	(Scotland) Celtic
Rennes (France)	2–1	(Greece) OFI
TSG Hoffenheim (Germany)	2–3	(Turkey) Beşiktaş

Matchday 3
Home team	Score	Away team
Ararat-Armenia	0–4	(Netherlands) AZ
Ferencváros (Hungary)	4–1	(Portugal) Torreense
Dinamo Zagreb (Croatia)	2–4	(Netherlands) NEC
Juventus (Italy)	2–2	(France) Rennes
Lech Poznań (Poland)	1–1	(England) Sunderland
OFI (Greece)	0–2	(Germany) Bayer Leverkusen
Union Saint-Gilloise (Belgium)	4–0	(Israel) Hapoel Be'er Sheva
Sturm Graz (Austria)	1–0	(France) Marseille
Bournemouth (England)	3–0	(Italy) Milan
Beşiktaş (Turkey)	2–2	(England) Crystal Palace
Celtic (Scotland)	1–2	(Spain) Celta Vigo
Viktoria Plzeň (Czech Republic)	1–2	(Bulgaria) Levski Sofia
Jagiellonia Białystok (Poland)	0–3	(Belgium) Anderlecht
Lillestrøm (Norway)	0–6	(Spain) Real Sociedad
Celje (Slovenia)	2–2	(Austria) Red Bull Salzburg
Olympiacos (Greece)	1–0	(Czech Republic) Sparta Prague
Omonia (Cyprus)	1–4	(Portugal) Benfica
TSG Hoffenheim (Germany)	3–0	(France) Lyon

Matchday 4
Home team	Score	Away team
Rennes (France)	0–0	(Greece) Olympiacos
Milan (Italy)	0–2	(Hungary) Ferencváros
Sparta Prague (Czech Republic)	1–3	(England) Bournemouth
Crystal Palace (England)	1–1	(Germany) TSG Hoffenheim
Lillestrøm (Norway)	0–1	(Czech Republic) Viktoria Plzeň
NEC (Netherlands)	3–1	(Cyprus) Omonia
Levski Sofia (Bulgaria)	1–0	(Poland) Jagiellonia Białystok
Real Sociedad (Spain)	1–1	(France) Lyon
Anderlecht (Belgium)	2–0	(Austria) Red Bull Salzburg
AZ (Netherlands)	1–2	(Italy) Juventus
Bayer Leverkusen (Germany)	0–1	(France) Marseille
Celtic (Scotland)	3–2	(Turkey) Beşiktaş
Hapoel Be'er Sheva (Israel)	0–2	(Greece) OFI
Celta Vigo (Spain)	1–2	(Belgium) Union Saint-Gilloise
Torreense (Portugal)	3–2	Ararat-Armenia
Sturm Graz (Austria)	2–3	(Slovenia) Celje
Benfica (Portugal)	3–1	(Poland) Lech Poznań
Sunderland (England)	0–2	(Croatia) Dinamo Zagreb

Matchday 5
Home team	Score	Away team
Beşiktaş (Turkey)	26 Nov	(Israel) Hapoel Be'er Sheva
Red Bull Salzburg (Austria)	26 Nov	Ararat-Armenia
Viktoria Plzeň (Czech Republic)	26 Nov	(Portugal) Benfica
Dinamo Zagreb (Croatia)	26 Nov	(Germany) Bayer Leverkusen
Olympiacos (Greece)	26 Nov	(Italy) Milan
Marseille (France)	26 Nov	(Bulgaria) Levski Sofia
Union Saint-Gilloise (Belgium)	26 Nov	(Poland) Lech Poznań
Celta Vigo (Spain)	26 Nov	(England) Bournemouth
Sparta Prague (Czech Republic)	26 Nov	(Netherlands) AZ
Crystal Palace (England)	26 Nov	(Spain) Real Sociedad
Ferencváros (Hungary)	26 Nov	(Slovenia) Celje
Juventus (Italy)	26 Nov	(Cyprus) Omonia
NEC (Netherlands)	26 Nov	(France) Rennes
OFI (Greece)	26 Nov	(Belgium) Anderlecht
Lyon (France)	26 Nov	(Norway) Lillestrøm
Torreense (Portugal)	26 Nov	(Scotland) Celtic
Sunderland (England)	26 Nov	(Poland) Jagiellonia Białystok
TSG Hoffenheim (Germany)	26 Nov	(Austria) Sturm Graz

Matchday 6
Home team	Score	Away team
AZ (Netherlands)	10 Dec	(Austria) Sturm Graz
Ararat-Armenia	10 Dec	(Netherlands) NEC
Hapoel Be'er Sheva (Israel)	10 Dec	(Italy) Juventus
Jagiellonia Białystok (Poland)	10 Dec	(England) Crystal Palace
Marseille (France)	10 Dec	(Spain) Celta Vigo
Omonia (Cyprus)	10 Dec	(Scotland) Celtic
Anderlecht (Belgium)	10 Dec	(Germany) TSG Hoffenheim
Rennes (France)	10 Dec	(Croatia) Dinamo Zagreb
Milan (Italy)	10 Dec	(England) Sunderland
Bournemouth (England)	10 Dec	(Czech Republic) Viktoria Plzeň
Bayer Leverkusen (Germany)	10 Dec	(Turkey) Beşiktaş
Red Bull Salzburg (Austria)	10 Dec	(Czech Republic) Sparta Prague
Lech Poznań (Poland)	10 Dec	(Hungary) Ferencváros
Celje (Slovenia)	10 Dec	(Greece) Olympiacos
Lyon (France)	10 Dec	(Belgium) Union Saint-Gilloise
Levski Sofia (Bulgaria)	10 Dec	(Norway) Lillestrøm
Real Sociedad (Spain)	10 Dec	(Portugal) Torreense
Benfica (Portugal)	10 Dec	(Greece) OFI

Matchday 7
Home team	Score	Away team
Beşiktaş (Turkey)	21 Jan	(Belgium) Union Saint-Gilloise
Ararat-Armenia	21 Jan	(Slovenia) Celje
Ferencváros (Hungary)	21 Jan	(Italy) Juventus
Jagiellonia Białystok (Poland)	21 Jan	(France) Lyon
Lillestrøm (Norway)	21 Jan	(England) Bournemouth
NEC (Netherlands)	21 Jan	(Portugal) Benfica
Olympiacos (Greece)	21 Jan	(Germany) TSG Hoffenheim
Real Sociedad (Spain)	21 Jan	(Czech Republic) Viktoria Plzeň
Sturm Graz (Austria)	21 Jan	(Greece) OFI
AZ (Netherlands)	21 Jan	(Croatia) Dinamo Zagreb
Bayer Leverkusen (Germany)	21 Jan	(Austria) Red Bull Salzburg
Celtic (Scotland)	21 Jan	(France) Marseille
Crystal Palace (England)	21 Jan	(Czech Republic) Sparta Prague
Hapoel Be'er Sheva (Israel)	21 Jan	(Spain) Celta Vigo
Lech Poznań (Poland)	21 Jan	(Portugal) Torreense
Levski Sofia (Bulgaria)	21 Jan	(Italy) Milan
Anderlecht (Belgium)	21 Jan	(England) Sunderland
Rennes (France)	21 Jan	(Cyprus) Omonia

Matchday 8
Home team	Score	Away team
Milan (Italy)	28 Jan	Ararat-Armenia
Sparta Prague (Czech Republic)	28 Jan	(France) Rennes
Bournemouth (England)	28 Jan	(Israel) Hapoel Be'er Sheva
Red Bull Salzburg (Austria)	28 Jan	(England) Crystal Palace
Viktoria Plzeň (Czech Republic)	28 Jan	(Poland) Jagiellonia Białystok
Dinamo Zagreb (Croatia)	28 Jan	(Austria) Sturm Graz
Juventus (Italy)	28 Jan	(Spain) Real Sociedad
Celje (Slovenia)	28 Jan	(Netherlands) NEC
OFI (Greece)	28 Jan	(Poland) Lech Poznań
Marseille (France)	28 Jan	(Belgium) Anderlecht
Lyon (France)	28 Jan	(Germany) Bayer Leverkusen
Omonia (Cyprus)	28 Jan	(Turkey) Beşiktaş
Union Saint-Gilloise (Belgium)	28 Jan	(Scotland) Celtic
Celta Vigo (Spain)	28 Jan	(Norway) Lillestrøm
Torreense (Portugal)	28 Jan	(Greece) Olympiacos
Benfica (Portugal)	28 Jan	(Netherlands) AZ
Sunderland (England)	28 Jan	(Bulgaria) Levski Sofia
TSG Hoffenheim (Germany)	28 Jan	(Hungary) Ferencváros

== Statistics ==
Statistics exclude qualifying rounds and play-off round.

Table correct as of 5 November 2026

=== Top goalscorers ===
Rank	Player	Team	Goals	Minutes played
1	(Croatia) Dion Drena Beljo	(Croatia) Dinamo Zagreb	4	250
1	(Netherlands) Bryan Linssen	(Netherlands) NEC	4	343
3	(Brazil) Rayan	(England) Bournemouth	3	137
3	(Ivory Coast) Oumar Diakité	(Austria) Sturm Graz	3	193
3	(France) Randal Kolo Muani	(Italy) Juventus	3	210
3	(Netherlands) Mexx Meerdink	(Netherlands) AZ	3	212
3	(Italy) Alphadjo Cisse	(Italy) Milan	3	252
3	(Colombia) Camilo Durán	(Scotland) Celtic	3	289
3	(Spain) Yeremy Pino	(England) Crystal Palace	3	327
3	(Germany) Nick Woltemade	(Italy) Juventus	3	341
3	(Norway) Kristoffer Zachariassen	(Hungary) Ferencváros	3	352
3	(Spain) Sergio Gómez	(Spain) Real Sociedad	3	360

== See also ==
- 2026–27 UEFA Champions League
- 2026–27 UEFA Conference League
- 2026–27 UEFA Women's Champions League
- 2026–27 UEFA Women's Europa Cup
