= João Cancelo =

Portuguese footballer (born 1994)

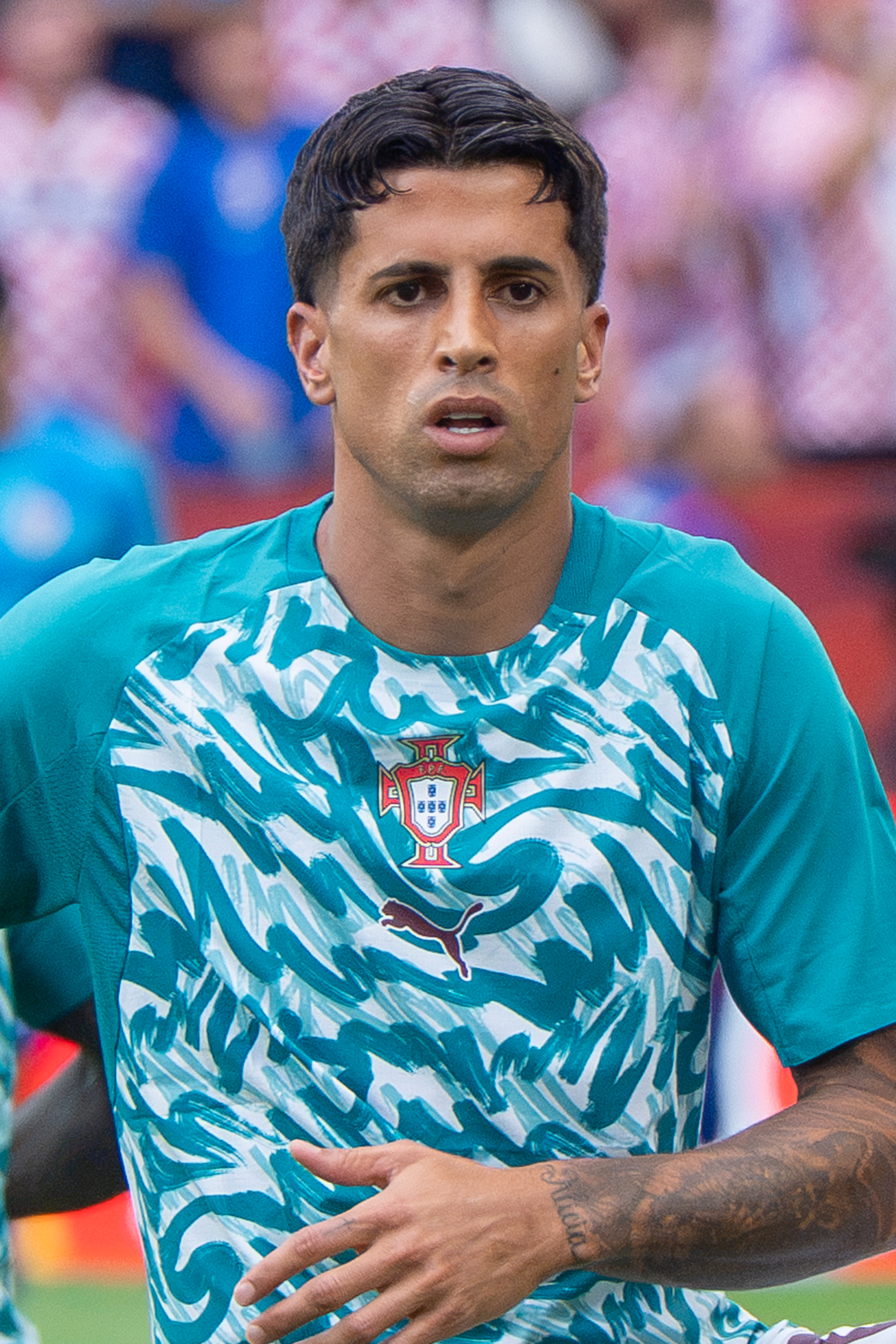
- Cancelo with Portugal in 2026

Personal information
- Full name: João Pedro Cavaco Cancelo
- Date of birth: 27 May 1994 (age 32)
- Place of birth: Barreiro, Portugal
- Height: 1.82 m (6 ft 0 in)
- Position: Full-back

Team information
- Current team: Barcelona
- Number: 2

Youth career
- 2002–2007: Barreirense
- 2007–2012: Benfica

Senior career*
Years	Team	Apps	(Gls)
2012–2014	Benfica B	51	(2)
2014–2015	Benfica	1	(0)
2014–2015	→ Valencia (loan)	10	(0)
2015–2018	Valencia	64	(2)
2017–2018	→ Inter Milan (loan)	26	(1)
2018–2019	Juventus	25	(1)
2019–2024	Manchester City	98	(5)
2023	→ Bayern Munich (loan)	15	(1)
2023–2024	→ Barcelona (loan)	32	(2)
2024–2026	Al Hilal	24	(0)
2026	→ Barcelona (loan)	16	(2)
2026–	Barcelona	10	(1)

International career^{‡}
2010	Portugal U16	6	(0)
2010–2011	Portugal U17	17	(1)
2011–2012	Portugal U18	7	(0)
2012–2013	Portugal U19	25	(1)
2013–2014	Portugal U20	9	(0)
2014–2017	Portugal U21	11	(1)
2016–	Portugal	78	(14)
Medal record
Representing Portugal
UEFA Nations League
Winner	2019 Portugal
UEFA European Under-21 Championship
Runner-up	2015 Czech Republic
- * Club domestic league appearances and goals as of 21:08, 22 November 2026 (UTC) ‡ National team caps and goals as of 23:00, 17 November 2026 (UTC)

João Pedro Cavaco Cancelo (born 27 May 1994) is a Portuguese professional footballer who plays as a right-back or left-back for La Liga club Barcelona and the Portugal national team.

After spending most of his youth career at Benfica, Cancelo began his professional senior career with them, before moving to Valencia permanently in May 2015. After a loan to Inter Milan in August 2017, Italian rivals Juventus signed him the following June, winning a Serie A title and the Supercoppa Italiana with them. In the summer of 2019, Cancelo joined Manchester City, he made 154 appearances for the club, and won the UEFA Champions League, three Premier League titles, two League Cups, and one FA Cup. In the 2020–21 season, he played a significant role in Manchester City reaching their first UEFA Champions League final and was also recognised as the best player in the Premier League, according to performance data.

In January 2023, he was loaned to Bayern Munich, winning a Bundesliga title, while being part of City's team that won continental treble, and Barcelona in August. The following August, Cancelo signed for Saudi club Al-Hilal, only to return to Barcelona on loan in January 2026, winning a La Liga title, making him the only player to win league titles in all of Europe's top four leagues.

Cancelo made his senior debut for Portugal in 2016, after previously being capped by the nations's all youth team levels, being part of the under-21 team that reached the 2015 UEFA European Championship final. He was chosen in Portugal's squads for two FIFA World Cups (2022 and 2026) and one UEFA European Championship (2024). He was also part of Portugal's team at the 2019 UEFA Nations League Finals on home soil, winning the inaugural edition of the competition with his nation.

== Club career ==
=== Benfica ===
Born in Barreiro, Setúbal District, Cancelo started playing football with local club Barreirense. He joined Benfica's youth system in 2007 at the age of 13, where he played at full back.

On 28 July 2012, Cancelo made his debut with Benfica's first team in a friendly against Gil Vicente where he played the full 90 minutes as a right back. Despite being registered with the reserve team, he was touted as a possible replacement to Maxi Pereira in the seniors; until 2013 he also represented the juniors, and on 18 May of that year he scored the two decisive goals in a 2–1 win over Rio Ave to win the national championship.

Cancelo played his first competitive game with Benfica's main squad on 25 January 2014, coming on as a late substitute in the 1–0 home success against Gil Vicente for the Taça da Liga, which was later won. His maiden appearance in the Primeira Liga occurred on 10 May after they had already been crowned league champions, and he started in a 2–1 loss in O Clássico against Porto.

=== Valencia ===
==== 2014–16: Debut season and regular starter ====
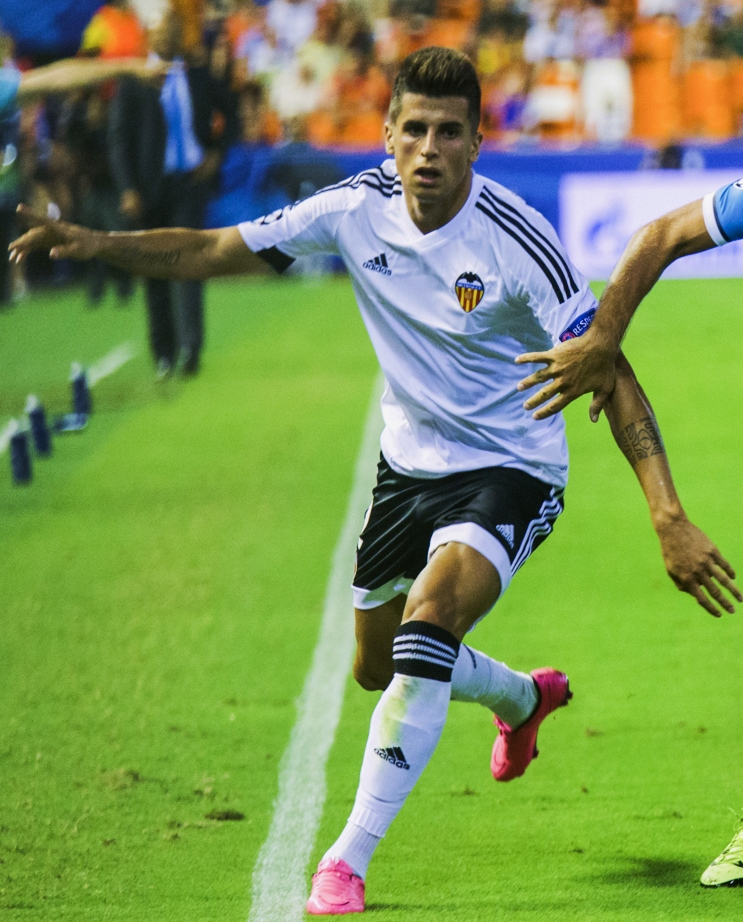
Cancelo playing for Valencia in 2015

On 20 August 2014, Cancelo joined Valencia on a one-year loan with the option to purchase for €15 million. Although his economic rights were owned by Peter Lim, a loan was arranged to take him to Valencia due to Lim's purchase of the latter club.

His La Liga debut occurred on 25 September, playing the entirety of a 3–0 home win over Córdoba; He initially started as a substitute and appeared in the round of 16 round of the Copa del Rey in the first leg against Rayo Vallecano. He would also occasionally move to the right wing and later his good performances, specially against Levante on 12 April 2015, in which he was awarded the man of the match. Throughout the season, he was used a second-choice right back behind Antonio Barragán, finishing the season with 13 appearances, across all competitions. Cancelo's performances helped Valencia reach the 2015–16 UEFA Champions League, leading him, on 25 May, to agree to a permanent contract with the club until 30 June 2021, for a transfer fee of €15 million.

In the following season, Cancelo became a starter earning his debut in the Champions League on 16 September, where he scored his first goal for Los Che in a 2–3 home loss to Zenit Saint Petersburg. In doing so, he became the fifth youngest scorer in Valencia's history in the Champions League (aged 21 years and 107 days). On 2 December, Cancelo scored his first goal Copa del Rey in a 3–1 victory over Barakaldo. Valencia was eliminated from the tournament after losing 8–1 on aggregate to Barcelona. He also netted for the first time in the league the following 20 April to conclude a 4–0 win over Eibar at the Mestalla Stadium.

==== 2016–17: Final season with Valencia ====
In the 2016–17 season, Cancelo's performances slightly declined, with Cancelo making an error leading him to conceding a penalty in Valencia's first league match in a 2–4 loss against Las Palmas. Despite his errors, Cancelo's performances improved, leading him to be used more often with new coach Cesare Prandelli, changing his position to the right-wing. Cancelo was fixed in the eleven throughout the season, playing almost the same number of games between the right back and the right wing. On 2 April he scored his first league goal in a 3–0 victory against Deportivo La Coruña. Afterwards, Cancelo made a "shush" gesture towards Valencia's fans, who criticized him for his defensive errors, but he immediately apologized for the gesture.

==== 2017–18: Loan to Inter Milan ====
On 22 August 2017, Cancelo joined Inter Milan on a one-year loan until 30 June 2018 with the option of making the move permanent. The deal was part of a loan exchange, with Geoffrey Kondogbia moving in the other direction. He made his Serie A debut four days later, replacing Antonio Candreva in the 83rd minute of a 3–1 win away to Roma.

Cancelo suffered a knee ligament injury in late August 2017 while on international duty, going on to be sidelined for one-and-a-half months. He returned to action during the 3–2 home victory over AC Milan in the Derby della Madonnina, featuring 20 minutes. After a few weeks of adaptation in the Serie A, Cancelo made his debut as a starter at the Coppa Italia in a home victory against Pordenone. On 17 April 2018, he scored his first league goal with a free kick in a 4–0 home victory over Cagliari.

During his phase of adaptation in Serie A, in which was added some tactical misunderstanding, his performances began progressively improving, leading him to be included in Serie A's Team of the Year. Despite his good performances during the season, the club opted to not buy Cancelo.

=== Juventus ===
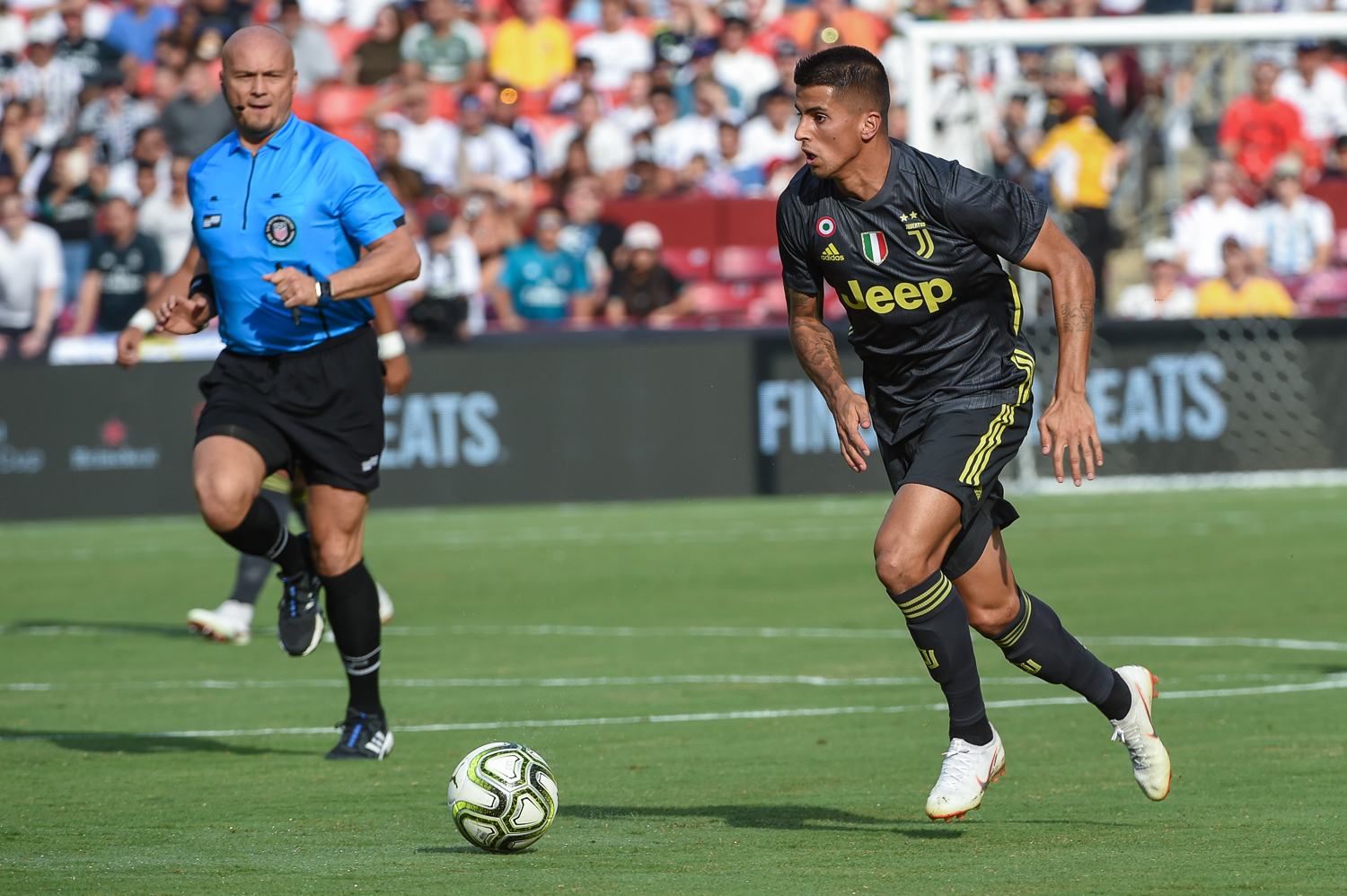
Cancelo playing for Juventus in 2018

On 27 June 2018, Cancelo was signed by Juventus on a five-year contract for €40.4 million, making his domestic league debut on 18 August in a 3–2 away win against Chievo Verona.

He scored his first league goal the same month, as his team came from behind to defeat Lazio 2–1 at the Stadio Olimpico in Rome; he also helped win the decisive match-winning penalty later during the same game, which was subsequently converted by compatriot Cristiano Ronaldo. On 6 October, Cancelo provided an assist for Rodrigo Bentancur in a 2–0 away win over Udinese. On 7 December, Cancelo provided an assist for Mario Mandžukić in a 1–0 home win against his former club Inter Milan in the Derby d'Italia.

He won his first trophy with the club in January 2019, featuring the entire 1–0 victory over Milan for the Supercoppa Italiana. On 10 April, Cancelo provided an assist for his compatriot Cristiano Ronaldo in a 1–1 away draw in the first leg of Juventus' Champions League quarter-final against Ajax, on 10 April. In the second leg in Turin on 16 April, Juventus eventually lost the match 2–1, and were eliminated from the competition. Four days later, Cancelo played in the Scudetto-clinching match against rivals Fiorentina, as Juventus won their eighth successive league title after a 2–1 home triumph.

=== Manchester City ===
==== 2019–23: Struggles, consecutive Premier League titles and European Final ====
On 7 August 2019, Cancelo signed for Premier League club Manchester City on a six-year contract worth £27.4 million plus Danilo being sent to Juventus in part-exchange, equalling to £60 million, making him the most expensive right back ever.

On 25 August, he made his Premier League debut against Bournemouth appearing as a late substitute for Kyle Walker in a 3–1 victory. On 18 December, he scored his first goal for City in a 3–1 away win over Oxford United in the quarter-finals of the EFL Cup. Initially, Cancelo struggled during his first season in the club, looking out of position in the matches he played and failing to seal a starting spot in the team due to competing against Kyle Walker for a right-back spot.

Cancelo playing for Manchester City in 2021

On 17 October 2020, Cancelo made his first league start for the new season after an injury in a 1–0 home win over Arsenal. On 3 November, he scored his first Champions League goal for City in a 3–0 home win over Olympiacos in the group stage, and on 26 January 2021, he scored his first Premier League goal in a 5–0 away win over West Bromwich Albion. On 24 February, he was named man of the match, after providing an assist to Bernardo Silva in Manchester City's 2–0 away win over Borussia Mönchengladbach in the first leg of the round of 16 tie.

During the season, Cancelo's ability to come inside from full back to maintain control of the ball in central midfield position, while ensuring his team was in a more stable defensive shape when possession was lost, was praised as being one of the key factors in Manchester City regaining the Premier League title that season, while also being named in the PFA Premier League Team of the Year.

On 17 October 2021, Cancelo scored his first goal of the season for City in a 6–3 home Champions League group stage win against RB Leipzig. On 3 November, Cancelo provided a hat-trick of assists for Phil Foden, Riyad Mahrez and Gabriel Jesus in a 4–1 Champions League group stage home victory against Club Brugge, leading him to be named man of the match. On 6 November, in the Manchester derby, Cancelo created both goals in a 2–0 victory against Manchester United at Old Trafford, forcing an Eric Bailly own goal and providing an assist for Bernardo Silva, for his fifth assist of the season in two games. On 19 December, on his 100th appearance for the club, he scored a long-range shot and provided an assist in a 4–0 win against Newcastle United.

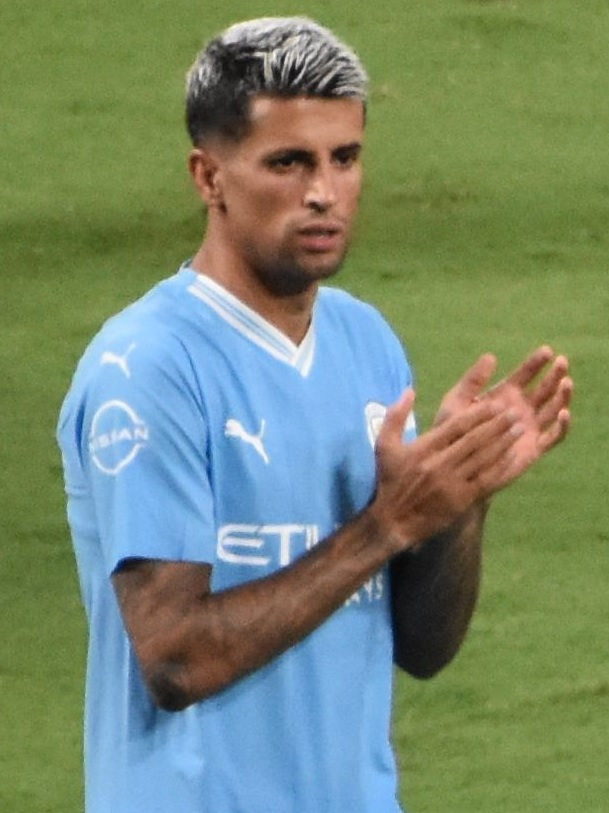
Cancelo playing for Manchester City in 2023

Following the 2022 FIFA World Cup, in January 2023, it was reported by The Athletic that Cancelo had fallen out with his manager Pep Guardiola over a lack of playing time. He had begun losing his place to in the starting eleven to Nathan Aké and Rico Lewis, after returning from the tournament. After again featuring on the bench for the third game in a row in a FA Cup match against Arsenal, their relationship reached the breaking point, which led to Cancelo being told to leave the club by Guardiola.

==== 2022–23: Loan to Bayern Munich ====
On 31 January, Cancelo was loaned to Bayern Munich for the remainder of the season with an option to buy for €70 million (£61.6 million).

Cancelo made his debut for Bayern in a 4–0 DFB-Pokal win over Mainz 05, registering an assist for Eric Maxim Choupo-Moting's goal. On 11 March, he scored his first goal the club in a 5–3 win over Augsburg in the Bundesliga. On 12 April, having been drawn against each other in the quarter-finals of the Champions League, Cancelo came on as an 80th-minute substitute against parent club Manchester City as Bayern were defeated 3–0 in the first leg at the Etihad Stadium. During the match, Cancelo was booed by sections of the City supporters, leading Guardiola to defend him against the criticism, reminding that he had been an important player for Manchester City in the previous seasons and that his "quality was undeniable". The following week on 19 April, Bayern were knocked out 4–1 on aggregate following a 1–1 draw in the second leg, with Cancelo starting the game before being replaced in the 63rd minute.

On 27 May, Cancelo played the full 90 minutes of a 2–1 victory over FC Köln, to clinch the 11th consecutive league title for his club ahead of rivals Borussia Dortmund on goal difference. Cancelo became the third player, after Daniel Amartey and David Beckham, to win two league titles in different countries in a single season. He was also part of City's team that won the continental treble, having played half-season with them. At the end of the season, Bayern opted to not activate Cancelo's buy-out clause, in order to prioritize funds for other signings, with his departure being confirmed by the club on 1 July.

==== 2023–24: Loan to Barcelona ====
Following his loan move to Bayern, Cancelo rejoined Manchester City for pre-season, although he did not feature in any of City's opening three Premier League fixtures, the FA Community Shield or the UEFA Super Cup, as he sought to finalise a move away from the club. On 3 August, Cancelo agreed personal terms to join La Liga club Barcelona, with the club's manager Xavi, who wanted to sign him in January, identifying him as a priority target. In the final moments of the summer transfer window, Bayern contacted Manchester City to potentially acquiring Cancelo on loan, due to Barcelona's financial difficulties involving La Liga's Financial Fair Play regulations, however, on 1 September, Barcelona confirmed the signing of Cancelo on a season-long loan, after La Liga accepted the financial guarantees offered by Barcelona's board, which in turn allowed him to be registered in La Liga.

He made his debut two days later as a 59th-minute substitute in a 2–1 away win over Osasuna. On 16 September, Cancelo scored his first goal for the club, netting a strike from inside the box in his first start, as Barcelona's home league game against Real Betis ended in a dominant 5–0 win, which earned him the La Liga Goal of the Month award, followed by an assist and a last-minute winner, helping Barcelona overturn a two-goal deficit in a 3–2 home victory against Celta Vigo on 23 September. On 28 November, he scored and assisted in a 2–1 comeback at home against his first club's rivals Porto in the Champions League group stage, winning man of the match and securing the club's spot in the round of sixteen for the first time since 2020–21 season.

=== Al-Hilal ===
On 27 August 2024, Cancelo signed for Saudi Pro League club Al-Hilal on a three-year contract in a deal reportedly worth £21.2m.

==== 2026: Second loan to Barcelona ====
On 13 January 2026, Barcelona announced that they had resigned Cancelo on loan for the rest of the season, being handed the number 2 shirt. He made his second debut for the club on 19 January 2026, coming off the bench during an away game against Real Sociedad which Barcelona eventually lost 2–1. On 10 May, Cancelo played the full 90 minutes of a 2–0 victory over Real Madrid in El Clásico, with Barcelona clinching their second consecutive league title. As a result, he became the first player to win four of five Europe's top five leagues titles (only missing Ligue 1).

=== Barcelona ===
On 20 August 2026, Cancelo completed a permanent move to Barcelona, signing a three-year contract with the club.

== International career ==
=== Youth ===
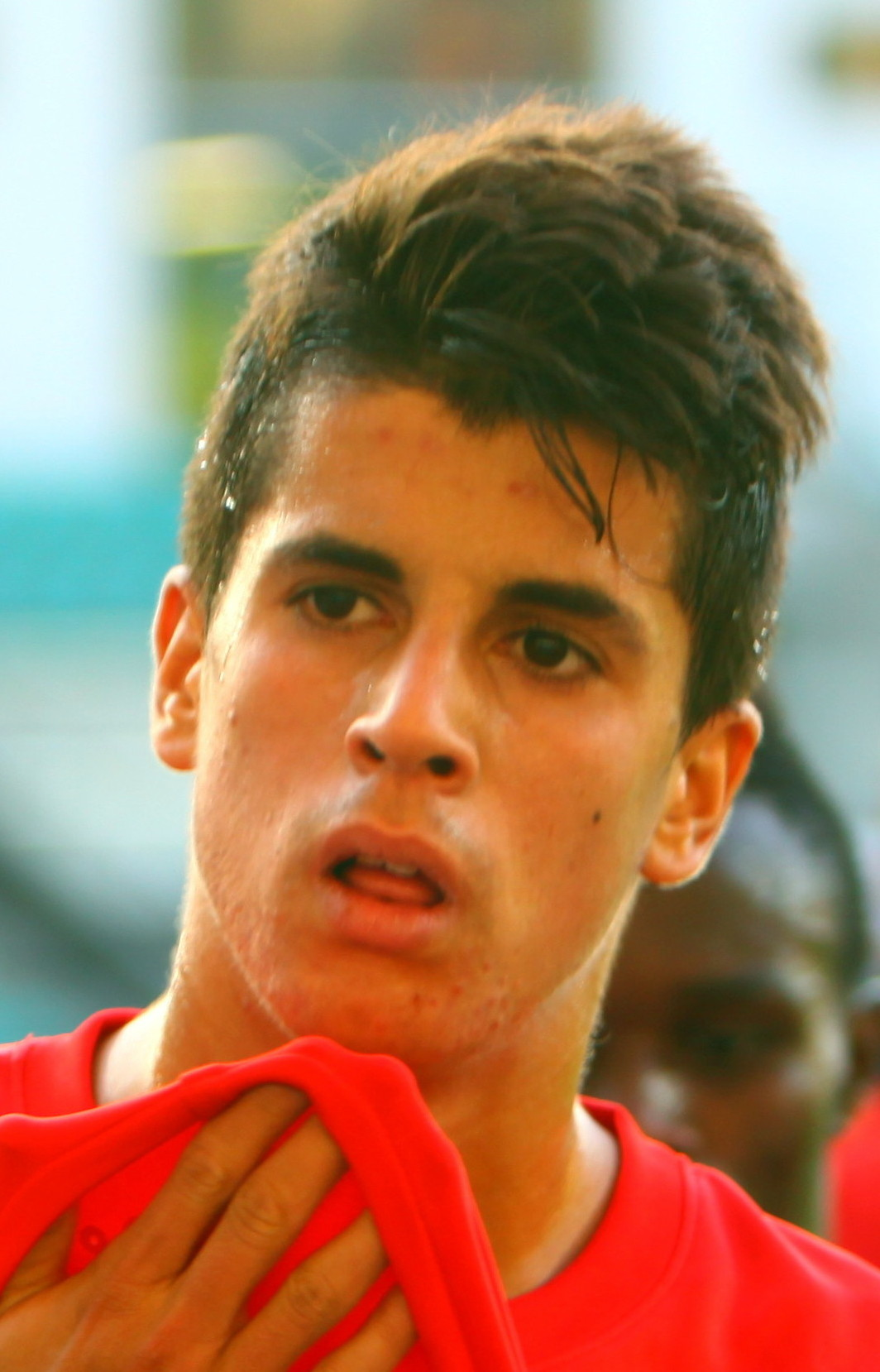
Cancelo playing for Portugal U19 in 2012

Cancelo represented Portugal in the 2012 UEFA European Under-19 Championship. He was also selected for the following edition in Lithuania.

With the under-20s, Cancelo appeared at the 2013 FIFA U-20 World Cup and the 2014 Toulon Tournament. He featured in two games in the former competition, with the country reaching the round of 16.

Cancelo was part of the under-21 squad that competed in the 2015 UEFA European Under-21 Championship. He replaced left-back Raphaël Guerreiro midway through the second half of the 5–0 semi-final win against Germany for his only appearance of the tournament, in a final runner-up finish to Sweden.

=== Senior ===
Cancelo was called up for the first time to the senior team by head coach Fernando Santos on 26 August 2016, playing the full 90 minutes of a 5–0 friendly win over Gibraltar in Porto on 1 September and scoring the third goal. In the following month he added another two, in as many 2018 FIFA World Cup qualifiers against Andorra (6–0, home) and Faroe Islands (away, same score).

In May 2018, Cancelo was included in a preliminary 35-man squad for the finals in Russia, but he did not make the final cut. Cancelo was selected for all four matches in the league phase of the 2018–19 UEFA Nations League group stage, helping the hosts Portugal qualify to the inaugural Nations League Finals in June 2019. In the UEFA Nations League Finals, Portugal defeated the Netherlands 1–0 in Porto to win the trophy.

Cancelo was initially included in Portugal's squad for UEFA Euro 2020 in June 2021; however, he tested positive for COVID-19 two days prior to the team's opening match against Hungary, and was replaced in the squad by Diogo Dalot.

In October 2022, he was named in Portugal's preliminary 55-man squad for the 2022 FIFA World Cup in Qatar, being included in the final 26-man squad for the tournament. Cancelo initially started Portugal's group stage matches, but amid a bad run of form, he lost his place to Diogo Dalot, who started the team's round of 16 game against Switzerland, with Portugal winning the match 6–1. In the quarter-final against Morocco, Cancelo again started on the bench, coming on for Raphaël Guerreiro in the 51st minute as Portugal lost 1–0.

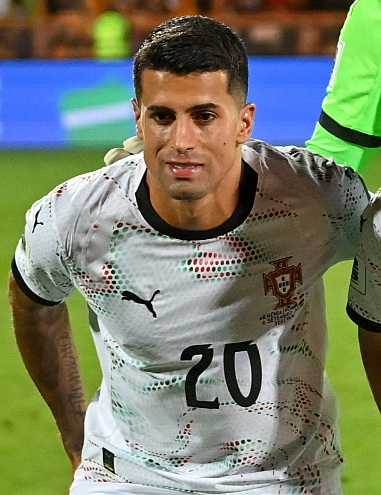
Cancelo with Portugal in 2025

During UEFA Euro 2024 qualifying, Cancelo appeared nine times and scored three goals as Portugal won all ten matches in Group J. On 21 May 2024, Cancelo was named in Portugal's squad for UEFA Euro 2024 in Germany. He started the team's opening match against Czechia, where he was substituted for Nélson Semedo in the 90th minute. He then played the first 68 minutes against Turkey, assisting Samet Akaydin 28th-minute own goal. He was rested for the final Group F fixture against Georgia which Portugal lost 2–0. He was restored to the starting line-up for Portugal's round of 16 match against Slovenia and played 117 minutes as Portugal won 3–0 in a penalty shootout after the match ended in a 0–0 draw. Portugal were eliminated in the quarter-finals to France after losing 5–3 in another penalty shootout.

On 19 May 2026, Cancelo was selected in the 26-man squad for the 2026 FIFA World Cup. In Portugal's second group match on 23 June, he assisted Cristiano Ronaldo's opening goal in a 5–0 over Uzbekistan.

== Style of play ==
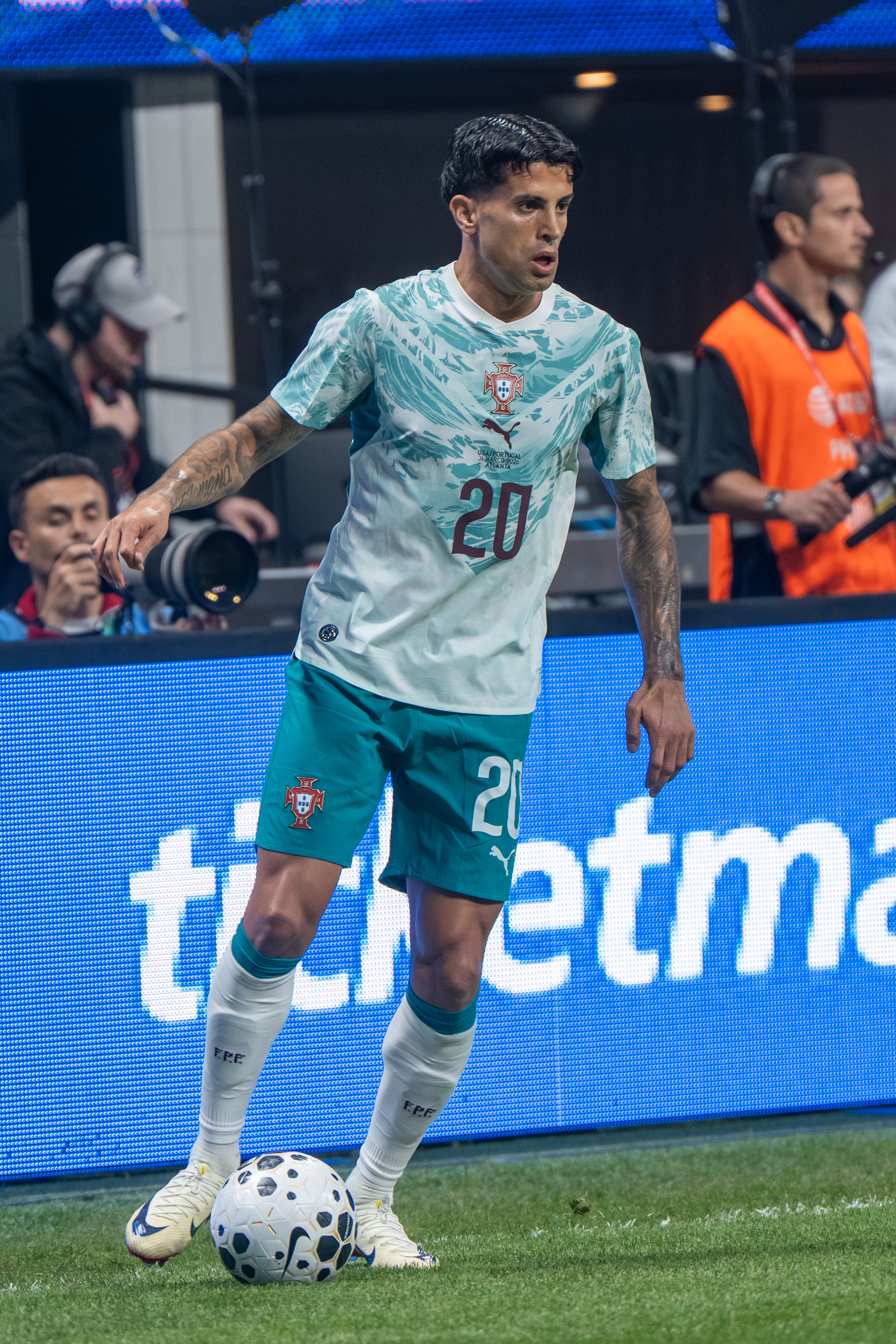
Cancelo with Portugal in 2026

Cancelo is known for his speed, energy and offensive capabilities, as well as his technique, dribbling skills, creativity and crossing ability. He is capable of playing as a full back or winger on either flank, although he usually plays on the right. During his time at Manchester City, he was considered one of the best full backs in Europe. Despite his ability going forward, however, his tactical sense, positioning, and defensive skills have been cited as weaknesses in the media.

When playing as a traditional full back he times his forward runs well. He tends to move forward when in possession rather than making lung-busting overlapping runs around the outside of a teammate, and he prefers to receive to feet rather than chase through balls. On the ball, he is equally capable of cutting infield from the right as he is going around the outside, and will regularly look to cross with his weaker left foot or drive inside the opposing left back and look to combine with those further forward. He is a very strong dribbler and that ability, combined with the fact he is confident on either foot, makes him extremely difficult to defend against. His speed also allow him to be fast enough that to recover at defensive transitions, and is always aware of the space he leaves behind him when his team attacks.

In his second season in Manchester City, under manager Pep Guardiola, Cancelo was developed into one of his hybrid players, who plays both at full back and in central midfield in the same game. During City's 4–3–3 formation, when out of possession, Cancelo moved into central midfield alongside Rodri, leaving five players to form their attacking line. With their back three spread wide across the pitch, Cancelo, Rodri and two attacking midfielders often form a box in midfield to overload central areas. If City play centrally, Cancelo is often their target – he has proved brilliant at receiving in central midfield and progressing play with daring and accurate forward passes. Cancelo also become one of City's most effective creative players, often adopting positions in either half-space before delivering a ball into the penalty area or slipping a through ball between defenders. When in a more withdrawn position, Cancelo is adept at moving into central midfield and playing a ball over the top for a runner in behind. With Cancelo instead adding an extra player in midfield, their attack is better set up to deal with defensive transitions.

== Personal life ==
In January 2013, Cancelo's mother Filomena was killed in a car accident on the A2 motorway in Seixal. Cancelo and his brother were asleep and received only minor injuries. Due to the emotional toll it took on him, Cancelo considered retiring from football.

Cancelo and his girlfriend Daniela Machado had a daughter, Alicia, in December 2019. On 30 December 2021, their Manchester home was burgled by four men who stole some of his personal jewellery. Cancelo retaliated in self-defence and suffered facial injuries, but said that his family were safe. In 2024, the couple had their second daughter, Camila.

== Career statistics ==
=== Club ===
As of match played 22 November 2026

Appearances and goals by club, season and competition
Club	Season	League			National cup (Note: Includes Copa del Rey, Coppa Italia, FA Cup, DFB-Pokal, King's Cup)		League cup (Note: Includes Taça da Liga, EFL Cup)		Continental		Other		Total	
Club	Season	Division	Apps	Goals	Apps	Goals	Apps	Goals	Apps	Goals	Apps	Goals	Apps	Goals
Benfica B	2012–13	Segunda Liga	20	1	—		—		—		—		20	1
Benfica B	2013–14	Segunda Liga	31	1	—		—		—		—		31	1
Benfica B	Total		51	2	—		—		—		—		51	2
Benfica	2013–14	Primeira Liga	1	0	0	0	1	0	0	0	—		2	0
Valencia (loan)	2014–15	La Liga	10	0	3	0	—		—		—		13	0
Valencia	2015–16	La Liga	28	1	4	1	—		7 (Note: Six appearances and one goal in UEFA Champions League, one appearance in UEFA Europa League)	1	—		39	3
Valencia	2016–17	La Liga	35	1	3	0	—		—		—		38	1
Valencia	2017–18	La Liga	1	0	—		—		—		—		1	0
Valencia	Valencia total		74	2	10	1	—		7	1	—		91	4
Inter Milan (loan)	2017–18	Serie A	26	1	2	0	—		—		—		28	1
Juventus	2018–19	Serie A	25	1	1	0	—		7 (Note: Appearances in UEFA Champions League)	0	1 (Note: Appearance in Supercoppa Italiana)	0	34	1
Manchester City	2019–20	Premier League	17	0	4	0	4	1	8	0	—		33	1
Manchester City	2020–21	Premier League	28	2	3	0	3	0	9	1	—		43	3
Manchester City	2021–22	Premier League	36	1	5	0	1	0	9	2	1 (Note: Appearance in FA Community Shield)	0	52	3
Manchester City	2022–23	Premier League	17	2	1	0	1	0	6	0	1	0	26	2
Manchester City	Total		98	5	13	0	9	1	32	3	2	0	154	9
Bayern Munich (loan)	2022–23	Bundesliga	15	1	2	0	—		4	0	—		21	1
Barcelona (loan)	2023–24	La Liga	32	2	0	0	—		10	2	0	0	42	4
Al Hilal	2024–25	Saudi Pro League	22	0	3	0	—		9 (Note: Appearances in AFC Champions League Elite)	2	5 (Note: Appearances in FIFA Club World Cup)	0	39	2
Al Hilal	2025–26	Saudi Pro League	2	0	0	0	—		4	1	—		6	1
Al Hilal	Total		24	0	3	0	—		13	3	5	0	45	3
Barcelona (loan)	2025–26	La Liga	16	2	3	0	—		4	0	—		23	2
Barcelona	2026–27	La Liga	10	1	0	0	—		4	1	0	0	14	2
Barcelona	Barcelona total		26	3	3	0	—		8	1	0	0	37	4
Career total			373	18	34	1	10	1	81	11	7	0	504	29

=== International ===
As of match played 17 November 2026

Appearances and goals by national team and year
National team	Year	Apps	Goals
Portugal	2016	4	3
Portugal	2017	2	0
Portugal	2018	6	0
Portugal	2019	4	0
Portugal	2020	7	1
Portugal	2021	8	1
Portugal	2022	10	2
Portugal	2023	9	3
Portugal	2024	10	0
Portugal	2025	4	2
Portugal	2026	14	2
Total		78	14

As of match played 9 September 2025
Portugal score listed first, score column indicates score after each Cancelo goal.

List of international goals scored by João Cancelo
No.	Date	Venue	Cap	Opponent	Score	Result	Competition	Ref.
1	1 September 2016	Estádio do Bessa, Porto, Portugal	1	Gibraltar	3–0	5–0	Friendly	
2	7 October 2016	Estádio Municipal de Aveiro, Aveiro, Portugal	2	Andorra	3–0	6–0	2018 FIFA World Cup qualification	
3	10 October 2016	Tórsvøllur, Tórshavn, Faroe Islands	3	Faroe Islands	6–0	6–0	2018 FIFA World Cup qualification	
4	5 September 2020	Estádio do Dragão, Porto, Portugal	16	Croatia	1–0	4–1	2020–21 UEFA Nations League A	
5	9 June 2021	Estádio José Alvalade, Lisbon, Portugal	26	Israel	3–0	4–0	Friendly	
6	5 June 2022	Estádio José Alvalade, Lisbon, Portugal	33	Switzerland	4–0	4–0	2022–23 UEFA Nations League A	
7	9 June 2022	Estádio José Alvalade, Lisbon, Portugal	34	Czech Republic	1–0	2–0	2022–23 UEFA Nations League A	
8	23 March 2023	Estádio José Alvalade, Lisbon, Portugal	41	Liechtenstein	1–0	4–0	UEFA Euro 2024 qualifying	
9	16 October 2023	Bilino Polje Stadium, Zenica Bosnia and Herzegovina	48	Bosnia and Herzegovina	4–0	5–0	UEFA Euro 2024 qualifying	
10	16 November 2023	Rheinpark Stadion, Vaduz, Liechtenstein	49	Liechtenstein	2–0	2–0	UEFA Euro 2024 qualifying	
11	6 September 2025	Vazgen Sargsyan Republican Stadium, Yerevan, Armenia	61	Armenia	3–0	5–0	2026 FIFA World Cup qualification	
12	9 September 2025	Puskás Aréna, Budapest, Hungary	62	Hungary	3–2	3–2	2026 FIFA World Cup qualification	
13	1 October 2026	Parken Stadium, Copenhagen, Denmark	76	Denmark	1–0	4–2	2026–27 UEFA Nations League A	
14	4 October 2026	Estádio do Dragão, Porto, Portugal	77	Norway	1–1	2–1	2026–27 UEFA Nations League A	

== Honours ==
Benfica

- Primeira Liga: 2013–14
- Taça de Portugal: 2013–14
- Taça da Liga: 2013–14
- Supertaça Cândido de Oliveira: 2014
- UEFA Europa League runner-up: 2013–14

Juventus

- Serie A: 2018–19
- Supercoppa Italiana: 2018

Manchester City

- Premier League: 2020–21, 2021–22, 2022–23
- FA Cup: 2022–23
- EFL Cup: 2019–20, 2020–21
- UEFA Champions League: 2022–23

Bayern Munich

- Bundesliga: 2022–23

Barcelona

- La Liga: 2025–26

Portugal U21

- UEFA European Under-21 Championship runner-up: 2015

Portugal

- UEFA Nations League: 2018–19

Individual

- Serie A Team of the Year: 2017–18, 2018–19
- PFA Premier League Team of the Year: 2020–21, 2021–22
- ESM Team of the Year: 2020–21, 2021–22
- CIES Football Observatory Best Player in the Premier League (performance data by InStat): 2020–21
- UEFA Champions League Fantasy Football Team of the Season: 2021–22
- FIFA FIFPRO World 11: 2022
- La Liga Goal of the Month: September 2023, September 2026

=== Records ===
- The first footballer in history to win the titles in five of Europe’s Top leagues: with Benfica, Juventus, Manchester City, Bayern Munich and FC Barcelona
