= Instat =

Instat may refer to:

- InStat, sports performance analysis company.
- Institute of Statistics (Albania), the statistical agency.
