= 2013–14 Taça da Liga =

Tournament details
- Host country: Portugal
- Dates: 27 July 2013 – 7 May 2014
- Teams: 33

Final positions
- Champions: Benfica (5th title)
- Runners-up: Rio Ave

Tournament statistics
- Matches played: 71
- Goals scored: 159 (2.24 per match)
- Top scorer(s): Jackson Martínez; Tozé Marreco; Ricardo Pessoa; Wágner; Moreira (3 goals each)

The 2013–14 Taça da Liga was the seventh edition of the Taça da Liga, a Portuguese football knockout competition organized by the Portuguese League for Professional Football (LPFP). It was contested by the 33 clubs competing in the 2013–14 Primeira Liga and 2013–14 Segunda Liga, the top two tiers and only professional leagues in Portuguese football. The competition began in July 2013 with first-round matches and concluded on 7 May 2014, with the final at the Estádio Dr. Magalhães Pessoa in Leiria, where Benfica defeated Rio Ave 2–0 to win a fifth Taça da Liga title.

== Format ==
The competition format for the 2013–14 edition consists of three rounds plus a knockout phase. In the first round, only teams competing in the 2013–14 Segunda Liga (excluding reserve teams from Primeira Liga clubs) take part. The seventeen teams are drawn into four groups (three with four teams and one with five), where each team plays against the others in a single round-robin format. The group winners and runners-up advance to the second round.

In the second round, the eight teams that qualified from the previous round are joined by the six Primeira Liga teams placed ninth to 14th in the previous season and the two teams promoted to 2013–14 Primeira Liga. Two-legged home-and-away fixtures are played between Segunda Liga teams qualifying from the first round and Primeira Liga teams entering this round, and the winner advances to the third round.

The third round features the eight winners of the previous round the remaining eight Primeira Liga teams, ranked 1st to 8th in the previous season. Similarly to the first round, the sixteen teams are drawn into four groups of four teams, according to a seeding based on their classification in the previous season. Each team plays against the other three in a single round-robin format, and only the group winners advance to the knockout phase. The knockout phase consists of semi-finals and one final, both decided in one-legged fixtures. The final match is played at a neutral venue.

Round	Teams entering in this round	Teams advancing from previous round
First round (17 teams)	17 teams competing in the 2013–14 Segunda Liga	
Second round (16 teams)	6 teams ranked 9th–14th in the 2012–13 Primeira Liga; 2 teams promoted to the 2013–14 Primeira Liga	4 group winners from the first round; 4 group runners-up from the first round
Third round (16 teams)	8 teams ranked 1st–8th in the 2012–13 Primeira Liga	8 winners from the second round
Knockout phase (4 teams)		4 group winners from the third round

== Teams ==
The 33 teams competing in the two professional tiers of Portuguese football for the 2013–14 season are eligible to participate in this competition. For Primeira Liga teams, the final league position in the previous season determines if they enter in the second or third round of the Taça da Liga.

Third round (Primeira Liga)
Porto (1st)	Paços de Ferreira (3rd)	Estoril (5th)	Sporting CP (7th)
Benfica (2nd)	Braga (4th)	Rio Ave (6th)	Nacional (8th)
Second round (Primeira Liga)
Vitória de Guimarães (9th)	Académica (11th)	Gil Vicente (13th)	Belenenses (P1)
Marítimo (10th)	Vitória de Setúbal (12th)	Olhanense (14th)	Arouca (P1)
First round (Segunda Liga)
Leixões (3rd)	Tondela (10th)	Atlético CP (17th)	Moreirense (R2)
Desportivo das Aves (5th)	Santa Clara (11th)	Trofense (19th)	Desportivo de Chaves (P2)
Portimonense(6th)	União da Madeira (12th)	Sporting da Covilhã (20th)	Farense (P2)
Oliveirense (8th)	Feirense (13th)	Beira-Mar (R1)	Académico de Viseu (P2)
Penafiel (9th)			

Key

- Nth: League position in the 2012–13 season
- P1: Promoted to the Primeira Liga
- P2: Promoted to the Segunda Liga
- R1: Relegated to the Segunda Liga

Notes

- Sporting da Covilhã finished 20th in the 2012–13 Segunda Liga, in position to be relegated to the National Championship for the 2013–14 season. However, as Naval – which finished 18th in the Segunda Liga – were unable to fulfill the LPFP requirements mandatory for entry in professional competitions, they were further relegated to the National Championship and Covilhã was invited to take Naval's place.

== Schedule ==
All draws were held at the LPFP headquarters in Porto.

Round		Draw date	Match date(s)	Teams	Fixtures
First round	Matchday 1	4 July 2013	27 July 2013	33 → 24	28
First round	Matchday 2	4 July 2013	31 July 2013	33 → 24	28
First round	Matchday 3	4 July 2013	4 August 2013	33 → 24	28
First round	Matchday 4	4 July 2013	7 August 2013	33 → 24	28
First round	Matchday 5	4 July 2013	14 August 2013	33 → 24	28
Second round		10 September 2013	25–26 September 2013 (1st leg); 30–31 October 2013 (2nd leg)	24 → 16	16
Third round	Matchday 1	20 November 2013	29–30 December 2013	16 → 4	24
Third round	Matchday 2	20 November 2013	14–16 January 2014	16 → 4	24
Third round	Matchday 3	20 November 2013	25–26 January 2014	16 → 4	24
Knockout phase	Semi-finals	20 November 2013	12 February–27 April 2014	4 → 2	3
Knockout phase	Final	20 November 2013	7 May 2014	2 → 1	3

Source: LPFP

== First round ==
=== Group A ===
Pos	Team	Pld	W	D	L	GF	GA	GD	Pts	Qualification	PRM	BEM	TRO	UDM
1	Portimonense	3	2	1	0	3	0	+3	7	Advance to second round		1–0	2–0	
2	Beira-Mar	3	1	1	1	4	3	+1	4	Advance to second round				2–2
3	Trofense	3	1	0	2	2	4	−2	3			0–2		2–0
4	União da Madeira	3	0	2	1	2	4	−2	2		0–0			

=== Group B ===
Pos	Team	Pld	W	D	L	GF	GA	GD	Pts	Qualification	STC	FAR	AVE	TON
1	Santa Clara	3	2	0	1	3	2	+1	6	Advance to second round				2–1
2	Farense	3	1	1	1	3	3	0	4	Advance to second round	1–0		0–1	
3	Desportivo das Aves	3	1	1	1	2	2	0	4		0–1			
4	Tondela	3	0	2	1	4	5	−1	2			2–2	1–1	

=== Group C ===
Pos	Team	Pld	W	D	L	GF	GA	GD	Pts	Qualification	PEN	LEI	ACV	ATL
1	Penafiel	3	3	0	0	4	0	+4	9	Advance to second round		2–0	1–0	
2	Leixões	3	2	0	1	5	5	0	6	Advance to second round				3–2
3	Académico de Viseu	3	1	0	2	2	3	−1	3			1–2		1–0
4	Atlético CP	3	0	0	3	2	5	−3	0		0–1			

=== Group D ===
Pos	Team	Pld	W	D	L	GF	GA	GD	Pts	Qualification	MOR	SCO	CHA	FEI	OLI
1	Moreirense	4	2	1	1	6	2	+4	7	Advance to second round			2–1		4–0
2	Sporting Covilhã	4	2	1	1	5	6	−1	7	Advance to second round	1–0				1–1
3	Desportivo de Chaves	4	2	0	2	7	5	+2	6			1–2		3–1	
4	Feirense	4	1	1	2	6	6	0	4		0–0	4–1			
5	Oliveirense	4	1	1	2	3	8	−5	4				0–2	2–1	

== Second round ==
The draw for the second round was held on 10 September 2013. The sixteen teams involved in this draw were divided in two pots: one pot contained the eight teams progressing from the first round, and the other pot included the six teams that finished 9th–14th in the 2012–13 Primeira Liga and the two teams promoted to the top flight from the 2012–13 Segunda Liga. The first-leg matches were played on 25 September, 9 and 12–13 October 2013. The second-leg matches were played on 13 and 30 October, and 16–17 November 2013.

Team 1	Agg.	Team 2	1st leg	2nd leg
Santa Clara	0–1	Belenenses	0–0	0–1
Portimonense	2–3	Vitória de Setúbal	2–2	0–1
Moreirense	3–4	Gil Vicente	0–0	3–4
Leixões	4–2	Vitória de Guimarães	2–1	2–1
Sporting da Covilhã	3–2	Olhanense	1–0	2–2
Beira-Mar	2–2 (5–4 p)	Arouca	0–1	2–1
Penafiel	2–1	Académica de Coimbra	2–1	0–0
Farense	0–2	Marítimo	0–2	0–0

== Third round ==
The draw for the third round was held on 20 November 2013. The sixteen teams taking part in this draw were divided in four pots: the first pot contained the teams placed 1st–4th in the 2012–13 Primeira Liga, while the second pot had the teams placed 5th–8th. The third pot included the four second-round winners with the best placing in their respective leagues in the 2012–13 season, and the fourth pot had the remaining second-round winners. Each group contained four teams, one from each pot, and was contested in a single round-robin format, with each team playing at least one match at home. The matches took place on 29–30 December 2013, 14–16 and 25–26 January 2014. The group winners advanced to the semi-finals.

Tiebreakers

The teams are ranked according to points (3 points for a win, 1 point for a tie, 0 points for a loss). If two or more teams are equal on points on completion of the group matches, the following criteria are applied to determine the rankings:

1. superior goal difference from all group matches played;
2. higher number of goals scored from all group matches played;
3. lowest average team age in all group matches played. The average team age is determined by dividing the sum of the complete age years of all players fielded in all group matches by the total number of players fielded in all group matches.

=== Group A ===
Pos	Team	Pld	W	D	L	GF	GA	GD	Pts	Qualification
1	Rio Ave	3	2	1	0	6	2	+4	7	Advance to knockout phase
2	Paços de Ferreira	3	2	0	1	4	3	+1	6	
3	Vitória de Setúbal	3	1	1	1	2	3	−1	4	
4	Sporting da Covilhã	3	0	0	3	2	6	−4	0	

29 December 2013
16:00

Rio Ave	2–0	Paços de Ferreira
Hassan 36'; Ukra 89' (pen.)	Report

Estádio dos Arcos, Vila do Conde
Attendance: 1,326
Referee: João Capela
8 January 2014
16:00

Vitória de Setúbal	1–0	Sporting da Covilhã
Venâncio 90+4'	Report

Estádio do Bonfim, Setúbal
Attendance: 574
Referee: Nuno Almeida

15 January 2014
16:00

Paços de Ferreira	2–1	Sporting da Covilhã
Del Valle 18'; Buval 67'	Report	Kizito 90+1'

Capital do Móvel, Paços de Ferreira
Attendance: 671
Referee: Bruno Paixão
15 January 2014
18:30

Rio Ave	1–1	Vitória de Setúbal
Joeano 84'	Report	Pedroso 23'

Estádio dos Arcos, Vila do Conde
Attendance: 687
Referee: Rui Costa

26 January 2013
15:00

Paços de Ferreira	2–0	Vitória de Setúbal
Buval 11'; Oliveira 90+2'	Report

Capital do Móvel, Paços de Ferreira
Attendance: 1,233
Referee: Olegário Benquerença
26 January 2013
15:00

Sporting da Covilhã	1–3	Rio Ave
Forbes 50' (pen.)	Report	Braga 24'; Ukra 42'; Pedro Santos 62'

Complexo Desportivo da Covilhã, Covilhã
Attendance: 447
Referee: Cosme Machado

=== Group B ===
Pos	Team	Pld	W	D	L	GF	GA	GD	Pts	Qualification
1	Porto	3	2	1	0	7	2	+5	7	Advance to knockout phase
2	Sporting CP	3	2	1	0	6	1	+5	7	
3	Marítimo	3	0	1	2	2	6	−4	1	
4	Penafiel	3	0	1	2	1	7	−6	1	

29 December 2013
16:00

Marítimo	0–0	Penafiel
	Report

Estádio dos Barreiros, Funchal, Madeira
Attendance: 832
Referee: Cosme Machado
29 December 2013
20:45

Sporting CP	0–0	Porto
	Report

Estádio José Alvalade, Lisbon
Attendance: 21,505
Referee: Olegário Benquerença

14 January 2014
19:45

Sporting CP	3–0	Marítimo
Mané 19'; Vítor 50'; Rojo 84'	Report

Estádio José Alvalade, Lisbon
Attendance: 11,321
Referee: Nuno Almeida
15 January 2014
18:30

Porto	4–0	Penafiel
Quaresma 11'; Martínez 63', 76'; Varela 78'	Report

Estádio do Dragão, Porto
Attendance: 12,507
Referee: Duarte Gomes

25 January 2013
20:45

Porto	3–2	Marítimo
Martínez 20'; Carlos Eduardo 85'; Josué 90+6' (pen.)	Report	João Diogo 22'; Artur 34'

Estádio do Dragão, Porto
Attendance: 20,109
Referee: Manuel Mota
25 January 2013
20:45

Penafiel	1–3	Sporting CP
Aldair 19'	Report	Mané 44'; Eduardo 68'; Silva 82' (pen.)

Estádio Municipal 25 de Abril, Penafiel
Attendance: 2,147
Referee: Marco Ferreira

=== Group C ===
Pos	Team	Pld	W	D	L	GF	GA	GD	Pts	Qualification
1	Braga	3	3	0	0	10	1	+9	9	Advance to knockout phase
2	Estoril	3	1	1	1	5	4	+1	4	
3	Belenenses	3	1	1	1	2	6	−4	4	
4	Beira-Mar	3	0	0	3	1	7	−6	0	

29 December 2013
18:00

Estoril	1–2	Braga
Carlitos 18'	Report	Sasso 13'; Silva 54'

Estádio António Coimbra da Mota, Estoril
Attendance: 1,517
Referee: Vasco Santos
30 December 2013
18:00

Belenenses	1–0	Beira-Mar
Danielsson 73'	Report

Estádio do Restelo, Lisbon
Attendance: 531
Referee: Jorge Tavares

15 January 2014
16:00

Braga	3–0	Beira-Mar
Pardo 12'; Rusescu 75'; Edinho 90+2'	Report

Estádio AXA, Braga
Attendance: 3,388
Referee: Hugo Pacheco
16 January 2014
17:00

Estoril	1–1	Belenenses
Tavares 35'	Report	Kay 57'

Estádio António Coimbra da Mota, Estoril
Attendance: 1,047
Referee: Hugo Miguel

25 January 2013
16:00

Braga	5–0	Belenenses
Alan 4' (pen.), 71'; Silva 41'; Luíz Carlos 42'; Rusescu 82'	Report

Estádio AXA, Braga
Attendance: 6,720
Referee: Duarte Gomes
25 January 2013
16:00

Beira-Mar	1–3	Estoril
Cintra 24'	Report	João Pedro 26'; Balboa 63'; Borges 82'

Estádio Municipal de Aveiro, Aveiro
Attendance: 257
Referee: Jorge Sousa

=== Group D ===
Pos	Team	Pld	W	D	L	GF	GA	GD	Pts	Qualification
1	Benfica	3	3	0	0	4	0	+4	9	Advance to knockout phase
2	Nacional	3	1	1	1	4	3	+1	4	
3	Gil Vicente	3	0	2	1	2	4	−2	2	
4	Leixões	3	0	1	2	0	4	−4	1	

30 December 2013
20:45

Nacional	0–1	Benfica
	Report	Mexer 32' (o.g.)

Estádio da Madeira, Funchal, Madeira
Attendance: 3,427
Referee: Carlos Xistra
8 January 2014
19:00

Gil Vicente	0–0	Leixões
	Report

Estádio Cidade de Barcelos, Barcelos
Attendance: 923
Referee: Artur Soares Dias

15 January 2014
16:00

Nacional	2–2	Gil Vicente
Djaniny 42'; Reginaldo 61'	Report	Danielson 47', 75'

Estádio da Madeira, Funchal, Madeira
Attendance: 427
Referee: João Capela
15 January 2014
20:45

Benfica	2–0	Leixões
Đuričić 27'; Cavaleiro 87'	Report

Estádio da Luz, Lisbon
Attendance: 9,524
Referee: Manuel Oliveira

25 January 2014
16:00

Benfica	1–0	Gil Vicente
Sulejmani 56'	Report

Estádio do Restelo, Lisbon (Note: The match between Benfica and Gil Vicente was scheduled to be played at the Estádio da Luz, but due to Benfica's ground undergoing resurfacing work, the match venue was changed to the Estádio do Restelo.)
Attendance: 6,664
Referee: Bruno Esteves
26 January 2014
15:00

Leixões	0–2	Nacional
	Report	João 50'; Aurélio 52'

Estádio do Mar, Matosinhos
Attendance: 750
Referee: Pedro Proença

== Knockout phase ==
In the knockout phase, the four third-round group winners will contest a one-legged semi-final match for a place in the competition final.

Semi-finals
27 April – Estádio do Dragão
Porto	0 (3)
Benfica (p)	0 (4)
13 February – Estádio dos Arcos
Rio Ave	2
Braga	1

Final
7 May – Estádio Dr. Magalhães Pessoa
Benfica	2
Rio Ave	0

=== Semi-finals ===
The semi-final pairings were made during the draw for the third round, on 20 November 2013. Matches took place on 13 February and 27 April 2014.

27 April 2014 (Note: Match originally scheduled for 12 February but postponed due to the disciplinary investigation conducted against Porto regarding the delayed start of Porto's final match against Marítimo in the third round.)
18:15

Porto	0–0	Benfica
	Report
Penalties
Quintero (penalty scored); Martínez (penalty missed); Ghilas (penalty scored); Maicon (penalty missed); Varela (penalty scored); Fernando (penalty missed)	3–4	(penalty scored) Siqueira; (penalty missed) Garay; (penalty scored) Jardel; (penalty missed) Gomes; (penalty scored) Pérez; (penalty scored) Cavaleiro

Estádio do Dragão, Porto
Attendance: 26,104
Referee: Marco Ferreira

13 February 2014
19:45

Rio Ave	2–1	Braga
Hassan 41' (pen.); Braga 69'	Report	Custódio 45+1'

Estádio dos Arcos, Vila do Conde
Attendance: 1,813
Referee: Olegário Benquerença

=== Final ===
7 May 2014
20:30

Benfica	2–0	Rio Ave
Rodrigo 42'; Luisão 78'	Report

Estádio Dr. Magalhães Pessoa, Leiria
Attendance: 23,119
Referee: Hugo Miguel

== Statistics ==
=== Top goalscorers ===
Rank	Player	Club	Goals	Games	Minutes per goal
1	(Colombia) Jackson Martínez	Porto	3	3	46
2	(Portugal) Tozé Marreco	Tondela	3	3	90
3	(Brazil) Wágner	Moreirense	3	5	110
4	(Portugal) Ricardo Pessoa	Portimonense	3	5	150
5	(Portugal) Hugo Moreira	Leixões	3	7	157
6	(Brazil) Nildo Petrolina	Beira-Mar	2	1	45
7	(Portugal) Paulo Tavares	Vitória de Setúbal	2	2	61
8	(Portugal) Carlos Mané	Sporting CP	2	2	74
9	(Romania) Raul Rusescu	Braga	2	2	90
10	(Portugal) Ricardo Chaves	Chaves	2	2	90

Last update: 26 January 2014
