= 2018–19 Valencia CF season =

99th season in existence of Valencia CF

Valencia CF
2018–19 season
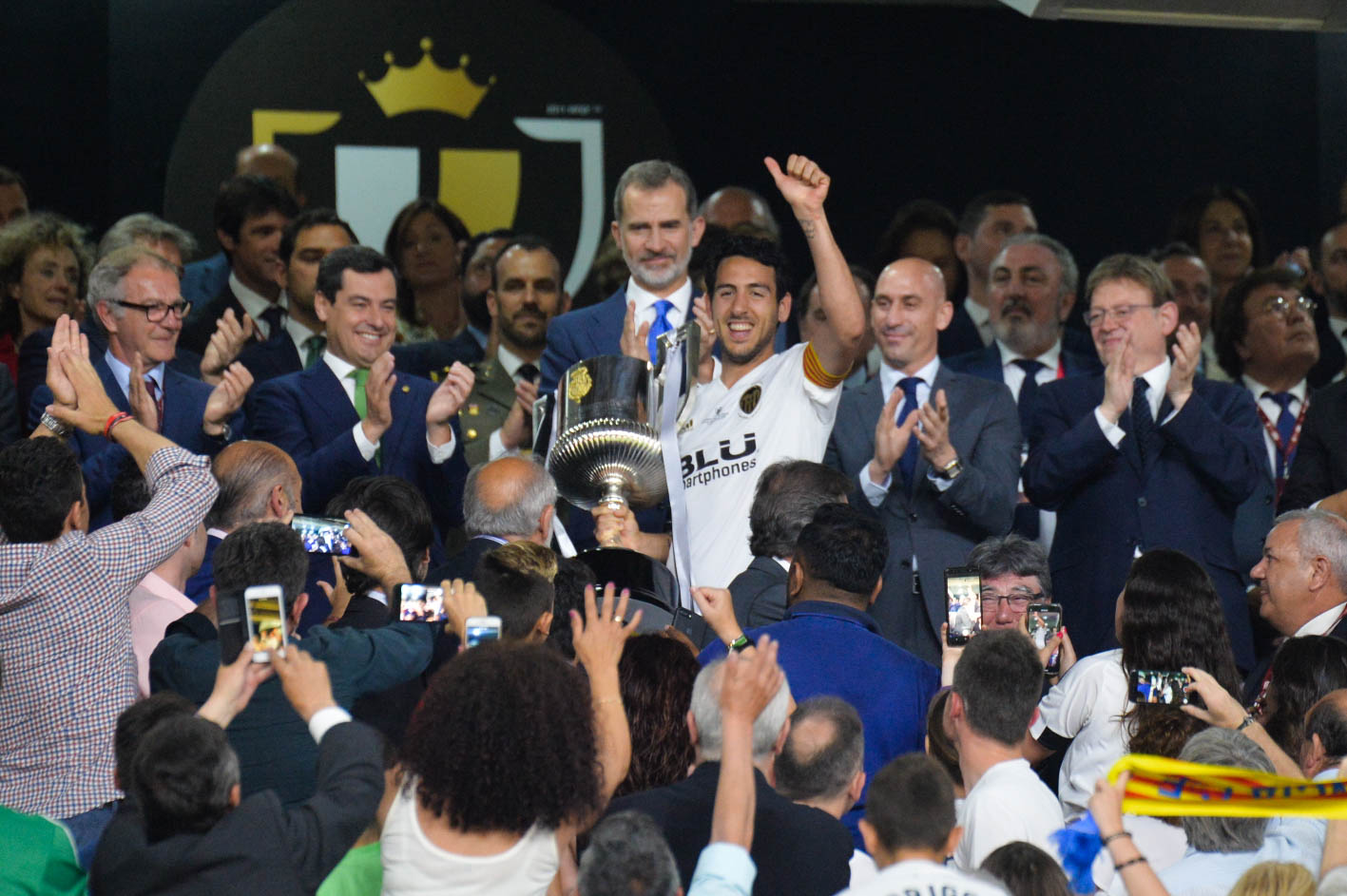
- Dani Parejo receives the trophy following Valencia's final victory
- Owner: Peter Lim
- President: Anil Murthy
- Head coach: Marcelino
- Stadium: Mestalla
- La Liga: 4th
- Copa del Rey: Winners
- UEFA Champions League: Group stage
- UEFA Europa League: Semi-final
- Top goalscorer: League: Dani Parejo (9); All: Rodrigo (15)
Home colours	Away colours	Third colours

The 2018–19 Valencia CF season was the club's 99th in its history and 84th in La Liga. Valencia qualified for the UEFA Champions League for the first time since 2015–16, entering and being eliminated at the group stage. Valencia competed at the UEFA Europa League, entering at the round of 32 and eliminated at the semi-finals. Valencia competed and won the Copa del Rey achieving its 8th title overall, and the first since 2008 after entering at the round of 32.

== Players ==
=== First-team squad ===
As of 27 January 2019

Note: Flags indicate national team as defined under FIFA eligibility rules; some limited exceptions apply. Players may hold more than one non-FIFA nationality.

No.	Pos.	Nation	Player
1	GK	ESP	Jaume Domènech
4	DF	ARG	Facundo Roncaglia (on loan from Celta Vigo)
5	DF	BRA	Gabriel
6	MF	CAF	Geoffrey Kondogbia
7	MF	POR	Gonçalo Guedes
8	MF	ESP	Carlos Soler
9	FW	FRA	Kevin Gameiro
10	MF	ESP	Dani Parejo (captain)
11	MF	RUS	Denis Cheryshev (on loan from Villarreal)
12	DF	FRA	Mouctar Diakhaby
13	GK	BRA	Neto

No.	Pos.	Nation	Player
14	DF	ESP	José Gayà
15	DF	ESP	Toni Lato
16	MF	KOR	Lee Kang-in
17	MF	FRA	Francis Coquelin
18	MF	DEN	Daniel Wass
19	FW	ESP	Rodrigo
20	MF	ESP	Ferran Torres
21	DF	ITA	Cristiano Piccini
22	FW	ESP	Santi Mina
23	FW	ESP	Rubén Sobrino
24	DF	ARG	Ezequiel Garay

=== Out on loan ===
Note: Flags indicate national team as defined under FIFA eligibility rules; some limited exceptions apply. Players may hold more than one non-FIFA nationality.

No.	Pos.	Nation	Player
3	DF	POR	Rúben Vezo (at Levante until 30 June 2019)
4	DF	COL	Jeison Murillo (at Barcelona until 30 June 2019)
—	DF	TUN	Aymen Abdennour (at Marseille until 30 June 2019)
—	DF	BRA	Aderlan Santos (at Vitória until 31 December 2018)
—	MF	ESP	Nacho Gil (at Elche until 30 June 2019)

No.	Pos.	Nation	Player
—	MF	ESP	Álvaro Medrán (at Rayo Vallecano until 30 June 2019)
—	MF	ESP	Fran Villalba (at Numancia until 30 June 2019)
—	FW	ITA	Simone Zaza (at Torino until 30 June 2019)
—	MF	SRB	Uroš Račić (at Tenerife until 30 June 2019)

== Transfers ==
=== In ===
No.	Pos.	Nat.	Name	Age	EU	Moving from	Type	Transfer window	Ends	Transfer fee	Source
4	DF	(Colombia)	Jeison Murillo	26	Non-EU	(Italy) Internazionale	Transfer	Summer	2019	€12,000,000	ElDesmarque
6	MF	(France)	Geoffrey Kondogbia	25	EU	(Italy) Internazionale	Transfer	Summer	2022	€25,000,000	Valencia
7	FW	(Portugal)	Gonçalo Guedes	21	EU	(France) Paris Saint-Germain	Transfer	Summer	2023	€40,000,000	Valencia
12	DF	(France)	Mouctar Diakhaby	21	EU	(France) Lyon	Transfer	Summer	2022	€15,000,000	Valencia
18	MF	(Denmark)	Daniel Wass	29	EU	Celta Vigo	Transfer	Summer	2022	€6,000,000	Valencia
21	DF	(Italy)	Cristiano Piccini	25	EU	(Portugal) Sporting CP	Transfer	Summer	2022	€7,000,000	Valencia
23	FW	(Belgium)	Michy Batshuayi	24	EU	(England) Chelsea	Loan	Summer	2019	€3,000,000	Valencia
26	MF	(Serbia)	Uroš Račić	20	Non-EU	(Serbia) Red Star Belgrade	Transfer	Summer	2022	€2,200,000	Valencia
31	MF	(Spain)	Nacho Gil	22	EU	Las Palmas	Loan return	Summer		Free	
	DF	(Portugal)	João Cancelo	24	EU	(Italy) Internazionale	Loan return	Summer		Free	
	MF	(Spain)	Álvaro Medrán	24	EU	Alavés	Loan return	Summer	2020	Free	
	MF	(Chile)	Fabián Orellana	32	Non-EU	Eibar	Loan return	Summer		Free	
	MF	(Portugal)	Nani	31	EU	(Italy) Lazio	Loan return	Summer		Free	
	MF	(Belgium)	Zakaria Bakkali	22	EU	Deportivo La Coruña	Loan return	Summer		Free	
11	MF	(Russia)	Denis Cheryshev	27	EU	Villarreal	Loan	Summer	2019	Free	Valencia
9	FW	(France)	Kevin Gameiro	31	EU	Atlético Madrid	Transfer	Summer	2021	€16,000,000	Valencia
23	FW	(Spain)	Rubén Sobrino	26	EU	Deportivo Alavés	Transfer	Winter	2021	UD	Valencia
4	DF	(Argentina)	Facundo Roncaglia	31	EU	RC Celta de Vigo	Season loan	Winter	2019	UD	Valencia

▼ Total Spending: €126,200,000

=== Out ===
No.	Pos.	Nat.	Name	Age	EU	Moving to	Type	Transfer window	Transfer fee	Source
6	MF	(Serbia)	Nemanja Maksimović	23	Non-EU	Getafe	Transfer	Summer	€10,000,000^{**}	Getafe
7	MF	(Portugal)	Gonçalo Guedes	21	EU	(France) Paris Saint-Germain	Loan return	Summer	Free	
8	MF	(Argentina)	Luciano Vietto	24	EU	Atlético Madrid	Loan return	Summer	Free	
9	FW	(Italy)	Simone Zaza	27	EU	(Italy) Torino	Loan	Summer	€2,000,000	Valencia
11	MF	(Brazil)	Andreas Pereira	22	EU	(England) Manchester United	Loan return	Summer	Free	
16	MF	(Spain)	Nacho Gil	23	EU	Elche	Loan	Summer	Free	Valencia
21	DF	(Spain)	Martín Montoya	27	EU	(England) Brighton & Hove Albion	Transfer	Summer	€7,000,000	Brighton
23	MF	(Spain)	Álvaro Medrán	24	EU	Rayo Vallecano	Loan	Summer	Free	Valencia
30	DF	(Spain)	Nacho Vidal	23	EU	Osasuna	Transfer	Summer	Free	Osasuna
	DF	(Portugal)	João Cancelo	24	EU	(Italy) Juventus	Transfer	Summer	€40,400,000	Juventus
	MF	(Chile)	Fabián Orellana	32	Non-EU	Eibar	Transfer	Summer	€2,000,000	Eibar
	MF	(Portugal)	Nani	31	EU	(Portugal) Sporting CP	Transfer	Summer	Free	Sporting
	MF	(Belgium)	Zakaria Bakkali	22	EU	(Belgium) Anderlecht	Transfer	Summer	€1,500,000	Anderlecht
4	DF	(Colombia)	Jeison Murillo	26	EU	FC Barcelona	Loan	Winter	€1,200,000	FCBarcelona.com
3	DF	(Portugal)	Rúben Vezo	24	EU	Levante UD	Loan	Winter	UD	
23	FW	(Belgium)	Michy Batshuayi	25	EU	(England) Chelsea FC	Loan Return	Winter	UD	

▲ Total Income: €62,900,000^{**}

Net Income: ▼€63,300,000

^{**}Valencia originally received €5,000,000 for Maksimović on 16 July 2018, with the club retaining a buy-back option for 3 years. At the end of the season, Getafe paid Valencia an additional €5,000,000 to retain the player, with Valencia rescinding their buy-back rights and instead receiving 30% of any future transfer.

== Club ==
=== Kits ===
Supplier: Adidas / Sponsor: BLU Products

Home	Home alt.	Away	Away alt.

=== Kit information ===
Adidas supplied their last kit for Valencia this season, which saw an end to 5 years of contract. Puma became the club's new kit supplier starting in July 2019.

== Competitions ==
=== Overall ===
Competition	First match	Last match	Starting round	Final position	Record							
Competition	First match	Last match	Starting round	Final position	Pld	W	D	L	GF	GA	GD	Win %
La Liga	20 August 2018	19 May 2019	Matchday 1	4th	38	15	16	7	51	35	+16	39.47
Copa del Rey	30 October 2018	25 May 2019	Round of 32	Winners	9	6	1	2	15	8	+7	66.67
Champions League	19 September 2018	12 December 2018	Group stage	Group stage	6	2	2	2	6	6	+0	33.33
Europa League	14 February 2019	9 May 2019	Round of 32	Semi-finals	8	5	1	2	14	10	+4	62.50
Total					61	28	20	13	86	59	+27	45.90

Last updated: 25 May 2019
Source: Competitions

=== La Liga ===
Valencia made a very poor start to the season with five draws and a loss in their first six matches, leaving them perilously close to the relegation places. After beating Real Sociedad, they were winless again for a further four games before beating Getafe, and at the mid-point of the season they had only amassed 23 points. Thereafter, they made a remarkable comeback, going 12 consecutive matches undefeated to put themselves in contention for a place in the Champions League. They clinched fourth place with a victory over Real Valladolid on the last day of the season.

==== League table ====
Pos	Team	Pld	W	D	L	GF	GA	GD	Pts	Qualification or relegation
2	Atlético Madrid	38	22	10	6	55	29	+26	76	Qualification for the Champions League group stage
3	Real Madrid	38	21	5	12	63	46	+17	68	Qualification for the Champions League group stage
4	Valencia	38	15	16	7	51	35	+16	61	Qualification for the Champions League group stage
5	Getafe	38	15	14	9	48	35	+13	59 (Note: Getafe finished ahead of Sevilla on head-to-head points: Sevilla 0–2 Getafe, Getafe 3–0 Sevilla.)	Qualification for the Europa League group stage (Note: Since the winners of the 2018–19 Copa del Rey, Valencia, qualified for European competition based on league position, the spot awarded to the cup winners (Europa League group stage) was passed to the sixth-placed team and the spot awarded to the sixth-placed team (Europa League second qualifying round) was passed to the seventh-placed team.)
6	Sevilla	38	17	8	13	62	47	+15	59	Qualification for the Europa League group stage

Source: La Liga, Soccerway
Rules for classification: 1) Points; 2) Head-to-head points; 3) Head-to-head goal difference; 4) Goal difference; 5) Goals scored; 6) Fair-play points (Note: Head-to-head record is used only after all the matches between the teams in question have been played)

==== Results summary ====
Overall								Home						Away					
Pld	W	D	L	GF	GA	GD	Pts	W	D	L	GF	GA	GD	W	D	L	GF	GA	GD
38	15	16	7	51	35	+16	61	7	10	2	24	12	+12	8	6	5	27	23	+4

Last updated: 18 May 2019.
Source: Competitive matches

==== Result round by round ====
Round	1	2	3	4	5	6	7	8	9	10	11	12	13	14	15	16	17	18	19	20	21	22	23	24	25	26	27	28	29	30	31	32	33	34	35	36	37	38
Ground	H	A	A	H	A	H	A	H	H	A	H	A	H	A	H	A	H	A	H	A	H	A	H	H	A	H	A	H	A	H	A	H	A	A	H	A	H	A
Result	D	L	D	D	D	D	W	D	D	D	L	W	W	L	D	D	W	L	D	W	W	D	D	D	D	W	W	D	W	W	L	W	W	L	L	W	W	W
Position	11	15	17	17	15	15	13	14	14	14	15	15	11	14	15	14	8	12	11	9	7	8	8	9	9	7	7	7	6	5	6	6	5	6	6	5	4	4

Updated to match(es) played on 18 May 2019. Source:
A = Away; H = Home; W = Win; D = Draw; L = Loss

==== Matches ====
Win Draw Loss Fixtures

20 August 2018 1	Valencia	1–1	Atlético Madrid	Valencia
20:00 CEST (UTC+02:00)	Garay (yellow card) 45'; Rodrigo 56', (yellow card) 70'	Report	Savić (yellow card) 13'; Correa 26'; Juanfran (yellow card) 52'; Filipe Luís (yellow card) 63'	Stadium: Mestalla; Attendance: 46,174; Referee: Jesús Gil Manzano

26 August 2018 2	Espanyol	2–0	Valencia	Cornellà
18:15 CEST (UTC+02:00)	Hermoso (yellow card) 48'; Granero 62'; Iglesias 68'	Report	Diakhaby (yellow card) 30'	Stadium: RCDE Stadium; Attendance: 18,714; Referee: Carlos del Cerro Grande

2 September 2018 3	Levante	2–2	Valencia	Valencia
12:00 CEST (UTC+02:00)	Roger 13', 33'; Coke (yellow card) 45' (yellow-red card) 76'; Chema (yellow card) 48'; Morales (yellow card) 90+4'	Report	Cheryshev 16'; Parejo 52' (pen.); Torres (yellow card) 90+3'; Mina (yellow card) 90+4'	Stadium: Ciutat de València; Attendance: 22,550; Referee: Xavier Estrada Fernández

15 September 2018 4	Valencia	0–0	Real Betis	Valencia
18:30 CEST (UTC+02:00)	Torres (yellow card) 16'; Parejo (yellow card) 31'; Piccini (yellow card) 62'; Gabriel (yellow card) 74'; Diakhaby (yellow card) 76'; Batshuayi (yellow card) 90+2'	Report	Sanabria (yellow card) 36'; Guardado (yellow card) 77'; López (yellow card) 81'	Stadium: Mestalla; Attendance: 40,050; Referee: Alejandro Hernández Hernández

23 September 2018 5	Villarreal	0–0	Valencia	Villarreal
16:15 CEST (UTC+02:00)	Costa (yellow card) 38'; Layún (yellow card) 63'; Funes Mori (yellow card) 84'; Mario Gaspar (yellow card) 90'	Report	Diakhaby (yellow card) 22'; Parejo (red card) 58'	Stadium: La Cerámica; Attendance: 18,373; Referee: Santiago Jaime Latre

26 September 2018 6	Valencia	1–1	Celta Vigo	Valencia
22:00 CEST (UTC+02:00)	Batshuayi 25', (yellow card) 56'	Report	Aspas (yellow card) 45', (goal) 82'; Mallo (yellow card) 48'; Beltrán (yellow card) 75'	Stadium: Mestalla; Attendance: 35,495; Referee: Ricardo de Burgos Bengoetxea

29 September 2018 7	Real Sociedad	0–1	Valencia	San Sebastián
13:00 CEST (UTC+02:00)	Zubeldia (yellow card) 63'; Elustondo (yellow card) 80'; Sandro (yellow card) 90+4'	Report	Lato (yellow card) 9'; Gameiro 36'; Cheryshev (yellow card) 45'; Gabriel (yellow card) 70'; Neto (yellow card) 90+2'; Vezo (yellow card) 90+4'	Stadium: Anoeta; Attendance: 23,577; Referee: Jesús Gil Manzano

7 October 2018 8	Valencia	1–1	Barcelona	Valencia
20:45 CEST (UTC+02:00)	Garay 2'; Soler (yellow card) 43'; Parejo (yellow card) 58'	Report	Messi 23'; Suárez (yellow card) 41'; Coutinho (yellow card) 58'	Stadium: Mestalla; Attendance: 46,249; Referee: José Luis González González

20 October 2018 9	Valencia	1–1	Leganés	Valencia
16:15 CEST (UTC+02:00)	Gayà 85'; Parejo (yellow card) 90+3'	Report	Óscar (yellow card) 33'; Gumbau (yellow card) 48', (goal) 63' (pen.)	Stadium: Mestalla; Attendance: 35,597; Referee: Ignacio Iglesias Villanueva

27 October 2018 10	Athletic Bilbao	0–0	Valencia	Bilbao
16:15 CEST (UTC+02:00)	Capa (yellow card) 20'; Berchiche (yellow card) 77'	Report	Vezo (yellow card) 16'; Soler (yellow card) 35'; Batshuayi (yellow card) 38'; Wass (yellow card) 74'; Gayà (yellow card) 90+2'	Stadium: San Mamés; Attendance: 39,261; Referee: Alberto Undiano Mallenco

3 November 2018 11	Valencia	0–1	Girona	Valencia
18:30 CET (UTC+01:00)	Gayà (yellow card) 28'; Coquelin (yellow card) 36'; Gabriel (yellow card) 77'; Kondogbia (yellow card) 79'	Report	Doumbia (yellow card) 30'; Muniesa (yellow card) 39'; Planas (yellow card) 40'; Pons 48'; Bounou (yellow card) 59'	Stadium: Mestalla; Attendance: 38,745; Referee: Javier Alberola Rojas

11 November 2018 12	Getafe	0–1	Valencia	Getafe
16:15 CET (UTC+01:00)	Antunes (yellow card) 30'; Bruno (yellow card) 75' (yellow-red card) 79'	Report	Gayà (yellow card) 54'; Coquelin (yellow card) 56'; Parejo 81' (pen.); Garay (yellow card) 90+3'	Stadium: Coliseum Alfonso Pérez; Attendance: 10,001; Referee: Ricardo de Burgos Bengoetxea

24 November 2018 13	Valencia	3–0	Rayo Vallecano	Valencia
16:15 CET (UTC+01:00)	Diakhaby (yellow card) 28'; Mina 35', 61'; Soler (yellow card) 74'; Gameiro 76'	Report	Advíncula (yellow card) 22' (yellow-red card) 87'; Comesaña (yellow card) 41'; Gálvez (yellow card) 51'	Stadium: Mestalla; Attendance: 37,814; Referee: Pablo González Fuertes

1 December 2018 14	Real Madrid	2–0	Valencia	Madrid
20:45 CET (UTC+01:00)	Wass 8' (o.g.); Ceballos (yellow card) 71'; Vázquez 83'	Report	Gabriel (yellow card) 6'; Soler (yellow card) 11'; Gayà (yellow card) 20'	Stadium: Santiago Bernabéu; Attendance: 69,653; Referee: José Luis González González

8 December 2018 15	Valencia	1–1	Sevilla	Valencia
16:15 CET (UTC+01:00)	Diakhaby 90+2'	Report	Vázquez (yellow card) 36'; Promes (yellow card) 37'; Mercado (yellow card) 45'; Sarabia 55'; Silva (yellow card) 90+1'	Stadium: Mestalla; Attendance: 40,057; Referee: Xavier Estrada Fernández

15 December 2018 16	Eibar	1–1	Valencia	Eibar
20:45 CET (UTC+01:00)	Charles 56' (pen.)	Report	Rodrigo 29', (yellow card) 78'	Stadium: Ipurua; Attendance: 4,491; Referee: Adrián Cordero Vega

23 December 2018 17	Valencia	2–1	Huesca	Valencia
12:00 CET (UTC+01:00)	Parejo 25'; Mina (yellow card) 31'; Cheryshev (yellow card) 34'; Garay (yellow card) 49'; Rodrigo (yellow card) 63'; Gayà (yellow card) 84'; Soler (yellow card) 87'; Piccini 90+4', (yellow card) 90+4'	Report	Insua (yellow card) 54'; Hernández 72' (pen.); Longo (yellow card) 82'; Rivera (yellow card) 84'; Etxeita (yellow card) 90+5'	Stadium: Mestalla; Attendance: 36,547; Referee: Jesús Gil Manzano

5 January 2019 18	Alavés	2–1	Valencia	Vitoria-Gasteiz
16:15 CET (UTC+01:00)	Laguardia (yellow card) 13'; Borja 21'; Navarro (yellow card) 25'; Pina 45+2'; Pacheco (yellow card) 82'	Report	Parejo 14'; Wass (yellow card) 22'; Diakhaby (yellow card) 46'; Torres (yellow card) 80'	Stadium: Mendizorrotza; Attendance: 18,304; Referee: David Medié Jiménez

12 January 2019 19	Valencia	1–1	Valladolid	Valencia
16:15 CET (UTC+01:00)	Parejo (yellow card) 64', (goal) 71'; Coquelin (yellow card) 81'	Report	Plano (yellow card) 13'; Nacho (yellow card) 20'; Ünal (yellow card) 37'; Alcaraz (yellow card) 67', (goal) 82'; Calero (yellow card) 76'	Stadium: Mestalla; Attendance: 36,912; Referee: Ignacio Iglesias Villanueva

19 January 2019 20	Celta Vigo	1–2	Valencia	Vigo
20:45 CET (UTC+01:00)	Jozabed (yellow card) 11'; Araujo 40'; Méndez (yellow card) 58'; Mallo (yellow card) 76'; Roncaglia (yellow card) 90+2'	Report	Soler (yellow card) 42'; Gabriel (yellow card) 42'; Torres 71', (yellow card) 80'; Rodrigo 84'	Stadium: Balaídos; Attendance: 15,668; Referee: José Luis González González

26 January 2019 21	Valencia	3–0	Villarreal	Valencia
18:30 CET (UTC+01:00)	Diakhaby 4'; Cheryshev 51'; Gayà (yellow card) 72'; Rodrigo 86'	Report	Ruiz (yellow card) 15'; Iborra (yellow card) 26'; Mario Gaspar (yellow card) 76'	Stadium: Mestalla; Attendance: 37,685; Referee: Carlos del Cerro Grande

2 February 2019 22	Barcelona	2–2	Valencia	Barcelona
18:30 CET (UTC+01:00)	Roberto (yellow card) 31'; Messi 39' (pen.), 64'; Rakitić (yellow card) 45'; Alba (yellow card) 90+1'	Report	Gameiro 24'; Parejo 32' (pen.)	Stadium: Camp Nou; Attendance: 76,789; Referee: Alberto Undiano Mallenco

10 February 2019 23	Valencia	0–0	Real Sociedad	Valencia
16:15 CET (UTC+01:00)	Mina (yellow card) 26'; Piccini (yellow card) 57'	Report	Hernandez (yellow card) 33'; Illarramendi (yellow card) 76'; Sandro (yellow card) 78'; Zaldúa (yellow card) 86'	Stadium: Mestalla; Attendance: 38,885; Referee: Mario Melero López

17 February 2019 24	Valencia	0–0	Espanyol	Valencia
16:15 CET (UTC+01:00)	Coquelin (yellow card) 66'; Roncaglia (yellow card) 84'	Report	López (yellow card) 28' (yellow-red card) 90+5'; Granero (yellow card) 75'; Roca (yellow card) 87'	Stadium: Mestalla; Attendance: 39,564; Referee: Ricardo de Burgos Bengoetxea

24 February 2019 25	Leganés	1–1	Valencia	Leganés
12:00 CET (UTC+01:00)	Kravets (yellow card) 21'; Óscar (yellow card) 69'; Bustinza (yellow card) 72'; Pérez (yellow card) 84'; Braithwaite 89'; En-Nesyri (yellow card) 90+4'	Report	Kondogbia 22'; Gayà (yellow card) 25'; Neto (yellow card) 68'; Gameiro (yellow card) 90'	Stadium: Municipal de Butarque; Attendance: 11,425; Referee: Xavier Estrada Fernández

3 March 2019 26	Valencia	2–0	Athletic Bilbao	Valencia
20:45 CET (UTC+01:00)	Rodrigo 49'; Gameiro 89'	Report	García (yellow card) 14'; Yeray (yellow card) 53'; Martínez (yellow card) 70'	Stadium: Mestalla; Attendance: 39,041; Referee: David Medié Jiménez

10 March 2019 27	Girona	2–3	Valencia	Girona
16:15 CET (UTC+01:00)	Ramalho 22'; Stuani 83' (pen.); Alcalá (yellow card) 88'	Report	Guedes 14'; Gayà (yellow card) 20'; Parejo 53'; Roncaglia (yellow card) 62' (yellow-red card) 72'; Diakhaby (yellow card) 82'; Torres 90'	Stadium: Montilivi; Attendance: 11,502; Referee: Carlos del Cerro Grande

17 March 2019 28	Valencia	0–0	Getafe	Valencia
18:30 CET (UTC+01:00)	Gayà (yellow card) 24'; Guedes (yellow card) 64'; Mina (yellow card) 85'	Report	Arambarri (yellow card) 26'; Cabrera (yellow card) 74'; Flamini (yellow card) 78'; Portillo (yellow card) 86'	Stadium: Mestalla; Attendance: 41,778; Referee: José María Sánchez Martínez

31 March 2019 29	Sevilla	0–1	Valencia	Seville
16:15 CEST (UTC+02:00)	Munir (yellow card) 58'; Vázquez (yellow card) 72'; Banega (yellow card) 90'	Report	Parejo 45' (pen.); Wass (yellow card) 90+2'	Stadium: Ramón Sánchez Pizjuán; Attendance: 38,450; Referee: José Luis González González

3 April 2019 30	Valencia	2–1	Real Madrid	Valencia
21:30 CEST (UTC+02:00)	Wass (yellow card) 5'; Guedes 35'; Parejo (yellow card) 65'; Garay 83'	Report	Odriozola (yellow card) 64'; Marcelo (yellow card) 76'; Benzema 90+3'	Stadium: Mestalla; Attendance: 44,274; Referee: Santiago Jaime Latre

6 April 2019 31	Rayo Vallecano	2–0	Valencia	Madrid
18:30 CEST (UTC+02:00)	De Tomás (yellow card) 14', (goal) 32'; Gálvez (yellow card) 55'; Suárez 90+1'	Report	Torres (yellow card) 29'; Roncaglia (yellow card) 76'; Diakhaby (yellow card) 84'	Stadium: Vallecas; Attendance: 11,320; Referee: Javier Alberola Rojas

14 April 2019 32	Valencia	3–1	Levante	Valencia
20:45 CEST (UTC+02:00)	Mina 2', 63'; Soler (yellow card) 33'; Guedes 57'; Lee (yellow card) 83'	Report	Soler 56' (o.g.); Mayoral (yellow card) 81'; Cabaco (yellow card) 89'	Stadium: Mestalla; Attendance: 42,220; Referee: Alberto Undiano Mallenco

21 April 2019 33	Real Betis	1–2	Valencia	Seville
20:45 CEST (UTC+02:00)	Guardado (yellow card) 45'; Junior (yellow card) 55'; Feddal (yellow card) 58'; Lo Celso (yellow card) 73', (goal) 78' (pen.)	Report	Guedes 45', 49'; Rodrigo (yellow card) 62' (yellow-red card) 82'	Stadium: Benito Villamarín; Attendance: 42,508; Referee: José María Sánchez Martínez

24 April 2019 34	Atlético Madrid	3–2	Valencia	Madrid
19:30 CEST (UTC+02:00)	Morata 9', (yellow card) 47'; Griezmann 49'; Filipe Luís (yellow card) 56'; Saúl (yellow card) 76'; Correa 81'	Report	Soler (yellow card) 22'; Gameiro 36'; Sobrino (yellow card) 73'; Parejo 77' (pen.); Diakhaby (yellow card) 90+2'	Stadium: Wanda Metropolitano; Attendance: 43,531; Referee: Alejandro Hernández Hernández

28 April 2019 35	Valencia	0–1	Eibar	Valencia
12:00 CEST (UTC+02:00)	Soler (yellow card) 58'; Roncaglia (yellow card) 60'	Report	José Ángel (yellow card) 70'; Charles (yellow card) 87', (goal) 90+3'; Álvarez (yellow card) 90+1'	Stadium: Mestalla; Attendance: 35,393; Referee: Xavier Estrada Fernández

5 May 2019 36	Huesca	2–6	Valencia	Huesca
20:45 CEST (UTC+02:00)	Ávila (yellow card) 30'; Melero 66'; Rivera (yellow card) 85'; Gallar 90+2' (pen.)	Report	Wass 2'; Rodrigo 16', 51'; Mina 20', 32'; Coquelin (yellow card) 29'; Etxeita 40' (o.g.)	Stadium: El Alcoraz; Attendance: 6,378; Referee: Carlos del Cerro Grande

12 May 2019 37	Valencia	3–1	Alavés	Valencia
18:30 CEST (UTC+02:00)	Soler 29'; Mina 34'; Garay (yellow card) 45'; Gabriel (yellow card) 64'; Gameiro 68'	Report	Navarro 12'; Brašanac (yellow card) 17'; Pina (yellow card) 35'; Borja (yellow card) 72'; Laguardia (yellow card) 89'; Twumasi (yellow card) 90+3'	Stadium: Mestalla; Attendance: 37,744; Referee: Guillermo Cuadra Fernández

18 May 2019 38	Valladolid	0–2	Valencia	Valladolid
16:15 CEST (UTC+02:00)	Fernández (yellow card) 26'	Report	Gayà (yellow card) 11'; Diakhaby (yellow card) 21'; Soler 36'; Guedes (yellow card) 41'; Rodrigo 52'	Stadium: José Zorrilla; Attendance: 23,455; Referee: Ricardo de Burgos Bengoetxea

=== Copa del Rey ===
Win Draw Loss Fixtures

==== Round of 32 ====
30 October 2018 First leg	Ebro	1–2	Valencia	Zaragoza
19:30 CET (UTC+01:00)	Portuga (yellow card) 19' (yellow-red card) 29'; Amelibia 62'	Report	Murillo (yellow card) 34'; Torres (yellow card) 52'; Mina 71', 80'; Lato (yellow card) 77'	Stadium: La Romareda; Attendance: 9,911; Referee: Xavier Estrada Fernández
Note: Ebro played their home match at La Romareda, the home stadium of Real Zaragoza, instead of their regular stadium La Almozara, in the same city, due to its low capacity.

4 December 2018 Second leg	Valencia	1–0 (3–1 agg.)	Ebro	Valencia
19:30 CET (UTC+01:00)	Batshuayi 59'	Report	Gerrit (yellow card) 84'	Stadium: Mestalla; Attendance: 23,272; Referee: Eduardo Prieto Iglesias

==== Round of 16 ====
8 January 2019 First leg	Sporting Gijón	2–1	Valencia	Gijón
21:30 CET (UTC+01:00)	Álvaro (yellow card) 32'; Noblejas 34'; Blackman 79'	Report	Vezo (yellow card) 36'; Gameiro 45'	Stadium: El Molinón; Attendance: 9,870; Referee: Alberto Undiano Mallenco

15 January 2019 Second leg	Valencia	3–0 (4–2 agg.)	Sporting Gijón	Valencia
21:30 CET (UTC+01:00)	Wass (yellow card) 21'; Diakhaby (yellow card) 41'; Coquelin (yellow card) 42'; Mina 65', 76'; Torres 90'	Report	Blackman (yellow card) 18'; Noblejas (yellow card) 51'; Đurđević (yellow card) 79'	Stadium: Mestalla; Attendance: 33,149; Referee: Xavier Estrada Fernández

==== Quarter-finals ====
22 January 2019 First leg	Getafe	1–0	Valencia	Getafe
21:30 CET (UTC+01:00)	Bruno (yellow card) 59'; Arambarri (yellow card) 63'; Mata (yellow card) 69'; Molina 77'	Report	Vezo (yellow card) 54'; Wass (yellow card) 65'; Doménech (yellow card) 69'; Cheryshev (yellow card) 73'; Lato (yellow card) 90'	Stadium: Coliseum Alfonso Pérez; Attendance: 7,021; Referee: Jesús Gil Manzano

29 January 2019 Second leg	Valencia	3–1 (3–2 agg.)	Getafe	Valencia
21:30 CET (UTC+01:00)	Gabriel (yellow card) 45'; Mina (yellow card) 46'; Rodrigo 61', 90+2', 90+3', (yellow card) 90+4'; Garay (yellow card) 68'; Diakhaby (red card) 90+10'	Report	Molina 1', (yellow card) 84'; Mata (yellow card) 10'; Suárez (yellow card) 20'; Djené (yellow card) 25' (yellow-red card) 74'; Portillo (yellow card) 43'; Chichizola (yellow card) 44'; Arambarri (yellow card) 90+7'	Stadium: Mestalla; Attendance: 34,140; Referee: Xavier Estrada Fernández

==== Semi-finals ====
7 February 2019 First leg	Real Betis	2–2	Valencia	Seville
21:00 CET (UTC+01:00)	Junior (yellow card) 15'; Loren 45'; Joaquín 54'	Report	Rodrigo (yellow card) 52'; Soler (yellow card) 65'; Cheryshev 70'; Parejo (yellow card) 73'; Gameiro 90+2'	Stadium: Benito Villamarín; Attendance: 57,123; Referee: Carlos del Cerro Grande

28 February 2019 Second leg	Valencia	1–0 (3–2 agg.)	Real Betis	Valencia
21:00 CET (UTC+01:00)	Gabriel (yellow card) 41'; Rodrigo 56'; Doménech (yellow card) 85'	Report	Joaquín (yellow card) 90+1'	Stadium: Mestalla; Attendance: 45,222; Referee: José Luis González González

==== Final ====
25 May 2019 Final	Barcelona	1–2	Valencia	Seville
21:00 CEST (UTC+02:00)	Busquets (yellow card) 61'; Messi 73'; Vidal (yellow card) 89'	Report	Gameiro 21'; Rodrigo 33'; Gayà (yellow card) 53'; Kondogbia (yellow card) 70'	Stadium: Benito Villamarín; Attendance: 53,698; Referee: Alberto Undiano Mallenco

=== UEFA Champions League ===
==== Group stage ====
Pos	Team	Pld	W	D	L	GF	GA	GD	Pts	Qualification	JUV	MUN	VAL	YB
1	(Italy) Juventus	6	4	0	2	9	4	+5	12	Advance to knockout phase	—	1–2	1–0	3–0
2	(England) Manchester United	6	3	1	2	7	4	+3	10	Advance to knockout phase	0–1	—	0–0	1–0
3	(Spain) Valencia	6	2	2	2	6	6	0	8	Transfer to Europa League	0–2	2–1	—	3–1
4	(Switzerland) Young Boys	6	1	1	4	4	12	−8	4		2–1	0–3	1–1	—

Source: UEFA
Rules for classification: Group stage tiebreakers

19 September 2018 1	Valencia (Spain)	0–2	(Italy) Juventus	Valencia, Spain
21:00 CEST (UTC+02:00)	Parejo (yellow card) 43'; Murillo (yellow card) 50'; Vezo (yellow card) 54'	Report	Ronaldo (red card) 29'; Pjanić 45' (pen.), 51' (pen.); Alex Sandro (yellow card) 59'; Rugani (yellow card) 90+6'	Stadium: Mestalla; Attendance: 46,067; Referee: Felix Brych (Germany)

2 October 2018 2	Manchester United (England)	0–0	(Spain) Valencia	Manchester, England
21:05 CEST (UTC+02:00)	Lukaku (yellow card) 86'	Report	Coquelin (yellow card) 21'; Rodrigo (yellow card) 32'; Parejo (yellow card) 45'; Piccini (yellow card) 85'; Gayà (yellow card) 87'; Kondogbia (yellow card) 90+2'	Stadium: Old Trafford; Attendance: 73,569; Referee: Slavko Vinčić (Slovenia)
Note: The match, originally scheduled for 21:00 CEST, was delayed to 21:05 CEST due to late team arrival caused by heavy traffic.

23 October 2018 3	Young Boys (Switzerland)	1–1	(Spain) Valencia	Bern, Switzerland
18:55 CEST (UTC+02:00)	Mbabu (yellow card) 42'; Hoarau 55' (pen.)	Report	Gabriel (yellow card) 8'; Batshuayi 26'; Soler (yellow card) 77'	Stadium: Stade de Suisse; Attendance: 31,120; Referee: Andris Treimanis (Latvia)

7 November 2018 4	Valencia (Spain)	3–1	(Switzerland) Young Boys	Valencia, Spain
18:55 CET (UTC+01:00)	Mina 14', 42', (yellow card) 22'; Gayà (yellow card) 30'; Soler 56', (yellow card) 81'	Report	Ngamaleu (yellow card) 18'; Mbabu (yellow card) 35'; Assalé 37'; Benito (yellow card) 38'; Lauper (yellow card) 57'; Von Bergen (yellow card) 67'; Sanogo (red card) 77'	Stadium: Mestalla; Attendance: 36,480; Referee: István Kovács (Romania)

27 November 2018 5	Juventus (Italy)	1–0	(Spain) Valencia	Turin, Italy
21:00 CET (UTC+01:00)	Bentancur (yellow card) 13'; Mandžukić 59'; Cuadrado (yellow card) 60'; Matuidi (yellow card) 83'	Report	Gayà (yellow card) 31'; Kondogbia (yellow card) 43'; Diakhaby (yellow card) 62'; Guedes (yellow card) 69'; Batshuayi (yellow card) 74'	Stadium: Allianz Stadium; Attendance: 39,070; Referee: Willie Collum (Scotland)

12 December 2018 6	Valencia (Spain)	2–1	(England) Manchester United	Valencia, Spain
21:00 CET (UTC+01:00)	Soler 17'; Lato (yellow card) 29'; Jones 47' (o.g.)	Report	Valencia (yellow card) 11'; Bailly (yellow card) 30'; Rashford (yellow card) 82', (goal) 87'	Stadium: Mestalla; Attendance: 36,544; Referee: Georgi Kabakov (Bulgaria)

=== UEFA Europa League ===
==== Knockout phase ====
===== Round of 32 =====
14 February 2019 First leg	Celtic (Scotland)	0–2	(Spain) Valencia	Glasgow, Scotland
21:00 CET (UTC+01:00)	Burke (yellow card) 81'; Toljan (yellow card) 88'	Report	Cheryshev 42'; Sobrino 49'; Kondogbia (yellow card) 82'	Stadium: Celtic Park; Attendance: 57,430; Referee: Ovidiu Hațegan (Romania)

21 February 2019 Second leg	Valencia (Spain)	1–0 (3–0 agg.)	(Scotland) Celtic	Valencia, Spain
18:55 CET (UTC+01:00)	Diakhaby (yellow card) 53'; Gameiro 70'	Report	Brown (yellow card) 24'; Toljan (yellow card) 24' (yellow-red card) 37'; Hayes (yellow card) 58'	Stadium: Mestalla; Attendance: 36,619; Referee: Deniz Aytekin (Germany)

===== Round of 16 =====
7 March 2019 First leg	Valencia (Spain)	2–1	(Russia) Krasnodar	Valencia, Spain
21:00 CET (UTC+01:00)	Rodrigo 12', 24'; Parejo (yellow card) 55'; Coquelin (yellow card) 81'	Report	Kaboré (yellow card) 20'; Claesson (yellow card) 45', (goal) 63'; Martynovich (yellow card) 72'; Olsson (yellow card) 80'	Stadium: Mestalla; Attendance: 36,274; Referee: Orel Grinfeld (Israel)

14 March 2019 Second leg	Krasnodar (Russia)	1–1 (2–3 agg.)	(Spain) Valencia	Krasnodar, Russia
18:55 CET (UTC+01:00)	Pereyra (yellow card) 29'; Gazinsky (yellow card) 78'; Suleymanov 85'	Report	Kondogbia (yellow card) 15'; Soler (yellow card) 75'; Guedes 90+3', (yellow card) 90+3'; Gameiro (yellow card) 90+4'	Stadium: Krasnodar Stadium; Attendance: 35,074; Referee: Anthony Taylor (England)

===== Quarter-finals =====
11 April 2019 First leg	Villarreal (Spain)	1–3	(Spain) Valencia	Villarreal, Spain
21:00 CEST (UTC+02:00)	Cazorla (yellow card) 28', (goal) 36' (pen.); Álvaro (yellow card) 62'; Quintillà (yellow card) 84'	Report	Guedes 6', 90+3'; Gayà (yellow card) 39'; Wass 90+1'	Stadium: Estadio de la Cerámica; Attendance: 17,605; Referee: Michael Oliver (England)

18 April 2019 Second leg	Valencia (Spain)	2–0 (5–1 agg.)	(Spain) Villarreal	Valencia, Spain
21:00 CEST (UTC+02:00)	Lato 13'; Parejo 54'; Coquelin (yellow card) 88'	Report	Raba (yellow card) 24'; Pedraza (yellow card) 34'; Funes Mori (yellow card) 53'; Ratiu (yellow card) 61'	Stadium: Mestalla; Attendance: 26,403; Referee: Willie Collum (Scotland)

===== Semi-finals =====
2 May 2019 First leg	Arsenal (England)	3–1	(Spain) Valencia	London, England
21:00 CEST (UTC+02:00)	Lacazette 18', 26'; Aubameyang 90+1'	Report	Diakhaby 11', (yellow card) 31'; Parejo (yellow card) 70'	Stadium: Emirates Stadium; Attendance: 58,969; Referee: Clément Turpin (France)

9 May 2019 Second leg	Valencia (Spain)	2–4 (3–7 agg.)	(England) Arsenal	Valencia, Spain
21:00 CEST (UTC+02:00)	Gameiro 11', 58'; Garay (yellow card) 38'; Gayà (yellow card) 43'; Gabriel (yellow card) 90+2'	Report	Aubameyang 17', 69', 88'; Lacazette 50', (yellow card) 90+2'; Özil (yellow card) 62'	Stadium: Mestalla; Attendance: 44,481; Referee: Danny Makkelie (Netherlands)

== Statistics ==
=== Appearances and goals ===
Last updated on 25 May 2019

No.	Pos	Nat	Player	Total		La Liga		Copa del Rey		Champions League		Europa League	
No.	Pos	Nat	Player	Apps	Goals	Apps	Goals	Apps	Goals	Apps	Goals	Apps	Goals
Goalkeepers
1	GK	(Spain) ESP	Jaume Domènech	14	0	4	0	9	0	1	0	0	0
13	GK	(Brazil) BRA	Neto	47	0	34	0	0	0	5	0	8	0
Defenders
4	DF	(Argentina) ARG	Facundo Roncaglia	11	0	7	0	1	0	0	0	3	0
5	DF	(Brazil) BRA	Gabriel	46	0	30	0	5	0	5	0	5+1	0
12	DF	(France) FRA	Mouctar Diakhaby	38	3	16+6	2	5+2	0	3	0	6	1
14	DF	(Spain) ESP	José Gayà	49	1	35	1	5	0	5	0	4	0
15	DF	(Spain) ESP	Toni Lato	13	1	3+1	0	4	0	1	0	4	1
21	DF	(Italy) ITA	Cristiano Piccini	38	1	21+2	1	4+3	0	3	0	4+1	0
24	DF	(Argentina) ARG	Ezequiel Garay	35	2	24	2	3	0	2+1	0	5	0
Midfielders
6	MF	(Central African Republic) CAF	Geoffrey Kondogbia	29	1	14+5	1	1+2	0	5	0	2	0
7	MF	(Portugal) POR	Gonçalo Guedes	39	8	18+7	5	2	0	4	0	6+2	3
8	MF	(Spain) ESP	Carlos Soler	51	3	27+4	2	5+2	0	4+2	1	6+1	0
10	MF	(Spain) ESP	Dani Parejo	56	10	35+1	9	7+1	0	5	0	7	1
11	MF	(Russia) RUS	Denis Cheryshev	41	4	19+8	2	1+6	1	1+2	0	2+2	1
16	MF	(South Korea) KOR	Lee Kang-in	11	0	0+3	0	5+1	0	0	0	0+2	0
17	MF	(France) FRA	Francis Coquelin	42	0	20+6	0	4+1	0	3+1	0	3+4	0
18	MF	(Denmark) DEN	Daniel Wass	51	2	27+6	1	7+1	0	3	0	6+1	1
20	MF	(Spain) ESP	Ferran Torres	37	3	8+16	2	6	1	1+2	0	3+1	0
Forwards
9	FW	(France) FRA	Kevin Gameiro	55	13	16+17	6	7+2	3	0+5	1	4+4	3
19	FW	(Spain) ESP	Rodrigo	51	15	29+4	8	5+2	5	5+1	0	4+1	2
22	FW	(Spain) ESP	Santi Mina	44	13	23+7	7	4+1	4	2+1	2	3+3	0
23	FW	(Spain) ESP	Rubén Sobrino	8	1	2+2	0	0	0	0	0	3+1	1
Players who have made an appearance or had a squad number this season but have been loaned out or transferred
16	MF	(Spain) ESP	Nacho Gil	0	0	0	0	0	0	0	0	0	0
4	DF	(Colombia) COL	Jeison Murillo	3	0	1	0	1	0	1	0	0	0
3	DF	(Portugal) POR	Rúben Vezo	12	0	2+2	0	5	0	2+1	0	0	0
23	FW	(Belgium) BEL	Michy Batshuayi	24	3	5+10	1	2+1	1	5+1	1	0	0
26	MF	(Serbia) SRB	Uroš Račić	1	0	0	0	1	0	0	0	0	0
30	FW	(Spain) ESP	Álex Blanco	2	0	0	0	0+2	0	0	0	0	0
