= Rodrigo (footballer, born 1991) =

Spanish footballer

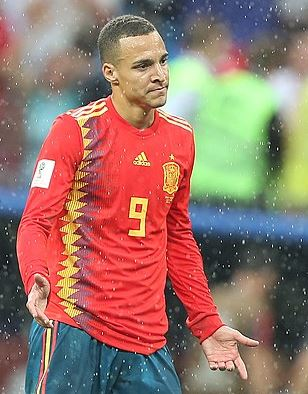
- Rodrigo playing for Spain at the 2018 World Cup

Personal information
- Full name: Rodrigo Moreno Machado
- Date of birth: 6 March 1991 (age 35)
- Place of birth: Rio de Janeiro, Brazil
- Height: 1.82 m (6 ft 0 in)
- Positions: Striker; winger

Team information
- Current team: Lusail
- Number: 19

Youth career
- 2002: Flamengo
- 2003–2005: Ureca
- 2005–2009: Celta
- 2009: Real Madrid

Senior career*
Years	Team	Apps	(Gls)
2009	Real Madrid C	4	(1)
2009–2010	Real Madrid B	18	(5)
2010–2015	Benfica	68	(27)
2010–2011	→ Bolton Wanderers (loan)	17	(1)
2014–2015	→ Valencia (loan)	31	(3)
2015–2020	Valencia	141	(35)
2020–2023	Leeds United	88	(26)
2023–2026	Al-Rayyan	36	(14)
2024–2025	→ Al-Gharafa (loan)	8	(2)
2026–	Lusail	0	(0)

International career
2009–2010	Spain U19	11	(6)
2011	Spain U20	6	(3)
2011–2013	Spain U21	16	(15)
2012	Spain Olympic	4	(0)
2014–2023	Spain	28	(8)
Medal record
Men's football
Representing Spain
UEFA Nations League
Winner	2023 Netherlands
- * Club domestic league appearances and goals as of 17:49, 15 July 2026 (UTC)

Rodrigo Moreno Machado (Spanish pronunciation: [roˈðɾiɣo moˈɾeno maˈtʃaðo]; born 6 March 1991), known as Rodrigo, is a professional footballer who plays as a striker or winger for Qatar Stars League club Lusail.

He started his career with Real Madrid, appearing solely for its reserve teams. In 2010, he signed with Benfica with whom he won four titles, most notably the domestic treble in the 2013–14 season. He then spent six years at Valencia, scoring 59 goals in 220 games and winning the Copa del Rey in 2019. In 2020, he joined Leeds United.

Born in Brazil, Rodrigo represented Spain at youth level, and in 2013 he won the European Championship with the under-21 team. The following year, he earned his first cap for the senior side, appearing for them at the 2018 World Cup.

== Club career ==
=== Early career ===
Born in Rio de Janeiro, Rodrigo moved to Spain in his early teens, settling in Galicia and started playing organised football with RC Celta de Vigo. In 2009, aged 18, he moved to Real Madrid to complete his development.

Only a few weeks after arriving, Rodrigo started playing as a senior with the C team. Shortly after, he was promoted to Real Madrid Castilla in Segunda División B, making his debut with the latter on 29 November 2009 in a 4–3 away win against UD Lanzarote.

=== Benfica ===
On 31 July 2010, Rodrigo signed a five-year contract with S.L. Benfica for a reported fee of €6 million. Real Madrid had an option to re-buy the player for €12 million during the next two seasons; however, after Fábio Coentrão's transfer to the Spanish club, both parties agreed to cancel the buyback clause.

The following month, Rodrigo joined Premier League side Bolton Wanderers on a season-long loan. He made his official debut in a League Cup fixture at Burnley on 21 September, starting in a 1–0 away loss.

Rodrigo first appeared in the league for Bolton on 23 October 2010, coming on as a substitute for Lee Chung-yong midway through the second half of a 1–1 away draw with Wigan Athletic. On 5 January 2011, against the same opponent, he scored his only goal of the campaign, with the game ending with the same result.

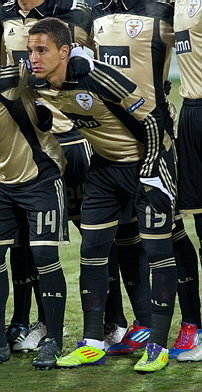
Rodrigo lining up for Benfica in 2012

Returning to Benfica for 2011–12, Rodrigo played 38 competitive matches in his first year and scored 16 goals, including the opener in the season's Taça da Liga final against Gil Vicente FC, which his team won for the fourth year in a row (2–1). On 2 January 2013, he combined with Óscar Cardozo for five goals in a 6–0 home defeat of C.D. Aves in the fifth round of the Taça de Portugal.

On 31 January 2014, Benfica (and Benfica Stars Fund) sold 100% of Rodrigo's economic rights to a private company, Meriton Capital Limited, owned by Peter Lim, for €30 million, plus another potential €10 million on performance-related bonuses– he remained with them until the end of the campaign. On 10 April, he scored a brace in a 2–0 home win against AZ Alkmaar in the quarter-finals of the UEFA Europa League, which took the hosts through to the last-four stage 3–0 on aggregate.

Rodrigo scored Benfica's first goal in a 2–0 final victory over Rio Ave F.C. in the League Cup, and was subsequently voted player of the match as the Lisbon side won the competition for the fifth time in seven years. On 14 May he had his penalty shootout attempt saved by Sevilla FC's Beto, in an eventual Europa League final loss; in total, he contributed 18 goals in 43 appearances across all competitions to win an unprecedented treble of Primeira Liga, Taça de Portugal and League Cup.

=== Valencia ===
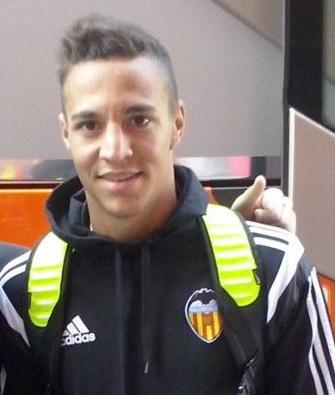
Rodrigo in April 2015, ahead of Valencia's derby against Levante

On 23 July 2014, Rodrigo moved back to Spain, after agreeing to a one-season loan deal with Valencia CF. Although his economic rights were owned by Lim, a loan was arranged to take him and André Gomes to Valencia due to Lim's purchase of the latter club.

Rodrigo made his debut for the Che on 23 August 2014, starting and playing the full 90 minutes in a 1–1 away draw against Sevilla. He scored his first La Liga goal on 22 September, netting the last of a 3–0 away win over Getafe CF through a penalty, but was later sent off; he was dismissed the following 30 May for striking Rayo Vallecano's Toño, and banned for three games by the Royal Spanish Football Federation.

On 15 June 2015, Benfica and Valencia announced they had reached an agreement on Rodrigo's federative rights, and he signed a four-year contract with the latter until 30 June 2019, for a reported fee of €30 million, which made him their most expensive transfer at the time. After moderate returns in his first three seasons at the Mestalla Stadium, he scored a career-best 16 goals (19 in all competitions) in 2017–18 as the Marcelino García Toral-led team qualified for the group stage of the UEFA Champions League; in late November 2017, he was rewarded with a new deal through 2022 with a reported release clause of €120 million.

On 29 January 2019, Rodrigo scored a second-half hat-trick – including two goals in injury time – as the hosts defeated Getafe 3–1 in the quarter-finals of the Copa del Rey, winning the tie 3–2 on aggregate. He also scored in the decisive match, a 2–1 defeat of FC Barcelona at the Estadio Benito Villamarín.

On 17 September 2019, Rodrigo scored the only goal of the match in the first Champions League group stage fixture, providing Valencia's first ever win against Chelsea in the club's history. On 10 December, he repeated the feat in a 1–0 away win over AFC Ajax to reach the knockout phase.

=== Leeds United ===
On 29 August 2020, Leeds United announced the signing of Rodrigo on a four-year deal for a club-record fee of £27 million (€30 million). He made his Premier League debut for them in the first match of the season against reigning champions Liverpool on 12 September, coming on as a substitute in the 4–3 defeat at Anfield. Four days later, he made his first start in a 1–1 draw with League One side Hull City in the EFL Cup (penalty shootout loss).

Rodrigo scored his first goal on 3 October 2020, in a 1–1 home league draw against Manchester City. Having missed several games through a groin injury at the beginning of 2021, he was used sparingly by Marcelo Bielsa upon his return before hitting strong form at the end of the campaign, scoring his first brace for the club on 15 May in a 4–0 away victory over Burnley. He finished his first year with seven goals, four of them coming in the final four fixtures.

Rodrigo scored six times in the league in the 2021–22 campaign. His team managed to stay up on the last matchday.

On 28 January 2023, Rodrigo sustained a bone and ligament injury during a 3–1 win at Accrington Stanley in the fourth round of the FA Cup, and was sidelined until his return as a 66th-minute replacement for Patrick Bamford in the 2–2 home draw with Brighton on 11 March. He went on to manage three more league goals for the remainder of the season, being Leeds' top scorer, but was stricken with injury again – plantar fasciitis – against West Ham, scoring in the 3–1 loss at London Stadium.

=== Qatar ===
On 13 July 2023, Al-Rayyan SC triggered a relegation release clause inserted into Rodrigo's Leeds contract, signing the player. One year later, he was loaned to fellow Qatar Stars League club Al-Gharafa SC.

Rodrigo remained in the country for the 2026–27 campaign, with the 35-year-old joining newly-promoted Lusail SC.

== International career ==
Rodrigo competed for Spain internationally, starting with the under-19s which he helped to the second position in the 2010 UEFA European Championship by netting two goals, including one in the final against France. He then appeared in the 2011 FIFA U-20 World Cup, helping the national team to the quarter-finals with his three goals.

Rodrigo made his debut for the Spanish under-21 side on 1 September 2011, scoring three times in Georgia in the 2013 European Championship qualifiers (7–2 rout). On 21 March 2013, in a friendly against Norway, he scored his 13th goal in the category to help to the 5–2 victory in Toledo, thus becoming the highest goal scorer after surpassing Óscar García's record which had stood since 1992.

Rodrigo was included in Spain's squad at the 2012 Summer Olympics, appearing in two games in an eventual group stage exit in London. On 3 October 2014, he was one of 23 players selected by Vicente del Bosque for UEFA Euro 2016 qualifying matches against Slovakia and Luxembourg, making his debut in the latter game by replacing Diego Costa in the 82nd minute and assisting the fourth and last goal for Juan Bernat.

On 6 October 2017, nearly three years after his first cap, Rodrigo marked his second by starting and scoring the first goal in a 3–0 home defeat of Albania in the 2018 FIFA World Cup qualifiers, in Alicante. He was then included in the squad for the finals in Russia, making his debut in the competition on 20 June when he replaced Costa for the final minute of the 1–0 group stage win over Iran.

Rodrigo was selected for the 2023 UEFA Nations League Finals. He started in the semi-final against Italy, but was an unused substitute in the final against Croatia, which Spain won on penalties.

== Personal life ==
Rodrigo moved to Spain at a young age when his father, Brazilian footballer Adalberto, opened a football school in Vigo alongside 1994 FIFA World Cup winner Mazinho. He is a lifelong friend of the latter's sons Thiago Alcântara and Rafinha, who were raised in footballing terms at FC Barcelona and also represented Spain and Brazil respectively, and was erroneously reported to be their cousin.

== Career statistics ==
=== Club ===
As of match played 14 May 2024

Appearances and goals by club, season and competition
Club	Season	League			National cup (Note: Includes FA Cup, Taça de Portugal, Copa del Rey, Emir of Qatar Cup)		League cup (Note: Includes EFL Cup, Taça da Liga, Qatari Stars Cup)		Continental		Other		Total	
Club	Season	Division	Apps	Goals	Apps	Goals	Apps	Goals	Apps	Goals	Apps	Goals	Apps	Goals
Real Madrid B	2009–10	Segunda División B	18	5	—		—		—		—		18	5
Benfica	2010–11	Primeira Liga	0	0	0	0	0	0	0	0	0	0	0	0
Benfica	2011–12	Primeira Liga	22	9	3	2	4	4	9 (Note: Appearances in UEFA Champions League)	1	—		38	16
Benfica	2012–13	Primeira Liga	20	7	6	2	3	1	10 (Note: Four appearances in UEFA Champions League, six appearances and one goal in UEFA Europa League)	1	—		39	11
Benfica	2013–14	Primeira Liga	26	11	5	2	3	1	9 (Note: Two appearances and one goal in UEFA Champions League, seven appearances and three goals in UEFA Europa League)	4	—		43	18
Benfica	2014–15	Primeira Liga	0	0	0	0	0	0	0	0	0	0	0	0
Benfica	Total		68	27	14	6	10	6	28	6	0	0	120	45
Bolton Wanderers (loan)	2010–11	Premier League	17	1	3	0	1	0	—		—		21	1
Valencia (loan)	2014–15	La Liga	31	3	1	1	—		—		—		32	4
Valencia	2015–16	La Liga	25	2	4	2	—		9 (Note: Five appearances and one goal in UEFA Champions League, four appearances and two goals in UEFA Europa League)	3	—		38	7
Valencia	2016–17	La Liga	19	5	2	2	—		—		—		21	7
Valencia	2017–18	La Liga	37	16	7	3	—		—		—		44	19
Valencia	2018–19	La Liga	33	8	7	5	—		11 (Note: Six appearances in UEFA Champions League, five appearances and two goals in UEFA Europa League)	2	—		51	15
Valencia	2019–20	La Liga	27	4	1	1	—		6	2	0	0	34	7
Valencia	Total		172	38	22	14	0	0	26	7	0	0	220	59
Leeds United	2020–21	Premier League	26	7	1	0	1	0	—		—		28	7
Leeds United	2021–22	Premier League	31	6	0	0	3	0	—		—		34	6
Leeds United	2022–23	Premier League	31	13	3	2	1	0	—		—		35	15
Leeds United	Total		88	26	4	2	5	0	0	0	0	0	97	28
Al-Rayyan	2023–24	Qatar Stars League	15	7	2	2	2	2	—		2 (Note: Appearances in Qatar Cup)	0	21	11
Career total			378	104	45	24	18	8	54	13	2	0	497	149

=== International ===
Appearances and goals by national team and year
National team	Year	Apps	Goals
Spain	2014	1	0
Spain	2017	2	1
Spain	2018	12	3
Spain	2019	7	4
Spain	2020	3	0
Spain	2021	2	0
Spain	2023	1	0
Total		28	8

Spain score listed first, score column indicates score after each Rodrigo goal.

List of international goals scored by Rodrigo
No.	Date	Venue	Opponent	Score	Result	Competition
1	6 October 2017	Estadio José Rico Pérez, Alicante, Spain	Albania	1–0	3–0	2018 FIFA World Cup qualification
2	23 March 2018	Esprit Arena, Düsseldorf, Germany	Germany	1–0	1–1	Friendly
3	8 September 2018	Wembley Stadium, London, England	England	2–1	2–1	2018–19 UEFA Nations League A
4	11 September 2018	Estadio Martínez Valero, Elche, Spain	Croatia	4–0	6–0	2018–19 UEFA Nations League A
5	23 March 2019	Mestalla Stadium, Valencia, Spain	Norway	1–0	2–1	UEFA Euro 2020 qualifying
6	8 September 2019	El Molinón, Gijón, Spain	Faroe Islands	1–0	4–0	UEFA Euro 2020 qualifying
7	8 September 2019	El Molinón, Gijón, Spain	Faroe Islands	2–0	4–0	UEFA Euro 2020 qualifying
8	15 October 2019	Friends Arena, Solna, Sweden	Sweden	1–1	1–1	UEFA Euro 2020 qualifying

== Honours ==
Benfica

- Primeira Liga: 2013–14
- Taça de Portugal: 2013–14
- Taça da Liga: 2011–12, 2013–14
- UEFA Europa League runner-up: 2012–13, 2013–14

Valencia

- Copa del Rey: 2018–19

Al-Gharafa

- Emir of Qatar Cup: 2025

Al-Rayyan

- QSL Cup: 2025–26
- AGCFF Gulf Club Champions League: 2025–26

Spain U19

- UEFA European Under-19 Championship runner-up: 2010

Spain U21

- UEFA European Under-21 Championship: 2013

Spain

- UEFA Nations League: 2022–23

Individual

- UEFA Europa League Squad of the Season: 2013–14
- La Liga Player of the Month: March 2018
- Copa del Rey top scorer: 2018–19 (5 goals)

== See also ==
- List of Spain international footballers born outside Spain
