= Hugo Moreira (footballer, born 1982) =

Portuguese footballer

Personal information
- Full name: Hugo Miguel Gomes Moreira
- Date of birth: 12 April 1982 (age 44)
- Place of birth: Matosinhos, Portugal
- Height: 1.74 m (5 ft 8 1/2 in)
- Position: Winger

Youth career
- 1991–1999: Leixões
- 1999–2000: Porto

Senior career*
Years	Team	Apps	(Gls)
2000–2002	Porto B	24	(10)
2002–2003	União Lamas	25	(4)
2003–2004	Pedras Rubras	34	(5)
2004–2005	Pinhalnovense	4	(0)
2005–2006	Dragões Sandinenses	25	(7)
2006–2008	Espinho	57	(30)
2008–2009	Vizela	19	(0)
2009–2010	Oliveirense	25	(7)
2010–2012	Santa Clara	55	(14)
2012–2013	Covilhã	37	(7)
2013–2014	Leixões	42	(14)
2014–2015	Feirense	6	(0)
2015–2016	Trofense	4	(1)
Total		357	(99)

International career
1997–1998	Portugal U16	6	(3)
1998–1999	Portugal U17	6	(2)
- * Club domestic league appearances and goals

Hugo Miguel Gomes Moreira (born 12 April 1982) is a Portuguese retired professional footballer who played as a winger.

== Club career ==
Born in Matosinhos, Moreira played youth football with Leixões S.C. and FC Porto, making his debut as a senior with the latter's reserves in 2000. From there onwards until 2008, he alternated between the second and the third divisions, representing C.F. União de Lamas, F.C. Pedras Rubras, C.D. Pinhalnovense, SC Dragões Sandinenses and S.C. Espinho.

Subsequently, Moreira spent seven consecutive seasons in the second tier, at the service of F.C. Vizela, UD Oliveirense, C.D. Santa Clara, S.C. Covilhã, Leixões and C.D. Feirense. He retired in 2016, at the age of 34.
