= Leandro Borges =

Portuguese footballer (born 1992)

Personal information
- Full name: Leandro Miguel Pereira Borges
- Date of birth: 29 April 1992 (age 34)
- Place of birth: Sintra, Portugal
- Height: 1.78 m (5 ft 10 in)
- Position: Forward

Team information
- Current team: Florgrade FC
- Number: 29

Youth career
- 2007–2008: Mem Martins
- 2008–2011: Estoril Praia

Senior career*
Years	Team	Apps	(Gls)
2011–2016	Estoril Praia	2	(0)
2012–2013	→ Trofense (loan)	35	(3)
2013–2014	→ Atlético CP (loan)	6	(1)
2014	→ Feirense (loan)	4	(0)
2015	→ Freamunde (loan)	16	(2)
2015–2016	→ Olhanense (loan)	44	(3)
2016–2017	Fafe	29	(2)
2017–2018	Mafra	35	(9)
2018–2019	Vizela	27	(5)
2019–2021	Trofense	18	(0)
2021–2022	Anadia	49	(0)
2022–2023	Beira-Mar	22	(0)
2023–2024	Vila Meã	25	(1)
2024–	Florgrade FC	9	(2)
- * Club domestic league appearances and goals as of 20:49, 17 November 2024 (UTC)

Leandro Miguel Pereira Borges (born 29 April 1992) is a Portuguese footballer who plays for LigaPro club Florgrade FC as a forward.
