= 2014 Taça da Liga final =

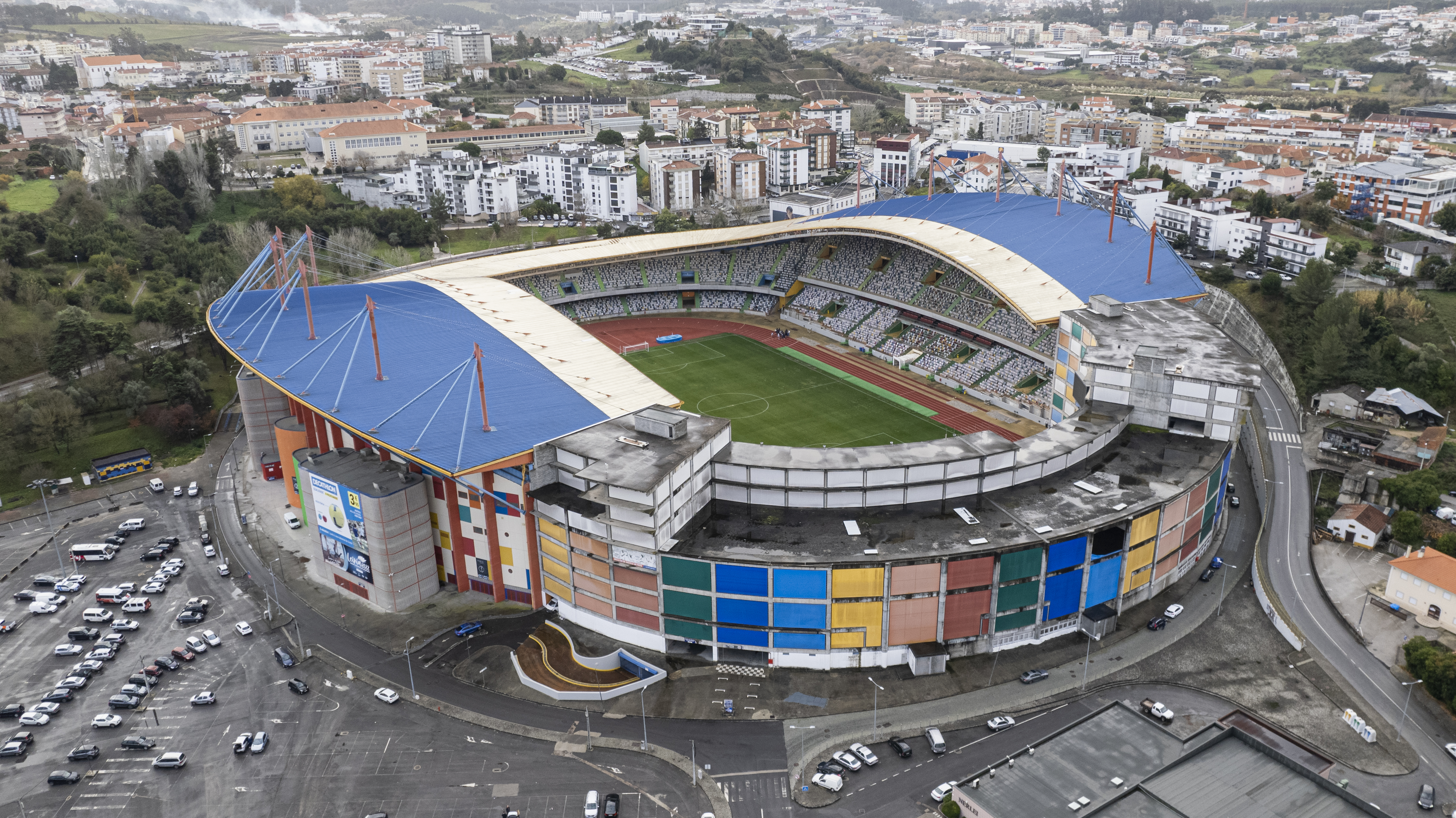
- Estádio Dr. Magalhães Pessoa
- Event: 2013–14 Taça da Liga
Benfica	Rio Ave
2	0
- Date: 7 May 2014
- Venue: Estádio Dr. Magalhães Pessoa, Leiria
- Man of the Match: Rodrigo (Benfica)
- Referee: Hugo Miguel (Lisbon)
- Attendance: 23,119
- Weather: Dry; 18 °C (64 °F)

The 2014 Taça da Liga final was the final match of the 2013–14 Taça da Liga, the seventh season of the Taça da Liga.

Benfica defeated Rio Ave 2–0 to win a record fifth title in the competition.

== Route to the final ==
Note: In all results below, the score of the finalist is given first (H: home; A: away).

Rio Ave			Round	Benfica		
Opponent	Result	Stadium	First round	Opponent	Result	Stadium
Bye			First round	Bye		
Opponent	Result	Stadium	Second round	Opponent	Result	Stadium
Bye			Second round	Bye		
Opponent	Result	Stadium	Third round	Opponent	Result	Stadium
Paços de Ferreira	2–0 (H)	Estádio dos Arcos	Matchday 1	Nacional	1–0 (A)	Estádio da Madeira
Vitória de Setúbal	1–1 (H)	Estádio dos Arcos	Matchday 2	Leixões	2–0 (H)	Estádio da Luz
Sporting da Covilhã	3–1 (A)	Complexo Desportivo da Covilhã	Matchday 3	Gil Vicente	1–0 (H)	Estádio do Restelo
Group A winners: Team / Pld / W / D / L / GF / GA / GD / Pts; Rio Ave / 3 / 2 / 1 / 0 / 6 / 2 / +4 / 7; Paços de Ferreira / 3 / 2 / 0 / 1 / 4 / 3 / +1 / 6; Vitória de Setúbal / 3 / 1 / 1 / 1 / 2 / 3 / –1 / 4; Sporting da Covilhã / 3 / 0 / 0 / 3 / 2 / 6 / −4 / 0			Final standings	Group D winners: Team / Pld / W / D / L / GF / GA / GD / Pts; Benfica / 3 / 3 / 0 / 0 / 4 / 0 / +4 / 9; Nacional / 3 / 1 / 1 / 1 / 4 / 3 / +1 / 4; Gil Vicente / 3 / 0 / 2 / 1 / 2 / 4 / –2 / 2; Leixões / 3 / 0 / 1 / 2 / 0 / 4 / −4 / 1		
Opponent	Result	Stadium	Knockout phase	Opponent	Result	Stadium
Braga	2–1 (H)	Estádio dos Arcos	Semi-finals	Porto	0–0 (4–3p) (A)	Estádio do Dragão

=== Rio Ave ===
As a Primeira Liga team, Rio Ave entered the 2013–14 Taça da Liga in the third round. The third round consisted of three group stage matches with the group winner progressing to the semi-finals. Rio Ave were drawn in group A, alongside Primeira Liga sides Paços de Ferreira, Vitória de Setúbal and Segunda Liga's Sporting da Covilhã. The Vilacondenses opening match was a home tie against fellow first division side Paços de Ferreira. Rio Ave defeated their opponents comfortably with goals in either half from Egyptian striker Ahmed Hassan and winger Ukra. Rio Ave's second group stage match saw the visit of Vitória de Setúbal to the Estádio dos Arcos. After trailing to a first half goal from Setúbal's Nélson Pedroso, Rio Ave's manager Nuno Espírito Santo brought on three attacking minded players in the second half in order to salvage a point for the home side. Nuno's substitutions paid off, as six minutes from the end Joeano's free kick curled into the top corner and beat Vitória's Paweł Kieszek to postpone the decision of who would progress to the semi-finals for the last group stage match. For their final group stage match, Rio Ave played away to Sporting da Covilhã. In a must win match, Rio Ave defeated the Segunda Liga side 3–1 thanks to goals from Bruno Braga, Pedro Santos and Ukra to qualify for a second consecutive League Cup semi-final.

In the semi-finals, Rio Ave played host to group C winners Braga. In an evenly contested match, Rio Ave took the lead on 40 minutes through Ahmed Hassan, who converted from the penalty spot. The penalty came about after a long ball found an on-rushing Bruno Braga who was fouled by Braga's Aderlan Santos. As Aderlan Santos was the last man of Braga's defense, match official Olegário Benquerença had no other option but to send off the Brazilian and reduce Braga to ten men. Replays showed that Santos did not make any contact with Braga, and that the foul occurred outside the penalty area. On the verge of half time, Braga equalized through Custódio, after Raul Rusescu's free kick was saved by Rio Ave's Ederson and Custódio was quickest to react to level the encounter at 1–1. Rio Ave would regain the lead on 69 minutes. A right wing cross from Ukra saw Braga fail to clear the ball on two occasions, which found Bruno Braga on the edge of the box and saw the midfielder strike a volley into Eduardo's right hand top corner to make it 2–1 to the home side. Despite Braga's late pressure, Rio Ave would hold on to reach the final of the Taça da Liga for the first time in their history.

== Pre-match ==
=== Venue ===
On 20 January, the Portuguese League for Professional Football (LPFP), announced that three venues — the Estádio Cidade de Coimbra in Coimbra, the Estádio Dr. Magalhães Pessoa in Leiria and the Estádio Municipal de Braga in Braga — made applications to the LPFP to show their intention of hosting the final of the Taça da Liga. On 24 February, the LPFP announced that the Estádio Dr. Magalhães Pessoa in Leiria would host the final for the first time.

The Estádio Dr. Magalhães Pessoa was the home stadium of União de Leiria between 2003 and 2011 and occasionally hosts Portugal national team matches. It has a seating capacity for 23,888 spectators. Between 2002 and 2003, the stadium underwent renovation works as it was selected by the Portuguese Football Federation as one of the host venues for the UEFA Euro 2004. The stadium played host to two group stage matches, when both France and Switzerland played against Croatia.

== Match ==
=== Details ===
7 May 2014

Benfica	2–0	Rio Ave
Rodrigo 42'; Luisão 78'

Estádio Dr. Magalhães Pessoa, Leiria
Attendance: 23,119
Referee: Hugo Miguel (Lisbon)

Benfica	Rio Ave

GK	41	(Slovenia) Jan Oblak
RB	14	(Uruguay) Maxi Pereira
CB	4	(Brazil) Luisão (c)
CB	24	(Argentina) Ezequiel Garay
LB	16	(Brazil) Guilherme Siqueira
RM	50	(Serbia) Lazar Marković
CM	6	(Portugal) Ruben Amorim	(yellow card) 35'	(substituted off) 84'
CM	35	(Argentina) Enzo Pérez
LM	20	(Argentina) Nicolás Gaitán		(substituted off) 69'
CF	11	(Brazil) Lima		(substituted off) 90+1'
CF	19	(Spain) Rodrigo
Substitutes:
GK	1	(Brazil) Artur
DF	33	(Brazil) Jardel
DF	34	(Portugal) André Almeida		(substituted on) 84'
MF	18	(Argentina) Eduardo Salvio	(yellow card) 88'	(substituted on) 69'
MF	30	(Portugal) André Gomes		(substituted on) 90+1'
FW	7	(Paraguay) Óscar Cardozo
FW	90	(Portugal) Ivan Cavaleiro
Manager:
(Portugal) Jorge Jesus

GK	1	(Portugal) Hugo Ventura
RB	12	(Brazil) Lionn
CB	2	(Peru) Alberto Rodríguez
CB	46	(Brazil) Marcelo
LB	26	(Brazil) Edimar
RM	7	(Brazil) Filipe Augusto
CM	77	(Portugal) Rúben Ribeiro		(substituted off) 68'
LM	8	(Portugal) Tarantini (c)	(yellow card) 77'
RW	17	(Portugal) Ukra
LW	23	(Portugal) Pedro Santos		(substituted off) 80'
CF	9	(Egypt) Ahmed Hassan		(substituted off) 68'
Substitutes:
GK	93	(Brazil) Ederson
DF	15	(Portugal) Tiago Pinto
DF	16	(Portugal) Nuno Lopes
MF	10	(Brazil) Diego Lopes		(substituted on) 80'
MF	11	(Portugal) Bruno Braga		(substituted on) 68'
MF	14	(Portugal) André Vilas Boas
FW	20	(Brazil) Sandro Lima	(yellow card) 70'	(substituted on) 68'
Manager:
(Portugal) Nuno Espírito Santo

Man of the match

- (Spain) Rodrigo (Benfica)

Match officials

- Assistant referees:
  - Hernâni Fernandes (Lisbon)
  - Pedro Felisberto (Lisbon)
- Fourth official: Cosme Machado (Braga)

Match rules

- 90 minutes
- Penalty shoot-out if scores level after 90 minutes
- Seven named substitutes
- Maximum of three substitutions

== See also ==
- 2013–14 S.L. Benfica season
- 2014 Taça de Portugal final
