= InStat =

Sports performance analysis company

InStat Sport
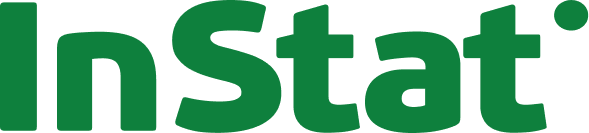
- Industry: Sports performance analysis, broadcasting, scouting
- Founded: 2007; 19 years ago
- Founder: Alexander Ivanskiy
- Area served: Worldwide
- Products: InStat Scout, InStat Scout 5.0, InStat Reports, InStat AutoCrop, InStat Media, InStat TV.
- Website: instatsport.com

InStat Sport is a sports performance analysis company. It was founded in Moscow in 2007, and has international offices and over 900 company representatives. Regional company headquarters are located in Dublin and Philadelphia.

InStat claims that media that use its products include the Russian national sports channel Match TV, Diario AS of Spain, and the Dutch Voetbal International. The company will occasionally provide its analyses to the media and release its own rankings of prospects as part of its InStat Index.

== History ==
InStat CEO Alexander Ivanskiy began by adding football stats into a table to support football professionals with statistical data. It developed to where each action on the pitch was broken down by analysts and later aggregated with the help of artificial intelligence for study via statistical reports on paper or via an e-video platform called InStat Scout.

The first version of the platform was released in 2012. It is now available in more than 30 languages. InStat allows coaches to access stats linked to the videos of actions of any player in the world. In 2016 a tracking method was introduced, providing teams with fitness data and 2D model of the match.

InStat opened a North American office in Philadelphia in 2019.

Recent deals include a partnership with the HockeyTech for providing ice hockey scouting data. The company made a deal with the Central Collegiate Hockey Association in August 2021. InStat had signed an agreement with the Virginia Development Academy in April 2021.

== Products ==
=== InStat Scout ===
InStat Scout is a web platform for performance analysis of teams, players, referees around the world in such sports as football, ice hockey and basketball. It provides access to a wide range of team and individual stats like passing accuracy, xG and many others. The uniqueness of the platform is that all stats are linked to the video episodes. For example, if the last five goals of any player are selected - immediately the videos of the goals are at the fingertips.

The platform offers opportunities for scouting due to a large database of stats and videos, which is particularly important for remote work.

InStat Scout 5.0 database of football players and analysis software on the market in 2020 with more than 150,000 players in the system. With InStat Scout 5.0 quick access to the main parameters is available: matches, season stats, skills, players, tournament leaders all at once place.

=== InStat Reports ===
In general there are three main options of reports available: statistical reports, analytical reports and fitness ones. Reports provided by InStat cover the needs of a professional team: statistical reports on a match have all the data sorted for a user in one place: either a matchday or the whole tournament. Fitness reports for the whole team or each player individually aims at supporting sportsmen energy expenditure level and helps coaching staff to maintain players’ durability over the season. Finally, analytical reports can be made on the next opponent to find the position or team's squad depth and prepare for the upcoming games in the fastest way possible.

=== InStat AutoCrop ===
InStat has its own filming technology: it uses the panoramic 4K footage later supported with AI special algorithms to crop the frame to feature all field players on the screen simultaneously. This footage is superior to the TV video, because coaches have to see every player in any second of the match, while a regular cameraman follows the ball and only shows a few players at any angle.

=== InStat Media ===
InStat offers media support with specific reports for broadcasters, online data feeds for TV coverage and online access to data via mobile app. Media has huge impact in the leagues where local broadcasters refuse to create their own on-screen table sheets with score, sponsors licensees and half-time break on-screen captures. InStat generates automatic creatives for leagues’ needs.

InStat provides data to media partners, which is used in match analysis articles and on air. Live data is used by TV and websites to enrich the broadcast and attract viewers.

=== InStat TV ===
InStat has been filming matches for 12+ years. In 2018 InStat started to work as a broadcasting company and founded a branch called InStat TV, signed a 3-year deal with 380 broadcast matches per season with the second-tier Russian football championship. Since then InStat also signed broadcast deals in rugby, futsal, international football and more sporting events.
