= Holsgrove =

Holsgrove is a surname. Notable people with the surname include:

- John Holsgrove (born 1945), English footballer, father of Lee and Paul
- Jordan Holsgrove (born 1999), Scottish footballer
- Lee Holsgrove (born 1979), English footballer
- Paul Holsgrove (born 1969), English footballer
