= 2023–24 RC Celta de Vigo season =

Celta Vigo
2023–24 season
- President: Carlos Mouriño (until 11 November); Marián Mouriño Terrazo (from 12 December)
- Head coach: Rafael Benítez (until 12 March); Claudio Giráldez (from 12 March)
- Stadium: Balaídos
- La Liga: 13th
- Copa del Rey: Quarter-finals
- Top goalscorer: League: Jørgen Strand Larsen (13); All: Anastasios Douvikas; Jørgen Strand Larsen (13 each)
Home colours	Away colours	Third colours

The 2023–24 season was RC Celta de Vigo's 101st season in existence and 12th consecutive season in La Liga. They also competed in the Copa del Rey.

== Players ==
=== First-team squad ===
As of 31 January 2024

Note: Flags indicate national team as defined under FIFA eligibility rules; some limited exceptions apply. Players may hold more than one non-FIFA nationality.

No.	Pos.	Nation	Player
2	DF	SWE	Carl Starfelt
3	DF	ESP	Óscar Mingueza
4	DF	ESP	Unai Núñez (on loan from Athletic Bilbao)
5	MF	PER	Renato Tapia
6	MF	ESP	Carlos Dotor
7	FW	ESP	Carles Pérez
8	MF	ESP	Fran Beltrán
9	FW	ARG	Tadeo Allende
10	FW	ESP	Iago Aspas (captain)
11	FW	ARG	Franco Cervi
12	FW	GRE	Anastasios Douvikas
13	GK	ESP	Iván Villar

No.	Pos.	Nation	Player
14	MF	USA	Luca de la Torre
15	DF	GHA	Joseph Aidoo
16	MF	BRA	Jailson
17	FW	CIV	Jonathan Bamba
18	FW	NOR	Jørgen Strand Larsen
19	MF	SWE	Williot Swedberg
20	DF	ESP	Kevin Vázquez
21	DF	SRB	Mihailo Ristić
22	DF	ESP	Javier Manquillo
23	DF	ESP	Manu Sánchez
24	FW	ESP	Miguel Rodríguez
25	GK	ESP	Vicente Guaita

=== Reserve team ===
Note: Flags indicate national team as defined under FIFA eligibility rules; some limited exceptions apply. Players may hold more than one non-FIFA nationality.

No.	Pos.	Nation	Player
26	GK	ESP	Coke Carrillo
27	GK	ESP	Ruly García
28	DF	ESP	Carlos Domínguez
30	MF	ESP	Hugo Sotelo
31	DF	ESP	Javi Domínguez

No.	Pos.	Nation	Player
32	DF	ESP	Javi Rodríguez
33	FW	ESP	Hugo Álvarez
34	MF	ESP	Damián Rodríguez
35	DF	ESP	Joel López

=== Out on loan ===
Note: Flags indicate national team as defined under FIFA eligibility rules; some limited exceptions apply. Players may hold more than one non-FIFA nationality.

No.	Pos.	Nation	Player
—	DF	ESP	Sergio Carreira (at Elche until 30 June 2024)
—	DF	ESP	José Fontán (at Cartagena until 30 June 2024)
—	MF	ESP	Miguel Baeza (at Mirandés until 30 June 2024)

No.	Pos.	Nation	Player
—	FW	URU	Lautaro de León (at Mirandés until 30 June 2024)
—	FW	ESP	Julen Lobete (at Andorra until 30 June 2024)
—	FW	POR	Gonçalo Paciência (at VfL Bochum until 30 June 2024)

== Transfers ==
=== In ===
Pos.	Player	Transferred from	Fee	Date	Source
MF	(Spain) Carles Pérez	(Italy) Roma	€5,200,000	1 July 2023	
DF	(Spain) Manu Sánchez	Atlético Madrid	Undisclosed	3 July 2023	
MF	(Ivory Coast) Jonathan Bamba	(France) Lille	Free	18 July 2023	
DF	(Sweden) Carl Starfelt	(Scotland) Celtic	€5,000,000	10 August 2023	
FW	(Greece) Anastasios Douvikas	(Netherlands) FC Utrecht	€12,000,000	28 August 2023	
DF	(Serbia) Mihailo Ristić	(Portugal) Benfica	€1,500,000	1 September 2023	
MF	(Argentina) Tadeo Allende	(Argentina) Godoy Cruz	€4,500,000	31 January 2024	

=== Out ===
Pos.	Player	Transferred to	Fee	Date	Source
FW	(Spain) Julen Lobete	Andorra	Loan	1 July 2023	
MF	(Argentina) Augusto Solari	Released		1 July 2023	
DF	(Spain) Hugo Mallo	Released		1 July 2023	
MF	(Spain) Denis Suárez	Villarreal	Free	1 July 2023	
MF	(Mexico) Orbelín Pineda	(Greece) AEK Athens	€6,500,000	1 July 2023	
FW	(Uruguay) Gabriel Fernández	(Mexico) UNAM	€3,200,000	3 July 2023	
DF	(Spain) Javi Galán	Atlético Madrid	Undisclosed	3 July 2023	
GK	(Spain) Rubén Blanco	(France) Marseille	€2,000,000	30 July 2023	
FW	(Spain) Santi Mina	Released		4 August 2023	
DF	(Spain) José Fontán	Cartagena	Loan	21 August 2023	
MF	(Spain) Gabri Veiga	(Saudi Arabia) Al-Ahli	€40,000,000	26 August 2023	
GK	(Argentina) Agustín Marchesín	(Brazil) Grêmio	Free	10 January 2024	

== Pre-season and friendlies ==
Win Draw Loss Fixtures

On 29 June, the team was scheduled to travel to Portugal to play in the three-team Algarve Football Cup. On 3 July, Celta kicked off the pre-season.

17 July 2023 Troféu do Algarve	Celta Vigo	5–0	Al Nassr	Faro/Loulé, Portugal
20:30 WEST (UTC+1)	Alonso 57'; Larsen 61', 72', 74'; Rodríguez 70'; Tapia (yellow card) 89'	Report	Al-Amri (red card) 51'	Stadium: Estádio Algarve; Referee: António Nobre (Portugal)

21 July 2023 Troféu do Algarve	Benfica	2–0	Celta Vigo	Faro/Loulé, Portugal
20:30 WEST (UTC+1)	Di María 90' (pen.); Musa 90+1'	Report	Núñez (yellow card) 74'; Baeza (yellow card) 80'	Stadium: Estádio Algarve; Attendance: 14,822; Referee: Carlos Teixeira (Portugal)

29 July 2023 Trofeo Memorial Quinocho	Celta Vigo	1–0	Lyon	Vigo
20:00 CEST (UTC+2)	Bamba (yellow card) 20'; Pérez 72'	Report	Kumbedi (yellow card) 43'; Mata (yellow card) 71'	Stadium: Balaídos; Attendance: 12,401; Referee: Miguel González Díaz (Spain)

5 August 2023 Friendly	VfL Wolfsburg	0–1	Celta Vigo	Wolfsburg, Germany
17:00 CEST (UTC+2)		Report	Núñez 29'	Stadium: Volkswagen Arena

8 August 2023 Memorial Antonio Bermúdez	Compostela	0–3	Celta Vigo	Santiago de Compostela
20:00 CEST (UTC+2)		Report	Aspas 30'; Larsen 48'; De la Torre 56'	Stadium: Verónica Boquete de San Lázaro; Attendance: 4,000; Referee: Alejandro Muñiz Ruiz

== Competitions ==
=== Overall record ===
Competition	First match	Last match	Starting round	Final position	Record							
Competition	First match	Last match	Starting round	Final position	Pld	W	D	L	GF	GA	GD	Win %
La Liga	13 August 2023	26 May 2024	Matchday 1	13th	38	10	11	17	46	57	−11	26.32
Copa del Rey	1 November 2023	23 January 2024	First round	Quarter-finals	5	4	0	1	14	6	+8	80.00
Total					43	14	11	18	60	63	−3	32.56

Source: Soccerway

=== La Liga ===
==== League table ====
Pos	Team	Pld	W	D	L	GF	GA	GD	Pts
11	Osasuna	38	12	9	17	45	56	−11	45
12	Getafe	38	10	13	15	42	54	−12	43
13	Celta Vigo	38	10	11	17	46	57	−11	41 (Note: Celta Vigo finished ahead of Sevilla on head-to-head points: Celta Vigo 1–1 Sevilla, Sevilla 1–2 Celta Vigo.)
14	Sevilla	38	10	11	17	48	54	−6	41
15	Mallorca	38	8	16	14	33	44	−11	40 (Note: Mallorca finished ahead of Las Palmas on head-to-head points: Las Palmas 1–1 Mallorca, Mallorca 1–0 Las Palmas.)

Source: LaLiga EA Sports
Rules for classification: 1) Points; 2) Head-to-head points; 3) Head-to-head goal difference; 4) Goal difference; 5) Goals scored; 6) Fair-play points
(Note: Head-to-head record is used only after all the matches between the teams in question have been played)

==== Results summary ====
Overall								Home						Away					
Pld	W	D	L	GF	GA	GD	Pts	W	D	L	GF	GA	GD	W	D	L	GF	GA	GD
38	10	11	17	46	57	−11	41	6	6	7	21	23	−2	4	5	10	25	34	−9

Source: La Liga

==== Results by round ====
Round	1	2	3	4	5	6	7	8	9	10	11	12	13	14	15	16	17	18	19	20	21	22	23	24	25	26	27	28	29	30	31	32	33	34	35	36	37	38
Ground	H	A	H	A	H	A	H	A	H	H	A	H	A	A	H	A	H	A	H	A	H	H	A	A	H	A	H	A	A	H	A	H	A	H	A	H	A	H
Result	L	D	L	W	L	L	D	L	D	L	L	D	L	D	D	D	W	L	W	D	L	L	W	L	L	D	W	L	W	D	L	W	L	W	L	W	W	D
Position	19	16	18	13	16	18	17	18	18	18	18	18	18	18	18	18	18	18	17	16	16	17	16	17	17	17	17	17	17	17	17	17	17	15	17	16	14	13

Source: La Liga
A = Away; H = Home; W = Win; D = Draw; L = Loss

==== Matches ====
The league fixtures were unveiled on 22 June 2023.

13 August 2023 1	Celta Vigo	0–2	Osasuna	Vigo
17:00 CEST (UTC+2)	Núñez (yellow card) 30'	Report	Ru. García 24'; Torró (yellow card) 50'; Gómez 74'	Stadium: Balaídos; Attendance: 20,269; Referee: Pablo González Fuertes

19 August 2023 2	Real Sociedad	1–1	Celta Vigo	San Sebastián
17:00 CEST (UTC+2)	Barrenetxea 22'; Zubimendi (yellow card) 40'; Le Normand (yellow card) 69'	Report	Aspas (yellow card) 51'; Mingueza 90+4'	Stadium: Reale Arena; Attendance: 30,354; Referee: Miguel Ángel Ortiz Arias

25 August 2023 3	Celta Vigo	0–1	Real Madrid	Vigo
21:30 CEST (UTC+2)	Aspas (yellow card) 67'; Tapia (yellow card) 90+4'	Report	Rodrygo (penalty missed) 68'; Kroos (yellow card) 71'; Bellingham 81'; Rüdiger (yellow card) 90+3'; Nacho (yellow card) 90+6'	Stadium: Balaídos; Attendance: 23,057; Referee: Isidro Díaz de Mera Escuderos

1 September 2023 4	Almería	2–3	Celta Vigo	Almería
22:00 CEST (UTC+2)	Pubill (yellow card) 28'; Akieme 54'; Arribas 68'	Report	Núñez 24'; Larsen 33'; Sánchez (yellow card) 55'; Swedberg 87'	Stadium: Power Horse Stadium; Attendance: 14,196; Referee: Ricardo de Burgos Bengoetxea

16 September 2023 5	Celta Vigo	0–1	Mallorca	Vigo
18:30 CEST (UTC+2)	De la Torre (yellow card) 9'	Report	Nastasić (yellow card) 14'; Muriqi 85'; Rodríguez (yellow card) 87'; J. Costa (yellow card) 90+2'	Stadium: Balaídos; Attendance: 18,693; Referee: José Luis Munuera Montero

23 September 2023 6	Barcelona	3–2	Celta Vigo	Barcelona
18:30 CEST (UTC+2)	Christensen (yellow card) 36'; Gavi (yellow card) 39'; Lewandowski 81', 85'; Cancelo 89'	Report	Larsen 19'; Núñez (yellow card) 43'; Douvikas 76'	Stadium: Estadi Olímpic Lluís Companys; Attendance: 43,272; Referee: Mario Melero López

28 September 2023 7	Celta Vigo	1–1	Alavés	Vigo
19:00 CEST (UTC+2)	De la Torre (yellow card) 15' (yellow-red card) 68'; Marín 35' (o.g.); Beltrán (yellow card) 52'; Aspas (yellow card) 52'; Larsen (yellow card) 69'; Pérez (yellow card) 76'	Report	Omorodion 73'; López (yellow card) 78'; Marín (yellow card) 90+2'; Rioja (yellow card) 90+5'	Stadium: Balaídos; Attendance: 16,852; Referee: César Soto Grado

2 October 2023 8	Las Palmas	2–1	Celta Vigo	Las Palmas
21:00 CEST (UTC+2)	Mármol (yellow card) 74'; Viera 84' (pen.); M. Cardona 90+7', (yellow card) 90+8'	Report	Douvikas 67'; Starfelt (yellow card) 83'	Stadium: Estadio Gran Canaria; Attendance: 22,472; Referee: Javier Alberola Rojas

8 October 2023 9	Celta Vigo	2–2	Getafe	Vigo
18:30 CEST (UTC+2)	Aspas (penalty missed) 14'; Bamba 24'; Larsen 42'; Beltrán (yellow card) 53'	Report	Mayoral 2'; Duarte (yellow card) 9' (yellow-red card) 30'; Maksimović (yellow card) 13'; Djené (yellow card) 27'; Carmona (yellow card) 30'; Mata (yellow card) 31'; Greenwood 33'; Aleñá (yellow card) 38'; Rico (yellow card) 81'; Arambarri (yellow card) 90+6'	Stadium: Balaídos; Attendance: 17,953; Referee: José María Sánchez Martínez

21 October 2023 10	Celta Vigo	0–3	Atlético Madrid	Vigo
21:00 CEST (UTC+2)	Villar (red card) 25'; Mingueza (yellow card) 30'; Starfelt (yellow card) 51'; Rodríguez (yellow card) 87'	Report	Griezmann 29' (pen.), 64', 70'; Saúl (yellow card) 54'; Riquelme (yellow card) 87'	Stadium: Balaídos; Attendance: 20,282; Referee: Guillermo Cuadra Fernández

27 October 2023 11	Girona	1–0	Celta Vigo	Girona
21:00 CEST (UTC+2)	Couto (yellow card) 45+7'; Stuani (yellow card) 77'; Juanpe (yellow card) 82'; Herrera 90+1'	Report	Vázquez (yellow card) 55'; Núñez (yellow card) 77'	Stadium: Montilivi; Attendance: 12,671; Referee: Isidro Díaz de Mera Escuderos

4 November 2023 12	Celta Vigo	1–1	Sevilla	Vigo
18:30 CET (UTC+1)	Starfelt 22'; Tapia (yellow card) 45' (yellow-red card) 65'	Report	Soumaré (yellow card) 28'; Rakitić (yellow card) 45'; Torres (yellow card) 65'; Gudelj (yellow card) 80'; En-Nesyri 84', (yellow card) 89'	Stadium: Balaídos; Attendance: 19,023; Referee: Alejandro Hernández Hernández

10 November 2023 13	Athletic Bilbao	4–3	Celta Vigo	Bilbao
21:00 CET (UTC+1)	Sancet 37'; Guruzeta 45+5', 52'; Simón (yellow card) 56'; R. García (yellow card) 90+2'; Berenguer 90+8' (pen.)	Report	Aspas 25', (yellow card) 39', (penalty missed) 72'; Bamba 41'; Larsen 66'; Guaita (yellow card) 90+5'	Stadium: San Mamés; Attendance: 44,435; Referee: Juan Luis Pulido Santana

25 November 2023 14	Valencia	0–0	Celta Vigo	Valencia
16:15 CET (UTC+1)	Amallah (yellow card) 77'; Pepelu (yellow card) 87'; Guillamón (yellow card) 90+2'	Report	Cervi (yellow card) 71'; Núñez (yellow card) 79'	Stadium: Mestalla; Attendance: 43,375; Referee: César Soto Grado

4 December 2023 15	Celta Vigo	1–1	Cádiz	Vigo
21:00 CET (UTC+1)	Larsen 57'; Dotor (yellow card) 90+3'	Report	Carcelén (yellow card) 12'; Ramos 16'; Sobrino (yellow card) 21'; Chust (red card) 33'; Gil (yellow card) 45+2'; Mbaye (yellow card) 59'; Alejo (yellow card) 74'; Alcaraz (yellow card) 90+3'	Stadium: Balaídos; Attendance: 17,302; Referee: Jesús Gil Manzano

11 December 2023 16	Rayo Vallecano	0–0	Celta Vigo	Madrid
21:00 CET (UTC+1)	Valentín (yellow card) 68'; López (yellow card) 73'; Ciss (yellow card) 83'	Report		Stadium: Campo de Fútbol de Vallecas; Attendance: 11,796; Referee: Víctor García Verdura

16 December 2023 17	Celta Vigo	1–0	Granada	Vigo
14:00 CET (UTC+1)	Larsen 20', (yellow card) 22'; Vázquez (yellow card) 29'; Guaita (yellow card) 66'; Dotor (yellow card) 70'; Ristić (yellow card) 75'; Aspas (red card) 80'; Domínguez (yellow card) 84'	Report	Gumbau (yellow card) 90+3'; Diédhiou (yellow card) 90+4'	Stadium: Balaídos; Attendance: 18,027; Referee: José María Sánchez Martínez

20 December 2023 18	Villarreal	3–2	Celta Vigo	Villarreal
21:30 CET (UTC+1)	Pedraza 13'; Mandi 40'; Parejo 48' (pen.); Baena (yellow card) 75'; Comesaña (yellow card) 76'	Report	Vázquez (yellow card) 46'; Douvikas 52', (yellow card) 84'; Larsen 57'; Mingueza (yellow card) 72'; Sánchez (yellow card) 82'	Stadium: Estadio de la Cerámica; Attendance: 14,687; Referee: César Soto Grado

3 January 2024 19	Celta Vigo	2–1	Real Betis	Vigo
19:15 CET (UTC+1)	Aspas 16' (pen.); Villar (red card) 87'; Swedberg 90+6'	Report	Ruibal 6'; Carvalho (yellow card) 33'; Papastathopoulos (yellow card) 90+1'	Stadium: Balaídos; Attendance: 21,105; Referee: Miguel Ángel Ortiz Arias
Note: Villar was sent off for dissent as an unused substitute.

13 January 2024 20	Mallorca	1–1	Celta Vigo	Palma
16:15 CET (UTC+1)	Larin (yellow card) 37', (goal) 43'; González (yellow card) 45+3'; Abdón (yellow card) 88'; Copete (yellow card) 89'	Report	Aspas 10'; Larsen (yellow card) 82'	Stadium: Estadi Mallorca Son Moix; Attendance: 21,130; Referee: Víctor García Verdura

20 January 2024 21	Celta Vigo	0–1	Real Sociedad	Vigo
21:00 CET (UTC+1)	Rodríguez (yellow card) 15'	Report	Méndez 11'; Aramburu (yellow card) 30'; Merino (yellow card) 84'	Stadium: Balaídos; Attendance: 20,901; Referee: Jorge Figueroa Vázquez

28 January 2024 22	Celta Vigo	0–1	Girona	Vigo
14:00 CET (UTC+1)	Jailson (yellow card) 71'	Report	Portu 20'; Blind (yellow card) 50'	Stadium: Balaídos; Attendance: 20,684; Referee: Mario Melero López

4 February 2024 23	Osasuna	0–3	Celta Vigo	Pamplona
16:15 CET (UTC+1)	D. García (yellow card) 12'; Barja (yellow card) 84'	Report	Larsen 24'; De la Torre 25'; Douvikas 90'	Stadium: El Sadar; Attendance: 20,030; Referee: Javier Alberola Rojas

11 February 2024 24	Getafe	3–2	Celta Vigo	Getafe
14:00 CET (UTC+1)	Mayoral 41'; Mata 45+2', 89'; Greenwood (yellow card) 62'	Report	Tapia (yellow card) 50'; Larsen 71'; Ristić (yellow card) 82'; Allende 85'	Stadium: Coliseum; Attendance: 11,502; Referee: Alejandro Hernández Hernández

17 February 2024 25	Celta Vigo	1–2	Barcelona	Vigo
18:30 CET (UTC+1)	Allende (yellow card) 15'; Aspas 47'	Report	Christensen (yellow card) 38'; Lewandowski 45', 90+7' (pen.); De Jong (yellow card) 90+4'; Ter Stegen (yellow card) 90+5'; Martínez (yellow card) 90+10'	Stadium: Balaídos; Attendance: 23,096; Referee: Juan Luis Pulido Santana

25 February 2024 26	Cádiz	2–2	Celta Vigo	Cádiz
14:00 CET (UTC+1)	Juanmi 66', (yellow card) 72'; Alcaraz (yellow card) 86'; Machís 90+10'	Report	Aspas 11', (yellow card) 76'; Tapia (yellow card) 33'; Manquillo (yellow card) 41'; Swedberg 58'	Stadium: Nuevo Mirandilla; Attendance: 18,123; Referee: Miguel Ángel Ortiz Arias

1 March 2024 27	Celta Vigo	1–0	Almería	Vigo
21:00 CET (UTC+1)	Sánchez (yellow card) 71'; Mingueza 73'	Report	Langa (red card) 65'; Lopy (yellow card) 78'; Radovanović (yellow card) 90'	Stadium: Balaídos; Attendance: 18,005; Referee: José María Sánchez Martínez

10 March 2024 28	Real Madrid	4–0	Celta Vigo	Madrid
18:30 CET (UTC+1)	Vinícius 21', (yellow card) 55'; Camavinga (yellow card) 45+1'; Guaita 79' (o.g.); Domínguez 88' (o.g.); Güler 90+4'	Report	De la Torre (yellow card) 25'; Mingueza (yellow card) 55'; Manquillo (yellow card) 82'	Stadium: Santiago Bernabéu; Attendance: 73,644; Referee: Mario Melero López

17 March 2024 29	Sevilla	1–2	Celta Vigo	Seville
14:00 CET (UTC+1)	En-Nesyri 18'; Ramos (yellow card) 29'; Acuña (yellow card) 29'; Navas (yellow card) 56'; Soumaré (yellow card) 90+3'	Report	Pérez 72'; Larsen 78'	Stadium: Ramón Sánchez Pizjuán; Attendance: 36,544; Referee: Francisco José Hernández Maeso

31 March 2024 30	Celta Vigo	0–0	Rayo Vallecano	Vigo
14:00 CEST (UTC+2)	Aspas (yellow card) 70'; Domínguez (yellow card) 84'; Pérez (yellow card) 89'	Report	Chavarría (yellow card) 3'; Ciss (yellow card) 44'; Pezzella (yellow card) 72'	Stadium: Balaídos; Attendance: 21,505; Referee: Alejandro Hernández Hernández

12 April 2024 31	Real Betis	2–1	Celta Vigo	Seville
21:00 CEST (UTC+2)	Pezzella (yellow card) 45+2'; Miranda 53'; Fekir 83'	Report	Larsen 90+1'	Stadium: Benito Villamarín; Attendance: 47,341; Referee: Juan Martínez Munuera

20 April 2024 32	Celta Vigo	4–1	Las Palmas	Vigo
14:00 CEST (UTC+2)	Aspas 37', 76'; Swedberg 39'; Larsen (yellow card) 66'; Douvikas 71'	Report	Herzog 11'	Stadium: Balaídos; Attendance: 21,256; Referee: Francisco José Hernández Maeso

27 April 2024 33	Alavés	3–0	Celta Vigo	Vitoria-Gasteiz
18:30 CEST (UTC+2)	Duarte (yellow card) 20'; Blanco (yellow card) 22'; Simeone 48'; Guridi 54'; Sivera (yellow card) 82'; Benavídez 86'	Report	Pérez (yellow card) 21'; Mingueza (yellow card) 86'; Álvarez (yellow card) 88'	Stadium: Mendizorrotza; Attendance: 18,039; Referee: Juan Luis Pulido Santana

5 May 2024 34	Celta Vigo	3–2	Villarreal	Vigo
16:15 CEST (UTC+2)	Aspas 22' (pen.); Manquillo (yellow card) 25'; Rodríguez (yellow card) 33'; Larsen 39'; Swedberg (yellow card) 64'; Douvikas 82', (yellow card) 85'	Report	Moreno 12'; Comesaña (red card) 17'; Guedes 65'	Stadium: Balaídos; Attendance: 19,548; Referee: César Soto Grado

12 May 2024 35	Atlético Madrid	1–0	Celta Vigo	Madrid
16:15 CEST (UTC+2)	Witsel (yellow card) 72'; De Paul 84'	Report	Starfelt (yellow card) 36'	Stadium: Cívitas Metropolitano; Attendance: 63,014; Referee: Jorge Figueroa Vázquez

15 May 2024 36	Celta Vigo	2–1	Athletic Bilbao	Vigo
22:00 CEST (UTC+2)	Swedberg 68'; Álvarez 71'; Starfelt (yellow card) 80'; Cervi (yellow card) 90+5'	Report	Berenguer 23'	Stadium: Balaídos; Attendance: 21,301; Referee: Víctor García Verdura

19 May 2024 37	Granada	1–2	Celta Vigo	Granada
19:00 CEST (UTC+2)	Méndez (yellow card) 66', (goal) 86'; Torrente (yellow card) 72'; Puertas (penalty missed) 90+7'	Report	Larsen 61'; Bamba 63'; Sotelo (yellow card) 68'	Stadium: Nuevo Los Cármenes; Attendance: 11,473; Referee: Javier Alberola Rojas

26 May 2024 38	Celta Vigo	2–2	Valencia	Vigo
16:15 CEST (UTC+2)	Aspas 49' (pen.); Douvikas 62'	Report	Domínguez 5' (o.g.); Marí 60' (pen.)	Stadium: Balaídos; Attendance: 21,878; Referee: Miguel Ángel Ortiz Arias

=== Copa del Rey ===
1 November 2023 First round	Turégano	0–4	Celta Vigo	Segovia
15:30 CET (UTC+1)	Núñez (yellow card) 22'; Arranz (yellow card) 29'; Ad. González (yellow card) 64'; Alcubilla (yellow card) 84'	Report	Bamba 12', 33'; Pérez 61', 71'	Stadium: La Albuera; Attendance: 2,200; Referee: Mario Melero López
Note: The match was played at the La Albuera in Segovia, instead of Turégano's regular stadium, the El Burgo in Turégano, which did not meet the broadcasting requirements.

7 December 2023 Second round	Sestao River	1–2	Celta Vigo	Sestao
21:00 CET (UTC+1)	Gutiérrez (yellow card) 10'; Núñez 73' (o.g.); Mateo (yellow card) 76'; Joan (yellow card) 77'	Report	Douvikas 17', 78' (pen.); Rodríguez (yellow card) 42'	Stadium: Las Llanas; Attendance: 3,365; Referee: Rubén Porras Rico

7 January 2024 Round of 32	Amorebieta	2–4	Celta Vigo	Lezama
12:00 CET (UTC+1)	Jauregi 30'; Rayco 35'	Report	Rodríguez 6'; Jailson (yellow card) 4', (goal) 49'; Douvikas 52', 75'; Núñez (yellow card) 70'	Stadium: Instalaciones de Lezama Campo 2 Attendance: 1,300; Referee: José Luis Munuera Montero

17 January 2024 Round of 16	Valencia	1–3	Celta Vigo	Valencia
20:00 CET (UTC+1)	Pepelu 29' (pen.); Gasiorowski (yellow card) 86'	Report	De la Torre 13'; Douvikas 18' (pen.), 80'; Vázquez (yellow card) 48'; Swedberg (yellow card) 68'	Stadium: Mestalla; Attendance: 44,456; Referee: Ricardo de Burgos Bengoetxea

23 January 2024 Quarter-finals	Celta Vigo	1–2	Real Sociedad	Vigo
21:30 CET (UTC+1)	Douvikas (yellow card) 45+2'; Núñez (yellow card) 74'; De la Torre 90+2'; Larsen (yellow card) 90+3'; Ristić (yellow card) 90+4'	Report	Oyarzabal 2'; Merino (yellow card) 65'; Becker 66'; Magunazelaia (yellow card) 90+5'	Stadium: Balaídos; Attendance: 20,903; Referee: César Soto Grado

== Statistics ==
=== Goalscorers ===
Last updated 01 March 2024

Rank	No.	Nat.	Player	La Liga	Copa del Rey	Total
1	18	(Norway)	Jørgen Strand Larsen	11	0	11
2	12	(Greece)	Anastasios Douvikas	4	6	10
3	10	(Spain)	Iago Aspas	5	0	5
4	17	(Ivory Coast)	Jonathan Bamba	2	2	4
5	7	(Spain)	Carles Pérez	1	2	3
5	14	(United States)	Luca de la Torre	1	2	3
5	19	(Sweden)	Williot Swedberg	3	0	3
8	3	(Spain)	Óscar Mingueza	2	0	2
9	2	(Sweden)	Carl Starfelt	1	0	1
9	4	(Spain)	Unai Núñez	1	0	1
9	9	(Argentina)	Tadeo Allende	1	0	1
9	16	(Brazil)	Jailson	0	1	1
9	29	(Spain)	Miguel Rodríguez	0	1	1
Own goals				1	0	1
Totals				33	14	47
