= Jordan Holsgrove =

Scottish footballer

Personal information
- Full name: Jordan William Holsgrove
- Date of birth: 10 September 1999 (age 27)
- Place of birth: Edinburgh, Scotland
- Position: Midfielder

Team information
- Current team: Estoril
- Number: 10

Youth career
- Reading

Senior career*
Years	Team	Apps	(Gls)
2019–2020	Reading	0	(0)
2019–2020	→ Atlético Baleares (loan)	22	(2)
2020–2022	Celta B	52	(6)
2021–2022	Celta	5	(0)
2022–2023	Paços de Ferreira	24	(2)
2023–2024	Olympiacos	0	(0)
2023–2024	→ Estoril (loan)	15	(2)
2024–	Estoril	65	(2)

International career
2016	Scotland U17	1	(0)
2017–2018	Scotland U19	7	(0)
2017–2018	Scotland U20	5	(0)
2016	Scotland U21	5	(0)
Medal record
Scotland
Toulon Tournament
Bronze medal – third place	2017 Toulon	U–20 Competition
- * Club domestic league appearances and goals as of 2 October 2026

Jordan William Holsgrove (born 10 September 1999) is a Scottish professional footballer who plays as a midfielder for Primeira Liga club Estoril.

== Club career ==
=== Reading ===
Born in Edinburgh while his father was representing Hibernian, Holsgrove returned to England a few months later, and was a Reading youth graduate. On 13 February 2017, he signed his first professional contract with the club. On 26 February 2019, after already becoming a regular with the club's under-23 squad, he agreed to a new deal until 2021.

On 27 August 2019, after spending the pre-season with the first team, Holsgrove was loaned to Spanish Segunda División B side CD Atlético Baleares on a season-long deal. He made his senior debut on 1 September, coming on as a second-half substitute for Marc Rovirola in a 1–0 home win against UD Las Palmas Atlético.

Holsgrove scored his first senior goal on 3 November 2019, netting ATB's third in a 3–1 home success over Real Oviedo Vetusta. He returned to the Royals in July 2020, despite Atlético Baleares attempting to extend his loan deal to cover for the play-offs, as the season was delayed due to the COVID-19 pandemic.

=== Celta ===
On 10 September 2020, Holsgrove signed a permanent two-year contract with La Liga side RC Celta de Vigo, being initially assigned to the reserves also in the third division. After impressing with the B-side, he made his first team debut on 5 January 2021; after replacing Lautaro De León in the 81st minute, he scored his side's second in a 2–5 Copa del Rey away loss against UD Ibiza.

Holsgrove made his debut in the Spanish top tier on 8 January 2021, replacing Miguel Baeza at half-time in a 0–4 home loss against Villarreal CF.

=== Paços de Ferreira ===
On 27 June 2022, Paços de Ferreira announced the signing of Holsgrove. On 27 July 2023, Holsgrove announced his departure from Paços de Ferreira.

=== Olympiacos ===
On 28 July 2023, Olympiacos announced the signing of Holsgrove, with his immediate loan out to Estoril.

== International career ==
He was part of the Scotland under-20 team that won bronze medal at 2017 Toulon Tournament, the nations first ever medal at the competition.

== Personal life ==
Holsgrove hails from a family of footballers. His English-born father Paul was also a midfielder, while his uncle Lee and his grandfather John were both defenders.

== Career statistics ==
=== Club ===
As of match played 20 September 2026

Appearances and goals by club, season and competition
Club	Season	League			National cup (Note: Includes Copa del Rey, Taça de Portugal)		League cup (Note: Includes Taça da Liga)		Other		Total	
Club	Season	Division	Apps	Goals	Apps	Goals	Apps	Goals	Apps	Goals	Apps	Goals
Reading U21	2017–18	Development League	—		—		—		1 (Note: Appearance in EFL Trophy)	0	1	0
Atlético Baleares (loan)	2019–20	Segunda División B	22	2	0	0	—		—		22	2
Celta B	2020–21	Segunda División B	17	2	—		—		—		17	2
Celta B	2021–22	Primera División RFEF	35	4	—		—		—		35	4
Celta B	Total		52	6	—		—		—		52	6
Celta	2020–21	La Liga	5	0	1	1	—		—		6	1
Celta	2021–22	La Liga	0	0	0	0	—		—		0	0
Celta	Total		5	0	1	1	—		—		6	1
Paços de Ferreira	2022–23	Primeira Liga	24	2	0	0	3	0	—		27	2
Olympiacos	2023–24	Super League Greece	0	0	0	0	0	0	—		0	0
Estoril (loan)	2023–24	Primeira Liga	15	2	3	0	1	0	—		19	2
Estoril	2024–25	Primeira Liga	28	1	1	0	0	0	—		29	1
Estoril	2025–26	Primeira Liga	33	1	2	0	0	0	—		35	1
Estoril	2026–27	Primeira Liga	4	0	0	0	0	0	—		4	0
Estoril	Total		65	2	3	0	—		—		68	2
Career total			183	14	7	1	4	0	1	0	195	15
