= 1999–2000 Real Betis season =

Real Betis
1999–2000 season
- President: Manuel Ruiz de Lopera
- Head coach: Carlos Timoteo Griguol (until 31 January); Guus Hiddink (from 1 February until 1 May); Faruk Hadžibegić (from 2 May)
- Stadium: Estadio Manuel Ruiz de Lopera
- La Liga: 18th (relegated)
- Copa del Rey: Second round
- Top goalscorer: League: Alfonso Pérez (10); All: Alfonso Pérez (10)
- Biggest win: Valladolid 0–3 Real Betis
- Biggest defeat: Celta Vigo 5–1 Real Betis
Home colours	Away colours

The 1999–2000 Real Betis season was the club's 93rd season in existence and its sixth consecutive season in the top flight of Spanish football. In addition to the domestic league, Real Betis participated in this season's edition of the Copa del Rey. The season covered the period from 1 July 1999 to 30 June 2000.

Betis finished in the 18th place to return to the second division after six years.

== Pre-season and friendlies ==
Win Draw Loss Fixtures

Real Betis played one pre-season match against Celta, which ended in a 2–1 loss.

30 July 1999 Trofeo Memorial Quinocho	Celta Vigo (Spain)	2–1	(Spain) Real Betis	Vigo
--:-- CEST (UTC+2)

== Competitions ==
=== Overview ===
Competition	First match	Last match	Starting round	Final position	Record							
Competition	First match	Last match	Starting round	Final position	Pld	W	D	L	GF	GA	GD	Win %
La Liga	21 August 1999	20 May 2000	Matchday 1	18th	38	11	9	18	33	56	−23	28.95
Copa del Rey	10 November 1999	12 January 2000	First round	Second round	4	1	1	2	2	2	+0	25.00
Total					42	12	10	20	35	58	−23	28.57

Source: Competitions

=== La Liga ===
==== League table ====
Pos	Team	Pld	W	D	L	GF	GA	GD	Pts	Qualification or relegation
16	Oviedo	38	11	12	15	44	60	−16	45 (Note: ROV 1–0 NUM; NUM 1–1 ROV)	
17	Numancia	38	11	12	15	47	59	−12	45	
18	Real Betis (R)	38	11	9	18	33	56	−23	42	Relegation to the Segunda División
19	Atlético Madrid (R)	38	9	11	18	48	64	−16	38	Relegation to the Segunda División
20	Sevilla (R)	38	5	13	20	42	67	−25	28	Relegation to the Segunda División

Source: LFP
Rules for classification: 1) points; 2) head-to-head points; 3) head-to-head goal difference; 4) head-to-head goals scored; 5) goal difference; 6) number of goals scored.
(R) Relegated

==== Results summary ====
Overall								Home						Away					
Pld	W	D	L	GF	GA	GD	Pts	W	D	L	GF	GA	GD	W	D	L	GF	GA	GD
38	11	9	18	33	56	−23	42	8	6	5	19	18	+1	3	3	13	14	38	−24

==== Results by round ====
Round	1	2	3	4	5	6	7	8	9	10	11	12	13	14	15	16	17	18	19	20	21	22	23	24	25	26	27	28	29	30	31	32	33	34	35	36	37	38
Ground	A	H	A	H	A	H	A	H	A	H	A	H	A	H	A	H	H	A	H	H	A	H	A	H	A	H	A	H	A	H	A	H	A	H	A	H	H	A
Result	L	D	L	W	L	W	L	W	W	W	L	W	D	L	L	W	L	L	L	W	L	D	L	W	D	D	D	D	L	D	L	D	L	L	L	W	L	W
Position	15	17	18	14	18	14	20	12	8	6	7	6	8	9	11	9	12	12	15	13	14	16	17	12	14	16	15	15	17	17	17	17	18	18	18	18	18	18

A = Away; H = Home; W = Win; D = Draw; L = Loss

==== Matches ====
21 August 1999 1	Athletic Bilbao	1–0	Real Betis	Bilbao
--:-- CEST (UTC+2)				Stadium: San Mamés; Referee: Mejuto González

29 August 1999 2	Real Betis	0–0	Deportivo de La Coruña	Seville
--:-- CEST (UTC+2)				Stadium: Estadio Manuel Ruiz de Lopera; Referee: Llonch Andreu

12 September 1999 3	Málaga	3–0	Real Betis	Málaga
--:-- CEST (UTC+2)				Stadium: La Rosaleda; Referee: Díaz Vega

18 September 1999 4	Real Betis	1–0	Valencia	Seville
--:-- CEST (UTC+2)				Stadium: Estadio Manuel Ruiz de Lopera; Referee: Puentes Leira

25 September 1999 5	Barcelona	4–1	Real Betis	Barcelona
--:-- CEST (UTC+2)				Stadium: Nou Camp; Referee: Andradas Asurmendi

3 October 1999 6	Real Betis	1–0	Oviedo	Seville
--:-- CEST (UTC+2)				Stadium: Estadio Manuel Ruiz de Lopera; Referee: Alfonso Pérez Burrull

12 October 1999 7	Sevilla	3–0	Real Betis	Seville
--:-- CEST (UTC+2)				Stadium: Ramón Sánchez Pizjuán; Referee: Pérez Lasa

17 October 1999 8	Real Betis	2–1	Atlético Madrid	Seville
--:-- CEST (UTC+2)				Stadium: Estadio Manuel Ruiz de Lopera; Referee: Losantos Omar

24 October 1999 9	Rayo Vallecano	1–3	Real Betis	Madrid
--:-- CEST (UTC+2)				Stadium: Estadio Teresa Rivero; Referee: Carmona Méndez

31 October 1999 10	Real Betis	1–0	Real Sociedad	Seville
--:-- CET (UTC+1)				Stadium: Estadio Manuel Ruiz de Lopera; Referee: Esquinas Torres

7 November 1999 11	Celta Vigo	5–1	Real Betis	Vigo
--:-- CET (UTC+1)				Stadium: Balaídos; Referee: José María García-Aranda

21 November 1999 12	Real Betis	2–0	Zaragoza	Seville
--:-- CET (UTC+1)				Stadium: Estadio Manuel Ruiz de Lopera; Referee: Iturralde González

28 November 1999 13	Racing Santander	1–1	Real Betis	Santander
--:-- CET (UTC+1)				Stadium: Campos de Sport del Sardinero; Referee: Rodríguez Santiago

5 December 1999 14	Real Betis	2–5	Espanyol	Seville
--:-- CET (UTC+1)				Stadium: Estadio Manuel Ruiz de Lopera; Referee: Brito Arceo

12 December 1999 15	Alavés	2–0	Real Betis	Vitoria-Gasteiz
--:-- CET (UTC+1)				Stadium: Mendizorrotza Stadium; Referee: Daudén Ibáñez

19 December 1999 16	Real Betis	1–0	Mallorca	Seville
--:-- CET (UTC+1)				Stadium: Estadio Manuel Ruiz de Lopera; Referee: Fernández Marín

22 December 1999 17	Real Betis	0–1	Valladolid	Seville
--:-- CET (UTC+1)				Stadium: Estadio Manuel Ruiz de Lopera; Referee: Andradas Asurmendi

9 January 2000 19	Real Betis	1–2	Numancia	Seville
--:-- CET (UTC+1)				Stadium: Estadio Manuel Ruiz de Lopera; Referee: Megía Dávila

16 January 2000 20	Real Betis	2–1	Athletic Bilbao	Seville
--:-- CET (UTC+1)				Stadium: Estadio Manuel Ruiz de Lopera; Referee: Turienzo Álvarez

22 January 2000 21	Deportivo La Coruña	2–0	Real Betis	A Coruña
--:-- CET (UTC+1)				Stadium: Nuevo Riazor; Referee: Ansuategui Roca

26 January 2000 18	Real Madrid	2–1	Real Betis	Madrid
--:-- CET (UTC+1)				Stadium: Santiago Bernabéu; Referee: Bueno Grimal

30 January 2000 22	Real Betis	0–0	Málaga	Seville
--:-- CET (UTC+1)				Stadium: Estadio Manuel Ruiz de Lopera; Referee: Pérez Lasa

5 February 2000 23	Valencia	3–1	Real Betis	Valencia
--:-- CET (UTC+1)				Stadium: Mestalla; Referee: Díaz Vega

13 February 2000 24	Real Betis	2–1	Barcelona	Seville
--:-- CET (UTC+1)				Stadium: Estadio Manuel Ruiz de Lopera; Referee: Manuel Mejuto González

20 February 2000 25	Oviedo	1–1	Real Betis	Oviedo
--:-- CET (UTC+1)				Stadium: Carlos Tartiere; Referee: Rodríguez Santiago

27 February 2000 26	Real Betis	1–1	Sevilla	Seville
--:-- CET (UTC+1)				Stadium: Estadio Manuel Ruiz de Lopera; Referee: José María García-Aranda

5 March 2000 27	Atlético Madrid	0–0	Real Betis	Madrid
--:-- CET (UTC+1)				Stadium: Vicente Calderón; Referee: Bueno Grimal

11 March 2000 28	Real Betis	1–1	Rayo Vallecano	Seville
--:-- CET (UTC+1)				Stadium: Estadio Manuel Ruiz de Lopera; Referee: Daudén Ibáñez

19 March 2000 29	Real Sociedad	1–0	Real Betis	San Sebastián
--:-- CET (UTC+1)				Stadium: Anoeta; Referee: Carmona Méndez

26 March 2000 30	Real Betis	0–0	Celta Vigo	Seville
--:-- CET (UTC+1)				Stadium: Estadio Manuel Ruiz de Lopera; Referee: Manuel Mejuto González

2 April 2000 31	Zaragoza	1–0	Real Betis	Zaragoza
--:-- CEST (UTC+2)				Stadium: La Romareda; Referee: Esquinas Torres

9 April 2000 32	Real Betis	2–2	Racing Santander	Seville
--:-- CEST (UTC+2)				Stadium: Estadio Manuel Ruiz de Lopera; Referee: Puentes Leira

16 April 2000 33	Espanyol	3–0	Real Betis	Barcelona
--:-- CEST (UTC+2)				Stadium: Estadi Olímpic Lluís Companys; Referee: Megía Dávila

23 April 2000 34	Real Betis	0–1	Alavés	Seville
--:-- CEST (UTC+2)				Stadium: Estadio Manuel Ruiz de Lopera; Referee: Fernández Marín

30 April 2000 35	Mallorca	4–0	Real Betis	Palma
--:-- CEST (UTC+2)				Stadium: Son Moix; Referee: Alfonso Pérez Burrull

7 May 2000 36	Valladolid	0–3	Real Betis	Valladolid
--:-- CEST (UTC+2)				Stadium: José Zorrilla; Referee: Pérez Lasa

14 May 2000 37	Real Betis	0–2	Real Madrid	Seville
--:-- CEST (UTC+2)				Stadium: Estadio Manuel Ruiz de Lopera; Referee: Andradas Asurmendi

20 May 2000 38	Numancia	1–2	Real Betis	Soria
--:-- CEST (UTC+2)				Stadium: Los Pajaritos; Referee: Manuel Mejuto González

=== Copa del Rey ===
==== First round ====
10 November 1999 First leg	Bermeo	0–0	Real Betis	Bermeo
--:-- CET (UTC+1)

1 December 1999 Second leg	Real Betis	2–0 (2–0 agg.)	Bermeo	Seville
--:-- CET (UTC+1)				Stadium: Estadio Manuel Ruiz de Lopera

==== Second round ====
15 December 1999 First leg	Mérida	1–0	Real Betis	Mérida
--:-- CET (UTC+1)

12 January 2000 Second leg	Real Betis	0–1 (0–2 agg.)	Mérida	Seville
--:-- CET (UTC+1)				Stadium: Estadio Manuel Ruiz de Lopera
