= 2020–21 RC Celta de Vigo season =

Celta Vigo
2020–21 season
- Owner: Carlos Mouriño
- President: Carlos Mouriño
- Head coach: Óscar García (until 9 November); Eduardo Coudet (from 12 November)
- Stadium: Balaídos
- La Liga: 8th
- Copa del Rey: Second round
- Top goalscorer: League: Iago Aspas (14); All: Iago Aspas (14)
| Home colours | Away colours | Third colours |

The 2020–21 season was the 97th season in the existence of RC Celta de Vigo and the club's ninth consecutive season in the top flight of Spanish football. In addition to the domestic league, Celta Vigo participated in this season's edition of the Copa del Rey. The season covered the period from 20 July 2020 to 30 June 2021, with the late start to the season due to the COVID-19 pandemic in Spain.

== Players ==
=== First-team squad ===
As of 23 January 2021

Note: Flags indicate national team as defined under FIFA eligibility rules; some limited exceptions apply. Players may hold more than one non-FIFA nationality.

| No. | Pos. | Nation | Player |
|---|---|---|---|
| 1 | GK | ESP | Iván Villar |
| 2 | DF | ESP | Hugo Mallo (captain) |
| 3 | DF | ESP | David Costas |
| 4 | DF | MEX | Néstor Araujo |
| 5 | MF | TUR | Okay Yokuşlu |
| 6 | MF | ESP | Denis Suárez |
| 8 | MF | ESP | Fran Beltrán |
| 9 | FW | ESP | Nolito |
| 10 | FW | ESP | Iago Aspas (vice-captain) |
| 11 | FW | TUR | Emre Mor |
| 13 | GK | ESP | Rubén Blanco |
| 14 | MF | PER | Renato Tapia |

| No. | Pos. | Nation | Player |
|---|---|---|---|
| 15 | DF | URU | Lucas Olaza (on loan from Boca Juniors) |
| 16 | DF | ESP | Jorge Sáenz (on loan from Valencia) |
| 17 | DF | ESP | David Juncà |
| 18 | DF | GHA | Joseph Aidoo |
| 19 | DF | ESP | Aarón Martín (on loan from Mainz 05) |
| 20 | DF | ESP | Kevin |
| 21 | MF | ARG | Augusto Solari |
| 22 | FW | ESP | Santi Mina |
| 23 | MF | ESP | Brais Méndez |
| 24 | DF | COL | Jeison Murillo (on loan from Sampdoria) |
| 25 | GK | ESP | Sergio (3rd captain) |
| 27 | MF | ESP | Miguel Baeza |

=== Reserve team ===
==== List of B-team players with senior squad numbers ====
Note: Flags indicate national team as defined under FIFA eligibility rules; some limited exceptions apply. Players may hold more than one non-FIFA nationality.

| No. | Pos. | Nation | Player |
|---|---|---|---|
| 26 | GK | ESP | Iago Domínguez |
| 28 | DF | ESP | Diego Pampín |
| 29 | DF | ESP | José Fontán |
| 31 | MF | ESP | Gabri Veiga |
| 32 | FW | ESP | Miguel Rodríguez |
| 34 | DF | ESP | Sergio Carreira |

| No. | Pos. | Nation | Player |
|---|---|---|---|
| 35 | MF | ESP | Raúl Blanco |
| 36 | FW | ESP | Alfon (on loan from Albacete) |
| 39 | MF | SCO | Jordan Holsgrove |
| 38 | FW | URU | Lautaro De León |
| 40 | DF | ESP | Carlos Domínguez |

=== Out on loan ===
Note: Flags indicate national team as defined under FIFA eligibility rules; some limited exceptions apply. Players may hold more than one non-FIFA nationality.

| No. | Pos. | Nation | Player |
|---|---|---|---|
| — | GK | ESP | Ruly (at Unionistas until 30 June 2021) |
| — | MF | ESP | Jozabed (at Málaga until 30 June 2021) |
| — | FW | ESP | Álvaro Vadillo (at Espanyol until 30 June 2021) |

| No. | Pos. | Nation | Player |
|---|---|---|---|
| — | FW | URU | Gabriel Fernández (at Zaragoza until 30 June 2021) |
| — | FW | ESP | Juan Hernández (at Sabadell until 30 June 2021) |

== Transfers ==
=== In ===
| Date | Player | From | Type | Fee | Ref |
|---|---|---|---|---|---|
| 21 July 2020 | (Slovakia) Róbert Mazáň | Tenerife | Loan return | | |
| 4 August 2020 | (Peru) Renato Tapia | (Netherlands) Feyenoord | Transfer | Free | |
| 4 August 2020 | (Spain) Álvaro Vadillo | Granada | Transfer | Free | |
| 7 August 2020 | (Turkey) Emre Mor | (Greece) Olympiacos | Loan return | | |
| 15 August 2020 | (Spain) Miguel Baeza | Real Madrid B | Transfer | €2.5M | |
| 17 August 2020 | (Spain) David Costas | Almería | Loan return | | |
| 24 August 2020 | (Spain) Jozabed | Girona | Loan return | | |
| 16 September 2020 | (Colombia) Jeison Murillo | (Italy) Sampdoria | Loan | | |
| 31 December 2020 | (Spain) Aarón Martín | (Germany) Mainz 05 | Loan | | |
| 23 January 2021 | (Argentina) Augusto Solari | (Argentina) Racing Club | Transfer | Undisclosed | |
| 1 February 2021 | (Argentina) Facundo Ferreyra | (Portugal) Benfica | Transfer | Free | |

=== Out ===
| Date | Player | To | Type | Fee | Ref |
|---|---|---|---|---|---|
| 20 July 2020 | (Croatia) Filip Bradarić | (Italy) Cagliari | Loan return | | |
| 20 July 2020 | (Spain) Pape Cheikh | (France) Lyon | Loan return | | |
| 20 July 2020 | (Colombia) Jeison Murillo | (Italy) Sampdoria | Loan return | | |
| 20 July 2020 | (Brazil) Rafinha | Barcelona | Loan return | | |
| 20 July 2020 | (Russia) Fyodor Smolov | (Russia) Lokomotiv Moscow | Loan return | | |
| 27 August 2020 | (Spain) Juan Hernández | Sabadell | Loan | | |
| 7 September 2020 | (Denmark) Pione Sisto | (Denmark) Midtjylland | Transfer | €2.5M | |
| 11 September 2020 | (Uruguay) Gabriel Fernández | Zaragoza | Loan | | |
| 11 September 2020 | (Slovenia) Róbert Mazáň | (Czech Republic) Mladá Boleslav | Transfer | Free | |
| 16 August 2020 | (Spain) Jozabed | Málaga | Loan | | |
| 1 February 2021 | (Turkey) Okay Yokuşlu | (England) West Bromwich Albion | Loan | | |
| 1 February 2021 | (Uruguay) Lucas Olaza | Real Valladolid | Loan | | |

== Pre-season and friendlies ==
Win Draw Loss

| 26 August 2020 Friendly | Celta Vigo | 2–2 | Oviedo | Vigo, Spain |
| 18:00 CEST (UTC+2) | Aspas 19'; Mor 21' | Report | Obeng 12'; Viti 77' | Stadium: Balaídos; Attendance: 0 |

| 2 September 2020 Friendly | Celta Vigo | 2–0 | Lugo | Vigo, Spain |
| 18:30 CEST (UTC+2) | Mor 67'; Aspas 82' (pen.) | Report | Rama (yellow card) 29'; Seoane (yellow card) 57' | Stadium: Balaídos; Attendance: 0 |

== Competitions ==
=== Overall record ===
| Competition | First match | Last match | Starting round | Final position | Record | | | | | | | |
| Competition | First match | Last match | Starting round | Final position | Pld | W | D | L | GF | GA | GD | Win % |
|---|---|---|---|---|---|---|---|---|---|---|---|---|
| La Liga | 12 September 2020 | 22 May 2021 | Matchday 1 | 8th | 38 | 14 | 11 | 13 | 55 | 57 | −2 | 36.84 |
| Copa del Rey | 17 December 2020 | 5 January 2021 | First round | Second round | 2 | 1 | 0 | 1 | 7 | 5 | +2 | 50.00 |
| Total | | | | | 40 | 15 | 11 | 14 | 62 | 62 | +0 | 37.50 |

Source: Soccerway

=== La Liga ===
==== League table ====
| Pos | Team | Pld | W | D | L | GF | GA | GD | Pts | Qualification or relegation |
|---|---|---|---|---|---|---|---|---|---|---|
| 6 | Real Betis | 38 | 17 | 10 | 11 | 50 | 50 | 0 | 61 | Qualification for the Europa League group stage (Note: Since the winners of the 2020–21 Copa del Rey, Barcelona, qualified for the 2021–22 UEFA Champions League based on league position, the spot awarded to the cup winners (Europa League group stage) was passed to the sixth-placed team, and the spot awarded to the sixth-placed team (2021–22 UEFA Europa Conference League play-off round) was passed to the seventh-placed team, Villarreal.) |
| 7 | Villarreal | 38 | 15 | 13 | 10 | 60 | 44 | +16 | 58 | Qualification for the Champions League group stage (Note: Villarreal qualified for the 2021–22 UEFA Champions League by winning the 2020–21 UEFA Europa League. Based on their league position (7th), they would have received the spot above to enter the Europa Conference League play-off round. This spot was vacated without replacement as per UEFA regulations.) |
| 8 | Celta Vigo | 38 | 14 | 11 | 13 | 55 | 57 | −2 | 53 | |
| 9 | Granada | 38 | 13 | 7 | 18 | 47 | 65 | −18 | 46 (Note: Granada finished ahead of Athletic Bilbao on head-to-head goal difference: Granada 2–0 Athletic Bilbao, Athletic Bilbao 2–1 Granada.) | |
| 10 | Athletic Bilbao | 38 | 11 | 13 | 14 | 46 | 42 | +4 | 46 | |

Source: La Liga
Rules for classification: 1) Points; 2) Head-to-head points; 3) Head-to-head goal difference; 4) Goal difference; 5) Goals scored; 6) Fair-play points (Note: Head-to-head record is used only after all the matches between the teams in question have been played)

==== Results summary ====
| Overall | | | | | | | | Home | | | | | | Away | | | | | |
| Pld | W | D | L | GF | GA | GD | Pts | W | D | L | GF | GA | GD | W | D | L | GF | GA | GD |
|---|---|---|---|---|---|---|---|---|---|---|---|---|---|---|---|---|---|---|---|
| 38 | 14 | 11 | 13 | 55 | 57 | −2 | 53 | 9 | 3 | 7 | 30 | 30 | 0 | 5 | 8 | 6 | 25 | 27 | −2 |

Source: La Liga

==== Results by round ====
| Round | 1 | 2 | 3 | 4 | 5 | 6 | 7 | 8 | 9 | 10 | 11 | 12 | 13 | 14 | 15 | 16 | 17 | 18 | 19 | 20 | 21 | 22 | 23 | 24 | 25 | 26 | 27 | 28 | 29 | 30 | 31 | 32 | 33 | 34 | 35 | 36 | 37 | 38 |
|---|---|---|---|---|---|---|---|---|---|---|---|---|---|---|---|---|---|---|---|---|---|---|---|---|---|---|---|---|---|---|---|---|---|---|---|---|---|---|
| Ground | A | H | A | H | A | H | A | H | A | A | H | A | H | H | A | H | A | H | A | H | A | A | H | A | H | A | H | H | A | H | A | H | A | H | A | H | A | H |
| Result | D | W | D | L | L | L | D | L | D | L | W | W | W | W | D | W | L | L | L | D | D | D | W | L | D | W | D | L | W | L | L | W | D | W | W | W | W | L |
| Position | 9 | 4 | 4 | 11 | 13 | 17 | 17 | 17 | 17 | 20 | 18 | 16 | 9 | 8 | 8 | 8 | 8 | 8 | 11 | 10 | 10 | 10 | 9 | 10 | 11 | 9 | 11 | 11 | 8 | 10 | 12 | 9 | 10 | 10 | 8 | 8 | 8 | 8 |

Source: La Liga
A = Away; H = Home; W = Win; D = Draw; L = Loss

==== Matches ====
The league fixtures were announced on 31 August 2020.

| 12 September 2020 1 | Eibar | 0–0 | Celta Vigo | Eibar |
| 16:00 CEST (UTC+2) | Bigas (yellow card) 13'; Álvarez (yellow card) 41'; Diop (yellow card) 81' (yellow-red card) 87' | Report | Nolito (yellow card) 37'; Olaza (yellow card) 73'; Juncà (yellow card) 75'; Yokuşlu (yellow card) 78' | Stadium: Ipurua; Attendance: 0 (Note: The match was played behind closed doors due to the COVID-19 pandemic in Spain.); Referee: Valentín Pizarro Gómez |

| 19 September 2020 2 | Celta Vigo | 2–1 | Valencia | Vigo |
| 21:00 CEST (UTC+2) | Aspas 13', 57'; Tapia (yellow card) 25'; Yokuşlu (yellow card) 90+1'; Villar (yellow card) 90+8' | Report | Gómez 46'; Esquerdo (yellow card) 55' | Stadium: Balaídos; Attendance: 0 Referee: Jesús Gil Manzano |

| 27 September 2020 3 | Valladolid | 1–1 | Celta Vigo | Valladolid |
| 18:30 CEST (UTC+2) | Guardiola (yellow card) 61', (goal) 66' (pen.); Bruno (yellow card) 80'; Sánchez (yellow card) 86' | Report | Mor (yellow card) 25'; Beltrán (yellow card) 41'; Aspas 44', (yellow card) 90+2'; Mallo (yellow card) 65' | Stadium: Estadio José Zorrilla; Attendance: 0 Referee: José María Sánchez Martínez |

| 1 October 2020 4 | Celta Vigo | 0–3 | Barcelona | Vigo |
| 21:30 CEST (UTC+2) | Aidoo (yellow card) 39'; Araujo (yellow card) 48'; Tapia (yellow card) 69'; Murillo (yellow card) 75'; Beltrán (yellow card) 90+3' | Report | Fati 11'; Lenglet (yellow card) 23' (yellow-red card) 42'; Piqué (yellow card) 42'; Olaza 51' (o.g.); Alba (yellow card) 84'; Busquets (yellow card) 87'; Roberto 90+5' | Stadium: Balaídos; Attendance: 0 Referee: Carlos del Cerro Grande |

| 4 October 2020 5 | Osasuna | 2–0 | Celta Vigo | Pamplona |
| 12:00 CEST (UTC+2) | Roncaglia 23'; D. García (yellow card) 55'; Oier (yellow card) 60'; Calleri 76'; R. García (yellow card) 82' | Report | Tapia (yellow card) 26'; Rodríguez (yellow card) 82'; Murillo (yellow card) 90+1' | Stadium: El Sadar Stadium; Attendance: 0 Referee: Ricardo De Burgos Bengoetxea |

| 17 October 2020 6 | Celta Vigo | 0–2 | Atlético Madrid | Vigo |
| 16:00 CEST (UTC+2) | Beltrán (yellow card) 41'; Nolito (yellow card) 63'; Aspas (yellow card) 83' | Report | Suárez 6'; Hermoso (yellow card) 17'; Costa (yellow card) 37'; Felipe (yellow card) 71'; Herrera (yellow card) 86'; Carrasco 90+5' | Stadium: Balaídos; Attendance: 0 Referee: Juan Martínez Munuera |

| 26 October 2020 7 | Levante | 1–1 | Celta Vigo | Villarreal |
| 21:00 CET (UTC+1) | Duarte (yellow card) 31'; Roger 48' (pen.); Toño (yellow card) 78' | Report | Murillo (yellow card) 26'; Olaza (yellow card) 42'; Carreira 52' | Stadium: Estadio de la Cerámica; Attendance: 0 Referee: Mario Melero López |

| 1 November 2020 8 | Celta Vigo | 1–4 | Real Sociedad | Vigo |
| 16:00 CET (UTC+1) | Fontán (yellow card) 47' (yellow-red card) 90+3'; Aspas 77' (pen.) | Report | Silva 24', (yellow card) 56'; Oyarzabal 34'; Guridi (yellow card) 38'; Willian José 54', 81'; Zubimendi (yellow card) 59'; Muñoz (yellow card) 64'; Le Normand (yellow card) 76' | Stadium: Balaídos; Attendance: 0 Referee: Adrián Cordero Vega |

| 6 November 2020 9 | Elche | 1–1 | Celta Vigo | Elche |
| 21:00 CET (UTC+1) | Fidel 4' (pen.); González (yellow card) 13'; Boyé (yellow card) 58'; Barragán (yellow card) 90+4' | Report | Suárez (yellow card) 5'; Mina 41'; Olaza (yellow card) 72'; Aspas (yellow card) 81'; Rodríguez (yellow card) 90+2' | Stadium: Estadio Manuel Martínez Valero; Attendance: 0 Referee: Ricardo de Burgos Bengoetxea |

| 21 November 2020 10 | Sevilla | 4–2 | Celta Vigo | Seville |
| 18:30 CET (UTC+1) | Navas (yellow card) 2'; Koundé 5'; En-Nesyri 45+3'; Escudero (yellow card) 73', (goal) 85'; Munir 87' | Report | Aspas 10'; Nolito 36'; Suárez (yellow card) 54'; Mallo (yellow card) 72' | Stadium: Ramón Sánchez Pizjuán; Attendance: 0 Referee: César Soto Grado |

| 29 November 2020 11 | Celta Vigo | 3–1 | Granada | Vigo |
| 18:30 CET (UTC+1) | Murillo (yellow card) 21'; Nolito 27'; Tapia (yellow card) 45+1'; Baeza 81'; Beltrán 85'; Olaza (yellow card) 90+2'; Mallo (yellow card) 90+6'; Yokuşlu (yellow card) 90+6', (red card) 90+8' | Report | Suárez 25'; Foulquier (yellow card) 53'; Puertas (yellow card) 90+2'; Soldado (yellow card) 90+5' | Stadium: Balaídos; Attendance: 0 Referee: Isidro Díaz de Mera |

| 4 December 2020 12 | Athletic Bilbao | 0–2 | Celta Vigo | Bilbao |
| 21:00 CET (UTC+1) | Núñez (yellow card) 26'; Vesga (yellow card) 84' | Report | Murillo (yellow card) 53'; Mallo 61'; Aspas 78' | Stadium: San Mamés; Attendance: 0 Referee: José Juan Vázquez |

| 14 December 2020 13 | Celta Vigo | 4–0 | Cádiz | Vigo |
| 21:00 CET (UTC+1) | Nolito 6'; Aspas 31' (pen.); Beltrán 43'; Méndez 45+1'; Suárez (yellow card) 54'; Araujo (yellow card) 57' | Report | Mauro (yellow card) 59' | Stadium: Balaídos; Attendance: 0 Referee: Guillermo Cuadra Fernández |

| 20 December 2020 14 | Celta Vigo | 2–0 | Alavés | Vigo |
| 14:00 CET (UTC+1) | Méndez 19', 79'; Araujo (yellow card) 55'; Nolito (yellow card) 61' | Report | Battaglia (yellow card) 20'; Pina (yellow card) 35' | Stadium: Balaídos; Attendance: 0 Referee: Javier Alberola Rojas |

| 23 December 2020 15 | Getafe | 1–1 | Celta Vigo | Getafe |
| 17:30 CET (UTC+1) | Suárez 7', (yellow card) 84'; Nyom (yellow card) 55'; Cabaco (yellow card) 90+3' | Report | Aspas 17' (pen.); Murillo (yellow card) 68'; Araujo (yellow card) 86'; Mor (yellow card) 90+1' | Stadium: Coliseum Alfonso Pérez; Attendance: 0 Referee: Pablo González Fuertes |

| 30 December 2020 16 | Celta Vigo | 2–1 | Huesca | Vigo |
| 19:15 CET (UTC+1) | Nolito 33'; Suárez (yellow card) 37'; Aspas 61'; Mallo (yellow card) 90+6' | Report | Seoane 84' | Stadium: Balaídos; Attendance: 0 Referee: José Luis Munuera Montero |

| 2 January 2021 17 | Real Madrid | 2–0 | Celta Vigo | Madrid |
| 21:00 CET (UTC+1) | Vázquez 6'; Asensio (yellow card) 38', (goal) 53'; Nacho (yellow card) 50'; Carvajal (yellow card) 84'; Casemiro (yellow card) 87' | Report | Méndez (yellow card) 10'; Tapia (yellow card) 42' | Stadium: Alfredo Di Stéfano; Attendance: 0 Referee: Ricardo de Burgos Bengoetxea |

| 8 January 2021 18 | Celta Vigo | 0–4 | Villarreal | Vigo |
| 21:00 CET (UTC+1) | Méndez (yellow card) 58' | Report | Gerard 5'; Gómez 14'; Parejo 19'; Niño 31' | Stadium: Balaídos; Attendance: 0 Referee: Xavier Estrada Fernández |

| 20 January 2021 19 | Real Betis | 2–1 | Celta Vigo | Seville |
| 21:00 CET (UTC+1) | Ruiz (yellow card) 10'; Canales 25', 44'; Robles (yellow card) 69' | Report | Mina 15'; Martín (yellow card) 35'; Suárez (yellow card) 70'; Tapia (yellow card) 90+1' | Stadium: Estadio Benito Villamarín; Attendance: 0 Referee: Juan Martínez Munuera |

| 24 January 2021 20 | Celta Vigo | 1–1 | Eibar | Vigo |
| 18:30 CET (UTC+1) | Méndez 9', (yellow card) 66'; Tapia (yellow card) 35'; Yokuşlu (yellow card) 54'; Mina (yellow card) 80' | Report | Rafa (yellow card) 2'; Expósito (yellow card) 43'; Gil 53'; Recio (yellow card) 64' | Stadium: Balaídos; Attendance: 0 Referee: Pablo González Fuertes |

| 31 January 2021 21 | Granada | 0–0 | Celta Vigo | Granada |
| 18:30 CET (UTC+1) | Herrera (yellow card) 12'; Foulquier (yellow card) 44' | Report | Méndez (yellow card) 24'; Nolito (yellow card) 39'; Aspas (yellow card) 69'; Mina (yellow card) 90+2' | Stadium: Nuevo Los Cármenes; Attendance: 0 Referee: Carlos del Cerro Grande |

| 8 February 2021 22 | Atlético Madrid | 2–2 | Celta Vigo | Madrid |
| 21:00 CET (UTC+1) | Felipe (yellow card) 23'; L. Suárez 45', 50'; Giménez (yellow card) 67' | Report | Tapia (yellow card) 5'; Mina 13'; D. Suárez (yellow card) 78'; Ferreyra 90' | Stadium: Wanda Metropolitano; Attendance: 0 Referee: Guillermo Cuadra Fernández |

| 12 February 2021 23 | Celta Vigo | 3–1 | Elche | Vigo |
| 21:00 CET (UTC+1) | Mina 45', 69'; Méndez 45+2', (yellow card) 53'; Ferreyra (yellow card) 78'; Aspas (yellow card) 82' | Report | Rigoni (yellow card) 36', (goal) 50'; Gonzalo (yellow card) 82' | Stadium: Balaídos; Attendance: 0 Referee: Ricardo de Burgos Bengoetxea |

| 20 February 2021 24 | Valencia | 2–0 | Celta Vigo | Valencia |
| 18:30 CET (UTC+1) | Lee Kang-in (yellow card) 55'; Gayà (yellow card) 62'; Vallejo 90+4'; Gameiro 90+8' | Report | Nolito (yellow card) 14'; Mina (yellow card) 31'; Tapia (yellow card) 53'; Blanco (red card) 64' | Stadium: Mestalla; Attendance: 0 Referee: Valentín Pizarro Gómez |

| 28 February 2021 25 | Celta Vigo | 1–1 | Valladolid | Vigo |
| 14:00 CET (UTC+1) | Tapia (yellow card) 34'; Aidoo (yellow card) 90+3'; Murillo 90+4'; Ferreyra (yellow card) 90+5' | Report | Weissman (yellow card) 4'; Guardiola (yellow card) 40'; Olaza (yellow card) 58'; Orellana 70'; Joaquín (yellow card) 90'; El Yamiq (yellow card) 90+1' | Stadium: Balaídos; Attendance: 0 Referee: David Medié Jiménez |

| 7 March 2021 26 | Huesca | 3–4 | Celta Vigo | Huesca |
| 14:00 CET (UTC+1) | Siovas 14'; Mir 16'; Ferreiro 74' | Report | Mina 5'; Nolito 37'; Mallo 52', (yellow card) 57'; Beltrán 76'; Ferreyra (yellow card) 88' | Stadium: El Alcoraz; Attendance: 0 Referee: José Luis Munuera Montero |

| 14 March 2021 27 | Celta Vigo | 0–0 | Athletic Bilbao | Vigo |
| 14:00 CET (UTC+1) | Mina (yellow card) 45'; Kevin (yellow card) 63'; Murillo (yellow card) 70' | Report | Lekue (yellow card) 41' | Stadium: Balaídos; Attendance: 0 Referee: Santiago Jaime Latre |

| 20 March 2021 28 | Celta Vigo | 1–3 | Real Madrid | Vigo |
| 16:15 CET (UTC+1) | Tapia (yellow card) 25'; Mina 40'; Suárez (yellow card) 78'; Solari (yellow card) 85' | Report | Benzema 20', 30'; Vinícius (yellow card) 22'; Kroos (yellow card) 39'; Nacho (yellow card) 70'; Modrić (yellow card) 80'; Asensio 90+4' | Stadium: Balaídos; Attendance: 0 Referee: Mario Melero López |

| 4 April 2021 29 | Alavés | 1–3 | Celta Vigo | Vitoria-Gasteiz |
| 14:00 CEST (UTC+2) | Laguardia (yellow card) 20'; Lejeune (yellow card) 52', (goal) 86'; Navarro (yellow card) 65'; Méndez (yellow card) 85' | Report | Murillo (yellow card) 2' (yellow-red card) 54'; Nolito 8'; Aspas 14'; Mina 20'; Aidoo (yellow card) 24'; Kevin (yellow card) 86'; Tapia (yellow card) 89'; Mallo (yellow card) 90+4' | Stadium: Mendizorrotza; Attendance: 0 Referee: Antonio Mateu Lahoz |

| 12 April 2021 30 | Celta Vigo | 3–4 | Sevilla | Vigo |
| 21:00 CEST (UTC+2) | Aspas (yellow card) 10', (goal) 20' (pen.), 23'; Méndez 43', (yellow card) 74'; Mallo (yellow card) 50' | Report | Koundé 7', (yellow card) 19'; Fernando 35'; Diego Carlos (yellow card) 58'; Rakitić 60'; A. Gómez 76' | Stadium: Balaídos; Attendance: 0 Referee: Alejandro Hernández Hernández |

| 18 April 2021 33 | Cádiz | 0–0 | Celta Vigo | Cádiz |
| 18:30 CEST (UTC+2) | | Report | Murillo (yellow card) 29' | Stadium: Ramón de Carranza; Attendance: 0 Referee: Pablo González Fuertes |
Note: The match was originally scheduled for 28 April 2021, but was brought forward by La Liga.

| 22 April 2021 31 | Real Sociedad | 2–1 | Celta Vigo | San Sebastián |
| 21:00 CEST (UTC+2) | Elustondo (yellow card) 15'; Portu 25'; Isak (penalty missed) 29'; Januzaj 39' (pen.); Sagnan (yellow card) 90+1'; Fernández (yellow card) 90+2'; Barrenetxea (yellow card) 90+6' | Report | Mallo 22', (yellow card) 90+3'; Murillo (yellow card) 38'; Nolito (yellow card) 62'; Suárez (yellow card) 90+3'; Aspas (yellow card) 90+6' | Stadium: Anoeta; Attendance: 0 Referee: Jesús Gil Manzano |

| 25 April 2021 32 | Celta Vigo | 2–1 | Osasuna | Vigo |
| 18:30 CEST (UTC+2) | Aspas 42', (yellow card) 75'; Murillo 64' | Report | Cruz (yellow card) 25'; Brašanac (yellow card) 32'; Moncayola (yellow card) 36'; Torres 77' (pen.); Sánchez (yellow card) 88' | Stadium: Balaídos; Attendance: 0 Referee: César Soto Grado |

| 30 April 2021 34 | Celta Vigo | 2–0 | Levante | Vigo |
| 21:00 CEST (UTC+2) | Fontán (yellow card) 32'; Méndez 51'; Kevin (yellow card) 56'; Solari 74' | Report | Melero (yellow card) 39'; Vezo (yellow card) 71' | Stadium: Balaídos; Attendance: 0 Referee: Santiago Jaime Latre |

| 9 May 2021 35 | Villarreal | 2–4 | Celta Vigo | Villarreal |
| 18:30 CEST (UTC+2) | Estupiñán (yellow card) 5'; Gómez 25'; Asenjo (yellow card) 33'; Rulli (red card) 45+4'; Gaspar (red card) 45+7'; Gerard 87' (pen.); Pino (yellow card) 89' | Report | Mina 19', 34' (pen.); Araujo (yellow card) 44'; Méndez 45+3' (pen.); Solari 57'; Ferreyra (yellow card) 79' (yellow-red card) 88' | Stadium: Estadio de la Cerámica; Attendance: 0 Referee: David Medié Jiménez |

| 12 May 2021 36 | Celta Vigo | 1–0 | Getafe | Vigo |
| 20:00 CEST (UTC+2) | Nolito 24'; De. Suárez (yellow card) 90+3' | Report | Da. Suárez (yellow card) 67'; Chema (yellow card) 90+1'; Olivera (yellow card) 90+3' | Stadium: Balaídos; Attendance: 0 Referee: Mario Melero López |

| 16 May 2021 37 | Barcelona | 1–2 | Celta Vigo | Barcelona |
| 18:30 CEST (UTC+2) | Messi 28'; Puig (yellow card) 56'; Lenglet (yellow card) 73' (yellow-red card) 83' | Report | Mina 38', 89'; Domínguez (yellow card) 51'; Méndez (yellow card) 89' | Stadium: Camp Nou; Attendance: 0 Referee: Ricardo de Burgos Bengoetxea |

| 22 May 2021 38 | Celta Vigo | 2–3 | Real Betis | Vigo |
| 18:00 CEST (UTC+2) | Suárez (yellow card) 26'; Aspas 32' (pen.), (yellow card) 67'; Domínguez (yellow card) 40'; Nolito (yellow card) 45'; Méndez 49', (yellow card) 90+6'; Solari (yellow card) 90+2' | Report | Ruiz (yellow card) 18', (goal) 73'; Guardado (yellow card) 48'; Iglesias 53' (pen.); Fekir 69'; Tello (yellow card) 75' (yellow-red card) 76'; Moreno (yellow card) 78'; Bravo (yellow card) 89'; Lainez (yellow card) 90' | Stadium: Balaídos; Attendance: 0 Referee: Jesús Gil Manzano |

=== Copa del Rey ===
| 17 December 2020 First round | Llanera | 0–5 | Celta Vigo | Oviedo |
| 21:00 CET (UTC+1) | Arguelles (yellow card) 47' | Report | De León 41'; Nolito 54', 75'; Mor 60'; Mallo 83' | Stadium: Estadio Carlos Tartiere; Referee: César Soto Grado |

| 5 January 2021 Second round | UD Ibiza | 5–2 | Celta Vigo | Ibiza |
| 17:00 CET (UTC+1) | Castel 12', 27'; Ja. Pérez 28'; González (yellow card) 56'; Molina 61' (pen.), (yellow card) 64'; Pardo (yellow card) 79'; Zenitagoia (yellow card) 87'; Rodado 90+3' | Report | De León (yellow card) 33'; Yokuşlu (yellow card) 52'; Fontán (yellow card) 61'; Mina 78', (yellow card) 79', (penalty missed) 90'; Holsgrove 87' | Stadium: Can Misses; Referee: Juan Martínez Munuera |

== Statistics ==
=== Appearances and goals ===
Last updated on 22 May 2021.

| No. | Pos | Nat | Player | Total | | La Liga | | Copa del Rey | |
| No. | Pos | Nat | Player | Apps | Goals | Apps | Goals | Apps | Goals |
Goalkeepers
| 1 | GK | (Spain) ESP | Iván Villar | 23 | 0 | 19+2 | 0 | 2 | 0 |
| 13 | GK | (Spain) ESP | Rubén Blanco | 19 | 0 | 19 | 0 | 0 | 0 |
| 25 | GK | (Spain) ESP | Sergio | 0 | 0 | 0 | 0 | 0 | 0 |
Defenders
| 2 | DF | (Spain) ESP | Hugo Mallo | 32 | 4 | 30+1 | 3 | 0+1 | 1 |
| 3 | DF | (Spain) ESP | David Costas | 0 | 0 | 0 | 0 | 0 | 0 |
| 4 | DF | (Mexico) MEX | Néstor Araujo | 33 | 0 | 26+7 | 0 | 0 | 0 |
| 16 | DF | (Spain) ESP | Jorge Sáenz | 0 | 0 | 0 | 0 | 0 | 0 |
| 17 | DF | (Spain) ESP | David Juncà | 0 | 0 | 0 | 0 | 0 | 0 |
| 18 | DF | (Ghana) GHA | Joseph Aidoo | 27 | 0 | 14+11 | 0 | 2 | 0 |
| 19 | DF | (Spain) ESP | Aarón Martín | 20 | 0 | 17+2 | 0 | 1 | 0 |
| 20 | DF | (Spain) ESP | Kevin Vázquez | 8 | 0 | 5+3 | 0 | 0 | 0 |
| 24 | DF | (Colombia) COL | Jeison Murillo | 32 | 2 | 31 | 2 | 1 | 0 |
| 29 | DF | (Spain) ESP | José Fontán | 16 | 0 | 7+7 | 0 | 2 | 0 |
| 34 | DF | (Spain) ESP | Sergio Carreira | 5 | 1 | 3 | 1 | 2 | 0 |
| 40 | DF | (Spain) ESP | Carlos Domínguez | 4 | 0 | 4 | 0 | 0 | 0 |
Midfielders
| 6 | MF | (Spain) ESP | Denis Suárez | 37 | 0 | 34+1 | 0 | 1+1 | 0 |
| 8 | MF | (Spain) ESP | Fran Beltrán | 34 | 3 | 13+19 | 3 | 2 | 0 |
| 14 | MF | (Peru) PER | Renato Tapia | 34 | 0 | 32 | 0 | 1+1 | 0 |
| 21 | MF | (Argentina) ARG | Augusto Solari | 16 | 2 | 3+13 | 2 | 0 | 0 |
| 23 | MF | (Spain) ESP | Brais Méndez | 36 | 9 | 30+4 | 9 | 1+1 | 0 |
| 27 | MF | (Spain) ESP | Miguel Baeza | 24 | 1 | 4+18 | 1 | 1+1 | 0 |
| 31 | MF | (Spain) ESP | Gabri Veiga | 6 | 0 | 1+5 | 0 | 0 | 0 |
| 39 | MF | (Scotland) SCO | Jordan Holsgrove | 6 | 1 | 0+5 | 0 | 0+1 | 1 |
| 44 | MF | (Spain) ESP | Hugo Sotelo | 1 | 0 | 0+1 | 0 | 0 | 0 |
Forwards
| 9 | FW | (Spain) ESP | Nolito | 37 | 9 | 35+1 | 7 | 0+1 | 2 |
| 10 | FW | (Spain) ESP | Iago Aspas | 34 | 14 | 33 | 14 | 0+1 | 0 |
| 11 | FW | (Turkey) TUR | Emre Mor | 13 | 1 | 6+5 | 0 | 2 | 1 |
| 12 | FW | (Argentina) ARG | Facundo Ferreyra | 13 | 1 | 2+11 | 1 | 0 | 0 |
| 22 | FW | (Spain) ESP | Santi Mina | 35 | 13 | 29+5 | 12 | 0+1 | 1 |
| 32 | FW | (Spain) ESP | Miguel Rodríguez | 4 | 0 | 0+4 | 0 | 0 | 0 |
| 36 | FW | (Spain) ESP | Alfon | 3 | 0 | 0+2 | 0 | 0+1 | 0 |
| 38 | FW | (Uruguay) URU | Lautaro De León | 3 | 1 | 0+1 | 0 | 2 | 1 |
Players who have made an appearance or had a squad number this season but have left the club
| 5 | MF | (Turkey) TUR | Okay Yokuşlu | 14 | 0 | 3+9 | 0 | 2 | 0 |
| 15 | DF | (Uruguay) URU | Lucas Olaza | 18 | 0 | 18 | 0 | 0 | 0 |

=== Goalscorers ===
As of 16 May 2021

| Rank | No. | Pos | Nat | Name | La Liga | Copa del Rey | Total |
|---|---|---|---|---|---|---|---|
| 1 | 10 | FW | (Spain) | Iago Aspas | 13 | 0 | 13 |
| 1 | 22 | FW | (Spain) | Santi Mina | 12 | 1 | 13 |
| 3 | 9 | FW | (Spain) | Nolito | 7 | 2 | 9 |
| 4 | 23 | MF | (Spain) | Brais Méndez | 8 | 0 | 8 |
| 5 | 2 | DF | (Spain) | Hugo Mallo | 3 | 1 | 4 |
| 6 | 8 | MF | (Spain) | Fran Beltrán | 3 | 0 | 3 |
| 7 | 21 | FW | (Argentina) | Augusto Solari | 2 | 0 | 2 |
| 7 | 24 | DF | (Colombia) | Jeison Murillo | 2 | 0 | 2 |
| 9 | 8 | MF | (Scotland) | Jordan Holsgrove | 0 | 1 | 1 |
| 9 | 11 | FW | (Turkey) | Emre Mor | 0 | 1 | 1 |
| 9 | 12 | FW | (Argentina) | Facundo Ferreyra | 1 | 0 | 1 |
| 9 | 27 | MF | (Spain) | Miguel Baeza | 1 | 0 | 1 |
| 9 | 34 | DF | (Spain) | Sergio Carreira | 1 | 0 | 1 |
| 9 | 38 | FW | (Uruguay) | Lautaro De León | 0 | 1 | 1 |
| Totals | | | | | 53 | 7 | 60 |
