= Santiago Mina (footballer, born 1958) =

Spanish footballer

Personal information
- Full name: Santiago Mina Vallespín
- Date of birth: 11 March 1958 (age 68)
- Place of birth: Urrea de Gaén, Spain
- Height: 1.72 m (5 ft 8 in)
- Position: Defender

Senior career*
Years	Team	Apps	(Gls)
1976–1981	Barcelona B	72	(0)
1979–1980	→ Algeciras (loan)	17	(0)
1980–1981	→ Sabadell (loan)	14	(0)
1981–1984	Celta	22	(0)
1984–1985	Lorca Deportiva	10	(0)
Total		135	(0)

International career
1977	Spain U21	1	(0)
- * Club domestic league appearances and goals

Santiago Mina Vallespín (born 11 March 1958) is a Spanish former footballer who played mainly as a central defender.

== Club career ==
Born in Urrea de Gaén, Province of Teruel, Aragon, Mina began his professional career with FC Barcelona Atlètic, being relegated from Segunda División at the end of the 1976–77 season. He spent the vast majority of his career in that tier, also representing Algeciras CF (on loan, as he was doing his military service in the city), CE Sabadell FC (loan), RC Celta de Vigo and Lorca Deportiva CF.

With Celta, Mina achieved promotion to La Liga in 1982 but only contributed three matches to that feat. He made his debut in the competition on 5 September 1982, starting in a 1–0 away loss against Sevilla FC as the campaign eventually ended in relegation.

Whilst at the service of Lorca, on 14 October 1984, Mina was sent off for the only time in his career, given a straight red card by referee Alfonso Álvarez in a 6–0 defeat at UD Salamanca. He retired in 1985 following his last club's relegation, aged only 27.

== International career ==
Mina played once with the Spain under-21 team: on 26 October 1977, in a fixture against Romania in Bucharest for the 1978 UEFA European Championship qualifiers, he committed a 10th-minute penalty that was missed, and later scored an own goal in an eventual 4–0 loss.

== Personal life ==
Mina's son, also named Santiago, is also a footballer. A forward, he too represented Celta.

== Honours ==
Celta

- Segunda División: 1981–82
