= Kevin Vázquez =

Spanish footballer

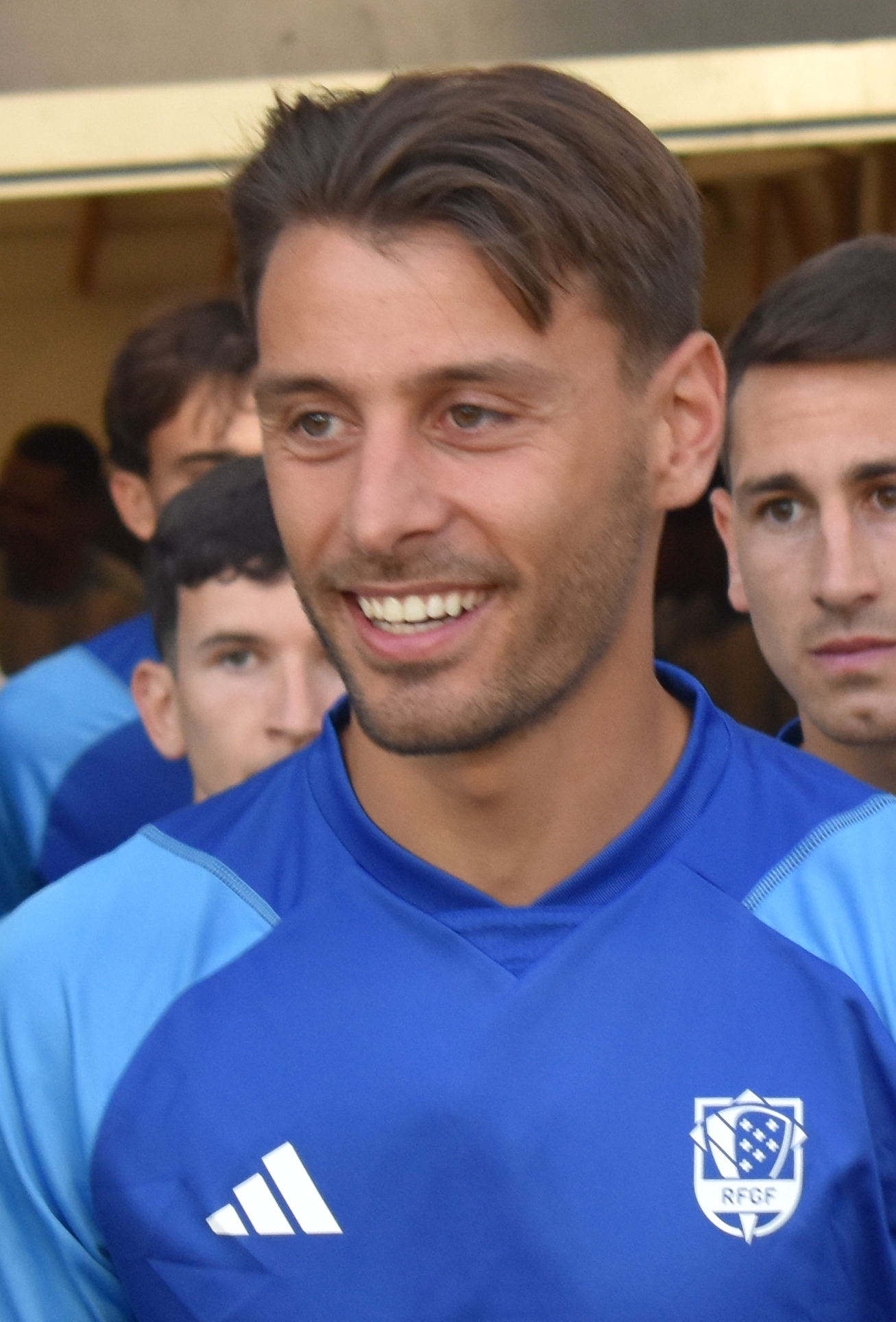
- Kevin with Galicia in 2024

Personal information
- Full name: Kevin Vázquez Comesaña
- Date of birth: 23 March 1993 (age 33)
- Place of birth: Nigrán, Spain
- Height: 1.73 m (5 ft 8 in)
- Position: Right-back

Team information
- Current team: Þór Akureyri
- Number: 23

Youth career
- 2009–2012: Celta

Senior career*
Years	Team	Apps	(Gls)
2010–2018	Celta B	161	(1)
2018–2024	Celta	68	(0)
2024–2026	Sporting Gijón	35	(0)
2026–	Þór Akureyri	11	(0)

International career
2024	Galicia	1	(0)
- * Club domestic league appearances and goals as of 16 November 2026

Kevin Vázquez Comesaña (born 23 March 1993), simply known as Kevin, is a Spanish professional footballer who plays as a right-back for Icelandic club Þór Akureyri.

== Career ==
Born in Nigrán, Pontevedra, Galicia, Kevin joined Celta de Vigo's youth setup in 2009. On 14 February of the following year, he made his senior debut with the reserves at the age of just 16, coming on as a late substitute for Álex López in a 3–2 Segunda División B away loss against SD Eibar.

Kevin was definitely promoted to the B-team ahead of the 2012–13 campaign now in Tercera División, and contributed with 14 appearances as his side achieved immediate promotion back to the third division. On 28 June 2016, now already an undisputed starter, he renewed his contract until 2018.

Kevin scored his first senior goal on 5 February 2017, netting the second in a 4–0 away routing of Pontevedra CF. In July of the following year, he was definitely promoted to the main squad in La Liga, and extended his contract until 2023.

Kevin made his professional debut on 2 October 2018, starting in a 1–1 home draw against Real Sociedad, for the season's Copa del Rey. He remained mainly a backup option in the following seasons, becoming a team captain and renewing his contract until 2025 on 28 June 2023.

On 28 August 2024, Kevin terminated his link with the Celestes, and signed a two-year deal with Segunda División side Sporting de Gijón just hours later.

== Career statistics ==
As of match played 16 November 2026

Appearances and goals by club, season and competition
Club	Season	League			Copa del Rey		Other		Total	
Club	Season	Division	Apps	Goals	Apps	Goals	Apps	Goals	Apps	Goals
Celta B	2009–10	Segunda División B	2	0	—		—		2	0
Celta B	2011–12	Segunda División B	1	0	—		—		1	0
Celta B	2012–13	Tercera División	15	0	—		6 (Note: Appearance(s) in Promotion Playoffs)	0	21	0
Celta B	2013–14	Segunda División B	14	0	—		—		14	0
Celta B	2014–15	Segunda División B	28	0	—		—		28	0
Celta B	2015–16	Segunda División B	36	0	—		—		36	0
Celta B	2016–17	Segunda División B	37	1	—		2	0	39	1
Celta B	2017–18	Segunda División B	28	0	—		4	0	32	0
Celta B	Total		161	1	0	0	12	0	173	1
Celta	2014–15	La Liga	0	0	0	0	—		0	0
Celta	2018–19	La Liga	4	0	2	0	—		6	0
Celta	2019–20	La Liga	17	0	3	0	—		20	0
Celta	2020–21	La Liga	8	0	0	0	—		0	0
Celta	2021–22	La Liga	17	0	2	0	—		0	0
Celta	2022–23	La Liga	10	0	2	1	—		0	0
Celta	2023–24	La Liga	12	0	5	0	—		0	0
Celta	Total		68	0	14	1	0	0	82	1
Sporting Gijón	2024–25	Segunda División	19	0	2	0	—		21	0
Sporting Gijón	2025–26	Segunda División	16	0	3	0	—		19	0
Sporting Gijón	Total		35	0	5	0	0	0	40	0
Þór Akureyri	2026	Besta deild karla	11	0	0	0	—		11	0
Career total			275	1	19	1	12	0	306	2
