= Carlos Domínguez (Spanish footballer) =

Spanish footballer

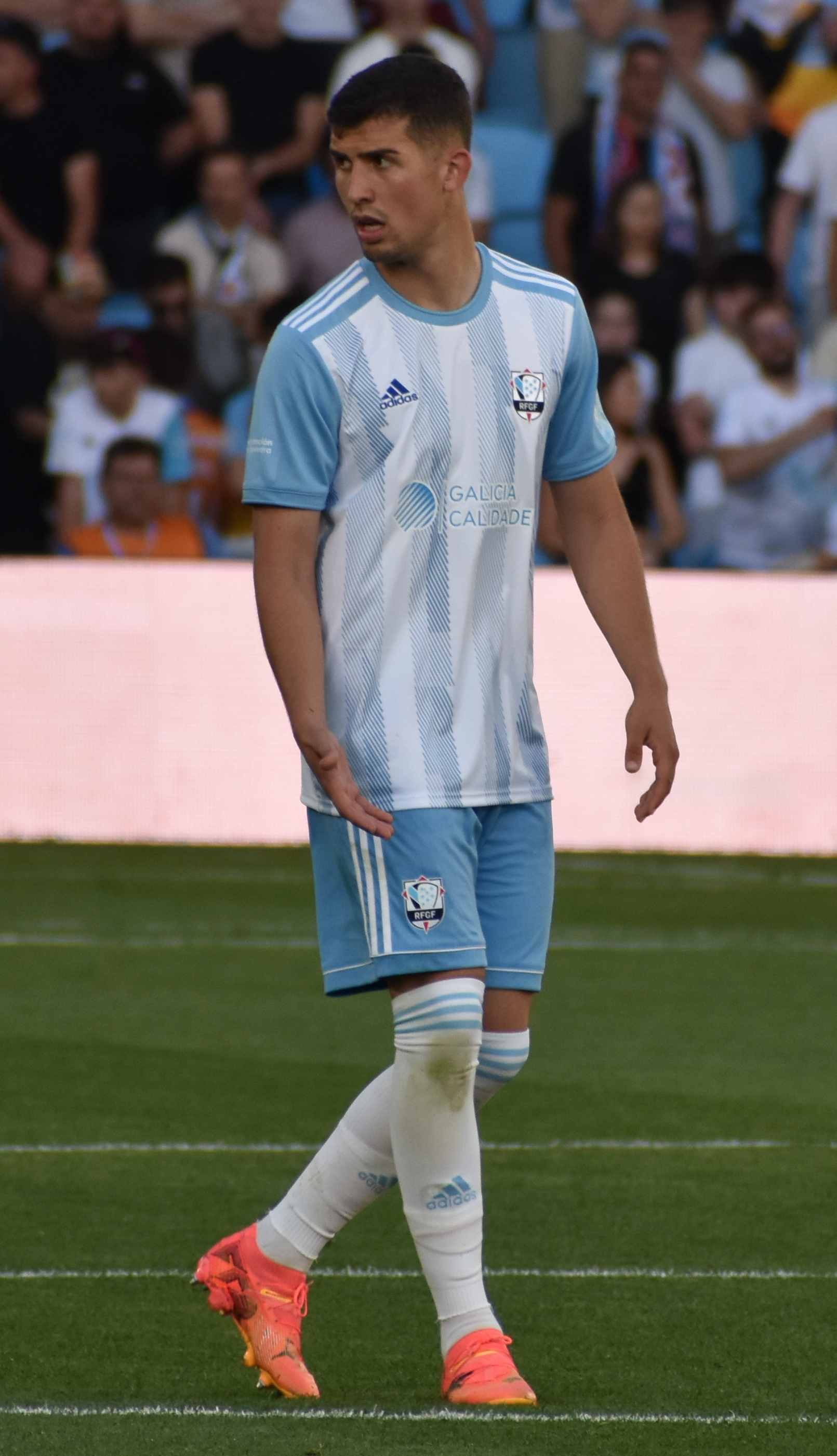
- Domínguez with Galicia in 2024

Personal information
- Full name: Carlos Dominguez Cáceres
- Date of birth: 11 February 2001 (age 25)
- Place of birth: Vigo, Spain
- Height: 1.87 m (6 ft 2 in)
- Positions: Centre-back; left-back

Team information
- Current team: Oviedo (on loan from Celta)

Youth career
- Celta

Senior career*
Years	Team	Apps	(Gls)
2020–2023	Celta B	49	(1)
2021–	Celta	64	(0)
2026–	→ Oviedo (loan)	0	(0)

International career^{‡}
2024	Galicia	1	(0)
- * Club domestic league appearances and goals as of 27 May 2026 ‡ National team caps and goals as of 14:24, 26 May 2025 (UTC)

Carlos Domínguez Cáceres (born 11 February 2001) is a Spanish professional footballer who plays as a centre-back or left-back for Real Oviedo, on loan from RC Celta de Vigo.

== Career ==
A youth product of the RC Celta de Vigo academy, Domínguez was called up to join the senior team for the first time in early May 2021 due to a series of injuries in the first team. He made his professional debut with Celta Vigo in a 4–2 La Liga win over Villarreal CF on 9 May 2021.

On 11 January 2022, Domínguez renewed his contract with Celta until 2026. On 10 August 2025, he further extended his link until 2028.

On 11 August 2026, Domínguez was loaned to Segunda División side Real Oviedo, for one year.

== Career statistics ==
As of match played 22 March 2026

Appearances and goals by club, season and competition
Club	Season	League			Cup		Europe		Other		Total	
Club	Season	Division	Apps	Goals	Apps	Goals	Apps	Goals	Apps	Goals	Apps	Goals
Celta B	2020–21	Segunda División B	16	0	—		—		—		16	0
Celta B	2021–22	Primera División RFEF	18	0	—		—		—		18	0
Celta B	2022–23	Primera Federación	15	1	—		—		—		15	1
Celta B	Total		49	1	0	0	—		—		49	1
Celta	2020–21	La Liga	4	0	0	0	—		—		4	0
Celta	2021–22	La Liga	8	0	3	0	—		—		11	0
Celta	2022–23	La Liga	3	0	1	0	—		—		4	0
Celta	2023–24	La Liga	22	0	3	0	—		—		25	0
Celta	2024–25	La Liga	19	0	2	1	—		—		21	1
Celta	2025–26	La Liga	8	0	2	0	3 (Note: Appearances in UEFA Europa League)	0	—		13	0
Celta	Total		64	0	11	1	3	0	—		78	1
Career total			113	1	11	1	3	0	0	0	127	2
