= Iván Villar =

Spanish footballer (born 1997)

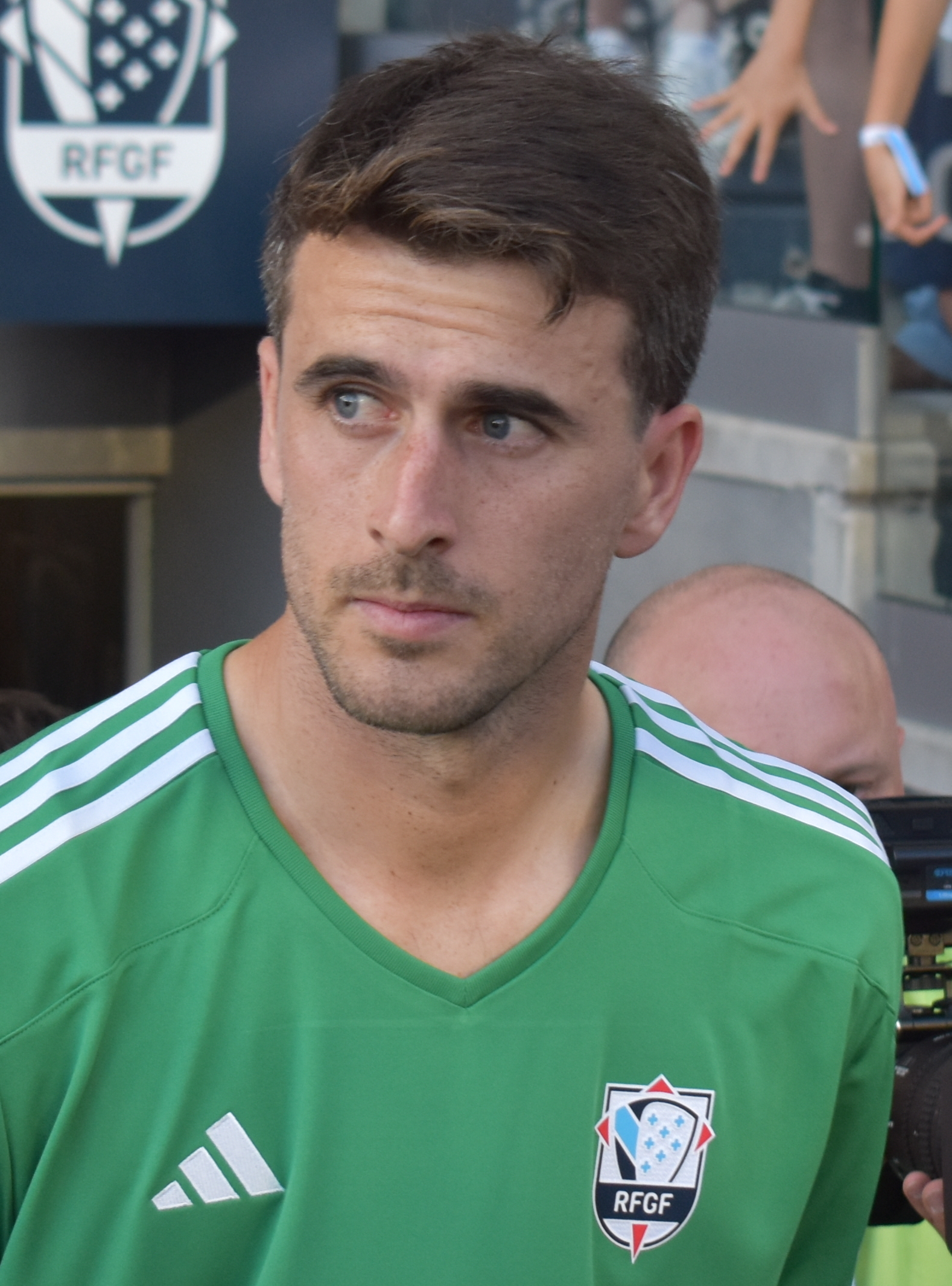
- Villar with Galicia in 2024

Personal information
- Full name: Iván Villar Martínez
- Date of birth: 9 July 1997 (age 29)
- Place of birth: Aldán, Spain
- Height: 1.83 m (6 ft 0 in)
- Position: Goalkeeper

Team information
- Current team: Celta
- Number: 25

Youth career
- Rápido Bahía
- 2008–2015: Celta

Senior career*
Years	Team	Apps	(Gls)
2013–2019	Celta B	83	(0)
2017–	Celta	61	(0)
2018	→ Levante (loan)	0	(0)
2021–2022	→ Leganés (loan)	10	(0)

International career
2013	Spain U17	2	(0)
2016	Spain U19	1	(0)
2024	Galicia	1	(0)
Medal record
Men's football
Representing Spain
Olympic Games
Silver medal – second place	2020	Team
- * Club domestic league appearances and goals as of 02:35, 25 September 2024 (UTC)

Iván Villar Martínez (born 9 July 1997) is a Spanish professional footballer who plays as a goalkeeper for La Liga club Celta de Vigo.

== Club career ==
Villar was born in Aldán, Pontevedra, Galicia, and joined RC Celta de Vigo's youth setup in 2008, from Rápido Bahía CF. On 13 October 2013, he made his senior debut with the reserves at the age of just 16, starting in a 1–0 Segunda División B home win against Cultural y Deportiva Leonesa.

On 4 September 2014, Villar extended his contract until 2019, but only featured regularly for the B side during the 2015–16 season. On 14 May 2017, he made his first-team – and La Liga – debut, starting in the 3–1 away loss to Deportivo Alavés.

In July 2017, Villar was definitely promoted to the main squad after refusing to play with the second team. The following 25 January, he extended his contract until 2023 and was immediately loaned to fellow top-division club Levante UD for six months.

At the start of the 2020–21 campaign, Villar was first choice under manager Óscar García, by virtue of being Celta's only fit goalkeeper. On 11 August 2021, he was loaned to Segunda División side CD Leganés for one year.

Villar began 2022–23 as backup to Agustín Marchesín, newly arrived from FC Porto. However, after the Argentine suffered a serious injury in February, he became the starter.

Villar returned to second-choice duties subsequently, being a reserve to Vicente Guaita first and Ionuț Radu later.

== Career statistics ==
As of match played 17 December 2025

Appearances and goals by club, season and competition
Club	Season	League			National Cup		Europe		Other		Total	
Club	Season	Division	Apps	Goals	Apps	Goals	Apps	Goals	Apps	Goals	Apps	Goals
Celta B	2013–14	Segunda División B	1	0	—		—		—		1	0
Celta B	2014–15	Segunda División B	1	0	—		—		—		1	0
Celta B	2015–16	Segunda División B	32	0	—		—		—		32	0
Celta B	2016–17	Segunda División B	12	0	—		—		1 (Note: Appearance in Segunda División B promotion play-offs)	0	13	0
Celta B	2018–19	Segunda División B	37	0	—		—		2 (Note: Appearances in Segunda División B relegation play-offs)	0	39	0
Celta B	Total		83	0	—		—		3	0	86	0
Celta	2016–17	La Liga	1	0	0	0	0	0	—		1	0
Celta	2017–18	La Liga	0	0	0	0	—		—		0	0
Celta	2018–19	La Liga	0	0	0	0	—		—		0	0
Celta	2019–20	La Liga	4	0	0	0	—		—		4	0
Celta	2020–21	La Liga	21	0	2	0	—		—		23	0
Celta	2022–23	La Liga	19	0	2	0	—		—		21	0
Celta	2023–24	La Liga	12	0	4	0	—		—		16	0
Celta	2024–25	La Liga	4	0	4	0	—		—		8	0
Celta	2025–26	La Liga	0	0	3	0	2 (Note: Appearances in UEFA Europa League)	0	—		5	0
Celta	Total		61	0	15	0	2	0	0	0	78	0
Levante (loan)	2017–18	La Liga	0	0	0	0	—		—		0	0
Leganés (loan)	2021–22	Segunda División	10	0	2	0	—		—		12	0
Career total			163	0	17	0	2	0	3	0	185	0

== Honours ==
Spain U23

- Summer Olympics silver medal: 2020
