= Vicente Guaita =

Spanish footballer

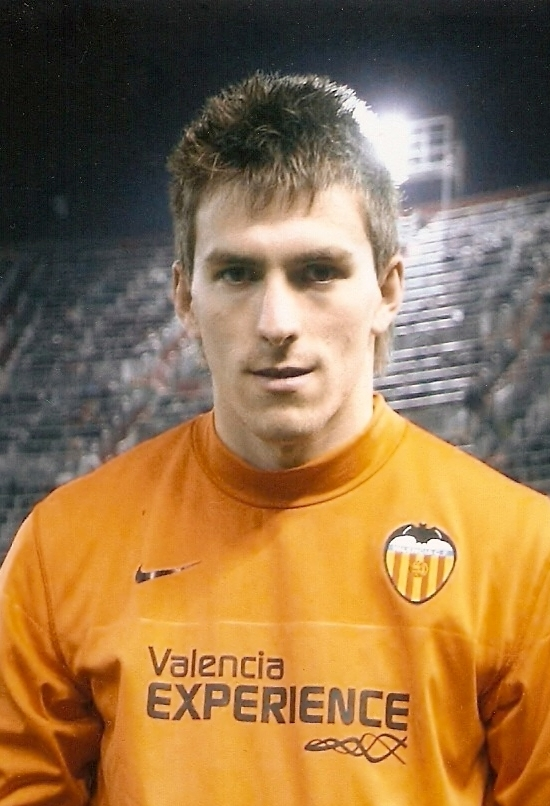
- Guaita with Valencia in 2009

Personal information
- Full name: Vicente Guaita Panadero
- Date of birth: 10 January 1987 (age 39)
- Place of birth: Torrent, Spain
- Height: 1.90 m (6 ft 3 in)
- Position: Goalkeeper

Youth career
- 1995–2000: Monte-Sión
- 2000–2006: Valencia

Senior career*
Years	Team	Apps	(Gls)
2006–2009	Valencia B	46	(0)
2008–2014	Valencia	76	(0)
2009–2010	→ Recreativo (loan)	30	(0)
2014–2018	Getafe	108	(0)
2018–2023	Crystal Palace	149	(0)
2023–2025	Celta	61	(0)
2025–2026	Parma	0	(0)
- * Club domestic league appearances and goals as of 18 January 2026

Vicente Guaita Panadero (Spanish pronunciation: [biˈθente ˈɣwajta panaˈðeɾo]; (Note: In isolation, Guaita is pronounced [ˈɡwajta].) born 10 January 1987) is a Spanish professional footballer who plays as a goalkeeper.

He appeared in 237 La Liga matches over ten seasons with Valencia, Getafe and Celta, as well as a season on loan to Recreativo in the Segunda División. In 2018, he signed with Premier League club Crystal Palace, totalling 154 appearances in five years.

== Career ==
=== Valencia ===
Born in Torrent, Valencian Community, Guaita graduated from the Valencia youth system after arriving there from CD Monte-sión at the age of 13, being promoted to the first team for the 2008–09 season following the retirement of longtime incumbent Santiago Cañizares. Additionally, as German Timo Hildebrand became ostracised by coach Unai Emery, he became the backup.

Guaita made his official debut with the main squad on 2 October 2008, in a UEFA Cup tie against Marítimo (2–1 home win). However, after the signing of veteran César Sánchez from Tottenham Hotspur later in the year and the full recovery of Renan, he remained third choice until the end of the campaign.

In 2009–10, with Sánchez having renewed his link a further year and the signing of Mallorca's Miguel Ángel Moyá, Guaita was deemed surplus to requirements and joined, on loan, Segunda División's Recreativo de Huelva. As the Andalusians finished comfortably in mid-table he was awarded the competition's Ricardo Zamora Trophy, with just 24 goals conceded in 30 appearances.

In November–December 2010, profiting from injuries to both César and Moyà, Guaita had a run of several matches for Valencia, notably a 2–1 home win against Almería in La Liga and a 1–1 draw away to Manchester United in the UEFA Champions League. On 2 April 2011, as he had established himself in the starting XI, he suffered the loss of his father due to a heart attack (aged only 46), prompting manager Emery to reinstate César between the posts for two games.

In May 2011, Guaita extended his contract with Valencia until 2015. He began the season as the starter, but picked up a serious hand injury in early November 2011, being nonetheless selected to several games by Emery as the reserve.

=== Getafe ===
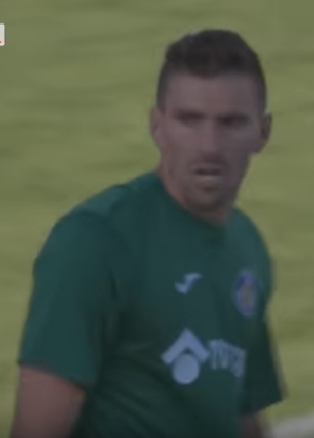
Guaita in 2016

On 31 July 2014, Guaita was sold to Getafe with a buy-back option. He made his debut for his new team on 24 August, in a 3–1 away loss to Celta.

In the 2016–17 campaign, with the club again in the second tier, Guaita played little due to injury. He was, however, the starter in the play-offs, which ended in promotion.

=== Crystal Palace ===
On 2 February 2018, Crystal Palace manager Roy Hodgson confirmed Guaita had agreed to join from 1 July on a free transfer. The transfer was reconfirmed by the club on 8 June, with the player agreeing to a three-year contract. He made his Premier League debut on 15 December, keeping a clean sheet in a 1–0 home win against Leicester City.

Guaita eventually became the starter, relegating Wayne Hennessey to the bench. On 1 February 2021, he extended his link until 30 June 2023, and in June was voted his team's player of the season.

In January 2023, Guaita signed a new deal until June 2024. However, during that summer, he reportedly refused to play for the side and demanded a transfer, having lost his starting place to Sam Johnstone. He later criticised the club on Twitter after not being included in the squad for Palace's first match of the new season against Sheffield United.

=== Celta ===
On 1 September 2023, aged 36, Guaita returned to his home country and signed a two-year contract with Celta. He quickly became first-choice over youth graduate Iván Villar, making 27 appearances in his first season.

=== Parma ===
On 22 November 2025, Guaita joined Parma of the Italian Serie A until the end of the campaign; this was due to Zion Suzuki's serious hand injury. Two months later, however, the contract was terminated by mutual consent.

== Career statistics ==
As of match played 24 May 2025

Appearances and goals by club, season and competition
Club	Season	League			National cup (Note: Includes Copa del Rey, FA Cup)		League cup (Note: Includes EFL Cup)		Europe		Other		Total	
Club	Season	Division	Apps	Goals	Apps	Goals	Apps	Goals	Apps	Goals	Apps	Goals	Apps	Goals
Valencia B	2006–07	Segunda División B	8	0	—		—		—		—		8	0
Valencia B	2007–08	Tercera División	28	0	—		—		—		—		28	0
Valencia B	2008–09	Segunda División B	10	0	—		—		—		—		10	0
Valencia B	Total		46	0	—		—		—		—		46	0
Valencia	2007–08	La Liga	0	0	0	0	—		0	0	—		0	0
Valencia	2008–09	La Liga	2	0	3	0	—		3 (Note: Appearances in UEFA Cup)	0	—		8	0
Valencia	2010–11	La Liga	21	0	3	0	—		4 (Note: Appearances in UEFA Champions League)	0	—		28	0
Valencia	2011–12	La Liga	26	0	2	0	—		2 (Note: Appearances in UEFA Europa League)	0	—		30	0
Valencia	2012–13	La Liga	14	0	5	0	—		6	0	—		25	0
Valencia	2013–14	La Liga	13	0	3	0	—		7	0	—		23	0
Valencia	Total		76	0	16	0	—		22	0	—		114	0
Recreativo (loan)	2009–10	Segunda División	30	0	1	0	—		—		—		31	0
Getafe	2014–15	La Liga	29	0	0	0	—		—		—		29	0
Getafe	2015–16	La Liga	38	0	0	0	—		—		—		38	0
Getafe	2016–17	Segunda División	8	0	0	0	—		—		4 (Note: Appearances in La Liga play-offs)	0	12	0
Getafe	2017–18	La Liga	33	0	0	0	—		—		—		33	0
Getafe	Total		108	0	0	0	—		—		4	0	112	0
Crystal Palace	2018–19	Premier League	20	0	1	0	3	0	—		—		24	0
Crystal Palace	2019–20	Premier League	35	0	0	0	0	0	—		—		35	0
Crystal Palace	2020–21	Premier League	37	0	0	0	0	0	—		—		37	0
Crystal Palace	2021–22	Premier League	30	0	0	0	0	0	—		—		30	0
Crystal Palace	2022–23	Premier League	27	0	1	0	0	0	—		—		28	0
Crystal Palace	Total		149	0	2	0	3	0	—		—		154	0
Celta	2023–24	La Liga	27	0	0	0	—		—		—		27	0
Celta	2024–25	La Liga	34	0	0	0	—		—		—		34	0
Celta	Total		61	0	0	0	—		—		—		61	0
Career total			470	0	19	0	3	0	22	0	4	0	518	0

== Honours ==
Getafe

- La Liga play-offs: 2017

Individual

- Ricardo Zamora Trophy (Segunda División): 2009–10
- Crystal Palace Player of the Year: 2020–21
