= Santi Mina =

Spanish footballer

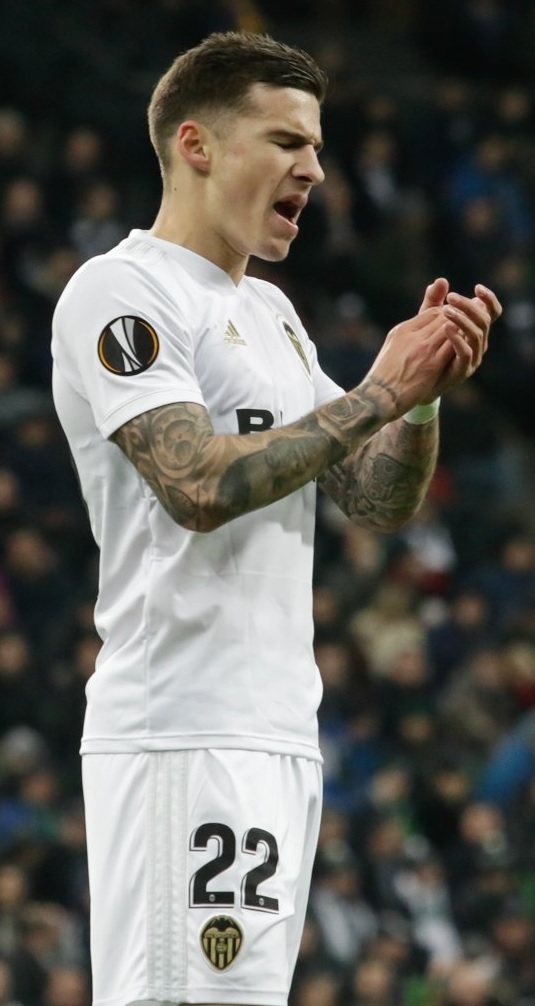
- Mina with Valencia in 2019

Personal information
- Full name: Santiago Mina Lorenzo
- Date of birth: 7 December 1995 (age 30)
- Place of birth: Vigo, Spain
- Height: 1.81 m (5 ft 11 1/2 in)
- Position: Forward

Youth career
- 2005–2012: Celta

Senior career*
Years	Team	Apps	(Gls)
2012–2013	Celta B	13	(8)
2013–2015	Celta	50	(9)
2015–2019	Valencia	117	(29)
2019–2023	Celta	101	(25)
2022–2023	→ Al Shabab (loan)	27	(6)

International career
2013	Spain U18	2	(1)
2013–2015	Spain U19	16	(6)
2015–2016	Spain U21	4	(2)
- * Club domestic league appearances and goals as of 12:25, 1 June 2023 (UTC)

Santiago "Santi" Mina Lorenzo (Spanish pronunciation: [sanˈtjaɣo ˈsanti ˈmina loˈɾenθo]; born 7 December 1995) is a Spanish former professional footballer who played as a forward.

He spent most of his career at Celta, totalling 163 games and 42 goals across two spells. He made 268 appearances and scored 63 goals in La Liga where he also represented Valencia, transferring there for €10 million and winning the Copa del Rey in 2019.

In 2022, Mina was sentenced to four years in prison for sexual abuse committed five years earlier.

== Club career ==
=== Celta ===
Born in Vigo, Galicia, Mina played youth football with his hometown club Celta de Vigo, and made his senior debut with the reserves in the 2012–13 season of Tercera División. On 5 January 2013, he signed a professional deal running until 2018.

Mina made his first-team – and La Liga – debut for them on 16 February 2013, coming on as a substitute for Iago Aspas in the 66th minute of a 3–1 away defeat against Getafe. He scored his first top-flight goal on 16 September, but in a 3–2 loss at Athletic Bilbao; at only 17 years, 9 months and 10 days, he became the side's youngest goalscorer in the first division.

On 11 April 2015, Mina scored four goals in a 6–1 home rout of Rayo Vallecano, becoming the youngest player in the last 80 years to do so in the Spanish top tier and the first from Celta since 1979.

=== Valencia ===
On 4 July 2015, Mina moved to fellow top-division team Valencia after agreeing to a six-year deal for a €10 million fee. He scored his first competitive goal for them on 5 December, netting four minutes from time in a 1–1 home draw against Barcelona.

On 18 February 2016, in only the first 45 minutes, Mina scored twice and provided three assists in a UEFA Europa League last-32 tie against Rapid Wien, in an eventual 6–0 win also at the Mestalla Stadium (the half-time result was a competition record).

Mina scored a career-best 12 league goals in 2017–18 as Valencia came fourth, despite being more often than not a substitute for Simone Zaza and Rodrigo; halfway through the campaign, the trio had 12 more goals than Real Madrid's "BBC" attacking line. The following season, he netted braces in Copa del Rey victories over Ebro (round of 32) and Sporting de Gijón (last 16) as his club picked up their first honour for 11 years, being unused in the 2–1 final defeat of Barcelona on 25 May 2019.

=== Return to Celta ===
After four years at Valencia, Mina returned to Celta on a five-year contract as Maxi Gómez moved in the opposite direction. In 2020–21, he scored 12 goals in partnership with Aspas' 14; this included both goals of a 2–1 win at Barcelona on 16 May to end that team's title hopes.

In July 2022, Celta reached an agreement to loan Mina to Aris Thessaloniki of Super League Greece, but the player refused the deal, as he did with Shabab Al Ahli from the United Arab Emirates. On 23 August, he joined the Saudi Pro League's Al Shabab on a one-year loan for a fee of €2.5 million and salary of €1 million. He scored on his debut as a substitute three days later, concluding a 3–0 home win over Al Batin.

Mina's contract was unilaterally terminated on 4 August 2023. The following month, he was close to a move to Serie B club Sampdoria, until the fans revolted over the news.

== Personal life ==
Mina's father, also named Santiago, was also a footballer. A defender, he played for several clubs in the 1970s and 1980s, including Celta.

In December 2019, Mina was charged with sexual assault relating to an incident in Mojácar two years earlier. He and his alleged accomplice, former Celta teammate David Goldar, were tried in March 2022. On 4 May, Mina was sentenced to four years in prison for sexual abuse, being found not guilty of the more serious offence due to lack of violence; he was ordered to pay €50,000 in compensation.

The judge found it proven that the victim had returned to the footballers' caravan to spend the night with Goldar, when Mina entered undressed and blocked the exit. He then penetrated her mouth with his genitalia and her genitalia with his fingers, causing injuries. While the victim's account was consistent, Mina's testimony varied and was different to that of Goldar. After his conviction, he was banished from Celta by club president Carlos Mouriño, who then reintegrated him into training as a paid employee until the end of the appeals process.

== Career statistics ==
As of match played 1 May 2022

Appearances and goals by club, season and competition
Club	Season	League			Copa del Rey		Continental		Other		Total	
Club	Season	Division	Apps	Goals	Apps	Goals	Apps	Goals	Apps	Goals	Apps	Goals
Celta	2012–13	La Liga	1	0	0	0	—		—		1	0
Celta	2013–14	La Liga	29	2	2	1	—		—		31	3
Celta	2014–15	La Liga	20	7	4	2	—		—		24	9
Celta	Total		50	9	6	3	—		—		56	12
Valencia	2015–16	La Liga	26	4	4	1	6 (Note: Four appearances in UEFA Champions League, two appearances and three goals in UEFA Europa League)	3	—		36	8
Valencia	2016–17	La Liga	29	6	2	0	—		—		31	6
Valencia	2017–18	La Liga	32	12	6	3	—		—		38	15
Valencia	2018–19	La Liga	30	7	5	4	10 (Note: Six appearances and two goals in UEFA Champions League, four appearances in UEFA Europa League)	2	—		45	13
Valencia	Total		117	29	17	8	16	5	—		150	42
Celta	2019–20	La Liga	34	6	2	2	—		—		36	8
Celta	2020–21	La Liga	34	12	1	1	—		—		35	13
Celta	2021–22	La Liga	33	7	3	2	—		—		36	9
Celta	Total		101	25	6	5	—		—		107	30
Career total			268	63	29	16	16	5	0	0	313	79

== Honours ==
Valencia

- Copa del Rey: 2018–19
