= Coke Carrillo =

Spanish footballer (born 2002)

Personal information
- Full name: Jorge Carrillo Balea
- Date of birth: 7 January 2002 (age 24)
- Place of birth: Poio, Spain
- Height: 1.88 m (6 ft 2 in)
- Position: Goalkeeper

Team information
- Current team: Celta B
- Number: 1

Youth career
- 2014–2018: Pontevedra
- 2018–2021: Barcelona

Senior career*
Years	Team	Apps	(Gls)
2021–2022	Barcelona B	0	(0)
2021–2022	→ Celta B (loan)	0	(0)
2022–	Celta B	60	(0)

International career
2019	Spain U18	2	(0)
- * Club domestic league appearances and goals as of 15 August 2026

Jorge "Coke" Carrillo Balea (born 7 January 2002) is a Spanish professional footballer who plays as a goalkeeper for RC Celta Fortuna.

== Club career ==
Born in Poio, Pontevedra, Galicia, Carrillo played for Pontevedra CF before joining FC Barcelona on 23 July 2018, initially for the Juvenil B squad. On 15 July 2021, after finishing his formation, he signed a three-year contract and was promoted to the reserves, but was loaned to RC Celta de Vigo's B-team on 31 August.

Carrillo spent the campaign as a third-choice in both Celta's first and reserve teams, but still signed a permanent five-year deal with the club on 3 August 2022. Initially behind Ruly García in the pecking order, he remained a backup in the B's after the arrival of Marc Vidal in the 2024–25 season, but still renewed his link until 2029 on 14 June 2025.

After Vidal's promotion to the first team, Carrillo became an undisputed starter for Fortuna, and contributed with 40 appearances overall during the campaign as the club achieved a first-ever promotion to Segunda División. He made his professional debut on 15 August 2026, starting in a 0–0 away draw against Cádiz CF.

== International career ==
In April 2018, Carrillo was called up to the Spain national under-16 team for a period of trainings. In December 2019, he was called up to the under-18s for the Algarve Tournament.
