= John Holsgrove =

English footballer

Personal information
- Date of birth: 25 September 1945 (age 81)
- Place of birth: Southwark, England
- Position: Central defender

Youth career
- –: Tottenham Hotspur
- ?–1964: Crystal Palace

Senior career*
Years	Team	Apps	(Gls)
1964–1965	Crystal Palace	18	(2)
1965–1971	Wolverhampton Wanderers	180	(7)
1971–1975	Sheffield Wednesday	104	(5)
1975–1976	Stockport County	9	(0)
–	Stalybridge Celtic	?	(?)
Total		311	(14)
- * Club domestic league appearances and goals

John Holsgrove (born 27 September 1945) is an English former professional footballer who played as a central defender. Active in the Football League between 1964 and 1976, Holsgrove made over 300 career appearances.

== Career ==
Holsgrove began his youth career at Tottenham Hotspur, as an amateur, before moving to Crystal Palace's junior programme. He signed professional terms in February 1964 and made 18 appearances in the Football League during the 1964–65 season, scoring twice. Holsgrove signed for Wolverhampton Wanderers in May 1965 and later played for Sheffield Wednesday and Stockport County, making a total of 311 appearances in the League. He also played non-League football for Stalybridge Celtic.

== Personal life ==
His three sons - Paul, Lee and Peter - were also all footballers, as is grandson Jordan (son of Paul).
