= Paul Holsgrove =

English footballer (born 1969)

Personal information
- Full name: Paul Holsgrove
- Date of birth: 26 August 1969 (age 57)
- Place of birth: Wellington, Shropshire, England
- Position: Midfielder

Senior career*
Years	Team	Apps	(Gls)
1987–1990	Aldershot	3	(0)
1990	Farnborough Town		
1990–1991	Wokingham Town		
1991	Luton Town	2	(0)
1991–1992	Heracles Almelo	21	(6)
1992–1994	Millwall	11	(0)
1994–1997	Reading	70	(6)
1997	→ Grimsby Town (loan)	10	(0)
1997–1998	Crewe Alexandra	8	(1)
1998	Stoke City	12	(1)
1998	Brighton & Hove Albion	0	(0)
1998–1999	Hibernian	17	(1)
1999	→ Airdrieonians (loan)	4	(0)
2000	Darlington	3	(0)
2000	Hayes	30	(0)
2000–01	Slough Town	32	(3)
2001	Windsor & Eton		
Total		223	(18)
- * Club domestic league appearances and goals

Paul Holsgrove (born 26 August 1969) is an English former professional footballer who played as a midfielder.

He played professional football from 1987 until 2001 and played in three countries, His native England, Netherlands and Scotland. Holsgrove played for Aldershot, Wokingham Town, Luton Town, Heracles Almelo, Millwall, Reading, Grimsby Town, Crewe Alexandra, Stoke City, Hibernian, Airdrieonians, Darlington, Hayes, Slough Town and Windsor & Eton.

== Career ==
Holsgrove was born in Wellington, Shropshire and began his career with Aldershot. He played for the Shots four times, after which he dropped into non-League, playing for Farnborough Town and Wokingham Town. Following failed trials at Wimbledon and West Bromwich Albion he joined Luton Town. Holsgrove only played twice for the Hatters in two seasons at Kenilworth Road and then decided to move to the Netherlands to play for Eerste Divisie side Heracles Almelo. Holsgrove played 21 times for "Heraclieden" scoring six goals for the 1991–92 season before returning to England. He joined Millwall in August 1993 where he played 15 times in 1992–93 but injury kept him out of the 1993–94 season. He joined Reading in August 1994 and played 29 times in 1994–95 scoring four goals. He played in 37 games in 1995–96 and 17 times in 1996–97 before finding himself out of the side in 1997–98. He joined Grimsby Town on loan playing in ten matches in two months.

He left Reading to join Crewe Alexandra on a non-contract basis in November 1997 and played nine times for the Alex before joining Stoke City in January 1998. He played 12 times for Stoke scoring once which came in a 1–1 draw with Ipswich Town on 7 February 1998. He left Stoke after they suffered relegation. In 1998 he moved to Scotland joining Hibernian playing 19 games scoring once. The season after he had a spell playing on loan for Airdrieonians. Paul moved back south of the border before the end of the season. He returned to England joining for Darlington. He then played for Hayes, Slough Town and Windsor & Eton.

== Personal ==
His father John Holsgrove and brothers Lee Holsgrove and Peter Holsgrove were also professional footballers.

His son, Jordan Holsgrove, has embarked on a career as a professional footballer. Jordan came through Reading's academy and U23 system, and he signed for Spanish club Celta Vigo in September 2020. Jordan was born in Edinburgh while his father played For Hibernian, and he has represented Scotland in youth internationals up to and including under-21.

== Career statistics ==
Appearances and goals by club, season and competition
Club	Season	League			FA Cup		League Cup		Other^{[A]}		Total	
Club	Season	Division	Apps	Goals	Apps	Goals	Apps	Goals	Apps	Goals	Apps	Goals
Aldershot	1985–86	Fourth Division	0	0	0	0	0	0	1	0	1	0
Aldershot	1986–87	Fourth Division	0	0	0	0	0	0	0	0	0	0
Aldershot	1987–88	Third Division	2	0	0	0	0	0	0	0	2	0
Aldershot	1988–89	Third Division	1	0	0	0	0	0	0	0	1	0
Luton Town	1990–91	First Division	1	0	0	0	0	0	0	0	1	0
Luton Town	1991–92	First Division	1	0	0	0	0	0	0	0	1	0
Heracles Almelo	1991–92	Eerste Divisie	21	6	0	0	0	0	0	0	21	6
Millwall	1992–93	First Division	11	0	1	0	1	0	2	0	15	0
Millwall	1993–94	First Division	0	0	0	0	0	0	0	0	0	0
Reading	1994–95	First Division	24	3	1	0	4	1	0	0	29	4
Reading	1995–96	First Division	30	1	2	0	5	0	0	0	37	1
Reading	1996–97	First Division	14	2	2	0	1	0	0	0	17	2
Reading	1997–98	First Division	2	0	0	0	1	0	0	0	3	0
Grimsby Town (loan)	1997–98	Second Division	10	0	0	0	0	0	0	0	10	0
Crewe Alexandra	1997–98	First Division	8	1	1	0	0	0	0	0	9	1
Stoke City	1997–98	First Division	12	1	0	0	0	0	0	0	12	1
Hibernian	1998–99	Scottish First Division	17	1	0	0	2	0	0	0	19	1
Airdrieonians	1999–2000	Scottish First Division	4	0	0	0	0	0	0	0	4	0
Darlington	1999–2000	Third Division	3	0	0	0	0	0	1	0	4	0
Darlington	2000–01	Third Division	0	0	0	0	0	0	0	0	0	0
Hayes	2001–02	Conference National	30	0	0	0	0	0	0	0	30	0
Career Total			191	15	7	0	14	1	4	0	216	16

A. The "Other" column constitutes appearances and goals in the Anglo-Italian Cup, Football League Trophy.
