= Trofeo Memorial Quinocho =

Quinocho Memorial Trophy Trofeo Memorial Quinocho
- Founded: 1995; 31 years ago
- Region: Vigo, Spain
- Teams: 2
- Current champions: (Spain) Celta Vigo (2023)
- Most championships: (Spain) Celta Vigo (21 titles)
- Broadcaster: Televisión de Galicia

The Quinocho Memorial Trophy (Spanish: Trofeo Memorial Quinocho) is an annual pre-season football competition hosted by Celta Vigo.

The trophy is dedicated to former Celta player and club director Joaquín Fernández Santomé 'Quinocho', who was killed in the clubhouse after confronting two masked thieves who were planning a robbery there.

== List of winners ==
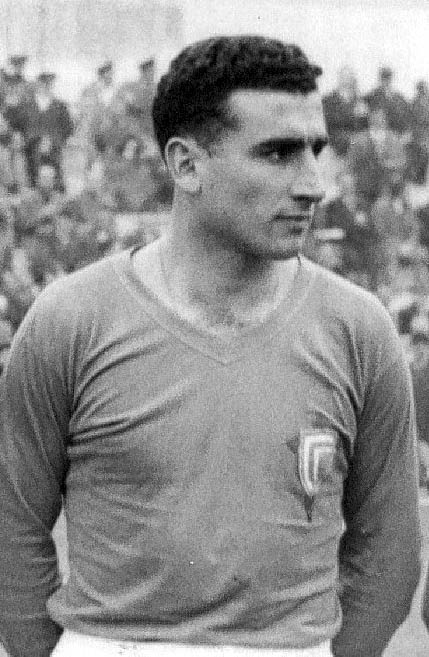
Joaquín Fernández Santomé 'Quinocho'

Ed.	Year	Winners	Score	Runners-up
1	1995	(Spain) Celta Vigo	2–0	(Spain) Compostela
2	1996	(Spain) Celta Vigo	2–1	(Spain) Athletic Bilbao
3	1997	(Portugal) Vitória	2–1	(Spain) Celta Vigo
4	1998	(Spain) Celta Vigo	2–0	(Spain) Real Betis
5	1999	(Spain) Celta Vigo	2–1	(Spain) Real Betis
6	2000	(Spain) Celta Vigo	1–1 (3–1 p)	(Italy) Roma
7	2001	(Spain) Celta Vigo	2–0	(Spain) Las Palmas
8	2002	(Spain) Celta Vigo	4–0	(Portugal) Vitória
9	2003	(Spain) Celta Vigo	2–2 (3–1 p)	(Greece) Olympiacos
10	2004	(Spain) Celta Vigo	3–2	(Portugal) Braga
11	2005	(Spain) Celta Vigo	2–0	(Portugal) Braga
12	2006	Cancelled due to poor pitch conditions		
13	2007	(Spain) Celta Vigo	3–1	(Portugal) Boavista
14	2008	(Spain) Celta Vigo	0–0 (5–4 p)	(Spain) Numancia
15	2009	(Spain) Celta Vigo	1–0	(Spain) Valladolid
16	2010	(Portugal) Paços de Ferreira	1–0	(Spain) Celta Vigo
17	2011	(Spain) Celta Vigo	2–1	(Portugal) Braga
18	2012	(Spain) Celta Vigo	1–0	(England) Wigan Athletic
19	2013	(Spain) Celta Vigo	0–0 (4–1 p)	(England) Southampton
20	2014	(Spain) Celta Vigo	4–0	(Italy) Cagliari
21	2015	(Spain) Celta Vigo	4–0	(Italy) Genoa
22	2016	(Spain) Celta Vigo	2–1	(Portugal) Braga
23	2017	(Italy) Udinese	1–1 (3–2 p)	(Spain) Celta Vigo
24	2018	(Germany) Mainz 05	2–1	(Spain) Celta Vigo
25	2019	(Italy) Lazio	2–1	(Spain) Celta Vigo
—	2020–21	Not held		
26	2022	(Spain) Celta Vigo	6–0	(Saudi Arabia) Al Shabab
27	2023	(Spain) Celta Vigo	1–0	(France) Lyon
