= Lee Holsgrove =

English footballer

Personal information
- Date of birth: 13 December 1979 (age 46)
- Place of birth: Wendover, England
- Height: 6 ft 2 in (1.88 m)
- Position: Defender

Senior career*
Years	Team	Apps	(Gls)
1997–1998	Millwall	0	(0)
1998–2000	Wycombe Wanderers	10	(0)
2000–2002	Aldershot Town	?	(?)
2002	→ Hayes (loan)	1	(0)
2002–2004	Hayes	?	(?)
2004	Windsor & Eton	?	(?)
Total		?	(?)
- * Club domestic league appearances and goals

Lee Holsgrove (born 13 December 1979) is an English former professional footballer who played as a defender.

== Career ==
Born in Wendover, Holsgrove played for Millwall, Wycombe Wanderers, Aldershot Town, Hayes and Windsor & Eton.

== Personal life ==
His father John and two brothers Paul and Peter were also all footballers.
