= Miguel Baeza (footballer) =

Spanish footballer (born 2000)

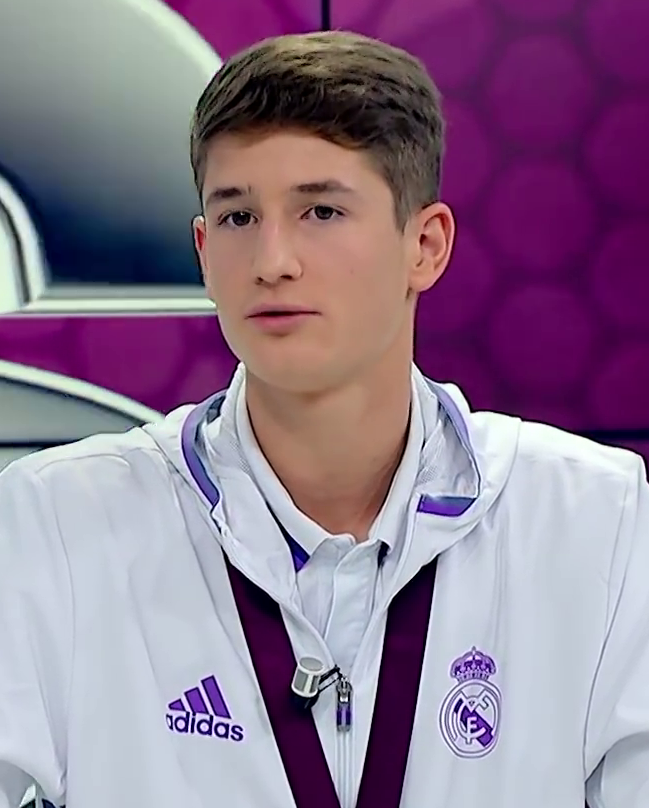
- Baeza with Real Madrid in 2017

Personal information
- Full name: Miguel Baeza Pérez
- Date of birth: 27 March 2000 (age 26)
- Place of birth: Córdoba, Spain
- Height: 1.77 m (5 ft 10 in)
- Position: Attacking midfielder

Team information
- Current team: Nacional
- Number: 8

Youth career
- 2006–2012: Séneca
- 2012–2019: Real Madrid

Senior career*
Years	Team	Apps	(Gls)
2019–2020	Real Madrid B	27	(9)
2020–2024	Celta	23	(1)
2022	→ Ponferradina (loan)	13	(0)
2022–2023	→ Rio Ave (loan)	22	(0)
2023–2024	→ Mirandés (loan)	7	(0)
2024–	Nacional	19	(2)

International career
2019	Spain U19	1	(0)
- * Club domestic league appearances and goals as of 25 May 2026

Miguel Baeza Pérez (born 27 March 2000) is a Spanish professional footballer for Primeira Liga club Nacional. Mainly an attacking midfielder, he can also play as a left winger.

== Club career ==
=== Real Madrid ===
Born in Córdoba, Andalusia, Baeza joined Real Madrid's La Fábrica in 2012, from hometown side Séneca CF. On 6 January 2019, while still a junior, he made his senior debut with the reserves by starting in a 3–0 Segunda División B away loss against Pontevedra CF.

Definitely promoted to the B-side for the 2019–20 season, Baeza scored his first senior goal on 31 August 2019, netting his team's third in a 3–1 home win against Marino de Luanco. The following 26 January, he scored a hat-trick in a 3–1 home success over SCR Peña Deportiva.

=== Celta ===
On 15 August 2020, Baeza moved straight to La Liga after agreeing to a five-year contract with RC Celta de Vigo, for a rumoured fee of €2.5 million for 50% of his federative rights. He made his debut for the club on 12 September, coming on as a second-half substitute for Brais Méndez in a 0–0 away draw against SD Eibar. On 29 November, he scored his first professional goal in a 3–1 home win over Granada CF.

Baeza was loaned to Segunda División side SD Ponferradina on 6 January 2022 for the remainder of the season. On 31 August the same year, hemoved abroad for the first time in his career, joining Primeira Liga side Rio Ave F.C. on a one-year loan deal.

On 31 August 2023, Baeza was loaned to CD Mirandés in the second division for the 2023–24 season. Upon returning, he terminated his link with Celta on 12 July 2024.

=== Nacional ===
On 16 July 2024, Baeza joined Portuguese Primeira Liga club Nacional on a one-year deal.

== Career statistics ==
As of 2 January 2021

Appearances and goals by club, season and competition
Club	Season	League			Cup		Continental		Other		Total	
Club	Season	Division	Apps	Goals	Apps	Goals	Apps	Goals	Apps	Goals	Apps	Goals
Real Madrid Castilla	2018–19	Segunda División B	1	0	0	0	–		0	0	1	0
Real Madrid Castilla	2019–20	Segunda División B	26	9	0	0	–		0	0	26	9
Real Madrid Castilla	Total		27	9	0	0	0	0	0	0	27	9
Celta de Vigo	2020–21	La Liga	13	1	1	0	0	0	0	0	14	1
Career total			40	10	1	0	0	0	0	0	41	10
