= 2021 Copa Federación de España =

Tournament details
- Country: Spain
- Teams: 32 (in national phase)

Final positions
- Champions: Córdoba (1st title)
- Runners-up: Guijuelo

Tournament statistics
- Matches played: 31
- Goals scored: 69 (2.23 per match)
- Top goal scorer(s): Simo Bouzaidi; Julen Huidobro; José Ángel Giráldez (3 goals)

The 2021 Copa Federación de España was the 29th edition of the Copa Federación de España, also known as Copa RFEF, a knockout competition for Spanish football clubs.

The competition began in August with the first games of the regional stages and ended in November with the final of the national tournament. As part of the new competition format started in 2019, the four semifinalists qualified for the Copa del Rey first round.

== Regional tournaments ==
=== Andalusia tournament ===
The Royal Andalusian Football Federation (RFAF) decided to create the 'Copa RFAF' in 2020. The finalists of this competition were selected as the Andalusian representatives in the Copa Federación national phase. The tournament started on August 22.

Quarter-finals
22 and 29 August
Utrera (5) | 0 | 1 | 1
Ciudad de Lucena (5) | 1 | 1 | 2
22 and 29 August
Puente Genil (5) | 0 | 2 | 2
Xerez (5) | 3 | 1 | 4
22 and 29 August
Torreperogil (5) | 0 | 1 | 1
Torredonjimeno (5) | 0 | 2 | 2
22 and 29 August
Juventud Torremolinos (5) | 1 | 2 | 3
El Palo (5) | 0 | 1 | 1

Semi-finals
3 September – Marbella
Ciudad de Lucena (5) | 0
Xerez (5) | 2
3 September – Marbella
Torredonjimeno (5) | 1
Juventud Torremolinos (5) | 3

Final
5 September – Marbella
Xerez (5) | 2
Juventud Torremolinos (5) | 3

==== Final ====
| 5 September | Xerez (5) | 2–3 | Juventud Torremolinos (5) | Marbella |
| 12:00 | Juan Sánchez 25'; Rubén Jurado 89' | Report | Daniel Fernández 48'; Francisco Javier López 61'; Antonio Cerezo 67' | Stadium: Estadio Municipal; Referee: Viñolo Payán |

=== Aragon tournament ===
Eight teams joined the tournament: Barbastro (5), Belchite 97 (5), Binéfar (5), Borja (5), Calamocha (5), Cuarte (5), Ejea (4) and Utebo (5). The group phase started 11 August.

==== Group 1 ====
| Pos | Team | Pld | W | D | L | GF | GA | GD | Pts | Qualification | EJE | CAL | UTE | BOR |
|---|---|---|---|---|---|---|---|---|---|---|---|---|---|---|
| 1 | Ejea | 3 | 2 | 0 | 1 | 5 | 3 | +2 | 6 | Qualification to the final | — | 1–2 | 2–0 | – |
| 2 | Calamocha | 3 | 2 | 0 | 1 | 4 | 3 | +1 | 6 | | – | — | 0–1 | — |
| 3 | Utebo | 3 | 2 | 0 | 1 | 2 | 2 | 0 | 6 | | – | — | — | 1–0 |
| 4 | Borja | 3 | 0 | 0 | 3 | 2 | 5 | −3 | 0 | | 1–2 | 1–2 | — | — |

Updated to match(es) played on 22 August 2021. Source: Federación Aragonesa de Fútbol

==== Group 2 ====
| Pos | Team | Pld | W | D | L | GF | GA | GD | Pts | Qualification | BAR | BIN | BEL | CUA |
|---|---|---|---|---|---|---|---|---|---|---|---|---|---|---|
| 1 | Barbastro | 3 | 2 | 1 | 0 | 7 | 4 | +3 | 7 | Qualification to the final | — | 2–2 | 1–0 | — |
| 2 | Binéfar | 3 | 1 | 2 | 0 | 5 | 4 | +1 | 5 | | — | — | — | 2–1 |
| 3 | Belchite 97 | 3 | 0 | 2 | 1 | 2 | 3 | −1 | 2 | | – | 1–1 | — | — |
| 4 | Cuarte | 3 | 0 | 1 | 2 | 2 | 3 | −1 | 1 | | 2–4 | — | 1–1 | — |

Updated to match(es) played on 22 August 2021. Source: Federación Aragonesa de Fútbol

==== Final ====
| 29 August | Barbastro (5) | 1–2 | Ejea (4) | Barbastro |
| 19:30 | Marc Guilas 87' | Report | Álex Sánchez 40' (pen.); Mata 90+3' | Stadium: Municipal |

=== Asturias tournament ===
12 teams joined the competition. The draw was made August 2 and the tournament started August 7. The semifinals and final were played between August 28 and September 8 at the same venue.

| Pot 1 | Pot 2 | Pot 3 |
|---|---|---|
| Caudal^{TH} (5); Marino Luanco (4); Lealtad (5); Covadonga (5) | Avilés (4); Llanes (5); San Martín (5); L'Entregu (5) | Tuilla (5); Gijón Industrial (5); Lenense (5); Urraca (5) |

==== Group stage ====
===== Group A =====
| Pos | Team | Pld | W | D | L | GF | GA | GD | Pts | Qualification | LEA | URR | SMA |
|---|---|---|---|---|---|---|---|---|---|---|---|---|---|
| 1 | Lealtad | 4 | 2 | 2 | 0 | 4 | 2 | +2 | 8 | Qualification to semifinals | — | 1–0 | 0–0 |
| 2 | Urraca | 4 | 1 | 2 | 1 | 2 | 2 | 0 | 5 | | 1–1 | — | 1–0 |
| 3 | San Martín | 4 | 0 | 2 | 2 | 1 | 3 | −2 | 2 | | 1–2 | 0–0 | — |

Updated to match(es) played on 25 August 2021. Source: Fútbol Asturiano

===== Group B =====
| Pos | Team | Pld | W | D | L | GF | GA | GD | Pts | Qualification | LLA | TUI | COV |
|---|---|---|---|---|---|---|---|---|---|---|---|---|---|
| 1 | Llanes | 4 | 3 | 1 | 0 | 9 | 2 | +7 | 10 | Qualification to semifinals | — | 2–0 | 4–0 |
| 2 | Tuilla | 4 | 1 | 2 | 1 | 4 | 5 | −1 | 5 | | 2–2 | — | 1–0 |
| 3 | Covadonga | 4 | 0 | 1 | 3 | 1 | 7 | −6 | 1 | | 0–1 | 1–1 | — |

Updated to match(es) played on 25 August 2021. Source: Fútbol Asturiano

===== Group C =====
| Pos | Team | Pld | W | D | L | GF | GA | GD | Pts | Qualification | AVI | MAR | GIJ |
|---|---|---|---|---|---|---|---|---|---|---|---|---|---|
| 1 | Avilés | 4 | 2 | 2 | 0 | 4 | 0 | +4 | 8 | Qualification to semifinals | — | 2–0 | 2–0 |
| 2 | Marino Luanco | 4 | 1 | 2 | 1 | 5 | 3 | +2 | 5 | | 0–0 | — | 4–0 |
| 3 | Gijón Industrial | 4 | 0 | 2 | 2 | 1 | 7 | −6 | 2 | | 0–0 | 1–1 | — |

Updated to match(es) played on 25 August 2021. Source: Fútbol Asturiano

===== Group D =====
| Pos | Team | Pld | W | D | L | GF | GA | GD | Pts | Qualification | CAU | ENT | LEN |
|---|---|---|---|---|---|---|---|---|---|---|---|---|---|
| 1 | Caudal | 4 | 2 | 2 | 0 | 2 | 0 | +2 | 8 | Qualification to semifinals | — | 0–0 | 1–0 |
| 2 | L'Entregu | 4 | 2 | 1 | 1 | 6 | 1 | +5 | 7 | | 0–1 | — | 3–0 |
| 3 | Lenense | 4 | 0 | 1 | 3 | 0 | 7 | −7 | 1 | | 0–0 | 0–3 | — |

Updated to match(es) played on 25 August 2021. Source: Fútbol Asturiano

==== Knockout stage ====
The knockout stage matches were played at Estadio Sergio Sánchez, in El Berrón, Siero.

Semi-finals
28 August – Siero
Lealtad (5) | 0
Llanes (5) | 1
29 August – Siero
Avilés (4) | 3
Caudal (5) | 1

Final
8 September – Siero
Llanes (5) | 1 (3)
Avilés (4) (p) | 1 (4)

==== Final ====
| 8 September | Llanes (5) | 1–1 (3–4 p) | Avilés (4) | Siero |
| 18:00 | Adrián 28' | Report | Kilian Grant (penalty missed) 45' 88'; Natalio (penalty missed) 90+2' | Stadium: Sergio Sánchez; Attendance: 500; Referee: Fernández Pérez |

=== Balearic Islands tournament ===
Formentera (4), Peña Deportiva (4), Platges de Calvià (5), Poblense (5) and Sant Jordi (5) joined the tournament.

First round
14 August
Sant Jordi (5) | 2
Formentera (4) | 5

Semi-finals
25 August
Platges de Calvià (5) | 2
Poblense (5) | 0
21 August
Formentera (4) | 1 (4)
Peña Deportiva (4) (p) | 1 (5)

Final
1 September
Platges de Calvià (5) | 0
Peña Deportiva (4) | 5

==== Final ====
| 1 September | Platges de Calvià (5) | 0–5 | Peña Deportiva (4) | Calviá |
| 16:00 | | Report | Víctor Calarge 40'; Lucas Alcázar 45'; Nacho López 56'; Sergi Torres 81'; Joan Piera 90' | Stadium: Municipal de Magaluf |

=== Basque Country tournament ===
Leioa was directly selected by the Basque Football Federation.

=== Canary Islands tournament ===
Tenisca (5) and Unión Viera (5) joined the tournament.

| 15 September | Tenisca (5) | 3–0 | Unión Viera (5) | Santa Cruz de La Palma |
| 17:30 | Dani López 16' (pen.); Chema 81'; Matías Dumpierre 90' | Report | | Stadium: Virgen de las Nieves |

| 2 October | Unión Viera (5) | 2–1 | Tenisca (5) | Las Palmas de Gran Canaria |
| 12:00 | | | | Stadium: Estadio Alfonso Silva |

=== Cantabria tournament ===
Eight teams joined the tournament. All matches were played at El Malecón stadium, in Torrelavega.

Quarter-finals
21 August
Tropezón (4) | 1 (4)
Cartes (5) (p) | 1 (5)
22 August
Gimn. Torrelavega (5) | 3
Textil Escudo (5) | 0
21 August
Laredo (4) | 1 (1)
Selaya (5) (p) | 1 (3)
22 August
Escobedo (5) | 3
Vimenor (5) | 1

Semi-finals
28 August
Cartes (5) | 0
Gimn. Torrelavega (5) | 2
29 August
Selaya (5) | 1 (2)
Escobedo (5) (p) | 1 (4)

Final
15 September
Gimn. Torrelavega (5) | 4
Escobedo (5) | 0

==== Final ====
| 15 September | Gimnástica Torrelavega (5) | 4–0 | Escobedo (5) | Torrelavega |
| 19:00 | Carlos Tobar 34'; Dani Álvarez 58'; Basurto 60'; Nacho Altadill 89' | Report | Laro (penalty missed) 44' | Stadium: El Malecón; Attendance: 700; Referee: Bárcena Ruíz |

=== Castile-La Mancha tournament ===
Ten teams joined the XX Trofeo Junta de Comunidades de Castilla-La Mancha. Atlético Albacete, as a reserve team (of Albacete Balompié), could not qualify for the national stage.

First round
7 August
Torrijos (5) | 0 (4)
Manchego (5) (p) | 0 (5)
7 August
Guadalajara (5) | 4
Tarancón (5) | 0

Quarter-finals
15 August
Manchego (5) | 1
Villarrubia (5) | 0
14 August
Guadalajara (5) | 0
Toledo (4) | 1
8 August
Quintanar del Rey (5) | 1 (2)
Villarrobledo (5) (p) | 1 (4)
15 August
Socuéllamos (4) | 0
Atlético Albacete (5) | 2

Semi-finals
22 August
Manchego (5) | 1 (3)
Toledo (4) (p) | 1 (4)
21 August
Villarrobledo (5) | 2 (3)
Atlético Albacete (5) (p) | 2 (4)

Final
25 August
Toledo (4) (p) | 0 (5)
Atlético Albacete (5) | 0 (4)

==== Final ====
| 25 August | Toledo (4) | 0–0 (5–4 p) | Atlético Albacete (5) | Toledo |
| 20:00 | | Report | | Stadium: Salto del Caballo |

=== Castile and León tournament ===
Six teams joined the tournament. Burgos Promesas, as reserve team, can not qualify for the national stage.

Quarter-finals
8 September
Ribert (5) | 2
Guijuelo (5) (a.e.t.) | 3
8 September
Arandina (5) | 0
Palencia CF (5) | 1

Semi-finals
15 September
Guijuelo (5) | 2
Salamanca (4) | 0
15 September
Palencia CF (5) | 1
Burgos Promesas (4) | 2

Final
22 September
Guijuelo (5) | 0
Burgos Promesas (4) | 2

==== Final ====
| 22 September | Guijuelo (5) | 0–2 | Burgos Promesas (4) | Guijuelo |
| 19:00 | | | | Stadium: Estadio Municipal Luis Ramos |

Guijuelo qualifies to National Phase because Burgos Promesas is the reserve team of Burgos.

=== Catalonia tournament ===
Lleida Esportiu (4) and Sant Andreu (5) joined the tournament.

| 15 September | Lleida Esportiu (4) | 3–1 | Sant Andreu (5) | Lleida |
| 20:00 | Adri Pladevall 39'; Bagayoko 47'; Quim Araujo 83' (pen.) | Report | Albertito 29' | Stadium: Camp d'Esports; Referee: Alins Rodríguez |

| 22 September | Sant Andreu (5) | 0–3 | Lleida Esportiu (4) | Barcelona |
| 20:00 | | | | Stadium: Narcís Sala |

=== Ceuta tournament ===
Betis de Hadú was directly selected by Federación de Fútbol de Ceuta due to sporting merits.

=== Extremadura tournament ===
13 teams joined the tournament.

First round
8 August
Plasencia (5) (p) | 0 (5)
Coria (4) | 0 (4)
8 August
Badajoz B (5) (p) | 1 (3)
Olivenza (5) | 1 (1)
8 August
Villafranca (5) | 1
Aceuchal (5) | 0
8 August
Trujillo (5) (p) | 1 (4)
Miajadas (5) | 1 (3)
8 August
Don Álvaro (5) | 1 (8)
Arroyo (5) (p) | 1 (9)

Quarter-finals
15 August
Plasencia (5) | 0
Moralo (5) | 3
15 August
Badajoz B (5) (p) | 0 (5)
Jerez (5) | 0 (3)
14 August
Villafranca (5) | 3
Llerenense (5) | 0
15 August
Trujillo (5) (p) | 0 (4)
Arroyo (5) | 0 (1)

Semi-finals
22 August
Moralo (5) | 4
Badajoz B (5) | 0
21 August
Villafranca (5) (p) | 0 (4)
Trujillo (5) | 0 (3)

Final
28 August - Cáceres
Moralo (5) | 2
Villafranca (5) | 0

==== Final ====
| 28 August | Moralo (5) | 2–0 | Villafranca (5) | Cáceres |
| 19:30 | Christian 34'; Juanpe 63' | Report | | Stadium: Príncipe Felipe |

=== Galicia tournament ===
A total of 15 teams joined the regional phase of the RFEF Cup for the 2021/2022 season.

First round
-
Racing Villalbés (5)
Viveiro (5) (w.o.)
-
Somozas (5) (w.o.)
Silva (5)
13 August
Estradense (5) (a.e.t.) (p) | 0 (5)
Arzúa (5) | 0 (3)
7 August
Alondras (5) (a.e.t.) (p) | 0 (3)
Pontevedra (4) | 0 (2)
-
Ourense CF (5) (w.o.)
Barco (5)
8 August
Arosa (4) | 0
Rápido Bouzas (5) | 2
7 August
Choco (5) | 1
Coruxo (4) (a.e.t.) | 2

Quarter-finals
-
Viveiro (5)
Somozas (5) (w.o.)
18 August
Estradense (5) (a.e.t.) | 1
Compostela (4) | 0
15 August
Alondras (5) (a.e.t.) (p) | 1 (5)
Ourense CF (5) | 1 (4)
14 August
Rápido Bouzas (5) | 2
Coruxo (4) | 1

Semi-finals
1 September
Somozas (5) | 3
Estradense (5) | 1
21 August
Alondras (5) (a.e.t.) (p) | 1 (4)
Rápido Bouzas (5) | 1 (1)

Final
5 September - A Estrada
Somozas (5) | 0
Alondras (5) (a.e.t.) | 1

==== Final ====
| 5 September | Somozas (5) | 0–1 (a.e.t.) | Alondras (5) | A Estrada |
| 17:30 | | Report | Jesús Varela 118' | Stadium: Municipal; Attendance: 350; Referee: Estévez Blanco |

=== La Rioja tournament ===
Eight teams joined the tournament.

Quarter-finals
22 August
Yagüe (5) | 0
Alfaro (5) | 3
21 August
La Calzada (5) | 1
Berceo (5) | 0
22 August
Atlético Vianés (5) | 0
Varea (5) | 1
22 August
Casalarreina (5) | 4
Cenicero (5) | 0

Semi-finals
29 August
Alfaro (5) (p) | 0 (4)
La Calzada (5) | 0 (2)
28 August
Varea (5) | 1 (2)
Casalarreina (5) (p) | 1 (4)

Final
5 September - Logroño
Alfaro (5) | 2
Casalarreina (5) | 0

==== Final ====
| 5 September | Alfaro (5) | 2–0 | Casalarreina (5) | Logroño |
| 18:00 | Álex Aguado 70'; Álvaro López 88' | Report | | Stadium: Mundial 82 |

=== Madrid tournament ===
Copa Real Federación Madrileña de Fútbol (RFFM) was one stage of the qualifying tournament. The winner of Copa RFFM qualified to the semifinals with Las Rozas (5), Móstoles URJC (4) and Navalcarnero (4). 8 teams joined Copa RFFM, starting August 15: Alcorcón B (5), Carabanchel (5), Fuenlabrada B (5), Moratalaz (5), Parla (5), Pozuelo (5), Rayo Vallecano B (5) and Torrejón (5).

==== Group 1 ====
| Pos | Team | Pld | W | D | L | GF | GA | GD | Pts | Qualification | TOR | CAR | POZ | PAR |
|---|---|---|---|---|---|---|---|---|---|---|---|---|---|---|
| 1 | Torrejón | 3 | 2 | 1 | 0 | 8 | 5 | +3 | 7 | Qualification to the final | — | 2–2 | — | — |
| 2 | Carabanchel | 3 | 1 | 2 | 0 | 3 | 2 | +1 | 5 | | — | — | — | 1–0 |
| 3 | Pozuelo | 3 | 1 | 1 | 1 | 4 | 5 | −1 | 4 | | 2–4 | 0–0 | — | — |
| 4 | Parla | 3 | 0 | 0 | 3 | 2 | 5 | −3 | 0 | | 1–2 | — | 1–2 | — |

Updated to match(es) played on 22 August 2021. Source: Real Federación de Futbol de Madrid

==== Group 2 ====
| Pos | Team | Pld | W | D | L | GF | GA | GD | Pts | Qualification | FUE | ALC | MOR | RAY |
|---|---|---|---|---|---|---|---|---|---|---|---|---|---|---|
| 1 | Fuenlabrada B | 3 | 2 | 1 | 0 | 7 | 3 | +4 | 7 | Qualification to the final | — | — | 2–1 | 4–1 |
| 2 | Alcorcón B | 3 | 1 | 2 | 0 | 7 | 4 | +3 | 5 | | 1–1 | — | 3–0 | — |
| 3 | Moratalaz | 3 | 1 | 0 | 2 | 4 | 7 | −3 | 3 | | — | – | — | 3–2 |
| 4 | Rayo Vallecano B | 3 | 0 | 1 | 2 | 6 | 10 | −4 | 1 | | — | 3–3 | – | — |

Updated to match(es) played on 22 August 2021. Source: Real Federación de Futbol de Madrid

==== Final Copa RFFM ====
| 29 August | Torrejón | 1–1 (4–5 p) | Fuenlabrada B | Madrid |
| 11:00 | | | | Stadium: García de la Mata |

As Fuenlabrada B is a reserve team and cannot qualify to national stage, Torrejón continues in the tournament.

==== Final Knockout stage ====
Semi-finals
8 September
Móstoles URJC (4) | 0
Navalcarnero (4) | 1
8 September
Las Rozas (5) | 2
Torrejón (5) | 0

Final
22 September
Navalcarnero (4) | 3
Las Rozas (5) | 0

==== Final ====
| 22 September | Navalcarnero (4) | 3–0 | Las Rozas (5) | Navalcarnero |
| 19:00 | | | | Stadium: Estadio Mariano González |

=== Melilla tournament ===
Melilla was directly selected by Real Federación Melillense de Fútbol due to sporting merits.

=== Murcia tournament ===
Four teams joined the tournament.

Semi-finals
8 and 15 September
Bullense (5) | 1 | 2 | 3
Yeclano (5) (p) | 1 | 2 | 3
8 and 15 September
Huércal-Overa (5) (p) | 0 | 2 | 2
Los Garres (5) | 1 | 1 | 2

Final
22 September - Bullas
Yeclano (5) | 1
Huércal-Overa (5) | 0

==== Final ====
| 22 September | Yeclano (5) | 1–0 | Huércal-Overa (5) | Bullas |
| 20:00 | | | | Stadium: Nicolás de las Peñas |

=== Navarre tournament ===
Eight teams joined the tournament.

Quarter-finals
25 August
Izarra (4) | 4
Valle de Egüés (5) | 1
25 August
Itaroa Huarte (5) | 3
Beti Kozkor (5) | 4
25 August
Cortes (5) | 0 (1)
Ardoi (4) (p) | 0 (4)
25 August
Mutilvera (4) | 2
Atlético Cirbonero (5) | 0

Semi-finals
1 September
Izarra (4) | 1
Beti Kozkor (5) | 0
1 September
Ardoi (4) | 5
Mutilvera (4) | 3

Final
8 September - Puente la Reina
Izarra (4) | 3
Ardoi (4) | 1

==== Final ====
| 8 September | Izarra (4) | 3–1 | Ardoi (4) | Puente la Reina |
| 19:00 | Juan Antonio Cabrera 44' (pen.); Ramos 63'; Alonso 85' | Report | Ibai Armendáriz 89' | Stadium: Osabidea |

=== Valencian Community tournament ===
8 teams joined the tournament.

Quarter-finals
8 September
Silla (5) | 1
Roda (5) | 2
8 September
Olímpic (5) | 0 (0)
Torrent (5) (p) | 0 (3)
8 September
Benigànim (5) | 2
Intercity (4) | 0
8 September
Callosa (5) | 1 (3)
Atzeneta (5) (p) | 1 (5)

Semi-finals
15 September
Roda (5) | 1
Torrent (5) | 0
15 September
Benigànim (5) | 2
Atzeneta (5) | 3

Final
22 September - L'Eliana
Roda (5) | 0 (5)
Atzeneta (5) (p) | 0 (6)

==== Final ====
| 22 September | Roda (5) | 0–0 (5–6 p) | Atzeneta (5) | L'Eliana |
| 18:30 | | Report | | Stadium: Poliesportiu |

== National phase ==
National phase was played between October and December with 32 teams (20 winners of the Regional Tournaments and the best 12 teams of 2020-21 Segunda División B not qualified to 2021–22 Copa del Rey). The four semifinalists qualified to 2021–22 Copa del Rey's first round.

=== Qualified teams ===
Best teams from 2020–21 Segunda División B not qualified to 2021–22 Copa del Rey

- (Basque Country (autonomous community)) Arenas de Getxo (4)
- (Andalusia) Córdoba (4)
- (Catalonia) Costa Brava (3)
- (Aragon) Ebro (4)
- (Valencian Community) Hércules (4)
- (Asturias) Langreo (4)
- (Andalusia) Linense (3)
- (Extremadura) Mérida (4)
- (Region of Murcia) Murcia (4)
- (Castile and León) Numancia (4)
- (Cantabria) Racing Santander (3)
- (Extremadura) Villanovense (4)

Winners of Autonomous Communities tournaments

- (La Rioja) Alfaro (5)
- (Galicia (Spain)) Alondras (5)
- (Valencian Community) Atzeneta (5)
- (Asturias) Avilés (4)
- (Ceuta) Betis de Hadú (6)
- (Aragon) Ejea (4)
- (Cantabria) Gimnásica Torrelavega (5)
- (Castile and León) Guijuelo (5)
- (Navarre) Izarra (4)
- (Andalusia) Juventud Torremolinos (5)
- (Basque Country (autonomous community)) Leioa (5)
- (Catalonia) Lleida Esportiu (4)
- Melilla (4)
- (Extremadura) Moralo (5)
- (Community of Madrid) Navalcarnero (4)
- (Balearic Islands) Peña Deportiva (4)
- (Canary Islands) Tenisca (5)
- (Castilla–La Mancha) Toledo (4)
- (Andalusia) Xerez (5)
- (Region of Murcia) Yeclano (5)

=== Draw ===
The draw for the entire tournament was made at the RFEF headquarters on September 24. The teams were divided into four pots based on geographical criteria. Each pot was played independently until the semi-finals.

| Pot A | Pot B | Pot C | Pot D |
|---|---|---|---|
| (Asturias) Avilés (4) (Asturias) Langreo (4) (Basque Country (autonomous community)) Arenas de Getxo (4) (Basque Country (autonomous community)) Leioa (5) (Cantabria) Gimnástica Torrelavega (5) (Cantabria) Racing Santander (3) (Galicia (Spain)) Alondras (5) (La Rioja) Alfaro (5) | (Canary Islands) Tenisca (5)^{†} (Castile and León) Guijuelo (5) (Castile and León) Numancia (4) (Castilla–La Mancha) Toledo (4) (Extremadura) Mérida (4) (Extremadura) Moralo (5) (Extremadura) Villanovense (4) (Community of Madrid) Navalcarnero (4) | (Aragon) Ebro (4) (Aragon) Ejea (4) (Balearic Islands) Peña Deportiva (4) (Catalonia) Costa Brava (3) (Catalonia) Lleida Esportiu (4) (Navarre) Izarra (4) (Valencian Community) Atzeneta (5) (Valencian Community) Hércules (4) | (Andalusia) Córdoba (4) (Andalusia) Juventud Torremolinos (5) (Andalusia) Linense (3) (Andalusia) Xerez (5) (Ceuta) Betis de Hadú (6); Melilla (4) (Region of Murcia) Murcia (4) (Region of Murcia) Yeclano (5) |

- † The identity of this team was unknown at the time of the draw

=== Bracket ===
Round of 32
6 October
Yeclano (5) | 3
Melilla (4) | 2
6 October
Murcia (4) | 0
Xerez (5) | 1
6 October
Betis de Hadú (6) | 0
Juv. Torremolinos (5) | 5
6 October
Linense (3) | 1
Córdoba (4) | 3
6 October
Ebro (4) | 1
Hércules (4) | 0
6 October
Costa Brava (3) | 2 (4)
Izarra (4) (p) | 2 (5)
6 October
Atzeneta (5) | 0
Peña Deportiva (4) | 2
6 October
Lleida Esportiu (4) | 3
Ejea (4) | 0
6 October
Langreo (4) | 0
Avilés (4) | 1
6 October
Racing Santander (3) | 2
Arenas de Getxo (4) | 1
6 October
Gim. Torrelavega (5) | 1
Alfaro (5) | 0
6 October
Leioa (5) | 1
Alondras (5) | 0
6 October
Guijuelo (5) (a.e.t.) | 2
Toledo (4) | 1
6 October
Navalcarnero (4) (a.e.t.) | 2
Villanovense (4) | 1
6 October
Numancia (4) | 0
Mérida (4) (a.e.t.) | 1
6 October
Moralo (5) | 2
Tenisca (5) | 1

Round of 16
13 October
Yeclano (5) | 0
Xerez (5) | 2
13 October
Juv. Torremolinos (5) | 1
Córdoba (4) | 2
13 October
Ebro (4) | 1
Izarra (4) | 0
13 October
Peña Deportiva (4) | 0
Lleida Esportiu (4) | 1
13 October
Avilés (4) | 0
Racing Santander (3) (a.e.t.) | 3
13 October
Gim. Torrelavega (5) | 0
Leioa (5) | 4
13 October
Guijuelo (5) | 2
Navalcarnero (4) | 1
13 October
Mérida (4) | 0
Moralo (5) | 2

Quarter-finals
27 October
Xerez (5) | 0
Córdoba (4) | 1
27 October
Ebro (4) (p) | 0 (5)
Lleida Esportiu (4) | 0 (4)
27 October
Racing Santander (3) | 1
Leioa (5) | 2
27 October
Guijuelo (5) | 1
Moralo (5) | 0

Semi-finals
10 November
Córdoba (4) | 1
Ebro (4) | 0
10 November
Leioa (5) | 1
Guijuelo (5) | 2

Final
23 November
Córdoba (4) | 1
Guijuelo (5) | 0

=== Round of 32 ===
Pot A

| 6 October | Langreo (4) | 0–1 | Avilés (4) | Langreo |
| 19:30 | | Report | Sergio García 56' | Stadium: Ganzábal; Attendance: 500; Referee: Cueto Amigo |

| 6 October | Racing Santander (3) | 2–1 | Arenas de Getxo (4) | Santander |
| 19:00 | Marco Camus 2'; Manu Justo 44' | Report | Ian Uranga 30' | Stadium: El Sardinero; Attendance: 2.235; Referee: Ramo Andrés |

| 6 October | Gimnástica Torrelavega (5) | 1–0 | Alfaro (5) | Torrelavega |
| 19:45 | Hugo Vitienes 48' | Report | | Stadium: El Malecón; Referee: García Arriola |

| 6 October | Leioa (5) | 1–0 | Alondras (5) | Leioa |
| 19:30 | Julen Huidobro 56' | Report | | Stadium: Sarriena; Referee: Aranda Bujedo |

Pot B

| 6 October | Guijuelo (5) | 2–1 (a.e.t.) | Toledo (4) | Guijuelo |
| 19:00 | | | | Stadium: Municipal |

| 6 October | Navalcarnero (4) | 2–1 (a.e.t.) | Villanovense (4) | Navalcarnero |
| 19:00 | | | | Stadium: Mariano González |

| 6 October | Numancia (4) | 0–1 (a.e.t.) | Mérida (4) | Soria |
| 19:30 | | | | Stadium: Los Pajaritos |

| 6 October | Moralo (5) | 2–1 | Tenisca (5) | Navalmoral de la Mata |
| 20:30 | | | | Stadium: Municipal |

Pot C

| 6 October | Ebro (4) | 1–0 | Hércules (4) | Zaragoza |
| 17:00 | | | | Stadium: La Almozara |

| 6 October | Costa Brava (3) | 2–2 (a.e.t.) (4–5 p) | Izarra (4) | Palamós |
| 20:00 | | | | Stadium: Palamós Costa Brava |

| 6 October | Atzeneta (5) | 0–2 | Peña Deportiva (4) | Atzeneta d'Albaida |
| 17:00 | | | | Stadium: El Regit |

| 6 October | Lleida Esportiu (4) | 3–0 | Ejea (4) | Lleida |
| 20:00 | | | | Stadium: Camp d'Esports |

Pot D

| 6 October | Yeclano (5) | 3–2 | Melilla (4) | Yecla |
| 20:15 | | | | Stadium: La Constitución |

| 6 October | Murcia (4) | 0–1 | Xerez (5) | Murcia |
| 20:30 | | | | Stadium: Nueva Condomina |

| 6 October | Betis de Hadú (6) | 0–5 | Juventud Torremolinos (5) | Ceuta |
| 18:00 | | | | Stadium: Alfonso Murube |

| 6 October | Linense (3) | 1–3 | Córdoba (4) | La Línea de la Concepción |
| 17:00 | | | | Stadium: Municipal |

=== Round of 16 ===
Pot A

| 13 October | Avilés (4) | 0–3 (a.e.t.) | Racing Santander (3) | Avilés |
| 20:00 | | | | Stadium: Román Suárez Puerta |

| 13 October | Gimnástica Torrelavega (5) | 0–4 | Leioa (5) | Torrelavega |
| 20:00 | | | | Stadium: El Malecón |

Pot B

| 13 October | Guijuelo (5) | 2–1 | Navalcarnero (4) | Guijuelo |
| 19:00 | Giráldez 56', 59' | Report | Beneit 45' | Stadium: Municipal; Attendance: 300; Referee: Valdés Díaz |

| 13 October | Mérida (4) | 0–2 | Moralo (5) | Mérida |
| 20:30 | | | Buben 15'; Andoni 29' | Stadium: Estadio Romano; Attendance: 1.350; Referee: Maté Rincón |

Pot C

| 13 October | Ebro (4) | 1–0 | Izarra (4) | Zaragoza |
| 17:00 | Nando Quesada (penalty missed) 17'; Álex Altube 90+4' | Report | | Stadium: La Almozara; Attendance: 200; Referee: Rezola Etxeberria |

| 13 October | Peña Deportiva (4) | 0–1 | Lleida Esportiu (4) | Santa Eulària des Riu |
| 17:00 | | Report | Moha Keita 39' | Stadium: Municipal |

Pot D

| 13 October | Yeclano (5) | 0–2 | Xerez (5) | Yecla |
| 20:15 | | Report | Rubén Jurado 45'; Iván Gutiérrez 78' | Stadium: La Constitución; Referee: Moreno Osuna |

| 13 October | Juventud Torremolinos (5) | 1–2 | Córdoba (4) | Torremolinos |
| 20:00 | Javi López 2' | Report | Antonio Casas 18'; Simo Bouzaidi 86' | Stadium: El Pozuelo; Attendance: 1.500; Referee: Amar Ahmed |

=== Quarter-finals ===
Winners qualified to the 2021–22 Copa del Rey first round.

Pot A

| 27 October | Racing Santander (3) | 1–2 | Leioa (5) | Santander |
| 19:00 | Manu Justo 29' | Report | Marcos Yániz 23'; Luisma 38' (pen.) | Stadium: El Sardinero; Attendance: 3.243; Referee: Sesma Espinosa |

Pot B

| 27 October | Guijuelo (5) | 1–0 | Moralo (5) | Guijuelo |
| 19:00 | Álex Caramelo 45+1' | Report | | Stadium: Municipal |

Pot C

| 27 October | Ebro (4) | 0–0 (a.e.t.) (5–4 p) | Lleida Esportiu (4) | Zaragoza |
| 16:30 | | Report | | Stadium: La Almozara; Referee: Legarra Gorgoñón |

Pot D

| 27 October | Xerez (5) | 0–1 | Córdoba (4) | Jerez de la Frontera |
| 20:30 | | Report | Simo Bouzaidi 28' | Stadium: Pedro S. Garrido; Attendance: 2.000; Referee: Aranda Delgado |

=== Semi-finals ===
| 10 November | Córdoba (4) | 1–0 | Ebro (4) | Córdoba |
| 20:30 | Luismi 75' | Report | | Stadium: Nuevo Arcángel; Attendance: 5.500; Referee: Delfa Ramos |

| 10 November | Leioa (5) | 1–2 | Guijuelo (5) | Leioa |
| 19:30 | Marcos Yániz 24' | Report | José Giráldez 13'; Cristóbal Gil 82' | Stadium: Sarriena; Attendance: 400; Referee: Sáiz Pérez |

=== Final ===
| 23 November | Córdoba (4) | 1–0 | Guijuelo (5) | Córdoba |
| 18:30 | Javi Flores 54' | | | Stadium: Nuevo Arcángel |

=== Top goalscorers ===
| Rank | Player | Team | Goals |
|---|---|---|---|
| 1 | (Morocco) Bouzaidi | Córdoba | 3 |
| 1 | (Spain) Huidobro | Leioa | 3 |
| 1 | (Spain) Giráldez | Guijuelo | 3 |
| 3 | (Spain) Sagüés | Izarra | 2 |
| 3 | (Spain) Tonete | Yeclano | 2 |
| 3 | (Spain) Gato | Juventud Torremolinos | 2 |
| 3 | (Spain) Camús | Racing Santander | 2 |
| 3 | (Senegal) Moha Keita | Lleida | 2 |
| 3 | (Spain) Casas | Córdoba | 2 |
| 3 | (Spain) Justo | Racing Santander | 2 |
| 3 | (Spain) Villa | Leioa | 2 |
