= Luciano Reigosa =

Spanish footballer

Personal information
- Full name: Luciano Reigosa Martín
- Date of birth: 26 September 1901
- Place of birth: Vigo, Galicia, Spain
- Date of death: 30 November 1977 (aged 76)
- Position: Midfielder

Senior career*
Years	Team	Apps	(Gls)
1920–1923	Fortuna de Vigo		
1923–1933	Celta de Vigo		

International career
1922–1923	Galicia		
Medal record
Men's football
Galicia
Prince of Asturias Cup
Silver medal – second place	1922–23 Prince of Asturias Cup	Team
- * Club domestic league appearances and goals

Luciano Reigosa Martín (26 September 1901 – 30 November 1977) was a Spanish footballer who played as a midfielder for Celta de Vigo. The dates of his birth and death are unknown. He is best known for being part of the first-ever team fielded by Celta de Vigo in 1923, and remained loyal to the club in its first decade of existence, until 1933.

== Club career ==
Born in Vigo, he spent most of his career at his hometown club Fortuna de Vigo, playing for them until 1923, when it was merged with Real Vigo Sporting, in what was the birth of Celta de Vigo. On 11 March 1923, Reigosa played in the last match that was held between these two rivals, which the fortunistas lost 0–1. The presentation match of Celta de Vigo was held at Coia on 16 September 1923, in a meeting between A and B teams, taking advantage of the large pool that they had following the merger, and Reigosa was one of the 11 footballers that lined-up for the A team.

Reigosa was an exceptional right winger and one of the most regular footballers in Celta's early years. On 10 April 1924, he played a friendly match for Celta against the Uruguay national team who went on to win the 1924 Summer Olympics in Paris. Together with Polo Pardo, the Clemente brothers (Juanito, Balbino), Ramón González, he was part of the newly founded Celta team that won three Galician Championships in a row between 1923 and 1926. On 30 December 1928, Reigosa was part of another historic Celta line-up, the one which inaugurated the Balaídos Stadium, in a match that ended in a 7–0 trashing of Real Unión of Irún, with Reigosa assisting the opening goal netted by the Canarian left winger Graciliano.

Reigosa remained loyal to Celta in the first ten seasons of the club's history. Ten seasons in which he always showed himself to be one of the most regular footballers up front on the team, scoring goals and assisting his teammates at the forefront. On 26 June 1932, the city of Vigo paid tribute to Luciano Reigosa in Balaidos, with a match against Deportivo de La Coruña, a match that Celta won 1–0, courtesy of Valcarcel.

== International career ==
Like many other Fortuna de Vigo players of his time, he was eligible to play for the Galicia national team several times. On 7 January 1923, he scored his only goal for Galicia in a friendly match against a Lisbon XI in a 3–1 win at Coia. Together with Luis Otero, Jacobo Torres, Balbino, Chiarroni, and Polo Pardo, he was a member of the Galician team that reached the final of the 1922–23 Prince of Asturias Cup, an inter-regional competition organized by the RFEF.

== Honours ==
=== Club ===
Fortuna de Vigo

- Galician Championship:
  - Winners (2) 1920–21 and 1921–22

Celta de Vigo

- Galician Championship:
  - Winners (3) 1923–24, 1924–25 and 1925–26

=== International ===
Galicia

- Prince of Asturias Cup:
  - Runner-up (1): 1922–23
