= Siareiros Galegos =

Group of fans of the Galician national football team, born in the mid-1990s

Siareiras Galegos (or Siareir@s Galeg@s) is a group of fans of the Galician national football team, born in the mid-1990s.

Galician flag including Kingdom of Galicia's coat of arms

== History ==
Nationalist Galician flag, also called Bandeira da Pátria or Estreleira

Siareiras Galegas began in December 2005, with the resurrection of the Galician football team at a match against Uruguay after 69 years of prohibition. It was generally viewed as a success by Galician supporters. Siareiras Galegas held a great demonstration supporting the officiality of the Galician national team, attended by at least 2,000 people all around the streets of A Coruña. This became a kind of tradition, and every year the collective holds demonstrations coinciding with every match of the Galician national team. It is conformed by hundreds of supporters, and participates actively in political movements sometimes.

== Performance ==
Their football songs usually have a strong political charge, as they are officially Galician nationalists. Galician bagpipes and percussion usually go with them, as they show flags of Galicia, flags of the Kingdom of Galicia and coats of the Galician kings. They have taken to the stadiums flags of the Celtic nations or simply Scottish and Irish flags, considering these as friendly countries.

=== Matches organized by Siareiros Galegos ===
26 December 2009 Friendly	Galician XI (Galicia (Spain))	9–0	Club Deportivo Paraguayo	Santiago de Compostela
				Stadium: Santa Isabel

23 December 2010 Friendly	Galician XI (Galicia (Spain))	6–3	(Palestine) Palestinian XI	Ourense
				Stadium: Os Remedios

23 December 2011 Friendly	Galician XI (Galicia (Spain))	2–1	Western Sahara	Teo
				Stadium: Cacherias

29 December 2012 Friendly	Galician XI (Galicia (Spain))	3–2	Kurdistan Region	Pontevedra
				Stadium: A Xunqueira

28 December 2013 Friendly	Galician XI (Galicia (Spain))	1–7	Occitania	Lugo
20:00	(?)	Report	Massaré 21', 59'; Bertini 29', 32', 49', 83'; Congré 85'	Stadium: O Polvorín; Attendance: 600

26 December 2015 Friendly	Galician XI (Galicia (Spain))	1–0	(Senegal) Senegalese XI	Santiago de Compostela
				Stadium: Santa Isabel
