= Galician Socialist Union =

Galician Socialist Union Unión Socialista Galega
- Leader: Xohán Xesús González
- Founded: 1932
- Dissolved: 1933
- Newspaper: Amañecer
- Ideology: Galician nationalism Marxism; Left-wing nationalism Republicanism; Galician independence
- Colors: Red , white and blue

Party flag

The Galician Socialist Union (USG, Unión Socialista Galega in Galician language) was a Galician nationalist and Marxist party founded in August 1932 by Xohán Xesús González a prominent militant of the UGT and a member of the Seminary of Socialist Studies.

== History ==
At first it had only implementation in the region of Santiago. It had Amañecer as its official magazine (published biweekly). In the elections of November 1933 presented candidates in all provinces as independent (Xohán Xesús González for A Coruña, Siervo González Rivas for Lugo, Jesús Núñez Rodríguez by Ourense and Francisco Guimarey for Pontevedra) and shared rallies with the Partido Galeguista candidates. Dissolved after the electoral failure and the triumph of the right, the USG merged with the Republican Left. In 1936 several of the party members were killed by the Francoist forces, including almost all their leadership. The USG was the historical and ideological antecedent of the Marxist and Galician nationalist parties that appeared in Galiza in the 60s. A lot of the USG members were supporters of the independence of Galiza, including their leader Xohán Xesús González.
