= Juanito Clemente =

Spanish footballer

Juanito
Personal information
- Full name: Juan Clemente Núñez
- Date of birth: Unknown
- Place of birth: Vedra, Galicia, Spain
- Date of death: 22 August 1936
- Position: Defender

Senior career*
| Years | Team | Apps | (Gls) |
| 1917–1923 | Fortuna de Vigo | | |
| 1923–1926 | Celta de Vigo | | |

International career
| 1923 | Galicia | | |
- * Club domestic league appearances and goals

Juan Clemente Núñez, better known as Juanito, was a Spanish footballer who played as a defender. His brother Balbino was also a defender. He was a member of the first-ever team fielded by Celta de Vigo in 1923.

== Club career ==
Born in Vedra, Galicia, he began his career with his hometown club Fortuna de Vigo in 1917, with whom he won two Galician Championships in 1920-21 and 1921-22, playing for them until 1923, when it was merged with Real Vigo Sporting to form Celta de Vigo. Juanito played in the last match that was held between these two rivals on 11 March 1923, which the fortunistas lost 0–1. The presentation match of Celta de Vigo was held at Coia on 16 September 1923, in a meeting between an A and a B team formed with the players from the club, taking advantage of the large team available that they had, and Juanito was the captain of the B team (some sources say it was his brother). With Vigo, he formed a great defensive back-line with Pasarín, Otero and his brother, Balbino. Despite being a defender, he reached good goalscoring numbers, mainly by converting penalties. Juanito's most important goals were the one he scored against Eiriña CF in the last match of Celta's first-ever Galician Championship in 1923-24, or the two he scored against Boca Juniors in one of the two friendlies that Celta played in their 1925 European tour in Vigo. On 10 April 1924, he captained Celta in a friendly match against the Uruguay national team that would go on to win the 1924 Summer Olympics in Paris. He was a pivotal role in Celta's three back-to-back Galician Championship titles with between 1923 and 1926, before retiring at the end that season.

== International career ==
Being a player of Fortuna de Vigo, he was summoned to play for the Galicia national team a few times, playing against a team of a British Navy squad and against a Lisbon XI in 1923.

== Honours ==
=== Club ===
Fortuna de Vigo

Galician Championship:

- Winners (2) 1920-21 and 1921-22

Celta de Vigo

Galician Championship:

- Winners (3) 1923-24, 1924-25 and 1925-26
