= Val do Dubra =

Concello de Val do Dubra
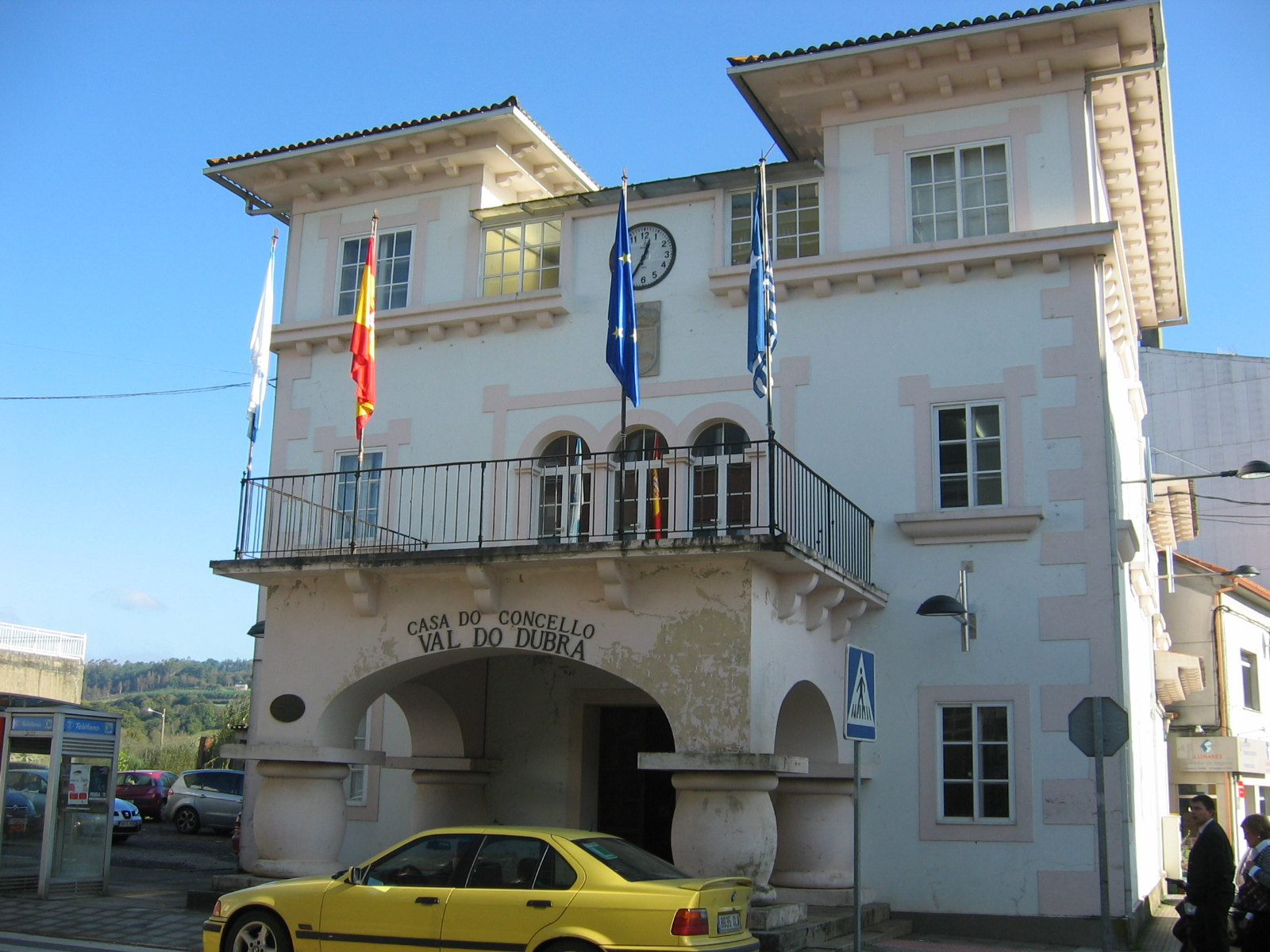

- Coat of arms
- Nickname: Val do Dubra
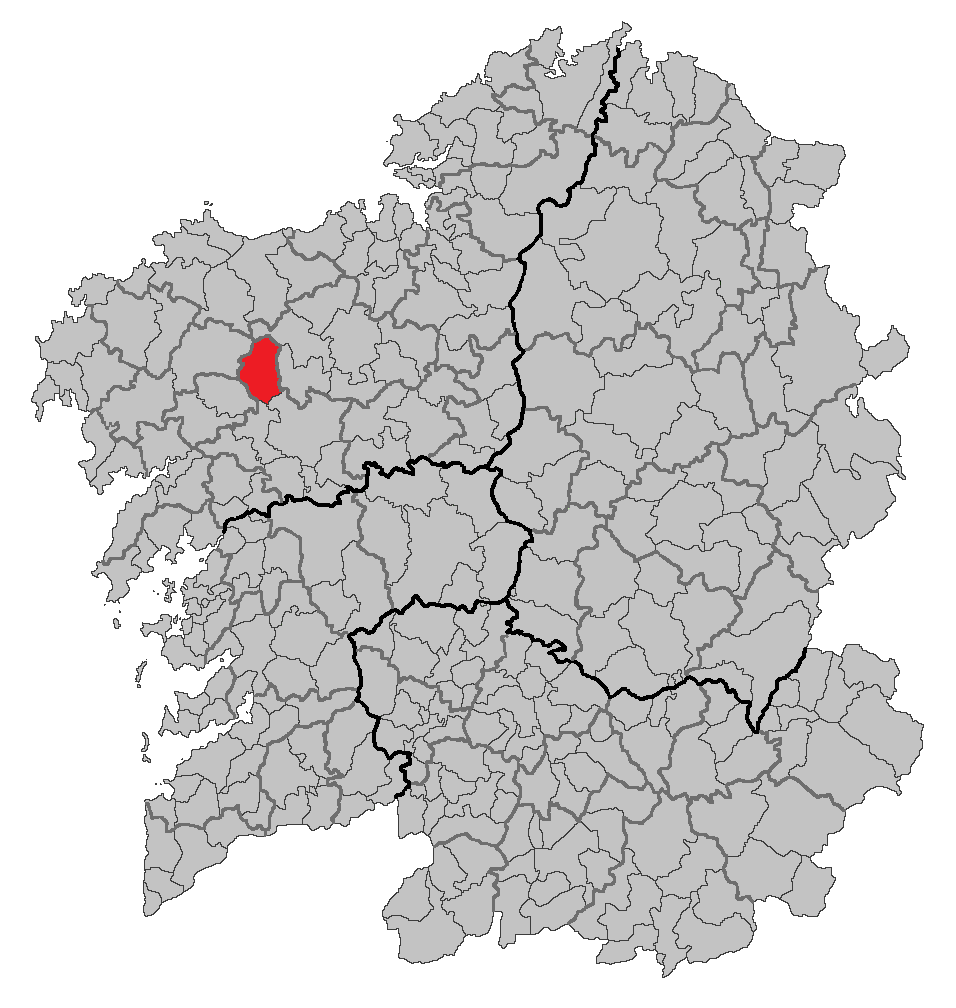
- Location of Val do Dubra within Galicia
- Coordinates: 43.0225°N 8.6383°W
- Country: Spain

Government
  - Alcalde (Mayor): Diego Luis Díaz Méndez (PSdeG-PSOE)

Area
  - Total: 109.02 km^{2} (42.09 sq mi)

Population (2025-01-01)
  - Total: 3,680
  - Density: 33.8/km^{2} (87.4/sq mi)
- Time zone: UTC+1 (CET)
  - Summer (DST): UTC+2 (CEST)
- Website: http://valdodubra.gal/

Val do Dubra is a municipality in the autonomous community of Galicia in northwestern Spain in the Province of A Coruña. It belongs to the comarca of Santiago.

In the municipality, the Abelenda stream—a short affluent river of the Dubra river—is born. The population in 2007 was 4515 people according to the Municipal Register of Inhabitants (4720 in 2003).

== Parishes ==
Parishes as part of the municipality:

- Arabexo (Santa Maria)
- Bembibre (San Salvador)
- Buxán (Santiago)
- Coucieiro (San Martín)
- Erbiñou (San Cristóbal)
- Niveiro (San Vicente)
- Paramos (Santa María)
- Portomeiro (San Cosme)
- Portomouro (San Cristóbal)
- Rial (San Vicente)
- San Román (Santa Maria)
- Vilariño (San Pedro)

== See also ==
List of municipalities in A Coruña
