= Quique Fornos =

Spanish footballer

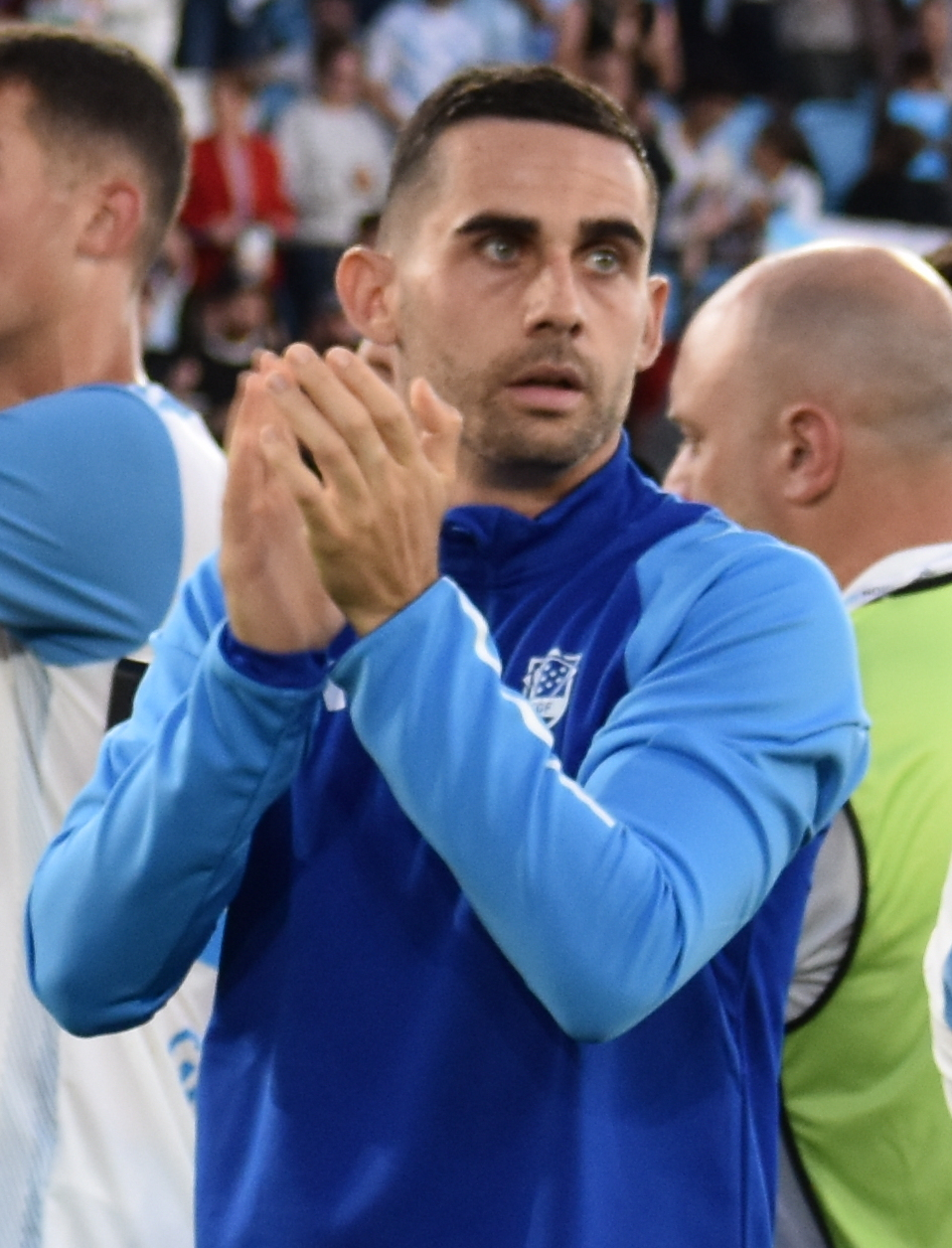
- Fornos with Galicia in 2024

Personal information
- Full name: Enrique Fornos Domínguez
- Date of birth: 1 January 1997 (age 29)
- Place of birth: As Pontes, Spain
- Height: 1.81 m (5 ft 11 1/2 in)
- Position: Centre back

Team information
- Current team: Huesca

Youth career
- 2010–2016: Deportivo La Coruña

Senior career*
| Years | Team | Apps | (Gls) |
| 2013 | Deportivo La Coruña | 0 | (0) |
| 2014–2019 | Deportivo B | 108 | (2) |
| 2019–2023 | Racing Ferrol | 93 | (2) |
| 2023–2026 | Cultural Leonesa | 77 | (3) |
| 2026– | Huesca | 0 | (0) |

International career
| 2014 | Spain U17 | 1 | (0) |
| 2024 | Galicia | 1 | (0) |
- * Club domestic league appearances and goals as of 31 May 2026

Enrique 'Quique' Fornos Domínguez (born 1 January 1997) is a Spanish footballer who plays as a central defender for SD Huesca.

== Club career ==
Born in As Pontes, Galicia, Fornos was a youth product of Deportivo de La Coruña. He made his debuts as a senior with the reserves, representing the side in the fourth division.

Fornos made his official debut for the Galicians' first team on 17 August 2013, playing the last 33 minutes in a 2–2 draw against Córdoba CF for that season's Copa del Rey; he also was one of the youngest players to debut with Depor 's first team, with only 16 years old. He would resume his career at the club playing for the Juvenil and reserve teams, helping in the latter's promotion to Segunda División B in 2017.

On 17 April 2019, Fornos was presented as a new player of fourth tier side Racing de Ferrol. He achieved promotion to the third level in his first season, being regularly used afterwards.

On 15 July 2023, after helping Racing in their promotion to Segunda División, Fornos joined Cultural y Deportiva Leonesa in Primera Federación on a one-year deal. He also helped the side to a promotion to division two in 2025, now as a first-choice.

On 5 June 2026, after suffering relegation with Cultu, Fornos moved to SD Huesca, also relegated to the third tier, on a two-year deal.
