= Balbino Clemente =

Spanish footballer (1896–1941)

Balbino
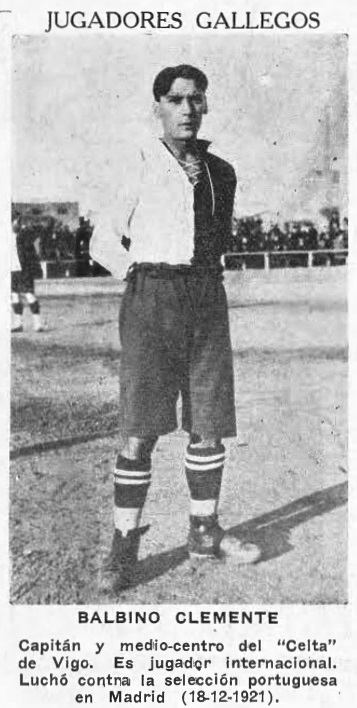

Personal information
- Full name: Balbino Clemente Núñez
- Date of birth: 6 September 1896
- Place of birth: Vedra, Galicia, Spain
- Date of death: 28 March 1941 (aged 44)
- Position: Midfielder

Senior career*
Years	Team	Apps	(Gls)
1915–1917	Fortuna de Vigo		
1917–1918	Real Betis		
1918–1919	Sevilla		
1919–1923	Fortuna de Vigo		
1923–1927	Celta de Vigo		

International career
1921	Spain	1	(0)
1922–1923	Galicia	+3	(+1)
- * Club domestic league appearances and goals

Balbino Clemente Núñez (6 September 1896 – 28 March 1941), better known as Balbino, was a Spanish footballer who played as a midfielder. He was part of the first-ever team fielded by Celta de Vigo in 1923. His brother Juanito was also a footballer.

== Club career ==
Born in Vedra, Galicia, he spent most of his career at his hometown club Fortuna de Vigo, playing for them until it was merged with Real Vigo Sporting in 1923 to form Celta de Vigo. The presentation match of this new team was held at Coia on 16 September 1923, in a meeting between an A and a B team formed with the players from the club, taking advantage of the large team available that they had. Balbino played for the B side that was captained by his brother Juanito, in a 0-2 loss to the A team captained by Luis Otero. The first match against another club came a few days later, on 23 September 1923 against Boavista F.C., in which he was part of an 8-2 victory. On 10 April 1924, he played a friendly match for Celta against the Uruguay national team that would go on to win the 1924 Summer Olympics in Paris. He won three Galician Championships with Celta in 1923-24, 1924-25 and 1925-26.

== International career ==
He received his only cap for Spain on 18 December 1921 at Campo de O'Donnell, in a 3-1 win over Portugal.

Being a player of Real Vigo Sporting, he was summoned to play for the Galicia national team, and he was one of the eleven footballers that played in the team's first-ever game on 19 November 1922, a 4-1 win over a Castile/Madrid XI in the quarter-finals of the 1922-23 Prince of Asturias Cup, an inter-regional competition organized by the RFEF. Balbino helped the team reach the final, in which he opened the scoring early in the game, but eventually lost 1-3 to Asturias national team, courtesy of a second-half brace from José Luis Zabala.

== Honours ==
=== Club ===
Celta de Vigo

Galician Championship:

- Winners (3) 1923-24, 1924-25 and 1925-26

=== International ===
Galicia

Prince of Asturias Cup:

- Runner-up (1): 1922-23
