= Galicia national football team =

National association football team

Galicia
- Nickname: A Irmandiña (The Fellowship)
- Association: Real Federación Galega de Fútbol (RFGF)
- Head coach: Diego Martínez
- Captain: Iago Aspas
- Top scorer: Ramón Polo Pardo (8)
First colours

First international
- Galicia 4–1 Castile (Vigo, Galicia; 19 November 1922)

Biggest win
- Galicia 8–2 Royal Navy XI (Vigo, Galicia; 21 January 1923)

Biggest defeat
- Galicia 1–3 Asturias (Vigo, Galicia; 25 February 1923)

The Galicia national football team is the official football team of Galicia. It is organised by the Galician Football Federation. The team is not affiliated with FIFA or UEFA and is, therefore, only allowed to play friendly matches.

== History ==
=== Early years ===
The first game of the Galician national football team took place on 19 November 1922 in Coia, Vigo, beating the Centro team (which encompassed Madrid and the wider Castile region) 4–1 in the quarter-finals of the 1922–23 Copa del Príncipe de Asturias, an official inter-regional tournament organized by RFEF;– This was at a time when there was no national club championship per se, Galician teams would play each other in the Galician Championship and the winner would then go on to face the other regional champions in the Copa del Rey. Galicia then beat the South team in the semi-finals again by a score of 4–1, with the star of the game being local hero Ramón González. Their surprising campaign arose a wave of enthusiasm among the Galician fans, which prompted the Galician federation to organize several friendlies in January and February 1923, as a warm-up for the final that would be held on the 25th February, and Galicia excelled, winning all 5 games with at least 3 goals scored in each, including an 8–2 win over an English Royal Navy XI and a 7–1 win over a Ferrol/A Coruña XI, the latter of which coming just 7 days before the final, with Ramón González showing great goalscoring form with a hat-trick, but unfortunately, he was unable to play in the final due to injury, and without him, they ended up losing to Asturias 1–3, despite scoring first thanks to Balbino. Three months later they lost for a second time, this time to a Lisbon XI (1-2). However, later political developments in Spain made it impossible for the Galicia national football team to take part in official competitions. Hence, after the Copa del Príncipe de Asturias was discontinued in 1924, all games were merely friendlies. The Galician national football team as such ceased all activity during the time of the Spanish Civil War and the subsequent dictatorship (1936–1975).

=== Revival in 2000s ===
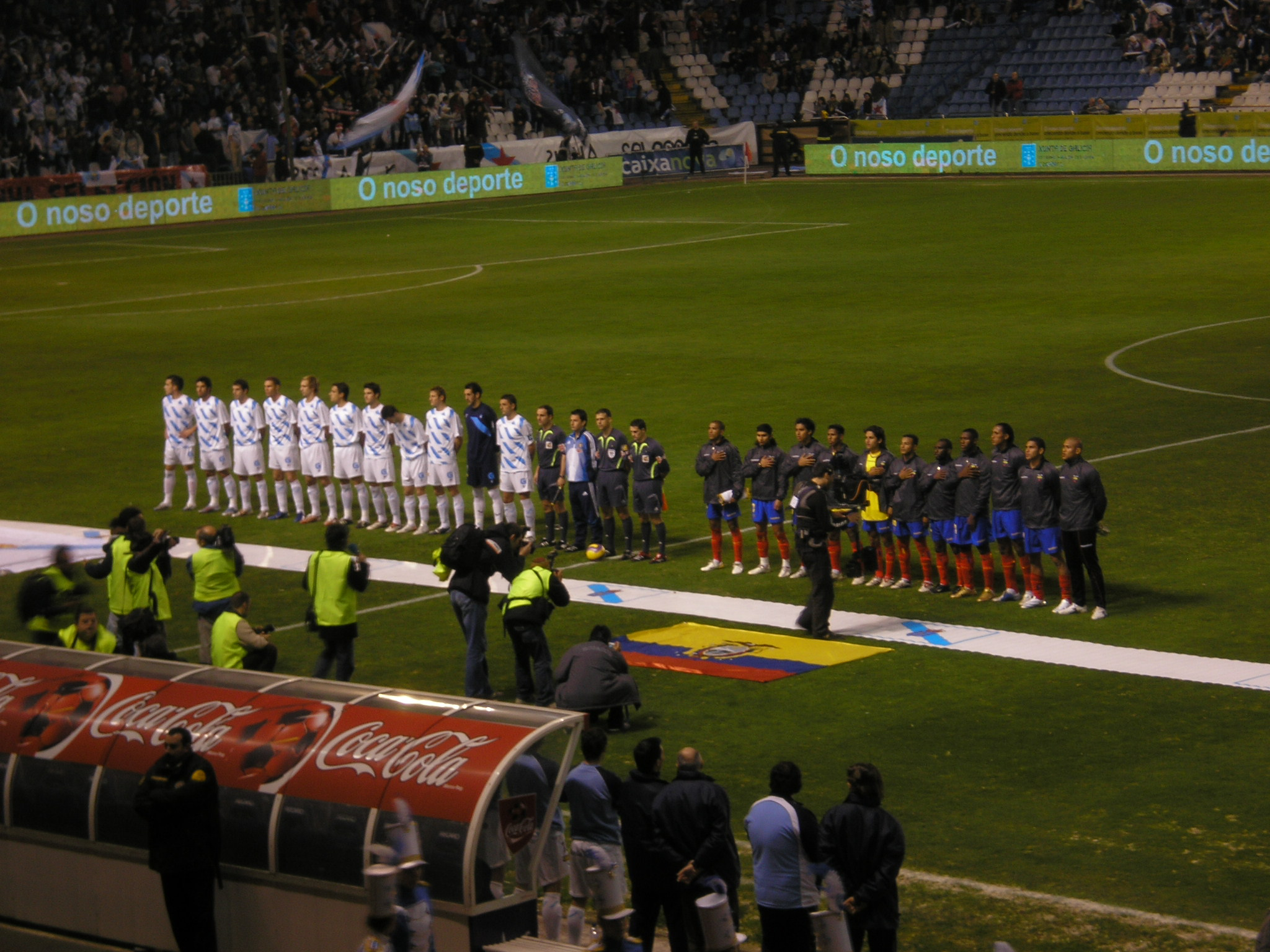
Galicia vs. Ecuador, 28 December 2006.

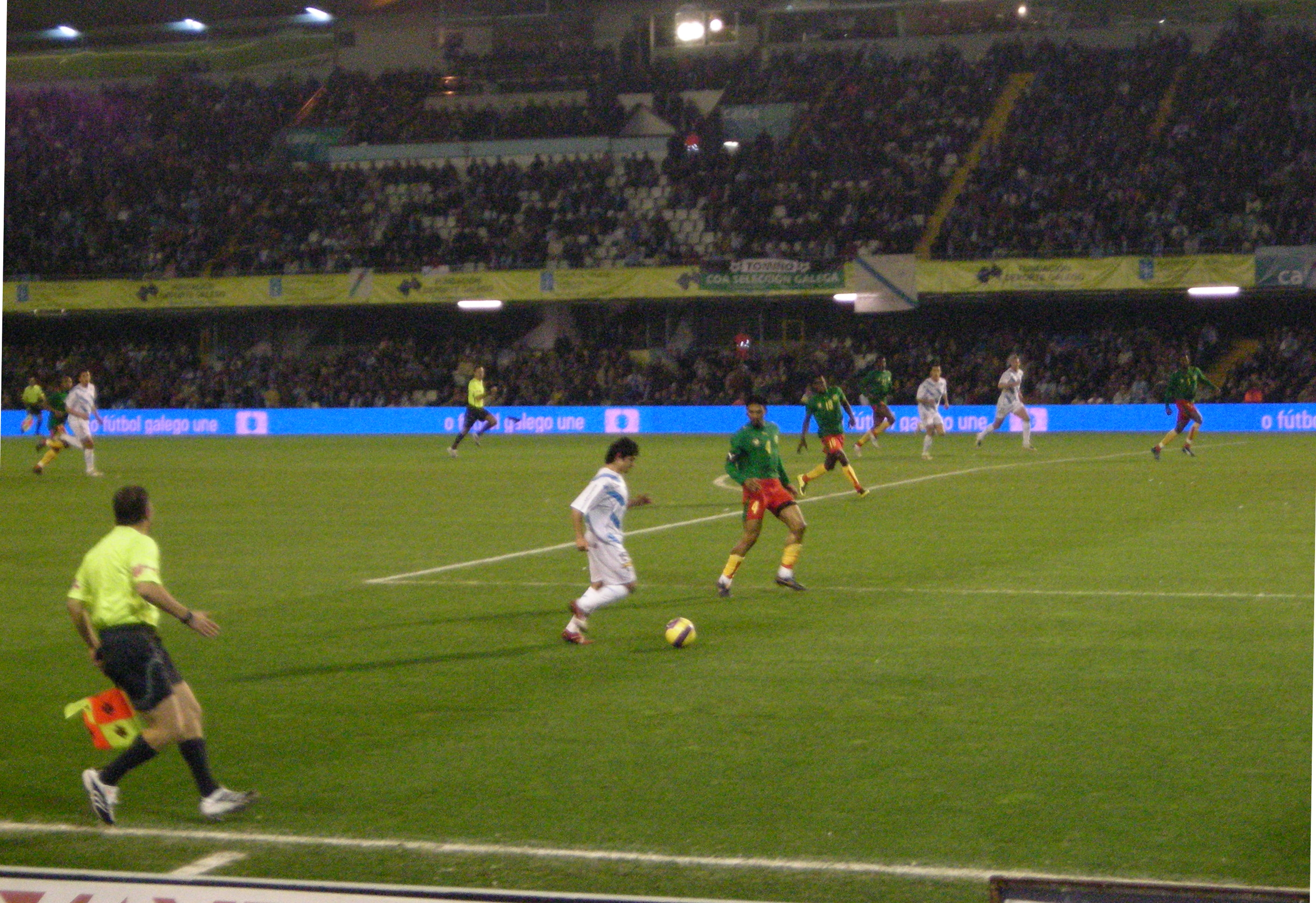
Galicia vs. Cameroon, 27 December 2007.

The project was retaken in the early 1980s, and the first match of the Galician national team after the dictatorship was supposed to be played on 24 July 1980 in Compostela against the Basque Country, but the players ended on holiday instead. In 1982, before the World Cup in Spain, there was an attempt to organize a match against Cameroon, but they failed in their efforts. Galicia had to wait 20 years to finally play again, facing the powerful Uruguay on 29 December 2005. Fernando Vázquez, a former Mallorca and Betis coach, was chosen as the coach, and he formed a Galicia XI which had the likes of Diego López, Ricardo Cabanas and José Luis Deus. The San Lázaro stadium was packed for the occasion and surprisingly, they found themselves 3–0 up with 10 minutes to go with goals from Deus (2) and Nano, and even though Uruguay scored two late goals in a 3–2 Galician win, the Galician fans were very pleased with the team's performance. In December 2006, another game was contested against Ecuador, played in Riazor in A Coruña and Galicia held them to a 1–1 draw. The following year, against Cameroon, the result was the same, with Cameroon only equalizing thanks to a last-minute penalty converted by Rigobert Song. In 2008, the Irmandiña played another friendly game, this time against Iran and won 3–2 with goals from Nacho Novo (2) and Roberto Losada.

=== Amateur era ===
Changes in the composition of the Galician Government after the 2009 elections resulted in a lack of official support for the national team. However, the supporters' group Siareiros Galegos managed to organise a number of non-official international games involving Galician players from lower categories as a sign of protest, giving continuation to the project. These efforts were supported by a number of local governments, which would allow the use of their facilities. Galicia played teams representing Palestine, Western Sahara, Iraqi Kurdistan and Occitania in 2013. Siareiros Galegos announced at that time that it would be the last match until further notice due to the financial situation. On 26 December 2015, however, Siareiros Galegos did set up yet another game, where Galicia faced players representing Senegal.

=== Second revival ===
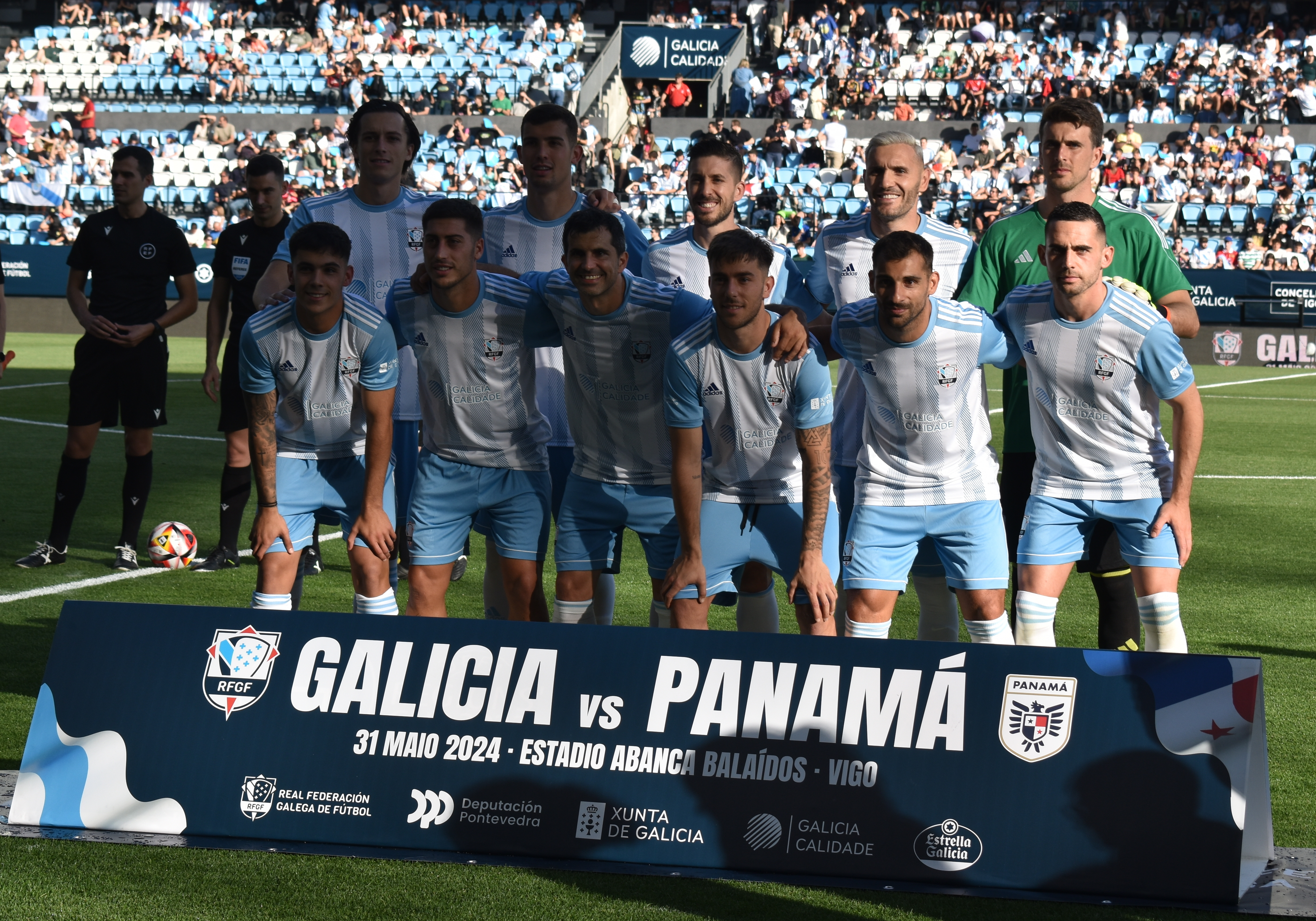
Galicia vs. Panama.

The current president of the FGF, Mr Louzán, days after the Senegal game, announced that the Federation would organise a first-level game again in 2016. It was mentioned that players from the top professional Galician teams, Deportivo and Celta, had lobbied in favour. A game was eventually held on 20 May in Riazor, where Galicia met Venezuela to a 1–1 draw. After the game, the Galician coaches mentioned the keen interest expressed by players to continue with the project and play more games on a regular basis.

== Official matches ==
19 November 1922 1922–23 Prince of Asturias Cup quarter-finals	Galicia	4–1	Centro	Vigo, Galicia
	Chiarroni; Polo; Pinilla (pen.); González	Report	Monjardín	Stadium: Coia; Referee: (Portugal) Ivo Lemes

14 January 1923 1922–23 Prince of Asturias Cup semi-finals	South (Andalusia)	1–4	Galicia	Seville, Spain
	Kinké	Report	González; Polo; Chiarroni	Stadium: Reina Victoria; Referee: (Community of Madrid) Montero

25 February 1923 1922–23 Prince of Asturias Cup Final	Galicia	1–3	Asturias	Vigo, Galicia
	Balbino	Report	Meana; Zabala	Stadium: Coia; Referee: (Basque Country (autonomous community)) Leclerc

25 November 1923 1923–24 Prince of Asturias Cup quarter-finals	Central Spain	1–0	Galicia	Madrid, Spain
	De Miguel	Report; Report2		Stadium: Ciudad Lineal; Referee: (Catalonia) Agustín Cruella Tena

== Friendly matches ==
7 January 1923 Friendly	Galicia	3–1	Lisbon XI	Vigo, Galicia
	Polo; Reigosa			Stadium: Coia; Referee: Ventura Lago

21 January 1923 Friendly	Galicia	8–2	Royal Navy XI	Vigo, Galicia
	Pinilla; González			Stadium: Coia

28 January 1923 Friendly	Galicia	4–1	Pontevedra XI	Vigo, Galicia
	Correa; Polo; Chiarroni			Stadium: Campo de Bouzas

4 February 1923 Friendly	Pontevedra XI	1–3	Galicia	Pontevedra, Galicia
			Pasarín; Chiarroni	Stadium: Pasarón

18 February 1923 Friendly	Galicia	7–1	Ferrol/A Coruña XI	Vigo, Galicia
	González; Polo; Chiarroni			Stadium: Coia

27 May 1923 Friendly	Lisbon XI	2–1	Galicia	Lisbon, Portugal
	João Francisco; Gonçalves		Pinilla	Stadium: Campo Grande

28 July 1929 Friendly	Galicia	0–0	Central Spain	Madrid, Spain
				Stadium: Ciudad Lineal

1 June 1930 Friendly	Galicia	4–2	Sporting CP	Vigo, Galicia
	Losada; Polo			Stadium: Balaídos

8 June 1930 Friendly	Central Spain	1–4	Galicia	Madrid, Spain
			Losada; Fariña; Hilario	Stadium: Chamartín

29 December 2005 Friendly	Galicia	3–2	Uruguay	Santiago de Compostela, Galicia
	Nano 9'; Deus 48', 79'	Report	Pereira 83'; Albín 90+1'	Stadium: San Lázaro; Attendance: 12,000; Referee: Bernardino González Vázquez (Galicia)

28 December 2006 Friendly	Galicia	1–1	Ecuador	A Coruña, Galicia
	Jonathan Pereira 68'	Report	Calle 63'	Stadium: Riazor; Attendance: 20,000; Referee: Bernardino González Vázquez (Galicia)

27 December 2007 Friendly	Galicia	1–1	Cameroon	Vigo, Galicia
	Julio Álvarez 73'	Report	Song 90' (pen.)	Stadium: Balaídos; Attendance: 28,000; Referee: Ignacio Iglesias Villanueva (Galicia)

27 December 2008 Friendly	Galicia	3–2	Iran	A Coruña, Galicia
20:45	Nacho Novo 23', 59'; Losada 66'	Report	Borhani 32'; Khalatbari 82'	Stadium: Riazor; Attendance: 12,000; Referee: Ignacio Iglesias Villanueva (Galicia)

20 May 2016 Friendly	Galicia	1–1	Venezuela	A Coruña, Galicia
20:00	Aspas 36'	Report	Martínez 92'	Stadium: Riazor; Attendance: 18,000; Referee: Ignacio Iglesias Villanueva (Galicia)

31 May 2024 Friendly	Galicia	0–2	Panama	Vigo, Galicia
20:00		Report	Davis 24' (pen.); Miller 40'	Stadium: Balaídos; Attendance: 16,000; Referee: Alejandro Muñiz Ruiz

== Statistics ==
=== Top Scorers ===
Rank	Player	Goals
1	Ramón Polo Pardo	8
2	Ramón González	7
2	José Chiarroni	7

== Honours ==
UEFA Regions Cup:

- Winners (1): 2023

Prince of Asturias Cup:

- Runners-up (1): 1922–23

== Current squad ==
The following players were called up for the friendly against Panama on 31 May 2024.

Caps and goals as of 31 May 2024 after the match against Panama

No.	Pos.	Player	Date of birth (age)	Caps	Goals	Club
	GK	Álvaro Ratón	29 January 1993 (age 33)	1	0	(Polish Football Association) Wisła Kraków
	GK	Fran Vieites	7 May 1999 (age 27)	1	0	(The Football Association) Leicester City
	GK	Iván Villar	9 July 1997 (age 29)	1	0	(Royal Spanish Football Federation) Celta
	DF	Jonny Otto	3 March 1994 (age 32)	2	0	(Hellenic Football Federation) PAOK
	DF	Hugo Bueno	18 September 2002 (age 24)	1	0	(Royal Dutch Football Association) Feyenoord
	DF	Álvaro Carreras	23 March 2003 (age 23)	1	0	(Royal Spanish Football Federation) Real Madrid
	DF	Carlos Domínguez	11 February 2001 (age 25)	1	0	(Royal Spanish Football Federation) Celta
	DF	Quique Fornos	1 January 1997 (age 29)	1	0	(Royal Spanish Football Federation) Cultura Leonesa
	DF	Germán Nóvoa	6 August 1996 (age 30)	1	0	(Royal Spanish Football Federation) Arenteiro
	DF	Lucas Taibo	2 March 2006 (age 20)	1	0	(Portuguese Football Federation) Sporting CP
	DF	Kevin Vázquez	23 March 1993 (age 33)	1	0	(Royal Spanish Football Federation) Celta
	MF	Álvaro Lemos	30 March 1993 (age 33)	1	0	(Royal Spanish Football Federation) Las Palmas
	MF	Álex López	11 January 1988 (age 38)	1	0	(Royal Spanish Football Federation) Racing Ferrol
	MF	Miguel Loureiro	21 November 1996 (age 29)	1	0	(Royal Spanish Football Federation) Huesca
	MF	Hugo Sotelo	19 December 2003 (age 22)	1	0	(Royal Spanish Football Federation) Celta
	MF	Diego Villares	17 June 1996 (age 30)	1	0	(Royal Spanish Football Federation) Deportivo La Coruna
	FW	Lucas Pérez	10 September 1988 (age 38)	2	0	(Royal Dutch Football Association) PSV Eindhoven
	FW	Iago Aspas	1 August 1987 (age 39)	1	1	(Royal Spanish Football Federation) Celta
	FW	Luis Rodríguez Chacón	30 May 2000 (age 26)	1	0	(Royal Spanish Football Federation) Arenteiro
	FW	Manuel Justo	9 February 1996 (age 30)	1	0	(Royal Spanish Football Federation) Racing Ferrol
	FW	Iker Losada	1 August 2001 (age 25)	1	0	(Royal Spanish Football Federation) Betis
	FW	Héber Pena	16 January 1990 (age 36)	1	0	(Royal Spanish Football Federation) Racing Ferrol
	FW	Miguel Rodríguez	29 April 2003 (age 23)	1	0	(Royal Dutch Football Association) Utrecht

=== Previous call-ups ===
The following players have been called up for recent fixtures and are still available for selection.

Pos.	Player	Date of birth (age)	Caps	Goals	Club	Latest call-up

== Notable players ==
List of Galician players who also represented FIFA international teams in International and Olympic matches.
Players in bold have won the FIFA World Cup.
Players in underlined have won a continental championships.
Players in italics have won the gold medal at the Olympic Games

Argentina

- Grégorio Juan Esperón
- Emiliano Insúa
- Erik Lamela
- Manuel Saa Parente

Belgium

- Matias Fernandez-Pardo

Brazil

- **Pepe**
- Rafinha

Chile

- José Luis Sierra

Cyprus

- Urko Pardo

Equatorial Guinea

- Saúl Coco
- Iban Salvador
- Néstor Senra

Hong Kong

- Dani Cancela

Liechtenstein

- Ivan Quintans

Peru

- Ramón Quiroga

Serbia

- Vanja Milinković-Savić

Spain

- Juan Acuña
- Amancio Amaro
- Thiago Alcântara
- Diego Álvarez
- Iago Aspas
- Berto
- Francisco Buyo
- Luis Cembranos
- Antonio Chao (Note: Only played in one unofficial wartime international: See Spain national football team results (unofficial matches).)
- Chacho
- Ramón González
- Quique Costas
- Donato Gama da Silva
- Moncho Gil
- Fran González
- Miguel Ángel González
- **Borja Iglesias**
- Manuel Jiménez
- Joselu
- José Lemos
- Diego López
- Marianín
- Diego Mariño
- Marcelino Martínez
- Brais Méndez
- Juan Monjardín
- Unai Nuñez
- Borja Oubiña
- Jorge Otero
- Luis Otero
- Jonny Otto
- Pahiño
- Luis Pasarín
- Manuel Pazos
- Peixe
- Carlos Pellicer
- José Pérez Pombo
- Ramón Polo
- Enrique Ponte
- Ciprianao Prada
- Severino Reija
- Tomás Reñones
- Héctor Rial
- José Fernando Rodilla
- Rodrigo
- Agustín Rodríguez
- Michel Salgado
- José Emilio Santamaría
- Denis Suárez
- Luis Suárez
- Jesús Tartilán
- **Fernando Torres**
- Juan Carlos Touriño
- José Ufarte
- Marcos Vales
- Lucas Vázquez
- José Luis Veloso

Switzerland

- Loris Benito
- Ricardo Cabanas
- Ricardo Rodríguez

United States

- Santiago Formoso
- Alfonso Marina

Uruguay

- **José Pedro Cea**
- Martín Campaña
- Chory Castro
- **Héctor Castro**
- Sebastián Coates
- Óscar Ferro
- **Álvaro Gestido**
- **Lorenzo Fernández**
- Alejandro Lago
- Nicolás Lodeiro
- **Óscar Míguez**
- Eber Moas
- Marcelo Otero
- Maxi Pereira
- Gastón Pereiro
- Mario Regueiro
- **Víctor Rodríguez Andrade**
- Martín Silva
- Gastón Silva
- Lucas Torreira
- Guillermo Varela
- Severino Varela

Venezuela

- Julio Álvarez
- Andrés Túñez

== See also ==
- Galician Championship
- Galician Amateur Championship
- Galicia women's national football team
- Galicia national basketball team
