= Santiago (comarca) =

Coordinates: 42.8667°N 8.6°W

- Comarca
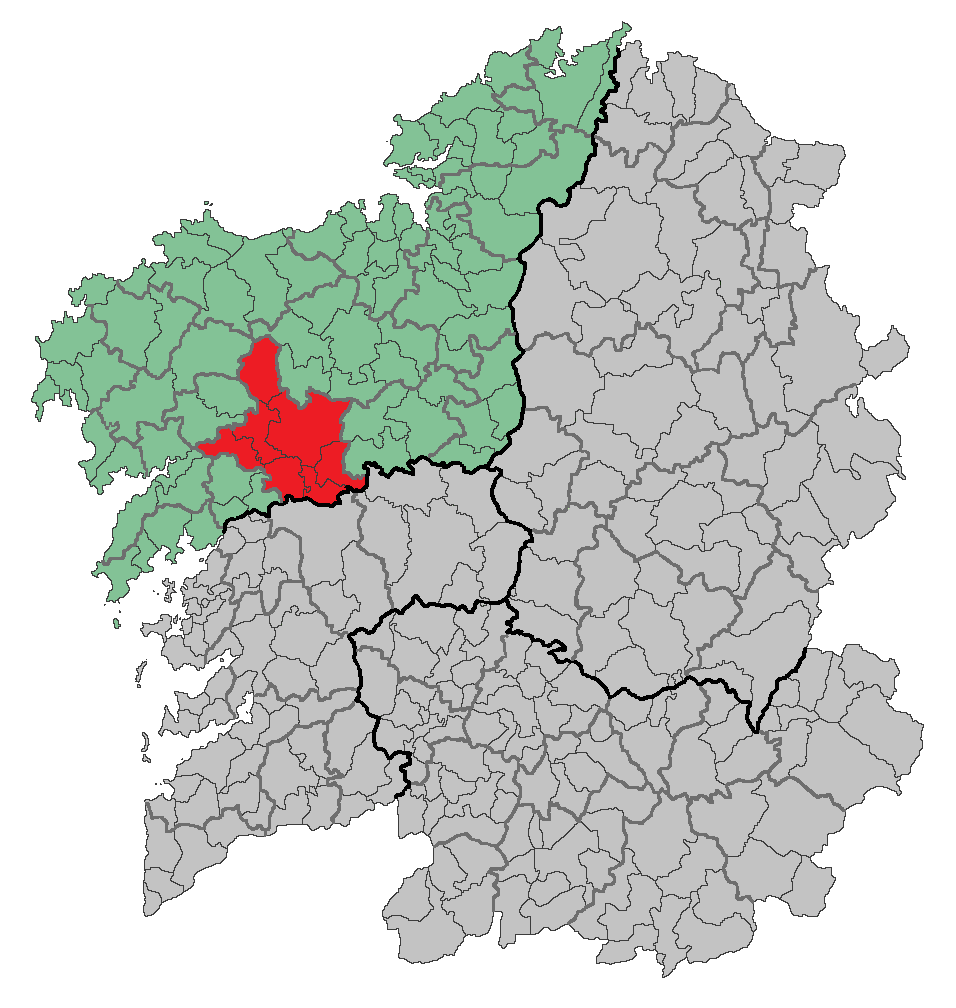
- Country: Spain
- Autonomous community: Galicia
- Province: A Coruña
- Capital: Santiago de Compostela
- Municipalities: List: Ames, Boqueixón, Brión, Santiago de Compostela, Teo, Val do Dubra, Vedra

Area
  - Total: 689 km^{2} (266 sq mi)

Population (2019)
  - Total: 168,601
  - Density: 245/km^{2} (634/sq mi)
- Demonym: Santiagués
- Time zone: UTC+1 (CET)
  - Summer (DST): UTC+2 (CEST)

Santiago is a comarca in the Galician Province of A Coruña. The overall population of this local region is 168,601 (2019).

== Municipalities ==
Ames, Boqueixón, Brión, Santiago de Compostela, Teo, Val do Dubra and Vedra.
