= Simo Bouzaidi =

Moroccan footballer

Personal information
- Full name: Mohamed Bouzaidi Diouri
- Date of birth: 16 November 1999 (age 26)
- Place of birth: Olot, Spain
- Height: 1.71 m (5 ft 7 in)
- Position: Winger

Team information
- Current team: Marítimo
- Number: 21

Youth career
- Olot
- 2015–2018: Sevilla

Senior career*
Years	Team	Apps	(Gls)
2018–2019	Sevilla C	29	(9)
2019–2021	Sevilla B	30	(2)
2021–2024	Córdoba	101	(20)
2024–2025	Eldense	12	(1)
2025–	Marítimo	31	(8)

International career
2016–2017	Morocco U17	9	(3)
2018	Morocco U20	5	(1)
- * Club domestic league appearances and goals as of 19 June 2026

Mohamed Bouzaidi Diouri (born 16 November 1999), known as Simo Bouzaidi or just Simo, is a footballer who plays as a winger for Liga Portugal club Marítimo. Born in Spain, he represents Morocco at international level.

== Club career ==
Born in Olot, Girona, Catalonia, Bouzaidi joined Sevilla FC's youth sides in 2015, from hometown side UE Olot. He made his senior debut with the C-team on 9 September 2018, in a 4–0 Tercera División away loss to Algeciras CF, and scored his first goal fourteen days later, netting the opener in a 2–1 win at CD Ciudad de Lucena.

Bouzaidi was promoted to the reserves in Segunda División B ahead of the 2019–20 season, but was only a backup option during his two-year spell. On 11 July 2021, he signed a two-year contract with Segunda División RFEF side Córdoba CF.

After helping the Blanquiverdes to achieve promotion to Primera Federación, Bouzaidi renewed his link until 2024 on 25 January 2022. He continued to feature regularly in the following years, contributing with six goals in 40 appearances overall during the 2023–24 campaign as the club returned to Segunda División after a five-year absence.

On 28 June 2024, Bouzaidi agreed to a two-year deal with CD Eldense in the second division. He made his professional debut on 21 September, replacing Nacho Quintana late into a 1–1 home draw against Real Oviedo.

On 14 August 2025, after suffering relegation, Bouzaidi moved abroad and signed a two-year contract with C.S. Marítimo of the Liga Portugal 2.

== International career ==
Bouzaidi represented Morocco at under-17 and under-20 levels.
