= Teo, A Coruña =

Municipality of Galicia, Spain

Coordinates: 42°45′N 8°30′W

Teo
- Municipality
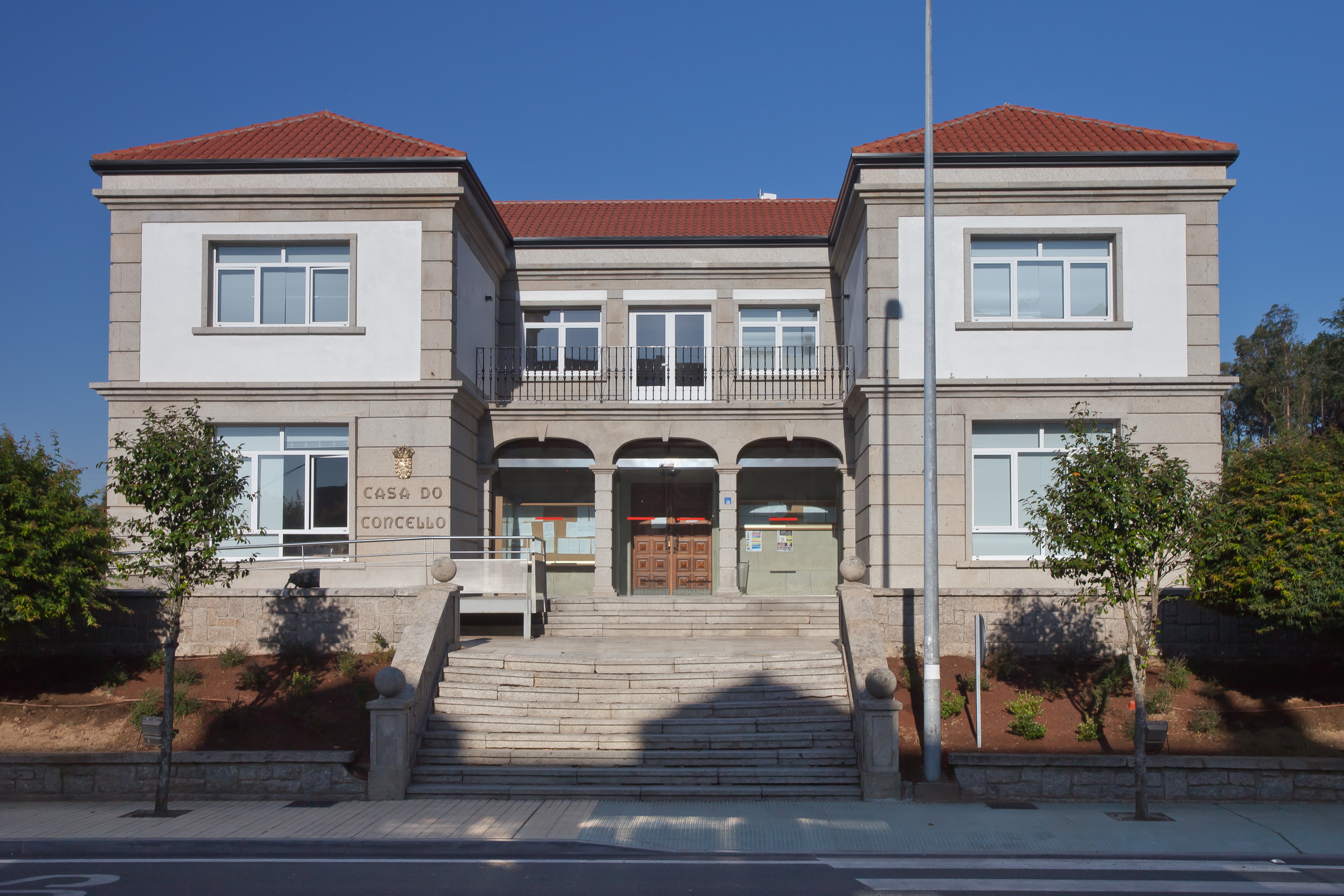
- Town hall in Teo.

- Flag Coat of arms

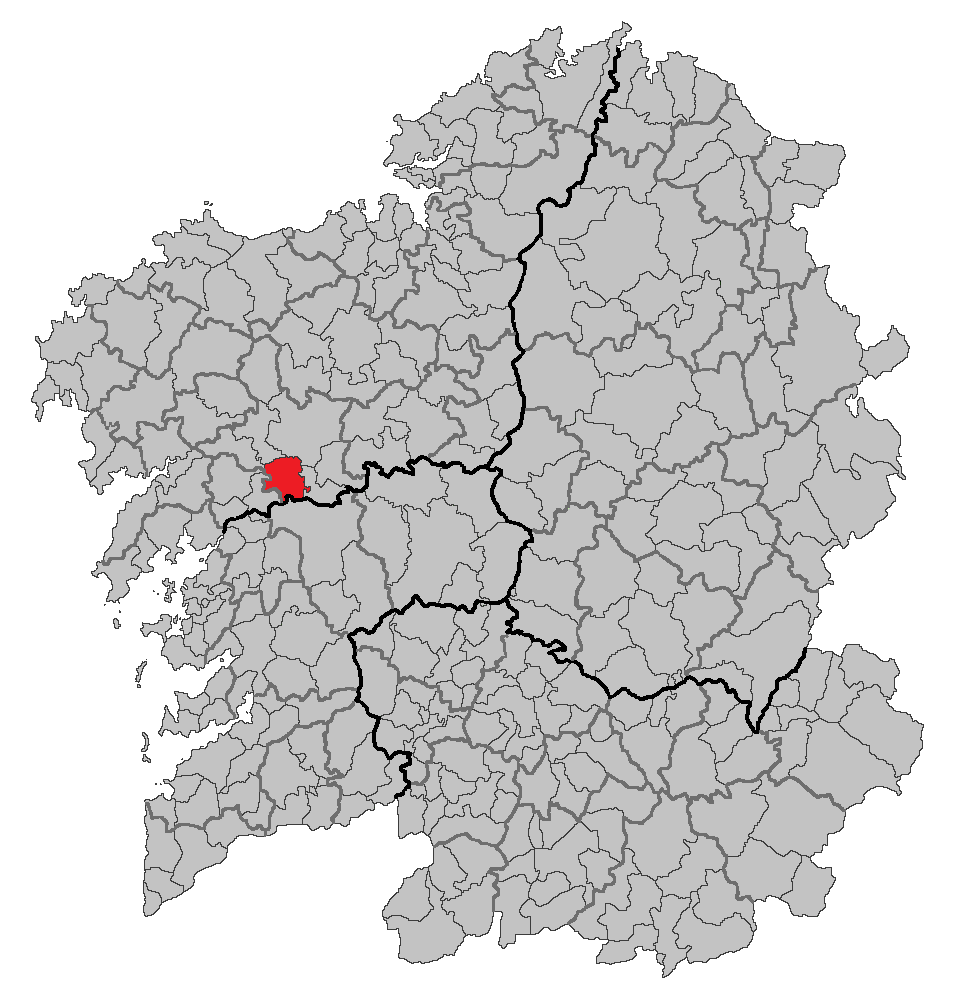
- Location of Teo

- Location in Spain
- Country: Spain
- Autonomous community: Galicia
- Province: A Coruña
- Comarca: Santiago

Government
  - Alcalde: Lucía Calvo de la Uz (People's Party)
- Demonym: Teense
- Time zone: UTC+1 (CET)
  - Summer (DST): UTC+2 (CEST)
- Postal code: 15883
- Website: Official website

Teo is a municipality in the province of A Coruña, in the autonomous community of Galicia, northwestern Spain. It has a population of 18,266 (Spanish 2011 Census) and an area of 79 km^{2} (31 sq mi).

== See also ==
- List of municipalities in A Coruña
