= Ian Uranga =

Spanish footballer

Personal information
- Full name: Ian Uranga Chong
- Date of birth: 22 June 1987 (age 39)
- Place of birth: Durango, Spain
- Height: 1.77 m (5 ft 9 1/2 in)
- Position: Midfielder

Youth career
- Alavés

Senior career*
Years	Team	Apps	(Gls)
2005–2006	Alavés B	32	(3)
2006–2007	Alavés	3	(0)
2007	→ Barakaldo (loan)	9	(0)
2007–2008	Real Unión	13	(0)
2008–2009	Lemona	35	(0)
2009–2011	Barakaldo	49	(0)
2011–2012	Lemona	29	(0)
2012–2022	Arenas Getxo	273	(15)
Total		443	(18)
- * Club domestic league appearances and goals

Ian Uranga Chong (born 22 June 1987 in Durango, Biscay) is a Spanish former professional footballer who played as a midfielder.
