= Manu Justo =

Spanish footballer (born 1996)

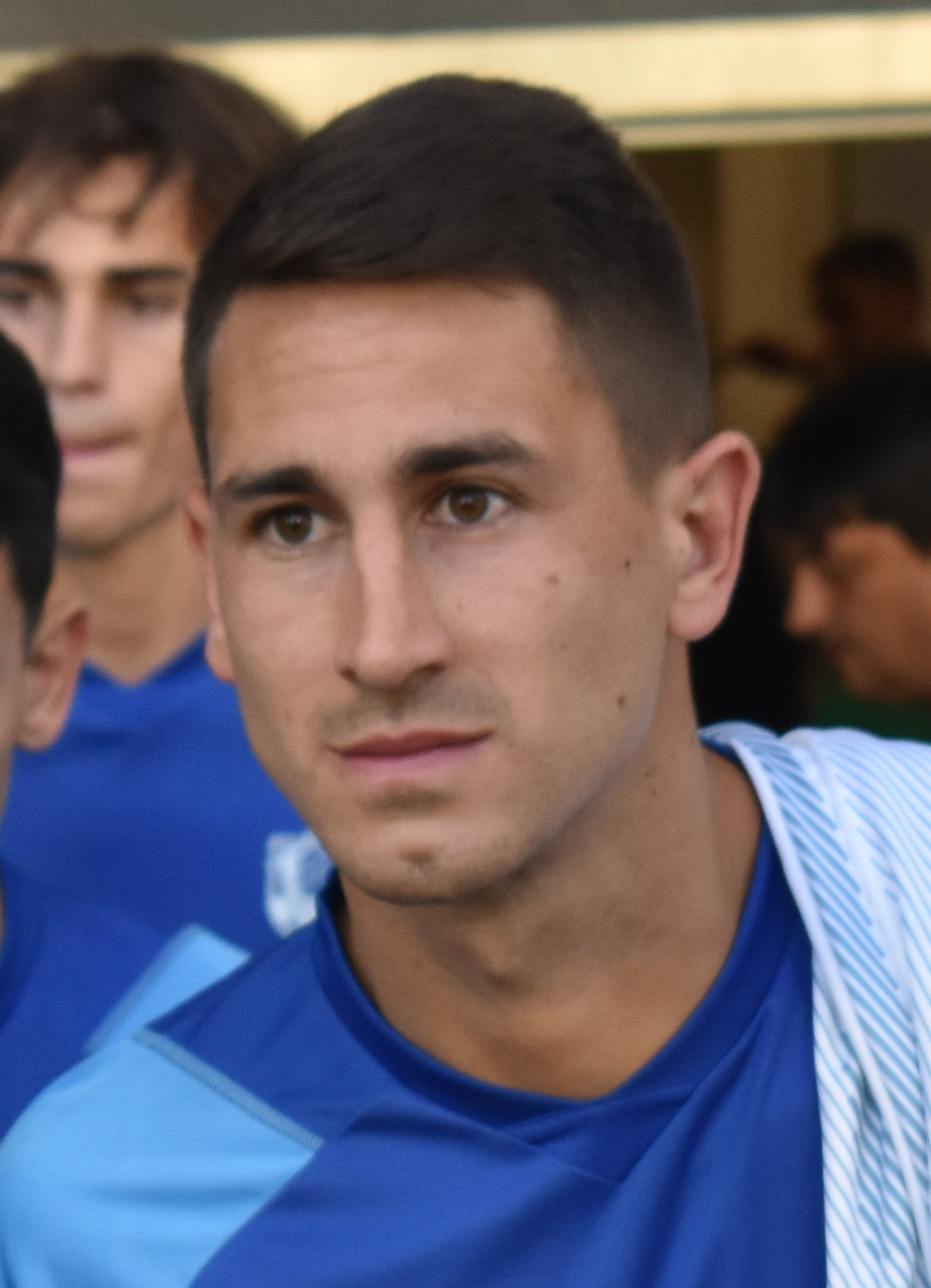
- Justo with Galicia in 2024

Personal information
- Full name: Manuel Justo Román
- Date of birth: 9 February 1996 (age 30)
- Place of birth: Vigo, Spain
- Height: 1.74 m (5 ft 9 in)
- Position: Forward

Youth career
- Areosa

Senior career*
Years	Team	Apps	(Gls)
2015–2016	Rápido Bouzas	28	(3)
2016–2018	Arosa	46	(10)
2018–2019	Coruxo	35	(10)
2019–2022	Elche	0	(0)
2019–2020	→ UCAM Murcia (loan)	18	(2)
2020–2021	→ Celta B (loan)	29	(10)
2021–2022	→ Racing Santander (loan)	31	(5)
2022–2024	Racing Ferrol	60	(13)
2024–2026	Cultural Leonesa	64	(18)

International career
2024	Galicia	1	(0)
- * Club domestic league appearances and goals as of 31 May 2026

Manuel "Manu" Justo Román (born 6 February 1996) is a Spanish footballer. Mainly a forward, he can also play as a right winger.

== Club career ==
Born in Vigo, Pontevedra, Galicia, Justo was a CD Areosa youth graduate. In July 2015, after finishing his formation, he joined Tercera División side Rápido de Bouzas on trial, and signed a contract with the club in the following month.

On 16 June 2016, Justo moved to fellow fourth division side Arosa SC. On 15 June 2018, after establishing himself as a starter, he signed for Coruxo FC in Segunda División B.

On 9 July 2019, Justo signed a three-year contract with Segunda División side Elche CF, but was loaned to UCAM Murcia CF in the third division on 2 August. The following 31 January, his loan was terminated, and he moved to fellow league team Celta de Vigo B also in a temporary deal.

On 16 September 2020, Justo's loan with Celta B was extended for the entire 2020–21 season. On 12 August 2021, he agreed to a one-year loan deal with Racing de Santander, and helped in their promotion from the Primera División RFEF as overall champions with five goals.

On 29 June 2022, Justo signed a permanent two-year deal with Racing de Ferrol also in the third division. He was the club's top goalscorer during his first season with 12 goals, as they returned to the second level after 15 years.

Justo made his professional debut at the age of 27 on 12 August 2023, coming on as a second-half substitute for Sabin Merino in a 1–0 away win over former side Elche. He scored his first professional goal on 26 May of the following year, netting a last-minute equalizer through a penalty kick in a 2–2 home draw against CD Leganés.

On 24 June 2024, Justo moved to Cultural y Deportiva Leonesa in the third division.

== Honours ==
Racing Santander

- Primera División RFEF: 2021–22
