= Vedra =

Coordinates: 42°47′N 8°28′W

- Municipality
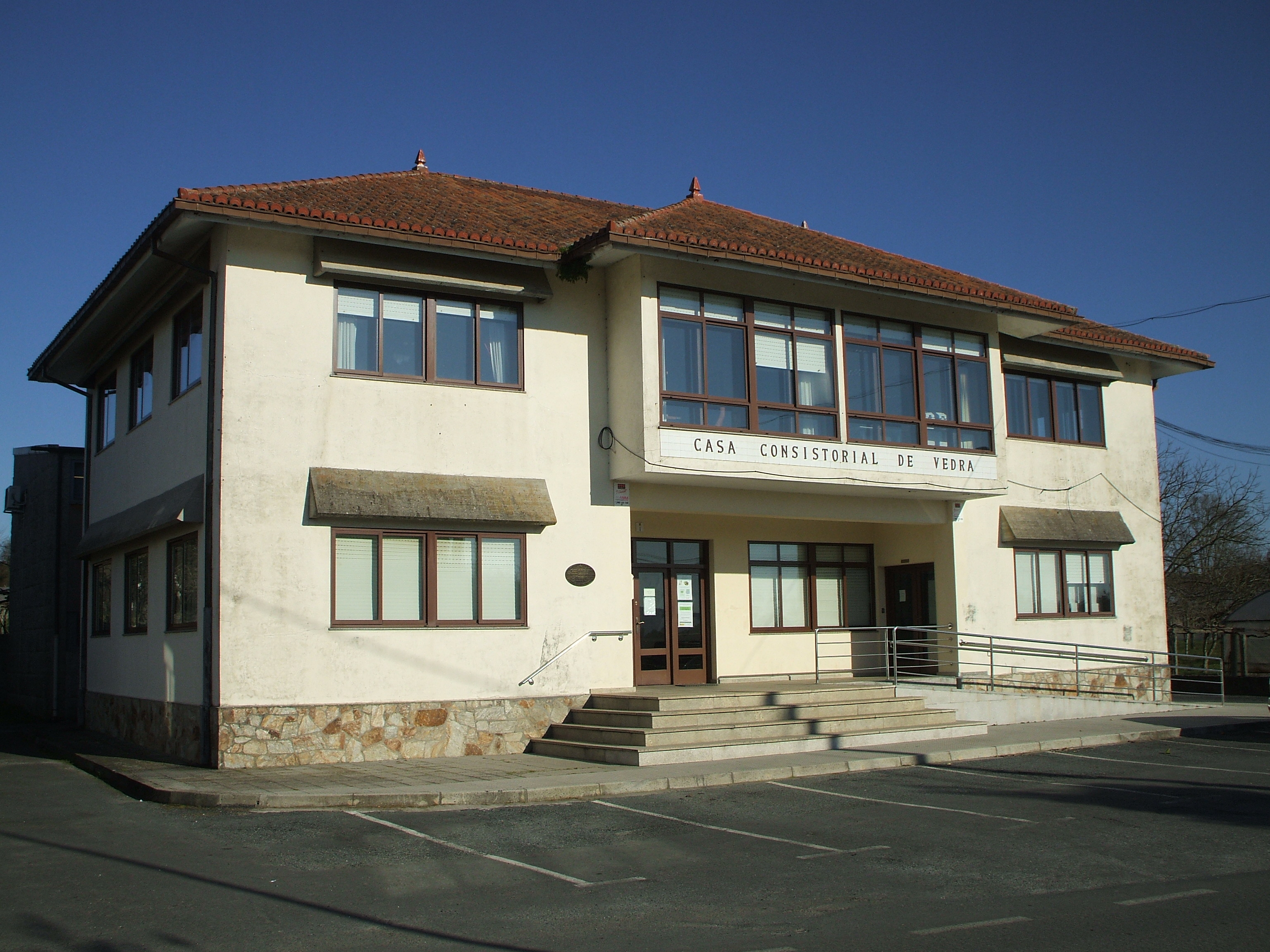
- Town hall.

- Flag Coat of arms

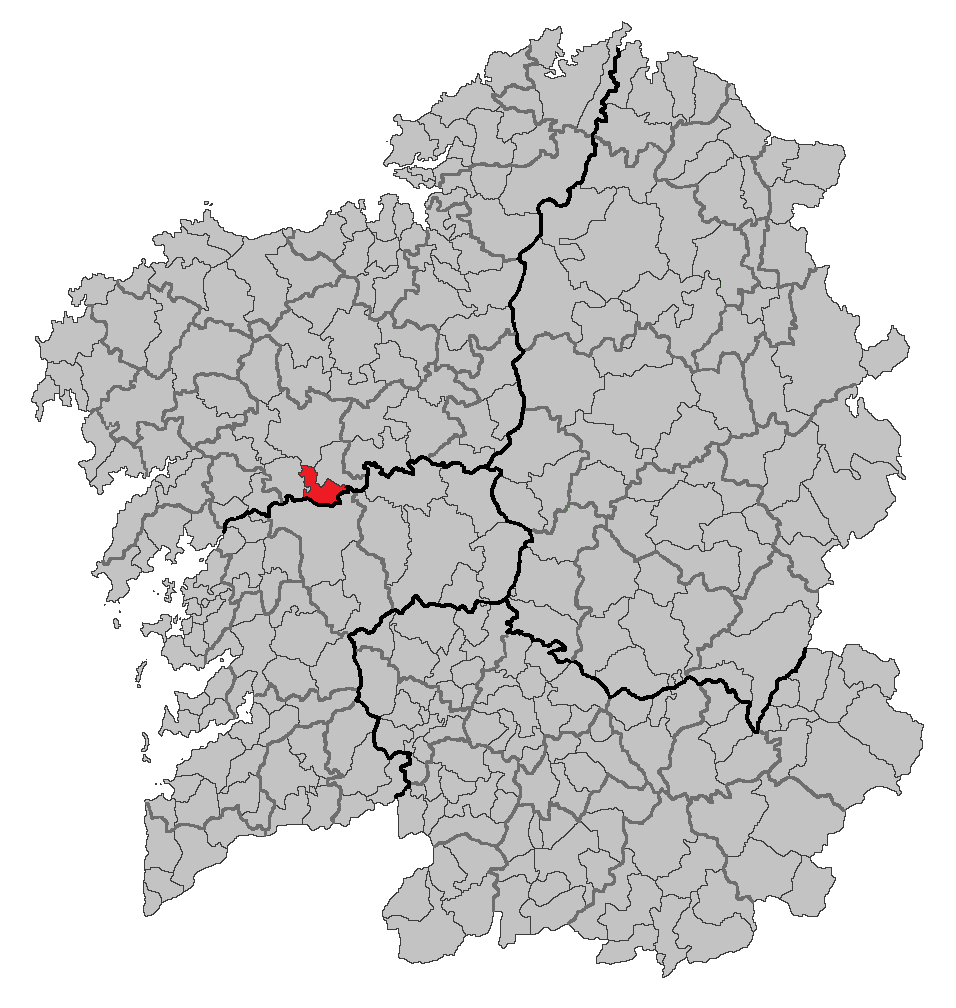
- Location of Vedra

- Location in Spain
- Country: Spain
- Autonomous community: Galicia
- Province: A Coruña
- Comarca: Santiago

Government
  - Alcalde: Carlos Martínez Carrillo (People's Party of Galicia)

Area
  - Total: 531 km^{2} (205 sq mi)

Population (2001)
  - Total: 5,031
  - Density: 9.47/km^{2} (24.5/sq mi)
- Demonym: Vedrense
- Time zone: UTC+1 (CET)
  - Summer (DST): UTC+2 (CEST)
- Postal code: 15885
- Website: Official website

Vedra is a municipality in the province of A Coruña in the autonomous community of Galicia, in northwestern Spain. It belongs to the comarca of Santiago. It has a population of 5031 (Spanish 2001 Census) and an area of 53 km^{2} (20 sq mi).

== See also ==
- List of municipalities in A Coruña
