= Solari (surname) =

Solari is an Italian surname. Notable people with the surname include:

- Andrea Solari (c. 1460–1524), Italian painter
- Augusto Solari (born 1992), Argentine football player
- Benjamin Solari Parravicini, (c. 1898–1974), Argentine painter
- Cristoforo Solari (c. 1460–1527), Italian architect and sculptor
- David Solari (footballer) (born 1986), Argentine football player
- Eduardo Solari (born 1955), Argentine football player and manager
- Esteban Solari (born 1980), Argentine football player
- Facundo Solari (died 1912), the namesake of Capitán Solari in Chaco, Argentina
- Federico Redondo Solari (born 2003), Argentine football player
- Giovanni Solari (1400–1482), Italian architect, son of Marco
- Guiniforte Solari (1429–1481), Italian architect
- Indio Solari (1949–2026), Argentine musician and singer
- Jorge Solari (born 1941), football manager
- Laura Solari (1913–1984), Italian film actress
- Liz Solari (born 1983), Argentine actress and model
- Magdalena Solari Quintana (born 1968), Argentine politician
- Malucha Solari (1920–2005), Nicaraguan-Chilean ballerina and choreographer
- Marco Solari (1355–1405), Italian architect
- Pablo Solari (born 2001), Argentine football player
- Pietro Antonio Solari (died 1493), Italian architect
- Santiago Solari (born 1976), Argentine football player
- Santino Solari (1576–1646), Italian architect and sculptor
- Tomás Juan Carlos Solari (1899–1954), Argentine prelate

== See also ==
- Paolo Soleri (1919–2013), Italian-American architect
- Solari (disambiguation)
- Solère
