= Liz Solari =

Argentine actress and model

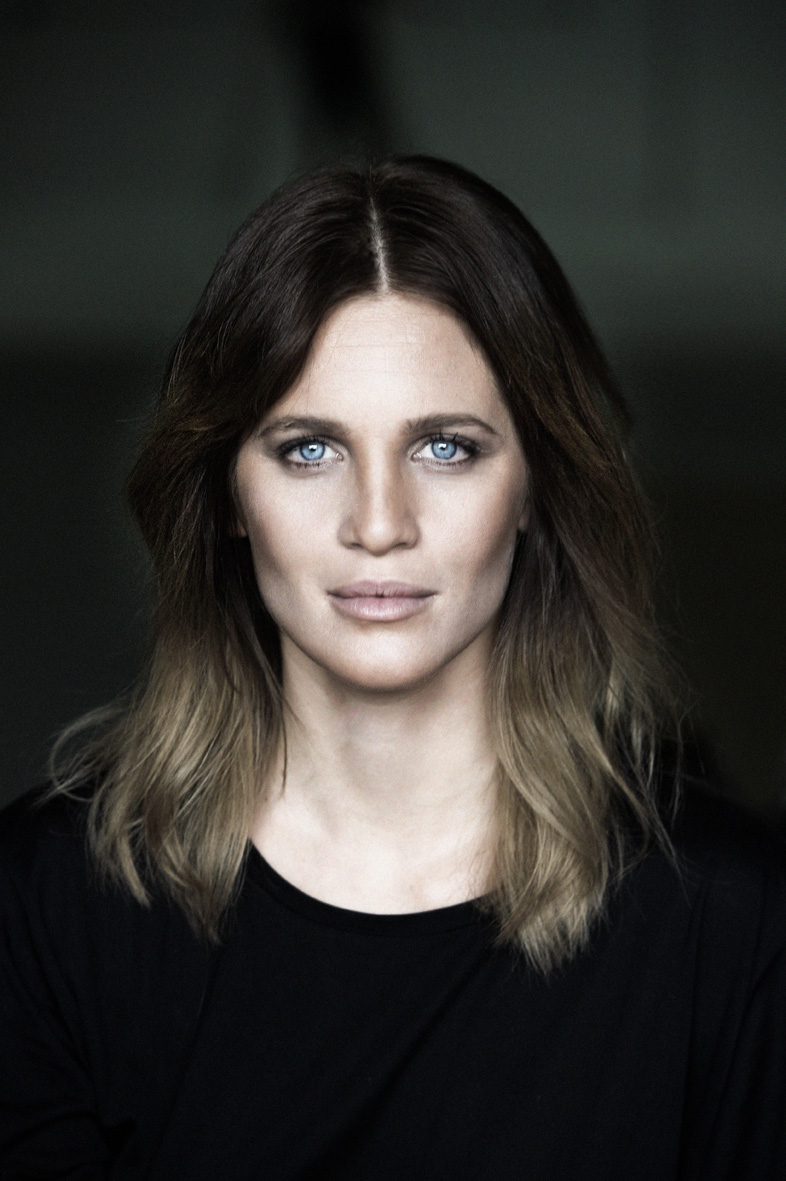
- Liz Solari in 2015
- Born: María Isabel Solari Poggio; June 18, 1983 (age 43); Barranquilla, Colombia
- Education: Royal Central School of Speech and Drama
- Relatives: Jorge Solari (uncle); Santiago Solari (brother); Esteban Solari (brother); David Solari (brother); Federico Redondo (nephew); Augusto Solari (cousin)
- Website: lizsolari.com

María Isabel Solari Poggio, known as Liz Solari (born June 18, 1983), is an Argentine actress and model. She developed a long career in modeling before becoming established as an actress in local and foreign cinema and television. She is a UNICEF Ambassador in Argentina.

== Biography ==
She was born on June 18, 1983, in Barranquilla, Colombia, where her father, Eduardo Solari, was a football coach directing Junior de Barranquilla's association football club. Her family returned to live in Argentina when she was 3 years old. She lived her early childhood and teenage years in the city of Rosario, where she also attended High School at the Escuela Normal Superior Nº1 "Dr. Nicolás Avellaneda".

Her uncle Jorge, and her three brothers Esteban, David and Santiago were all professional footballers.

In 2001, she won an international competition of the Dotto Models agency, owned by Pancho Dotto, which effectively launched her modeling career. She lent her face to national and international prestigious brands, and she consolidated as a top model in South-America. She lived in the United States and then in Europe for two years, where she worked for designers such as Roberto Cavalli and Jean-Paul Gaultier. She was the face of brands such as Zara, Ripley, Almacenes Paris, Taft, Carpisa, Scunci, and other international brands such as Pantene, Veet and Sedal.

In 2008, Liz began her career as actress. She worked in the film El Desafio, the Argentinean version of High School Musical, and then she starred in the play "Barbie Live" ., which was a clear success in Argentina, Uruguay, Peru and Brazil. In this comedy, she acts, sings and dances. In 2009 she starred in the TV series Champs 12 at América TV. The series was broadcast in Argentina, Spain, Italy, Turkey and Israel. In May 2010 she moved to London, England, where she did an acting master at the Central School of Speech and Drama. When finished, she attended advanced classes at Lamda.

In May 2011 she co-starred with Enrico Brignano in the Italian film Ex – Amici come prima! under the helm of famous director Carlo Vanzina. Afterwards, she started shooting for the TV comedy series Benvenuti a tavola – Nord vs Sud, which was broadcast in 2012 in Italy and helped her gain the Italian public recognition. In February 2012 she also shot under the direction of Adrián Caetano for his thriller film Mala. Additionally, she appeared in a recurring role for Pol-ka's TV comedy series Sos mi hombre.

She began the year 2013 shooting for two films. First she costarred in what would eventually be renowned director Diego Rafecas's last film, Ley primera ("First Law"). The film was released shortly after Rafecas' death in 2017, and it stars Armand Assante and Juan Palomino. Then she also appeared in a supporting role in Amapola (2014), which was the debut as a film director by renowned art director and production designer Eugenio Zanetti. On that same year, she starred in an episode of the anthology TV series Historias del corazón for Telefé channel.

In 2014 she was the host, together with Enrico Brignano, of "Il Meglio d'Italia", an Italian TV show broadcast by Rai 1 for the entire country. Then, she starred in Sei mai stata sulla Luna?, Paolo Genovese's romantic comedy film, which was released on January 22, 2015.

In 2016, Solari appeared in a costarring role in Estocolmo an Argentine crime thriller TV series produced by and released on Netflix. Also in 2016 she starred in Ariel Winograd's comedy film Permitidos opposite Lali Espósito and Martín Piroyansky. 2016 would also see the release of three new movies in which Solari starred or co-starred.

2019 would saw the release of the Argentine-Canadian coproduction The Last Man, Solari's first English language role in a film. The science fiction film was released first on USA in 2018, starring Harvey Keitel and Hayden Christensen.

== Gallery ==
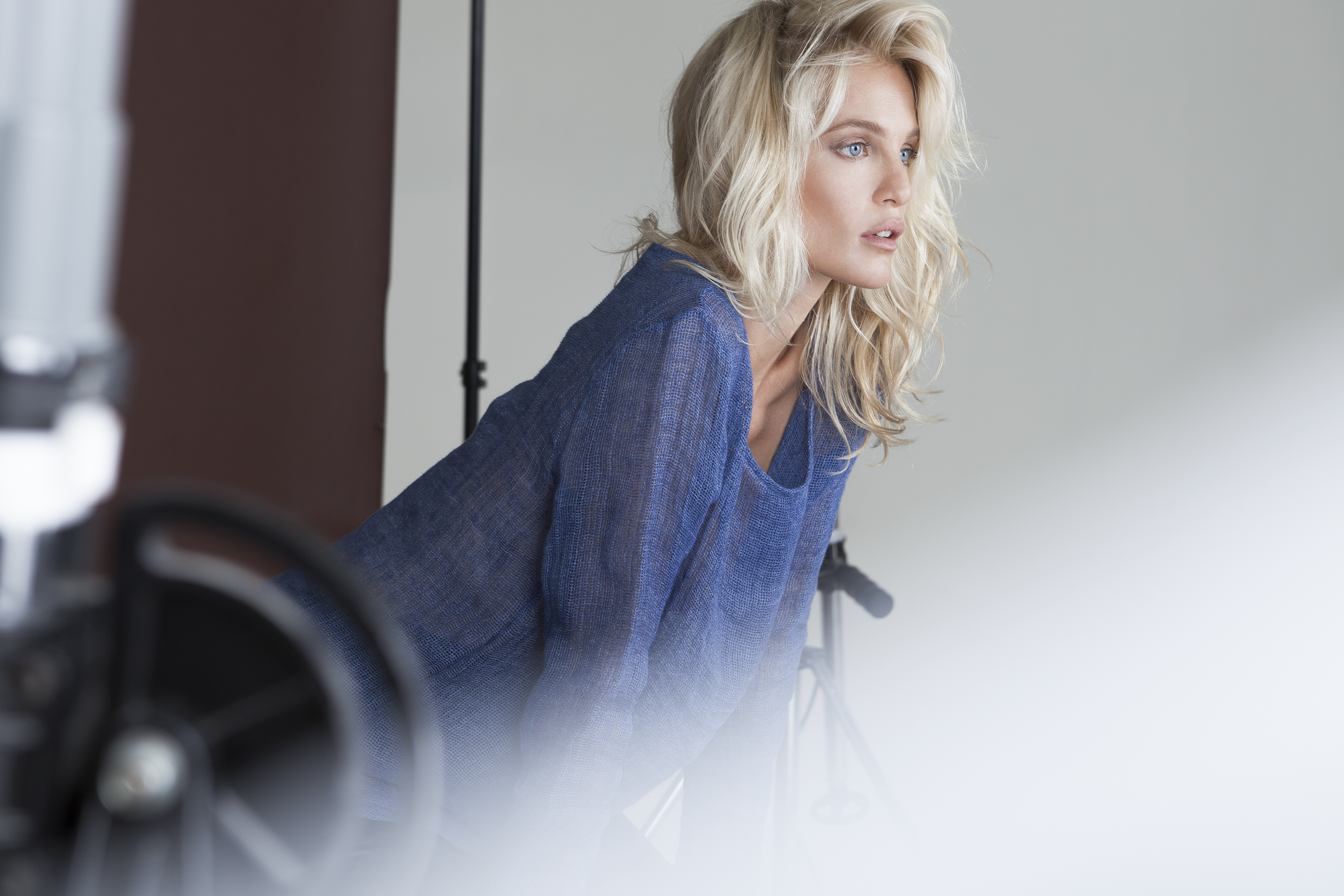

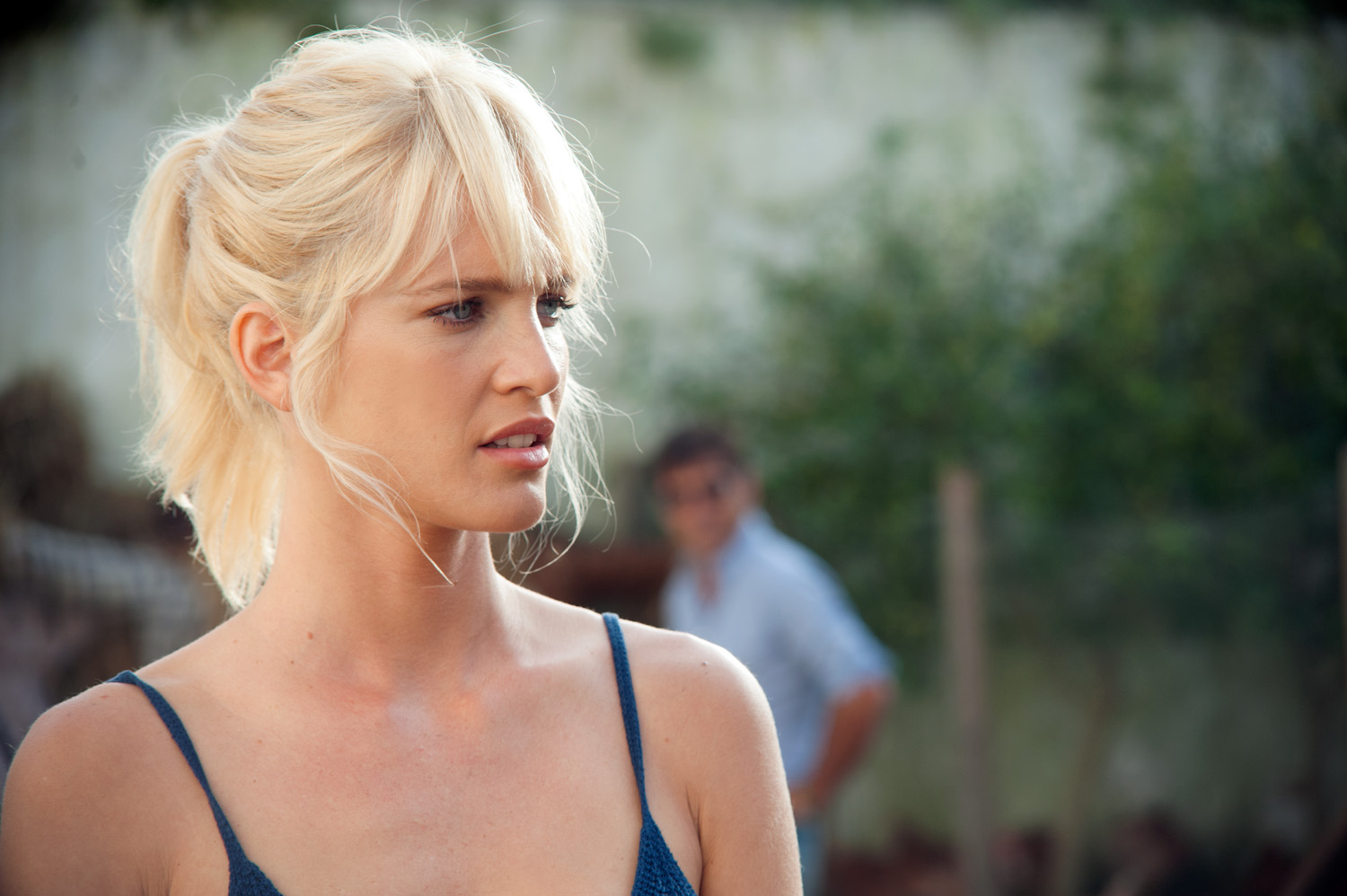

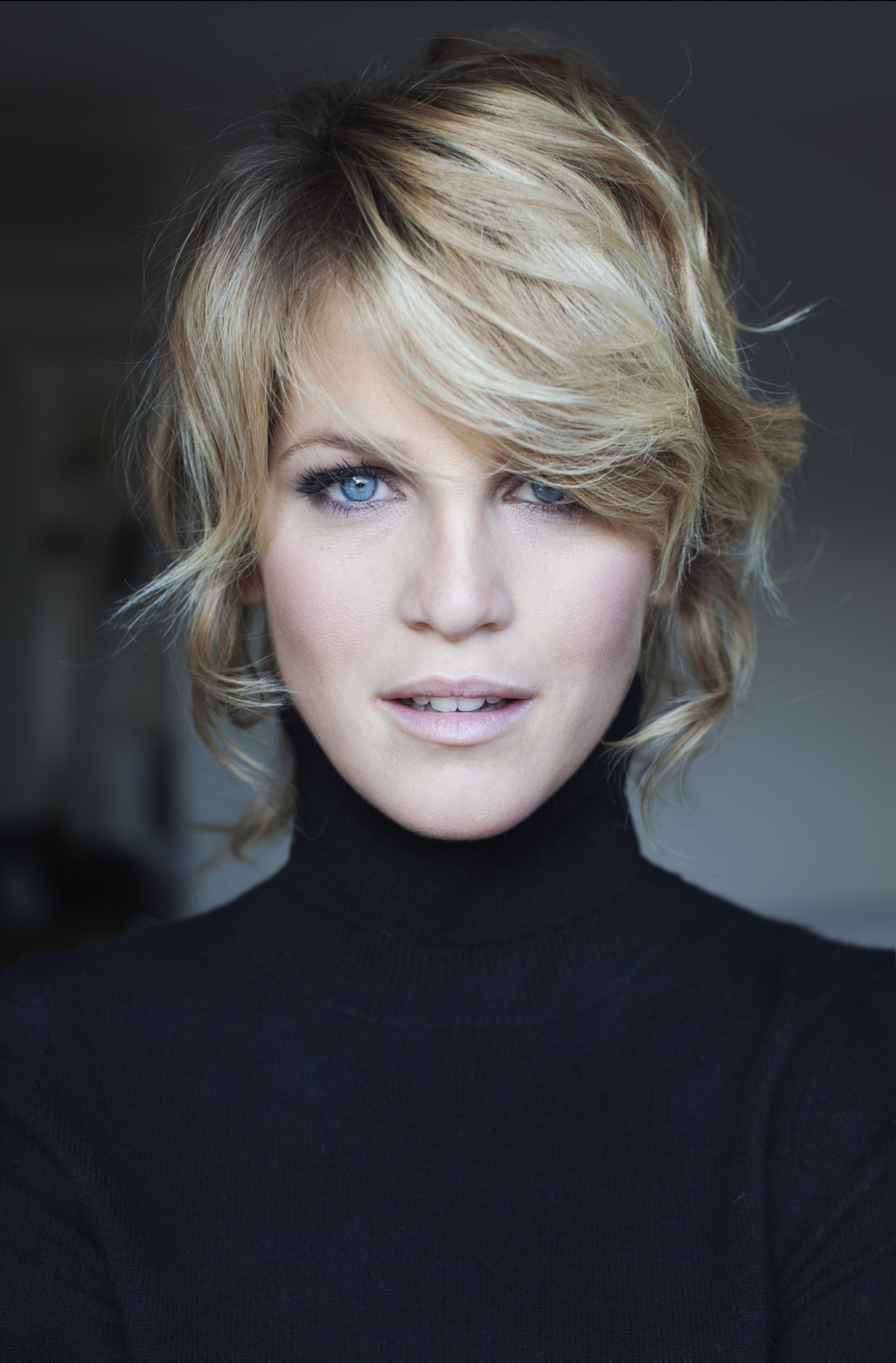

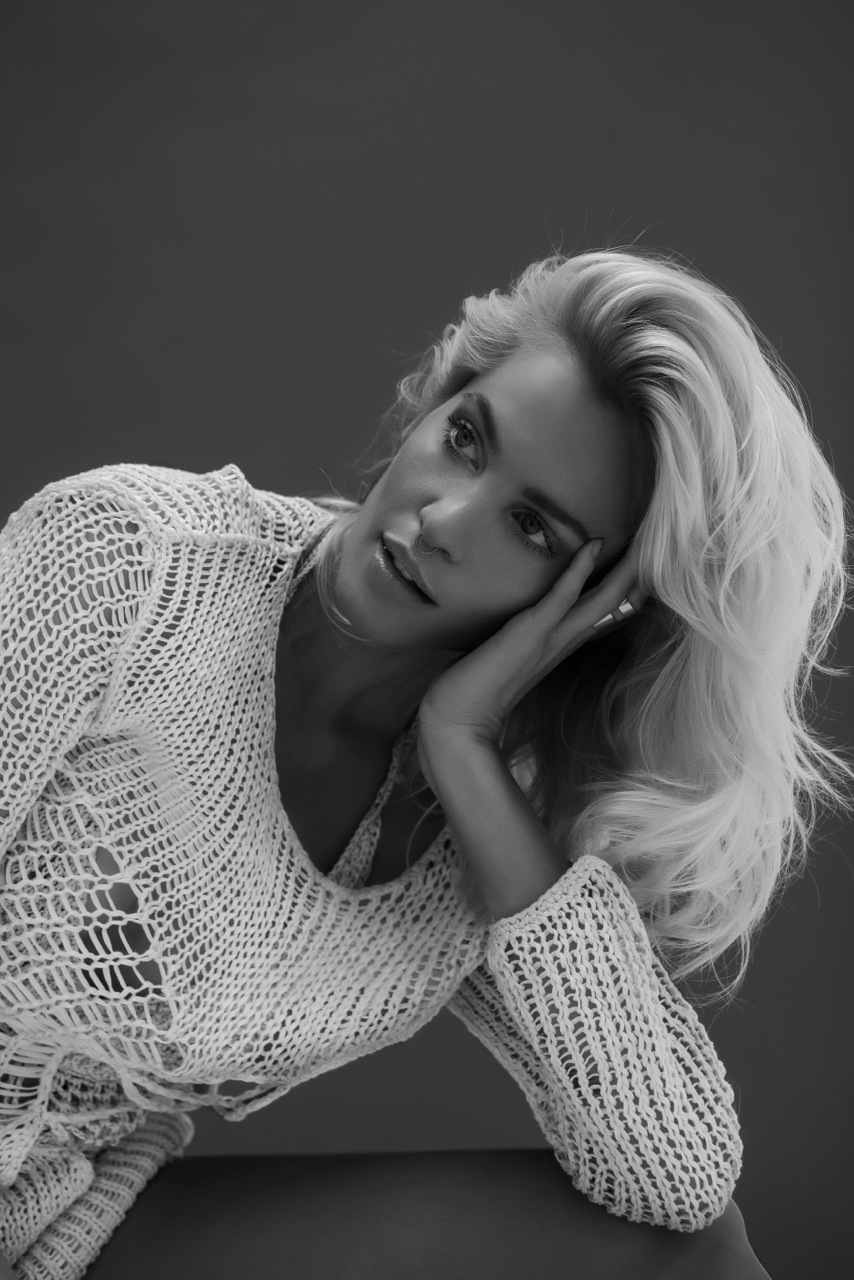

== Television, Cinema and Theatre ==
=== Television ===
Televisión
Year	Title	Channel	Role
2005	La movida del Festival	Canal 13 (Chile)	Herself (Invited)
2005	XLVI International Song Festival of Viña del Mar	Canal 13 (Chile)	Herself (Judge)
2007	Bailando por un Sueño 2007	El Trece (Argentina)	Herself (Semi-finalist)
2009	Champs 12	América (Argentina)	Charlotte
2010	Física o Química	Antena 3 (Spain)	Charlotte (Special participation in chapter 5x07 together with Tomás de las Heras)
2012	Benvenuti a Tavola	Canale 5 (Italy)	Pilar
2012	Bailando por un Sueño 2012	El Trece (Argentina)	Herself (Participant)
2012	Sos mi hombre	El Trece (Argentina)	Guadalupe Llorente
2013	Historias de Corazón	Telefe (Argentina)	Magalí Salgado. Ep. 26 "Cuidado con lo que deseas"
2014	Il meglio d'Italia	RAI 1 (Italy)	Herself (Actress and Host)
2015	Estocolmo	Netflix	Larisa

=== Films ===
Cinema
Year	Title	Country	Role
2008	High School Musical: El Desafío	Argentina	Ann Clair
2011	Ex – Amici come prima!	Italian film	Consuelo
2013	Mala	Argentina	Rosario
2013	Ley Primera	Argentinean-American Co-Production	Connie
2014	Amapola	Argentinean-American Co-Production	Loli
2015	Ever Been to the Moon?	Italian Production	Guia
2016	Permitidos	Argentinian Production	Zoe del Rio
2016	Soy tu Karma	Argentinian Production	Margarita
2016	Finché c'è prosecco c'è speranza	Italian Production	Pilar
2019	The Last Man	Canadian/Argentinian CoProduction	Jessica

=== Theatre ===
Theatre
Year	Title	Type of Play	Role
2008	Barbie Live	Musical	Barbie
