= Solare =

Solare may refer to:

- Juan María Solare, Argentine composer and pianist
- Solare (obelisk), an ancient Egyptian obelisk now in Rome
- Solare (typeface), a sans serif typeface designed by Nikolas Wrobel

== See also ==
- Solari (disambiguation)
- Solère
