= Solari =

Solari may refer to:

- Solari (surname)
- Solari (village), a village in Gabrovo Municipality, Bulgaria
- Solari Bay, Graham Land, Antarctica
- Solari, a minor character in the TV series Xena: Warrior Princess
- Solari Inc., a company founded by Catherine Austin Fitts
- Solari departure board, a popular designation for a flap display board named after the manufacturer, Solari di Udine

== See also ==
- Capitán Solari, a municipality in Chaco Province, Argentina
- Solari di Udine, an Italian company that designs and manufactures public information displays
- Solari's, a former specialty grocery store in New Orleans, Louisiana, United States
