= Tito Speranza =

Héctor Marcelo "Tito" Speranza is an Argentine personal trainer and actor of theater and television.

== Career ==
Speranza finished his studies in the technical school Confederación Suiza.

Speranza rose to fame in 2011, due to his participation in the 7th season of Bailando por un Sueño, hosted by Marcelo Tinelli. In this program, he went through different styles of dancing with partner Nadia Hair. He made it to the final, but lost to Hernán Piquín (professional dancer and actor) and Noelia Pompa.

Speranza made a brief replacement for Beto César and Melina Creco (famous tango dancer) in the 8th season of the same competition.

Speranza acted in theater for the first time in Despedida de Solteros (2011), with Nazarena Vélez, Paula Chaves and Pedro Alfonso. Later, Speranza had a role in the comedy Viaje de Locura, in Villa Carlos Paz. It premiered in the "Holiday" theater.

== Appearance ==
=== Television ===
Year	Title	Role	Note
2011	Bailando 2011	Contestant	Runner-up
2012	Concubinos	Quique	Special appearance
2012	Bailando 2012	Contestant replacement	Gala 10
2012	Sábado Show	Official referee	Segment: "¿Cuál es tu Récord?"
2014	Combate	Coach of Red Team	season 1
2014–2018	Combate	Coach of the teams	
2014	Bailando 2014	Celebrity guest by Pedro Alfosnso	Gala 8
2015	Bailando 2015	Celebrity guest by Ailen Bechara	Gala 9
2017	Bailando 2017	Celebrity guest by Christian Sancho	Gala 4
2022	Turno Tarde	Physical education teacher	

=== Cinema ===
Year	Title	Role	Note
2014	Bañeros 4: Los Rompeolas	El Tito	Special appearance

== Personal life ==
Speranza married personal trainer and former bodybuilder, Marcela Villagra on December 7, 2012, in San Benito's church, Palermo, Buenos Aires.
