= That's Not Cheating =

- Argentine theatrical release poster
- Permitidos
- Directed by: Ariel Winograd
- Written by: Gabriel Korenfeld; Julian Loyola
- Produced by: Ricardo Freixa; Joana D’Alessio; Nathalie Cabiron
- Starring: Lali Espósito; Martín Piroyansky; Liz Solari; Benjamín Vicuña
- Edited by: Alejandro Brodersohn
- Music by: Darío Eskenazi
- Production companies: Patagonik Film Group; Tresplanos Cine
- Distributed by: Walt Disney Studios Motion Pictures
- Release date: 4 August 2016 (Argentina)
- Running time: 106 minutes
- Country: Argentina
- Language: Spanish
- Box office: $1.9 million

That's Not Cheating (Spanish: Permitidos) is a 2016 Argentine comedy film directed by Ariel Winograd and co-written by Julian Loyola and Gabriel Korenfeld. The film, which stars Lali Espósito and Martín Piroyansky, was theatrically released on 4 August 2016.

Due to its success, the film has been sold to other Latin American markets, including Peru, Ecuador, Bolivia and Chile. Rights for pay TV has been acquired by HBO Latino for the United States, Movistar+ for Spain, and Medyavision for Turkey. According to FilmSharks, rights for France, Mexico, Brazil, Australia and Germany are in advanced discussions.

== Synopsis ==
The comedy follows a modern couple who joke with friends about the idea of a "One Night Pass" — one night of passion with a famous star that would not be considered infidelity. Then the husband unexpectedly meets his "One Night Pass". A series of funny complications won't allow Mateo and Camila to get back together. Both of them will have to take a look of several things and raffle off every absurd obstacle that there will be presented from the appearance of this "One Night Pass" in their lives. Once involved in a dangerous situation, the couple will have the opportunity to discover themselves.

== Cast ==
- Lali Espósito as Camila Boecchi
- Martín Piroyansky as Mateo Borisonik
- Liz Solari as Zoe del Río
- Benjamín Vicuña as Joaquín Campos
- Guillermo Arengo as Antonio Boecchi
- Ana Pauls as Paula
- Maruja Bustamante as Soledad
- Gastón Cocchiarale as Rama
- Abel Ayala as El Kun
- Pablo Rago as Doctor

== Reception ==
=== Box office ===
Permitidos was #2 on opening weekend on its original country, Argentina, behind The Secret Life of Pets with $0.7 million. The movie has eventually grossed $1.7 million only in Argentina (AR$25.3 million).

=== Critical response ===
Permitidos received generally positive reviews from critics. The review aggregator website Todas Las Críticas assigned the film a weighted average score of 67 out of 100, based on 42 critics, indicating "generally favorable reviews".

In his review for Leer Cine, Santiago García praised the film, saying: "it is a funny comedy, it is a well-filmed comedy, it is not the mere illustration of amusing dialogues, Permitidos is a complete film". Emiliano Basile of Escribiendo Cine also gave the film a positive review, writing: "Permitidos is effective by more than it floods in some lapses by the excess situations. It is [effective] because its goal of smooth and flat entertainment wards off of the traditional conservative moralizing. CineFreak's Alex Arellano gave the film a positive review, stating: "Permitidos is a genuine comedy, a film whose script is an elaborated swarm of absurd and crazy situations, which managed to combine and create consistency between every scene and every word of the script. It is a risky proposition that could have been a big frustration. However, its director decided to focus on the humor, and if the audience judges it [the film], it will undoubtedly have a good reception. Fernando Alvarez of Todo lo ve highlighted Espósito and Piroyanky's performance and wrote: "it is a well-executed, agile comedy that counts with solid technical resources and a delirium that the viewer will have to play, between ducks, geese and a smarter friend that he looks". Meanwhile, Diego Alvarez from Cuatro Bastardos gave the film a perfect score (10 out of 10) recognizing Winograd's direction and Piroyansky's performance, which he describes as "impeccable", and Espósito's, adding that the actress is an actoral revelation and that her performance "will surely remain in the records of argentinian cinema". Fer Casals of Meta magazine compared the film with Hollywood comedies, saying: "Ariel Winograd newest movie surprises from its freshness and naturalness represented by the charm of its protagonists". Variety's John Hopewell wrote that the film is "the latest in a line of high-concept Argentine comedies of manners with international potential."

== Release history ==
List of release dates, distributor and reference
Region	Date	Distributor	Ref.
Argentina	4 August 2016	Walt Disney Studios Motion Pictures	
Uruguay	18 August 2016	Walt Disney Studios Motion Pictures	
Paraguay	25 August 2016	Filmagic	
Peru	3 November 2016	Delta Films	
Bolivia	1 December 2016	Distrifilms	
Ecuador	23 December 2016	Walt Disney Studios Motion Pictures	
Israel	9 March 2017	United King Films	
France			
China			
