= Ever Been to the Moon? =

- Directed by: Paolo Genovese
- Written by: Paolo Genovese; Pietro Calderoni; Gualtiero Rosella
- Story by: Enrico Vanzina; Paolo Genovese; Carlo Vanzina; Riccardo Milani; Alessio Maria Federici
- Starring: Raoul Bova; Liz Solari; Sabrina Impacciatore; Neri Marcorè; Giulia Michelini; Sergio Rubini; Emilio Solfrizzi; Pietro Sermonti; Nino Frassica; Paolo Sassanelli
- Cinematography: Fabrizio Lucci
- Music by: Francesco De Gregori
- Distributed by: 01 Distribution
- Release date: January 22, 2015
- Running time: 90 minutes
- Language: Italian

Ever Been to the Moon? (Italian: Sei mai stata sulla Luna?) is a 2015 Italian romantic comedy film written and directed by Paolo Genovese and starring Raoul Bova and Liz Solari. The theme song "Sei mai stata sulla Luna?" by Francesco De Gregori won the Nastro d'Argento for Best Song.

== Plot ==
Guia is young, very beautiful and a journalist who runs a fashion magazine between Milan and Paris. Working with her are her opportunistic partner Marco and her trusted collaborator Carola. When Guia's father dies, she inherits an old farm in Puglia. So she decides to go to the farm to sell this unusual inheritance for her, who is actually a snobbish and cynical woman. But it will prove to be not so simple, succeeding in the task of getting rid of it. Around the farm she will cross paths with many characteristic personalities: her cousin Pino (a great Neri Marcorè), an intellectually disabled man who in the end turns out to be the wisest of all; the farm's farmer Renzo who raises the child Toni; the two competing bartenders Felice and Delfo with their helper Mara, a disenchanted romantic always looking for love on the net but in a faraway country; Rosario, a butcher and real estate agent. Will Guia together with the trusty Carola and Mara herself manage to fool their temperament and their mistaken certainties and fall in love?

== Cast ==
- Raoul Bova as Renzo
- Liz Solari as Giulia
- Simone Dell'Anna as Tony
- Giulia Michelini as Carola
- Pietro Sermonti as Marco
- Dino Abbrescia as Dino
- Anna Rezan as Cinzia
- Nino Frassica as Oderzo
- Sabrina Impacciatore as Mara
- Neri Marcorè as Pino
- Rolando Ravello as Paolo
- Sergio Rubini as Delfo
- Emilio Solfrizzi as Felice
- Paolo Sassanelli as Rosario

== See also ==
- List of Italian films of 2015
