= Augusto Solari =

Argentine footballer (born 1992)

Personal information
- Full name: Augusto Jorge Mateo Solari
- Date of birth: 3 January 1992 (age 34)
- Place of birth: Rosario, Argentina
- Height: 1.80 m (5 ft 11 in)
- Position: Winger

Team information
- Current team: Unión Santa Fe
- Number: 23

Youth career
- River Plate

Senior career*
Years	Team	Apps	(Gls)
2012–2017	River Plate	37	(1)
2016–2017	→ Estudiantes (loan)	44	(5)
2017–2021	Racing Club	48	(9)
2021–2023	Celta	38	(2)
2023–2024	Atlas	22	(2)
2024–2025	Rosario Central	14	(0)
2025–	Unión Santa Fe	24	(1)
- * Club domestic league appearances and goals as of 17:30, 22 November 2026 (UTC)

Augusto Jorge Mateo Solari (born 3 January 1992) is an Argentine professional footballer who plays for Unión Santa Fe as a right winger.

== Career ==
Born in Rosario, Solari began his career at River Plate and was a member of the sides that won the 2013–14 Primera División, 2014 Copa Sudamericana and 2015 Copa Libertadores titles, among others. He scored his only goal for La Banda on 29 March 2015 in a 3–2 win at Gimnasia.

At the end of 2015, Solari was loaned for a year to Nelson Vivas' Estudiantes. In February 2017, this agreement was extended for a further year. On 25 May, he scored the only goal of a home win over Botafogo in the Copa Libertadores group stage, though the team did not advance.

In July 2017, Solari transferred to Racing Club on a four-year deal, after being removed from Marcelo Gallardo's plans. The following 6 May, on his return to Estudiantes, he was sent off after 39 minutes of a 2–1 win. He added another league title to his tally in 2018–19; he contributed a career-best five goals to their campaign.

On 23 January 2021, Solari joined La Liga club Celta on a 2 1/2-year deal. He was signed by his former Racing manager Eduardo Coudet, for a fee of €500,000. He made his debut on 1 February in a goalless draw at Granada, replacing Nolito after an hour. His first goal concluded a 2–0 home win over Levante, nine minutes after coming on for fellow scorer Brais Méndez.

== Personal life ==
Solari comes from a footballing background — his grandfather is Jorge Solari and he is a cousin of brothers Santiago, Esteban and David.

== Career statistics ==
As of match played 22 April 2023

Appearances and goals by club, season and competition
Club	Season	League			National cup		Continental		Other		Total	
Club	Season	Division	Apps	Goals	Apps	Goals	Apps	Goals	Apps	Goals	Apps	Goals
River Plate	2012–13	Argentine Primera División	4	0	1	0	0	0	—		5	0
River Plate	2013–14	Argentine Primera División	8	0	3	0	9 (Note: Appearance(s) in Copa Sudamericana)	0	1 (Note: Appearance(s) in Supercopa Argentina)	0	21	0
River Plate	2014–15	Argentine Primera División	10	0	0	0	1 (Note: Appearance(s) in Copa Libertadores)	0	—		11	0
River Plate	2015	Argentine Primera División	15	1	0	0	0	0	—		15	1
River Plate	Total		37	1	4	0	10	0	1	0	52	1
Estudiantes (loan)	2016	Argentine Primera División	16	2	3	0	2	0	1 (Note: Appearance(s) in Copa Libertadores Playoffs)	0	22	2
Estudiantes (loan)	2016–17	Argentine Primera División	28	3	1	0	4	1	—		33	4
Estudiantes (loan)	Total		44	5	4	0	6	1	1	0	55	6
Racing Club	2017–18	Argentine Primera División	18	2	2	0	4	0	—		24	2
Racing Club	2018–19	Argentine Primera División	20	5	1	0	5	1	—		26	6
Racing Club	2019–20	Argentine Primera División	4	1	1	0	2	0	4 (Note: Appearance(s) in Copa de la Superliga Argentina)	0	11	1
Racing Club	2020	Copa de la Liga Profesional	6	1	0	0	5	0	—		11	1
Racing Club	Total		48	9	4	0	16	1	4	0	72	10
Celta	2020–21	La Liga	16	2	0	0	—		—		16	2
Celta	2021–22	La Liga	26	0	1	1	—		—		27	1
Celta	2022–23	La Liga	12	0	0	0	—		—		12	0
Celta	Total		54	2	1	1	0	0	0	0	55	3
Career total			183	17	13	1	32	2	6	0	234	20

== Honours ==
River Plate

- Copa Libertadores: 2015
- Copa Sudamericana: 2014
- Argentine Primera División: Final 2013–14, Superfinal 2013–14
- J.League Cup / Copa Sudamericana Championship: 2015
- Supercopa Euroamericana: 2015
- U-20 Copa Libertadores: 2012

Racing Club

- Argentine Primera División: 2018–19
