= Solère =

Solère is a French surname. Notable people with the surname include:

- Pedro Étienne Solère (1753–1817), French composer, teacher and clarinetist
- Thierry Solère (born 1971), French politician

== See also ==
- Solare
- Solari (surname)
