= Bailando 2012 =

Eighth Argentinean season of Bailando por un Sueño

- Season 2012
- The cast of Bailando 2012
- Presented by: Marcelo Tinelli

Release
- Original network: El Trece
- Original release: 11 June – 22 December 2012

Season chronology
- ← Previous; Bailando 2011 Next → Bailando 2014

Bailando 2012 was the eighth Argentinean season of Bailando por un Sueño. The first show of the season aired on 11 June 2012 on El Trece, with Marcelo Tinelli as host and 30 couples competing.

The jury were Carmen Barbieri, Anibal Pachano, Antonio Gasalla, Moria Casán, Flavio Mendoza and Marcelo Polino. Though Gasalla had been a guest judge in season 5, this was his first time as a permanent judge; however, he left the show in round 10. Santiago Bal was also confirmed as a judge, but he recused himself before the beginning of the show at the request of his son, Federico Bal, who was a contestant.

This was the first season to feature three disabled contestants: Noelia Pompa (dwarfism), Ayelén Barreiro (Down syndrome) and Reinaldo Ojeda (leg amputee). Verónica Perdomo is also a special case, as she is a cerebrovascular disease survivor.

Noelia Pompa and Hernán Piquín won for the second year in a row.

== Couples ==
| Celebrity | Notability | Professional Partner | Status |
|---|---|---|---|
| Leandro Penna | Model | Macarena Rinaldi | Eliminated 1st by the 43.68% |
| Sergio "Maravilla" Martínez | Boxer | – | Withdrew |
| Jennifer Owczarczyn | TV Personality | Agustín Morgante | Eliminated 2nd by the 48.13% |
| Mariano de la Canal | Soñando por Bailar 2012 Runner-up | Nadia Hair | Eliminated 3rd by the 45.88% |
| Micaela Breque | Andres Calamaro's Girlfriend | Juan Pablo Battaglia | Eliminated 4th by the 44.51% |
| Grecia Colmenares | Actress | Juan Leandro Nimo | Eliminated 5th by the 46.79% |
| Valeria Archimó | Vedette | – | Withdrew |
| Ayelén Barreiro | Skater | Franco Cadelago | Eliminated 6th by the 47.17% |
| Ayelén Barreiro | Professional dancer | Franco Cadelago | Eliminated 6th by the 47.17% |
| Ana Sans | Theatre director Anibal Pachano's ex-wife | Nicolás Armengol | Eliminated 7th by the 12.43% |
| Marcela Villagra | Héctor "Tito" Speranza's wife | Cristian Falcón | Eliminated 8th by the 42.29% |
| Ayelén Paleo | Vedette | Emanuel González | Eliminated 9th by the 13.03% |
| Marcela Feudale | Journalist | Facundo Mazzei | Eliminated 10th by the 27.29% |
| Liz Solari | Top Model | Daniel Meza Sánchez | Withdrew |
| Florencia "Floppy" Tesouro | TV Personality | Christian Ponce | Eliminated 11th by the 41.16% |
| Karina Jelinek^{[c]} | Model | – | Withdrew |
| Charlotte Caniggia | Claudio Caniggia's daughter | Alejandro Gallego | Eliminated 12th by the 45.74% |
| Adabel Guerrero^{[b]} | Vedette | Reinaldo Ojeda | Eliminated 13th by the 40.12% |
| Adabel Guerrero^{[b]} | Dancer | Reinaldo Ojeda | Eliminated 13th by the 40.12% |
| Beto César | Comedian | Melina Greco | Eliminated 14th by the 48.04% |
| María Vázquez | Model | Marcos Gorosito | Eliminated 15th by the 34.24% |
| Cristian Urrizaga | Gran Hermano 2011 winner | Laura Fernández | Eliminated 16th by the 43.11% |
| Verónica Perdomo | Television presenter | Pablo Juín | Eliminated 17th by the 47.56% |
| Alexander Caniggia^{[a]} | Claudio Caniggia's son | Sofía Macaggi | Eliminated 18th by the 40.44% |
| Alexandra Larsson^{[d]} | Model | Maximiliano D'Iorio | Eliminated 19th by the 48.17% |
| Andrea Rincón | Vedette | Pier Fritzsche | Eliminated 20th by the 43.24% |
| Federico Bal | Carmen Barbieri's son | Yanil García | Eliminated 21st by the 30.48% |
| Matías Alé | Actor Television personality | Soledad Bayona | Eliminated 22nd by the 44.33% |
| Florencia Peña | Actress | Nicolás Scillama | Semifinalists by the 44.88% |
| Paula Chaves | Top Model | Pedro "Peter" Alfonso | Semifinalists by the 49.71% |
| Paula Chaves | Actor | Pedro "Peter" Alfonso | Semifinalists by the 49.71% |
| Magdalena Bravi | Soñando por Bailar 2 Winner Dancer | Jorge Moliniers | Runners-Up by the 49.47% |
| Hernán Piquín | Dancer | Noelia Pompa | Winners by the 50.53% |
| Hernán Piquín | Singer | Noelia Pompa | Winners by the 50.53% |

- ^[a] Sergio "Maravilla" Martínez left the competition, and Alexander Caniggia entered in his place.
- ^[b] Valeria Archimó left the competition, and Adabel Guerrero entered in her place.
- ^[c] Liz Solari left the competition, and Karina Jelinek entered in her place.
- ^[d] Karina Jelinek left the competition, and Alexandra Larsson entered in her place.

== Scoring chart ==
| Celebrity | Place | | | | | | | | | | | | | | | | | | | | | | | |
| Celebrity | Place | Six judges | | | | | | | | | | Five judges | | | | | | | | | | | | |
| Celebrity | Place | 01 | 02 | 03 | 04 | 05 | 06 | 07 | 08 | 09 | 10 | 11 | 12 | 13 | 14 | 15 | 16 | 17 | 18 | 19 | 20 | Semifinals | | Final |
| Celebrity | Place | 01 | 02 | 03 | 04 | 05 | 06 | 07 | 08 | 09 | 10 | 11 | 12 | 13 | 14 | 15 | 16 | 17 | 18 | 19 | 20 | 1 | 2 | Final |
|---|---|---|---|---|---|---|---|---|---|---|---|---|---|---|---|---|---|---|---|---|---|---|---|---|
| Hernán & Noelia | 1 | 53 | 48 | 59 | 58 | 36 | 56 | 54 | 60 | 59 | 55 | 38 | 47 | 46 | 34 | 50 | 45 | 41 | 49 | 50 | SAFE | 7 | | 7 |
| Magdalena | 2 | 52 | 34 | 53 | 37 | 36 | 58 | 36 | 46 | 44 | 59 | 42 | 37 | 42 | 50 | 33 | 41 | 46 | 49 | 48 | SAFE | | 7 | 1 |
| Peter & Paula | 3/4 | 35 | 44 | 43 | 49 | 52 | 52 | 51^{[5]} | 57 | 45 | 53 | 46 | 41 | 33 | 30 | 39 | 43 | * | * | 40 | SAFE | | 1 | |
| Florencia | 3/4 | 46 | 51 | 44 | 48 | 45 | 47 | 50 | 60 | 28 | 44 | 41 | 42 | 43 | 47 | 43 | 39 | 42 | 50^{[9]} | * | SAFE | 1 | | |
| Matías | 5 | 44 | 48 | 34 | 47 | 34 | 46 | 55 | 41 | 54 | 54 | 30 | 37 | 48 | 40 | 39 | 44 | 38 | 42 | 46 | ELIM | | | |
| Federico | 6 | 52 | 22 | 40 | 42 | 39 | 42 | 39 | 48 | 56 | 50 | 42 | 47 | 45 | 38 | 45 | 41 | 38 | 41 | 47 | | | | |
| Andrea | 7 | 42 | 45 | 44 | 41 | 58 | 44 | 31 | 32 | 44 | 50 | 42 | 37 | 48 | 34 | 32 | 41 | 34 | 38 | | | | | |
| Alexandra | 8 | | | | | | | | | | | 39 | 42 | 42 | 39 | 40 | 39 | 40 | | | | | | |
| Alexander | 9 | | | 47 | 50 | 38 | 28 | 48 | 45 | 46 | 33 | 50 | 33 | 21 | 34 | 32 | 34 | | | | | | | |
| Verónica | 10 | 60 | 50 | 32 | 37 | 51 | 45 | 45 | 45 | 44 | 52 | 27 | 41 | 45 | 41 | 33 | | | | | | | | |
| Cristian | 11 | 30 | 30 | 42 | 30 | 53 | 32 | 21 | 51 | 44 | 44 | 30 | 44 | 42 | 37 | | | | | | | | | |
| María | 12 | 37 | 47 | 55 | 54 | 57 | 59 | 58 | 57 | 59 | 44 | 31 | 37 | 25^{[8]} | | | | | | | | | | |
| Beto | 13 | 41 | 29 | 36 | 30 | 42 | 46 | 42 | 48 | 28 | 44^{[7]} | 27 | 28 | | | | | | | | | | | |
| Adabel & Reinaldo | 14 | 53 | 54 | 51 | 42 | 56^{[2]} | 38 | 39^{[4]} | 57 | 45 | 58 | 17 | | | | | | | | | | | | |
| Charlotte | 15 | 22 | 33 | 40 | 41 | 21 | 38 | * | 47 | 50 | 25 | | | | | | | | | | | | | |
| Karina | N/A | | | | | | | | | | 51 | | | | | | | | | | | | | |
| Floppy | 16 | 38 | 44 | 51^{[1]} | 33 | 41 | 44 | 39 | 32 | 33 | | | | | | | | | | | | | | |
| Liz | N/A | 48 | 46 | 41 | 41 | 58 | 55 | 58 | 58^{[6]} | 44 | | | | | | | | | | | | | | |
| Marcela F. | 17 | 41 | 45 | 48 | 33 | 38 | 43 | 44 | 32 | | | | | | | | | | | | | | | |
| Ayelén P. | 18 | 36 | 37 | 39 | 40 | 41 | 47 | 55 | 41 | | | | | | | | | | | | | | | |
| Marcela V. | 19 | 46 | 30 | 45 | 38 | 42 | 32 | 36 | | | | | | | | | | | | | | | | |
| Ana | 20 | 40 | 45 | 53 | 54 | 41 | 41 | 31 | | | | | | | | | | | | | | | | |
| Ayelén B. & Franco | 21 | 46 | 37 | 53 | 48 | 49^{[3]} | 32 | | | | | | | | | | | | | | | | | |
| Valeria | N/A | 53 | 54 | 51 | 42 | 56^{[2]} | 38 | | | | | | | | | | | | | | | | | |
| Grecia | 22 | 22 | 34 | 39 | 33 | 26 | | | | | | | | | | | | | | | | | | |
| Micaela | 23 | 24 | 30 | 43 | 37 | | | | | | | | | | | | | | | | | | | |
| Mariano | 24 | 34 | 34 | 28 | | | | | | | | | | | | | | | | | | | | |
| Jennifer | 25 | 38 | 25 | | | | | | | | | | | | | | | | | | | | | |
| Maravilla | N/A | 30 | 49 | | | | | | | | | | | | | | | | | | | | | |
| Leandro | 26 | 24 | | | | | | | | | | | | | | | | | | | | | | |

Red numbers indicate the lowest score for each week.
Green numbers indicate the highest score for each week.
indicates the couple eliminated that week.
indicates the couple was saved by the public.
indicates the couple was saved by the jury.
indicates the couple withdrew.
indicates the winning couple.
indicates the runner-up couple.
indicates the semifinalists couples.

- From the round 7 Valeria Archimó was replaced by Adabel Guerrero.
- From the round 18 Paula Chaves was replaced by Vanesa García Millán.
- In round 7, Charlotte Caniggia was sentenced because she stopped her routines in the middle of the choreography.
- In round 17, Paula & Peter were sentenced since they weren't able to dance due Paula's lesion.
- In round 18, Peter & Vanessa couldn't finish their choreography because Peter was injured in the middle of the choreography.
- In round 18, Florencia Peña was sentenced because she stopped her routine in the middle of the choreography.
- ^[1] replaced by Silvina Escudero.
- ^[2] Valeria Archimó was replaced by Adabel Guerrero.
- ^[3] Ayelén Barreiro was replaced by Karina Jelinek.
- ^[4] Adabel Guerrero was replaced by Belén Francese.
- ^[5] Paula Chaves was replaced by Karina Jelinek.
- ^[6] replaced by Cinthia Fernández.
- ^[7] replaced by Tito Speranza.
- ^[8] replaced by Karina Jelinek.
- ^[9] replaced by Lolo Rossi.

=== Highest and lowest scoring performances ===
The best and worst performances in each dance according to the judges' marks are as follows:

| Dance | Best dancer(s) | Best score | Worst dancer(s) | Worst score |
|---|---|---|---|---|
| Disco | Verónica Perdomo | 60 | Charlotte Caniggia; Grecia Colmenares | 22 |
| Reggaeton | Valeria Archimó & Reinaldo Ojeda | 54 | Federico Bal | 22 |
| Bio-sphere | Hernán Piquín & Noelia Pompa | 59 | Mariano de la Canal | 28 |
| Argentine cumbia | Hernán Piquín & Noelia Pompa | 58 | Beto César; Cristian Urrizaga | 30 |
| Strip dance | Andrea Rincón; Liz Solari | 58 | Charlotte Caniggia | 21 |
| Cuarteto | María Vázquez | 59 | Alexander Caniggia | 28 |
| Latin pop | María Vázquez; Liz Solari | 58 | Cristian Urrizaga | 21 |
| Aquadance | Florencia Peña; Hernán Piquín & Noelia Pompa | 60 | Andrea Rincón; Florencia "Floppy" Tesouro; Marcela Feudale | 32 |
| Music video | Hernán Piquín & Noelia Pompa; María Vázquez | 59 | Beto César; Florencia Peña | 28 |
| Arabic music | Magdalena Bravi | 59 | Charlotte Caniggia | 25 |
| Electro dance | Alexander Caniggia | 50 | Adabel Guerrero & Reinaldo Ojeda | 17 |
| Pole dance | Federico Bal; Hernán Piquín & Noelia Pompa | 47 | Beto César | 28 |
| Freestyle | Andrea Rincón; Matías Alé | 48 | Alexander Caniggia | 21 |
| Adagio from Telenovelas | Magdalena Bravi | 50 | Paula Chaves & Peter Alfonso | 30 |
| Merengue | Hernán Piquín & Noelia Pompa | 50 | Alexander Caniggia; Andrea Rincón | 32 |
| Rock and Roll | Hernán Piquín & Noelia Pompa | 45 | Alexander Caniggia | 34 |
| Rotating Room | Magdalena Bravi | 46 | Andrea Rincón | 34 |
| Ballet | Lolo Rossi | 50 | Andrea Rincón | 38 |
| Salsa | Hernán Piquín & Noelia Pompa | 50 | Pedro "Peter" Alfonso & Vanesa García Millán | 40 |

== Styles, scores and songs ==
Secret vote is in bold text.

=== June ===
Disco and Reggaeton
| Date | Couple | Style | Song | Score | | | | | | Total |
| Date | Couple | Style | Song | Carmen | Flavio | Moria | Aníbal | Antonio | Marcelo | Total |
|---|---|---|---|---|---|---|---|---|---|---|
| 11 June | Florencia & Nicolás | Disco | Pussycat Dolls – "Hush Hush" | **8** | 7 | 6 | 8 | 7 | 10 | 46 |
| 12 June | Liz & Daniel | Disco | The Trammps – "Disco Inferno" | **9** | 9 | 8 | 8 | 10 | 4 | 48 |
| 12 June | Maravilla & Sofía | Disco | Kool & the Gang – "Celebration" | **6** | 7 | 4 | 4 | 6 | 3 | 30 |
| 12 June | Ayelén P. & Emanuel | Disco | ABBA – "Voulez-Vous" | **5** | 6 | 7 | 6 | 7 | 5 | 36 |
| 14 June | Marcela V. & Cristian | Disco | Sylvester – "You Make Me Feel (Mighty Real)" | **10** | 10 | 8 | 6 | 8 | 4 | 46 |
| 14 June | Leandro & Macarena | Disco | Village People – "Just a Gigolo" | **4** | 6 | 4 | 3 | 4 | 3 | 24 |
| 14 June | María & Marcos | Disco | Bee Gees – "You Should Be Dancing" | **8** | 7 | 6 | 6 | 6 | 4 | 37 |
| 14 June | Marcela F. & Facundo | Disco | Laura Branigan – "Gloria" | **7** | 8 | 7 | 5 | 9 | 5 | 41 |
| 14 June | Federico & Yanil | Disco | Earth, Wind & Fire – "Boogie Wonderland" | **10** | 10 | 10 | 7 | 10 | 5 | 52 |
| 15 June | Mariano & Nadia | Disco | Mika – "Love Today" | **6** | 6 | 6 | 6 | 7 | 3 | 34 |
| 15 June | Valeria & Reinaldo | Disco | Donna Summer – "Last Dance" | **10** | 10 | 7 | 7 | 9 | 10 | 53 |
| 15 June | Cristian & Laura | Disco | Donna Summer – "Hot Stuff" | **7** | 5 | 6 | 3 | 6 | 3 | 30 |
| 15 June | Micaela & Juan P. | Disco | Michael Jackson – "Don't Stop 'til You Get Enough" | **4** | 2 | 7 | 3 | 5 | 3 | 24 |
| 18 June | Paula & Peter | Disco | Cher – "Strong Enough" | **7** | 7 | 6 | 6 | 5 | 4 | 35 |
| 18 June | Ayelén B. & Franco | Disco | Madonna – "Hung Up" | **8** | 7 | 7 | 7 | 10 | 7 | 46 |
| 18 June | Jennifer & Agustín | Disco | Earth, Wind & Fire – "September" | **7** | 7 | 6 | 6 | 7 | 5 | 38 |
| 19 June | Grecia & Juan Leandro | Disco | Gloria Gaynor – "Never Can Say Goodbye" | **4** | 5 | 4 | 3 | 4 | 2 | 22 |
| 19 June | Charlotte & Alejandro | Disco | Kym Mazelle – "Young Hearts Run Free" | **4** | 2 | 5 | 2 | 7 | 2 | 22 |
| 19 June | Beto & Melina | Disco | Macy Gray – "Sexual Revolution" | **8** | 7 | 10 | 5 | 8 | 3 | 41 |
| 19 June | Magdalena & Jorge | Disco | Patrick Hernandez – "Born to be Alive" | **10** | 9 | 8 | 6 | 9 | 10 | 52 |
| 22 June | Hernán & Noelia | Disco | Jamiroquai – "Canned Heat" | **10** | 10 | 10 | 8 | 10 | 5 | 53 |
| 22 June | Verónica & Pablo | Disco | Gloria Gaynor – "Can't Take My Eyes Off You" | **10** | 10 | 10 | 10 | 10 | 10 | 60 |
| 22 June | Matías & Soledad | Disco | Village People – "YMCA" | **10** | 8 | 8 | 5 | 7 | 6 | 44 |
| 25 June | Ana & Nicolás | Disco | Village People – "In the Navy" | **8** | 8 | 6 | 7 | 8 | 3 | 40 |
| 25 June | Andrea & Pier | Disco | Donna Summer – "On the Radio" | **8** | 7 | 9 | 6 | 7 | 5 | 42 |
| 25 June | Floppy & Christian | Disco | Thelma Houston – "Don't Leave Me This Way" | **8** | 7 | 7 | 6 | 6 | 4 | 38 |
| 28 June | Liz & Daniel | Reggaeton | Daddy Yankee – "El Ritmo No Perdona" | 10 | **8** | 8 | 7 | 9 | 4 | 46 |
| 28 June | Maravilla & Sofía | Reggaeton | Wisin & Yandel – "Ahora Es" | 10 | **9** | 10 | 6 | 9 | 5 | 49 |
| 28 June | Magdalena & Jorge | Reggaeton | Héctor & Tito – "Baila Morena" | 7 | **7** | 6 | 4 | 7 | 3 | 34 |
| 28 June | Jennifer & Agustín | Reggaeton | Daddy Yankee – "¿Qué Tengo Que Hacer?" | 3 | **4** | 6 | 5 | 6 | 1 | 25 |
| 30 June | Ayelén P. & Emanuel | Reggaeton | Daddy Yankee – "Pose" | 4 | **7** | 10 | 6 | 7 | 5 | 39 |
| 30 June | Valeria & Reinaldo | Reggaeton | Don Omar – "Conteo" | 10 | **10** | 10 | 8 | 10 | 6 | 54 |
| 30 June | Cristian & Laura | Reggaeton | Zion & Lennox featuring Daddy Yankee – "Tu Príncipe" | 5 | **5** | 6 | 4 | 7 | 3 | 30 |
| 30 June | Mariano & Nadia | Reggaeton | Daddy Yankee – "King Daddy" | 7 | **7** | 7 | 5 | 5 | 3 | 34 |

=== July ===
Reggaeton, Bio-sphere and Argentine cumbia
| Date | Couple | Style | Song | Score | | | | | | Total |
| Date | Couple | Style | Song | Carmen | Flavio | Moria | Aníbal | Antonio | Marcelo | Total |
|---|---|---|---|---|---|---|---|---|---|---|
| 2 July | Paula & Peter | Reggaeton | Daddy Yankee – "Descontrol" | 8 | **8** | 8 | 7 | 9 | 4 | 44 |
| 2 July | Ayelén B. & Franco | Reggaeton | Don Omar – "Dile" | 8 | **7** | 6 | 5 | 8 | 3 | 37 |
| 2 July | Micaela & Juan P. | Reggaeton | Daddy Yankee – "Rompe" | 7 | **7** | 6 | 3 | 4 | 3 | 30 |
| 5 July | Noelia & Hernán | Reggaeton | Croni K – "Nadie lo Sabrá" | 10 | **9** | 8 | 6 | 10 | 5 | 48 |
| 5 July | Federico & Laura | Reggaeton | Daddy Yankee – "Dale Caliente" | 4 | **5** | 6 | 3 | 3 | 1 | 22 |
| 5 July | María & Marcos | Reggaeton | Wisin & Yandel – "Abusadora" | 10 | **8** | 9 | 6 | 10 | 4 | 47 |
| 5 July | Marcela F. & Facundo | Reggaeton | Don Omar – "Provocándome" | 10 | **9** | 9 | 5 | 9 | 3 | 45 |
| 6 July | Charlotte & Alejandro | Reggaeton | Yasuri Yamileth – "La Gilette" | 4 | **3** | 6 | 5 | 7 | 8 | 33 |
| 6 July | Marcela V. & Cristian | Reggaeton | Daddy Yankee – "Machucando" | 7 | **4** | 6 | 4 | 6 | 3 | 30 |
| 6 July | Grecia & Juan Leandro | Reggaeton | Wisin & Yandel – "Rakata" | 8 | **8** | 6 | 4 | 5 | 3 | 34 |
| 6 July | Andrea & Pier | Reggaeton | Daddy Yankee – "Llamado de Emergencia" | 10 | **5** | 8 | 4 | 10 | 8 | 45 |
| 7 July | Beto & Melina | Reggaeton | Tiburón Valdez – "Hasta Abajo Papi" | 5 | **6** | 5 | 4 | 5 | 4 | 29 |
| 7 July | Ana & Nicolás | Reggaeton | Flex featuring Mr. Saik – "Dime Si Te Vas Con Él" | 10 | **8** | 7 | 6 | 10 | 4 | 46 |
| 7 July | Matías & Soledad | Reggaeton | Daddy Yankee featuring Prince Royce – "Ven Conmigo" | 9 | **9** | 10 | 6 | 8 | 6 | 48 |
| 7 July | Verónica & Pablo | Reggaeton | Daddy Yankee – "Ella Me Levantó" | 9 | **7** | 10 | 6 | 10 | 8 | 50 |
| 7 July | Floppy & Christian | Reggaeton | Angel & Khriz – "Ven Bailalo" | 10 | **7** | 8 | 6 | 8 | 5 | 44 |
| 9 July | Florencia & Nicolás | Reggaeton | Ricky Martin featuring Daddy Yankee – "Drop It on Me" | 9 | **8** | 9 | 6 | 4 | 10 | 51 |
| 10 July | Florencia & Maximiliano | Bio-sphere | Soda Stereo – "Corazón Delator" | 9 | 8 | **8** | 5 | 9 | 5 | 44 |
| 10 July | Liz & Daniel | Bio-sphere | Adele – "Someone like You" | 9 | 7 | **7** | 5 | 8 | 5 | 41 |
| 12 July | Valeria & Reinaldo | Bio-sphere | Depeche Mode – "Enjoy the Silence" | 10 | 9 | **9** | 6 | 10 | 7 | 51 |
| 12 July | Magdalena & Jorge | Bio-sphere | Glee Cast – "True Colors" | 9^{[j1]} | 10 | **9** | 8 | 10 | 7 | 53 |
| 12 July | Ayelén B. & Franco | Bio-sphere | Nikka Costa – "On My Own" | 10 | 7 | **9** | 10 | 10 | 7 | 53 |
| 13 July | Ayelén P. & Emanuel | Bio-sphere | Fiona Apple – "Across the Universe" | 4 | 5 | **8** | 5 | 7 | 10 | 39 |
| 13 July | Federico & Yanil | Bio-sphere | Michael Jackson – "Earth Song" | 10 | 7 | **6** | 5 | 9 | 3 | 40 |
| 13 July | Grecia & Juan Leandro | Bio-sphere | Deftones – "No Ordinary Love" | 10 | 7 | **8** | 3 | 8 | 3 | 39 |
| 16 July | Paula & Peter | Bio-sphere | Katharine McPhee – "Beautiful" | 10 | 8 | **8** | 6 | 7 | 4 | 43 |
| 16 July | Andrea & Pier | Bio-sphere | Celine Dion – "All by Myself" | 7 | 7 | **7** | 4 | 9 | 10 | 44 |
| 16 July | María & Marcos | Bio-sphere | The Kennedy Choir – "Yesterday" / Luis Alberto Spinetta – "Muchacha Ojos de Papel" | 10 | 10 | **10** | 8 | 10 | 7 | 55 |
| 16 July | Verónica & Pablo | Bio-sphere | Boyce Avenue – "With or Without You" | 8 | 5 | **6** | 4 | 6 | 3 | 32 |
| 16 July | Charlotte & Alejandro | Bio-sphere | Lady Gaga – "Bad Romance" | 6 | 8 | **8** | 6 | 9 | 3 | 40 |
| 16 July | Beto & Melina | Bio-sphere | Metallica – "Nothing Else Matters" | 7 | 7 | **7** | 4 | 10 | 1 | 36 |
| 16 July | Marcela F. & Facundo | Bio-sphere | Moulin Rouge! – "El Tango de Roxanne" | 10 | 9 | **9** | 5 | 9 | 6 | 48 |
| 20 July | Noelia & Hernán | Bio-sphere | Queen – "Love of My Life" | 10 | 10 | **10** | 9 | 10 | 10 | 59 |
| 20 July | Alexander & Sofía | Bio-sphere | Led Zeppelin – "All My Love" | 10 | 8 | **8** | 6 | 9 | 6 | 47 |
| 20 July | Marcela V. & Cristian | Bio-sphere | Celine Dion – "Calling You" | 10 | 8 | **8** | 5 | 8 | 6 | 45 |
| 20 July | Mariano & Nadia | Bio-sphere | Celine Dion – "Alone" | 6 | 5 | **6** | 5 | 5 | 1 | 28 |
| 20 July | Matías & Soledad | Bio-sphere | Queen – "We Are the Champions" | 10 | 7 | **7** | 3 | 4 | 3 | 34 |
| 20 July | Micaela & Juan Pablo | Bio-sphere | Mick Jagger – "Hard Woman" | 9 | 7 | **9** | 6 | 6 | 6 | 43 |
| 23 July | Silvina & Christian | Bio-sphere | Orleya – "Baby, I Love Your Way" | 10 | 9 | **9** | 5 | 8 | 10 | 51 |
| 23 July | Cristian & Laura | Bio-sphere | Glee – "Hello" | 8 | 8 | **7** | 5 | 7 | 7 | 42 |
| 23 July | Ana & Nicolás | Bio-sphere | Avril Lavigne – "Imagine" | 10 | 10 | **9** | 7 | 10 | 7 | 53 |
| 24 July | Florencia & Nicolás | Argentine cumbia | Ráfaga – "Mentirosa" | 8 | 10 | 9 | 5 | **9**^{[j2]} | 7 | 48 |
| 24 July | Floppy & Cristian | Argentine cumbia | Amar Azul – "Porque Te Amo" | 6 | 6 | 6 | 3 | **9**^{[j2]} | 3 | 33 |
| 24 July | Andrea & Pier | Argentine cumbia | Damas Gratis – "Se Te Ve la Tanga" | 7 | 5 | 6 | 3 | **10** | 10 | 41 |
| 24 July | Micaela & Juan Pablo | Argentine cumbia | Los Palmeras – "Bombón Asesino" | 7 | 9 | 7 | 4 | **7** | 3 | 37 |
| 26 July | Paula & Peter | Argentine cumbia | Ráfaga – "Chiquilina" | 10 | 10 | 10 | 7 | **7** | 5 | 49 |
| 26 July | Matías & Soledad | Argentine cumbia | Los Charros – "Amores Como El Nuestro" | 10 | 9 | 8 | 5 | **8** | 7 | 47 |
| 26 July | Magdalena & Jorge | Argentine cumbia | Ráfaga – "Agüita" | 8 | 7 | 8 | 4 | **6** | 4 | 37 |
| 26 July | Liz & Daniel | Argentine cumbia | Lía Crucet – "La Güera Salomé" | 10 | 5 | 7 | 5 | **10** | 4 | 41 |
| 27 July | Valeria & Reinaldo | Argentine cumbia | Sombras – "Pega La Vuelta" | 8 | 8 | 9 | 4 | **9** | 4 | 42 |
| 27 July | Federico & Yanil | Argentine cumbia | Amar Azul – "Yo Me Enamoré" | 8 | 7 | 8 | 6 | **8** | 5 | 42 |
| 27 July | Marcela V. & Cristian | Argentine cumbia | La Nueva Luna – "Iluminará" | 8 | 7 | 8 | 4 | **7** | 4 | 38 |
| 27 July | Grecia & Juan Leandro | Argentine cumbia | Gilda – "Fuiste" | 6 | 6 | 9 | 3 | **6** | 3 | 33 |
| 27 July | Marcela F. & Facundo | Argentine cumbia | Ráfaga – "Luna Luna" | 5 | 6 | 7 | 3 | **9** | 3 | 33 |
| 30 July | Ayélen P. & Emanuel | Argentine cumbia | Gladys La Bomba Tucumana – "La Pollera Amarilla" | 7 | 9 | 7^{[j1]} | 6 | **8** | 3 | 40 |
| 30 July | Verónica & Pablo | Argentine cumbia | Gilda – "No Me Arrepiento de Este Amor" | 8 | 7 | 7 | 5 | **7** | 3 | 37 |
| 31 July | Beto & Melina | Argentine cumbia | Antonio Ríos – "Nunca Me Faltes" | 10 | 7 | 3 | 3 | **6**^{[j2]} | 1 | 30 |
| 31 July | Charlotte & Alejandro | Argentine cumbia | Karina – "Corazón Mentiroso" | 8 | 9 | 7 | 3 | **7**^{[j2]} | 7 | 41 |

=== August ===
Argentine cumbia, Strip dance, Cuarteto and Latin pop
| Date | Couple | Style | Song | Score | | | | | | Total |
| Date | Couple | Style | Song | Carmen | Flavio | Moria | Aníbal | Antonio | Marcelo | Total |
|---|---|---|---|---|---|---|---|---|---|---|
| 2 August | Noelia & Hernán | Argentine cumbia | Ráfaga – "Ritmo Caliente" | 10 | 10 | 10 | 8 | **10** | 10 | 58 |
| 2 August | Alexander & Sofía | Argentine cumbia | Los Wachiturros – "Tírate un Paso" | 10 | 10 | 10 | 6 | **9** | 5 | 50 |
| 2 August | Ayelén B. & Franco | Argentine cumbia | Cumbieton – "Cielo Sin Estrellas" | 10 | 9 | 8 | 6 | **10** | 5 | 48 |
| 3 August | María & Marcos | Argentine cumbia | Gilda – "Paisaje" | 10 | 10 | 10 | 7 | **10**^{[j2]} | 7 | 54 |
| 3 August | Cristian & Laura | Argentine cumbia | Volcán – "Esa Malvada" | 7 | 6 | 7 | 3 | **6**^{[j2]} | 1 | 30 |
| 3 August | Ana & Nicolás | Argentine cumbia | Lía Crucet – "Cumbia Apretadita" | 10 | 9 | 10 | 8 | **10** | 7 | 54 |
| 7 August | Florencia & Nicolás | Strip dance | Alicia Keys – "Fallin'" | 8 | 9 | 10 | **6** | 8 | 4 | 45 |
| 7 August | Andrea & Pier | Strip dance | Tom Jones – "You Can Leave Your Hat On" | 10 | 10 | 10 | **8** | 10 | 10 | 58 |
| 7 August | Marcela V. & Cristian | Strip dance | Aerosmith – "Crazy" | 9 | 8 | 9 | **5** | 7 | 4 | 42 |
| 9 August | Paula & Peter | Strip dance | Aerosmith – "Rag Doll" | 10 | 9 | 9 | **8** | 9 | 8 | 53 |
| 9 August | Floppy & Cristian | Strip dance | Prince – "Cream" | 10 | 10 | 6 | **5** | 7 | 3 | 41 |
| 9 August | Federico & Yanil | Strip dance | AC/DC – "You Shook Me All Night Long" | 9 | 7 | 8 | **6** | 7 | 2 | 39 |
| 9 August | Grecia & Juan Leandro | Strip dance | Jessica Rabbit – "Why Don't You Do Right?" | 4 | 7 | 6 | **3** | 5 | 1 | 26 |
| 9 August | Matías & Soledad | Strip dance | Prince – "Purple Rain" | 8 | 6 | 6 | **4** | 7 | 3 | 34 |
| 10 August | Adabel & Reinaldo | Strip dance | Guns N' Roses – "Live and Let Die" | 10 | 9 | 10 | **7** | 10^{[j2]} | 10 | 56 |
| 10 August | Alexander & Sofía | Strip dance | Bon Jovi – "It's My Life" | 5 | 7^{[j2]} | 9 | **6** | 8 | 3 | 38 |
| 10 August | Ayelén P. & Emanuel | Strip dance | Pussycat Dolls – "Buttons" | 6 | 8^{[j2]} | 7 | **4** | 6 | 10 | 41 |
| 10 August | María & Marcos | Strip dance | Lenny Kravitz – "American Woman" | 10 | 10^{[j2]} | 10 | **10** | 10 | 7 | 57 |
| 13 August | Noelia & Hernán | Strip dance | Joan Jett – "I Love Rock 'n' Roll" | 8 | 8 | 7 | **4** | 8^{[j1]} | 1 | 36 |
| 13 August | Charlotte & Alejandro | Strip dance | Beyoncé – "Naughty Girl" | 5 | 1 | 5 | **3** | 6^{[j1]} | 1 | 21 |
| 14 August | Magdalena & Jorge | Strip dance | Aerosmith – "Pink" | 8 | 7 | 7 | **4** | 7^{[j1]} | 3 | 36 |
| 14 August | Karina & Franco | Strip dance | Britney Spears – "(I Can't Get No) Satisfaction" | 5 | 6 | 9 | **9** | 10^{[j1]} | 10 | 49 |
| 16 August | Liz & Daniel | Strip dance | Christina Aguilera – "Express" | 10 | 10 | 10 | **10** | 10 | 8 | 58 |
| 16 August | Cristian & Laura | Strip dance | Guns N' Roses – "November Rain" | 10 | 10 | 10 | **5** | 10 | 8 | 53 |
| 16 August | Marcela F. & Facundo | Strip dance | B.B. King and Joe Cocker – "Dangerous Mood" | 4 | 10 | 8 | **5** | 9 | 2 | 38 |
| 17 August | Beto & Melina | Strip dance | Tom Jones – "Kiss" | 9 | 10 | 8 | **5** | 9^{[j2]} | 1 | 42 |
| 17 August | Ana & Nicolás | Strip dance | Gary Moore – "Still Got the Blues" | 5 | 6^{[j2]} | 9 | **8** | 10 | 3 | 41 |
| 17 August | Verónica & Pablo | Strip dance | Guns N' Roses – "Since I Don't Have You" | 10 | 8^{[j2]} | 10 | **6** | 10 | 7 | 51 |
| 20 August | Florencia & Nicolás | Cuarteto | La Mona Jiménez – "Beso A Beso" | **8** | 8 | 10 | 6 | 9 | 6 | 47 |
| 20 August | Valeria & Reinaldo | Cuarteto | La Barra – "Gotas de Pena" | **10** | 8 | 5 | 4 | 7 | 4 | 38 |
| 20 August | Andrea & Pier | Cuarteto | Walter Olmos – "Adicto a Ti" | **7** | 9 | 9 | 6 | 9 | 4 | 44 |
| 21 August | Verónica & Pablo | Cuarteto | Jean Carlos – "Pero Me Acuerdo de Ti" | **6** | 7 | 7 | 7 | 8 | 10 | 45 |
| 21 August | Alexander & Sofía | Cuarteto | Rodrigo – "La Mano de Dios" | **3** | 3 | 10 | 5 | 6 | 1 | 28 |
| 21 August | Beto & Melina | Cuarteto | Los Caligaris – "Nadie Es Perfecto" | **10** | 10 | 7 | 5 | 9 | 5 | 46 |
| 23 August | Paula & Peter | Cuarteto | Rodrigo – "Soy Cordobés" | **9** | 9 | 10 | 7 | 9 | 8 | 52 |
| 23 August | Ayelén P. & Emanuel | Cuarteto | Rodrigo – "¿Cómo le Digo a mi Mujer?" | **10** | 9 | 8 | 6 | 7 | 7 | 47 |
| 23 August | Marcela V. & Cristian | Cuarteto | La Mona Jiménez – "El Agite" | **7** | 5 | 6 | 4 | 7 | 3 | 32 |
| 23 August | Liz & Daniel | Cuarteto | Sabroso – "Mami Llegó Tu Papi" | **9** | 9 | 10 | 8 | 10 | 9 | 55 |
| 23 August | Ayelén B. & Franco | Cuarteto | La Mona Jiménez – "Boom Boom" | **6** | 6 | 4 | 3 | 9 | 4 | 32 |
| 24 August | Noelia & Hernán | Cuarteto | Rodrigo – "Que Ironía" | **10** | 10 | 10 | 8 | 10 | 8 | 56 |
| 24 August | Federico & Yanil | Cuarteto | Rodrigo – "Lo Mejor del Amor" | **8** | 8 | 7 | 6 | 10 | 3 | 42 |
| 24 August | Marcela F. & Facundo | Cuarteto | Rodrigo – "Ocho Cuarenta" | **8** | 8 | 9 | 5 | 8 | 5 | 43 |
| 24 August | María & Marcos | Cuarteto | Jean Carlos – "Quiéreme" | **10** | 10^{[j2]} | 10 | 9 | 10 | 10 | 59 |
| 24 August | Floppy & Cristian | Cuarteto | Walter Olmos – "No Me Mientas" | **10** | 9^{[j2]} | 10 | 5 | 7 | 3 | 44 |
| 27 August | Magdalena & Jorge | Cuarteto | Rodrigo – "Cómo Olvidarla" | **10** | 10 | 10 | 8 | 10 | 10 | 58 |
| 28 August | Charlotte & Alejandro | Cuarteto | Walter Olmos – "Por Lo Que Yo Te Quiero" | **8** | 8 | 9 | 5 | 5 | 3 | 38 |
| 28 August | Cristian & Laura | Cuarteto | Walter Olmos – "Amor Fugitivo" | **5** | 7 | 7 | 4 | 6 | 3 | 32 |
| 28 August | Matías & Soledad | Cuarteto | Rodrigo – "Fuego y Pasión" | **10** | 8 | 9 | 6 | 5 | 8 | 46 |
| 28 August | Ana & Nicolás | Cuarteto | La Konga – "Quiere Matar Al Ladron" | **6** | 7 | 9 | 6 | 8 | 5 | 41 |
| 30 August | Floppy & Cristian | Latin pop | Shakira – "Loca" | 5 | ? | 10 | 5 | 7 | 4 | 31 |
| 31 August | Magdalena & Jorge | Latin pop | David Bisbal – "Lloraré Las Penas" | 8 | ? | 4 | 5 | 9^{[j2]} | 4 | 30 |
| 31 August | Federico & Yanil | Latin pop | Ricky Martin – "Pégate" | 10 | ? | 7 | 5 | 8^{[j2]} | 2 | 32 |

=== September ===
Latin pop, Aquadance and Music video
| Date | Couple | Style | Song | Score | | | | | | Total |
| Date | Couple | Style | Song | Carmen | Flavio | Moria | Aníbal | Antonio | Marcelo | Total |
|---|---|---|---|---|---|---|---|---|---|---|
| 4 September | Florencia & Nicolás | Latin pop | Jennifer Lopez featuring Pitbull – "On the Floor" | 10 | **8** | 9 | 7 | 9^{[j2]} | 7 | 42 |
| 4 September | Alexander & Sofía | Latin pop | Don Omar featuring Lucenzo – "Danza Kuduro" | 10 | **8** | 10 | 6 | 9^{[j2]} | 5 | 40 |
| 4 September | Marcela F. & Facundo | Latin pop | Chayanne – "Ay Mamá" | 9 | **8** | 9 | 6 | 9^{[j2]} | 3 | 36 |
| 6 September | Verónica & Pablo | Latin pop | David Bisbal – "Ave María" | 10 | **8** | 8 | 5 | 9 | 5 | 45 |
| 6 September | Charlotte & Alejandro | Latin pop | Jennifer Lopez featuring Pitbull – "Dance Again" | – | – | – | – | – | – | – |
| 6 September | Cristian & Laura | Latin pop | David Bisbal – "Oye El Boom" | 3 | **4** | 5 | 2 | 6 | 1 | 21 |
| 6 September | Marcela V. & Cristian | Latin pop | Chayanne – "Baila Baila" | 8 | **6** | 7 | 5 | 7 | 3 | 36 |
| 7 September | Karina & Peter | Latin pop | Ricky Martin – "Más" | 10 | **8** | 10 | 6 | 9^{[j2]} | 8 | 51 |
| 7 September | Matías & Soledad | Latin pop | Chayanne – "Torero" | 10 | **10**^{[j1]} | 10 | 7 | 10^{[j2]} | 8 | 55 |
| 10 September | Noelia & Hernán | Latin pop | David Bisbal – "Bulería" | 10 | **10** | 10 | 6 | 10 | 8 | 54 |
| 10 September | Belén & Reinaldo | Latin pop | Chayanne – "Caprichosa" | 4 | **8** | 8 | 3 | 8 | 8 | 39 |
| 10 September | María & Marcos | Latin pop | Shakira – "Addicted to You" | 10 | **9** | 10 | 9 | 10 | 10 | 58 |
| 13 September | Andrea & Pier | Latin pop | Shakira – "Loba" | 4 | **7** | 6 | 7^{[j3]} | 4^{[j4]} | 3 | 31 |
| 13 September | Beto & Melina | Latin pop | Ricky Martin – "Livin' la Vida Loca" | 6 | **7** | 10 | 3^{[j3]} | 8^{[j4]} | 8 | 42 |
| 13 September | Ayelén P. & Emanuel | Latin pop | Chayanne – "Tu Boca" | 10 | **9** | 9 | 10^{[j3]} | 9^{[j4]} | 8 | 55 |
| 14 September | Liz & Daniel | Latin pop | Shakira featuring Pitbull – "Rabiosa" | **9**^{[j4]} | 10^{[j5]} | 10 | 10^{[j3]} | 10^{[j6]} | 9 | 58 |
| 14 September | Ana & Nicolás | Latin pop | Shakira – "Objection (Tango)" | **4**^{[j4]} | 6^{[j5]} | 4 | 6^{[j3]} | 8^{[j6]} | 3 | 31 |
| 17 September | Florencia & Nicolás | Aquadance | Evanescence – "My Immortal" | 10 | 10 | **10** | 10 | 10 | 10 | 60 |
| 17 September | Magdalena & Jorge | Aquadance | David Cook – "I Don't Want to Miss a Thing" | 8 | 9 | **8** | 8 | 9 | 4 | 46 |
| 17 September | María & Marcos | Aquadance | Robbie Williams – "Angels" | 9 | 10 | **9** | 10 | 10 | 9 | 57 |
| 18 September | Noelia & Hernán | Aquadance | Queen – "The Show Must Go On" | 10 | 10 | **10** | 10 | 10 | 10 | 60 |
| 18 September | Cinthia & Juan Leandro | Aquadance | Glee Cast – "Total Eclipse of the Heart" | 10 | 10 | **9** | 9 | 10 | 10 | 58 |
| 18 September | Ayelén P. & Emanuel | Aquadance | Sting – "Desert Rose" | 7 | 8 | **9** | 6 | 7 | 4 | 41 |
| 18 September | Beto & Melina | Aquadance | Bryan Adams – "(Everything I Do) I Do It for You" | 10 | 9 | **9** | 8 | 10 | 2 | 48 |
| 20 September | Verónica & Pablo | Aquadance | Keane – "Somewhere Only We Know" | 10 | 8 | **7**^{[j2]} | 8^{[j4]} | 8^{[j7]} | 4 | 45 |
| 20 September | Alexander & Sofía | Aquadance | Aerosmith – "Amazing" | 10 | 8 | **7** | 8^{[j4]} | 8^{[j7]} | 4 | 45 |
| 20 September | Matías & Soledad | Aquadance | Michael Bolton – "How Am I Supposed to Live Without You" | 6 | 8 | **6** | 9^{[j4]} | 7^{[j7]} | 5 | 41 |
| 21 September | Paula & Peter | Aquadance | Evanescence featuring Paul McCoy – "Bring Me to Life" | 10 | 10^{[j5]} | **9**^{[j1]} | 10^{[j4]} | 9^{[j7]} | 9 | 57 |
| 21 September | Federico & Yanil | Aquadance | System of a Down – "Lonely Day" | 10 | 9^{[j5]} | **8** | 9^{[j4]} | 8^{[j7]} | 4 | 48 |
| 21 September | Charlotte & Alejandro | Aquadance | Evanescence – "Call Me When You're Sober" | 7 | 8^{[j5]} | **8** | 7^{[j4]} | 9^{[j7]} | 8 | 47 |
| 24 September | Adabel & Reinaldo | Aquadance | Glee Cast – "Fix You" | 10 | 10 | **10** | 8 | 10 | 9 | 57 |
| 24 September | Andrea & Pier | Aquadance | Coldplay – "Clocks" | 6 | 6 | **7** | 4 | 6 | 3 | 32 |
| 24 September | Marcela F. & Facundo | Aquadance | Adele – "Turning Tables" | 6 | 8 | **4** | 4 | 7 | 3 | 32 |
| 24 September | Floppy & Cristian | Aquadance | Take That – "Rule the World" | 7 | 6 | **6** | 4 | 5 | 4 | 32 |
| 24 September | Cristian & Laura | Aquadance | Guns N' Roses – "Don't Cry" | 10 | 9 | **9** | 6 | 9 | 8 | 51 |
| 27 September | Magdalena & Jorge | Music video | Christina Aguilera – "Keeps Gettin' Better" | 9^{[j8]} | 8 | 9^{[j2]} | 9^{[j3]} | **6**^{[j4]} | 3 | 44 |
| 27 September | Alexander & Sofía | Music video | Chris Brown – "Turn Up the Music" | 8^{[j8]} | 8 | 10 | 10^{[j3]} | **7**^{[j4]} | 3 | 46 |
| 27 September | Federico & Yanil | Music video | Robbie Williams – "Let Me Entertain You" | 10^{[j8]} | 10 | 10 | 10^{[j3]} | **8**^{[j4]} | 8 | 56 |
| 27 September | Verónica & Pablo | Music video | Lady Gaga – "Bad Romance" | 10^{[j8]} | 9 | 5 | 7^{[j3]} | **10**^{[j4]} | 3 | 44 |
| 28 September | Paula & Peter | Music video | Jennifer Lopez featuring Pitbull – "Dance Again" | 8^{[j9]} | 7^{[j10]} | 10^{[j2]} | 10^{[j3]} | **8**^{[j4]} | 4 | 47 |
| 28 September | Andrea & Pier | Music video | Katy Perry – "I Kissed a Girl" | 8^{[j9]} | 10^{[j10]} | 9 | 6^{[j3]} | **6**^{[j4]} | 5 | 44 |
| 28 September | Cristian & Laura | Music video | The Black Eyed Peas – "I Gotta Feeling" | 7^{[j9]} | 8^{[j10]} | 7 | 8^{[j3]} | **6**^{[j4]} | 8 | 44 |

=== October ===
Music video, Arabic music, Electro dance and Pole dance
| Date | Couple | Style | Song | Score | | | | | | Total |
| Date | Couple | Style | Song | Carmen | Flavio | Moria | Aníbal | Antonio | Marcelo | Total |
|---|---|---|---|---|---|---|---|---|---|---|
| 1 October | Florencia & Nicolás | Music video | Christina Aguilera – "Not Myself Tonight" | 6 | 4 | 6 | 4 | **5** | 3 | 28 |
| 1 October | Liz & Daniel | Music video | Madonna – "Girl Gone Wild" | 7 | 5 | 6 | 8 | **10** | 8 | 44 |
| 1 October | Beto & Melina | Music video | Michael Jackson – "Thriller" | 1 | 4 | 9 | 4 | **9** | 1 | 28 |
| 1 October | Floppy & Cristian | Music video | Christina Aguilera, Lil' Kim, Mýa and Pink – "Lady Marmalade" | 6 | 5 | 7 | 5 | **6** | 4 | 33 |
| 1 October | Adabel & Reinaldo | Music video | Katy Perry – "Firework" | 10 | 8 | 8 | 5 | **8** | 6 | 45 |
| 2 October | Noelia & Hernán | Music video | Lady Gaga – "Judas" | 10 | 10 | 10 | 10 | **10** | 9 | 59 |
| 2 October | Charlotte & Alejandro | Music video | Madonna featuring Nicki Minaj and M.I.A. – "Give Me All Your Luvin'" | 10 | 8 | 8 | 7 | **9** | 8 | 50 |
| 2 October | Matías & Soledad | Music video | The Black Eyed Peas – "Pump It" | 10 | 9 | 10 | 8 | **9** | 8 | 54 |
| 2 October | María & Marcos | Music video | Britney Spears – "Till the World Ends" | 10 | 9 | 10 | 10 | **10** | 10 | 59 |
| 5 October | Magdalena & Jorge | Arabic music | Shakira – "Whenever, Wherever (Sahara Mix)" | **10** | 10^{[j10]} | 10^{[j2]} | 10^{[j3]} | 10^{[j4]} | 9 | 59 |
| 5 October | Alexander & Sofía | Arabic music | Ali Mohammed – "Raks Bedeya" | **5** | 6^{[j10]} | 4 | 10^{[j3]} | 6^{[j4]} | 2 | 33 |
| 5 October | Andrea & Pier | Arabic music | Ehab Tawfik – "Allah Aleik Ya Sidi" | **8** | 8^{[j10]} | 8 | 8^{[j3]} | 8^{[j4]} | 10 | 50 |
| 5 October | Federico & Yanil | Arabic music | Tarkan – "Ölürüm Sana" | **10** | 10^{[j10]} | 10 | 10^{[j3]} | 8^{[j4]} | 2 | 50 |
| 8 October | Florencia & Nicolás | Arabic music | Hakim – "Ehdarun" | **9** | 8 | 8 | 7 | 8 | 4 | 44 |
| 8 October | Paula & Peter | Arabic music | Tarkan – "Şımarık" | **9** | 9 | 10 | 8 | 9 | 8 | 53 |
| 8 October | Matías & Soledad | Arabic music | Hakim – "Wala Wahed" | **10** | 9 | 10 | 8 | 9 | 8 | 54 |
| 9 October | María & Marcos | Arabic music | Marcus Viana – "Maktub II" | **9** | 8 | 8 | 6 | 8 | 5 | 44 |
| 9 October | Charlotte & Alejandro | Arabic music | Shakira – "She Wolf (Said Mrad Remix)" | **6** | 4 | 4 | 5 | 5 | 1 | 25 |
| 11 October | Karina & Maximiliano | Arabic music | Shakira – "Ojos Así" | **10** | 10 | 10^{[j2]} | 6 | 10^{[j3]} | 5 | 51 |
| 11 October | Cristian & Laura | Arabic music | Hakim – "Ah Ya Albi" | **9** | 9 | 10 | 5 | 9^{[j3]} | 2 | 44 |
| 15 October | Noelia & Hernán | Arabic music | Mohammad Fouad – "Yalla Hawa" | **10** | 10 | 10 | 9 | 9^{[j4]} | 7 | 55 |
| 18 October | Tito & Melina | Arabic music | Saad – "Bellydance" | **9**^{[j4]} | 9 | 8^{[j2]} | 5^{[j10]} | 10^{[j3]} | 3 | 44 |
| 18 October | Verónica & Pablo | Arabic music | Amir Sofi – "Isis" | **8**^{[j4]} | 8 | 10 | 9^{[j10]} | 9^{[j3]} | 8 | 52 |
| 18 October | Adabel & Reinaldo | Arabic music | Diaa – "El Leilah" | **10**^{[j4]} | 10 | 9 | 10^{[j10]} | 10^{[j3]} | 9 | 58 |
| 23 October | Florencia & Nicolás | Electro dance | Rihanna featuring Calvin Harris – "We Found Love" | 10 | **8** | 8 | 7 | – | 8 | 33 |
| 23 October | Noelia & Hernán | Electro dance | Lady Gaga – "Born This Way" | 10 | **8** | 8 | 7 | – | 5 | 30 |
| 23 October | Adabel & Reinaldo | Electro dance | Martin Solveig featuring Dragonette – "Hello" | 4 | **6** | 4 | 2 | – | 1 | 11 |
| 23 October | Federico & Yanil | Electro dance | LMFAO featuring Lauren Bennett and GoonRock – "Party Rock Anthem" | 9 | **8** | 10 | 8 | – | 7 | 34 |
| 23 October | Matías & Soledad | Electro dance | David Guetta featuring Taio Cruz and Ludacris – "Little Bad Girl" | 8 | **5** | 7 | 5 | – | 5 | 25 |
| 25 October | Magdalena & Jorge | Electro dance | David Guetta featuring Flo Rida and Nicki Minaj – "Where Them Girls At" | 9 | **9** | 10 | 7 | – | 7 | 33 |
| 25 October | Alexander & Sofía | Electro dance | LMFAO – "Sexy and I Know It" | 10 | **10** | 10 | 10 | – | 10 | 40 |
| 26 October | Cristian & Laura | Electro dance | David Guetta featuring Kelly Rowland – "When Love Takes Over" | 8 | **8**^{[j4]} | 8^{[j1]} | 4 | – | 2 | 22 |
| 26 October | Paula & Peter | Electro dance | Psy – "Gangnam Style" | 10 | **9**^{[j4]} | 9^{[j1]} | 10 | – | 8 | 37 |
| 26 October | Andrea & Cristian | Electro dance | David Guetta featuring Rihanna – "Who's That Chick?" | 10 | **9**^{[j4]} | 9^{[j1]} | 7 | – | 7 | 33 |
| 26 October | María & Marcos | Electro dance | Flo Rida featuring David Guetta – "Club Can't Handle Me" | 6 | **9**^{[j4]} | 7 | 5 | – | 4 | 22 |
| 26 October | Verónica & Pablo | Electro dance | David Guetta featuring Akon – "Sexy Bitch" | 6 | **5**^{[j4]} | 8 | 5 | – | 3 | 22 |
| 26 October | Beto & Melina | Electro dance | The Black Eyed Peas – "The Time (Dirty Bit)" | 7 | **6**^{[j4]} | 6 | 4 | – | 4 | 21 |
| 29 October | Alexandra & Maximiliano | Electro dance | Rihanna – "S&M" | 8 | **10** | 6 | 6 | – | 9 | 39 |
| 30 October | Florencia & Nicolás | Pole dance | Kris Allen – "Come together" | 10 | 7 | **9** | 8 | – | 8 | 42 |
| 30 October | Magdalena & Jorge | Pole dance | Lady Gaga – "Yoü and I" | 10 | 10 | **7** | 6 | – | 4 | 37 |
| 30 October | Noelia & Hernán | Pole dance | Guns N' Roses – "Welcome to the Jungle" | 10 | 10 | **10** | 9 | – | 8 | 47 |

=== November ===
Pole dance, Freestyle, Adagio from Telenovelas, Merengue and Rock and roll
| Date | Couple | Style | Song | Score | | | | | Total |
| Date | Couple | Style | Song | Carmen | Flavio | Moria | Aníbal | Marcelo | Total |
|---|---|---|---|---|---|---|---|---|---|
| 1 November | Andrea & Cristian | Pole dance | Lenny Kravitz – "Always on the Run" | 6 | 7 | **8**^{[j2]} | 6 | 10 | 37 |
| 1 November | Alexander & Sofía | Pole dance | INXS – "New Sensation" | 8 | 5 | **10** | 6 | 4 | 33 |
| 1 November | Beto & Melina | Pole dance | AC/DC – "Highway to Hell" | 7 | 10 | **5** | 3 | 3 | 28 |
| 2 November | Paula & Peter | Pole dance | Alannah Myles – "Black Velvet" | 9 | 10^{[j3]} | **8** | 7 | 7 | 41 |
| 2 November | Cristian & Laura | Pole dance | Aerosmith – "Eat the Rich" | 10 | 6^{[j3]} | **10** | 10 | 8 | 44 |
| 2 November | Federico & Yanil | Pole dance | Will Smith – "Black Suits Comin' (Nod Ya Head)" | 10 | 10^{[j3]} | **10** | 10 | 7 | 47 |
| 2 November | María & Marcos | Pole dance | Christina Aguilera – "Fighter" | 8 | 9^{[j3]} | **8** | 7 | 5 | 37 |
| 5 November | Matías & Soledad | Pole dance | U2 – "Elevation" | 10 | 10^{[j3]} | **7** | 6 | 7 | 37 |
| 5 November | Verónica & Pablo | Pole dance | Billy Idol – "Mony Mony" | 10 | 9^{[j3]} | **10** | 8 | 4 | 41 |
| 6 November | Alexandra & Maximiliano | Pole dance | Poison – "Unskinny Bop" | 10 | 10^{[j3]} | **8** | 7 | 7 | 42 |
| 8 November | Paula & Peter | Freestyle | Guns N' Roses – "Live and Let Die" | 10 | 10^{[j3]} | 5 | **5** | 3 | 33 |
| 8 November | Alexander & Sofía | Freestyle | Justin Bieber featuring Nicki Minaj – "Beauty and a Beat" | 4 | 7^{[j3]} | 6 | **3** | 1 | 21 |
| 8 November | Magdalena & Jorge | Freestyle | Donna Summer – "I Feel Love" | 10 | 10^{[j3]} | 10 | **7** | 5 | 42 |
| 8 November | Cristian & Laura | Freestyle | Jennifer Lopez featuring Flo Rida – "Goin' In" | 10 | 10^{[j3]} | 10 | **8** | 4 | 42 |
| 8 November | Matías & Soledad | Freestyle | Ludwig van Beethoven – "Symphony No. 5 (Remix)" | 10 | 10^{[j3]} | 10 | **10** | 8 | 48 |
| 9 November | Florencia & Nicolás | Freestyle | Mary Poppins – "Supercalifragilisticexpialidocious" | 10 | 10^{[j3]} | 7 | **10** | 6 | 43 |
| 9 November | Noelia & Hernán | Freestyle | Nitin Sawhney – "Homelands" | 8 | 10^{[j3]} | 10 | **10** | 8 | 46 |
| 9 November | Andrea & Cristian | Freestyle | Rihanna – "Take a Bow" | 10 | 10^{[j3]} | 10 | **10** | 8 | 48 |
| 9 November | Federico & Yanil | Freestyle | Nirvana – "Smells Like Teen Spirit" | 8 | 10^{[j3]} | 10 | **10** | 7 | 45 |
| 9 November | Verónica & Pablo | Freestyle | Björk – "It's Oh So Quiet" | 10 | 10^{[j3]} | 10 | **8** | 7 | 45 |
| 12 November | Karina & Marcos | Freestyle | Michael Bublé – "All of Me / Fever" | 6 | 8 | 5 | '3 | 3 | 25 |
| 12 November | Alexandra & Maximiliano | Freestyle | Marilyn Monroe – "Gentlemen Prefer Blondes" | 9 | 9 | 8 | **8** | 8 | 42 |
| 13 November | Noelia & Hernán | Adagio from telenovelas | Jesse & Joy – "¡Corre!" (from Dulce amor) | **10** | 9 | 6 | 5 | 4 | 34 |
| 13 November | Florencia & Nicolás | Adagio from telenovelas | Ricardo Montaner – "Bésame la Boca" (from Al diablo con los guapos) | **10** | 9 | 10 | 10 | 8 | 47 |
| 13 November | Magdalena & Jorge | Adagio from telenovelas | Franco De Vita featuring Alejandra Guzmán – "Tan Sólo Tú" (from Los únicos) | **10** | 10 | 10 | 10 | 10 | 50 |
| 13 November | Federico & Yanil | Adagio from telenovelas | David Bisbal – "Herederos" (from Herederos de una venganza) | **10** | 8 | 9 | 7 | 4 | 38 |
| 15 November | Paula & Peter | Adagio from telenovelas | Ricardo Montaner – "Tan Enamorados" (from Niña Bonita) | **8** | 8 | 7 | 4 | 2 | 30 |
| 15 November | Alexander & Sofía | Adagio from telenovelas | Cristian Castro – "Dame la Llave de tu Corazón" (from Lobo) | **6** | 7 | 7 | 4 | 10 | 34 |
| 15 November | Cristian & Laura | Adagio from telenovelas | Ricardo Montaner – "Volver" (from Valientes) | **10** | 9 | 8 | 6 | 4 | 37 |
| 15 November | Matías & Soledad | Adagio from telenovelas | Marc Anthony – "¿Y Cómo Es Él?" (from Lobo) | **10** | 9 | 8 | 7 | 6 | 40 |
| 16 November | Verónica & Pablo | Adagio from telenovelas | Alejandro Fernández – "Miénteme" (from Sos Mi Hombre) | **10** | 10^{[j3]} | 9^{[j4]} | 7 | 5 | 41 |
| 16 November | Alexandra & Maximiliano | Adagio from telenovelas | Ricardo Montaner – "El Poder de Tu Amor" (from Calypso) | **6** | 7^{[j3]} | 8^{[j4]} | 8 | 10 | 39 |
| 19 November | Andrea & Cristian | Adagio from telenovelas | Ricardo Montaner – "Castillo Azul" (from Sangre Azul) | **6** | 8 | 9 | 7 | 4 | 34 |
| 20 November | Noelia & Hernán | Merengue | Olga Tañón – "Es Mentiroso | 10 | **10** | 10 | 10 | 10 | 50 |
| 20 November | Florencia & Nicolás | Merengue | Juan Luis Guerra – "A Pedir Su Mano" | 9 | **8** | 8 | 9 | 9 | 43 |
| 20 November | Magdalena & Jorge | Merengue | Banda XXI – "Chica Sexy" | 5 | **7** | 7 | 7 | 7 | 33 |
| 20 November | Matías & Soledad | Merengue | Banda XXI – "Yo No Te Pido La Luna" | 10 | **9** | 8 | 6 | 6 | 39 |
| 22 November | Paula & Peter | Merengue | Wilfrido Vargas – "Abusadora" | 10 | 8 | **7** | 9 | 5 | 39 |
| 22 November | Alexander & Sofía | Merengue | Banda XXI – "Cuando Me Enamoro" | 6 | **6** | 7 | 5 | 8 | 32 |
| 22 November | Verónica & Pablo | Merengue | La Konga – "Mi Niña Bonita" | 7 | **6** | 5 | 6 | 9 | 33 |
| 23 November | Andrea & Cristian | Merengue | Banda XXI – "Esa Chica Tiene Swing" | 6 | **9**^{[j3]} | 5^{[j4]} | 4 | 8 | 32 |
| 23 November | Alexandra & Maximiliano | Merengue | RKM & Ken-Y – "Te Regalo Amores" | 7 | **8**^{[j3]} | 7^{[j4]} | 8 | 10 | 40 |
| 23 November | Federico & Yanil | Merengue | Banda XXI – "Tu Cintura" | 10 | **10**^{[j3]} | 9^{[j4]} | 8 | 8 | 45 |
| 27 November | Noelia & Hernán | Rock and roll | Kenny Loggins – "Footloose" | 10 | 10 | **9** | 8 | 8 | 45 |
| 27 November | Florencia & Nicolás | Rock and roll | Elvis Presley – "Jailhouse Rock | 8 | 7 | **7** | 7 | 10 | 39 |
| 27 November | Alexander & Sofía | Rock and roll | Little Richard – "Tutti Frutti" | 6 | 8 | **8** | 7 | 5 | 34 |
| 27 November | Magdalena & Jorge | Rock and roll | Glee – "Proud Mary" | 7 | 8 | **9** | 7 | 10 | 41 |
| 27 November | Federico & Yanil | Rock and roll | Creedence Clearwater Revival – "Travelin' Band" | 10 | 10 | **9** | 8 | 4 | 41 |
| 29 November | Paula & Peter | Rock and roll | Elvis Presley – "Hound Dog" | **9**^{[j4]} | 8 | 10^{[j3]} | 6 | 10 | 43 |
| 29 November | Alexandra & Maximiliano | Rock and roll | Elvis Presley – "Blue Suede Shoes" | **8**^{[j4]} | 7 | 6^{[j3]} | 8 | 10 | 39 |
| 29 November | Matías & Soledad | Rock and roll | Jerry Lee Lewis – "Great Balls of Fire" | **10**^{[j4]} | 8 | 10^{[j3]} | 8 | 8 | 44 |
| 30 November | Andrea & Cristian | Rock and roll | Queen – "Crazy Little Thing Called Love" | **7**^{[j4]} | 10^{[j3]} | 8^{[j1]} | 8 | 8 | 41 |

=== December ===
Rotating room, Ballet, Salsa and Tango
| Date | Couple | Style | Song | Score | | | | | Total |
| Date | Couple | Style | Song | Carmen | Flavio | Moria | Aníbal | Marcelo | Total |
|---|---|---|---|---|---|---|---|---|---|
| 3 December | Florencia & Nicolás | Rotating room | Jamiroquai – "Canned Heat" | 9 | 7 | 10 | **8** | 8 | 42 |
| 3 December | Andrea & Cristian | Rotating room | The Beatles – "Help!" | 8 | 7 | 7 | **6** | 6 | 34 |
| 3 December | Magdalena & Jorge | Rotating room | Justin Bieber featuring Ludacris – "Baby" | 10 | 9 | 8 | **10** | 9 | 46 |
| 4 December | Paula & Peter | Rotating room | – | – | – | – | – | – | – |
| 4 December | Noelia & Hernán | Rotating room | Queen – "Don't Stop Me Now" | 10 | 8 | 9 | 8 | **6** | 41 |
| 4 December | Alexandra & Maximiliano | Rotating room | Poncho featuring Maxi Trusso – "Please Me" | 7 | 7 | 10 | **8** | 8 | 40 |
| 6 December | Federico & Yanil | Rotating room | Scissor Sisters – "Any Which Way" | 8^{[j4]} | 7 | 10^{[j3]} | **7** | 6 | 38 |
| 6 December | Matías & Soledad | Rotating room | Adele – "Rolling in the Deep (Remix)" | 9^{[j4]} | 7 | 8^{[j3]} | **8** | 6 | 38 |
| 7 December | Noelia & Hernán | Ballet | Giuseppe Verdi – "Il corsaro" | 9^{[j7]} | **10**^{[j2]} | 10^{[j3]} | 10 | 10 | 49 |
| 7 December | Magdalena & Jorge | Ballet | Pyotr Ilyich Tchaikovsky – "Swan Lake" | 10^{[j7]} | **10**^{[j2]} | 9^{[j3]} | 10 | 10 | 49 |
| 7 December | Matías & Soledad | Ballet | Antonio Vivaldi – "The Four Seasons" | 8^{[j7]} | **9**^{[j2]} | 9^{[j3]} | 8 | 8 | 42 |
| 7 December | Federico & Yanil | Ballet | Andrew Lloyd Webber – "The Phantom of the Opera" | 8^{[j7]} | **9**^{[j2]} | 10^{[j3]} | 7 | 7 | 41 |
| 7 December | Andrea & Cristian | Ballet | Georges Bizet – "Carmen" | 6^{[j7]} | **7**^{[j2]} | 9^{[j3]} | 7 | 9 | 38 |
| 10 December | Peter & Vanesa | Ballet | Pyotr Ilyich Tchaikovsky – "Piano Concerto No. 1" | – | – | – | – | – | – |
| 10 December | Lolo & Nicolás | Ballet | Pyotr Ilyich Tchaikovsky – "The Nutcracker" | 10 | **10** | 10 | 10 | 10 | 50 |
| 11 December | Noelia & Hernán | Salsa | Orquesta La 33 – "La Rumba Buena" | 10 | ? | 10 | 10 | 10 | 40 |
| 11 December | Magdalena & Jorge | Salsa | Eddie Palmieri – "La Malanga" | 9 | 9 | 10 | 10 | 10 | 48 |
| 11 December | Federico & Yanil | Salsa | Frankie Negrón – "No Me Compares" | 10 | 10 | 9 | 10 | 8 | 47 |
| 13 December | Florencia & Nicolás | Salsa | Dark Latin Groove – "Magdalena, Mi Amor (Quimbara)" | – | – | – | – | – | – |
| 13 December | Matías & Soledad | Salsa | Sonora Carruseles – "La Salsa Llegó" | 8^{[j4]} | **10** | 10^{[j3]} | 10 | 8 | 46 |
| 13 December | Vanesa & Peter | Salsa | Dark Latin Groove – "Juliana" | 7^{[j4]} | **9** | 10^{[j3]} | 7 | 7 | 40 |

==== Duel ====
Duel
| Date | Couple | Style | Song |
|---|---|---|---|
| 14 December | Noelia & Hernán | Tango | Juan D'Arienzo – "La Puñalada" |
| 14 December | Matías & Soledad | Tango | Gerardo Matos Rodríguez – "La Cumparsita" |
| 14 December | Magdalena & Jorge | Tango | Mariano Mores – "Tanguera" |
| 14 December | Florencia & Nicolás | Tango | Mariano Mores – "El Firulete" |
| 14 December | Vanesa & Peter | Tango | Mariano Mores – "Taquito Militar" |

==== Semifinal and Final ====
Semifinal and Final
| Date | Couple | Style | Song | Points | | | | | |
| Date | Couple | Style | Song | Carmen | Flavio | Moria | Anibal | Marcelo | Result |
|---|---|---|---|---|---|---|---|---|---|
| 1st Semifinal (19 December) | Florencia & Nicolás | Reggaeton | Ricky Martin featuring Daddy Yankee – "Drop It on Me" | – | – | – | 1 | – | – |
| 1st Semifinal (19 December) | Noelia & Hernán | Reggaeton | Croni K – "Nadie lo Sabrá" | 1 | 1 | 1 | – | 1 | **1** |
| 1st Semifinal (19 December) | Florencia & Nicolás | Freestyle | Mary Poppins – "Supercalifragilisticexpialidocious" | 1 | 1 | – | 1 | 1 | **1** |
| 1st Semifinal (19 December) | Noelia & Hernán | Freestyle | Nitin Sawhney – "Homelands" | – | – | 1 | – | – | – |
| 1st Semifinal (19 December) | Florencia & Nicolás | Cuarteto | La Mona Jiménez – "Beso A Beso" | – | – | 1 | – | – | – |
| 1st Semifinal (19 December) | Noelia & Hernán | Cuarteto | Rodrigo – "Que Ironía" | 1 | 1 | – | 1 | 1 | **1** |
| 1st Semifinal (19 December) | Florencia & Nicolás | Latin pop | Jennifer Lopez featuring Pitbull – "On the Floor" | – | – | – | – | – | – |
| 1st Semifinal (19 December) | Noelia & Hernán | Latin pop | David Bisbal – "Bulería" | 1 | 1 | 1 | 1 | 1 | **1** |
| 2nd Semifinal (20 December) | Vanesa & Peter | Disco | Cher – "Strong Enough" | 1 | – | – | – | – | – |
| 2nd Semifinal (20 December) | Magdalena & Jorge | Disco | Patrick Hernandez – "Born to be Alive" | – | 1 | 1 | 1 | 1 | **1** |
| 2nd Semifinal (20 December) | Vanesa & Peter | Rock and roll | Elvis Presley – "Hound Dog" | – | 1 | 1 | – | 1 | **1** |
| 2nd Semifinal (20 December) | Magdalena & Jorge | Rock and roll | Glee – "Proud Mary" | 1 | – | – | 1 | – | – |
| 2nd Semifinal (20 December) | Vanesa & Peter | Electro dance | Psy – "Gangnam Style" | – | – | 1 | – | – | – |
| 2nd Semifinal (20 December) | Magdalena & Jorge | Electro dance | David Guetta featuring Flo Rida and Nicki Minaj – "Where Them Girls At" | 1 | 1 | – | 1 | 1 | **1** |
| 2nd Semifinal (20 December) | Vanesa & Peter | Latin pop | Ricky Martin – "Más" | – | – | – | – | – | – |
| 2nd Semifinal (20 December) | Magdalena & Jorge | Latin pop | David Bisbal – "Lloraré Las Penas" | 1 | 1 | 1 | 1 | 1 | **1** |
| Final (22 December) | Noelia & Hernán | Argentine cumbia | Ráfaga – "Ritmo Caliente" | 1 | 1 | 1 | 1 | - | **1** |
| Final (22 December) | Magdalena & Jorge | Argentine cumbia | Ráfaga – "Agüita" | - | - | - | - | 1 | - |
| Final (22 December) | Noelia & Hernán | Adagio from telenovelas | Jesse & Joy – "¡Corre!" (from Dulce amor) | - | - | - | - | - | - |
| Final (22 December) | Magdalena & Jorge | Adagio from telenovelas | Franco De Vita featuring Alejandra Guzmán – "Tan Sólo Tú" (from Los únicos) | 1 | 1 | 1 | 1 | 1 | **1** |
| Final (22 December) | Noelia & Hernán | Merengue | Olga Tañón – "Es Mentiroso | 1 | 1 | 1 | 1 | 1 | **1** |
| Final (22 December) | Magdalena & Jorge | Merengue | Banda XXI – "Chica Sexy" | - | - | - | - | - | - |
| Final (22 December) | Noelia & Hernán | Music videos | Lady Gaga – "Judas" | 1 | 1 | 1 | - | 1 | **1** |
| Final (22 December) | Magdalena & Jorge | Music videos | Christina Aguilera – "Keeps Gettin' Better" | - | - | - | 1 | - | - |

- **^[j1]** replaced by Lolo Rossi.
- **^[j2]** replaced by Hugo Ávila.
- **^[j3]** replaced by Ricardo Fort.
- **^[j4]** replaced by Silvina Escudero.
- **^[j5]** replaced by Chiche Gelblung.
- **^[j6]** replaced by Santiago Bal.
- **^[j7]** replaced by Reina Reech.
- **^[j8]** replaced by Eleonora Cassano.
- **^[j9]** replaced by Laura Fidalgo.
- **^[j10]** replaced by Jean François Casanovas.
