= David Solari =

David Solari may refer to:

- David Solari (cyclist) (born 1968), former cyclist
- David Solari (footballer) (born 1986), Argentine football player
