= The Last Man (2019 film) =

- DVD release cover
- Directed by: Rodrigo H. Vila
- Written by: Rodrigo H. Vila; Gustavo Lencina
- Produced by: Gonzalo Vila; Rodrigo H. Vila
- Starring: Hayden Christensen; Harvey Keitel
- Cinematography: Daniel Ortega
- Edited by: Luis de la Madrid; Jordi López
- Music by: Emilio Kauderer
- Production companies: Cinema 7 Films; Aicon Music Pictures Quintessential Film; Non Stop; 3Dar; Grindstone Entertainment Group
- Distributed by: Lionsgate Home Entertainment
- Release date: January 1, 2019
- Running time: 100 minutes
- Countries: Argentina; Canada; United Kingdom
- Language: English

The Last Man, also known as El último hombre, is a 2019 Argentine-Canadian science fiction film co-written and directed by Rodrigo H. Vila and starring Hayden Christensen, Harvey Keitel, Marco Leonardi, Liz Solari, and Rafael Spregelburd.

The story, set in a post-apocalyptic future, revolves around Kurt (Christensen) a veteran suffering from PTSD, who meets a local street prophet (Keitel) who predicts that a catastrophic storm will strike soon. Kurt starts preparing for an impending disaster while meeting Jessica (Solari), a woman who also believes in the upcoming predictions.

== Plot ==
Kurt, a young war veteran, wakes up from a nightmare where he watches a wounded soldier in a trench, who is begging Kurt to kill him. He wakes up underneath his bed while clutching a weapon, a sleeping habit he acquired as a result of suffering from PTSD. Kurt lives in an unnamed postapocalyptic city perpertually plagued by stormy weather and regularly goes to a black market where all the survivors of environmental disasters and the current global economic fallout are shopping and selling goods. It took only 30 days for the world to fall to this state in a past event that is now called "The Black Month".

Kurt purchases two bottles of liquor and two canaries from a woman at a shop. A gang of neonazis break in to rob the woman at gun point and a Nazi named Steve tries to intimidate Kurt, to no effect. Later, Kurt watches the local street prophet, Noe, describe the end of times. Noe is interrupted and Kurt leaves after the leader of the Nazi group does the salute to Kurt. The next day Kurt tests a gas mask in his home killing the two birds he purchased earlier. The mask fails so he takes it back to the shop, who is run by Noe’s believers. Noe gives Kurt a refund, as well as a book Noe wrote on survival. As Kurt leaves Steve and the leader of the Nazis show up and demand money from Noe, stealing from the register and holding them at gun point. Outside the Nazis beat up Kurt until Noe begs them to stop. They leave a bloody Kurt and tell Noe they will be back for the rest of the money.

Kurt wakes up in his apartment from the same nightmare as before. He watches the news as it tells about all the ecological disasters. Kurt watches as Noe claims on the TV that and apocalyptic electrical storm is coming. Kurt looks for a job at a security office to help him get supplies. A child outside the workplace asks Kurt if he is dead and a ghost, explaining that he knows Kurt is a soldier and that Kurt's deceased friend Johnny said Kurt is a ghost just like him. Meanwhile Jessica is working at the security office and turns down a coworker's offer for a date before taking Kurt to an interview with her father. Jessica’s father gives Kurt the job in his security company, stating that he likes Kurt’s past as a combat veteran, and that Kurt can work there as long as he brings him "solutions".

Kurt wakes from the same nightmare as before, but this time in the nightmare he agrees to the soldier’s pleas and shoots him in the trench. Hearing someone at the kitchen, Kurt is startled by a vision of his former friend Johnny. Kurt talks to Johnny for a while, claiming that there is no way for the latter to be alive as Kurt shot him, revealing that Johnny is the soldier in Kurt's dream. Kurt asks if Johnny had been talking to a kid about him, and Johnny leaves. While at work Kurt finds a door in the basement that is not on the blueprints. He informs his boss about it, who only orders Kurt to "leave it alone" and forget about the door.

While leaving food for a homeless man Kurt is confronted by a local man who demands him to stop walking. Kurt ignores the man and suddenly sees the child outside his workplace again. He runs to try and find him, but is unsuccessful. While at work the power goes out. Kurt and Jessica grow closer as they discuss her tattoo of a circle. Gomez, the man who does Jessica’s father’s "dirty work", threatens Kurt and tells him to stay away from Jessica. Soon after Kurt crosses paths with the Nazi Steve again. This time Kurt fights back, taking Steve’s gun, breaking his arm, and scaring his companion. Kurt meets with Noe again. Kurt tells Noe he needs to take care of his Nazi problem. Noe dismisses the problem saying they are just attention seeking. Noe suggests Kurt come with his group as they are leaving in three days and that he should find a woman as well. Jessica arrives and watches Noe preach with Kurt.

Kurt is preparing for the apocalypse by creating a shelter and gathering supplies. The neighbor threatens Kurt again about the homeless man with a crowbar this time. Kurt takes it from the man and gives it to the homeless man telling him to keep the neighbor off his property. Kurt continues to work on his bunker, Johnny shows up in the house and questions him on why he is doing this. Jessica shows up and tells him money has gone missing at work and Gomez is accusing Kurt. Kurt tells her he didn’t take the money. They have sex. After Kurt asks if he scares her and she says he’s special as he did sell everything and turn his home into a bunker. He then proceeds to show her his actual bunker. Jessica tells them there isn’t enough water for two and states her interest in joining him. Jessica leaves and arrives Gomez having followed Jessica to Kurt’s house and threatens him and Jessica. Neo’s group prepares to leave for the mountains. The Nazis arrive and demands more money in exchange for only killing all Neo’s followers and not torturing them. Kurt arrives and kills several of the Nazis, busy sparing one who didn’t escape, allowing Neo’s group to leave.

Using Jessica as bait Gomez gets Kurt to open the door. The knock Kurt out and imprison him in an insane asylum. A man interviews Kurt. He tells Kurt that Noe’s real name is Allen Green and he was convicted twice for fraud. He also tells him that the police found Kurt’s shelter (but not the bunker) and that there is no indication of the world coming to an end. Gomez and Jessica’s father are watching the interview. Jessica’s father wants Kurt alive until he gets his money back. Noe meets Kurt pretending to be his lawyer and having shaved his beard. After Kurt killed the Nazis the police confiscated all the supplies of Noe’s group and he had to go into hiding. Noe reveals that the Nazis collected money for Jessica’s father. Noe swears that more storms are coming and begs Kurt not to give up as Kurt saved Noe and all his followers. Noe promises Kurt he will get him out. The Nazis that escaped from before arrive at his cell to hurt him. Before they can hurt him too much another patient beats the two Nazis and tells Kurt his lawyer arranged his escape. The Nazi that Kurt spared assists in his escape.

Kurt returns to his house and his undisturbed bunker. He leaves against Johnny insistence that he stays to find Jessica. Before walking into the security office to find Jessica Kurt sees the boy again. The boy repeats Kurt’s father’s final words and it is revealed that the boy is a young Kurt. Kurt walks into the security office with a gun and demands to know where Jessica is. Gomez comes in with a gun behind Kurt though he’s supposed to be protecting Jessica. Kurt plays the recording he took of Gomez threatening Jessica for her father. Her father realizes it was Gomez who took the money and pulls a gun on him. Gomez shoots Kurt twice then shoots Jessica’s father. Kurt who had been wearing a protective vest shoots and kills Gomez. Jessica’s father begs Kurt to find his daughter with his dying breath.

The storms have started again and are worse than before. Kurt fights through the storm back to his bunker and discovers Jessica is already there waiting for him. Kurt comforts her as she cries.

== Cast ==
- Hayden Christensen as Kurt
- Harvey Keitel as Noe
- Marco Leonardi as Antonio
- Liz Solari as Jessica
- Justin Kelly as Johnny
- Rafael Spregelburd as Gomez

== Release ==
The film was released in theaters and on video-on-demand on January 18, 2019. The film grossed an estimated $12,047 at the box office.

== Reception ==
The film received generally negative reviews from critics, with criticism focusing on the film's plot and on Christensen's performance as Kurt. Christy Lemire of RogerEbert.com gave it thumbs down, saying that the film was "a thoroughly unpleasant experience from start to finish, and not even in an artful way."

Noel Murray of LA Times criticized Christensen's performance and the script, while praising the film's gloomy ambience. He said that "the individual scenes feel disconnected and incomplete, stitched together by rambling, discombobulated dialogue that even the actors don’t seem to understand. The premise is effectively eerie; the presentation depressingly sloppy."
