= Champs 12 =

Argentine television series

- Genre: Soap opera Teen drama
- Created by: Dori Media
- Starring: Liz Solari; Tomás de las Heras; Silvia Kutica; Calu Rivero; Bárbara Attias; Salo Pasik; Fabiana García Lago
- Opening theme: No Quiero by Silicon Fly

Production
- Production locations: Buenos Aires, Argentina
- Running time: 45 minutes

Original release
- Network: América TV
- Release: March 16, 2009 – September 8, 2010

Champs 12 was an Argentine teen soap opera starring Liz Solari and Tomás de las Heras, broadcast by América TV. The show premiered on March 16, 2009, and aired its finale on September 8, 2010.

Initially, the show was scheduled at 8:00 p.m., and then it was moved to 11:15 p.m. On July 6, it was rescheduled again and moved to 9:15 p.m.
