= Jorge Solari =

Argentine footballer and manager (born 1941)

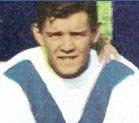
- Solari with Vélez Sarsfield

Personal information
- Full name: Jorge Raúl Solari
- Date of birth: 11 November 1941 (age 84)
- Place of birth: Buenos Aires, Argentina
- Position: Midfielder

Senior career*
Years	Team	Apps	(Gls)
1960–1961	Newell's Old Boys		
1962–1963	Vélez Sarsfield		
1964–1969	River Plate		
1970	Estudiantes		
1971–1972	Torreón		

International career
1966–1969	Argentina	3	(0)

Managerial career
- 1973: Rosario Central
- Tecos UAG
- Atlético Junior
- 1977–1978: Millonarios
- 1978–1979: Club Renato Cesarini
- 1980: Vélez Sársfield
- 1981–1983: Club Renato Cesarini
- 1983–1987: Newell's Old Boys
- 1987–1989: Independiente
- 1990–1992: Tenerife
- Club Renato Cesarini
- 1993: Newell's Old Boys
- 1994: Saudi Arabia
- 1995: Yokohama Marinos
- 1995: Rosario Central
- 1997: Club América
- 1998: Aldosivi
- Club Renato Cesarini
- 2000: Huachipato
- 2002: Argentinos Juniors
- 2003: Barcelona SC
- 2003–2004: Almagro
- 2004: Tiro Federal
- 2004–2005: Barcelona SC
- 2005: Almagro
- 2005–2006: Tiro Federal
- 2006–2008: Atlético Tucumán
- 2016: Coronel Aguirre
- * Club domestic league appearances and goals

Jorge Raúl Solari (born 11 November 1941) is an Argentine former football player and manager.

== Playing career ==
Solari, nicknamed "El Indio" ("The Indian"), played as a midfielder for several clubs in Argentina, he started his career with Newell's Old Boys in 1960. In 1962, he signed for Vélez Sársfield and in 1964 he joined River Plate. Solari represented Argentina in the 1966 FIFA World Cup. Solari left River in 1969 and had a short spell with Estudiantes before his retirement.

He also played in the Primera División de México for Torreón.

== Managerial career ==
Solari's managerial style was often characterized by tactical discipline and an ability to instill professionalism and competitive spirit in his teams.

=== Early Career and South America ===
Solari began his coaching career in the early 1970s, managing his former club Rosario Central and later moving to Mexico with Tecos UAG. His early career also included successful spells in Colombian football with Millonarios (1977–1978) and Atlético Junior (early 1980s). His title win with Independiente in the 1988–89 season was a career highlight, securing the club's 14th domestic championship.

He had a significant and foundational tenure at Newell's Old Boys (1983–1987), where he helped build the core of the team that would later achieve domestic and international success.

=== Stint in Spain: Tenerife ===
Solari managed Tenerife in La Liga from 1990 to 1992. He is credited with successfully stabilizing the team and ensuring its status in the top flight. Solari left the club in April 1992, just weeks before his successor, Jorge Valdano, managed the famous final match against Real Madrid that denied the Spanish giants the league title in the final game. Solari's work, however, laid the groundwork for the club's stability.

=== The 1994 World Cup: Saudi Arabia ===
In 1994, Solari took charge of the Saudi Arabia national football team just before the FIFA World Cup in the United States. His tenure is considered a historic success for Asian football. In their first-ever World Cup appearance, Solari guided the team out of the group stage, defeating both Morocco and Belgium. Saudi Arabia was eliminated by Sweden in the Round of 16, but their performance remains one of the most successful World Cup campaigns by an Asian team.

=== Later Managerial Career ===
Following the World Cup, Solari continued to manage extensively across several countries. This included a return to Rosario Central in 1995 and a stint with Club América in Mexico (1996). Solari also enjoyed success in the lower tiers of Argentine football, including guiding Almagro to promotion to the Primera División in 2004 and winning the Torneo Argentino A with Atlético Tucumán in 2008.

== Personal life ==
Solari came from a sporting family: his brother Eduardo, three of his nephews, Santiago, Esteban and David, were also footballers, as was his grandson Augusto, while his daughter Natalia married Fernando Redondo. His niece, Liz, worked as an actress.

== Managerial statistics ==
Team	From	To	Record				
Team	From	To	G	W	D	L	Win %
Yokohama Marinos	1995	1995	16	11	0	5	68.75
Total			16	11	0	5	68.75
