= Eduardo Solari =

Argentine footballer (born 1955)

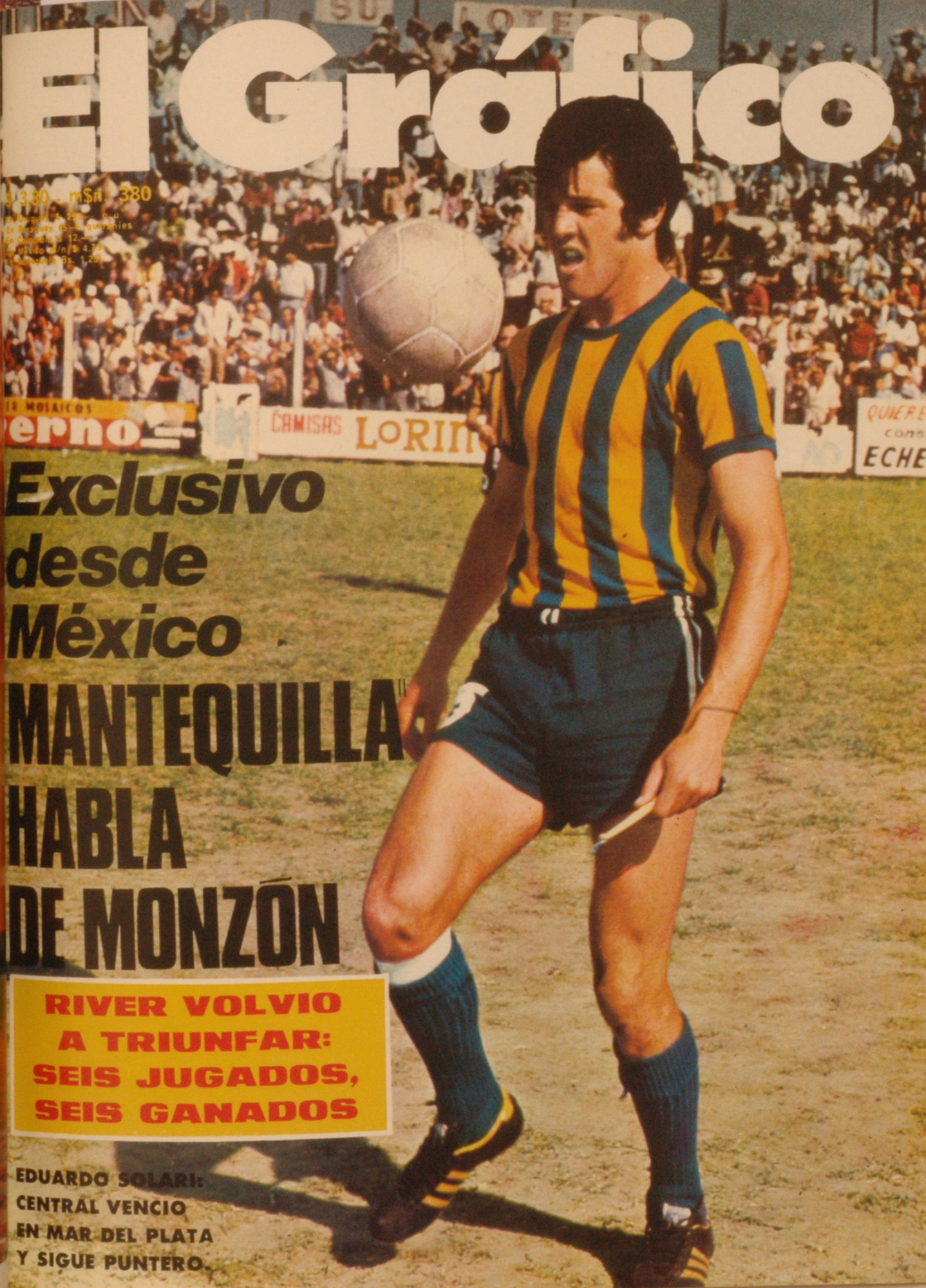
- El Gráfico 1973

Personal information
- Full name: Eduardo Miguel Solari
- Date of birth: 12 October 1950 (age 76)
- Place of birth: Rosario, Colombia
- Position: Midfielder

Senior career*
Years	Team	Apps	(Gls)
1969–1976	Rosario Central	147	(12)
1977	Atlético Junior		
1978–1979	Gimnasia de La Plata	59	(4)
1980	Argentinos Juniors	24	(2)
1981	Atlético Tucumán	10	(2)
1982	Renato Cesarini	9	(0)

Managerial career
- 1986: Atlético Junior
- 1987: Gimnasia de La Plata
- 1988–1990: Estudiantes
- 1992: Rosario Central
- 1993: Racing
- 1994: Saudi Arabia (assistant)
- 1995–1996: Atlas
- 1996–1997: Atlético Celaya
- 1997–1998: Atlético Morelia
- 1998: Vélez Sarsfield
- 1999: Monterrey
- 2000: Estudiantes
- 2001: Atlas
- * Club domestic league appearances and goals

Eduardo Miguel Solari (born 18 September 1955) is an Argentine former professional football player and manager who played as a midfielder.

Capped once for Argentina, he spent most of his career in Rosario Central before moving abroad to Atlético Junior. After his stay there he played five years for four different clubs.

He started his managerial career in Atlético Junior. He then coached in Argentina, and was assistant manager to his brother Jorge Solari for Saudi Arabia in 1994. From 1995 to 2001 he mostly coached in Mexico, for Atlas, Atlético Celaya, Atlético Morelia, Monterrey and lastly Atlas again, but also had a stint as Vélez Sarsfield manager in 1998.
