= Esteban Solari =

Argentine football player and manager (born 1980)

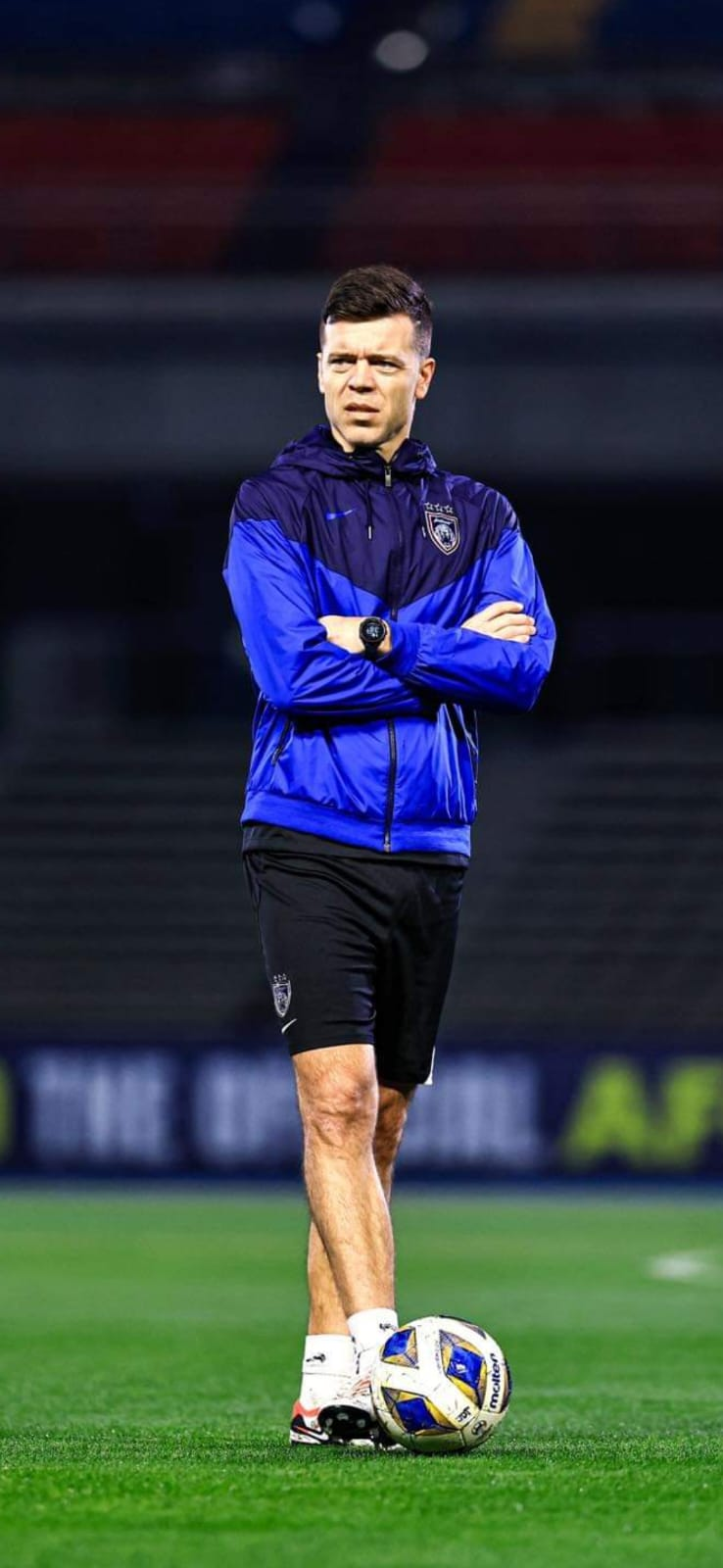
- Solari as Johor Darul Ta'zim manager in 2023

Personal information
- Full name: Esteban Andrés Solari Poggio
- Date of birth: 2 June 1980 (age 46)
- Place of birth: Rosario, Argentina
- Height: 1.73 m (5 ft 8 in)
- Position: Forward

Team information
- Current team: Pumas UNAM (head coach)

Youth career
- 1993–1995: Renato Cesarini
- 1995–1998: River Plate
- 1999–2000: Vélez Sarsfield

Senior career*
Years	Team	Apps	(Gls)
2001	Estudiantes	9	(0)
2001–2002	Defensa y Justicia	15	(7)
2002	Argentinos Juniors	4	(0)
2003	Gimnasia Jujuy	13	(4)
2003–2004	Chioggia	18	(12)
2004–2005	Lierse	23	(5)
2005–2007	APOEL	44	(34)
2007–2008	Pumas UNAM	40	(25)
2008–2010	Almería	10	(1)
2010–2013	APOEL	62	(22)
2013	Apollon Limassol	11	(7)
2013–2014	Skoda Xanthi	34	(16)
2014	Dalian Aerbin	11	(0)
2015	Ergotelis	9	(1)
2015	Deportivo Cuenca	13	(10)
2016	Aucas	35	(10)
Total		351	(154)

Managerial career
- 2019–2022: Argentina U20 (assistant)
- 2020–2022: Argentina U23 (assistant)
- 2022–2023: Johor Darul Ta'zim
- 2024: Everton Viña del Mar
- 2025: Godoy Cruz
- 2025–2026: Pachuca
- 2026–: Pumas UNAM
- * Club domestic league appearances and goals

Esteban Andrés Solari Poggio (Spanish pronunciation: [esˈteβan soˈlaɾi]; born 2 June 1980) is an Argentine football manager and former professional player who played as a forward. He is the current head coach of Liga MX club Pumas UNAM.

== Playing career ==
Solari was born in Rosario, Santa Fe. After emerging through Vélez Sarsfield's youth ranks, he made his professional debut with Estudiantes de La Plata. He also represented in his country Defensa y Justicia, Argentinos Juniors and Gimnasia de Jujuy.

After one year in Italy with amateurs Chioggia, Solari joined Lierse in the Belgian Pro League in summer 2004, scoring five goals in his only season to help his team finish in tenth position. Subsequently, he signed for APOEL in Cyprus, extending his contract until 2008 after impressing in his first year – 14 league goals in only 16 starts, winning the Cypriot Cup.

Solari finished top scorer in the First Division in 2006–07 (20 goals), as the Nicosia-based club won its third national championship in six years. He was also voted the league's MVP but, at the end of May 2007, agreed on a transfer to Pumas UNAM of Mexico, once again winning an individual scoring accolade after netting 14 times in the Apertura.

On 15 June 2008, Solari was transferred to Almería, who paid €3.8 million to Pumas UNAM. He made his Spanish La Liga debut on 31 August, in a 3–1 away win against Athletic Bilbao where he came on as a late substitute. He finished his first season with just eight games, scoring his only league goal – three overall – for the Andalusians in the 2–1 loss at Numancia.

On 2 June 2010, the 30-year-old Solari signed for three years with former club APOEL. He immediately made an impact by scoring four goals in six appearances in that season's UEFA Europa League, going on to add 11 in 28 in the domestic league, which again was claimed.

All rounds included, Solari took part in 12 games in his team's 2011–12 UEFA Champions League campaign. On 4 April 2012, he scored from a penalty kick in a 5–2 quarter-final defeat against Real Madrid at the Santiago Bernabéu Stadium (8–2 on aggregate).

Solari was hit by several injuries in 2012–13 and, as a result, appeared in only three matches in all competitions. On 5 January 2013, his contract with APOEL was terminated by mutual consent, and he joined Apollon Limassol of the same league later that month.

On 16 July 2013, Solari moved teams and countries again, penning a deal at Super League Greece club Skoda Xanthi. One year later, having been crowned the competition's top scorer, he signed for Dalian Aerbin from the Chinese Super League.

Solari returned to Greece and its top flight on 6 February 2015, signing a six-month contract with Ergotelis. He subsequently competed in the Ecuadorian Serie A, with Deportivo Cuenca and Aucas.

== Coaching career ==
In late 2018, Solari was named Fernando Batista's assistant at the Argentina under-20 team. The pair worked together at the 2019 FIFA World Cup in Poland and later with the under-23 side at the 2020 Summer Olympics, with the latter competition being delayed due to the COVID-19 pandemic.

Solari was appointed head coach of Johor Darul Ta'zim on 1 December 2022, replacing his compatriot Héctor Bidoglio who stepped down to become technical director of the Malaysia Super League club. He became the first manager in their history to win all four titles in one season, with 39 wins in 43 matches (90.70% points); additionally, the side was the first to score 100 goals in a single league.

On 13 March 2024, Solari signed for Everton de Viña del Mar in the Chilean Primera División. On 26 November, after winning 15 of his 33 games in charge and qualifying his team for the Copa Sudamericana, he left by mutual consent.

Solari became head coach of Godoy Cruz in the Argentine Primera División on 14 February 2025. He worked in the Mexican Liga MX after leaving, with Pachuca and UNAM, being appointed at the latter 18 years after his spell as a player.

== Personal life ==
Solari was nicknamed Tano, which means 'Italian' in Argentinian slang. His father Eduardo and two of his four siblings, the elder Santiago and younger David, were also footballers, with the former playing with individual and team success for Real Madrid and Inter Milan; his uncle Jorge represented several clubs during his career, mostly River Plate, whilst cousin through marriage Fernando Redondo also appeared for Real Madrid.

Solari's sister, Liz, works as an actress.

== Managerial statistics ==
As of match played 21 November 2026

Managerial record by team and tenure
Team	Nat	From	To	Record							
Team	Nat	From	To	G	W	D	L	GF	GA	GD	Win %
Johor Darul Ta'zim	(Malaysia)	1 December 2022	28 December 2023	44	40	1	3	164	25	+139	90.91
Everton Viña del Mar	(Chile)	13 March 2024	26 November 2024	32	14	8	10	49	42	+7	43.75
Godoy Cruz	(Argentina)	14 February 2025	8 August 2025	22	5	12	5	20	22	−2	22.73
Pachuca	(Mexico)	15 November 2025	8 June 2026	23	13	4	6	33	23	+10	56.52
Pumas UNAM	(Mexico)	21 June 2026	Present	20	5	7	8	25	34	−9	25.00
Career Total				141	77	32	32	291	146	+145	54.61

== Honours ==
=== Player ===
APOEL

- Cypriot First Division: 2006–07, 2010–11
- Cypriot Cup: 2005–06
- Cypriot Super Cup: 2011

Apollon Limassol

- Cypriot Cup: 2012–13

Individual

- Cypriot First Division MVP: 2006–07
- Cypriot First Division top scorer: 2006–07
- Super League Greece top scorer: 2013–14

=== Manager ===
Johor Darul Ta'zim

- Malaysia Super League: 2023
- Malaysia FA Cup: 2023
- Piala Sumbangsih: 2023
- Malaysia Cup: 2023
