= Capitán Solari =

Coordinates: 26°48′S 59°34′W

- Municipality and village
- Interactive map of Capitán Solari
- Country: Argentina
- Province: Chaco Province
- Time zone: UTC−3 (ART)

Capitán Solari is a village and municipality in the Sargento Cabral department in Chaco Province in northern Argentina.
