= David Solari (footballer) =

Argentine footballer (born 1986)

Personal information
- Full name: David Eduardo Solari Poggio
- Date of birth: 21 March 1986 (age 40)
- Place of birth: Barranquilla, Colombia
- Height: 1.85 m (6 ft 1 in)
- Position: Forward

Youth career
- 1996–2002: Club Renato Cesarini
- 2002–2003: Venezia
- 2003–2005: Chioggia

Senior career*
Years	Team	Apps	(Gls)
2003–2008	Chioggia	14	(5)
2005–2007	→ Independiente (loan)	7	(0)
2008	Olimpo	4	(0)
2008	Espoli	10	(3)
2009–2010	Deportivo Táchira	14	(2)
2010–2011	AEP Paphos	27	(7)
2011	Alki Larnaca	6	(1)
2012–2013	Hapoel Ironi Kiryat Shmona	22	(5)
2013–2015	F.C. Ashdod	38	(10)
2015	Maccabi Petah Tikva	6	(0)
2015–2016	Hapoel Afula	19	(5)
2016–2017	Central Córdoba de Rosario		
2017–2018	Enosis Neon Paralimni	23	(12)
2018–2019	Othellos Athienou	27	(25)
2019–2020	ASIL Lysi	14	(8)
- * Club domestic league appearances and goals

David Eduardo Solari Poggio (born 21 March 1986) is an Argentine footballer who plays as a forward.

== Career ==
During the 2011/12 season, he played for Hapoel Ironi Kiryat Shmona, an underdog team in the Israeli Premier League. He was one of the stars of the team as they shockingly won the championship title with a 14-point gap, as well as the Toto Cup.

On 23 May 2019, it was confirmed, that Solari had joined ASIL Lysi for the 2019–20 season.

== Personal life ==
Solari's parents are Eduardo Miguel Solari – a former footballer – and Alicia Susana Poggio. Hailing from a footballing family, his uncle Jorge (father-in-law of Fernando Redondo) and his brothers Santiago and Esteban were also professional players, while his sister, Liz Solari, worked as an actress.

== Honours ==
Hapoel Ironi Kiryat Shmona

- Toto Cup: 2011–12
- Israeli Premier League: 2011–12

Enosis Neon Paralimni

- Cypriot Second Division: 2017–18
