= Club Renato Cesarini =

Argentine professional association football club

Renato Cesarini
- Full name: Club Renato Cesarini
- Founded: 15 January 1975; 51 years ago
- Ground: Renato Cesarini

The Club Renato Cesarini is an Argentine association football club and sports school based in the city of Rosario, Argentina. It was formally founded on 15 January 1975.

At a historical level, the club has stood out by producing great players such as the following; Roberto Sensini, Fabián Cubero, Santiago Solari, Javier Mascherano, Martín Demichelis, Pablo Piatti, among others.

The team played in the Argentine Primera División, previously known as the National Championship, on several occasions. He has also played other official tournaments such as the Torneo Argentino A and Torneo Argentino B. At the regional level he has played in tournaments organized by the Asociación Rosarina de Fútbol, such as the Campeonato de Fútbol de Rosario, where he became champion on several occasions.

== History ==
The Club Renato Cesarini is a sports institution founded on 15 January 1975, by Jorge Solari, Eduardo Solari and the brothers Daniel and Ermindo Onega. It was founded in honor of the former soccer player Renato Cesarini, an Italian nationalized Argentine who stood out at River Plate and in Europe with the Italian club Juventus; he won titles with both clubs. He was also a coach with both clubs.

It has a sports complex where there are 50 soccer fields.

=== First championship and arrival to the AFA ===
Starting in 1967, the clubs from the interior of the country began to participate in a new competition of the Argentine Football Association, exclusive for the champion clubs of the regional leagues of the country: the Regional Tournament, which had the objective of classifying the best to the National Championship, a new First Division competition, parallel to the regular competition. However, because the best teams in the Rosario and Santa Fe leagues were already affiliated, the province was excluded from the competition until 1971.

The club would quickly gain access to the tournament. Despite being a newly founded club, it managed to win the Rosarino Championship in 1978, breaking a 10-year streak of championships won only by Newell's Old Boys and Rosario Central.

On 18 February 1979, the club made its debut in the Torneo Regional, beating Gimnasia y Esgrima 3 to 1 and then winning as a visitor and due to the ordering of the teams, they qualifying directly to the Third Phase, where it would end up falling in both games against Chaco For Ever, being left out of the final.

== Trajectory ==
=== Large tournaments participated ===
- Primera Division de Argentina
- Torneo Argentino A
- Torneo Argentino B
- Campeonato de Fútbol de Rosario

== Honors ==
=== Regional tournaments ===
- Torneo Hermenegildo Ivancich (1): 1998
- Torneo Gobernador Luciano Molinas (3): 1978, 1995 and 2004

=== National tournaments ===
- Torneo Regional (2): 1982 and 1983

== Rivalries ==
Within the scope of the Asociación Rosarina de Fútbol, Renato Cesarini does not have a clear classic rival. However, the appearance in recent years of an entity with similar characteristics, called the Asociación Atlética Jorge Griffa (named in honor of another great trainer of football players from Rosario, in a similar way to Cesarini), generates an interesting duel between two clubs with characteristics of sports training schools, in the Rosario area.

== See also ==
- Football in Argentina
- Rosario
