= Jakarta (disambiguation) =

Jakarta is the largest city of Indonesia.

Jakarta may also refer to:

- Jakarta (band), a Serbian and Yugoslav rock band
- Jakarta (DJ), an electronic music band known for the hit "One Desire"
- Jakarta (mango), a named mango cultivar from Florida
- Jakarta EE, a set of specifications, extending Java SE
- Jakarta metropolitan area, the metropolitan area including Jakarta and the satellite cities
- Jakarta Project, a software project
- Jakarta!, 2012 novel by Christophe Dorigné-Thomson

== See also ==
- Jayakarta (train), passenger train
- DKI (disambiguation)
