= Julieta Sciancalepore =

Argentine dancer

- Born: June 6, 1987 (age 39); Entre Ríos, Argentina
- Occupations: Dancer
- Years active: 2010–present
- relatives: Marcelo Tinelli

Julieta Sciancalepore (born June 6, 1987) is an Argentine dancer from Concepción del Uruguay, Entre Ríos, Argentina who became known for being on the Argentine version of Bailando por un Sueño 2011.

== Early life ==
Julieta Sciancalepore was born on June 6, 1987, in Concepción del Uruguay, Entre Ríos, Argentina. She's an only daughter, her mother died when she was 17 years old, and since then her relationship with her father Armando grew. She studied Ballet since she was 6 years old. Her passion has always been dancing. At the age of 18, Sciancalepore moved to Buenos Aires, where she took the last four subjects to become a psychologist.

== Career ==
She started her career in television as a dancer in the program Sábado Show (Saturday Show), hosted by Jose María Listorti and Denise Dumas. At the same time Sciancalepore was part of the cast of the entertainment program Preparen, Apuesten, Juego presented by Freddy Villarreal. The following year she was chosen to be on one of Argentina's most popular TV shows, Bailando Por Un Sueño 2011, as the dance partner of the recently known producer Peter Alfonso, representing Casa del Menor Concepción Del Uruguay, an institution that provides care for 96 children in vulnerable conditions. By mid April 2011, Sciancalepore was linked in an affair with her dance partner, which she had always denied, until Alfonso said that he was in a relationship with Argentine top model Paula Chaves. Towards the middle of the year she started rehearsing for the musical Hembras, a play about Contemporary dance and Lyrical Jazz which represents the universe of women in different emotional states, whatever their ethnicity, anatomy, creed and religion. The cast consists of Cleria Zangari, Pilar de Santadina, Maria Mercedes Speroni, Sol Maria Montero, Yvonne Jaureguialzo, Luciana Larocca and Jorgelina Balerdi. Julieta has always been recognized as one of the most beautiful women on the competition and as a great dancer as well. On December 16, Sciancalepore and Peter Alfonso were eliminated via phone vote with 43.02% of public support, losing to singer Coki Ramírez and professional dancer Leandro Nimo, finishing in 5th place out of 30 contestants. Previously, the couple eliminated the actress/model Eugenia Lemos, winner of the show, Soñando por Bailar, with 74.09% of the votes. Out of the show, Julieta and Peter keep on helping the institution through donations. On December 26, Sciancalepore joined the reality show Soñando por Bailar 2012, where she is the partenaire of contestant Facundo Gonzalez. Facundo was eliminated on February 6, but he and Julieta were chosen to stay in the competition by the public.

== Television ==
Year	Program	Channel	Participation
2010	Sabado Show	Canal Trece	Dancer
2011	Preparen, Apuesten, Juego	Canal Trece	Dancer
2011	Bailando por un sueño	Canal Trece	Dancer
2011	La cocina del Show	Canal Trece	Invited
2012	Soñando por Bailar 2012	Canal Trece	Dancer

== Theatre ==
Year	Play	Director	Role
2011	Hembras	Ana Azcurra	Dancer

== See also ==
- Sábado Show
- Bailando por un sueño 2011
- Soñando por Bailar 2012
