= Alive! (Mondotek song) =

Single by Mondotek

from the album Génération Mondotek
- Released: November 30, 2007
- Genre: Electro house
- Length: 3:28
- Label: Mercury
- Songwriter(s): Stephan Endemann; Dragan Hecimovic
- Producer(s): Stephan Endemann; Dragan Hecimovic

Mondotek singles chronology
"Alive!" (2007)	"D-Generation" (2008)

"Alive!" is a song by the German electronic music group Mondotek. It was released on November 30, 2007, as the lead single for their debut studio album, Génération Mondotek (2007).

The song is known for its music video, which performs Tecktonik dancers. The single reached in several charts of European countries including the Netherlands and Switzerland. "Alive!" achieves the best performance in France and Belgium, reaching the second position.

== Track listings ==
- CD single
1. "Alive!" (Short Version) - 3:11
2. "Alive!" (Ph Electro Remix) - 6:01
- 12" maxi
1. "Alive!" (Ph Electro Remix) - 6:01
2. "Alive!" (Vinyl Lickers Remix) - 6:05
- CD maxi single
1. "Alive!" (PH Electro Radio Mix) - 3:43
2. "Alive!" (Radio Edit) - 3:28
3. "Alive!" (2-4 Grooves Remix radio) - 3:22
4. "Alive!" (Vinyl Lickers Short Cut) - 3:30
5. "Alive!" (PH Electro Remix) - 6:04
6. "Alive!" (Original Club Mix) - 5:46
7. "Alive!" (2-4 Grooves Remix) - 6:18
8. "Alive!" (Master & Servant Remix) - 6:59
9. "Alive!" (Extra Video)

== Charts ==
=== Weekly charts ===
Chart (2007–08)	Peak position
Belgium (Ultratip Bubbling Under Wallonia)	1
Belgium (Ultratop 50 Wallonia)	2
Belgium (Ultratop Dance Wallonia)	21
CIS Airplay (TopHit)	26
France (SNEP)	2
Germany (GfK)	84
Netherlands (Single Top 100)	73
Russia Airplay (TopHit)	25
Switzerland (Schweizer Hitparade)	44

=== Year-end charts ===
Chart (2008)	Position
CIS (Tophit)	99
Russia Airplay (TopHit)	39

=== Decade-end charts ===
Decade-end chart performance for "Alive!"
Chart (2000–2009)	Position
Russia Airplay (TopHit)	148
