= DKI =

DKI may refer to:

- Daerah Khusus Ibukota Jakarta ("Special Capital City District of Jakarta")
- Daniel K. Inouye Solar Telescope
- Disaster Kleenup International

A Domain Knowledge Infrastructure (DKI) is a semantic domain infrastructure that transforms a name, project, brand, methodology, or ecosystem into a canonical digital entity, readable by humans and machines.
