= Soñando por Bailar 2012 =

- Also known as: Soñando por Bailar 2
- Directed by: Alejandro Ripoll
- Presented by: Santiago del Moro
- Opening theme: "Firework" by Katy Perry
- Country of origin: Argentina

Original release
- Network: El Trece
- Release: December 3, 2011 – May 6, 2012

Related
- Soñando por Bailar 2011

Soñando por Bailar 2012 was the second season of Soñando por Bailar, an Argentinian reality show broadcast by El Trece. Unlike the first season, this time the contestants were professional dancers and every week they received a score from 1 to 10. The winner of the show got the chance to dance in Bailando 2012 (as the first winner, Eugenia Lemos, who was a contestant in Bailando 2011).

The academy this season is placed in a castle in General Rodríguez. The show was hosted by Santiago del Moro and the jury are Marcelo Polino, Amalia Granata, Silvina Escudero, Reina Reech and Ángel de Brito.

The season premiered was on December 3, 2011 and the finale was on May 6, 2012. Magdalena Bravi was the big winner.

== Contestants ==
Name	Age	Professional Partner	Status
Salomé Calamonici	23	Marcos Gorosito	Eliminated 1st by the 9.72%
Gabriela Flores	19	Leonardo Piccinato	Eliminated 2nd by the 10.34%
Emanuel Alegre	26	Ana Laura López	Eliminated 3rd by the 1.05%
Julieta Carbonell	25	Pablo Juin^{[c]}	Eliminated 4th by the 7.56%
Rubén Silva	25	Sabrina Lis Gay	Eliminated 5th by the 8.47%
Carolina Puntonet	27	Eliseo Álvarez	Eliminated 6th by the 14.12%
Mariano Rodríguez	23	Gisela Soto	Eliminated 7th by the 8.49%
Yanina Iglesias	29	—	Disqualified
Vanesa Simón	23	—	Disqualified
Martín Parra	28	Judith Kovalovsky	Eliminated 8th by the 45.34%
Facundo González	22	Julieta Sciancalepore^{[d]}	Eliminated 9th by the 47.82%
Leandro Martínez	22	—	Quit
Daniela Pantano^{[f]}	26	Fernando Bertona	Eliminated 10th by the 41.65%
Julieta Gómez^{[g]}	26	Pablo Moiño	Eliminated 11th by the 41.83%
Soledad Cescato	23	Gabriel Usandivaras^{[b]}	Eliminated 12th by the 14.21%
Rubén Silva	25	Sabrina Lis Gay	Eliminated 13th by the 47.22%
Clara Douradinha	24	Daniel Amador	Eliminated 14th by the 31.71%
Nicolás Ramírez	26	Bárbara Reali	Eliminated 15th by the 11.24%
Agustín Morgante	25	María Lourdes Sánchez	Eliminated 16th by the 15.05%
Franco Mariano Ibañez	23	Romina Parodi	Eliminated 17th by the 47.82%
Maribel Varela	18	Ariel Juárez	Eliminated 18th by the 11.49%
Julieta Ponce	20	Jorge Moliniers	Eliminated 19th by the 16.14%
Ana Izaguirre	21	Emanuel González	Eliminated 20th by the 7.01%
Yanina Iglesias	29	Leandro Delpiero	Eliminated 21st by the 14.89%
Facundo González	22	Julieta Sciancalepore	Eliminated 22nd by the 7.79%
Joaquín Starosta	24	Verónica Moretti	Eliminated 23rd by the 27.69%
Augusto Buccafusco	23	Grace Quelas	Semifinalist by the 47.82%
Federico Baldino	26	Laura Fernández	Semifinalist by the 38.15%
Mariano de la Canal	25	Nadia Hair^{[a]}	Runners-Up by the 45.38%
Magdalena Bravi	25	Maro Riccardini	Winners by the 54.62%

- ^[a] Belén Alonso was the original partner, but she left the competition after Reggaeton's round. Later, Yanil García replaced her during Disco and Cumbia's round; but she left the competition, too.
- ^[b] Nicolás Scillama was the original partner, but he left the competition after Disco's round.
- ^[c] Rodrigo Escobar was the original partner, but he left the competition after Cumbia's round.
- ^[d] Marién Caballero was the original partner, but she left the competition after Cumbia's round.
- ^[f] Yanina Iglesias was disqualified because of breaking the rules; in order to replace her, Daniela entered to the show partnered with Yanina's dancer.
- ^[g] Vanesa Simón was disqualified because of breaking the rules; in order to replace her, Julieta G. entered to the show partnered with Vanesa's dancer.
- Facundo González, Rubén Silva & Yanina Iglesias got the opportunity to come back into the competition.

== Semifinals ==
During this stage, 28 semifinalist were introduced in four groups of seven. One semifinalist from each group was eliminated, leaving 24 finalists that would be starting the competition.

Contestant	Group	Result	Contestant	Group	Result
Ana Izaguirre	1	Advanced	Martín Parra	3	Advanced
Facundo González	1	Advanced	Clara Douradinha	3	Advanced
Carolina Puntonet	1	Advanced	Walter Collia	3	Eliminated
Augusto Buccafusco	1	Advanced	Julieta Carbonell	3	Advanced
Daniela Storto	1	Eliminated	Leandro Martínez	3	Advanced
Rubén Silva	1	Advanced	Soledad Cescato	3	Advanced
Vanesa Simón	1	Advanced	Nicolás Ramírez	3	Advanced
Nahuel Cetrangola	2	Eliminated	Maribel Varela	4	Advanced
Magdalena Bravi	2	Advanced	Mariano Rodríguez	4	Advanced
Agustín Morgante	2	Advanced	Florencia Catania	4	Eliminated
Julieta Ponce	2	Advanced	Yanina Iglesias	4	Advanced
Joaquín Starosta	2	Advanced	Mariano De la Canal	4	Advanced
Gabriela Flores	2	Advanced	Salomé Calamonici	4	Advanced
Federico Baldino	2	Advanced	Emanuel Alegre	4	Advanced

== Finals ==
The 24 finalists competed during 25 rounds. From the eight to the seventeenth round, the judges got the opportunity to save the contestants, leaving two of them in the bottom two: one contestant was going to be saved by the public vote, and the other was the eliminated. This season, two contestants were disqualified, one quit, and three got the opportunity to come back.

=== Top 24 – Reggaeton ===
Individual judges scores in the charts below (given in parentheses) are listed in this order from left to right: Silvina Escudero, Angel de Brito, Amalia Granata, Reina Reech, Marcelo Polino.

- Performances:

Dancers	Score	Result	Music
Ana Izaguirre	28 (6,4,7,7,4)	Safe	"Drop It on Me" – Ricky Martin feat. Daddy Yankee
Julieta Ponce	21 (6,3,5,5,2)	Safe	"Drop It on Me" – Ricky Martin feat. Daddy Yankee
Federico Baldino	13 (3,2,4,3,1)	Bottom 4	"Drop It on Me" – Ricky Martin feat. Daddy Yankee
Mariano Rodríguez	27 (7,3,6,7,4)	Safe	"Drop It on Me" – Ricky Martin feat. Daddy Yankee
Nicolás Ramírez	40 (9,10,8,9,4)	Safe	"Drop It on Me" – Ricky Martin feat. Daddy Yankee
Agustín Morgante	33 (7,7,7,8,4)	Safe	"Nadie lo Sabrá" – Croni-K
Rubén Silva	42 (9,10,8,9,6)	Safe	"Nadie lo Sabrá" – Croni-K
Yanina Iglesias	30 (6,6,7,7,4)	Safe	"Nadie lo Sabrá" – Croni-K
Clara Douradinha	30 (6,6,8,7,3)	Safe	"Nadie lo Sabrá" – Croni-K
Mariano De la Canal	23 (4,2,10,5,2)	Safe	"Nadie lo Sabrá" – Croni-K
Vanesa Simón	19 (4,3,5,5,2)	Safe	"Descontrol" – Daddy Yankee
Emanuel Alegre	40 (8,10,8,8,6)	Safe	"Descontrol" – Daddy Yankee
Gabriela Flores	23 (5,2,7,7,3)	Safe	"Descontrol" – Daddy Yankee
Leandro Martínez	31 (7,7,6,8,3)	Safe	"Descontrol" – Daddy Yankee
Augusto Buccafusco	27 (8,6,4,6,3)	Safe	"El Ritmo No Perdona" – Daddy Yankee
Martín Parra	29 (5,7,7,5,5)	Safe	"El Ritmo No Perdona" – Daddy Yankee
Julieta Carbonell	30 (7,5,7,7,4)	Safe	"El Ritmo No Perdona" – Daddy Yankee
Maribel Varela	38 (8,8,8,8,6)	Safe	"El Ritmo No Perdona" – Daddy Yankee
Soledad Cescato	34 (8,8,6,7,5)	Bottom 4	"El Ritmo No Perdona" – Daddy Yankee
Carolina Puntonet	17 (4,5,2,5,1)	Safe	"Abusadora" – Wisin & Yandel
Magdalena Bravi	34 (5,9,3,8,9)	Bottom 4	"Abusadora" – Wisin & Yandel
Facundo González	20 (5,8,2,3,2)	Safe	"Abusadora" – Wisin & Yandel
Joaquín Starosta	16 (5,1,5,3,2)	Safe	"Abusadora" – Wisin & Yandel
Salomé Calamonici	13 (3,2,2,5,1)	Eliminated	"Abusadora" – Wisin & Yandel

- Highest Score: Rubén Silva
- Bottom Four: Magdalena Bravi, Soledad Cescato, Federico Baldino & Salomé Calamonici
- Eliminated: Salomé Calamonici

=== Top 23 – Disco ===
- Performances:

Dancers	Score	Result	Music
Julieta Ponce	16 (6,2,2,5,1)	Safe	"Hung Up" – Madonna
Soledad Cescato	32 (9,5,7,7,4)	Safe	"Hung Up" – Madonna
Federico Baldino	26 (7,4,6,6,3)	Bottom 5	"Hung Up" – Madonna
Leandro Martínez	30 (8,4,6,7,5)	Safe	"Hung Up" – Madonna
Julieta Carbonell	35 (8,7,8,7,5)	Safe	"Hush Hush" – Pussycat Dolls
Yanina Iglesias	28 (8,5,5,6,4)	Bottom 5	"Hush Hush" – Pussycat Dolls
Emanuel Alegre	44 (10,10,9,9,6)	Safe	"Hush Hush" – Pussycat Dolls
Joaquín Starosta	35 (8,8,8,7,4)	Safe	"Hush Hush" – Pussycat Dolls
Rubén Silva	37 (8,8,7,8,6)	Safe	"Hush Hush" – Pussycat Dolls
Martín Parra	31 (8,5,7,7,4)	Safe	"Disco Inferno" – The Trammps
Carolina Puntonet	33 (7,7,7,8,4)	Safe	"Disco Inferno" – The Trammps
Gabriela Flores	31 (7,6,7,8,3)	Eliminated	"Disco Inferno" – The Trammps
Agustín Morgante	38 (8,9,7,8,6)	Safe	"Disco Inferno" – The Trammps
Mariano Rodríguez	34 (8,6,8,8,4)	Safe	"Disco Inferno" – The Trammps
Nicolás Ramírez	27 (9,4,2,8,4)	Safe	"Last Dance" – Donna Summer
Augusto Buccafusco	38 (8,7,7,9,5)	Safe	"Last Dance" – Donna Summer
Vanesa Simón	33 (7,8,7,7,4)	Safe	"Last Dance" – Donna Summer
Maribel Varela	39 (9,9,8,8,5)	Bottom 5	"Last Dance" – Donna Summer
Mariano De la Canal	23 (3,6,4,5,5)	Safe	"Last Dance" – Donna Summer
Facundo González	5 (1,1,1,1,1)	Bottom 5	"Sexual Revolution" – Macy Gray
Magdalena Bravi	38 (8,6,8,9,7)	Safe	"Sexual Revolution" – Macy Gray
Clara Douradinha	33 (7,6,8,8,4)	Safe	"Sexual Revolution" – Macy Gray
Ana Izaguirre	30 (6,6,7,7,4)	Safe	"Sexual Revolution" – Macy Gray

- Highest Score: Emanuel Alegre
- Bottom Five: Maribel Varela, Yanina Iglesias, Federico Baldino, Facundo González & Gabriela Flores
- Eliminated: Gabriela Flores

=== Top 22 – Cumbia ===
- Performances:

Dancers	Score	Result	Music
Julieta Carbonell	18 (4,4,3,5,2)	Bottom 9	"Nunca me Faltes" – Antonio Ríos
Martín Parra	27 (8,6,6,5,2)	Safe	"Nunca me Faltes" – Antonio Ríos
Magdalena Bravi	35 (8,7,7,9,4)	Safe	"Nunca me Faltes" – Antonio Ríos
Augusto Buccafusco	27 (7,7,5,5,3)	Bottom 9	"Nunca me Faltes" – Antonio Ríos
Joaquín Starosta	25 (6,6,5,5,3)	Safe	"Corazón Valiente" – Gilda
Maribel Varela	38 (8,8,8,8,6)	Safe	"Corazón Valiente" – Gilda
Mariano Rodríguez	28 (7,4,7,7,3)	Bottom 9	"Corazón Valiente" – Gilda
Julieta Ponce	27 (6,7,5,6,3)	Bottom 9	"Corazón Valiente" – Gilda
Emanuel Alegre	32 (8,8,7,7,2)	Eliminated	"Agüita" – Ráfaga
Federico Baldino	30 (6,6,8,7,3)	Bottom 9	"Agüita" – Ráfaga
Yanina Iglesias	33 (8,6,8,6,5)	Safe	"Agüita" – Ráfaga
Mariano De la Canal	24 (5,6,5,4,4)	Safe	"Agüita" – Ráfaga
Vanesa Simón	25 (6,5,6,5,3)	Bottom 9	"Agüita" – Ráfaga
Clara Douradinha	24 (5,5,5,6,3)	Safe	"Bombón Asesino" – Los Palmeras
Facundo González	25 (6,7,4,5,3)	Safe	"Bombón Asesino" – Los Palmeras
Soledad Cescato	40 (8,9,9,9,5)	Safe	"Bombón Asesino" – Los Palmeras
Nicolás Ramírez	26 (8,1,4,6,7)	Bottom 9	"Bombón Asesino" – Los Palmeras
Leandro Martínez	14 (4,2,3,4,1)	Bottom 9	"Bombón Asesino" – Los Palmeras
Agustín Morgante	27 (7,6,4,7,3)	Safe	"Luna Luna" – Ráfaga
Ana Izaguirre	30 (6,5,8,8,3)	Safe	"Luna Luna" – Ráfaga
Rubén Silva	29 (7,8,6,6,2)	Safe	"Luna Luna" – Ráfaga
Carolina Puntonet	17 (4,4,4,4,1)	Safe	"Luna Luna" – Ráfaga

- Highest Score: Soledad Cescato
- Bottom Nine: Leandro Martínez, Julieta Ponce, Julieta Carbonell, Vanesa Simón, Nicolás Ramírez, Federico Baldino, Augusto Buccafusco, Mariano Rodríguez & Emanuel Alegre
- Eliminated: Emanuel Alegre

=== Top 21 – Cuarteto ===
- Performances:

Dancers	Score	Result	Music
Augusto Buccafusco	31 (7,6,7,7,4)	Bottom 6	"Soy Cordobés" – Rodrigo
Maribel Varela	33 (8,7,8,8,2)	Bottom 6	"Soy Cordobés" – Rodrigo
Agustín Morgante	32 (6,8,6,6,6)	Safe	"Soy Cordobés" – Rodrigo
Magdalena Bravi	31 (7,5,6,7,6)	Safe	"Soy Cordobés" – Rodrigo
Ana Izaguirre	26 (5,2,4,8,7)	Safe	"Por Lo Que Yo Te Quiero" – Walter Olmos
Facundo González	22 (4,3,1,7,7)	Safe	"Por Lo Que Yo Te Quiero" – Walter Olmos
Joaquín Starosta	20 (5,3,2,5,5)	Safe	"Por Lo Que Yo Te Quiero" – Walter Olmos
Vanesa Simón	22 (5,4,5,5,3)	Safe	"Por Lo Que Yo Te Quiero" – Walter Olmos
Mariano Rodríguez	33 (8,6,8,6,5)	Bottom 6	"Por Lo Que Yo Te Quiero" – Walter Olmos
Rubén Silva	21 (5,4,4,6,2)	Safe	"Soy Un Adicto A Ti" – Walter Olmos
Clara Douradinha	28 (7,4,6,7,4)	Bottom 6	"Soy Un Adicto A Ti" – Walter Olmos
Carolina Puntonet	36 (7,8,8,8,5)	Safe	"Soy Un Adicto A Ti" – Walter Olmos
Leandro Martínez	25 (6,3,5,7,4)	Bottom 9	"Soy Un Adicto A Ti" – Walter Olmos
Julieta Carbonell	18 (4,4,3,5,2)	Eliminated	"Quiéreme" – Jean Carlos
Nicolás Ramírez	24 (5,3,5,6,5)	Safe	"Quiéreme" – Jean Carlos
Yanina Iglesias	43 (9,10,9,8,7)	Safe	"Quiéreme" – Jean Carlos
Mariano De la Canal	21 (5,1,6,5,4)	Safe	"Quiéreme" – Jean Carlos
Martín Parra	28 (6,3,8,7,4)	Safe	"Cómo Olvidarla" – Rodrigo
Soledad Cescato	35 (7,7,7,7,7)	Bottom 6	"Cómo Olvidarla" – Rodrigo
Federico Baldino	19 (5,2,3,5,4)	Safe	"Cómo Olvidarla" – Rodrigo
Julieta Ponce	25 (5,3,6,6,5)	Safe	"Cómo Olvidarla" – Rodrigo

- Highest Score: Yanina Iglesias
- Bottom Six: Augusto Buccafusco, Mariano Rodríguez, Maribel Varela, Soledad Cescato, Clara Douradinha & Julieta Carbonell
- Eliminated: Julieta Carbonell

=== Top 20 – Axé ===
- Performances:

Dancers	Score	Result	Music
Leandro Martínez	25 (6,3,7,7,2)	Safe	"Na Boquinha Da Garrafa" – Axé Bahia
Mariano Rodríguez	27 (7,3,8,6,3)	Safe	"Na Boquinha Da Garrafa" – Axé Bahia
Clara Douradinha	39 (9,8,9,9,4)	Bottom 7	"Na Boquinha Da Garrafa" – Axé Bahia
Joaquín Starosta	17 (5,3,2,3,4)	Bottom 7	"Na Boquinha Da Garrafa" – Axé Bahia
Julieta Ponce	24 (8,4,4,5,3)	Bottom 7	"Na Manteiga" – Terra Samba
Nicolás Ramírez	44 (10,10,9,9,6)	Safe	"Na Manteiga" – Terra Samba
Agustín Morgante	28 (6,3,7,8,4)	Bottom 7	"Na Manteiga" – Terra Samba
Soledad Cescato	33 (9,4,9,7,4)	Safe	"Na Manteiga" – Terra Samba
Vanesa Simón	19 (5,4,3,5,2)	Bottom 7	"Reboleia" – Axé Bahia
Martín Parra	20 (5,3,4,5,3)	Safe	"Reboleia" – Axé Bahia
Carolina Puntonet	24 (6,3,6,6,3)	Safe	"Reboleia" – Axé Bahia
Mariano De la Canal	31 (4,8,9,6,4)	Safe	"Reboleia" – Axé Bahia
Facundo González	21 (3,3,6,5,4)	Bottom 7	"Segura o Tchan" – É o Tchan!
Ana Izaguirre	30 (8,4,7,8,3)	Safe	"Segura o Tchan" – É o Tchan!
Rubén Silva	34 (8,7,7,7,5)	Eliminated	"Segura o Tchan" – É o Tchan!
Magdalena Bravi	31 (7,3,7,6,6)	Safe	"Segura o Tchan" – É o Tchan!
Maribel Varela	28 (6,6,6,7,3)	Safe	"Dança do Vampiro" – Asa de Águia
Augusto Buccafusco	21 (6,3,4,5,3)	Safe	"Dança do Vampiro" – Asa de Águia
Federico Baldino	20 (4,3,4,5,4)	Safe	"Dança do Vampiro" – Asa de Águia
Yanina Iglesias	39 (8,9,8,7,7)	Safe	"Dança do Vampiro" – Asa de Águia

- Highest Score: Nicolás Ramírez
- Bottom Seven: Joaquín Starosta, Clara Douradinha, Vanesa Simón, Agustín Morgante, Facundo González, Julieta Ponce & Rubén Silva
- Eliminated: Rubén Silva

=== Top 19 – Adagio ===
- Performances:

Dancers	Score	Result	Music
Ana Izaguirre	27 (6,7,5,6,3)	Safe	"Bedshaped" – Keane
Leandro Martínez	18 (4,3,6,4,1)	Safe	"Bedshaped" – Keane
Facundo González	30 (8,9,3,6,4)	Bottom 5	"Bedshaped" – Keane
Julieta Ponce	33 (7,7,8,7,4)	Safe	"Bedshaped" – Keane
Nicolás Ramírez	25 (6,5,5,6,3)	Safe	"Angels" – Robbie Williams
Augusto Buccafusco	28 (7,8,5,5,3)	Safe	"Angels" – Robbie Williams
Agustín Morgante	32 (7,9,5,7,4)	Safe	"Angels" – Robbie Williams
Yanina Iglesias	23 (5,5,5,5,3)	Safe	"Angels" – Robbie Williams
Maribel Varela	38 (9,9,9,8,3)	Bottom 5	"Total Eclipse of the Heart" – Glee
Clara Douradinha	19 (4,4,3,5,3)	Safe	"Total Eclipse of the Heart" – Glee
Federico Baldino	20 (4,4,7,3,2)	Safe	"Total Eclipse of the Heart" – Glee
Joaquín Starosta	24 (6,4,8,3,3)	Safe	"Total Eclipse of the Heart" – Glee
Martín Parra	27 (6,4,9,6,2)	Safe	"Without You" – Mariah Carey
Carolina Puntonet	17 (3,3,4,5,2)	Eliminated	"Without You" – Mariah Carey
Magdalena Bravi	44 (9,10,9,9,7)	Safe	"Without You" – Mariah Carey
Soledad Cescato	28 (5,9,7,5,2)	Bottom 5	"I Want to Know What Love Is" – Mariah Carey
Mariano Rodríguez	34 (7,9,9,6,3)	Safe	"I Want to Know What Love Is" – Mariah Carey
Vanesa Simón	18 (3,3,3,4,5)	Bottom 5	"I Want to Know What Love Is" – Mariah Carey
Mariano De la Canal	30 (5,8,6,7,4)	Safe	"I Want to Know What Love Is" – Mariah Carey

- Highest Score: Magdalena Bravi
- Bottom Five: Vanesa Simón, Maribel Varela, Facundo González, Soledad Cescato & Carolina Puntonet
- Eliminated: Carolina Puntonet

=== Top 18 – Latin Pop ===
- Performances:

Dancers	Score	Result	Music
Leandro Martínez	34 (7,5,9,9,4)	Safe	"Ave María" – David Bisbal
Maribel Varela	24 (6,4,6,6,2)	Safe	"Ave María" – David Bisbal
Mariano De la Canal	20 (8,3,4,3,2)	Safe	"Ave María" – David Bisbal
Ana Izaguirre	23 (6,3,6,6,2)	Bottom 7	"Caprichosa" – Chayanne
Augusto Buccafusco	29 (9,1,7,7,5)	Bottom 7	"Caprichosa" – Chayanne
Federico Baldino	33 (9,7,7,8,2)	Bottom 7	"Caprichosa" – Chayanne
Vanesa Simón	20 (6,2,5,5,2)	Bottom 7	"Caprichosa" – Chayanne
Facundo González	13 (4,2,2,3,2)	Bottom 7	"Bulería" – David Bisbal
Julieta Ponce	20 (5,3,5,5,2)	Safe	"Bulería" – David Bisbal
Magdalena Bravi	37 (7,9,9,8,4)	Safe	"Bulería" – David Bisbal
Martín Parra	15 (6,2,2,3,2)	Safe	"Bulería" – David Bisbal
Nicolás Ramírez	21 (9,4,9,9,7)	Safe	"Pégate" – Ricky Martin
Agustín Morgante	32 (8,7,6,8,3)	Safe	"Pégate" – Ricky Martin
Yanina Iglesias	25 (6,3,7,4,5)	Bottom 7	"Pégate" – Ricky Martin
Clara Douradinha	36 (8,8,9,8,3)	Safe	"Ay Mamá" – Chayanne
Soledad Cescato	29 (7,8,5,6,3)	Bottom 7	"Ay Mamá" – Chayanne
Mariano Rodríguez	31 (7,4,8,8,4)	Eliminated	"Ay Mamá" – Chayanne
Joaquín Starosta	16 (4,3,4,3,2)	Safe	"Ay Mamá" – Chayanne

- Highest Score: Nicolás Ramírez
- Bottom Seven: Ana Izaguirre, Augusto Buccafusco, Yanina Iglesias, Vanesa Simón, Facundo González, Federico Baldino & Mariano Rodríguez
- Eliminated: Mariano Rodríguez

=== Top 17 – Rock N'Roll ===
- Performances:

Dancers	Score	Result	Music	Choreographer
Martín Parra	19 (5,3,4,5,2)	Eliminated	"Proud Mary" – Tina Turner	Darío Dorzi
Julieta Ponce	26 (6,4,7,7,2)	Saved	"Proud Mary" – Tina Turner	Darío Dorzi
Augusto Buccafusco	26 (5,4,5,5,7)	Saved	"Proud Mary" – Tina Turner	Darío Dorzi
Mariano De la Canal	19 (5,6,3,2,3)	Bottom 2	"Proud Mary" – Tina Turner	Darío Dorzi
Nicolás Ramírez	44 (10,9,9,9,7)	Safe	"Hound Dog" – Elvis Presley	Hernán Alegre
Clara Douradinha	34 (7,7,7,8,5)	Safe	"Hound Dog" – Elvis Presley	Hernán Alegre
Agustín Morgante	29 (9,5,6,6,3)	Saved	"Hound Dog" – Elvis Presley	Hernán Alegre
Ana Izaguirre	31 (5,6,7,6,7)	Safe	"Jailhouse Rock" – Elvis Presley	Vanesa García Millán
Daniela Pantano	34 (7,10,5,7,5)	Safe	"Jailhouse Rock" – Elvis Presley	Vanesa García Millán
Leandro Martínez	33 (7,8,7,7,4)	Safe	"Jailhouse Rock" – Elvis Presley	Vanesa García Millán
Magdalena Bravi	41 (9,9,8,8,7)	Saved	"Footloose" – Kenny Loggins	Verónica Peccolo
Maribel Varela	24 (8,4,8,7,2)	Saved	"Footloose" – Kenny Loggins	Verónica Peccolo
Joaquín Starosta	34 (8,10,5,6,5)	Saved	"Footloose" – Kenny Loggins	Verónica Peccolo
Federico Baldino	26 (5,5,5,4,7)	Saved	"Footloose" – Kenny Loggins	Verónica Peccolo
Soledad Cescato	40 (7,10,9,8,6)	Saved	"Great Balls of Fire" – Jerry Lee Lewis	Carla Lanzi
Vanesa Simón	30 (4,6,5,6,9)	Disqualified	"Great Balls of Fire" – Jerry Lee Lewis	Carla Lanzi
Facundo González	19 (8,2,1,6,2)	Saved	"Great Balls of Fire" – Jerry Lee Lewis	Carla Lanzi

- Highest Score: Nicolás Ramírez
- Saved by the judges:Magdalena Bravi, Soledad Cescato, Agustín Morgante, Julieta Ponce, Joaquín Starosta, Maribel Varela, Augusto Buccafusco, Facundo González & Federico Baldino
- Bottom two: Mariano de la Canal & Martín Parra
- Eliminated: Martín Parra
- Disqualified by the public vote: Vanesa Simón

=== Top 16 – Lambada ===
- Performances:

Dancers	Score	Result	Music	Choreographer
Joaquín Starosta	20 (5,4,4,3,4)	Safe	"Dançando Lambada" – Kaoma	Carla Lanzi
Augusto Buccafusco	42 (9,9,9,8,7)	Safe	"Dançando Lambada" – Kaoma	Carla Lanzi
Clara Douradinha	39 (8,8,8,9,6)	Safe	"Dançando Lambada" – Kaoma	Carla Lanzi
Soledad Cescato	33 (7,6,8,7,5)	Safe	"Dançando Lambada" – Kaoma	Carla Lanzi
Facundo González	16 (5,3,1,4,3)	Eliminated	"Lambamor" – Kaoma	Darío Dorzi
Daniela Pantano	34 (9,7,6,7,5)	Saved	"Lambamor" – Kaoma	Darío Dorzi
Leandro Marínez	32 (7,6,7,8,4)	Safe	"Lambamor" – Kaoma	Darío Dorzi
Federico Baldino	17 (5,3,1,5,3)	Bottom 2	"Lambamor" – Kaoma	Darío Dorzi
Mariano De la Canal	24 (5,3,8,5,3)	Safe	"A Galera" – Ivete Sangalo	Hernán Alegre
Magdalena Bravi	38 (6,8,10,8,6)	Safe	"A Galera" – Ivete Sangalo	Hernán Alegre
Maribel Varela	40 (9,9,9,8,5)	Saved	"A Galera" – Ivete Sangalo	Hernán Alegre
Ana Izaguirre	35 (8,7,8,8,4)	Saved	"A Galera" – Ivete Sangalo	Hernán Alegre
Julieta Ponce	26 (6,5,6,6,3)	Saved	"Chorando se foi" – Kaoma	Vanesa García Millán
Julieta Gómez	10 (4,1,2,2,1)	Saved	"Chorando se foi" – Kaoma	Vanesa García Millán
Nicolás Ramírez	39 (10,10,7,7,5)	Safe	"Chorando se foi" – Kaoma	Vanesa García Millán
Agustín Morgante	31 (7,5,7,7,5)	Safe	"Chorando se foi" – Kaoma	Vanesa García Millán

- Highest Score: Augusto Buccafusco
- Saves by the judges: Maribel Varela, Ana Izaguirre, Daniela Pantano, Julieta Ponce & Julieta Gómez
- Bottom two: Federico Baldino & Facundo González
- Eliminated: Facundo González

=== Top 15 – Strip Dance ===
- Performances:

Dancers	Score	Result	Music	Choreographer
Ana Izaguirre	33 (6,9,8,6,4)	Safe	"Fighter" – Christina Aguilera	Carla Lanzi
Leandro Martínez	17 (4,1,5,4,3)	Quit	"Fighter" – Christina Aguilera	Carla Lanzi
Magdalena Bravi	37 (8,7,9,9,4)	Saved	"Fighter" – Christina Aguilera	Carla Lanzi
Federico Baldino	19 (8,2,2,5,2)	Saved	"Fighter" – Christina Aguilera	Carla Lanzi
Julieta Gómez	18 (1,1,5,5,6)	Saved	"Pink" – Aerosmith	Verónica Peccolo
Agustín Morgante	32 (8,4,8,7,5)	Safe	"Pink" – Aerosmith	Verónica Peccolo
Clara Douradinha	18 (3,2,3,5,5)	Saved	"Pink" – Aerosmith	Verónica Peccolo
Nicolás Ramírez	34 (6,10,6,7,5)	Safe	"Pink" – Aerosmith	Verónica Peccolo
Mariano De la Canal	39 (8,8,9,7,7)	Safe	"Black Velvet" – Alannah Myles	Vanesa García Millán
Soledad Cescato	44 (10,9,8,10,7)	Safe	"Black Velvet" – Alannah Myles	Vanesa García Millán
Daniela Pantano	31 (5,6,8,7,5)	Eliminated	"Black Velvet" – Alannah Myles	Vanesa García Millán
Joaquín Starosta	15 (3,3,4,3,2)	Bottom 2	"I Love Rock 'n' Roll" – Britney Spears	Darío Dorzi
Augusto Buccafusco	23 (5,3,6,4,5)	Safe	"I Love Rock 'n' Roll" – Britney Spears	Darío Dorzi
Julieta Ponce	20 (4,3,5,4,4)	Safe	"I Love Rock 'n' Roll" – Britney Spears	Darío Dorzi
Maribel Varela	25 (5,6,5,6,3)	Saved	"I Love Rock 'n' Roll" – Britney Spears	Darío Dorzi

- Highest Score: Soledad Cescato
- Saved by the judges: Magdalena Bravi, Clara Douradinha, Maribel Varela, Julieta Gómez & Federico Baldino
- Bottom two: Joaquín Starosta & Daniela Pantano
- Eliminated: Daniela Pantano
- Quit: Leandro Martínez

=== A second chance – Cumbia & Cuarteto ===
The eliminated contestants (except for Salomé Calamonici and Daniela Pantano) came back for a second chance, but only two of them got the opportunity to return into the competition. This time, the judges did not score the couples, but they picked four contestants. The choreographers picked another one, and the contestants still in the competition picked another one too. The six pre-selected contestants were sent to the public vote, and finally, three of them were picked to return into the competition.

- Performances:

Dancers	Result	Music	Choreographer
Vanesa Simón	Eliminated	"Luna Luna" – Ráfaga	Lorena Portillo
Julieta Carbonell	Eliminated	"Luna Luna" – Ráfaga	Lorena Portillo
Facundo González	Returning contestant	"Luna Luna" – Ráfaga	Lorena Portillo
Martín Parra	Eliminated	"Luna Luna" – Ráfaga	Lorena Portillo
Gabriela Flores	Eliminated	"Luna Luna" – Ráfaga	Lorena Portillo
Rubén Silva	Returning contestant	"Luna Luna" – Ráfaga	Lorena Portillo
Mariano Rodríguez	Eliminated	"Soy cordobés" – Rodrigo Bueno	Rodrigo Cristofaro
Carolina Puntonet	Eliminated	"Soy cordobés" – Rodrigo Bueno	Rodrigo Cristofaro
Emanuel Alegre	Eliminated	"Soy cordobés" – Rodrigo Bueno	Rodrigo Cristofaro
Yanina Iglesias	Returning contestant	"Soy cordobés" – Rodrigo Bueno	Rodrigo Cristofaro

- Automatically eliminated: Vanesa Simón, Julieta Carbonell, Martín Parra & Gabriel Flores
- Picked by the judges: Rubén Silva, Mariano Rodríguez, Carolina Puntonet & Yanina Iglesias.
- Picked by the judges: Emanuel Alegre.
- Picked by the contestants in competition: Facundo González.
- Returning contestants picked by the public vote: Yanina Iglesias, Rubén Silva & Facundo González.

=== Top 17 – Adagio from telenovelas ===
- Performances:

Dancers	Score	Result	Music	Choreographer
Clara Douradinha	27 (7,4,4,7,5)	Saved	"Herederos" – David Bisbal	Hernán Alegre
Federico Baldino	28 (5,6,6,6,5)	Safe	"Herederos" – David Bisbal	Hernán Alegre
Julieta Gómez	20 (4,2,7,6,1)	Eliminated	"Herederos" – David Bisbal	Hernán Alegre
Joaquín Starosta	7 (3,1,1,1,1)	Saved	"Herederos" – David Bisbal	Hernán Alegre
Soledad Cescato	34 (6,6,10,6,6)	Safe	"Tan Sólo Tú" – Franco De Vita feat. Alejandra Guzmán	Darío Dorzi
Agustín Morgante	44 (10,9,9,9,7)	Safe	"Tan Sólo Tú" – Franco De Vita feat. Alejandra Guzmán	Darío Dorzi
Franco Ibáñez	20 (4,3,5,5,3)	Bottom 2	"Tan Sólo Tú" – Franco De Vita feat. Alejandra Guzmán	Darío Dorzi
Magdalena Bravi	45 (8,10,8,10,9)	Safe	"Tan Sólo Tú" – Franco De Vita feat. Alejandra Guzmán	Darío Dorzi
Rubén Silva	35 (6,8,8,8,5)	Safe	"Dame la llave de tu corazón" – Cristian Castro	Vanesa García Millán
Yanina Iglesias	20 (4,3,5,6,2)	Saved	"Dame la llave de tu corazón" – Cristian Castro	Vanesa García Millán
Facundo González	34 (10,6,7,6,5)	Safe	"Dame la llave de tu corazón" – Cristian Castro	Vanesa García Millán
Maribel Varela	29 (7,4,7,7,4)	Safe	"Prohibido nuestro amor" – Paz Martínez	Verónica Peccolo
Augusto Buccafusco	37 (7,8,8,8,6)	Saved	"Prohibido nuestro amor" – Paz Martínez	Verónica Peccolo
Nicolás Ramírez	33 (7,8,7,6,5)	Safe	"Prohibido nuestro amor" – Paz Martínez	Verónica Peccolo
Mariano De la Canal	29 (7,4,7,7,4)	Saved	"Volver" – Ricardo Montaner	Carla Lanzi
Ana Izaguirre	37 (7,8,8,8,6)	Saved	"Volver" – Ricardo Montaner	Carla Lanzi
Julieta Ponce	33 (7,4,8,7,7)	Saved	"Volver" – Ricardo Montaner	Carla Lanzi

- Highest Score: Magdalena Bravi
- Saved by the judges: Augusto Buccafusco, Clara Douradinha, Ana Izaguirre, Mariano de la Canal, Yanina Iglesias, Julieta Ponce, Joaquín Starosta
- Bottom two: Franco Ibáñez & Julieta Gómez
- Eliminated: Julieta Gómez

=== Top 16 – Cha cha cha ===
- Performances:

Dancers	Score	Result	Music	Choreographer
Facundo González	26 (6,6,5,5,4)	Safe	"Let's Get Loud" – Jennifer Lopez	Hernán Alegre
Nicolás Ramírez	37 (7,7,9,7,7)	Safe	"Let's Get Loud" – Jennifer Lopez	Hernán Alegre
Agustín Morgante	37 (7,10,8,7,5)	Bottom 4	"Let's Get Loud" – Jennifer Lopez	Hernán Alegre
Soledad Cescato	Not scored	Eliminated	"Let's Get Loud" – Jennifer Lopez	Hernán Alegre
Magdalena Bravi	38 (8,6,10,7,7)	Safe	"Echa Pa' Lante" – Thalía	Carla Lanzi
Franco Ibáñez	28 (5,4,7,7,5)	Safe	"Echa Pa' Lante" – Thalía	Carla Lanzi
Joaquín Starosta	19 (5,4,2,5,3)	Safe	"Echa Pa' Lante" – Thalía	Carla Lanzi
Maribel Varela	37 (8,4,9,10,6)	Saved	"Echa Pa' Lante" – Thalía	Carla Lanzi
Mariano De la Canal	21 (5,2,5,4,5)	Saved	"Falsas esperanzas" – Christina Aguilera	Darío Dorzi
Clara Douradinha	25 (7,3,5,6,4)	Saved	"Falsas esperanzas" – Christina Aguilera	Darío Dorzi
Rubén Silva	36 (8,7,8,8,5)	Bottom 4	"Falsas esperanzas" – Christina Aguilera	Darío Dorzi
Yanina Iglesias	Not scored	Bottom 4	"Falsas esperanzas" – Christina Aguilera	Darío Dorzi
Federico Baldino	30 (8,6,4,6,6)	Safe	"I Need to Know" – Marc Anthony	Verónica Peccolo
Julieta Ponce	40 (9,9,9,8,5)	Safe	"I Need to Know" – Marc Anthony	Verónica Peccolo
Augusto Buccafusco	31 (8,9,4,6,4)	Safe	"I Need to Know" – Marc Anthony	Verónica Peccolo
Ana Izaguirre	21 (5,3,5,5,3)	Saved	"I Need to Know" – Marc Anthony	Verónica Peccolo

The production decided that Soledad and Yanina were not going to dance, because they broke the rules. Instead of dancing, they were both sent to the public vote.

- Highest Score: Julieta Ponce
- Saved by the judges: Maribel Varela, Ana Izaguirre, Clara Douradinha & Mariano de la Canal
- Bottom four: Rubén Silva, Agustín Morgante, Yanina Iglesias & Soledad Cescato
- Eliminated: Soledad Cescato

=== Top 15 – Arabic music ===
- Performances:

Dancers	Score	Result	Music	Choreographer
Franco Ibáñez	20 (4,4,4,3,5)	Saved	"Şımarık" – Tarkan	Vanesa García Millán
Facundo González	30 (7,6,6,7,4)	Safe	"Şımarık" – Tarkan	Vanesa García Millán
Joaquín Starosta	27 (9,5,5,6,2)	Saved	"Şımarık" – Tarkan	Vanesa García Millán
Agustín Morgante	48 (10,10,9,10,9)	Safe	"Şımarık" – Tarkan	Vanesa García Millán
Magdalena Bravi	50 (10,10,10,10,10)	Safe	"Habibi Ya Nour El Ain" – Amr Diab	Verónica Peccolo
Maribel Varela	34 (8,5,7,8,6)	Safe	"Habibi Ya Nour El Ain" – Amr Diab	Verónica Peccolo
Julieta Ponce	34 (6,7,8,8,5)	Safe	"Habibi Ya Nour El Ain" – Amr Diab	Verónica Peccolo
Rubén Silva	33 (8,6,6,8,5)	Eliminated	"Allah Aleik Ya Sidi" – Ehab Tawfik	Hernán Alegre
Mariano De la Canal	36 (8,10,8,7,3)	Safe	"Allah Aleik Ya Sidi" – Ehab Tawfik	Hernán Alegre
Federico Baldino	35 (8,4,8,8,7)	Saved	"Allah Aleik Ya Sidi" – Ehab Tawfik	Hernán Alegre
Augusto Buccafusco	45 (10,10,8,8,9)	Safe	"Allah Aleik Ya Sidi" – Ehab Tawfik	Hernán Alegre
Ana Izaguirre	19 (5,2,7,3,2)	Bottom 2	"Ah Ya Alby" – Hakim	Carla Lanzi
Nicolás Ramírez	33 (7,7,7,7,5)	Saved	"Ah Ya Alby" – Hakim	Carla Lanzi
Clara Douradinha	33 (7,7,8,7,4)	Safe	"Ah Ya Alby" – Hakim	Carla Lanzi
Yanina Iglesias	40 (9,8,9,8,6)	Safe	"Ah Ya Alby" – Hakim	Carla Lanzi

- Highest Score: Magdalena Bravi
- Saved by the judges: Nicolás Ramírez, Federico Baldino, Joaquín Starosta & Franco Ibáñez
- Bottom two: Ana Izaguirre & Rubén Silva
- Eliminated: Rubén Silva

=== Top 14 – Pole dance ===
- Performances:

Dancers	Score	Result	Music	Choreographer
Joaquín Starosta	42 (10,10,8,8,6)	Saved	"New Sensation" – INXS	Verónica Peccolo
Agustín Morgante	30 (8,5,5,8,4)	Bottom 2	"New Sensation" – INXS	Verónica Peccolo
Clara Douradinha	23 (6,4,4,6,3)	Eliminated	"New Sensation" – INXS	Verónica Peccolo
Julieta Ponce	28 (5,4,7,7,5)	Safe	"New Sensation" – INXS	Verónica Peccolo
Facundo González	33 (7,6,7,7,6)	Safe	"Unskinny Bop" – Poison	Darío Dorzi
Yanina Iglesias	45 (10,10,9,8,8)	Safe	"Unskinny Bop" – Poison	Darío Dorzi
Augusto Buccafusco	45 (10,10,9,8,8)	Safe	"Unskinny Bop" – Poison	Darío Dorzi
Ana Izaguirre	27 (8,4,6,6,4)	Safe	"Back in Black" – AC/DC	Hernán Alegre
Franco Ibáñez	19 (5,2,3,4,5)	Saved	"Back in Black" – AC/DC	Hernán Alegre
Federico Baldino	13 (3,1,2,5,2)	Saved	"Back in Black" – AC/DC	Hernán Alegre
Magdalena Bravi	50 (10,10,10,10,10)	Safe	"Come Together" – Kris Allen	Vanesa García Millán
Maribel Varela	33 (7,7,8,7,4)	Safe	"Come Together" – Kris Allen	Vanesa García Millán
Mariano De la Canal	18 (5,3,4,5,1)	Saved	"Come Together" – Kris Allen	Vanesa García Millán
Nicolás Ramírez	43 (9,10,9,8,7)	Safe	"Come Together" – Kris Allen	Vanesa García Millán

- Highest Score: Magdalena Bravi
- Saved by the judges: Joaquín Starosta, Franco Ibáñez, Mariano de la Canal & Federico Baldino
- Bottom two: Agustín Morgante & Clara Douradinha
- Eliminated: Clara Douradinha

=== Top 13 – Hip-hop ===
- Performances:

Dancers	Score	Result	Music	Choreographer
Agustín Morgante	44 (8,10,10,8,8)	Safe	"Womanizer" – Britney Spears	Carla Lanzi
Julieta Ponce	31 (9,6,6,6,4)	Saved	"Womanizer" – Britney Spears	Carla Lanzi
Augusto Buccafusco	45 (10,10,9,8,8)	Safe	"Womanizer" – Britney Spears	Carla Lanzi
Facundo González	30 (7,5,6,7,5)	Saved	"Boom Boom Pow" – The Black Eyed Peas	Hernán Alegre
Maribel Varela	40 (7,7,9,9,8)	Bottom 5	"Boom Boom Pow" – The Black Eyed Peas	Hernán Alegre
Yanina Iglesias	42 (9,9,8,8,8)	Safe	"Boom Boom Pow" – The Black Eyed Peas	Hernán Alegre
Nicolás Ramírez	Not scored	Eliminated	"Boom Boom Pow" – The Black Eyed Peas	Hernán Alegre
Joaquín Starosta	26 (7,3,4,4,8)	Bottom 5	"Telephone" – Lady Gaga feat. Beyoncé	Vanesa García Millán
Ana Izaguirre	5 (1,1,1,1,1)	Bottom 5	"Telephone" – Lady Gaga feat. Beyoncé	Vanesa García Millán
Federico Baldino	42 (9,10,6,9,8)	Saved	"Telephone" – Lady Gaga feat. Beyoncé	Vanesa García Millán
Magdalena Bravi	31 (6,4,9,7,5)	Safe	"Not Myself Tonight" – Christina Aguilera	Darío Dorzi
Franco Ibáñez	24 (4,5,7,6,2)	Bottom 5	"Not Myself Tonight" – Christina Aguilera	Darío Dorzi
Mariano De la Canal	11 (3,2,4,1,1)	Saved	"Not Myself Tonight" – Christina Aguilera	Darío Dorzi

The production decided that Nicolás was not going to dance, because they broke the rules. Instead of dancing, he was sent to the public vote.

- Highest Score: Augusto Buccafusco
- Saved by the judges: Facundo González, Federico Baldino, Julieta Ponce & Mariano de la Canal
- Bottom five: Ana Izaguirre, Maribel Varela, Joaquín Starosta, Franco Ibáñez & Nicolás Ramírez
- Eliminated: Nicolás Ramírez

=== Top 12 – Electro dance ===
This week, Reina Reech was replaced in the panel of judges by the winner of the first season, Eugenia Lemos, who scored the couples.

- Performances:

Dancers	Score	Result	Music	Choreographer
Ana Izaguirre	18 (4,3,4,5,2)	Saved	"I Gotta Feeling" – The Black Eyed Peas	Darío Dorzi
Yanina Iglesias	46 (8,10,9,10,9)	Safe	"I Gotta Feeling" – The Black Eyed Peas	Darío Dorzi
Augusto Buccafusco	43 (9,10,9,10,5)	Safe	"I Gotta Feeling" – The Black Eyed Peas	Darío Dorzi
Federico Baldino	16 (3,1,1,8,3)	Bottom 4	"When Love Takes Over"; David Guetta feat. Kelly Rowland	Hernán Alegre
Agustín Morgante	39 (7,10,10,5,7)	Eliminated	"When Love Takes Over"; David Guetta feat. Kelly Rowland	Hernán Alegre
Magdalena Bravi	33 (8,5,10,5,5)	Saved	"When Love Takes Over"; David Guetta feat. Kelly Rowland	Hernán Alegre
Julieta Ponce	29 (5,3,8,8,5)	Bottom 4	"Club Can't Handle Me"; David Guetta feat. Flo Rida	Vanesa García Millán
Facundo González	42 (8,8,9,9,8)	Safe	"Club Can't Handle Me"; David Guetta feat. Flo Rida	Vanesa García Millán
Mariano De la Canal	39 (8,7,8,10,6)	Safe	"Club Can't Handle Me"; David Guetta feat. Flo Rida	Vanesa García Millán
Franco Ibáñez	27 (4,1,4,10,8)	Bottom 4	"Born This Way" – Lady Gaga	Carla Lanzi
Joaquín Starosta	32 (5,6,6,9,6)	Saved	"Born This Way" – Lady Gaga	Carla Lanzi
Maribel Varela	27 (4,6,9,3,5)	Saved	"Born This Way" – Lady Gaga	Carla Lanzi

- Highest Score: Yanina Iglesias
- Saved by the judges: Magdalena Bravi, Joaquín Starosta, Maribel Varela & Ana Izaguirre
- Bottom four: Federico Baldino, Franco Ibáñez, Julieta Ponce & Agustín Morgante
- Eliminated: Agustín Morgante

=== Top 11 – Country ===
- Performances:

Dancers	Score	Result	Music	Choreographer
Federico Baldino	36 (8,8,6,8,6)	Safe	"Walk of Life" – Dire Straits	Hernán Alegre
Joaquín Starosta	27 (6,5,6,5,5)	Bottom 2	"Walk of Life" – Dire Straits	Hernán Alegre
Julieta Ponce	29 (7,4,6,8,4)	Safe	"Walk of Life" – Dire Straits	Hernán Alegre
Ana Izaguirre	23 (5,3,5,5,5)	Saved	"Walk of Life" – Dire Straits	Hernán Alegre
Facundo González	24 (5,3,6,6,4)	Saved	"Blue Moon Nights" – John Fogerty	Vanesa García Millán
Mariano De la Canal	31 (6,4,9,7,5)	Safe	"Blue Moon Nights" – John Fogerty	Vanesa García Millán
Maribel Varela	26 (6,6,6,5,3)	Saved	"Blue Moon Nights" – John Fogerty	Vanesa García Millán
Magdalena Bravi	31 (5,3,10,7,6)	Safe	"Bad Moon Rising" – Sonic Youth	Darío Dorzi
Franco Ibáñez	10 (1,1,3,3,2)	Eliminated	"Bad Moon Rising" – Sonic Youth	Darío Dorzi
Yanina Iglesias	27 (8,4,5,6,4)	Saved	"Bad Moon Rising" – Sonic Youth	Darío Dorzi
Augusto Buccafusco	32 (7,3,8,7,7)	Safe	"Bad Moon Rising" – Sonic Youth	Darío Dorzi

- Highest Score: Federico Baldino
- Saved by the judges: Facundo González, Maribel Varela, Ana Izaguirre & Yanina Iglesias
- Bottom two: Joaquín Starosta & Franco Ibáñez
- Eliminated: Franco Ibáñez

=== Top 10 – Reggaeton II ===
Since this week, the duels won't be part of the show anymore, so the contestants with the lowest scores, lowest performance in camp activities and the contestant with the most negative votes, will be up for elimination.

- Performances:

Dancers	Score	Result	Music	Choreographer
Mariano De la Canal	17 (4,3,5,3,2)	Bottom 5	"Nadie lo Sabrá" – Croni-K	Vanesa García Millán
Maribel Varela	30 (4,5,9,7,5)	Eliminated	"Nadie lo Sabrá" – Croni-K	Vanesa García Millán
Facundo González	39 (8,8,9,7,7)	Safe	"Nadie lo Sabrá" – Croni-K	Vanesa García Millán
Augusto Buccafusco	27 (4,4,6,7,6)	Safe	"Abusadora" – Wisin & Yandel	Darío Dorzi
Magdalena Bravi	39 (7,6,8,10,8)	Safe	"Abusadora" – Wisin & Yandel	Darío Dorzi
Yanina Iglesias	29 (7,5,6,7,4)	Bottom 5	"Abusadora" – Wisin & Yandel	Darío Dorzi
Julieta Ponce	40 (8,9,8,8,7)	Safe	"El Ritmo No Perdona" – Daddy Yankee	Hernán Alegre
Ana Izaguirre	33 (9,5,5,8,6)	Bottom 5	"El Ritmo No Perdona" – Daddy Yankee	Hernán Alegre
Joaquín Starosta	18 (4,3,5,3,3)	Bottom 5	"El Ritmo No Perdona" – Daddy Yankee	Hernán Alegre
Federico Baldino	26 (7,4,4,7,4)	Safe	"El Ritmo No Perdona" – Daddy Yankee	Hernán Alegre

- Highest Score: Julieta Ponce
- Bottom five: Yanina Iglesias, Joaquín Starosta, Mariano De la Canal, Ana Izaguirre & Maribel Varela
- Eliminated: Maribel Varela

=== Top 9 – Latin Adagio ===
- Performances:

Dancers	Score	Result	Music	Choreographer
Magdalena Bravi	47 (9,9,10,10,9)	Safe	"Tal Vez" – Ricky Martin	Darío Dorzi
Yanina Iglesias	29 (5,7,6,6,5)	Safe	"Tal Vez" – Ricky Martin	Darío Dorzi
Augusto Buccafusco	30 (5,9,6,5,5)	Bottom 4	"Tal Vez" – Ricky Martin	Darío Dorzi
Julieta Ponce	27 (4,4,8,5,6)	Eliminated	"Me va a extrañar" – Ricardo Montaner	Hernán Alegre
Joaquín Starosta	21 (5,3,5,3,5)	Bottom 4	"Me va a extrañar" – Ricardo Montaner	Hernán Alegre
Federico Baldino	30 (6,8,4,7,5)	Bottom 4	"Me va a extrañar" – Ricardo Montaner	Hernán Alegre
Ana Izaguirre	28 (6,5,7,5,5)	Safe	"Me va a extrañar" – Ricardo Montaner	Hernán Alegre
Mariano De la Canal	33 (8,3,8,6,8)	Safe	"Tan Enamorados" – Ricardo Montaner	Vanesa García Millán
Facundo González	32 (8,3,8,7,6)	Safe	"Tan Enamorados" – Ricardo Montaner	Vanesa García Millán

- Highest Score: Magdalena Bravi
- Bottom four: Augusto Buccafusco, Joaquín Starosta, Federico Baldino & Julieta Ponce
- Eliminated: Julieta Ponce

=== Top 8 – Strip Dance II ===
This round, Marcelo Polino was replaced in the panel of judges by the winner of the first season, Eugenia Lemos, who scored the couples.

- Performances:

Dancers	Score	Result	Music	Choreographer
Federico Baldino	18 (5,2,3,1,7)	Bottom 6	"Fighter" – Christina Aguilera	Hernán Alegre
Magdalena Bravi	40 (7,10,9,10,4)	Bottom 6	"Fighter" – Christina Aguilera	Hernán Alegre
Ana Izaguirre	24 (3,2,4,6,9)	Eliminated	"Fighter" – Christina Aguilera	Hernán Alegre
Mariano De la Canal	39 (8,6,9,6,10)	Safe	"Black Velvet" – Alannah Myles	Vanesa García Millán
Yanina Iglesias	38 (7,6,8,8,9)	Bottom 6	"Black Velvet" – Alannah Myles	Vanesa García Millán
Augusto Buccafusco	32 (6,6,8,6,6)	Bottom 6	"I Love Rock 'n' Roll" – Britney Spears	Darío Dorzi
Joaquín Starosta	19 (4,3,5,3,4)	Bottom 6	"I Love Rock 'n' Roll" – Britney Spears	Darío Dorzi
Facundo González	21 (6,3,5,5,2)	Safe	"I Love Rock 'n' Roll" – Britney Spears	Darío Dorzi

- Highest Score: Magdalena Bravi
- Bottom six: Federico Baldino, Magdalena Bravi, Joaquín Starosta, Augusto Buccafusco, Yanina Iglesias & Ana Izaguirre
- Eliminated: Ana Izaguirre

=== Top 7 – Music videos ===
This round, Marcelo Polino was replaced in the panel of judges by the winner of the first season, Eugenia Lemos, who scored the couples.

- Performances:

Dancers	Score	Result	Music	Choreographer
Yanina Iglesias	28 (7,5,8,4,4)	Eliminated	"Judas" – Lady Gaga	Vanesa García Millán
Federico Baldino	40 (8,6,6,10,10)	Bottom 4	"Judas" – Lady Gaga	Vanesa García Millán
Magdalena Bravi	50 (10,10,10,10,10)	Safe	"Judas" – Lady Gaga	Vanesa García Millán
Facundo González	37 (7,4,9,9,8)	Safe	"Till the World Ends" – Britney Spears	Darío Dorzi
Joaquín Starosta	27 (6,5,7,6,3)	Bottom 4	"Pump It" – The Black Eyed Peas	Hernán Alegre
Mariano De la Canal	36 (8,3,10,7,10)	Safe	"Pump It" – The Black Eyed Peas	Hernán Alegre
Augusto Buccafusco	48 (10,10,9,10,9)	Bottom 4	"Pump It" – The Black Eyed Peas	Hernán Alegre

- Highest Score: Magdalena Bravi
- Bottom four: Joaquín Starosta, Augusto Buccafusco, Federico Baldino & Yanina Iglesias
- Eliminated: Yanina Iglesias

=== Top 6 – Pole dance II ===
- Performances:

Dancers	Score	Result	Music	Choreographer
Magdalena Bravi	46 (9,8,10,10,9)	Safe	"Come Together" – Kris Allen	Vanesa García Millán
Mariano De la Canal	20 (4,2,9,3,2)	Bottom 5	"Come Together" – Kris Allen	Vanesa García Millán
Joaquín Starosta	43 (10,10,8,8,7)	Bottom 5	"New Sensation" – INXS	Verónica Peccolo
Federico Baldino	28 (7,8,5,5,3)	Bottom 5	"Back in Black" – AC/DC	Hernán Alegre
Facundo González	>40 (9,10,9,8,4)	Eliminated	"Unskinny Bop" – Poison	Darío Dorzi
Augusto Buccafusco	44 (9,10,10,8,7)	Bottom 5	"Unskinny Bop" – Poison	Darío Dorzi

- Highest Score: Magdalena Bravi
- Bottom Five: Mariano De la Canal, Joaquín Starosta, Augusto Buccafusco, Federico Baldino & Facundo González
- Eliminated: Facundo González

=== Top 5 – Cuarteto II ===
- Performances:

Dancers	Score	Result	Music
Federico Baldino	30 (5,4,6,7,8)	Bottom 3	"Cómo Olvidarla" – Rodrigo
Joaquín Starosta	15 (3,2,4,3,3)	Eliminated	"Por Lo Que Yo Te Quiero" – Walter Olmos
Mariano De la Canal	41 (7,10,9,8,7)	Bottom 3	"Quiéreme" – Jean Carlos
Magdalena Bravi	42 (6,6,10,10,10)	Safe	"Soy Cordobés" – Rodrigo
Augusto Buccafusco	37 (7,5,9,8,8)	Safe	"Soy Cordobés" – Rodrigo

- Highest Score: Magdalena Bravi
- Bottom Three: Mariano De la Canal, Federico Baldino & Joaquín Starosta
- Eliminated: Joaquín Starosta

=== Top 4 ===
==== Semifinal 1 ====
The first semifinal introduced Augusto Buccafusco against Mariano De la Canal. They both danced three different styles, and the judges chose the best of every style, giving the winner of each style, 1 point. Then, the public gave 3 points to their favorite. The contestant with the most votes, went through the final, and the other, was eliminated.

- Performances:

Dancers	Style	Music	Best Chosen by the Judges	Result
Augusto Buccafusco	Axé	"Dança do Vampiro" – Asa de Águia	Mariano De la Canal	Eliminated
Mariano De la Canal	Axé	"Reboleia" – Axé Bahia	Mariano De la Canal	Finalist
Augusto Buccafusco	Hip-hop	"Womanizer" – Britney Spears	Augusto Buccafusco	Eliminated
Mariano De la Canal	Hip-hop	"Not Myself Tonight" – Christina Aguilera	Augusto Buccafusco	Finalist
Augusto Buccafusco	Latin Adagio	"Tal Vez" – Ricky Martin	Mariano De la Canal	Eliminated
Mariano De la Canal	Latin Adagio	"Tan Enamorados" – Ricardo Montaner	Mariano De la Canal	Finalist

- Chosen by the Judges: Mariano De la Canal
- Chosen by the Public Vote: Mariano De la Canal
- Eliminated as a Semifinalist: Augusto Buccafusco
- Finalist: Mariano De la Canal

==== Semifinal 2 ====
The second semifinal introduced Federico Baldino against Magdalena Bravi. They both danced three different styles, and the judges chose the best of every style, giving the winner of each style, 1 point. Then, the public gave 3 points to their favorite. The contestant with the most votes, went through the final, and the other, was eliminated.

- Performances:

Dancers	Style	Music	Best Chosen by the Judges	Result
Federico Baldino	Country	"Walk of Life" – Dire Straits	Federico Baldino	Eliminated
Magdalena Bravi	Country	"Bad Moon Rising" – Sonic Youth	Federico Baldino	Finalist
Federico Baldino	Cumbia	"Agüita" – Ráfaga	Magdalena Bravi	Eliminated
Magdalena Bravi	Cumbia	"Nunca me Faltes" – Antonio Ríos	Magdalena Bravi	Finalist
Federico Baldino	Music videos	"Judas" – Lady Gaga	Magdalena Bravi	Eliminated
Magdalena Bravi	Music videos	"Judas" – Lady Gaga	Magdalena Bravi	Finalist

- Chosen by the Judges: Magdalena Bravi
- Chosen by the Public Vote: Magdalena Bravi
- Eliminated: Federico Baldino
- Finalist: Magdalena Bravi

=== Top 2 ===
==== Final ====
The final introduced Mariano De la Canal against Magdalena Bravi. They both danced four different styles, and the judges chose the best of every style, giving the winner of each style, 1 point. Then, the public gave 3 points to their favorite. The contestant with the most votes, was the winner.

- Performances:

Dancers	Style	Music	Best Chosen by the Judges	Result
Mariano De la Canal	Disco	"Last Dance" – Donna Summer	Magdalena Bravi	Runner-Up
Magdalena Bravi	Disco	"Sexual Revolution" – Macy Gray	Magdalena Bravi	Winner
Mariano De la Canal	Rock N'Roll	"Proud Mary" – Tina Turner	Mariano De la Canal	Runner-Up
Magdalena Bravi	Rock N'Roll	"Footloose" – Kenny Loggins	Mariano De la Canal	Winner
Mariano De la Canal	Adagio from telenovelas	"Volver" – Ricardo Montaner	Magdalena Bravi	Runner-Up
Magdalena Bravi	Adagio from telenovelas	"Tan Sólo Tú" – Franco De Vita feat. Alejandra Guzmán	Magdalena Bravi	Winner
Mariano De la Canal	Electro dance	"Club Can't Handle Me"; David Guetta feat. Flo Rida	Magdalena Bravi	Runner-Up
Magdalena Bravi	Electro dance	"When Love Takes Over"; David Guetta feat. Kelly Rowland	Magdalena Bravi	Winner

- Chosen by the Judges: Magdalena Bravi
- Chosen by the Public Vote: Magdalena Bravi
- Runner-Up: Mariano De la Canal
- Winner: Magdalena Bravi

== Elimination chart ==
Females	Males	Top 28	Top 24	Semifinalist	Runner-Up	Winner

Not in Competition	Safe	Highest Score	Saved by the public	Saved by the jury	Eliminated	Disqualified	Quit

Stage:		S-Finals	Finals																										
Week:		12/3^{1}	12/10	12/17	12/26	1/2	1/9	1/16	1/23	1/31	2/7	2/13	2/20	2/26	3/5	3/12	3/19	3/25	4/1	4/7	4/8	4/14	4/15	4/21	4/22	4/28	4/29	5/6	
Place	Contestant	Scores and Results																											
1	Magdalena	Top 24	34	38	35	31	31	44	37	41	38	37	45	38	50	50	31	33	31	39	47	40^{4}	50	46	42	-^{5}	5	7	Winner
2	Mariano D	Top 24	23	23	24	21	31	30	20	19	24	39	22	21	36	18	11	39	31	17	33	39	36	20	41	5	-^{6}	1	Runner-Up
3–4	Federico	Top 24	13	26	30	19	20	20	33	26	17	19	28	30	35	13	42	16	36	26	30	18	40	28	30	-^{5}	1		
3–4	Augusto	Top 24	27	38	27	31	21	28	29	26	42	23	37	31	45	45	45	43	32	27	30	32	48	44	37	1			
5	Joaquín	Top 24	16	35	25	20	17	24	16	34	20	15	7	19	27	42	26	32	27	18	21	19	27	43	15				
6	Facundo	Top 24	20	5	25	22	21	30	13	19	16		34	26	30	33	30	42	24	39	32	21	37	40					
7	Yanina	Top 24	30	28	33	43	39	23	35^{2}				20	-^{3}	40	45	42	46	27	29	29	38	28						
8	Ana	Top 24	28	30	30	26	30	27	23	31	35	33	20	21	19	28	5	18	23	33	28	24							
9	Julieta P	Top 24	21	16	27	26	24	33	20	26	26	20	33	40	34	28	31	29	29	40	27								
10	Maribel	Top 24	38	39	38	33	28	38	24	29	40	25	29	37	34	33	40	27	26	30									
11	Franco												20	28	20	19	24	27	10										
12	Agustín	Top 24	33	38	27	32	28	32	32	29	31	32	44	37	48	30	44	39											
13	Nicolás	Top 24	40	27	26	24	44	25	38	44	39	35	33	37	33	43	-^{3}												
14	Clara	Top 24	30	33	24	28	39	19	36	34	39	18	27	25	33	23													
15	Rubén	Top 24	42	37	29	21	34						36	36	35														
16	Soledad	Top 24	34	32	40	35	33	28	29	40	33	44	34	-^{3}															
17	Julieta G										10	18	20																
18	Daniela									34	34	31																	
19	Leandro	Top 24	31	30	14	25	25	18	34	33	32	17																	
20	Martín	Top 24	29	31	27	28	20	27	15	19																			
21	Vanesa	Top 24	19	33	25	22	19	18	20	30^{2}																			
22	Mariano R	Top 24	27	34	28	34	27	34	31																				
23	Carolina	Top 24	17	33	17	36	24	17																					
24	Julieta C	Top 24	30	35	18	18																							
25	Emanuel	Top 24	40	44	32																								
26	Gabriela	Top 24	23	31																									
27	Salomé	Top 24	13																										
31–28	Daniela	Elim																											
31–28	Florencia	Elim																											
31–28	Nahuel	Elim																											
31–28	Walter	Elim																											

^Note 1This was the week where contestants were introduced to the public. Four of them were eliminated, and the rest were the finalists.
^Note 2Yanina was disqualified after the January 23rd show for breaking the rules. Nicolás, Julieta P. and Vanesa broke the rules as well, but they were sent to the public vote. Finally, the audience decided Vanesa had to be disqualified.
^Note 3The production decided that Soledad and Yanina were not going to dance, because they broke the rules. Instead of dancing, they were both sent to the public both. Also Nicolás received the same restriction some weeks later.
^Note 4Magdalena had the highest score this round, but she was sent to the public vote by the negative votes, being saved.
^Note 5Federico and Magdalena did not performance this date as they were part of the second semi-finale.
^Note 6Mariano D. did not performance this date as he was declared a finalist the night before.

== Highest and lowest scoring performances ==
The best and worst performances in each dance according to the judges' marks are as follows:

Dance	Best dancer(s)	Best score	Worst dancer(s)	Worst score
Reggaeton I	Rubén Silva	42	Federico Baldino; Salomé Calamonici	13
Disco	Emanuel Alegre	44	Facundo González	5
Cumbia	Soledad Cescato	40	Leandro Martínez	14
Cuarteto I	Yanina Iglesias	43	Julieta Carbonell	18
Axé I	Nicolás Ramírez	44	Joaquín Starosta	17
Adagio	Magdalena Bravi	44	Carolina Puntonet	17
Latin pop	Nicolás Ramírez	38	Facundo González	13
Rock N'Roll	Nicolás Ramírez	44	Facundo González; Mariano De la Canal; Martín Parra	19
Lambada	Augusto Buccafusco	42	Julieta Gómez	10
Strip Dance I	Soledad Cescato	44	Joaquín Starosta	15
Adagio from Telenovelas	Magdalena Bravi	45	Joaquín Starosta	7
Cha cha cha	Julieta Ponce	40	Joaquín Starosta	19
Arabic music	Magdalena Bravi	50	Ana Izaguirre	19
Pole dance I	Magdalena Bravi	50	Federico Baldino	13
Hip-hop	Augusto Buccafusco	45	Ana Izaguirre	5
Electro dance	Yanina Iglesias	46	Federico Baldino	16
Country	Federico Baldino	36	Franco Ibáñez	10
Reggaeton II	Julieta Ponce	40	Mariano De la Canal	17
Latin Adagio I	Magdalena Bravi	47	Joaquín Starosta	21
Strip Dance II	Magdalena Bravi	40	Federico Baldino	18
Music videos	Magdalena Bravi	50	Joaquín Starosta	27
Pole dance II	Magdalena Bravi	46	Mariano De la Canal	18
Cuarteto II	Magdalena Bravi	42	Joaquín Starosta	15

== Camp Acitivies Score ==
In the second week of the competition, the coach of the camp's activities, Manuel Vismara, has to pick the contestant with the best and worst performances during the week. The contestant/s with the worst performance/s, is/are sent to the duel. The camp activities were not scored anymore from week 18 onward.

Contestant	Wk 2	Wk 3	Wk 4	Wk 5	Wk 6	Wk 7	Wk 8	Wk 9	Wk 10	Wk 11	Wk 12	Wk 13	Wk 14	Wk 15	Wk 16	Wk 17	Wk 18		Wk 19		Wk 20		Wk 21		Wk 22
Magdalena	SAFE	SAFE	SAFE	SAFE	HIGH	SAFE	SAFE	SAFE	SAFE	SAFE	SAFE	SAFE	SAFE	SAFE	LOW	HIGH	-	-	-	-	-	-	-	-	Winner
Mariano D.	SAFE	SAFE	SAFE	SAFE	SAFE	SAFE	SAFE	SAFE	SAFE	SAFE	SAFE	SAFE	SAFE	SAFE	HIGH	SAFE	-	-	-	-	-	-	-	-	Runner-Up
Federico	LOW	SAFE	SAFE	SAFE	SAFE	SAFE	SAFE	SAFE	SAFE	HIGH	SAFE	SAFE	SAFE	LOW	SAFE	SAFE	-	-	-	-	-	-	-	-	Semifinalist
Augusto	SAFE	SAFE	HIGH	SAFE	SAFE	SAFE	SAFE	SAFE	SAFE	SAFE	SAFE	SAFE	SAFE	SAFE	SAFE	SAFE	-	-	-	-	-	-	-	Semifinalist	
Joaquín	SAFE	SAFE	SAFE	SAFE	SAFE	SAFE	LOW	SAFE	SAFE	SAFE	SAFE	SAFE	LOW	SAFE	SAFE	SAFE	-	-	-	-	-	-	Eliminated 5th		
Facundo	SAFE	SAFE	SAFE	LOW	SAFE	SAFE	SAFE	SAFE	E.19th	SAFE	SAFE	SAFE	SAFE	LOW	SAFE	SAFE	-	-	-	-	-	Eliminated 6th			
Yanina	SAFE	HIGH	SAFE	SAFE	SAFE	SAFE	Disqualified			SAFE	SAFE	SAFE	SAFE	SAFE	SAFE	SAFE	-	-	-	-	Eliminated 7th				
Ana	SAFE	SAFE	SAFE	SAFE	SAFE	LOW	SAFE	HIGH	SAFE	SAFE	SAFE	SAFE	SAFE	SAFE	SAFE	SAFE	-	-	-	Eliminated 8th					
Julieta P.	SAFE	LOW	SAFE	SAFE	SAFE	SAFE	HIGH	SAFE	SAFE	LOW	SAFE	SAFE	SAFE	SAFE	SAFE	SAFE	-	-	Eliminated 9th						
Maribel	SAFE	SAFE	SAFE	SAFE	LOW	SAFE	SAFE	SAFE	SAFE	SAFE	LOW	SAFE	SAFE	HIGH	SAFE	LOW	-	Eliminated 10th							
Franco	Was not in the competition									SAFE	SAFE	SAFE	HIGH	SAFE	SAFE	SAFE	Eliminated 11th								
Agustín	SAFE	SAFE	SAFE	SAFE	SAFE	HIGH	SAFE	SAFE	SAFE	SAFE	SAFE	SAFE	SAFE	SAFE	SAFE	Eliminated 12th									
Nicolás	SAFE	SAFE	SAFE	SAFE	SAFE	SAFE	SAFE	SAFE	SAFE	SAFE	HIGH	LOW	SAFE	SAFE	Eliminated 13th										
Clara	SAFE	SAFE	LOW	SAFE	SAFE	SAFE	SAFE	SAFE	SAFE	SAFE	SAFE	HIGH	SAFE	Eliminated 14th											
Rubén	SAFE	SAFE	SAFE	SAFE	Eliminated 23rd					SAFE	SAFE	SAFE	Eliminated 15th												
Soledad	SAFE	SAFE	HIGH	SAFE	SAFE	SAFE	SAFE	SAFE	SAFE	SAFE	SAFE	Eliminated 16th													
Julieta G.	Was not in the competition							SAFE	SAFE	SAFE	Eliminated 17th														
Daniela	Was not in the competition						SAFE	LOW	LOW	Eliminated 18th															
Leandro	SAFE	SAFE	SAFE	SAFE	SAFE	SAFE	SAFE	HIGH	SAFE	Quit															
Martín	HIGH	SAFE	SAFE	SAFE	SAFE	SAFE	SAFE	Eliminated 20th																	
Vanesa	SAFE	SAFE	SAFE	SAFE	SAFE	SAFE	SAFE	Disqualified																	
Mariano R.	SAFE	SAFE	SAFE	SAFE	SAFE	LOW	Eliminated 21st																		
Carolina	SAFE	SAFE	SAFE	SAFE	SAFE	Eliminated 22nd																			
Julieta C.	SAFE	SAFE	SAFE	Eliminated 24th																					
Emanuel	SAFE	SAFE	Eliminated 25th																						
Gabriela	LOW	Eliminated 26th																							

– Best performance during the camp's activities of the week
– Best performance during the camp's activities of the week but being sent to the public vote/duel for other reasons
– Worst performance during the camp's activities of the week and sent to the public vote/duel being saved
– Worst performance during the camp's activities of the week and sent to the public vote/duel being eliminated
– Safe but being sent to the public vote/duel for other reasons

== Negative votes ==
	1	2	3	4	5	6	7	8	9	10	11	12	13	14	15	16	17	18	19	20	21	22	23
Augusto	Magdalena	Maribel	Mariano R.	Maribel	Rubén	Soledad	Nicolás	Julieta P.	Julieta P.	Federico	Yanina	Nicolás	Nicolás	Federico	Franco	Joaquín	Federico	Joaquín	Ana	Joaquín	Magdalena	Federico	
Facundo	Magdalena	Maribel	Mariano R.	Maribel	Rubén	Soledad	Mariano D.	Soledad	Maribel			Augusto	Rubén	Rubén	Agustín	Maribel	Agustín	Maribel	Maribel	Augusto	Augusto	Augusto	
Federico	Magdalena	Maribel	Mariano R.	Maribel	Rubén	Clara	Yanina	Soledad	Maribel	Magdalena	Facundo	Augusto	Rubén	Rubén	Agustín	Maribel	Agustín	Maribel	Maribel	Augusto	Augusto	Augusto	
Joaquín	Mariano D.	Julieta C.	Soledad	Leandro	Leandro	Mariano D.	Mariano D.	Soledad	Maribel	Julieta G.	Rubén	Soledad	Mariano D.	Rubén	Agustín	Maribel	Agustín	Maribel	Maribel	Augusto	Augusto	Augusto	
Magdalena	Salomé	Yanina	Julieta C.	Vanesa	Clara	Vanesa	Nicolás	Julieta P.	Julieta P.	Federico	Mariano R.	Nicolás	Nicolás	Federico	Federico	Joaquín	Federico	Joaquín	Ana	Joaquín	Ana	Federico	
Mariano D.	Magdalena	Joaquín	Mariano R.	Maribel	Rubén	Soledad	Facundo	Soledad	Julieta P.	Julieta G.	Facundo	Nicolás	Franco	Franco	Franco	Joaquín	Federico	Joaquín	Ana	Joaquín	Joaquín	Federico	
Yanina	Magdalena	Ana	Mariano R.	Julieta P.	Rubén	Vanesa	Nicolás					Nicolás	Soledad	Federico	Franco	Joaquín	Federico	Joaquín	Ana	Joaquín	Magdalena	Federico	
Ana	Carolina	Yanina	Julieta C.	Vanesa	Facundo	Vanesa	Nicolás	Soledad	Magdalena	Magdalena	Facundo	Augusto	Rubén	Rubén	Agustín	Agustín	Agustín	Maribel	Maribel	Augusto	Magdalena		
Julieta P.	Gabriela	Yanina	Julieta C.	Vanesa	Rubén	Soledad	Agustín	Soledad	Maribel	Julieta G.	Facundo	Augusto	Rubén	Rubén	Agustín	Maribel	Agustín	Maribel	Maribel	Augusto			
Maribel	Leandro	Yanina	Julieta C.	Vanesa	Clara	Vanesa	Nicolás	Julieta P.	Julieta P.	Soledad	Mariano R.	Julieta G.	Franco	Federico	Franco	Joaquín	Federico	Joaquín	Ana				
Franco											Facundo	Mariano D.	Mariano D.	Rubén	Agustín	Maribel	Agustín	Joaquín					
Agustín	Magdalena	Julieta C.	Julieta C.	Julieta P.	Facundo	Julieta P.	Nicolás	Soledad	Julieta P.	Ana	Rubén	Julieta G.	Federico	Federico	Federico	Joaquín	Federico						
Nicolás	Emanuel	Yanina	Julieta C.	Joaquín	Joaquín	Soledad	Yanina	Soledad	Maribel	Magdalena	Vanesa	Augusto	Rubén	Rubén	Agustín	Maribel							
Clara	Carolina	Yanina	Julieta C.	Vanesa	Yanina	Soledad	Federico	Soledad	Maribel	Magdalena	Facundo	Augusto	Rubén	Rubén	Agustín								
Rubén	Magdalena	Julieta C.	Julieta C.	Julieta P.	Facundo							Federico	Federico	Federico									
Soledad	Joaquín	Joaquín	Vanesa	Vanesa	Rubén	Vanesa	Nicolás	Ana	Julieta P.	Julieta G.	Mariano R.	Nicolás	Maribel										
Julieta G.									Maribel	Magdalena	Facundo	Augusto											
Daniela								Soledad	Soledad	Soledad													
Leandro	Magdalena	Gabriela	Mariano R.	Maribel	Facundo	Julieta P.	Nicolás	Soledad	Julieta P.	Julieta G.													
Martín	Clara	Julieta C.	Julieta C.	Julieta P.	Facundo	Julieta P.	Soledad	Soledad															
Vanesa	Leandro	Soledad	Mariano R.	Maribel	Julieta P.	Soledad	Augusto	Soledad															
Mariano R.	Leandro	Yanina	Julieta C.	Vanesa	Facundo	Vanesa	Nicolás																
Carolina	Magdalena	Ana	Mariano R.	Maribel	Clara	Vanesa																	
Julieta C.	Magdalena	Maribel	Mariano R.	Maribel																			
Emanuel	Nicolás	Maribel	Mariano R.																				
Gabriela	Julieta P.	Yanina																					
Salomé	Magdalena																						

- In week 11, the contestants gave positive votes to the eliminated contestants that were given a second chance to return.
