= Jakarta (DJs) =

- Origin: France
- Genres: Electro house; tribal house; progressive house
- Years active: 2005–present
- Labels: Tektonik Records; Hypertraxx Records

Jakarta is a French EDM and electro house production team, consisting of Danny Wild, Alan Pride, David Kane, and Dave King. Their work is available on Hypetraxx Records, and has been remixed by Mondotek. Their music is in the tribal house style, but with a childlike voice sung by Adrian Winkler, but the song’s lyrics were written by Sirko Falke, and they did other vocal work on other dance tracks during the time. Their most relevant tracks are "Superstar" and "One Desire", which did well on the French charts in 2008.

Their first single, "One Desire", was distributed by Airplay Records for France, Universal (Belgium, Spain), Dancestreet (Germany), Sony BMG (Mexico), TMC Nordic (Scandinavia), Magic Records (Poland), and Teta (Israel). "One Desire" stayed at number 2 on the charts for four months in 2008.

The group created two 3D animated video clips with characters that are mostly babies. Their main character is Totosse, a dancing baby with a red Mohawk haircut.

== Discography ==
=== Studio albums ===
List of studio albums
Title	Album details
BabyStar	Released: 2010; Label: Hypertraxx Records; Formats: Digital download, CD
