= Jakarta! =

2012 novel by Christophe Dorigné-Thomson

First edition

Jakarta! is the first novel by writer Christophe Dorigné-Thomson, published by the Indonesian media conglomerate Kompas Gramedia Group in 2012.

Jakarta! was widely promoted in the media and endorsed by major Indonesian figures such as businessman and owner of football club Inter Milan Erick Thohir, businessman and politician Sandiaga Uno, politician Irman Gusman, Minister of Education Anies Baswedan and actor Rio Dewanto.

The novel tells the story of a young European who travels the world on missions paid by governments or multinationals to kill high-level targets. The book is, in fact, a disguised essay on geopolitical shifts and their consequences.

The author's second book, WNI Dilarang Baca!, was published by Mizan Group in 2015.
