= Soñando por Bailar =

- Logo
- Directed by: Alejandro Ripoll
- Presented by: Viviana Canosa (1); Santiago del Moro (2)
- Country of origin: Argentina

Production
- Running time: 130 mins. approx.

Original release
- Network: El Trece
- Release: January 4, 2011 – present

Soñando por Bailar 2011 is an Argentinian reality show hosted by Santiago del Moro and broadcast by El Trece. Unlike Bailando por un Sueño, every week the contestants danced along with a professional dancer but the jury scored the couples with a positive vote and the remaining contestants give a negative vote to another contestant. A group of young contestants compete for the chance to be competing in Bailando por un Sueño, the show hosted by Marcelo Tinelli.

== Judges ==
In the first season of Soñando por Bailar the judges were the journalists Marcelo Polino and Angel de Brito, the professional dancer and actress Laura Fidalgo, and comedian and vedette Celina Rucci. During the competition, Jorge Lafauci, another noted journalist, was added into the panel. Carolina "Pampita" Ardohain reaplced Fidalgo during the season premiere of the show.

In the second season, the panel of judges had some changes: the only judges from the previous season that kept his place were journalists Marcelino Polino and Ángel de Brito, while the new judges were the professional dancer Silvina Escudero, media personality Amalia Granata and former vedette, actress and art director Reina Reech.

== Show Format ==
The contestants live isolated in a house where they take dancing classes with professional teachers. Every week, they have to dance a different style. In the first season, every judge had the opportunity to pick two contestants and give them positive votes. The coaches had also the chance to give only one positive vote to one of the contestants. The contestant with the most positive votes, had the opportunity to pick another contestant and send him/her to the public vote (where he/she can be eliminated), or be immune from the following week's elimination. As well as the positive votes, there were also negative votes, given by every contestant to another. The two contestants with the lowest count of votes, were put in discussion to the public vote, where one of them was going to be eliminated.

In the second season, the judges score the contestants one by one in a scale of 1 to 10. The contestant with the lowest score is automatically sent to the public vote, while the contestant with highest score is called the "supreme" and has the chance to pick another contestant and send him/her to the public vote (where he/she can be eliminated), or be immune from the following week's elimination. There is also a coach who supervises the contestants during the week, in their works in the castle where they live. The contestant/s with the worst performance during the week, is/are also sent to the public vote.

== Prize ==
The winner of the show, has the chance to be part of the casting of Bailando por un Sueño. Eugenia Lemos, the first winner, competed in the seventh season of the show and finished 10th out of the 30 couples that started the competition. Hernán Cabanas, the runner-up of Soñando por Bailar 2011, got also the opportunity to be on Bailando 2011, but he was eliminated in the third round.

== Seasons ==
Season	Premiere Date	Winner	Runner-Up	Other contestants in order of elimination	Number of contestants	Location
1	January 4, 2011	Eugenia Lemos	Hernán Cabanas	Jonatan Conejeros, María Laspiur, Julieta Biesa, Nahuel da Costa, Xoana González, Bárbara Franco, Diego Achar, Agustina Soma, Elías Makoul, José María Gómez, Ailén Rodríguez, Andrea López, Janah Grinfield, Jonathan González, Benjamín Saavedra (quit), Christian Cabrera, Paula Ávila, Emiliano Messina, Yamila Piñero, Gabriel Martina	22	Tigre, Buenos Aires Province
2	December 2, 2011	Magdalena Bravi	Mariano de la Canal	Salomé Calamonici, Gabriela Flores, Emanuel Alegre, Julieta Carbonell, Carolina Puntonet, Mariano Rodríguez, Vanesa Simón (disqualified), Martín Parra, Leandro Martínez (quit), Daniela Pantano, Julieta Gómez (†), Soledad Cescato, Rubén Silva, Clara Douradinha, Nicolás Ramírez, Agustín Morgante, Franco Mariano Ibañez, Maribel Varela, Julieta Ponce, Ana Izaguirre, Yanina Iglesias, Facundo González, Joaquín Starosta, Augusto Buccafusco, Federico Baldino	24	General Rodríguez, Buenos Aires Province
