= Disaster Kleenup International =

DKI (Disaster Kleenup International)
- Industry: Disaster recovery and prevention
- Founded: 1974
- Headquarters: Elk Grove Village, Illinois (corporate headquarters), United States
- Number of locations: Over 500 franchises in the United States and Canada
- Area served: United States, Canada, Ireland
- Services: emergency property restoration
- Revenue: $1.7 Billion (June 2013)
- Website: www.dkiservices.com

DKI (Disaster Kleenup International) is the largest organization in North America that contracts for disaster restoration. In June 2013, its annual revenue was $1.7 billion. The organization began franchising in 1994. The organization operates a network that supports its member companies, which operate as independent contractors.

== Member companies ==
The organization provides a brand for marketing purposes, workshops and training programs, claims support, and marketing initiatives. It also operates a 24-hour call center that is used by its member companies, customers and insurance companies.

Disaster Kleenup International (Canada) Ltd. operates in Canada. Campbell DKI operates as Campbell Builders, Inc., and has been existent in Columbus, Ohio for over 32 years. Utah Disaster Kleenup is the largest restoration firm in the state of Utah, is based in Draper, Utah, and in 1996, it significantly increased its plant size and equipment base, along with increasing its work force by 29%.
