= Electro dance =

Type of dance

French Electro dance (also known as Tecktonik and Milky Way) is a style of street dance typically performed to electro house music. It incorporates elements from various dance styles, including industrial dance, Moroccan chaabi, disco, vogue, waacking, hip-hop, and freehand glowsticking. The style emerged in the 2000s in the southern suburbs of Paris, France, particularly at the Metropolis nightclub, and later spread internationally. Fast-paced techno and electro house music, often imported from Northern Europe, is commonly used for Tecktonik dancing.

Electro dance emphasises arm movements, drawing from glowsticking techniques such as freehand patterns, the figure eight, and the concept of a leading hand (in which one hand geometrically follows the other). The style also incorporates disco-inspired poses and angular movements. Lower-body movement typically involves shuffling steps and rhythmic footwork performed in time with the music, sometimes incorporating elements of toprock and b-boy-style footwork, reflecting hip-hop influences.

The term "Tecktonik" is a registered trademark originating in Paris, which has created legal restrictions on the commercial use of the name. The creators of the Tecktonik brand, including Cyril Blanc, artistic director of Metropolis, have sold official merchandise such as clothing, compilation CDs, and energy drinks.

== History ==
In 2002, Cyril Blanc and Alexandre Barouzdin organised "Tecktonik Killer" parties under their project "Tecktonik Events" to promote two music styles popular in Belgium and the Netherlands: hardstyle and jumpstyle. These events were held at the Metropolis nightclub and included themed nights such as "Blackout", "Electro Rocker", and "Tecktonik Killer". Blanc has stated that the name "Tecktonik" is a pun on the theory of tectonic plates.

Alongside the events, Blanc and Barouzdin developed a visual identity for the movement, characterised by neon colours, fingerless gloves, and tight clothing. Following the events' success, Blanc registered the "Tecktonik" and "TCK" trademarks with the National Industrial Property Institute (INPI) and internationally in 2007, in order to prevent other clubs from using the name commercially. Branded products were subsequently marketed, including clothing and an energy drink. Other Paris clubs, including Mix Club and Red Light, later hosted similar events.

Tecktonik gained wider popularity in 2007 through street gatherings and online video sharing. Mainstream media coverage further increased its visibility. The dance appeared in music videos such as "Alive" by Mondotek, the Tepr remix of "A cause des Garçons" by Yelle, and "Sucker" by Dim Chris, as well as releases by artists including Lorie. In September 2007, the Techno Parade in Paris contributed to the movement's public exposure.

In November 2007, TF1 became the official international agency for Tecktonik, with the aim of promoting the brand outside France.

Clubs must obtain permission from Cyril Blanc and Alexandre Barouzdin to use the terms "Tecktonik" or "TCK".
