= Mondotek =

German electronic dance music band

- Origin: Germany
- Genres: Electronic, house, breakbeat, Hi-NRG
- Years active: 2002-present
- Label: Hypetraxx Records (France)
- Members: Danny Daagard; Steve Morane
- Website: Official website

Mondotek is a German electronic dance music band which started its career in France, with members Danny Daagard and Steve Morane. Their most popular hit is "Alive!". They are also known for their remix of One Desire by Jakarta.

== Singles ==
Year	Title	Peak position					
Year	Title	France	Netherlands	Germany	Switzerland	Poland	Russia
2007	"Alive!"	2	73	2	44	1	26
2008	"D-Generation"	36	-	-	-	-	-
2009	"Before"	-	-	-	-	-	-
2010	"Digiben" (feat. Carlprit)	-	-	-	-	-	-
2010	"Pink Lips"	-	-	-	-	-	-
