= 2024 Leagues Cup knockout stage =

Second and final stage of soccer tournament

The knockout stage of the 2024 Leagues Cup was the second and final stage of the competition, following the group stage. The knockout stage began on August 7 and concluded with the final on August 25. The top two teams from each group advanced to the knockout stage to compete in a single-elimination tournament. There were 32 matches in the knockout stage, including a third-place playoff played between the two losing semifinalists.

== Format ==
The knockout stage of the 2024 Leagues Cup was contested between the 30 teams that qualified from the group stage and two that received a bye. Matches in the knockout stage were played to a finish. If the score of a match was level at the end of 90 minutes, no extra time was played, and the match was decided by a penalty shoot-out.

== Qualified teams ==
The top two placed teams from each of the top fifteen groups qualified for the knockout stage, joining América and Columbus Crew, who both received byes to this round.

League path
League	Team	Qualification
Liga MX	(Mexico) América	Champion with the most points in the accumulated table of the 2023 Clausura and 2023 Apertura tournaments
MLS	(United States) Columbus Crew	MLS Cup 2023 winner

Group stage path
Group	Winners	Runners-up
W1	(United States) Austin FC	(Mexico) UNAM
W2	(United States) LA Galaxy	(United States) San Jose Earthquakes
W3	(Mexico) Juárez	(United States) St. Louis City SC
W4	(Mexico) Toluca	(United States) Sporting Kansas City
W5	(United States) Portland Timbers	(United States) Colorado Rapids
W6	(Mexico) Necaxa	(United States) Seattle Sounders FC
W7	(Canada) Vancouver Whitecaps FC	(United States) Los Angeles FC
W8	(United States) Houston Dynamo FC	(Mexico) Atlas
E1	(United States) FC Cincinnati	(United States) New York City FC
E2	(United States) Orlando City SC	(Canada) CF Montréal
E3	(Mexico) UANL	(United States) Inter Miami CF
E4	(United States) Philadelphia Union	(Mexico) Cruz Azul
E5	(United States) New England Revolution	(Mexico) Mazatlán
E6	(Canada) Toronto FC	(Mexico) Pachuca
E7	(United States) D.C. United	(Mexico) Santos Laguna

== Bracket ==
The tournament bracket is shown below, with bold denoting the winners of each match.

Round of 32
August 9 – San Diego, CA
**(Mexico) América**	**2**
(Mexico) Atlas	1
August 9 – St. Louis, MO
**(United States) St. Louis City SC**	**3**
(United States) Portland Timbers	1
August 9 – Houston, TX
**(Mexico) Toluca (p)**	**2 (5)**
(United States) Houston Dynamo FC	2 (4)
August 9 – Commerce City, CO
(Mexico) Juárez	2
**(United States) Colorado Rapids**	**3**
August 8 – Seattle, WA
(United States) LA Galaxy	1
**(United States) Seattle Sounders FC**	**3**
August 7 – Vancouver, BC
**(Mexico) UNAM**	**2**
(Canada) Vancouver Whitecaps FC	0
August 7 – Los Angeles, CA
**(United States) Los Angeles FC**	**2**
(United States) Austin FC	0
August 8 – San Jose, CA
(Mexico) Necaxa	0
**(United States) San Jose Earthquakes**	**5**
August 9 – Cincinnati, OH
**(United States) FC Cincinnati (p)**	**1 (6)**
(Mexico) Santos Laguna	1 (5)
August 9 – Chester, PA
(Canada) CF Montréal	0
**(United States) Philadelphia Union**	**2**
August 9 – Washington, D.C.
(United States) D.C. United	1
**(Mexico) Mazatlán**	**2**
August 9 – Orlando, FL
**(Mexico) Cruz Azul (p)**	**0 (5)**
(United States) Orlando City SC	0 (4)
August 8 – Austin, TX
**(Mexico) UANL**	**1**
(Mexico) Pachuca	0
August 9 – Foxborough, MA
**(United States) New York City FC (p)**	**1 (7)**
(United States) New England Revolution	1 (6)
August 9 – Columbus, OH
(United States) Sporting Kansas City	0
**(United States) Columbus Crew**	**4**
August 8 – Fort Lauderdale, FL
(Canada) Toronto FC	3
**(United States) Inter Miami CF**	**4**

Round of 16
August 13 – Carson, CA
**(Mexico) América**	**4**
(United States) St. Louis City SC	2
August 13 – Commerce City, CO
(Mexico) Toluca	1
**(United States) Colorado Rapids**	**2**
August 12 – Seattle, WA
**(United States) Seattle Sounders FC**	**4**
(Mexico) UNAM	0
August 13 – Los Angeles, CA
**(United States) Los Angeles FC**	**4**
(United States) San Jose Earthquakes	1
August 13 – Cincinnati, OH
(United States) FC Cincinnati	2
**(United States) Philadelphia Union**	**4**
August 13 – Washington, D.C.
**(Mexico) Mazatlán (p)**	**2 (3)**
(Mexico) Cruz Azul	2 (1)
August 13 – Harrison, NJ
(Mexico) UANL	1
**(United States) New York City FC**	**2**
August 13 – Columbus, OH
**(United States) Columbus Crew**	**3**
(United States) Inter Miami CF	2

Quarterfinals
August 17 – Carson, CA
(Mexico) América	0 (8)
**(United States) Colorado Rapids (p)**	**0 (9)**
August 17 – Seattle, WA
(United States) Seattle Sounders FC	0
**(United States) Los Angeles FC**	**3**
August 17 – Chester, PA
**(United States) Philadelphia Union (p)**	**1 (4)**
(Mexico) Mazatlán	1 (3)
August 17 – Columbus, OH
(United States) New York City FC	1 (3)
**(United States) Columbus Crew (p)**	**1 (4)**

Semifinals
August 21 – Los Angeles, CA
(United States) Colorado Rapids	0
**(United States) Los Angeles FC**	**4**
August 21 – Columbus, OH
(United States) Philadelphia Union	1
**(United States) Columbus Crew**	**3**

Final
August 25 – Columbus, OH
(United States) Los Angeles FC	1
**(United States) Columbus Crew**	**3**
Third place playoff
August 25 – Chester, PA
**(United States) Colorado Rapids (p)**	**2 (3)**
(United States) Philadelphia Union	2 (1)

== Round of 32 ==
=== Summary ===
Team 1	Score	Team 2
Los Angeles FC (United States)	2–0	(United States) Austin FC
Vancouver Whitecaps FC (Canada)	0–2	(Mexico) UNAM
Inter Miami CF (United States)	4–3	(Canada) Toronto FC
UANL (Mexico)	1–0	(Mexico) Pachuca
Seattle Sounders FC (United States)	3–1	(United States) LA Galaxy
San Jose Earthquakes (United States)	5–0	(Mexico) Necaxa
FC Cincinnati (United States)	1–1 (6–5 p)	(Mexico) Santos Laguna
Columbus Crew (United States)	4–0	(United States) Sporting Kansas City
D.C. United (United States)	1–2	(Mexico) Mazatlán
New England Revolution (United States)	1–1 (6–7 p)	(United States) New York City FC
Orlando City SC (United States)	0–0 (4–5 p)	(Mexico) Cruz Azul
Philadelphia Union (United States)	2–0	(Canada) CF Montréal
St. Louis City SC (United States)	3–1	(United States) Portland Timbers
Toluca (Mexico)	2–2 (5–4 p)	(United States) Houston Dynamo FC
Juárez (Mexico)	2–3	(United States) Colorado Rapids
América (Mexico)	2–1	(Mexico) Atlas

=== Matches ===
August 7, 2024
22:30 (19:30 UTC−7)

Los Angeles FC (United States)	2–0	(United States) Austin FC
Bouanga 11'; Olivera 61'	Report

BMO Stadium, Los Angeles, California
Attendance: 12,930
Referee: Jon Freemon (United States)

August 7, 2024
22:30 (19:30 UTC−7)

Vancouver Whitecaps FC (Canada)	0–2	(Mexico) UNAM
	Report	Huerta 36'; Ruvalcaba 57'

BC Place, Vancouver, British Columbia
Attendance: 9,691
Referee: César Ramos (Mexico)

August 8, 2024
19:30

Inter Miami CF (United States)	4–3	(Canada) Toronto FC
Rojas 3', 59'; Gómez 11'; Suárez 20'	Report	Insigne 15' (pen.), 41' (pen.); Allen 79' (o.g.)

Chase Stadium, Fort Lauderdale, Florida
Attendance: 10,543
Referee: Adonai Escobedo (Mexico)

August 8, 2024
21:00 (20:00 UTC−5)

UANL (Mexico)	1–0	(Mexico) Pachuca
Flores 65'	Report

Q2 Stadium, Austin, Texas
Attendance: 5,520
Referee: Mario Escobar (Guatemala)

August 8, 2024
22:30 ET

Seattle Sounders FC (United States)	3–1	(United States) LA Galaxy
Yeimar 4'; Ragen 7'; A. Roldán 45+4'	Report	Pec 83'

Lumen Field, Seattle, Washington
Attendance: 17,242
Referee: Lukasz Szpala (United States)

August 8, 2024
23:00 ET

San Jose Earthquakes (United States)	5–0	(Mexico) Necaxa
Yueill 5'; López 17'; Ebobisse 29', 35'; Marie 88'	Report

PayPal Park, San Jose, California
Attendance: 10,227
Referee: Ismael Cornejo (El Salvador)

August 9, 2024
19:30

FC Cincinnati (United States)	1–1	(Mexico) Santos Laguna
Orellano 11'	Report	Lozano 5'
Penalties
Acosta (penalty scored); Kelsy (penalty scored); Orellano (penalty scored); Baird (penalty scored); Bucha (penalty scored); Sérgio Santos (penalty scored)	6–5	(penalty scored) Villalba; (penalty scored) Amione; (penalty scored) Núñez; (penalty scored) Naveda; (penalty scored) Macías; (penalty missed) A. López

TQL Stadium, Cincinnati, Ohio
Attendance: 18,014
Referee: Victor Cáceres (Mexico)

August 9, 2024
19:30

Columbus Crew (United States)	4–0	(United States) Sporting Kansas City
Rossi 44', 57'; Jones 77'; Chambost 79'	Report

Lower.com Field, Columbus, Ohio
Attendance: 20,397
Referee: Juan Gabriel Calderón (Costa Rica)

August 9, 2024
19:30

D.C. United (United States)	1–2	(Mexico) Mazatlán
Klich 74'	Report	Bárcenas 34'; Rubio 43'

Audi Field, Washington, D.C.
Attendance: 8,808
Referee: Selvin Brown (Honduras)

August 9, 2024
19:30

New England Revolution (United States)	1–1	(United States) New York City FC
Wood 40'	Report	Rodríguez 35' (pen.)
Penalties
McNamara (penalty scored); Polster (penalty scored); Harkes (penalty scored); Arreaga (penalty scored); Bye (penalty scored); Panayotou (penalty scored); Kaye (penalty missed)	6–7	(penalty scored) Martínez; (penalty scored) Martins; (penalty scored) Moralez; (penalty scored) Sands; (penalty scored) Rodríguez; (penalty scored) Fernández; (penalty scored) Haak

Gillette Stadium, Foxborough, Massachusetts
Attendance: 7,267
Referee: Julio Luna (Guatemala)

August 9, 2024
19:30

Orlando City SC (United States)	0–0	(Mexico) Cruz Azul
	Report
Penalties
Jansson (penalty missed); Lodeiro (penalty scored); Muriel (penalty scored); McGuire (penalty scored); Torres (penalty scored); Þórhallsson (penalty missed)	4–5	(penalty missed) Rivero; (penalty scored) Montaño; (penalty scored) Ditta; (penalty scored) Piovi; (penalty scored) Sepúlveda; (penalty scored) Antuna

Inter&Co Stadium, Orlando, Florida
Attendance: 17,057
Referee: Fernando Guerrero (Mexico)

August 9, 2024
19:30

Philadelphia Union (United States)	2–0	(Canada) CF Montréal
Baribo 45+1', 90+6'	Report

Subaru Park, Chester, Pennsylvania
Attendance: 7,214
Referee: Daniel Quintero (Mexico)

August 9, 2024
20:30 ET

St. Louis City SC (United States)	3–1	(United States) Portland Timbers
Teuchert 51'; Hartel 83'; Becher 88'	Report	Bravo 54'

CityPark, St. Louis, Missouri
Attendance: 10,833
Referee: Pierre-Luc Lauzière (Canada)

August 9, 2024
20:30 (19:30 UTC−5)

Toluca (Mexico)	2–2	(United States) Houston Dynamo FC
Angulo 39'; López 90+6'	Report	Ponce 41'; Micael 62'
Penalties
Volpi (penalty scored); Morales (penalty scored); Paulinho (penalty scored); Gallardo (penalty scored); López (penalty scored)	5–4	(penalty scored) Dorsey; (penalty scored) Kowalczyk; (penalty scored) Ferreira; (penalty missed) Ennali; (penalty scored) Sviatchenko

Shell Energy Stadium, Houston, Texas
Attendance: 13,053
Referee: Rubiel Vazquez (United States)

August 9, 2024
21:30 ET

Juárez (Mexico)	2–3	(United States) Colorado Rapids
Zaldívar 18'; Hurtado 71' (pen.)	Report	Lewis 28'; Mihailovic 45' (pen.); Harris 59'

Dick's Sporting Goods Park, Commerce City, Colorado
Attendance: 11,442
Referee: Armando Villarreal (United States)

August 9, 2024
22:00 (19:00 UTC−7)

América (Mexico)	2–1	(Mexico) Atlas
É. Sánchez 20'; Martín 73'	Report	R. Lozano 59'

Snapdragon Stadium, San Diego, California
Attendance: 21,311
Referee: Oshane Nation (Jamaica)

== Round of 16 ==
=== Summary ===
Team 1	Score	Team 2
Seattle Sounders FC (United States)	4–0	(Mexico) UNAM
Columbus Crew (United States)	3–2	(United States) Inter Miami CF
FC Cincinnati (United States)	2–4	(United States) Philadelphia Union
Cruz Azul (Mexico)	2–2 (1–3 p)	(Mexico) Mazatlán
UANL (Mexico)	1–2	(United States) New York City FC
Toluca (Mexico)	1–2	(United States) Colorado Rapids
América (Mexico)	4–2	(United States) St. Louis City SC
Los Angeles FC (United States)	4–1	(United States) San Jose Earthquakes

=== Matches ===
August 12, 2024
22:30 (19:30 UTC−7)

Seattle Sounders FC (United States)	4–0	(Mexico) UNAM
Rothrock 32'; Morris 58', 90+5' (pen.); Rusnák 71' (pen.)	Report

Lumen Field, Seattle, Washington
Attendance: 23,189
Referee: Joe Dickerson (United States)

August 13, 2024
19:30 ET

Columbus Crew (United States)	3–2	(United States) Inter Miami CF
Ramirez 67'; Rossi 69', 80'	Report	Rojas 10'; Gómez 62'

Lower.com Field, Columbus, Ohio
Attendance: 14,031
Referee: Iván Barton (El Salvador)

August 13, 2024
19:30 ET

FC Cincinnati (United States)	2–4	(United States) Philadelphia Union
Bucha 66'; Yedlin 80'	Report	Uhre 51'; Baribo 61', 81'; Sullivan 84'

TQL Stadium, Cincinnati, Ohio
Attendance: 15,710
Referee: Rubiel Vazquez (United States)

August 13, 2024
20:00 ET

Cruz Azul (Mexico)	2–2	(Mexico) Mazatlán
Antuna 84'; Ditta 90+1'	Report	Colula 40'; Bárcenas 45+1'
Penalties
Antuna (penalty missed); Rotondi (penalty scored); Ditta (penalty missed); Giakoumakis (penalty missed)	1–3	(penalty scored) Bárcenas; (penalty scored) Colula; (penalty scored) Torres

Audi Field, Washington, D.C.
Referee: Luis Enrique Santander (Mexico)

August 13, 2024
20:00 ET

UANL (Mexico)	1–2	(United States) New York City FC
Pizarro 18'	Report	Moralez 20'; Rodríguez 65'

Red Bull Arena, Harrison, New Jersey
Attendance: 12,041
Referee: Keylor Herrera (Costa Rica)

August 13, 2024
22:00 ET

Toluca (Mexico)	1–2	(United States) Colorado Rapids
Paulinho 83'	Report	Rafael Navarro 45'; Yapi 90+6'

Dick's Sporting Goods Park, Commerce City, Colorado
Attendance: 9,742
Referee: Walter López (Guatemala)

August 13, 2024
22:30 (19:30 UTC−7)

América (Mexico)	4–2	(United States) St. Louis City SC
B. Rodríguez 18', 86' (pen.); Valdés 79'; Aguirre 90+8'	Report	Vassilev 49'; Löwen 55' (pen.)

Dignity Health Sports Park, Carson, California
Attendance: 11,553
Referee: Marco Ortíz (Mexico)

August 13, 2024
22:30 (19:30 UTC−7)

Los Angeles FC (United States)	4–1	(United States) San Jose Earthquakes
Olivera 18'; Bouanga 45+5' (pen.), 66'; Bogusz 61'	Report	López 41'

BMO Stadium, Los Angeles, California
Attendance: 14,911
Referee: Pierre-Luc Lauzière (Canada)

== Quarterfinals ==
=== Summary ===
Team 1	Score	Team 2
Columbus Crew (United States)	1–1 (4–3 p)	(United States) New York City FC
Philadelphia Union (United States)	1–1 (4–3 p)	(Mexico) Mazatlán
Seattle Sounders FC (United States)	0–3	(United States) Los Angeles FC
América (Mexico)	0–0 (8–9 p)	(United States) Colorado Rapids

=== Matches ===
August 17, 2024
18:00 ET

Columbus Crew (United States)	1–1	(United States) New York City FC
Hernández 41'	Report	Martínez 1'
Penalties
Camacho (penalty scored); Russell-Rowe (penalty scored); Rossi (penalty missed); Hernández (penalty scored); Jones (penalty scored)	4–3	(penalty scored) Thiago Martins; (penalty scored) Bakrar; (penalty missed) Moralez; (penalty scored) Sands; (penalty missed) Rodríguez

Lower.com Field, Columbus, Ohio
Attendance: 14,071
Referee: Joe Dickerson (United States)

August 17, 2024
19:30 ET

Philadelphia Union (United States)	1–1	(Mexico) Mazatlán
Uhre 45+3'	Report	Escoboza 59'
Penalties
Martínez (penalty scored); Elliott (penalty scored); Lowe (penalty scored); Adeniran (penalty missed); Bueno (penalty scored)	4–3	(penalty missed) Colman; (penalty scored) Árciga; (penalty missed) Torres; (penalty scored) Escoboza; (penalty scored) Camacho

Subaru Park, Chester, Pennsylvania
Attendance: 9,336
Referee: Selvin Brown (Honduras)

August 17, 2024
20:00 ET

Seattle Sounders FC (United States)	0–3	(United States) Los Angeles FC
	Report	Hollingshead 14'; Kamara 25'; Bouanga 53'

Lumen Field, Seattle, Washington
Attendance: 19,643
Referee: César Ramos (Mexico)

August 17, 2024
22:00 ET

América (Mexico)	0–0	(United States) Colorado Rapids
	Report
Penalties
Martín (penalty scored); Reyes (penalty scored); Sánchez (penalty scored); Cáceres (penalty scored); Lichnovsky (penalty missed); Calderón (penalty scored); Fidalgo (penalty scored); Hernández (penalty scored); Espinoza (penalty scored); Malagón (penalty missed)	8–9	(penalty scored) Mihailovic; (penalty scored) Bassett; (penalty missed) Rafael Navarro; (penalty scored) Maxsø; (penalty scored) Ronan; (penalty scored) Rosenberry; (penalty scored) Larraz; (penalty scored) Vines; (penalty scored) Harris; (penalty scored) Steffen

Dignity Health Sports Park, Carson, California
Attendance: 22,462
Referee: Keylor Herrera (Costa Rica)

== Semifinals ==
=== Summary ===
Team 1	Score	Team 2
Columbus Crew (United States)	3–1	(United States) Philadelphia Union
Los Angeles FC (United States)	4–0	(United States) Colorado Rapids

=== Matches ===
August 21, 2024
19:30 ET

Columbus Crew (United States)	3–1	(United States) Philadelphia Union
Rossi 12', 43'; Hernández 53'	Report	Gazdag 32'

Lower.com Field, Columbus, Ohio
Attendance: 12,784
Referee: Armando Villarreal (United States)

August 21, 2024
22:00 ET

Los Angeles FC (United States)	4–0	(United States) Colorado Rapids
Bogusz 42'; Kamara 45'; Bouanga 59'; O'Brien 75'	Report

BMO Stadium, Los Angeles, California
Referee: Mario Escobar (Guatemala)

== Third place playoff ==
The winner of the third place match qualified for the first round of the 2025 CONCACAF Champions Cup.

=== Summary ===
Team 1	Score	Team 2
Philadelphia Union (United States)	2–2 (1–3 p)	(United States) Colorado Rapids

=== Matches ===
August 25, 2024
16:30 ET

Philadelphia Union (United States)	2–2	(United States) Colorado Rapids
Baribo 41', 44'	Report	Harris 38'; Larraz 49'
Penalties
Gazdag (penalty missed); Baribo (penalty missed); Elliott (penalty scored); Mbaizo (penalty missed)	1–3	(penalty scored) Mihailovic; (penalty scored) Bassett; (penalty scored) Maxsø; (penalty missed) Ronan

Subaru Park, Chester, Pennsylvania
Attendance: 8,417
Referee: Fernando Guerrero (Mexico)

== Final ==
Both clubs that made the final qualified for the 2025 CONCACAF Champions Cup, with the winner qualifying directly to the round of 16.

August 25, 2024
7:15 pm EDT

Columbus Crew (United States Soccer Federation)	3–1	(United States Soccer Federation) Los Angeles FC
Hernández 45', 90+2'; Russell-Rowe 90+4'	Report	Giroud 57'

Lower.com Field, Columbus, Ohio
Attendance: 20,190
Referee: Oshane Nation (Jamaica)
