= 2023 Columbus Crew season =

Columbus Crew
2023 season
- Investor-operators: Dee Haslam; Jimmy Haslam; JW Johnson; Whitney Johnson; Dr. Pete Edwards
- Head coach: Wilfried Nancy
- Stadium: Lower.com Field
- Major League Soccer: Conference: 3rd Overall: 3rd
- MLS Cup playoffs: Eastern Conference Champions; MLS Cup Champions
- U.S. Open Cup: Round of 16
- Leagues Cup: Round of 32
- Top goalscorer: League: Cucho Hernández (16); All: Cucho Hernández (24)
- Highest home attendance: 20,730 (8/20 v. CIN)
- Lowest home attendance: 19,249 (3/25 v. ATL)
- Average home league attendance: 20,325 (99.8%)
- Biggest win: CLB 6–1 ATL (3/25)
- Biggest defeat: PHI 4–1 CLB (2/25)
Home colors	Away colors

The 2023 Columbus Crew season was the club's 28th season of existence and their 28th consecutive season in Major League Soccer, the top flight of soccer in the United States and Canada. The first match of the season was on February 25 against Philadelphia Union. It was the first season under head coach Wilfried Nancy. This was also the first season since 2016 without former captain Jonathan Mensah and midfielder Artur.

The Crew won the MLS Cup against Los Angeles FC, their third league championship and second since 2020.

== Roster ==
As of As of game on December 9, 2023

Note: Flags indicate national team as defined under FIFA eligibility rules; some limited exceptions apply. Players may hold more than one non-FIFA nationality.

No.	Pos.	Nation	Player
2	DF	USA	Philip Quinton
3	DF	USA	Josh Williams
4	DF	FRA	Rudy Camacho (INT)
6	MF	USA	Darlington Nagbe (captain; DP)
7	DF	USA	Julian Gressel
8	MF	USA	Aidan Morris (SUP; HGP)
9	FW	COL	Cucho Hernández (INT; DP)
10	FW	URU	Diego Rossi (DP)
12	DF	ECU	Gustavo Vallecilla (on loan from Colorado Rapids) (INT)
13	FW	TTO	Kevin Molino
14	MF	GHA	Yaw Yeboah (INT)
16	MF	USA	Isaiah Parente (SUP; HGP)
17	FW	USA	Christian Ramirez
18	DF	DEN	Malte Amundsen
19	FW	CAN	Jacen Russell-Rowe (SUP; HGP)
20	FW	ROU	Alexandru Mățan (INT)

No.	Pos.	Nation	Player
21	DF	UKR	Yevhen Cheberko (INT)
22	DF	USA	Keegan Hughes (SUP; HGP)
23	DF	ALG	Mohamed Farsi (SUP; INT)
24	GK	USA	Evan Bush
25	MF	USA	Sean Zawadzki (SUP; HGP)
27	FW	USA	Maximilian Arfsten (SUP)
28	GK	USA	Patrick Schulte (SUP; GA)
30	MF	USA	Will Sands (SUP; HGP)
31	DF	CPV	Steven Moreira (INT)
32	GK	USA	Brady Scott
33	DF	USA	Jake Morris (SUP; HGP)
94	DF	COL	Jimmy Medranda

== Technical Staff ==
Position	Staff
President & General Manager	(United States) Tim Bezbatchenko
Head Coach	(France) Wilfried Nancy
Director of Scouting and Player Recruitment	(Scotland) Neil McGuinness
Vice President, Soccer Administration & Operations	(United States) Jaime McMillan
Technical Director	(United States) Marc Nicholls
Assistant General Manager, Player Personnel & Strategy	(France) Issa Tall
Assistant General Manager, Crew 2 General Manager	(Canada) Corey Wray
Assistant Coach	(Republic of Ireland) Kwame Ampadu
Assistant Coach	(France) Yoann Damet
Goalkeeper Coach	(United States) Phil Boerger
Assistant Coach	(Canada) Jules Gueguen
Video Performance Coach	(France) Maxime Chalier
Manager of Equipment Operations	(United States) David Brauzer
Assistant Equipment Manager	(United States) Ron Meadors
Coordinator, Team Operations and Player Care	(United States) Faith Lackey
Manager of Team Operations	(United States) Julio Velasquez
Data Analyst	(United States) Alex Mysiw
Head of Sport Science & Medicine	(United States) Chris Shenberger
Strength and Conditioning Coach	(United States) Luis Jeronimo
Manager, Player Personnel	(United States) Marshall Bushnell
Director of Performance	(Portugal) Federico Pizzuto
Sports Dietitian	(United States) Kyla Cross
Head Athletic Trainer	(United States) Chris Rumsey
Assistant Athletic Trainer	(United States) Catherine Hill
Assistant Athletic Trainer	(United States) Daniel Givens

Source: []

== Non-competitive ==
=== Preseason ===
February 4	Columbus Crew	v	Pittsburgh Riverhounds SC	Columbus, OH
		Source		Stadium: Historic Crew Stadium
Note: Closed-door; four 30-minute halves played; no scores released

February 11	Inter Miami CF	v	Columbus Crew	Fort Lauderdale, FL
		Source		Stadium: Florida Blue Training Center
Note: Closed-door; score not released

February 15	Columbus Crew	1–1	Houston Dynamo	Fort Lauderdale, FL
	Hernández	Report	Baird (pen.)
Note: Closed-door

February 18	Columbus Crew	2–1	Hartford Athletic	Fort Lauderdale, FL
		Report
Note: Closed-door; goalscoring information not released

== Competitive ==
=== Overview ===
Competition	First match	Last match	Starting round	Final position	Record							
Competition	First match	Last match	Starting round	Final position	Pld	W	D	L	GF	GA	GD	Win %
Major League Soccer	February 25, 2023	October 21, 2023	Matchday 1	3rd	34	16	9	9	67	46	+21	47.06
MLS Cup Playoffs	November 1, 2023	December 2, 2023	Round One	Winners	6	5	0	1	15	9	+6	83.33
U.S. Open Cup	April 26, 2023	May 24, 2023	Third Round	Round of 16	3	2	0	1	6	2	+4	66.67
Leagues Cup	July 23, 2023	August 4, 2023	Group Stage	Round of 32	3	2	1	0	9	5	+4	66.67
Total					46	25	10	11	97	62	+35	54.35

Source: Competitions

=== MLS ===
==== Standings ====
===== Eastern Conference =====
MLS Eastern Conference table (2023)
Pos	Team	Pld	W	L	T	GF	GA	GD	Pts	Qualification
1	FC Cincinnati	34	20	5	9	57	39	+18	69	Qualification for round one and the CONCACAF Champions Cup round one
2	Orlando City SC	34	18	7	9	55	39	+16	63	Qualification for round one
3	Columbus Crew	34	16	9	9	67	46	+21	57	Qualification for round one
4	Philadelphia Union	34	15	9	10	57	41	+16	55	Qualification for round one
5	New England Revolution	34	15	9	10	58	46	+12	55	Qualification for round one

Source: MLS
Rules for classification: 1) points; 2) total wins; 3) total goal differential; 4) total goals scored; 5) fewer disciplinary points; 6) away goal differential; 7) away goals scored; 8) home goals differential; 9) home goals scored; 10) coin toss (2 clubs tied) or drawing of lots (≥3 clubs tied)

===== Overall table =====
Overall MLS standings table
Pos	Team	Pld	W	L	T	GF	GA	GD	Pts	Qualification
1	FC Cincinnati (S)	34	20	5	9	57	39	+18	69	Qualification for the CONCACAF Champions Cup Round One (Note: As 2023 MLS Supporters' Shield champions)
2	Orlando City SC	34	18	7	9	55	39	+16	63	Qualification for the CONCACAF Champions Cup Round One (Note: As highest-ranked club in 2023 MLS Supporters' Shield not already qualified)
3	Columbus Crew (C)	34	16	9	9	67	46	+21	57	Qualification for the CONCACAF Champions Cup Round of 16 (Note: As 2023 MLS Cup champions)
4	St. Louis City SC	34	17	12	5	62	45	+17	56	Qualification for the CONCACAF Champions Cup Round One (Note: As 2023 Western Conference regular season champions)
5	Philadelphia Union	34	15	9	10	57	41	+16	55	Qualification for the CONCACAF Champions Cup Round One (Note: As 2023 Leagues Cup third place)

Source: MLS
Rules for classification: 1) points; 2) total wins; 3) total goal differential; 4) total goals scored; 5) fewer disciplinary points; 6) away goal differential; 7) away goals scored; 8) home goals differential; 9) home goals scored; 10) coin toss (2 clubs tied) or drawing of lots (≥3 clubs tied)
(C) MLS Cup champion; (S) Supporters' Shield winner
Notes:

fs

==== Results summary ====
Overall								Home						Away					
Pld	Pts	W	L	T	GF	GA	GD	W	L	T	GF	GA	GD	W	L	T	GF	GA	GD
34	57	16	9	9	67	46	+21	12	1	4	41	14	+27	4	8	5	26	32	−6

Source: MLS standings
Pld = Matches played; Pts = Points; W = Matches won; T = Matches tied; L = Matches lost; GF = Goals for; GA = Goals against; GD = Goal difference

==== Results by round ====
Round	1	2	3	4	5	6	7	8	9	10	11	12	13	14	15	16	17	18	19	20	21	22	23	24	25	26	27	28	29	30	31	32	33	34
Stadium	A	H	A	A	H	H	A	H	A	H	H	H	A	A	H	H	A	A	H	H	A	H	A	H	H	A	A	A	H	A	H	A	A	H
Result	L	W	D	L	W	W	W	D	L	L	D	W	L	L	W	W	W	D	W	W	D	D	L	W	W	L	W	L	W	D	D	W	D	W

Source: Columbus schedule
A = Away; H = Home; W = Win; D = Draw; L = Loss

==== Match results ====
February 25 1	Philadelphia Union	4–1	Columbus Crew	Chester, PA
7:30 PM EST	Gazdag 45+3' (pen.), 72' (pen.); Flach (yellow card) 47'; Carranza 52', 80'	Report	Glesnes 28' (o.g.); Morris (yellow card) 39'; Sands (yellow card) 43'; Hernández (yellow card) 56'; Zelarayán (yellow card) 58'; Degenek (yellow card) 71'	Stadium: Subaru Park; Attendance: 18,510; Referee: Lukasz Szpala; Assistant referees: Adam Wienckowski; Diego Blas; Fourth official: Ian McKay

March 4 2	Columbus Crew	2–0	D.C. United	Columbus, OH
7:30 PM EST	Zelarayán 10', 44'; Yeboah (yellow card) 65'	Report	Najar (yellow card) 59'; Klich (yellow card) 84'	Stadium: Lower.com Field; Attendance: 20,391; Referee: Marcos de Oliveira; Assistant referees: Corey Parker; Jeffrey Swartzel; Fourth official: Brian Dunn

March 11 3	Toronto FC	1–1	Columbus Crew	Toronto, ON
7:30 PM EST	Kerr 25'; Kaye (yellow card) 60'; Hedges (yellow card) 80'	Report	Quinton (yellow card) 32'; Morris (yellow card) 66'; Medranda 75'	Stadium: BMO Field; Attendance: 25,796; Referee: Ismir Pekmic; Assistant referees: Oscar Mitchell-Carvalho; Gianni Facchini; Fourth official: Filip Dujic

March 18 4	New York Red Bulls	2–1	Columbus Crew	Harrison, NJ
7:30 PM EDT	Cásseres (yellow card) 53'; Luquinhas 58'; Burke (yellow card) 63'; Vanzeir 86'	Report	Mățan 33'; Moreira (yellow card) 45+3'; Russell-Rowe (yellow card) 83'; Medranda (yellow card) 88'	Stadium: Red Bull Arena; Attendance: 15,412; Referee: Timothy Ford; Assistant referees: Ian Anderson; Brian Dunn; Fourth official: Guido Gonzalez Jr.

March 25 5	Columbus Crew	6–1	Atlanta United FC	Columbus, OH
7:30 PM EDT	A. Morris 14'; Ramirez 47', 64'; Quinton 51'; Russell-Rowe 68'; Mățan (yellow card) 81'; Arfsten 90+1'	Report	Wolff (yellow card) 45+2'; Ibarra (yellow card) 58'; Lennon 71'	Stadium: Lower.com Field; Attendance: 19,249; Referee: Ramy Touchan; Assistant referees: Adam Garner; Nick Balcer; Fourth official: Joshua Encarnacion

April 1 6	Columbus Crew	4–0	Real Salt Lake	Columbus, OH
7:30 PM EDT	Morris 14', 53'; Zelarayán 41' (pen.); Nagbe (yellow card) 64'; Yeboah 90+3'	Report	Meram (yellow card) 29'; Eneli (yellow card) 84'	Stadium: Lower.com Field; Attendance: 19,624; Referee: Rubiel Vazquez; Assistant referees: Adam Wienckowski; Brooke Mayo; Fourth official: Filip Dujic

April 8 7	D.C. United	0–2	Columbus Crew	Washington, DC
7:30 PM EDT	Canouse (yellow card) 45+5'; Benteke (yellow card) 58'; Klich (yellow card) 81'	Report	Zelarayán 39' (pen.); Ramirez 47'; Vallecilla (yellow card) 85'	Stadium: Audi Field; Attendance: 16,891; Referee: Rosendo Mendoza; Assistant referees: Corey Parker; Walter Heatherly; Fourth official: Armando Villarreal

April 15 8	Columbus Crew	1–1	New England Revolution	Columbus, OH
7:30 PM EDT	Mățan (yellow card) 23'; Degenek (yellow card) 43'; Zawadski 90+8'	Report	Borrero (yellow card) 56' (yellow-red card) 65'; Degenek 58' (o.g.)	Stadium: Lower.com Field; Attendance: 20,562; Referee: Chris Penso; Assistant referees: Nick Uranga; Eduardo Jeff; Fourth official: Meghan Mullen

April 22 9	Charlotte FC	1–0	Columbus Crew	Charlotte, NC
7:30 PM EDT	Świderski 37'; Jones (yellow card) 45+4'	Report	Yeboah (yellow card) 75'	Stadium: Bank of America Stadium; Attendance: 30,468; Referee: Jon Freemon; Assistant referees: Kyle Atkins; Brian Dunn; Fourth official: Brian Poeschel

April 29 10	Columbus Crew	1–2	Inter Miami CF	Columbus, OH
7:30 PM EDT	Hernández 10'; Morris (yellow card) 26'	Report	Campana 7', 41'; Kryvtsov (yellow card) 22'; Cremaschi (yellow card) 49'; Taylor (yellow card) 84'	Stadium: Lower.com Field; Attendance: 20,410; Referee: Pierre-Luc Lauziere; Assistant referees: Logan Brown; Ryan Graves; Fourth official: Lukasz Szpala

May 13 11	Columbus Crew	2–2	Orlando City SC	Columbus, OH
7:30 PM EDT	Moreira (yellow card) 28'; Quinton (yellow card) 35'; Nagbe 39', (yellow card) 71'; Russell-Rowe 45+2'; Vallecilla (yellow card) 52'	Report	Carlos (yellow card) 14'; Kara 49'; Cartagena (yellow card) 73'; McGuire 90+2'	Stadium: Lower.com Field; Attendance: 20,488; Referee: Drew Fischer; Assistant referees: Kathryn Nesbitt; Chantal Boudreau; Fourth official: Brian Dunn

May 17 12	Columbus Crew	2–0	LA Galaxy	Columbus, OH
7:30 PM EDT	Zelarayán 25'; Amundsen 43'; Ramirez (yellow card) 46'	Report	Puig (yellow card) 82'; Hernández (yellow card) 88'	Stadium: Lower.com Field; Attendance: 20,192; Referee: Ted Unkel; Assistant referees: Cory Richardson; Meghan Mullen; Fourth official: Justin Howard

May 20 13	FC Cincinnati	3–2	Columbus Crew	Cincinnati, OH
7:30 PM EDT	Acosta 17', 23' (pen.); Miazga (yellow card) 63'; Moreno 67'	Report	40' Zelarayán; 52' (yellow card) 72' Amundsen	Stadium: TQL Stadium; Attendance: 25,513; Referee: Nima Saghafi; Assistant referees: Ian McKay; Matt Nelson; Fourth official: Filip Dujic

May 28 14	Nashville SC	3–1	Columbus Crew	Nashville, TN
8:30 PM EDT	McCarty (yellow card) 19'; Picault 56'; Moore (yellow card) 60'; Godoy (yellow card) 77'; Bunbury 80'; Mukhtar 90+7'	Report	Yeboah 2'; Vallecilla (yellow card) 5'; Morris (yellow card) 90'	Stadium: Geodis Park; Attendance: 30,109; Referee: Victor Rivas; Assistant referees: Logan Brown; Walter Heatherly; Fourth official: Kyle Atkins

May 31 15	Columbus Crew	3–2	Colorado Rapids	Columbus, OH
7:30 PM EDT	Zelarayán 37'; Zawadzki 62'; Hernández 72'; Schulte (yellow card) 86'	Report	Nicholson 9'; Bombito (yellow card) 74'; Bassett 90+5'	Stadium: Lower.com Field; Attendance: 20,223; Referee: Tori Penso; Assistant referees: Adam Garner; Nick Balcer; Fourth official: Joshua Encarnacion

June 3 16	Columbus Crew	4–2	Charlotte FC	Columbus, OH
7:30 PM EDT	Ramírez 5', 59'; Arfsten 21'; Hernández 43', (yellow card) 86'	Report	Sobociński (yellow card) 39'; Świderski 56'; Meram 58'; Byrne (yellow card) 78'; Jones (yellow card) 84'	Stadium: Lower.com Field; Attendance: 20,199; Referee: Alex Chilowicz; Assistant referees: Stefan Tanaka-Freundt; Claudiu Badea; Fourth official: Brandon Stevis

June 10 17	Chicago Fire FC	1–2	Columbus Crew	Chicago, IL
8:30 PM EDT	Navarro (yellow card) 45+5'; Shaqiri 88'; Herbers (yellow card) 89'	Report	Amundsen (yellow card) 20'; Zawadzki (yellow card) 29'; Hernández 59'; Farsi (yellow card) 81'; Zelarayán 90+3', (yellow card) 90+5'	Stadium: Soldier Field; Attendance: 18,892; Referee: Mark Allatin; Assistant referees: Chris Elliott; Mike Rottersman; Fourth official: Mathew Corrigan

June 17 18	New York City FC	1–1	Columbus Crew	New York, NY
3:30 PM EDT	Cufré (yellow card) 32'; Parks (yellow card) 90'; Segal 90+4'; Rodríguez (yellow card) 90+6'	Report	Ramírez 48'	Stadium: Yankee Stadium; Attendance: 30,615; Referee: Pierre-Luc Lauziere; Assistant referees: Oscar Mitchell-Carvalho; Peter Balciunas; Fourth official: Brandon Stevis

June 24 19	Columbus Crew	2–0	Nashville SC	Columbus, OH
7:30 PM EDT	Ramírez 20'; Moreira (yellow card) 59'; Maher 90+5' (o.g.)	Report	Mukhtar (yellow card) 60'	Stadium: Lower.com Field; Attendance: 20,443; Referee: Filip Dujic; Assistant referees: Ian McKay; Kevin Klinger; Fourth official: Alex Billeter

July 1 20	Columbus Crew	2–1	New York Red Bulls	Columbus, OH
7:30 PM EDT	Hernández 19'; Yeboah 62'; Schulte (yellow card) 63'; Zawadzki (yellow card) 72'	Report	Edelman (yellow card) 33'; Elias Manoel 38'; Amaya (yellow card) 82'; Coronel (yellow card) 90+5'	Stadium: Lower.com Field; Attendance: 20,415; Referee: Ismir Pekmic; Assistant referees: Andrew Bigelow; Jason White; Fourth official: Matthew Thompson

July 4 21	Inter Miami CF	2–2	Columbus Crew	Fort Lauderdale, FL
7:30 PM EDT	Campana 57'; Taylor (yellow card) 79'; Martínez 90'	Report	Nagbe 23', (yellow card) 90+2'; Arfsten (yellow card) 38'; Ramírez 69'	Stadium: DRV PNK Stadium; Attendance: 14,072; Referee: Alex Chilowicz; Assistant referees: Jose Da Silva; Claudiu Badea; Fourth official: Natalie Simon

July 8 22	Columbus Crew	1–1	New York City FC	Columbus, OH
7:30 PM EDT	Zelarayán (yellow card) 41'; Hernández (yellow card) 45+2' (yellow-red card) 68'; Amundsen (yellow card) 57'; Nagbe (yellow card) 64'; Zawadzki (yellow card) 85', (goal) 90+4'; Nancy (red card) 87'; Pizzuto (red card) 90'; Degenek (yellow card) 90+9'	Report	Barraza (yellow card) 13'; Rodríguez (yellow card) 68'; Haak 75', (yellow card) 90+12'; Cufré (yellow card) 90+8'	Stadium: Lower.com Field; Attendance: 20,533; Referee: Serhiy Boyko; Assistant referees: Jeremy Kieso; Justin Howard; Fourth official: Ricardo Fierro

July 15 23	Portland Timbers	3–2	Columbus Crew	Portland, OR
10:30 PM EDT	Asprilla 28', 30'; Loría (yellow card) 48'; Chará (yellow card) 54'; Blanco 80', (yellow card) 81'	Report	Zelarayán 45+3', 65'; Russell-Rowe (yellow card) 72'	Stadium: Providence Park; Attendance: 24,181; Referee: Timothy Ford; Assistant referees: Corey Parker; Walter Heatherly; Fourth official: Mark Allatin

August 20 24	Columbus Crew	3–0	FC Cincinnati	Columbus, OH
7:30 PM EDT	Morris 15'; Hernández 23' (pen.); Russell-Rowe 90+6'	Report	Nwobodo (yellow card) 45+2'; Arias (yellow card) 76'	Stadium: Lower.com Field; Attendance: 20,730; Referee: Ted Unkel; Assistant referees: Cory Richardson; Gianni Facchini; Fourth official: John Griggs

August 26 25	Columbus Crew	2–0	Toronto FC	Columbus, OH
7:30 PM EDT	Rossi 21'; Amundsen (yellow card) 24'; Russell-Rowe 89'	Report	O'Neill (yellow card) 44'	Stadium: Lower.com Field; Attendance: 20,548; Referee: Elton García; Assistant referees: Corey Rockwell; Cameron Blanchard; Fourth official: Fotis Bazakos

August 30 26	Houston Dynamo FC	2–0	Columbus Crew	Houston, TX
8:30 PM EDT	Baird 14'; Dorsey (yellow card) 58'; Carrasquilla (yellow card) 81'; Sviatchenko (yellow card) 87'; Ibrahim 90'	Report	Cheberko (yellow card) 4'; Zawadzki (yellow card) 71'	Stadium: Shell Energy Stadium; Attendance: 10,873; Referee: Jair Marrufo; Assistant referees: Kali Smith; Jeffrey Greeson; Fourth official: Nima Saghafi

September 2 27	CF Montréal	2–4	Columbus Crew	Montreal, QC
7:30 PM EDT	Jabang (yellow card) 18'; Opoku 52'; Vilsaint 68'; Miljevic (yellow card) 90+5'	Report	Corbo 14' (o.g.); Hernández 22', 43', 65' (pen.); Yeboah (yellow card) 29'; Amundsen (yellow card) 46'; Schulte (yellow card) 86'	Stadium: Saputo Stadium; Attendance: 18,358; Referee: Filip Dujic; Assistant referees: Lyes Arfa; Walter Heatherly; Fourth official: Michael Venne

September 16 28	Orlando City SC	4–3	Columbus Crew	Orlando, FL
7:30 PM EDT	Ojeda 48'; Torres 73'; Enrique 86', 90+7', (yellow card) 90+8'	Report	Gressel 16'; Rossi 56'; Hernández 68'; Morris (yellow card) 82'	Stadium: Exploria Stadium; Attendance: 22,802; Referee: Rubiel Vazquez; Assistant referees: Andrew Bigelow; Meghan Mullen; Fourth official: Malik Badawi

September 20 29	Columbus Crew	3–0	Chicago Fire FC	Columbus, OH
7:30 PM EDT	Hernández 8' (pen.), 16' (pen.), 23'	Report	Brady (yellow card) 8'; Souquet (yellow card) 13'; Czichos (yellow card) 33'; Shaqiri (yellow card) 44' (yellow-red card) 67'; Koutsias (yellow card) 72'; Przybyłko (yellow card) 74'	Stadium: Lower.com Field; Attendance: 20,349; Referee: Ismir Pekmic; Assistant referees: Claudiu Badea; Justin Howard; Fourth official: Marcos de Oliveira

September 23 30	FC Dallas	1–1	Columbus Crew	Frisco, TX
8:30 PM EDT	Obrain 43'; Arriola (yellow card) 59'; Illarramendi (yellow card) 85'	Report	Tafari 24' (o.g.); Zawadzki (yellow card) 52'; Camacho (yellow card) 60'	Stadium: Toyota Stadium; Attendance: 17,948; Referee: Tori Penso; Assistant referees: Lyes Arfa; Ryan Graves; Fourth official: Sergii Demianchuk

September 30 31	Columbus Crew	1–1	Philadelphia Union	Columbus, OH
7:30 PM EDT	Amundsen (yellow card) 67'; Hernández 72' (pen.), (yellow card) 84'	Report	Harriel 50'; Lowe (yellow card) 52'; Elliott (yellow card) 71'; Wagner (yellow card) 72'; Bueno (yellow card) 72'	Stadium: Lower.com Field; Attendance: 20,456; Referee: Jon Freemon; Assistant referees: Logan Brown; Oscar Mitchell-Carvalho; Fourth official: Thomas Snyder

October 4 32	New England Revolution	1–2	Columbus Crew	Foxborough, MA
7:30 PM EDT	Polster (yellow card) 45+2'; Chancalay 48'	Report	Rossi 20'; Amundsen (yellow card) 58', (goal) 86'; Nagbe (yellow card) 61'; Zawadzki (yellow card) 70'; Ramírez (yellow card) 90'	Stadium: Gillette Stadium; Attendance: 14,144; Referee: Alexis Da Silva; Assistant referees: Kyle Atkins; Jason White; Fourth official: Fotis Bazakos

October 7 33	Atlanta United FC	1–1	Columbus Crew	Atlanta, GA
7:30 PM EDT	Robinson 90+7'	Report	Hernández 65'	Stadium: Mercedes-Benz Stadium; Attendance: 42,684; Referee: Ismail Elfath; Assistant referees: Chris Elliott; Ben Pilgrim; Fourth official: Malik Badawi

October 21 34	Columbus Crew	2–1	CF Montréal	Columbus, OH
6:00 PM EDT	Hernández 17'; Nagbe 50'	Report	Ibrahim 7'; Piette (yellow card) 33'	Stadium: Lower.com Field; Attendance: 20,526; Referee: Drew Fischer; Assistant referees: Cory Richardson; Eric Weisbrod; Fourth official: Mathew Corrigan

=== MLS Cup Playoffs ===
==== Round One ====
November 1 Match 1	Columbus Crew	2–0	Atlanta United FC	Columbus, OH
7:30 PM EDT	Hernández 45+1', 51' (pen.); Camacho (yellow card) 78'; Rossi (yellow card) 79'	Report	Muyumba (yellow card) 25'; Robinson (yellow card) 71'; Thiaré (yellow card) 77'	Stadium: Lower.com Field; Attendance: 20,176; Referee: Lukasz Szpala; Assistant referees: Adam Wienckowski; Jason White; Fourth official: Filip Dujic

November 7 Match 2	Atlanta United FC	4–2	Columbus Crew	Atlanta, GA
7:00 PM EDT	Giakoumakis (yellow card) 18', (goal) 38'; Silva 45+4', (yellow card) 45+4'; Mosquera 83'; Almada 88'	Report	Hernández (yellow card) 41', (goal) 45'; Arfsten 90+5'	Stadium: Mercedes-Benz Stadium; Attendance: 41,850; Referee: Chris Penso; Assistant referees: Cameron Blanchard; Jeremy Hanson; Fourth official: Pierre-Luc Lauziere

November 12 Match 3	Columbus Crew	4–2	Atlanta United FC	Columbus, OH
7:00 PM EDT	Nagbe 9'; Amundsen 17', (yellow card) 73'; Mățan 33'; Rossi 47'; Camacho (yellow card) 71'	Report	Muyumba (yellow card) 27'; Giakoumakis 35'; Silva 50'; Fortune (yellow card) 81'; Thiaré (yellow card) 90'	Stadium: Lower.com Field; Attendance: 20,182; Referee: Armando Villarreal; Assistant referees: Corey Parker; Jose Da Silva; Fourth official: Tori Penso
Note: Columbus Crew won the series 2–1.

==== Conference Semifinals ====
November 25 Conference Semifinals	Orlando City SC	0–2 (a.e.t.)	Columbus Crew	Orlando, FL
5:30 PM EDT	Schlegel (yellow card) 17' (yellow-red card) 77'; Cartagena (yellow card) 55'; Araújo (yellow card) 71'; Jansson (yellow card) 95'; Þórhallsson (yellow card) 104'	Report	Camacho (yellow card) 27'; Amundsen (yellow card) 45+1'; Ramírez 93', (yellow card) 117'; Hernández 118', (yellow card) 119'	Stadium: Exploria Stadium; Attendance: 25,527; Referee: Jon Freemon; Assistant referees: Jeremy Hanson; Chantal Boudreau; Fourth official: Fotis Bazakos

==== Conference Finals ====
December 2 Conference Finals	FC Cincinnati	2–3 (a.e.t.)	Columbus Crew	Cincinnati, Ohio
6:00 PM EDT	Vázquez 14', (yellow card) 99'; Acosta 45+3', (yellow card) 73'; Badji (yellow card) 82'; Mosquera (yellow card) 117'	Report	Moreira (yellow card) 45+2'; Powell 75' (o.g.); Rossi 86'; Ramirez 115'; Gressel (yellow card) 120+1'	Stadium: TQL Stadium; Attendance: 25,513; Referee: Allen Chapman; Assistant referees: Corey Parker; Nick Uranga; Fourth official: Rosendo Mendoza

==== MLS Cup 2023 ====
December 9 MLS Cup	Columbus Crew	2–1	Los Angeles FC	Columbus, Ohio
4:00 PM EDT	Hernández 33' (pen.); Yeboah 37'; Amundsen (yellow card) 61'; Rossi (yellow card) 90'; Morris (yellow card) 90+3'	Report	Vela (yellow card) 49'; Tillman (yellow card) 53'; Sánchez (yellow card) 67'; Bouanga 74'; Palacios (yellow card) 85'	Stadium: Lower.com Field; Attendance: 20,802; Referee: Armando Villarreal; Assistant referees: Cameron Blanchard; Ian McKay; Fourth official: Jon Freemon

=== Leagues Cup ===
==== Group stage: Central 1 ====
Pos	Team	Pld	W	PW	PL	L	GF	GA	GD	Pts	Qualification	CLB	CAM	STL
1	(United States) Columbus Crew	2	2	0	0	0	6	2	+4	6	Advance to knockout stage	—	—	2–1
2	(Mexico) América	2	1	0	0	1	5	4	+1	3	Advance to knockout stage	1–4	—	4–0
3	(United States) St. Louis City SC	2	0	0	0	2	1	6	−5	0		—	—	—

Source: Leagues Cup
Rules for classification: Tiebreakers

July 23 Group Stage	Columbus Crew (United States)	2–1	(United States) St. Louis City SC	Columbus, OH
7:30 PM EDT	Zelarayán 11'; Hernández 29' (pen.); Cheberko (yellow card) 88'; Farsi (yellow card) 90+3'	Report	Adeniran (yellow card) 56'; Russell-Rowe 85' (o.g.); Pompeu (yellow card) 90+5'	Stadium: Lower.com Field; Attendance: 20,533; Referee: Reon Radix (Grenada); Assistant referees: Wasnah Barnarde (Antigua and Barbuda); Chris Cortez-Elliott (United States); Fourth official: Okeito Nicholson (Jamaica)

July 31 Group Stage	Columbus Crew (United States)	4–1	(Mexico) Club América	Columbus, OH
8:00 PM EDT	Hernández 41', 69' (pen.); Ramírez 81'; Moreira 90+3'	Report	Álvarez 29'	Stadium: Lower.com Field; Attendance: 20,217; Referee: Fernando Guerrero Ramírez (Mexico); Assistant referees: Pablo Israel Hernández (Mexico); Michel Ricardo Espinoza (Mexico); Fourth official: Melvin Matamoros (Honduras)

==== Knockout stage ====
August 4 Round of 32	Columbus Crew (United States)	3–3 (3–4 p)	(United States) Minnesota United FC	Columbus, OH
8:00 PM EDT	Cheberko (yellow card) 20'; Hernández (yellow card) 41'; Amundsen 42'; Mățan 51'; Nagbe (yellow card) 52'; Ramirez 83'	Report	Hlongwane 17', 54'; Boxall (yellow card) 45'; Trapp (yellow card) 79'; Dotson 90'	Stadium: Lower.com Field; Attendance: 20,217; Referee: Reon Radix (Grenada); Assistant referees: Caleb Wales (Trinidad and Tobago); Nicholas Anderson (Jamaica); Fourth official: Tristley Bassue (St. Kitts and Nevis)
	Penalties
	Hernández (penalty scored); Ramirez (penalty scored); Mățan (penalty scored); Molino (penalty missed); Moreira (penalty missed); Amundsen (penalty missed)		(penalty scored) Reynoso; (penalty scored) Rosales; (penalty scored) Boxall; (penalty missed) García; (penalty missed) Hlongwane; (penalty scored) Tapias

=== U.S. Open Cup ===
April 26 Third Round	Columbus Crew (MLS) (Ohio)	1–0	(Indiana) Indy Eleven (USLC)	Columbus, OH
7:30 PM EDT	Farsi 83'; Degenek (yellow card) 90+1'	Report	Vázquez (yellow card) 88'	Stadium: Lower.com Field; Attendance: 2,000; Referee: Nabil Bensalah; Assistant referees: Chris Schurfranz; Stephen Milhoan; Fourth official: Kevin Fikar

May 10 Round of 32	Loudoun United FC (USLC) (Virginia)	1–5	(Ohio) Columbus Crew (MLS)	Leesburg, VA
7:00 PM EDT	Samaké (red card) 10'; ElMedkhar 86' (pen.); Leggett (yellow card) 90+1'	Report	Yeboah 6'; Zawadzki 18'; Parente 24', 27'; Ramírez 36'; Morris (yellow card) 65'	Stadium: Segra Field; Attendance: 3,201; Referee: Luis Arroyo; Assistant referees: Adam Wienckowski; Jeremy Smith; Fourth official: Gary Gutiérrez

May 24 Round of 16	Pittsburgh Riverhounds SC (USLC) (Pennsylvania)	1–0	(Ohio) Columbus Crew (MLS)	Pittsburgh, PA
7:00 PM EDT	Dikwa 22'; Griffin (yellow card) 62'; Kizza (red card) 90+5'	Report	Hughes (yellow card) 90+3'	Stadium: Highmark Stadium; Attendance: 6,107; Referee: Jeremy Scheer; Assistant referees: Jason White; Jacob Little; Fourth official: Luis Arroyo

== Statistics ==
=== Appearances and goals ===
Under "Apps" for each section, the first number represents the number of starts, and the second number represents appearances as a substitute.

No.	Pos	Nat	Player	Total		MLS		MLS Cup Playoffs		U.S. Open Cup		Leagues Cup	
No.	Pos	Nat	Player	Apps	Goals	Apps	Goals	Apps	Goals	Apps	Goals	Apps	Goals
2	DF	(United States) USA	Philip Quinton	15	1	10+2	1	0+0	0	3+0	0	0+0	0
3	DF	(United States) USA	Josh Williams	0	0	0+0	0	0+0	0	0+0	0	0+0	0
4	DF	(France) FRA	Rudy Camacho	17	0	8+3	0	6+0	0	0+0	0	0+0	0
6	MF	(United States) USA	Darlington Nagbe	44	4	32+2	3	6+0	1	1+0	0	3+0	0
7	MF	(United States) USA	Julian Gressel	17	1	9+2	1	2+2	0	0+0	0	1+1	0
8	MF	(United States) USA	Aidan Morris	41	4	30+0	4	6+0	0	0+2	0	3+0	0
9	FW	(Colombia) COL	Cucho Hernández	37	24	27+0	16	6+0	5	1+0	0	3+0	3
10	FW	(Uruguay) URU	Diego Rossi	16	5	8+2	3	6+0	2	0+0	0	0+0	0
12	DF	(Ecuador) ECU	Gustavo Vallecilla	16	0	10+2	0	0+0	0	2+0	0	1+1	0
13	FW	(Trinidad and Tobago) TTO	Kevin Molino	16	0	0+9	0	0+5	0	0+0	0	0+2	0
14	MF	(Ghana) GHA	Yaw Yeboah	42	5	22+9	3	5+1	1	2+0	1	2+1	0
16	MF	(United States) USA	Isaiah Parente	10	2	0+7	0	0+0	0	3+0	2	0+0	0
17	FW	(United States) USA	Christian Ramirez	40	13	19+11	8	0+5	2	2+0	1	3+0	2
18	DF	(Denmark) DEN	Malte Amundsen	33	5	21+1	3	6+0	1	1+1	0	3+0	1
19	FW	(Canada) CAN	Jacen Russell-Rowe	28	4	4+17	4	0+2	0	2+1	0	0+2	0
20	MF	(Romania) ROU	Alexandru Mățan	40	3	27+4	1	6+0	1	0+1	0	2+0	1
21	DF	(Ukraine) UKR	Yevhen Cheberko	12	0	2+4	0	3+0	0	0+0	0	1+2	0
22	DF	(United States) USA	Keegan Hughes	3	0	0+1	0	0+0	0	1+1	0	0+0	0
23	DF	(Algeria) ALG	Mohamed Farsi	42	1	23+8	0	4+1	0	1+2	1	2+1	0
24	GK	(United States) USA	Evan Bush	5	0	0+0	0	0+0	0	3+0	0	2+0	0
25	MF	(United States) USA	Sean Zawadzki	42	4	15+15	3	1+5	0	3+0	1	3+0	0
27	FW	(United States) USA	Maximilian Arfsten	17	3	3+9	2	0+1	1	3+0	0	0+1	0
28	GK	(United States) USA	Patrick Schulte	38	0	31+0	0	6+0	0	0+0	0	1+0	0
30	MF	(United States) USA	Will Sands	7	0	7+0	0	0+0	0	0+0	0	0+0	0
31	DF	(Cape Verde) CPV	Steven Moreira	43	1	33+1	0	6+0	0	1+0	0	2+0	1
32	GK	(United States) USA	Brady Scott	0	0	0+0	0	0+0	0	0+0	0	0+0	0
33	DF	(United States) USA	Jake Morris	2	0	0+0	0	0+0	0	0+2	0	0+0	0
94	DF	(Colombia) COL	Jimmy Medranda	12	1	0+10	1	0+0	0	1+1	0	0+0	0
			Own goal	0	5	-	4	-	1	-	0	-	0
Players who left Columbus during the season:
1	GK	(Curaçao) CUW	Eloy Room	3	0	3+0	0	0+0	0	0+0	0	0+0	0
5	DF	(Australia) AUS	Miloš Degenek	13	0	10+2	0	0+0	0	1+0	0	0+0	0
10	MF	(Armenia) ARM	Lucas Zelarayán	21	11	20+0	10	0+0	0	0+0	0	1+0	1
11	MF	(Costa Rica) CRC	Luis Díaz	4	0	0+4	0	0+0	0	0+0	0	0+0	0
37	FW	(United States) USA	Gibran Rayo	1	0	0+0	0	0+0	0	0+1	0	0+0	0
38	FW	(United States) USA	Noah Fuson	1	0	0+0	0	0+0	0	0+1	0	0+0	0
39	MF	(United States) USA	Thomas Roberts	2	0	0+0	0	0+0	0	2+0	0	0+0	0
52	MF	(United States) USA	Taha Habroune	1	0	0+0	0	0+0	0	0+1	0	0+0	0

=== Disciplinary record ===
No.	Pos.	Name	MLS		MLS Cup Playoffs		U.S. Open Cup		Leagues Cup		Total	
No.	Pos.	Name	Booked	Sent off (straight red)	Booked	Sent off (straight red)	Booked	Sent off (straight red)	Booked	Sent off (straight red)	Booked	Sent off (straight red)
2	DF	(United States) Philip Quinton	2	0	0	0	0	0	0	0	2	0
3	DF	(United States) Josh Williams	0	0	0	0	0	0	0	0	0	0
4	DF	(France) Rudy Camacho	1	0	3	0	0	0	0	0	4	0
6	MF	(United States) Darlington Nagbe	4	0	0	0	0	0	1	0	5	0
7	MF	(United States) Julian Gressel	0	0	1	0	0	0	0	0	1	0
8	MF	(United States) Aidan Morris	5	0	1	0	0	0	0	0	6	0
9	FW	(Colombia) Cucho Hernández	5	1	2	0	0	0	1	0	8	1
10	FW	(Uruguay) Diego Rossi	0	0	2	0	0	0	0	0	2	0
12	DF	(Ecuador) Gustavo Vallecilla	3	0	0	0	0	0	0	0	3	0
13	FW	(Trinidad and Tobago) Kevin Molino	0	0	0	0	0	0	0	0	0	0
14	MF	(Ghana) Yaw Yeboah	3	0	0	0	0	0	0	0	3	0
16	MF	(United States) Isaiah Parente	0	0	0	0	0	0	0	0	0	0
17	FW	(United States) Christian Ramirez	2	0	1	0	0	0	0	0	3	0
18	DF	(Denmark) Malte Amundsen	8	0	3	0	0	0	0	0	11	0
19	FW	(United States) Jacen Russell-Rowe	2	0	0	0	0	0	0	0	2	0
20	MF	(Ghana) Alexandru Mățan	2	0	0	0	0	0	0	0	2	0
21	DF	(Ukraine) Yevhen Cheberko	1	0	0	0	0	0	2	0	1	0
22	DF	(United States) Keegan Hughes	0	0	0	0	1	0	0	0	1	0
23	DF	(United States) Mohamed Farsi	1	0	0	0	0	0	1	0	2	0
24	GK	(United States) Evan Bush	0	0	0	0	0	0	0	0	0	0
25	MF	(United States) Sean Zawadzki	6	0	0	0	0	0	0	0	6	0
27	FW	(United States) Maximilian Arfsten	1	0	0	0	0	0	0	0	1	0
28	GK	(United States) Patrick Schulte	3	0	0	0	0	0	0	0	3	0
30	MF	(United States) Will Sands	1	0	0	0	0	0	0	0	1	0
31	DF	(Cape Verde) Steven Moreira	2	0	1	0	0	0	0	0	3	0
32	GK	(United States) Brady Scott	0	0	0	0	0	0	0	0	0	0
33	DF	(United States) Jake Morris	0	0	0	0	1	0	0	0	1	0
94	DF	(Colombia) Jimmy Medranda	1	0	0	0	0	0	0	0	1	0
-	HC	(France) Wilfried Nancy	0	1	0	0	0	0	0	0	0	1
-	AC	(Portugal) Federico Pizzuto	0	1	0	0	0	0	0	0	0	1
Players who left Columbus during the season:
1	GK	(Curaçao) Eloy Room	0	0	0	0	0	0	0	0	0	0
5	DF	(Australia) Miloš Degenek	3	0	0	0	1	0	0	0	4	0
10	MF	(Armenia) Lucas Zelarayán	4	0	0	0	0	0	0	0	4	0
11	MF	(Costa Rica) Luis Díaz	0	0	0	0	0	0	0	0	0	0
37	FW	(United States) Gibran Rayo	0	0	0	0	0	0	0	0	0	0
38	FW	(United States) Noah Fuson	0	0	0	0	0	0	0	0	0	0
39	MF	(United States) Thomas Roberts	0	0	0	0	0	0	0	0	0	0
52	MF	(United States) Taha Habroune	0	0	0	0	0	0	0	0	0	0

=== Clean sheets ===
No.	Name	MLS	MLS Cup Playoffs	U.S. Open Cup	Leagues Cup	Total	Games Played
24	(United States) Evan Bush	0	0	1	0	1	5
28	(United States) Patrick Schulte	7	2	0	0	9	38
32	(United States) Brady Scott	0	0	0	0	0	0
Players who left Columbus during the season:
1	(Curaçao) Eloy Room	1	0	0	0	1	3

== Transfers ==
=== In ===
Pos.	Player	Transferred from	Fee/notes	Date	Source
DF	(United States) Keegan Hughes	(United States) Stanford Cardinal	Homegrown player, contract runs through 2024 with options through 2026	January 11, 2023	
FW	(United States) Christian Ramirez	(Scotland) Aberdeen F.C.	Transfer for an undisclosed fee, contract runs through 2024 with an option for 2025	January 19, 2023	
DF	(United States) Philip Quinton	(United States) Columbus Crew 2	Signed from MLS Next Pro team, contract runs through 2023 with options through 2026	February 8, 2023	
FW	(United States) Maximilian Arfsten	(United States) San Jose Earthquakes II	Signed via the SuperDraft, contract runs through 2024 with options for 2025 and 2026	February 21, 2023	
DF	(Denmark) Malte Amundsen	(United States) New York City FC	Trade for $400,000 in general allocation money with a potential $100,000 in performance-based additions, contract runs through 2024 with an option for 2025	April 25, 2023	
DF	(Ukraine) Yevhen Cheberko	(Croatia) NK Osijek	Transfer for an undisclosed fee, contract runs through 2026	June 9, 2023	
MF	(United States) Julian Gressel	(Canada) Vancouver Whitecaps FC	Trade for $550,000 in general allocation money across the 2023 and 2024 seasons, including a conditional fee of $300,000	July 21, 2023	
DF	(France) Rudy Camacho	(Canada) CF Montréal	Trade for $400,000 in general allocation money total, $200,000 in 2023 and $200,000 in 2024	July 31, 2023	
FW	(Uruguay) Diego Rossi	(Turkey) Fenerbahçe	Transfer for $5,630,000 with a $1,000,000 bonus fee and a 15% sell-on clause, contract runs through 2026 with an option for 2027	August 2, 2023	
MF	(United States) Derrick Jones	(United States) Charlotte FC	Free agent, contract runs through 2025 with an option for 2026	December 21, 2023	
GK	(Guatemala) Nicholas Hagen	(Israel) Bnei Sakhnin F.C.	Free agent, contract runs through 2024 with options through 2026	December 21, 2023	
MF	(Colombia) Marino Hinestroza	(Mexico) C.F. Pachuca	Transfer, undisclosed transfer fee. Contract runs through 2026 with an option for 2027	December 22, 2023	

=== Loan in ===
Pos.	Player	Parent club	Length/Notes	Beginning	End	Source
DF	(Ecuador) Gustavo Vallecilla	(United States) Colorado Rapids	$175,000 in General Allocation Money, on loan through 2023 season with option to purchase	March 3, 2023	December 9, 2023	
MF	(United States) Thomas Roberts	(United States) Columbus Crew 2	Short-term agreements	May 10, 2023	May 10, 2023	
MF	(United States) Thomas Roberts	(United States) Columbus Crew 2	Short-term agreements	May 24, 2023	May 24, 2023	
FW	(United States) Noah Fuson	(United States) Columbus Crew 2	Short-term agreements	March 4, 2023	March 4, 2023	
FW	(United States) Noah Fuson	(United States) Columbus Crew 2	Short-term agreements	May 10, 2023	May 10, 2023	
FW	(United States) Gibran Rayo	(United States) Columbus Crew 2	Short-term agreements	May 24, 2023	May 24, 2023	
FW	(United States) Gibran Rayo	(United States) Columbus Crew 2	Short-term agreements	May 31, 2023	May 31, 2023	
FW	(United States) Gibran Rayo	(United States) Columbus Crew 2	Short-term agreements	June 3, 2023	June 3, 2023	
MF	(United States) Taha Habroune	(United States) Columbus Crew 2	Short-term agreement	May 24, 2023	May 24, 2023	

=== Out ===
Pos.	Player	Transferred to	Fee/notes	Date	Source
DF	(Ghana) Jonathan Mensah	(United States) San Jose Earthquakes	Traded for $200,000 in General Allocation Money, and potentially an additional $300,000 if certain performance metrics are met	February 10, 2023	
GK	(Curaçao) Eloy Room	(Netherlands) SBV Vitesse	Mutual consent termination	July 17, 2023	
DF	(Australia) Miloš Degenek	(Serbia) Red Star Belgrade	Transfer, undisclosed transfer fee.	July 24, 2023	
MF	(Armenia) Lucas Zelarayán	(Saudi Arabia) Al Fateh SC	Transfer, undisclosed transfer fee.	July 31, 2023	
MF	(Costa Rica) Luis Díaz	(United States) Colorado Rapids	Placed on waivers	September 5, 2023	
GK	(United States) Brady Scott	(United States) LA Galaxy	Option declined	December 12, 2023	
DF	(Colombia) Jimmy Medranda	(Colombia) Deportivo Cali	Option declined	December 12, 2023	
DF	(United States) Jake Morris	(United States) Louisville City FC	Option declined	December 12, 2023	
MF	(United States) Isaiah Parente	(United States) Ventura County FC	Option declined	December 12, 2023	
DF	(Ecuador) Gustavo Vallecilla	(United States) Colorado Rapids	Loan expired	December 12, 2023	
DF	(United States) Josh Williams	Retired	Out of contract	December 12, 2023	
MF	(United States) Julian Gressel	(United States) Inter Miami CF	Out of contract	December 12, 2023	

=== Loans out ===
Pos.	Player	Loanee club	Length/Notes	Beginning	End	Source
GK	(United States) Brady Scott	(United States) Columbus Crew 2	First team loan to affiliate	March 26, 2023	September 8, 2023	
DF	(United States) Jake Morris	(United States) Columbus Crew 2	First team loan to affiliate	April 9, 2023	June 18, 2023	
FW	(United States) Maximilian Arfsten	(United States) Columbus Crew 2	First team loan to affiliate	April 16, 2023	April 16, 2023	
DF	(Colombia) Jimmy Medranda	(United States) Columbus Crew 2	First team loan to affiliate	April 16, 2023	April 16, 2023	
DF	(United States) Keegan Hughes	(United States) Columbus Crew 2	First team loan to affiliate	April 16, 2023	July 25, 2023	
FW	(Canada) Jacen Russell-Rowe	(United States) Columbus Crew 2	First team loan to affiliate	April 16, 2023	April 16, 2023	
MF	(United States) Sean Zawadzki	(United States) Columbus Crew 2	First team loan to affiliate	April 16, 2023	April 16, 2023	
MF	(Ghana) Yaw Yeboah	(United States) Columbus Crew 2	First team loan to affiliate	April 16, 2023	April 16, 2023	
MF	(United States) Isaiah Parente	(United States) Columbus Crew 2	First team loan to affiliate	April 16, 2023	September 3, 2023	
DF	(United States) Philip Quinton	(United States) Columbus Crew 2	First team loan to affiliate	April 16, 2023	October 1, 2023	
DF	(Denmark) Malte Amundsen	(United States) Columbus Crew 2	First team loan to affiliate	April 30, 2023	April 30, 2023	
FW	(Trinidad and Tobago) Kevin Molino	(United States) Columbus Crew 2	First team loan to affiliate	June 4, 2023	June 4, 2023	
MF	(Costa Rica) Luis Díaz	(United States) Columbus Crew 2	First team loan to affiliate	June 4, 2023	June 11, 2023	
FW	(United States) Josh Williams	(United States) Columbus Crew 2	First team loan to affiliate	June 25, 2023	June 25, 2023	
DF	(United States) Jake Morris	(United States) Loudoun United	On loan through the end of the 2023 season	June 27, 2023	November 12, 2023	
DF	(United States) Keegan Hughes	(United States) FC Tulsa	On loan through the end of the 2023 season	August 4, 2023	November 12, 2023	

=== MLS Draft picks ===
Draft picks are not automatically signed to the team roster. Only those who are signed to a contract will be listed as transfers in. The picks for Columbus Crew are listed below:

2023 Columbus Crew SuperDraft Picks
Round	Pick	Player	Position	College/Team
1	14	(United States) Maximilian Arfsten	FW	San Jose Earthquakes II
1	27	(United States) Xavier Zengue	DF	Dayton
2	43	(United States) Clay Holstad	MF	Kentucky

== Awards ==
MLS Team of the Matchday
Matchday	Starters	Bench	Opponent(s)	Link
2		(Armenia) Lucas Zelarayán	(United States) D.C. United	
3		(United States) Aidan Morris	(Canada) Toronto FC	
5	(United States) Will Sands (United States) Christian Ramirez	(United States) Aidan Morris	(United States) Atlanta United FC	
6	(Armenia) Lucas Zelarayán (United States) Aidan Morris (France) Wilfried Nancy (Coach)		(United States) Real Salt Lake	
7	(Algeria) Mohamed Farsi	(Armenia) Lucas Zelarayán	(United States) D.C. United	
8		(United States) Patrick Schulte	(United States) New England Revolution	
10		(Armenia) Lucas Zelarayán	(United States) Inter Miami CF	
12		(United States) Darlington Nagbe	(United States) Orlando City SC	
13	(Denmark) Malte Amundsen		(United States) LA Galaxy	
16	(Armenia) Lucas Zelarayán (Colombia) Cucho Hernández		(United States) Colorado Rapids	
17	(United States) Christian Ramirez	(Armenia) Lucas Zelarayán (Colombia) Cucho Hernández	(United States) Charlotte FC	
18		(United States) Aidan Morris (Colombia) Cucho Hernández	(United States) Chicago Fire FC	
19		(Romania) Alexandru Mățan (United States) Christian Ramirez	(United States) New York City FC	
21		(Armenia) Lucas Zelarayán	(United States) Nashville SC	
22	(Ghana) Yaw Yeboah	(Colombia) Cucho Hernández	(United States) New York Red Bulls	
23	(United States) Darlington Nagbe	(Colombia) Cucho Hernández	(United States) Inter Miami CF	
24	(United States) Patrick Schulte		(United States) New York City FC	
26		(Armenia) Lucas Zelarayán	(United States) Portland Timbers	
27	(United States) Aidan Morris	(Colombia) Cucho Hernández	(United States) FC Cincinnati	
28		(United States) Julian Gressel	(Canada) Toronto FC	
30	(Colombia) Cucho Hernández		(Canada) CF Montréal	
32		(Colombia) Cucho Hernández	(United States) Orlando City SC	
33	(Colombia) Cucho Hernández		(United States) Chicago Fire FC	
36	(Denmark) Malte Amundsen	(Uruguay) Diego Rossi	(United States) New England Revolution	
37		(Colombia) Cucho Hernández	(United States) Atlanta United FC	
38	(United States) Darlington Nagbe	(Cape Verde) Steven Moreira	(Canada) CF Montréal	

=== MLS Player of the Matchday ===
Week	Player	Opponent	Link
2	(Armenia) Lucas Zelarayán	D.C. United	
30	(Colombia) Cucho Hernández	CF Montréal	
MLS Cup	(Colombia) Cucho Hernández	Los Angeles FC	

=== MLS Goal of the Matchday ===
Week	Player	Opponent	Link
18	(Armenia) Lucas Zelarayán	Chicago Fire FC	

=== MLS Player of the Month ===
Month	Player	Stats	Link
September	(Colombia) Cucho Hernández	8 goals, 1 assist	

=== 2023 MLS All-Star Game ===
Reserves

- MF Lucas Zelarayán
- MF Aidan Morris

=== 2023 MLS Next All-Star Game ===
- MF Taha Habroune
- MF Cole Mrowka

=== Postseason ===
Academy of the Year
Ticket Sales Initiative of the Year

=== Crew Team Awards ===
- Most Valuable Player – Cucho Hernández
- Golden Boot Winner – Cucho Hernández
- Defender of the Year – Steven Moreira
- Kirk Urso Heart Award – Malte Amundsen
- Humanitarian of the Year – Darlington Nagbe
- Crew 2 Player of the Year – Noah Fuson
- Academy Player of the Year – Gio De Libera
