= 2024 Leagues Cup =

Soccer tournament held in Canada and the United States

Tournament details
- Host countries: Canada; United States
- Dates: July 26 – August 25
- Teams: 47 (from 3 associations)
- Venues: 32 (in 31 host cities)

Final positions
- Champions: (United States) Columbus Crew (1st title)
- Runners-up: (United States) Los Angeles FC
- Third place: (United States) Colorado Rapids
- Fourth place: (United States) Philadelphia Union

Tournament statistics
- Matches played: 77
- Goals scored: 227 (2.95 per match)
- Top scorer(s): (Israel) Tai Baribo (7 goals)
- Best player: (Colombia) Cucho Hernández
- Best goalkeeper: (United States) Zack Steffen

The 2024 Leagues Cup was the fourth edition of the Leagues Cup, an international club soccer tournament contested by Major League Soccer (MLS) and Liga MX clubs in North America. It was held from July 26 to August 25, 2024, with all 77 matches played in Canada and the United States.

Columbus Crew won the tournament after defeating Los Angeles FC in the final at Lower.com Field in Columbus, Ohio. The three highest-placing teams qualified for the 2025 CONCACAF Champions Cup, with Columbus Crew qualifying directly to the tournament's round of 16 stage.

The groups and format for the 2024 edition were announced on January 31. Unlike the 2023 edition, only two regions were used for the tournament's group stage, divided into eight groups in the West and seven in the East. The 45 teams in the group stage were seeded in a combined table based on the 2023 regular season for MLS teams and most recent 34 matches in the Clausura and Apertura for Liga MX teams. Seeding for the group stage was divided into three pots (named "tiers") with geographical balance also considered. MLS Cup 2023 champions Columbus Crew and the top Liga MX team by aggregate points in 2023, América, both earned a bye to the round of 32.

All matches were played in Canada and United States at MLS venues. The top four teams in the Liga MX table used for seeding (América, Monterrey, Guadalajara, and UANL) had hub privileges that allowed them to be the designated home team in certain rounds. The predetermined venues for the hubs were announced on March 14, 2024.

Inter Miami were defending champions, but failed to defend the title after being eliminated by Columbus Crew in the round of 16; Columbus Crew went on to win the tournament for the first time.

== Teams ==
=== Draw ===
For the 2024 edition of the Leagues Cup, the 45 teams participating in the group stage were drawn into groups based on a combined ranking that used the 2023 Supporters' Shield table for MLS teams and the most recent 34 matches in the 2023 Clausura and Apertura seasons for Liga MX teams. These teams were divided into three pots from which the groups were drawn.

==== Seeding ====
Pot 1
Team	Rank
(Mexico) América	Bye
(Mexico) Monterrey	1
(United States) FC Cincinnati	2
(United States) Orlando City SC	3
(Mexico) Guadalajara	4
(United States) Columbus Crew	Bye
(United States) St. Louis City SC	5
(Mexico) UANL	6
(United States) Philadelphia Union	7
(United States) New England Revolution	8
(Mexico) Toluca	9
(Mexico) León	10
(United States) Seattle Sounders FC	11
(Mexico) Pachuca	12
(United States) Los Angeles FC	13
(United States) Houston Dynamo FC	14
(United States) Atlanta United FC	15

Pot 2
Team	Rank
(United States) Real Salt Lake	16
(United States) Nashville SC	17
(Canada) Vancouver Whitecaps FC	18
(United States) FC Dallas	19
(Mexico) UNAM	20
(Mexico) Puebla	21
(United States) Sporting Kansas City	22
(United States) San Jose Earthquakes	23
(United States) New York Red Bulls	24
(United States) Charlotte FC	25
(United States) Portland Timbers	26
(Mexico) Atlético San Luis	27
(Mexico) Santos Laguna	28
(United States) New York City FC	29
(United States) Minnesota United FC	30

Pot 3
Team	Rank
(Mexico) Cruz Azul	31
(Canada) CF Montréal	32
(United States) D.C. United	33
(United States) Chicago Fire FC	34
(United States) Austin FC	35
(Mexico) Querétaro	36
(Mexico) Atlas	37
(Mexico) Tijuana	38
(United States) LA Galaxy	39
(United States) Inter Miami CF	40
(Mexico) Juárez	41
(Mexico) Necaxa	42
(Mexico) Mazatlán	43
(United States) Colorado Rapids	44
(Canada) Toronto FC	45

Teams receiving bye to knockout stage.

== Group stage ==
The top four Liga MX clubs had "hub rights" that allowed them to host in a fixed region with priority over most MLS teams:

- América played in California starting at Snapdragon Stadium in San Diego in the round of 32; hub privilege lasted through the semifinals.
- Monterrey played in Texas with both group games at Q2 Stadium in Austin; hub privilege lasted through the round of 16.
- Guadalajara played in California starting at Levi's Stadium in Santa Clara; hub privilege lasted through the round of 32.
- UANL played in Texas starting at Shell Energy Stadium in Houston; hub privilege lasted for group stage games only.

=== East ===
East 1
East 2
East 3

Pos	Team	Pld	Pts
1	(United States Soccer Federation) FC Cincinnati	2	6
2	(United States Soccer Federation) New York City FC	2	2
3	(Mexican Football Federation) Querétaro	2	1

Source: Leagues Cup

Pos	Team	Pld	Pts
1	(United States Soccer Federation) Orlando City SC	2	5
2	(Canadian Soccer Association) CF Montréal	2	3
3	(Mexican Football Federation) Atlético San Luis	2	1

Source: Leagues Cup

Pos	Team	Pld	Pts
1	(Mexican Football Federation) UANL	2	6
2	(United States Soccer Federation) Inter Miami CF	2	3
3	(Mexican Football Federation) Puebla	2	0

Source: Leagues Cup
East 4
East 5
East 6

Pos	Team	Pld	Pts
1	(United States Soccer Federation) Philadelphia Union	2	4
2	(Mexican Football Federation) Cruz Azul	2	3
3	(United States Soccer Federation) Charlotte FC	2	2

Source: Leagues Cup

Pos	Team	Pld	Pts
1	(United States Soccer Federation) New England Revolution	2	5
2	(Mexican Football Federation) Mazatlán	2	3
3	(United States Soccer Federation) Nashville SC	2	1

Source: Leagues Cup

Pos	Team	Pld	Pts
1	(Canadian Soccer Association) Toronto FC	2	5
2	(Mexican Football Federation) Pachuca	2	2
3	(United States Soccer Federation) New York Red Bulls	2	2

Source: Leagues Cup
East 7

Pos	Team	Pld	Pts
1	(United States Soccer Federation) D.C. United	2	5
2	(Mexican Football Federation) Santos Laguna	2	2
3	(United States Soccer Federation) Atlanta United FC	2	2

Source: Leagues Cup

=== West ===
West 1
West 2
West 3

Pos	Team	Pld	Pts
1	(United States Soccer Federation) Austin FC	2	6
2	(Mexican Football Federation) UNAM	2	2
3	(Mexican Football Federation) Monterrey	2	1

Source: Leagues Cup

Pos	Team	Pld	Pts
1	(United States Soccer Federation) LA Galaxy	2	5
2	(United States Soccer Federation) San Jose Earthquakes	2	2
3	(Mexican Football Federation) Guadalajara	2	2

Source: Leagues Cup

Pos	Team	Pld	Pts
1	(Mexican Football Federation) Juárez	2	5
2	(United States Soccer Federation) St. Louis City SC	2	4
3	(United States Soccer Federation) FC Dallas	2	0

Source: Leagues Cup
West 4
West 5
West 6

Pos	Team	Pld	Pts
1	(Mexican Football Federation) Toluca	2	6
2	(United States Soccer Federation) Sporting Kansas City	2	3
3	(United States Soccer Federation) Chicago Fire FC	2	0

Source: Leagues Cup

Pos	Team	Pld	Pts
1	(United States Soccer Federation) Portland Timbers	2	6
2	(United States Soccer Federation) Colorado Rapids	2	2
3	(Mexican Football Federation) León	2	1

Source: Leagues Cup

Pos	Team	Pld	Pts
1	(Mexican Football Federation) Necaxa	2	3
2	(United States Soccer Federation) Seattle Sounders FC	2	3
3	(United States Soccer Federation) Minnesota United FC	2	3

Source: Leagues Cup
West 7
West 8

Pos	Team	Pld	Pts
1	(Canadian Soccer Association) Vancouver Whitecaps FC	2	5
2	(United States Soccer Federation) Los Angeles FC	2	4
3	(Mexican Football Federation) Tijuana	2	0

Source: Leagues Cup

Pos	Team	Pld	Pts
1	(United States Soccer Federation) Houston Dynamo FC	2	3
2	(Mexican Football Federation) Atlas	2	3
3	(United States Soccer Federation) Real Salt Lake	2	3

Source: Leagues Cup

== Knockout stage ==
=== Bracket ===
Round of 32
August 9 – San Diego, CA
(Mexico) América	2
(Mexico) Atlas	1
August 9 – St. Louis, MO
(United States) St. Louis City SC	3
(United States) Portland Timbers	1
August 9 – Houston, TX
(Mexico) Toluca (p)	2 (5)
(United States) Houston Dynamo FC	2 (4)
August 9 – Commerce City, CO
(Mexico) Juárez	2
(United States) Colorado Rapids	3
August 8 – Seattle, WA
(United States) LA Galaxy	1
(United States) Seattle Sounders FC	3
August 7 – Vancouver, BC
(Mexico) UNAM	2
(Canada) Vancouver Whitecaps FC	0
August 7 – Los Angeles, CA
(United States) Los Angeles FC	2
(United States) Austin FC	0
August 8 – San Jose, CA
(Mexico) Necaxa	0
(United States) San Jose Earthquakes	5
August 9 – Cincinnati, OH
(United States) FC Cincinnati (p)	1 (6)
(Mexico) Santos Laguna	1 (5)
August 9 – Chester, PA
(Canada) CF Montréal	0
(United States) Philadelphia Union	2
August 9 – Washington, D.C.
(United States) D.C. United	1
(Mexico) Mazatlán	2
August 9 – Orlando, FL
(Mexico) Cruz Azul (p)	0 (5)
(United States) Orlando City SC	0 (4)
August 8 – Austin, TX
(Mexico) UANL	1
(Mexico) Pachuca	0
August 9 – Foxborough, MA
(United States) New York City FC (p)	1 (7)
(United States) New England Revolution	1 (6)
August 9 – Columbus, OH
(United States) Sporting Kansas City	0
(United States) Columbus Crew	4
August 8 – Fort Lauderdale, FL
(Canada) Toronto FC	3
(United States) Inter Miami CF	4

Round of 16
August 13 – Carson, CA
(Mexico) América	4
(United States) St. Louis City SC	2
August 13 – Commerce City, CO
(Mexico) Toluca	1
(United States) Colorado Rapids	2
August 12 – Seattle, WA
(United States) Seattle Sounders FC	4
(Mexico) UNAM	0
August 13 – Los Angeles, CA
(United States) Los Angeles FC	4
(United States) San Jose Earthquakes	1
August 13 – Cincinnati, OH
(United States) FC Cincinnati	2
(United States) Philadelphia Union	4
August 13 – Washington, D.C.
(Mexico) Mazatlán (p)	2 (3)
(Mexico) Cruz Azul	2 (1)
August 13 – Harrison, NJ
(Mexico) UANL	1
(United States) New York City FC	2
August 13 – Columbus, OH
(United States) Columbus Crew	3
(United States) Inter Miami CF	2

Quarterfinals
August 17 – Carson, CA
(Mexico) América	0 (8)
(United States) Colorado Rapids (p)	0 (9)
August 17 – Seattle, WA
(United States) Seattle Sounders FC	0
(United States) Los Angeles FC	3
August 17 – Chester, PA
(United States) Philadelphia Union (p)	1 (4)
(Mexico) Mazatlán	1 (3)
August 17 – Columbus, OH
(United States) New York City FC	1 (3)
(United States) Columbus Crew (p)	1 (4)

Semifinals
August 21 – Los Angeles, CA
(United States) Colorado Rapids	0
(United States) Los Angeles FC	4
August 21 – Columbus, OH
(United States) Philadelphia Union	1
(United States) Columbus Crew	3

Final
August 25 – Columbus, OH
(United States) Los Angeles FC	1
(United States) Columbus Crew	3
Third place playoff
August 25 – Chester, PA
(United States) Colorado Rapids (p)	2 (3)
(United States) Philadelphia Union	2 (1)

=== Round of 32 ===
Team 1	Score	Team 2
Los Angeles FC (United States)	2–0	(United States) Austin FC
Vancouver Whitecaps FC (Canada)	0–2	(Mexico) UNAM
Inter Miami CF (United States)	4–3	(Canada) Toronto FC
UANL (Mexico)	1–0	(Mexico) Pachuca
Seattle Sounders FC (United States)	3–1	(United States) LA Galaxy
San Jose Earthquakes (United States)	5–0	(Mexico) Necaxa
FC Cincinnati (United States)	1–1 (6–5 p)	(Mexico) Santos Laguna
Columbus Crew (United States)	4–0	(United States) Sporting Kansas City
D.C. United (United States)	1–2	(Mexico) Mazatlán
New England Revolution (United States)	1–1 (6–7 p)	(United States) New York City FC
Orlando City SC (United States)	0–0 (4–5 p)	(Mexico) Cruz Azul
Philadelphia Union (United States)	2–0	(Canada) CF Montréal
St. Louis City SC (United States)	3–1	(United States) Portland Timbers
Toluca (Mexico)	2–2 (5–4 p)	(United States) Houston Dynamo FC
Juárez (Mexico)	2–3	(United States) Colorado Rapids
América (Mexico)	2–1	(Mexico) Atlas

=== Round of 16 ===
Team 1	Score	Team 2
Seattle Sounders FC (United States)	4–0	(Mexico) UNAM
Columbus Crew (United States)	3–2	(United States) Inter Miami CF
FC Cincinnati (United States)	2–4	(United States) Philadelphia Union
Cruz Azul (Mexico)	2–2 (1–3 p)	(Mexico) Mazatlán
UANL (Mexico)	1–2	(United States) New York City FC
Toluca (Mexico)	1–2	(United States) Colorado Rapids
América (Mexico)	4–2	(United States) St. Louis City SC
Los Angeles FC (United States)	4–1	(United States) San Jose Earthquakes

=== Quarterfinals ===
Team 1	Score	Team 2
Columbus Crew (United States)	1–1 (4–3 p)	(United States) New York City FC
Philadelphia Union (United States)	1–1 (4–3 p)	(Mexico) Mazatlán
Seattle Sounders FC (United States)	0–3	(United States) Los Angeles FC
América (Mexico)	0–0 (8–9 p)	(United States) Colorado Rapids

=== Semifinals ===
Team 1	Score	Team 2
Columbus Crew (United States)	3–1	(United States) Philadelphia Union
Los Angeles FC (United States)	4–0	(United States) Colorado Rapids

=== Third place playoff ===
Team 1	Score	Team 2
Philadelphia Union (United States)	2–2 (1–3 p)	(United States) Colorado Rapids

=== Final ===
Both finalists qualified for the 2025 CONCACAF Champions Cup, with the winners advancing directly to the round of 16.

August 25, 2024
7:15 pm EDT

Columbus Crew (United States Soccer Federation)	3–1	(United States Soccer Federation) Los Angeles FC
Hernández 45', 90+2'; Russell-Rowe 90+4'	Report	Giroud 57'

Lower.com Field, Columbus, Ohio
Attendance: 20,190
Referee: Oshane Nation (Jamaica)

== Statistics ==
=== Top goalscorers ===
Team eliminated for this round.
Player was inactive for this round.

Rank	Player	Team	MD1	MD2	MD3	R32	R16	QF	SF	3rd	F	Total
1	(Israel) Tai Baribo	(United States) Philadelphia Union	1			2	2			2		7
2	(Gabon) Denis Bouanga	(United States) Los Angeles FC	1			1	2	1	1			6
2	(Uruguay) Diego Rossi	(United States) Columbus Crew				2	2		2			6
4	(United States) Jeremy Ebobisse	(United States) San Jose Earthquakes	1	1		2						4
4	(Colombia) Cucho Hernández	(United States) Columbus Crew						1	1		2	4
4	(Uruguay) Cristian Olivera	(United States) Los Angeles FC	2			1	1					4
4	(Paraguay) Matías Rojas	(United States) Inter Miami CF	1			2	1					4
8	(Mexico) Jesús Angulo	(Mexico) Toluca		1	1	1						3
8	(Poland) Mateusz Bogusz	(United States) Los Angeles FC		1			1		1			3
8	(Sierra Leone) Kei Kamara	(United States) Los Angeles FC		1				1	1			3
8	(United States) Jordan Morris	(United States) Seattle Sounders FC	1				2					3
8	(Uruguay) Santiago Rodríguez	(United States) New York City FC			1	1	1					3

== Controversies ==
Some pointed out that the Leagues Cup interrupted the schedules of both Liga MX and MLS. French player André-Pierre Gignac stated: "I don't think that in Europe Marseille would have agreed to stop the local tournament for a month to go to another country to compete in an international one, but it is part of the growth of two leagues, of a rivalry. The United States is a spectacle and is great."

He also added: "It would be good if American clubs could come to play in Mexico because in Mexico there are different altitudes and climates, which would be beneficial."

In a similar way, Toluca's Portuguese trainer Renato Paiva declared: "For me it doesn't make sense to cut the tournament. Who am I to teach people to organize tournaments, but I think these types of strikes should be for national teams. Today you start the Leagues Cup, you finish it and start the championship later or you start the championship, you finish it and you start the Leagues Cup later."

Additionally, a reporter from the newspaper Récord reported that the Leagues Cup would impose a $25,000 fine on anyone who spoke negatively about the tournament, which was slightly more than 450,000 Mexican pesos. This decision was reportedly due to the negative feedback received by the event's organizers in 2023, when León players spent an extended period at the airport due to logistical problems.

Following Tijuana's defeat to Los Angeles FC on July 26, and regarding a controversial expulsion during the match, goalkeeper Antonio Rodríguez limited his comments to the press area, as he admitted that he could face punishment: "I don't have the slightest idea, I was far away and I only saw that they gave him the red card (...) We can't speak badly about the Leagues Cup because they'll fine us", the goalkeeper told Salvadoran journalist Rodrigo Serrano.

== See also ==
- 2024 CONCACAF Champions Cup
- 2024 CONCACAF Central American Cup
- 2024 CONCACAF Caribbean Cup
- 2024 CFU Club Shield
- 2024–25 CONCACAF W Champions Cup
