= Malte Amundsen =

Danish footballer (born 1998)

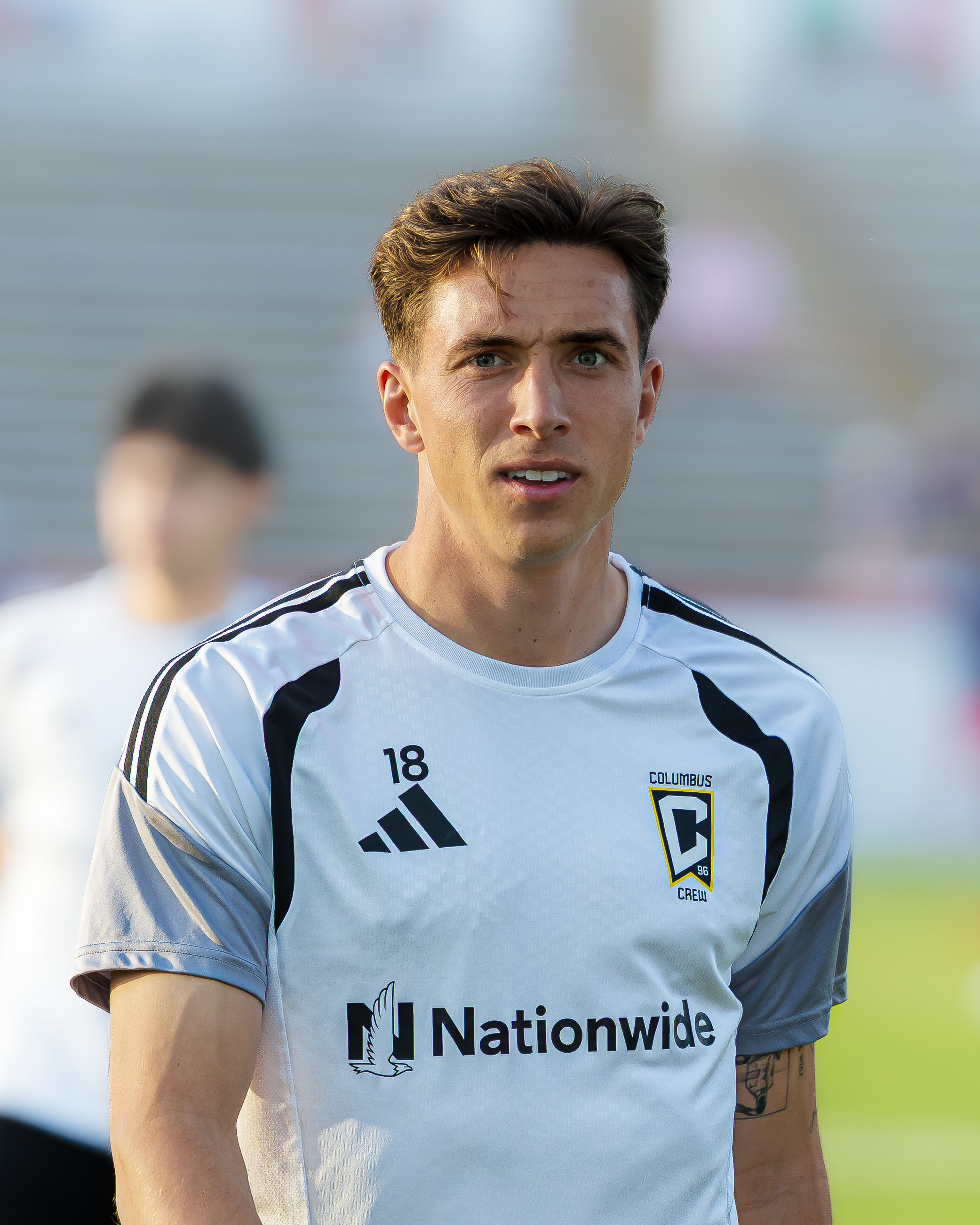
- Amundsen with the Columbus Crew in 2026

Personal information
- Full name: Malte Meineche Amundsen
- Date of birth: 11 February 1998 (age 28)
- Place of birth: Næstved, Denmark
- Height: 1.78 m (5 ft 10 in)
- Positions: Left back; centre-back

Team information
- Current team: Columbus Crew
- Number: 18

Youth career
- 200?–2013: Næstved
- 2013–2015: HB Køge

Senior career*
Years	Team	Apps	(Gls)
2015–2018	HB Køge	60	(1)
2018–2019	Rosenborg	0	(0)
2018–2019	→ Eintracht Braunschweig (loan)	12	(1)
2019–2021	Vejle	53	(2)
2021–2023	New York City FC	59	(1)
2023–	Columbus Crew	106	(7)
2023	Columbus Crew 2	1	(0)

International career
2016	Denmark U18	3	(0)
2016–2017	Denmark U19	8	(0)
2017	Denmark U20	1	(0)
- * Club domestic league appearances and goals as of 8 November 2026

Malte Meineche Amundsen (Danish: [ˈmæltə]; born 11 February 1998) is a Danish professional footballer who plays as a defender for Major League Soccer club Columbus Crew.

Born in Næstved, Denmark, Amundsen began his career with Næstved Boldklub before joining the academy of HB Køge, where he made his senior debut in 2015. He later played for Rosenborg BK and spent time on loan with Eintracht Braunschweig before returning to Denmark with Vejle Boldklub in 2019. In 2021 he moved to the United States and played for New York City FC, winning the MLS Cup that year. He was traded to the Columbus Crew in 2023 and won a second MLS Cup with the club later that season.

== Early and club career ==
=== HB Koge ===
Born in Næstved, Amundsen started his youth career with hometown club Næstved Boldklub, before moving to the HB Køge youth academy in January 2013. He made his debut in the Danish Cup on 23 September 2015 against AC Horsens. A few months later on 29 November 2015, he made his league debut coming on against FC Vestsjælland.

=== Rosenborg and loan to Germany ===
In January 2018, Amundsen agreed to a transfer and signed a four-year contract with Norwegian club Rosenborg. He made his debut on 20 April, playing the full match against Trygg/Lade in a cup game which Rosenborg won 4–2. A week later, he started against Lillestrøm in the 2018 Mesterfinalen and helped secure a 1–0 victory. Appearing in three total games in three months for his new club, Amundsen went on loan to 3. Liga club Eintracht Braunschweig in order to get some playing time, and was reunited with his former manager at HB Køge. On 11 August 2018, Amundsen scored his first goal and received his first sending off for his new club against Wehen, scoring in the 74th minute and receiving a second yellow in the 90th minute. After being at the bottom of the 3. Liga table, the manager was fired and, as a result, Amundsen played sporadically over the following three months following the regime change, appearing in 14 total matches across all competitions for the German club.

=== Vejle ===
After a "challenging" 2018, Amundsen returned to Denmark, signing a three-and-a-half-year contract with Vejle Boldklub on 15 January 2019. He scored two goals for his new club, the first goal coming in a 2–1 loss versus Skive IK, and the second coming in a 3–2 win against Lyngby, with Amundsen scoring the game winner from outside the box.

=== New York City FC ===
On 10 February 2021, it was announced that Vejle and New York City FC of Major League Soccer had successfully negotiated a transfer of Amundsen for a reported fee of around ten million Danish Krone. During his first year in the United States, Amundsen appeared in 36 games across all competitions, starting in 17 of them. On 25 July 2021, Amundsen scored his first goal and got his first assist for the club in a 5–0 drubbing of Orlando City. In October he assisted on two goals in the 6–0 thrashing of D.C. United. Amundsen was part of the squad that won the 2021 MLS Cup, the first in the club's history.

=== Columbus Crew ===
==== 2023–2024: Title winning seasons ====
On 25 April 2023, Amundsen was traded to the Columbus Crew in exchange for a potential figure of up to $500,000 In General Allocation Money. He made his first appearance for the Crew on 10 May 2023, starting in a Lamar Hunt U.S. Open Cup win against Loudoun United. He scored his first two goals with his new club in back-to-back games, the first in a 2–0 victory versus LA Galaxy on 17 May, and his second in a 3–2 loss versus FC Cincinnati on 20 May. At the conclusion of the 2023 season, Amundsen scored 5 goals across all competitions, including a long-range goal against Atlanta United in the playoffs. He provided the game-winning assist to Yaw Yeboah in the MLS Cup Final, where Columbus secured a 2–1 victory, earning Amundsen his second MLS Cup title.

On 15 August 2024, it was announced that Amundsen had signed a contract extension until 2027. Ten days later, he started in the Leagues Cup final, beating Los Angeles FC 3–1, giving Amundsen his second title with the club. On 19 October, he scored in the 7th minute of second-half stoppage time, giving Columbus the 3–2 win on the final game of the regular season. His low, driven shot came from outside the box.

==== 2025–2026 ====
On 24 May 2025, Amundsen scored his first goal of the 2025 season, converting a rebound from a free-kick in a 3–2 defeat to Charlotte FC. On 13 May, he suffered a knee injury in the fourth minute in a match versus Inter Miami, forcing him off the pitch. He missed nearly two months due to injury, making his return on 29 July in the first group stage match of the Leagues Cup, coming on as a second-half substitute against Toluca. Amundsen started the following match on 1 August, netting the first goal for the Crew in the eventual 3–1 win against Puebla.

At the beginning of the 2026 season, Amundsen started every minute for Columbus, before suffering a hamstring injury on 2 May against Minnesota United which forced him to miss four games.

== Career statistics ==
=== Club ===
As of match played 6 December 2025

Appearances and goals by club, season and competition
Club	Season	Division	League		National Cup		Continental		Other		Total	
Club	Season	Division	Apps	Goals	Apps	Goals	Apps	Goals	Apps	Goals	Apps	Goals
HB Køge	2015–16	1. Division	10	0	1	0	—		—		11	0
HB Køge	2016–17	1. Division	31	0	3	0	—		—		34	0
HB Køge	2017–18	1. Division	19	1	3	0	—		—		22	1
HB Køge	Total		60	1	7	0	0	0	0	0	67	1
Rosenborg	2018	Eliteserien	0	0	2	0	—		1 (Note: Appearance(s) in Mesterfinalen)	0	3	0
Eintracht Braunschweig (loan)	2018–19	3. Liga	12	1	1	0	—		1 (Note: Appearance(s) in Landespokal Niedersachsen)	0	14	1
Vejle	2018–19	Danish Superliga	10	0	2	0	—		—		12	0
Vejle	2019–20	1. Division	29	1	0	0	—		—		29	1
Vejle	2020–21	Danish Superliga	14	1	1	0	—		—		15	1
Vejle	Total		53	2	3	0	0	0	0	0	56	2
New York City FC	2021	Major League Soccer	32	1	0	0	0	0	4 (Note: Appearance(s) in MLS Cup Playoffs)	0	36	1
New York City FC	2022	Major League Soccer	27	0	2	0	6	0	—		27	0
New York City FC	Total		59	1	0	0	0	0	4	0	63	1
Columbus Crew	2023	Major League Soccer	22	3	2	0	—		9 (Note: Includes 3 appearances in Leagues Cup and 6 appearances in MLS Cup Playoffs)	2 (Note: Includes 1 goal in Leagues Cup and 1 goal in MLS Cup Playoffs)	33	5
Columbus Crew	2024	Major League Soccer	31	1	—		6	0	6 (Note: Includes 5 appearances in Leagues Cup and 1 appearance in the Campeones Cup)	1 (Note: Includes 1 goal in the Campeones Cup)	43	2
Columbus Crew	2025	Major League Soccer	24	1	—		2	0	6 (Note: Includes 3 appearances in Leagues Cup and 3 appearances in MLS Cup Playoffs)	1 (Note: Includes 1 goal in Leagues Cup)	32	2
Columbus Crew	Total		77	5	2	0	8	0	21	4	108	9
Career total			261	9	8	0	14	0	27	4	311	14

== Honours ==
Rosenborg

- Mesterfinalen: 2018

New York City FC

- MLS Cup: 2021

Columbus Crew

- MLS Cup: 2023
- Leagues Cup: 2024
- CONCACAF Champions Cup runner-up: 2024
