= Columbus NWSL team =

Future professional women's soccer team

- Founded: April 21, 2026; 5 months ago
- Stadium: ScottsMiracle-Gro Field; Columbus, Ohio
- Owner(s): Jimmy and Dee Haslam; JW and Whitney Johnson; Pete Edwards
- League: National Women's Soccer League
- Website: columbusnwsl2028.com columbusnwsl.com

A yet unnamed professional soccer team based in Columbus, Ohio, was announced as the National Women's Soccer League (NWSL)'s 18th franchise on April 21, 2026, and will begin play in the 2028 season.

== History ==
In February 2026, Jimmy and Dee Haslam, the owners of the Cleveland Browns of the National Football League (NFL) and Columbus Crew of Major League Soccer (MLS), confirmed their interest in bringing a National Women's Soccer League (NWSL) franchise to Columbus, Ohio. The team would play at ScottsMiracle-Gro Field, sharing it with the Crew, and have their own training facility. On April 20, 2026, the Columbus City Council narrowly approved a US$25 million deal to develop a training facility for the team at McCoy Park. The next day, the Franklin County Board of Commissioners approved the same amount for the development.

The expansion franchise was officially awarded on April 21, 2026, with plans to start play in the 2028 season (alongside Atlanta City FC) as the 18th team in the league. The expansion fee was reported to be a record US$205 million.
