= 2024 Leagues Cup final =

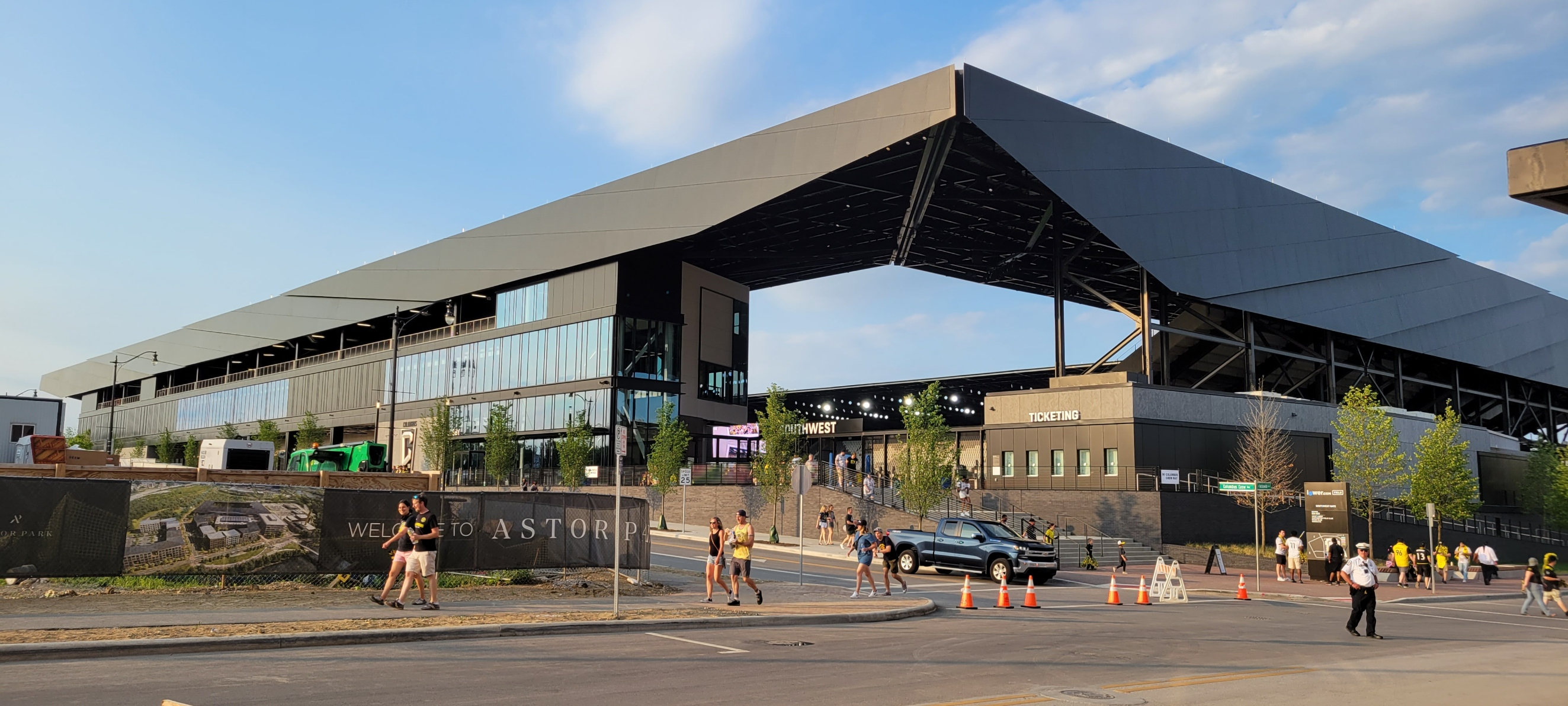
- Lower.com Field in Columbus hosted the final
- Event: 2024 Leagues Cup
Columbus Crew	Los Angeles FC
(United States Soccer Federation)	(United States Soccer Federation)
3	1
- Date: August 25, 2024
- Venue: Lower.com Field, Columbus, Ohio
- Man of the Match: Cucho Hernández (Columbus Crew)
- Referee: Oshane Nation (Jamaica)
- Attendance: 20,190
- Weather: Partly Cloudy, 91 °F (33 °C)

The 2024 Leagues Cup final was the final match of the fourth edition of the Leagues Cup, a soccer tournament played between clubs from Major League Soccer (MLS) and Liga MX. The match was played on August 25, 2024 at Lower.com Field in Columbus, Ohio, United States, by host Columbus Crew and Los Angeles FC. Columbus won 3–1 with two goals from Cucho Hernández; the match was attended by 20,190 spectators. It was a rematch of MLS Cup 2023, which was also hosted by the Columbus Crew.

The Crew won the MLS Cup and were given a bye through the Leagues Cup group stage with home-field advantage throughout the playoffs. They defeated Sporting Kansas City, defending champions Inter Miami CF, New York City FC, and the Philadelphia Union in the knockout rounds at home to reach their third tournament final in nine months. Los Angeles FC finished second in their group and outscored their knockout stage opponents by a combined scoreline of 13–1. They played all but one of their matches at home.

== Road to the final ==
=== Summary of results ===
Note: In all results below, the score of the finalist is given first (H: home; A: away). All matches were decided through a penalty shoot-out (p) if scores were tied after regulation time.

(United States Soccer Federation) Columbus Crew		Round	(United States Soccer Federation) Los Angeles FC	
Opponent	Result	Group stage	Opponent	Result
Bye		Matchday 1	(Mexican Football Federation) Tijuana	3–0 (H)
Bye		Matchday 2	(Canadian Soccer Association) Vancouver Whitecaps FC	2–2 (2–4 p) (H)
Bye		Matchday 3	Bye	
Bye		Final standings	Group West 7 runners-up: Pos / Team / Pld / Pts; 1 / (Canadian Soccer Association) Vancouver Whitecaps FC / 2 / 5; 2 / (United States Soccer Federation) Los Angeles FC / 2 / 4; 3 / (Mexican Football Federation) Tijuana / 2 / 0; Source: Leagues Cup	
Opponent	Result	Knockout stage	Opponent	Result
(United States Soccer Federation) Sporting Kansas City	4–0 (H)	Round of 32	(United States Soccer Federation) Austin FC	2–0 (H)
(United States Soccer Federation) Inter Miami CF	3–2 (H)	Round of 16	(United States Soccer Federation) San Jose Earthquakes	4–1 (H)
(United States Soccer Federation) New York City FC	1–1 (4–3 p) (H)	Quarterfinals	(United States Soccer Federation) Seattle Sounders FC	3–0 (A)
(United States Soccer Federation) Philadelphia Union	3–1 (H)	Semifinals	(United States Soccer Federation) Colorado Rapids	4–0 (H)

== Venue ==
The Leagues Cup final was played at Lower.com Field, a 20,000-seat stadium in Columbus, Ohio. The stadium is one of the largest soccer-specific venues in the United States and is home to Columbus Crew, who hosted due to being the defending MLS Cup champion.

== Broadcasting ==
The final was broadcast worldwide in English and Spanish on MLS Season Pass, a streaming service run by Apple as part of their Apple TV+ brand. The English commentary team consisted of play-by-play commentator Jake Zivin, color analyst Taylor Twellman, sideline reporter Katie Witham, and a studio team led by host Maurice Edu. The Spanish commentary team included play-by-play announcer Sammy Sadovnik, color commentator Diego Valeri, and sideline reporter Antonella González. TelevisaUnivision also produced a Spanish broadcast to be aired on television in the United States by TUDN and Univision and in Mexico on Canal 5 and TUDN. This broadcast was also streamed on Vix in Mexico, with the game commentary team included Daniel Nohra and Antonio Gómez Luna for play-by-play announcers and Hugo Salcedo as a color commentator.

== Match ==
=== Details ===
August 25, 2024
7:15 p.m. EDT

Columbus Crew (United States Soccer Federation)	3–1	(United States Soccer Federation) Los Angeles FC
Hernández 45', 90+2'; Russell-Rowe 90+4'	Report	Giroud 57'

Lower.com Field, Columbus, Ohio
Attendance: 20,190
Referee: Oshane Nation (Jamaica)

Columbus Crew	Los Angeles FC
