= Cucho Hernández =

Colombian footballer (born 1999)

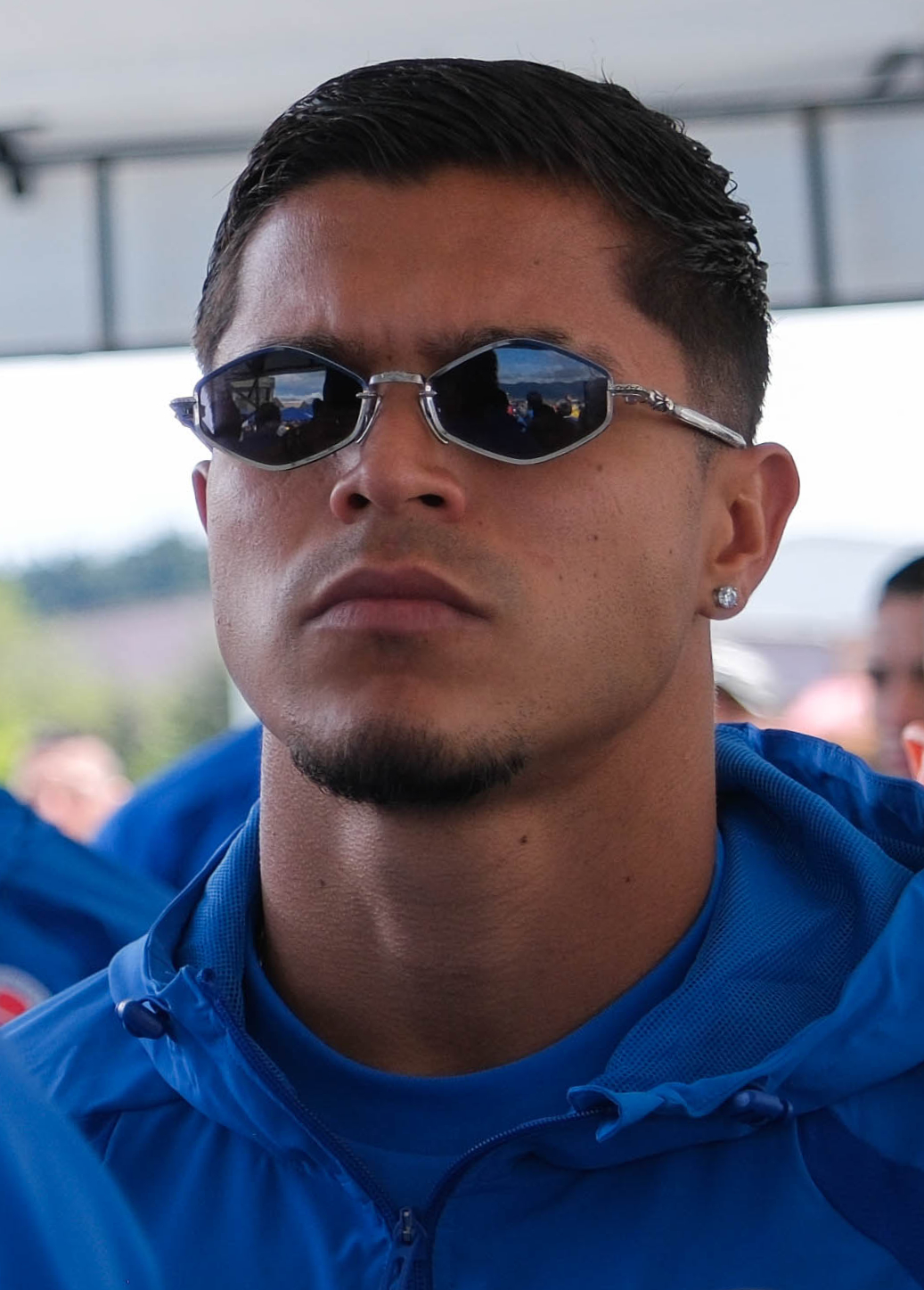
- Hernández with Colombia in 2026

Personal information
- Full name: Juan Camilo Hernández Suárez
- Date of birth: 20 April 1999 (age 27)
- Place of birth: Pereira, Colombia
- Height: 1.75 m (5 ft 9 in)
- Positions: Striker; winger

Team information
- Current team: Betis
- Number: 9

Youth career
- 2004–2015: Indubolsas
- 2015: Deportivo Pereira

Senior career*
Years	Team	Apps	(Gls)
2015–2016	Deportivo Pereira	55	(23)
2017	Granada	0	(0)
2017	→ América de Cali (loan)	17	(1)
2017–2022	Watford	25	(5)
2017–2019	→ Huesca (loan)	69	(20)
2019–2020	→ Mallorca (loan)	22	(5)
2020–2021	→ Getafe (loan)	23	(2)
2022–2025	Columbus Crew	70	(44)
2025–	Real Betis	56	(18)

International career^{‡}
2017–2019	Colombia U20	14	(5)
2018–	Colombia	11	(2)
- * Club domestic league appearances and goals as of 23:02, 17 October 2026 (UTC) ‡ National team caps and goals as of 23:00, 7 July 2026 (UTC)

Juan Camilo Hernández Suárez (born 20 April 1999), better known as Cucho Hernández or simply Cucho, is a Colombian professional footballer who plays as a striker or winger for La Liga club Real Betis and the Colombia national team.

== Club career ==
=== Early career ===
Born in Pereira, Hernández played youth football for Indubolsas and was part of the Risaralda team that won the Pereira City Cup in 2014. He joined Deportivo Pereira in 2015 at the age of 15, catching the attention of the club after delivering impressive performances at the Pereira City Cup. He made his first team debut on 6 April 2015 at 15 years old, starting in a 2–1 home win against Deportes Quindío for the Categoría Primera B championship.

Hernández scored his first senior goal on 5 September 2015, netting his team's first in a 3–2 away win against Real Santander. After finishing his first season with three goals, he was named captain of the team the following year at just 17 years old. He would end up scoring 20 times during the regular season, being the tournament's top goalscorer; despite playing more as an attacking midfielder than a centre-forward. Highlights included a hat-trick in a 3–0 home victory over Tigres F.C. on 3 July 2016.

=== Granada and loan to América de Cali ===
On 22 December 2016 Hernández joined América de Cali on loan from Granada CF, after signing for the latter side in September. for a reported £200k. He made his Categoría Primera A debut on 23 February 2017, coming on as a second-half substitute in a 2–0 home loss against Jaguares de Córdoba.

Hernández scored his first goal in the top flight of Colombian football on 3 June 2017, netting the game's only goal in an away win over Deportivo Pasto.

=== Watford ===
After Granada was sold to Jiang Lizhang, former owner Gino Pozzo assigned his federative rights to Watford ahead of the 2017–18 season.

==== Loans to Huesca, Mallorca, and Getafe ====
On 8 July 2017, Hernández moved to Segunda División side SD Huesca on loan for one year. During the 2017–18 season, he scored 16 goals and was named the league's player of the month in November, while his team achieved their first-ever promotion to La Liga. On 4 June 2018, his loan was extended for a further season, and he made his top tier debut on 19 August by starting in a 2–1 away win against SD Eibar.

Hernández scored his first goal in the main category of Spanish football on 2 September 2018, netting the opener in an 8–2 loss at FC Barcelona. He finished 2018–19 with four goals in 34 appearances, as his side was immediately relegated back.

On 26 August 2019, Hernández signed a new long-term contract with Watford and joined RCD Mallorca on a season-long loan. Having arrived at Mallorca with a hamstring injury, Hernández made his debut with the club on 7 December 2019, coming on as a substitute versus Barcelona. He scored his first goal for the club on 15 February 2020 in a 1–0 victory against Alavés. At the end of the 2019–20 season, Mallorca were relegated to the Segunda División.

On 14 August 2020, Hernández remained in Spain and its first division, after joining Getafe CF on a season-long loan. On 28 December 2020, Hernández was handed a four-match suspension for post-match statements that he made about the refereeing during the 25 October match against Granada. Hernández would also miss two months of the season due to suffering a fifth metatarsal fracture during the match against Atlético Madrid on 13 March 2021. He would return to play the final two matches of the 2020–21 La Liga season.

==== Return to Watford ====
On 14 August 2021, Hernández made his debut for Watford, scoring his first — and the game's third goal — in his side's Premier League opener with Aston Villa, which Watford won 3–2. On 9 April 2022, he suffered a hamstring injury, sidelining him for six weeks. He returned to play in the final match of the season. At the conclusion of the season, Watford would be relegated.

=== Columbus Crew ===
==== 2022 season ====
On 21 June 2022, Hernández agreed to join Major League Soccer club Columbus Crew for a club-record fee of USD $10 million, joining as a Young Designated Player when the secondary transfer window opened on 7 July 2022. Hernández made his debut on 9 July 2022, coming off the bench to score the game-winning goal against Chicago Fire. He scored a brace the following match in a 2–2 draw vs D.C. United, once again off the bench, before getting his first start in MLS versus Hell is Real rivals FC Cincinnati, scoring in the 16th minute of a 2–0 victory, the first player in MLS history to score his first four goals in under 90 minutes. On 29 September 2022, Hernández was suspended one match for offensive language in Columbus's match against the Portland Timbers on 18 September. Hernández ended his first season in Major League Soccer with nine goals in 16 appearances for his new club.

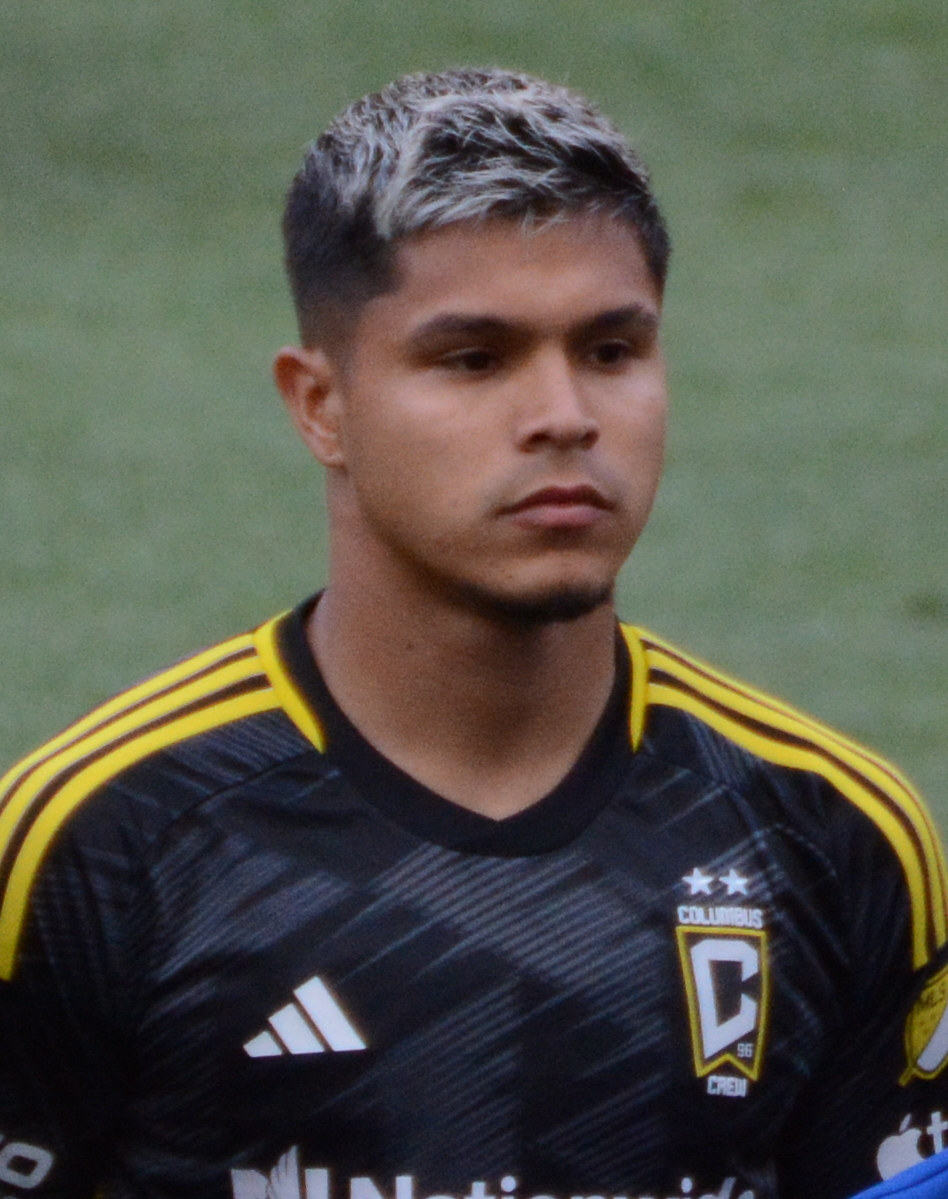
Hernández with the Columbus Crew in 2023

==== 2023 season ====
At the beginning of the 2023 season, Hernández started his side's first three games. After missing the following six games with a knee injury, Hernández made his return in a U.S. Open Cup match against Indy Eleven, playing in the first half. He scored his first goal of the 2023 season the following league match against Inter Miami. On 2 September 2023, Hernández scored a hat-trick in a 4–2 victory over CF Montréal, his first since his time at Deportivo Pereira. Hernández scored his second hat-trick for Columbus in a 3–0 victory over the Chicago Fire just two matches later. His eight goals and one assist across five matches earned him MLS Player of the Month for September. On 9 December, he scored the first goal of the match as Columbus beat LAFC 2–1 in MLS Cup, with this title being the first in his career. He was selected as MLS Cup MVP and included in the Best XI.

==== 2024 season ====
Hernández started the new season with four goals across the first six matches, including a goal in the Champions Cup. On 23 March, Hernández was substituted in the 88th minute during a 2–0 defeat to Charlotte FC, leading to a heated exchange with the assistant coaches. Following this altercation, Hernández was suspended for two games, with head coach Wilfried Nancy citing a violation of "team policy" as the reason. During his first game back from suspension, Hernández received a direct red card for violent conduct, and missed the following match against Real Salt Lake. He scored his first game back from red-card suspension against Portland on 20 April. After missing three games due to a back injury, Hernández made his return versus Pachuca in the Champions Cup final loss, and subsequently scored nine goals in nine games, including a hat-trick on 22 June versus Sporting Kansas City. The Crew won the 2024 Leagues Cup with a 3–1 victory in the final. Hernández scored two goals and assisted on the third, earning the Man of the Match title and the Best Player award for the tournament.

=== Real Betis ===
On 3 February 2025, Hernández joined La Liga club Real Betis for an undisclosed fee, with Columbus entitled to a percentage of any future transfer fee for the player.

During the 2025–26 season, Hernández scored 11 goals in La Liga and 15 goals in all competitions, finishing as Real Betis’ top scorer and helping the club secure a fifth-place finish and qualify for the UEFA Champions League for the first time in twenty years.

== International career ==
Hernández has represented Colombia at under-20 level, playing in the 2017 South American U-20 Championship, as well as the 2019 FIFA U-20 World Cup, where he scored a hat-trick against Tahiti. Hernández received his first call up to the senior side on 29 September 2018, and made his full international debut on 17 October, coming on in the 72nd minute, replacing Carlos Bacca and scoring a brace in a 3–1 friendly win over Costa Rica at Red Bull Arena in Harrison, New Jersey.

In May 2026, Hernández was named in Néstor Lorenzo's 26-man Colombia squad for the 2026 FIFA World Cup. He made his World Cup debut against Uzbekistan on 18 June, being substituted on for Luis Suárez in the 80th minute.

== Personal life ==
Hernández acquired his nickname "Cucho" at a young age, when his father shaved his head, leading him to bear a resemblance to Esteban "Cuchu" Cambiasso, a prominent Argentine footballer at the time.

He is a fan of Real Madrid.

== Career statistics ==
=== Club ===
As of match played 17 October 2026

Appearances and goals by club, season and competition
Club	Season	League			National cup (Note: Includes Copa Colombia, Copa del Rey, FA Cup, U.S. Open Cup)		League cup (Note: Includes EFL Cup)		Continental		Other		Total	
Club	Season	Division	Apps	Goals	Apps	Goals	Apps	Goals	Apps	Goals	Apps	Goals	Apps	Goals
Deportivo Pereira	2015	Categoría Primera B	22	3	1	0	—		—		—		23	3
Deportivo Pereira	2016	Categoría Primera B	33	20	1	0	—		—		—		34	20
Deportivo Pereira	Total		55	23	2	0	—		—		—		57	23
América de Cali (loan)	2017	Categoría Primera A	17	1	4	3	—		—		—		21	4
Huesca (loan)	2017–18	Segunda División	35	16	1	0	—		—		—		36	16
Huesca (loan)	2018–19	La Liga	34	4	—		—		—		—		34	4
Huesca (loan)	Total		69	20	1	0	—		—		—		70	20
Mallorca (loan)	2019–20	La Liga	22	5	2	0	—		—		—		24	5
Getafe (loan)	2020–21	La Liga	23	2	—		—		—		—		23	2
Watford	2021–22	Premier League	25	5	1	0	2	0	—		—		28	5
Columbus Crew	2022	MLS	16	9	—		—		—		—		16	9
Columbus Crew	2023	MLS	27	16	1	0	—		—		9 (Note: Three appearances and three goals in Leagues Cup, six appearances and five goals in MLS Cup playoffs)	8	37	24
Columbus Crew	2024	MLS	27	19	—		—		6 (Note: Appearances in CONCACAF Champions Cup)	2	8 (Note: Five appearances and four goals in Leagues Cup, one appearance in Campeones Cup, two appearances in MLS Cup playoffs)	4	41	25
Columbus Crew	Total		70	44	1	0	—		6	2	17	12	94	58
Betis	2024–25	La Liga	15	5	—		—		0	0	—		15	5
Betis	2025–26	La Liga	32	11	1	1	—		7 (Note: Appearances in UEFA Europa League)	3	—		40	15
Betis	2026–27	La Liga	9	2	0	0	—		1 (Note: Appearance in UEFA Champions League)	1	—		10	3
Betis	Total		56	18	1	1	—		8	4	—		65	23
Career total			335	117	12	4	2	0	14	6	17	12	380	139

=== International ===
As of match played 7 July 2026

Appearances and goals by national team and year
National team	Year	Apps	Goals
Colombia	2018	1	2
Colombia	2019	0	0
Colombia	2020	0	0
Colombia	2021	0	0
Colombia	2022	1	0
Colombia	2023	2	0
Colombia	2024	1	0
Colombia	2025	2	0
Colombia	2026	4	0
Total		11	2

Scores and results list Colombia's goal tally first, score column indicates score after each Hernández goal.

List of international goals scored by Cucho Hernández
No.	Date	Venue	Opponent	Score	Result	Competition
1	16 October 2018	Red Bull Arena, Harrison, United States	Costa Rica	2–1	3–1	Friendly
2	16 October 2018	Red Bull Arena, Harrison, United States	Costa Rica	3–1	3–1	Friendly

== Honours ==
Columbus Crew

- MLS Cup: 2023
- Leagues Cup: 2024
- CONCACAF Champions Cup runner-up: 2024

Individual

- MLS Player of the Month: September 2023, July 2024
- MLS Best XI: 2023, 2024
- MLS Cup MVP: 2023
- MLS All-Star: 2024
- Leagues Cup Best Player: 2024
