= Oshane Nation =

Jamaican football referee (born 1991)

- Born: 1991 (age 34–35); Jamaica

Domestic
Years	League	Role
??–present	Jamaica Premier League	Referee

International
Years	League	Role
2018–present	FIFA listed	Referee

Oshane Nation (born 1991) is a Jamaican football referee who has been on the FIFA International Referees List since 2018. He is also listed as a video assistant referee.

== Career ==
Since earning his FIFA badge in 2018, Nation has been active in several tournaments within CONCACAF, including the CONCACAF League, the Leagues Cup, the CONCACAF Champions Cup, and three editions of the CONCACAF Gold Cup. He has also overseen qualification matches for the FIFA World Cup. In the Gold Cup, Nation's most advanced performance was at the 2025 edition, where he oversaw a semifinal game between the United States and Guatemala. Performances at club competitions include the 2024 Leagues Cup final between Columbus Crew and Los Angeles FC.

At the international level, Nation took part in the 2023 FIFA U-20 World Cup in Argentina and has been selected by FIFA as a referee for the 2026 FIFA World Cup. His assistant referee will be Caleb Wales from Trinidad and Tobago.
