= ScottsMiracle-Gro Field =

Soccer stadium in downtown Columbus, Ohio

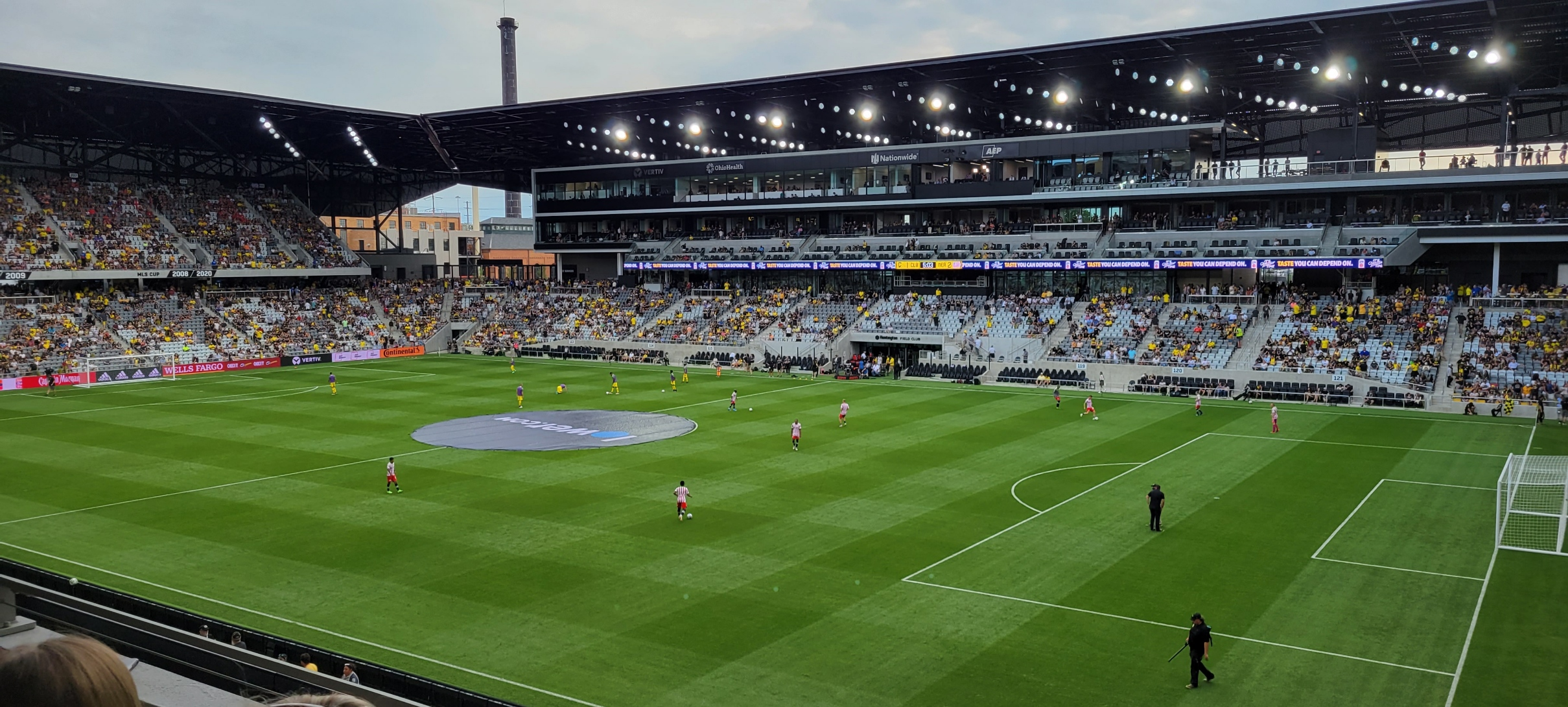
- Interior of the stadium as seen in 2021

- Location in Ohio Location in the United States
- Interactive map of ScottsMiracle-Gro Field
- Former names: New Crew Stadium (prior to opening); Lower.com Field (2021–2025)
- Address: 96 Columbus Crew Way
- Location: Columbus, Ohio, U.S.
- Coordinates: 39°58′06″N 83°01′02″W
- Owner: Confluence Community Authority (CCA)
- Operator: Columbus Crew
- Capacity: 20,371
- Type: Soccer-specific stadium
- Surface: Grass
- Field size: 115 × 75 yards

Construction
- Groundbreaking: October 10, 2019
- Opened: July 3, 2021; 5 years ago
- Cost: $314 million
- Architect: HNTB

Tenants
- Columbus Crew (MLS) 2021–present Columbus NWSL (NWSL) 2028–future

Website
- scottsmiraclegrofield.com

ScottsMiracle-Gro Field is a soccer-specific stadium in Columbus, Ohio, United States, that serves primarily as the home stadium of the Columbus Crew of Major League Soccer and an expansion team of the National Women's Soccer League. It opened in 2021 as Lower.com Field, replacing the club's previous home, Historic Crew Stadium. The new stadium cost $314 million and is located at the center of the mixed-use Astor Park development adjacent to the Arena District and downtown. It seats 20,371 spectators and includes 30 suites and 1,900 club seats.

== History ==
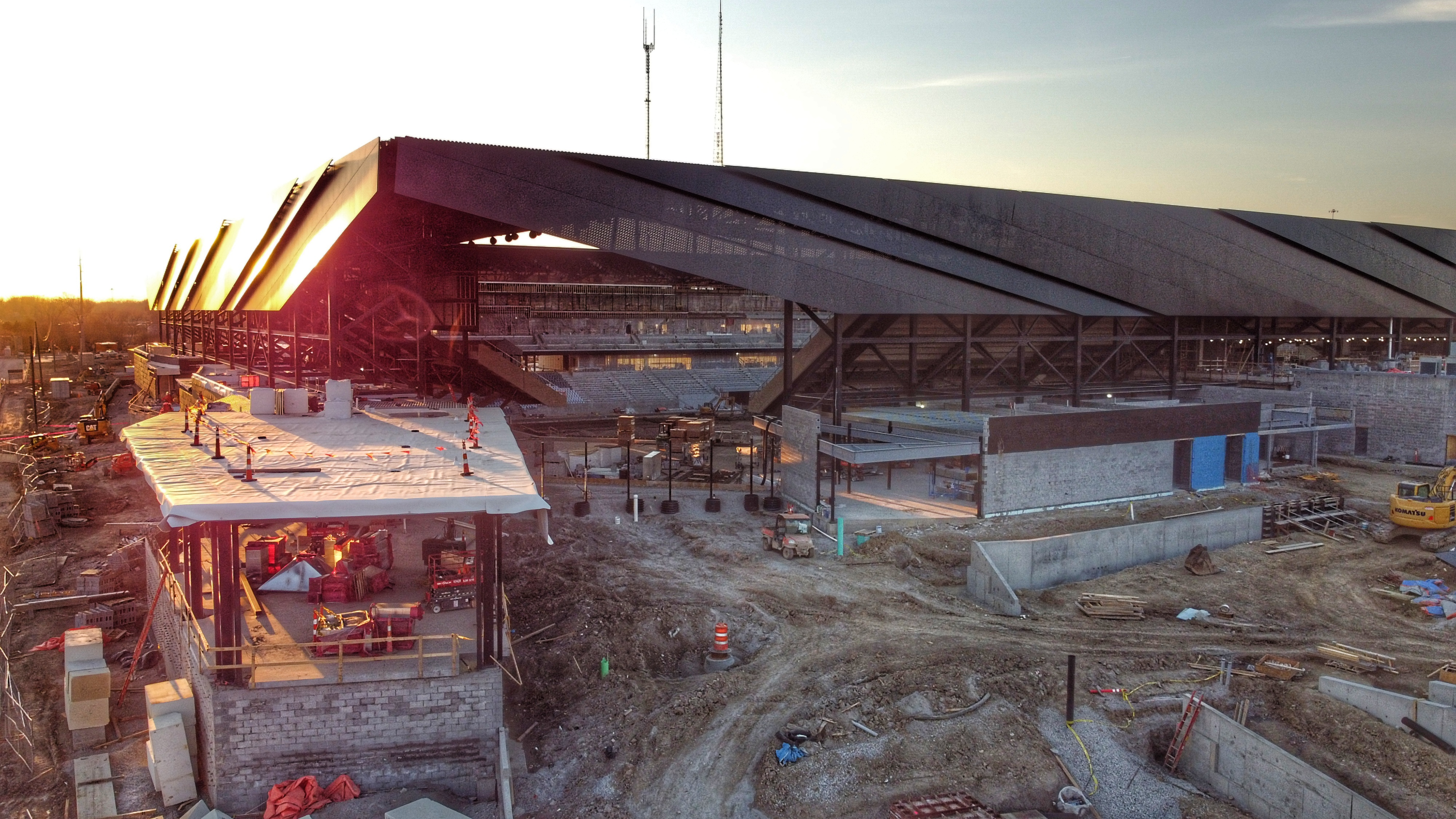
The stadium under construction, March 2021

Construction on the new stadium was originally scheduled to begin in the summer of 2019, but after delays, groundbreaking was later rescheduled to October 10, 2019. Upon completion of the stadium, Historic Crew Stadium was redeveloped into the training center of Columbus Crew.

The first game in the facility was on July 3, 2021, and resulted in a 2–2 draw between the Crew and the New England Revolution. Parts of the stadium were still under construction at the time. The first goal in stadium history was scored by Tajon Buchanan of New England; Columbus' first goal was scored by Gyasi Zardes during the same match. The Crew earned their first win at the new stadium with a 2–1 victory over New York City FC on July 17, 2021.

ScottsMiracle-Gro Field is owned by the Confluence Community Authority (CCA), a special district governed by the City of Columbus and Franklin County. The Crew have a 30-year lease with the CCA with an annual rent of $10 and an option to purchase the stadium outright in 2047 for 30 percent of its market value.

Naming rights for the facility are held by Scotts Miracle-Gro Company, based in Marysville, Ohio, through an agreement announced on November 25, 2025. The stadium was renamed to ScottsMiracle-Gro Field on the same date. For its first five seasons, the facility was known as Lower.com Field through a naming rights deal with Columbus-based online mortgage lender Lower.com. The agreement with Lower.com was announced June 15, 2021, just prior to the stadium's opening.

=== 2028 Summer Olympics ===
On February 3, 2026, the organizing committee of the 2028 Summer Olympics announced that ScottsMiracle-Gro Field was selected as one of six stadiums to host preliminary matches of the Olympic soccer tournaments; during the course of the Olympic Games, the stadium will be temporarily renamed to "Columbus Stadium" in accordance with IOC's policy on corporate-sponsored names. The stadium will host a total of nine Olympic soccer matches.

== Major events ==
=== Men's club matches ===
Date	Team #1	Result	Team #2	Tournament	Spectators
September 29, 2021	(United States) Columbus Crew	2–0	(Mexico) Cruz Azul	2021 Campeones Cup	18,026
October 8, 2022	(United States) Columbus Crew 2	4–1	(United States) St. Louis City 2	2022 MLS Next Pro Cup	7,446
October 22, 2023	(United States) Columbus Crew 2	1–3	(United States) Austin FC II	2023 MLS Next Pro Cup	7,500
December 9, 2023	(United States) Columbus Crew	2–1	(United States) Los Angeles FC	MLS Cup 2023	20,802
July 24, 2024	(United States) (Canada) MLS All-Stars	1–4	(Mexico) Liga MX All-Stars	2024 MLS All-Star Game	20,931
July 27, 2024	(United States) Columbus Crew	4–1	(England) Aston Villa	Friendly	20,218
August 25, 2024	(United States) Columbus Crew	3–1	(United States) Los Angeles FC	2024 Leagues Cup final	20,190
September 25, 2024	(United States) Columbus Crew	1–1 (4–5 p)	(Mexico) América	2024 Campeones Cup	20,198
July 12, 2026	(United States) Columbus Crew	1–1	(England) Burnley	Friendly	
October 21, 2026	(United States) Columbus Crew	0–0 (3–5 p)	(United States) St. Louis City SC	2026 U.S. Open Cup final	20,250

=== Women's club matches ===
Date	Team #1	Result	Team #2	Tournament	Spectators
June 26, 2026	(United States) Kansas City Current	2–0	(United States) Gotham FC	2026 NWSL Challenge Cup	11,369

== International matches ==
=== Men's matches ===
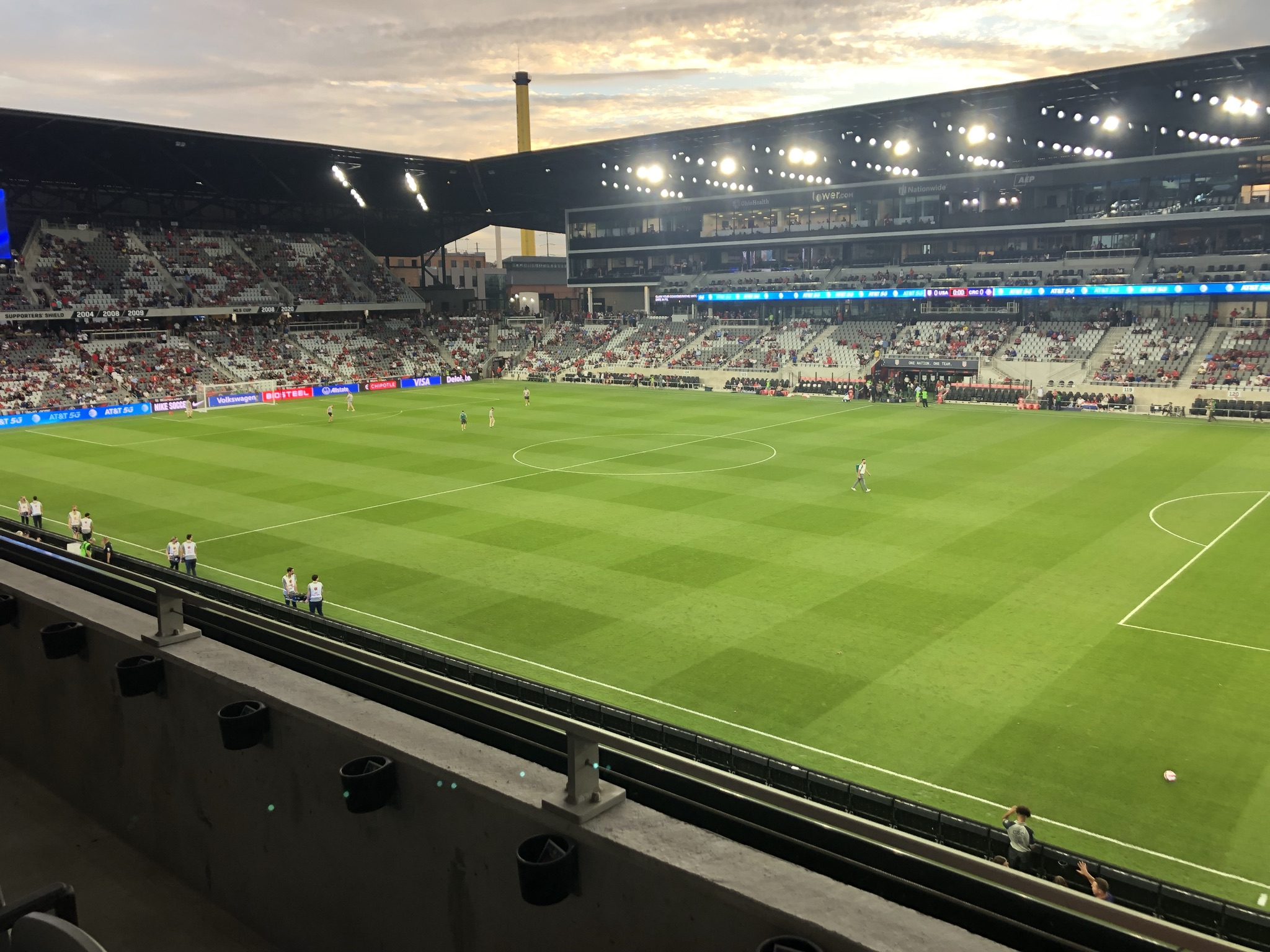
USMNT vs Costa Rica, WC qualifying, Oct 13, 2021, pre-match

Date	Team #1	Result	Team #2	Tournament	Spectators
October 13, 2021	United States	2–1	Costa Rica	2022 FIFA World Cup qualification – CONCACAF third round	20,165
January 27, 2022	United States	1–0	El Salvador	2022 FIFA World Cup qualification – CONCACAF third round	20,000
September 9, 2025	United States	2–0	Japan	Friendly	20,192
June 7, 2026	Ecuador	3–0	Guatemala	Friendly	

=== Women's matches ===
Date	Team #1	Result	Team #2	Tournament	Spectators
April 9, 2022	United States	9–1	Uzbekistan	Friendly	12,071
April 9, 2024	Japan	1–1 (0–3 p)	Brazil	2024 SheBelieves Cup	12,001
April 9, 2024	United States	2–2 (5–4 p)	Canada	2024 SheBelieves Cup	19,049
March 4, 2026	Argentina	0–1	Colombia	2026 SheBelieves Cup	18,545
March 4, 2026	United States	1–0	Canada	2026 SheBelieves Cup	18,545

== See also ==
- Lists of stadiums
- List of soccer stadiums in the United States

Events and tenants
Preceded by Historic Crew Stadium	Home of the Columbus Crew; 2021 – present	Succeeded by current
