= Jim Haslam =

American businessman and philanthropist (born 1930)

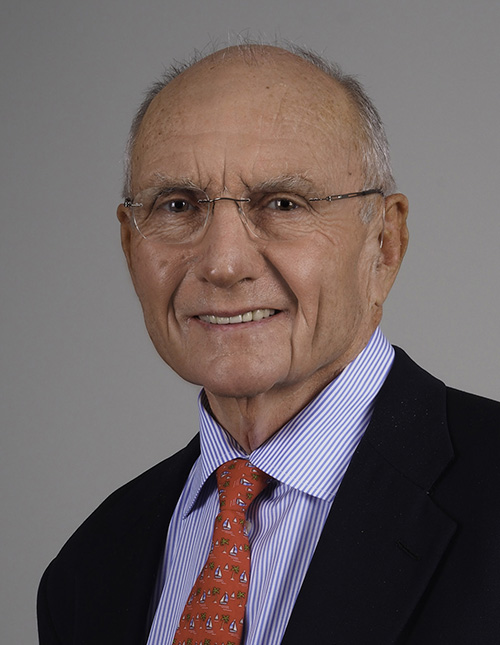
- Haslam in 2014
- Born: James Arthur Haslam II; December 13, 1930 (age 95); Detroit, Michigan, U.S.
- Education: University of Tennessee
- Years active: 1958–present
- Spouse(s): Cynthia Allen (m. 1953; died 1974) Natalie Leach (m. 1976; died 2026)
- Children: Jimmy Haslam; Bill Haslam; Ann Haslam (Bailey)

James Arthur Haslam II (born December 13, 1930) is an American businessman, best known as the founder of Pilot Company, which operates a chain of convenience stores and travel centers throughout the United States and Canada, and is one of the largest privately owned companies in the United States. Haslam is also a donor for the University of Tennessee, having provided tens of millions of dollars to the school over several decades. Haslam's son Jimmy is the current owner of the National Football League's Cleveland Browns, Major League Soccer's Columbus Crew and National Basketball Association's Milwaukee Bucks, and his other son Bill is a former Governor of Tennessee and current owner of the National Hockey League's Nashville Predators.

== Early life ==
Haslam was born in 1930 in Detroit, Michigan, the son of Melitta (Fry) and James Arthur Haslam. His father was a World War I veteran who was, at the time, working for the Studebaker Corporation. The family lived for a time in Pennsylvania before moving to St. Petersburg, Florida. Jim was a star football player at St. Petersburg High School, and had offers to play at several colleges. He eventually chose the University of Tennessee, following a recruiting visit from legendary U.T. coach Robert Neyland.

Haslam enrolled at the University of Tennessee in 1948. During the Volunteers' 1951 national championship season, he was a starter on an offensive line that helped his Sigma Chi fraternity brother, Hank Lauricella, to an All American season and a second-place finish in the voting for the Heisman Trophy. Haslam was a captain on the 1952 team, but missed the last few games of the season due to eligibility issues.

Following graduation, Haslam joined the United States Army, with the commission of Second Lieutenant. He spent several months in Korea following the 1953 armistice that ended combat operations in the Korean War. After returning to Tennessee, he turned down an offer to coach the South Pittsburg High School football team, and instead joined LaFollette, Tennessee-based Fleet Oil. After about a year, Fleet president Sam Claiborne appointed Haslam head of the company's new Sail Oil chain of stations.

== Career ==
=== Pilot Oil ===
In 1958, Haslam left Sail Oil to start his own company, having made an agreement with Claiborne that he would not compete in East Tennessee for three years. On October 9, 1958, Haslam and his first wife, Cynthia, incorporated Pilot Oil Corporation, the name of which was inspired by an insurance ad Haslam had seen while traveling in North Carolina. One month later, the company purchased its first filling station in Gate City, Virginia, for $6,000. This first station, which opened on November 20, 1958, had four fuel pumps, and sold cigarettes and soft drinks.

While waiting for his non-compete agreement with Fleet Oil to expire, Haslam focused on the Virginia and Kentucky areas. A former Pilot board member and early associate of Haslam, Jimmy Smith, later recalled that Haslam would sometimes spend days driving around a city, analyzing its traffic patterns, before deciding on a new location for a filling station. By 1965, Pilot had grown to a dozen stations, but was struggling with debt, and thus sold a 50% stake in the company to Marathon Oil. Marathon provided Pilot with a consistent supply of wholesale products and a $4 million loan, which allowed the company to further expand.

In 1974, Haslam's wife, Cynthia, died suddenly, and his eldest son, Jimmy, then a student at U.T., took her place on the company's board of directors. Shortly afterward, Pilot expanded into the convenience store market. In 1981, Pilot opened its first travel center in Corbin, Kentucky, a move inspired by a visit to fellow U.T. alum Ken Pritchard, who was operating a travel center in Slidell, Louisiana. As Marathon began to complain about Pilot's expansion efforts, Haslam bought out Marathon's share of the company in 1988.

In 1994, Pilot acquired 11 Pro Stop stations, making it the nation's second-largest truck stop chain. By 1995, Pilot was operating over 80 travel centers in 33 states and 51 convenience stores in Tennessee and Virginia, and employed over 4,000 people. That year, Haslam's son, Jimmy, moved up to CEO, while his other son, Bill, moved up to president. Haslam became the company's chairman.

In 2001, Pilot partnered with Marathon-Ashland to form Pilot Travel Centers, LLC. In 2003, Pilot bought 60 locations from Williams' Travel Centers for $189 million. By 2008, Pilot was the nation's largest operator of travel centers, with locations in 40 states and Canada, and was the nation's largest seller of over-the-road diesel fuel. That year, Pilot bought out Marathon's share of Pilot Travel Centers for $700 million, and in turn, sold a 47.5% stake to CVC Investments.

=== Pilot Flying J ===
In 2010, Pilot Travel Centers merged with the bankrupt truck stop chain Flying J to form Pilot Flying J. The new company featured over 550 locations in 23 states and Canada, and employed over 23,000 people.

== Politics ==
Haslam has been involved in politics in Knoxville, Tennessee, where Pilot is headquartered, both in an active role, and as a Republican Party fundraiser. He was a fundraiser for both Senator Howard Baker in the 1960s and President Gerald Ford in the 1970s. He was also appointed chairman of the Knox County Public Building Authority in the early 1970s. As chairman of this group, Haslam, a long-time proponent of metropolitan government, spearheaded the initiative to build the Knoxville City-County Building. In 1999, Knox County declined to reappoint Haslam to the Public Building Authority, which some interpreted as revenge for his support of a failed metropolitan government initiative the previous year.

In 2002, Haslam's son, Bill, ran for mayor of Knoxville, bringing greater public scrutiny to the Haslam family. His opponent in the race, Madeline Rogero, consistently tried to portray Bill as a puppet of his father and the region's oil interests, which Bill staunchly denied. She also blamed Jim for UT's hiring of controversial president, John Shumaker, in 2002. During Bill's 2010 gubernatorial campaign, his opponents consistently brought up price-gouging allegations levied against Pilot in the wake of Hurricane Katrina.

In 2006, Chattanooga mayor Bob Corker, a former college roommate of Jim and long-time family friend, was elected to the United States Senate. Haslam was the financial manager for his campaign. Haslam was the Tennessee state co-chairman for the 2012 presidential campaign of Republican candidate Mitt Romney. In 2021 he donated to Arizona Senator Kyrsten Sinema (Democrat) and West Virginia Senator Joe Manchin (Democrat), $2,900 to each.

== Philanthropy ==
Haslam serves on the University of Tennessee's board of trustees and has donated tens of millions of dollars to the school and its athletic programs over the years. In 2002, the football team's new practice field was named "Haslam Field" in his honor. The Haslam family's $32.5 million donation in 2006 represents the school's largest gift ever. Part of this money was used to construct the new College of Business building, the James A. Haslam II Business Building, as well as to construct a new building for the School of Music, The Natalie L. Haslam Music Center. The money also supported construction of the Baker Center and renovations to Neyland Stadium.

The Haslams are also major donors to numerous Knoxville-area institutions, including the Knoxville Museum of Art, the Knox-Area Rescue Ministries, the East Tennessee Historical Society, the Foothills Land Conservancy, the Boys and Girls Club, United Way, St. John's Episcopal Church, and the Knoxville Zoo. In 2006, three of the zoo's newborn lion cubs were named Ann, Bill, and Jimmy, in honor of Haslam's children. The Knoxville alternative newspaper, Metro Pulse, has dubbed Haslam "Knoxville's most conspicuous philanthropist." In 2014, the University of Tennessee announced that its College of Business would be renamed in honor of Haslam after the family donated $50 million to the university.

== Personal life ==
Haslam married Cynthia Allen in 1953. They have three children: James "Jimmy" Haslam III (born 1954), Ann Haslam Bailey (born 1956), and Bill Haslam (born 1958). After Cynthia's unexpected death in 1974, Haslam married his longtime friend, Natalie Leach Tucker, in 1976. Through her, he has three stepchildren, Jennie McCabe, Susan Robie, and Carol Pattison. Natalie died in 2026.

As of 2026, Bill is an owner of the Nashville Predators. He is the former governor of Tennessee, from 2011 to 2019; further, between 2003 and 2011, he was mayor of Knoxville. Haslam's eldest son, James III (Jimmy), resigned as CEO of Pilot in September 2012 but resumed his role as CEO in February 2013. He also owned a minority stake in the Pittsburgh Steelers but sold it to accommodate his purchase of the Cleveland Browns franchise in August 2012, and the co-owner of the Milwaukee Bucks.
