= Pilot Company =

American petroleum and convenience store company

Pilot Company LLC
- Type: Private
- Industry: Truck stop Convenience store Petroleum; Restaurant
- Founded: 1958; 68 years ago in Gate City, Virginia
- Founder: Jim Haslam
- Headquarters: Knoxville, Tennessee, United States
- Area served: Canada, United States
- Key people: Jimmy Haslam (Chairman and CEO)
- Revenue: US$19.6 billion(FY 2017)
- Operating income: US$475.0 million(FY 2011)
- Total assets: US$4.1 billion(FY 2011)
- Number of employees: 19,000
- Website: www.pilotcompany.com

Pilot Company (or simply Pilot) is an American petroleum corporation headquartered in Knoxville, Tennessee. Pilot operates the Pilot Food Mart convenience stores in Tennessee. Pilot was a joint-owner of truck stop chain Pilot Flying J from 2009 until 2024, when its remaining stake was sold to Berkshire Hathaway.

== History ==
Pilot Company was founded by James Haslam Jr. in Weber City, Virginia when Haslam purchased an existing gasoline station and opened it on November 20, 1958. By 1965, Pilot owned 12 stations, and was selling 5 million gallons of fuel yearly. Pilot built its first convenience store in 1976, and converted the rest of its locations into convenience stores.

In 1981, Pilot built its first travel center, and has focused on that aspect of its business ever since. 1988 saw Pilot begin its concentration on expanding its travel center network in a nationwide presence. Also in 1988, Pilot opened its first travel center with a fast food restaurant inside. On September 1, 2001, Pilot and Marathon Petroleum Company formed Pilot Travel Centers, LLC. On July 1, 2010, Pilot and Flying J's travel center chains merged to form Pilot Flying J. The two brands maintain their separate identities in the merged company.

In 2017 Berkshire Hathaway acquired a large block of shares in Pilot leading to majority control in January 2023.

=== Investigation of price gouging ===
On September 14, 2008, Florida Attorney General Bill McCollum issued subpoenas to Pilot for investigation of price gouging in the days following Hurricane Ike.

== NASCAR sponsorship ==
In 1998, Pilot sponsored Gary Bradberry and Triad Motorsports in NASCAR. This venture was short lived, however, ending in 1999.

Pilot returned to NASCAR in 2011 with the help of Scott Wombold when it became the primary sponsor of Rusty Wallace Racing driver Michael Annett in the NASCAR Nationwide Series. As the deal came after the Flying J merger, both Pilot and Flying J are primary sponsors of the car.

In 2012, when Annett moved to the Nationwide team of Richard Petty Motorsports, Pilot Flying J followed him to his new team.

In 2014, Annett moved to the Sprint Cup Series, driving the No. 7 Chevrolet for Tommy Baldwin Racing, and again Pilot Flying J followed him, re-entering the Cup Series for the first time since 1998. The sponsorship followed Annett to the No. 46 Chevrolet for HScott Motorsports on the Sprint Cup Series in 2016 and to the No. 5 Chevrolet for JR Motorsports in the Xfinity Series in 2017.
