= Town Pump =

Montanan truck stop chain

Town Pump, Inc.
- Type: Private
- Industry: Convenience store; Gas station; Casino; Hotels
- Founded: 1953; 73 years ago
- Founder: Tom Kennealy
- Headquarters: Butte, Montana, United States
- Number of locations: 200+ (2020)
- Area served: Montana
- Key people: Michael Kennealy (CEO)
- Products: Coffee; Hoagies; Prepared foods; Gasoline; Beverages; Snacks; Dairy products; Salads
- Brands: Exxon; Conoco; Pilot Travel Centers; Flying J Travel Plaza
- Revenue: US$ 662 million (2019)
- Number of employees: 3,871 (2022)
- Website: www.townpump.com

Town Pump, Inc. is a Butte, Montana-based chain of convenience stores, truck stops, casinos and roadside hotels founded in Butte in 1953. From a single full‑service gas station, the Kenneally family has expanded the company to more than 200 sites and 3,800 employees statewide.

National business media have profiled Town Pump’s strategy of pairing travel‑plaza fuel sales with franchised hotels along Interstates I‑90, I‑15 and I‑94. The firm also maintains a high public profile through its Town Pump Charitable Foundation, which has raised more than US$52 million for the state’s food banks since 2001.
