= Jimmy Haslam =

American businessman and sports team owner (born 1954)

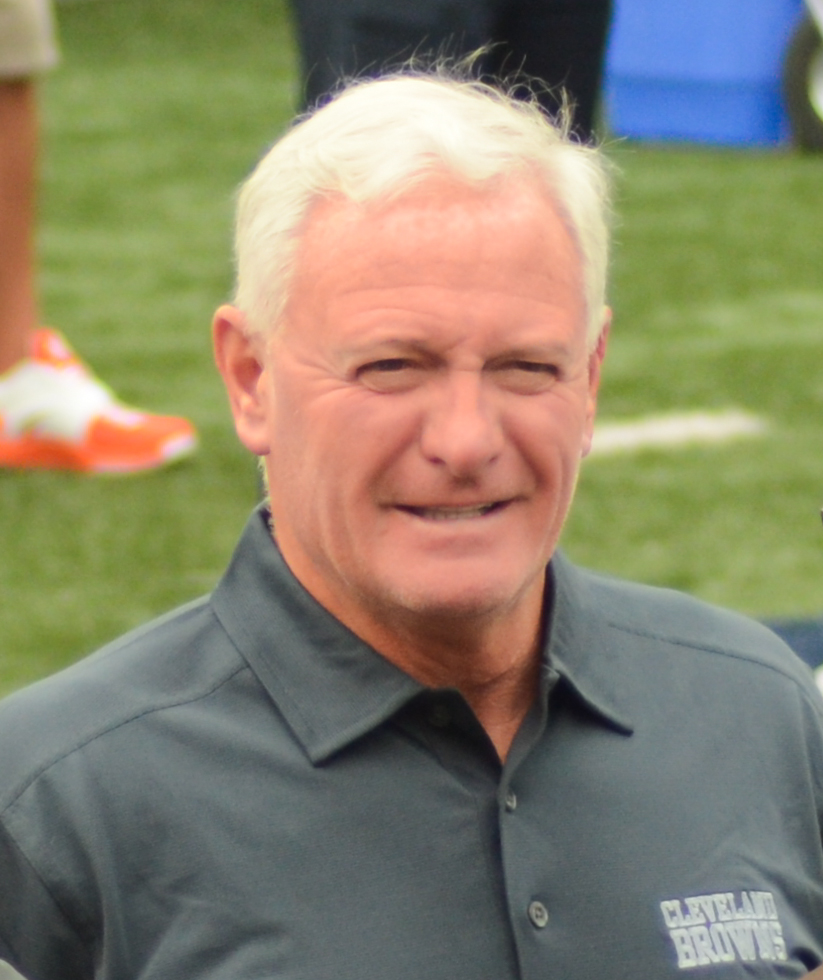
- Haslam in 2014
- Born: James Arthur Haslam III; March 9, 1954 (age 72); Knoxville, Tennessee, U.S.
- Education: University of Tennessee
- Occupations: Businessman; sports executive; investor; philanthropist
- Years active: 1974–present
- Title: See list: Former chairman of the board of the Pilot Flying J; Owner of Cleveland Browns and Columbus Crew; Co-owner of Milwaukee Bucks
- Spouse: Susan Bagwell (m. 1976)
- Children: 3
- Parents: Jim Haslam (father); Cynthia Haslam (mother)
- Relatives: Bill Haslam (brother)

James Arthur Haslam III (born March 9, 1954) is an American businessman and sports executive. He is the former chairman of the board of the Pilot Flying J truck stop chain. Haslam and his wife, Dee, own the Cleveland Browns of the National Football League (NFL), the Columbus Crew of Major League Soccer (MLS), and a stake in the Milwaukee Bucks of the National Basketball Association (NBA). Under Haslam's ownership, the Crew have won two MLS Cup Championships (2020 and 2023).

His father, Jim, founded the Pilot Corporation in 1958 as the Pilot Oil Corporation.

== Personal life ==
Haslam, who lives in his native Knoxville, Tennessee, is the elder brother of Bill Haslam, former Governor of Tennessee and owner of Nashville Predators. He is married to Susan "Dee" Bagwell Haslam, CEO of RIVR Media, part of the family ownership group of Pilot and co-owner of the Browns and Crew. They have three adult children.

While attending the University of Tennessee, Haslam was a roommate of Bob Corker, who went on to become a United States Senator from Tennessee. He is a member of the Sigma Chi fraternity.

== Pilot Flying J ==
Haslam began his career at Pilot Corporation in 1976, which his father had founded. In 1980, Haslam was named vice president of sales, development and operations. At that time, Pilot operated 100 convenience stores with annual fuel sales of about 125 million gallons. Pilot opened its first travel center in 1981, and by 1996 – the same year Haslam was named president and chief executive officer – the company operated 96 travel centers and 50 convenience stores and its total gallon sales had reached 1.2 billion. Pilot Corporation attained yet another milestone in 2001 when it joined with Marathon Ashland Petroleum LLC to form Pilot Travel Centers LLC.

In 2008, Pilot Corporation announced that CVC Capital Partners had acquired 49.8% interest in Pilot Travel Centers LLC, facilitating the sale by Marathon Petroleum Company (formerly Marathon Ashland Petroleum) of its interest in Pilot Travel Centers. Pilot Corporation retained 50% ownership of Pilot Travel Centers LLC. In 2015, the Haslam family acquired all of CVC Capital Partners' shares in the company. Pilot's convenience store operations continue to be fully owned by Pilot Corporation. In 2010, Pilot Travel Centers LLC joined with Flying J Inc. In 2012, Pilot Flying J acquired Western Petroleum and the majority ownership of Maxum Petroleum and in 2012 formed Maxum Enterprises LLC, d/b/a Pilot Logistics Services. In 2014, Pilot Logistics Services merged with Thomas Petroleum to form Pilot Thomas Logistics. Pilot Flying J subsidiary Pilot Thomas Logistics is one of the fastest growing energy logistics companies in North America.

Pilot Flying J is one of the largest top 10 privately held companies in the United States and employs more than 24,000 employees. The Pilot Flying J network provides customers with access to more than 70,000 parking spaces for trucks, 4,800 showers and 4,300 diesel lanes featuring DEF at the pump.

In April 2013, Federal Bureau of Investigation and Internal Revenue Service agents executed a search and seizure warrant and affidavit detailing a five-year fraud scheme by the Pilot Flying J chain. The company paid restitution to customers and agreed to pay a $92 million penalty pursuant to a Criminal Enforcement Agreement.

== Philanthropy ==
Haslam's civic involvement includes service on the board of directors of Anderson Media Corporation. He also has served on the boards of the United Way of Greater Knoxville, Lakeshore Park in Knoxville and the National Association of Truck Stop Operators (NATSO). In addition, Haslam served as honorary chair of the Boys & Girls Clubs of Cleveland campaign committee and as campaign chair for Knox Area Rescue Ministries and United Way of Greater Knoxville.

In 2006, he served as Tennessee statewide campaign chair for the United States Senator Bob Corker and in 2012, he served as Statewide Finance Chairman for Tennessee Governor Bill Haslam, his brother. Haslam was inducted into the Junior Achievement of East Tennessee Business Hall of Fame in 2007, and in 2010, he was named a recipient of the Ernst & Young Entrepreneur Of The Year award for the Southeast region. In 2013, the University of Tennessee recognized Haslam with the Distinguished Alumnus Award. He is the co-founder of the Haslam Scholars Program for premier honor students at the University of Tennessee.

In 2001, Jimmy and Dee Haslam founded Haslam Giving, a nonprofit organization that includes the Haslam 3 Foundation, the Columbus Crew Foundation, and the Cleveland Browns Foundation. The Haslam 3 Foundation provides funding to community organizations in Ohio and Tennessee.

Haslam has provided endowments for the creation of the Haslam Sports Innovation Center at University Hospitals, the Haslam Family Section for Cardiovascular Genetics and the Haslam Family Endowed Chair in Cardiovascular Medicine at the Cleveland Clinic, and the Haslam College of Business at University of Tennessee.

== Sports ownership ==
Haslam with Browns GM Paul DePodesta in 2017

=== National Football League ===
Haslam bought a minority interest in the Pittsburgh Steelers in 2008. In 2012, he reached an agreement with Browns owner Randy Lerner to purchase the franchise for $1 billion. The Browns were valued at $977 million in 2011 by Forbes magazine, 20th in the NFL. NFL rules prohibit ownership in multiple teams and so Haslam sold his interest in the Steelers. The Haslams' purchase of the Browns was unanimously approved by the 32 teams in the NFL on October 12; the sale itself closed thirteen days later.

Since officially taking over the Browns seven games into the 2012 season, and through week 5 of the 2024 regular season, Haslam has a 70-123-1 record as team owner, but had his first winning season in 2020 when the Browns went 11–5, and won his first postseason game as Browns owner when they defeated the Steelers 48–37 in the Wild Card round of the 2020–21 NFL playoffs.

=== Major League Soccer ===
In late 2018, reports emerged that Haslam had purchased Major League Soccer club Columbus Crew from Anthony Precourt, who wanted to move the club to Austin, Texas. Haslam, along with his wife Dee and former team physician Pete Edwards, took over as owners on January 1, 2019, as a deal to purchase the club from Precourt was finalized.

The Crew won MLS Cup 2020, giving Haslam his first major sports championship as an owner. The Crew won their second MLS Cup under Haslam's ownership in 2023.

=== National Basketball Association ===
In 2023, Haslam and his wife purchased Marc Lasry's 25% stake in the Milwaukee Bucks for $800 million, making them co-owners of the team with Wes Edens and Jamie Dinan.

=== National Women's Soccer League ===
For a reported $205 million expansion fee, the Haslam Sports Group's bid in Columbus, Ohio was named the 18th team in the National Women's Soccer League, with the team set to begin play in 2028.

== Awards and honors ==
Sports ownership

- Two-time MLS Cup champion (2020 and 2023 as co-owner of the Columbus Crew)

Business

- Junior Achievement of East Tennessee Business Hall of Fame (class of 2007)
- Significant Sig Award from the Sigma Chi Foundation
- 2010 Ernst & Young Entrepreneur of the Year Award
- 2011 University of Tennessee College of Business Administration's Distinguished Alumni Award

== Previous directorial works ==
- University of Tennessee Athletics
- Innovation Valley, Inc.
- First Horizon Corporation
- Clayton Family Foundation
- Federal Reserve Board Energy Advisory Council
- National Association of Convenience Stores Leadership Council
- Cleveland Clinic

Sporting positions
Preceded by Marc Lasry	Milwaukee Bucks principal owner 2023–present Served alongside: Wes Edens and Jamie Dinan	Incumbent
Preceded by Randy Lerner	Cleveland Browns principal owner 2012–present Served alongside: Dee Haslam	Incumbent
