= Pilot Flying J =

American truck stop company

Pilot Travel Centers LLC
- Trade name: Pilot Flying J
- Type: Private (Subsidiary)
- Industry: truck stop, convenience store, petroleum, restaurant
- Founded: 1981; 45 years ago (as Pilot Truck Stops); November 15, 1993; 33 years ago (as Pilot Travel Centers, LLC); July 1, 2010; 16 years ago (as Pilot Flying J)
- Founder: Jim Haslam
- Headquarters: Knoxville, Tennessee, U.S.
- Number of locations: 838 (2023)
- Areas served: United States and Canada
- Key people: Adam Wright, CEO
- Revenue: ▲US$45 billion (2021)
- Owners: Berkshire Hathaway
- Number of employees: 26,000+
- Divisions: Pilot Travel Centers; Flying J Travel Plaza
- Website: pilotflyingj.com

Pilot Travel Centers LLC, doing business as Pilot Flying J, is a North American chain of truck stops in the United States and Canada. The company is based in Knoxville, Tennessee. The company is owned by Berkshire Hathaway.

The company operates truck stops under the Pilot Travel Centers, Flying J Travel Plaza, ONE9 Fuel Network, and Mr. Fuel brands.

== History ==
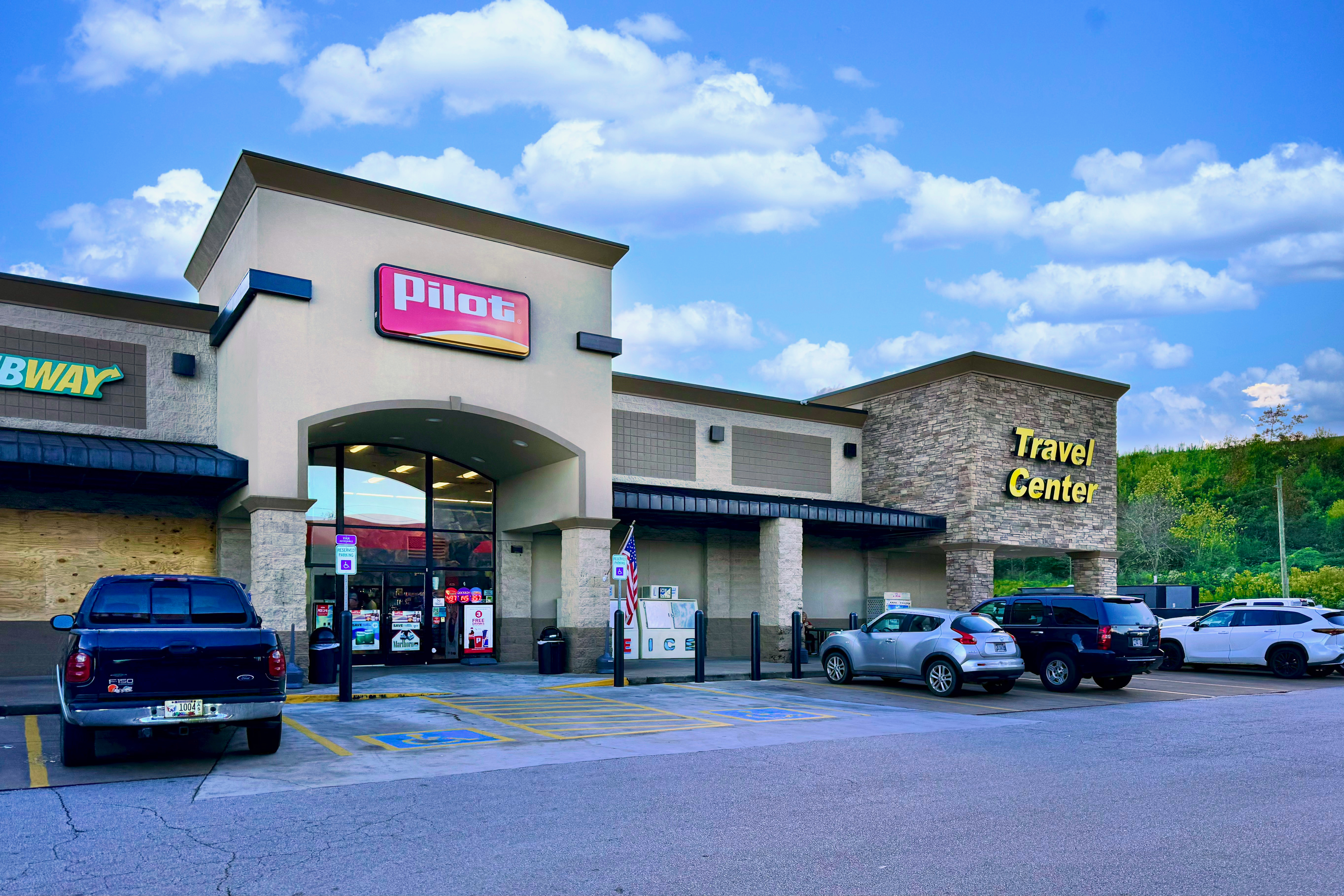
A Pilot Travel Center in Cleveland, Tennessee

Pilot Corporation opened its first truck stop in 1981.

On November 15, 1993, Pilot entered a joint venture with Marathon Petroleum Company, and all 60 or so Pilot Truck Stops were renamed Pilot Travel Centers.

Starting in mid-2002, Marathon converted many of its Speedway truck stops, to the Pilot Travel Center moniker. In 2003, Pilot Travel Centers bought the Williams Truck Stop chain. The number of stops more than quadrupled.

In 2008, Pilot bought out Marathon's interest in the business and formed a partnership with CVC Capital Partners, an international private equity firm. Pilot also has deals with Road Ranger and Town Pump, and purchased a controlling stake in Mr. Fuel in 2014. In October 2014, Pilot Flying J announced they would borrow funds to provide a $750 million dividend to shareholders and facilitate a buyout of its private-equity partner CVC Capital Partner. In 2015, the Haslam family (Pilot's Founders) completed the buyout of CVC Capital Partner's stake.

=== Flying J merger ===
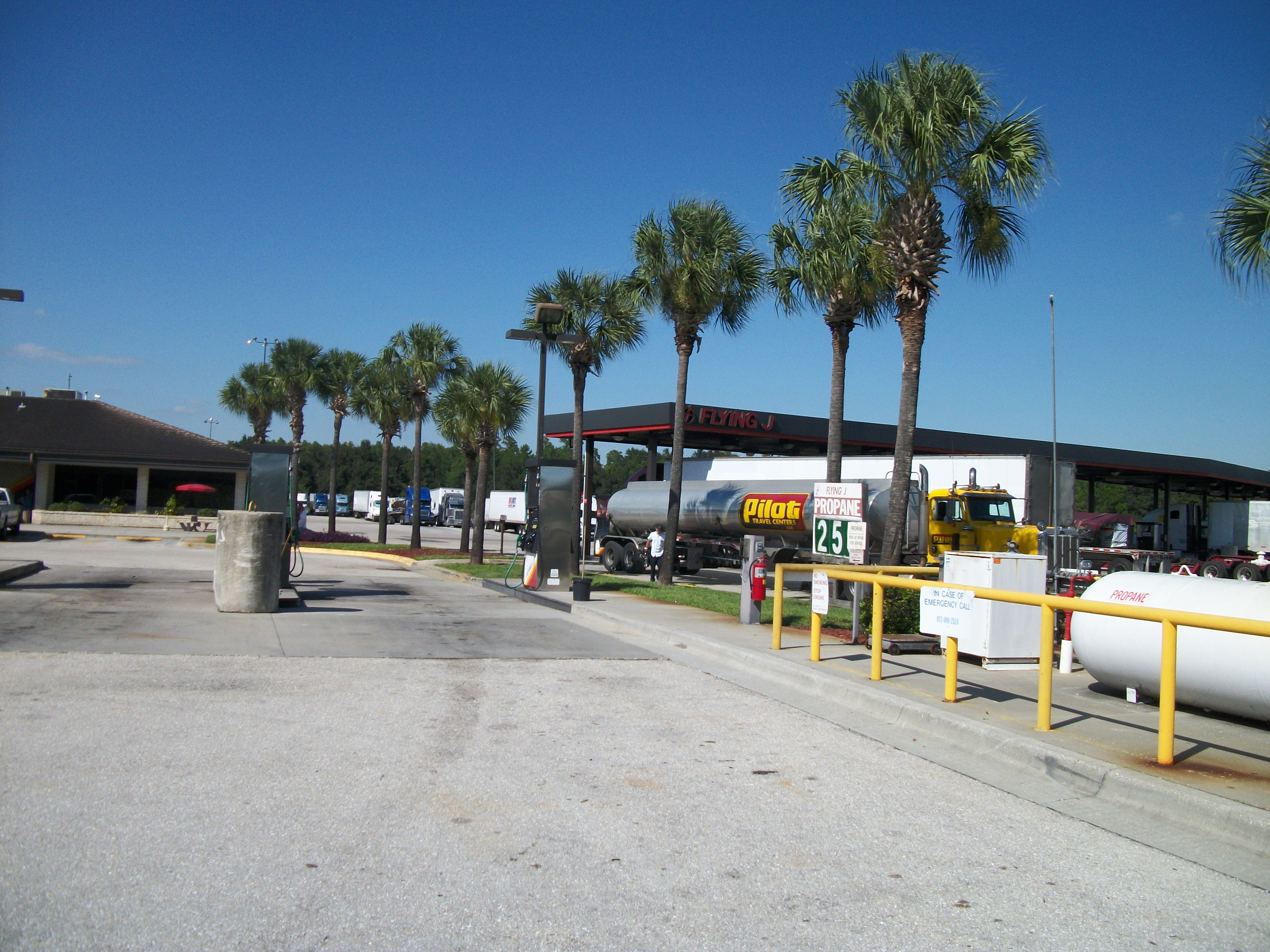
A Pilot diesel fuel truck at a Flying J in Pasco, Florida

In July 2009, Pilot agreed to purchase Flying J's travel centers, as a part of Flying J's efforts to remove itself from Chapter 11 bankruptcy. The deal was finalized for $1.8 billion on July 1, 2010, and the combined company took the d.b.a. name Pilot Flying J, while Pilot Travel Centers LLC remained the company's legal name.

As part of the deal, both the Pilot and Flying J chain kept their identities intact, while both chains started accepting the Comdata and Flying J's in-house TCH fuel cards. In addition, Flying J received cash and equity in the new combined chain. Flying J's oil and refining operations as well as its banking and insurance division remained separate from the new company, and was subsequently renamed FJ Management Inc.

To settle antitrust concerns with the Federal Trade Commission, Pilot sold 20 Pilot Travel Centers locations and six Flying J locations to Love's Travel Stops & Country Stores on June 30, 2010. The merger left the combined company with over 550 locations in 44 U.S. states and six Canadian provinces. In 2011, Pilot Flying J began a partnership with Truckers Against Trafficking.

=== PFJ Southeast ===
On June 23, 2016, Pilot Flying J and Speedway announced a new joint venture between the two companies that will see 41 Speedway locations (all former Wilco Hess locations) and 79 Pilot Flying J locations primarily in the Southeastern United States form PFJ Southeast LLC. The locations will be operated by Pilot Flying J and the Speedway locations will be rebranded as either Pilot or Flying J.

=== Berkshire Hathaway purchase ===
On October 3, 2017, it was announced that Warren Buffett-controlled Berkshire Hathaway would acquire 38.6% of Pilot Flying J, with plans to increase its stake to 80% in 2023. The Haslam family and FJ Management will retain ownership stakes until then, upon which the Haslam family will retain the remaining 20% and FJ Management will withdraw altogether. The Haslam family will retain control of day-to-day operations of the company. In January 2024, the Haslam family sold the remaining 20% to Berkshire Hathaway.

== Business profile ==
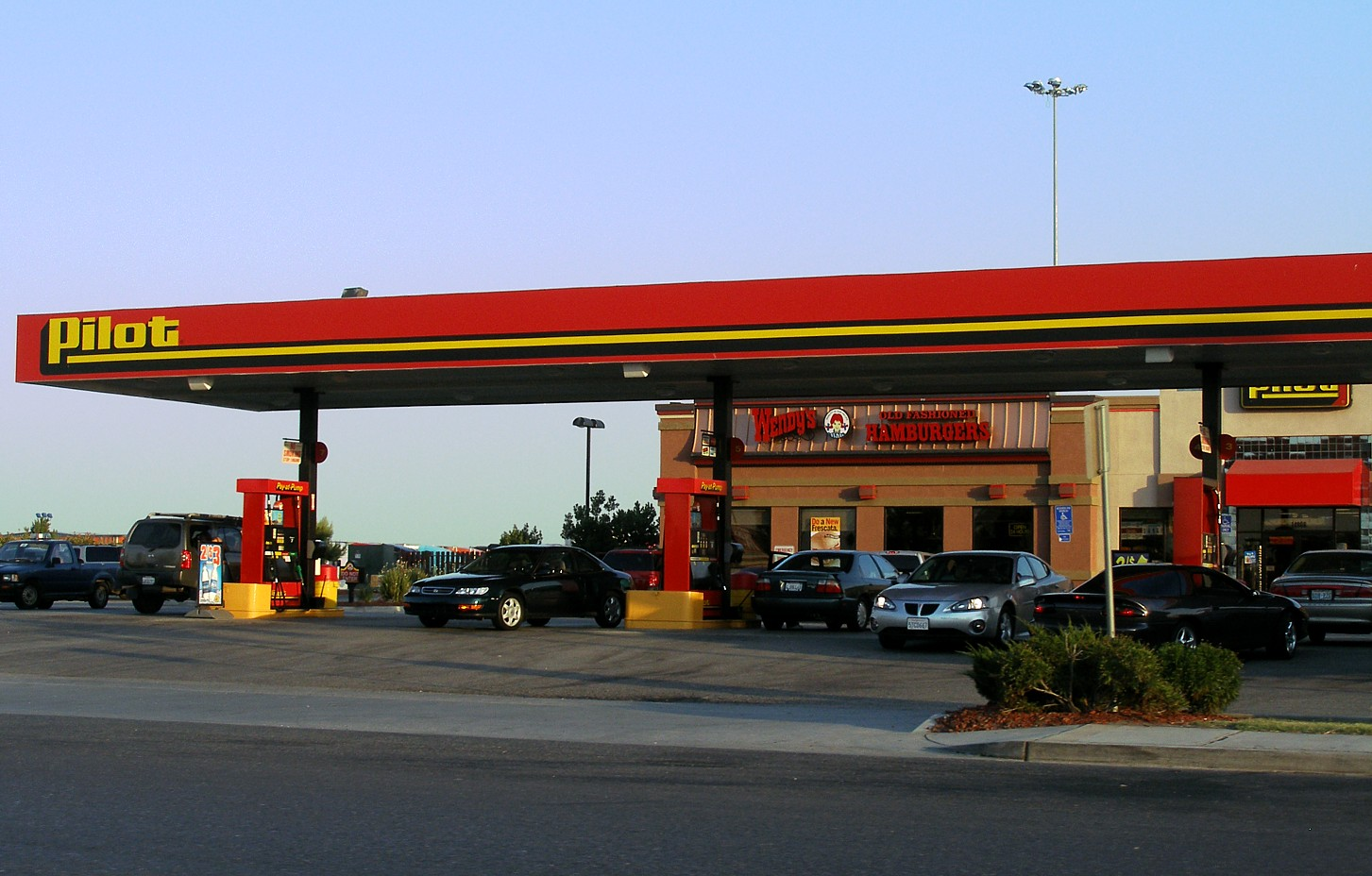
A Pilot Travel Center branded location in Lost Hills, California

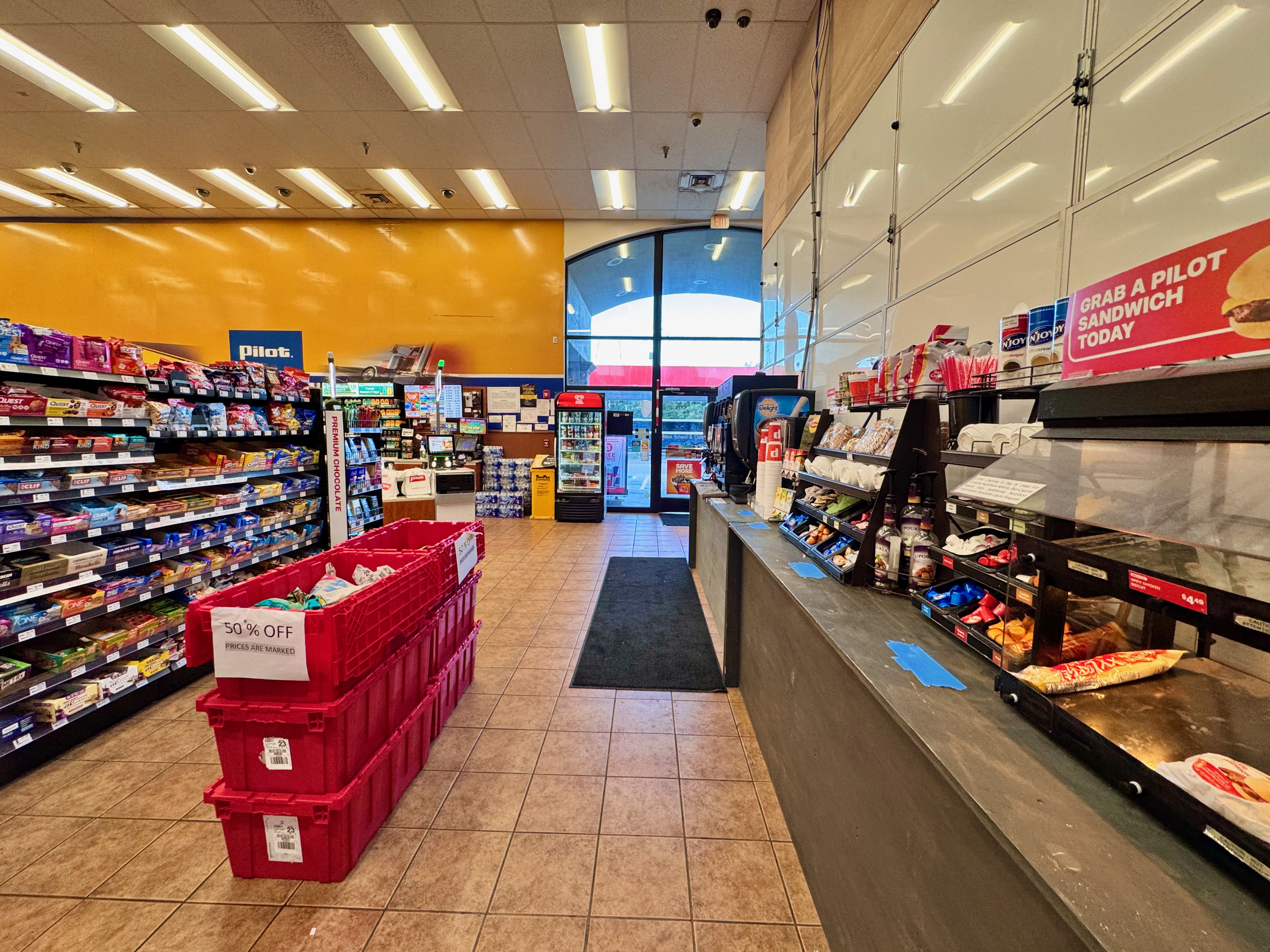
The interior of a Pilot Travel Center

Currently, Pilot Flying J is the largest purveyor of over-the-road diesel fuel in the United States. Pilot Flying J also is known as the largest Travel Center chain in the country with over 750 locations under the Pilot, Flying J, and Mr. Fuel brands. Pilot Flying J is also the third largest franchiser of quick service restaurants in the nation, offering one to three different concepts at each location, making it the largest franchisee of Subway in the world with over 200 locations. Unlike many travel centers and truck stops, the majority of locations with the Pilot Travel Centers brand do not utilize full-service dining. However, the Flying J brand does utilize full-service dining with Denny's, as do a small handful of Pilot-branded locations.

Pilot Flying J's main restaurants include Arby's, Chester's Chicken, Dairy Queen (until 2023), Denny's, Hardee's, McDonald's, Pizza Hut, Subway, Taco Bell, Wendy's, and Cinnabon. Recently they have also added Huddle House (full-service restaurants), Moe's Southwest Grill, and Dunkin' Donuts.

Pilot Flying J's main competitors include Love's Travel Stops, Travel Centers of America, Stuckey's, Roady's Truck Stops, and TA-owned Petro Stopping Centers.

In 2012, the company signed country music singer Trace Adkins to become its new spokesperson for its relaunched loyalty program. In addition to Adkins, the company has a NASCAR sponsorship with JR Motorsports driver Michael Annett as the primary sponsor for Annett's number 1 Chevrolet Camaro in NASCAR's Xfinity Series. In 2015 and 2016, the company sponsored Annett in the number 46 Chevrolet SS for HScott Motorsports in NASCAR's Sprint Cup Series and in 2014 the company sponsored Annett in the number 7 Chevrolet SS for Tommy Baldwin Racing. In 2013, the company sponsored Annett in the Richard Petty Motorsports number 43 Ford Mustang in NASCAR's Nationwide Series. In 2016, the company was the title sponsor for the "Battle at Bristol" at Bristol Motor Speedway.

== Travel center amenities ==
Pilot Travel Centers' former logo

Amenities featured at Pilot Flying J locations include:

- Parking
- Electric vehicle charging stations
- CAT Scales
- TRANSFLO Express travel documents
- Trip Paks
- Truck washes
- Audiobook rental
- Payphones
- High speed Internet kiosks
- Automated teller machines (ATMs)
- Western Union
- Check cashing
- Public laundry
- Showers
- Game rooms
- Wireless Internet access
- Lounges with big-screen televisions for professional drivers.

== Truck repairs ==
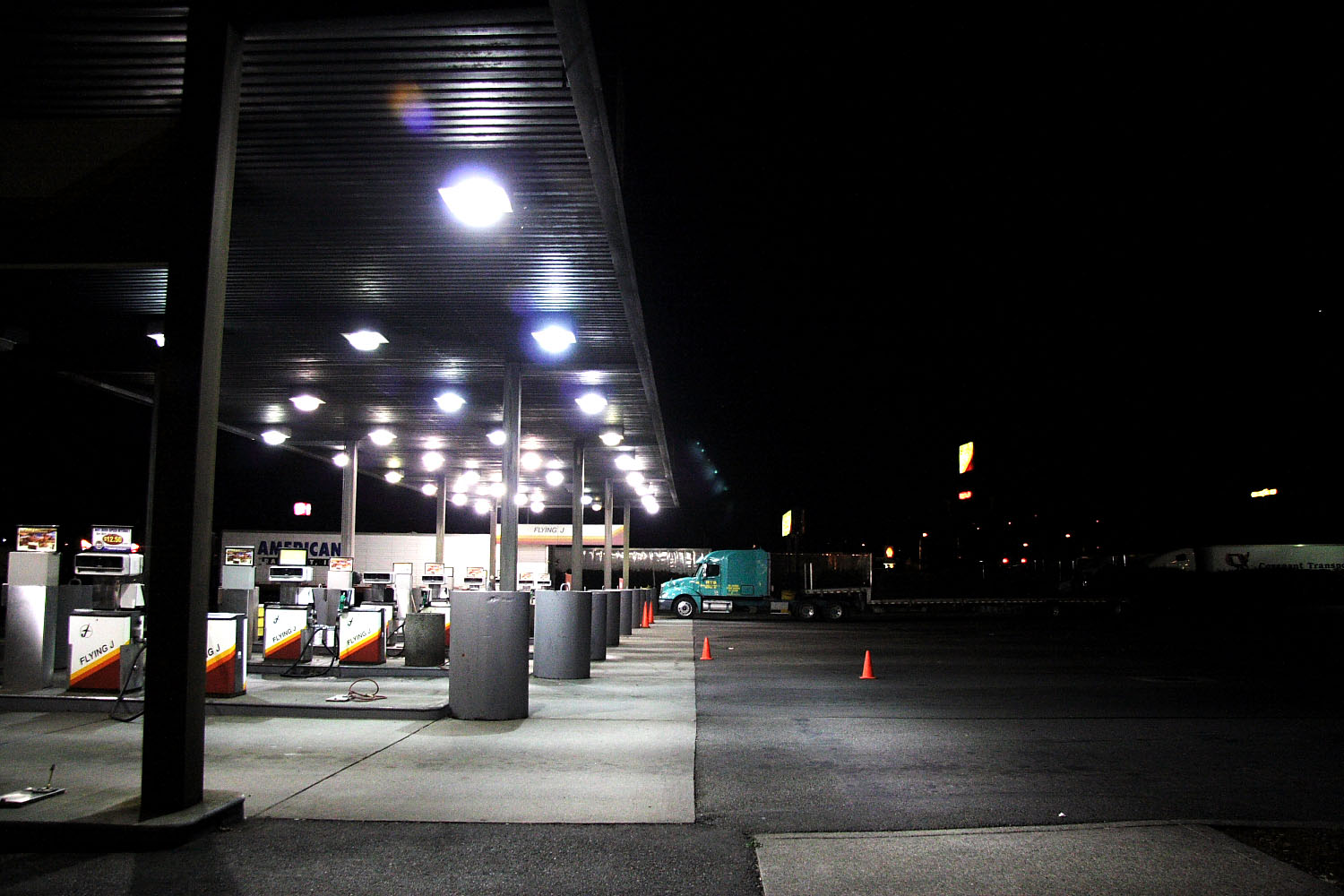
Diesel pumps at a Flying J branded location

At some locations, Pilot Flying J offers truck maintenance through garages operated by third-party companies. Wingfoot Truck Care Centers, operated by the Goodyear Tire & Rubber Company, provide 24-hour road service, preventative maintenance, tire service, part replacement, oil changes, and light mechanical work.

In addition to Wingfoot, Pilot Flying J also has Bosselman Boss Shop garages operated by Bosselman that provide similar services as Wingfoot. The Boss Shop partnership expanded as part of an agreement for Pilot Flying J to acquire most of Bosselman's truck stops in November 2011 in order to boost Pilot Flying J's presence in the Northern Great Plains region. Before the deal, Bosselman bought diesel fuel from Pilot and continues to do so for its remaining travel center location in Grand Island, Nebraska.

== Magazine ==
In 2005, Pilot Flying J joined forces with Victory 500 marketing to publish Challenge magazine, a magazine aimed at professional truckers and sold exclusively at Pilot Flying J travel centers as well as by subscription. The magazine ceased publication after 110 issues in December 2014.

== Rebate fraud ==
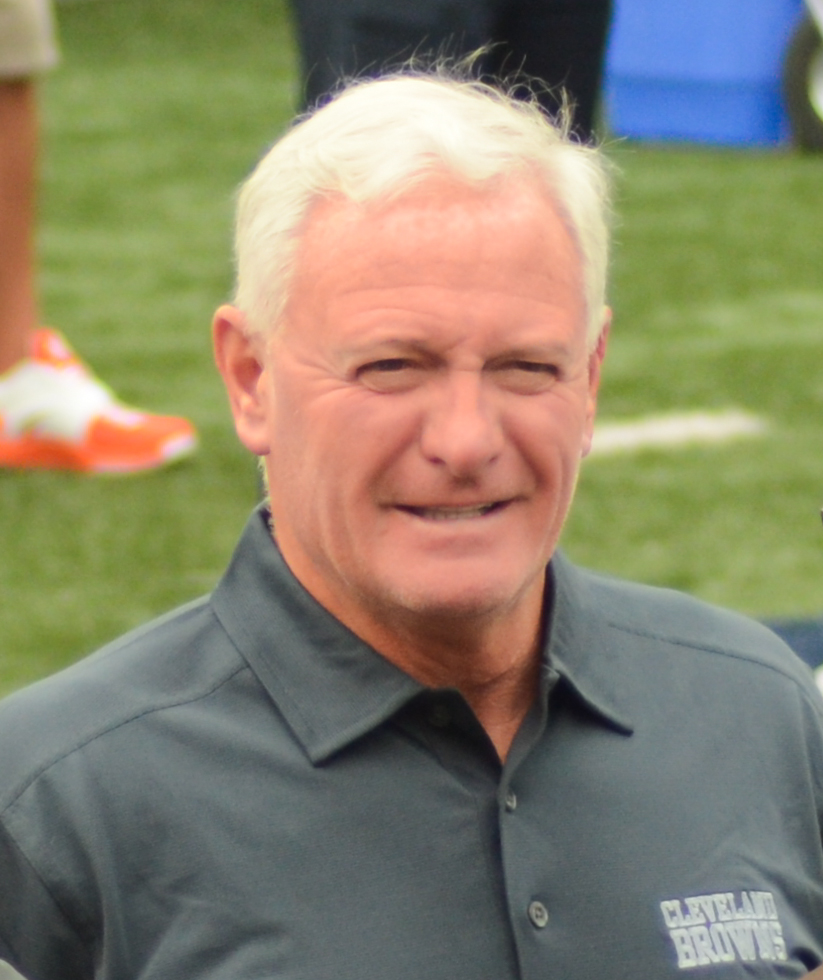
Pilot Flying J Chairman Jimmy Haslam

On April 15, 2013, the headquarters of Pilot Flying J, located in Knoxville, Tennessee, was raided by FBI and IRS agents as part of an "ongoing investigation". On April 16, CEO Jimmy Haslam reported the investigation involved claims of failure to pay rebates to trucking customers.

On April 18, 2013, an affidavit used to secure various search warrants was made public. The documents alleged that several members of the Pilot Flying J sales force, as well as company president Mark Hazelwood, were either involved or aware of the alleged scheme. Three sales employees' private homes were also raided as part of the investigation.

On Tuesday, July 16, 2013, a federal judge in Arkansas granted preliminary approval to a proposed settlement agreement between Pilot Flying J and several trucking companies that had sued over allegations of fuel rebate fraud. Pilot Flying J paid restitution to customers and agreed to pay a $92 million penalty pursuant to a Criminal Enforcement Agreement.

== See also ==
- Love's Travel Stops & Country Stores
