= Dee Haslam =

American businesswoman (born 1954)

Dee Bagwell Haslam
- Born: Susan Bagwell; July 5, 1954 (age 72); Knoxville, Tennessee, U.S
- Education: University of Tennessee
- Occupations: Businesswoman, NFL and MLS team owner, television producer
- Spouse: Jimmy Haslam (m. 1976)
- Children: 3

Susan "Dee" Haslam (née Bagwell, born July 5, 1954) is an American businesswoman. She is the founder and executive producer of RIVR Media and CEO of the Haslam Sports Group. Dee is a co-owner of the Cleveland Browns of the National Football League (NFL), along with her husband, Jimmy Haslam. The Haslams are also majority investors in the ownership group of the Columbus Crew of Major League Soccer (MLS) – with two MLS Cup champions during their tenure (MLS Cup 2020 and 2023), and have a partial ownership stake in the Milwaukee Bucks of the National Basketball Association (NBA).

== Early life and education ==
Haslam is the daughter of Ross Bagwell Sr. and Sue Burchfield Bagwell. Ross Bagwell is a pioneer in cable television, having produced thousands of hours of programming. He built one of the largest privately held production companies in the United States before selling to Scripps Howard in 1994.

Dee was raised on Long Island in her early years while her father attended NYU and worked for NBC. Upon returning to Knoxville, she completed her elementary school at Bearden Elementary and then middle school at Cedar Bluff. She attended Farragut High School for one year before transferring to Webb School of Knoxville, where she was a classmate with Jimmy Haslam.

Dee studied violin, was a girl scout, and participated in sports and clubs in high school. She and her brother, Ross, were very close growing up and later worked together in the family business. Ross Bagwell Jr. died in 2008.

After graduating from Webb, Haslam attended The University of Tennessee, graduating with a B.S. in Education. She also minored in art and still paints as a hobby.

In the spring of 1976, Dee and Jimmy began dating, and they married on December 11, 1976. They worked alongside each other in their respective family businesses throughout their careers. Partnering on finding store locations, business transactions, and major challenges. In 2012, they bought the Cleveland Browns and began their working together in earnest.

== Career ==
At the age of 17, Haslam began working for her father at Bagwell Advertising, answering the phone. As her father began to grow the production company, Cinetel Productions, she also worked on the production projects. While at Bagwell Communications, she was an account executive. In 1994, when the company was sold to Scripps Howard, Dee left along with her father and brother to form a new company: Bagwell Entertainment/Ross Television Productions. In 1998, Dee and Rob Lundgren partnered to acquire Ross Television Productions and launch RIVR Media. Lori Stryer joined Dee and Rob as a partner a few years later. Together they have produced such hits as Trading Spaces for TLC, Whale Wars for Animal Planet, and Renovation Realities for HGTV and DIY Network, and Escaping Polygamy for A&E. Haslam is also senior executive for RIVR Digital and Nest Features.

Haslam is a member of The Academy of Television Art and Sciences, the International Women's Forum, C200, and the Society of International Business Fellows, She serves on the executive board of directors of the United Way of Greater Cleveland, the Rock and Roll Hall of Fame, University Hospitals, the Greater Cleveland Partnership, the Greater Columbus Partnership, Emerald Youth Foundation, Lakeshore Park, the University of Tennessee Haslam College of Business Advisory Council and the State Collaborative on Reforming Education in Tennessee. In May 2017, she was appointed to the board of ExcelinEd., the Unify Project and the Cleveland Orchestra, and as president of the Cleveland Browns Foundation.

=== Sports ownership ===
On August 2, 2012, Dee, Jimmy and the Haslam family agreed to purchase the Cleveland Browns. The sale was unanimously approved by NFL owners on October 16, 2012, and the closing took place on October 25.

In 2014 and 2015, the Cleveland Browns, completed a $125 million renovation project of FirstEnergy Stadium (now Huntington Bank Field) in partnership with the City of Cleveland. The project included new video boards, additional lower bowl seating and new and refurbished club and premium spaces, as well as new food and beverage selections throughout the venue.

In 2016, the Haslams and the city of Berea, Ohio agreed to invest nearly $15 million in the team's training facility. The development addressed various areas throughout the building, focusing primarily on team spaces for coaches and players, as well other aspects for the business side of the organization. Through the construction, the team renovated 25,000 square feet of space, added 25,000 square feet to the facility and redesigned the locker room, player meeting rooms, player lounge, cafeteria, training room and installed a lap pool and new hot and cold tubs. The renovation also added a 4,600 square-foot wellness center for Browns employees. The Browns and the City of Berea have also agreed to a lease extension to keep the Browns' headquarters in the city through at least 2039.

In May 2019, the NFL announced that the 2021 NFL draft would be hosted in Cleveland. The Haslams and Browns partnered with the Greater Cleveland Sports Commission, City of Cleveland, and Destination Cleveland on the bid to bring the event to Northeast Ohio.

As part of the NFL, Haslam serves on the Legislative Committee, Conduct Committee, and Social Justice Committee. She and Jimmy received the Tank Younger Award from the Fritz Pollard Alliance for having built one of the most diverse front offices in all of sports. Haslam was also awarded an honorary doctorate from Baldwin Wallace University in May 2017 after giving the school's commencement speech.

Haslam Sports Group received operating rights for Major League Soccer club Columbus Crew in January 2019. The Crew won the MLS Cup 2020, giving the Haslams their first major sports championship as owners. After acquiring those rights, Crew SC and Columbus officials announced the team would build Lower.com Field in Confluence Village and the OhioHealth Performance Center, located at the current site of Historic Crew Stadium. Both venues opened in the summer of 2021.

In 2023, the Haslams purchased Marc Lasry's share of the Milwaukee Bucks. They became co-owners of the team with Wes Edens and Jamie Dinan.

== Awards and honors ==
Sports ownership

- Two-time MLS Cup champion (2020 and 2023 as co-owner of the Columbus Crew)

Television

- Parents' Choice Award for Moving Picture Books
- Genesis Award for Whale Wars

Charity work

- Delta Delta Delta Community Volunteer Award
- YWCA Tribute to Women Community Service Award

Business

- Junior Achievement Business Award
- New York Festivals World Medal
- University of Tennessee Distinguished Alumni Award
- Knoxville Chamber of Commerce Leadership Award and numerous ADDYs and Tellys.
- Cleveland Crain's 2018 Women of Note

== Personal life ==
Dee Haslam is married to Jimmy Haslam. The couple has three children.

They reside in Tennessee and Ohio.
