= Cleveland Browns =

NFL team in Cleveland, Ohio

- Current season
Logo	Wordmark
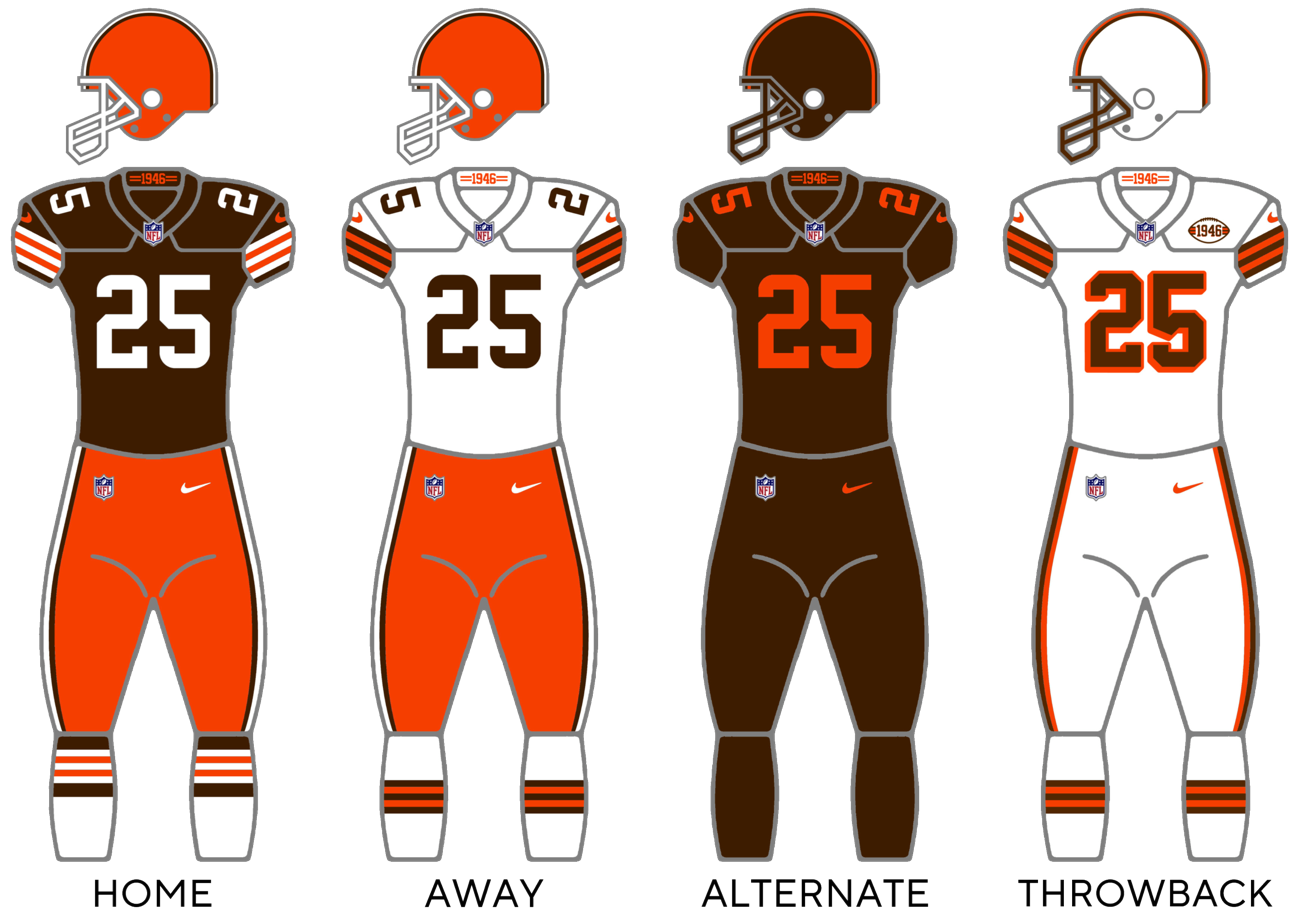
- Uniforms

General information
- Founded: June 4, 1944; 82 years ago
- Stadium: Huntington Bank Field; Cleveland, Ohio
- Headquartered: CrossCountry Mortgage Campus; Berea, Ohio
- Colors: Brown, orange, white
- Mascot: Chomps, Brownie the Elf
- Website: clevelandbrowns.com

Personnel
- Owners: Jimmy Haslam; Dee Haslam
- General manager: Andrew Berry
- Head coach: Todd Monken
- President: David Jenkins (Note: De facto)

Nickname
- The Brownies

Team history
- Cleveland Browns (1946–1995, 1999–present); Suspended operations (1996–1998)

Home fields
- Cleveland Stadium (1946–1995); Huntington Bank Field (1999–present); New Huntington Bank Field (c. 2029)

League / conference affiliations
- All-America Football Conference (1946–1949): Western Division (1946–1948); National Football League (1950–present): American Conference (1950–1952); Eastern Conference (1953–1969); Century Division (1967–1969); American Football Conference (1970–1995; 1999–present); AFC Central (1970–1995; 1999–2001); AFC North (2002–present)

Championships
- League championships: 8: AAFC championships (4) 1946, 1947, 1948, 1949; NFL championships (pre-1970 AFL–NFL merger) (4) 1950, 1954, 1955, 1964
- Conference championships: 11: NFL American: 1950, 1951, 1952; NFL Eastern: 1953, 1954, 1955, 1957, 1964, 1965, 1968, 1969
- Division championships: 12: AAFC Western: 1946, 1947, 1948; NFL Century: 1967, 1968, 1969; AFC Central: 1971, 1980, 1985, 1986, 1987, 1989

Playoff appearances (30)
- AAFC: 1946, 1947, 1948, 1949; NFL: 1950, 1951, 1952, 1953, 1954, 1955, 1957, 1958, 1964, 1965, 1967, 1968, 1969, 1971, 1972, 1980, 1982, 1985, 1986, 1987, 1988, 1989, 1994, 2002, 2020, 2023

Owners
- Arthur B. McBride (1944–1953); Dave Jones (1953–1961); Art Modell (1961–1996); Al Lerner (1998–2002); Randy Lerner (2002–2012); Jimmy & Dee Haslam (2012–present)

The Cleveland Browns are a professional American football team based in Cleveland. The Browns compete in the National Football League (NFL) as a member of the American Football Conference (AFC) North division. The team is named after original coach and co-founder Paul Brown. They play their home games at Huntington Bank Field, which opened in 1999, with administrative offices and training facilities in Berea, Ohio at the CrossCountry Mortgage campus. The franchise's official club colors are brown, orange, and white. They are unique among the 32 member clubs of the NFL in that they do not have a logo on their helmets.

The franchise was founded in 1944 by Brown and businessman Arthur B. McBride as a charter member of the All-America Football Conference (AAFC), and began play in 1946. The Browns dominated the AAFC, compiling a 47–4–3 record in the league's four seasons and winning its championship in each. When the AAFC folded after the 1949 season, the Browns joined the NFL along with the San Francisco 49ers and the original Baltimore Colts. The Browns won a championship in their inaugural NFL season, as well as in the 1954, 1955, and 1964 seasons, and in a feat unequaled in any of the North American major professional sports, played in their league championship game in each of their first 10 years of existence, winning seven of those games. From 1965 to 1995, they qualified to play in the NFL playoffs 14 times, but did not win another championship or play in the Super Bowl during that period.

In 1995, owner Art Modell, who had purchased the Browns in 1961, announced plans to move the team to Baltimore. After threats of legal action from the city of Cleveland and fans, a compromise was reached in early 1996 that allowed Modell to establish the Baltimore Ravens as a new franchise while retaining the contracts of all Browns personnel. The Browns' intellectual property, including team name, logos, training facility, and history, were kept in trust and the franchise was regarded by the NFL as suspended, guaranteed to return no later than the 1999 season, either by moving an existing franchise or an expansion draft. While several franchises considered moving to Cleveland, in 1998 it was confirmed that the NFL would hold an expansion draft and field 31 teams when the Browns resumed play in 1999. Although the 1999 Browns were restocked via an expansion draft, the Browns are not considered to be an expansion franchise.

Since resuming operations in 1999, the Browns have struggled to find success, especially during the 2010s when they failed to post a winning season throughout the decade. They have had only four winning seasons (2002, 2007, 2020, and 2023), three playoff appearances (2002, 2020, and 2023), and one playoff win (2020), winning less than one third of their games in total, and in 2017 were only the second team in NFL history to have a 0–16 season after the 2008 Detroit Lions. The franchise has also been noted for a lack of stability with head coaches (10 full time—including two who were fired after only one season—and two interim since 1999) and quarterbacks (42 different starters since 1999). From 2003 to 2019, the Browns had a 17-season playoff drought, which ended during the 2020 season. They are one of four teams to have never appeared in a Super Bowl. Their lack of recent success has been such that their decades-long rivalry with the Pittsburgh Steelers—a rivalry in which at one point the Browns had a 22-game lead in the all-time series—saw the Steelers overtake the Browns in the rivalry in 2007 to hold a current 17-game edge over the Browns.

== History ==
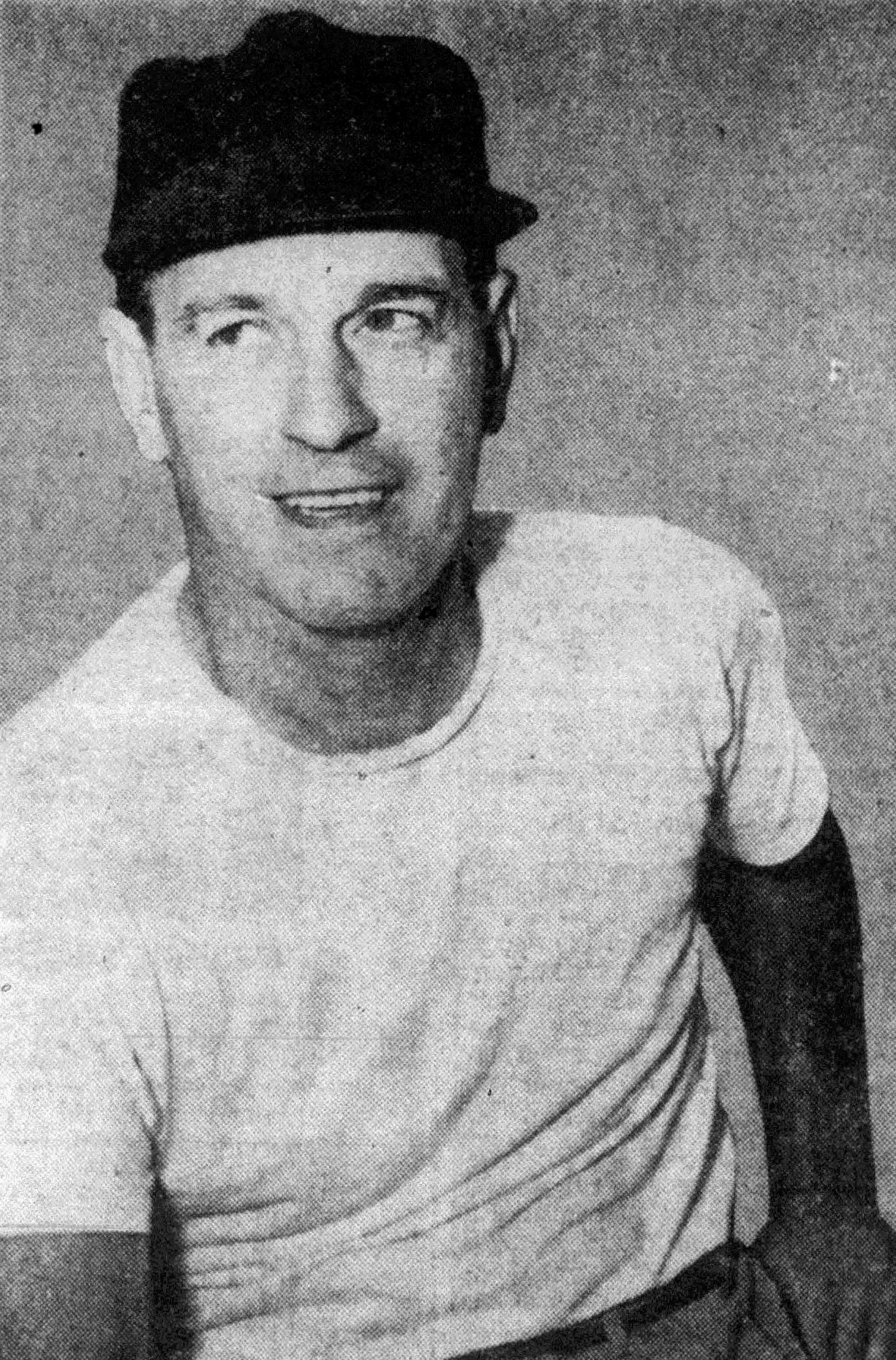
The Browns were named after original head coach Paul Brown.

The Cleveland Browns were founded in 1944 when taxicab magnate Arthur B. "Mickey" McBride secured a Cleveland franchise in the newly formed All-America Football Conference (AAFC). Paul Brown was the team's namesake and first coach. The Browns began play in 1946 in the AAFC. The Browns won each of the league's four championship games before the league dissolved in 1949. The team then moved to the more established National Football League (NFL), where it continued to dominate. Between 1950 and 1955, Cleveland reached the NFL championship game every year, winning three times.

McBride and his partners sold the team to a group of Cleveland businessmen in 1953 for a then-unheard-of $600,000. Eight years later, the team was sold again, this time to a group led by New York advertising executive Art Modell. Modell fired Brown before the 1963 season, but the team continued to win behind fullback Jim Brown. The Browns won the championship in 1964 and reached the title game the following season, losing to the Green Bay Packers.

When the AFL and NFL merged before the 1970 season, Cleveland became part of the new American Football Conference (AFC). While the Browns made it back to the playoffs in 1971 and 1972, they fell into mediocrity through the mid-1970s. A revival of sorts took place in 1979 and 1980, when quarterback Brian Sipe engineered a series of last-minute wins and the Browns came to be called the "Kardiac Kids". Under Sipe, however, the Browns did not make it past the first round of the playoffs. Quarterback Bernie Kosar, whom the Browns drafted in 1985, led the team to three AFC Championship games in the late 1980s, but lost each time to the Denver Broncos.

In 1995, Modell announced he was moving the Browns to Baltimore, drawing a mix of outrage and bitterness from Cleveland's dedicated fan base. Negotiations and legal battles led to an agreement where Modell would be allowed to take his personnel to Baltimore as an expansion franchise, called the Baltimore Ravens, but would leave Cleveland the Browns' colors, logos and heritage for a reactivated Browns franchise that would take the field no later than 1999. Before the 1991 season, the Browns hired Bill Belichick to be the head coach. He led the team one winning season in his five years with the team, which occurred in 1994. The 1994 team defeated the New England Patriots 20–13 in the Wild Card Round before falling to the Pittsburgh Steelers 29–9 in the Divisional Round. After a 5–11 season in 1995, the Browns fired Belichick.

After three years of inactivity while Cleveland Stadium was demolished and Huntington Bank Field, then known as Cleveland Browns Stadium was built on its site, the Browns were reactivated and started play again in 1999 under new owner Al Lerner. Under head coach Chris Palmer, the Browns went 2–14 in 1999 and 3–13 in 2000. The Browns struggled throughout the 2000s and 2010s, posting a record of 101–234–1 (.302) since their 1999 return. The Browns have only posted four winning seasons and three playoff appearances (2002, 2020, 2023) since returning to the NFL. The team's struggles have been magnified since 2012, when the Lerner family sold the team to businessman Jimmy Haslam. In six seasons under Haslam's ownership, the Browns went through four head coaches and four general managers, none of whom had found success.

Butch Davis was named head coach before the 2001 season. In his first season, he led the team to a 7–9 record in 2001. He led the team to a playoff berth with a 9–7 record in 2002. The Browns lost 36–33 to the Steelers in the Wild Card Round. The team regressed to a 5–11 record in the 2003 season. After a 3–8 start to the 2004 season, Davis resigned. Terry Robiskie finished out the season with a 1–4 mark. Before the 2005 season, the team hired Romeo Crennel to be their next head coach. He went 6–10 in 2005 and 4–12 in 2006. He posted a winning 10–6 record that did not qualify for the playoffs in the 2007 season. He went 4–12 in the 2008 season and was fired after the season. Eric Mangini posted consecutive 5–11 seasons as head coach in 2009 and 2010 before getting fired. Pat Shurmur coached the team to a 4–12 record in 2011 and a 5–11 record in 2012 before getting fired. Rob Chudzinski coached the Browns in the 2013 season. He was fired after a 4–12 campaign. Mike Pettine coached the team in 2014 and 2015, going 7–9 and 3–13 before getting fired. In 2016 and 2017 under head coach Hue Jackson, the Browns went 1–31 (.031, including a winless 0–16 season in 2017), the worst two-year stretch in NFL history, and received the number one overall draft pick in both of those years. Those top overall draft picks were used on Myles Garrett and Baker Mayfield.

Before the 2019 season, Freddie Kitchens was hired as head coach. Kitchens led the team to a 6–10 record and was fired after the season. Before the 2020 season, the Browns hired Kevin Stefanski as their head coach. In 2020, the Browns secured their first playoff berth since 2002 by defeating the Pittsburgh Steelers in week 17 and finishing the season 11–5. In the Wild Card Round, they defeated the Pittsburgh Steelers 48–37 for their first playoff win since 1994. The Browns saw their season end in a 22–17 loss to the Kansas City Chiefs in the Divisional Round. The 2021 season saw the Browns go 8–9 and miss the postseason. In the following season, the Browns went 7–10 and missed the postseason for the 2022 season. In the 2023 season, the Browns returned to the postseason with an 11–6 mark. The Browns ended their season with a 45–14 loss to the Texans in the Wild Card Round.

== Logos and uniforms ==
=== Logos ===
The Brownie elf was a logo used prominently in the 1950s and early '60s, and made a bit of a comeback in the 2010s and '20s.

The Browns are the only National Football League team without a helmet logo. As such, the logoless helmet serves as the Browns' official logo. The organization has used several promotional logos throughout the years; players' numbers were painted on the helmets from 1957 to 1960; and an unused "CB" logo was created in 1965. But for much of their history, the Browns' helmets have been an unadorned burnt orange color with a top stripe of dark brown (officially called "seal brown") divided by a white stripe.

The team has had various promotional logos throughout the years, such as the "Brownie Elf" mascot or a Brown "B" in a white football. While Art Modell did away with the elf in the mid-1960s (believing it to be too childish), its use has been revived since the team's return in 1999. The popularity of the Dawg Pound section at Huntington Bank Field has led to a brown and orange dog being used for various Browns functions. But overall, the orange, logo-less helmet continues as the primary trademark of the Cleveland Browns. The Browns have used special commemorative logos during individual seasons, such as the 1999 logo to celebrate the team's return to the NFL, a 60th-anniversary logo for the 2006 season, and a 75th-anniversary logo in 2021.

Browns "dawg logo", a secondary logo introduced in 2023

The current logos and wordmarks were introduced on February 24, 2015, with the helmet design remaining largely as is, the only differences being minor color changes to the shade of orange used on the helmet and the facemask being changed from gray to brown. A new secondary "dawg" logo was introduced in 2023. The logo, featuring a bull mastiff dog, was created by graphic designer Houston Mark and was the winning entry of a fan vote. It features numerous small homages to the city of Cleveland, state of Ohio, and the team's history.

By virtue of a fan poll, a version of the Brownie elf logo was featured at midfield at Huntington Bank Field from 2022 to 2024. The team reverted to the helmet logo for 2025, though the Brownie elf is still featured on banners around the perimeter of the field.

=== Uniforms ===
The designs of the jerseys, pants, and socks remained mostly the same, but the helmets have seen revisions over the years. The Browns uniforms saw their first big change before the 2015 season.

Jerseys:

1. Brown – brown (officially "seal brown") with orange-colored numbers and writing, and an orange-white-orange stripe sequence on the sleeves.
2. White (away) – white with orange numbers and writing, with a brown-orange-brown stripe sequence.
3. Orange – orange with white numerals and writing, and a brown-white-brown stripe sequence.

Pants:

1. Brown – brown pants with an orange-white-orange stripe sequence down two-thirds the length of the pants. The other third is the word "BROWNS," written in orange.
2. White – white pants with a brown-orange-brown stripes. "BROWNS" is written in brown.
3. Orange – orange pants with a brown-white-brown stripe sequence. "BROWNS" is written in brown.

Socks:

1. Solid brown.
2. Solid white.
3. Solid orange.

Helmet: Solid white (1946–1949); solid white for day games and solid orange for night games (1950–1951); orange with a single white stripe (1952–1956); orange with a single white stripe and brown numerals on the sides (1957–1959); orange with a brown-white-brown stripe sequence and brown numerals on the sides (1960); orange with a brown-white-brown stripe sequence (1961–1995 and 1999–present).

Over the years, the Browns have had on-and-off periods of wearing white for their home games, particularly in the 1970s and 80s, as well as in the early 2000s after the team returned to the league. Until recently, when more NFL teams have started to wear white at home at least once a season, the Browns were the only non-subtropical team north of the Mason–Dixon line to wear white at home on a regular basis.

Secondary numerals (called "TV numbers") first appeared on the jersey sleeves in 1961. Over the years, there have been minor revisions to the sleeve stripes, the first occurring in 1968 (brown jerseys worn in early season) and 1969 (white and brown jerseys) when stripes began to be silkscreened onto the sleeves and separated from each other to prevent color bleeding. However, the basic five-stripe sequence has remained intact (with the exception of the 1984 season). A recent revision was the addition of the initials "AL" to honor team owner Al Lerner who died in 2002; this was removed in 2013 upon Jimmy Haslam assuming ownership of the team.

Orange pants with a brown-white-brown stripe sequence were worn from 1975 to 1983 and become symbolic of the "Kardiac Kids" era. The orange pants were worn again occasionally in 2003 and 2004.

Other than the helmet, the uniform was completely redesigned for the 1984 season. New striping patterns appeared on the white jerseys, brown jerseys and pants. Solid brown socks were worn with brown jerseys and solid orange socks were worn with white jerseys. Brown numerals on the white jerseys were outlined in orange. White numerals on the brown jerseys were double outlined in brown and orange. (Orange numerals double outlined in brown and white appeared briefly on the brown jerseys in one pre-season game.) However, this particular uniform set was not popular with the fans, and in 1985 the uniform was returned to a look similar to the original design. It remained that way until 1995.

In 1999, the expansion Browns adopted the traditional design with two exceptions: first, the TV numbers, previously on the sleeves, were moved to the shoulders; and second, the orange-brown-orange pants stripes were significantly widened.

Experimentation with the uniform design began in 2002. An alternate orange jersey was introduced that season as the NFL encouraged teams to adopt a third jersey, and a major design change was made when solid brown socks appeared for the first time since 1984 and were used with white, brown and orange jerseys. Other than 1984, striped socks (matching the jersey stripes) had been a signature design element in the team's traditional uniform. The white striped socks appeared occasionally with the white jerseys in 2003–2005 and 2007.

Experimentation continued in 2003 and 2004 when the traditional orange-brown-orange stripes on the white pants were replaced by two variations of a brown-orange-brown sequence, one in which the stripes were joined (worn with white jerseys) and the other in which they were separated by white (worn with brown jerseys). The joined sequence was used exclusively with both jerseys in 2005. In 2006, the traditional orange-brown-orange sequence returned.

Additionally in 2006, the team reverted to an older uniform style, featuring gray face masks; the original stripe pattern on the brown jersey sleeves (The white jersey has had that sleeve stripe pattern on a consistent basis since the 1985 season.) and the older, darker shade of brown.

The Browns wore brown pants for the first time in team history on August 18, 2008, preseason game against the New York Giants. The pants contain no stripes or markings. The team had the brown pants created as an option for their away uniform when they integrated the gray facemask in 2006. They were not worn again until the Browns "family" scrimmage on August 9, 2009, with white-striped socks. The Browns have continued to wear the brown pants throughout the 2009 season. Browns quarterback Brady Quinn supported the team's move to wearing the brown pants full-time, claiming that the striped pattern on the white pants "prohibit[ed] mobility". However, the fans generally did not like the brown pants, and after being used for only one season, the team returned to their white shirt-on-white pants in 2010. Coach Eric Mangini told The Plain Dealer the Browns will not use the brown pants anymore. "It wasn't very well received," Mangini said. "I hope we can get to the point where we can wear fruit on our heads and people wouldn't notice." At the time, the brown pants weren't officially dropped by the team, but simply not used.

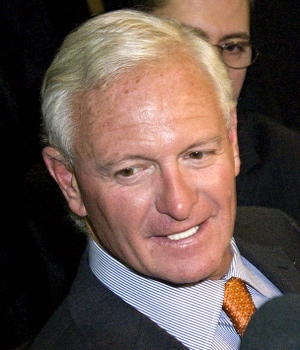
Senior member of the owning family, Jimmy Haslam

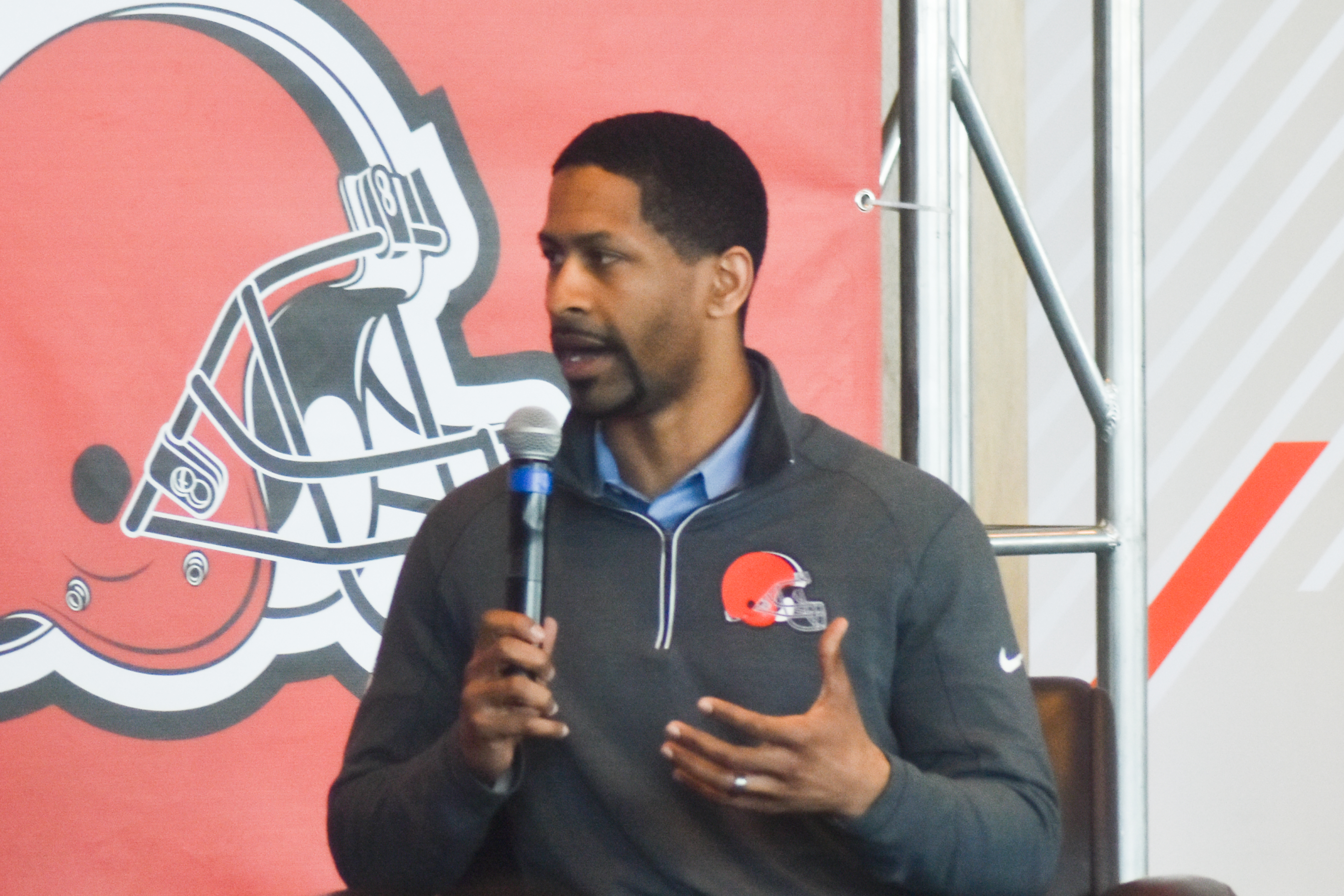
EVP of football operations/GM Andrew Berry

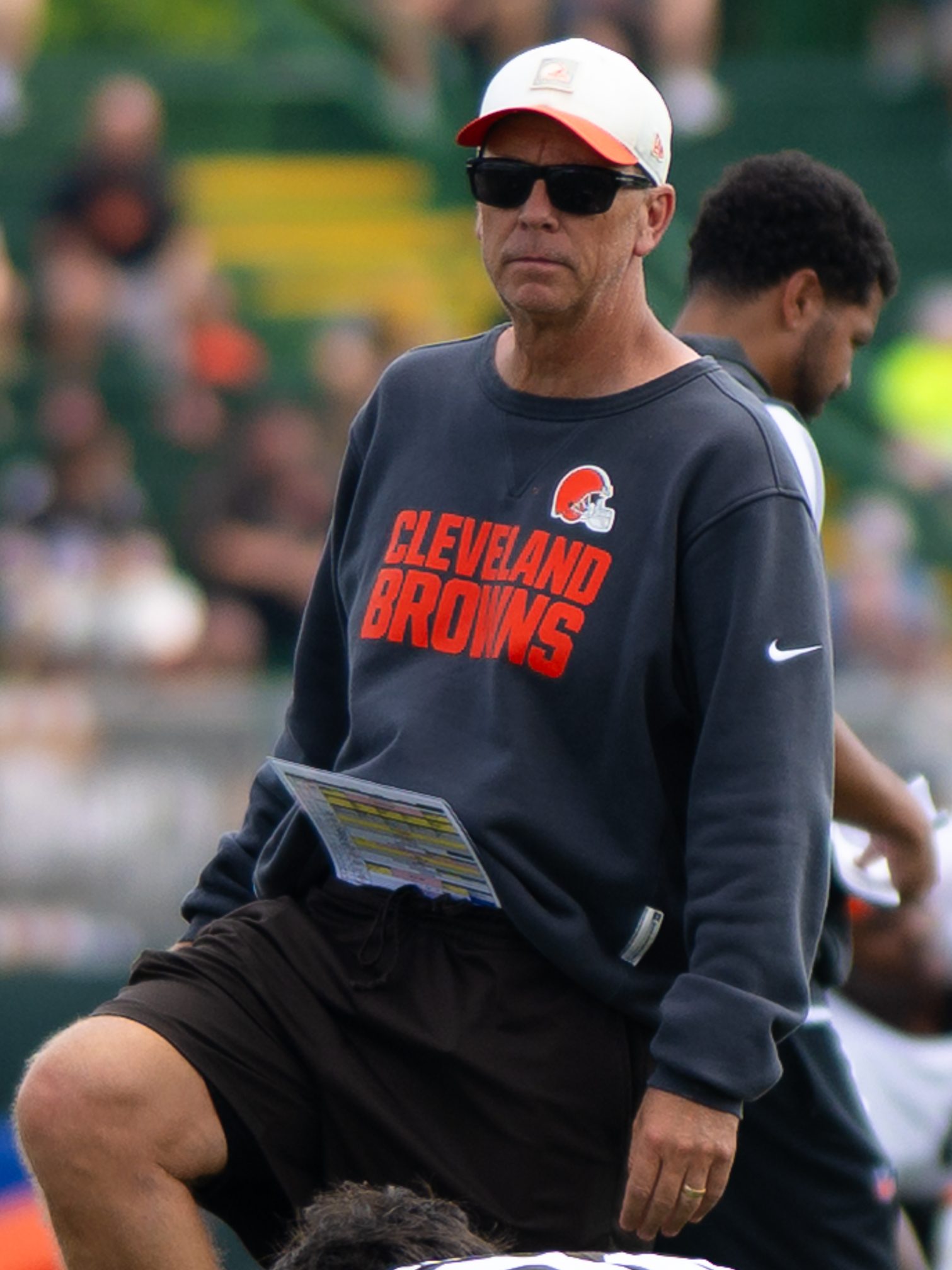
Head coach Todd Monken

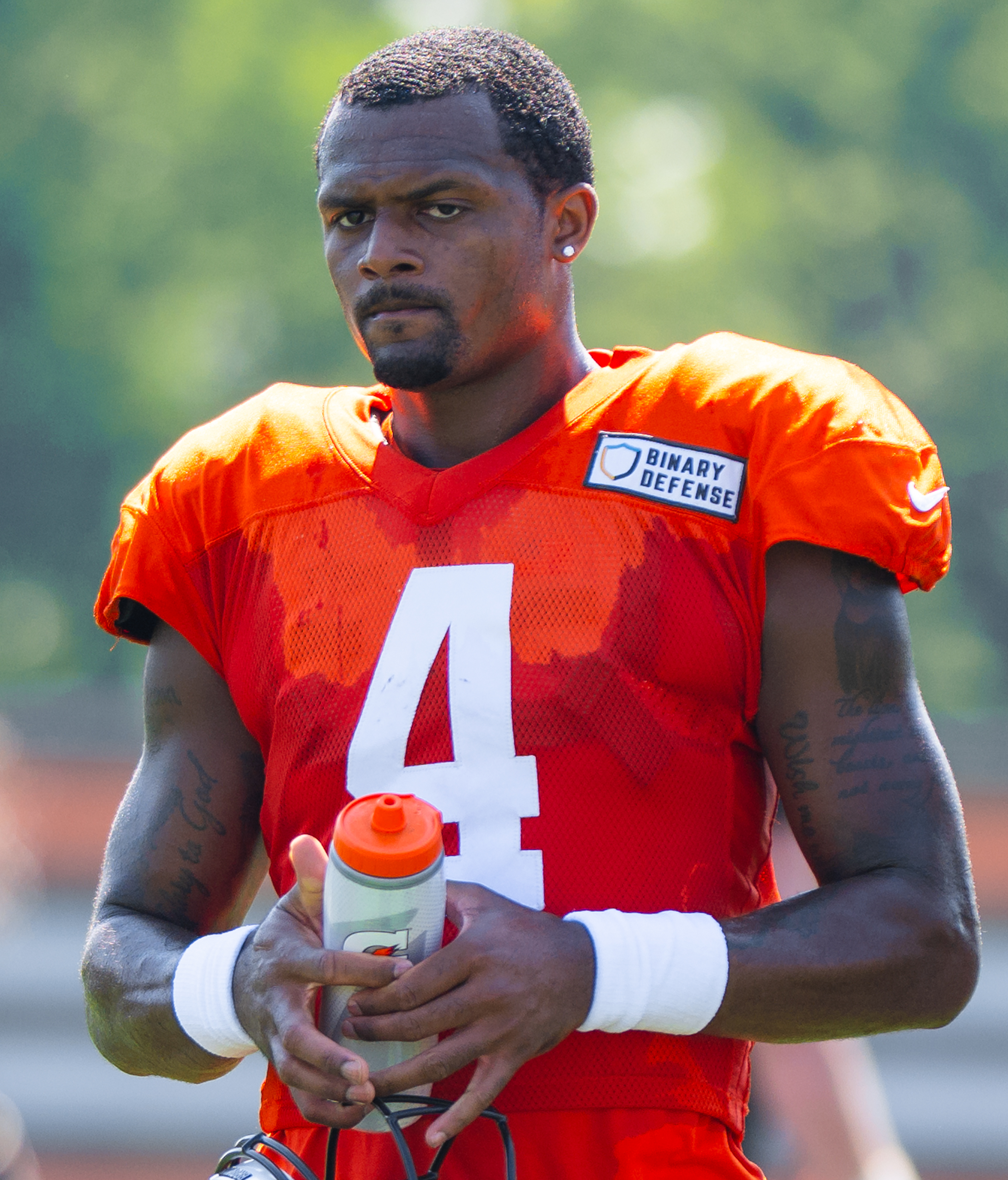
Starting quarterback Deshaun Watson

The Browns chose to wear white at home for the 2011 season, and wound up wearing white for all 16 games as when they were on the road, the home team would wear their darker colored uniform.

The Browns brought back the brown pants in their home game against the Buffalo Bills on October 3, 2013, on Thursday Night Football, pairing them with the brown jerseys. It marked the first time the team wore an all-brown combination in team history.

On April 14, 2015, the Cleveland Browns unveiled their new uniform combinations, consisting of the team's colors of orange, brown and white, but with the slight altering of the orange color to a slightly darker, but more vibrant matte orange (noticeable on the helmet, which featured a seal brown facemask), and seal brown and white, with orange numerals which featured a dropshaw (brown on the white road and orange alternate and white on the home brown jerseys). Above the jersey numerals, the word "CLEVELAND" appeared emblazoned in brown (orange on the home brown and white on the orange alternate jerseys) in a custom sans-serif font type.

The Browns brought back the all-brown look for the NFL Color Rush program in 2016, minus the white elements. In 2018, despite the Color Rush program being discontinued, the uniform was worn at home three times. For the 2019 season, the Browns promoted this uniform to their primary home uniform and donned it for six home games as well as any away game in which the home team wore white.

The club unveiled a new uniform design for the 2020 season. The new uniform design pays homage to the Browns' classic uniform design from years past.

In 2023, the Browns introduced new "White Out" uniforms, an all-white uniform, featuring a white helmet, that will be worn during select home games. This will mark the first time since 1950 the Browns will have non-orange helmets. The white helmets, which will feature an orange stripe down the middle flanked by two brown stripes (basically inverting the regular helmet's colors), are an homage to the early years of the franchise. The white uniforms themselves were a throwback to the 1946 season, and were first worn in 2021 in celebration of the Browns' 75th anniversary season.

Before the 2025 season, the Browns unveiled a second alternate helmet, featuring a matte brown finish with a brown stripe flanked by two orange stripes. This helmet would be worn with the all-brown Color Rush uniform, which was last worn in 2022 and lacked the striping of the regular uniforms.

== Rivalries ==
The Browns have rivalries with all three of their AFC North opponents. In addition, the team has had historical rivalries with the Denver Broncos, Detroit Lions, San Francisco 49ers, and Houston Oilers/Tennessee Titans.

=== Divisional rivalries ===
==== Pittsburgh Steelers ====
Often called the "Turnpike Rivalry", the Browns' biggest rival has long been the Pittsburgh Steelers. Former Browns owner Art Modell scheduled home games against the Steelers on Saturday nights from 1964 to 1970 to help fuel the rivalry. The rivalry has also been fueled by the proximity of the two teams, number of championships both teams have won, players and personnel having played and/or coached for both sides, and personal bitterness. The teams have played twice annually since 1950, making it the oldest rivalry in the AFC and the fifth-oldest rivalry in the NFL. Though the Browns dominated this rivalry early in the series (winning the first eight meetings and posting a 31–9 record in the 1950s and 1960s), the Steelers went 15–5 in the 1970s and 36–9–1 since the Browns returned to the league in 1999. The Steelers have been particularly dominant in Pittsburgh, posting a 44–7 record when hosting the Browns since 1970, including two winning streaks of 16 games (1970–85) and 17 games (2004–20).

The Steelers currently hold a 79–61–1 lead. The Browns and Steelers met in the playoffs in 1994, 2002, and 2020, with the Steelers holding a 2–1 lead in the postseason series. Though the rivalry has cooled in Pittsburgh due to the Modell move as well as the Browns' poor play since 1999, the Steelers still remain the top rival for Cleveland.

==== Cincinnati Bengals ====
Originally conceived due to the personal animosity between Paul Brown and Art Modell, the "Battle of Ohio" between the Browns and the Cincinnati Bengals has been fueled by the sociocultural differences between Cincinnati and Cleveland, a shared history between the two teams, and similar team colors, as Brown used the exact shade of orange for the Bengals that he used for the Browns. (Though this has changed since then, as the Bengals now use a brighter shade of orange.) Modell, in fact, moved the Browns to the AFC after the AFL–NFL merger in order to have a rivalry with the Bengals. The rivalry has also produced two of the eleven highest-scoring games in NFL history. Cincinnati has the all-time edge 52–48. While the Bengals have a 28–21 edge since the Browns returned to the NFL in 1999, this series has been more competitive than the Browns' series with their other division rivals. As of the end of the 2025 season, the Browns have won 9 of the last 11 meetings.

==== Baltimore Ravens ====
Created as a result of the Browns' relocation controversy, the rivalry between the Browns and Baltimore Ravens was more directed at Art Modell than the team itself, and is simply considered a divisional game in Baltimore. This matchup is more bitter for Cleveland than the others due to the fact that the draft picks for 1995 to 1998 resulted in the rosters that won the Super Bowl for the Ravens in 2000. Had Modell not moved the team, these teams, drafted by general manager and former Browns tight end Ozzie Newsome, might have given the Browns a title after a 35-year drought. As of the 2023 season, the Ravens lead the overall series 36–14. The two teams have not met in the playoffs.

=== Other rivalries ===
==== Detroit Lions ====
The Browns' rivalry with the Detroit Lions began in the 1950s, when the Browns and Lions played each other in four NFL Championship Games. The Lions won three of those championships, while the Browns won one. This was arguably one of the NFL's best rivalries in the 1950s. Since the AFL–NFL merger of 1970, the teams have met much less frequently with the Browns' move to the AFC. From 2002 to 2014, the two teams played an annual preseason game known as the "Great Lakes Classic". As of the 2023 season, the Lions lead the all-time series 19–6.

==== Denver Broncos ====
The Browns had a brief rivalry with the Denver Broncos that arose from three AFC Championship Games from 1986 to 1989. In the 1986 AFC Championship, quarterback John Elway led The Drive to secure a tie in the waning moments at Cleveland Municipal Stadium; the Broncos went on to win in 23–20 in overtime. One year later, the two teams met again in the 1987 AFC Championship game at Mile High Stadium. Denver took a 21–3 lead, but Browns quarterback Bernie Kosar threw four touchdown passes to tie the game at 31–31 halfway through the 4th quarter. After a long drive, John Elway threw a 20-yard touchdown pass to running back Sammy Winder to give Denver a 38–31 lead. Cleveland advanced to Denver's 8-yard line with 1:12 left, but Broncos safety Jeremiah Castille stripped Browns running back Earnest Byner of the football at the 2-yard line—a play that has been called The Fumble by Browns fans. The Broncos recovered it, gave Cleveland an intentional safety, and went on to win 38–33. The two teams met yet again in the 1989 AFC Championship at Mile High Stadium, which the Broncos easily won by a score of 37–21.

This short-lived rivalry also featured a controversial 16–13 Browns win at Cleveland Municipal Stadium in the 1989 regular season. The game was decided by a Matt Bahr 48-yard field goal as time expired—a kick that barely cleared the crossbar. Bahr's field goal came after referee Tom Dooley ordered the teams to switch ends of the field midway through the 4th quarter, thanks to rowdy Dawg Pound fans who pelted the Broncos with dog biscuits, eggs, and other debris. The switch gave the Browns a small, timely wind advantage to finish the game.

More recently, the rivalry has cooled off as the Broncos won 11 straight meetings from 1991 to 2015 before Cleveland broke that streak with a narrow 17–16 win in 2018. As of the 2023 season, Denver leads the overall series, 25–7.

==== San Francisco 49ers ====
The most competitive team in the AAFC era for the Browns was the San Francisco 49ers. San Francisco finished second to the Browns in each of the four seasons that the league played. Two of the Browns' four losses in that era were to the 49ers (including a loss that ended the Browns' 29-game unbeaten streak); the rivalry did not last into the NFL years, particularly after the teams were placed in opposite conferences in 1970. The rivalry has turned into a friendly relationship as many 49ers personnel helped the Browns relaunch in 1999, specifically former 49ers president and CEO Carmen Policy and vice president/director of football operations Dwight Clark, who were hired by the expansion Browns in the same roles. In addition, 49ers owners John York and Denise DeBartolo York reside in Youngstown, 60 miles (97 km) southeast of Cleveland. Long-time Browns placekicker and fan favorite Phil Dawson and backup quarterback Colt McCoy signed with the 49ers in 2014. As of the 2023 season, the Browns lead the all-time series 20–10.

==== Houston Oilers/Tennessee Titans ====
The Browns' rivalry with the Houston Oilers/Tennessee Titans dates back to the Browns and then-Oilers being placed in the AFC Central after the AFL–NFL merger in 1970. As such, the teams played each other twice annually from 1970 until 2002 when divisional realignment placed the Browns in the AFC North and the now-Titans in the AFC South (excluding 1996–98 when the Browns were inactive). The teams have met much less frequently since 2002. The Browns lead the overall series 37–32, and the 69 meetings with the Oilers/Titans are the third-most of any Cleveland opponent, trailing only the Steelers and Bengals.

The height of this rivalry was during the 1980s. Oilers head coach Jerry Glanville and Marty Schottenheimer shared several bitter exchanges during the decade and the Browns and Oilers had their only playoff meeting in the 1988 Wild Card Round, in which the Oilers came away with a narrow 24–23 victory. There have been a few memorable games in recent years. In 2014, the Browns erased a 28–3 deficit to come away with a 29–28 win. In a December 2020 contest with playoff implications for both teams, the Browns jumped to a 38–7 halftime lead, setting a franchise record for points in the first half. However, Tennessee rallied in the second half but came up just short as the Browns hung on for a 41–35 win.

== Fan base ==
A 2006 study conducted by Bizjournal determined that Browns fans are the most loyal fans in the NFL. The study, while not scientific, was largely based on fan loyalty during winning and losing seasons, attendance at games, and challenges confronting fans (such as inclement weather or long-term poor performance of their team). The study noted that Browns fans filled 99.8% of the seats at Huntington Bank Field during the last seven seasons, despite a combined record of 36–76 over that span.

=== Dawg Pound ===
Perhaps the most visible Browns fans are those that can be found in the Dawg Pound. Originally the name for the bleacher section located in the open (east) end of old Cleveland Municipal Stadium, the current incarnation is likewise located in the east end of Huntington Bank Field and still features hundreds of orange and brown clad fans sporting various canine-related paraphernalia. The fans adopted that name in 1984 after members of the Browns defense used it to describe the team's defense.

Retired cornerback Hanford Dixon, who played his entire career for the Browns (1981–1989), is credited with naming the Cleveland Browns defense 'The Dawgs' in the mid-1980s. Dixon and teammates Frank Minnifield and Eddie Johnson would bark at each other and to the fans in the bleachers at the Cleveland Stadium to fire them up. It was from Dixon's naming that the Dawg Pound subsequently took its title. The fans adopted that name in the years after. Due to this nickname, since the team's revival the Browns have used a bulldog as an alternate logo.

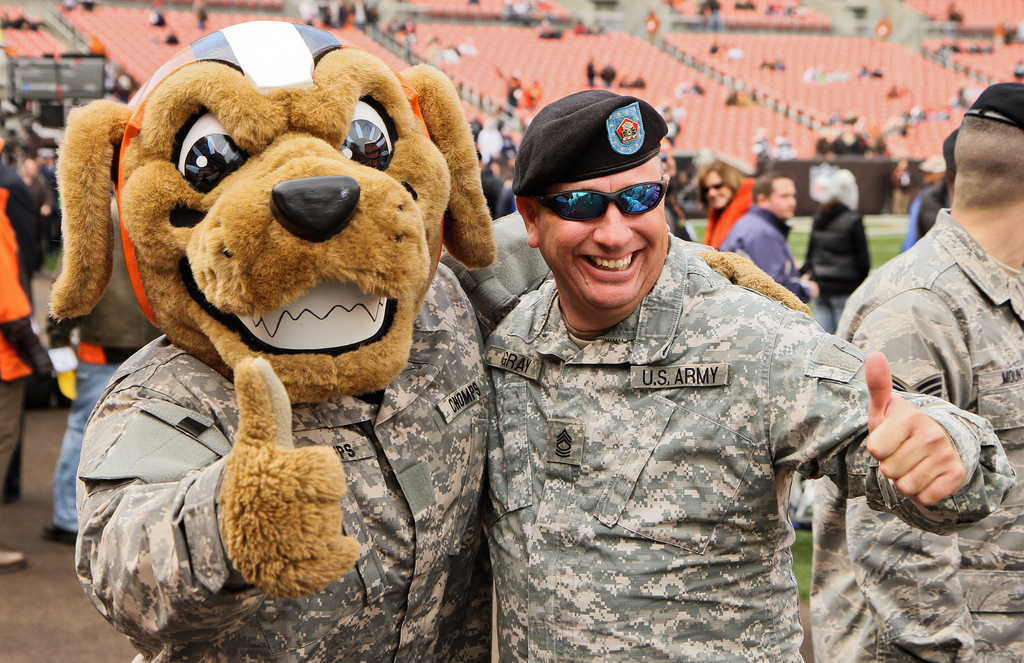
Browns mascot Chomps shown in 2010 greeting U.S. National Guard members at a home game

=== Browns Backers ===
The most prominent organization of Browns fans is the Browns Backers Worldwide (BBW). The organization has approximately 305,000 members and Browns Backers clubs can be found in every major city in the United States, and in a number of military bases throughout the world, with the largest club being in Phoenix, Arizona. In addition, the organization has a sizable foreign presence in places as far away as Egypt, Australia, Japan, Sri Lanka, and McMurdo Station in Antarctica. According to The Official Fan Club of the Cleveland Browns, the two largest international fan clubs are in Alon Shvut, West Bank and Niagara, Canada, with Alon Shvut having 129 members and Niagara having 310.

After former Browns owner Randy Lerner's acquisition of English soccer club Aston Villa, official Villa outlets started selling Cleveland Browns goods such as jerseys and NFL footballs. This has raised interest in England and strengthened the link between the two sporting clubs. Aston Villa supporters have set up an organization known as the Aston (Villa) Browns Backers of Birmingham.

== Players of note ==
=== Current roster ===
Cleveland Browns roster
Quarterbacks (QB): 6 Dillon Gabriel; 15 Taylen Green; 2 Shedeur Sanders; 4 Deshaun Watson; Running backs (RB): 10 Quinshon Judkins; 38 Jaleel McLaughlin; 22 Dylan Sampson; Wide receivers (WR): 0 Isaiah Bond; 12 Denzel Boston; 1 KC Concepcion PR; 11 Malachi Corley KR; 3 Jerry Jeudy; 16 Tylan Wallace; Tight ends (TE): 44 Harold Fannin Jr.; 86 Blake Whiteheart	Offensive linemen (OL): 58 Austin Barber T; 52 Parker Brailsford C; 55 Spencer Fano T; 71 Tytus Howard T; 74 Elgton Jenkins C; 77 Zion Johnson G; 79 Dawand Jones T; 56 Luke Wypler C; 70 Zak Zinter G; Defensive linemen (DL): 97 Derek Barnett DE; 96 Maliek Collins DT; 94 Mason Graham DT; 51 Mike Hall Jr. DT; 98 Adin Huntington DE; 92 Sam Kamara DE; -- Jamree Kromah DE; 57 Isaiah McGuire DE; 8 Jared Verse DE; 54 Sam Williams DE	Linebackers (LB): 17 Justin Jefferson; 42 Easton Mascarenas-Arnold; 59 Winston Reid; 49 Carson Schwesinger; 5 Quincy Williams; Defensive backs (DB): 29 Mekhi Blackmon CB; 7 Tyson Campbell CB; 9 Grant Delpit S; 26 Myles Harden CB; 33 Ronnie Hickman S; 20 Noah Igbinoghene CB; 31 Donovan McMillon S; 28 Emmanuel McNeil-Warren S; 35 Toriano Pride Jr. CB; 24 Daniel Thomas S; 21 Denzel Ward CB; Special teams (ST): 13 Corey Bojorquez P; 50 Rex Sunahara LS; 25 Andre Szmyt K	Practice squad: 43 Krys Barnes LB; 64 Austin Blaske G; 39 Michael Coats Jr. CB; 68 Obinna Eze T (IPP); 99 Logan Fano DE; 88 Xavier Guillory WR; 27 Hassan Haskins RB; 19 Jimmy Horn Jr. WR; 72 KT Leveston T; 69 Zion Logue DT; 80 Zaire Mitchell-Paden TE; 36 Wes Pahl P; 90 Khordae Sydnor DE; 66 Xavier Truss T; 60 Nadame Tucker DE; 30 Zion Washington S; 40 Nathaniel Watson LB (PS/I); Reserve: 34 Michael Burton FB (IR); 93 Kalia Davis DT (IR); 78 Teven Jenkins G (IR); 37 Damarri Mathis CB (IR); 6 Jeremiah Owusu-Koramoah LB (PUP); 18 Joe Royer TE (NF-Ill.); 23 Raheim Sanders RB (IR); 54 Edefuan Ulofoshio MLB (IR); 91 Alex Wright DE (IR) 53 active, 15 practice squad (1 IPP), 10 reserve As of November 17, 2026. Rookies in italics.; Roster; Depth chart; Transactions

=== Players enshrined in the Pro Football Hall of Fame ===
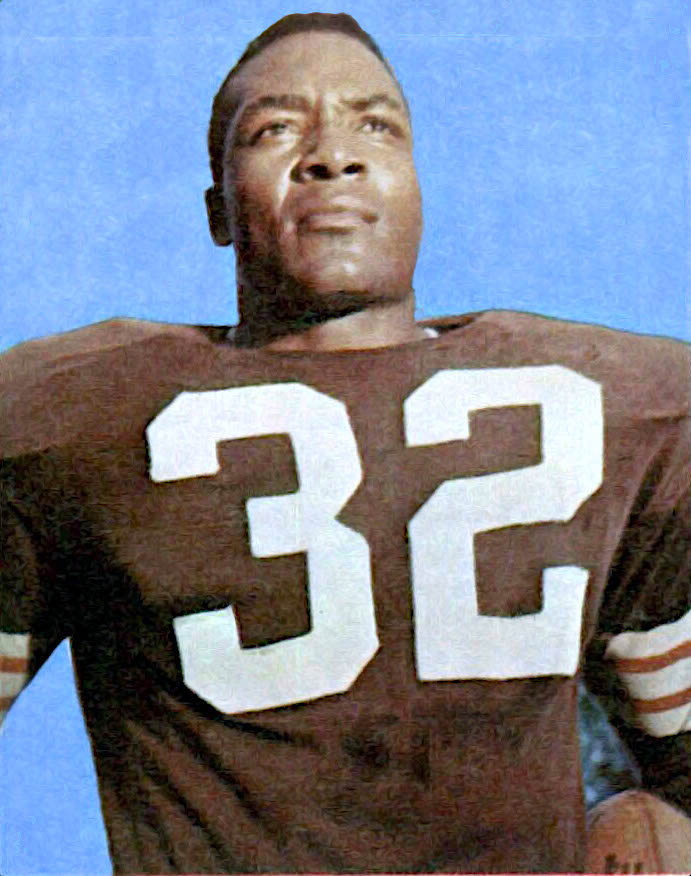
Hall of Fame FB Jim Brown

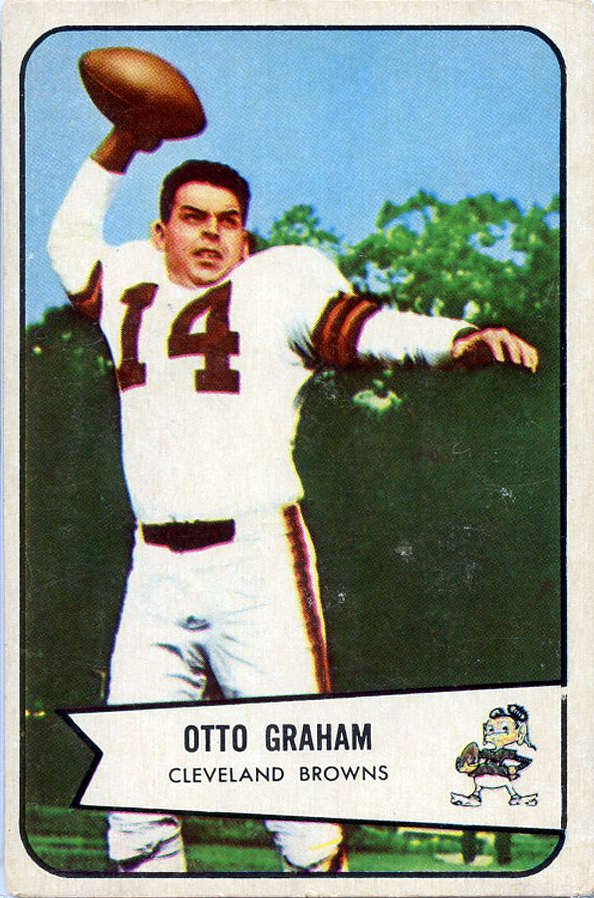
Hall of Fame QB Otto Graham

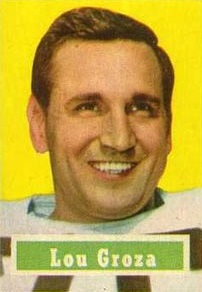
Hall of Fame K/OT Lou Groza

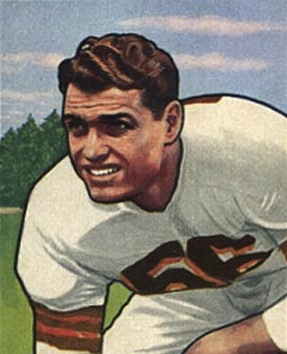
Hall of Fame WR Dante Lavelli

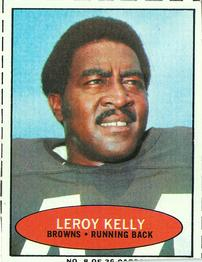
Hall of Fame RB Leroy Kelly

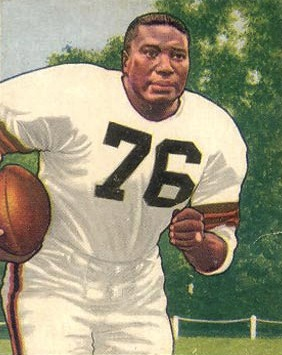
Hall of Fame FB Marion Motley

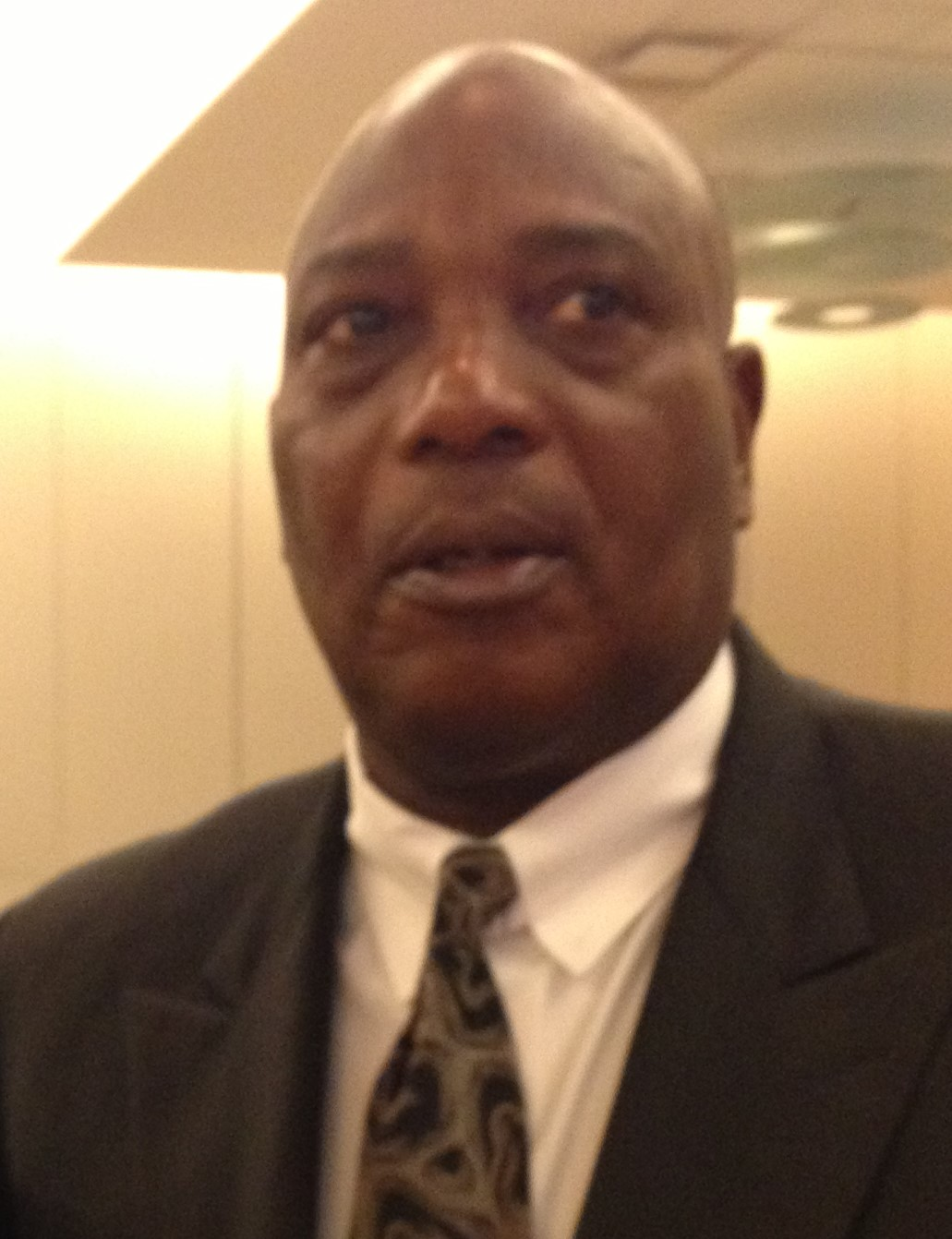
Hall of Fame TE Ozzie Newsome

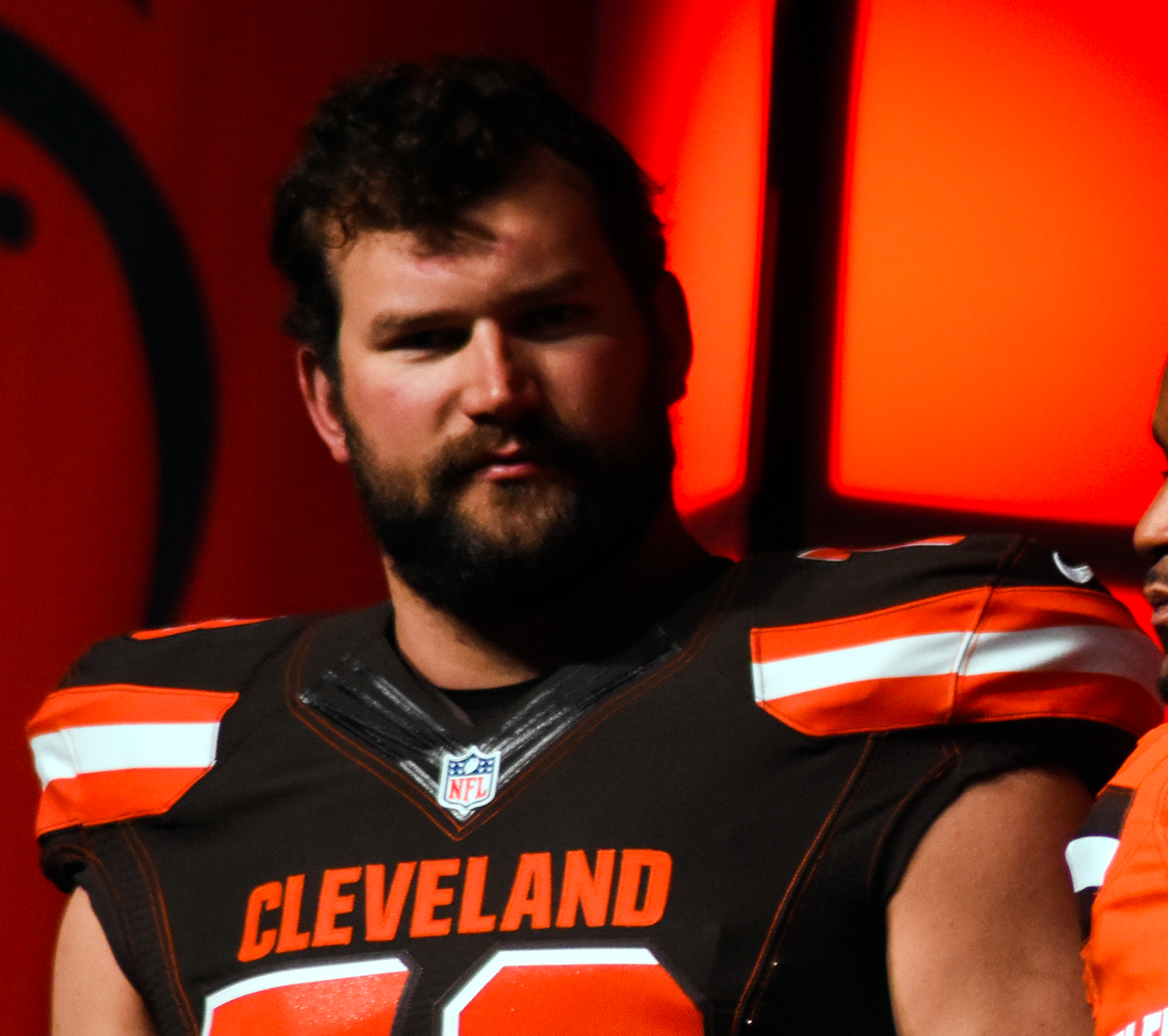
Hall of Fame LT Joe Thomas

The Cleveland Browns have the fourth-largest number of players enshrined in the Pro Football Hall of Fame with a total of 17 enshrined players elected based on their performance with the Browns, and nine more players or coaches elected who spent at least one year with the Browns franchise. No Browns players were inducted in the inaugural induction class of 1963. Otto Graham was the first Browns player to be enshrined as a member of the class of 1965, and the most recent Browns player to be included in the Pro Football Hall of Fame is Joe Thomas, who was a member of the class of 2023, who is the first member inducted that played in the 21st century.

Cleveland Browns in the Pro Football Hall of Fame
Inducted	No.	Player name	Tenure	Position(s)
1965	60, 14	Otto Graham	1946–1955	QB
1967	—	Paul Brown	1946–1962	Head coach
1968	76, 36	Marion Motley	1946–1953	FB
1971	32	Jim Brown	1957–1965	FB
1974	46, 76	Lou Groza	1946–1959; 1961–1967	OT; K
1975	56, 86	Dante Lavelli	1946–1956	WR
1976	53, 80	Len Ford	1950–1957	DE
1977	30, 45, 60	Bill Willis	1946–1953	T, OG
1981	77	Willie Davis ^{*}	1958–1959	DE
1982	83	Doug Atkins	1953–1954	DE
1983	49	Bobby Mitchell	1958–1961	WR, RB, HB
1983	42	Paul Warfield	1964–1969; 1976–1977	WR
1984	74	Mike McCormack	1954–1962	OT
1985	22, 52	Frank Gatski	1946–1956	C
1987	18	Len Dawson	1960–1961	QB
1994	44	Leroy Kelly	1964–1973	RB
1995	72	Henry Jordan	1957–1958	DT
1998	29	Tommy McDonald	1968	WR
1999	82	Ozzie Newsome	1978–1990	TE
2003	64	Joe DeLamielleure	1980–1984	OG
2007	66	Gene Hickerson	1958–1960; 1962–1973	OG
2020	58, 88	Mac Speedie	1946–1952	End
2023	73	Joe Thomas	2007–2017	OT

=== Cleveland Browns legends ===
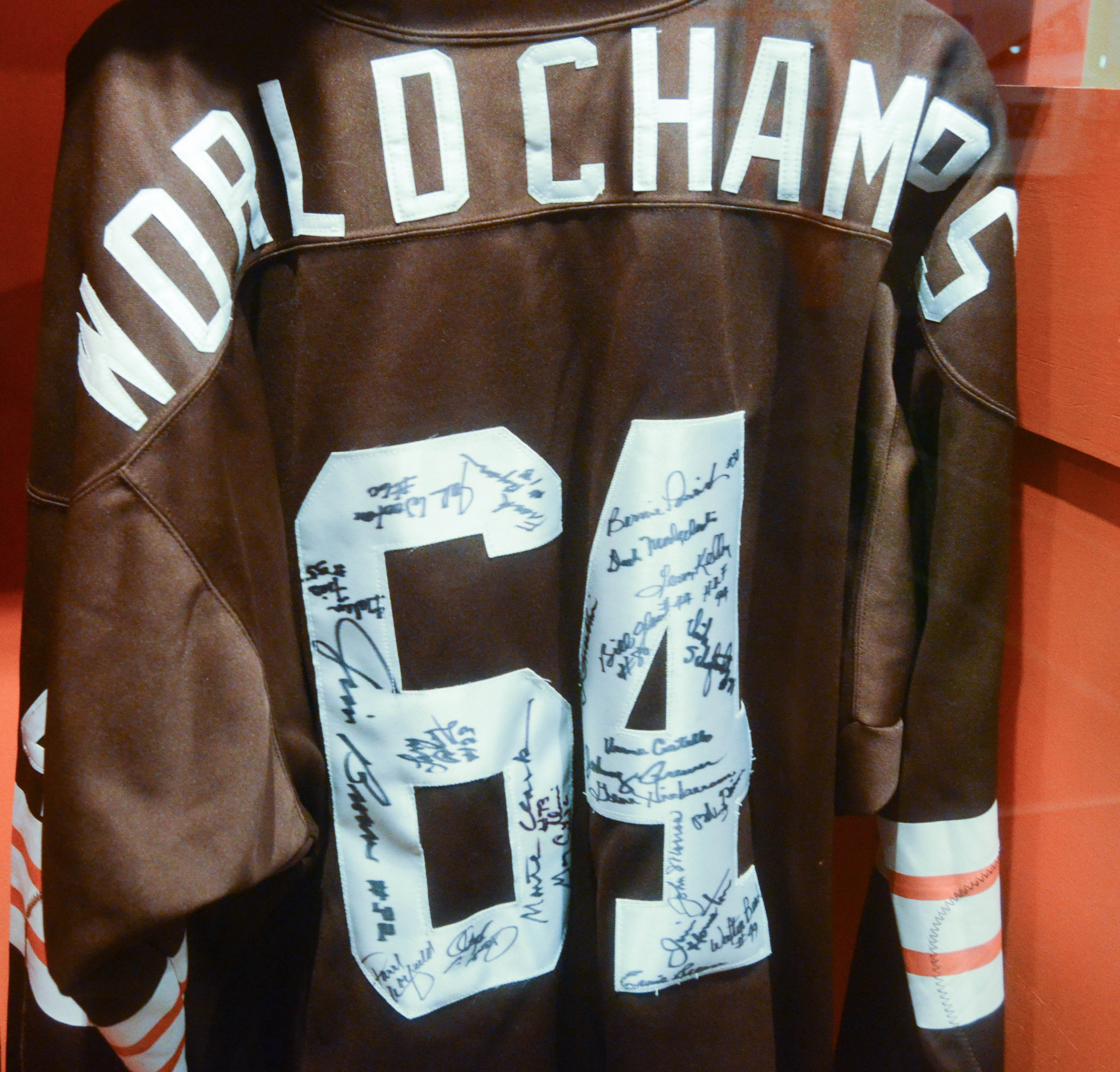
1964 Cleveland Browns NFL Champions jersey signed by the team's players

The Cleveland Browns legends program honors former Browns who made noteworthy contributions to the history of the franchise. In addition to all the Hall of Famers listed above, the Legends list includes:

Cleveland Browns legends
Inducted	No.	Player name	Position(s)	Tenure
2001	19	Bernie Kosar	QB	1985–1993
2001	92	Michael Dean Perry	DE	1989–1994
2001	34	Greg Pruitt	RB	1973–1981
2001	26	Ray Renfro	WR	1952–1963
2002	57	Clay Matthews	LB	1978–1993
2002	17	Brian Sipe	QB	1974–1983
2003	29	Hanford Dixon	CB	1981–1989
2003	74/79	Bob Gain	DT	1952–1964
2003	77/80	Dick Schafrath	OT	1959–1971
2004	86	Gary Collins	WR	1962–1971
2004	42/82	Tommy James	P	1948–1955
2004	40/86	Dub Jones	WR	1948–1955
2004	43	Mike Pruitt	RB	1976–1984
2005	31	Frank Minnifield	CB	1984–1992
2005	13	Frank Ryan	QB	1962–1968
2005	72	Jerry Sherk	DT	1970–1981
2005	64/84	Jim Ray Smith	OT	1956–1962
2006	20/21/44	Earnest Byner	RB	1984–1988; 1994–1995
2006	73	Doug Dieken	OT	1971–1984
2006	82	Jim Houston	LB	1960–1972
2006	34	Walt Michaels	LB	1952–1961
2007	12	Don Cockroft	K	1968–1980
2007	59/84	Horace Gillom	P	1947–1956
2007	80	Bill Glass	DE	1962–1968
2007	34	Kevin Mack	RB	1985–1993
2008	71	Walter Johnson	DT	1965–1976
2008	24/80	Warren Lahr	DB	1949–1959
2008	21	Eric Metcalf	RB/KR	1989–1994
2008	84/86	Paul Wiggin	DE	1957–1967
2010	63	Cody Risien	OT	1979–1989
2010	60	John Wooten	OG	1959–1967
2011	50	Vince Costello	LB	1957–1966
2011	54	Tom DeLeone	C	1974–1984
2012	22	Clarence Scott	S	1971–1983
2012	48	Ernie Green	RB	1962–1968
2013	35	Galen Fiss	LB	1956–1966
2013	34/64	Abe Gibron	G	1950–1956
2014	68	Robert Jackson	G	1975–1985
2014	89	Milt Morin	TE	1966–1975
2015	70	Don Colo	DT	1953–1958
2015	79	Bob Golic	NT	1982–1988
2016	52	Dick Ambrose	LB	1975–1983
2016	27	Thom Darden	FS	1972–1981
2017	30	Bernie Parrish	DB	1959–1966
2017	74	Tony Adamle	LB/FB	1947–1951, 1954
2018	40	Erich Barnes	DB	1965–1971
2018	51	Eddie Johnson	LB	1981–1990
2020	16	Josh Cribbs	WR/KR	2005–2012
2020	84	Webster Slaughter	WR	1986–1991
2021	52/58	D'Qwell Jackson	LB	2006–2013
2021	16	Bill Nelsen	QB	1968–1972
2022	82/88	Pete Brewster	TE	1952–1958
2022	73	Joe Thomas	OT	2007–2017
2024	4	Phil Dawson	K	1999–2012
2024	--	Jim Donovan	Voice of the Browns	1999-2023
2026	86	Brian Brennan	WR	1984-1991
2026	55	Alex Mack	C	2009-2015
2026	44	Lou Rymkus	OT	1946-1951

=== Retired uniform numbers ===
Cleveland Browns retired numbers

Otto Graham; QB, 1946–1955

Jim Brown; FB, 1957–1965

Ernie Davis; HB, 1962

Don Fleming; S, 1960–1962

Lou Groza; OT/K, 1946–1959, 1961–1967

=== Ring of Honor ===
Beginning in 2010, the Browns established a Ring of Honor, honoring the greats from the past by having their names displayed around the upper deck of Huntington Bank Field. The inaugural class in the Browns Ring of Honor was unveiled during the home opener on September 19, 2010, and featured the 16 Hall of Famers listed above who went into the Hall of Fame as Browns. In 2018, Joe Thomas was entered into the Ring of Honor with the number 10,363 – commemorating his NFL record of consecutive snaps played on offense. In 2019, four-time Pro Bowl linebacker Clay Matthews Jr. was entered into the Ring of Honor.

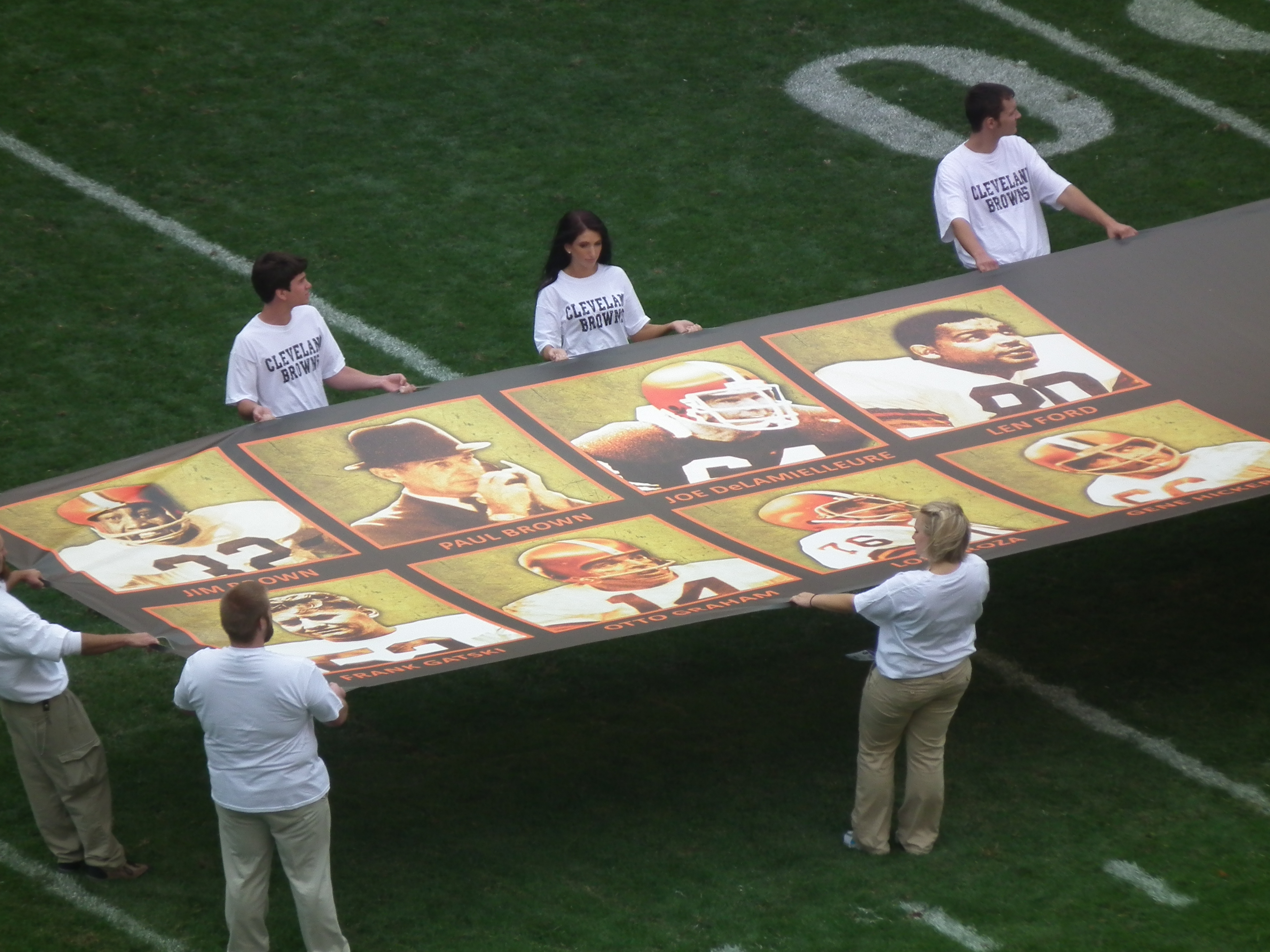

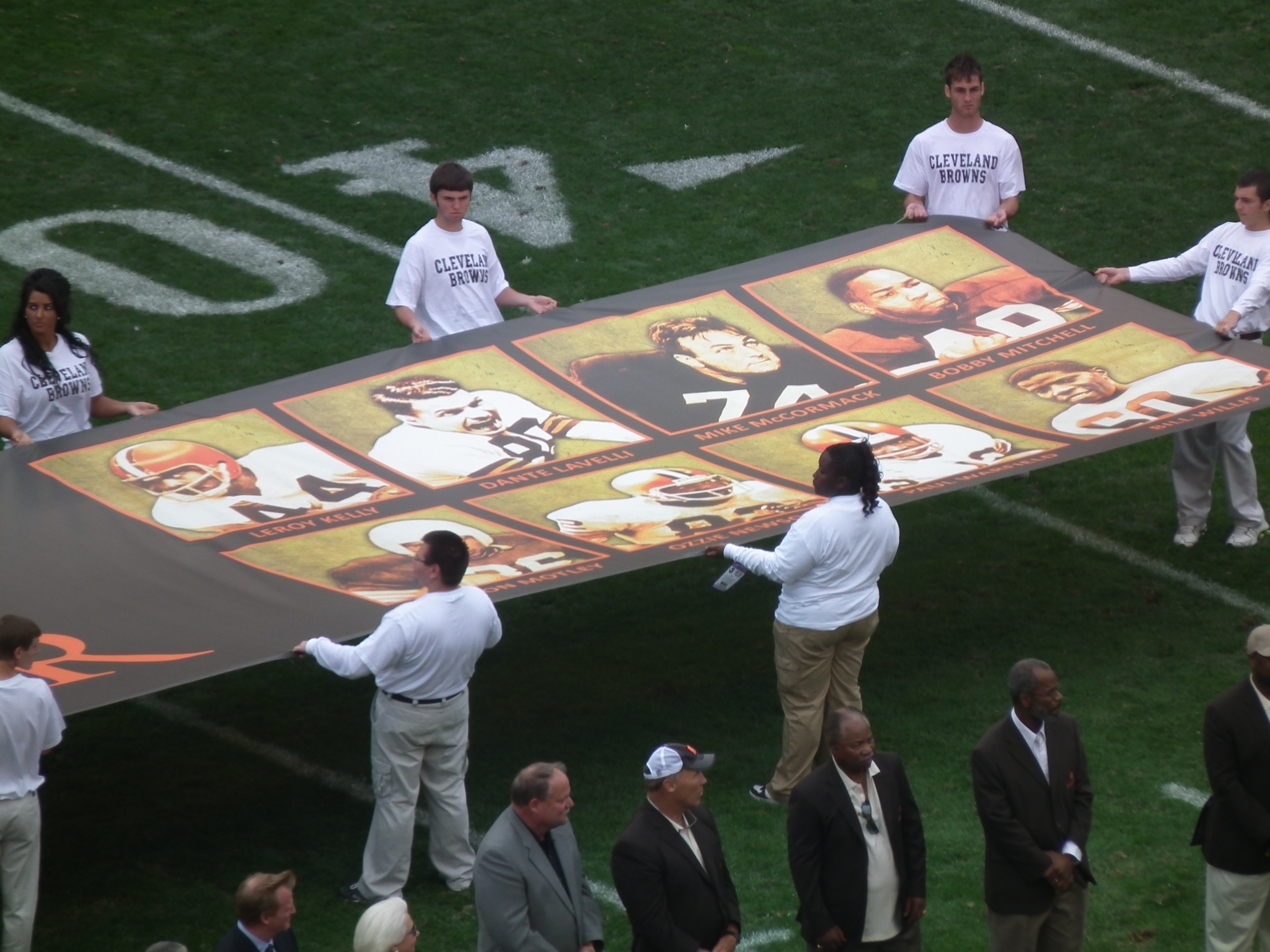
Banner unveiled during halftime of the Chiefs–Browns game depicting the first sixteen inductees of the Cleveland Browns Ring of Honor, September 2010

Cleveland Browns Ring of Honor
Inducted	No.	Name	Position(s)	Tenure
2010	32	Jim Brown	FB	1957–1965
2010	—	Paul Brown	Head coach	1946–1962
2010	64	Joe DeLamielleure	OG	1980–1984
2010	53, 80	Len Ford	DE	1950–1957
2010	22, 52	Frank Gatski	C	1946–1956
2010	60, 14	Otto Graham	QB	1946–1955
2010	46, 76	Lou Groza	OT; K	1946–1959; 1961–1967
2010	66	Gene Hickerson	OG	1958–1960; 1962–1973
2010	44	Leroy Kelly	RB	1964–1973
2010	56, 86	Dante Lavelli	WR	1946–1956
2010	74	Mike McCormack	OT	1954–1962
2010	49	Bobby Mitchell	WR, RB, HB	1958–1961
2010	76, 36	Marion Motley	FB	1946–1953
2010	82	Ozzie Newsome	TE	1978–1990
2010	42	Paul Warfield	WR	1964–1969; 1976–1977
2010	30, 45, 60	Bill Willis	T, OG	1946–1953
2018	73	Joe Thomas	OT	2007–2017
2019	57	Clay Matthews	LB	1978–1993
2021	58, 88	Mac Speedie	WR	1946–1952

=== Statues ===
Numerous Browns players and staff have had statues made in their honor:

In and around Huntington Bank Field

- 1964 NFL Champion and Hall of Fame running back Jim Brown – since 2016
- Three-time NFL Champion and Hall of Fame quarterback Otto Graham – since 2019

In and around Cleveland

- Late owner Alfred Lerner in front of the team's headquarters/practice facility in Berea, Ohio – since 2003
- Browns Hall of Fame offensive tackle/kicker Lou Groza in front of a youth football field that bears his name, also in Berea – since 2016

=== Murals ===
Browns players featured on murals in downtown Cleveland include:

- Jim Brown (along with other Cleveland dignitaries as under the banner "Cleveland is The Reason")
- Myles Garrett (depicted as a child with his grandmother in Playhouse Square)

=== Streets ===
- The street near Huntington Bank Field in Cleveland was renamed "Alfred Lerner Way" in 2002 after the late owner.
- The street in Berea, Ohio where the Browns headquarters and practice facility are located is named "Lou Groza Boulevard".

=== First-round draft picks ===
As of the 2023 season, the Browns have had the first overall pick in the NFL draft on five occasions: 1954, 1999, 2000, 2017, and 2018.

== Coaches of note ==
=== Head coaches ===
The Browns have had 22 head coaches serve in the capacity.

=== Current staff ===
Cleveland Browns staff
Ownership: Principal partners – Jimmy Haslam, Dee Haslam; Managing partner – Whitney Haslam Johnson; Partner/Executive vice president – J. W. Johnson; Limited partner – Charles Woodson; Front office: President – David Jenkins; Executive vice president of football operations/general manager – Andrew Berry; Vice president of football operations/assistant general manager – Catherine Hickman; Assistant GM/Vice president of player personnel – Glenn Cook; Senior vice president of football administration – Chris Cooper; Director of football administration – Taylor Young; Vice president, player personnel process and development – Ken Kovash; Director of player personnel – Adam Al-Khayyal; Director of college scouting – Max Paulus; Senior personnel executive – Jimmy Raye III, Chris Polian; Advisor, scouting assessment and development – Kathleen Wood; Personnel advisor – Tom Telesco; Senior football advisor – Ryan Grigson; Director of personnel operations – Megan Rock; Director of football operations & process – Joy Tapajcik; Vice President of research and strategy – Dave Giuliani; Director of scouting research – Zach Wigmore; Head coaches: Head coach – Todd Monken; Offensive coaches: Offensive coordinator – Travis Switzer; Pass game coordinator – Danny Breyer; Quarterbacks – Mike Bajakian; Assistant quarterbacks – Matt Baker; Running backs – Duce Staley; Wide receivers – Christian Jones; Assistant wide receivers – John Wozniak; Tight ends/run game coordinator – Jeff Blasko; Offensive line – George Warhop; Assistant offensive line – Bobby Johnson; Offensive assistant/offensive line – Sanders Davis; Offensive quality control – Ian Kolste; Offensive analyst – Travis Monken; Offensive analyst – Dom Borsani	Defensive coaches: Defensive coordinator – Mike Rutenberg; Defensive passing game coordinator – Ephraim Banda; Defensive line – Jacques Cesaire; Assistant defensive line – Ralph Street; Linebackers/run game coordinator – Jason Tarver; Defensive backs/pass game specialist – Brandon Lynch; Senior defensive assistant – Dom Capers; Defensive assistant/nickelbacks – Jeff Anderson; Defensive assistant/assistant linebackers – Zach Dunn; Defensive quality control – Paul Worrilow; Defensive analyst – Shaq Wilson; Special teams coaches: Special teams coordinator – Byron Storer; Assistant special teams – Keith Tandy; Strength and conditioning: Director, strength and conditioning – Larry Jackson; Player Development Coordinator – Anthony Fabiano; Assistant strength and conditioning/sports science – Josh Christovich; Assistant strength and conditioning – Monty Gibson; Assistant strength and conditioning – Dale Jones; Assistant strength and conditioning – Ty Taylor; Assistant of Performance Nutrition – Grace Kennedy; Director of performance nutrition – Kelsey Fahy; → Coaching staff → Front office → More NFL staffs

== Media ==
Radio

WKNR (850 AM), WKRK-FM (92.3 FM), and WNCX (98.5 FM) serve as co-flagship stations for the Cleveland Browns Radio Network.

The Browns broadcast team includes play-by-play announcer Andrew Siciliano, commentator Nathan Zegura – who made news when he had to serve an eight-game suspension due to arguing with officials during a game in 2018 when he was sideline reporter, and former NFL player and current WKNR host Je'Rod Cherry, who serves as sideline analyst/reporter. Cherry, WKRK's Ken Carman and Andy Baskin, and Cleveland area native/former NFL player Tyvis Powell host the network pregame show, while WKRK's Jeff Phelps and Powell host the network postgame show.

Spanish language broadcasts are heard on their own separate network of stations, with WJMO 1300 AM serving as the flagship, with announcers Rafa Hernández-Brito and Octavio Sequera.

TV

Cleveland ABC affiliate WEWS-TV 5 serves as the broadcast TV home of the Browns, airing year-round team programming as well as all non-network preseason games, with the broadcast team of Chris Rose (play-by-play), Pro Football Hall of Famer Joe Thomas (analyst), and Aditi Kinkhabwala (sidelines).

Honors

The Browns in-house production team won a pair of Lower Great Lakes Emmy Awards in 2005. One was for a primetime special honoring the 1964 NFL Championship team (The 1964 Championship Show) and one was for a commercial spot (The Paperboy).

== References in popular culture ==
The Browns have (either directly or indirectly) been featured in various movies and TV shows over the years. Notable examples include:

- Cleveland native Arsenio Hall's television program, The Arsenio Hall Show, is known for the audience's shouting "Woof, woof, woof!" while pumping their fists—a chant that was used by fans of the Browns. He would refer to a section of the live audience as his "Dawg Pound".
- On Living Single, Overton Wakefield Jones (John Henton) is a die-hard Cleveland Browns fan. On the episode "Living Single Undercover" season 4, episode 20 (aired April 10, 1997), Overton is sore over the Browns moving to Baltimore becoming the Ravens. Henton was born and raised in Cleveland, like his character on the show. Jim Brown guest starred in that episode.
- On The Drew Carey Show, Browns quarterback Bernie Kosar appears (uncredited) in the episode "Drewstock" (aired January 29, 1997). In the episode "Drew Goes To The Browns Game" (aired September 29, 1999), Drew attends the Browns' first regular-season game since re-joining the NFL. (In real life, Drew Carey actually did appear on-field at the first regular-season game when the team returned in 1999.)
- Cleveland Brown is the name of a character originally featured on the Fox TV show Family Guy, and the central character of the spin-off series The Cleveland Show.
- On the TV show How I Met Your Mother, in the seventh-season premiere, the main characters go to a Cleveland Browns-themed wedding.
- The Browns have been featured on some level in episodes of Hot in Cleveland and even in promotional videos using at least one of the main characters. In the episode "How Did You Guys Meet, Anyway?" (January 4, 2012), the characters reminisce about how they met in the 1980s while waiting in the restroom line at a Cleveland Browns game. In the episode "God and Football" (January 18, 2012), Melanie (Valerie Bertinelli) develops a relationship with the Browns placekicker (played by Dan Cortese). In the episode "The Gateway Friend" (May 2, 2012) Browns wide receiver/return specialist Josh Cribbs appears as himself portraying a karaoke contestant. After Super Bowl XLVI, Betty White appears in a video as Elka wearing a Browns jacket congratulating the New York Giants and hoping that the Browns win it one season. After the first round of the 2014 NFL draft, the four main characters appear in a video welcoming Justin Gilbert and Johnny Manziel to the Browns.
- The 1966 film The Fortune Cookie with Jack Lemmon and Walter Matthau features the Browns and the city of Cleveland throughout the movie and was made with the cooperation of the Browns.
- The 2008 film The Express: The Ernie Davis Story explains how Ernie Davis is traded to the Browns by the Washington Redskins. Early in the film, Jim Brown is taking photos in his Browns uniform after being drafted by them. Later in the film, it shows Davis struggling with leukemia after being drafted and the Browns hold a special pre-game ceremony for him.
- In the 2010 film Hot Tub Time Machine, the Browns defeat the Broncos and win the 1986 AFC Championship Game (the game famous for former Denver Broncos quarterback John Elway's 98-yard drive). It is explained that the reason why the Browns win this game is due to the butterfly effect.
- In the 2014 film Draft Day, fictional Browns general manager Sonny Weaver, Jr. (Kevin Costner) attempts to land the number one pick in the NFL draft.

== Season-by-season record ==
Preceded by League formed	AAFC champions 1946, 1947, 1948, 1949	Succeeded by League dissolved (team joined NFL)
Preceded by Philadelphia Eagles	NFL champions 1950	Succeeded by Los Angeles Rams
Preceded by Detroit Lions	NFL champions 1954, 1955	Succeeded by New York Giants
Preceded by Chicago Bears	NFL champions 1964	Succeeded by Green Bay Packers
