= 2006–07 Aston Villa F.C. season =

English football club season

Aston Villa
2006–07 season
- Chairman: Randy Lerner
- Manager: Martin O'Neill
- FA Premier League: 11th
- FA Cup: Third round
- League Cup: Fourth round
- Top goalscorer: League: Gabriel Agbonlahor (9); All: Gareth Barry; Gabriel Agbonlahor (10)
- Highest home attendance: 42,551 (vs. Tottenham, Man Utd, Liverpool, Sheff Utd)
- Lowest home attendance: 27,450 (vs. Bolton)
- Average home league attendance: 36,214
Home colours	Away colours

Second City Derby
- 50--36--28

The 2006–07 English football season was Aston Villa's 15th season in the Premier League. It was Villa's first season under the management of Northern Irishman Martin O'Neill, who was appointed as manager following the sacking of David O'Leary at the end of the previous season.

Villa started life under Martin O'Neill strongly and were the last team in the Premier League to be beaten, going nine matches without defeat and taking points against the likes of Arsenal and Chelsea away before a 3–1 loss at Liverpool. A run of 11 games without victory during the middle of the season dragged Villa down to 14th place, putting paid to their early-season hopes of Champions League qualification, but Villa rallied and only lost 3 of their last 15 games to finish comfortably in 11th.

There were debuts for Ashley Young (210), Stiliyan Petrov (185), John Carew (113), Shaun Maloney (30), Isaiah Osbourne (19), Phil Bardsley (13), Chris Sutton (8), Didier Agathe (5), and Gábor Király (5).

Kit Supplier	Sponsor
Hummel	32Red.com

== Boardroom ==
In August 2006, it was confirmed Randy Lerner had reached a £62.6m agreement with Aston Villa to take over the club. The statement to the London Stock Exchange confirmed that 60% of the club's shares, including the 39% stake of Doug Ellis had been sold to Lerner, beating competition from consortia led by Michael Neville, Nicholas Padfield QC, and Athole Still. Eleven days after the announcement, the LSE confirmed that Lerner had secured 59.69% of Villa shares, making him the majority shareholder. Lerner appointed himself Chairman of the Board of the club. The BBC reported in September 2006 that Lerner had moved closer to taking full control of the club, after increasing his share to 85.5%.

By the time that the deadline passed in September 2006, Lerner had secured the acceptance of 89.69% of the shareholders. Due to the acceptance only being 0.31% below the conditional limit, Lerner accepted it and made the bid unconditional. On September 19, 2006, Aston Villa PLC executive chairman Doug Ellis and his board resigned, and were replaced by Randy Lerner as chairman with General Charles C. Krulak, Bob Kain and Michael Martin serving as non-executive directors. At the close of the deal in 2006, Lerner became only the second American owner of a Premiership club. Ellis became a President Emeritus (Life President) of the club.

== Premier League ==
Pos	Team	Pld	W	D	L	GF	GA	GD	Pts	Qualification or relegation
9	Portsmouth	38	14	12	12	45	42	+3	54	
10	Blackburn Rovers	38	15	7	16	52	54	−2	52	Qualification for the Intertoto Cup third round (Note: The highest-placed team who applied for the Intertoto Cup and not in an automatic UEFA Cup spot was awarded with a place in that competition. Blackburn Rovers occupied the Intertoto place, because Portsmouth and Reading did not apply. A further place in the UEFA Cup was up for grabs via the Premiership Fair Play League. The winner is placed into a draw with the winners of Fair Play leagues in other countries. The representatives from the two countries that come out of the hat first are given a place in the UEFA Cup first qualifying round. Since the winners of the Premiership Fair Play League, Tottenham Hotspur, had already qualified for the UEFA Cup by virtue of their league position, their place in the Fair Play draw was given to Aston Villa. However, the places in the UEFA Cup were awarded to the representatives from Finland and Norway.)
11	Aston Villa	38	11	17	10	43	41	+2	50	
12	Middlesbrough	38	12	10	16	44	49	−5	46	
13	Newcastle United	38	11	10	17	38	47	−9	43	

Source: Barclays Premier League
Rules for classification: 1) points; 2) goal difference; 3) number of goals scored.

=== Matches ===
Matchday	1	2	3	4	5	6	7	8	9	10	11	12	13	14	15	16	17	18	19	20	21	22	23	24	25	26	27	28	29	30	31	32	33	34	35	36	37	38
Ground	A	H	H	A	A	H	A	H	H	A	H	A	A	H	H	A	A	H	H	A	A	H	A	H	A	H	A	H	A	H	H	A	H	A	H	A	H	A
Result	D	W	W	D	D	W	D	D	D	L	W	W	D	D	L	D	D	L	L	L	L	D	L	W	L	W	L	L	D	D	D	W	D	W	D	W	W	D
Position	10	6	3	5	5	5	7	6	7	7	6	4	5	6	6	8	8	9	10	10	12	13	15	14	14	13	13	13	13	13	14	13	14	11	11	11	11	11

Source: worldfootball.net
A = Away; H = Home; W = Win; D = Draw; L = Loss

19 August 2006 1	Arsenal	1–1	Aston Villa	Islington, London
15:00	Gilberto 84'	Report	Mellberg 53'	Stadium: Emirates Stadium; Attendance: 60,023; Referee: Graham Poll

23 August 2006 2	Aston Villa	2–1	Reading	Birmingham, West Midlands
	Ángel 34' (pen.); Barry 61'	Report	Doyle 4'; Sonko (red card) 34'	Stadium: Villa Park; Attendance: 37,329; Referee: Lee Mason

27 August 2006 3	Aston Villa	2–0	Newcastle United	Birmingham, West Midlands
	Moore 3'; Ángel 38'	Report		Stadium: Villa Park; Attendance: 35,141; Referee: Howard Webb

10 September 2006 4	West Ham United	1–1	Aston Villa	Newham, London
16:00	Mullins (yellow card) 45'; Zamora 52'; Zamora (yellow card) 58'	Report	Ridgewell 4'; Barry (yellow card) 26'; McCann (yellow card) 55'	Stadium: Boleyn Ground; Attendance: 34,576; Referee: Steve Bennett

16 September 2006 5	Watford	0–0	Aston Villa	Watford, Hertfordshire
		Report		Stadium: Vicarage Road; Attendance: 18,620; Referee: Mike Dean

23 September 2006 6	Aston Villa	2–0	Charlton Athletic	Birmingham, West Midlands
	Agbonlahor 35'; Moore 62'	Report		Stadium: Villa Park; Attendance: 35,513; Referee: Mike Riley

30 September 2006 7	Chelsea	1–1	Aston Villa	Fulham, London
	Drogba 3'	Report	Agbonlahor 45'	Stadium: Stamford Bridge; Attendance: 41,951; Referee: Graham Poll

14 October 2006 8	Aston Villa	1–1	Tottenham Hotspur	Birmingham, West Midlands
	Barry 81'	Report	Davenport (red card) 73'; Ángel 76' (o.g.)	Stadium: Villa Park; Attendance: 42,551; Referee: Martin Atkinson

21 October 2006 9	Aston Villa	1–1	Fulham	Birmingham, West Midlands
	Barry 26' (pen.)	Report	Volz 45'	Stadium: Villa Park; Attendance: 30,919; Referee: Chris Foy

28 October 2006 10	Liverpool	3–1	Aston Villa	Liverpool, Merseyside
	Kuyt 31'; Crouch 38'; Luis García 44'	Report	Agbonlahor 56'	Stadium: Anfield; Attendance: 44,117; Referee: Steve Bennett

5 November 2006 11	Aston Villa	2–0	Blackburn Rovers	Birmingham, West Midlands
	Barry 41' (pen.); Ángel 50'	Report		Stadium: Villa Park; Attendance: 30,089; Referee: Howard Webb

11 November 2006 12	Everton	0–1	Aston Villa	Liverpool, Merseyside
		Report	Sutton 42'	Stadium: Goodison Park; Attendance: 36,376; Referee: Phil Dowd

19 November 2006 13	Wigan Athletic	0–0	Aston Villa	Wigan, Greater Manchester
		Report		Stadium: JJB Stadium; Attendance: 18,455; Referee: Steve Bennett

25 November 2006 14	Aston Villa	1–1	Middlesbrough	Birmingham, West Midlands
	Barry 45' (pen.)	Report	Christie 43'	Stadium: Villa Park; Attendance: 33,162; Referee: Peter Walton

29 November 2006 15	Aston Villa	1–3	Manchester City	Birmingham, West Midlands
	McCann 66'	Report	Vassell 18'; Barton 32'; Distin 75'	Stadium: Villa Park; Attendance: 30,124; Referee: Mike Dean

2 December 2006 16	Portsmouth	2–2	Aston Villa	Portsmouth, Hampshire
	Taylor 52', 80'; Pedro Mendes (red card) 86'	Report	Barry 37' (pen.); Ángel 82'	Stadium: Fratton Park; Attendance: 20,042; Referee: Uriah Rennie

11 December 2006 17	Sheffield United	2–2	Aston Villa	Sheffield, Yorkshire
	Quinn 50'; Webber 64'	Report	Petrov 2'; Baroš 65'	Stadium: Bramall Lane; Attendance: 30,957; Referee: Mark Halsey

16 December 2006 18	Aston Villa	0–1	Bolton Wanderers	Birmingham, West Midlands
		Report	Speed 75' (pen.)	Stadium: Villa Park; Attendance: 27,450; Referee: Mark Clattenburg

23 December 2006 19	Aston Villa	0–3	Manchester United	Birmingham, West Midlands
		Report	Ronaldo 58', 85'; Scholes 64'	Stadium: Villa Park; Attendance: 42,551; Referee: Steve Bennett

26 December 2006 20	Tottenham Hotspur	2–1	Aston Villa	Haringey, London
	Defoe 67', 77'	Report	Barry 81'	Stadium: White Hart Lane; Attendance: 35,293; Referee: Uriah Rennie

30 December 2006 21	Charlton Athletic	2–1	Aston Villa	Greenwich, London
	D. Bent 57'; Hughes 90'	Report	Barry 40' (pen.) (red card) 61'	Stadium: The Valley; Attendance: 26,699; Referee: Rob Styles

2 January 2007 22	Aston Villa	0–0	Chelsea	Birmingham, West Midlands
		Report		Stadium: Villa Park; Attendance: 41,006; Referee: Phil Dowd

13 January 2007 23	Manchester United	3–1	Aston Villa	Trafford, Greater Manchester
	Park 11'; Carrick 13'; Ronaldo 35'	Report	Agbonlahor 52'	Stadium: Old Trafford; Attendance: 76,073; Referee: Howard Webb

20 January 2007 24	Aston Villa	2–0	Watford	Birmingham, West Midlands
	Mahon 86' (o.g.); Agbonlahor 90'	Report		Stadium: Villa Park; Attendance: 35,892; Referee: Peter Walton

31 January 2007 25	Newcastle United	3–1	Aston Villa	Newcastle upon Tyne, Tyneside
	Milner 5'; Dyer 7'; Sibierski 90'	Report	Young 25'	Stadium: St. James' Park; Attendance: 49,201; Referee: Howard Webb

3 February 2007 26	Aston Villa	1–0	West Ham United	Birmingham, West Midlands
	Carew 36'	Report		Stadium: Villa Park; Attendance: 41,202; Referee: Chris Foy

10 February 2007 27	Reading	2–0	Aston Villa	Reading, Berkshire
	Sidwell 16', 90'	Report		Stadium: Madejski Stadium; Attendance: 24,122

3 March 2007 28	Fulham	1–1	Aston Villa	Fulham
	Bocanegra 23'	Report	Carew 21'	Stadium: Craven Cottage; Attendance: 24,552; Referee: Lee Mason

14 March 2007 29	Aston Villa	0–1	Arsenal	Birmingham, West Midlands
		Report	Diaby 10'	Stadium: Villa Park; Attendance: 39,968; Referee: Martin Atkinson

18 March 2007 30	Aston Villa	0–0	Liverpool	Birmingham, West Midlands
		Report		Stadium: Villa Park; Attendance: 42,551; Referee: Lee Mason

2 April 2007 31	Aston Villa	1–1	Everton	Birmingham, West Midlands
	Agbonlahor 83'	Report	Lescott 15'	Stadium: Villa Park; Attendance: 36,407; Referee: Howard Webb

7 April 2007 32	Blackburn Rovers	1–2	Aston Villa	Blackburn, Lancashire
	McCarthy 24' (pen.)	Report	Berger 34'; Agbonlahor 73'	Stadium: Ewood Park; Attendance: 24,211; Referee: Martin Atkinson

9 April 2007 33	Aston Villa	1–1	Wigan Athletic	Birmingham, West Midlands
	Agbonlahor 50'	Report	Heskey 21'; Valencia (red card) 34'	Stadium: Villa Park; Attendance: 31,920; Referee: Mark Halsey

14 April 2007 34	Middlesbrough	1–3	Aston Villa	Middlesbrough, North Yorkshire
	Rochemback 13'	Report	Gardner 45'; Moore 70'; Petrov 77'	Stadium: Riverside Stadium; Attendance: 26,959; Referee: Dermot Gallagher

22 April 2007 35	Aston Villa	0–0	Portsmouth	Birmingham, West Midlands
16:00		Report		Stadium: Villa Park; Attendance: 31,745; Referee: Martin Atkinson

28 April 2007 36	Manchester City	0–2	Aston Villa	Manchester
		Report	Carew 24'; Maloney 75'	Stadium: City of Manchester Stadium; Attendance: 40,799; Referee: Mark Halsey

5 May 2007 37	Aston Villa	3–0	Sheffield United	Birmingham, West Midlands
	Agbonlahor 25'; Young 42'; Berger 55'	Report		Stadium: Villa Park; Attendance: 42,551; Referee: Peter Walton

13 May 2007 38	Bolton Wanderers	2–2	Aston Villa	Bolton, Greater Manchester
	Speed 32'; Davies 58'	Report	Gardner 37'; Moore 81'	Stadium: Reebok Stadium; Attendance: 26,255; Referee: Mark Clattenburg

== FA Cup ==
7 January 2007 R3	Manchester United	2–1	Aston Villa	Trafford, Greater Manchester
	Larsson 55'; Solskjær 90'	Report	Baroš 74'	Stadium: Old Trafford; Attendance: 74,924; Referee: Martin Atkinson

== League Cup ==
20 September 2006 R2	Scunthorpe United	1–2	Aston Villa	Scunthorpe, Lincolnshire
	Sharp 73'	Report	Ángel 42', 64'	Stadium: Glanford Park; Attendance: 6,502; Referee: Trevor Kettle

24 October 2006 R3	Leicester City	2–3 (a.e.t.)	Aston Villa	Leicester, East Midlands
	Stearman 42'; Kisnorbo 85'	Report	Ángel 5'; Barry 45' (pen.); Agbonlahor 119'	Stadium: Walkers Stadium; Attendance: 27,288; Referee: Mark Clattenburg

8 November 2006 R4	Chelsea	4–0	Aston Villa	Fulham, London
	Lampard 32'; Shevchenko 65'; Essien 82'; Drogba 84'	Report		Stadium: Stamford Bridge; Attendance: 41,156; Referee: Mark Halsey

== Players ==
Squad at end of season

Note: Flags indicate national team as defined under FIFA eligibility rules; some limited exceptions apply. Players may hold more than one non-FIFA nationality.

No.	Pos.	Nation	Player
1	GK	DEN	Thomas Sørensen
2	DF	WAL	Mark Delaney
3	DF	ENG	Jlloyd Samuel (Note: Samuel was born in San Fernando, Trinidad and Tobago, but also qualified to represent England internationally and represented them at U-21 level before making his full international debut for Trinidad and Tobago in September 2009.)
4	DF	SWE	Olof Mellberg
5	DF	DEN	Martin Laursen
6	MF	ENG	Gareth Barry
8	MF	ENG	Gavin McCann
10	FW	NOR	John Carew
11	MF	BUL	Stiliyan Petrov
12	MF	NIR	Steven Davis
13	GK	ENG	Stuart Taylor
15	FW	ENG	Gabriel Agbonlahor

No.	Pos.	Nation	Player
16	DF	NED	Wilfred Bouma
17	FW	ENG	Ashley Young
18	DF	NIR	Aaron Hughes
19	DF	ENG	Liam Ridgewell
20	FW	ENG	Chris Sutton
21	DF	ENG	Gary Cahill
22	FW	ENG	Luke Moore
23	MF	CZE	Patrik Berger
24	DF	ENG	Phil Bardsley (Note: Bardsley was born in Salford, England, but also qualified to represent Scotland internationally through his father and would make his international debut for Scotland in October 2010.) (on loan from Manchester United)
26	MF	ENG	Craig Gardner
27	MF	ENG	Isaiah Osbourne
28	MF	SCO	Shaun Maloney (Note: Maloney was born in Miri, Malaysia, but was raised in Scotland from the age of 5 and represented them at U-21 level before making his international debut for Scotland in October 2005.)

=== Goals & appearancss ===
No.	Pos.	Name	League		FA Cup		League Cup		Total	
No.	Pos.	Name	Apps	Goals	Apps	Goals	Apps	Goals	Apps	Goals
1	GK	Sorensen	29	0	0	0	2	0	31	0
3	DF	Samuel	2+2	0	0+1	0	0	0	2+3	0
4	DF	Mellberg	38	1	0	0	3	0	41	1
5	DF	Laursen	12+2	0	0	0	1	0	13+2	0
6	MD	Barry	35	8	1	0	3	1	39	9
8	MF	McCann	28+2	1	1	0	2	0	31+2	1
9	FW	Angel	18+5	4	1	0	3	3	22+5	7
10	FW	Baroš	10+7	1	0+1	1	1+2	0	11+10	2
10	FW	Carew	11	3	0	0	0	0	11	3
11	MF	Petrov	30	2	1	0	3	0	34	2
12	MF	Davis	17+11	0	0	0	3	0	20+11	0
13	GK	Taylor	4+2	0	0	0	1	0	5+2	0
14	MF	Djemba-Djemba	0+1	0	0	0	0	0	0+1	0
15	FW	Agbonlahor	37+1	9	1	0	0	0	41+1	10
16	DF	Bouma	23+2	0	1	0	1+1	0	25+3	0
17	FW	Young	11+2	2	0	0	0+1	0	11+2	2
17	MF	Whittingham	2+1	0	0	0	0+1	0	2+2	0
18	DF	Hughes	15+4	0	1	0	3	0	19+4	0
19	DF	Ridgewell	19+2	1	1	0	2+1	0	22+3	1
20	FW	Sutton	6+2	1	0	0	0+1	0	6+3	1
21	DF	Cahill	19+1	1	1	0	0	0	20+1	0
22	FW	Moore	7+6	4	0	0	1	0	8+6	4
23	MF	Berger	5+8	2	0	0	0+1	0	5+9	2
24	DF	Bardsley	13	0	0	0	0	0	13	0
26	MF	Gardner	11+2	2	0	0	0	0	11+2	2
27	MF	Osbourne	6+5	0	1	0	1	0	8+5	0
28	GK	Kiraly	5	0	1	0	0	0	6	0
28	MF	Maloney	5+3	1	0	0	0	0	5+3	1
31	DF	Agathe	0+5	0	0	0	0+1	0	0+6	0

=== Loans & transfers ===
Transferred in

Date	Pos	Player	From	Fee
30 August 2006	CM	(Bulgaria) Stiliyan Petrov	(Scotland) Celtic	£6,500,000
12 September 2006	RM	(Réunion) Didier Agathe	(Scotland) Celtic	Free transfer
3 October 2006	CF	Chris Sutton	Birmingham City	Free transfer
22 January 2007	CF	(Norway) John Carew	(France) Olympique Lyon	£5,000,000 (P/EX)
23 January 2007	LW	Ashley Young	Watford	£9,650,000
31 January 2007	AM	(Scotland) Shaun Maloney	(Scotland) Celtic	£1,000,000
				£22,150,000

Record

Loaned in

Date	Pos	Player	From	Loan End
13 December 2006	GK	(Hungary) Gábor Király	Crystal Palace	8 January 2007
8 January 2007	RB	(Scotland) Phil Bardsley	Manchester United	29 April 2007

Transferred out

Date	Pos	Player	To	Fee
1 July 2006	RB	(Ecuador) Ulises de la Cruz	Reading	Free transfer
1 August 2006	CM	(France) Mathieu Berson	(Spain) Levante	£500,000
22 August 2006	CF	Kevin Phillips	West Bromwich Albion	£700,000
11 January 2007	LM	Peter Whittingham	(Wales) Cardiff City	£350,000
11 January 2007	RM	(Réunion) Didier Agathe	-	Released
22 January 2007	CF	(Czech Republic) Milan Baroš	(France) Olympique Lyon	£5,000,000 (P/EX)
17 April 2007	CF	(Colombia) Juan Pablo Ángel	(United States) New York Red Bulls	Free transfer
				£6,550,000

Loaned out

Date	Pos	Player	To	Loan End
29 September 2006	RM	Lee Hendrie	Stoke City	1 January 2007
29 September 2006	CF	Sam Williams	Brighton & Hove Albion	29 October 2006
20 October 2006	LB	(Republic of Ireland) Stephen O'Halloran	Wycombe Wanderers	21 January 2007
23 November 2006	AM	(Czech Republic) Patrik Berger	Stoke City	1 January 2007
12 January 2007	DM	(Cameroon) Eric Djemba-Djemba	Burnley	31 May 2007
30 January 2007	RM	Lee Hendrie	Stoke City	31 May 2007
8 March 2007	GK	(Austria) Bobby Olejnik	Lincoln City	29 April 2007

Overall transfer activity

Expenditure ▼£22,150,000

Income ▲£6,550,000

Balance ▼£15,600,000

== Pre-season ==
Date	Opponents	Home/ Away	Result F–A	Scorers	Competition
21 July 2006	Walsall	A	5–0	Agbonlahor (2), Moore (2), Whittingham	Friendly
25 July 2006	Hull City	A	2–0	Davis, Gardner	Friendly
26 July 2006	Chesterfield	A	2–0	Bridges (2)	Friendly
29 July 2006	Wolverhampton Wanderers	A	3–0	Ridgewell, Barry, Agbonlahor	Friendly
5 August 2006	Hannover (Germany)	A	0–0		Friendly
8 August 2006	NEC Nijmegen (Netherlands)	A	1–2	Agbonlahor	Friendly
11 August 2006	Groningen (Netherlands)	A	2–2	Moore, Ridgewell	Friendly

== Reserve & youth squad ==
The following players spent most of the season playing for the reserve team, and did not appear for the first team.

Note: Flags indicate national team as defined under FIFA eligibility rules; some limited exceptions apply. Players may hold more than one non-FIFA nationality.

No.	Pos.	Nation	Player
25	GK	AUT	Bobby Olejnik
29	DF	IRL	Stephen O'Halloran
—	DF	ENG	Paul Green

No.	Pos.	Nation	Player
—	MF	BEL	Christian Tshimanga Kabeya (Note: Kabeya was born in Kinshasa, Zaire (now the Democratic Republic of the Congo), but also qualifies to represent Belgium internationally and has represented them at U-16, U-17, U-18 and U-19 level.) (sacked)
—	FW	ENG	Scott Bridges
—	FW	ENG	Sam Williams

Youth squad

The following players spent most of the season playing for the youth team, and did not appear for the first team, but may have appeared for the reserve team.

Note: Flags indicate national team as defined under FIFA eligibility rules; some limited exceptions apply. Players may hold more than one non-FIFA nationality.

No.	Pos.	Nation	Player
—	GK	ENG	Elliot Parish
—	GK	IRL	David Bevan (on loan to Hull City)
—	GK	IRL	Lee Boyle (on loan to Bohemians)
—	GK	IRL	Stephen Henderson
—	DF	ENG	Daniel Bradley
—	DF	ENG	Ciaran Clark (Note: Clark was born in Harrow, England, and represented them at U-17, U-18, U-19, and U-20 level, but also qualifies to represent the Republic of Ireland internationally and would make his international debut for the Republic of Ireland in February 2011.)
—	DF	ENG	Jordan Collins
—	DF	ENG	Ben Love
—	DF	ENG	Will Ricketts
—	DF	ENG	Matthew Roome
—	DF	ENG	Sam Simmonds
—	DF	IRL	Danny Earls
—	DF	IRL	Shane Lowry (Note: Lowry was born in Perth, Australia, but also qualifies to represent the Republic of Ireland internationally through his parents and represented them at U-17, U-19, and U-21 level before switching his international allegiance to Australia.)
—	DF	SWE	Erik Lund

No.	Pos.	Nation	Player
—	DF	AUS	Chris Herd
—	MF	ENG	Marc Albrighton
—	MF	ENG	Jonathan Hogg
—	MF	SCO	Barry Bannan
—	MF	SUI	Damian Bellón
—	MF	SUI	Yagó Bellón
—	MF	HUN	Zoltán Stieber
—	FW	ENG	Nathan Delfouneso
—	FW	NIR	Adam McGurk
—	FW	SWE	Tobias Mikaelsson (on loan to Ljungskile SK)
—	MF	ENG	Josh Burge (on trial from Grimsby Town)
—	DF		Steven Clancy
—	MF		Aaron Griffiths
—	MF		Danny MacDonald (contract terminated by mutual consent)

Other players Note: Flags indicate national team as defined under FIFA eligibility rules; some limited exceptions apply. Players may hold more than one non-FIFA nationality.

No.	Pos.	Nation	Player
—	GK	NOR	Lasse Staw (on trial from Fredrikstad)
—	MF	CYP	Stefanos Georgiou (on trial from Olympiakos Nicosia)
—	MF	CYP	Feidos Panagiotiu (on trial from Olympiakos Nicosia)
—	FW	SWE	Jacob Flingmark (on trial from Ljungskile SK)
—	FW	SWE	Robin Söder (on trial from Stenungsunds IF)

No.	Pos.	Nation	Player
—	MF	ENG	Phil Green
—	DF	IRL	Mark Power
—	DF		Seyi Morgan (contracted cancelled)
—	MF		Morgan Evans
