= Padfield (surname) =

Padfield is an English surname. Notable people with the surname include:

- Nicholas Padfield (born 1947), English barrister and judge
- Nicola Padfield (born 1955), English barrister and legal scholar
- Peter Padfield (1932–2022), British writer, historian and journalist
