= Logos and uniforms of the Cleveland Browns =

This is a gallery of the history of all the revisions made to the uniform jerseys and helmets of the National Football League's Cleveland Browns franchise.

== Logo gallery ==
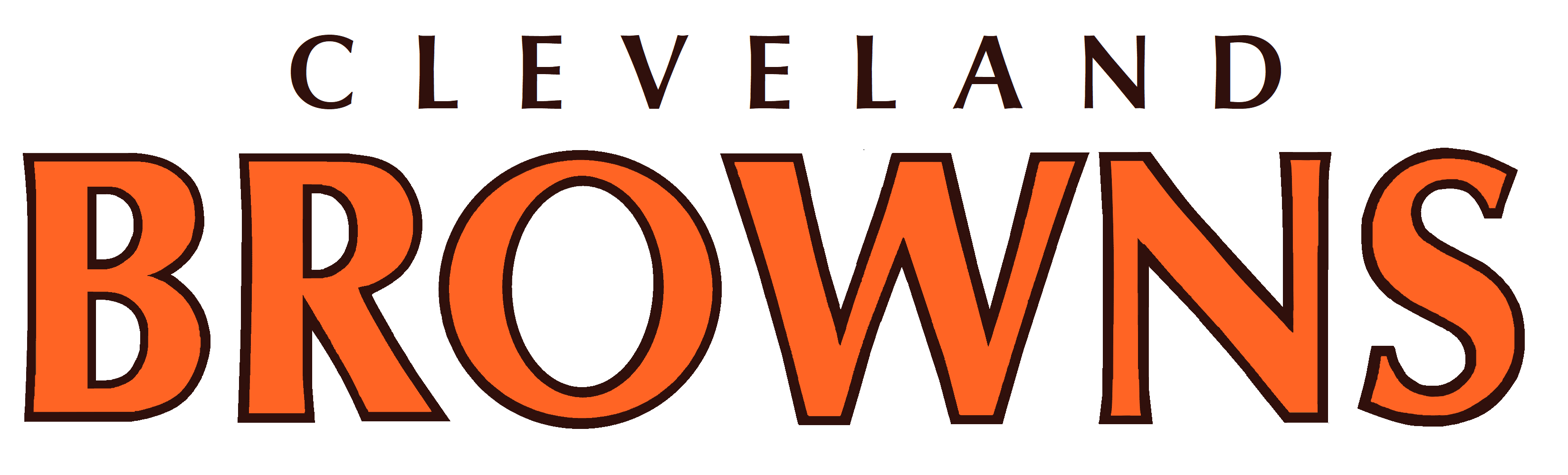
The Browns' primary script wordmark logo 1999–2002. This was also the Browns' script logo from 1983 to 1995.

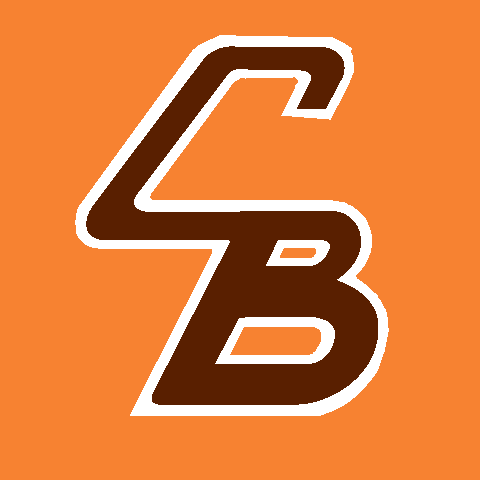
This logo idea was designed to be used on the helmets for the 1965 season. It never appeared in any games (preseason or regular season).

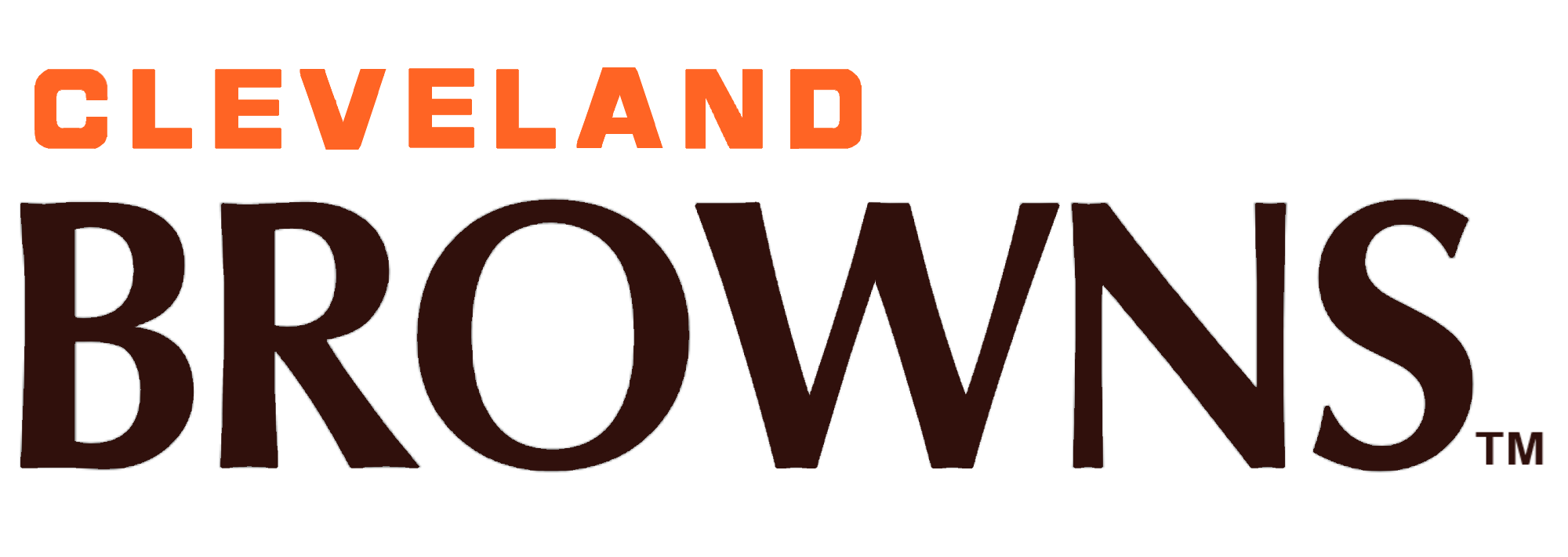
The Browns' primary script logo 1975–1995. This logo was modernized with the resumption of the franchise in 1999.

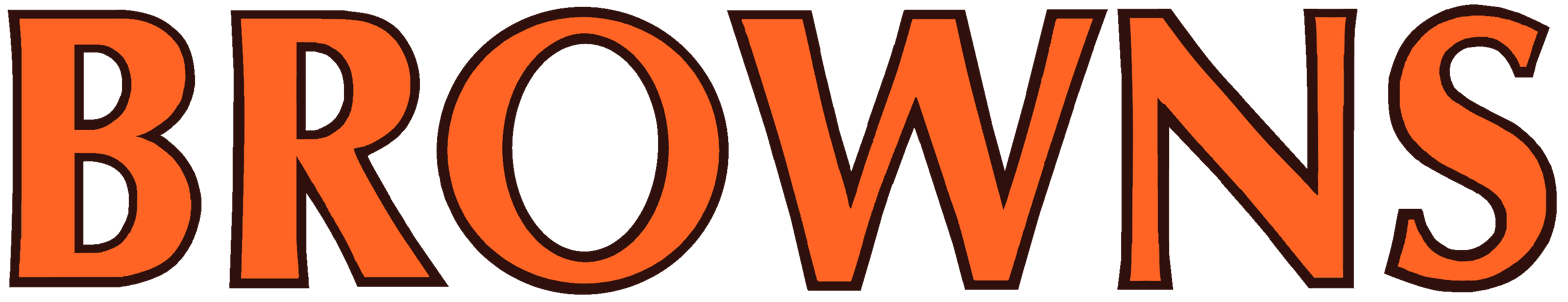
The Browns' script logo used from 1975 until the 2002 season.

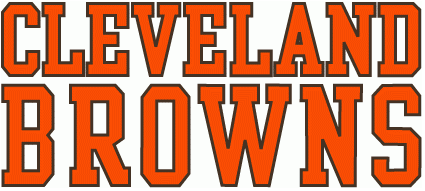
The Browns' script logo used from 2006 to 2014

The Browns' current script logo.

== Current design ==
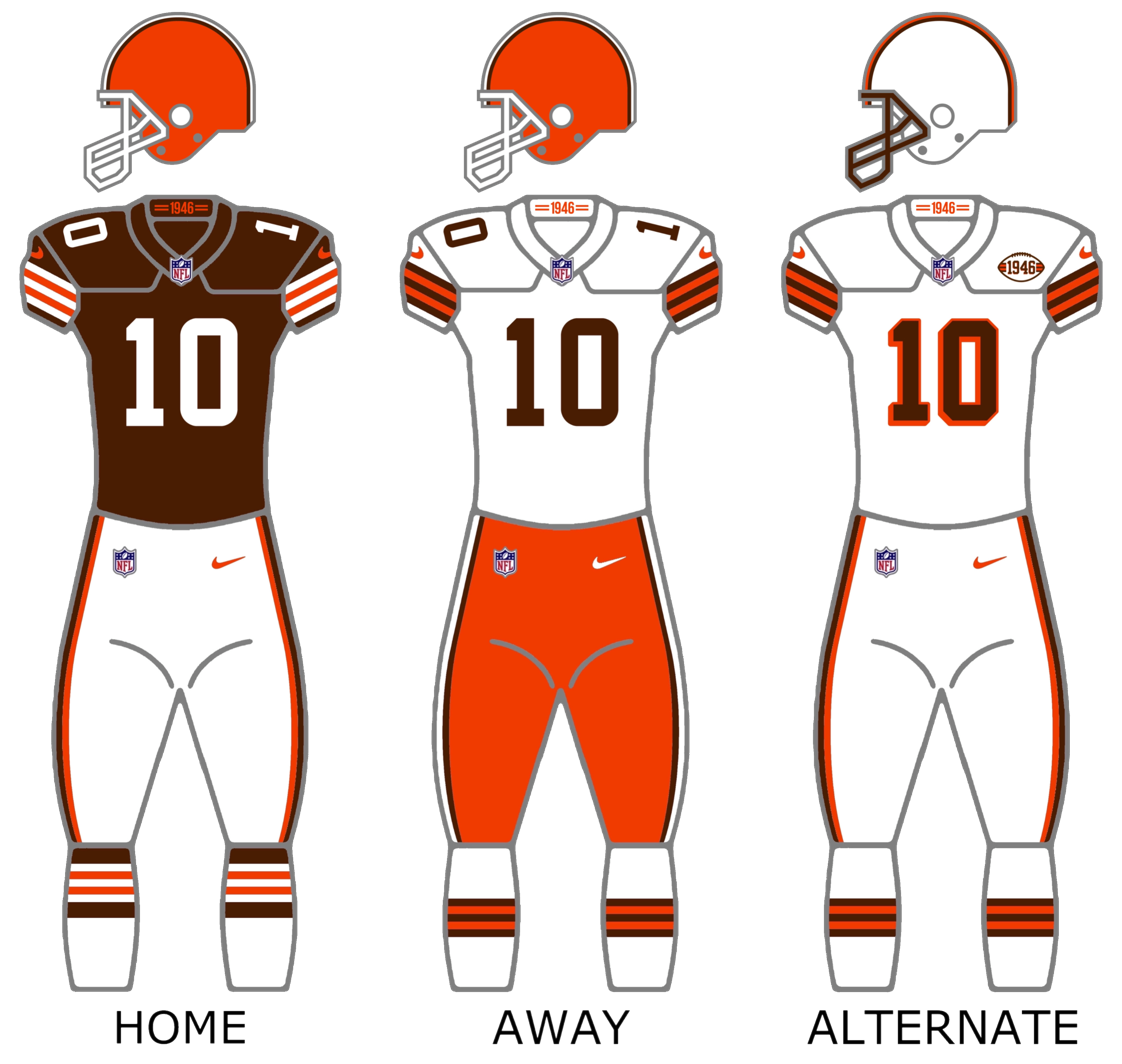
Cleveland Browns uniform combination

=== Jerseys ===
The Browns' home jersey is brown with three white and two orange stripes along the sleeves. Numbers and letters are in white. The road jersey is white with three brown and two orange stripes along the sleeves. Numbers and letters are in brown. The Browns wear two alternate jerseys: a throwback white jersey and an all-brown jersey. The throwback jersey is similar to their primary white jersey but features orange drop shadows on the numbers and thinner orange stripes. The alternate brown jersey features orange numbers and lacks striping.

=== Pants ===
The Browns currently wear five different pant designs. The white pants contain two orange stripes surrounding one brown stripe on each side; a variation with thinner orange stripes is used with their throwback white jersey. The orange pants contain two brown stripes surrounding one white stripe on each side. The primary brown pants feature the same stripes scheme as the white pants. The orange, white and primary brown pants are used with both the home brown and road white jerseys. The alternate brown pants lack any stripes and are normally paired with the alternate brown jerseys.

=== Socks ===
The Browns currently wear three different sock designs. The primary brown socks contain three white and two orange stripes. The white socks contain three brown and two orange stripes; a variation with thinner orange stripes is used with the throwback white jersey. The alternate brown socks, used with the alternate brown jerseys, lack any stripes.

==== Ill-fated 'CB' logo helmet logo design ====
In 1965, NFL Creative Services designed a brown "CB" logo for the Browns' helmet. It was never used in any games.

== Jersey changes made through the years ==
- 1946 – The Browns debuted the first version of what is now the team's standard look. The original jerseys contained drop shadows within the numbers, while the brown tops originally featured orange numbers before switching to all-white numbers after only a few games. Leather helmets were white.
- 1947 – The Browns tweaked their white jerseys, dropping the drop shadows along the numbers. The stripes on the brown socks were inverted to three orange and two white stripes.
- 1950 – The Browns started wearing orange leather helmets, but switched back to white helmets after only four weeks. They wore orange helmets for the 1951 preseason but returned to wearing white helmets for the remainder of the season. They would switch to hard plastic orange helmets with a single white stripe full-time in 1952. The original striping pattern returned on the brown socks.
- 1953 – The Browns introduced its first orange jersey in 1953. The jerseys and socks contained three brown and two white stripes, along with white numbers with brown trim. The uniform, which later featured all-brown numbers, was used during the 1953 season and the 1954 and 1955 preseason.
- 1957 – The Browns added brown numbers to the helmets. They would keep the number-less helmets in the preseason from 1957 to 1959. In 1960, the helmets received two brown stripes within the white stripe, but the numbers disappeared prior to the 1961 season.
- 1968 – The Browns added thin brown stripes within the thick orange stripes to the sleeves of the brown jersey. The following year, the white jerseys added thin white stripes on the same location.
- 1970 – The Browns complied to the stipulations of the AFL–NFL merger by adding names to the back of the uniform. The sock stripes were also updated to match the sleeves.
- 1975 – The Browns wore orange pants for the first time, and would wear them full-time until 1983. The facemask color also changed to white. In 1977, the pant stripes were thickened.
- 1984 – The Browns jerseys underwent its first radical redesign. Orange pants were replaced by white pants with a thick orange stripe outlined by two thick brown stripes. Sock stripes were also eliminated. Sleeve stripes were also reduced; the white tops contained a thick brown stripe outlined by two orange stripes, while the brown tops contained a thick orange stripe outlined by thin brown and white stripes. Initially, the brown tops featured orange numbers with brown and white trim, but were reverted to plain white numbers due to legibility concerns.
- 1985 – The Browns reverted to the classic look. While the brown jerseys kept the same design it wore two seasons prior, the white jerseys returned to the pre-1969 style with thicker stripes.
- 1992 – With the NFL reducing the length of the sleeves, the Browns altered the striping configurations of their jerseys. The brown jersey featured one orange and one white stripe, while the white jersey featured one brown and one orange stripe.
- 1999 – The Browns returned to the NFL wearing the pre-1992 uniform style. This time, the sleeve stripes were moved from the bottom to the middle of the sleeves, necessitating the move of the "TV numbers" to the shoulders.
- 2002 – The Browns unveiled orange alternate jerseys, featuring white numbers with brown drop shadows, three brown and two white sleeve stripes, and solid brown socks.
- 2003 – The Browns tweaked the classic look by adding the team name on the chest. Orange pants also returned, while the classic striped brown socks were retired. A second set of white pants were also used, featuring thin white stripes outlining the thick orange stripe. These pants are paired with the regular brown jerseys. The Al Lerner memorial patch was added to the right sleeve in the same manner as the George Halas patch on the Chicago Bears' jerseys. The Lerner patch remained until 2014.
- 2005 – The Browns retired the orange jerseys permanently, while also taking the orange pants off the uniform rotation. The modified white pants were also retired, but kept the solid brown socks.
- 2006 – The Browns wore throwback uniforms based on the team's 1957–1959 look. The regular brown uniforms also brought back the pre-1968 stripes scheme on the sleeves. The facemask color reverted to grey.
- 2008 – The Browns wore brown pants for the first time in team history on August 18, 2008, during a preseason game against the New York Giants. The pants contained no stripes or markings. The team had the brown pants created as an option for their away uniform in 2006 and appeared as the away default uniform choice in Madden NFL 09 (2008 season). The brown pants became a regular uniform option in 2009. This was a favorite uniform of Eric Mangini.
- 2013 – On October 3, 2013, the Browns paired the brown pants with brown tops for the first time in a Thursday Night Football game against the Buffalo Bills.
- 2015 – The Browns drastically redesigned their jerseys, featuring updated sleeve and pant stripes, modernized font and increased use of orange. Changes include the addition of the team name below the stripes on each side of the pants, the addition of the city name on the chest above the uniform numbers, and orange numbers on the brown and white tops. Facemask color was also changed to brown. In all, the Browns released three different sets of uniforms and nine different combinations: brown, orange and white tops, brown, orange and white pants, and brown and orange socks. The striping scheme were as follows: orange-white-orange on the brown jerseys and pants, brown-orange-brown on the white jerseys and pants, and white-brown-white on the orange jerseys and pants. The team later added all-white hosiery to the set.
- 2018 – The Browns unveiled an all-brown Color Rush jersey in 2016, but did not wear them until the 2018 season. The set is essentially a return to the classic Browns look minus the white elements, featuring orange stripes and letters. In 2019, it became the primary home jersey, and during Week 3 against the Rams, they outfitted the look with orange socks.
- 2020 – The Browns reverted to the classic look full-time, but kept the modernized letters and numbers of the previous rebrand. The brown pants with orange stripes from the original Color Rush uniform was retained. Striped brown socks were also brought back for the first time since 2002. The Color Rush jersey was updated without any stripes.
- 2021 – The Browns unveiled a throwback jersey in commemoration of the franchise's 75th anniversary. The jerseys were modeled after the 1946 design, but the helmets used were the standard orange with grey facemasks (a nod to the 1960s-early 1970s helmets), brown numbers (a nod to the late 1950s helmets), and a single white stripe (a nod to the 1950s helmets).
- 2023 – A corresponding white alternate helmet was unveiled to be worn with the throwback white jersey they last wore in 2021 to commemorate their 75th anniversary. The design mirrored that of their primary orange helmets, with a middle orange stripe between two brown stripes instead of white.
- 2024 – The Browns switched from brown facemasks to white facemasks for the 2024 season.
- 2025 – All-brown Color Rush uniforms return after a two-season absence, and were now paired with an alternate brown helmet. This helmet featured a matte brown finish with two orange stripes flanking a brown middle stripe. After the NFL allowed teams to wear their alternate helmets with the primary uniforms and vice versa, the Browns paired the alternate white helmets with the primary white uniforms and orange pants during a Week 12 game against the Las Vegas Raiders. They did not wear the throwback white uniforms this season.
- 2026 – The Browns wore their stripeless brown Color Rush uniform with the primary white road uniform on Week 7 against the Tennessee Titans. It marked the first time they wore the stripeless brown pants with their primary uniform since 2014, and the first time they wore this combination since the 2020 redesign.
