= Baltimore Browns =

No sports team has ever existed bearing the name Baltimore Browns. However, two sports franchises were named the Browns prior to their respective owners' assuming new team names in Baltimore:

- In baseball, the Baltimore Orioles moved from St. Louis, where they were known as the St. Louis Browns.
- The Cleveland Browns relocation controversy arose when the owner of the NFL's Cleveland Browns was given a new franchise when he relocated that team's personnel to Baltimore. That team now plays as the Baltimore Ravens.
