= Wolkoff =

Wolkoff (Russian: Во́лков) is a Russian and Ashkenazi Jewish surname. It is a westernized version of the surname Volkov. Notable people with this surname include:

- Alexander Wolkoff (1844–1928, signed as A. N. Roussoff), Russian botanist and painter; see Palazzo Barbaro Wolkoff.
- Anna Wolkoff (1902–1973), Russian-born Britain's administrator
- Norma Lerner (born 1935/36 as Norma Wolkoff), American billionaire
- Stephanie Winston Wolkoff, American fashion and entertainment executive, senior advisor to Melania Trump
