= Alfred Lerner =

Alfred Lerner may refer to:

- Al Lerner (1933–2002), American businessman
- Alfred D. Lerner (1928–2009), American politician
