= Cleveland Browns relocation controversy =

NFL franchise move

- "The Move"; Part of the 1995 NFL season
- Location of the home fields for the Cleveland Browns and the Baltimore Ravens
- Date: December 11, 1994 – February 9, 1996
- Location: Cleveland, Ohio and Baltimore, Maryland (United States)
- Caused by: Financial constraints within Cleveland Browns ownership including team value and revenue losses; Dispute over plans to renovate or replace Cleveland Stadium
- Result: Cleveland Browns franchise suspended after the 1995 NFL season: Assets and player contracts transferred to the Baltimore Ravens expansion franchise, which would begin play in 1996; Cleveland Browns franchise resumes operations in 1999; Baltimore Stallions of the Canadian Football League forced to cease operations after the 1995 CFL season, with all of their assets transferred to the Montreal Alouettes

Parties
Cleveland Browns franchise	National Football League (NFL)	City of Cleveland

Lead figures
Art Modell (majority owner); Al Lerner (minority owner)	Paul Tagliabue (commissioner)	Michael White (mayor)

The Cleveland Browns relocation controversy—colloquially called "The Move" by fans—followed the announcement by Cleveland Browns owner Art Modell that his National Football League (NFL) team would move from its longtime home of Cleveland to Baltimore for the 1996 NFL season.

Subsequent legal actions by the City of Cleveland and Browns season ticket holders led the NFL to broker a compromise in which Modell agreed to return the Browns franchise to the league. The agreement stipulated that the Browns franchise, including its history, records and intellectual property, would remain in Cleveland. In exchange, the NFL agreed to grant Modell a new franchise in Baltimore (which was eventually named the Ravens) and the City of Cleveland agreed to build an NFL-caliber venue to replace the aging Cleveland Stadium.

Since it was deemed unfeasible for the Browns to play the 1996 season in Cleveland under such circumstances, the franchise was officially deactivated by the NFL in February 1996. The NFL agreed to re-activate the Browns by 1999 either by way of an expansion draft or by moving an existing team to Cleveland. In lieu of holding both a dispersal draft for the Browns and an expansion draft for the Ravens, the NFL allowed Modell to effectively transfer the Browns' existing football organization to the Ravens. As such, the Ravens are officially regarded by the NFL as an expansion team that began play in 1996. By 1998, the NFL had ruled out moving any of the league's then-30 teams to Cleveland, committed to stocking the roster with an expansion draft, and sold the Browns franchise to Al Lerner, a former minority owner of the franchise under Modell, for $530 million. The re-activated Browns acquired players through this expansion draft and, in 1999, resumed play in a new stadium that replaced the demolished one.

This compromise, which was considered unprecedented at the time in North American professional sports, has since been cited in franchise moves and agreements in other leagues, including ones in Major League Baseball (MLB), Major League Soccer (MLS), the National Basketball Association (NBA), and the National Hockey League (NHL). While there have been other subsequent franchise moves with various franchise agreements, there have been two times when there was a compromise virtually identical to the Browns–Ravens agreement: when the San Jose Earthquakes of MLS suspended operations from 2006 and 2007 while their organization transferred to the new Houston Dynamo, and when the Arizona Coyotes of the NHL suspended operations in 2024 while their organization transferred to the new Utah Mammoth.

== Dissatisfaction with Cleveland Stadium ==
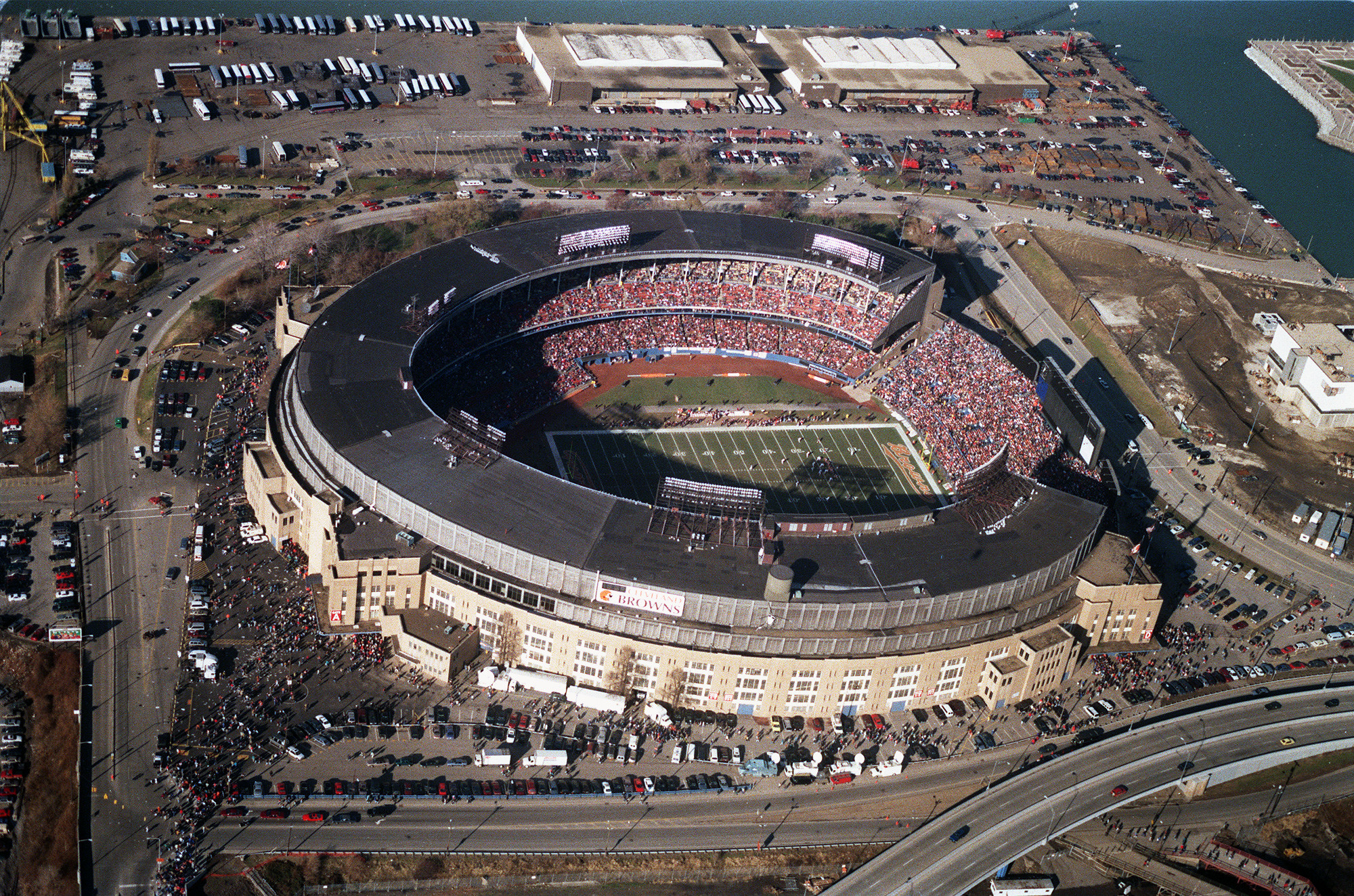
Cleveland Stadium, where the Browns played until 1995.

In 1975, knowing that Municipal Stadium was costing the city more than $300,000 a year to operate, then-Browns owner Art Modell signed a 25-year lease in which he agreed to incur these expenses in exchange for quasi-ownership of the stadium, a portion of his annual profits, and capital improvements to the stadium at his expense. Modell's new company, Stadium Corporation, paid the city annual rents of $150,000 for the first five years and $200,000 afterwards.

Modell had originally promised never to move the Browns. He had publicly criticized the Baltimore Colts' move to Indianapolis, and had testified in favor of the NFL in court cases where the league unsuccessfully tried to stop Al Davis from moving the Oakland Raiders to Los Angeles. However, Modell refused to share suite revenue with the Cleveland Indians, who also played at Cleveland Stadium at that time, even though some of the revenues were generated during baseball games.

In 1990, voters approved a ballot measure to build a new sports complex, the Gateway Sports and Entertainment Complex, which included a new baseball-only stadium and an arena. Modell, believing that his revenues were not endangered, decided not to participate in the Gateway Project that built Jacobs Field for the Indians and Gund Arena for the Cleveland Cavaliers. Modell's assumptions proved incorrect, and Stadium Corporation's suite revenues declined sharply when the Indians moved to Jacobs Field in 1994. Soaring player salaries put additional financial pressure on the Browns' owner. Modell claimed to have lost $21 million between 1993 and 1994.

== Financial considerations ==
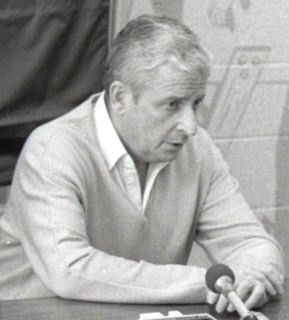
Art Modell in 1980

Due to the massive and relatively consistent increase in the value of NFL franchises since the league's founding in 1920, the league has a long history of owners whose net worth is largely accounted for by the value of their football teams. Even today, many of the league's clubs are owned by businesspeople (or their heirs) who, while relatively well-off by the standards of the time, founded or purchased a football team which has since appreciated in value at a far higher rate than whatever other business interests they might have originally been involved in. However, even with those considerations in mind, Modell's net worth had always been relatively meager compared to most other principal owners in the NFL, despite his long influence in league circles.

The Browns' capitalization problems dated to their founding as a charter All-America Football Conference (AAFC) franchise by legendary coach Paul Brown. Modell was recruited in large part because the NFL was desperate to avoid any perception of franchise instability within its ranks, especially in the face of competition with the then-fledgling (but well-financed) American Football League (AFL). As Cleveland had been decisive in ensuring the AAFC's relative success and eventual partial merger with the older league, the NFL was keen not to lose the market to a rival league – as it had in 1946 when it allowed the Cleveland Rams to move to Los Angeles. Modell's purchase of the team was thus approved by the NFL under conditions that the league might otherwise have rejected. It was among the most heavily leveraged purchases in league history: most of the funds used to purchase the team were borrowed.

On the one hand, the eventual negotiation of a merger with the AFL ended the prospect of expensive bidding wars for players in an era when true free agency did not exist, thus allowing the Browns to remain competitive on the field despite a tight budget. Nevertheless, Modell spent most of his tenure as Browns owner in financial difficulty, especially as interest rates soared and the costs of operating an NFL team escalated with the value of the league's franchises. As the 1960's came to a close, the Browns appeared in the NFL's final pre-merger championship game, yet Modell's finances were so perilous that they were a major factor in his decision to lobby for the Browns (along with the Pittsburgh Steelers and Baltimore Colts) to be moved to the American Football Conference upon completion of the merger in 1970 in exchange for financial compensation from the other NFL and AFL owners. However, the $3 million payout (equal to approximately $25 million today) ultimately proved woefully insufficient to clear the team's growing debts.

The Browns' financial situation led Modell to take legally questionable measures to remain solvent. For example, he tried to transfer liability for several personal bad loans to the Browns organization, prompting one of his minority partners to sue him. As early as 1983, Modell concluded that he would never be able to pay all of his debts before his deal with the city expired. The loss of revenue from the Indians hit Modell especially hard. After realizing how much revenue was lost from the Indians moving out of Cleveland Stadium, he requested a referendum be placed on the ballot to provide $175 million in taxes to refurbish the outmoded and declining Cleveland Stadium.

Baltimore had previously attempted to woo the Cincinnati Bengals and owner Mike Brown into moving his team earlier in the decade, with Brown even visiting with a group in the city in his own attempts to get a new venue for his team.

== Announcing the move ==
On December 12, 1994, Modell told his board that he did not believe a referendum to raise the sin tax would pass, as the proceeds would have been used to either fund a renovated Municipal Stadium or a new stadium. Modell then informed them that if the referendum failed, he would be finished in Cleveland, and would have no choice but to move the Browns.

Entering the 1995 season, the Browns, coached by Bill Belichick, were coming off a playoff season in 1994 in which the team finished 11–5 and advanced to the second round of the playoffs. Sports Illustrated predicted that the Browns would represent the AFC in Super Bowl XXX at the end of the 1995 season, and the team started 3–1, but they then lost their next three games.

While this was happening, Browns minority owner Al Lerner was privately prodding Modell to consider moving to Baltimore. He urged Modell to contact John Moag, the newly installed Maryland Stadium Authority chairman. Earlier in the year, the league had told Moag that Baltimore would get a team (either an expansion team or an existing team that would be moved from another city) if a stadium were already in place.

Elected officials in Baltimore and Maryland were still smarting from the Colts moving to Indianapolis after the 1983 season, and refused to commit any money towards a new stadium unless the Stadium Authority secured a deal with a team. With this in mind, Moag made several calls to Modell that went ignored for much of 1995. Finally, in late July, Modell allowed Lerner to meet with Moag, provided that Lerner stress that Modell was not serious about moving. At that meeting, Moag laid out an offer in which the Browns would get the rights to a new, $220 million stadium if they moved to Baltimore. However, Moag told Lerner to take the offer back to Modell only if he was serious about considering a move.

Negotiations continued in secret until September, when Moag told Lerner that if the Browns were serious about moving, "you need to act and act now." A few days later, Lerner, Modell and Moag met at Lerner's Midtown Manhattan office. At that meeting, Moag presented a memorandum of understanding that was almost identical to what he'd offered the Cincinnati Bengals a few months earlier: a deal that ultimately led Cincinnati voters to pass a referendum that built what would become Paul Brown Stadium. Indeed, some paragraphs still referred to "Cincinnati" rather than "Cleveland." Modell still had some trepidation about the deal, but signed after Moag assured him that Baltimore fans would hail him as a hero.

Soon afterward, Modell told San Francisco 49ers president Carmen Policy that he was moving the Browns to Baltimore. Policy had been well aware that relations between Modell and Cleveland had become rather strained, and was secretly working with Pittsburgh Steelers owner Dan Rooney to keep the Browns in Cleveland. Policy urged Modell to sit down with NFL Commissioner Paul Tagliabue in hopes of resolving the situation, but Modell rejected it out of hand.

On November 6, 1995, with the team at 4–5, Modell announced in a press conference at Camden Yards that he had signed a deal to move the Browns to Baltimore for the 1996 season. The team would play at the Colts' former home (Memorial Stadium) while the new stadium was being built. Modell said he felt the city of Cleveland did not have the funding nor political will to build a first-class stadium. The very next day, on November 7, Cleveland voters overwhelmingly approved the aforementioned tax issue to remodel Cleveland Stadium.

Despite this, Modell ruled out a reversal of his decision, maintaining publicly that his relationship with Cleveland had been irrevocably severed. "The bridge is down, burned, disappeared", he said. "There's not even a canoe there for me." In truth, Modell had been brought to tears when he signed the memorandum of understanding in September: he had even told Moag that signing it was "the hardest thing I've ever done" and meant "the end of our life in Cleveland." Years later, longtime Browns general counsel Jim Bailey told The Athletic that Modell was "an emotional wreck" when he signed the memorandum.

== Initial reaction ==
The City of Cleveland sued Modell, the Browns, Stadium Corp, the Maryland Stadium Authority, and the authority's director, John A. Moag Jr., in City of Cleveland v. Cleveland Browns, et al., Cuyahoga County Court of Common Pleas Case No. CV-95-297833, for breaching the Browns' lease, which required the team to play its home games at Cleveland Stadium for several years beyond 1995, filing an injunction to keep the Browns in the city until at least 1998. Several other lawsuits were filed by fans and ticket holders. The United States Congress even held hearings on the matter.

Comedian Drew Carey returned to his hometown of Cleveland on November 26, 1995, to host "Fan Jam" in protest of the proposed move. A protest was held in Pittsburgh during the Browns' game there against the Pittsburgh Steelers, but ABC, the network broadcasting the game (and also the home of his brand-new sitcom), declined to cover or mention the protest. That game was one of the few instances that Steelers fans and Browns fans were supportive of each other, as fans in Pittsburgh felt that Modell was robbing their team of their long-standing rivalry with the Browns. Browns fans reacted with anger to the news, wearing hats and T-shirts that read "Muck Fodell".

On the field, the Browns stumbled to finish 5–11 after the announcement, ahead of only the expansion Jacksonville Jaguars, to whom they lost twice, in the AFC Central, becoming the first team in the NFL's modern era to lose twice to a first-year expansion team. Virtually all of the team's sponsors pulled their support, leaving Cleveland Stadium devoid of advertising during the team's final weeks. After the announcement, the team lost all their home games except the final, in which they defeated the Cincinnati Bengals 26–10. The game itself was blacked out on television locally on WKYC, but NBC did broadcast extensive pregame coverage from Cleveland. During the broadcast, host Bob Costas noted the "final sad irony" of Brooklyn native Modell moving a beloved franchise much as Walter O'Malley had moved the Dodgers to Los Angeles.

== Settlement ==
After extensive talks, the NFL, Modell, and officials of the two cities came to terms – among them, Modell agreed to keep the Browns legacy in Cleveland if the city dropped its lawsuit. While a number of parties had already expressed interest in acquiring the Browns, it soon became clear that no viable owner would be ready to operate a football team on such short notice; moreover, the NFL had insisted on the replacement of Cleveland Stadium, whereas the city had no other venue that met NFL requirements for even temporary use. Thus, on February 9, 1996, the NFL announced that the Browns franchise would be "deactivated" for no more than three years, and that a new stadium would be built for a revived Browns team, as either an expansion team or a team moved from another city, that would begin play by 1999, while in exchange Modell would be granted a new franchise – the 31st NFL franchise – for Baltimore.

Modell was permitted to retain the current contracts of players and other football personnel. He replaced head coach Belichick with Ted Marchibroda, whose previous head coaching stints had been with the Colts: in Baltimore in the 1970s and in Indianapolis just before he was hired by Modell's still-unnamed Baltimore team. Modell also changed the name of his holding company from Cleveland Browns, Inc. to Baltimore Ravens, Inc. Modell is typically reckoned to have moved the football organization, but not the franchise itself. The transaction was similar to the establishment of Baltimore's preceding NFL team, the 1953–83 Colts, whose owner Carroll Rosenbloom was awarded the player contracts and related football assets of the moribund Dallas Texans. The Texans were dissolved and their history is not claimed by the Colts, the Dallas Cowboys, or any other extant franchise.

The settlement stipulated that the reactivated team for Cleveland would retain the Browns' name, colors, history, records, awards, and archives. It was approved by league owners after a 25–2 vote, with three abstentions. The two "no" votes were from Ralph Wilson of Buffalo and Dan Rooney of Pittsburgh. The three abstentions were from the owners whose teams at the time had most recently moved (the Cardinals, Raiders and Rams), including Raiders' owner Al Davis who had publicly clashed with Modell over franchise moves.

An additional stipulation was that the Browns would be placed in a division with the Pittsburgh Steelers and Cincinnati Bengals to continue the teams' longstanding rivalries. Upon their reactivation in 1999, the Browns were placed in the AFC Central with the Steelers and Bengals, as well as the Ravens, Titans, and Jaguars. The rearrangement put teams from Baltimore, Cleveland, and Pittsburgh in the same NFL division for the first time. When the NFL reorganized into divisions of four teams for the 2002 season, Cleveland, Pittsburgh, Cincinnati, and Baltimore remained together in the new AFC North, while Tennessee, Jacksonville, Indianapolis (from the AFC East), and the expansion Houston Texans were placed in the new AFC South.

The only other active NFL team to temporarily suspend operations without merging with another was Cleveland's previous NFL team, the Rams, which did not field a team for the 1943 season due to a shortage of players at the height of World War II.

== Aftermath and legacy ==
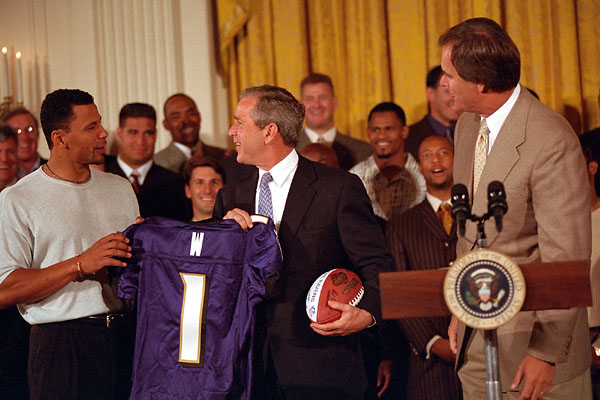
The Super Bowl-winning Baltimore Ravens in the White House on June 8, 2001. The Ravens won Super Bowl XXXV just five seasons after the move.

The return of the NFL to Baltimore compelled the departure of the city's existing professional football team: the Grey Cup champion Baltimore Stallions of the Canadian Football League (CFL). Although they had drawn respectable fan support during their two seasons in Baltimore, Stallions owner Jim Speros knew his team could not compete with an NFL team, and in any case would have likely been evicted from Memorial Stadium to make way for the Ravens. Speros opted to re-establish the Montreal Alouettes, a move that effectively ended the CFL's U.S. expansion experiment. The team assumed the name and history of the team that previously played in the city, the Alouettes, which had ceased operations just days before the start of the 1987 season.

Focus groups, a telephone survey, and a fan contest were held to help pick a new name for Modell's team. Team officials reduced an initial list of more than 100 names to 17. Focus groups of a total of 200 Baltimore area residents reduced the list to six, and then a phone survey of 1,000 people trimmed it to three: Marauders, Americans, and Ravens. Finally, a fan contest drawing 33,288 voters picked "Ravens", alluding to the poem "The Raven" by Edgar Allan Poe, who spent the latter part of his life in Baltimore and is buried there. The team adopted purple and black as their team colors, a stark contrast to the Browns' brown and orange. The former Colts Marching Band, which remained in Baltimore after the Colts moved to Indianapolis, was renamed the Baltimore's Marching Ravens. The Washington Commanders are the only other NFL team with an official marching band.

Modell's move to Baltimore came amid an unprecedented flurry of similar threats – and actual moves – that fueled 12 new stadiums throughout the NFL. The Seahawks, Buccaneers, Bengals, Lions, Cardinals, and Bears used the threat of moving to coerce their respective cities to build new stadiums with public funds. Modell's team was one of four that actually moved between 1995 and 1997: Los Angeles lost both of its teams for the 1995 season, as the Raiders moved back to Oakland and the Rams moved east to St. Louis (the Rams would later move back to Los Angeles in 2016); and the Houston Oilers moved to Tennessee in 1997, where they became the Tennessee Titans two years later.

As with all other moves, NFL football continued to air on local television in Cleveland due to the league's television contracts. During the three years the Browns suspended operations, the NFL ordered its broadcast partners to air games featuring the Browns' two biggest rivals, the Bengals and Steelers, on Cleveland's local stations. Two official secondary markets the Browns share with another team – Columbus and Youngstown – both primarily aired games from the teams the Browns shared those markets with, with Columbus airing Bengals games and Youngstown airing Steelers games. Erie, Pennsylvania, which is officially a secondary market for the Buffalo Bills but airs many Browns games due to Erie's close proximity to Cleveland, aired more Bills home games as well as Steelers games whenever it didn't come in conflict with the Bills away schedule. Toledo, a secondary market the Browns share with the Detroit Lions, carried AFC games involving Michigan Wolverines alumni, as Ann Arbor as well as Detroit are within 75 miles of Toledo, and occasionally Indianapolis Colts games.

After several NFL teams threatened to move to Cleveland to become the reactivated Browns (most notably the Tampa Bay Buccaneers), the NFL decided in 1998 to make the reactivated Browns an expansion team; while temporarily giving the league an odd number of teams (causing at least one team to be off in each of the 17 weeks of the NFL season from 1999–2001), this also eliminated any possibility of an existing franchise giving up its own identity for the Browns and thus prevented more lawsuits. In an ironic twist, Al Lerner – who helped Modell move to Baltimore – was granted ownership of the reactivated Browns; he did this by paying $530 million, a record for a sports franchise at the time, outdistancing the next closest bid by $30 million. As Lerner couldn't be co-owner of two teams at the same time, Modell had to pay $32 million to buy out Lerner's stake in the Baltimore Ravens.. After Lerner's death in 2002, his son Randy took over ownership of the Browns before selling the team to Pilot Flying J CEO Jimmy Haslam in 2012.

From its beginning, the odd number of teams and the ensuing awkward scheduling was considered a temporary arrangement pending the addition of a 32nd NFL franchise. Although Los Angeles was heavily favored, it was ultimately Houston that was awarded the league's 32nd team for the 2002 NFL season. The 2002 expansion led to a major re-alignment of the NFL into eight four-team divisions. The Jaguars and Titans joined the Texans in the new AFC South along with the Colts, Baltimore's former team, who moved from the AFC East. The Browns and Ravens' division was rebranded as the AFC North. Finally, to keep the conferences equal in size, the Seattle Seahawks (who had played their inaugural season in the National Football Conference) moved from the AFC West to the NFC West.

After Houston returned to the NFL, Los Angeles became the favored destination for owners threatening to move their teams until the St. Louis Rams finally returned to Los Angeles for the 2016 season, followed the next year by the San Diego Chargers (who had called L.A. home in the early days of the American Football League).

Two of the players from the Browns' 1995 roster returned to Cleveland in 1999: Antonio Langham, who spent the 1998 season with the San Francisco 49ers and was claimed by the Browns in the expansion draft, and Orlando Brown, who played for Baltimore until 1998 and signed with Cleveland as a free agent. Each would play only the 1999 season in Cleveland, and would be the only two players to play for the Browns under both the Modell and Lerner organizations.

The reactivated Browns have had only four winning seasons since returning to the NFL in 1999: 9–7 in 2002, 10–6 in 2007, 11–5 in 2020, and 11–6 in 2023, earning wild card berths in the playoffs in 2002, 2020, and 2023. The Ravens have been more successful, reaching the playoffs 15 times since 2000 and winning Super Bowl XXXV and Super Bowl XLVII, to the dismay of Browns fans. Longtime placekicker Matt Stover was the last remaining Ravens player that played for the Modell-owned Browns; the Ravens chose not to re-sign him after the 2008 season, and he finished his career with the Indianapolis Colts. General manager and former Browns tight end Ozzie Newsome (who was in a front-office role under Modell in Cleveland) remained with the Ravens until he retired in 2018.

In Pittsburgh, Steelers owner Dan Rooney had opposed Modell's move to Baltimore, citing respect for the team and its fans. (Rooney and Ralph Wilson of the Bills were the only two such owners.) The new Browns' lack of success cooled the once-heated Browns–Steelers rivalry, at least in Pittsburgh, where some fans consider the Ravens–Steelers rivalry its spiritual successor; Browns fans still consider it their top rivalry, and even Pittsburgh fans took note when the Browns defeated the Steelers 48–37 in the 2020 Wild Card playoff round.

Modell continued to struggle financially after the move. Like several other owners who had acquired their teams before the AFL–NFL merger, Modell's net worth was primarily derived from the appreciation of his team's value, and he had relatively little outside wealth to help underwrite his club's expenses. The NFL directed Modell to sell the team, and on March 27, 2000, NFL owners approved the sale of 49 percent of the Ravens to Steve Bisciotti. On April 8, 2004, owners approved Bisciotti's request to exercise his option to buy the remaining 51 percent for $325 million.

This did little to improve Modell's reputation among Browns fans, who still hated him for the move and for his 1963 firing of head coach Paul Brown, who went on to found the arch-rival Bengals in 1968. Some believe the move and its related lawsuits kept Modell out of the Pro Football Hall of Fame in Canton, Ohio, 60 miles south of Cleveland and part of the Cleveland television market and Browns' territorial rights. Modell died in 2012 having never returned to Cleveland. The following Sunday, the Browns were the only home team that did not acknowledge Modell's death: his stepson David Modell had feared that fans would react with anger.

== Effect on teams in other sports leagues ==
=== Major League Baseball ===
- The Minnesota Twins' 2006 deal with Hennepin County, Minnesota, to use Target Field includes a legal provision that allows the state of Minnesota the right of first refusal to buy the team if it is ever sold. Like Modell's deal with Cleveland, the deal also requires the team to leave behind the Twins name, colors, World Series trophies, and history if they ever move out of the state.
- After the Oakland Athletics announced their plans to move to Las Vegas in 2023, they sought to extend their lease at the Oakland Coliseum for three years while their new stadium in Las Vegas was being built. Oakland mayor Sheng Thao said the team could do so if the city could keep the Athletics name and history, a proposal the A's rejected. They played their last season in Oakland in 2024; temporarily moved to Sacramento, California, where they operate as the A's/Athletics; and are to permanently move to Las Vegas in 2028.

=== Major League Soccer ===
- The Browns move in 1995 had a direct effect on a proposed move of the Columbus Crew to Austin, Texas; the Modell Law, (Note: Ohio Rev. Code §9.67. "Restrictions on owner of professional sports team that uses a tax-supported facility".) which was implemented in Ohio in 1996, prohibits sports teams that benefited from public facilities or financial assistance from moving to another city without a six-month notice and an attempt to sell the team to a local ownership group. A lawsuit was filed by Ohio Attorney General Mike DeWine and the city of Columbus. Cleveland Browns owners Jimmy and Dee Haslam, along with other investors, offered to buy the Columbus Crew to keep them in Columbus. The deal sold the operational rights of the Crew to the Haslams, while previous Crew owner Anthony Precourt kept his equity stake in MLS, and was granted ownership of a new franchise in Austin. The sale of the Crew to Haslam's ownership group was announced on December 28, 2018, and was completed the following month. As part of the deal, the lawsuit against Precourt was dismissed that day; the Modell Law remains untested as a result. (Note: However, in 2025, the post 1999 Browns attempted to move to Brook Park, Ohio, and tested the Modell Law. The City of Cleveland and The Browns later settled.)
- In December 2005, the San Jose Earthquakes were granted permission to move to Houston under the condition that they leave behind the team name, colors, logo, and records (including two championship trophies), so it could be handed to an expansion team. The owners agreed and the team became the Houston Dynamo. In 2008, the Earthquakes returned under the ownership of Lew Wolff. As a result, the Earthquakes are regarded as having suspended operations in 2006 and 2007, while the Dynamo are recognized as a 2006 expansion team.

=== National Hockey League ===
- After the Quebec Nordiques moved to Denver in 1995 to become the Colorado Avalanche, the franchise's retired numbers, name, and logos remained in Quebec City and are expected to be used by any future Quebec City NHL franchise that may be established or move there. Upon arrival at Denver, the Nordiques' retired numbers were placed back into circulation.
- In 2011, a team took the name of a city's previous team (as the Baltimore Stallions did when the Ravens forced their move to Montreal). That saga began in 1996, when the Winnipeg Jets left Manitoba for Phoenix, Arizona, and become the Phoenix (later Arizona) Coyotes. Thirteen years later, the Coyotes went bankrupt and were taken over by the league. Winnipeg-based True North Sports & Entertainment offered to buy the team and return it to Winnipeg, where it presumably would have re-assumed the Jets' name and history. The NHL turned down that proposal – they were still looking for an owner to operate the franchise in Phoenix (which they did in 2013 when they found new ownership willing to keep it in Arizona), whose municipal government had agreed to subsidize the team's financial losses – but said that moving the team back to Winnipeg was their preferred backup option. However, when the Atlanta Thrashers came up for sale a year later, the league decided that – despite various local groups offering to purchase the franchise to keep it in Atlanta – there was no chance of finding an suitable owner to operate a franchise in Georgia. As a result, they arranged for True North to purchase the Atlanta franchise and move it to Winnipeg for the 2011–12 NHL season. The league decided to let True North and the new Jets use the identity of the old Winnipeg team, but, at the time, not its history, which remained in Arizona with the Coyotes. The new Jets organization highlighted this change by quickly re-issuing the team's #9 jersey – retired by the old Jets in honor of superstar Bobby Hull – to forward Evander Kane, who had worn the number in Atlanta. Forward Bryan Little, however, switched to #18 from his original #10 in respect to Dale Hawerchuk, often considered the greatest original Jet. At the time the Jets were unable to reclaim the franchise records of the original franchise from 1972 to 1996, though they honored the original incarnation by wearing throwback jerseys and paid tribute to its iconic players by establishing the Winnipeg Jets Hall of Fame. While the new Jets retain the history and records of the Thrashers, the Atlanta Spirit Group, the previous owners of the Thrashers, retained the rights of the name and logos for the Thrashers, which are expected to be used by any future Atlanta NHL franchise that may be established or move there. That is, until September 24, 2026, when the Jets history and records were consolidated.
- Under the deal that sold the Arizona Coyotes to Ryan Smith, the team's hockey operations, including personnel, draft picks, and roster, were moved to Salt Lake City after the 2023–24 season. The Coyotes franchise was marked "inactive" and the Utah Mammoth considered an expansion team. Coyotes owner Alex Meruelo remained part of the NHL Board of Governors and retained the rights to the Coyotes brand, history, and records (including, at the time, the history and records of the 1972–1996 Winnipeg Jets); had Meruelo built a new arena in the Phoenix area by 2029, he would have received an expansion franchise that would have acted as a "reactivated" Coyotes. In June 2024, Meruelo relinquished the rights of the Arizona Coyotes to the NHL after a planned land auction for a parcel that was intended for a new arena was canceled, causing the franchise to effectively cease operations. However, the NHL at the time had yet to decide whether to effectively fold the Coyotes franchise for good or to effectively transfer the history of the Coyotes to the Utah Mammoth (as well as transfer the original history of the Winnipeg Jets to the current Winnipeg Jets franchise and the Thrashers history of the current Winnipeg Jets to a potential new Atlanta team).
- In 2026, the situation regarding the statistical history of both the Jets and Coyotes were changed, when the NHL retroactively reassigned the statistical history of the first Jets team from the inactive Coyotes team to the modern day Jets team. As such, the Winnipeg Jets are now regarded as having been founded in the World Hockey Association (WHA) in 1972, joined the NHL in 1979, suspended operations in 1996, transferred all their assets to the Phoenix/Arizona Coyotes, before being reactivated and moved to Atlanta in 1999, to become the Atlanta Thrashers, before finally returning to Winnipeg in 2011 to become the Jets again. Meanwhile, the Coyotes are now seen as a 1996 expansion team that remains inactive as of 2026. Following the transfer the original history of the Winnipeg Jets to the current Winnipeg Jets franchise, the Jets have yet to re-retire the previous Winnipeg Jets retired numbers.

=== National Basketball Association ===
- The Seattle SuperSonics' 2008 move to Oklahoma City was approved under the condition that the team now known as the Oklahoma City Thunder leave behind the SuperSonics' name, logo, colors, and effects. The team's banners, trophies, and other artifacts are being kept at Seattle's Museum of History & Industry until a new team arrives to display them, while their history, records, championships, and retired numbers are shared with the Thunder until that time comes. In this case, OKC will return the latter artifacts back to the new Seattle team and relinquish their pre-move history to the new team.
- Similar to the Winnipeg Jets scenario in the NHL, the NBA first entered Charlotte in 1988 in the form of the Charlotte Hornets. That team moved to New Orleans after the 2001–02 season, retaining the Hornets name. Shortly after team moved to New Orleans, as part of the deal with the city of Charlotte, as well as to avoid a Cleveland Browns–like lawsuit, the NBA promised that Charlotte would get a new expansion franchise. The league returned to Charlotte for the 2004–05 season with a new team, the Charlotte Bobcats, and after the New Orleans franchise changed its name to the Pelicans following the 2012–13 season, the Bobcats announced that they would reclaim the Hornets name in the 2014–15 season. When the change became official in May 2014, the Hornets, Pelicans, and the NBA announced an agreement that the history and records of the original Charlotte Hornets would be transferred to the revived Hornets: thus, the Hornets are now considered to have been established in 1988, suspended operations in 2002, transferred all their assets to the New Orleans Hornets/Pelicans, before being reactivated and resuming play in 2004 as the Bobcats at the time before changing their name back to the Hornets in 2014. Meanwhile, the Pelicans are now considered a 2002 expansion team that was forced to move to Oklahoma City by Hurricane Katrina (and by extension, briefly rename themselves the New Orleans/Oklahoma City Hornets for a couple of seasons) before returning to New Orleans as the Hornets in 2007 and changing their name to the Pelicans in 2013. The new Hornets organization highlighted this change by retiring the team's #13 jersey – retired by the old Hornets in honor of Bobby Phills in February 2000 after his death in an automobile accident – in November 2014. The Bobcats previously did not issue number 13 out of respect to Phills, but after becoming the new Hornets, they opted to officially retire the jersey a second time and re-honor it. The jersey currently hangs in the Spectrum Center. The Pelicans have since returned the number 13 to circulation; the 2016–17 season saw Cheick Diallo become the first Pelicans player to wear the number after its reactivation.
- In the middle of the 2016–17 NBA season, the Detroit Pistons organized a deal to move the team out of The Palace of Auburn Hills and into the new Little Caesars Arena in Downtown Detroit, which was to open the following season: the deal was successful, and the Pistons moved into the arena the following season. When they moved back downtown, Palace Sports and Entertainment (the organization that owns the Pistons) made an agreement similar to the Supersonics' deal: if the team were ever to move out of Detroit, the team's name, colors, history, and records, including the team's NBA championship trophies, would remain in Detroit. This also includes all history, records, logo, colors, banners, and trophies of the Pistons' former WNBA affiliate, the Detroit Shock (now the Dallas Wings), whose three WNBA trophies and all other records were already in possession of the Pistons at the time of the move to Detroit.

=== National Lacrosse League ===
- The Rochester Knighthawks of the National Lacrosse League were moved to Halifax in the 2019 NLL season to become the Halifax Thunderbirds. The intellectual property of the Knighthawks was acquired by Terry Pegula in 2019 for the new team while the history and records were transferred to Halifax.

=== Women's National Basketball Association ===
- When the WNBA's Detroit Shock moved to Tulsa, Oklahoma, in 2010, the franchise left behind its three WNBA trophies, logo, colors, banners, trophies, and historical statistics for use by a future Detroit WNBA team. The Shock took their history and records to Tulsa and then to Arlington, Texas, in 2016, when they became the Dallas Wings, but will relinquish them in 2029, when Detroit is expected to regain a WNBA team.
- In March 2026, the Fertitta family, owners of the NBA's Houston Rockets, purchased the Connecticut Sun and relocated them to Houston, where they become the new version of the Houston Comets, taking their name from the team that played from 1997 to 2008. However, the history of the old Comets were not transferred to the new one, who retains the Sun’s team history and records.

== See also ==
- Relocation of professional sports teams
- Relocation of professional sports teams in the United States and Canada
- Cleveland sports curse
- Browns–Ravens rivalry
- History of the Cleveland Browns
- History of the Baltimore Ravens
