= Nancy Lerner =

American investor, philanthropist, and billionaire

Nancy Lerner Fisher
- Born: 1960 (age 65–66)
- Education: University of Cincinnati (BA); Cleveland State University (JD)
- Occupations: Investor, philanthropist
- Spouse(s): Michael Carosielli (divorced); William Beck (divorced); Elliott Fisher
- Children: 5
- Parent(s): Norma Wolkoff Lerner; Al Lerner
- Family: Randy Lerner (brother)

Nancy Lerner (born 1960) is an American investor, philanthropist, and billionaire.

== Biography ==
Lerner was born to a Jewish family, the daughter of Norma (née Wolkoff) and Al Lerner. She has one brother, Randy Lerner. She received a Bachelor of Arts from the University of Cincinnati and a Juris Doctor from the Cleveland State University College of Law at Cleveland State University. Her father was the CEO and chief executive of the MBNA Corporation, then the second largest issuer of credit cards in the world. When he died, his two children became billionaires. She established the Partnership for Families program which pays for in vitro fertilisation (IVF) for couples who are unable to afford the procedure.

== Personal life ==
Lerner has been married three times. Her first husband was Michael Carosielli whom she divorced in 1998. In 2005, she married Elliott Fisher. She has five children. In 2006, her six-year-old daughter, Emma, drowned. Lerner resides in Cleveland, Ohio.
