= Browns–Ravens rivalry =

National Football League rivalry

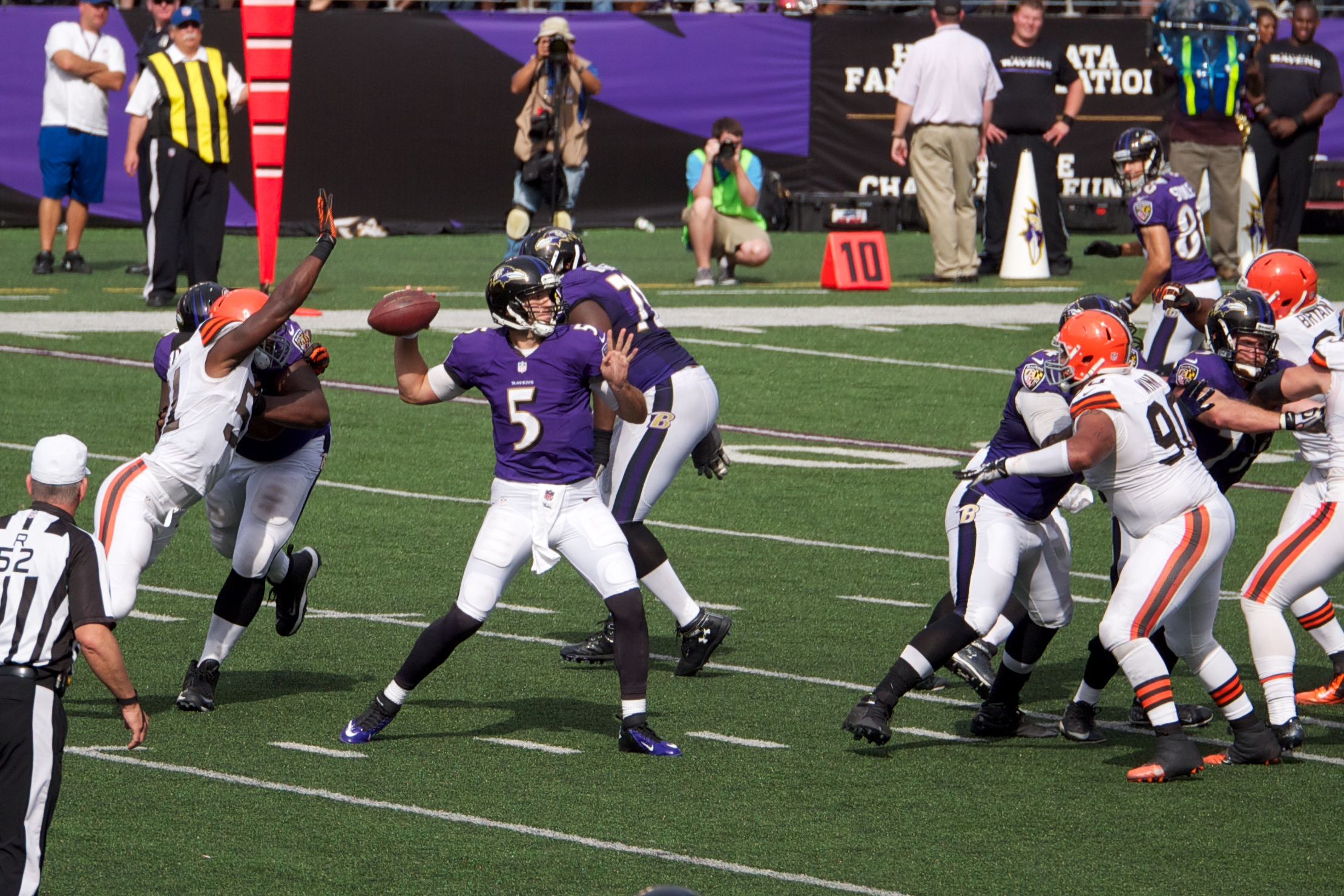
- Browns and Ravens face off during the 2013 season.

- Cleveland Browns Baltimore Ravens
- Location: Cleveland, Baltimore
- First meeting: September 26, 1999; Ravens 17, Browns 10
- Latest meeting: October 18, 2026; Browns 13, Ravens 10
- Next meeting: December 27, 2026
- Stadiums: Browns: Huntington Bank Field; Ravens: M&T Bank Stadium

Statistics
- Total meetings: 55
- All-time series: Ravens: 39–16
- Largest victory: Browns: 20–3 (2004); Ravens: 44–7 (2000)
- Most points scored: Browns: 42 (2020); Ravens: 47 (2020)
- Longest win streak: Browns: 2 (3 times); Ravens: 11 (2008–2013)
- Current win streak: Browns: 1 (2026–present)

The Browns–Ravens rivalry is a National Football League (NFL) rivalry between the Cleveland Browns and Baltimore Ravens.

Browns owner Art Modell expressed dissatisfaction with Cleveland Stadium and subsequently declared his intention to relocate the team to Baltimore, where they would be rebranded as the Baltimore Ravens. Following legal actions initiated by the City of Cleveland, the NFL reached a compromise, allowing for the establishment of a new Browns team in the 1999 season, retaining the franchise's historical legacy. Since then, the two teams in the AFC North have faced each other twice a year. The rivalry between the Browns and Ravens was more directed at former Browns owner Art Modell than the team itself. This matchup carries additional significance for Cleveland fans, as many players drafted between 1996 and 1998 contributed to the Ravens' Super Bowl XXXV victory. Had the Browns remained in Cleveland, these players, selected by general manager and former Browns tight end Ozzie Newsome, could have potentially led the Browns to a championship after a 36-year drought.

The Ravens lead the overall series, 39–16. The two teams have not met in the playoffs.

== History ==
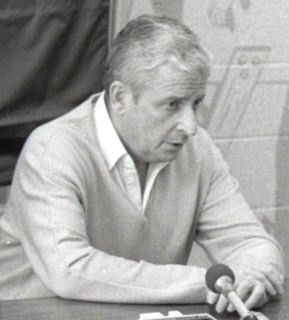
Art Modell, who owned the Browns since 1961, expressed dissatisfaction with Cleveland Stadium and subsequently declared his intention to relocate the team to Baltimore. After a legal battle with the City of Cleveland, a compromise was reached whereby Modell consented to return the Browns franchise to the league. In return, the NFL granted Modell a new franchise in Baltimore, which was later named the Baltimore Ravens.

=== 1995–1998: Modell moves his organization to Baltimore ===
On November 6, 1995, Cleveland Browns owner Art Modell announced in a press conference at Camden Yards, home of Major League Baseball's Baltimore Orioles, that he had signed an agreement to relocate the Browns to Baltimore in 1996 – a move which would return the NFL to that city for the first time since the Colts relocated to Indianapolis after the 1983 season. Modell chose to relocate the team to Baltimore because he felt the city of Cleveland did not have the funding nor political will to build a first-class stadium. The very next day, on November 7, Cleveland voters overwhelmingly approved the tax issue that Model requested to be placed on the ballot to provide $175 million in tax dollars to refurbish the outmoded and declining Cleveland Municipal Stadium.

The City of Cleveland sued Modell and other entities in City of Cleveland v. Cleveland Browns, et al., Cuyahoga County Court of Common Pleas Case No. CV-95-297833, for breaching the Browns' lease, filing an injunction to keep the Browns in Cleveland until at least 1998. Several other lawsuits were filed by fans and ticket holders. The United States Congress even held hearings on the matter. On the field, the Browns stumbled to finish 5–11 after the announcement, Virtually all of the team's sponsors pulled their support, leaving Cleveland Stadium devoid of advertising during the team's final weeks. The final game the team played at Cleveland Municipal Stadium was a 26–10 victory over the Cincinnati Bengals, the first and only win since the announcement of the relocation.

After extensive talks between the NFL, the Browns, and officials of the two cities, Cleveland accepted a legal settlement that would keep the Browns' legacy in Cleveland. On February 9, 1996, the NFL announced that the Browns would be 'deactivated' for three years, and that a new stadium would be built for a new Browns team, as either an expansion team or a team moved from another city, that would begin play in 1999. Modell would in turn then be granted a new franchise (the 31st NFL franchise), for Baltimore, retaining the current contracts of players and personnel. There would be a reactivated team for Cleveland, where the Browns' name, colors, history, records, awards, and archives would remain in Cleveland.

=== 1999–2007: Browns resume play ===
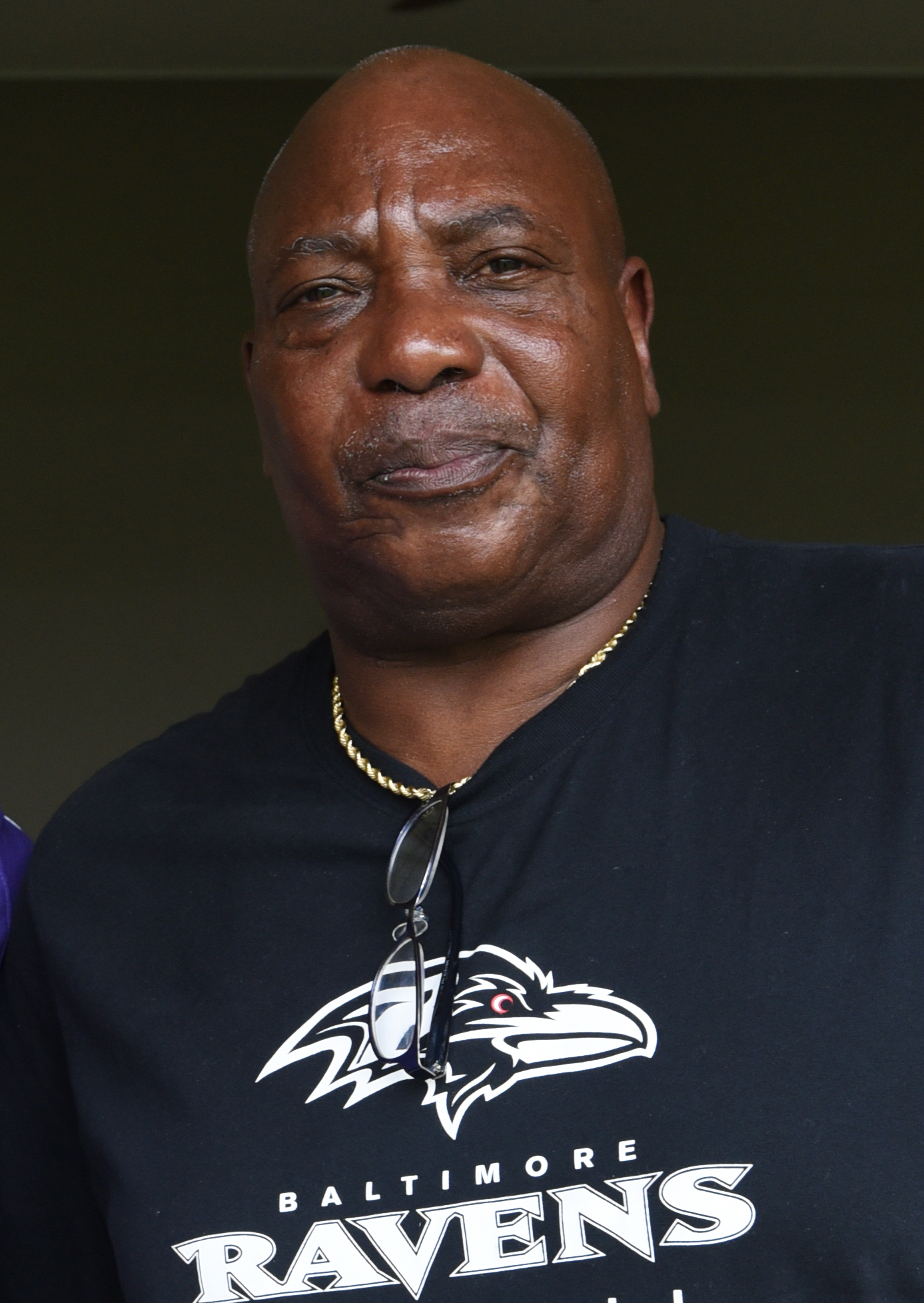
Hall-of-Famer Browns' TE Ozzie Newsome set multiple franchise records and was inducted into the Browns' Ring of Honor. Following his retirement, Newsome transitioned to a role in the Browns' front office. When the franchise moved to Baltimore, he accompanied the team and remains with them to this day. The players he drafted have significantly contributed to the Ravens' status as one of the most successful franchises in the NFL.

The Browns returned to the NFL (effectively as an expansion team) in 1999. The two teams first met on the field on September 26 at Baltimore's PSINet Stadium, a 17–10 Ravens win.

In 2000, the Ravens won Super Bowl XXXV, leaving a bitter taste for Browns fans. Some in the Ohio media believed that had the Browns not moved to Baltimore five years earlier, it would be the Browns claiming their first-ever Super Bowl title.

The Browns collected their first win of the rivalry on October 21, 2001. The Browns' defense had seven sacks and three takeaways on their way to a 24–14 victory. The Browns would complete the sweep of their rivals with a 27–17 win later that season.

On April 8, 2004, Modell sold the controlling interest of the Ravens to then-minority owner Steve Bisciotti. Despite relinquishing control of the Ravens, he was still hated in Cleveland, not only for relocating the Browns, but also for his firing of head coach Paul Brown in 1963. Some considered the Browns' relocation to have cost Modell a spot in the Pro Football Hall of Fame, which is located in Canton, Ohio, 60 miles south of Cleveland. Modell died in 2012, never returning to Cleveland after the move. The Browns were the only home team that did not commemorate Modell's death the following Sunday. The team opted not to do so at the request of David Modell, Art Modell's stepson, who feared that the announcement would be met with anger by Browns fans still upset about the move.

=== 2008–2018: The Harbaugh/Flacco era ===
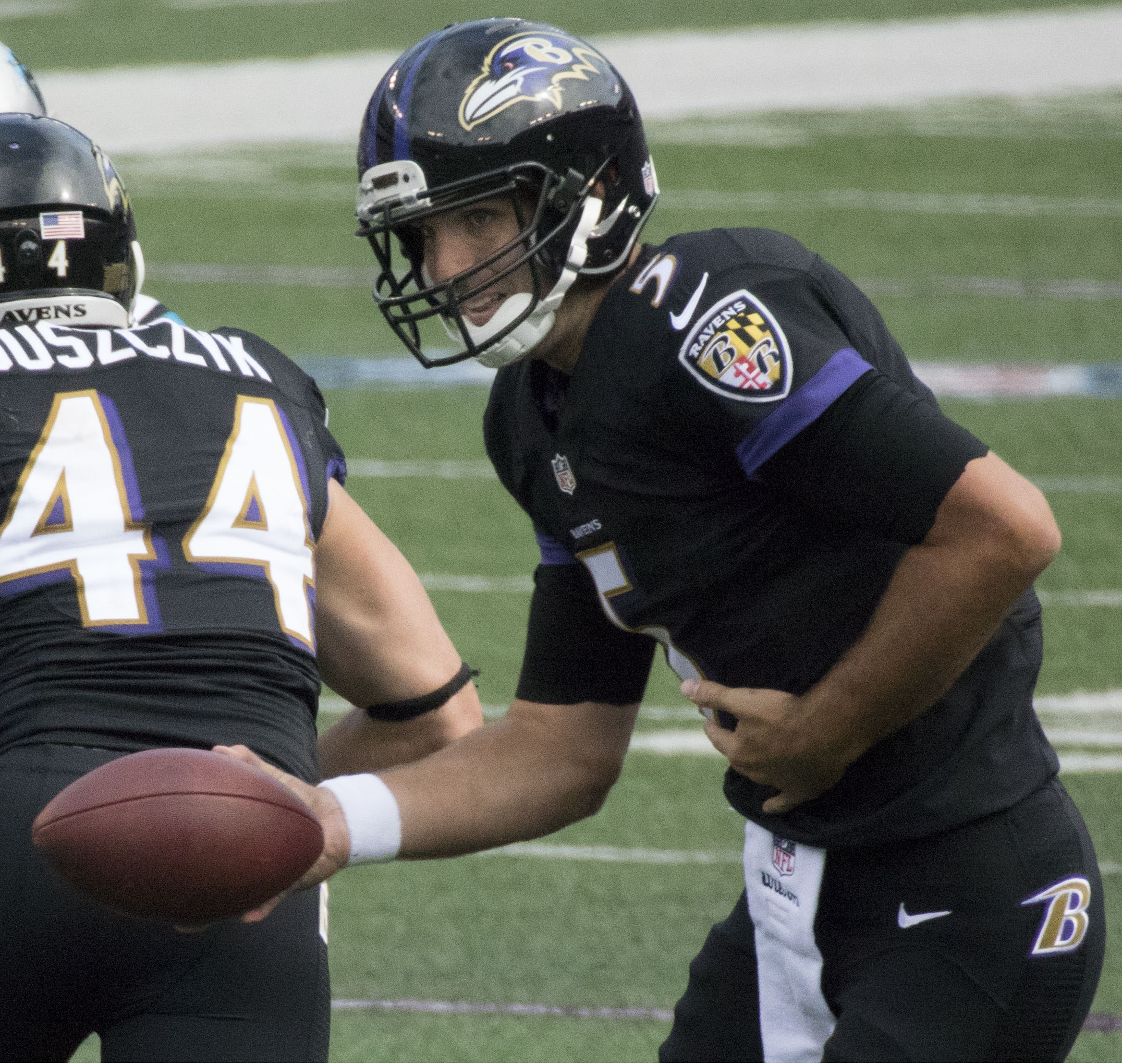
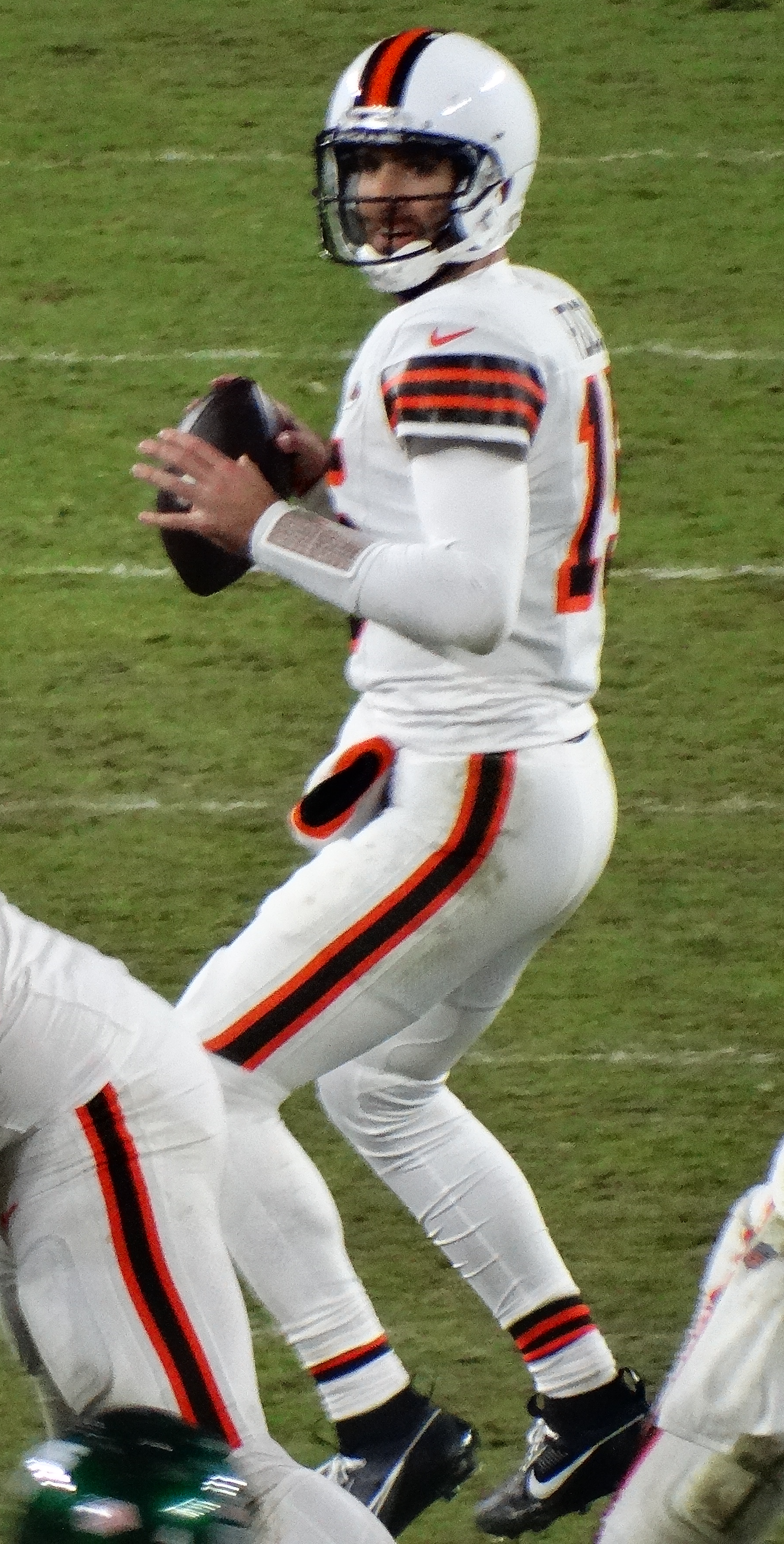
QB Joe Flacco served as the quarterback for the Ravens from 2008–2018 (left), achieving a 17–3 record against the Browns, with an 11–0 start in their matchups. After QB Deshaun Watson suffered a season-ending injury midway through the 2023 season, Flacco signed with the Browns (right), guiding the team to the playoffs and earning the Comeback Player of the Year award.

Prior to the 2008 season, the Ravens hired John Harbaugh as head coach and drafted quarterback Joe Flacco in the first round. These two had an immediate impact on the rivalry as the Ravens would win the next eleven meetings. Overall, as of the 2020 season the Ravens are 21–4 against the Browns under Harbaugh. During this time, the Browns have had six different head coaches.

The Ravens won their second Super Bowl in 2012. This compounded the bitterness some Browns fans had about Modell's move to Baltimore, as it could have been the Browns winning their second Super Bowl. However, there was far less outcry than in 2000 as Art Modell, who had died earlier that season, had sold the team years ago, and the only Browns-era holdover was GM Ozzie Newsome.

On October 11, 2015, Browns tight end Gary Barnidge caught a contested throw from Josh McCown in between his legs after it bounced off his hands onto his posterior. The resulting touchdown, dubbed the "Butt Catch", helped the Browns beat the Ravens in overtime 33–30, marking their first win in Baltimore since 2007. This was Cleveland's last divisional victory until 2018 (see below).

The November 30, 2015 rematch on Monday Night Football was another close game, this time in favor of the Ravens. When the Browns were in position to win the game with a field goal in the closing seconds, Ravens defender Brent Urban blocked the kick, allowing teammate Will Hill to recover the ball and run it in for the game-winning touchdown. The game was noted for numerous Browns fans' reactions to their team's heartbreaking loss and has been considered one of the worst moments in Browns history.

=== 2018–2021: Mayfield vs. Jackson ===
After finishing the 2017 season 0–16, the Browns took 2017 Heisman Trophy winning quarterback Baker Mayfield from Oklahoma 1st overall in the 2018 NFL draft. The Ravens took quarterback and 2016 Heisman Winner Lamar Jackson from Louisville in the same draft, #32 overall.

On October 7, 2018, the Browns defeated the Ravens with a strong defensive performance and 342 passing yards from Mayfield. In another overtime game, the Browns and Ravens traded possessions in the extra period until Mayfield drove Cleveland deep into Baltimore territory to set up the game-winning field goal by Greg Joseph. In week 17 of that season, the Ravens defeated the Browns 26–24 in Baltimore to clinch the AFC North title with Ravens linebacker C.J. Mosley intercepting a pass from Baker Mayfield with just over a minute left to seal the game. The Browns were denied their first winning season since 2007 in the defeat. This game was the first matchup between Mayfield and Jackson, the latter of whom did not become the Ravens' starter until week 11, replacing Joe Flacco.

The Browns won the first meeting of the 2019 season 40–25 behind strong play from Mayfield, running back Nick Chubb and the defense. The Ravens would win the second meeting of the 2019 season 31–15 in which Baltimore, who already won the AFC North crown earlier in the season, would earn homefield advantage throughout the AFC playoffs. With the Ravens win, the Browns were also eliminated from playoff contention and clinched a losing record for the 12th straight season despite being considered a Super Bowl contender by media pundits in the off-season. The teams met again to open the 2020 season in Baltimore in which the Ravens beat the Browns 38-6 off a strong performance from Jackson through the air (275 yards, 3 touchdowns and a passer rating of 152.1).

The highest scoring game in the history of the rivalry came on Monday Night Football December 14, 2020 where both teams combined for nine touchdowns and 89 points. The Ravens won 47–42.

=== 2022–present ===
In the 2022 offseason, after the Browns traded for Houston Texans quarterback Deshaun Watson and signed him to a contract extension, Baker Mayfield requested that the team trade him. Mayfield was traded to the Carolina Panthers for a 2024 fifth-round draft pick.

In the middle of the 2023 season, former Ravens quarterback Joe Flacco became the starter for the Browns after Watson suffered an injury and led Cleveland to a playoff berth. However, they lost in the Wild Card round to the Houston Texans.

== Notable people connected to rivalry ==
- Art Modell - Modell angered many Clevelanders when he moved the Browns, but he won the hearts of Baltimore fans almost instantly by bringing the NFL back to that city 12 years after then Baltimore Colts owner Robert Irsay packed his team and left for Indianapolis in moving vans in 1984. Although still vilified by ardent Browns fans to this day, he still was instrumental in helping his friend, then MBNA corporate president and minority investor Al Lerner, secure the purchase rights of what became the new expansion Browns franchise in 1999 in spring of 1996.
- Ozzie Newsome - The legendary Pro Football Hall of Fame tight end, who played for the Browns from 1978 to 1990, has been a guru in evaluating talent since he followed Modell, who hired him in the Browns' front office in 1992, to Baltimore as the team's new director of player personnel, and then as the team's new GM in 2002, either helping the team draft or drafting such standout players as Hall of Fame players Ray Lewis, Jamal Lewis and Jonathan Ogden and QB Joe Flacco, and trading for or signing standout players such as Steve Smith, Sr. and Priest Holmes, which has, much to the chagrin of Browns' fans, greatly contributed to the Ravens' dominance over Newsome's former team.
- Jamal Lewis - Played for the Ravens for six of his nine NFL seasons, where he regularly torched the Browns defenses, before he signed with the Browns in 2007. Lewis made the Pro Bowl in 2003 after rushing for 2,066 yards; in total, he rushed for 1,000 yards or more 5 of the six years there. In 2007, he was still efficient in rushing for 1,304 yards for the Browns, as he would follow that season up with rush totals of 1,002 yards in 2008 and 500 in 2009 before retiring as a Brown.
- Phil Savage - Began his administrative career with the Browns, as part of the team's scouting department in 1993 with Newsome, before joining him and other Browns personnel to become part of the Ravens' scouting department when the team moved to Baltimore. He then assumed the title of director of player personnel in 2003 for the Ravens. After leaving that job to assume the role of Senior VP and GM in Cleveland in 2005, he was let go in 2008 after a disappointing, injury-filled 4–12 season, with then-head coach Romeo Crennel. This was after the team posted a 10–6 season where they beat the Ravens twice that year.
- Billy Cundiff - Placekicker who played for both the Browns and Ravens. His time with the Ravens was marred by one of the most infamous missed field goals in recent NFL history, which cost Baltimore a chance to beat the New England Patriots and advance to the Super Bowl.

== Season-by-season results ==
Cleveland Browns vs. Baltimore Ravens Season-by-Season Results
1990s–2000s (Ravens, 15–7)

Season	Season series	at Cleveland Browns	at Baltimore Ravens	Overall series	Notes
1999	Ravens 2–0	Ravens; 41–9	Ravens; 17–10	Ravens; 2–0	In a controversial move, Browns owner Art Modell relocated the Cleveland Browns to Baltimore in the 1996 season, where they became the Baltimore Ravens. The Browns returned to the NFL this season.
2000	Ravens 2–0	Ravens; 12–0	Ravens; 44–7	Ravens; 4–0	In Baltimore, Ravens record their largest victory over the Browns with a 37–point differential. Ravens win Super Bowl XXXV
2001	Browns 2–0	Browns; 24–14	Browns; 27–17	Ravens; 4–2	
2002	Tie 1–1	Ravens; 26–21	Browns; 14–13	Ravens; 5–3	
2003	Ravens 2–0	Ravens; 35–0	Ravens; 33–13	Ravens; 7–3	In Baltimore, Ravens' RB Jamal Lewis rushed for 295 yards, setting an NFL record for most rushing yards by one player in a game (broken by Adrian Peterson in 2007).
2004	Tie 1–1	Browns; 20–3	Ravens; 27–13	Ravens; 8–4	In Cleveland, Browns record their largest victory over the Ravens with a 17–point differential.
2005	Tie 1–1	Browns; 20–16	Ravens; 16–3	Ravens; 9–5	
2006	Ravens 2–0	Ravens; 15–14	Ravens; 27–17	Ravens; 11–5	
2007	Browns 2–0	Browns; 27–13	Browns; 33–30 (OT)	Ravens; 11–7	Browns win game in Baltimore in "Phil Dawson game", also their most recent season sweep of the Ravens
2008	Ravens 2–0	Ravens; 37–27	Ravens; 28–10	Ravens; 13–7	Ravens hire head coach John Harbaugh, draft QB Joe Flacco
2009	Ravens 2–0	Ravens; 16–0	Ravens; 34–3	Ravens; 15–7	

2010s (Ravens, 16–4)

Season	Season series	at Cleveland Browns	at Baltimore Ravens	Overall series	Notes
2010	Ravens 2–0	Ravens; 20–10	Ravens; 24–17	Ravens; 17–7	
2011	Ravens 2–0	Ravens; 24–10	Ravens; 20–14	Ravens; 19–7	
2012	Ravens 2–0	Ravens; 25–15	Ravens; 23–16	Ravens; 21–7	Ravens win Super Bowl XLVII.
2013	Tie 1–1	Browns; 24–18	Ravens; 14–6	Ravens; 22–8	Ravens win 11 straight meetings (2008–2013). Browns record their first win over John Harbaugh and Joe Flacco.
2014	Ravens 2–0	Ravens; 23–21	Ravens; 20–10	Ravens; 24–8	In Baltimore, Ravens clinch a playoff berth with their win.
2015	Tie 1–1	Ravens; 33–27	Browns; 33–30 (OT)	Ravens; 25–9	In Cleveland, Ravens' DE Brent Urban blocked a potential game-winning field goal as time expired, leading to S Will Hill returning the ball for a game-winning touchdown.
2016	Ravens 2–0	Ravens; 25–20	Ravens; 28–7	Ravens; 27–9	In Cleveland, Ravens overcame a 20–0 deficit.
2017	Ravens 2–0	Ravens; 27–10	Ravens; 24–10	Ravens; 29–9	Browns complete the second 0-16 season in NFL history.
2018	Tie 1–1	Browns; 12–9 (OT)	Ravens; 26–24	Ravens; 30–10	Ravens clinch the AFC North with their win.
2019	Tie 1–1	Ravens; 31–15	Browns; 40–25	Ravens; 31–11	

2020s (Ravens, 8–5)

Season	Season series	at Cleveland Browns	at Baltimore Ravens	Overall series	Notes
2020	Ravens 2–0	Ravens; 47–42	Ravens; 38–6	Ravens; 33–11	In Cleveland, Browns and Ravens score their most points in a game against one another, while also having the highest-scoring game in the rivalry (89 points). Additionally, both teams combined for nine rushing touchdowns, tying an NFL record. Both teams finished with 11–5 records, but the Ravens clinched the better playoff seed based on their head-to-head sweep.
2021	Tie 1–1	Browns; 24–22	Ravens; 16–10	Ravens; 34–12	
2022	Tie 1–1	Browns; 13–3	Ravens; 23–20	Ravens; 35–13	
2023	Tie 1–1	Ravens; 28–3	Browns; 33–31	Ravens; 36–14	In Baltimore, Browns overcame a 31–17 fourth-quarter deficit. Following a season-ending injury to QB Deshaun Watson, Browns sign former Ravens' QB Joe Flacco.
2024	Tie 1–1	Browns; 29–24	Ravens; 35–10	Ravens; 37–15	Ravens clinch the AFC North with their win in Baltimore.
2025	Ravens 2–0	Ravens; 23–16	Ravens; 41–17	Ravens; 39–15	Longtime Ravens quarterback Joe Flacco returned to Baltimore for the first time as a visitor.
2026	Browns 1–0	Browns; 13–10	December 27	Ravens; 39–16	

Summary of Results

Season	Season series	at Cleveland Browns	at Baltimore Ravens	Notes
Regular Season	Ravens 39–16	Ravens 18–10	Ravens 21–6	

== See also ==
- List of NFL rivalries
- AFC North
- Cleveland Browns relocation controversy
