= Norma Lerner =

American billionaire

- Born: Norma Wolkoff; 1935 or 1936 (age 90–91)
- Spouse: Al Lerner (m. 1955; died 2002)
- Children: Randy Lerner; Nancy Lerner

Norma Lerner (née Wolkoff, born 1935/36) is an American billionaire, the widow of Al Lerner, who was the founder of the credit card company MBNA. As of August 2026, her net worth was estimated at US$1.2 billion.

== Early life ==
She was born Norma Wolkoff, and married Al Lerner in 1955.

== Career ==
Lerner, her son Randy and daughter Nancy owned a 90% stake in the Cleveland Browns after 2002. The Lerners' stake was sold to Jimmy Haslam in 2012. In 2004, Lerner became a member of the Select Committee on the Future of The Cleveland Orchestra. From 2006 to 2011, she was a member of the United States Holocaust Memorial Council, and a member of its executive committee. In 2015, Lerner received a Golden Achievement Award for her work with the Golden Age Centers of Greater Cleveland.

=== Cleveland Clinic ===
She is chair and president of the Lerner Foundation, director of the Cleveland Clinic, co-founder of the Lerner Research Institute, and founder of the Cleveland Clinic Lerner School of Medicine at Case Western Reserve University. Since the Lerner School of Medicine's opening, Lerner has met with incoming classes of students for lunch. She also established the Cleveland Clinic Children's Lerner School for Autism. She served as distinguished chair of the clinic's "Today's Innovations, Tomorrow's Healthcare".

== Personal life ==
In 1955, she married Al Lerner. They were married for 47 years and had two children, business executive Randy Lerner, and Nancy Lerner. The Lerners were members of Temple Tifereth-Israel in Cleveland. Lerner is widowed, and lives in Cleveland, Ohio.
