= Bob Kain =

American sports business executive

Bob Kain is an American sports business executive. He joined sports and lifestyle management and marketing firm IMG in 1976, and was named director of IMG Tennis in 1983, CEO of IMG Americas in 2001, and co-CEO of the company in 2003.

He represented tennis players such as Billie Jean King, Chris Evert, Björn Borg, John McEnroe, Andre Agassi and Pete Sampras. He also co-founded touring figure skating show Stars on Ice in 1986.

In 2004 he married figure skater Rosalynn Sumners.

In September 2006, Kain became a board member of Aston Villa following Randy Lerner's acquisition of the club.
