= Nicholas Padfield =

English barrister, recorder, and deputy High Court judge (born 1947)

Nicholas David Padfield KC (born 5 August 1947) is an English barrister, recorder, and deputy High Court judge in the Queen's Bench Division.

Padfield is the son of David Padfield and his wife Sushila, daughter of the eminent Indian educationist Sir Samuel Runganadhan. He was educated at the Dragon School, Charterhouse School, University College, Oxford, where he graduated MA, and Trinity Hall, Cambridge, taking a LLB degree in international law. While at Oxford, he played hockey for the university and for England.

He was called to the bar from the Inner Temple in 1972, was appointed a Queen's Counsel (QC) in 1991, and was elected a bencher of the Inner Temple in 1995. He was appointed a Recorder in 1995 and a deputy judge in 2008. He is a Freeman of the City of London and his chambers are at One Hare Court, Temple.

He made headlines in 2006 by heading a business consortium named AV06, one of the parties interested in taking over the ownership of Aston Villa F. C. Following a bid from American businessman Randy Lerner of approximately £63 million, AV06 revealed their intentions to submit a £70 million offer. However, this bid was never made and Lerner took control of the club.
