= Randy Lerner =

American businessman (born 1962)

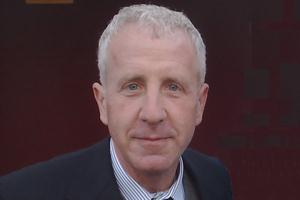
- Lerner in 2008
- Born: Randolph David Lerner; February 21, 1962 (age 64); New York City, U.S.
- Education: Columbia University; Columbia Law School; Clare College, Cambridge
- Occupation: Owner of MBNA Corporation
- Children: 4
- Parent(s): Alfred Lerner; Norma Wolkoff

Randolph David Lerner (born February 21, 1962) is an American billionaire businessman and former sports team owner. He became the majority owner of the American football team, the Cleveland Browns, of the National Football League (NFL), upon the death of his father Alfred Lerner in 2002, and sold the team in 2012. Lerner became the owner and chairman of English club Aston Villa F.C. of the Premier League in 2006; Lerner sold the club at a loss in 2016 following their relegation. As of July 2024, Forbes estimated his net worth at US$1.2 billion.

== Early life ==
Lerner was born to a Jewish family and graduated from Columbia University in 1984, spending 1983 at Clare College, Cambridge. He graduated from Columbia Law School and is a member of the New York and District of Columbia bar associations. He has worked as a lawyer in New York City.

== Business career ==
Lerner began working as an investment analyst at automobile insurers Progressive Corporation. In 1991, his father started an independent investment firm with Progressive capital called Securities Advisors, Inc. (SAI), which Al owned and managed until 2001. SAI initially specialized in arbitrage before shifting its focus to equity investing.

His father, Alfred "Al" Lerner, had been appointed chairman of MBNA Corporation when it went public in 1991, after investing $100 million of his own money into it. In 1993, Randy Lerner became a director at MBNA. Upon the death of his father in 2002, he became MBNA's chairman. On January 1, 2006, Bank of America acquired MBNA Corporation for US$35 billion.

== Sports team ownership ==
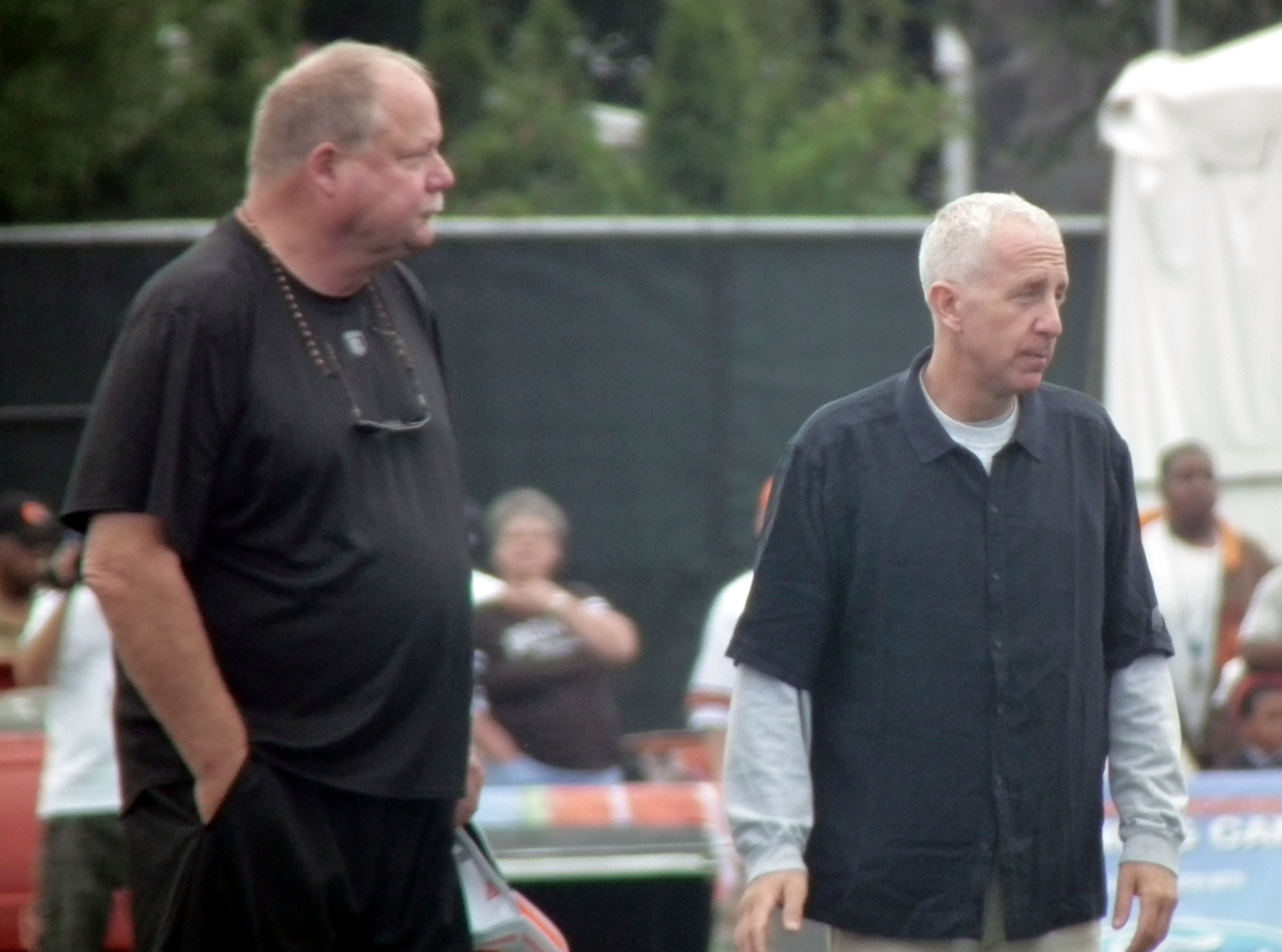
Lerner (right), along with Team President Mike Holmgren, observing a Cleveland Browns practice session (2012)

=== Cleveland Browns ===
When his father, Alfred Lerner, died in October 2002 – four years to the day after he was awarded the new Browns franchise - the ownership of the team passed on to Lerner. Lerner served as a member of the National Football League's Business Ventures Committee. In 2012, Lerner sold the team to businessman Jimmy Haslam.

=== Aston Villa F.C. ===
During his time at Cambridge, Lerner followed English football, taking an interest in three teams: Arsenal, Fulham and Aston Villa. Although he had grown up in the United States, with a father who had been involved with the Cleveland Browns franchise under Art Modell, Lerner's interest in English top flight football endured long after he had returned to the United States.

In August 2006, it was confirmed Lerner had reached a £62.6m agreement with Premier League club Aston Villa to take over the club. The statement to the London Stock Exchange confirmed that 60% of the club's shares, including the 39% stake of Doug Ellis had been sold to Lerner, beating competition from consortia led by Michael Neville, Nicholas Padfield QC, and Athole Still. Eleven days after the announcement, the LSE confirmed that Lerner had secured 59.69% of Villa shares, making him the majority shareholder. Lerner appointed himself Chairman of the Board of the club.

The BBC reported in September 2006 that Lerner had moved closer to taking full control of the club, after increasing his share to 85.5%.

By the time that the deadline passed in September 2006, Lerner had secured the acceptance of 89.69% of the shareholders. Due to the acceptance only being 0.31% below the conditional limit, Lerner accepted it and made the bid unconditional. On September 19, 2006, Aston Villa PLC executive chairman Doug Ellis and his board resigned, and were replaced by Randy Lerner as chairman with Charles Krulak, Bob Kain and Michael Martin serving as non-executive directors. At the close of the deal in 2006, Lerner became only the second American owner of a Premiership club.

In June 2011, Lerner appointed manager Alex McLeish, who was previously working from local rivals Birmingham City F.C.. McLeish's contract was terminated at the end of the 2011–12 season after Villa finished in 16th place, just above the relegation zone. On July 2, 2012, Aston Villa confirmed the appointment of former Norwich City manager Paul Lambert.

In February 2012, the club announced a financial loss of £53.9 million. Lerner put the club up for sale on May 12, 2014, with an estimated value of £200 million.

Lambert was sacked on February 11, 2015 and replaced by Tim Sherwood, who saved Villa from relegation in the 2014/15 season and took them to the 2015 FA Cup Final. Sherwood was sacked on October 25, 2015, after six consecutive league losses, with Kevin MacDonald taking over as interim manager. On November 2, 2015, Frenchman Rémi Garde agreed a three-and-a-half-year deal to become the manager and was sacked after 147 days.

In April 2016, two members of Villa's board of directors, former Football Association chairman David Bernstein and Lord King submitted their resignations to Villa Chairman Steve Hollis. Their resignation was due to them being "increasingly frustrated at the lack of progress they were able to make" at the club. There had also occurred, reportedly, a "hostile interaction" between them and owner Randy Lerner.

In May 2016, Lerner sold Aston Villa to Chinese businessman Tony Xia and his Recon Group following Villa's relegation to the Football League Championship. Many supporters and former players blamed Lerner for being inactive and failed to invest significantly since the departure of Martin O'Neill in 2010 and also selling their best players.

== Philanthropy ==
Lerner has supported the UK's National Portrait Gallery since 2002. In January 2008, it was announced that Lerner had donated £5m to the gallery, the largest single donation it has ever received. In recognition, the ground floor galleries were named "The Lerner Galleries".

For the 2008/2009 and 2009/2010 seasons, Aston Villa forwent traditional shirt sponsorship by instead wearing on their shirts the name of a local children's hospice, Acorns. For the 2010/2011 season, this sponsor was replaced by corporate sponsor FxPro, but the club continued to promote Acorns on all children's kits as the club's official charity partner.

Lerner is an alumnus and major benefactor to Clare College, Cambridge and was honored in 2008 with a namesake space called "Lerner Court".

== Personal life ==
Lerner has a house in Amagansett, New York, where he owns the Community Square shopping complex. The Wall Street Journal reported that, between 2007 and 2011, Cleveland Browns Transportation was the most frequent flyer in and out of East Hampton Airport. In July 2019, a limited liability company whose principal is Randy Lerner purchased property near Stony Hill Road in Amagansett. The property is protected in perpetuity by a conservation easement granted to the Peconic Land Trust who filed suit against Lerner and the limited liability company after 75 to 125 trees were cut down.

Sporting positions
Preceded by Al Lerner	Cleveland Browns owner 2002–2012	Succeeded by Jimmy Haslam; Dee Haslam
