= Al Lerner =

American businessman

Alfred Lerner
- Born: Alfred Lerner; May 8, 1933; New York City, New York, U.S.
- Died: October 23, 2002 (aged 69); Cleveland, Ohio, U.S.
- Resting place: Lake View Cemetery, Cleveland, Ohio
- Education: Brooklyn Technical High School
- Alma mater: Columbia University
- Occupations: Businessman, CEO, entrepreneur
- Known for: Owner of the Cleveland Browns (1998–2002)
- Successor: Randy Lerner
- Spouse: Norma Wolkoff
- Children: Randy and Nancy

Alfred Lerner (May 8, 1933 – October 23, 2002) was an American businessman. He was best known as the chair of the board of credit card giant MBNA and the owner of the Cleveland Browns of the National Football League (NFL) from 1998-2002. He was also a past president of the Board of Trustees of the Cleveland Clinic as well as a major benefactor.

== Early life and education ==
Born in Brooklyn, New York, Lerner was the only son of Russian-Jewish immigrants. His parents owned a small candy store and sandwich shop in Queens, New York. He attended Brooklyn Technical High School and then Columbia College, the liberal arts college at Columbia University, graduating in 1955. While attending Columbia College, Lerner was initiated into the Delta chapter of Zeta Beta Tau fraternity. He served as a pilot in the United States Marines from 1955 to 1957, serving in Quantico, Virginia and Pensacola, Florida.

== Career ==
After the Marines, Lerner began selling furniture, earning $75 a week. eventually saving enough money to buy an apartment building in Cleveland, Ohio. His real estate portfolio grew and in 1990, he became a major shareholder in MNC Financial, the parent corporation of Maryland National Bank, which was at the time the largest bank headquartered in the State of Maryland. Struggling with real estate loans in the midst of the savings and loan crisis, MNC soon needed leadership and Lerner stepped in as chief executive officer. He tried unsuccessfully to sell the bank's most successful unit, credit card issuer MBNA, to raise cash. In 1991, he took MBNA public, investing $100 million of his own money to ensure the success of the initial sale of stock. Controversial MBNA would blossom into the second largest credit card issuer.

He was also the chairman of Town and Country Trust, which owns and operates more than 15,000 apartment units in the mid-Atlantic region.

=== Cleveland Browns ===
In 1998, Lerner purchased the franchise rights of Cleveland Browns of the National Football League paying $530 million, a record for a sports franchise at the time, outdistancing the next closest bid by $30 million. The runner-up bid was from Cablevision Systems chairman Charles Dolan and his brother and future Cleveland Indians owner Larry Dolan.

Prior to that, Lerner held a 5% stake in the old Cleveland Browns franchise. In 1995, he assisted his friend at the time Art Modell, former owner of the Browns, in moving Modell's NFL franchise rights from Cleveland to Baltimore. Lerner introduced Modell to Baltimore financiers of the deal, and he sat behind on the podium at Modell's press conference announcing the team's move. However, many Browns fans were angered after word leaked that Modell's deal to move the Browns to Baltimore was signed on Lerner's private jet. One attorney for season ticket holders that had sued Modell later stated, “I view, in many respects, Lerner as big of a culprit in this, if not a bigger one than Modell. It was very clear from the stuff that we saw that Lerner egged him on and supported his decision to leave and then tried to run away from responsibility when the shit hit the fan.” The two stopped talking shortly thereafter. In 1997, Modell paid $32 million to buy out Lerner's stake in the Baltimore Ravens, which had grown to 9%.

After his death, his wife Norma and son Randy Lerner took over the Browns franchise. Lerner's initials were stitched on the sleeves of the Browns jerseys every season until the 2013 NFL season when they were removed from the jerseys under new team owner Jimmy Haslam.

== Personal life and death ==
In 1955, Lerner married his wife Norma Wolkoff. They were married for 47 years and had two children, business executive Randy Lerner, and Nancy Lerner Beck. The Lerners were members of Temple Tifereth-Israel in Cleveland.

He was extremely private and shunned the limelight. He was proud of being a United States Marine and flew a Marine Corps flag atop the stadium during the entire time he owned the Browns. Additionally, he flew the Cleveland Browns football team flag at all MBNA America corporate sites along with the American flag and State flags. Cleveland native and fellow United States Marine Drew Carey paid tribute to Lerner at the end of a season 8 episode of The Drew Carey Show called "The Dawn Patrol".

Lerner was diagnosed with brain cancer in 2001 and that May underwent surgery, spending most of his last year in and out of hospitals. He died on October 23, 2002, and was buried at Lake View Cemetery in Cleveland, Ohio.

== Legacy ==
Lerner gave generously to numerous hospitals and universities. His favorite charities were the Cleveland Clinic and his alma mater Columbia University, both of which received multiple large gifts. He was president of the Cleveland Clinic Foundation and donated over $100 million to the hospital system to establish the Cleveland Clinic Lerner College of Medicine at Case Western Reserve University School of Medicine. Lerner's estate also donated $10 million toward the construction of the National Museum of the Marine Corps.

Lerner donated approximately $25 million toward the construction of a new Columbia University student center in 1999, which was named Alfred Lerner Hall in his honor. In 2007, Columbia announced it would honor Lerner's military service in the United States Marine Corps with a plaque to be placed in Lerner Hall.

The College of Business and Economics is named after him at the University of Delaware.

In 1997, a Golden Palm Star on the Palm Springs, California, Walk of Stars was dedicated to him.

In 1999, Lerner received the Golden Plate Award of the American Academy of Achievement. His award was presented by Awards Council member General Charles C. Krulak, the 31st Commandant of the United States Marine Corps.

In the Cleveland area, Lerner is honored in various ways:

- University Hospitals of Cleveland has a building named after him (Alfred & Norma Lerner Tower)
- The street in front of Cleveland Browns Stadium is renamed "Alfred Lerner Way"
- A statue in Lerner's likeness is in front of the Browns headquarters in suburban Berea, Ohio.

Among awards he received, Lerner won the Horatio Alger Award and the John Jay Award.

Sporting positions
| Preceded by Art Modell | Cleveland Browns owner 1998–2002 | Succeeded by Randy Lerner |
