= MLS Cup 2023 =

2023 edition of the MLS Cup

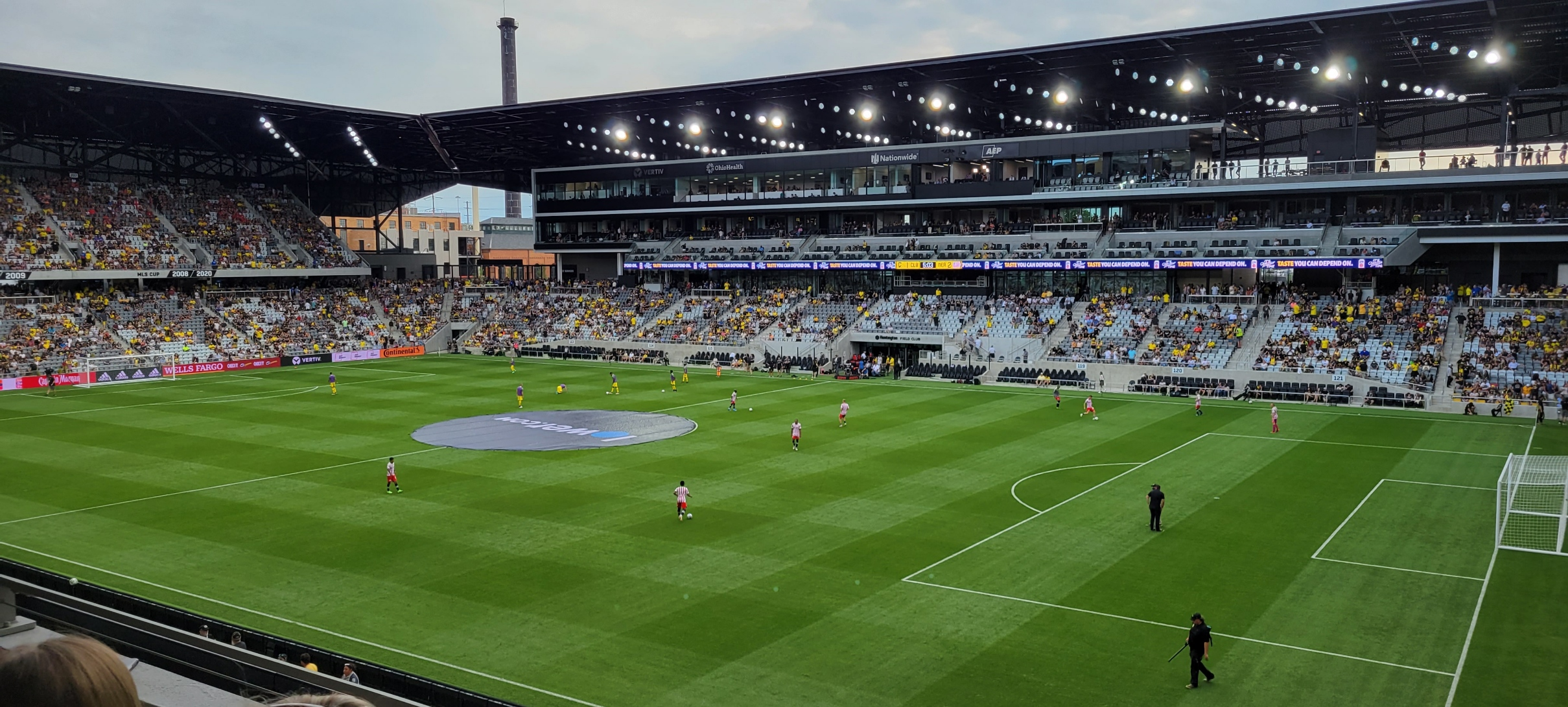
- The match was played at Lower.com Field in Columbus, Ohio
- Event: MLS Cup
Columbus Crew	Los Angeles FC
2	1
- Date: December 9, 2023
- Venue: Lower.com Field, Columbus, Ohio, U.S.
- MLS Cup MVP: Cucho Hernández (Columbus Crew)
- Referee: Armando Villarreal
- Attendance: 20,802
- Weather: Rainy, 54 °F (12 °C)

MLS Cup 2023 was the 28th edition of the MLS Cup, the championship match of Major League Soccer (MLS), played on December 9, 2023, at Lower.com Field in Columbus, Ohio, United States. The soccer match between hosts Columbus Crew of the Eastern Conference and defending champions Los Angeles FC of the Western Conference determined the champions of the 2023 season. It also marked the conclusion of the MLS Cup playoffs, which was contested by the top eighteen teams based on their regular season records.

Columbus won 2–1 and clinched their third MLS Cup title. Cucho Hernández was named the match's most valuable player after he scored the opening goal from a penalty kick. The Crew earned a berth in the 2024 CONCACAF Champions Cup and host the 2024 Campeones Cup.

== Road to the final ==
The MLS Cup is the post-season championship of Major League Soccer (MLS), a professional club soccer league in the United States and Canada. The 2023 season was the 28th in MLS history and was contested by 29 teams organized into the Eastern and Western conferences. Each club played 34 matches during the regular season from March to October, facing each team in their conference at least twice and some teams in the other conference once. The MLS Cup playoffs, which ran from late October to early December, were expanded to include the top nine teams in each conference playing over five rounds. Most rounds were a single-elimination match hosted by the higher-seeded team; the exception was round one, which was a best-of-three series with the first and third (if necessary) match hosted by the higher-seeded team.

The finalists, Columbus Crew and Los Angeles FC, both finished third in their respective conferences. They did not play each other during the 2023 regular season, but Los Angeles has won all three prior meetings with a combined goal difference of 7–0. The winner of the MLS Cup earned a bye to the round of 16 in the 2024 CONCACAF Champions Cup, the premier club competition for the continental confederation. The Crew had already qualified for the tournament as one of the top three teams in the regular season Supporters' Shield standings. As MLS Cup winners, Columbus also hosted the 2024 Campeones Cup, which was played against Club América, the winner of the Campeón de Campeones from Mexico.

=== Columbus Crew ===
The Columbus Crew was one of the ten teams from the inaugural MLS season and appeared in three previous editions of the MLS Cup, winning in 2008 and 2020, and losing in 2015. An attempt to relocate the franchise to Austin, Texas, in 2018 was prevented through the sale to an ownership group led by Jimmy Haslam. During the 2022 season, the team finished two points short of a playoff berth and failed to qualify for the postseason for the second consecutive year. Columbus finished the season with sixteen draws and only eight losses under head coach Caleb Porter, who was dismissed after the last match of the year. He was replaced in December by Wilfried Nancy, who was hired from CF Montréal alongside three of his assistant coaches. Nancy and general manager Tim Bezbatchenko made few acquisitions during the offseason, signing Christian Ramirez from Scottish side Aberdeen, and traded away veteran players Jonathan Mensah and Artur.

The team opened the season playing a possession-oriented style favored by Nancy that used players on the wing to create opportunities to attack and score. During their first seven matches, the Crew scored seventeen goals and earned four wins—including three in a row in the lead up to their first away win. Starting goalkeeper Eloy Room was injured in late March and replaced by Patrick Schulte, in his rookie season after a stint in reserve league MLS Next Pro; Schulte ultimately won the starting role due to his compatibility with Nancy's system. Columbus won once in a seven-match stretch in April and May, including three consecutive losses, which dropped them to tenth place in the Eastern Conference.

The Crew began an unbeaten streak at the end of May that lasted until July with five wins and three draws in eight matches; the streak ended with a road loss to the Portland Timbers just prior to the 2023 Leagues Cup group stage during a suspension for Nancy for "irresponsible behavior" in a prior match. Columbus finished atop their group in the Leagues Cup, ahead of Club América and St. Louis City SC, but were eliminated in their first knockout match against Minnesota United FC. The summer transfer window saw the departure of Room to the Netherlands, attacking midfielder Lucas Zelarayán to Saudi Arabia, and defender Miloš Degenek to Serbia. The club then acquired wingback Julian Gressel from Vancouver Whitecaps FC and Diego Rossi from Fenerbahçe in Turkey to replace Zelarayán and provide more attacking options.

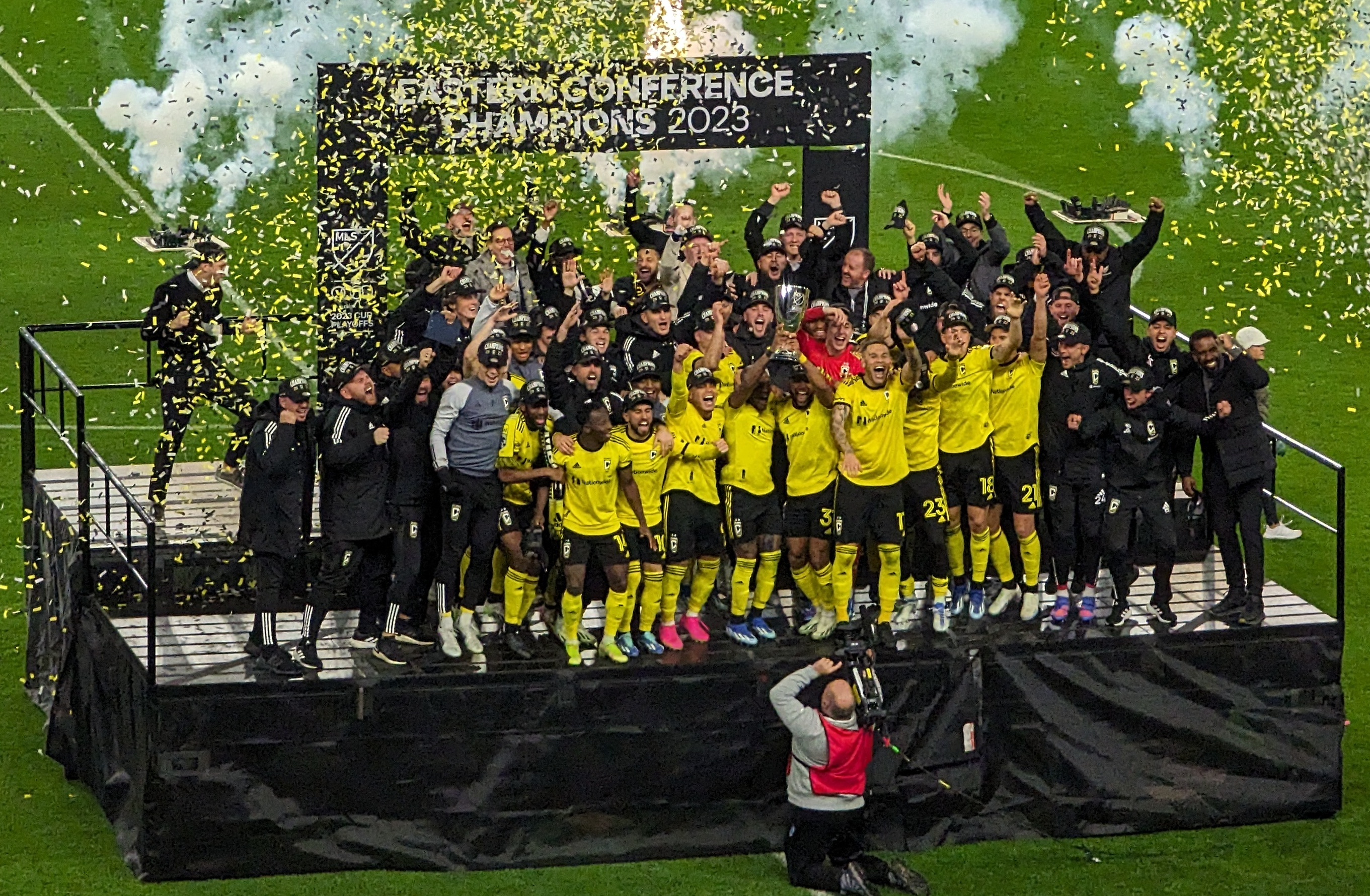
Columbus Crew celebrates after they defeated FC Cincinnati in the Eastern Conference final.

The regular season resumed in mid-August with Columbus at sixth place in the Eastern Conference standings and improved to fifth following a pair of victories against rivals FC Cincinnati and Toronto FC. The Crew lost only two of their remaining matches—on the road to Houston Dynamo FC and Orlando City SC—and clinched a playoff berth on September 20 with a 3–0 victory against Chicago Fire FC. The team finished third in the Eastern Conference, their best league performance since 2009, and were the league's highest scoring team with 67 goals during the regular season. Cucho Hernández led the team in scoring with sixteen goals—the fourth-highest total among MLS players in 2023—and was named to the MLS Best XI. Columbus also maintained an unbeaten streak of fifteen matches at home and earned home-field advantage in the first round of the playoffs.

The Crew faced sixth-seeded Atlanta United FC in round one, which was a best-of-three series with no extra time. In the first leg at home, the first playoff match to be played at Lower.com Field, Columbus won 2–0 through a pair of goals from Hernández, while the away side were without key midfielder Thiago Almada. The team were unable to clinch a playoff sweep the following week in Atlanta, where they lost 4–2 in the second leg. The hosts withstood a Columbus equalizer to take the lead at half-time and scored two more times after the 80th minute to force a third match in the series. In the deciding match at home, the Crew scored three goals in the first half and won 4–2 to advance to the conference semifinals in Orlando, Florida.

With a 2–0 win against Orlando City SC in extra time, Columbus broke a sixteen-match winless streak in road playoff matches that began in 2002. Shortly after an extra time substitution, Ramírez opened the scoring for the visitors in the 93rd minute and was followed by Hernández in the 118th minute. The Eastern Conference final was hosted by Supporters' Shield winners FC Cincinnati, rivals to Columbus in the Hell is Real derby, and would also decide the host of the MLS Cup final. FC Cincinnati led 2–0 at half-time with a Brandon Vázquez strike and stoppage time free kick by Luciano Acosta; the hosts were able to maintain a shutout despite the suspension of defender Matt Miazga and the Crew's advantage in possession. After a pair of substitutions and adjustments from Nancy, Columbus rallied to score twice before the end of regulation time—an own goal by Alvas Powell created by Gressel's cross and an equalizer from Diego Rossi in the 86th minute. Ramírez scored the winning goal in the 115th minute and clinched a 3–2 victory for the Crew that sent the team to the MLS Cup final.

=== Los Angeles FC ===
Los Angeles FC (LAFC) entered MLS as an expansion team in 2018, becoming the third club based in the Los Angeles area following the folding of Chivas USA a few years prior. In their second season, they won the Supporters' Shield, and were a finalist in the 2020 CONCACAF Champions League the following year. Under first-year head coach Steve Cherundolo in 2022, LAFC won the Supporters' Shield with 67 points—tied with the Philadelphia Union but ahead on the total wins tiebreaker—and the MLS Cup at home. During the offseason, the team lost Gareth Bale to retirement, Cristian Arango to a transfer, and Latif Blessing in the expansion draft. Defender Aaron Long was acquired through free agency and midfielder Timothy Tillman was signed from Germany, but LAFC ended the winter transfer window with an open Designated Player slot.

The team were scheduled to open the regular season against crosstown El Tráfico rivals LA Galaxy, but the match at the Rose Bowl was postponed due to regional floods and potential thunderstorms. LAFC were undefeated in their first eight matches of the regular season while also competing in the CONCACAF Champions League, where they finished as runners-up. The team moved to the top of the Western Conference in late May, ahead of the Champions League final, but faced an 18-day stretch in June with six matches due to fixtures that were rescheduled to accommodate the continental campaign. LAFC lost four matches during the stretch as well as the postponed Rose Bowl fixture on July 4 and dropped to third in the conference standings.

As defending MLS Cup champions, LAFC had a bye to the knockout stage of the Leagues Cup and won two matches, before being eliminated by Monterrey in the quarterfinals. During the summer transfer window, the team traded forward Kwadwo Opoku to Montreal and lost midfielder José Cifuentes to Rangers in Scotland, freeing up space for several attacking players on under-22 and Designated Player contracts. Filip Krastev joined on loan from Lommel alongside forward Mario González and midfielder Cristian Olivera in August. LAFC returned to regular season action with a win against the Colorado Rapids, but lost their next three matches and remained third in the West. The team finished the regular season with one loss in their final seven matches and clinched the third seed in the West with a draw against Vancouver Whitecaps FC on Decision Day. Denis Bouanga led the league in scoring and won the MLS Golden Boot with twenty goals and seven assists during the regular season.

The team faced Vancouver again in round one of the playoffs, which began with a 5–2 win at home. Bouanga and defender Ryan Hollingshead each scored twice and were joined by Jesús Murillo after the lead was lost twice in the first half by the Whitecaps scoring equalizers. LAFC completed their sweep of the best-of-three series with a 1–0 win in Vancouver; the lone goal was scored by Bouanga from a penalty kick in the first half. A second goal for Bouanga in stoppage time was voided by the video assistant referee due to an offside; the play also included referee Tim Ford's obstruction of a Whitecaps player, which resulted in the ejection of coach Vanni Sartini. LAFC traveled to face second-seeded Seattle Sounders FC in the conference semifinals and won 1–0 with a Bouanga goal and several saves by goalkeeper Maxime Crépeau. The match, which ended a nineteen-match home unbeaten streak in the playoffs for the Sounders, was marked by allegations of unbalanced calls from the referees, including a potential red card offense that was not reviewed.

LAFC hosted the Western Conference final against fourth-place Houston Dynamo FC, who had defeated them in two consecutive matches in June. Hollingshead scored before half-time from a rebound off goalkeeper Steve Clark, who had saved a header by Giorgio Chiellini on a corner kick. Chiellini led the team's defense to a shutout despite the Dynamo's possession and creative play; an own goal in the 80th minute from LAFC-turned-Houston defender Franco Escobar gave the home side a 2–0 victory and clinched a second consecutive Western Conference championship. Steve Cherundolo became the third head coach to lead a team to the MLS Cup final in his first two seasons after Bruce Arena with D.C. United and Brian Schmetzer with Seattle Sounders FC. The MLS Cup final was the team's 53rd competitive match in 2023—the most for an MLS team in a single year—due to their participation in the Champions League, Leagues Cup, U.S. Open Cup, and the Campeones Cup. LAFC traveled over 63,000 miles (101,000 km) during their season, which lasted 41 weeks.

=== Summary of results ===
Note: In all results below, the score of the finalist is given first (H: home; A: away).

Columbus Crew				Round	Los Angeles FC			
3rd place in Eastern Conference MLS Eastern Conference table (2023): Pos / Team / Pld / Pts; 1 / FC Cincinnati / 34 / 69; 2 / Orlando City SC / 34 / 63; 3 / Columbus Crew / 34 / 57; 4 / Philadelphia Union / 34 / 55; 5 / New England Revolution / 34 / 55; 6 / Atlanta United FC / 34 / 51; 7 / Nashville SC / 34 / 49; Source: MLS Qualified for playoffs Qualified for CONCACAF Champions Cup				Regular season	3rd place in Western Conference MLS Western Conference table (2023): Pos / Team / Pld / Pts; 1 / St. Louis City SC / 34 / 56; 2 / Seattle Sounders FC / 34 / 53; 3 / Los Angeles FC / 34 / 52; 4 / Houston Dynamo FC / 34 / 51; 5 / Real Salt Lake / 34 / 50; 6 / Vancouver Whitecaps FC / 34 / 48; 7 / FC Dallas / 34 / 46; Source: MLS Qualified for playoffs Qualified for CONCACAF Champions Cup			
Opponent (Games)	1st leg	2nd leg	3rd leg	MLS Cup playoffs	Opponent (Games)	1st leg	2nd leg	3rd leg
Atlanta United FC (2–1)	2–0 (H)	2–4 (A)	4–2 (H)	Round one	Vancouver Whitecaps FC (2–0)	5–2 (H)	1–0 (A)	—
Opponent	Score				Opponent	Score		
Orlando City SC	2–0 (a.e.t.) (A)			Conference semifinals	Seattle Sounders FC	1–0 (A)		
FC Cincinnati	3–2 (a.e.t.) (A)			Conference finals	Houston Dynamo FC	2–0 (H)		

== Venue ==
The final was played at Lower.com Field, a 20,371-seat soccer-specific stadium that is home to the Columbus Crew. The Crew won hosting rights as the highest-remaining seed in the playoffs. The stadium opened in July 2021 to replace Historic Crew Stadium, the first soccer-specific venue built for an MLS team. The 2023 final is the fourth MLS Cup to be played in Columbus, with the 2001, 2015, and 2020 finals all played at Historic Crew Stadium. Lower.com Field previously hosted the finals for the MLS Next Pro Cup in 2022 and 2023, which both featured reserve team Columbus Crew 2. The Crew offered free rally towels to 18,000 attendees and opened its fan festival at the stadium four hours prior to kickoff.

Tickets for the final were distributed by MLS and Ticketmaster with a public sale scheduled for December 5 following a series of pre-sales for league sponsors and Columbus season ticket holders. The online code for the league presale was leaked and resulted in sellouts for many sections, including the Nordecke supporter's section, with seats instead listed for scalped for resale on the secondary ticket markets. The Crew announced that the presale tickets would be cancelled and a new presale for season ticket holders would begin the following day, with public sales also delayed by a day.

== Broadcasting ==
The MLS Cup final was broadcast worldwide for free in English and Spanish on MLS Season Pass, a subscription streaming service operated by Apple under their Apple TV+ brand. The Apple broadcast included a one-hour pregame show, a post-match show, more than 20 cameras, and a drone for overhead shots. The English commentary team for Apple's broadcast includes play-by-play commentator Jake Zivin, color analyst Taylor Twellman, and sideline reporter Katie Witham; the Spanish team comprises play-by-play commentator Sammy Sadovnik, color analyst Eduardo Biscayart, and sideline reporter Antonella Gonzalez.

In the United States, the match was also carried on terrestrial television by Fox Sports in English and Fox Deportes in Spanish. The English broadcast team for Fox comprises commentator John Strong, analyst Stu Holden, and reporter Jenny Taft. The Fox broadcast drew a 0.41 Nielsen rating with an average of 815,000 viewers, while Fox Deportes had 75,000 viewers; the combined viewership of 890,000 was less than half of the 2022 broadcast on Fox and Univision. In Canada, TSN carried the match in English and sister station Réseau des sports (RDS) broadcast it in French.

In the Columbus area, the final was also broadcast on radio station WBNS with play-by-play commentary from Chris Doran. In the Los Angeles area, the match was carried on radio stations KSPN in English and 980 AM La Mera Mera in Spanish.

== Match ==
=== Summary ===
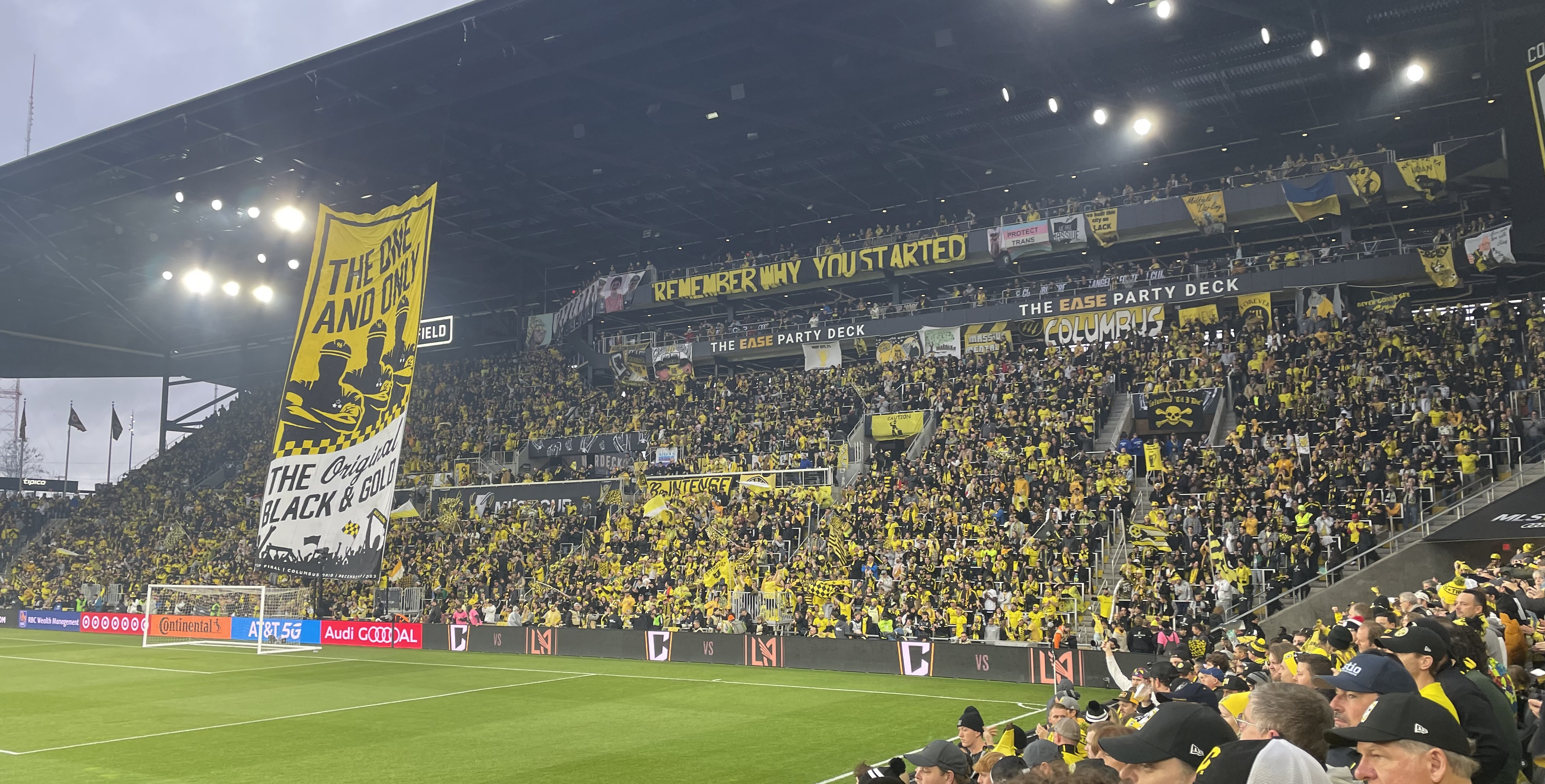
A tifo raised by Columbus Crew supporters in the Nordecke prior to kick-off

The MLS Cup final set a new attendance record for Lower.com Field with 20,802 spectators, including 1,700 LAFC supporters. The Crew had the majority of possession in the first half and limited chances for Los Angeles to counterattack. The continued pressure in LAFC's penalty area led to a handball by Diego Palacios that earned the Crew a penalty kick, which was converted in the 33rd minute by Cucho Hernández. Heavy rain began to fall after the goal as the Crew continued to press forward. After Aidan Morris intercepted a pass by Ryan Hollingshead, the Crew made 11 passes upfield to reach Yaw Yeboah, who scored the second goal of the match, with Matthew Doyle of MLSsoccer.com describing it as "the most beautiful goal in MLS Cup history."

The Crew led 2–0 at half-time, having avoided a potential own goal in stoppage time. LAFC responded by sending more players upfield and leaving themselves vulnerable to counterattacks; an attempt by Yeboah was saved off the goal line by Palacios early in the half. Denis Bouanga scored in the 74th minute from a rebound after his first shot was saved by goalkeeper Patrick Schulte with his face. Schulte was treated on-field after the play but was able to continue. The Crew were able to prevent an equalizer from LAFC and won 2–1 to clinch their third MLS Cup title.

=== Details ===
December 9, 2023
4:00 p.m. EST

Columbus Crew	2–1	Los Angeles FC
Hernández 33' (pen.); Yeboah 37'	Report	Bouanga 74'

Lower.com Field, Columbus, Ohio
Attendance: 20,802
Referee: Armando Villarreal

Columbus Crew	Los Angeles FC

GK	28	(United States) Patrick Schulte
DF	18	(Denmark) Malte Amundsen	(yellow card) 61'
DF	4	(France) Rudy Camacho
DF	31	(Cape Verde) Steven Moreira
MF	14	(Ghana) Yaw Yeboah		(substituted off) 83'
MF	8	(United States) Aidan Morris	(yellow card) 90+3'
MF	6	(United States) Darlington Nagbe (c)		(substituted off) 84'
MF	23	(Canada) Mohamed Farsi		(substituted off) 86'
MF	10	(Uruguay) Diego Rossi	(yellow card) 90'	(substituted off) 90+1'
FW	20	(Romania) Alexandru Mățan
FW	9	(Colombia) Cucho Hernández		(substituted off) 85'
Substitutes:
GK	24	(United States) Evan Bush
DF	94	(Colombia) Jimmy Medranda
DF	21	(Ukraine) Yevhen Cheberko		(substituted on) 83'
MF	25	(United States) Sean Zawadzki		(substituted on) 84'
MF	7	(United States) Julian Gressel		(substituted on) 85'
FW	19	(Canada) Jacen Russell-Rowe
FW	27	(United States) Maximilian Arfsten
FW	17	(United States) Christian Ramirez		(substituted on) 86'
FW	13	(Trinidad and Tobago) Kevin Molino		(substituted on) 90+1'
Manager:
(France) Wilfried Nancy

GK	16	(Canada) Maxime Crépeau
DF	12	(Ecuador) Diego Palacios	(yellow card) 85'	(substituted off) 87'
DF	14	(Italy) Giorgio Chiellini
DF	3	(Colombia) Jesús David Murillo
DF	24	(United States) Ryan Hollingshead
MF	23	(United States) Kellyn Acosta		(substituted off) 76'
MF	6	(Spain) Ilie Sánchez	(yellow card) 67'	(substituted off) 87'
MF	11	(United States) Timothy Tillman	(yellow card) 53'	(substituted off) 60'
FW	99	(Gabon) Denis Bouanga
FW	10	(Mexico) Carlos Vela (c)	(yellow card) 49'
FW	25	(Uruguay) Cristian Olivera
Substitutes:
GK	77	(United States) John McCarthy
DF	2	(Honduras) Denil Maldonado
DF	33	(United States) Aaron Long
DF	30	(Spain) Sergi Palencia		(substituted on) 87'
MF	50	(Bulgaria) Filip Krastev		(substituted on) 76'
MF	19	(Poland) Mateusz Bogusz		(substituted on) 60'
FW	9	(Spain) Mario González		(substituted on) 87'
FW	27	(Mexico) Nathan Ordaz
FW	7	(Croatia) Stipe Biuk
Manager:
(United States) Steve Cherundolo

MLS Cup MVP: Cucho Hernández (Columbus Crew)

Assistant referees:
Cameron Blanchard
Ian McKay
Fourth official:
Jon Freemon
Reserve assistant referee:
Jeremy Kieso
Video assistant referee:
Kevin Stott
Assistant video assistant referee:
TJ Zablocki

Match rules

- 90 minutes of regulation time
- 30 minutes of extra time if necessary
- Penalty shootout if scores still level
- Maximum of nine named substitutes
- Maximum of five substitutions. Each team was only given three opportunities to make substitutions, excluding substitutions made at half-time, before the start of extra time, and at half-time in extra time. Two additional substitutions were available for concussed players.

== Post-match ==
Columbus became the third team to win at least three MLS Cup titles, after D.C. United and the LA Galaxy. Cucho Hernández was named the MLS Cup MVP for his performance, a first for a Colombian player. The team's 82 goals in the regular season and playoffs were the most to be scored by an MLS Cup-winning side. Wilfried Nancy became the first Black coach to win the MLS Cup and commented that he was "proud" but "not happy at the same time" due to the lack of fellow Black coaches in the league. Patrick Schulte and Sean Zawadzki became the first players to play in both an MLS Cup and MLS Next Pro Cup final; 22-year-old Schulte was also the youngest goalkeeper to win a title. Darlington Nagbe became the tenth player in league history to win four editions of the MLS Cup.

Bouanga's goal in the second half was his 38th of the season, tying an MLS record set by teammate Carlos Vela for most goals in a single year across all competitions. LAFC ended a 353-minute shutout streak by conceding the penalty kick to Columbus.

On December 12, the Crew held a victory parade on Nationwide Boulevard and a rally at a plaza outside Lower.com Field to celebrate their MLS Cup title. The parade featured an oversized replica of the Philip F. Anschutz Trophy that was too large to fit under a bridge near the stadium. The Crew visited the White House and met with President Joe Biden and Second Gentleman Doug Emhoff on September 27, 2024, to celebrate their championship. Columbus had already qualified for the 2024 CONCACAF Champions Cup and their original berth was transferred to the New England Revolution, who finished sixth in the regular season standings.

The two teams met again in the 2024 Leagues Cup final, which Columbus hosted and won 3–1.
