= Columbus Crew =

American professional soccer club based in Columbus, Ohio

- Full name: Columbus Crew
- Nicknames: The Crew; The Black and Gold
- Founded: June 15, 1994; 32 years ago
- Stadium: ScottsMiracle-Gro Field; Columbus, Ohio
- Capacity: 20,371
- Coordinates: 39°58′6.46″N 83°1′1.52″W
- Owners: Dee and Jimmy Haslam; JW and Whitney Johnson; Pete Edwards
- General Manager: Issa Tall
- Head coach: Laurent Courtois (interim)
- League: Major League Soccer
- 2026: Eastern Conference: 7th Overall: 12th Playoffs: TBD
- Website: columbuscrew.com
Home colors	Away colors	Third colors

The Columbus Crew are an American professional soccer club based in Columbus, Ohio. The club competes in Major League Soccer (MLS) as a member of the Eastern Conference. The team began play in 1996 as one of the 10 charter clubs of the league. The Crew are currently operated by an ownership group led by the Haslam family (also owners of the Cleveland Browns and Pilot Corporation) and former team physician Pete Edwards. The Haslam/Edwards group is the third ownership group in club history.

The franchise was founded in 1994. Its stadium is ScottsMiracle-Gro Field, opened in 2021. From 1999 to 2021, the Crew played home games at Historic Crew Stadium (formerly Mapfre Stadium and Columbus Crew Stadium), the first soccer-specific stadium built for an MLS team, with a seating capacity of 19,968 as of the 2015 season. From 1996 to 1998, the Crew played its home games at Ohio Stadium on the campus of Ohio State University. In 2023, the team set club attendance records for both most cumulative attendance and most sellouts.

The Crew have won eight major trophies: the MLS Cup in 2008, 2020 and 2023; the Supporters' Shield in 2004, 2008, and 2009; the 2002 U.S. Open Cup; and the Leagues Cup in 2024. The Crew have qualified for the CONCACAF Champions Cup (or its predecessor, the CONCACAF Champions League) six times, reaching the quarter-finals on five occasions. In 2021, the club won their first continental trophy by winning the Campeones Cup, and in 2024, the Crew advanced to their first Champions' Cup final.

== History ==
=== The beginning (1994–1998) ===
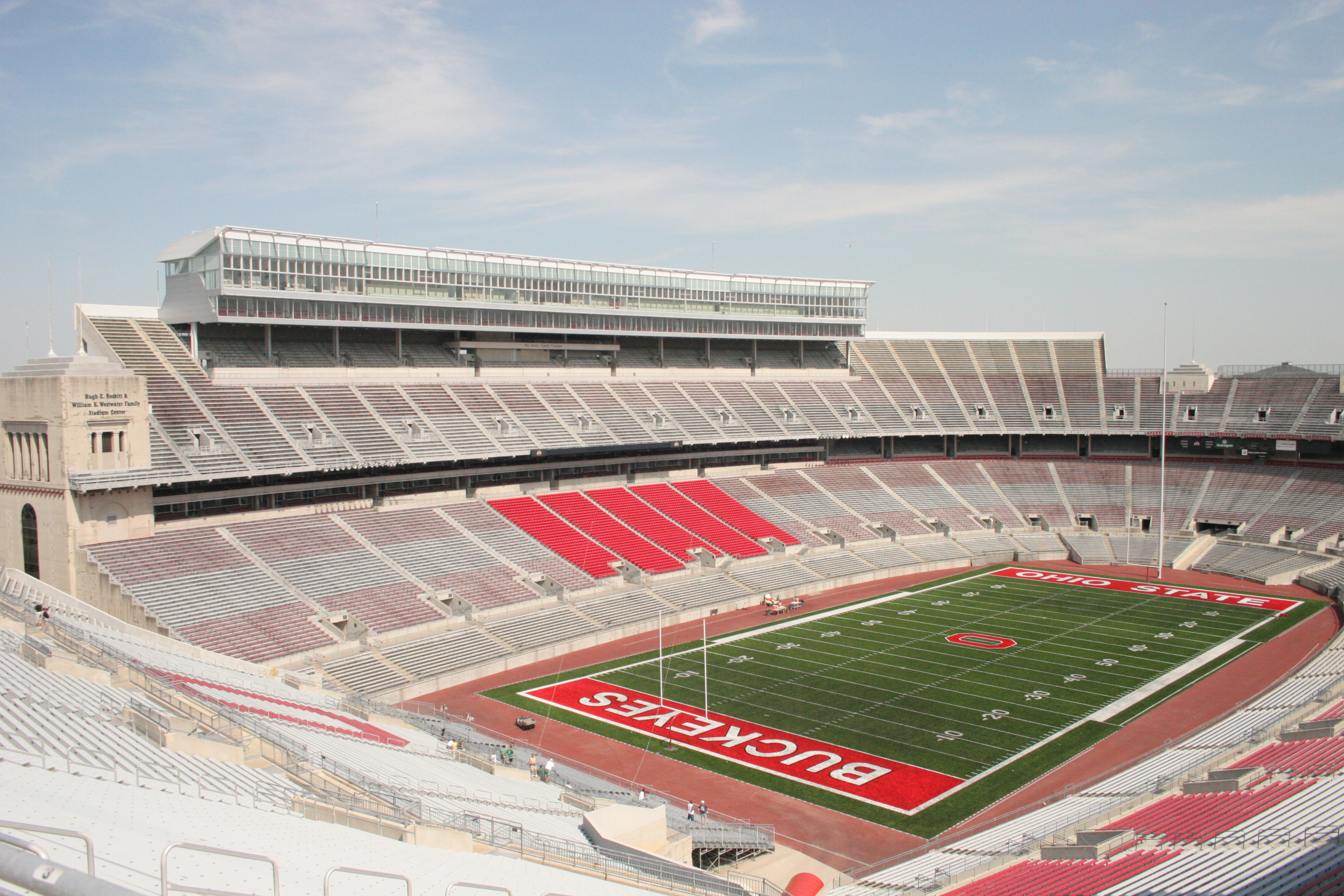
The Crew played their first game on April 13, 1996, at Ohio Stadium.

On June 15, 1994, Major League Soccer announced that Columbus, Ohio, would be home to one of the ten founding members of the new top flight North American professional soccer league. Columbus had promised construction of a soccer-specific stadium and had sold over 12,000 season ticket deposits. The team was tentatively named the Columbus Eclipse in its application to the league, as a solar eclipse had passed over the city after reaching the league's 10,000-deposit minimum. Prior to the initial MLS season, a public contest was created to decide the name for the team. The name "the Crew", was picked out of 2,500 entrants and 650 nickname suggestions. The winning individual linked it to the city's namesake of Christopher Columbus, his voyages, and the crew that accompanied him on his discoveries. By the time the team had begun creating imagery and logos for the team, it was quickly realized that the connection to the explorer would likely prove to be controversial. Thus, the franchise then chose to instead emphasize another type of crew while keeping the moniker, with the team's first crest featuring three shadowed men in hard hats representing the construction workers and Midwestern work ethic.

MLS investor Lamar Hunt, and his son Clark became the owners of both the Columbus Crew and Kansas City Wizards in 1996. The first players for the Crew were South African national team veteran Doctor Khumalo, by assignment, and Brian McBride. McBride was selected as the first overall pick in MLS's first draft in 1996. Former U.S. National Team coach Timo Liekoski would be the team's head coach for its first season.

The Crew played their first game on April 13, 1996, in front of a home crowd of 25,266 in Ohio Stadium against D.C. United and won 4–0. Columbus would struggle, however, winning only 5 of their next 21 games. After the 6–16 start, Tom Fitzgerald replaced head coach Liekoski. The Crew, under Fitzgerald, won 9 of their last 10 games to finish fourth in the Eastern Conference. They went on to lose in the conference playoff semi-finals.

The Black & Gold finished 15–17 in both 1997 and 1998, which put them in third and fourth place, respectively, in the Eastern Conference. Each season ended with losses in the Conference Finals to D.C. United. In 1998, the Crew reached the U.S. Open Cup Final. However, the match was postponed due to a hurricane and was controversially relocated from Virginia Beach to Soldier Field in Chicago, the home of the Chicago Fire. The Fire would go on to win the match 2–1 after extra time. Stern John, in his first of two seasons with Columbus, was the 1998 scoring champion, amassing 26 goals and 5 assists.

=== A new home (1999–2003) ===
Columbus's 1999 season began with the opening of Columbus Crew Stadium, the first soccer-specific stadium in the United States. Columbus won their first game in the stadium, 2–0, against New England Revolution in front of a sell-out crowd of 24,741. Columbus would finish in second place at 19–13, but would lose in the conference finals to D.C. United for the third straight season. The 1999 season was the last for Stern John who scored 52 goals in 65 games for the club. The team had the lowest goals against average in the Eastern Conference, and Mark Dougherty became the first goalkeeper in league history to record 50 wins, with a 4–2 win over the MetroStars on August 18, 1999, at Giants Stadium.

The Crew hosted the 2000 MLS All-Star Game, with Mike Clark, Brian McBride, and Dante Washington representing Columbus in the game. The aforementioned Dante Washington was acquired from the Dallas Burn to replace Stern John, but his 13 goals in 2000 was not enough to propel the Crew to the playoffs. For the first time, Columbus failed to reach the postseason. Columbus got off to a slow 1–3–2 start in 2001, which led to the replacement of coach Tom Fitzgerald. Fitzgerald, who had coached 161 of the Crew's first 183 MLS matches over parts of six seasons between 1996 and 2001, was replaced by Greg Andrulis. Andrulis would lead the Black & Gold to a 2nd-place finish in 2001 but the team was ousted from the playoffs in the league quarterfinals.

In 2002, Columbus would win the U.S. Open Cup for the first time in team history. They advanced to the finals by beating the Richmond Kickers, MetroStars, and Kansas City Wizards. In the final, they beat LA Galaxy, who had just won the MLS Cup earlier in the week. Freddy García scored the only goal and keeper Jon Busch posted the shutout in Columbus's 1–0 win. It was the first championship in team history. The Crew finished 11–12–5 in the regular season and finished in a tie for first place. They lost in the league semi-finals to New England. Kyle Martino won rookie of the year in 2002, a first for the Crew. By winning the 2002 U.S. Open Cup, Columbus received a bid to play in the 2003 CONCACAF Champions' Cup. They advanced to the second round by beating Árabe Unido 4–2 on aggregate in the first round before losing to Monarcas Morelia, 6–2. McBride would play his final season with Columbus in 2003 before joining Fulham of the Premier League.

=== Transitions (2004–2006) ===
With the departure of Brian McBride, Columbus added Robin Fraser and Simon Elliott to the club. These additions proved to be vital as Fraser went on to win the Defender of the Year award in 2004. The Crew won the Supporters' Shield set a franchise record for points, 49, by going 12–5–13, thanks in part to an 18-game unbeaten streak (8–0–10) to end the season. Despite winning the Supporters' Shield for best record in the league, the club would be eliminated from the MLS Cup in the Eastern Conference semi-finals. In his last season for the Black & Gold, Jeff Cunningham scored his 62nd goal, which tied him with McBride for the franchise record.

Over both of the next two seasons, Columbus battled injuries to several players and struggled to win many games. Despite winning the MLS Coach of the Year Award in 2004, Andrulis was replaced on an interim basis by Robert Warzycha midway through the 2005 season. After missing the playoffs in the 2005 season, the club would hire former L.A. Galaxy and UCLA head coach Sigi Schmid. Schmid had won an MLS Cup and U.S. Open Championship in his six seasons with Galaxy. Warzycha remained on staff under Schmid. In 2006, the Crew went on a 13-game winless streak (0–7–6) between June 10 and August 19. The season ended on a tragic note when team founder and owner Lamar Hunt died on December 14, 2006.

Around this time, Columbus Crew supporters began using the term "Massive" to describe the club and city, at first ironically, but then as a term of pride and endearment of the club that continuously fought the odds.

=== The Barros Schelotto era (2007–2010) ===
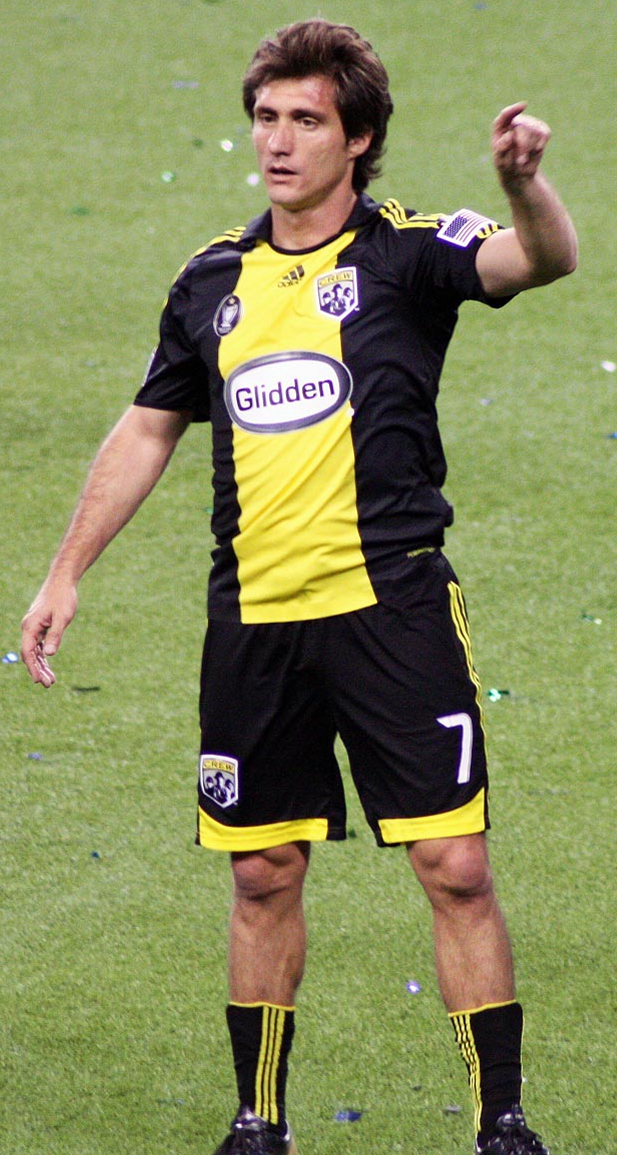
The Crew signed Guillermo Barros Schelotto in 2007, who helped them reach their first MLS Cup the next year.

The 2007 season in Major League Soccer started with the introduction of the Designated Player Rule, leading to the global icon David Beckham signing with the LA Galaxy. The Crew followed suit by signing Guillermo Barros Schelotto on April 19, 2007, although he was not signed under the new Designated Player Rule. Columbus also signed forward Alejandro Moreno to bolster its attack. Even with these new players, the Crew still missed the playoffs in 2007.

In 2008, the Crew won its first Eastern Conference title, and subsequently, its first MLS Cup. Led by Barros Schelotto, who scored seven goals and had 19 assists and won the MLS Most Valuable Player Award, the team also won its second Supporters' Shield. After going 17–7–6 in the regular season, the Black & Gold won playoff games against Kansas City and Chicago Fire before beating the New York Red Bulls 3–1 in the final. Chad Marshall won MLS Defender of the Year award, and Sigi Schmid won Coach of the Year.

After the 2008 season, Sigi Schmid declined a contract offer from Columbus and became coach of Seattle Sounders FC. The Crew's ownership believed that Schmid had been in contact with the Sounders despite being denied permission to talk to other teams during the season. It was also alleged that he shared confidential information with Seattle after his contract with the Crew had ended. Major League Soccer ruled that no tampering had occurred, but ordered Seattle to financially compensate the Crew. Columbus would then name former player and assistant coach Robert Warzycha head coach. In 2009, Barros Schelotto was rewarded with the honor of becoming the franchise's first Designated Player. The club went 13–7–10 in the regular season, good enough for 49 points and their second consecutive Supporters' Shield. The Crew were eliminated by Real Salt Lake in the two-legged Eastern Conference semi-finals, 4–2 on aggregate. Chad Marshall won his second consecutive MLS Defender of the Year award.

Columbus started the 2010 season in the CONCACAF Champions League. They reached the quarterfinals but lost to Toluca in March. The club finished the season 14–8–8 but lost in the quarterfinals of the MLS Cup playoffs to the Colorado Rapids. The Crew lost 2–1 in the 2010 U.S. Open Cup Final at Qwest Field, home of the Seattle Sounders.

=== Rebuilding and Warzycha's final years (2011–2013) ===
In May 2011, the Crew signed its first ever homegrown player, Aaron Horton. on June 28, a 10-man Columbus lost at home in the third round of the U.S. Open Cup to the Richmond Kickers of USL Pro, the first time in Columbus history that they were eliminated by a third division club. Columbus finished the regular season ninth in the league at 13–13–8, and lost in the wild card round of the playoffs to the Colorado Rapids. That loss marked the third consecutive season they were unable to advance past this stage.

The midst of the 2012 season was most notable for a tragedy that happened off the field, as rookie midfielder Kirk Urso died from arrhythmogenic right ventricular cardiomyopathy, an inherited heart disease caused by genetic defects of the parts of heart muscle. The Crew "soft retired" his number, 15, as it has not been assigned to another player since, either on the senior team, or Crew II.

On the field, the club lost in the third round of the U.S. Open Cup to the Dayton Dutch Lions in USL Pro, and finished sixth in the Eastern Conference with 52 points and a 15–12–7 record. They would narrowly miss the playoffs.

=== The Precourt era (2013–2018) ===
On July 30, 2013, Anthony Precourt became the second investor-operator in the history of the club and made sweeping changes to the front office and sporting staff. He parted ways with head coach Robert Warzycha in September 2013 and hired Gregg Berhalter in November as head coach and the club's first-ever sporting director. Club president Mark McCullers stepped down in March 2014 after being told his contract would not be extended, and the vacancy was filled by Andy Loughane in August 2014. The Precourt ownership upgraded portions of the stadium, adding a larger video board and upgrading sections of seats, while also changing the logo and name of the club, going from "Columbus Crew" to "Columbus Crew SC". The Crew had two of its players, center back Giancarlo González and left back Waylon Francis, participate in the 2014 FIFA World Cup, representing Costa Rica. González was praised for his performance, earning a spot on ESPN's Best XI of the group stage. He was subsequently transferred out of Columbus for a $5 million fee.

The beginning of the 2015 season started in late 2014 with the return of Kei Kamara. Kamara proved to be beneficial as he scored 22 regular season goals and 4 playoff goals. Along with Kamara, Ethan Finlay and Waylon Francis received spots in the 2015 MLS All-Star Game. At the end of the 2015 regular season, the club set its all-time attendance record and sellout record for a single season at Crew Stadium, with the largest crowd coming on September 26 with an announced attendance of 22,719. Columbus appeared in their second-ever MLS Cup Final in 2015, losing at home to the Portland Timbers 2–1.

The 1,000th goal in club history was scored on August 12, 2017, by Justin Meram.

==== Proposed relocation to Austin ====
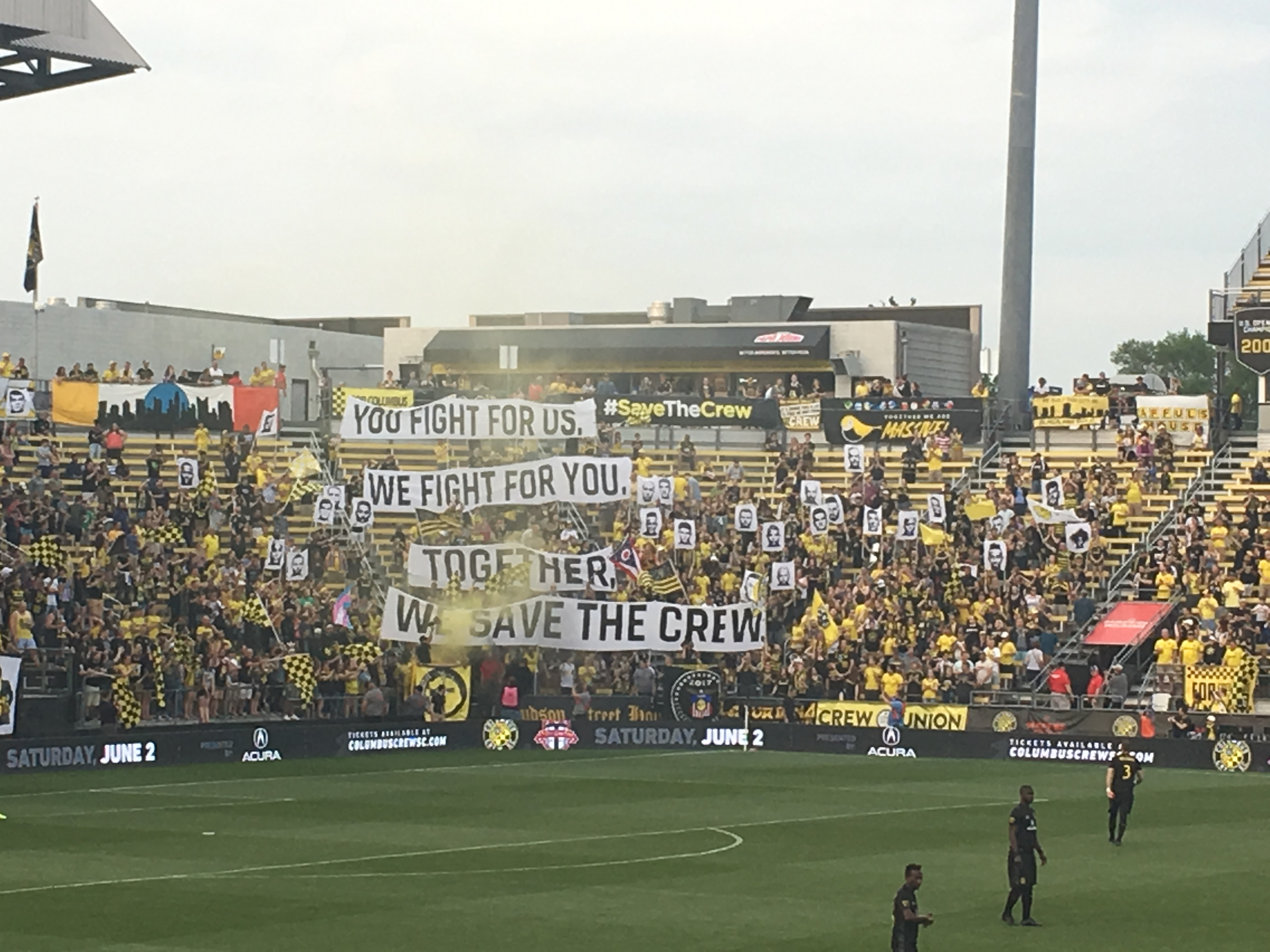
A "Save the Crew" tifo before a game against the Chicago Fire in 2018

On October 17, 2017, Precourt announced intentions to relocate the franchise to Austin, Texas, if a downtown stadium could not be secured in Columbus. Following the news, fans and supporters of the club began a campaign and movement known as #SaveTheCrew. Many had been present in the city's council building on behalf of the cause. Later in the month, it was revealed that Precourt had a clause in his purchase of the club that would allow him to relocate the franchise, but only to Austin.

On November 15, 2017, Precourt and MLS commissioner Don Garber met with Columbus mayor Andrew Ginther and civic and business leaders about the Crew's future in Columbus. After the meeting, both sides issued press releases detailing the meeting. Per the delegation from Columbus, Precourt and MLS refused to take the relocation threat off the table. Per Precourt and MLS, Columbus leaders did not present any plan for a downtown stadium. On the issue, the mayor stated it was "obvious that Don Garber nor PSV (Precourt Sports Ventures) had any commitment for the team to stay in Columbus".

In the annual state of the league conference, commissioner Garber addressed more on the potential move. He had stated the difficulties there has been present with the market over the years. Discussing in 2008, when the league began its initiative to end having ownership groups owning multiple franchises in the league, there was no success in finding a local ownership group in the market of Columbus, with an interested group wanting to purchase the team but with a very low value. It was then when the league's executives hired a different company banker and expanded its search regionally where Anthony Precourt was involved. Garber stated that had Precourt not acquired the club, there was a possibility that Columbus would have ceased operations and ultimately folded. As to why the issues were not stated publicly, Don Garber stated that the league is a "private business" and what's been happening has been seen in other major sport leagues in the country.

On March 5, 2018, Ohio attorney general Mike DeWine and Columbus city attorney Zach Klein filed a lawsuit against Precourt, citing a previously untested 1996 state law (the Modell Law) that prevents sports teams that benefited from public facilities or financial assistance from relocating to another city without a six-month notice and attempting to sell the team to a local ownership group. The bill was originally passed after the controversial relocation of the Cleveland Browns to Baltimore.

=== Haslam era and two MLS Cups (2018–present) ===
On October 12, 2018, the owner of the Cleveland Browns, Jimmy Haslam, released a statement stating he was in the process of buying the Crew, along with other local groups. MLS later released a statement stating their willingness to keep the Crew in Columbus, and that Precourt will get the rights to start a team in Austin if the deal goes through. The sale of the Crew to Haslam's ownership group was announced on December 28, 2018, and was completed the following month. As part of the deal, the lawsuit against Precourt was dismissed that day; the Modell Law remains untested as a result.

On January 1, 2019, control of the Crew franchise was officially transferred to the Haslam family and longtime team physician Dr. Pete Edwards, who took full ownership of the club after reaching a deal with Precourt Sports Ventures LLC. The new ownership group also quickly announced that they would be building a new stadium for the Crew in the Arena District of downtown Columbus.

The team then hired Tim Bezbatchenko as president from Toronto FC and Caleb Porter, previously with the Portland Timbers, as their new coach for the 2019 season, with previous head coach Gregg Berhalter having left to take the USMNT head coaching job. The 2019 season was a forgettable one as the Crew dealt with a myriad of injuries throughout the season, including a season ending ACL injury to Federico Higuaín.

Before the start of the 2020 MLS season, the Crew made two major signings, bringing in new designated player Lucas Zelarayán and midfielder Darlington Nagbe. The team started out the season well, winning their group in the MLS is Back Tournament before going out in the round of 16 and finishing in third place in the Eastern conference and fourth place overall. After making a run in the playoffs, the Crew won their second MLS Cup just two years into the Haslam era, defeating the Seattle Sounders 3–0 at Mapfre Stadium on December 12, 2020, in MLS Cup 2020.

Weeks into the 2021 season, the franchise announced they would now be known as Columbus SC, using "Columbus Crew" and "The Crew" in informal instances. The rebrand received strongly negative reception from supporters of the team. A statement by the Nordecke claimed that "neither the Nordecke nor any Crew Supporters Group was involved at any time with the conception, development, or design of the rebrand. The Board was only shown the rebrand in the last few days, and it was presented to us as a completed product with no chance for input." The logo was further criticized as generic and harming the team's identity. This was done despite promises of fan involvement by team president Tim Bezbatchenko, which led to him being labeled as a "traitor". A petition was created on change.org to restore the team's name. Other observers noted that the rebrand was part of a similar trend in MLS teams to emulate European naming conventions, and was compared to the rebranding of Chicago Fire FC two years earlier. On May 17, 2021, in response to the backlash surrounding the rebrand, the franchise announced that "Columbus Crew" would remain as their official name and that the new logo would be modified accordingly. In addition, the "SC" was dropped from the brand, with the team's name being simply the "Columbus Crew" once again.

They recorded their first win at ScottsMiracle-Gro Field on July 17, 2021.

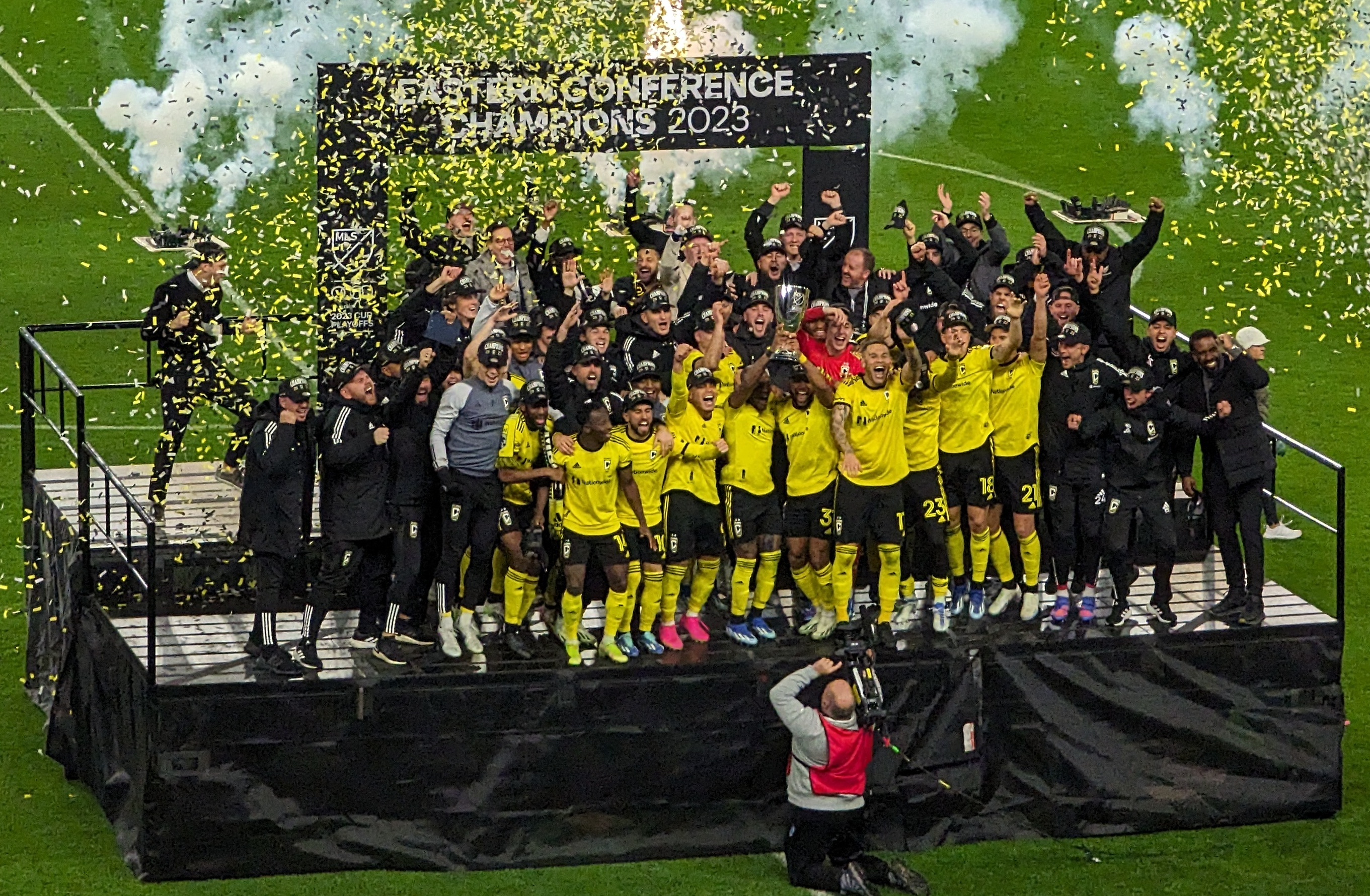
Crew players celebrate winning the Eastern Conference final in the 2023 MLS Cup Playoffs.

Columbus fired Porter after the team failed to qualify for the 2022 MLS Cup Playoffs. In December 2022, they hired Wilfried Nancy from CF Montréal as Porter's replacement. In Nancy's first season, Columbus advanced through the playoffs, beating Atlanta United FC, Orlando City SC, and FC Cincinnati in a playoff edition of the Hell Is Real derby to reach MLS Cup 2023, played on December 9 at Lower.com Field. The Crew defeated holders Los Angeles FC by 2–1 to capture the third MLS Cup title in the club's history.

The Columbus Crew played against Tigres UANL in the quarter-finals of the 2024 CONCACAF Champions Cup. The first leg took place at Lower.com Field and ended in a 1–1 draw. In the second leg in Mexico, Columbus advanced to the semi-finals after defeating Tigres 4–3 in a penalty shoot-out, with Tigres fans applauding the Crew players as they walked off the pitch. This result marked the first time in CONCACAF Champions Cup history that an MLS team did not win the first leg at home against a Mexican side and still went on to advance. The Crew then defeated Monterrey in both legs of the semifinal, including a "remarkable" 3–1 victory away to once again make history, this time as the first MLS team to win in Mexico in the tournament's history.

Columbus faced C.F. Pachuca in the final of the 2024 Champions Cup Tournament. This edition introduced a single-game final, replacing the previous home-and-away two-leg series. Pachuca, with a superior record in the tournament, hosted the match at Estadio Hidalgo which is situated at an altitude of 8,000 feet above sea level. The Crew lost 3–0 to Pachuca, with the high altitude and Pachuca's strong performance cited as significant factors in the outcome. It was later revealed that several Columbus players were affected by an illness, with the team doctor suspecting food poisoning. Both the players and the head coach made similar insinuations.

== Colors and badge ==
First logo (1996–2014)

Second logo (2014–2021)

Third logo (2021–present)

The official colors of the Crew are black and gold. Columbus's usual primary jersey is predominately bright yellow with black trim and has been nicknamed the "banana kit" or "canary kit" by fans. From 1996 until 1999, the Crew donned black as their primary uniform color, as the league required teams to have a dark uniform and a white uniform. in 2000, the Crew unveiled their first fully yellow jersey, but Columbus had to wait until 2004 to wear the yellow consistently at home, as league rules stated that a club could only wear their "light" jerseys four times at home.

The alternate uniform has historically been black. For the 2012 season, Columbus began shifting more towards a white uniform with yellow and black trim or stripes. Even so, the away uniforms are seldom worn by the Crew due to the strong favor shown to the traditional home uniform; and also due to the fact that the historically black jerseys compound the summer heat in the United States climate. For the 2015 season, the Crew returned to a black jersey for its alternate uniform. During the beginning of the 2016 season, Columbus maintained a black kit, and also unveiled a white kit with yellow, red, and periwinkle trim introduced as being inspired by the city of Columbus flag.

The club badge from 1996 to 2014 was unique amongst MLS teams in that it featured people, containing three silhouetted males wearing construction hats beneath a stylized "Crew" wordmark. The logo was intended to represent a crew of hard-working people, much like the hard-working, blue collar image the city of Columbus cultivates.

Citing a disconnect between what the crest stood for and the 21st-century identity of the city of Columbus, owner Anthony Precourt initiated a rebrand upon assuming ownership in 2013. Precourt said that Columbus was no longer a true blue collar town, and that the industrial/manufacturing motif was no longer representative. In fact, Columbus had grown into a 21st-century city and become much more "dynamic and diverse". This also entailed changing the meaning of the club's nickname, going from the original reference to a construction crew to a "tight-knit group of people who come together to share a passion for our club and the sport of soccer".

On October 8, 2014, the Crew unveiled a new badge. The new circular-shaped badge features the club's classic black and gold colors, a minimized original crest with "96" overlaid on top, and the black and gold checkerboard pattern predominantly seen on flags waving in the Nordecke. A great deal of symbolism was packed into the new badge. The horizontal stripes are representative of the ten original MLS franchises, and the shield is an homage to the club's original badge with the 96 representing 1996 – the club's first year in competition. The inset "O" in the badge mimics the same shape found in Ohio state flag, a nod to Columbus's role as the state's capital city. Finally, as a significant point of pride for the city of Columbus, "Columbus" was added to the new badge, along with "SC" to further define the brand more accurately as a soccer club.

With new ownership came a rebranding, and a new logo and name change was introduced in 2021, much to the dismay of supporters. On the new logo, the state of Ohio flag forms the overall shape of the shield, while a "C" that represents the Crew primarily, as well as the city Columbus dawns the interior of the badge, and a "96" in the bottom right corner that represents when the club began play as the first club in Major League Soccer.

As part of the rebrand, the club identified three brand pillars: original, energetic, and authentically Columbus. These pillars aim to celebrate the club's history as a team of firsts — the first club in Major League Soccer, the first soccer-specific stadium in the league, and the first major professional championship for Columbus — as well as its youthful, passionate energy and Columbus's young, progressive culture.

Uniform history

1996	1996–97	1997–98	1998–99	1999	2000–01	2000–01	2002–03	2002–03

2004–05	2004–05	2006–07	2006–07	2008–09	2008–09	2010–11	2010–11	2012–13

2012–14	2014	2015	2015–17	2016	2017–18	2018–19	2019–20	2020–21

2021–22	2022–23	2023–24	2024–25	2025–26	2026–27

== Stadium ==
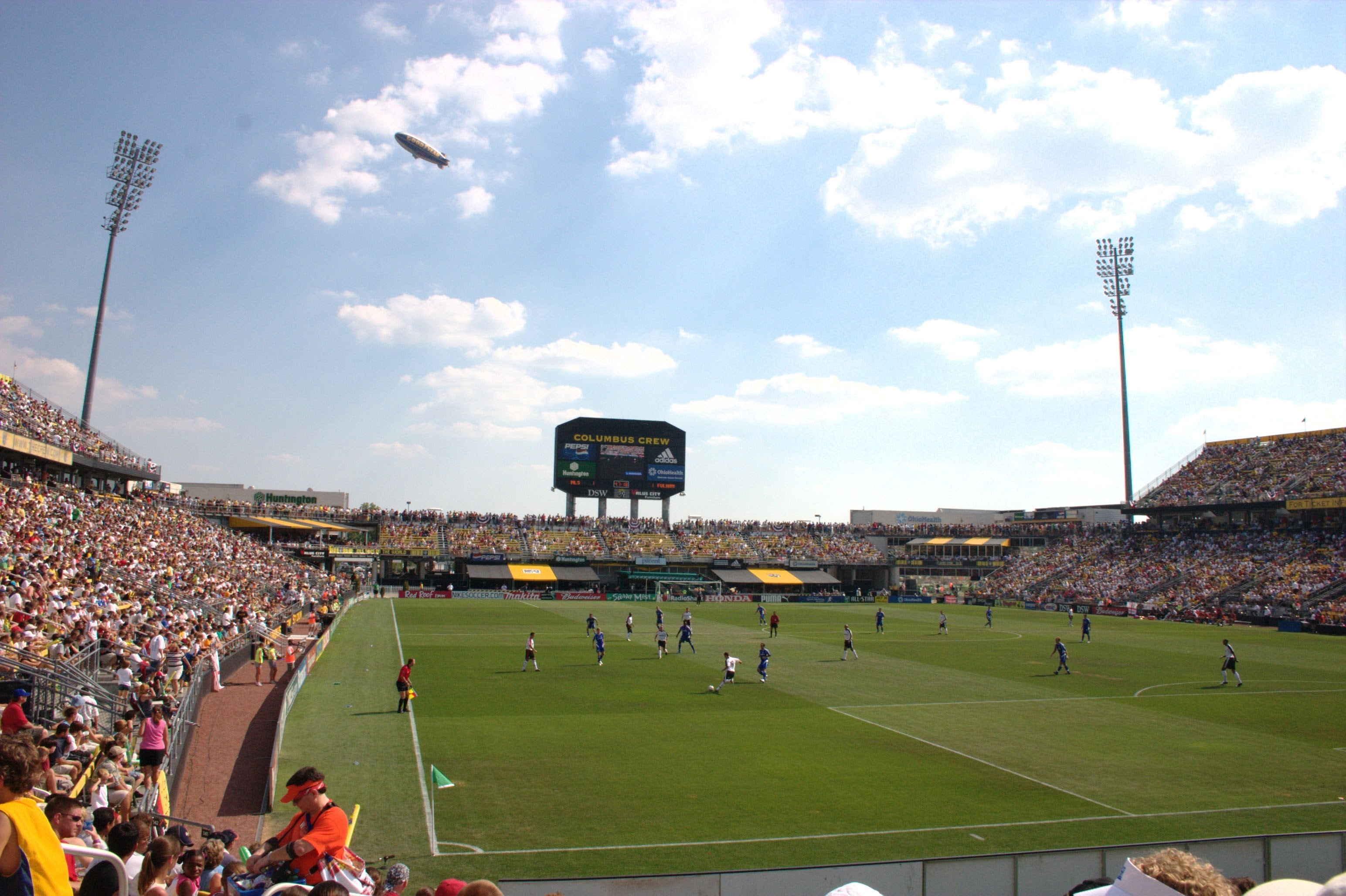
Historic Crew Stadium, the Crew's home from 1999 to 2021, is MLS' first soccer-specific stadium.

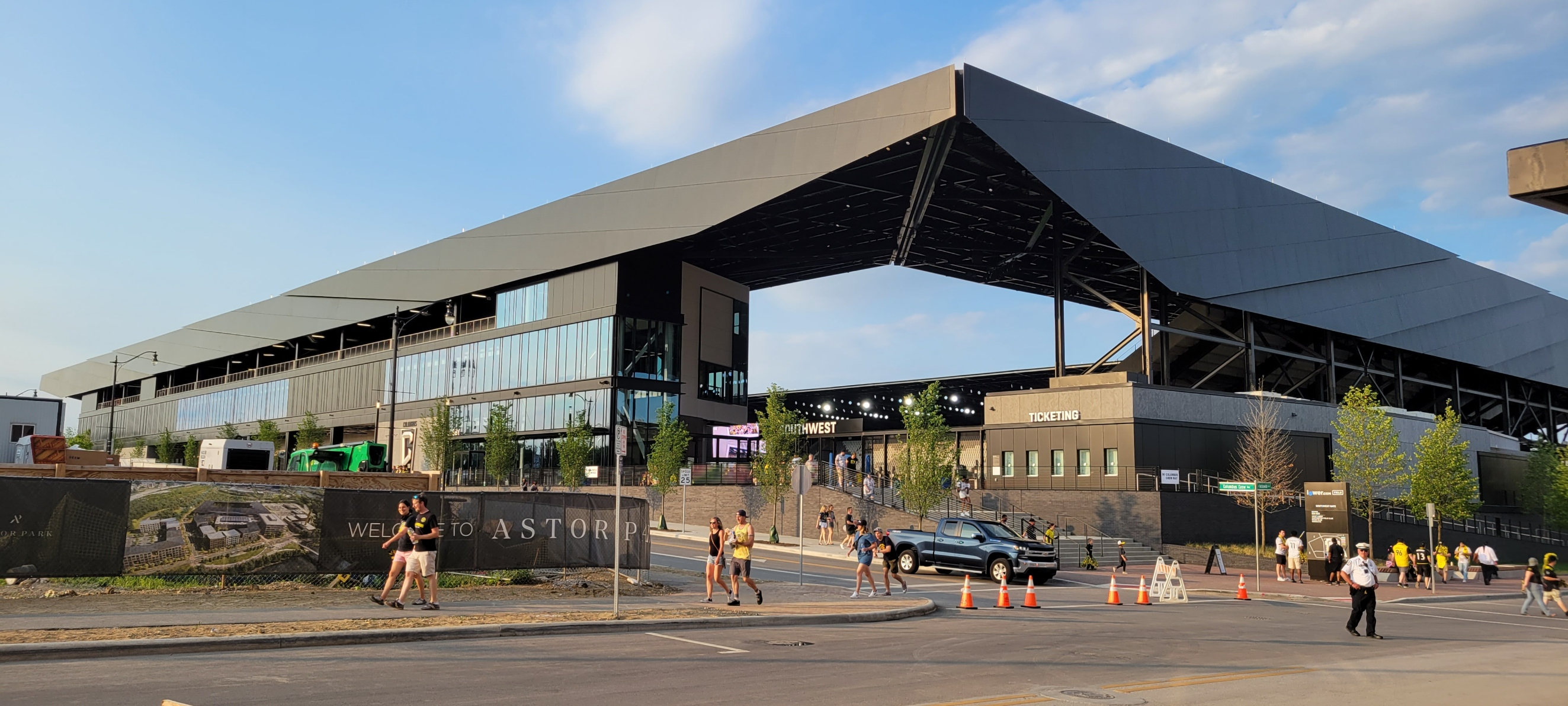
ScottsMiracle-Gro Field, the current home of the Crew.

On May 15, 1999, the Crew opened Columbus Crew Stadium, the first soccer-specific stadium in Major League Soccer, as the Crew beat the New England Revolution 2–0 before a sold-out crowd of 24,741. It had been the model stadium for the rest of the league, and one of the stadiums used by the United States national team in World Cup qualifying. In 2015, the naming rights for the stadium were purchased by Madrid-based insurance company Mapfre.

Previously, the Columbus Crew played their home games at the 102,000-capacity Ohio Stadium on the campus of the Ohio State University, home of the Ohio State Buckeyes college football team. They ended with a 33–20 record while playing there.

The team has also played U.S. Open Cup games at two other stadiums: two games in 2005 and 2016 at the Jesse Owens Memorial Stadium, also owned by the Ohio State University and home of the OSU soccer teams; and one in 2014 at the FirstEnergy Stadium–Cub Cadet Field on the campus of the University of Akron in Akron, Ohio.

As part of the new ownership proposal for the Crew unveiled in 2018, the club announced plans to build a new stadium in the Arena District of Downtown Columbus. The new stadium would cost $230 million and be located at the center of the Confluence Village neighborhood, a mixed-use development with residential and commercial buildings. It would seat 20,000 spectators and include 30 suites and 1,900 club seats. In 2020, a new authority took ownership of MAPFRE Stadium, soon renamed Historic Crew Stadium, and its adjacent city sports park, with the team continuing to control that venue in terms of its use as a training facility. The training facility, the OhioHealth Performance Center, opened in June 2021. The new stadium had its groundbreaking ceremony in 2019 and was completed in mid-2021. On June 15, 2021, the new stadium was named Lower.com Field via a sponsorship deal with Columbus-based online real estate company Lower.com, and the Crew's first game there was on July 3 against the New England Revolution. On November 25, 2025, the Crew announced the naming rights of the stadium had been purchased by the Scotts Miracle-Gro Company, and renamed to ScottsMiracle-Gro Field.

In 2025, the Crew moved their April 19, regular season match against Inter Miami CF to Huntington Bank Field in Cleveland—150 miles (240 km) north of Columbus. The stadium is used by the Cleveland Browns, who share ownership with the team, and has 40,000 more seats than Lower.com Field. The match was moved due to anticipated demand due to Miami's stars, including Lionel Messi, and drew a club-record attendance of 60,614 spectators. The move was criticized by fans for alienating the Columbus fanbase; supporters' group Nordecke announced that they would not provide capos or other equipment at the match.

== Revenue and profitability ==
After losing money in 2011, the Crew set three financial goals in 2012 with the aim of achieving financial stability. First, the team wanted a jersey sponsor, having been absent one in 2011. Second, the team wanted to sell naming rights to Columbus Crew Stadium, hoping for $15 million over 10 years. Third, it aimed to increase season-ticket sales from its current levels (later revealed to be 4,000) to 10,000. While the club was able to gain a jersey sponsor when they reached a deal with Barbasol in 2012, it remained "a ways off from the other two goals" in March 2014.

Under Precourt Sports Ventures, Anthony Precourt, and Andy Loughnane, the Crew's goals had shifted from exclusively focusing on season ticket sales to selling out MAPFRE Stadium. In 2014, the club set all-time stadium attendance records for highest overall attendance and most sellouts in one season. Loughnane confirmed that the club was trending to increase its season ticket membership by 1,000 members per year and also stated his intent for the club to assimilate into the corporate community and fan culture, adding that he believes this transformation is happening rapidly. On March 3, 2015, the Crew announced that they had agreed to a multimillion-dollar stadium naming rights partnership with MAPFRE Insurance, a first for the stadium. In 2015, the Crew and EAS Sports Nutrition agreed to a naming rights deal for its training facilities. Merchandise sales grew double digits since the previous year, as did food and beverage sales. It was also announced that the club gained over 1,000 new season ticket members from the previous year.

=== Sponsorship ===
The team's first shirt sponsor was Mars' Snickers chocolate bar, which signed a five-year deal worth $6 million that lasted from 1996 to 2000. After the deal ended, Columbus played without a shirt sponsor during the 2001 season. Pepsi then became the team's sponsor from 2002 to 2004. Following a three-year gap with no sponsor, Glidden was announced as the new sponsor, with a three-year deal worth $1 million per year, from 2008 to 2010. In 2012, the Crew announced a new shirt sponsorship deal with Barbasol, a shaving cream brand based in Dublin, Ohio. The deal was worth $900,000 annually, and ran for five years. This was followed by a three-year deal with Acura, which was announced in February 2017 and was the largest annual commercial transaction in the club's history, with a reported value of $1.8 million per year. On February 27, 2020, the Columbus Crew announced a multi-year deal with Nationwide, a Columbus-based insurance company. While the exact terms of the deal were not disclosed, the annual value was reported to be more than $3 million.

Period	Kit manufacturer	Shirt sponsor	Sleeve sponsor	Shorts sponsor
1996–2000	Adidas	Snickers		
2002–2004	Adidas	Pepsi		—
2008–2010	Adidas	Glidden	—	—
2012	Adidas	Barbasol	U.S. Soccer Development Academy	—
2013–2016	Adidas	Barbasol	—	—
2017–2019	Adidas	Acura	—	—
2020	Adidas	Nationwide Children's Hospital	Scotts	OhioHealth
2021	Adidas	Nationwide Insurance	—	—
2022–2024	Adidas	Nationwide Insurance	Tipico	—
2025–present	Adidas	Nationwide Insurance	DHL Supply Chain	—

There was no jersey sponsor in 2001, 2005–2007 and 2011.

== Club culture ==
=== Supporters and Nordecke ===
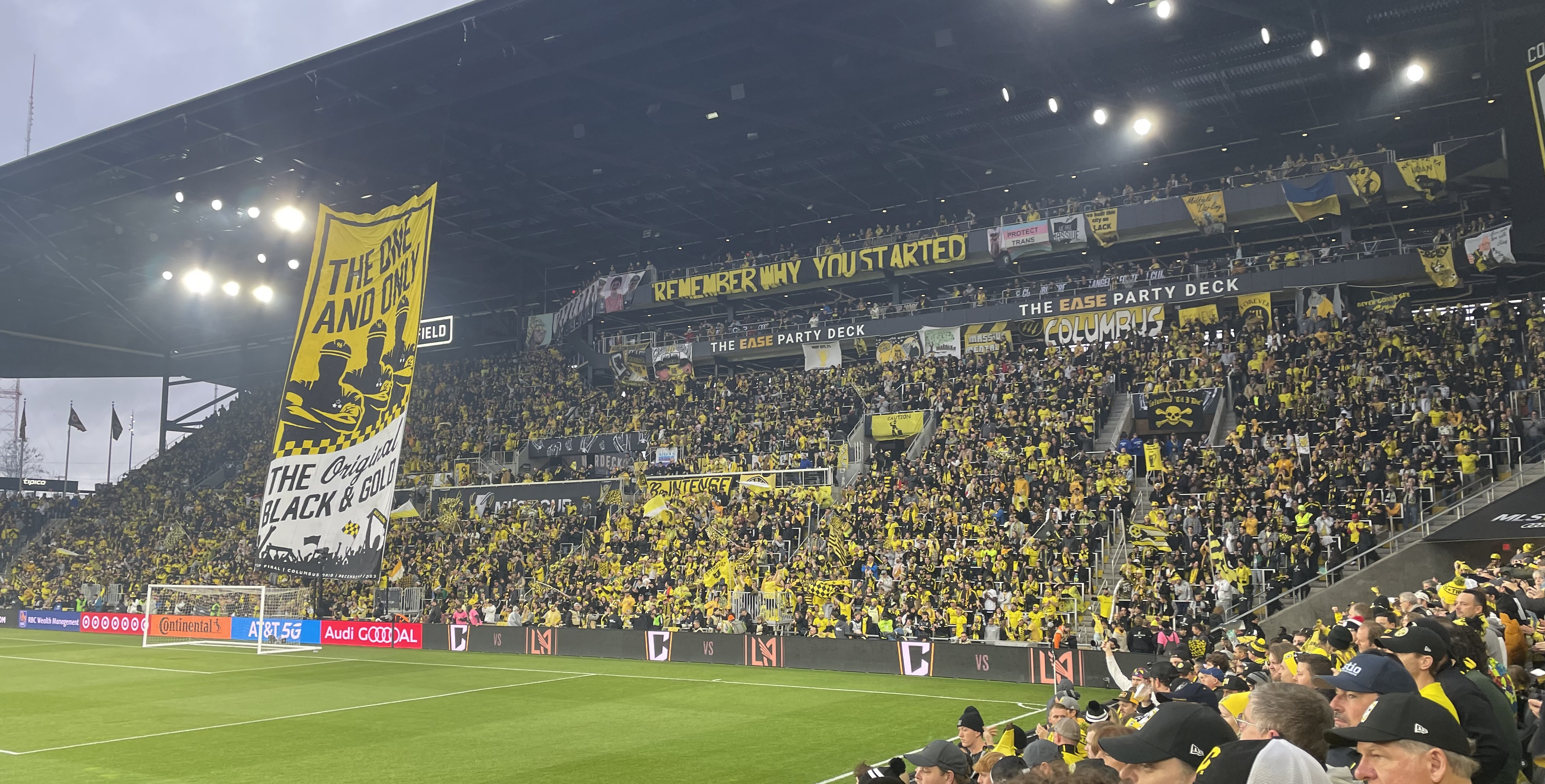
The Nordecke, the Columbus Crew's supporter section, displaying a tifo before MLS Cup 2023 at ScottsMiracle-Gro Field.

Before the 2008 season, the Columbus Crew front office demolished the north stands where the most ardent of Crew supporters stood, in an attempt to catch up to other teams which had chosen in intervening years to design their soccer-specific stadiums with a stage at that end of the stadium to provide additional revenue by facilitating concerts and other events. Prior to this, the team's three supporters' groups (Crew Supporters Union, Hudson Street Hooligans, and La Turbina Amarilla) sat apart because of differences between the groups ranging from age to ethnicity. The building of the stage forced the groups to come together into the north corner of the stadium, forming one large block of vocal supporters. The three groups formed the Nordecke ( /nɔːrdˈɛkə/), which is German for "north corner", celebrating the city's German heritage. In 2006 a large contingency of fans from the Nordecke began traveling together to support the Crew during their away campaigns. In late 2009/early 2010, the term "NorOnTour" grew popular on social networking, to describe the frequent fan traveling support.

=== Mascot ===
Columbus Crew's first mascot was "Crew Cat", who was the franchise's mascot for almost 20 years. Columbus's official mascot is "S.C.", the son of "Crew Cat" that was introduced for the 2015 MLS season. As new ownership was employed in the 2019 season, the older "Crew Cat" returned and attends games alongside S.C.

=== Rivalries ===
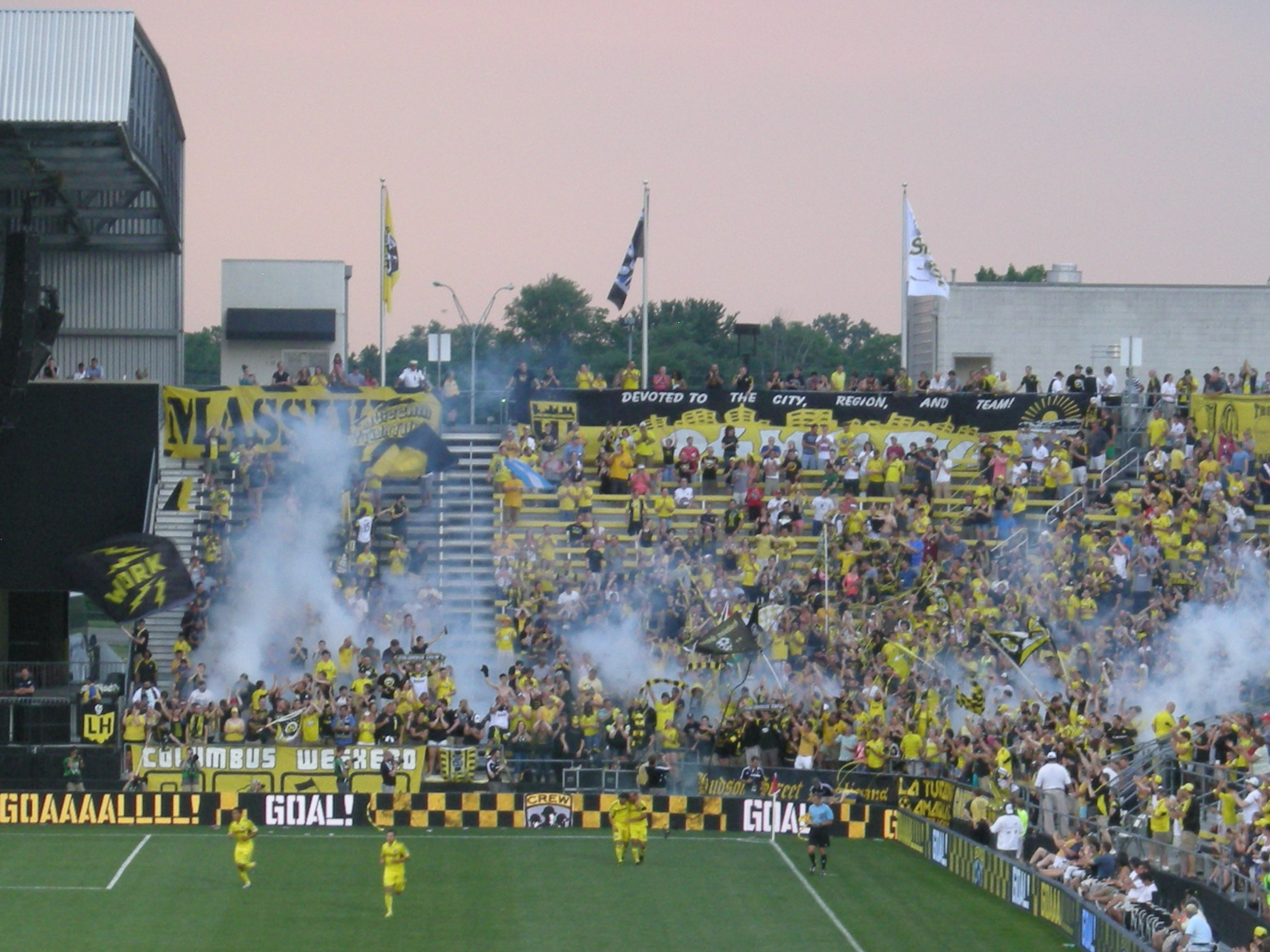
The Nordecke celebrating after Columbus scored a goal against the Chicago Fire in 2013 at Crew Stadium, now Historic Crew Stadium

The Crew has a rivalry with the Chicago Fire. Columbus is roughly a six-hour drive away from Chicago. Due to the relatively close proximity of the two cities, it is not uncommon for supporters of both teams to make the trip to support their club in matches between the two. In the 2008 season, Columbus defeated Chicago in the Eastern Conference Championship match. In 1998, Chicago defeated Columbus for the Lamar Hunt U.S. Open Cup.

The Crew also plays for two rivalry cups during the regular season. One of the series is with Toronto FC for the Trillium Cup, due to the close proximity of the cities. The Crew also contests FC Dallas for the Lamar Hunt Pioneer Cup. This trophy was created due to Lamar Hunt being the owner of both teams until his death.

As a lower-division club, FC Cincinnati supporters claimed the Crew as a rival, although some Columbus supporters initially did not consider the former USL team a rival. The two sides first met in a 2017 Lamar Hunt U.S. Open Cup match in front of 30,000 spectators, the largest non-final crowd for an Open Cup fixture. The match ended in a 1–0 win for FC Cincinnati. As Cincinnati moved to the league, the rivalry became solidified in league lore; this derby is known as the Hell is Real Derby, based on a Christian billboard along I-71 between Columbus and Cincinnati.

== Players and staff ==
=== Current roster ===
As of October 14, 2026

Note: Flags indicate national team as defined under FIFA eligibility rules; some limited exceptions apply. Players may hold more than one non-FIFA nationality.

No.	Pos.	Nation	Player
1	GK	GUA	Nicholas Hagen
2	DF	ARG	Andrés Herrera
3	DF	CIV	Eric Bailly
4	DF	FRA	Rudy Camacho
7	MF	FRA	Dylan Chambost
8	FW	URU	Santiago Rodríguez (DP)
9	FW	PLE	Wessam Abou Ali (DP)
10	MF	ESP	Brais Méndez (DP)
11	DF	USA	Brooks Lennon
12	DF	USA	Cesar Ruvalcaba
14	MF	USA	Amar Sejdić
16	FW	USA	Taha Habroune (HG)
17	MF	GUI	Sekou Bangoura
18	DF	DEN	Malte Amundsen
19	FW	SEN	Jamal Thiaré
20	MF	POR	André Gomes

No.	Pos.	Nation	Player
21	MF	MAR	Anass Zaroury (on loan from Panathinaikos)
22	MF	USA	Tristan Brown (HG)
23	DF	ALG	Mohamed Farsi
24	GK	USA	Evan Bush
25	DF	USA	Sean Zawadzki (captain; HG)
26	MF	ARG	Lautaro Giaccone (on loan from Argentinos Juniors)
28	GK	USA	Patrick Schulte
31	DF	CPV	Steven Moreira
33	FW	CHI	Gonzalo Tapia (on loan from São Paulo)
39	FW	CIV	Kevin Gbamblé
41	GK	BLR	Stanislav Lapkes (HG)
46	FW	USA	Chase Adams (HG)
50	MF	USA	Tarun Karumanchi
54	GK	USA	Luke Pruter
77	FW	VEN	Josef Martínez

=== Out on loan ===
Note: Flags indicate national team as defined under FIFA eligibility rules; some limited exceptions apply. Players may hold more than one non-FIFA nationality.

No.	Pos.	Nation	Player
30	MF	FRA	Hugo Picard (on loan to Troyes)
45	DF	USA	Owen Presthus (HG; on loan to Nashville SC)
47	DF	USA	Quinton Elliot (HG; on loan to Monterey Bay FC)

No.	Pos.	Nation	Player
48	MF	USA	Zach Zengue (on loan to St. Louis City)
90	FW	AZE	Nariman Akhundzada (on loan to Erzurumspor)

=== Team management ===
Front office
Investor-operators	Dee and Jimmy Haslam; JW and Whitney Johnson; Dr. Pete Edwards
General Manager	Issa Tall
President of Business Operations	Mary Shepro
Coaching staff
Interim head coach	Laurent Courtois
Assistant coach	Shannon Murray
Assistant coach	Josh Williams
Goalkeeping coach	Phil Boerger
Head of video & data analysis	Marc O'Neill
Technical director	Marc Nicholls
Crew 2 and Crew Academy
Director of Player Development	Dan Lock
Crew 2 Head coach	Federico Higuaín
Academy Head coaches	U18: Chris Rogers; U16: Shahad Farahani; U15: Eddie Hertsenberg

Last updated: 02:15, April 22, 2026 (EDT)

=== Head coach history ===
The Crew have had nine different head coaches since joining the league in 1996. Timo Liekoski, the only Finnish head coach in MLS history, was the first head coach in 1996, but started 6–16 and was fired midseason to be replaced by Tom Fitzgerald. Sigi Schmid managed the team for three seasons (2006–08). Robert Warzycha was the head coach twice, the first time on an interim basis prior to Schmid's arrival and then immediately after Schmid left until September 2, 2013, when he was fired and Brian Bliss became the interim coach. On November 16, 2013, it was announced that Gregg Berhalter would become the head coach as well as the first sporting director in club history. After Berhalter left to take over as coach of the United States men's national soccer team, Columbus hired Caleb Porter, who had previously been the head coach of the Portland Timbers in MLS and the Akron Zips men's soccer team in the NCAA. Due to results of the 2021 and 2022 seasons, Columbus fired Porter and would go on to hire Wilfried Nancy as head coach.

Fitzgerald and Warzycha are tied for the all-time leader in regular season wins (70).

Name	Nationality	Tenure
Timo Liekoski	Finland	December 5, 1995 – August 2, 1996
Tom Fitzgerald	United States	August 2, 1996 – May 17, 2001
Greg Andrulis	United States	May 17, 2001 – July 16, 2005
Robert Warzycha (interim)	Poland	July 16, 2005 – October 20, 2005
Sigi Schmid	Germany	October 20, 2005 – December 16, 2008
Robert Warzycha	Poland	December 23, 2008 – September 2, 2013
Brian Bliss (interim)	United States	September 2, 2013 – November 6, 2013
Gregg Berhalter	United States	November 6, 2013 – December 2, 2018
Caleb Porter	United States	January 4, 2019 – October 10, 2022
Wilfried Nancy	France	December 6, 2022 – December 4, 2025
Henrik Rydström	Sweden	December 31, 2025 – May 17, 2026
Laurent Courtois (interim)	France	May 17, 2026 – present

=== General manager and sporting director history ===
Name	Nationality	Tenure
Jamey Rootes	United States	1995–2000
Jim Smith	United States	2000–2004
Mark McCullers	United States	2004–2013
Gregg Berhalter	United States	2013–2018
Tim Bezbatchenko	United States	2019–2024
Issa Tall	France	2024–present

== Player development ==
=== Columbus Crew 2 ===
On June 21, 2021, Major League Soccer announced the formation of a new professional league, which would act as a developmental program for its clubs. The new league, which was unveiled on December 6, 2021, would be named MLS Next Pro and the Crew's team would be Columbus Crew 2. The league and club compete at the Division III level. With the exception of special occasions such as championship matches, all home games take place at Historic Crew Stadium. Fans regularly refer to Columbus Crew 2 by their unofficial nickname, the Capybaras.

=== Academy ===
The Columbus Crew Academy fields three non-professional teams, the U15, U16, U18 teams, as well as the pre-academy with four age groups divided into two levels, U11/U12 and U13/U14. The Crew have signed 20 academy players to first-team contracts, with notable alumni including Wil Trapp, Aidan Morris, Sean Zawadzki and Taha Habroune. Alumnus Wil Trapp was the first player in MLS history to be a homegrown captain.

In 2021, the Columbus Crew launched The Crew Network, which aims to promote soccer in Ohio and offer exclusive opportunities to boys, girls, coaches, and parents. Crew Network clubs receive various benefits, including technical and commercial support from the Crew, exposure for their brand, access to the Crew's coaching staff, and a direct pathway to the Columbus Crew Academy for high-potential players. Currently, there are 24 Crew Network clubs operating across Ohio.

== Honors ==
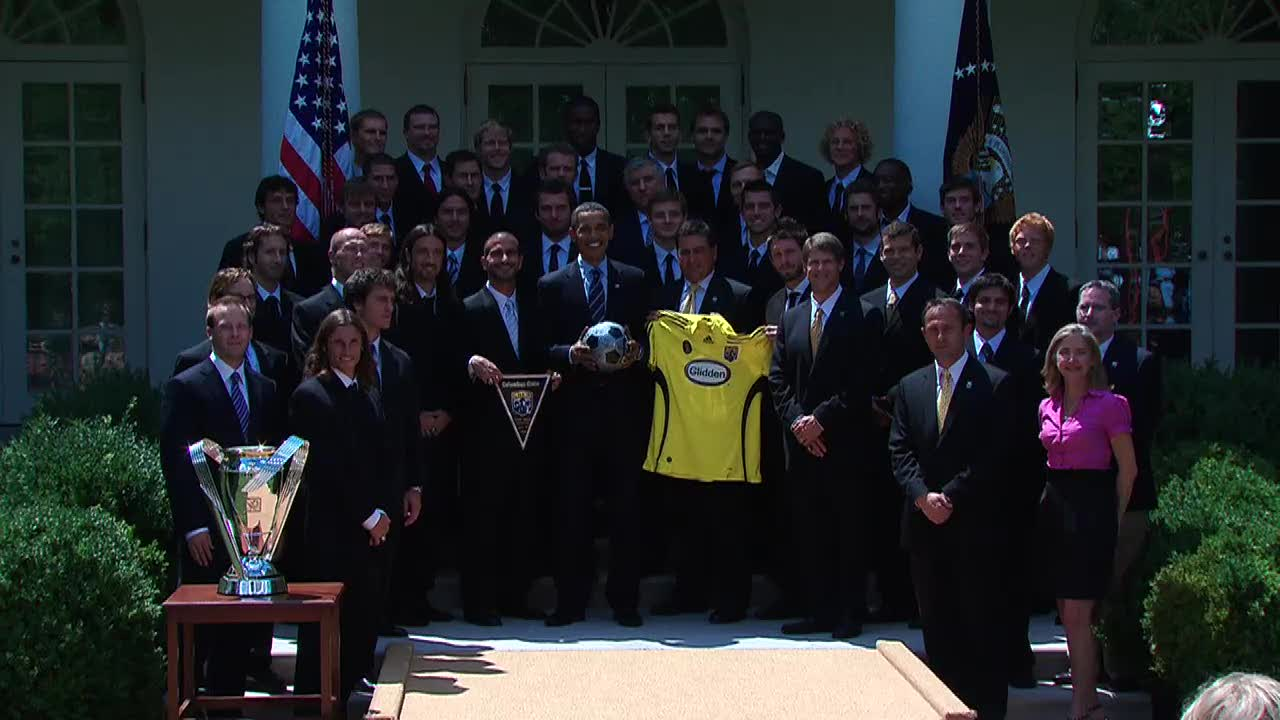
U.S. President Barack Obama welcomes the 2008 MLS Cup Champions the Columbus Crew to the White House on July 13, 2009

Domestic
Competitions	Titles	Seasons
MLS Cup	3	2008, 2020, 2023
Supporters' Shield	3	2004, 2008, 2009
U.S. Open Cup	1	2002
Eastern Conference (Playoff)	4	2008, 2015, 2020, 2023
Eastern Conference (Regular Season)	3	2004, 2008, 2009
International
Competitions	Titles	Seasons
Leagues Cup	1^{s}	2024
Campeones Cup	1	2021

Notes

- record
- ^{s} shared record

=== Awards ===
- CONCACAF Champions Cup Fair Play Award: 2024

== Record ==
=== Year-by-year ===
This is a partial list of the last five seasons completed by the Crew. For the full season-by-season history, see List of Columbus Crew seasons.

Season	League											Position		Playoffs	USOC	Continental / Other		Average attendance	Top goalscorer(s)	
Season	Div	League	Pld	W	L	D	GF	GA	GD	Pts	PPG	Conf.	Overall	Playoffs	USOC	Continental / Other		Average attendance	Name(s)	Goals
2021	1	MLS	34	13	13	8	46	45	+1	47	1.38	9th	17th	DNQ	NH	CONCACAF Champions League Campeones Cup	QF W	18,990	(Armenia) Lucas Zelarayán	13
2022	1	MLS	34	10	8	16	46	41	+5	46	1.35	8th	16th	DNQ	NH	DNQ		19,237	(Armenia) Lucas Zelarayán	10
2023	1	MLS	34	16	9	9	67	46	+21	57	1.68	3rd	3rd	W	Ro16	Leagues Cup	Ro32	20,286	(Colombia) Cucho Hernández	24
2024	1	MLS	34	19	6	9	72	40	+32	66	1.94	2nd	2nd	Ro16	DNE	CONCACAF Champions Cup Leagues Cup Campeones Cup	RU W RU	20,646	(Colombia) Cucho Hernández	25
2025	1	MLS	34	14	8	12	55	51	+5	54	1.59	7th	11th	R1	DNE	CONCACAF Champions Cup Leagues Cup	Ro16 GS	23,663	(Uruguay) Diego Rossi	16

1. Avg. attendance include statistics from league matches only.
2. Top goalscorer(s) includes all goals scored in League, MLS Cup Playoffs, U.S. Open Cup, MLS is Back Tournament, CONCACAF Champions League, FIFA Club World Cup, and other competitive continental matches.

=== International tournaments ===
Columbus Crew in international tournaments
Season	Competition	Round	Opponent	Home	Away	Aggregate
2001	CONCACAF Giants Cup	Quarterfinals	(Costa Rica) Saprissa	1–1	0–2	1–3
2003	CONCACAF Champions' Cup	First round	(Panama) Árabe Unido	3–0	1–2	4–2
2003	CONCACAF Champions' Cup	Quarterfinals	(Mexico) Morelia	2–0	0–6	2–6
2009–10	CONCACAF Champions League	Group C	Puerto Rico Islanders	2–0	1–1	2nd
2009–10	CONCACAF Champions League	Group C	(Mexico) Cruz Azul	0–2	0–5	2nd
2009–10	CONCACAF Champions League	Group C	(Costa Rica) Saprissa	1–1	1–0	2nd
2009–10	CONCACAF Champions League	Quarterfinals	(Mexico) Toluca	2–2	2–3	4–5
2010–11	CONCACAF Champions League	Group B	(Guatemala) Municipal	1–0	1–2	2nd
2010–11	CONCACAF Champions League	Group B	(Mexico) Santos Laguna	1–0	0–1	2nd
2010–11	CONCACAF Champions League	Group B	(Trinidad and Tobago) Joe Public	3–0	4–1	2nd
2010–11	CONCACAF Champions League	Quarterfinals	(United States) Real Salt Lake	0–0	1–4	1–4
2021	CONCACAF Champions League	Round of 16	(Nicaragua) Real Estelí	1–0	4–0	5–0
2021	CONCACAF Champions League	Quarterfinals	(Mexico) Monterrey	2–2	0–3	2–5
2021	Campeones Cup	Final	(Mexico) Cruz Azul	2–0	—N/a	2–0
2023	Leagues Cup	Central 1	(United States) St. Louis City SC	2–1	—N/a	1st
2023	Leagues Cup	Central 1	(Mexico) América	4–1	—N/a	1st
2023	Leagues Cup	Round of 32	(United States) Minnesota United FC	3–3	—N/a	3–3 (3–4 p)
2024	CONCACAF Champions Cup	Round of 16	(United States) Houston Dynamo FC	1–1	1–0	2–1
2024	CONCACAF Champions Cup	Quarterfinals	(Mexico) UANL	1–1	1–1	2–2 (4–3 p)
2024	CONCACAF Champions Cup	Semifinals	(Mexico) Monterrey	2–1	3–1	5–2
2024	CONCACAF Champions Cup	Final	(Mexico) Pachuca	—N/a	0–3	0–3
2024	Leagues Cup	Round of 32	(United States) Sporting Kansas City	4–0	—N/a	4–0
2024	Leagues Cup	Round of 16	(United States) Inter Miami CF	3–2	—N/a	3–2
2024	Leagues Cup	Quarterfinal	(United States) New York City FC	1–1	—N/a	1–1 (4–3 p)
2024	Leagues Cup	Semifinal	(United States) Philadelphia Union	3–1	—N/a	3–1
2024	Leagues Cup	Final	(United States) Los Angeles FC	3–1	—N/a	3–1
2024	Campeones Cup	Final	(Mexico) América	1–1	—N/a	1–1 (4–5 p)
2025	CONCACAF Champions Cup	Round of 16	(United States) Los Angeles FC	2–1	0–3	2–4
2025	Leagues Cup	League stage	(Mexico) Toluca	2–2 (2–4 p)	—N/a	6th
2025	Leagues Cup	League stage	(Mexico) Puebla	3–1	—N/a	6th
2025	Leagues Cup	League stage	(Mexico) León	1–0	—N/a	6th

Columbus holds a 14–6–3 all-time record in international friendlies.

== Player records ==
=== Appearances ===
As of October 31, 2026

Rank	Player	Years	Signed from	MLS	Playoffs	Open Cup	Continental	Total
1	(United States) Chad Marshall	2004–2013	Stanford Cardinal	253	11	8	5	277
2	(United States) Mike Clark	1996–2003	Richmond Kickers	221	22	18	4	265
3	(United States) Jeff Cunningham	1998–2004; 2011	South Florida Bulls; FC Dallas	203	17	17	6	243
4	(United States) Eddie Gaven	2006–2013	MetroStars	209	9	10	13	241
5	(Iraq) Justin Meram	2011–2017; 2018–2019	Michigan Wolverines; Orlando City	206	15	11	2	234
6	(United States) Darlington Nagbe	2020–2025	Atlanta United	175	15	1	25	216
7	(Argentina) Federico Higuaín	2012–2019	Colón	193	14	3	0	210
8	(United States) Brian Maisonneuve	1996–2004	Indiana Hoosiers	172	17	13	6	208
9	(United States) Josh Williams	2010–2014; 2017–2023	Cleveland Internationals; Toronto FC	183	12	4	7	206
10	(United States) Wil Trapp	2013–2019	Akron Zips	185	15	5	0	205

Bold denotes players still playing for the club.

=== Goals ===
As of October 31, 2026

Rank	Player	Years	Signed from	MLS	Playoffs†	Open Cup	Continental	Total
1	(United States) Brian McBride	1996–2003	VfL Wolfsburg	62	9	8	0	79
2	(United States) Jeff Cunningham	1998–2004; 2011	South Florida Bulls; FC Dallas	64	3	6	1	74
3	(United States) Gyasi Zardes	2018–2022	LA Galaxy	54	4	1	2	61
4	(Argentina) Federico Higuaín	2012–2019	Colón	55	4	0	0	59
5	(Colombia) Cucho Hernández	2022–2025	Watford	44	5	0	9	58
6	(Trinidad and Tobago) Stern John	1998–1999	New Orleans Riverboat Gamblers	44	8	3	0	55
7	(United States) Edson Buddle	2001–2005	Long Island Rough Riders	42	2	4	4	52
8	(Uruguay) Diego Rossi	2023–2026	Fenerbahçe	37	2	0	12	51
9	(Iraq) Justin Meram	2011–2017; 2018–2019	Michigan Wolverines; Orlando City	38	3	2	0	43
10	(Armenia) Lucas Zelarayán	2020–2023	UANL	38	2	0	2	42

Bold denotes players still playing for the club.

† Includes MLS is Back Tournament knockout round.

=== Assists ===
As of October 31, 2026

Rank	Player	Years	Signed from	MLS	Playoffs	Open Cup	Continental	Total
1	(Poland) Robert Warzycha	1996–2002	Honvéd	61	5	4	1	71
2	(Argentina) Federico Higuaín	2012–2019	Colón	63	5	1	0	69
3	(United States) Jeff Cunningham	1998–2004; 2011	South Florida Bulls; FC Dallas	44	5	7	0	56
4	(United States) Brian McBride	1996–2003	VfL Wolfsburg	45	3	1	2	51
5	(Argentina) Guillermo Barros Schelotto	2007–2010	Boca Juniors	41	7	0	0	48
6	(United States) Brian Maisonneuve	1996–2004	Indiana Hoosiers	37	3	1	0	41
7	(Colombia) Cucho Hernández	2022-2025	Watford	28	3	0	7	38
8	(Armenia) Lucas Zelarayán	2020–2023	UANL	30	5	0	2	37
9	(Iraq) Justin Meram	2011–2017; 2018–2019	Michigan Wolverines; Orlando City	33	2	1	0	36
10	(Portugal) Pedro Santos	2017–2022	Braga	34	0	1	0	35
10	(United States) Brian West	1998–2003	Virginia Cavaliers	29	2	4	0	35

Bold denotes players still playing for the club.

=== Shutouts ===
As of October 31, 2026

Rank	Player	Years	Signed from	MLS	Playoffs	Open Cup	Continental	Total
1	(United States) William Hesmer	2007–2012	Kansas City Wizards	41	1	0	3	45
2	(United States) **Patrick Schulte**	2022–present	Saint Louis Billikens	28	3	0	2	33
3	(United States) Jon Busch	2002–2006	Hershey Wildcats	25	1	2	1	29
4	(Curaçao) Eloy Room	2019–2023	PSV Eindhoven	25	1	0	2	28
5	(United States) Zack Steffen	2016–2019	SC Freiburg	23	3	0	0	26
6	(United States) Steve Clark	2014–2016	Hønefoss BK	22	1	0	0	23
6	(United States) Andy Gruenebaum	2006–2013	Kentucky Wildcats	18	0	2	3	23
8	(United States) Mark Dougherty	1998–2001	Tampa Bay Mutiny	10	2	2	0	14
9	(United States) Brad Friedel	1996–1997	Galatasaray	11	1	0	0	12
10	(United States) Tom Presthus	2000–2003	D.C. United	9	0	0	1	10

Bold denotes players still playing for the club.

=== Captains ===
Name	Years
(South Africa) Doctor Khumalo	1996
(Argentina) Marcelo Carrera	1997
(United States) Thomas Dooley	1998
(United States) Thomas Dooley (United States) Brian McBride (United States) Mike Lapper	1999
(United States) Mike Lapper	2000
(United States) Mike Clark	2001
(United States) Brian McBride (United States) Brian Maisonneuve (United States) Tom Presthus	2002
(United States) Mike Clark	2003
(United States) Robin Fraser	2004–2006
(United States) Frankie Hejduk	2006–2010
(United States) Chad Marshall	2011–2012
(Argentina) Federico Higuaín	2013
(United States) Michael Parkhurst	2014–2016
(United States) Wil Trapp	2017–2019
(Ghana) Jonathan Mensah	2020–2022
(United States) Darlington Nagbe	2023–2025
(United States) Sean Zawadzki	2026–

== Average attendance ==
Season	Regular season	Playoffs
1996 (Note: All-time highest home attendance: 31,550 on September 15, 1996, at Ohio Stadium.)	18,950	20,807
1997	15,043	11,304
1998	12,275	12,094
1999	17,696	10,983
2000	15,451	missed playoffs
2001	17,551	20,883
2002	17,429	11,624
2003	16,250	missed playoffs
2004	16,872	15,224
2005	12,916	missed playoffs
2006	13,294	missed playoffs
2007	15,230	missed playoffs
2008	14,622	17,613
2009	14,175	10,109
2010	14,642	10,322
2011	12,185	no home games in playoffs
2012	14,397	missed playoffs
2013	16,080	missed playoffs
2014	16,881	9,040
2015	16,985	20,797
2016	17,125	missed playoffs
2017	15,439	17,853
2018	12,447	12,892
2019	14,856	missed playoffs
2020	4,138*	1,500**
2021	16,583	missed playoffs
2022	19,237	missed playoffs
2023	20,314	20,387
2024	20,646	19,050
All-time	15,507	14,264

Key
	Attendance affected by the COVID-19 pandemic
*	Attendance was 17,473 Pre-COVID and 1,471 Post-COVID
**	Attendance was capped at 1,500 due to COVID restrictions
