= Tim Bezbatchenko =

American soccer player and executive

- Born: October 13, 1981 (age 45); Westerville, Ohio
- Occupation: President of Global Soccer at Haslam Sports Group
Association football career
- Height: 5 ft 9 in (1.75 m)
- Position: Midfielder
Youth career
- –2000: Ohio FC
College career
Years	Team	Apps	(Gls)
2000–2003	Richmond Spiders		
Senior career*
Years	Team	Apps	(Gls)
2004–2005	Pittsburgh Riverhounds	31	(1)
- * Club domestic league appearances and goals

Timothy "Tim" Bezbatchenko (born October 13, 1981) is an American retired soccer player and President of Global Soccer at Haslam Sports Group, which owns the Columbus Crew, Columbus NWSL team, and Columbus Crew 2.

== Playing career ==
As a youth player, Bezbatchenko was part of the United States National Pool in 1999–2000 and his club team, Ohio FC, represented the United States at the Nike Global Premier Cup in England in addition to receiving numerous state and national awards and honors. Bezbatchenko played college soccer for the Richmond Spiders of the University of Richmond and was named to the Atlantic 10 Conference All-Academic team in 2003. Bezbatchenko played for the Pittsburgh Riverhounds of the United Soccer Leagues' USL Second Division from 2004 to 2005, scoring one goal in thirty-one league appearances.

== Major League Soccer ==
Following his playing career and graduation from law school, Bezbatchenko spent three years as the Senior Director of Player Relations and Competition with MLS located in New York City. In that role, he was responsible for negotiating and drafting player contracts, as well as finalizing loan and transfer agreements for the import and export of players to and from MLS. In addition, he oversaw all MLS rosters, the MLS player pool, and team salary budgets. He was also responsible for youth and player development initiatives for the league, including the home-grown player signing process. Bezbatchenko also helped the Player Department manage the relationship between the Players Union and interpretation of the league's collective bargaining agreement (CBA). He also served as a liaison with the US Soccer Federation and the Canadian Soccer Association. During the 2013 season, MLS announced a partnership with the French Football Federation (FFF) to create an educational course for MLS Academy Directors that was managed by Bezbatchenko.

== Toronto FC ==
Tim Bezbatchenko was named general manager of Toronto FC on September 20, 2013, after having spent three years at the Major League Soccer (MLS) as Senior Director of Player Relations and Competition. Since joining Toronto FC, Bezbatchenko has been instrumental in making changes to a club who had never made the playoffs in its 7-year history prior to his arrival. His work focused on changes to the roster and creating a new vision for Toronto FC: to be a leader in player development, a leading edge organization in innovative practices and to be internationally recognized as a consistent contender for championships in North America. The changes have led to Toronto FC having its two best seasons in club history, including its first ever MLS playoffs birth.

In 2014, with a number of key acquisitions made through signings and trades, Bezbatchenko was a central figure in acquiring three Designated Players such as England international Jermain Defoe, American international Michael Bradley and Brazilian striker Gilberto. The club finished with the winningest season in club history at the time.

The 2015 season saw Bezbatchenko make additional roster changes to build on the core group of players established in 2014, including the addition of two Designated Players (Italian international Sebastian Giovinco and U.S. international Jozy Altidore). Bezbatchenko also added French midfielder Benoît Cheyrou and MLS talents such as Herculez Gomez, Robbie Findley, Josh Williams, Marky Delgado and Eriq Zavaleta through various trades and MLS drafts. As a result, the club was able to clinch a playoff berth for first time in club history and broke many club records along the way: total points in a season (49), total wins in a season (15), total goals in a season (58), home wins in a season (11), total home goals in a season (34) and recorded four consecutive wins for first time in club history.

The hallmark signing in Bezbatchenko's tenure as general manager has been Sebastian Giovinco. In his first season with Toronto FC and in MLS, Sebastian Giovinco broke multiple MLS and club records. He also captured the 2015 Golden Boot as the league's top goal scorer and became the first player in club history to win the award. He also went on to win the 2015 league MVP.

Bezbatchenko was instrumental in securing a second professional team in the United Soccer League (USL) called Toronto FC II and hired Laurent Guyot from the FFF as Academy Director. Toronto FC II has helped create a clear developmental path from the academy through to the First Team and gives TFC Academy players meaningful professional minutes.

On 4 January 2019, he departed with TFC joining his boyhood club Columbus Crew as president.

== Columbus Crew ==
Bezbatchenko was named the President and General Manager of Columbus Crew on January 4, 2019. He was named in a joint press conference with the new coach, Caleb Porter. This announcement came at a significant time with the team under new ownership after a scuppered move to Austin, Texas by the previous owner.

In only two years with the club, Bezbatchenko oversaw multiple milestones, including a new downtown stadium and training facility, along with a multi-year jersey sponsorship with Nationwide Insurance. He further aided the team in revamping the roster after losing multiple players due to the surrounding uncertainty regarding a move. Bezbatchenko oversaw the launch of Columbus Crew 2, the reserve team for the Crew that debuted in 2022. The club has won two MLS Cups (2020 and 2023) under his watch.

On June 6, 2024, it was announced that Bezbatchenko would be leaving the Crew. He would then move to Black Knight Football Club to take the position as director of the club.

In the Summer of 2026, Bezbatchenko returned to the club after a stint with Black Knight Football Club.
