= Nordecke =

Columbus Crew supporter group

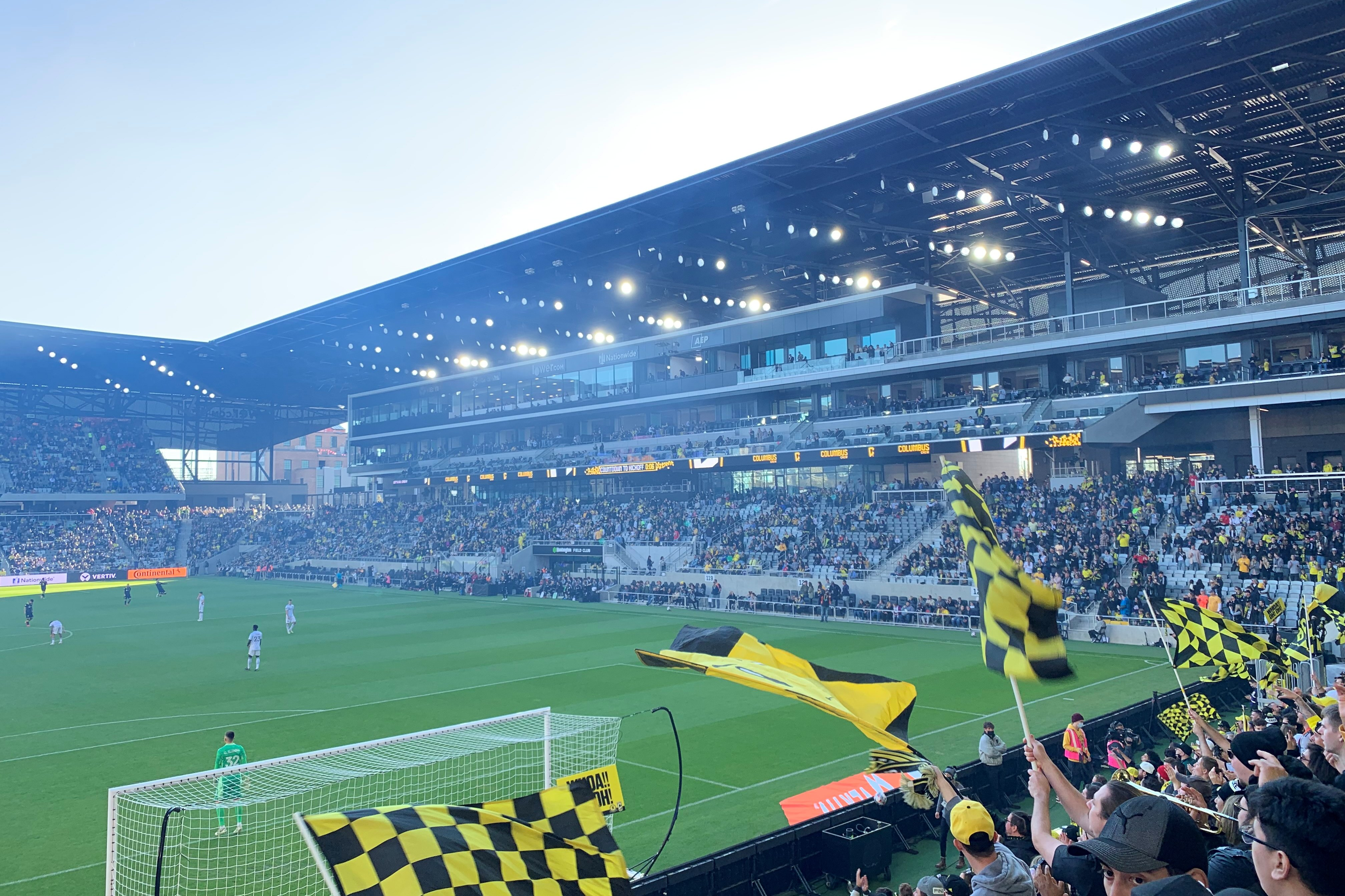
- view of Lower.com Field from the Nordecke.
- Founded: 2007
- Type: Supporters' group
- Clubs: Columbus Crew
- Location: Columbus, Ohio
- Stand: North Stand of ScottsMiracle-Gro Field
- Membership: 1000
- Colors
- Website: https://nordecke.com

The Nordecke (/nɔːrdˈɛkə/); is the independent supporters collective for the Columbus Crew. They are situated in the north stand of ScottsMiracle-Gro Field.

== History ==
Supporter culture of the Crew was fragmented during the first decade of matches at Crew Stadium. Prominent groups included La Turbina Amarilla, Crew Union, and the Hudson Street Hooligans. In 2008, the Hunt Family built a stage into the North Stand of the stadium after the closing of Germain Amphitheater in Polaris. This consolidated the supporter's sections of the stadium into the Northeast Corner. As a result, the supporters clubs that were once fragmented across the section were moved into one - and the Nordecke was founded as a result. Nordecke (meaning north corner in German) is nod to Columbus' German culture coming from immigration to the region. While other supporter's clubs remain active in the city, the Nordecke has become the umbrella club for ultras supporting the Crew.

== Nordecke Nation ==
There is a large network of supporters clubs for the Crew around the United States that are marketed under the broader Nordecke umbrella. Many are scattered across Ohio, but active groups meet as far as California. There are currently as many as thirteen supporters groups in the city of Columbus alone. Those include, but are not limited to:

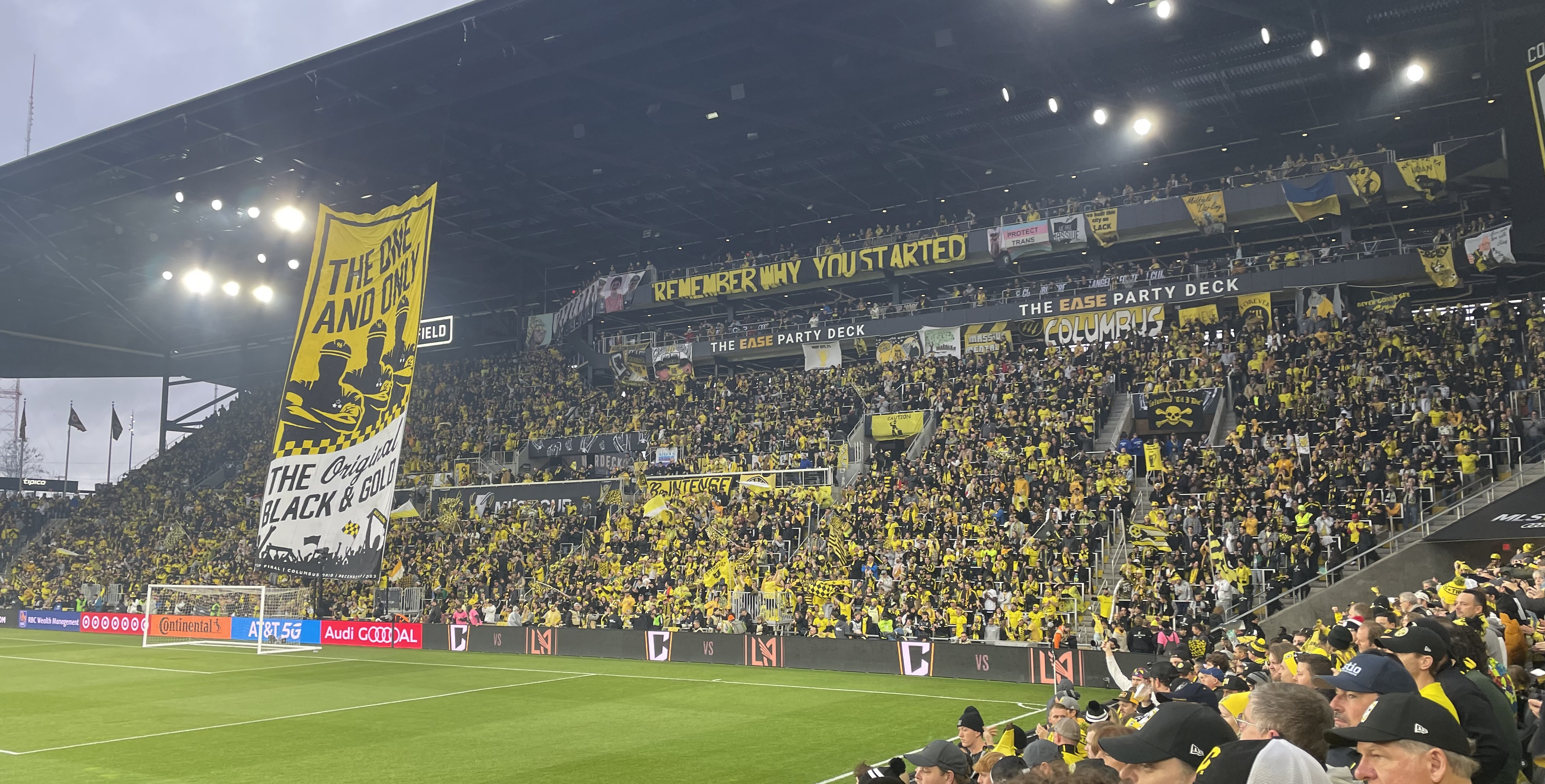
- TIFO display for the 2023 MLS Cup Final.
  Crew Supporters Union
- The Hive
- Murderers' Row
- Queen Anne's Revenge
- Gate 5 Collective
- La Guardia
- La Turbina Amarilla
- Black Flag Social Club
- Hudson Street Hooligans
- Server 96
- Yellow Nation Army
- GCGBAG

There are also clubs in Cleveland, Youngstown, Dayton, and Cincinnati. Clubs outside of Ohio include the Mile High Massive (Denver, Colorado), Crew York (New York City), Mecklenburg Massive (Charlotte, North Carolina), 31Crew (Chicago, Illinois), and the Flordecke (Orlando, Florida). Notably, clubs exist in cities that now host active MLS franchises. Due to the Crew's status as a charter member of Major League Soccer, fans in cities with new franchises often were fans of other charter members, including the Crew, before teams were founded in those regions.

== TIFOSWEAT ==
The Nordecke often displays Tifo during home matches, designed and painted by members of the organization. The collective of supporters, known as TIFOSWEAT, meet throughout the season to organize the work. The organization has displayed tifo featuring Pride, Latino Heritage, and Juneteenth celebrations. Notable displays include the "Respect Your Roots" design that spoke directly on the ongoing Save the Crew movement, Goosebumps inspired designs celebrating Columbus' own R. L. Stine, and player-specific designs for club legends like Justin Meram and Federico Higuaín.

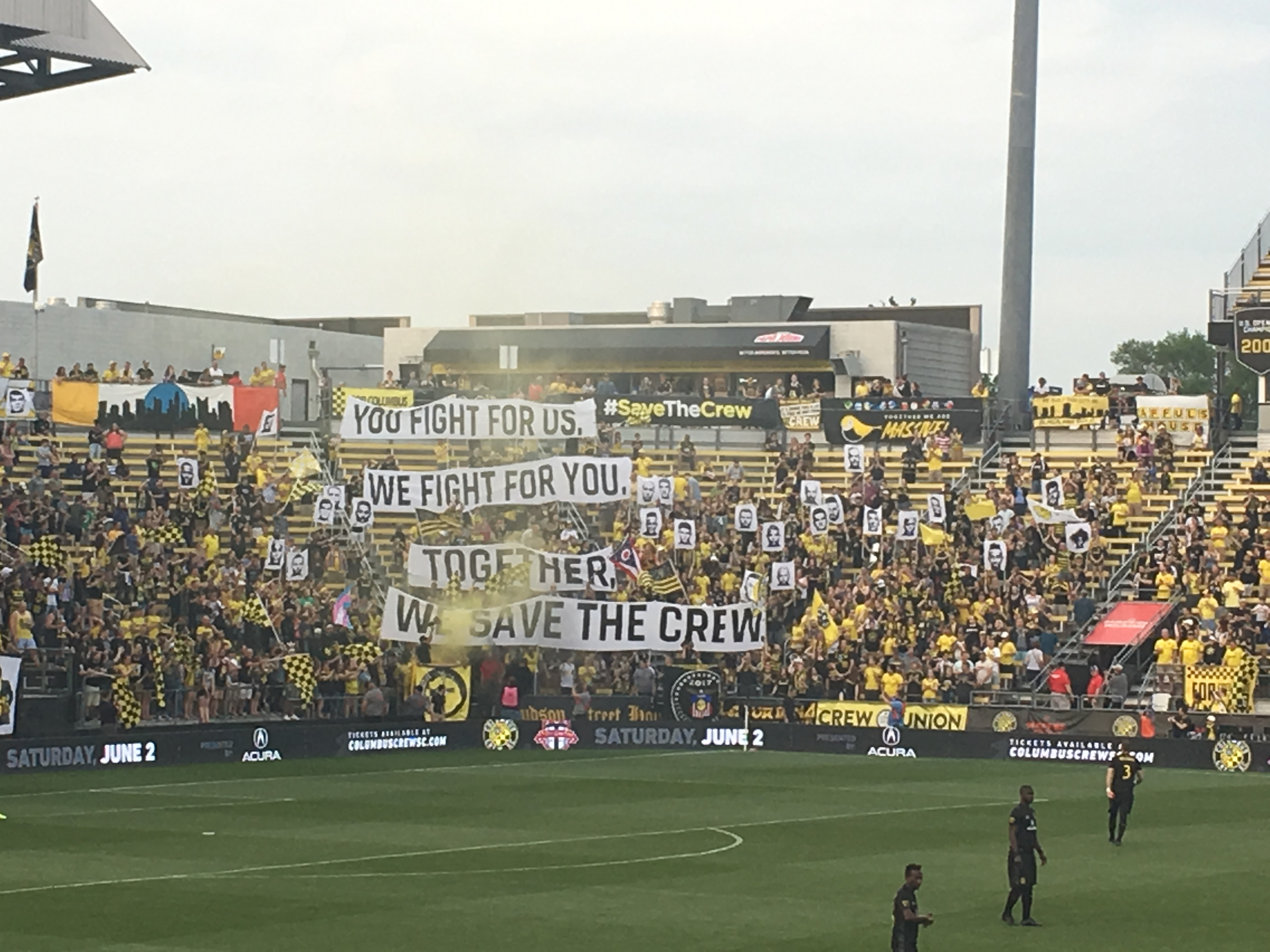
a Nordecke TIFO during the Save the Crew era at Historic Crew Stadium.

== Save the Crew ==
The Nordecke and its members were an integral part to the community movement to save the Crew during the 2010s. In 2012, Precourt Sports Ventures LLC, owned by Anthony Precourt, purchased the Crew from Clark Hunt for $68 million, a then record for an MLS franchise. Unbeknownst to Crew fans at the time, Precourt and his company purchased the team with the goal to relocate the franchise to Austin, Texas. In October 2017 this plan became public knowledge due to reporting by Grant Wahl. "The Tweet" as it was referred to by supporters, marked the beginning of a year long struggle over the future of the team.

On March 5, 2018 Ohio attorney general Mike DeWine and Columbus City attorney Zach Klein filed a lawsuit against Precourt and his company, citing a previously untested state law that prevents sports teams that benefit from public funds from relocating without a six-month notice, known colloquially as the Art Modell Law. In October 2018, Cleveland Browns owner Jimmy Haslam announced his intention, along with Pete Edwards, to purchase the franchise and keep it in Columbus. In January 2019 the control of the club was officially transferred to Haslam Sports Ventures and Edwards, marking victory for the city and the fans of the club. This coincided with the announcement of plans to build a downtown stadium, that would become ScottsMiracle-Gro Field.
