= Hudson Street Hooligans =

- Established: 2006
- Type: Supporters' group
- Team: Columbus Crew
- Motto: Ne Cum Pedicabo
- Location: Columbus, Ohio
- Website: HudsonStreetHooligans.com

The Hudson Street Hooligans (HSH) are an independent supporters group for Columbus Crew of Major League Soccer. They are named for Hudson Street, which runs adjacent to Historic Crew Stadium in Old North Columbus.

== History ==
In 1996, half brothers Grant Thurmond and Cord Andrews and their friend Drew Abdalla were children when they watched Major League Soccer team Columbus Crew SC's first season. When the three men entered Ohio State University, they continued walking down Hudson Street to reach the stadium. Their enthusiasm for the team had not waned despite the soccer team's unexceptional performance which dissuaded people from attending their games. In 2006, to reinvigorate Columbus Crew SC's fan base, Thurmond, Andrews, and Abdalla formed the independent supporters' group Hudson Street Hooligans. In a 2012 interview with The Lantern, Andrews said, "We called ourselves the Hudson Street Hooligans because we had to walk up Hudson to get to the stadium."

Beginning in 2006, the club met at the local bar Ruby Tuesday during game days. In July 2010, HSH had 500 members. In August 2011, the club grew to nearly 1,000 members.

== Hudson Street Hooligans Club ==
In 2009, as HSH membership significantly increased, it was decided that the group's leadership would open a private, member's only bar. The group opened a pub, the Hudson Street Hooligans Club, in June 2010. The pub was formed as a private club so that liquor license would be less expensive. In August 2011, the club had around 700 members who supported the group with dues. To drink at the pub, members paid $10 for a social membership and $20 for full membership, which included a T-shirt and embroidered patch.

The Columbus Dispatch noted in 2011 that the "Hooligans pub is thought to be the only private, licensed club in the state created solely for the purpose of supporting a professional sports team". Although they opened their own pub, the club members intended to sustain their patronage at Ruby Tuesday.

In July 2011, the city of Columbus withdrew the pub's certificate of occupancy, citing code violations that rendered the building hazardous for a pub and gathering place. One code violation was the lack of firewalls to stop fires from traveling from the club to neighboring businesses and apartments on top of it. Another was that the club did not have several exits and exit signs, which could be problematic if there was an emergency.
