= 2024 Columbus Crew season =

Columbus Crew
2024 season
- Investor-operators: Dee Haslam; Jimmy Haslam; JW Johnson; Whitney Johnson; Dr. Pete Edwards
- Head Coach: Wilfried Nancy
- Stadium: Lower.com Field
- Major League Soccer: Conference: 2nd Overall: 2nd
- MLS Cup playoffs: Round one
- CONCACAF Champions Cup: Runners-up
- Leagues Cup: Champions
- Campeones Cup: Runners-up
- Top goalscorer: League: Cucho Hernández (19); All: Cucho Hernández (25)
- Highest home attendance: 20,927 (4/27 v. MTL)
- Lowest home attendance: 20,314 (3/16 v. NYRB)
- Average home league attendance: 20,646 (101.3%)
- Biggest win: CLB 4–0 SKC (6/22); NE 1–5 CLB (6/29); CLB 4–0 TOR (7/6); LAFC 1–5 CLB (7/13); CLB 4–0 SKC (8/9)
- Biggest defeat: PAC 3–0 CLB (6/1)
Home colors	Away colors

The 2024 Columbus Crew season was the club's 29th season of existence and their 29th consecutive season in Major League Soccer, the top flight of soccer in the United States and Canada. The first match of the season was on February 24 against Atlanta United FC. It was their second season under head coach Wilfried Nancy. This was the first season since 2016 without defender Josh Williams, who retired at the end of the previous season.

== Roster ==
As of August 28, 2024

Note: Flags indicate national team as defined under FIFA eligibility rules; some limited exceptions apply. Players may hold more than one non-FIFA nationality.

No.	Pos.	Nation	Player
1	GK	GUA	Nicholas Hagen (SUP)
2	DF	ARG	Andrés Herrera (on loan River Plate) (INT)
4	DF	FRA	Rudy Camacho (INT)
5	MF	USA	Derrick Jones
6	MF	USA	Darlington Nagbe (captain; DP)
7	MF	FRA	Dylan Chambost (INT)
9	FW	COL	Cucho Hernández (INT; DP)
10	FW	URU	Diego Rossi (DP)
12	DF	USA	DeJuan Jones
13	MF	USA	Aziel Jackson (SUP)
14	MF	GHA	Yaw Yeboah (INT)
16	MF	MAR	Taha Habroune (SUP; HGP)

No.	Pos.	Nation	Player
17	FW	USA	Christian Ramirez
18	DF	DEN	Malte Amundsen
19	FW	CAN	Jacen Russell-Rowe (SUP; HGP)
20	FW	ROU	Alexandru Mățan (INT)
21	DF	UKR	Yevhen Cheberko (INT)
22	GK	MEX	Abraham Romero (SUP)
23	DF	ALG	Mohamed Farsi (INT)
24	GK	USA	Evan Bush (SUP)
25	MF	USA	Sean Zawadzki (HGP)
27	DF	USA	Maximilian Arfsten
28	GK	USA	Patrick Schulte (SUP; GA)
31	DF	CPV	Steven Moreira (INT)

=== Out on loan ===
Note: Flags indicate national team as defined under FIFA eligibility rules; some limited exceptions apply. Players may hold more than one non-FIFA nationality.

No.	Pos.	Nation	Player
—	DF	USA	Keegan Hughes (HGP) (on loan to Loudoun United)
11	MF	COL	Marino Hinestroza (on loan to Atletico Nacional)
29	MF	USA	Cole Mrowka (HGP) (on loan to Colorado Springs Switchbacks FC)

== Technical Staff ==
Position	Staff
General Manager	(France) Issa Tall
Head Coach	(France) Wilfried Nancy
Assistant Coach	(Republic of Ireland) Kwame Ampadu
Assistant Coach	(France) Yoann Damet
Goalkeeper Coach	(United States) Phil Boerger
Assistant Coach and Fitness Coach	(Canada) Jules Gueguen
Video Performance Coach	(France) Maxime Chalier
Assistant Video Coach Analyst	(Uruguay) Juan Giuffra
Technical Director	(United States) Marc Nicholls
Vice President, Soccer Administration & Operations	(United States) Jaime McMillan
Director of Analytics	(United States) Alex Mysiw
Senior Manager, Soccer Systems	(United States) Dustin Kadri
Director, Player Personnel	(United States) George Gallagher
Manager, Player Personnel	(United States) Marshall Bushnell
Director, Soccer Administration	(United States) Kathy Scheiferstein
Manager of Equipment Operations	(United States) David Brauzer
Assistant Equipment Manager	(United States) Derrick Contreras
Director of Soccer Operations	(United States) Julio Velasquez
Manager, Player Care & Team Operations	(United States) Elena Lemus
Head of Sport Science & Medicine	(United States) Chris Shenberger
Head Athletic Trainer	(United States) Chris Rumsey
Assistant Athletic Trainer	(United States) Daniel Givens
Assistant Athletic Trainer	(United States) Catherine Hill
Sports Scientist	(Australia) Callum McCaskie
Performance Coach, End Stage Rehabilitation & Injury Prevention	(United States) Ahmad Salamah
Strength and Conditioning Coach	(United States) Luis Jeronimo
Sports Dietitian	(United States) Kyla Cross

Source: []

== Non-competitive ==
=== Preseason ===
February 10 Friendly	Columbus Crew	v	Toronto FC	Santa Barbara, CA
		Report
Note: Closed-door; two 45-minute halves with an additional 30-minute period at the end; no score released

=== Midseason ===
Columbus Crew 2 players Stanislav Lapkes and Owen Presthus joined the first team as guest players against Aston Villa.

July 27 Friendly	Columbus Crew	4–1	Aston Villa	Columbus, OH
8:00 PM EDT	Hernández 14', 29', 45'; Chambost 52'	Report	Archer 44'	Stadium: Lower.com Field; Attendance: 20,218

== Competitive ==
=== Overview ===
Competition	First match	Last match	Starting round	Final position	Record							
Competition	First match	Last match	Starting round	Final position	Pld	W	D	L	GF	GA	GD	Win %
Major League Soccer	February 24, 2024	October 19, 2024	Matchday 1	2nd	34	19	6	9	72	40	+32	55.88
MLS Cup playoffs	October 29, 2024	November 3, 2024	Round One	Round One	2	0	1	1	2	3	−1	0.00
CONCACAF Champions Cup	March 6, 2024	June 1, 2024	Round of 16	Final	7	3	3	1	9	8	+1	42.86
Leagues Cup	August 9, 2024	August 25, 2024	Round of 32	Winners	5	4	1	0	14	5	+9	80.00
Campeones Cup	September 25, 2024	September 25, 2024	Final	Final	1	0	1	0	1	1	+0	0.00
Total					49	26	12	11	98	57	+41	53.06

Source: Competitions

=== MLS ===
==== Standings ====
===== Eastern Conference =====
MLS Eastern Conference table (2024)
Pos	Team	Pld	W	L	T	GF	GA	GD	Pts	Qualification
1	Inter Miami CF	34	22	4	8	79	49	+30	74	Qualification for round one, the 2025 Leagues Cup and the CONCACAF Champions Cup round one
2	Columbus Crew	34	19	6	9	72	40	+32	66	Qualification for round one and the 2025 Leagues Cup
3	FC Cincinnati	34	18	11	5	58	48	+10	59	Qualification for round one and the 2025 Leagues Cup
4	Orlando City SC	34	15	12	7	59	50	+9	52	Qualification for round one and the 2025 Leagues Cup
5	Charlotte FC	34	14	11	9	46	37	+9	51	Qualification for round one and the 2025 Leagues Cup

Source: MLS
Rules for classification: 1) points; 2) total wins; 3) total goal differential; 4) total goals scored; 5) fewer disciplinary points; 6) away goal differential; 7) away goals scored; 8) home goals differential; 9) home goals scored; 10) coin toss (2 clubs tied) or drawing of lots (≥3 clubs tied)

===== Overall table =====
Overall MLS standings table
Pos	Team	Pld	W	L	T	GF	GA	GD	Pts	Qualification
1	Inter Miami CF (S)	34	22	4	8	79	49	+30	74	Qualification for the 2025 FIFA Club World Cup group stage and CONCACAF Champions Cup Round One (Note: As 2024 MLS Supporters' Shield champions)
2	Columbus Crew (L)	34	19	6	9	72	40	+32	66	Qualification for the CONCACAF Champions Cup Round of 16 (Note: As winners of Leagues Cup)
3	Los Angeles FC (U)	34	19	8	7	63	43	+20	64	Qualification for the CONCACAF Champions Cup Round One (Note: As runners-up of Leagues Cup)
4	LA Galaxy (C)	34	19	8	7	69	50	+19	64	Qualification for the CONCACAF Champions Cup Round of 16 (Note: As 2024 MLS Cup champions)
5	FC Cincinnati	34	18	11	5	58	48	+10	59	Qualification for the CONCACAF Champions Cup Round One (Note: As highest-ranked club in 2024 MLS Supporters' Shield not already qualified)

Source: MLS
Rules for classification: 1) points; 2) total wins; 3) total goal differential; 4) total goals scored; 5) fewer disciplinary points; 6) away goal differential; 7) away goals scored; 8) home goals differential; 9) home goals scored; 10) coin toss (2 clubs tied) or drawing of lots (≥3 clubs tied)
(C) MLS Cup champions; (L) Leagues Cup winners; (S) Supporters' Shield winners; (U) U.S. Open Cup winners

==== Results summary ====
Overall								Home						Away					
Pld	Pts	W	L	T	GF	GA	GD	W	L	T	GF	GA	GD	W	L	T	GF	GA	GD
34	66	19	6	9	72	40	+32	10	3	3	38	21	+17	9	3	6	34	19	+15

Source: MLS standings
Pld = Matches played; Pts = Points; W = Matches won; T = Matches tied; L = Matches lost; GF = Goals for; GA = Goals against; GD = Goal difference

==== Results by round ====
Round	1	2	3	4	5	6	7	8	9	10	11	12	13	14	15	16	17	18	19	20	21	22	23	24	25	26	27	28	29	30	31	32	33	34
Stadium	H	A	H	H	A	A	H	A	H	H	H	A	A	A	H	A	H	A	H	H	A	H	A	H	H	H	A	A	H	A	H	H	H	A
Result	W	D	W	W	L	D	D	D	D	D	L	W	W	W	W	L	W	W	W	W	W	D	L	W	W	L	D	W	W	D	L	W	W	W

Source: Columbus schedule
A = Away; H = Home; W = Win; D = Draw; L = Loss

==== Match results ====
February 24 1	Columbus Crew	1–0	Atlanta United FC	Columbus, OH
2:00 PM EST	Hernández 27'	Report	Giakoumakis (yellow card) 21'; Gregersen (yellow card) 53'	Stadium: Lower.com Field; Attendance: 20,406; Referee: Rafael Bonilla; Assistant referees: Albert Escovar; Derek Guerrier; Fourth official: Lorant Varga

March 2 2	Minnesota United FC	1–1	Columbus Crew	Saint Paul, MN
2:00 PM EST	Taylor (yellow card) 54'; Oluwaseyi 90+5'	Report	Hernández 59'	Stadium: Allianz Field; Attendance: 19,906; Referee: Amin Hadzic; Assistant referees: Race Williams; Leo Mora; Fourth official: Dimitar Chadarav

March 9 3	Columbus Crew	2–1	Chicago Fire FC	Columbus, OH
7:30 PM EST	Russell-Rowe 68'; Malte Amundsen (yellow card) 90'; Farsi 90+10'	Report	Arigoni (yellow card) 13'; Herbers 74'; Barlow (yellow card) 90+5'	Stadium: Lower.com Field; Attendance: 20,327; Referee: Richonne Clark; Assistant referees: Andrew Hanks; Nicola Vesia; Fourth official: Emmy Nonso

March 16 4	Columbus Crew	3–0	New York Red Bulls	Columbus, OH
7:30 PM EDT	Hernández 13', (yellow card) 45'; Russell-Rowe 56'; Morris 66'; Nagbe (yellow card) 83'	Report	Edelman (yellow card) 28' (yellow-red card) 90+6'; Burke (yellow card) 68'; Duncan (yellow card) 74'	Stadium: Lower.com Field; Attendance: 20,314; Referee: Andrew Musashe; Assistant referees: Eric Del Rosario; Fernando Pina; Fourth official: Gabriele Ciampi

March 23 5	Charlotte FC	2–0	Columbus Crew	Charlotte, NC
7:30 PM EDT	Westwood (yellow card) 11', (goal) 83'; Tavares (yellow card) 69'; Agyemang (yellow card) 81', (goal) 88'; Pedro (yellow card) 85'; Petković (yellow card) 90+1'; Vargas (yellow card) 90+4'	Report	Jones (red card) 26'; Yeboah (yellow card) 45+15'; Rossi (yellow card) 45+15'; Bush (yellow card) 57'	Stadium: Bank of America Stadium; Attendance: 30,104; Referee: Christopher Calderon; Assistant referees: Rogelio Alvarez; Ryan Starr; Fourth official: Wesley Costa Wesley Costa

March 30 6	Nashville SC	2–2	Columbus Crew	Nashville, TN
8:30 PM EDT	Mukhtar 45+3', (yellow card) 90+2'; Godoy 45+9'; Maher (yellow card) 48'; Bauer (yellow card) 90'	Report	Zawadzki 17'; Amundsen (yellow card) 66'; Hinestroza 79'	Stadium: Geodis Park; Attendance: 28,613; Referee: Jon Freemon; Assistant referees: Cory Richardson; Kali Smith; Fourth official: Luis Diego Arroyo

April 6 7	Columbus Crew	1–1	D.C. United	Columbus, OH
7:30 PM EDT	Rossi (yellow card) 44'; Hernández (red card) 75'; Morris 87'	Report	Benteke 61', (yellow card) 90+4'; Herrera (yellow card) 79'	Stadium: Lower.com Field; Attendance: 20,740; Referee: Pierre-Luc Lauziere; Assistant referees: Lyes Arfa; Brian Poeschel; Fourth official: Eric Tattersall

April 13 8	Real Salt Lake	0–0	Columbus Crew	Sandy, UT
9:30 PM EDT	Crooks (yellow card) 13'; Ojeda (yellow card) 45+3'; Eneli (yellow card) 46'; Vera (yellow card) 57'; Arango (yellow card) 65'; Katranis (yellow card) 90+1'	Report	Quinton (yellow card) 22'; Arfsten (yellow card) 45+6'; Habroune (yellow card) 59'	Stadium: America First Field; Attendance: 20,033; Referee: Ramy Touchan; Assistant referees: Jason White; Brooke Mayo; Fourth official: Thomas Snyder

April 20 9	Columbus Crew	2–2	Portland Timbers	Columbus, OH
7:30 PM EDT	Hernández 51'; Moreira 74'; Zawadzki (yellow card) 80'	Report	Mora 10'; Moreno 57'; Rodríguez (yellow card) 59'	Stadium: Lower.com Field; Attendance: 20,740; Referee: Ted Unkel; Assistant referees: Corey Rockwell; Ryan Graves; Fourth official: Greg Dopka

April 27 10	Columbus Crew	0–0	CF Montréal	Columbus, OH
7:30 PM EDT	Amundsen (yellow card) 76'	Report	Piette (yellow card) 22'; Campbell (yellow card) 62'; Choinière (yellow card) 87'; Álvarez (yellow card) 90+4'	Stadium: Lower.com Field; Attendance: 20,927; Referee: Tori Penso; Assistant referees: Cameron Blanchard; Jeremy Hanson; Fourth official: Guido Gonzales Jr.

May 11 11	Columbus Crew	1–2	FC Cincinnati	Columbus, OH
7:30 PM EDT	Zawadzki (yellow card) 38'; Camacho (yellow card) 80'; Arfsten 89'	Report	Miazga (yellow card) 34'; Kubo (yellow card) 37'; Nwobodo (yellow card) 70'; Kelsy 74'; Acosta 76'	Stadium: Lower.com Field; Attendance: 20,900; Referee: Guido Gonzales, Jr. Assistant referees: Andrew Bigelow; Jeffrey Swartzel; Fourth official: Joshua Encarnación

May 15 12	CF Montréal	1–3	Columbus Crew	Montreal, QC
7:30 PM EDT	Choinière (yellow card) 35', (goal) 45+2'; Lassiter (yellow card) 39'	Report	Arfsten 19'; Camacho (yellow card) 41'; Schulte (yellow card) 45+1'; Rossi 59'; Yeboah (yellow card) 77'; Hinestroza 89'	Stadium: Saputo Stadium; Attendance: 19,619; Referee: Mark Allatin; Assistant referees: Lyes Arfa; Walt Heatherly; Fourth official: Filip Dujic

May 18 13	Chicago Fire FC	1–3	Columbus Crew	Chicago, IL
8:30 PM EDT	Czichos (yellow card) 24'; Gutiérrez (yellow card) 45'; Terán 85'; Navarro (yellow card) 90+3'	Report	Diego Rossi 30'; Ramirez 55'; Russell-Rowe 88'	Stadium: Soldier Field; Attendance: 23,319; Referee: Ricardo Fierro; Assistant referees: Brooke Mayo; Jeremy Hanson; Fourth official: Lukasz Szpala

May 25 14	Orlando City SC	0–2	Columbus Crew	Orlando, FL
7:30 PM EDT	Araújo (yellow card) 45'; Felipe (yellow card) 89'	Report	Rossi 45+1', 61'; Camacho (yellow card) 56'; Schulte (yellow card) 70'	Stadium: Inter&Co Stadium; Attendance: 21,726; Referee: Jair Marrufo; Assistant referees: Jose Da Silva; Tyler Wyrostek; Fourth official: Marcos DeOliveira II

June 14 15	New York City FC	2–3	Columbus Crew	New York, NY
7:30 PM EDT	Tanasijević (yellow card) 32'; Ilenič (red card) 39'; Ojeda 44'; Rodríguez 86', (yellow card) 90+15'; Moralez (yellow card) 90+9'; Parks (yellow card) 90+10'	Report	Ramírez 48'; Farsi 53'; Cheberko (yellow card) 58'; Hernández 65'; Rossi (yellow card) 90+1'	Stadium: Yankee Stadium; Attendance: 20,622; Referee: Alexis Da Silva; Assistant referees: Jason White; Justin Howard; Fourth official: Elvis Osmanovic

June 19 16	Inter Miami CF	2–1	Columbus Crew	Fort Lauderdale, FL
7:30 PM EDT	Fray 10'; Allen (yellow card) 14'; Campana 21'; Alba (yellow card) 85'	Report	Hernández 40'	Stadium: Chase Stadium; Attendance: 19,939; Referee: Serhiy Boyko; Assistant referees: Cameron Blanchard; Chris Elliott; Fourth official: Natalie Simon

June 22 17	Columbus Crew	4–0	Sporting Kansas City	Columbus, OH
7:30 PM EDT	Hernández 32', 45+2', 71'; Ramirez 66'	Report	Rodríguez (yellow card) 57'; Rosero (yellow card) 75'	Stadium: Lower.com Field; Attendance: 20,818; Referee: Marcos DeOliveira II; Assistant referees: Ian McKay; Chantal Boudreau; Fourth official: Nabil Bensalah

June 29 18	New England Revolution	1–5	Columbus Crew	Foxborough, MA
7:30 PM EDT	Boateng 9'	Report	Hernández 17'; Arfsten 42'; Amundsen (yellow card) 45'; Rossi 45+2'; Camacho 72'; Moreira 80'	Stadium: Gillette Stadium; Attendance: 25,004; Referee: Ricardo Fierro; Assistant referees: Chris Wattam; Andrew Bigelow; Fourth official: Ismir Pekmic

July 3 19	Columbus Crew	2–0	Nashville SC	Columbus, OH
7:30 PM EDT	Ramirez 30'; Rossi 65'	Report	Anunga (yellow card) 46'; Yearwood (yellow card) 78'	Stadium: Lower.com Field; Attendance: 20,411; Referee: Joe Dickerson; Assistant referees: Kevin Klinger; Kali Smith; Fourth official: Pierre-Luc Lauziere

July 6 20	Columbus Crew	4–0	Toronto FC	Columbus, OH
7:30 PM EDT	Hernández 15'; Ramirez 52'; Nagbe (yellow card) 72'; Farsi 81'; Rossi 85'	Report	Bernardeschi (yellow card) 45+8'; Etienne Jr. (yellow card) 67'; Franklin (yellow card) 86'; Thompson (yellow card) 90'	Stadium: Lower.com Field; Attendance: 20,547; Referee: Ted Unkel; Assistant referees: Ryan Graves; Kevin Lock; Fourth official: Elvis Osmanovic

July 13 21	Los Angeles FC	1–5	Columbus Crew	Los Angeles, CA
10:30 PM EDT	Palencia (yellow card) 41' (yellow-red card) 83'; Dueñas (yellow card) 63'; Sánchez (yellow card) 65'; Ordaz 85'; Murillo (red card) 90+7'	Report	Ramirez 38', 84'; Hernández 56'; Rossi 60'; Mățan 89'; Hinestroza (red card) 90+7'	Stadium: BMO Stadium; Attendance: 22,127; Referee: Lukasz Szpala; Assistant referees: Logan Brown; Ben Pilgrim; Fourth official: Malik Badawi

July 17 22	Columbus Crew	1–1	Charlotte FC	Columbus, OH
7:30 PM EDT	Hernández 31'; Zawadzki (yellow card) 57'	Report	Agyemang 84'; Petković (yellow card) 89'; Byrne (yellow card) 90+4'	Stadium: Lower.com Field; Attendance: 20,793; Referee: Victor Rivas; Assistant referees: Walt Heatherly; Oscar Mitchell-Carvalho; Fourth official: Calin Radosav

July 20 23	Atlanta United FC	2–1	Columbus Crew	Atlanta, GA
7:30 PM EDT	Muyumba (yellow card) 25'; Gregersen 60', 77'; Guzan (yellow card) 90+7'	Report	Cheberko (yellow card) 29'; Rossi 36'	Stadium: Mercedes-Benz Stadium; Attendance: 42,601; Referee: Rosendo Mendoza; Assistant referees: Corey Parker; Jeffrey Swartzel; Fourth official: Nabil Bensalah

August 28 24	Philadelphia Union	0–1	Columbus Crew	Chester, PA
7:30 PM EDT		Report	Jones (yellow card) 3'; Yeboah 75'; Amundsen (yellow card) 89'; Schulte (yellow card) 90+6'	Stadium: Subaru Park; Attendance: 18,513; Referee: Ismir Pekmic; Assistant referees: Corey Parker; Mike Nickerson; Fourth official: Joshua Encarnacion

August 31 25	Columbus Crew	4–2	New York City FC	Columbus, OH
7:30 PM EDT	Rossi 17'; Amundsen (yellow card) 21'; Arfsten 58'; Jones 90+3'; Russell-Rowe 90+10'	Report	Martínez 4'; Moralez (yellow card) 72'; Rodríguez (yellow card) 85'; Bakrar 86'; Fernández (red card) 90+7'	Stadium: Lower.com Field; Attendance: 20,618; Referee: Ted Unkel; Assistant referees: Kyle Atkins; Ryan Graves; Fourth official: Calin Radosav

September 7 26	Columbus Crew	0–4	Seattle Sounders FC	Columbus, OH
7:30 PM EDT	Romero (red card) 45+3'	Report	de la Vega (yellow card) 29'; Rusnák 45+6', 67', 70'; Morris 60'	Stadium: Lower.com Field; Attendance: 20,523; Referee: Rosendo Mendoza; Assistant referees: Cory Richardson; Kevin Lock; Fourth official: Marcos DeOliveira II
Note: Match was rescheduled from June 1 due to Columbus Crews's participation in 2024 CONCACAF Champions Cup final.

September 14 27	FC Cincinnati	0–0	Columbus Crew	Cincinnati, OH
7:30 PM EDT	Awaziem (yellow card) 78'; Nwobodo (yellow card) 88'	Report	Hernández (yellow card) 68'	Stadium: TQL Stadium; Attendance: 25,513; Referee: Joe Dickerson; Assistant referees: Chris Elliott; Jason White; Fourth official: Alexis Da Silva

September 18 28	Toronto FC	0–2	Columbus Crew	Toronto, ON
7:30 PM EDT	Laryea (yellow card) 78'; Bernardeschi (yellow card) 79'	Report	Hernández 51'; Herrera 70'; Jones (yellow card) 85'; Mățan (yellow card) 90'	Stadium: BMO Field; Attendance: 21,355; Referee: Guido Gonzales Jr. Assistant referees: Lyes Arfa; Gianni Facchini; Fourth official: Lukasz Szpala

September 21 29	Columbus Crew	4–3	Orlando City SC	Columbus, OH
7:30 PM EDT	Rossi 30'; Mățan (yellow card) 44'; Ramirez 51'; Hernández 71'; Yeboah (yellow card) 77'; Jackson 85'	Report	Enrique 74'; Muriel 78' (pen.), 90+7'; Smith (yellow card) 82'; Angulo (yellow card) 89'	Stadium: Lower.com Field; Attendance: 20,868; Referee: Serhiy Boyko; Assistant referees: Corey Parker; Zachary McWhorter; Fourth official: Fotis Bazakos

September 28 30	D.C. United	2–2	Columbus Crew	Washington, D.C.
7:30 PM EDT	Benteke 30'; Klich (yellow card) 47'; Benteke 81'	Report	Cheberko (yellow card) 47'; Hernández 54', (yellow card) 89'; Russell-Rowe 57'; Rossi (yellow card) 77'	Stadium: Audi Field; Attendance: 17,806; Referee: Rubiel Vazquez; Assistant referees: Jose Da Silva; Matthew Nelson; Fourth official: Joshua Encarnacion

October 2 31	Columbus Crew	2–3	Inter Miami CF	Columbus, OH
7:30 PM EDT	Rossi 46'; Camacho (yellow card) 59' (yellow-red card) 63'; Hernández 61' (pen.)	Report	Redondo (yellow card) 38'; Messi 45', 45+5'; Suárez 48'; Weigandt (yellow card) 49'; Bright (yellow card) 87'	Stadium: Lower.com Field; Attendance: 20,815; Referee: Drew Fischer; Assistant referees: Kathryn Nesbitt; Brooke Mayo; Fourth official: Sergii Demianchuk

October 5 32	Columbus Crew	3–2	Philadelphia Union	Columbus, OH
7:30 PM EDT	Hernández 4', 76'; Herrera (yellow card) 11'; Farsi 41'; Cheberko (yellow card) 90+2'	Report	Harriel 25'; McGlynn 41'	Stadium: Lower.com Field; Attendance: 20,788; Referee: Allen Chapman; Assistant referees: Logan Brown; Meghan Mullen; Fourth official: Thomas Snyder

October 12 33	Columbus Crew	4–0	New England Revolution	Columbus, OH
7:30 PM EDT	Jones 5'; Mățan 14', 64', 72'	Report	Romney (yellow card) 51'; Boateng (yellow card) 79'	Stadium: Lower.com Field; Attendance: 20,439; Referee: Filip Dujic; Assistant referees: Peter Balciunas; Eduardo Jeff; Fourth official: Serhiy Boyko
Note: Match was rescheduled from May 29 due to Columbus Crews's participation in 2024 CONCACAF Champions Cup final.

October 19 34	New York Red Bulls	2–3	Columbus Crew	Harrison, NJ
6:00 PM EDT	Forsberg 78', 87' (pen.); Ngoma Jr. (yellow card) 90'	Report	Jackson 2'; Cheberko 14'; Jones (yellow card) 35'; Arfsten (yellow card) 45+2'; Amundsen (yellow card) 47', (goal) 90+7'	Stadium: Red Bull Arena; Attendance: 24,515; Referee: Guido Gonzales Jr. Assistant referees: Ian McKay; Nick Uranga; Fourth official: Ricardo Fierro

=== MLS Cup playoffs ===
==== Round One ====
October 29 Game 1	Columbus Crew	0–1	New York Red Bulls	Columbus, OH
6:45 PM EDT	Arfsten (yellow card) 57'	Report	Carballo 25'; Forsberg (yellow card) 45+1'; Eile (yellow card) 90+4'	Stadium: Lower.com Field; Attendance: 19,050; Referee: Timothy Ford; Assistant referees: Logan Brown; Matthew Nelson; Fourth official: Fotis Bazakos

November 3 Game 2	New York Red Bulls	2–2 (5–4 p)	Columbus Crew	Harrison, NJ
4:30 PM EST	Carballo (yellow card) 49'; Vanzeir 64'; Forsberg 80' (pen.); Nealis (yellow card) 90+5'	Report	Arfsten 55'; Hernández (yellow card) 90'; Ramirez 90+6'	Stadium: Red Bull Arena; Attendance: 20,936; Referee: Filip Dujic; Assistant referees: Jason White; Adam Wienckowski; Fourth official: Mark Allatin
	Penalties
	Tolkin (penalty missed); Eile (penalty scored); Carmona (penalty scored); Elias Manoel (penalty scored); Forsberg (penalty scored); Nealis (penalty missed); Edelman (penalty scored)		(penalty scored) Rossi; (penalty scored) Ramirez; (penalty scored) Hernández; (penalty scored) Russell-Rowe; (penalty missed) Cheberko; (penalty missed) Arfsten; (penalty missed) Mățan
Note: New York Red Bulls won the series 2–0.

=== CONCACAF Champions Cup ===
==== Round of 16 ====
March 6 Leg 1	Houston Dynamo FC (United States)	0–1	(United States) Columbus Crew	Houston, TX
8:00 PM EST	Bartlow (yellow card) 64'	Report	Mățan 90+6'	Stadium: Shell Energy Stadium; Attendance: 4,379; Referee: Armando Villarreal (United States); Assistant referees: Cory Richardson (United States); Logan Brown (United States); Fourth official: Victor Rivas (United States)

March 12 Leg 2	Columbus Crew (United States)	1–1 (2–1 agg.)	(United States) Houston Dynamo FC	Columbus, OH
6:00 PM EDT	Yeboah (yellow card) 29'; Hernández 40'	Report	Dorsey 90' (pen.); Micael (yellow card) 90+2'; Schmitt (yellow card) 90+4'	Stadium: Lower.com Field; Attendance: 12,420; Referee: Oshane Nation (Jamaica); Assistant referees: Caleb Wales (Trinidad and Tobago); Ojay Duhaney (Jamaica); Fourth official: Rubiel Vazquez (United States)
Note: Columbus Crew won the series 2–1

==== Quarterfinals ====
April 2 Leg 1	Columbus Crew (United States)	1–1	(Mexico) Tigres UANL	Columbus, OH
9:00 PM EDT	Rossi 43'; Morris (yellow card) 75' (yellow-red card) 77'; Jones (yellow card) 84'	Report	Gignac 18'	Stadium: Lower.com Field; Attendance: 8,587; Referee: Selvin Brown (Honduras); Assistant referees: Gerson Orellana (Honduras); Emanuel Aguirre (Nicaragua); Fourth official: Mario Escobar (Guatemala)

April 9 Leg 2	Tigres UANL (Mexico)	1–1 (a.e.t.) (2–2 agg.) (3–4 p)	(United States) Columbus Crew	San Nicolás de los Garza, Mexico
7:15 PM PM EDT	Gignac 3'; Pizarro (yellow card) 16'; Quiñones (yellow card) 102'	Report	Moreira (yellow card) 45+2'; Rossi 59'	Stadium: Estadio Universitario; Attendance: 36,611; Referee: Bryan López (Guatemala); Assistant referees: Luis Aroldo Ventura (Guatemala); Humberto Panjoj (Guatemala); Fourth official: Keylor Herrera (Costa Rica)
	Penalties
	Gignac (penalty missed); Pizarro (penalty missed); Herrera (penalty scored); Córdova (penalty scored); Angulo (penalty scored)		(penalty scored) Rossi; (penalty scored) Russell-Rowe; (penalty scored) Mățan; (penalty missed) Hernández; (penalty scored) Arfsten
Note: Tied 2–2 on aggregate. Columbus Crew won 4–3 on penalties.

==== Semifinals ====
April 24 Leg 1	Columbus Crew (United States)	2–1	(Mexico) C.F. Monterrey	Columbus, OH
8:15 PM EDT	Hernández 25'; Russell-Rowe 73'; Mățan (yellow card) 87'	Report	Meza 58', (yellow card) 67'; Moreno (yellow card) 90+2'	Stadium: Lower.com Field; Attendance: 17,145; Referee: Oshane Nation (Jamaica); Assistant referees: Caleb Wales (Trinidad and Tobago); Ojay Duhaney (Jamaica); Fourth official: Julio César Luna (Guatemala)

May 1 Leg 2	C.F. Monterrey (Mexico)	1–3 (2–5 agg.)	(United States) Columbus Crew	Guadalupe, Mexico
9:15 PM EDT	Cheberko 11' (o.g.); Vegas (yellow card) 34'; González (red card) 90+8'	Report	Nagbe (yellow card) 7'; Morris 45+4'; Rossi 49'; Russell-Rowe 89'	Stadium: Estadio BBVA; Referee: Juan Calderon Perez (Costa Rica); Assistant referees: Juan Mora (Costa Rica); William Arrieta (Costa Rica); Fourth official: Walter López (Guatemala)

==== Final ====
June 1	C.F. Pachuca (Mexico)	3–0	(United States) Columbus Crew	Pachuca, Mexico
8:15 PM EDT	Rondón 12', 67'; E. Rodríguez 32'; Idrissi (yellow card) 45+2'	Report		Stadium: Estadio Hidalgo; Referee: Iván Barton (El Salvador); Assistant referees: David Morán (El Salvador); Henri Pupiro (Nicaragua); Fourth official: Ismael Cornejo (El Salvador)

=== Leagues Cup ===
==== Knockout stage ====
August 9 Round of 32	Columbus Crew (United States)	4–0	(United States) Sporting Kansas City	Columbus, OH
7:30 PM EDT	Rossi 44', 57'; Jones 77'; Chambost 79'	Report		Stadium: Lower.com Field; Attendance: 20,397; Referee: Juan Calderon Perez (Costa Rica); Assistant referees: William Arrieta (Costa Rica); William Chow (Costa Rica); Fourth official: Marianela Araya (Costa Rica)

August 13 Round of 16	Columbus Crew (United States)	3–2	(United States) Inter Miami CF	Columbus, OH
7:30 PM EDT	Ramirez 67'; Rossi 69', 80'; Mățan (yellow card) 90'	Report	Rojas 10'; Weigandt (yellow card) 41'; Gómez 62'	Stadium: Lower.com Field; Attendance: 14,031; Referee: Iván Barton (El Salvador); Assistant referees: David Morán (El Salvador); Henri Pupiro (Nicaragua); Fourth official: Ismael Cornejo (El Salvador)

August 17 Quarter-finals	Columbus Crew (United States)	1–1 (4–3 p)	(United States) New York City FC	Columbus, OH
6:00 PM EDT	Hernández 41'	Report	Martínez 1'; McFarlane (yellow card) 26'; Rodríguez (yellow card) 88'	Stadium: Lower.com Field; Attendance: 14,071; Referee: Joe Dickerson (United States); Assistant referees: Corey Parker (United States); Logan Brown (United States); Fourth official: Rubiel Vazquez (United States)
	Penalties
	Camacho (penalty scored); Russell-Rowe (penalty scored); Rossi (penalty missed); Hernández (penalty scored); Jones (penalty scored)		(penalty scored) Thiago Martins; (penalty scored) Bakrar; (penalty missed) Moralez; (penalty scored) Sands; (penalty missed) Rodríguez

August 21 Semi-finals	Columbus Crew (United States)	3–1	(United States) Philadelphia Union	Columbus, OH
7:30 PM EDT	Rossi 12', 43'; Zawadzki (yellow card) 49'; Hernández 53'	Report	Gazdag 32'; Bueno (yellow card) 90+1'	Stadium: Lower.com Field; Attendance: 12,784; Referee: Armando Villarreal (United States); Assistant referees: Cory Richardson (United States); Kyle Atkins (United States); Fourth official: Jon Freemon (United States)

August 25 Final	Columbus Crew (United States)	3–1	(United States) Los Angeles FC	Columbus, OH
7:15 PM EDT	Camacho (yellow card) 11'; Hernández 45', 90+2'; Russell-Rowe 90+4'	Report	Atuesta (yellow card) 37'; Chanot (yellow card) 49'; Giroud 57'	Stadium: Lower.com Field; Attendance: 20,190; Referee: Oshane Nation (Jamaica); Assistant referees: Caleb Wales (Trinidad and Tobago); Ojay Duhaney (Jamaica); Fourth official: Cesar Ramos (Mexico)

=== Campeones Cup ===
September 25 Final	Columbus Crew (United States)	1–1 (4–5 p)	(Mexico) América	Columbus, OH
7:30 PM EDT	Zawadzki (yellow card) 32'; Amundsen 77'; Cucho (yellow card) 90+1'	Report	Dávila 67'	Stadium: Lower.com Field; Attendance: 20,198; Referee: Walter López Castellanos (Guatemala); Assistant referees: Keytzel Corrales (Nicaragua); Helpys Feliz (Dominican Republic); Fourth official: Bryan López (Guatemala)
	Penalties
	Camcho (penalty scored); Mățan (penalty missed); Russell-Rowe (penalty scored); Cucho (penalty scored); Jones (penalty scored); Jackson (penalty missed); Amundsen (penalty missed)		(penalty scored) Valdés; (penalty missed) R. Sánchez; (penalty scored) Aguirre; (penalty scored) Fidalgo; (penalty scored) Dávila; (penalty missed) Juárez; (penalty scored) Araujo

=== U.S. Open Cup ===
Columbus Crew was not sent to the tournament, and neither was their MLS Next Pro team Columbus Crew 2 following the deal reached on March 1, 2024, due to participation in the 2024 CONCACAF Champions Cup.

== Statistics ==
=== Appearances and goals ===
Under "Apps" for each section, the first number represents the number of starts, and the second number represents appearances as a substitute.

No.	Pos	Nat	Player	Total		MLS		MLS Cup Playoffs		CONCACAF Champions Cup		Leagues Cup		Campeones Cup	
No.	Pos	Nat	Player	Apps	Goals	Apps	Goals	Apps	Goals	Apps	Goals	Apps	Goals	Apps	Goals
1	GK	(Guatemala) GUA	Nicholas Hagen	7	0	3+1	0	0+0	0	0+0	0	3+0	0	0+0	0
2	DF	(Argentina) ARG	Andrés Herrera	12	1	5+5	1	0+1	0	0+0	0	0+0	0	0+1	0
4	DF	(France) FRA	Rudy Camacho	41	1	27+1	1	2+0	0	5+0	0	5+0	0	1+0	0
5	MF	(United States) USA	Derrick Jones	24	0	4+16	0	0+0	0	2+2	0	0+0	0	0+0	0
6	MF	(United States) USA	Darlington Nagbe	44	0	28+1	0	2+0	0	7+0	0	5+0	0	1+0	0
7	MF	(France) FRA	Dylan Chambost	15	1	6+4	0	1+1	0	0+0	0	1+2	1	0+0	0
9	FW	(Colombia) COL	Cucho Hernández	41	25	23+4	19	2+0	0	5+1	2	5+0	4	1+0	0
10	FW	(Uruguay) URU	Diego Rossi	48	21	30+4	12	1+0	0	6+1	3	5+0	6	1+0	0
11	MF	(Colombia) COL	Marino Hinestroza	22	2	4+12	2	0+0	0	4+2	0	0+0	0	0+0	0
12	DF	(United States) USA	DeJuan Jones	17	3	4+6	2	1+1	0	0+0	0	1+3	1	0+1	0
13	MF	(United States) USA	Aziel Jackson	16	2	9+5	2	0+1	0	0+0	0	0+0	0	0+1	0
14	MF	(Ghana) GHA	Yaw Yeboah	31	1	10+14	1	0+0	0	6+1	0	0+0	0	0+0	0
16	MF	(United States) USA	Taha Habroune	5	0	1+4	0	0+0	0	0+0	0	0+0	0	0+0	0
17	FW	(United States) USA	Christian Ramirez	36	10	16+9	8	1+0	1	1+3	0	4+1	1	1+0	0
18	DF	(Denmark) DEN	Malte Amundsen	43	2	26+5	1	0+0	0	1+5	0	2+3	0	1+0	1
19	FW	(Canada) CAN	Jacen Russell-Rowe	35	8	10+12	5	0+1	0	4+3	2	0+4	1	0+1	0
20	MF	(Romania) ROU	Alexandru Mățan	39	5	17+11	4	1+0	0	1+4	1	0+4	0	0+1	0
21	DF	(Ukraine) UKR	Yevhen Cheberko	39	1	17+8	1	2+0	0	7+0	0	3+2	0	0+0	0
22	GK	(Mexico) MEX	Abraham Romero	2	0	2+0	0	0+0	0	0+0	0	0+0	0	0+0	0
23	DF	(Algeria) ALG	Mohamed Farsi	40	4	21+6	4	2+0	0	5+0	0	4+1	0	1+0	0
24	GK	(United States) USA	Evan Bush	2	0	2+0	0	0+0	0	0+0	0	0+0	0	0+0	0
25	MF	(United States) USA	Sean Zawadzki	40	1	20+7	1	2+0	0	4+1	0	5+0	0	1+0	0
27	FW	(United States) USA	Maximilian Arfsten	41	5	23+8	4	1+0	1	0+3	0	5+0	0	1+0	0
28	GK	(United States) USA	Patrick Schulte	39	0	27+0	0	2+0	0	7+0	0	2+0	0	1+0	0
29	MF	(United States) USA	Cole Mrowka	1	0	0+1	0	0+0	0	0+0	0	0+0	0	0+0	0
31	DF	(Cape Verde) CPV	Steven Moreira	42	2	23+4	2	2+0	0	7+0	0	5+0	0	1+0	0
-	DF	(United States) USA	Keegan Hughes	0	0	0+0	0	0+0	0	0+0	0	0+0	0	0+0	0
			Own goal	-0	0	-	0	-	0	-	0	-	0	-	0
Players who left Columbus during the season:
2	DF	(United States) USA	Philip Quinton	1	0	1+0	0	0+0	0	0+0	0	0+0	0	0+0	0
8	MF	(United States) USA	Aidan Morris	22	3	15+1	2	0+0	0	5+1	1	0+0	0	0+0	0
30	MF	(United States) USA	Will Sands	7	0	2+4	0	0+0	0	0+1	0	0+0	0	0+0	0
41	GK	(Belarus) BLR	Stanislav Lapkes	0	0	0+0	0	0+0	0	0+0	0	0+0	0	0+0	0
42	MF	(United States) USA	Gio De Libera	0	0	0+0	0	0+0	0	0+0	0	0+0	0	0+0	0
45	MF	(United States) USA	Owen Presthus	0	0	0+0	0	0+0	0	0+0	0	0+0	0	0+0	0
47	FW	(United States) USA	Gibran Rayo	0	0	0+0	0	0+0	0	0+0	0	0+0	0	0+0	0
51	GK	(United States) USA	Cole Johnson	0	0	0+0	0	0+0	0	0+0	0	0+0	0	0+0	0

=== Disciplinary record ===
No.	Pos.	Name	MLS		MLS Cup Playoffs		CONCACAF Champions Cup		Leagues Cup		Campeones Cup		Total	
No.	Pos.	Name	Booked	Sent off (straight red)	Booked	Sent off (straight red)	Booked	Sent off (straight red)	Booked	Sent off (straight red)	Booked	Sent off (straight red)	Booked	Sent off (straight red)
1	GK	(United States) Nicholas Hagen	0	0	0	0	0	0	0	0	0	0	0	0
2	DF	(Argentina) Andrés Herrera	1	0	0	0	0	0	0	0	0	0	1	0
4	DF	(France) Rudy Camacho	4	0	0	0	0	0	1	0	0	0	5	0
5	MF	(United States) Derrick Jones	3	1	0	0	1	0	0	0	0	0	4	1
6	MF	(United States) Darlington Nagbe	2	0	0	0	1	0	0	0	0	0	3	0
7	MF	(France) Dylan Chambost	0	0	0	0	0	0	0	0	0	0	0	0
9	FW	(Colombia) Cucho Hernández	3	1	1	0	0	0	0	0	1	0	5	1
10	FW	(Uruguay) Diego Rossi	4	0	0	0	0	0	0	0	0	0	4	0
11	MF	(Colombia) Marino Hinestroza	0	1	0	0	0	0	0	0	0	0	0	1
12	DF	(United States) DeJuan Jones	0	0	0	0	0	0	0	0	0	0	0	0
13	MF	(Trinidad and Tobago) Aziel Jackson	0	0	0	0	0	0	0	0	0	0	0	0
14	MF	(Ghana) Yaw Yeboah	3	0	0	0	1	0	0	0	0	0	4	0
16	MF	(United States) Taha Habroune	1	0	0	0	0	0	0	0	0	0	1	0
17	FW	(United States) Christian Ramirez	0	0	0	0	0	0	0	0	0	0	0	0
18	DF	(Denmark) Malte Amundsen	7	0	0	0	0	0	0	0	0	0	7	0
19	FW	(United States) Jacen Russell-Rowe	0	0	0	0	0	0	0	0	0	0	0	0
20	MF	(Ghana) Alexandru Mățan	2	0	0	0	1	0	1	0	0	0	4	0
21	DF	(Ukraine) Yevhen Cheberko	4	0	0	0	0	0	0	0	0	0	4	0
22	GK	(Mexico) Abraham Romero	0	1	0	0	0	0	0	0	0	0	0	1
23	DF	(United States) Mohamed Farsi	0	0	0	0	0	0	0	0	0	0	0	0
24	GK	(United States) Evan Bush	1	0	0	0	0	0	0	0	0	0	1	0
25	MF	(United States) Sean Zawadzki	3	0	0	0	0	0	1	0	1	0	5	0
27	FW	(United States) Maximilian Arfsten	2	0	1	0	0	0	0	0	0	0	3	0
28	GK	(United States) Patrick Schulte	3	0	0	0	0	0	0	0	0	0	3	0
29	MF	(United States) Cole Mrowka	0	0	0	0	0	0	0	0	0	0	0	0
31	DF	(Cape Verde) Steven Moreira	0	0	0	0	1	0	0	0	0	0	1	0
-	DF	(United States) Keegan Hughes	0	0	0	0	0	0	0	0	0	0	0	0
Players who left Columbus during the season:
2	DF	(United States) Philip Quinton	1	0	0	0	0	0	0	0	0	0	1	0
8	MF	(United States) Aidan Morris	0	0	0	0	2	1	0	0	0	0	2	1
30	MF	(United States) Will Sands	0	0	0	0	0	0	0	0	0	0	0	0
41	GK	(United States) Stanislav Lapkes	0	0	0	0	0	0	0	0	0	0	0	0
42	MF	(United States) Gio De Libera	0	0	0	0	0	0	0	0	0	0	0	0
45	MF	(United States) Owen Presthus	0	0	0	0	0	0	0	0	0	0	0	0
47	FW	(United States) Gibran Rayo	0	0	0	0	0	0	0	0	0	0	0	0
51	GK	(United States) Cole Johnson	0	0	0	0	0	0	0	0	0	0	0	0

=== Clean sheets ===
No.	Name	MLS	MLS Cup Playoffs	CONCACAF Champions Cup	Leagues Cup	Campeones Cup	Total	Games Played
1	(Guatemala) Nicholas Hagen	1	0	0	1	0	2	7
22	(Mexico) Abraham Romero	1	0	0	0	0	1	0
24	(United States) Evan Bush	0	0	0	0	0	0	2
25	(United States) Sean Zawadzki	0	0	0	0	0	0	1
28	(United States) Patrick Schulte	10	0	1	0	0	11	39
Players who left Columbus during the season:
41	(Belarus) Stanislav Lapkes	0	0	0	0	0	0	0
51	(United States) Cole Johnson	0	0	0	0	0	0	0

== Transfers ==
=== In ===
Pos.	Player	Transferred from	Fee/notes	Date	Source
MF	(Morocco) (United States) Taha Habroune	(United States) Columbus Crew 2	Homegrown player, contract runs through 2027 with an option for 2028	January 17, 2024	
MF	(United States) Cole Mrowka	(United States) Columbus Crew 2	Homegrown player, contract runs through 2026 with options for 2027 and 2028	March 5, 2024	
MF	(France) Dylan Chambost	(France) AS Saint-Étienne	Transfer, contract runs through 2026 with an option for 2027	June 11, 2024	
MF	(United States) Aziel Jackson	(United States) St. Louis CITY SC	Trade, $650,000 in General Allocation Money plus additional GAM if certain performance metrics are met	June 18, 2024	
DF	(United States) DeJuan Jones	(United States) New England Revolution	Trade, Will Sands + $600,000 in General Allocation Money	July 31, 2024	
GK	(Mexico) Abraham Romero	(United States) Los Angeles FC	Trade, $50,000 in General Allocation Money	August 14, 2024	
GK	(United States) Evan Bush	(United States) Columbus Crew	Signed a new contract for the 2025 season	December 17, 2024	

=== Loan in ===
Pos.	Player	Parent club	Length/Notes	Beginning	End	Source
GK	(Belarus) Stanislav Lapkes	(United States) Columbus Crew 2	Short term agreements	March 23, 2024	March 23, 2024	
GK	(Belarus) Stanislav Lapkes	(United States) Columbus Crew 2	Short term agreements	April 24, 2024	April 24, 2024	
GK	(Belarus) Stanislav Lapkes	(United States) Columbus Crew 2	Short term agreements	June 14, 2024	June 14, 2024	
GK	(Belarus) Stanislav Lapkes	(United States) Columbus Crew 2	Short term agreements	October 12, 2024	October 12, 2024	
MF	(United States) Gio De Libera	(United States) Columbus Crew 2	Short term agreements	March 23, 2024	March 23, 2024	
MF	(United States) Gio De Libera	(United States) Columbus Crew 2	Short term agreements	April 2, 2024	April 2, 2024	
GK	(United States) Cole Johnson	(United States) Columbus Crew 2	Short term agreements	May 1, 2024	May 1, 2024	
GK	(United States) Cole Johnson	(United States) Columbus Crew 2	Short term agreements	June 1, 2024	June 1, 2024	
GK	(United States) Cole Johnson	(United States) Columbus Crew 2	Short term agreements	July 17, 2024	July 17, 2024	
GK	(United States) Cole Johnson	(United States) Columbus Crew 2	Short term agreements	July 20, 2024	July 20, 2024	
DF	(Argentina) Andrés Herrera	(Argentina) River Plate	Loan through June 30, 2024 with option to purchase	August 6, 2024	June 30, 2025	
MF	(United States) Owen Presthus	(United States) Columbus Crew 2	Short term agreement	September 7, 2024	September 7, 2024	
FW	(United States) Gibran Rayo	(United States) Columbus Crew 2	Short term agreement	September 7, 2024	September 7, 2024	

=== Out ===
Pos.	Player	Transferred to	Fee/notes	Date	Source
FW	(Trinidad and Tobago) Kevin Molino	(Trinidad and Tobago) Defence Force F.C.	Mutual termination	February 2, 2024	
DF	(United States) Philip Quinton	(United States) Real Salt Lake	Trade, $200,000 in General Allocation Money	April 19, 2024	
MF	(United States) Aidan Morris	(England) Middlesbrough F.C.	Transfer, $4,000,000. Columbus retains a percentage of any future transfer fees.	June 28, 2024	
DF	(United States) Will Sands	(United States) New England Revolution	Trade for DeJuan Jones	July 31, 2024	
DF	(United States) Keegan Hughes	(United States) New England Revolution II	Option declined	November 27, 2024	
MF	(Ghana) Yaw Yeboah	(United States) Los Angeles FC	Option declined	November 27, 2024	
MF	(Romania) Alexandru Mățan	(United Arab Emirates) Dibba Al-Hisn SC	Contract expired	November 27, 2024	
GK	(United States) Evan Bush	(United States) Columbus Crew	Contract expired	November 27, 2024	

=== Loans out ===
Pos.	Player	Loanee club	Length/Notes	Beginning	End	Source
DF	(United States) Keegan Hughes	(United States) Loudoun United FC	Columbus has right to recall at any point, subject to MLS roster compliance	February 23, 2024	October 26, 2024	
MF	(United States) Cole Mrowka	(United States) Columbus Crew 2	First team loan to affiliate	March 17, 2024	August 18, 2024	
GK	(Guatemala) Nicholas Hagen	(United States) Columbus Crew 2	First team loan to affiliate	March 17, 2024	March 17, 2024	
DF	(United States) Philip Quinton	(United States) Columbus Crew 2	First team loan to affiliate	March 17, 2024	March 17, 2024	
MF	(United States) Will Sands	(United States) Columbus Crew 2	First team loan to affiliate	March 17, 2024	March 17, 2024	
MF	(United States) Taha Habroune	(United States) Columbus Crew 2	First team loan to affiliate	May 5, 2024	November 2, 2024	
FW	(United States) Aziel Jackson	(United States) Columbus Crew 2	First team loan to affiliate	July 14, 2024	July 14, 2024	
MF	(United States) Cole Mrowka	(United States) Colorado Springs Switchbacks	Columbus has right to recall at any point, subject to MLS roster compliance	August 23, 2024	November 23, 2024	
MF	(Colombia) Marino Hinestroza	(Colombia) Atletico Nacional	Columbus has right to recall following the 2024 MLS season, subject to MLS roster compliance	July 26, 2024	January 27, 2025	
GK	(Mexico) Abraham Romero	(United States) Columbus Crew 2	First team loan to affiliate	September 22, 2024	September 22, 2024	

=== MLS SuperDraft picks ===
Draft picks are not automatically signed to the team roster. Only those who are signed to a contract will be listed as transfers in. The picks for the Columbus Crew are listed below:

2024 Columbus Crew SuperDraft Picks
Round	Pick	Player	Position	College
1	29	(United States) Jayden Da	FW	Duquesne
2	58	(United States) Zach Zengue	MF	Georgetown
3	87	(United States) Luke Pruter	GK	UC Irvine

== Awards ==
MLS Team of the Matchday
Matchday	Starters	Bench	Opponent(s)	Link
1+2		(United States) Aidan Morris	(United States) Atlanta United FC	
3		(Colombia) Cucho Hernández	(United States) Minnesota United FC	
4	(Algeria) Mohamed Farsi	(Canada) Jacen Russell-Rowe	(United States) Chicago Fire FC	
5	(United States) Aidan Morris (Colombia) Cucho Hernández		(United States) New York Red Bulls	
7		(Colombia) Marino Hinestroza	(United States) Nashville SC	
8		(United States) Aidan Morris	(United States) D.C. United	
9		(Denmark) Malte Amundsen	(United States) Real Salt Lake	
10	(Cape Verde) Steven Moreira		(United States) Portland Timbers	
14	(Algeria) Mohamed Farsi	(United States) Maximilian Arfsten	(Canada) CF Montréal	
15	(France) Rudy Camacho		(United States) Chicago Fire FC	
16	(Uruguay) Diego Rossi	(United States) Aidan Morris	(United States) Orlando City SC	
20	(Algeria) Mohamed Farsi	(Colombia) Cucho Hernández	(United States) New York City FC	
22	(Colombia) Cucho Hernández	(United States) Aidan Morris	(United States) Sporting Kansas City	
23	(France) Rudy Camacho (Uruguay) Diego Rossi (Colombia) Cucho Hernández	(Canada) Jacen Russell-Rowe	(United States) New England Revolution	
24		(Uruguay) Diego Rossi	(United States) Nashville SC	
25	(Algeria) Mohamed Farsi	(Uruguay) Diego Rossi (Colombia) Cucho Hernández	(Canada) Toronto FC	
26	(United States) Maximilian Arfsten (United States) Christian Ramirez (Colombia) Cucho Hernández (France) Wilfried Nancy (Coach)	(United States) Darlington Nagbe	(United States) Los Angeles FC	
30	(Uruguay) Diego Rossi	(United States) DeJuan Jones	(United States) New York City FC	
33	(Argentina) Andrés Herrera	(Colombia) Cucho Hernández	(Canada) Toronto FC	
34	(United States) Maximilian Arfsten	(Colombia) Cucho Hernández	(United States) Orlando City SC	
35		(Colombia) Cucho Hernández	(United States) D.C. United	
37	(Algeria) Mohamed Farsi (Colombia) Cucho Hernández	(France) Dylan Chambost	(United States) Philadelphia Union	
38	(Denmark) Malte Amundsen	(United States) Aziel Jackson	(United States) New York Red Bulls	

=== MLS Player of the Matchday ===
Week	Player	Opponent	Link
22	(Colombia) Cucho Hernández	Sporting Kansas City	
37	(Colombia) Cucho Hernández	Philadelphia Union	

=== MLS Goal of the Matchday ===
Week	Player	Opponent	Link
23	(United States) Maximilian Arfsten	New England Revolution	
26	(Colombia) Cucho Hernández	Los Angeles FC	

=== MLS Player of the Month ===
Month	Player	Stats	Link
July	(Colombia) Cucho Hernández	3 goals, 4 assists	

=== 2024 MLS All-Star Game ===
Starters

- FW Cucho Hernández
- FW Diego Rossi

Reserves

- DF Rudy Camacho
- DF Steven Moreira
- MF Darlington Nagbe

=== 2024 MLS Next All-Star Game ===
- FW Chase Adams
- MF Tristan Brown

=== Postseason ===
2024 CONCACAF Champions Cup Best Goalkeeper Award

- GK Patrick Schulte

2024 CONCACAF Champions Cup Fair Play Award
MLS Defender of the Year Award

- DF Steven Moreira

Sigi Schmid Coach of the Year Award

- Wilfried Nancy

Audi Goals Drive Progress Impact Award

- MF Darlington Nagbe

MLS Best XI

- DF Steven Moreira
- FW Cucho Hernández

Communications Club of the Year

=== Crew Team Awards ===
- Most Valuable Player – Cucho Hernández
- Golden Boot Winner – Cucho Hernández
- Defender of the Year – Steven Moreira
- Kirk Urso Heart Award – Evan Bush
- Humanitarian of the Year – Darlington Nagbe
- Academy Player of the Year – Chase Adams
