= Abraham Romero =

Mexican footballer (born 1998)

Personal information
- Full name: Abraham Isaí Romero González
- Date of birth: 18 February 1998 (age 28)
- Place of birth: Pasadena, California, U.S.
- Height: 1.88 m (6 ft 2 in)
- Position: Goalkeeper

Team information
- Current team: El Paso Locomotive
- Number: 99

Youth career
- 2006–2012: Los Angeles Futbol Club Chelsea
- 2012–2016: LA Galaxy
- 2016–2017: Pachuca

Senior career*
| Years | Team | Apps | (Gls) |
| 2017–2019 | Pachuca | 0 | (0) |
| 2019–2020 | LA Galaxy II | 19 | (0) |
| 2021 | Orange County | 9 | (0) |
| 2022 | Las Vegas Lights | 21 | (0) |
| 2023–2024 | Los Angeles FC | 0 | (0) |
| 2023–2024 | → Los Angeles FC 2 (loan) | 21 | (0) |
| 2024–2025 | Columbus Crew | 2 | (0) |
| 2024–2025 | → Columbus Crew 2 (loan) | 2 | (0) |
| 2025 | → Colorado Springs Switchbacks (loan) | 5 | (0) |
| 2026– | El Paso Locomotive | 20 | (0) |

International career^{‡}
| 2012 | United States U15 | 2 | (0) |
| 2015 | Mexico U17 | 7 | (0) |
| 2017 | Mexico U20 | 5 | (0) |
| 2018–2019 | Mexico U21 | 2 | (0) |
Medal record
Men's football
Representing Mexico
Toulon Tournament
| Runner-up | 2018 France | Team |
CONCACAF Under-17 Championship
| First place | 2015 Honduras | Team |
- * Club domestic league appearances and goals as of 21:08, 8 November 2026 (UTC) ‡ National team caps and goals as of 13 May 2019

Abraham Isaí Romero González (born 18 February 1998) is a professional footballer who plays for USL Championship side El Paso Locomotive FC. Born in the United States, he represented the Mexico national under-21 team.

== Career ==
Romero began his youth career playing for Los Angeles Futbol Club Chelsea, before joining the academy of the LA Galaxy in 2012. He left in 2016 to play for Pachuca's U20 team, and left the team three years later without making a first team appearance. He then joined LA Galaxy's second team in 2019 in the USL Championship. After two seasons at Los Dos, he moved to Orange County SC in 2021 and won the USL Championship Cup in his lone season with the club. For the 2022 season he signed with Las Vegas Lights, the second team for Los Angeles FC. Romero signed directly to the Los Angeles FC first team the following season, but made appearances strictly with their newly created second team, LAFC 2.

During the 2024 season for LAFC, Romero appeared in three total games, two in the U.S. Open Cup and once in Leagues Cup. On 14 August 2024, he was traded to the Columbus Crew in exchange for $50,000 of General Allocation Money. He made his league debut on 7 September against Seattle Sounders FC due to the absences of Patrick Schulte and Nicholas Hagen, who were both called up to their national teams. Romero was sent off with a red card near the end of the first half for a foul outside the box and was replaced in goal by midfielder Sean Zawadzki due to the lack of a backup goalkeeper on the bench.

At the start of the 2025 season, Romero was given a short-term loan to the Colorado Springs Switchbacks in the USL Championship, with the loan set to expire on 31 May 2025. During a match on 3 May, he received a red card for handling the ball outside of the box. That match would be his last appearance for the Switchbacks, as his parent club would recall him on 21 May. On 31 December 2025, Romero's contract expired with Columbus Crew.

In February 2026, Romero signed a contract with USL Championship club El Paso Locomotive FC.

== International career ==
=== Youth ===
Having represented the United States U15 team twice, Romero originally stated that he opted to play for Mexico because he felt criticized for being Latino. "I played for the United States from the age of 12 to 16... 15 and a half years, and I didn't like being with them anymore because I felt very isolated, I felt like the outsider. The players judged me for having more Latin, more Mexican habits." However, he later backtracked those claims and said it was due to his own immaturity and not being the undisputed starter for the United States.

Romero was called up for the 2017 FIFA U-20 World Cup, and was included in the under-21 roster that participated in the 2018 Toulon Tournament, where Mexico would finish runners-up. He also appeared at the 2018 Central American and Caribbean Games, receiving a red card in the 49th minute in a match versus El Salvador.

== Honours ==
Orange County SC

- USL Cup: 2021

Columbus Crew

- Leagues Cup: 2024

Mexico U17

- CONCACAF U-17 Championship: 2015
