= Columbus Crew Academy =

American soccer team

- Full name: Columbus Crew Academy
- Founded: 2006; 20 years ago as Crew Soccer Academy
- Stadium: Historic Crew Stadium; 1 Black and Gold Blvd; Columbus, OH
- Coordinates: 40°0′34″N 82°59′28″W
- Head of Coaching and Individual Development: Dan Lock
- Head coach: U18: Chris Rogers; U16: Shahad Farahani; U15: Eddie Hertsenberg
- League: MLS Next
- Website: www.columbuscrew.com/academy/

Columbus Crew Academy is the youth academy and development system of American Major League Soccer club Columbus Crew, which competes in MLS Next.

The academy plays in the U15, U16 and U18 divisions in MLS Next and also includes pre-formation teams from the ages of U10-U14 that play in friendlies and tournaments throughout the year.

== History ==
The Columbus Crew academy were founded in 2006. They joined U.S. Soccer Development Academy as a founding member in 2007. They fielded U15/U16 and U17/U18 teams in this league until the 2016-17 season. In the 2017-18 season these age groups were replaced with U16/U17 and U18/U19 teams.

U.S. Soccer Development Academy folded in 2020 and the academy teams moved to the newly founded league, MLS Next, where they entered U14, U15, U17 and U19 teams.

In Fall of 2023, Columbus Crew Academy entered a team into the United Premier Soccer League. They played one season and finished the season by winning the Ohio/Indy Conference, East Region and finishing 3rd place in the national playoffs.

For the 2024-25 season, the age groups participating in MLS Next changed to U15, U16 and U18.

== OhioHealth Performance Center ==
The OhioHealth Performance Center opened in 2021 on the site of Historic Crew Stadium. The Crew moved their training facility from Obetz, OH during the 2021 season with the development of Lower.com Field. The facility includes 3.5 natural grass fields, plus a turf field at Historic Crew Stadium which can support a seasonal bubble during the winter months.

== Technical staff ==
Position	Staff
Head of Coaching and Individual Development	(England) Dan Lock
U18 Head Coach	(Wales) Chris Rogers
U16 Head Coach	(Iran) Shahad Farahani
U15 Head Coach	(United States) Eddie Hertsenberg
U13/U14 Academy Manager - Pre-Formation	(England) Ross Gibson
U11/12 Lead Coach, Crew Youth Program Lead	(United States) Will Havanas
Academy Goalkeeper Coach	(United States) David Winner
Academy Goalkeeper Coach	(United States) Sam Keener
Academy Assistant Coach	(United States) Saad Abdul-Salaam
Academy Assistant Coach	(United States) DJ Ogunlade
Assistant Academy Coach	(Spain) Daniel Suarez
U11/U12 Assistant Coach	(Wales) Matthew Young
Manager of Performance, Player Development	(United States) Dean Tetley
Academy Performance Coach	(United States) Dominic Sanguinette
Academy Performance Coach	(United States) Sam Murray
Academy Athletic Trainer	(United States) Shelby Stimmel
Academy Athletic Trainer	(United States) Elissia Willis
Manager, Academy Scouting and Recruiting	(United States) Erik Alves
Head Academy Scout	(United States) Rafael Calderon
Head Local Scout	(England) Callum Morris
Manager, Academy Operations	(United States) Kellianne Venit
Manager, Education	(United States) Bryce Phillips
Education and Homestay Coordinator	(United States) Angie Herrell
Academy Equipment Manager	(United States) Scott Newman
Equipment Assistant	(United States) Adriana Zorrilla

Source: []

== Academy graduates ==
The following players have joined the Columbus Crew first team on homegrown player contracts after having previously been a Columbus Crew Academy player (players in bold are currently part of the team) (as of March 8, 2026):

- (United States) Aaron Horton (2011)
- (United States) Matt Lampson (2011)
- (United States) Ben Speas (2012)
- (United States) Wil Trapp (2012)
- (United States) Chad Barson (2013)
- (United States) Kyle Hyland (2013)
- (United States) Matt Wiet (2013)
- (United States) Ross Friedman (2014)
- (United States) Matt Walker (2014)
- (United States) Ben Swanson (2014)
- (United States) Alex Crognale (2016)
- (United States) Aboubacar Keita (2019)
- (United States) Aidan Morris (2020)
- (United States) Sebastian Berhalter (2020)
- (United States) Isaiah Parente (2021)
- (United States) **Sean Zawadzki** (2022)
- (United States) Keegan Hughes (2023)
- (United States) **Taha Habroune** (2024)
- (Philippines) **Cole Mrowka** (2024)
- (Belarus) **Stanislav Lapkes** (2025)
- (United States) **Tristan Brown** (2025)
- (United States) **Owen Presthus** (2026)
- (United States) **Chase Adams** (2026)
- (United States) **Quinton Elliot** (2026)

The following players have signed for the Columbus Crew first team on short-term loan contracts for MLS, U.S. Open Cup, CONCACAF Champions Cup, or Leagues Cup matches (players in bold are currently Columbus Crew 2 players), after having been a Columbus Crew Academy player, but did not sign a full-time contract (as of March 8, 2026):

- (United States) **Gio De Libera** (2024)

The following players have signed professional contracts for Columbus Crew 2. (players in bold are currently Columbus Crew 2 players), after having been a Columbus Crew Academy player, but have never signed a first-team contract or short-term loan. (as of May 10, 2025):

- (United States) Aidan Wolf (2022)
- (Jamaica) Zion Scarlett (2022)
- (Colombia) **Nicolás Rincón** (2024)
- (United States) **Chris Rogers** (2024)
- (United States) **Anthony Alaouieh** (2024)
- (United States) **Brent Adu-Gyamfi** (2024)

The following players signed contracts with other teams in Major League Soccer, after previously being a Columbus Crew Academy player:

- (United States) Tyler Wolff (2020)
- (United States) Owen Wolff (2021)
- (Colombia) Juan Castilla (2021)
- (United States) Parker Siegfried (2021)
- (United States) Emeka Eneli (2023)
- (United States) Samuel Sarver (2025)

== Honors ==
- U-19 McGuire Cup National Champions (2): 2010, 2012
- USL Super-20 National Champions (2): 2010, 2011
- UPSL Ohio/Indy Conference Champions: Fall 2023
- UPSL East Region Champions: Fall 2023
- MLS NEXT U19 Champions: 2025–26

== See also ==
- Columbus Crew 2
