= Marino Hinestroza =

Colombian footballer (born 2002)

Personal information
- Full name: Marino Hinestroza Angulo
- Date of birth: 8 July 2002 (age 24)
- Place of birth: Cali, Colombia
- Height: 1.70 m (5 ft 7 in)
- Position: Winger

Team information
- Current team: Vasco da Gama
- Number: 18

Senior career*
Years	Team	Apps	(Gls)
2018–2019	Orsomarso	1	(0)
2019–2022	América de Cali	0	(0)
2020–2022	→ Palmeiras (loan)	0	(0)
2022–2023	Pachuca	42	(2)
2024	Columbus Crew	16	(2)
2024	→ Atlético Nacional (loan)	22	(3)
2025–2026	Atlético Nacional	40	(6)
2026–	Vasco da Gama	4	(0)

International career^{‡}
2019	Colombia U18	1	(0)
2025–	Colombia	2	(0)
- * Club domestic league appearances and goals as of 20:49, 30 March 2026 (UTC) ‡ National team caps and goals as of 20:49, 30 March 2026 (UTC)

Marino Hinestroza Angulo (born 8 July 2002) is a Colombian professional footballer who plays as a winger for Campeonato Brasileiro Série A club Vasco da Gama, and the Colombia national team.

== Club career ==
Hinestroza was born in Cali, Colombia and was trained at Orsomarso and made his debut in the Categoría Primera B for the club before joining América de Cali in 2019. He made his professional debut with the club on 8 May 2019, in a Copa Colombia match against Universitario Popayán. He came on as a substitute, and his team won 2–1.

On 19 February 2020, Hinestroza moved to Brazil to join Palmeiras on loan with an option to buy. He was placed into the club's under-20 team and left Brazil without making a single first-team appearance.

Hinestroza refused to extend his contract with América de Cali and left on a free transfer in the summer of 2022, joining C.F. Pachuca on 7 June 2022. He later claimed the club had been unwilling to meet his salary demands despite paying other players more. Hinestroza played his first match for Pachuca on 5 July 2022, in a league match against Querétaro, coming on as a substitute. On 13 March 2023, in a match against Monterrey, Marino scored his first goal for Pachuca.

On 22 December 2023, Hinestroza moved to Major League Soccer club Columbus Crew, signing a contract until the end of the 2026 season with an option to extend until the 2027 season. He scored his first goal for the Columbus Crew on 30 March 2024 in a 2–2 draw vs Nashville SC. On 13 July 2024, Hinestroza was issued a red card in the 90+7 minute for violent conduct vs Los Angeles FC, and never appeared for Columbus again as he was loaned out to Atlético Nacional until the end of the Major League Soccer season.

=== Atlético Nacional ===
He made his debut for Atlético Nacional on 30 July 2024, coming on as a substitute in a 1–0 loss to La Equidad. Hinestroza scored his first goal for the club in a 2–0 win over Atlético Junior. After his goal, Hinestroza put his hands behind his back, mimicking a shark (the nickname of Atlético Junior), and with his hands, mimed as if he were fishing. The game was later abandoned because fights broke out in the crowd. During his initial loan spell, he won two pieces of silverware, winning the Colombian Primera A title, and lifting the 2024 Copa Colombia, where he scored in the first leg of the final against América de Cali.

Hinestroza was transferred to Atlético Nacional on a permanent deal in January 2025. On 6 February, he converted the decisive penalty in the Superliga Colombiana, securing another title for the club. He scored twice on 4 March against Fortaleza C.E.I.F., and repeated the feat on 26 October against Independiente Medellín. Despite his contributions, Atlético Nacional failed to win either phase of the domestic league. He did, however, win the 2025 Copa Colombia, as Atlético Nacional defeated Independiente Medellín 1–0 on aggregate.

In the Copa Libertadores, Hinestroza made an immediate impact, scoring on his debut against Nacional while also providing two assists in a 3–0 victory. He added another assist in a 3–1 win over Internacional during the group stage. The club was later eliminated in the Round of 16 by São Paulo, with Hinestroza missing the decisive penalty in the shootout.

=== Vasco da Gama ===
In January 2026, Hinestroza was officially announced as a Vasco da Gama player, with the club paying approximately $5 million for 80% of his economic rights. Before the transfer, there was much talk about his potential move to Boca Juniors. He confirmed that he had everything agreed with Boca, but this was until Vasco da Gama entered the picture and changed the course of the negotiations. "I was always firm in my decision to go to Boca Juniors, then Vasco came along, and it no longer depended on me. [...] I'm very happy about this step in my career."

== International career ==
Hinestroza has represented the Colombian national team at the under-18 level.

== Career statistics ==
=== Club ===
As of 30 August 2025

Appearances and goals by club, season and competition
Club	Season	League			Cup		Continental		Other		Total	
Club	Season	Division	Apps	Goals	Apps	Goals	Apps	Goals	Apps	Goals	Apps	Goals
Orsomarso	2018	Categoría Primera B	1	0	0	0	—		0	0	1	0
América de Cali	2019	Categoría Primera A	0	0	1 (Note: Appearances in Copa Colombia)	0	—		0	0	1	0
América de Cali	2020	Categoría Primera A	0	0	0	0	—		0	0	0	0
América de Cali	2021	Categoría Primera A	0	0	0	0	—		0	0	0	0
América de Cali	Total		0	0	1	0	0	0	0	0	1	0
Palmeiras (loan)	2020	Série A	0	0	0	0	0	0	0	0	0	0
Palmeiras (loan)	2021	Série A	0	0	0	0	0	0	0	0	0	0
Palmeiras (loan)	Total		0	0	0	0	0	0	0	0	0	0
Pachuca	2022–23	Liga MX	29	0	0	0	2 (Note: Appearances in CONCACAF Champions Cup)	0	—		31	0
Pachuca	2023–24	Liga MX	13	1	0	0	—		2 (Note: Appearance in Campeón de Campeones and Leagues Cup)	0	15	1
Pachuca	Total		42	1	0	0	2	0	2	0	46	1
Columbus Crew	2024	Major League Soccer	16	2	0	0	6	0	—		22	2
Atlético Nacional	2024	Categoría Primera A	22	3	6	1	—		—		28	4
Atlético Nacional	2025	Categoría Primera A	26	4	2	0	7 (Note: Appearances in Copa Libertadores)	1	1 (Note: Appearance in Superliga Colombiana)	0	36	5
Atlético Nacional	Total		48	7	8	1	7	1	1	0	64	9
Career total			107	10	9	1	15	0	3	0	134	12

=== International ===
As of match played 4 September 2025

National team	Year	Apps	Goals
Colombia	2025	2	0
Total		2	0

== Honours ==
Pachuca

- Liga MX: Apertura 2022

Columbus Crew

- CONCACAF Champions Cup runner-up: 2024

Atlético Nacional

- Categoría Primera A : 2024 Finalización
- Copa Colombia: 2024
