= Sean Zawadzki =

American soccer player (born 2000)

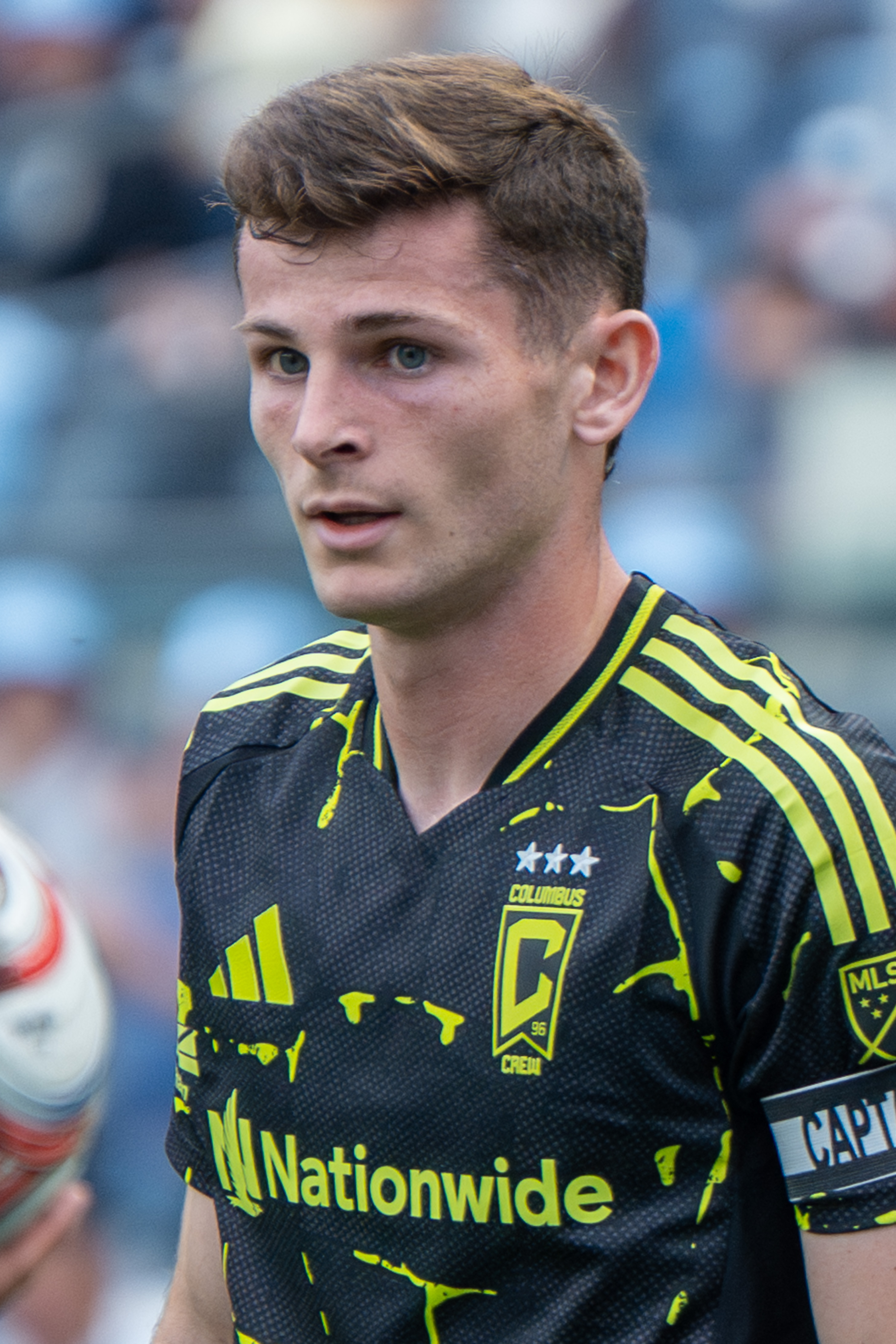
- Zawadzki with the Columbus Crew in 2026

Personal information
- Full name: Sean Gregory Zawadzki
- Date of birth: April 21, 2000 (age 26)
- Place of birth: Olmsted Falls, Ohio, U.S.
- Height: 6 ft 0 in (1.83 m)
- Positions: Midfielder; center-back

Team information
- Current team: Columbus Crew
- Number: 25

Youth career
- –2015: Team Challenger FC
- 2015–2018: Columbus Crew

College career
Years	Team	Apps	(Gls)
2018–2021	Georgetown Hoyas	78	(4)

Senior career*
Years	Team	Apps	(Gls)
2019	Long Island Rough Riders	10	(2)
2022–	Columbus Crew	123	(8)
2022–2023	Columbus Crew 2	19	(1)

International career^{‡}
2024	United States	1	(0)
- * Club domestic league appearances and goals as of 13:29, 8 November 2026 (UTC) ‡ National team caps and goals as of January 20, 2024

Sean Gregory Zawadzki (born April 21, 2000) is an American professional soccer player who plays as a midfielder or defender and is the captain of Major League Soccer club Columbus Crew.

Zawadzki began his career with youth club Team Challenger FC, before moving to the academy of the Columbus Crew, the team he grew up supporting. He did not immediately sign a professional contract with the club, and instead pursued a college career with the Georgetown Hoyas in Washington D.C. While playing for the Hoyas, Zawadzki won two Big East Conference tournaments, three Big East regular season championships, an NCAA national championship, as well as several individual accolades.

After his college career, he was signed by the Columbus Crew in 2022 and spent much of that year with the reserves. In 2023, He became a mainstay in the starting lineup after a midseason position change to center-back, winning the MLS Cup in 2023 and the Leagues Cup in 2024. In 2026, he was announced as captain for the Crew.

== Early career ==
A youth product of Team Challenger FC, Zawadzki played on the same team as future Columbus Crew teammate Isaiah Parente. Zawadzki was also part of the Columbus Crew Academy between 2015 and 2018, serving as captain for his final two years. Zawadzki played college soccer at Georgetown from 2018 to 2021. During his time with the Hoyas, he made 78 total appearances and scored 4 goals, winning the 2019 NCAA national championship, two Big East Conference tournaments, and three Big East regular season championships. Head coach Brian Wiese called him "the most important player on the 2019 national championship team." For his efforts in the 2019 season, he was awarded the team's most valuable player award. During his junior and senior seasons, he captained the squad and won the Big East Defensive Player of the Year in 2021, and received his second team most valuable player award.

Zawadzki played for the Long Island Rough Riders of USL League Two in 2019, playing in 10 games and scoring 2 goals.

== Professional career ==
=== Columbus Crew ===
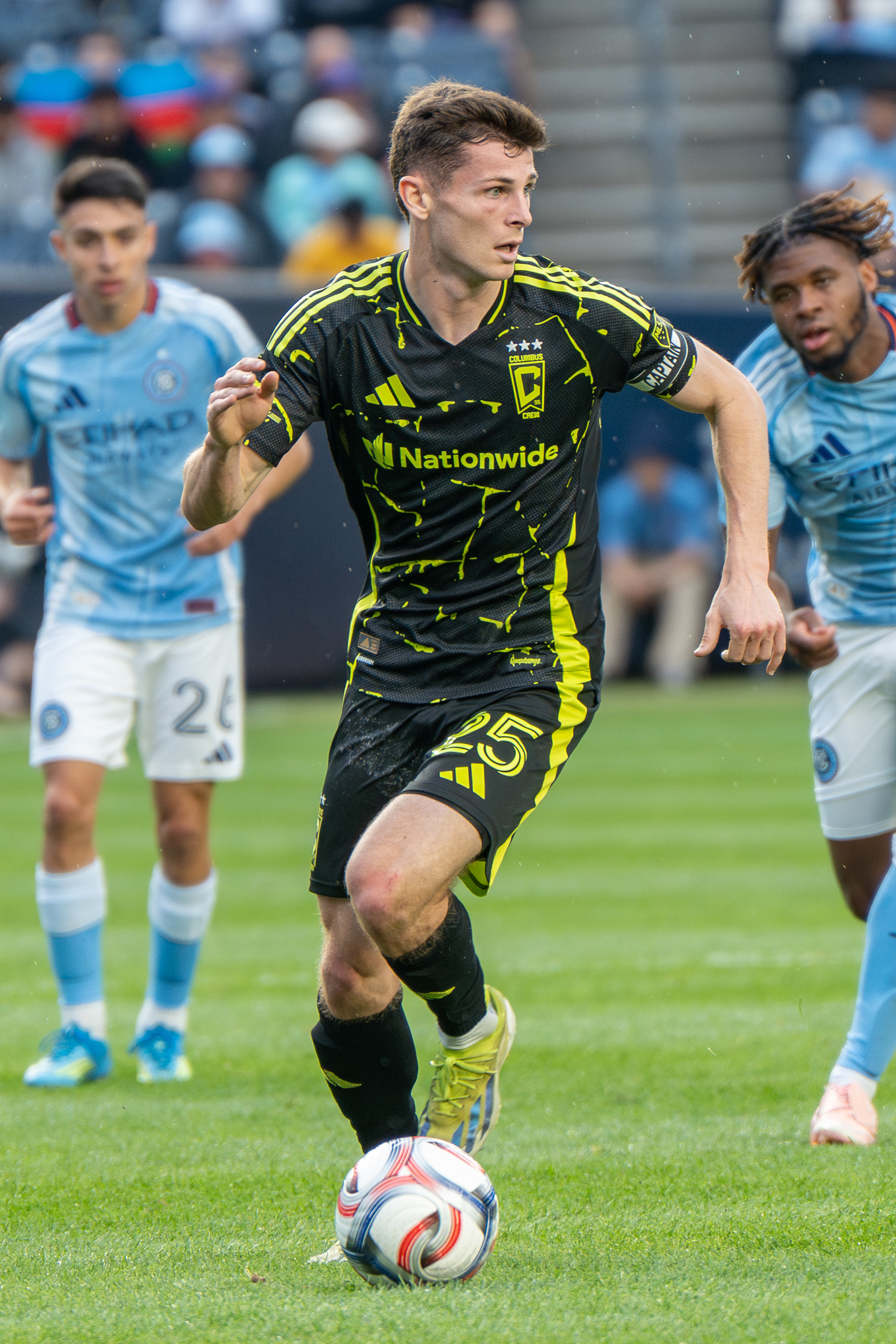
Sean Zawadzki with the Columbus Crew in 2026

==== 2022 season ====
On January 13, 2022, Zawadzki was announced as a homegrown player signing by the Columbus Crew, and played the majority of his first season with the reserve team, helping them win the inaugural league championship. Zawadzki made his first-team debut on June 25, 2022, starting in a 0–0 draw against Real Salt Lake and playing the full 90 minutes. Four days later, he started the next match against Toronto FC and scored his first professional goal in a 2–1 win. Zawadzki would go on to make five appearances with four starts for the first team in 2022.

==== 2023 season ====
At the beginning of the 2023 season, Zawadzki played sparingly, appearing as a substitute in six of the club's first eight games. He scored in second-half stoppage time against the New England Revolution to secure a 1–1 draw for Columbus. After going through a midseason position change to center-back due to injuries, Zawadzki would then appear in all but one of the club's remaining games while rotating between midfield and center-back, scoring in a 5–1 win versus Loudoun United FC in the U.S. Open Cup, a 3–2 win versus the Colorado Rapids, and another second-half stoppage time equalizer, this time against New York City FC. He appeared in all six postseason matches for Columbus, beating Los Angeles FC in the MLS Cup final.

==== 2024 season ====
During preseason, Zawadzki signed a contract extension through 2027, stating, “It’s an amazing feeling to have signed my second contract with the Crew. It’s the team I’ve supported my whole life, and from a young age, the team I grew up playing for.” He scored his first goal of the season on March 30th, a header from a set-piece against Nashville SC in a 2–2 draw, a game he would not finish, as he was subbed off at halftime due to a head injury sustained just prior to the end of the first half. On August 28, Zawadzki was named captain for the first time for Columbus in a 1–0 away win versus the Philadelphia Union. During the Leagues Cup, He started all five matches in the tournament, defeating Los Angeles FC in the final. During a match against Seattle Sounders FC on September 7, goalkeeper Abraham Romero was sent off and Zawadzki replaced in him goal due to the lack of another goalkeeper on the matchday roster. Zawadzki played for more than 45 minutes and made two saves in the 4–0 loss. On September 25, he suffered a rib injury during the Campeones Cup versus Club América, causing him to miss the next five league games. He returned to action in the final game of the regular season, coming on as a second-half substitute.

==== 2025 season ====
Zawadzki notched his first goal in 2025 for the Crew on April 26, scoring the first goal in a 2–1 win at home against the San Jose Earthquakes. He would score again two weeks later in the dying moments of the match to rescue a 2–2 draw for the Crew against the Philadelphia Union. Zawadzki missed time on two occasions throughout the season due to knee injuries, but was still able to make 35 appearances across all competitions.

==== 2026 season ====
Following the retirement of Darlington Nagbe after the 2025 season, Zawadzki was named captain of the Crew. He was also rewarded with a contract extension until 2030.

== International career ==
Zawadzki made his debut for the senior United States national team on January 20, 2024, in a friendly against Slovenia. During his 2025 club season, he was called up on three different occasions, but was forced to withdraw for all three due to injury before making any appearances.

== Style of play ==
Described as a "Swiss Army knife" due to his versatility, Zawadzki has been praised by coaches for his attitude, work rate, leadership, and passing range. Zawadzki commented on his own playstyle: "I’m someone who’s going to connect with the ball. I’m not someone who gets forward very often, but when it’s needed, I will. And someone who’s going to do whatever is needed, do some dirty work, if possible, try and break up tackles and do that stuff too.”

== Personal life ==
Born in the United States, Zawadzki is of Polish descent.

== Career statistics ==
=== Club ===
As of match played March 23, 2025

Club	Season	League			Playoffs		National cup		Continental		Other		Total	
Club	Season	Division	Apps	Goals	Apps	Goals	Apps	Goals	Apps	Goals	Apps	Goals	Apps	Goals
Long Island Rough Riders	2018	Premier Development League	10	2	—		0	0	—		—		10	2
Columbus Crew	2022	Major League Soccer	5	1	—		0	0	—		—		5	1
Columbus Crew	2023	Major League Soccer	30	3	6	0	3	1	—		3 (Note: Includes 3 appearances in Leagues Cup)	0	42	4
Columbus Crew	2024	Major League Soccer	27	1	2	0	—		5	0	6 (Note: Includes 5 appearances in Leagues Cup and 1 appearance in the Campeones Cup)	0	38	1
Columbus Crew	2025	Major League Soccer	5	0	0	0	—		2	0	0	0	7	0
Columbus Crew	Total		67	5	8	0	3	1	7	0	9	0	92	6
Columbus Crew 2	2022	MLS Next Pro	18	1	3	0	—		—		—		21	1
Columbus Crew 2	2023	MLS Next Pro	1	0	0	0	—		—		—		1	0
Columbus Crew 2	Total		19	1	3	0	—		—		—		22	1
Career total			96	8	11	0	3	1	7	0	9	0	124	9

=== International ===
As of match played January 20, 2024

Appearances and goals by national team and year
National team	Year	Apps	Goals
United States	2024	1	0
Total		1	0

== Honors ==
Georgetown Hoyas

- NCAA Division I men's soccer tournament: 2019

Columbus Crew

- MLS Cup: 2023
- Leagues Cup: 2024
- CONCACAF Champions Cup runner-up: 2024

Columbus Crew 2

- MLS Next Pro: 2022
