= Aidan Morris =

American soccer player (born 2001)

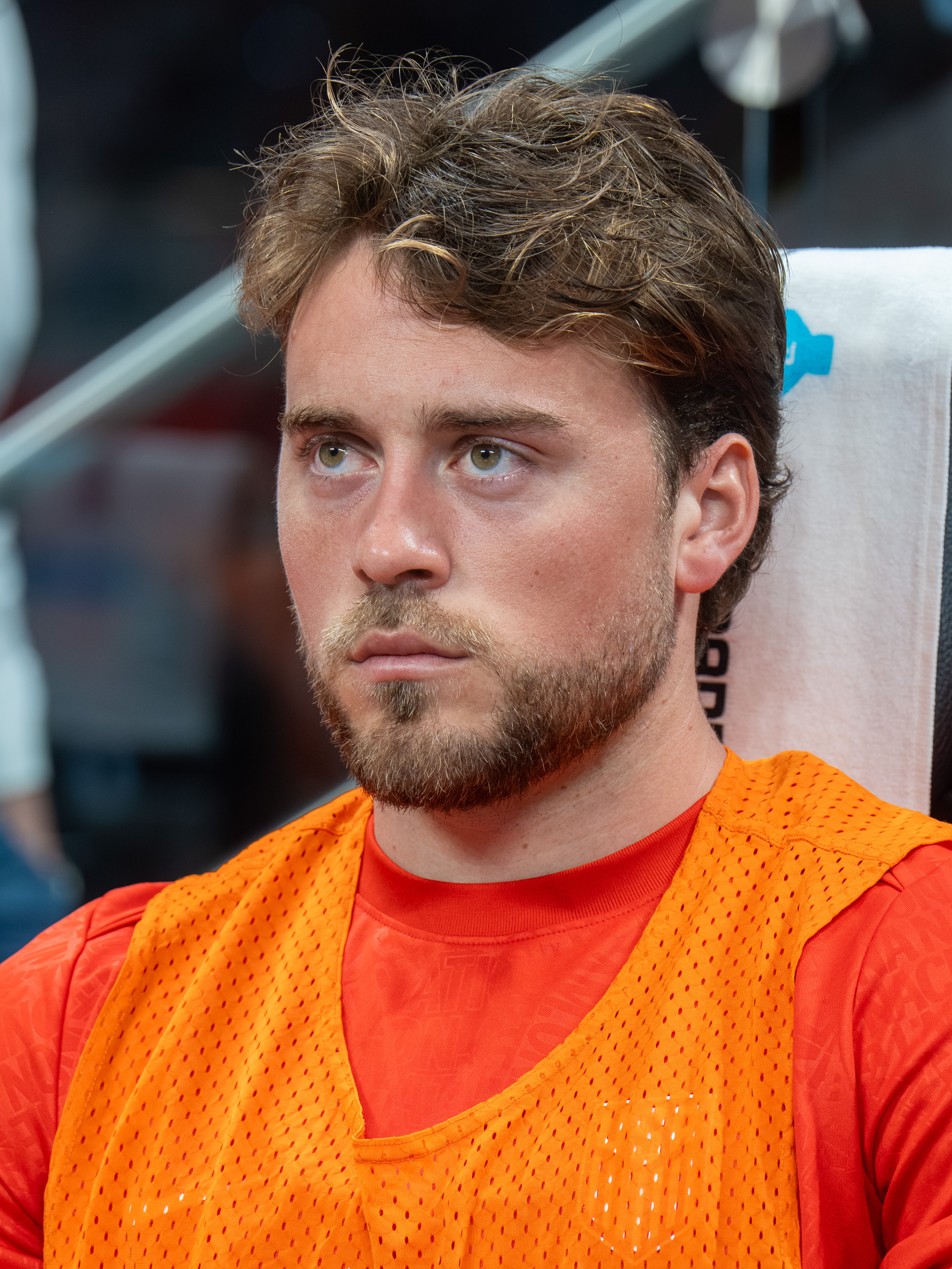
- Morris with the United States in 2026

Personal information
- Full name: Aidan Zen Patrick Morris
- Date of birth: November 16, 2001 (age 24)
- Place of birth: Fort Lauderdale, Florida, U.S.
- Height: 5 ft 10 in (1.77 m)
- Position: Midfielder

Team information
- Current team: Middlesbrough
- Number: 10

Youth career
- 2015–2017: Weston FC
- 2017–2019: Columbus Crew

College career
Years	Team	Apps	(Gls)
2019	Indiana Hoosiers	21	(2)

Senior career*
Years	Team	Apps	(Gls)
2020–2024	Columbus Crew	83	(6)
2022	Columbus Crew 2	3	(0)
2024–	Middlesbrough	89	(2)

International career^{‡}
2018	United States U18	3	(0)
2020	United States U20	2	(0)
2023–2024	United States U23	4	(1)
2023–	United States	14	(0)
- * Club domestic league appearances and goals as of November 7, 2026 ‡ National team caps and goals as of March 31, 2026

Aidan Zen Patrick Morris (born November 16, 2001) is an American professional soccer player who plays as a midfielder for EFL Championship club Middlesbrough and the United States national team.

A native of Fort Lauderdale, Florida, Morris trained at Weston FC before joining the academy of the Columbus Crew in 2017 at the age of 16. He spent a year at Indiana University in 2019, winning the Big Ten Freshman of the Year award before being signed by the Columbus Crew in 2020. He made his debut for the first team the same year, eventually becoming the youngest player in Major League Soccer history to start an MLS Cup. He won two MLS Cups (2020 and 2023) with Columbus before transferring to Middlesbrough in the EFL Championship for a reported $4 million in 2024.

Born in the United States and having Canadian ancestry, Morris was able to represent either the United States or Canada internationally. He was capped several times across multiple youth levels for the United States, before making his senior debut in January 2023.

== Youth career ==
Originally from Florida, Morris played academy soccer for Weston FC, and was recruited to the Columbus Crew Academy, where he played from 2017 to 2019, accumulating 43 appearances and scoring eight goals across his three years in the academy.

He attended Indiana University in 2019, scoring two goals and providing a team-leading eight assists, with head coach Todd Yeagley calling him "a dominant personality." Morris was recognized as the Big Ten Offensive Player of the Week twice on October 8 and 29, and was later named Big Ten Freshman of the Year and won the 2019 TopDrawerSoccer.com National Freshman of the Year Award. After his lone college season, Morris signed as a homegrown player for the Columbus Crew.

== Professional career ==
=== Columbus Crew ===
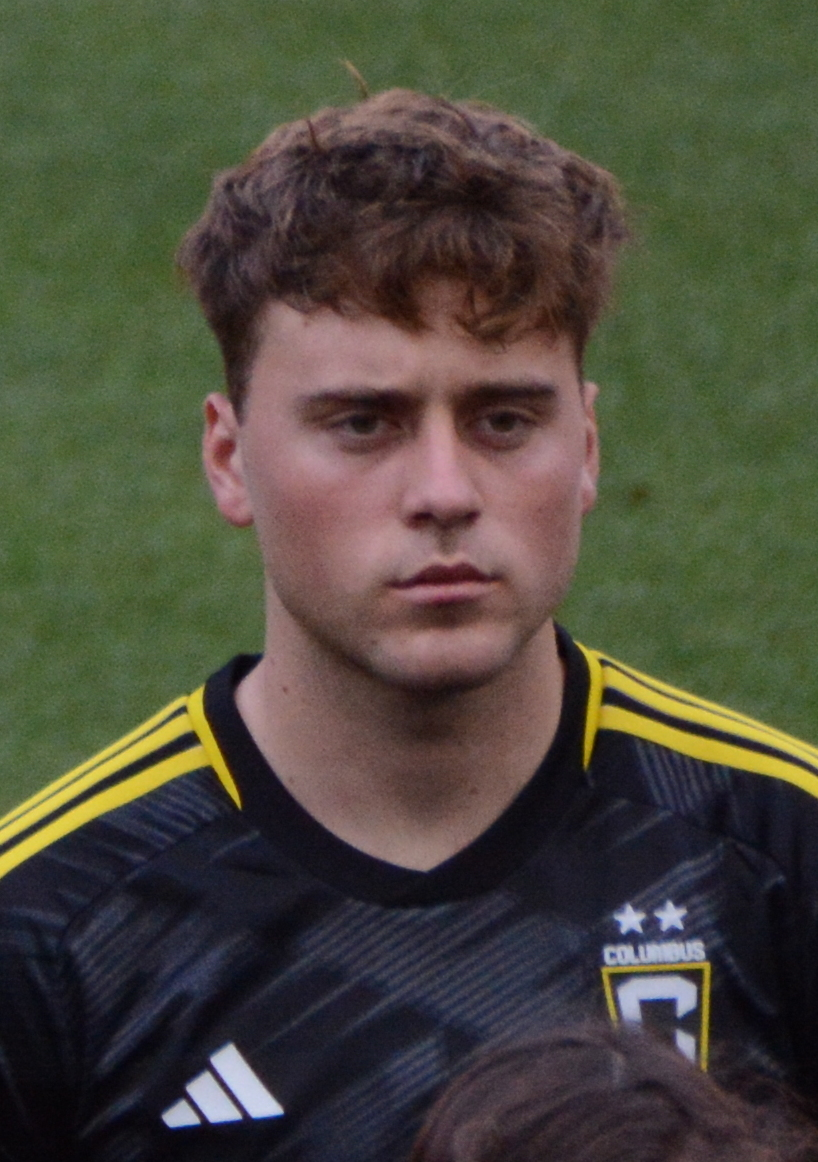
Morris with Columbus Crew in 2023.

==== 2020: MLS Cup champion ====
Morris was announced as a homegrown player signing by the Columbus Crew on January 14, 2020. He made his professional debut in a July 11 match during the MLS is Back Tournament, coming on late in a 4–0 trouncing of in-state rival FC Cincinnati. He made his second appearance for the Crew on July 16, coming off the bench for an injured Darlington Nagbe in the 67th minute of a 2–0 win against New York Red Bulls.

He made his first start for the Crew in October 2020. Overall, Morris made eleven appearances for the Crew during the 2020 MLS season. To cap off the season, on December 12, 2020, he became the youngest player in league history to start in MLS Cup, as he helped guide the Crew to a 3–0 win over the Seattle Sounders.

==== 2021–2022: Injury and breakthrough ====
Morris started the first game of the 2021 season for the Crew, a 4–0 win against Real Estelí in the round of 16 of the CONCACAF Champions League. Morris again started the second leg against Real Esteli, however, he left the game in the fourth minute of what was a 1–0 victory for Columbus with an ACL injury that sidelined him for the entirety of the 2021 MLS season.

Morris made his return to action on the opening game of the 2022 season, coming on as a substitute in the 69th minute of a 4–0 victory for Columbus on February 26. After two months of coming in strictly as a second-half substitute and playing in a few reserve games, Morris started in an April 19 U.S. Open Cup game where he drew a penalty kick in the Crew's 2–1 loss to Detroit City FC. Morris became the starter after an injury to incumbent midfielder Artur. He ended the 2022 season with 21 starts in 28 total appearances.

==== 2023: Second championship ====
During the 2023 preseason, Morris changed his squad number from 21 to 8. During 2023 season, Morris became the full-time starter next to Darlington Nagbe in midfield, shifting from a deep-lying role into a more complete box-to-box position. On March 25, he scored his first goal for the club in a 6–1 win over Atlanta United at home. He added his second and third goals for the club in the following match against Real Salt Lake on April 1.

On April 12, Morris signed a new contract with the Crew until 2026. He scored his fourth goal of the season in the 3–0 Hell is Real derby victory against FC Cincinnati. After making the playoffs for the first time since winning the 2020 MLS Cup, Morris and the Columbus Crew defeated Los Angeles FC 2–1 in the MLS Cup final to give Morris his second championship.

==== 2024 ====
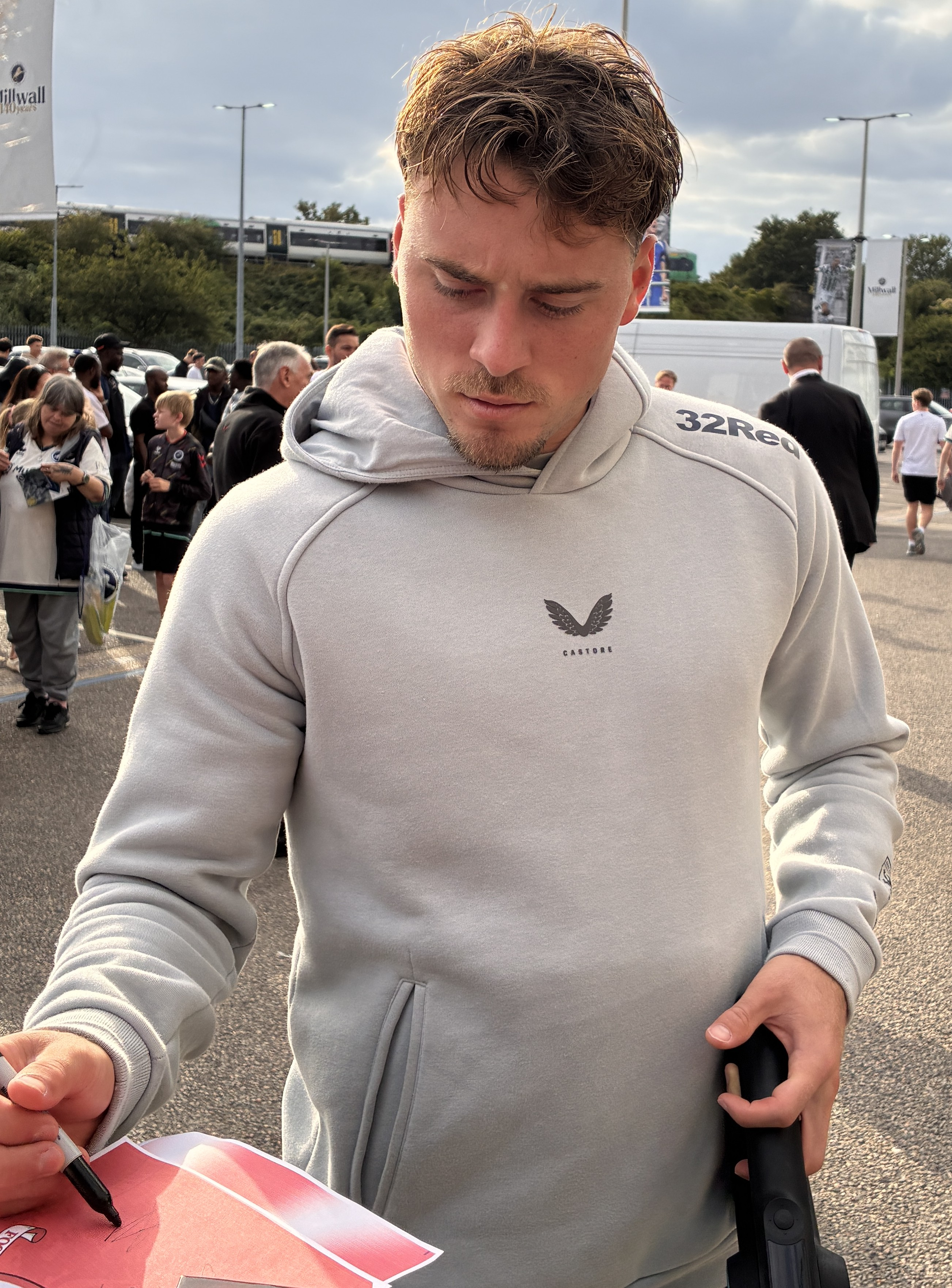
Morris with Middlesbrough in 2025.

During the 2024 season, Morris scored his first goal of the new season on March 16 versus the New York Red Bulls. On April 2, he was sent off for a second yellow in a CONCACAF Champions Cup match versus Tigres UANL. On April 27, he was named captain for the first time for Columbus in the 0–0 draw at home against CF Montréal.

The following game, he scored against C.F. Monterrey in the Champions Cup semifinal, a goal which sent his club to the final. He was named Player of the Match for his efforts. On June 22, he played in his final game for Columbus, subbing out of the game in the 60th minute, with the fans chanting his name in unison to bid him farewell.

=== Middlesbrough ===
After an "emotional" final game with Columbus, Morris was announced as a signing by EFL Championship club Middlesbrough on June 28, 2024. The transfer fee was reported by The Athletic to be in the region of $4 million. He made his debut for Middlesbrough against Swansea City on August 10, 2024, becoming the 1000th player to make a competitive appearance for the club.

On 2 September 2026, Morris scored his first ever goal for the club in a 1–1 league draw with Burnley at Turf Moor.

== International career ==
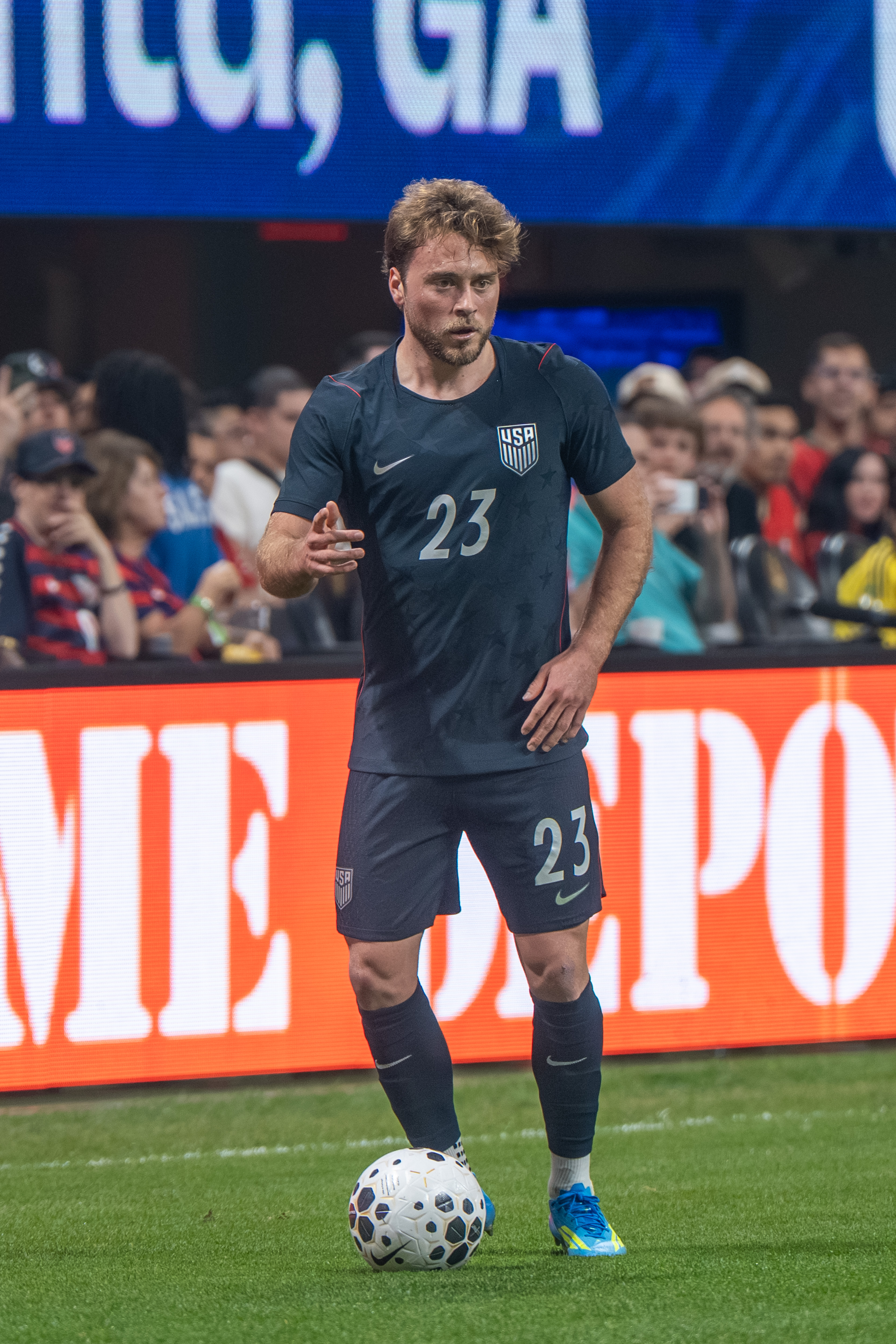
Morris with the United States in 2026

He has made appearances for the United States under-18 and under-20 soccer teams. He made his senior debut in a 2–1 loss to Serbia on January 25, 2023. In May 2023, Morris was listed on both the United States and Canada preliminary rosters for the 2023 CONCACAF Nations League Finals. In June 2023, he committed to the United States, joining their roster for the 2023 CONCACAF Gold Cup. On October 8, 2023, Morris was called up to the United States under-23 national team ahead of friendlies against Mexico and Japan.

== Style of play ==
Morris is known for his drive, aggression, and his excellent ball-winning abilities, which have been attributed to his positioning, determination and impressive work rate. He is a player that is not afraid to tackle or get involved in any part of the field.

== Personal life ==
Born in the United States, Morris is of Canadian descent through his father. He is a fan of Manchester United.

== Career statistics ==
=== Club ===
As of match played November 7, 2026

Appearances and goals by club, season and competition
Club	Season	League			National cup (Note: Includes U.S. Open Cup, FA Cup)		League cup (Note: Includes EFL Cup)		Continental		Other		Total	
Club	Season	Division	Apps	Goals	Apps	Goals	Apps	Goals	Apps	Goals	Apps	Goals	Apps	Goals
Columbus Crew	2020	MLS	10	0	—		—		—		1 (Note: Appearance in MLS Cup playoffs)	0	11	0
Columbus Crew	2021	MLS	0	0	—		—		2 (Note: Appearances in CONCACAF Champions League/Cup)	0	—		2	0
Columbus Crew	2022	MLS	27	0	1	0	—		—		—		28	0
Columbus Crew	2023	MLS	30	4	2	0	—		—		9 (Note: Three appearances in Leagues Cup, six appearances in MLS Cup playoffs)	0	41	4
Columbus Crew	2024	MLS	16	2	—		—		6	1	—		22	3
Columbus Crew	Total		83	6	3	0	—		8	1	10	0	104	7
Columbus Crew 2	2022	MLS Next Pro	3	0	—		—		—		—		3	0
Middlesbrough	2024–25	Championship	35	0	0	0	2	0	—		—		37	0
Middlesbrough	2025–26	Championship	40	0	1	0	1	0	—		3 (Note: Appearances in Championship play-offs)	0	45	0
Middlesbrough	2026–27	Championship	14	2	0	0	2	0	—		0	0	16	2
Middlesbrough	Total		89	2	1	0	5	0	—		3	0	98	2
Career total			175	8	4	0	5	0	8	1	13	0	205	9

=== International ===
As of match played March 31, 2026

Appearances and goals by national team and year
National team	Year	Apps	Goals
United States	2023	4	0
United States	2024	5	0
United States	2025	4	0
United States	2026	1	0
Total		14	0

== Honors ==
Indiana Hoosiers

- Big Ten men's soccer tournament: 2019

Columbus Crew

- MLS Cup: 2020, 2023

Individual

- Top Drawer Soccer Freshman of the Year: 2019
- Big Ten Conference Men's Soccer Freshman of the Year: 2019
- MLS All-Star: 2023
