= Stanislav Lapkes =

Belarusian footballer (born 2006)

Personal information
- Date of birth: 3 March 2006 (age 20)
- Place of birth: Minsk, Belarus
- Height: 1.94 m (6 ft 4 in)
- Position: Goalkeeper

Team information
- Current team: Columbus Crew
- Number: 41

Youth career
- 2012–2019: Dinamo Minsk
- 2019–2022: Columbus Crew

Senior career*
Years	Team	Apps	(Gls)
2022–	Columbus Crew 2	45	(0)
2024–	Columbus Crew	0	(0)
2026	→ Sarasota Paradise (loan)	0	(0)
- * Club domestic league appearances and goals as of 00:24, 27 July 2026 (UTC) ‡ National team caps and goals as of 13:25, 20 March 2025 (UTC)

Stanislav Lapkes (Belarusian: Станіслаў Лапкес; born 3 March 2006) is a Belarusian footballer who plays as a goalkeeper for Major League Soccer club Columbus Crew.

== Youth career ==
Lapkes is the son of Belarusian Olympic fencer Dmitry Lapkes. He began playing in the academy of Dinamo Minsk at the age of six and quickly became the youth team's starting goalkeeper. He remained with the club until his family moved to the United States in 2019, settling in Ohio. Following a successful trial, he was invited to join the Columbus Crew Academy. He was part of the academy team that reached the final of the 2022 MLS Next U17 Cup, eventually falling to the academy of the Philadelphia Union. Lapkes was named the goalkeeper of the tournament for his performances.

== Club career ==
In May 2022, Lapkes signed an amateur contract with Columbus Crew 2 of MLS Next Pro. He made his debut the following year on 16 April 2023 in a victory over New England Revolution II. That season, he made sixteen league appearances, earning five shutouts. He signed his first professional contract with the club on 7 September 2023. On 22 October 2023, he became the youngest goalkeeper to start in the MLS Next Pro Cup. at 17 years, seven months and 19 days old. Lapkes was one of four MLS NEXT Pro goalkeepers selected to compete in the Goalie Wars skills competition as part of the 2024 MLS All-Star Game. During the 2024 Major League Soccer season, he appeared on the bench for the first team five times, but never made an appearance.

Lapkes signed a contract with the Columbus Crew first team in January 2025. The Homegrown Player deal would see the player remain at the club through the 2027 season, with the Crew holding an option for an additional two years. He made his U.S. Open Cup debut for the reserve team on 19 March 2025 in a 4–1 victory over NY Renegades FC.

On 5 March 2026, Lapkes was loaned to USL League One side Sarasota Paradise. He was recalled by Columbus two months later on 8 May without making a single appearance for the Florida-based club.
