= Owen Presthus =

American soccer player (born 2006)

- Presthus with the Columbus Crew in 2026

Personal information
- Full name: Owen Lange Presthus
- Date of birth: February 21, 2006 (age 20)
- Place of birth: Columbus, Ohio, United States
- Height: 5 ft 10 in (1.78 m)
- Position: Defender

Team information
- Current team: Nashville SC
- Number: 17

Youth career
- 2012–2017: Sporting Columbus
- 2017–2024: Columbus Crew

Senior career*
Years	Team	Apps	(Gls)
2023–2026	Columbus Crew 2	60	(6)
2025	→ Hartford Athletic (loan)	4	(1)
2026	Columbus Crew	1	(0)
2026–	→ Nashville SC (loan)	0	(0)
2026–	→ Huntsville City FC (res.)	3	(0)

International career^{‡}
2025	United States U19	2	(0)
2025–	United States U20	3	(0)
- * Club domestic league appearances and goals as of 01:23, 4 October 2026 (UTC) ‡ National team caps and goals as of 01:23, 4 October 2026 (UTC)

Owen Lange Presthus (born February 21, 2006) is an American professional soccer player who plays as a defender for Major League Soccer club Nashville SC, on loan from the Columbus Crew.

== Early and personal life ==
Owen Presthus was born in Columbus, Ohio to former professional soccer player Tom Presthus and Melissa, who played college soccer for the Southern Methodist University Mustangs. He has an older brother, TJ, who plays for Hartford Athletic, as well as a younger brother, Rhys, who is currently in the Columbus Crew Academy.

== Youth career ==
Presthus joined youth club Sporting Columbus at the age of six, and continued with the club until 2017, when he joined the Columbus Crew Academy. In 2023, while playing for the Crew under-17 team, Presthus scored an Olimpico, a goal scored directly from a corner kick, in a tournament match against Manchester United.

In early 2024, Presthus committed to the University of Maryland, College Park to play for the Terrapins. However, it was announced on August 8, 2024, that he would forego his scholarship to sign a contract with the Columbus Crew's reserve team.

== Club career ==
=== Columbus Crew 2 ===
On July 7, 2023, while still in the academy system, Presthus signed an amateur contract with the Columbus Crew's second team for the remainder of the MLS Next Pro season. He made his debut the same day in a 3–2 win versus Toronto FC II. On August 8, 2024, Presthus signed a professional contract with the reserve team. He made his U.S. Open Cup debut on March 19, 2025, a 4–1 victory over NY Renegades FC.

==== Loan to Hartford ====
On August 15, 2025, it was announced that Presthus would be loaned to USL Championship side Hartford Athletic until the end of the season. He started and scored in his debut, netting the final goal in a 3–0 victory against Rhode Island FC.

=== Columbus Crew ===
Presthus in a U.S. Open Cup match in 2026

On January 7, 2026, Presthus signed a first team contract with the Columbus Crew. He made three appearances across all competitions for the club before being sent on loan to Nashville SC.

==== Loan to Nashville SC ====
On August 31, 2026, Nashville SC acquired Presthus on loan with a purchase option.

== Style of play ==
A two-footed player, Presthus has been praised for his tactical acumen, awareness, and positional versatility.
