= Cole Mrowka =

Filipino footballer (born 2006)

Personal information
- Date of birth: April 6, 2006 (age 20)
- Place of birth: Chicago, Illinois, United States
- Height: 5 ft 11 in (1.80 m)
- Position: Midfielder

Youth career
- Chicago Fire FC
- –2022: Sockers FC
- 2022–2023: Columbus Crew

Senior career*
Years	Team	Apps	(Gls)
2022–2026	Columbus Crew 2	43	(5)
2024–2026	Columbus Crew	3	(0)
2024-	→ Colorado Springs Switchbacks (loan)	7	(0)
2025	→ Colorado Springs Switchbacks (loan)	9	(1)

International career^{‡}
2026–	Philippines	2	(1)
- * Club domestic league appearances and goals as of 04:23, 8 July 2026 (UTC) ‡ National team caps and goals as of 22:02; 9 June 2026 (UTC)

Cole Mrowka (born April 6, 2006) is a professional footballer who played as a midfielder for Major League Soccer club Columbus Crew. Born in the United States, he plays for the Philippines national team.

== Club career ==
Born in Chicago, Illinois, Mrowka started his youth career in the academy of Chicago Fire FC before moving to Sockers FC, and then finally settling with the Columbus Crew Academy, where he signed an amateur contract with the second team on August 14, 2022. He made his debut the same day in a 3–3 draw versus FC Cincinnati 2. He would go on to sign a professional contract with the second team a year later on August 18, 2023.

On March 5, 2024, he signed a homegrown contract with Columbus Crew, and made his debut for the first team on May 16 during a 3–1 win over CF Montréal. On August 23, 2024, Mrowka was loaned to Colorado Springs Switchbacks. During his time with the Switchbacks, Mrowka recorded his first assist with the club on October 12, and assisted the game-winning goal in the Western Conference semi-final. The club would go on to win the USL Championship Final, giving Mrowka his first league championship.

During the 2025 season, Mrowka made his season debut for Columbus as a second-half substitute in a CONCACAF Champions Cup game against Los Angeles FC. Having appeared only three times across all competitions for the first team, he was loaned out for a second time to Colorado Springs, with the loan being announced on August 29. In his first game back with the Switchbacks, he scored the second goal in a 2–0 victory at home to FC Tulsa.

== International career ==
Mrowka made his debut for the Philippines national football team in a June 3, 2026 friendly against Guam. He scored the first goal for his side in the game which ended in a 5–1 victory for the Philippines.

== Style of play ==
A two-footed player, Mrowka has been noted for his passing, intelligence, and quick decision-making on the ball.

== Personal life ==
Mrowka is of Filipino descent through his mother and of Polish descent through his father. He cites Kevin De Bruyne and Mesut Özil as his idols.

== Career statistics ==
=== International ===
Scores and results list the Philippines' goal tally first.

#	Date	Venue	Opponent	Score	Result	Competition
1.	3 June 2026	Rizal Memorial Stadium, Manila, Philippines	Guam	1–0	5–1	Friendly

== Honors ==
Colorado Springs Switchbacks

- USL Championship Final: 2024
