= Nicholas Hagen =

Guatemalan footballer (born 1996)

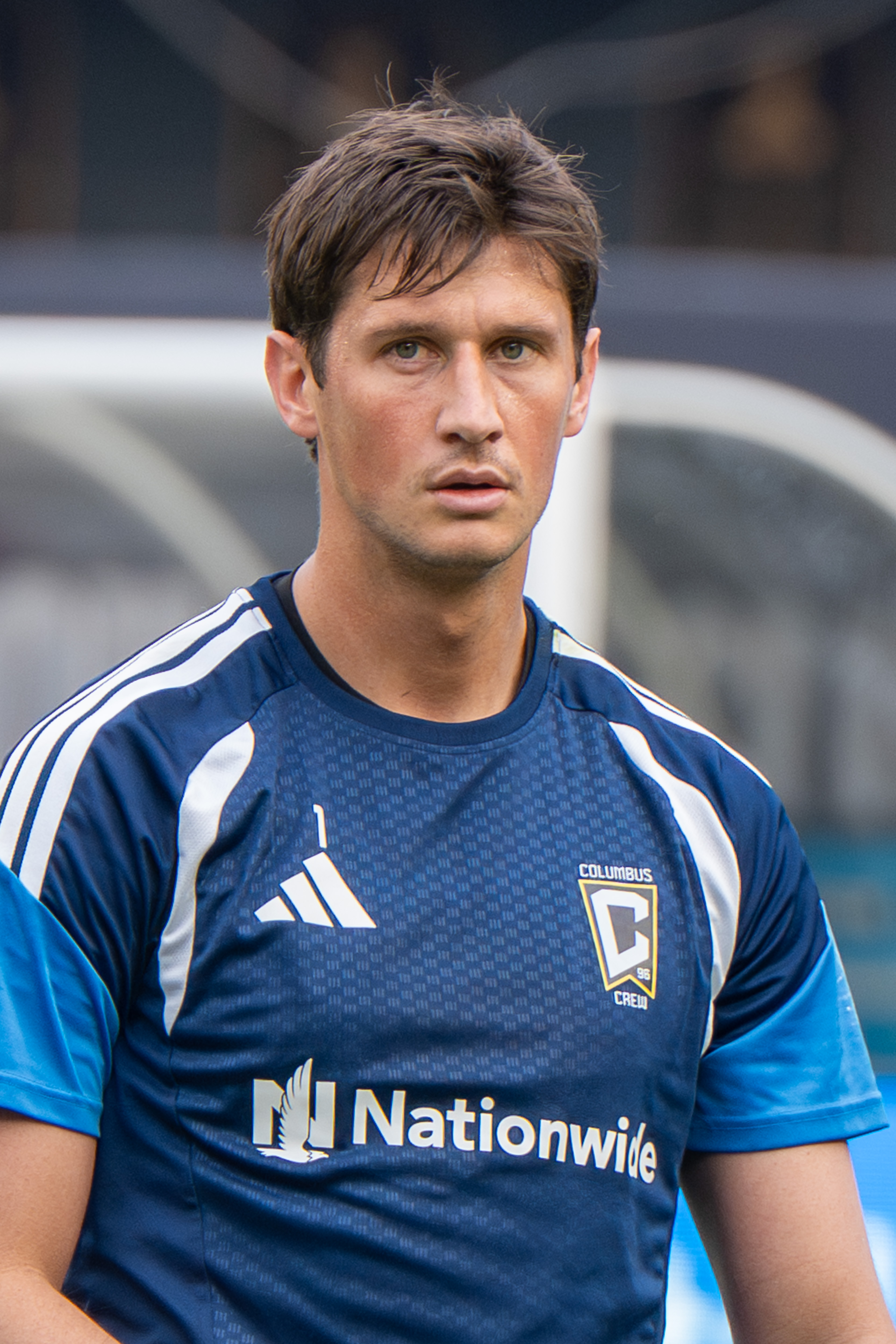
- Hagen with Columbus Crew in 2026

Personal information
- Full name: Nicholas George Hagen Godoy
- Date of birth: 2 August 1996 (age 30)
- Place of birth: Guatemala City, Guatemala
- Height: 1.93 m (6 ft 4 in)
- Position: Goalkeeper

Team information
- Current team: Columbus Crew
- Number: 1

Youth career
- Futeca Camp Elite
- Antigua
- 2013–2014: FC Dallas

Senior career*
| Years | Team | Apps | (Gls) |
| 2016–2020 | Municipal | 132 | (0) |
| 2020–2021 | Sabail | 26 | (0) |
| 2021–2023 | Hamarkameratene | 40 | (0) |
| 2023 | Bnei Sakhnin | 4 | (0) |
| 2024– | Columbus Crew | 7 | (0) |
| 2024– | Columbus Crew 2 | 3 | (0) |

International career^{‡}
| 2012–2013 | Guatemala U17 | 5 | (0) |
| 2015 | Guatemala U20 | 6 | (0) |
| 2018– | Guatemala | 59 | (0) |
- * Club domestic league appearances and goals as of 20:00, 31 May 2025 (UTC) ‡ National team caps and goals as of 20:00, 2 August 2026 (UTC)

Nicholas George Hagen Godoy (born 2 August 1996) is a Guatemalan professional footballer who plays as a goalkeeper for Major League Soccer club Columbus Crew and the Guatemala national team.

== Club career ==
=== Municipal ===
Hagen began his professional career in 2014 by signing with the under-20 side of Municipal, and joining the senior team on 1 July 2016. He won 2 Liga Nacional titles and received the Josue Danny Ortiz Trophy in the Clausura Tournament 2017, an award given to the goalkeeper with the least amount of defeats. Notably, he was the youngest goalkeeper to obtain this recognition.

=== Sabail ===
After six years with Municipal, Hagen decided to leave Los Rojos in order to try his luck abroad, with the player stating that his desire to grow was a reason for his departure. He would go on to sign with Sabail of the Azerbaijan Premier League on 4 September 2020 as a free transfer and was there until the end of the 2020–21 season, ending his contract with the club in July 2021.

=== Hamarkameratene ===
On 30 July 2021, it was news that he had signed with the Norwegian club Hamarkameratene for the remainder of the 2021 season. During his half-season in Norway, he went undefeated in his 17 league appearances as his side were promoted to the Eliteserien. During the 2022 season, Hagen started in the club's first 23 games. Upon returning to his club side after international duty in September, Hagen was relegated to the bench and did not appear in any further games for the remainder of the year, as HamKam avoided relegation. At the start of the 2023 season, with Hagen's contract expiring at the end of June and with a new manager at the helm, Hagen saw no action as his deal expired in the middle of the season.

=== Bnei Sakhnin ===
On 1 July 2023, he signed for Bnei Sakhnin of the Israel League, and played in four of the club's first five matches before the suspension of the league due to the Israeli–Palestinian conflict, before requesting the termination of his contract.

=== Columbus Crew ===
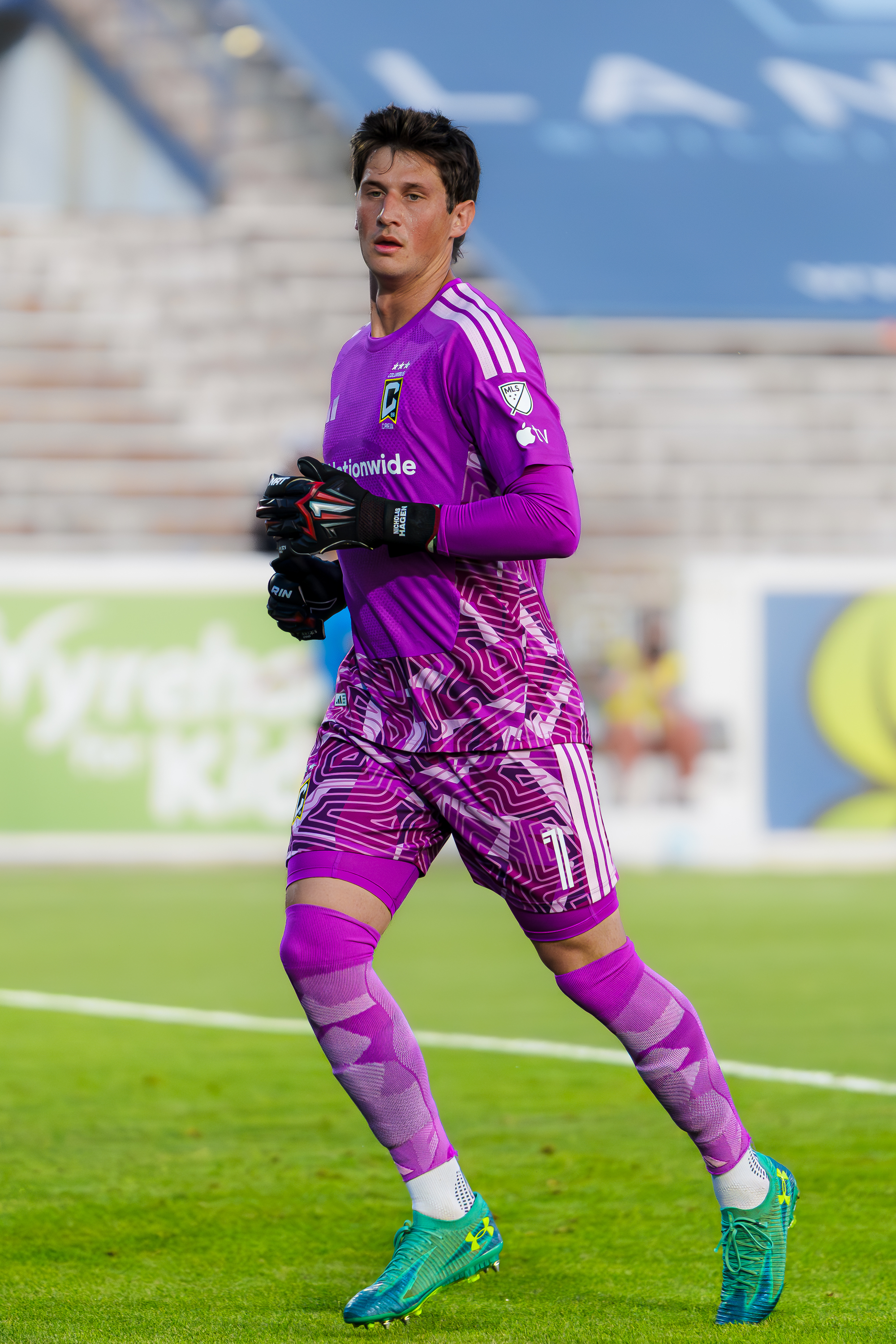
Hagen with Columbus Crew in 2026

On 12 December 2023, Hagen signed with Major League Soccer club Columbus Crew, and made his debut with his new side on 13 April 2024 by replacing an injured Evan Bush, in a match against Real Salt Lake. On 17 July, Hagen received his first start for Columbus after incumbent starter Patrick Schulte was called up for the United States Olympic team. On 9 August, Hagen would start in the Round of 32 Leagues Cup match against Sporting Kansas City and record his first ever clean sheet with Columbus in a 4–0 win. Hagen would start in the following round of the tournament, where his club would emerge victorious, beating defending champions Inter Miami CF 3–2. In the following two rounds of the tournament, Hagen would be benched as Patrick Schulte would return to the starting squad and Columbus would advance to the finals. However, in the final of the 2024 Leagues Cup, Hagen was given the starting nod, and his club emerged victorious, beating LAFC 3–1 to secure his first title with his new club.

Hagen signed a contract extension with the Crew on 9 January 2025. He made his 2025 season debut on 24 May in a 3–2 loss at Charlotte FC, after starter Patrick Schulte suffered an injury in pre-game warm-ups. He started the next two games for his club, before departing for the 2025 Gold Cup for Guatemala. While playing for Guatemala, he suffered an injury and was sidelined for a month. He finished the season with three total appearances.

== International career ==
Hagen made his debut for the Guatemala national team on 18 August 2018. On 6 June and then 8 June 2024, Hagen kept consecutive clean sheets in Guatemala’s 2026 FIFA World Cup qualifiers against Dominica in a 6-0 win and against the British Virgin Islands in a 3-0 win.

== Career statistics ==
=== Club ===
As of match played 19 October 2024

Appearances and goals by club, season and competition
| Club | Season | League | | | National cup (Note: Includes Azerbaijan Cup, Norwegian Football Cup, Toto Cup) | | Continental | | Other | | Total | |
| Club | Season | Division | Apps | Goals | Apps | Goals | Apps | Goals | Apps | Goals | Apps | Goals |
|---|---|---|---|---|---|---|---|---|---|---|---|---|
| Municipal | 2014–15 | Liga Nacional de Guatemala | 0 | 0 | — | | — | | — | | 0 | 0 |
| Municipal | 2015–16 | Liga Nacional de Guatemala | 3 | 0 | — | | — | | — | | 3 | 0 |
| Municipal | 2016–17 | Liga Nacional de Guatemala | 25 | 0 | — | | — | | — | | 25 | 0 |
| Municipal | 2017–18 | Liga Nacional de Guatemala | 46 | 0 | — | | — | | — | | 46 | 0 |
| Municipal | 2018–19 | Liga Nacional de Guatemala | 22 | 0 | — | | — | | — | | 22 | 0 |
| Municipal | 2019–20 | Liga Nacional de Guatemala | 36 | 0 | — | | — | | — | | 36 | 0 |
| Municipal | Total | | 132 | 0 | — | | — | | — | | 132 | 0 |
| Sabail | 2020–21 | Azerbaijan Premier League | 26 | 0 | 1 | 0 | — | | — | | 27 | 0 |
| HamKam | 2021 | Norwegian First Division | 17 | 0 | 1 | 0 | — | | — | | 18 | 0 |
| HamKam | 2022 | Eliteserien | 23 | 0 | 0 | 0 | — | | — | | 23 | 0 |
| HamKam | 2023 | Eliteserien | 0 | 0 | 0 | 0 | — | | — | | 0 | 0 |
| HamKam | Total | | 40 | 0 | 1 | 0 | — | | — | | 41 | 0 |
| Bnei Sakhnin | 2023–24 | Israeli Premier League | 4 | 0 | 3 | 0 | — | | — | | 7 | 0 |
| Columbus Crew | 2024 | MLS | 4 | 0 | 0 | 0 | 0 | 0 | 3 (Note: Appearance(s) in Leagues Cup) | 0 | 7 | 0 |
| Columbus Crew 2 | 2024 | MLS Next Pro | 1 | 0 | — | | — | | — | | 1 | 0 |
| Career Total | | | 207 | 0 | 5 | 0 | 0 | 0 | 3 | 0 | 215 | 0 |

=== International ===
As of match played 7 June 2026

Appearances and goals by national team and year
| National team | Year | Apps | Goals |
|---|---|---|---|
| Guatemala | 2018 | 2 | 0 |
| Guatemala | 2019 | 8 | 0 |
| Guatemala | 2020 | 1 | 0 |
| Guatemala | 2021 | 8 | 0 |
| Guatemala | 2022 | 4 | 0 |
| Guatemala | 2023 | 13 | 0 |
| Guatemala | 2024 | 11 | 0 |
| Guatemala | 2025 | 11 | 0 |
| Guatemala | 2026 | 1 | 0 |
| Total | | 59 | 0 |

== Honours ==
Municipal

- Liga Nacional de Guatemala: Clausura 2017, Apertura 2019

HamKam

- 1.divisjon: 2021

Columbus Crew

- Leagues Cup: 2024
- CONCACAF Champions Cup runner-up: 2024
