= Patrick Schulte =

American soccer player (born 2001)

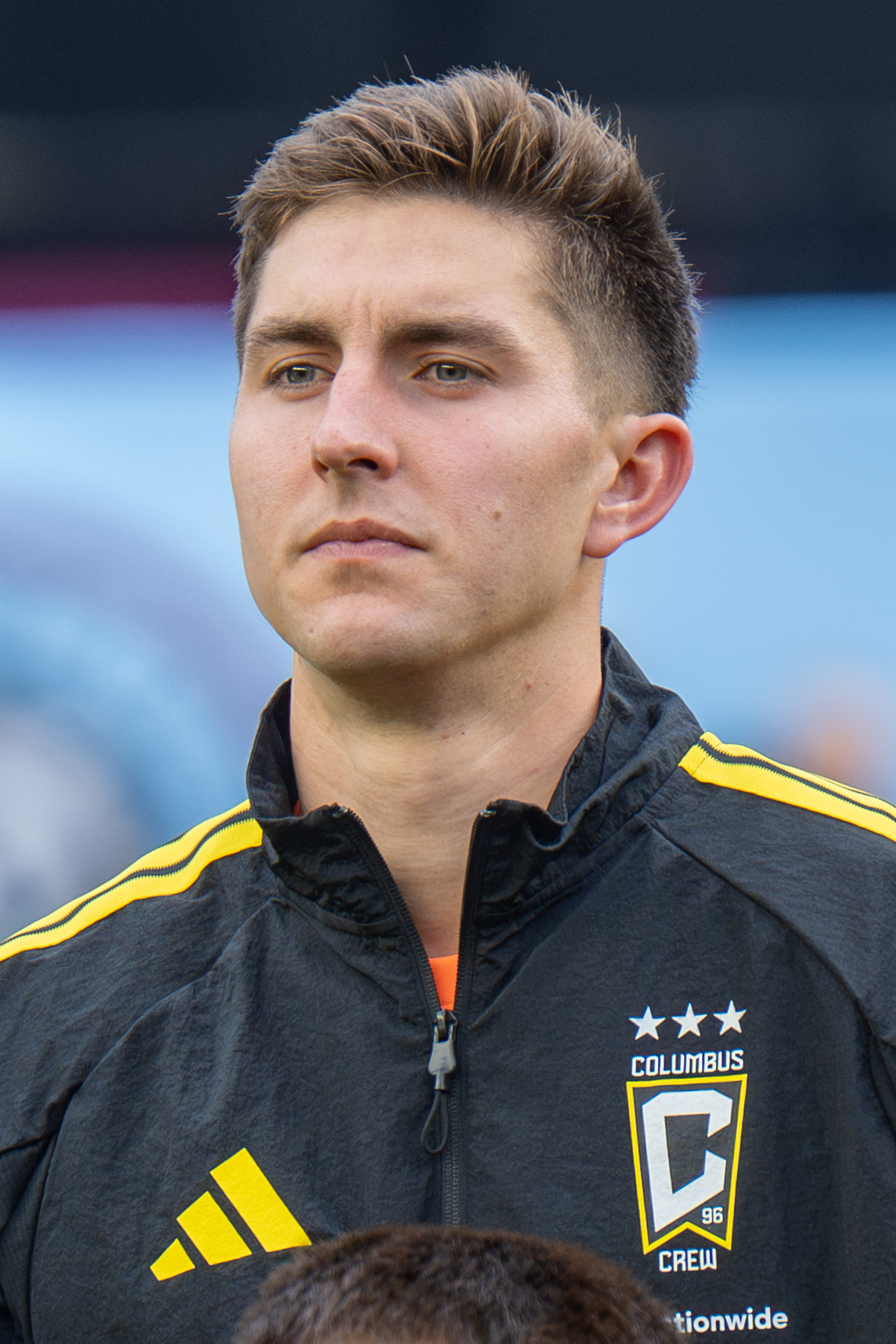
- Schulte with the Columbus Crew in 2026

Personal information
- Full name: Patrick Timothy Schulte
- Date of birth: March 13, 2001 (age 25)
- Place of birth: St. Charles, Missouri, U.S.
- Height: 6 ft 3 in (1.90 m)
- Position: Goalkeeper

Team information
- Current team: Columbus Crew
- Number: 28

Youth career
- 2012–2017: St. Louis Scott Gallagher
- 2017–2019: Saint Louis FC

College career
Years	Team	Apps	(Gls)
2019–2021	Saint Louis Billikens	51	(0)

Senior career*
Years	Team	Apps	(Gls)
2019	Saint Louis FC	0	(0)
2021	St. Louis Scott Gallagher	9	(0)
2022–	Columbus Crew	117	(0)
2022	Columbus Crew 2	15	(0)

International career^{‡}
2019–2020	United States U20	2	(0)
2023–2024	United States U23	7	(0)
2024–	United States	3	(0)
- * Club domestic league appearances and goals as of 8 November 2026 ‡ National team caps and goals as of January 18, 2025

Patrick Timothy Schulte (/ˈʃʌlti/ SHUL-tee; born March 13, 2001) is an American professional soccer player who plays as a goalkeeper for Major League Soccer club Columbus Crew and the United States national team.

== Early career and college ==
Originally starting out as a winger, Schulte moved into goal when he was "11 or 12" while playing for St. Louis Scott Gallagher's youth team. In 2017, he moved to the academy of Saint Louis FC (affiliates with St. Louis Scott Gallagher). In 2019, Schulte signed to the first team on an academy contract and started in a Lamar Hunt U.S. Open Cup fixture against Des Moines Menace on May 15, helping the team progress via penalty shootout by saving three of the four penalties that he faced.

In 2019, Schulte committed to playing college soccer at Saint Louis University. In three seasons with the Billikens, Schulte went on to make 51 appearances and record 22 shutouts. During his freshman year, he made a career-high seven saves in a 6–2 win at Marquette on October 1, 2019, and was named to the Atlantic 10 Conference All-Rookie team. His sophomore year saw Schulte take Atlantic 10 Conference Defensive Player of the Year and be named A-10 first-team All-Conference. In 2021, he was again named A-10 first-team All-Conference, as well as United Soccer Coaches second-team All-Region, and Most Outstanding Player of the A-10 Championship.

While at college, Schulte also played in the USL League Two, making nine regular season appearances for St. Louis Scott Gallagher during the 2021 season.

On January 6, 2022, it was announced that Schulte would leave college early and sign a Generation Adidas contract with Major League Soccer, allowing him to enter the 2022 MLS SuperDraft.

== Club career ==
=== Columbus Crew ===
==== 2022: Reserves ====
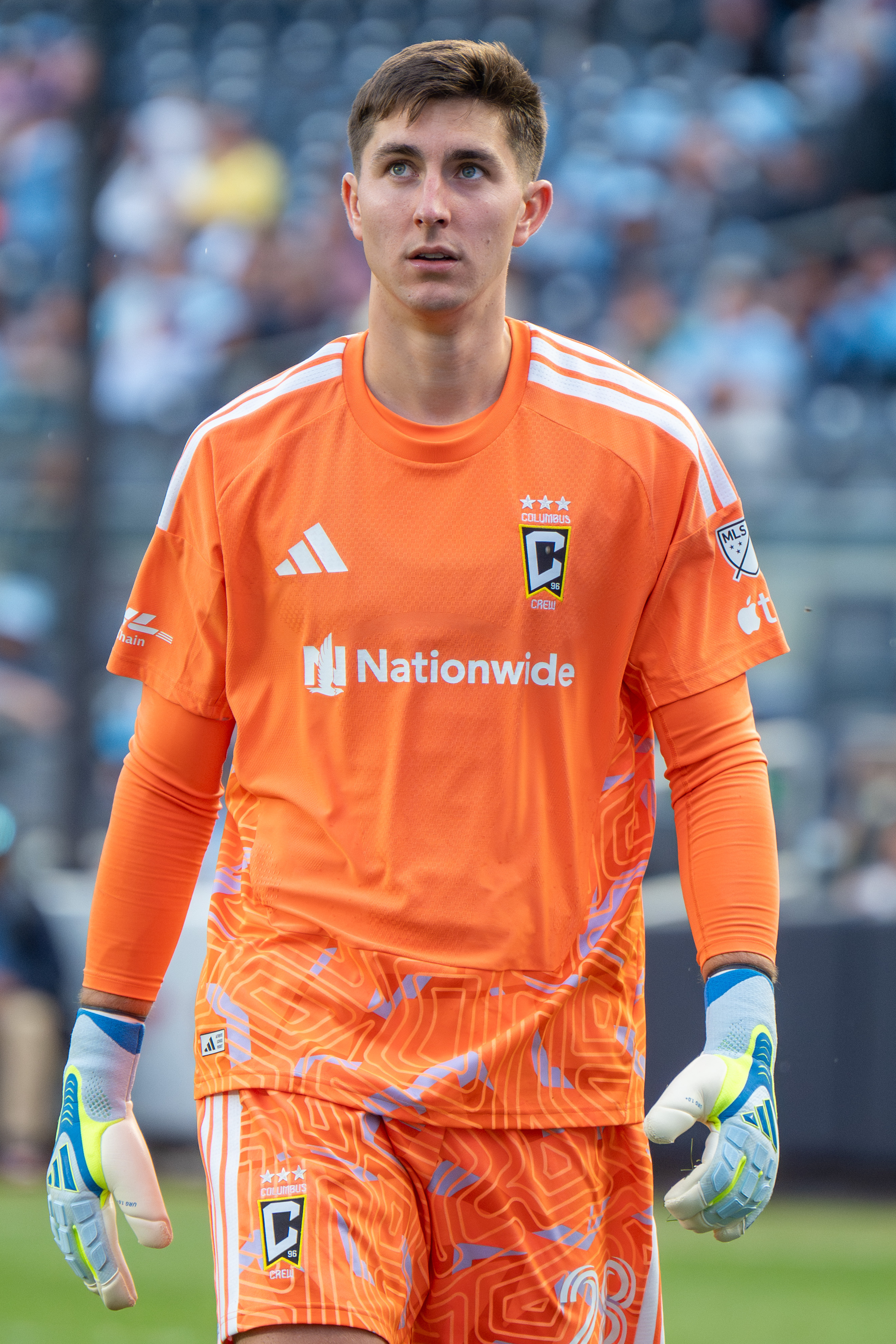
Schulte with the Columbus Crew in 2026.

On January 11, 2022, Schulte was selected 12th overall by the Columbus Crew in the MLS SuperDraft. He spent the entirety of the 2022 season with the Crew's MLS Next Pro side Columbus Crew 2, winning the inaugural MLS Next Pro Cup and the MLS Next Pro Goalkeeper of the Year award.

==== 2023 ====
In the first game of the 2023 season, first team goalkeeper Eloy Room was left out of the lineup due to visa issues, allowing Schulte to earn his first start with the senior team in a 4–1 loss away to the Philadelphia Union, during which he faced two penalty kicks and failed to save either. After remaining on the bench for the next three matches, Schulte was in goal for the 6–1 home victory against Atlanta United on March 25, while Room was on international duty with Curaçao. Following a training injury to Eloy Room, Schulte remained the starter for the remainder of the MLS regular season and playoffs, winning MLS Cup 2023 to conclude the season.

==== 2024 ====
Schulte started all matches for Columbus during their 2024 Champions Cup campaign. After an early mishandling of the ball led to a Tigres UANL goal, Schulte redeemed himself by making two saves in the penalty shootout, helping Columbus pull off the upset and continue their historic run to the tournament final. Following the conclusion of the tournament, he was selected to the Best XI and was named Best Goalkeeper of the tournament.

==== 2025 ====
Before the beginning of the 2025 season, Schulte signed a contract extension through 2027, with an additional option year. On May 24, 2025, he was injured during warm ups in a game versus Charlotte FC, causing him to miss seven games. He made his return from injury on July 12 in a match against Hell Is Real rivals FC Cincinnati.

== International career ==
Schulte was called up for a training camp with the United States under-18 team in 2019, and appeared twice for the under-20's.

Schulte made his debut for the senior United States national team on January 20, 2024, in a friendly against Slovenia.

During the 2024 Summer Olympics, Schulte was the starting goalkeeper for the tournament, as the United States U23's were eliminated in the quarterfinals by Morocco U23's.

== Career statistics ==
=== Club ===
As of match played November 8, 2025

Appearances and goals by club, season and competition
Club	Season	League			National cup (Note: Includes U.S. Open Cup)		League cup (Note: Includes MLS Cup playoffs, MLS Next Pro playoffs)		Continental (Note: Includes CONCACAF Champions Cup)		Other (Note: Includes Leagues Cup, Campeones Cup)		Total	
Club	Season	Division	Apps	Goals	Apps	Goals	Apps	Goals	Apps	Goals	Apps	Goals	Apps	Goals
Columbus Crew	2023	MLS	31	0	—		6	0	—		1	0	38	0
Columbus Crew	2024	MLS	27	0	—		2	0	7	0	3	0	39	0
Columbus Crew	2025	MLS	25	0	—		3	0	2	0	2	0	32	0
Columbus Crew	Total		83	0	—		11	0	9	0	6	0	106	0
Columbus Crew 2	2022	MLS Next Pro	15	0	—		3	0	—		—		18	0
Career total			98	0	0	0	14	0	9	0	6	0	124	0

=== International ===
As of match played January 18, 2025

Appearances and goals by national team and year
National team	Year	Apps	Goals
United States	2024	2	0
United States	2025	1	0
Total		3	0

== Honors ==
Columbus Crew 2

- MLS Next Pro Cup: 2022
- MLS Next Pro Regular Season Champion: 2022

Columbus Crew

- MLS Cup: 2023
- Leagues Cup: 2024
- CONCACAF Champions Cup runner-up: 2024

Individual

- MLS Next Pro Goalkeeper of the Year: 2022
- MLS Next Pro Goalkeeper of the Month: August 2022
- MLS Next Pro Best XI: 2022
- CONCACAF Champions Cup Best Goalkeeper: 2024
- CONCACAF Champions Cup Best XI: 2024
