= Keegan Hughes =

American soccer player (born 2000)

Personal information
- Full name: Keegan Monroe Hughes
- Date of birth: July 22, 2000 (age 26)
- Place of birth: Newark, Ohio, U.S.
- Height: 6 ft 3 in (1.91 m)
- Position: Defender

Youth career
- 2013–2019: Columbus Crew

College career
Years	Team	Apps	(Gls)
2019–2022	Stanford Cardinal	73	(8)

Senior career*
Years	Team	Apps	(Gls)
2023–2024	Columbus Crew	1	(0)
2023–2024	Columbus Crew 2	9	(1)
2023	→ FC Tulsa (loan)	9	(1)
2024	→ Loudoun United (loan)	29	(0)
2025–2026	New England Revolution II	5	(0)
2025–2026	New England Revolution	8	(0)
2026	→ Birmingham Legion (loan)	7	(0)
- * Club domestic league appearances and goals as of June 21, 2026

Keegan Monroe Hughes (born July 22, 2000) is an American soccer player.

== Playing career ==
=== Youth and college ===
Hughes was born in Newark, Ohio, and grew up in Heath, Ohio. He joined the Columbus Crew academy in 2013, going on to play at every level of the academy, including two seasons as captain and was named academy player of the season in 2018.

In 2019, Hughes committed to Stanford University to play college soccer. Over four seasons with the Cardinal, Hughes made 73 appearances, missing only a single game, scoring eight goals and tallying seven assists. His college accolades include been a Pac-12 Conference champion in 2020, First-Team All-American, Pac-12 Defensive Player of the Year, MAC Hermann Trophy Finalist in 2022, and was named three times to the Pac-12 Academic Honor Roll.

=== Professional ===
On January 11, 2023, Hughes was announced as a homegrown player signing for Columbus Crew ahead of their 2023 season on a two-year deal. He spent time with the team's MLS Next Pro side Columbus Crew 2, before heading out on loan to USL Championship side FC Tulsa on August 4, 2023, for the remainder of the season. In February 2024, Hughes once again moved to the USL Championship on loan, this time with Loudoun United. Following the 2024 season, Columbus declined Hughes' contract option and he became a free agent. On January 3, 2025, Hughes signed a one-year deal with MLS Next Pro side New England Revolution II. On March 4, 2025, Hughes was signed by New England's first team Major League Soccer side. Hughes was waived by New England on October 9, 2026.
