= 2021 Columbus Crew season =

Columbus Crew SC
2021 season
- Investor-operators: Dee Haslam; Jimmy Haslam; JW Johnson; Whitney Johnson; Dr. Pete Edwards
- Head coach: Caleb Porter
- Stadium: Historic Crew Stadium (until June 19, 2021); Lower.com Field (since July 3, 2021)
- Major League Soccer: Conference: 9th Overall: 17th
- MLS Cup playoffs: Did not qualify
- U.S. Open Cup: Canceled
- CONCACAF Champions League: Quarterfinals
- Campeones Cup: Winners
- Top goalscorer: League: Lucas Zelarayán (12); All: Lucas Zelarayán (13)
- Highest home attendance: 20,407 (7/3 v. NE)
- Lowest home attendance: 5,180 (4/18 v. PHI) and (5/8 v. DC)
- Average home league attendance: 16,583 (81.4%)
- Biggest win: EST 0–4 CLB (4/8); CLB 0–4 MIA (10/16)
- Biggest defeat: MTRY 3–0 CLB (5/5); PHI 3–0 CLB (10/3)
Home colors	Away colors

The 2021 Columbus Crew season was the club's 26th season of existence and their 26th consecutive season in Major League Soccer, the top flight of soccer in the United States and Canada. The first match of the season was on April 18 against Philadelphia Union. It was the third season under head coach Caleb Porter.

The 2021 season saw Columbus defending their 2020 MLS Cup championship, as well as the opening of Lower.com Field, the club's new downtown stadium. They hosted the 2021 Campeones Cup against Cruz Azul, the winner of the Liga MX's Campeón de Campeones winning 2–0. The club also participated in the CONCACAF Champions League, their first appearance since the 2010–11 tournament.

The team began playing the season under the name Columbus Crew SC until a rebrand on May 10, 2021, after which the name was changed to Columbus SC. However, after criticism over the rebrand was spurred by its fans, the club announced that it would return to its original name. The "SC" was dropped and the club was once again the Columbus Crew.

This was the last season in which Columbus Crew played at Historic Crew Stadium, where the team played their final match against the Chicago Fire on June 19, 2021, with a 2–0 win. The team then moved to Lower.com Field near downtown Columbus, where they would play their first match at the new stadium against the New England Revolution with a 2–2 draw on July 3, 2021.

== Roster ==
As of October 28, 2021

Note: Flags indicate national team as defined under FIFA eligibility rules; some limited exceptions apply. Players may hold more than one non-FIFA nationality.

No.	Pos.	Nation	Player
1	GK	CUW	Eloy Room (INT)
2	DF	SCO	Perry Kitchen
3	DF	USA	Josh Williams
4	DF	GHA	Jonathan Mensah
5	DF	NED	Vito Wormgoor (INT)
6	MF	USA	Darlington Nagbe (Captain; DP)
7	MF	POR	Pedro Santos (INT)
8	MF	BRA	Artur
9	FW	TRI	Kevin Molino
10	MF	ARM	Lucas Zelarayán (INT; DP)
11	FW	USA	Gyasi Zardes (DP)
12	MF	CRC	Luis Díaz (INT; YDP)
13	GK	USA	Eric Dick (SUP)
14	DF	CRC	Waylon Francis
16	MF	USA	Isaiah Parente (SUP; HGP)

No.	Pos.	Nation	Player
17	DF	USA	Marlon Hairston (SUP)
18	MF	CAN	Liam Fraser (SUP; HGP)
19	DF	ARG	Milton Valenzuela
20	FW	ROU	Alexandru Mățan (INT; U22)
21	MF	USA	Aidan Morris (SUP; HGP)
22	MF	HAI	Derrick Etienne Jr. (SUP; HGP)
23	MF	USA	Grant Lillard (SUP; HGP)
24	GK	USA	Evan Bush (SUP)
25	DF	GHA	Harrison Afful
26	DF	USA	Saad Abdul-Salaam (SUP)
27	FW	ESP	Miguel Berry (SUP)
30	DF	USA	Aboubacar Keita (SUP; HGP)
31	DF	CPV	Steven Moreira (INT)
33	FW	USA	Erik Hurtado
99	FW	ENG	Bradley Wright-Phillips

=== Out on loan ===
Note: Flags indicate national team as defined under FIFA eligibility rules; some limited exceptions apply. Players may hold more than one non-FIFA nationality.

No.	Pos.	Nation	Player
18	MF	USA	Sebastian Berhalter (on loan to Austin FC)

== Technical Staff ==
Position	Staff
President & General Manager	(United States) Tim Bezbatchenko
Head Coach	(United States) Caleb Porter
Technical Director, VP of Soccer Operations	(Canada) Pat Onstad
Vice President, Soccer Administration & Operations	(United States) Jaime McMillan
Director of Player Personnel and Strategy	(France) Issa Tall
Assistant General Manager, Crew 2 General Manager	(Canada) Corey Wray
Director of Scouting	(Scotland) Neil McGuinness
Assistant Coach	(United States) Ben Cross
Assistant Coach	(United States) Tim Hanley
Assistant Coach	(Saint Vincent and the Grenadines) Ezra Hendrickson
Assistant Coach	(Uruguay) Pablo Moreira
First Team Video Coach Analyst	(United States) Blair Gavin
Head of Sport Science & Medicine	(United States) Chris Shenberger
Director of Performance	(United States) Daniel Hicker
Data Analyst	(United States) Alex Mysiw
Fitness Coach	(Portugal) Federico Pizzuto
Assistant Strength & Conditioning Coach	(United States) Kelly Roderick
Head Athletic Trainer	(United States) Chris Rumsey
Assistant Athletic Trainer	(United States) Catherine Hill
Assistant Athletic Trainer	(United States) Daniel Givens
Head Equipment Manager	(United States) David Brauzer
Assistant Equipment Manager	(United States) Ron Meadors
Manager of Team Operations	(United States) Julio Velasquez
Player Care Coordinator	(United States) McKenzie Bostic

Source: []

== Non-competitive ==
=== Preseason ===
The Crew played preseason matches in Florida. They brought six academy players with them to training camp: Anthony Samways, Elton Chifamba, Noah Hall, Samuel Sarver, TJ Presthus and Levi Stephens

March 24 Friendly	Columbus Crew SC	0–3	New York City FC	St. Petersburg, FL
7:00 PM EDT		Report	Medina 3'; Moralez 65'; Tajouri-Shradi 86'	Stadium: Al Lang Stadium; Attendance: 0

March 27 Friendly	Columbus Crew SC	0–1	Orlando City SC	Orlando, FL
7:00 PM EDT		Report	Akindele	Stadium: Osceola Heritage Park; Attendance: 0

March 31 Friendly	Columbus Crew SC	2–5	Minnesota United FC	Bay Lake, FL
11:00 AM EDT	Morris 76'; Wright-Phillips 88'	Report	Goal	Stadium: ESPN Wide World of Sports Complex

April 1 Friendly	Columbus Crew SC	2–4	Toronto FC	Bay Lake, FL
7:00 PM EDT	Santos 18'; Díaz 86'	Report; Report	Altidore 35'; Mullins 59'; Auro Jr. 64' (pen.); Perruzza 82'	Stadium: ESPN Wide World of Sports Complex; Attendance: 0

== Competitive ==
=== Overview ===
Competition	First match	Last match	Starting round	Final position	Record							
Competition	First match	Last match	Starting round	Final position	Pld	W	D	L	GF	GA	GD	Win %
Major League Soccer	April 18, 2021	November 7, 2021	Matchday 1	17th	34	13	8	13	46	45	+1	38.24
CONCACAF Champions League	April 8, 2021	May 5, 2021	Round of 16	Quarterfinals	4	2	1	1	7	5	+2	50.00
2021 Campeones Cup	September 29, 2021	September 29, 2021	Final	Winner	1	1	0	0	2	0	+2	100.00
Total					39	16	9	14	55	50	+5	41.03

Source: Competitions

=== MLS ===
==== Standings ====
===== Eastern Conference =====
Pos	Team	Pld	W	L	T	GF	GA	GD	Pts	Qualification
7	New York Red Bulls	34	13	12	9	39	33	+6	48	MLS Cup First Round
8	D.C. United	34	14	15	5	56	54	+2	47	
9	Columbus Crew	34	13	13	8	46	45	+1	47	
10	CF Montréal	34	12	12	10	46	44	+2	46	
11	Inter Miami CF	34	12	17	5	36	53	−17	41	

Source: MLS
Rules for classification: 1) points; 2) total wins; 3) total goal differential; 4) total goals scored; 5) fewer disciplinary points; 6) away goal differential; 7) away goals scored; 8) home goals differential; 9) home goals scored; 10) coin toss (2 clubs tied) or drawing of lots (≥3 clubs tied)

===== Overall table =====
Pos	Team	Pld	W	L	T	GF	GA	GD	Pts	Qualification
15	LA Galaxy	34	13	12	9	50	54	−4	48	
16	D.C. United	34	14	15	5	56	54	+2	47	
17	Columbus Crew	34	13	13	8	46	45	+1	47	
18	CF Montréal	34	12	12	10	46	44	+2	46	CONCACAF Champions League
19	Los Angeles FC	34	12	13	9	53	51	+2	45	

Source: MLS
Rules for classification: 1) points; 2) total wins; 3) total goal differential; 4) total goals scored; 5) fewer disciplinary points; 6) away goal differential; 7) away goals scored; 8) home goals differential; 9) home goals scored; 10) coin toss (2 clubs tied) or drawing of lots (≥3 clubs tied)

==== Results summary ====
Overall								Home						Away					
Pld	Pts	W	L	T	GF	GA	GD	W	L	T	GF	GA	GD	W	L	T	GF	GA	GD
34	47	13	13	8	46	45	+1	10	4	3	33	23	+10	3	9	5	13	22	−9

Source: MLS standings
Pld = Matches played; Pts = Points; W = Matches won; T = Matches tied; L = Matches lost; GF = Goals for; GA = Goals against; GD = Goal difference

==== Results by round ====
Round	1	2	3	4	5	6	7	8	9	10	11	12	13	14	15	16	17	18	19	20	21	22	23	24	25	26	27	28	29	30	31	32	33	34
Stadium	H	A	H	A	A	A	H	H	A	A	H	A	H	H	A	A	H	H	A	A	H	H	A	A	H	A	H	A	H	A	H	H	A	H
Result	D	D	W	L	L	W	W	W	L	D	D	D	W	D	W	L	L	L	L	L	L	W	L	L	W	D	W	L	W	D	L	W	W	W

Source: Columbus schedule
A = Away; H = Home; W = Win; D = Draw; L = Loss

==== Match results ====
On March 10, 2021 the league announced the home openers for every club, with Columbus playing Philadelphia Union at Historic Crew Stadium.

April 18 1	Columbus Crew SC	0–0	Philadelphia Union	Columbus, OH
5:30 PM EDT	Díaz (yellow card) 56'; Kitchen (yellow card) 64'	Report	Glesnes (yellow card) 40'; Monteiro (yellow card) 61'; Santos (yellow card) 75'; Bedoya (yellow card) 89'	Stadium: Historic Crew Stadium; Attendance: 5,180; Referee: Ramy Touchan; Assistant referees: Kathryn Nesbitt; Eric Boria; Fourth official: Ismir Pekmic

May 1 2	CF Montréal	0–0	Columbus Crew SC	Fort Lauderdale, FL
3:00 PM EDT		Report		Stadium: DRV PNK Stadium; Attendance: 0 Referee: Timothy Ford; Assistant referees: Corey Rockwell; Kevin Klinger; Fourth official: Silviu Petrescu
Note: Due to COVID-19 Cross-border travel restrictions, the match was played at DRV PNK Stadium where Montreal played as the home team.

May 8 3	Columbus Crew SC	3–1	D.C. United	Columbus, OH
1:30 PM EDT	Zelarayán 20'; Afful (yellow card) 29'; Williams (yellow card) 30'; Francis (yellow card) 58'; Brillant 63' (o.g.); Alfaro 83' (o.g.)	Report	Asad (yellow card) 42'; Kamara 82'	Stadium: Historic Crew Stadium; Attendance: 5,180; Referee: Silviu Petrescu; Assistant referees: Cory Richardson; Chantal Boudreau; Fourth official: Sergii Demianchuk

May 12 4	Toronto FC	2–0	Columbus SC	Orlando, FL
7:00 PM EDT	Bradley 13'; Delgado (yellow card) 46'; Bono (yellow card) 54'; Altidore 87', (yellow card) 90+3'	Report	Keita (yellow card) 89'; Mensah (yellow card) 90+2'	Stadium: Exploria Stadium; Attendance: 0 Referee: Fotis Bazakos; Assistant referees: Adam Garner; T.J. Zablocki; Fourth official: Ted Unkel
Note: Due to COVID-19 Cross-border travel restrictions, the match was played at Exploria Stadium where Toronto played as the home team.

May 16 5	New England Revolution	1–0	Columbus SC	Foxborough, MA
6:00 PM EDT	Kaptoum (yellow card) 80'; Bell (yellow card) 83'; Buksa 86'	Report	Francis (yellow card) 71'	Stadium: Gillette Stadium; Referee: Robert Sibiga; Assistant referees: Brian Poeschel; Tom Felice; Fourth official: Adam Kilpatrick

May 22 6	New York City FC	1–2	Columbus Crew	Harrison, NJ
7:30 PM EDT	Tajouri-Shradi 18'; Chanot (yellow card) 89'; Ibeagha (yellow card) 90+4'	Report	Santos (yellow card) 25'; Artur (yellow card) 46'; Zelarayán 82', 90+5'	Stadium: Red Bull Arena; Attendance: 3,154; Referee: Drew Fischer; Assistant referees: Logan Brown; Cory Richardson; Fourth official: John Griggs
Note: The match was held at Red Bull Arena due to scheduling conflicts at New York City FC's home stadium, Yankee Stadium. New York City FC played as the home team for this match.

May 29 7	Columbus Crew	2–1	Toronto FC	Columbus, OH
3:00 PM EDT	Díaz 12'; Zardes 21'	Report	Akinola 52'	Stadium: Historic Crew Stadium; Attendance: 5,700; Referee: Allen Chapman; Assistant referees: Eric Boria; C.J. Morgante; Fourth official: Marcos de Oliveira

June 19 8	Columbus Crew	2–0	Chicago Fire FC	Columbus, OH
7:30 PM EDT	Zardes 17', 34'; Etienne (yellow card) 21'; Williams (yellow card) 25'	Report	Herbers (yellow card) 44'; Medrán (yellow card) 65'	Stadium: Historic Crew Stadium; Attendance: 20,064; Referee: Alex Chilowicz; Assistant referees: Matt Nelson; Jeffrey Swartzel; Fourth official: Matthew Thompson

June 23 9	Philadelphia Union	1–0	Columbus Crew	Chester, PA
7:30 PM EDT	Monteiro 24'; Real (yellow card) 74'; Flach (yellow card) 84'	Report	Mățan (yellow card) 43'; Wormgoor (yellow card) 51'	Stadium: Subaru Park; Attendance: 16,234; Referee: Joe Dickerson; Assistant referees: Nick Uranga; Jose Da Silva; Fourth official: Jonathan Bilinski

June 27 10	Austin FC	0–0	Columbus Crew	Austin, TX
8:00 PM EDT	Fagúndez (yellow card) 90+5'	Report	Afful (yellow card) 35'	Stadium: Q2 Stadium; Attendance: 20,738; Referee: Ted Unkel; Assistant referees: Mike Rottersman; Brian Poeschel; Fourth official: Tori Penso

July 3 11	Columbus Crew	2–2	New England Revolution	Columbus, OH
5:00 PM EDT	Zardes 39'; Nagbe (yellow card) 68'; Farrell 69' (o.g.); Mensah (yellow card) 75'; Santos (yellow card) 79'	Report	Buchanan 13'; Bou 30'; Jones (yellow card) 53'	Stadium: Lower.com Field; Attendance: 20,407; Referee: Alan Kelly; Assistant referees: Cameron Blanchard; Jeremy Kieso; Fourth official: Sergii Demianchuk

July 9 12	FC Cincinnati	2–2	Columbus Crew	Cincinnati, OH
7:30 PM EDT	Castillo 1', (yellow card) 28'; Acosta 24'; Kubo (yellow card) 32'; Cameron (yellow card) 45+7'; Vallecilla (yellow card) 61'; Barreal (yellow card) 72'; Stanko (yellow card) 88'	Report	Afful (yellow card) 17' (yellow-red card) 42': Mensah (yellow card) 39'; Zelarayán 45+1'; Berry 77'	Stadium: TQL Stadium; Attendance: 25,701; Referee: Kevin Stott; Assistant referees: Cory Richardson; Jeffrey Swartzel; Fourth official: Guido Gonzalez Jr.

July 17 13	Columbus Crew	2–1	New York City FC	Columbus, OH
7:30 PM EDT	Abdul-Salaam (yellow card) 9'; Hairston (yellow card) 37'; Nagbe 45+3'; Zelarayán 62'; Santos (yellow card) 77'; Francis (yellow card) 79'	Report	Chanot (yellow card) 31'; Medina (yellow card) 34' (goal) 47'; Acevedo (yellow card) 39'; Thórarinsson (yellow card) 51'	Stadium: Lower.com Field; Attendance: 19,113; Referee: Ramy Touchan; Assistant referees: Eric Boria; Claudiu Badea; Fourth official: Danielle Chesky

July 21 14	Columbus Crew	0–0	Nashville SC	Columbus, OH
7:30 PM EDT	Kitchen (yellow card) 18'; Hurtado (yellow card) 43'	Report	LaGrassa (yellow card) 21'	Stadium: Lower.com Field; Attendance: 18,395; Referee: Rosendo Mendoza; Assistant referees: Brian Poeschel; Jeffrey Swartzel; Fourth official: Elton Garcia

July 24 15	Atlanta United FC	0–1	Columbus Crew	Atlanta, GA
3:30 PM EDT		Report	Hurtado (yellow card) 44'; Mensah 65'; Francis (yellow card) 90+2'	Stadium: Mercedes-Benz Stadium; Attendance: 67,507; Referee: Robert Sibiga; Assistant referees: Jason White; Adam Wienckowski; Fourth official: Elijio Arreguin

July 30 16	New York City FC	4–1	Columbus Crew	New York, NY
7:30 PM EDT	Castellanos 14', (yellow card) 55'; Rodríguez 22'; Thiago 35', (yellow card) 36'; Thórarinsson (yellow card) 41'; Parks 51'; Medina (yellow card) 69'	Report	Santos (yellow card) 49', (goal) 90+7' (pen.)	Stadium: Yankee Stadium; Referee: Alan Kelly; Assistant referees: Matt Nelson; Gjovalin Bori; Fourth official: Elton Garcia

August 4 17	Columbus Crew	2–4	D.C. United	Columbus, OH
7:30 PM EDT	Keita (yellow card) 24'; Etienne (yellow card) 30'; Mesah (yellow card) 45+1'; Molino 65'; Zelarayán 71'	Report	Kamara 19'; Reyna 40', 74'; Kamara 45+3' (pen.); Alfaro (yellow card) 66'	Stadium: Lower.com Field; Attendance: 18,398; Referee: Victor Rivas; Assistant referees: Andrew Bigelow; Meghan Mullen; Fourth official: Kevin Broadley

August 7 18	Columbus Crew	2–3	Atlanta United FC	Columbus, OH
7:30 PM EDT	Mensah 37'; Santos 90+1' (pen.); Room (yellow card) 90+7'	Report	Barco 5', 35' (pen.); Sosa (yellow card) 45+3'; Moreno 65' (pen.); Walkes (yellow card) 66'	Stadium: Lower.com Field; Attendance: 20,094; Referee: Allen Chapman; Assistant referees: Brian Dunn; Jeff Hosking; Fourth official: Sergii Demianchuk

August 15 19	Chicago Fire FC	1–0	Columbus Crew	Chicago, IL
6:00 PM EDT	Stojanovic 77'	Report	Etienne (yellow card) 27'	Stadium: Soldier Field; Attendance: 13,005; Referee: Nima Saghafi; Assistant referees: Ian McKay; Eric Boria; Fourth official: Natalie Simon

August 18 20	New York Red Bulls	1–0	Columbus Crew	Harrison, NJ
8:00 PM EDT	Tolkin 33'; Klimala (yellow card) 55'	Report	Hurtado (yellow card) 84'	Stadium: Red Bull Arena; Attendance: 10,002; Referee: Chris Penso; Assistant referees: Jeremy Hanson; Gianni Facchini; Fourth official: John Griggs

August 21 21	Columbus Crew	1–2	Seattle Sounders FC	Columbus, OH
5:30 PM EDT	Wright-Phillips 77'; Díaz (yellow card) 85'	Report	Ruidíaz (yellow card) 79'; Arreaga 88'; Bruin 89'	Stadium: Lower.com Field; Attendance: 19,401; Referee: Joe Dickerson; Assistant referees: Peter Balciunas; Andrew Bigelow; Fourth official: Baldomero Toledo

August 27 22	Columbus Crew	3–2	FC Cincinnati	Columbus, OH
6:30 PM EDT	Zelarayán 45'; Berry 81', 83'	Report	Matarrita 45+3'; Atanga 74'	Stadium: Lower.com Field; Attendance: 19,949; Referee: Robert Sibiga; Assistant referees: Jason White; Ian McKay; Fourth official: Silviu Petrescu

September 4 23	Orlando City SC	3–2	Columbus Crew	Orlando, FL
7:30 pm	Dike 26'; Van der Water 29'; Urso (yellow card) 42'. (goal) 69'; DeZart (yellow card) 51'	Report	Carlos 52' (o.g.); Berry 54'	Stadium: Exploria Stadium; Attendance: 15,366; Referee: Armando Villarreal; Assistant referees: Kevin Klinger; Logan Brown; Fourth official: Marcos de Oliveira

September 11 24	Inter Miami CF	1–0	Columbus Crew	Fort Lauderdale, FL
4:00PM EDT	Higuaín 16'	Report	Afful (yellow card) 10'; Zelarayán (yellow card) 12'; Wormgoor (yellow card) 82'	Stadium: DRV PNK Stadium; Attendance: 15,014; Referee: Alan Kelly; Assistant referees: Corey Parker; Jose Da Silva; Fourth official: Mathew Corrigan

September 14 25	Columbus Crew	2–1	New York Red Bulls	Columbus, OH
7:30 PM EDT	Nagbe 74'; Berry 88'	Report	Klimala 25'; Yearwood (yellow card) 33'	Stadium: Lower.com Field; Attendance: 17,358; Referee: Jair Marrufo; Assistant referees: Peter Balciunas; Jeffrey Greeson; Fourth official: Fotis Bazakos

September 18 26	New England Revolution	1–1	Columbus Crew	Foxborough, MA
7:00 PM EDT	Buksa 62'	Report	Zardes 58'; Abdul-Salaam (yellow card) 65'; Parente (yellow card) 77'	Stadium: Gillette Stadium; Attendance: 19,004; Referee: Allen Chapman; Assistant referees: Andrew Bigelow; Gjovalin Bori; Fourth official: Robert Sibiga

September 25 27	Columbus Crew	2–1	CF Montréal	Columbus, OH
7:30 PM EDT	Williams (yellow card) 39'; Zardes 44', 62'; Etienne (yellow card) 56'	Report	Quioto 90+2'	Stadium: Lower.com Field; Attendance: 19,423; Referee: Nima Saghafi; Assistant referees: Corey Parker; Adam Garner; Fourth official: Baldomero Toledo

October 3 28	Philadelphia Union	3–0	Columbus Crew	Chester, PA
4:00 PM EDT	Elliott 25'; Wagner (yellow card) 35' (yellow-red card) 64'; Bedoya 46'; Powell (yellow card) 74'; Santos (yellow card) 78'; Flach 89'	Report	Santos (yellow card) 66'	Stadium: Subaru Park; Attendance: 15,578; Referee: Victor Rivas; Assistant referees: Peter Manikowski; Brian Poeschel; Fourth official: Elvis Osmanovic

October 16 29	Columbus Crew	4–0	Inter Miami CF	Columbus, OH
6:00 PM EDT	Zardes 39', 64'; Santos 44'; Wormgoor (yellow card) 56'; Pírez 83' (o.g.)	Report	Higuaín (yellow card) 16': Leerdam (yellow card) 68'; Robinson (yellow card) 68'; Makoun (yellow card) 76'; Carranza (yellow card) 90+1'	Stadium: Lower.com Field; Attendance: 19,338; Referee: Rubiel Vazquez; Assistant referees: Claudiu Badea; Kyle Atkins; Fourth official: Guido Gonzalez Jr.

October 20 30	Nashville SC	1–1	Columbus Crew	Nashville, TN
8:30 PM EDT	Mukhtar 77', (yellow card) 90'; Haakenson (yellow card) 90+5'	Report	Nagbe (yellow card) 71'; Zelarayán 75'	Stadium: Nissan Stadium; Attendance: 18,381; Referee: Alex Chilowicz; Assistant referees: Eric Weisbrod; Chris Elliott; Fourth official: Silviu Petrescu

October 23 31	Columbus Crew	1–2	New York Red Bulls	Columbus, OH
6:00 PM EDT	Berry 18'	Report	Cásseres 7'; Yearwood (yellow card) 70'; Nealis 87'	Stadium: Lower.com Field; Attendance: 17,891; Referee: Alan Kelly; Assistant referees: Oscar Mitchell-Carvalho; Cory Richardson; Fourth official: Adam Kilpatrick

October 27 32	Columbus Crew	3–2	Orlando City SC	Columbus, OH
7:30 PM EDT	Berry 20'; Etienne 31'; Mensah (yellow card) 45'; Zelarayán 61'; Valenzuela (yellow card) 90+5'	Report	Mendez (yellow card) 13'; Dike 52' (pen.); Smith (yellow card) 57'; Jansson 90+2'	Stadium: Lower.com Field; Attendance: 16,676; Referee: Joe Dickerson; Assistant referees: Andrew Bigelow; Diego Blas; Fourth official: Matthew Thompson

October 30 33	D.C. United	1–3	Columbus Crew	Washington, DC
7:30 PM EDT	Arriola 3', (yellow card) 32'; Martins (yellow card) 79'	Report	Valenzuela (yellow card) 42'; Zelarayán 45' (pen.), 76'; Santos 66'	Stadium: Audi Field; Attendance: 16,787; Referee: Drew Fischer; Assistant referees: Kathryn Nesbitt; Brian Poeschel; Fourth official: Lukasz Szpala

November 7 34	Columbus Crew	2–0	Chicago Fire FC	Columbus, OH
3:30 PM EST	Zelarayán 31'; Berry 58'	Report	Navarro (yellow card) 59'; Offor (yellow card) 62'; Espinoza (yellow card) 88'; Ivanov (yellow card) 89'	Stadium: Lower.com Field; Attendance: 19,351; Referee: Timothy Ford; Assistant referees: Adam Garner; Matt Nelson; Fourth official: Chris Ruska

=== MLS Cup Playoffs ===
The Columbus Crew failed to qualify for the playoffs in this season.

=== CONCACAF Champions League ===
==== Round of 16 ====
April 8 Leg 1	Real Estelí (Nicaragua)	0–4	(United States) Columbus Crew SC	Estelí, Nicaragua
8:00 PM EDT	Silva (yellow card) 11'; Barrera (yellow card) 28'; García (yellow card) 44'; Acevedo (yellow card) 85'	Report	Zardes 19', 33'; Mensah 26', (yellow card) 28'; Santos 45+1' (pen.); Morris (yellow card) 55'; Nagbe (yellow card) 61'; Francis (yellow card) 79'	Stadium: Estadio Independencia; Referee: Selvin Brown (Honduras); Assistant referees: Cristian Ramírez (Honduras); Keyzel Corrales (Honduras); Fourth official: Nelson Salgado (Honduras)

April 15 Leg 2	Columbus Crew SC (United States)	1–0 (5–0 agg.)	(Nicaragua) Real Estelí	Columbus, OH
8:00 PM EDT	Zelarayán (yellow card) 47'; Wright-Phillips 86'	Report	López (yellow card) 83'	Stadium: Historic Crew Stadium; Referee: Keylor Herrera Villalobos (Costa Rica); Assistant referees: Juan Mora (Costa Rica); Victor Ramírez (Costa Rica); Fourth official: Ricardo Montero (Costa Rica)

==== Quarterfinals ====
April 28 Leg 1	Columbus Crew SC (United States)	2–2	(Mexico) C.F. Monterrey	Columbus, OH
8:30 PM EDT	Zelarayán (yellow card) 13', (goal) 87'; Zardes (yellow card) 51'; Valenzuela 66'	Report	Loba 9'; Mora (yellow card) 51'; Alvarado 90+3'	Stadium: Historic Crew Stadium; Referee: Juan Gabriel Calderón (Costa Rica); Assistant referees: Andres Arrieta (Costa Rica); Gerson Lopez (Guatemala); Fourth official: Bryan López (Guatemala)

May 5 Leg 2	C.F. Monterrey (Mexico)	3–0 (5–2 agg.)	(United States) Columbus Crew SC	Monterrey, Mexico
8:00 PM EDT	Meza 3', 26'; Sánchez (yellow card) 37'; Montes (yellow card) 57'; Layún (yellow card) 63', (goal) 71'	Report		Stadium: Estadio BBVA; Referee: Daneon Parchment (Jamaica); Assistant referees: Ojay Duhaney (Jamaica); Damion Williams (Jamaica); Fourth official: Oshane Nation (Jamaica)

=== Campeones Cup ===
September 29 Final	Columbus Crew (United States)	2–0	(Mexico) Cruz Azul	Columbus, OH
8:00 EDT	Angulo 4' (o.g.); Díaz (yellow card) 66'; Mensah 74'	Report	Aguilar (yellow card) 32'; Corona (yellow card) 32'; Domínguez (yellow card) 32'; Baca (yellow card) 45+1'; Guillermo Fernández (yellow card) 77'; Escobar (yellow card) 89'	Stadium: Lower.com Field; Attendance: 18,026; Referee: Oshane Nation (Jamaica); Assistant referees: Ojay Duhaney (Jamaica); Irrots Appleton (Antigua and Barbuda); Fourth official: Reon Radix (Grenada)

=== U.S. Open Cup ===
On July 20, US Soccer announced that the tournament would be cancelled for 2021 and would resume in 2022.

== Statistics ==
=== Appearances and goals ===
Under "Apps" for each section, the first number represents the number of starts, and the second number represents appearances as a substitute.

No.	Pos	Nat	Player	Total		MLS		CONCACAF Champions League		Campeones Cup	
No.	Pos	Nat	Player	Apps	Goals	Apps	Goals	Apps	Goals	Apps	Goals
1	GK	(Curaçao) CUW	Eloy Room	34	0	30+0	0	4+0	0	0+0	0
2	MF	(United States) USA	Perry Kitchen	7	0	3+2	0	1+1	0	0+0	0
3	DF	(United States) USA	Josh Williams	23	0	14+4	0	3+1	0	1+0	0
4	DF	(Ghana) GHA	Jonathan Mensah	32	4	28+1	2	2+0	1	1+0	1
5	DF	(Netherlands) NED	Vito Wormgoor	17	0	16+1	0	0+0	0	0+0	0
6	MF	(United States) USA	Darlington Nagbe	37	2	33+0	2	3+0	0	1+0	0
7	MF	(Portugal) POR	Pedro Santos	37	5	30+2	4	3+1	1	1+0	0
8	MF	(Brazil) BRA	Artur	10	0	5+1	0	3+1	0	0+0	0
9	FW	(Trinidad and Tobago) TRI	Kevin Molino	11	1	7+4	1	0+0	0	0+0	0
10	MF	(Armenia) ARM	Lucas Zelarayán	36	13	28+4	12	2+1	1	1+0	0
11	FW	(United States) USA	Gyasi Zardes	24	11	18+3	9	3+0	2	0+0	0
12	MF	(Costa Rica) CRC	Luis Díaz	24	1	11+8	1	4+0	0	0+1	0
13	GK	(United States) USA	Eric Dick	0	0	0+0	0	0+0	0	0+0	0
14	DF	(Costa Rica) CRC	Waylon Francis	27	0	14+9	0	2+2	0	0+0	0
16	MF	(United States) USA	Isaiah Parente	9	0	2+4	0	1+2	0	0+0	0
17	DF	(United States) USA	Marlon Hairston	22	0	16+5	0	0+0	0	0+1	0
18	MF	(United States) USA	Sebastian Berhalter	0	0	0+0	0	0+0	0	0+0	0
18	MF	(Canada) CAN	Liam Fraser	24	0	11+12	0	0+0	0	1+0	0
19	DF	(Argentina) ARG	Milton Valenzuela	18	1	12+2	0	2+1	1	0+1	0
20	MF	(Romania) ROU	Alexandru Mățan	30	0	9+19	0	0+2	0	0+0	0
21	MF	(United States) USA	Aidan Morris	2	0	0+0	0	2+0	0	0+0	0
22	MF	(Haiti) HAI	Derrick Etienne Jr.	32	1	21+8	1	2+0	0	1+0	0
23	DF	(United States) USA	Grant Lillard	1	0	0+0	0	0+1	0	0+0	0
24	GK	(United States) USA	Evan Bush	5	0	4+0	0	0+0	0	1+0	0
25	DF	(Ghana) GHA	Harrison Afful	30	0	21+5	0	3+0	0	0+1	0
26	DF	(United States) USA	Saad Abdul-Salaam	19	0	7+11	0	0+1	0	0+0	0
27	FW	(Spain) ESP	Miguel Berry	21	8	9+9	8	1+1	0	1+0	0
30	DF	(United States) USA	Aboubacar Keita	19	0	10+6	0	2+0	0	1+0	0
31	DF	(Cape Verde) CPV	Steven Moreira	8	0	6+1	0	0+0	0	1+0	0
33	FW	(United States) USA	Erik Hurtado	9	0	3+6	0	0+0	0	0+0	0
99	FW	(England) ENG	Bradley Wright-Phillips	26	2	6+15	1	1+3	1	0+1	0
			Own goal	0	6	-	5	-	0	-	1
Players who left Columbus during the season:
28	GK	(United States) USA	Matt Lampson	0	0	0+0	0	0+0	0	0+0	0

=== Disciplinary record ===
No.	Pos.	Name	MLS		CONCACAF Champions League		Campeones Cup		Total	
No.	Pos.	Name	Booked	Sent off (straight red)	Booked	Sent off (straight red)	Booked	Sent off (straight red)	Booked	Sent off (straight red)
1	GK	(Curaçao) Eloy Room	1	0	0	0	0	0	1	0
2	MF	(United States) Perry Kitchen	2	0	0	0	0	0	2	0
3	DF	(United States) Josh Williams	3	0	0	0	0	0	3	0
4	DF	(Ghana) Jonathan Mensah	5	0	1	0	0	0	6	0
5	DF	(Netherlands) Vito Wormgoor	3	0	0	0	0	0	3	0
6	MF	(United States) Darlington Nagbe	2	0	1	0	0	0	3	0
7	MF	(Portugal) Pedro Santos	5	0	0	0	0	0	5	0
8	MF	(Brazil) Artur	1	0	0	0	0	0	1	0
9	FW	(Trinidad and Tobago) Kevin Molino	0	0	0	0	0	0	0	0
10	MF	(Armenia) Lucas Zelarayán	1	0	2	0	0	0	3	0
11	FW	(United States) Gyasi Zardes	0	0	1	0	0	0	1	0
12	MF	(Costa Rica) Luis Díaz	3	0	0	0	1	0	4	0
13	GK	(United States) Eric Dick	0	0	0	0	0	0	0	0
14	DF	(Costa Rica) Waylon Francis	4	0	1	0	0	0	5	0
16	MF	(United States) Isaiah Parente	1	0	0	0	0	0	1	0
17	DF	(United States) Marlon Hairston	1	0	0	0	0	0	1	0
18	MF	(United States) Sebastian Berhalter	0	0	0	0	0	0	0	0
19	DF	(Argentina) Milton Valenzuela	2	0	0	0	0	0	2	0
20	MF	(Ghana) Alexandru Mățan	1	0	0	0	0	0	1	0
21	MF	(United States) Aidan Morris	0	0	1	0	0	0	1	0
22	MF	(Haiti) Derrick Etienne Jr.	4	0	0	0	0	0	4	0
23	DF	(United States) Grant Lillard	0	0	0	0	0	0	0	0
24	GK	(United States) Evan Bush	0	0	0	0	0	0	0	0
25	DF	(Ghana) Harrison Afful	3	1	0	0	0	0	3	1
26	MF	(United States) Saad Abdul-Salaam	2	0	0	0	0	0	2	0
27	FW	(Spain) Miguel Berry	0	0	0	0	0	0	0	0
30	DF	(United States) Aboubacar Keita	2	0	0	0	0	0	2	0
31	DF	(Cape Verde) Steven Moreira	2	0	0	0	0	0	0	0
33	FW	(United States) Erik Hurtado	3	0	0	0	0	0	3	0
99	FW	(England) Bradley Wright-Phillips	0	0	0	0	0	0	0	0
Players who left Columbus during the season:
28	FW	(United States) Matt Lampson	0	0	0	0	0	0	0	0

=== Clean sheets ===
No.	Name	MLS	CONCACAF Champions League	Campeones Cup	Total	Games Played
1	(Curaçao) Eloy Room	7	2	0	9	34
13	(United States) Eric Dick	0	0	0	0	0
24	(United States) Evan Bush	1	0	1	2	5
Players who left Columbus during the season:
28	(United States) Matt Lampson	0	0	0	0	0

== Transfers ==
=== In ===
Pos.	Player	Transferred from	Fee/notes	Date	Source
DF	(Costa Rica) Waylon Francis	(United States) Columbus Crew SC	Signed as a free agent	January 6, 2021	
MF	(Trinidad and Tobago) Kevin Molino	(United States) Minnesota United FC	Signed as a free agent	January 7, 2021	
GK	(United States) Eric Dick	(United States) Sporting Kansas City	Selected in Stage 2 of the 2020 MLS Re-Entry Draft	January 8, 2021	
MF	(United States) Isaiah Parente	(United States) Wake Forest	Signed to Homegrown Player deal.	January 11, 2021	
MF	(United States) Perry Kitchen	(United States) LA Galaxy	Signed as a free agent	January 28, 2021	
MF	(United States) Marlon Hairston	(United States) Minnesota United FC	Signed as a free agent	March 3, 2021	
MF	(Romania) Alexandru Mățan	(Romania) Viitorul Constanţa	Transfer, $1,800,000 transfer fee. Acquired under the MLS U-22 initiative.	March 8, 2021	
DF	(United States) Saad Abdul-Salaam	(United States) FC Cincinnati	Picked up off waivers	April 17, 2021	
FW	(United States) Erik Hurtado	(Canada) CF Montreal	Traded for $200,000 in 2021 general allocation money	July 8, 2021	
DF	(Cape Verde) Steven Moreira	(France) Toulouse FC	Signed as a free agent	August 23, 2021	
GK	(United States) Eloy Room	(United States) Columbus Crew	Signed a new contract	December 3, 2021	
MF	(United States) Pedro Santos	(United States) Columbus Crew	Signed a new contract	December 8, 2021	

=== Loan in ===
Pos.	Player	Parent club	Length/Notes	Beginning	End	Source
MF	(Canada) Liam Fraser	(Canada) Toronto FC	Sent $50,000 in 2021 general allocation money	May 3, 2021	December 11, 2021	

=== Out ===
Pos.	Player	Transferred to	Fee/notes	Date	Source
GK	(United States) Jon Kempin	(United States) D.C. United	Traded for third-round draft pick in the 2021 MLS SuperDraft	January 8, 2021	
MF	(Scotland) Chris Cadden	(Scotland) Hibernian F.C.	Transfer, Columbus retains a percentage of any future Transfer fee Hibernian receives	January 15, 2021	
GK	(United States) Matt Lampson	(United States) Hartford Athletic	Placed on waivers	August 25, 2021	
GK	(United States) Eloy Room	(United States) Columbus Crew	Contract expired	December 1, 2021	
MF	(United States) Pedro Santos	(United States) Columbus Crew	Contract expired	December 1, 2021	
DF	(Argentina) Milton Valenzuela	(Switzerland) FC Lugano	Contract expired	December 1, 2021	
GK	(United States) Evan Bush	(United States) Columbus Crew	Contract expired	December 1, 2021	
DF	(Ghana) Harrison Afful	(United States) Charlotte FC	Contract expired	December 1, 2021	
DF	(United States) Grant Lillard	(United States) Loudoun United	Contract expired	December 1, 2021	
GK	(United States) Eric Dick	(United States) Minnesota United FC	Option declined	December 1, 2021	
DF	(Costa Rica) Waylon Francis	(Costa Rica) CS Herediano	Option declined	December 1, 2021	
DF	(United States) Saad Abdul-Salaam	(United States) San Antonio FC	Option declined	December 1, 2021	
DF	(Netherlands) Vito Wormgoor	(Norway) IK Start	Option declined	December 1, 2021	
FW	(United States) Erik Hurtado	(United States) Columbus Crew	Option declined	December 1, 2021	
FW	(England) Bradley Wright-Phillips	Retired	Option declined	December 1, 2021	

=== Loans out ===
Pos.	Player	Loanee club	Length/Notes	Beginning	End	Source
MF	(United States) Sebastian Berhalter	(United States) Austin FC	Acquired $50,000 in 2021 general allocation money. The Crew will receive $50,000 in allocation money if Berhalter meets certain performance conditions in 2021. Austin FC retains the option to trade for the rights on a permanent basis.	March 3, 2021	November 7, 2021	
FW	(Spain) Miguel Berry	(United States) San Diego Loyal SC	Columbus retains the right to terminate the loan at any time.	May 28, 2021	June 29, 2021	
GK	(United States) Eric Dick	(United States) Indy Eleven	Columbus retains the right to terminate the loan at any time.	June 24, 2021	August 22, 2021	

=== MLS Draft picks ===
Draft picks are not automatically signed to the team roster. Only those who are signed to a contract will be listed as transfers in. The picks for Columbus Crew are listed below:

2021 Columbus Crew SuperDraft Picks
Round	Pick	Player	Position	College
1	27	(Senegal) Justin Malou	DF	San Diego
2	52	(United States) Joshua Jackson-Ketchup	DF	Ohio State

2021 Columbus Crew Re-Entry Draft Picks
Stage	Round	Pick	Player	Position	Team
2	1	4	(United States) Brady Scott	GK	Austin FC

== Awards ==
MLS Team of the Week
Week	Starters	Bench	Opponent(s)	Link
4	(Armenia) Lucas Zelarayán		(United States) D.C. United	
6	(Armenia) Lucas Zelarayán		(United States) New York City FC	
7	(Portugal) Pedro Santos		(Canada) Toronto FC	
8	(United States) Gyasi Zardes	(Portugal) Pedro Santos	(United States) Chicago Fire FC	
11		(United States) Gyasi Zardes	(United States) New England Revolution	
12	(Armenia) Lucas Zelarayán		(United States) FC Cincinnati	
13	(United States) Darlington Nagbe	(Curaçao) Eloy Room	(United States) New York City FC	
15	(Ghana) Jonathan Mensah	(Curaçao) Eloy Room	(United States) Atlanta United FC	
22	(Armenia) Lucas Zelarayán	(Spain) Miguel Berry	(United States) FC Cincinnati	
25	(Ghana) Jonathan Mensah		(United States) Inter Miami CF (United States) New York Red Bulls	
26	(Curaçao) Eloy Room		(United States) New England Revolution	
27	(United States) Gyasi Zardes		(Canada) CF Montréal	
30	(Portugal) Pedro Santos (United States) Gyasi Zardes		(United States) Inter Miami CF	
33	(Armenia) Lucas Zelarayán		(United States) New York Red Bulls (United States) Orlando City SC	
34	(Armenia) Lucas Zelarayán		(United States) D.C. United	
35	(Cape Verde) Steven Moreira		(United States) Chicago Fire FC	

=== MLS Player of the Week ===
Week	Player	Opponent	Link
6	(Armenia) Lucas Zelarayán	New York City FC	
27	(United States) Gyasi Zardes	CF Montréal	
30	(United States) Gyasi Zardes	Inter Miami CF	
34	(Armenia) Lucas Zelarayán	D.C. United	

=== MLS Goal of the Week ===
Week	Player	Opponent	Link
6	(Armenia) Lucas Zelarayán	New York City FC	
12	(Armenia) Lucas Zelarayán	D.C. United	
34	(Armenia) Lucas Zelarayán	D.C. United	

=== 2021 MLS All-Star Game ===
Starters

- MF Lucas Zelarayán

=== Postseason ===
MLS Fair Play Team Award

=== Crew Team Awards ===
- Most Valuable Player – Lucas Zelarayán
- Golden Boot Winner – Lucas Zelarayán
- Defender of the Year – Eloy Room
- Kirk Urso Heart Award – Miguel Berry
- Humanitarian of the Year – Josh Williams
- Academy Player of the Year – Tyler Crawford

== Kits ==
Home	Away

Type	Shirt	Shorts	Socks
Home	White	Gold	Gold
Away	Black	Black	Black
