= 2022 Columbus Crew season =

Columbus Crew
2022 season
- Investor-operators: Dee Haslam; Jimmy Haslam; JW Johnson; Whitney Johnson; Dr. Pete Edwards
- Head Coach: Caleb Porter
- Stadium: Lower.com Field
- Major League Soccer: Conference: 8th Overall: 16th
- MLS Cup playoffs: Did not qualify
- U.S. Open Cup: Third round
- Top goalscorer: League: Lucas Zelarayán (10); All: Lucas Zelarayán (10)
- Highest home attendance: 20,741 (7/17 v. CIN)
- Lowest home attendance: 16,116 (3/12 v. TOR)
- Average home league attendance: 19,237 (94.4%)
- Biggest win: CLB 4–0 VAN (2/26)
- Biggest defeat: CLB 0–2 ORL (4/16); NYCFC 2–0 CLB (5/14); CLB 0–2 LAFC (5/21)
Home colors	Away colors

The 2022 Columbus Crew season was the club's 27th season of existence and their 27th consecutive season in Major League Soccer, the top flight of soccer in the United States and Canada. The first match of the season was on February 26 against Vancouver Whitecaps FC. It was the fourth and final season under head coach Caleb Porter. This was the first season since 2017 without striker Gyasi Zardes, who departed to the Colorado Rapids

== Roster ==
As of August 9, 2022

Note: Flags indicate national team as defined under FIFA eligibility rules; some limited exceptions apply. Players may hold more than one non-FIFA nationality.

No.	Pos.	Nation	Player
1	GK	CUW	Eloy Room (INT)
2	MF	USA	Perry Kitchen
3	DF	USA	Josh Williams
4	DF	GHA	Jonathan Mensah (captain)
5	DF	AUS	Miloš Degenek (INT)
6	MF	USA	Darlington Nagbe (DP)
7	MF	POR	Pedro Santos (INT)
8	MF	BRA	Artur
9	FW	COL	Cucho Hernández (INT; DP)
10	MF	ARM	Lucas Zelarayán (INT; DP)
12	MF	CRC	Luis Díaz (INT)
13	FW	TTO	Kevin Molino
14	MF	GHA	Yaw Yeboah (INT)
16	MF	USA	Isaiah Parente (SUP; HGP)
17	DF	USA	Marlon Hairston

No.	Pos.	Nation	Player
19	FW	USA	Erik Hurtado
21	MF	USA	Aidan Morris (SUP; HGP)
22	MF	HAI	Derrick Etienne (SUP; HGP)
23	DF	USA	Jalil Anibaba
24	GK	USA	Evan Bush
25	MF	USA	Sean Zawadzki (SUP; HGP)
26	MF	NGR	James Igbekeme (On loan from Real Zaragoza) (INT)
28	GK	USA	Patrick Schulte (SUP; GA)
30	MF	USA	Will Sands (SUP; HGP)
31	DF	CPV	Steven Moreira (INT)
32	GK	USA	Brady Scott (SUP)
33	DF	USA	Jake Morris (SUP; HGP)
39	FW	CAN	Jacen Russell-Rowe (SUP; HGP)
41	DF	ALG	Mohamed Farsi (SUP)

=== Out on loan ===
Note: Flags indicate national team as defined under FIFA eligibility rules; some limited exceptions apply. Players may hold more than one non-FIFA nationality.

No.	Pos.	Nation	Player
20	MF	ROU	Alexandru Mățan (on loan to FC Rapid București)

== Technical Staff ==
Position	Staff
President & General Manager	(United States) Tim Bezbatchenko
Head Coach	(United States) Caleb Porter
Director of Scouting and Player Recruitment	(Scotland) Neil McGuinness
Vice President, Soccer Administration & Operations	(United States) Jaime McMillan
Technical Director	(United States) Marc Nicholls
Assistant GM, Player Personnel & Strategy	(France) Issa Tall
Assistant General Manager, Crew 2 General Manager	(Canada) Corey Wray
Assistant Coach	(United States) Blair Gavin
Assistant Coach	(United States) Tim Hanley
Assistant Coach	(Uruguay) Pablo Moreira
Assistant Coach	(United States) Eric Quill
Manager of Equipment Operations	(United States) David Brauzer
Assistant Equipment Manager	(United States) Ron Meadors
Manager of Team Operations	(United States) Julio Velasquez
Coordinator, Video Operations	(United States) Kyle Stump
Head of Sport Science & Medicine	(United States) Chris Shenberger
Director of Performance	(United States) Daniel Hicker
Strength and Conditioning Coach	(United States) Luis Jeronimo
Data Analyst	(United States) Alex Mysiw
Director, Fitness & End Stage Rehabilitation	(Portugal) Federico Pizzuto
Sports Dietitian	(United States) Kyla Cross
Head Athletic Trainer	(United States) Chris Rumsey
Assistant Athletic Trainer	(United States) Catherine Hill
Assistant Athletic Trainer	(United States) Daniel Givens

Source: []

== Non-competitive ==
=== Preseason ===
January 28 Friendly	Columbus Crew	4–0	Grenada national team	Fort Lauderdale, FL
	Goal	Report
Note: Closed-door.

February 12 Carolina Challenge Cup	Columbus Crew	1–1	Inter Miami CF	Mount Pleasant, SC
1:00pm	Etienne 87'	Report	McVey (yellow card) 41'; Lassiter 59'; Lowe (yellow card) 74'; Shea (yellow card) 89'	Stadium: Patriots Point Soccer Complex

February 15 Carolina Challenge Cup	Columbus Crew	0–0	Charlotte FC	Mount Pleasant, SC
5:00pm	Hairston (yellow card) 82'	Report	Hagardt (yellow card) 2'; Reyna (yellow card) 31'; Ortiz (yellow card) 31'; Franco (yellow card) 42'	Stadium: Patriots Point Soccer Complex

February 18 Carolina Challenge Cup	Charleston Battery	0–3	Columbus Crew	Mount Pleasant, SC
8:00 p.m.	Johnson (yellow card) 31'	Report	Mensah 9'; Santos (yellow card) 19', (goal) 49' (pen.); Zelarayán 27'	Stadium: Patriots Point Soccer Complex

== Competitive ==
=== Overview ===
Competition	First match	Last match	Starting round	Final position	Record							
Competition	First match	Last match	Starting round	Final position	Pld	W	D	L	GF	GA	GD	Win %
Major League Soccer	February 26, 2022	October 9, 2022	Matchday 1	16th	34	10	16	8	46	41	+5	29.41
U.S. Open Cup	April 19, 2022	April 19, 2022	Third Round	Third Round	1	0	0	1	1	2	−1	0.00
Total					35	10	16	9	47	43	+4	28.57

Source: Competitions

=== MLS ===
==== Standings ====
===== Eastern Conference =====
Pos	Team	Pld	W	L	T	GF	GA	GD	Pts	Qualification
6	Inter Miami CF	34	14	14	6	47	56	−9	48	Qualification for the first round
7	Orlando City SC	34	14	14	6	44	53	−9	48	Qualification for the first round & 2023 CONCACAF Champions League (Note: as 2022 U.S. Open Cup champions)
8	Columbus Crew	34	10	8	16	46	41	+5	46	
9	Charlotte FC	34	13	18	3	44	52	−8	42	
10	New England Revolution	34	10	12	12	47	50	−3	42	

Source: MLS
Rules for classification: 1) points; 2) total wins; 3) total goal differential; 4) total goals scored; 5) fewer disciplinary points; 6) away goal differential; 7) away goals scored; 8) home goals differential; 9) home goals scored; 10) coin toss (2 clubs tied) or drawing of lots (≥3 clubs tied)

===== Overall table =====
Pos	Team	Pld	W	L	T	GF	GA	GD	Pts	Qualification
14	Real Salt Lake	34	12	11	11	43	45	−2	47	
15	Portland Timbers	34	11	10	13	53	53	0	46	
16	Columbus Crew	34	10	8	16	46	41	+5	46	
17	Vancouver Whitecaps FC (Note: Canadian clubs cannot qualify for the 2023 CONCACAF Champions League through the MLS regular season or playoffs.) (V)	34	12	15	7	40	57	−17	43	Qualification for the 2023 CONCACAF Champions League (Note: As 2022 Canadian Championship winners (CAN1))
18	Colorado Rapids	34	11	13	10	46	57	−11	43	

Source: MLS
Rules for classification: 1) points; 2) total wins; 3) total goal differential; 4) total goals scored; 5) fewer disciplinary points; 6) away goal differential; 7) away goals scored; 8) home goals differential; 9) home goals scored; 10) coin toss (2 clubs tied) or drawing of lots (≥3 clubs tied)
(V) Canadian Championship winners

==== Results summary ====
Overall								Home						Away					
Pld	Pts	W	L	T	GF	GA	GD	W	L	T	GF	GA	GD	W	L	T	GF	GA	GD
34	46	10	8	16	46	41	+5	7	4	6	22	15	+7	3	4	10	24	26	−2

Source: MLS standings
Pld = Matches played; Pts = Points; W = Matches won; T = Matches tied; L = Matches lost; GF = Goals for; GA = Goals against; GD = Goal difference

==== Results by round ====
Round	1	2	3	4	5	6	7	8	9	10	11	12	13	14	15	16	17	18	19	20	21	22	23	24	25	26	27	28	29	30	31	32	33	34
Stadium	H	A	H	A	H	A	H	A	H	A	A	H	A	H	A	A	H	A	A	H	H	A	H	H	A	H	A	H	H	A	A	H	H	A
Result	W	D	W	D	L	L	L	D	W	D	L	L	W	D	D	W	D	W	D	W	D	D	L	W	D	D	D	W	D	D	L	D	W	L

Source: Columbus schedule
A = Away; H = Home; W = Win; D = Draw; L = Loss

==== Match results ====
On November 22, 2021 the league announced the home openers for every club, with Columbus playing Vancouver Whitecaps FC at Lower.com Field. The full 2022 season was released on December 15, 2021.

February 26 1	Columbus Crew	4–0	Vancouver Whitecaps FC	Columbus, OH
3:30 PM EST	Berry 8'; Etienne 25', (yellow card) 65'; Yeboah (yellow card) 40'; Morris (yellow card) 79'; Díaz 84'; Zelarayán 86'	Report	Caicedo (yellow card) 22'; Nerwinski (yellow card) 26' (yellow-red card) 53'	Stadium: Lower.com Field; Attendance: 18,939; Referee: Nima Saghafi; Assistant referees: Nick Uranga; Jeffrey Swartzel; Fourth official: Sergii Demianchuk

March 5 2	San Jose Earthquakes	3–3	Columbus Crew	San Jose, CA
5:30 PM EST	Espinoza 9' (pen.); Remedi (yellow card) 16'; Monteiro (red card) 33'; Judson (yellow card) 75'; Kikanovic (yellow card) 79'; Calvo 84' 90+6'	Report	Zelarayán 40' 73' (yellow card) 90'; Santos (yellow card) 45+6'; Zardes 68'; Igbekeme (yellow card) 83'; Anibaba (yellow card) 90+5'	Stadium: PayPal Park; Attendance: 12,888; Referee: Guido Gonzales Jr. Assistant referees: Jeremy Hanson; Diego Blas; Fourth official: Elijio Arreguin

March 12 3	Columbus Crew	2–1	Toronto FC	Columbus, OH
1:30 PM EDT	Mensah (yellow card) 29'; Zelarayán 56'; Etienne 65'; Díaz (yellow card) 82'; Artur (yellow card) 84'	Report	Jiménez 14'; Nelson (yellow card) 64'; Priso-Mbongue (yellow card) 79'	Stadium: Lower.com Field; Attendance: 16,116; Referee: Ismail Elfath; Assistant referees: Corey Parker; Kyle Atkins; Fourth official: Ismir Pekmic

March 19 4	New York Red Bulls	1–1	Columbus Crew	Harrison, NJ
2:00 PM EDT	Nealis (yellow card) 34'; Amaya (yellow card) 64'; Barlow 84'; Cásseres Jr. (yellow card) 86'	Report	Nagbe (yellow card) 43', (goal) 90+5'; Santos (yellow card) 80'	Stadium: Red Bull Arena; Attendance: Joe Dickerson; Referee: 15,323; Assistant referees: Adam Wienckowski; Justin Howard; Fourth official: Luis Arroyo

April 2 5	Columbus Crew	0–1	Nashville SC	Columbus, OH
6:00 PM EDT	Etienne (yellow card) 55'; Díaz (yellow card) 66'; Artur (yellow card) 90+3'	Report	Muyl 28', (yellow card) 79': Sapong (yellow card) 75'; Haakenson (yellow card) 90+5'	Stadium: Lower.com Field; Attendance: 20,371; Referee: Rubiel Vazquez; Assistant referees: Chris Elliott; Meghan Mullen; Fourth official: Marcos de Oliveira

April 9 6	Philadelphia Union	1–0	Columbus Crew	Chester, PA
6:00 PM EDT	Room 2' (o.g.); Sullivan (yellow card) 79'	Report	Moreira (yellow card) 66'	Stadium: Subaru Park; Attendance: 18,321; Referee: Armando Villarreal; Assistant referees: Corey Rockwell; Lyes Arfa; Fourth official: Alyssa Nichols

April 16 7	Columbus Crew	0–2	Orlando City SC	Columbus, OH
7:30 PM EDT	Moreira (yellow card) 45+1'; Artur (yellow card) 90+3'	Report	Schlegel 37', (yellow card) 77'; Kara 51'; Perea (yellow card) 71'; Smith (yellow card) 73'	Stadium: Lower.com Field; Attendance: 18,030; Referee: Drew Fischer; Assistant referees: Kathryn Nesbitt; Brooke Mayo; Fourth official: Chris Ruska

April 23 8	Sporting Kansas City	0–0	Columbus Crew	Kansas City, KS
8:30 PM EDT		Report	Santos (yellow card) 45+1'; Mensah (yellow card) 90+2'	Stadium: Children's Mercy Park; Attendance: 18,483; Referee: Rosendo Mendoza; Assistant referees: Chris Wattam; Kevin Klinger; Fourth official: Natalie Simon

April 30 9	Columbus Crew	3–0	D.C. United	Columbus, OH
7:30 PM EDT	Santos 28'; Etienne 43'; Nagbe 75'	Report	Hines-Ike (yellow card) 36'; Birnbaum (yellow card) 45+1'	Stadium: Lower.com Field; Attendance: 19,402; Referee: Timothy Ford; Assistant referees: Nick Uranga; Andrew Bigelow; Fourth official: Ismir Pekmic

May 7 10	New England Revolution	2–2	Columbus Crew	Foxborough, MA
7:30 PM EDT	Farrell (yellow card) 58'; Jones 70'; Buksa 82'	Report	Berry 27'; Morris (yellow card) 41'; Artur (yellow card) 60'; Hurtado 89'	Stadium: Gillette Stadium; Attendance: 26,421; Referee: Nima Saghafi; Assistant referees: Jason White; Meghan Mullen; Fourth official: Chris Ruska

May 14 11	New York City FC	2–0	Columbus Crew	New York, NY
7:00 PM EDT	Magno 9'; Moralez (yellow card) 18'; Castellanos 57'; Parks (yellow card) 84'; Martins (yellow card) 90'	Report	Mensah (yellow card) 86'	Stadium: Yankee Stadium; Attendance: 18,813; Referee: Marcos de Oliviera; Assistant referees: Jose Da Silva; Tyler Wyrostek; Fourth official: Luis Arroyo

May 21 12	Columbus Crew	0–2	Los Angeles FC	Columbus, OH
3:30 PM EDT		Report	Acosta (yellow card) 35'; Ibeagha (yellow card) 41'; Murillo (yellow card) 55'; Vela 62'; Cifuentes 73'; Palacios (yellow card) 75'; Sánchez (yellow card) 75'; Henry (yellow card) 90+5'	Stadium: Lower.com Field; Attendance: 19,649; Referee: Victor Rivas; Assistant referees: Andrew Bigelow; Jeffrey Swartzel; Fourth official: Luis Arroyo

May 28 13	Atlanta United FC	1–2	Columbus Crew	Atlanta, GA
7:00 PM EDT	Moreno (yellow card) 45+5'; Ibarra (yellow card) 45+10'; Franco (yellow card) 89'; Dwyer 90+1', (yellow card) 90+2'; Almada (red card) 90+7'	Report	Mensah 1'; Hurtado 45'; Sands (yellow card) 61'	Stadium: Mercedes-Benz Stadium; Attendance: 42,504; Referee: Joe Dickerson; Assistant referees: Ian Anderson; Cory Richardson; Fourth official: Alyssa Nichols

June 18 14	Columbus Crew	1–1	Charlotte FC	Columbus, OH
7:30 PM EDT	Hurtado 41', (yellow card) 59'	Report	Afful (yellow card) 15'; Shinyashiki 49'	Stadium: Lower.com Field; Attendance: 20,446; Referee: Silviu Petrescu; Assistant referees: Adam Wienckowski; Jason White; Fourth official: Ricardo Fierro

June 25 15	Real Salt Lake	0–0	Columbus Crew	Sandy, UT
10:00 PM EDT	Silva (yellow card) 45+3'	Report	Moreira (yellow card) 79'	Stadium: Rio Tinto Stadium; Attendance: 20,311; Referee: Mark Allatin; Assistant referees: Corey Parker; Kyle Atkins; Fourth official: Silviu Petrescu

June 29 16	Toronto FC	1–2	Columbus Crew	Toronto, ON
7:30 PM EDT	Thompson (yellow card) 37'; Jiménez 54'; Osorio (yellow card) 66'	Report	Zawadzki 18'; Nagbe 30'; Russell-Rowe (yellow card) 66'; Igbekeme (yellow card) 90+2'	Stadium: BMO Field; Attendance: 21,289; Referee: Armando Villarreal; Assistant referees: Gianni Facchini; Ian McKay; Fourth official: David Barrie

July 3 17	Columbus Crew	0–0	Philadelphia Union	Columbus, OH
7:30 PM EDT	Mensah (yellow card) 1'; Zelarayán (yellow card) 36'; Hurtado (yellow card) 39'; Santos (yellow card) 43'; Moreira (yellow card) 59'	Report	Elliot (yellow card) 39'; Bedoya (yellow card) 61'	Stadium: Lower.com Field; Attendance: 20,469; Referee: Nima Saghafi; Assistant referees: Nick Uranga; Kevin Lock; Fourth official: Eric Tattersall

July 9 18	Chicago Fire FC	2–3	Columbus Crew	Chicago, IL
8:00 PM EDT	Giménez (yellow card) 14'; Czichos 29', (yellow card) 43'; Mueller 41'; M. Navarro (yellow card) 50', (red card) 90'; Gutiérrez (yellow card) 54'; Durán (yellow card) 60'	Report	Moreira (yellow card) 8'; Etienne 63', 75'; Mensah (yellow card) 71'; Hernández 83', (yellow card) 84'	Stadium: Soldier Field; Attendance: 15,157; Referee: Ramy Touchan; Assistant referees: Chris Elliott; Ben Pilgrim; Fourth official: Alyssa Nichols

July 13 19	D.C. United	2–2	Columbus Crew	Washington, D.C.
8:00 PM EDT	Odoi-Atsem (yellow card) 22'; Skundrich (yellow card) 45+3'; Fountas 80'; Kamara 90+2'	Report	Hernández 62', 81'; Room (yellow card) 72'; Pedro Santos (yellow card) 75'	Stadium: Audi Field; Attendance: 10,128; Referee: Rosendo Mendoza; Assistant referees: Logan Brown; Gjovalin Bori; Fourth official: Adam Kilpatrick

July 17 20	Columbus Crew	2–0	FC Cincinnati	Columbus, OH
7:30 PM EDT	Hernández 16'; Moreira (yellow card) 78'; Zelarayán 86' (pen.)	Report	Hagglund (yellow card) 47'; Nwobodo (yellow card) 84'	Stadium: Lower.com Field; Attendance: 20,741; Referee: Marcos de Oliveira; Assistant referees: Andrew Bigelow; Jose Da Silva

July 23 21	Columbus Crew	0–0	New England Revolution	Columbus, OH
7:30 PM EDT		Report	McNamara (yellow card) 23'; Jones (yellow card) 35'; Bye (yellow card) 39'	Stadium: Lower.com Field; Attendance: 20,383; Referee: Silviu Petrescu; Assistant referees: Brian Dunn; Jeffrey Greeson; Fourth official: Tori Penso

July 30 22	Charlotte FC	Postponed	Columbus Crew	Charlotte, NC
7:00 PM EDT		Report		Stadium: Bank of America Stadium; Referee: Matthew Conger; Assistant referees: Frank Anderson; Chantal Boudreau; Fourth official: Alyssa Nichols
Note: Match play suspended in the 16th minute due to inclement weather. Match rescheduled for October 5.

August 3 23	Columbus Crew	1–2	CF Montréal	Columbus, OH
7:30 PM EDT	Zelarayán 14'; Díaz (yellow card) 47'	Report	Waterman (yellow card) 30', (goal) 90+4'; Kamara 88'	Stadium: Lower.com Field; Attendance: 19,010; Referee: Lukasz Szpala; Assistant referees: Jason White; Tiffini Turpin; Fourth official: Pierre-Luc Lauziere

August 6 24	Columbus Crew	3–2	New York City FC	Columbus, OH
7:30 PM EDT	Mensah (yellow card) 5'; Hernández 20'; Zelarayán 27', 75'; Etienne (yellow card) 63'	Report	Mensah 3' (o.g.); Rodríguez (yellow card) 18'; Morales (yellow card) 47'; Pereira 64'; Tinnerholm (yellow card) 74'; Amundsen (yellow card) 82'	Stadium: Lower.com Field; Attendance: 18,609; Referee: Rubiel Vazquez; Assistant referees: Kevin Klinger; Gjovalin Bori; Fourth official: Adam Kilpatrick

August 13 25	Colorado Rapids	1–1	Columbus Crew	Commerce City, CO
9:00 PM EDT	Esteves (yellow card) 28'; Wilson (yellow card) 38'; Rubio 41' (pen.), (yellow card) 78'; Acosta (yellow card) 42'	Report	Hernández 5'; Nagbe (yellow card) 35'; Artur (yellow card) 40'; Zelarayán (yellow card) 63'	Stadium: Dick's Sporting Goods Park; Attendance: 13,254; Referee: Jon Freemon; Assistant referees: Jeff Hosking; C.J. Morgante; Fourth official: Brandon Stevis

August 21 26	Columbus Crew	2–2	Atlanta United FC	Columbus, OH
6:00 PM EDT	Artur (yellow card) 31'; Etienne (yellow card) 51'; Hernández 66', 72'; Mensah (yellow card) 82'	Report	Sosa 21', (yellow card) 69'; Purata 77'; Mosquera (yellow card) 79'	Stadium: Lower.com Field; Attendance: 17,461; Referee: Joe Dickerson; Assistant referees: Lyes Arfa; Gianni Facchini; Fourth official: Guido Gonzalez Jr.

August 27 27	FC Cincinnati	2–2	Columbus Crew	Cincinnati, OH
9:00 PM EDT	Vazquez 36'; Moreno (yellow card) 40'; Miazga 77'	Report	Degenk (yellow card) 47'; Etienne 74'; Moreira 90+6'	Stadium: TQL Stadium; Attendance: 25,037; Referee: Kevin Stott; Assistant referees: Kathryn Nesbitt; Chris Elliott; Fourth official: Silviu Petrescu

August 31 28	Columbus Crew	1–0	Inter Miami CF	Columbus, OH
7:30 PM EDT	Nagbe (yellow card) 29'; Díaz 64'; Anibaba (yellow card) 90+3'	Report	McVey (yellow card) 52'; Gregore (yellow card) 73'	Stadium: Lower.com Field; Attendance: 18,034; Referee: Armando Villarreal; Assistant referees: Andrew Bigelow; Diego Blas; Fourth official: Matthew Thompson

September 3 29	Columbus Crew	0–0	Chicago Fire FC	Columbus, OH
7:30 PM EDT	Díaz (yellow card) 74'	Report	Herbers (yellow card) 85'; Espinoza (yellow card) 90+7'	Stadium: Lower.com Field; Attendance: 18,189; Referee: Ismir Pekmic; Assistant referees: Chantal Boudreau; Walter Heatherly; Fourth official: Sergii Demianchuk

September 9 30	CF Montréal	2–2	Columbus Crew	Montreal, QB
7:30 PM EDT	Wanyama 89'; Brault-Guillard 90+4'	Report	Mensah 66'; Zelarayán 68'; Díaz (red card) 76'	Stadium: Saputo Stadium; Attendance: 19,619; Referee: Lukasz Szpala; Assistant referees: Adam Wienckowski; Oscar Mitchell-Carvalho; Fourth official: Silviu Petrescu

September 13 31	Inter Miami CF	2–1	Columbus Crew	Fort Lauderdale, FL
7:30 PM EDT	Higuaín 25', 82'; Taylor (yellow card) 38'	Report	Hernández 41'; Williams (yellow card) 52'	Stadium: DRV PNK Stadium; Attendance: 9,778; Referee: Jon Freemon; Assistant referees: Jeff Hosking; Kevin Klinger; Fourth official: Tori Penso

September 18 32	Columbus Crew	1–1	Portland Timbers	Columbus, OH
7:30 PM EDT	Morris (yellow card) 10'; Molino 36'; Hernández (yellow card) 90+3'	Report	Chara (yellow card) 25'; Tuiloma (yellow card) 45'; Mabiala (yellow card) 66'; Moreno (yellow card) 71', (goal) 90+5'	Stadium: Lower.com Field; Attendance: 20,421; Referee: Victor Rivas; Assistant referees: Brian Poeschel; C.J. Morgante; Fourth official: Fotis Bazakos

October 1 33	Columbus Crew	2–1	New York Red Bulls	Columbus, OH
7:30 PM EDT	Artur (yellow card) 26'; Williams (yellow card) 66'; Etienne 89', 90+3'	Report	Edelman (yellow card) 19'; Amaya 53'; Nealis (yellow card) 58'	Stadium: Lower.com Field; Attendance: 20,757; Referee: Marcos de Oliveira; Assistant referees: Cory Richardson; Corey Parker; Fourth official: Chris Ruska

October 5 22	Charlotte FC	2–2	Columbus Crew	Charlotte, NC
7:00 PM EDT	Mora (yellow card) 50'; Ríos 58'; Shinyashiki 90+4'	Report	Zelarayán 36'; Díaz 54', (yellow card) 87'; Hernández (yellow card) 88'; Room (yellow card) 90+3'; Etienne (yellow card) 90+5'	Stadium: Bank of America Stadium; Attendance: 34,122; Referee: Matthew Conger; Assistant referees: Frank Anderson; Chantal Boudreau; Fourth official: Alyssa Nichols
Note: Match play suspended in the 16th minute due to inclement weather on July 30. To be resumed at this date and time.

October 9 34	Orlando City SC	2–1	Columbus Crew	Orlando, FL
2:30 PM EDT	Urso 56', (yellow card) 87'; Araújo (yellow card) 58'; Smith (yellow card) 78'; Torres 84' (pen.); Angulo (yellow card) 90'; Michel (yellow card) 90'; Cartagena (yellow card) 90+5'	Report	Santos (yellow card) 9'; Etienne 38'; Nagbe (yellow card) 73'; Degenek (yellow card) 82'	Stadium: Exploria Stadium; Attendance: 21,693; Referee: Alex Chilowicz; Assistant referees: Frank Anderson; Corey Rockwell; Fourth official: Eric Tattersall

=== MLS Cup Playoffs ===
The Columbus Crew failed to qualify for the playoffs in this season.

=== U.S. Open Cup ===
On July 20, 2021 US Soccer announced that the tournament would be cancelled for 2021 and would resume in 2022. The Crew was one of 17 MLS teams entering in the Third round of the tournament.

April 19 Third Round	Detroit City FC (USLC) (Michigan)	2–1	(Ohio) Columbus Crew (MLS)	Hamtramck, MI
7:00 PM EDT	Lewis (yellow card) 62'; Rodriguez 64', 86' (pen.)	Report	Zardes 7'; Sands (yellow card) 43'; Parente (yellow card) 66'; Berry (yellow card) 87'	Stadium: Keyworth Stadium; Attendance: 6,121; Referee: Chris Ruska; Assistant referees: Jake Brochu; Ryan Homik; Fourth official: Nicole Green

== Statistics ==
=== Appearances and goals ===
Under "Apps" for each section, the first number represents the number of starts, and the second number represents appearances as a substitute.

No.	Pos	Nat	Player	Total		MLS		U.S. Open Cup	
No.	Pos	Nat	Player	Apps	Goals	Apps	Goals	Apps	Goals
1	GK	(Curaçao) CUW	Eloy Room	34	0	34+0	0	0+0	0
2	MF	(United States) USA	Perry Kitchen	0	0	0+0	0	0+0	0
3	DF	(United States) USA	Josh Williams	24	0	15+8	0	1+0	0
4	DF	(Ghana) GHA	Jonathan Mensah	30	2	30+0	2	0+0	0
5	DF	(Australia) AUS	Miloš Degenek	28	0	24+4	0	0+0	0
6	MF	(United States) USA	Darlington Nagbe	34	3	34+0	3	0+0	0
7	MF	(Portugal) POR	Pedro Santos	29	1	28+1	1	0+0	0
8	MF	(Brazil) BRA	Artur	24	0	20+4	0	0+0	0
9	FW	(Colombia) COL	Cucho Hernández	16	9	14+2	9	0+0	0
10	MF	(Armenia) ARM	Lucas Zelarayán	29	10	25+4	10	0+0	0
12	MF	(Costa Rica) CRC	Luis Díaz	26	3	17+9	3	0+0	0
13	FW	(Trinidad and Tobago) TTO	Kevin Molino	11	1	4+7	1	0+0	0
14	MF	(Ghana) GHA	Yaw Yeboah	20	0	10+9	0	0+1	0
16	MF	(United States) USA	Isaiah Parente	1	0	0+0	0	1+0	0
17	DF	(United States) USA	Marlon Hairston	4	0	1+2	0	1+0	0
19	FW	(United States) USA	Erik Hurtado	15	3	4+10	3	1+0	0
20	MF	(Romania) ROU	Alexandru Mățan	7	0	0+6	0	1+0	0
21	MF	(United States) USA	Aidan Morris	28	0	20+7	0	1+0	0
22	MF	(Haiti) HAI	Derrick Etienne Jr.	34	9	25+8	9	0+1	0
23	DF	(United States) USA	Jalil Anibaba	6	0	3+2	0	1+0	0
24	GK	(United States) USA	Evan Bush	1	0	0+0	0	1+0	0
25	MF	(United States) USA	Sean Zawadzki	5	1	4+1	1	0+0	0
26	MF	(Nigeria) NGR	James Igbekeme	24	0	8+15	0	1+0	0
28	GK	(United States) USA	Patrick Schulte	0	0	0+0	0	0+0	0
30	MF	(United States) USA	Will Sands	13	0	5+7	0	1+0	0
31	DF	(Cape Verde) CPV	Steven Moreira	32	1	32+0	1	0+0	0
32	GK	(United States) USA	Brady Scott	0	0	0+0	0	0+0	0
33	DF	(United States) USA	Jake Morris	1	0	0+0	0	0+1	0
39	FW	(Canada) CAN	Jacen Russell-Rowe	6	0	3+3	0	0+0	0
41	DF	(Algeria) ALG	Mohamed Farsi	7	0	0+7	0	0+0	0
			Own goal	0	0	-	0	-	0
Players who left Columbus during the season:
11	FW	(United States) USA	Gyasi Zardes	8	2	1+6	1	1+0	1
27	FW	(Spain) ESP	Miguel Berry	17	2	13+3	2	0+1	0
36	MF	(Puerto Rico) PUR	Isaac Angking	0	0	0+0	0	0+0	0
37	DF	(United States) USA	Philip Quinton	0	0	0+0	0	0+0	0
38	FW	(United States) USA	Noah Fuson	0	0	0+0	0	0+0	0

=== Disciplinary record ===
No.	Pos.	Name	MLS		U.S. Open Cup		Total	
No.	Pos.	Name	Booked	Sent off (straight red)	Booked	Sent off (straight red)	Booked	Sent off (straight red)
1	GK	(Curaçao) Eloy Room	1	0	0	0	1	0
2	MF	(United States) Perry Kitchen	0	0	0	0	0	0
3	DF	(United States) Josh Williams	2	0	0	0	2	0
4	DF	(Ghana) Jonathan Mensah	7	0	0	0	7	0
5	DF	(Australia) Miloš Degenek	3	0	0	0	3	0
6	MF	(United States) Darlington Nagbe	4	0	0	0	4	0
7	MF	(Portugal) Pedro Santos	6	0	0	0	6	0
8	MF	(Brazil) Artur	7	0	0	0	7	0
9	FW	(Colombia) Cucho Hernández	3	0	0	0	3	0
10	MF	(Armenia) Lucas Zelarayán	3	0	0	0	3	0
12	MF	(Costa Rica) Luis Díaz	6	1	0	0	6	1
13	FW	(Trinidad and Tobago) Kevin Molino	0	0	0	0	0	0
14	MF	(Ghana) Yaw Yeboah	1	0	0	0	1	0
16	MF	(United States) Isaiah Parente	0	0	1	0	1	0
17	DF	(United States) Marlon Hairston	0	0	0	0	0	0
18	MF	(United States) Sebastian Berhalter	0	0	0	0	0	0
19	FW	(United States) Erik Hurtado	2	0	0	0	2	0
20	MF	(Ghana) Alexandru Mățan	0	0	0	0	0	0
21	MF	(United States) Aidan Morris	3	0	0	0	3	0
22	MF	(Haiti) Derrick Etienne Jr.	5	0	0	0	5	0
23	DF	(United States) Jalil Anibaba	2	0	0	0	2	0
24	GK	(United States) Evan Bush	0	0	0	0	0	0
25	MF	(United States) Sean Zawadzki	0	0	0	0	0	0
26	MF	(Nigeria) James Igbekeme	2	0	0	0	2	0
28	GK	(United States) Patrick Schulte	0	0	0	0	0	0
30	MF	(United States) Will Sands	1	0	1	0	2	0
31	DF	(Cape Verde) Steven Moreira	6	0	0	0	6	0
32	GK	(United States) Brady Scott	0	0	0	0	0	0
33	DF	(United States) Jake Morris	0	0	0	0	0	0
39	FW	(United States) Jacen Russell-Rowe	1	0	0	0	1	0
41	DF	(United States) Mohamed Farsi	0	0	0	0	0	0
Players who left Columbus during the season:
11	FW	(United States) Gyasi Zardes	0	0	0	0	0	0
27	FW	(Spain) Miguel Berry	0	0	1	0	1	0
36	MF	(Puerto Rico) Isaac Angking	0	0	0	0	0	0
37	DF	(United States) Philip Quinton	0	0	0	0	0	0
38	FW	(United States) Noah Fuson	0	0	0	0	0	0

=== Clean sheets ===
No.	Name	MLS	U.S. Open Cup	Total	Games Played
1	(Curaçao) Eloy Room	9	0	9	34
24	(United States) Evan Bush	0	0	0	1
28	(United States) Patrick Schulte	0	0	0	0
32	(United States) Brady Scott	0	0	0	0

== Transfers ==
=== In ===
Pos.	Player	Transferred from	Fee/notes	Date	Source
MF	(Ghana) Yaw Yeboah	(Poland) Wisla Krakow	Utilizing Targeted Allocation Money, contract will run through the 2024 season with an option for 2025.	January 6, 2022	
GK	(United States) Evan Bush	(United States) Columbus Crew	Contract will run through the 2022 season with an option for 2023.	January 6, 2022	
GK	(United States) Patrick Schulte	(United States) Columbus Crew	Selected in round 1 of the 2022 MLS SuperDraft as a Generation Adidas signing.	January 11, 2022	
MF	(United States) Sean Zawadzki	(United States) Georgetown University	Contract as a Homegrown Player through the 2023 season with options through 2025.	January 13, 2022	
GK	(United States) Brady Scott	(United States) Austin FC	Contract for 2022 with options for 2023 and 2024. Selected in Stage 2 of the 2021 MLS Re-Entry Draft.	January 13, 2022	
DF	(United States) Jalil Anibaba	(United States) Nashville SC	Signed via free Agency for the 2022 season with an option for 2023	January 14, 2022	
DF	(United States) Jake Morris	(United States) Campbell University	Signed as a Homegrown Player through the 2023 season with options in 2024 and 2025. The Crew traded $50,000 in General Allocation Money (GAM) for 2022 to Seattle Sounders FC in exchange for Morris’ MLS Homegrown Priority.	January 14, 2022	
DF	(United States) Will Sands	(United States) Georgetown University	Signed as a Homegrown Player through the 2023 season with options in 2024 and 2025. The Crew traded $50,000 in General Allocation Money (GAM) for 2022 to New York City FC in exchange for Sands’ MLS Homegrown Priority.	January 21, 2022	
DF	(Australia) Milos Degenek	(Serbia) Red Star Belgrade	Signed through the 2023 season with options for 2024 and 2025.	January 24, 2022	
FW	(United States) Erik Hurtado	(United States) Columbus Crew	Contract will run through the 2022 season with an option for 2023.	February 3, 2022	
FW	(Canada) Jacen Russell-Rowe	(United States) Columbus Crew 2	Signed as a Homegrown Player through the 2024 season with options in 2025 and 2026. The Crew traded $50,000 in General Allocation Money (GAM) for 2022 to Toronto FC in exchange for Russell-Rowe's MLS Homegrown Priority.	June 29, 2022	
FW	(Colombia) Cucho Hernández	(England) Watford F.C.	Signed as a Young Designated Player through 2025 via a $10 million transfer fee.	July 7, 2022	
FW	(Algeria) Mohamed Farsi	(United States) Columbus Crew 2	Signed through the 2023 season with options in 2024 and 2025.	July 22, 2022	
DF	(Colombia) Jimmy Medranda	(United States) Seattle Sounders FC	Free agent, contract runs through 2023 with an option for 2024	December 23, 2022	

=== Loan in ===
Pos.	Player	Parent club	Length/Notes	Beginning	End	Source
MF	(Nigeria) James Igbekeme	(Spain) Real Zaragoza	Loaned through the 2022 MLS season with an option to exercise a permanent transfer.	January 26, 2022	December 31, 2022	
DF	(United States) Philip Quinton	(United States) Columbus Crew 2	Short term agreement	April 19, 2022	April 19, 2022	
MF	(Puerto Rico) Isaac Angking	(United States) Columbus Crew 2	Short term agreement	April 19, 2022	April 19, 2022	
FW	(United States) Noah Fuson	(United States) Columbus Crew 2	Short term agreement	April 23, 2022	April 23, 2022	
DF	(Algeria) Mohamed Farsi	(United States) Columbus Crew 2	Short term agreements	June 18, 2022	June 18, 2022	
DF	(Algeria) Mohamed Farsi	(United States) Columbus Crew 2	Short term agreements	June 25, 2016	June 25, 2016	
FW	(Canada) Jacen Russell-Rowe	(United States) Columbus Crew 2	Short term agreements	May 28, 2022	May 28, 2022	
FW	(Canada) Jacen Russell-Rowe	(United States) Columbus Crew 2	Short term agreements	June 18, 2016	June 18, 2016	
FW	(Canada) Jacen Russell-Rowe	(United States) Columbus Crew 2	Short term agreements	June 25, 2016	June 25, 2016	

=== Out ===
Pos.	Player	Transferred to	Fee/notes	Date	Source
DF	(United States) Aboubacar Keita	(United States) Colorado Rapids	$300,000 in General Allocation Money and up to $150,000 in conditional GAM.	January 5, 2022	
DF	(United States) Sebastian Berhalter	(Canada) Vancouver Whitecaps FC	$50,000 in GAM for 2022 and up to $50,000 in conditional GAM if certain performance incentives are met.	February 4, 2022	
FW	(United States) Gyasi Zardes	(United States) Colorado Rapids	$1.4 million in 2022 GAM received, allocated as a guaranteed $300,000 and up to an additional $1.1M if multiple performance metrics are met while with the Rapids.	April 22, 2022	
FW	(Spain) Miguel Berry	(United States) D.C. United	Guaranteed $125,000 in GAM from D.C. United in 2022, $100,000 in GAM in 2023, and up to an additional $100,000 in GAM if certain performance incentives are met.	July 20, 2022	
DF	(United States) Jalil Anibaba	Retired	Option declined	October 26, 2022	
FW	(United States) Erik Hurtado	(United States) San Antonio FC	Option declined	October 26, 2022	
DF	(Portugal) Pedro Santos	(United States) D.C. United	Option declined	October 26, 2022	
MF	(Haiti) Derrick Etienne Jr.	(United States) Atlanta United FC	Contract expired	October 26, 2022	
DF	(United States) Marlon Hairston	(United States) Hartford Athletic	Contract expired	October 26, 2022	
DF	(United States) Perry Kitchen	Retired		October 26, 2022	
MF	(Brazil) Artur	(United States) Houston Dynamo FC	Traded for $300,000 in General Allocation Money, and potentially an additional $50,000 if certain performance metrics are met	November 22, 2022	

=== Loans out ===
Pos.	Player	Loanee club	Length/Notes	Beginning	End	Source
GK	(United States) Brady Scott	(United States) Columbus Crew 2	First team loan to affiliate	March 26, 2022	October 8, 2022	
MF	(United States) Sean Zawadzki	(United States) Columbus Crew 2	First team loan to affiliate	April 3, 2022	October 8, 2022	
GK	(United States) Patrick Schulte	(United States) Columbus Crew 2	First team loan to affiliate	April 3, 2022	October 8, 2022	
DF	(United States) Jake Morris	(United States) Columbus Crew 2	First team loan to affiliate	April 3, 2022	October 8, 2022	
DF	(United States) Will Sands	(United States) Columbus Crew 2	First team loan to affiliate	April 10, 2022	August 7, 2022	
DF	(United States) Josh Williams	(United States) Columbus Crew 2	First team loan to affiliate	April 10, 2022	April 10, 2022	
MF	(Romania) Alexandru Mățan	(United States) Columbus Crew 2	First team loan to affiliate	April 10, 2022	July 10, 2022	
MF	(United States) Aidan Morris	(United States) Columbus Crew 2	First team loan to affiliate	April 10, 2022	May 21, 2022	
FW	(United States) Erik Hurtado	(United States) Columbus Crew 2	First team loan to affiliate	April 15, 2022	April 15, 2022	
MF	(United States) Isaiah Parente	(United States) Columbus Crew 2	First team loan to affiliate	April 15, 2022	October 8, 2022	
FW	(Canada) Jacen Russell-Rowe	(United States) Columbus Crew 2	First team loan to affiliate	July 16, 2022	October 8, 2022	
DF	(Algeria) Mohamed Farsi	(United States) Columbus Crew 2	First team loan to affiliate	July 31, 2022	October 2, 2022	
MF	(Romania) Alexandru Mățan	(Romania) Rapid București	Loaned through the remainder of the 2022 MLS season with an option to exercise a permanent transfer.	August 9, 2022	December 31, 2022	

=== MLS Draft picks ===
Draft picks are not automatically signed to the team roster. Only those who are signed to a contract will be listed as transfers in. The picks for Columbus Crew are listed below:

2022 Columbus Crew SuperDraft Picks
Round	Pick	Player	Position	College
1	12	(United States) Patrick Schulte	GK	Saint Louis
1	25	(United States) Philip Quinton	DF	Notre Dame
2	40	(United States) Jacob Erlandson	DF	Bowling Green
3	68	(United States) Chris Donovan	DF	Drexel

== Awards ==
MLS Team of the Week
Week	Starters	Bench	Opponent(s)	Link
1	(Armenia) Lucas Zelarayán		(Canada) Vancouver Whitecaps FC	
2	(Armenia) Lucas Zelarayán		(United States) San Jose Earthquakes	
3	(Armenia) Lucas Zelarayán	(Haiti) Derrick Etienne Jr.	(Canada) Toronto FC	
4	(United States) Darlington Nagbe		(United States) New York Red Bulls	
9	(Portugal) Pedro Santos	(United States) Darlington Nagbe	(United States) D.C. United	
10		(Haiti) Derrick Etienne Jr.	(United States) New England Revolution	
14	(Curaçao) Eloy Room	(Ghana) Jonathan Mensah	(United States) Atlanta United FC	
15		(United States) Aidan Morris	(United States) Charlotte FC	
17	(Curaçao) Eloy Room	(Canada) Jacen Russell-Rowe	(United States) Real Salt Lake (Canada) Toronto FC	
19	(Haiti) Derrick Etienne Jr. (Colombia) Cucho Hernández		(United States) Chicago Fire FC	
20	(Colombia) Cucho Hernández		(United States) D.C. United	
21	(Armenia) Lucas Zelarayán	(Colombia) Cucho Hernández	(United States) FC Cincinnati	
24	(Armenia) Lucas Zelarayán		(Canada) CF Montréal (United States) New York City FC	
26	(Colombia) Cucho Hernández		(United States) Atlanta United FC	
27	(Cape Verde) Steven Moreira		(United States) FC Cincinnati	
28	(Australia) Miloš Degenek	(Cape Verde) Steven Moreira	(United States) Inter Miami CF (United States) Chicago Fire FC	
33	(Haiti) Derrick Etienne Jr.		(United States) New York Red Bulls	

=== MLS Player of the Month ===
Month	Player	Stats	Link
February/March	(Armenia) Lucas Zelarayán	4 goals, 1 assist	

=== 2022 MLS All-Star Game ===
Starters

- MF Darlington Nagbe

=== 2022 MLS Next All-Star Game ===
- GK Stanislav Lapkes
- MF Gio De Libera

=== Postseason ===
MLS Next Pro Executive of the Year

- Corey Wray

=== Crew Team Awards ===
- Most Valuable Player – Darlington Nagbe
- Golden Boot Winner – Lucas Zelarayán
- Defender of the Year – Eloy Room
- Kirk Urso Heart Award – Aidan Morris
- Humanitarian of the Year – Josh Williams
- Columbus Crew 2 Player of the Year – Jacen Russell-Rowe
- Academy Player of the Year – Gio De Libera

== Kits ==
Home	Away

Type	Shirt	Shorts	Socks
Home	Gold	Gold	Gold
Away	Gray	White	White
