= Luis Díaz (Costa Rican footballer) =

Costa Rican football player (born 1998)

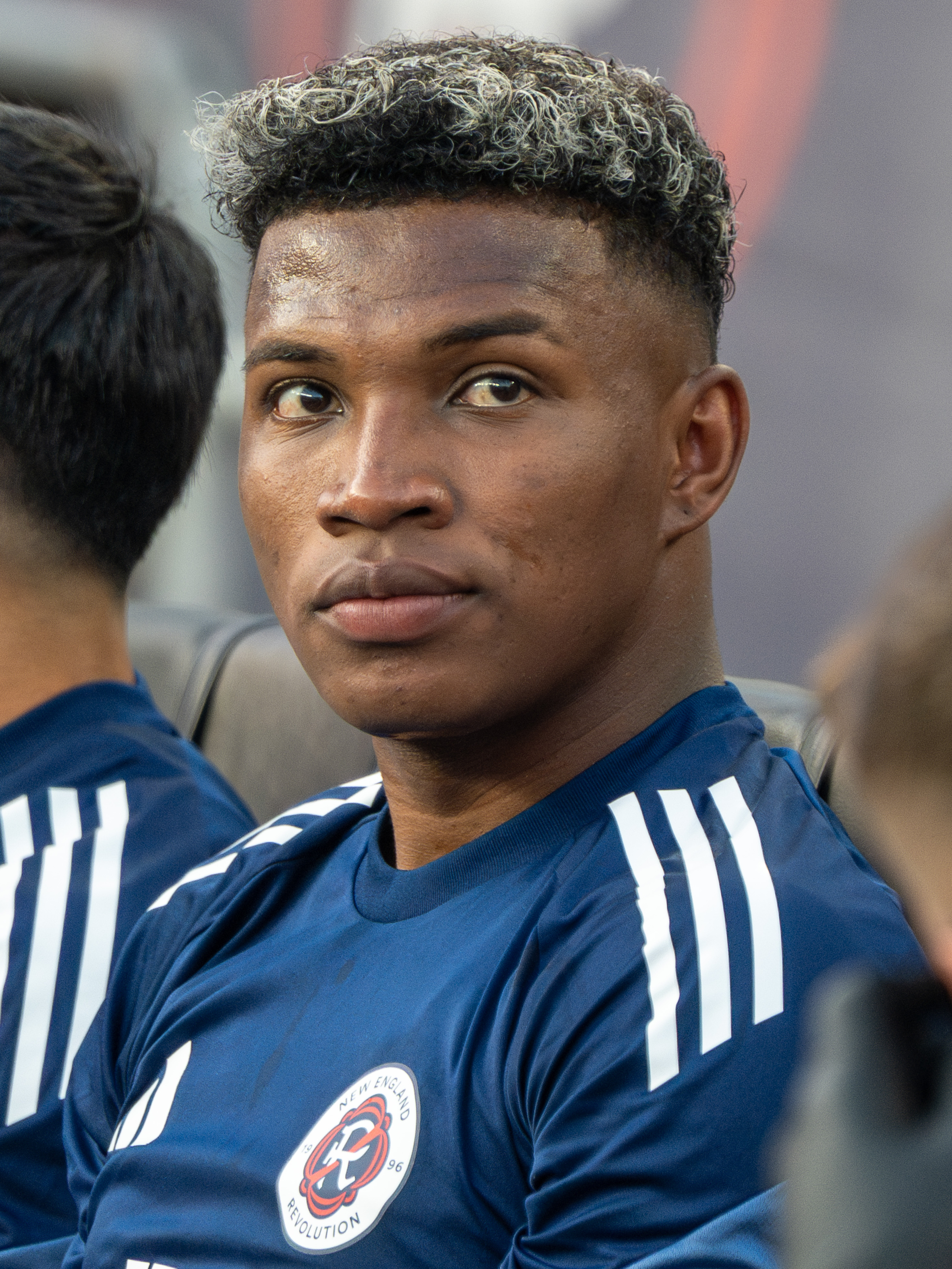
- Diaz with the New England Revolution in 2025

Personal information
- Full name: Luis Mario Díaz Espinoza
- Date of birth: 6 December 1998 (age 27)
- Place of birth: Nicoya, Costa Rica
- Height: 1.80 m (5 ft 11 in)
- Position: Winger

Youth career
- 2005–2016: A.D. Guanacasteca
- 2016: Grecia

Senior career*
Years	Team	Apps	(Gls)
2016–2018	Grecia	45	(2)
2019	Herediano	19	(1)
2019–2023	Columbus Crew	88	(6)
2023	Columbus Crew 2	2	(0)
2023	Colorado Rapids	3	(0)
2024–2025	Deportivo Saprissa	31	(1)
2025	New England Revolution	19	(0)

International career^{‡}
2017–2018	Costa Rica U20		
2021	Costa Rica U23	3	(0)
2019–2021	Costa Rica	8	(0)
- * Club domestic league appearances and goals as of 15:36, 14 August 2025 (UTC) ‡ National team caps and goals as of 00:39, 29 November 2022 (UTC)

Luis Mario Díaz Espinoza (born 6 December 1998) is a Costa Rican professional footballer who plays as a winger.

== Club career ==
=== Costa Rica ===
Díaz started his career in the academy of his local team, A.D. Guanacasteca at the age of five, remaining with the academy until he was 17. In 2016, he attended a tournament with Guanacasteca in which he was noticed by Municipal Grecia, where he was subsequently signed. In the 2016–17 season, he and Grecia earned promotion to Liga FPD, the first division of Costa Rican football. Over the summer of 2018, Díaz was the subject of transfer rumors from Herediano; he would officially join Herediano for the 2019 Clausura. On July 2, 2019, it was announced that Díaz had been transferred to Major League Soccer club Columbus Crew for $1 million.

=== Columbus Crew ===
Díaz made his Columbus debut on 17 July against the Chicago Fire, coming on in the 65th minute. Díaz assisted fellow debutant Romario Williams in scoring a 90th-minute equalizer as part of a 2–2 draw. He was named to the team of the week for his efforts in a 3–1 victory against Atlanta United. He went on to finish the 2019 season making 13 appearances along with two goals and four assists.

During the 2020 season, Diaz was part of the Columbus team that won the 2020 MLS Cup, making a total of 25 appearances for the club. Though Díaz was in and out of the starting lineup throughout the season, he started three out of four of the club's playoff games, including the final in which Columbus beat Seattle Sounders FC 3–0.

During the 2021 season, Díaz had a promising start, featuring in all of the first eleven games, starting ten, including in the CONCACAF Champions League. He scored his first goal in the new season against Toronto FC on 29 May, his first for the club since September 2019. However, an injury on national team duty led to his withdrawal from the squad, and caused him to miss three straight games for Columbus. After returning in time for the unveiling of Columbus' new stadium, Díaz participated in the Gold Cup with Costa Rica, resulting in his absence from the following four league games. Upon his return from the national team, he struggled to secure a regular starting position, making a total of twelve appearances to wrap up the season, with only four starts. He made a substitute appearance in the 64th minute to help his team secure a 2–0 victory against Cruz Azul in the 2021 Campeones Cup. His team would fail to make the end of season playoffs after winning the championship the previous year.

The beginning of 2022 saw Diaz relegated to the bench to start out the season, however, in the first game of the new season, he would come on as a substitute to score the third goal in a 4–0 drubbing to Vancouver Whitecaps FC. Despite initially being a substitute with occasional starts, lackluster play from his teammates, combined with his impressive two-assist game against the Chicago Fire, earned him a starting position for the rest of the year. He would go on to score the only goal in a 1–0 victory against Inter Miami CF. At the end of the year, the Crew would fail to make the playoffs for a second consecutive season.

After playing in just four games for the Crew in 2023, Díaz was waived on 5 September 2023. Three days later, he was claimed by the Colorado Rapids and played in three total games.

=== Saprissa ===
Following the conclusion of the 2023 Major League Soccer season, Diaz would return to Costa Rica, signing for Saprissa. He twice received a direct red-card, the first occasion in a match versus Municipal Liberia for violent conduct leading to a three-game suspension, and the second due to "committing a challenge using excessive force against an opponent," which lead to a two-game suspension. He scored his first goal for Los Morados in a 3–1 win versus Guanacasteca.

=== New England Revolution ===
On 2 January 2025, Diaz returned to Major League Soccer, signing a contract with the New England Revolution as a free agent. He made his Revolution debut on 22 February, starting in the 2025 season opener against Nashville SC. Díaz was waived by New England on 14 August 2025.

== International career ==
He made his Costa Rica national team debut on 6 September 2019 in a friendly against Uruguay, when he replaced Joel Campbell in the 68th minute and was cautioned in the remaining minutes.

== Personal life ==
Díaz used part of his salary in Major League Soccer to buy his family a new house in Costa Rica.

== Career statistics ==
=== Club ===
As of 23 May 2025

Club	Season	League			Playoff (Note: Appearances in the Liga FPD Playoffs and the Major League Soccer Playoffs)		Cup		Continental (Note: All appearances in the CONCACAF Champions League)		Other		Total	
Club	Season	Division	Apps	Goals	Apps	Goal	Apps	Goals	Apps	Goals	Apps	Goals	Apps	Goals
Grecia	2016–17	Segunda División			2 (Note: Appearances in the Segunda División promotion playoffs)	0	–		–		–		2	0
Grecia	2017–18	Liga FPD	27	2	–		–		–		–		27	2
Grecia	2018–19	Liga FPD	18	0	–		–		–		–		18	0
Grecia	Total		45	2	2	0	–		–		–		47	2
Herediano	2018–19	Liga FPD	19	1	2	0	–		2	0	–		23	1
Columbus Crew	2019	MLS	13	2	–		–		–		–		13	2
Columbus Crew	2020	MLS	26	0	4	0	–		–		1 (Note: Appearance in the MLS is Back Tournament)	0	31	0
Columbus Crew	2021	MLS	19	1	–		–		4	0	1 (Note: Appearance in the Campeones Cup)	0	24	1
Columbus Crew	2022	MLS	26	3	–		–		–		–		26	3
Columbus Crew	2023	MLS	4	0	–		0	0	–		–		4	0
Columbus Crew	Total		88	6	4	0	0	0	4	0	2	0	98	6
Columbus Crew 2 (loan)	2023	MLS Next Pro	2	0	0	0	0	0	0	0	–		2	0
Colorado Rapids	2023	MLS	3	0	–		0	0	0	0	–		3	0
Saprissa	2023–24	Liga FPD	16	0	3	0	0	0	2	0	–		21	0
Saprissa	2024–25	Liga FPD	15	1	2	0	1	0	8 (Note: Appearances in the Central American Cup)	2	2 (Note: Includes one appearance in the Supercup, and one appearance in the Recopa Costa Rica)	1	28	4
Saprissa	Total		31	1	5	0	1	0	10	2	2	1	49	4
New England Revolution	2025	MLS	8	0	0	0	1	0	–		0	0	9	0
Career total			196	10	13	0	2	0	16	2	4	1	231	13

=== International ===
As of 15 May 2022

Costa Rica
Year	Apps	Goals
2019	2	0
2020	2	0
2021	4	0
Total	8	0

== Honours ==
Columbus Crew

- MLS Cup: 2020
- Campeones Cup: 2021

Saprissa

- 2024 Clausura
