= Isaiah Parente =

American soccer player (born 2000)

Personal information
- Full name: Isaiah Giuseppe Parente
- Date of birth: March 16, 2000 (age 26)
- Place of birth: Medina, Ohio, United States
- Height: 1.75 m (5 ft 9 in)
- Position: Midfielder

Team information
- Current team: LA Galaxy
- Number: 16

Youth career
- Team Challenger FC
- 2015–2018: Columbus Crew

College career
Years	Team	Apps	(Gls)
2018–2020	Wake Forest Demon Deacons	50	(3)

Senior career*
Years	Team	Apps	(Gls)
2019	Flint City Bucks	5	(1)
2021–2023	Columbus Crew	13	(0)
2022–2023	→ Columbus Crew 2	21	(9)
2024	Ventura County FC	21	(3)
2024–	LA Galaxy	31	(0)
- * Club domestic league appearances and goals as of 12:17, 7 December 2025 (UTC)

Isaiah Giuseppe Parente (born March 16, 2000) is an American professional soccer player who plays as a midfielder for Major League Soccer club LA Galaxy.

== Early career ==
A youth product of Team Challenger FC, Parente played on the same team as future Columbus Crew teammate Sean Zawadzki. Parente was also part of the Columbus Crew Academy between 2015 and 2018, making a total of 68 appearances and scoring 15 goals.

In 2018, Parente went to play college soccer at Wake Forest University. During his time with the Demon Deacons, he was noted as "a consistent catalyst for Wake Forest's attack," and would go on to make 50 appearances, scoring 3 goals and tallying 19 assists.

During 2019, Parente also appeared for USL League Two side Flint City Bucks, who went on to win the league championship.

== Professional career ==
=== Columbus Crew ===
Parente was announced as a homegrown player signing by Columbus Crew on January 11, 2021, and made his professional debut on April 8, appearing as a 77th-minute substitute during a 4–0 win against Real Estelí in the round of 16 of the CONCACAF Champions League. He scored his first two goals for Columbus on May 10, 2023 in a U.S Open Cup game against Loudoun United. Parente featured sparingly for the first team, making 20 appearances across all competitions over three seasons. Most of his playing time came with the reserve side, where he won the MLS Next Pro Cup in 2022, and was named to the MLS Next Pro Best XI. At the conclusion of the 2023 MLS season, Parente was released.

=== LA Galaxy ===
During the beginning of the 2024 season, Parente signed with LA Galaxy reserve side Ventura County FC, and made 16 appearances before signing a first-team contract with the Galaxy on July 12, 2024.

== Playing style ==
A set-piece specialist, Parente has been described by head coach Greg Vanney as "a balancer, a guy who plays fast, gives his time to other people. He has a high level of field awareness, which allows him to play fast and find good positions."

== Personal life ==
Born in the United States, Parente is of Italian descent.

== Career statistics ==
As of match played May 17, 2025

Club	Season	League			Playoffs		National cup		Continental		Total	
Club	Season	Division	Apps	Goals	Apps	Goals	Apps	Goals	Apps	Goals	Apps	Goals
Flint City Bucks	2019	USL League Two	5	1	0	0	—		—		5	1
Columbus Crew	2021	Major League Soccer	6	0	—		—		3	0	9	0
Columbus Crew	2022	Major League Soccer	0	0	0	0	1	0	—		1	0
Columbus Crew	2023	Major League Soccer	7	0	0	0	3	2	0	0	10	2
Columbus Crew	Total		13	0	0	0	4	2	3	0	20	2
Columbus Crew 2	2022	MLS Next Pro	16	6	3	2	—		—		19	8
Columbus Crew 2	2023	MLS Next Pro	5	3	0	0	—		—		5	3
Columbus Crew 2	Total		21	9	3	2	—		—		24	11
Ventura County FC	2024	MLS Next Pro	21	3	0	0	2	0	—		23	3
LA Galaxy	2024	Major League Soccer	6	0	0	0	0	0	—		6	0
LA Galaxy	2025	Major League Soccer	11	0	0	0	0	0	4	0	15	0
LA Galaxy	Total		17	0	0	0	0	0	4	0	21	0
Career total			77	13	3	2	6	2	7	0	93	17

== Honors ==
Flint City Bucks

- USL League Two: 2019

Columbus Crew

- Campeones Cup: 2021
- MLS Cup: 2023

Columbus Crew 2

- MLS Next Pro: 2022

LA Galaxy

- MLS Cup: 2024

Individual

- MLS Next Pro Best XI: 2022
