= Darlington Nagbe =

American soccer player (born 1990)

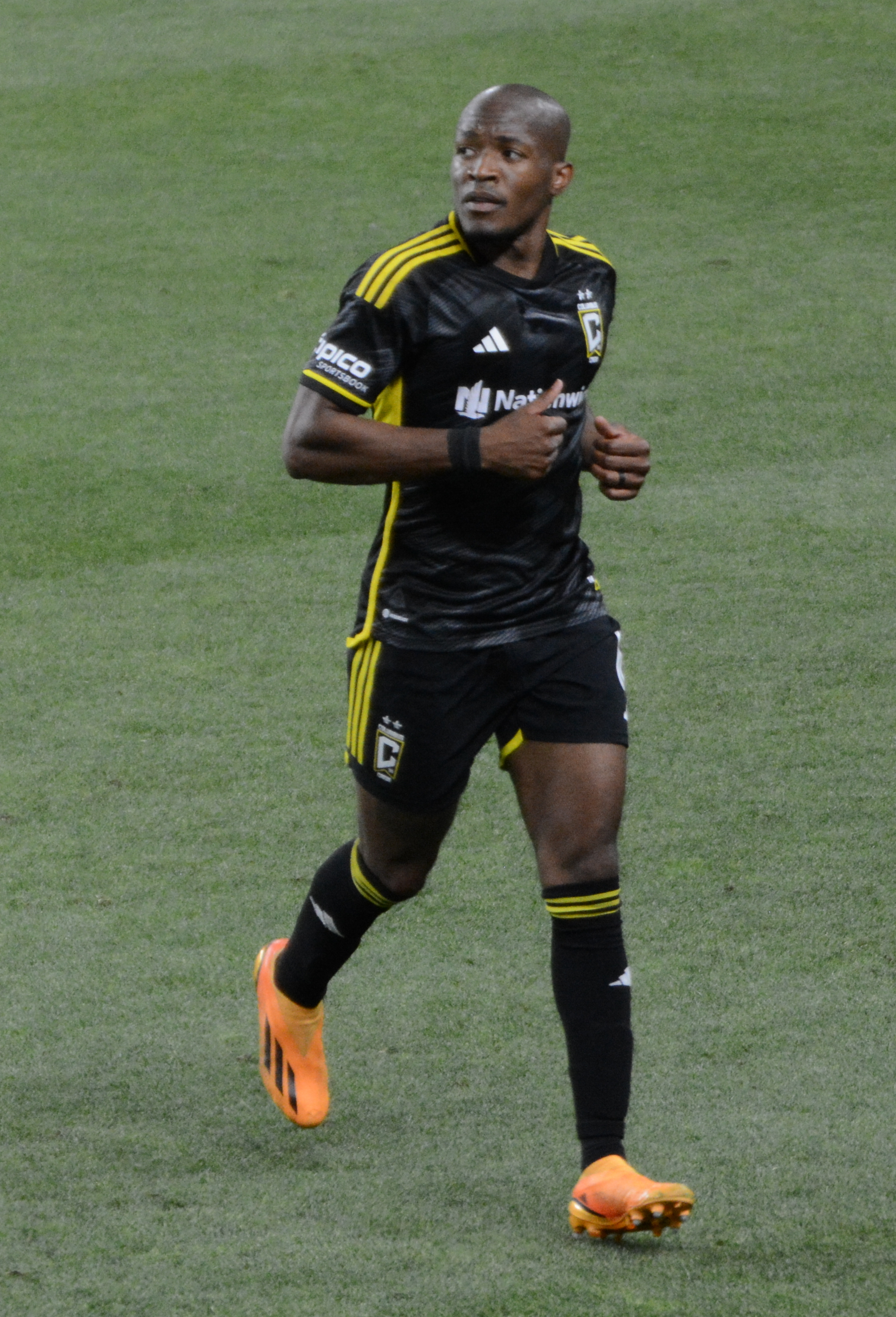
- Nagbe with the Columbus Crew in 2023

Personal information
- Full name: Darlington Joephillip Nagbe
- Date of birth: July 19, 1990 (age 36)
- Place of birth: Monrovia, Liberia
- Height: 5 ft 9 in (1.75 m)
- Position: Midfielder

Youth career
- 2001–2007: Internationals SC

College career
Years	Team	Apps	(Gls)
2008–2010	Akron Zips	73	(19)

Senior career*
Years	Team	Apps	(Gls)
2007–2010	Cleveland Internationals	18	(7)
2011–2017	Portland Timbers	214	(27)
2018–2019	Atlanta United	56	(2)
2020–2025	Columbus Crew	175	(9)
Total		463	(45)

International career
2015–2018	United States	25	(1)
Medal record
Representing United States
Winner	CONCACAF Gold Cup	2017
- * Club domestic league appearances and goals

Darlington Joephillip Nagbe (born July 19, 1990) is a former professional soccer player who played as a midfielder. Born in Liberia, he played for the United States national team.

After emigrating from Liberia due to the First Liberian Civil War, Nagbe's family eventually settled in Lakewood, Ohio where he played club soccer for the Cleveland Internationals. He played college soccer at the University of Akron, where he won an NCAA title and the Hermann Trophy. Professionally, Nagbe appeared in over 400 games, spending the first seven seasons of his career with the Portland Timbers, where he won MLS Cup with the club in 2015. He was acquired by Atlanta United FC at the conclusion of the 2017 season, where he would go on to win a second MLS Cup, a U.S. Open Cup trophy, and the Campeones Cup. At the end of the 2019 season, he was traded to the Columbus Crew, where he would win two more MLS Cup titles, a Leagues Cup trophy, as well as an additional Campeones Cup.

Nagbe made his international debut in November 2015, appearing for the United States in a 2018 FIFA World Cup qualifying match. He went on to earn 25 caps for the national team, winning the 2017 CONCACAF Gold Cup during his tenure.

== Early years ==
Nagbe was born in Liberia and left the country as a five-month-old when his mother fled due to the First Liberian Civil War, taking him and his brother with her. They joined her husband Joe Nagbe, a professional soccer player, and his career took the family to France, Greece, and Switzerland before they eventually settled in the Cleveland area in 2001 when Darlington was 11 years old.

Nagbe grew up in Lakewood, Ohio, where he attended Lakewood High School and then St. Edward High School, scoring 18 goals and adding 10 assists as a senior. He was a member of the Region II ODP team, was a 2007 adidas ESP All-Star and was member of the Ohio North ODP team, as well as winning four Ohio North state club titles with the Cleveland Internationals. Nagbe also participated in the U.S. Soccer Development Academy with the Internationals.

=== College and amateur career ===
Nagbe played college soccer at the University of Akron, scoring 19 goals and contributing 19 assists in 73 matches during three collegiate seasons. He was a Soccer America All-Freshman first-team honoree, and was named All-MAC Newcomer of the Year as a freshman in 2008. As a sophomore in 2009, Nagbe was named to the NSCAA All-America Second Team, Soccer America MVP Second Team, Top Drawer Soccer Team of the Season Second Team, All-Great Lakes Region First Team, and All-Mid-American Conference First Team. In 2010, Nagbe helped the Akron Zips to their first national championship, a 1–0 win against Louisville; he was subsequently named to the NSCAA All-America First Team, the All-MAC First Team, the College Cup All-Tournament Team, and was honored with the Hermann Trophy as the 2010 College Soccer Player of the Year.

During his college years, Nagbe also played four seasons with the Cleveland Internationals in the USL Premier Development League, scoring seven goals in 18 league appearances.

== Club career ==
=== Portland Timbers ===
==== 2011 season ====
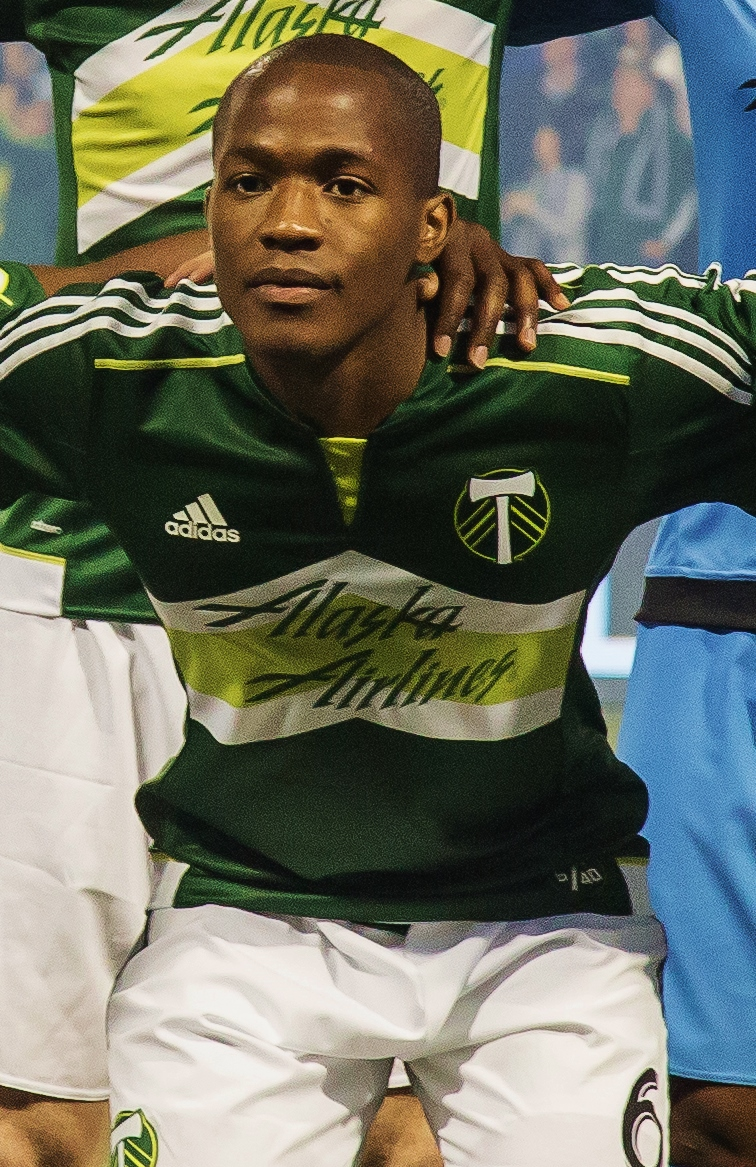
Nagbe with the Portland Timbers in 2015

After signing a Generation Adidas contract to forgo his remaining year of college eligibility, Nagbe was selected by Portland Timbers in the first round (second overall) of the 2011 MLS SuperDraft. After missing the first few weeks of the season due to hernia surgery, Nagbe made his professional debut on April 2, 2011, in a 1–1 draw against the New England Revolution. Nagbe scored his first goal in Major League Soccer with a volley, which was eventually named the 2011 MLS Goal of the Year, in a 2–1 loss to Sporting Kansas City on July 2, 2011.

==== 2012 season ====
Nagbe would score the first brace of his career, coming against Real Salt Lake on March 12. Nagbe's next three goals would come in successive games, as he ended the 2012 season with six total goals. He struggled to find a true role in the direct attacking system deployed by the Timbers, but was mostly deployed as an attacking midfielder.

==== 2013 season ====
On January 8, Nagbe was reunited with his coach at Akron, Caleb Porter, after Porter was officially hired by Portland. Nagbe finished the 2013 season with 11 goals scored across all competitions, playing mainly on the left wing. Highlights include four goals scored against FC Dallas across four matches, as well as a goal in the postseason—Portland's first postseason appearance—in the first leg of the quarter-finals against rivals Seattle Sounders FC. After the season, Nagbe was awarded with the individual Fair Play Award, after committing only eight fouls and receiving one yellow card in 2,848 minutes of regular-season play.

==== 2014 season ====
The 2014 season saw Nagbe spend the majority of his time on the right wing and ended the year with two total goals, the first goal coming as a game-tying goal in the 93rd minute of a U.S. Open Cup match with Seattle Sounders FC, and the second goal coming on the last day of the season against FC Dallas. He would set a career high in assists with seven.

==== 2015 season ====
Nagbe was a part of Portland's MLS Cup-winning campaign in 2015 and started the year playing as an attacking midfielder covering for Diego Valeri, who was recovering from an ACL tear. After Valeri's return to fitness, Nagbe returned to the wings, before moving into a more central role permanently during the last three games of the regular season—a move that saw him score three of his five total goals. He also received the Fair Play Award for the second time in his career, committing only 11 fouls and receiving no bookings.

"It’s almost like he’s a magician on the field. When you think you’re going to win the ball from him, you have no chance.”

— Rodney Wallace, Nagbe's teammate on the Portland Timbers.

==== 2016 season ====
Before the beginning of the 2016 season, the Timbers announced they had re-signed Nagbe to a contract extension. Nagbe was injured after a hard tackle from Nigel de Jong on April 11, during a game against the LA Galaxy. Nagbe was stretchered off the field and left the stadium in a wheelchair. The injury turned out to be a sprained ankle and he missed just two matches before returning to action. De Jong, who received a yellow card for the tackle, was later suspended for three matches. In July 2016, he was included in the roster for the MLS All-Star Game, making the squad for the first time in his career. After the season, Nagbe was close to making a £3 million move to Scottish side Celtic, but the deal fell through and Nagbe remained with Portland for 2017.

==== 2017 season ====
During 2017, Nagbe was moved all over the field. He scored a goal from outside the box in a 3–1 win away from home on April 8, and then scored a "stunning" solo goal against the Vancouver Whitecaps for a 2–1 win on April 22. At the conclusion of the 2017 season, the Timbers included Nagbe in trade talks after head coach Caleb Porter stepped down, and with Nagbe having requested a new contract during the middle of the season.

=== Atlanta United ===
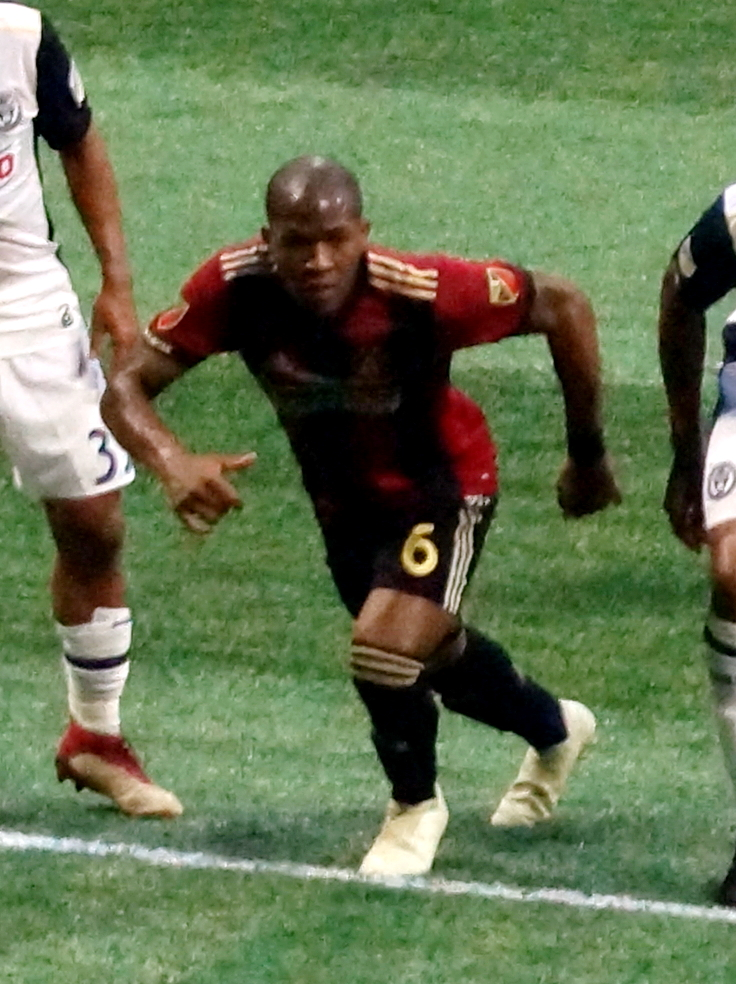
Nagbe playing for Atlanta United FC in 2018

On December 13, 2017, Atlanta United FC finalized a trade to acquire Nagbe for $1.05 million in allocation money, with a potential addition of another $600,000 dependent on performance bonuses. He joined a prolific Atlanta attack that scored the second-most goals in 2017 under Tata Martino.

==== 2018 season ====
In his first season in Atlanta, Nagbe made 17 straight starting appearances before missing nearly three months due to an adductor strain suffered on June 24, 2018, against the Portland Timbers. Nagbe was once again selected to participate in the MLS All-Star Game, but would miss the game due to his injury. After making his return to play on September 15 against the Colorado Rapids, Nagbe was not selected for the subsequent match on the 19th to avoid straining his body with a midweek game, due to a lack of match fitness. After his full return to fitness, Nagbe would not miss a game for the remainder of the season, starting all five of the remaining regular season games, as well as starting all five playoff games, helping Atlanta United to their first MLS Cup, a 2–0 victory over the Portland Timbers. Head coach Gerardo "Tata" Martino commented on Nagbe's impact during the 2018 season: "He understood every moment of the match. He knew when to speed things up, when to play laterally and he was always very accurate in his passing. It was very easy to construct each of our attacks."

==== 2019 season ====
At the outset of the 2019 preseason, Nagbe informed new head coach Frank De Boer of some self-described "personal issues" he was dealing with, mentioning his intention to arrive late for preseason training and to leave early due to those issues. Reports also suggested that Nagbe expressed interest in a move to an Ohio-based club in order to be closer to family, with Felipe Cardenas of The Athletic reporting that "Nagbe was disheartened after the club 'dragged their feet' during contract negotiations following the 2018 season, as both parties had previously agreed to sign a multi-year deal upon Nagbe’s trade to Atlanta from Portland." Nevertheless, Nagbe was an integral part of a team that won the 2019 U.S. Open Cup, as well as the Campeones Cup. He would go on to start in 44 games and appear in 46 across all competitions, missing just the midweek clash at Vancouver on May 15. Atlanta United offered Nagbe a multi-year extension in the middle of the season, which was rejected by Nagbe. At the end of the season, Nagbe was traded to the Columbus Crew.

=== Columbus Crew ===
On November 13, 2019, the Columbus Crew acquired Nagbe in exchange for $1.05 million in total allocation money, as well as an international roster spot. Nagbe was once again reunited with his coach at Akron and Portland, Caleb Porter.

==== 2020 season ====
During the COVID-shorted season, Nagbe would appear in 15 of a possible 23 regular season games, missing eight games due to an injury suffered in a match against the Philadelphia Union. On August 20, Nagbe scored his first goal for Columbus in a 3–0 win against the Chicago Fire, a goal that would be named the 2020 MLS Goal of the Year, Nagbe's second time winning the award. After leading the Crew through the regular season and playoffs, he would miss the MLS Cup Final due to testing positive for COVID-19. Columbus would end up winning the game, giving Nagbe his third MLS Cup.

==== 2021 season ====
Starting in Columbus' first match of the 2021 CONCACAF Champions League, Nagbe suffered an injury in that game and would go on to miss the following two matches: the home leg of the Champions League fixture and the opening match of the MLS season. After returning from his injury, Nagbe would not miss a game for the rest of the season, starting in all of the remaining games, including the 2–0 victory against Cruz Azul in the Campeones Cup.

==== 2022 season ====
During the 2022 season, Nagbe started every single league match for Columbus, scoring three goals—the most he had scored in a season since 2017. These goals included a 95th-minute equalizer in a 1–1 road draw against the New York Red Bulls on March 20, the third goal in a 3–0 home win against D.C. United on April 30, and the game-winner in the Crew's 2–1 road victory over Toronto FC on June 29. Nagbe was again named to the MLS All-Star Game, playing the first half of a 2–1 victory against the Liga MX All-Stars.

==== 2023 season ====
The 2023 season began with the departure of head coach Caleb Porter as well as club captain Jonathan Mensah, resulting in Nagbe assuming the role of the new club captain. While captaining his side, Nagbe played in all 34 regular season matches and led Columbus to win the MLS Cup over LAFC 2–1. It was Nagbe's fourth MLS Cup, making him the tenth player in MLS history to win four titles. At the end of the 2023 regular season, Nagbe was re-signed by Columbus to a contract extension through the 2025 campaign, with an option for another year.

==== 2024 and 2025 seasons ====
In the 2024 season, Nagbe was selected by MLS commissioner Don Garber to compete in the 2024 MLS All-Star Game in Columbus on July 24. On August 28, Nagbe helped win the 2024 Leagues Cup by defeating Los Angeles FC 3–1 in the final.

On October 7, 2025, Nagbe announced he would be retiring following the end of the 2025 MLS Cup playoffs. On November 8, Nagbe played his final game of professional soccer in a 2–1 loss to cross-state rivals FC Cincinnati. Columbus' defeat marked the end of their playoffs campaign after they forced a third game after defeating FC Cincinnati at home in their previous game.

== International career ==
Nagbe obtained American citizenship in September 2015, and shortly after, he was included in the U.S. National Team roster on November 6, 2015, for two 2018 FIFA World Cup qualifying matches against St. Vincent and the Grenadines and Trinidad and Tobago. Making his international debut on November 13, 2015, Nagbe entered the match as a substitute in the 64th minute.

Nagbe scored his first goal for the U.S. National Team on May 25, 2016, in the 90th minute via a volley to secure a 1–0 victory in a friendly match against Ecuador. He was added to the squad for the knockout stage of the 2017 CONCACAF Gold Cup, which the United States won. Nagbe started all three games in the knockout stage and was named to the tournament's Best XI. He also took part in the United States' unsuccessful World Cup qualifying campaign, starting seven of 10 matches in the hexagonal as the United States did not qualify for the tournament for the first time since 1986. Nagbe has since declined any further call-ups, citing wanting to spend more time with his family.

== Style of play ==
“Selfishness doesn't fit into team sports. The ball must be shared. However, Darlington Nagbe could very well keep it at his feet for an entire match, and I bet no one would take it away. The captain of Columbus is a humble soul and an outstanding football player.”

— Diego Valeri, former Portland Timbers teammate

Deployed as either a winger or an attacking midfielder at Akron and early in his pro career in Portland, Nagbe moved to a "withdrawn, box-to-box role" in the middle of the 2015 season and then further settled into a deeper role later in his career. A calming influence in the midfield, Nagbe was described as a "facilitator" and an "orchestrator" due to his composure, tempo-setting, and skill in maintaining possession under pressure. His ability to create and draw fouls while under pressure made him the most fouled player in Major League Soccer history. He was frequently praised as being a player with superb technical ability and high soccer IQ, with former coach Frank de Boer describing him as "the cement between the bricks." Thanks to his deft first touch, ability to glide past defenders, and fluid comfort on the ball, he was able to help his team transition from defense to attack in the blink of an eye. Nagbe was also an intricate and precise passer, and was adept at working in tight spaces. Additionally, he possessed the capability to score the occasional goal of the season. Nagbe commented on his style of play: "I feel like as a player, the more I get on the ball, the more comfortable I get and the easier it is to make plays."

== Personal life ==
Nagbe is the son of Somah Nagbe and Joe Nagbe, the former captain of the Liberian national team. He has two younger sisters, Martha and Seta, and one older brother, Joe Jr. In 2012, he married Felicia Houtz, and the couple have a daughter named Mila and sons Kingston and Isaiah.

Nagbe received his U.S. green card in 2012, thus making him a domestic player for MLS roster purposes, and became a United States citizen in September 2015.

He has stated that his sporting idol is Thierry Henry.

== Career statistics ==
=== Club ===
Appearances and goals by club, season and competition
Club	Season	League			U.S. Open Cup		Playoffs		CONCACAF		Other		Total	
Club	Season	Division	Apps	Goals	Apps	Goals	Apps	Goals	Apps	Goals	Apps	Goals	Apps	Goals
Portland Timbers	2011	Major League Soccer	28	2	0	0	—		—		—		28	2
Portland Timbers	2012	Major League Soccer	33	6	1	0	—		—		—		34	6
Portland Timbers	2013	Major League Soccer	34	9	4	1	4	1	—		—		42	11
Portland Timbers	2014	Major League Soccer	32	1	1	1	—		2 (Note: Appearances in CONCACAF Champions League/Cup)	0	—		35	2
Portland Timbers	2015	Major League Soccer	33	5	1	0	6	0	—		—		40	5
Portland Timbers	2016	Major League Soccer	27	1	1	0	—		3	1	—		31	2
Portland Timbers	2017	Major League Soccer	27	3	0	0	2	0	—		—		29	3
Portland Timbers	Total		214	27	8	2	12	1	5	1	—		239	31
Atlanta United FC	2018	Major League Soccer	23	0	0	0	5	0	—		—		28	0
Atlanta United FC	2019	Major League Soccer	33	2	5	0	3	0	4	0	1 (Note: Appearance in Campeones Cup)	0	46	2
Atlanta United FC	Total		56	2	5	0	8	0	4	0	1	0	74	2
Columbus Crew	2020	Major League Soccer	15 (Note: Includes three appearances in MLS is Back Tournament group stage)	1	—		3	1	—		1 (Note: Appearance in MLS is Back Tournament knockout stage)	0	19	2
Columbus Crew	2021	Major League Soccer	33	2	—		—		3	0	1	0	37	2
Columbus Crew	2022	Major League Soccer	34	3	0	0	—		—		—		34	3
Columbus Crew	2023	Major League Soccer	34	3	1	0	6	1	—		3 (Note: Appearances in Leagues Cup)	0	44	4
Columbus Crew	2024	Major League Soccer	29	0	—		2	0	7	0	6 (Note: Five appearances in Leagues Cup, one appearance in Campeones Cup)	0	44	0
Columbus Crew	2025	Major League Soccer	30	0	—		3	0	2	0	3	0	38	0
Columbus Crew	Total		175	9	1	0	14	2	12	0	14	0	216	11
Career total			445	38	14	2	34	3	21	1	15	0	529	44

=== International ===
Appearances and goals by national team and year
National team	Year	Apps	Goals
United States	2015	2	0
United States	2016	8	1
United States	2017	14	0
United States	2018	1	0
Total		25	1

Scores and results list the United States' goal tally first.

List of international goals scored by Darlington Nagbe
No.	Date	Venue	Opponent	Score	Result	Competition
1	May 25, 2016	Toyota Stadium, Frisco, United States	Ecuador	1–0	1–0	Friendly

== Honors ==
Akron Zips

- NCAA Division I Men's Soccer Tournament: 2010

Portland Timbers

- MLS Cup: 2015

Atlanta United

- MLS Cup: 2018
- Campeones Cup: 2019
- U.S. Open Cup: 2019

Columbus Crew

- MLS Cup: 2020, 2023
- Campeones Cup: 2021
- Leagues Cup: 2024
- CONCACAF Champions Cup runner-up: 2024

United States

- CONCACAF Gold Cup: 2017

Individual

- Hermann Trophy Winner: 2010
- MLS Goal of the Year: 2011, 2020
- MLS Fair Play Award: 2013, 2015, 2019
- MLS All-Star: 2016, 2022, 2024
- CONCACAF Gold Cup Best XI: 2017
- Audi Goals Drive Progress Impact Award: 2024
- MLS 400 Games Club
