= Jacen Russell-Rowe =

Canadian soccer player (born 2002)

- Russell-Rowe in 2026

Personal information
- Full name: Jacen Rex Orlando Russell-Rowe
- Date of birth: September 13, 2002 (age 24)
- Place of birth: Toronto, Ontario, Canada
- Height: 6 ft 0 in (1.83 m)
- Position: Forward

Team information
- Current team: Toulouse
- Number: 13

Youth career
- 2005–2017: Brampton YSC
- 2017–2019: Toronto

College career
Years	Team	Apps	(Gls)
2020–2021	Maryland Terrapins	26	(4)

Senior career*
Years	Team	Apps	(Gls)
2018	Toronto III	1	(0)
2019	Toronto II	1	(0)
2022	Columbus Crew 2	19	(21)
2022	→ Columbus Crew (loan)	2	(0)
2022–2026	Columbus Crew	78	(16)
2023	→ Columbus Crew 2 (loan)	1	(1)
2026–	Toulouse	24	(4)

International career^{‡}
2019	Canada U17	7	(4)
2023–	Canada	12	(0)
2026	Canada B	1	(1)
- * Club domestic league appearances and goals as of November 22, 2026 ‡ National team caps and goals as of November 16, 2026

Jacen Rex Orlando Russell-Rowe (born September 13, 2002) is a Canadian professional soccer player who plays as a forward for Ligue 1 club Toulouse and the Canada national team.

== Early life ==
He began playing soccer at age three with Brampton YSC. He later joined the Toronto FC Academy, scoring 19 goals in 13 games for the U-16/17 set up in the 2018-19 season.

== College career ==
In 2020, he committed to the University of Maryland, College Park where he would play for the Terrapins. In his debut for Maryland on February 19, 2021, he scored a goal from 30 yards out against the Penn State Nittany Lions for his first NCAA goal.

On March 7, he scored the only goal in a 1–0 victory over the Wisconsin Badgers to give Maryland its first victory of the season. For his freshman season, he was named to the 2020/21 Big Ten All-Freshman Team.

== Club career ==
=== Toronto FC ===
In 2018, he made one appearance for Toronto FC III in League1 Ontario. On July 3, 2019, he made his professional debut with Toronto FC II in USL League One (while on an academy contract), coming on as a substitute against FC Tucson.

=== Columbus Crew 2 ===
In March 2022 Russell-Rowe signed with MLS Next Pro side Columbus Crew 2. He scored his first professional goal on April 10 against Philadelphia Union II. On May 28, he signed a short term loan with the first team, Columbus Crew, ahead of their MLS game against Atlanta United. On June 18, he signed another short-term loan with the Crew for their match against Charlotte FC, in which he appeared as a substitute for his MLS debut.

Russell-Rowe was named MLS Next Pro Player of the Month for both May and June 2022. Russell-Rowe won the 2022 MLS Next Pro MVP, the 2022 MLS Next Pro Golden Boot Award after leading the league with 21 goals and was also named to the MLS Next Pro Best XI. On June 29, 2022, Columbus traded $50,000 in General Allocation Money to acquire his homegrown rights from Toronto FC, and signed him to their first team's roster. He made his first MLS start the same day against Toronto FC, recording two assists in a 2–1 victory. Russell-Rowe scored his first MLS goal on March 25, 2023, in a 6–1 victory versus Atlanta United.

=== Toulouse ===
On February 2, 2026, the Crew announced that they had sold Russell-Rowe to Ligue 1 side Toulouse for an undisclosed fee. He made his Ligue 1 debut on February 8, 2026, coming on as a substitute in the 73rd minute against Angers.

On April 25, 2026, he scored his first goal for Toulouse in a 2–2 draw against Monaco. He finished the 2025–26 Ligue 1 season with 13 league appearances and one goal in his first half-season in France.

== International career ==
Born in Canada, Russell-Rowe is of Jamaican descent. In 2016, he made his debut in the Canadian youth program when was called to a training camp for the Canada U15 team.

Russell-Rowe represented Canada's Under-17 side at the 2019 CONCACAF U-17 Championship. He was subsequently named to the team for the 2019 FIFA U-17 World Cup, where he scored both of Canada's goals at the tournament. In 2019, he was a nominee for Canadian Youth International Player of the Year.

In May 2023, Russell-Rowe was listed on the Canada preliminary roster for the 2023 CONCACAF Nations League Finals. In June 2023, he was named to the final squad for the 2023 CONCACAF Gold Cup. Russell-Rowe made his debut in the tournament opener against Guadeloupe on June 27, where he scored an own-goal in an eventual 2-2 draw.

In June 2024, Russell-Rowe was named to Canada's squad for the 2024 Copa América.

On January 17, 2026, he scored his first goal for Canada in a non-FIFA international friendly against Guatemala.

In May 2026, Russell-Rowe was named to Canada's 32-player training camp roster in Charlotte, North Carolina, ahead of the 2026 FIFA World Cup on home soil, but was not included in the final 26-player squad for the tournament.

== Career statistics ==
=== Club ===
As of match played November 6, 2026

Appearances and goals by club, season and competition
Club	Season	League			Playoffs		National cup		League cup		Continental		Total	
Club	Season	Division	Apps	Goals	Apps	Goals	Apps	Goals	Apps	Goals	Apps	Goals	Apps	Goals
Toronto FC III	2018	League1 Ontario	1	0	—		—		0	0	—		1	0
Toronto FC II	2019	USL League One	1	0	—		—		—		—		1	0
Columbus Crew 2	2022	MLS Next Pro	19	21	3	4	—		—		—		22	25
Columbus Crew (loan)	2022	MLS	2	0	0	0	0	0	—		—		2	0
Columbus Crew	2022	MLS	4	0	0	0	0	0	—		—		4	0
Columbus Crew	2023	MLS	21	4	2	0	3	0	2	0	—		28	4
Columbus Crew	2024	MLS	22	5	2	0	0	0	4	1	8	2	36	8
Columbus Crew	2025	MLS	31	7	3	2	0	0	3	0	2	1	39	10
Columbus Crew	Columbus total		80	16	7	2	3	0	9	1	10	3	109	22
Columbus Crew 2 (loan)	2023	MLS Next Pro	1	1	0	0	—		—		—		1	1
Toulouse	2025–26	Ligue 1	13	1	—		2	0	—		—		15	1
Toulouse	2026–27	Ligue 1	10	2	—		0	0	—		—		10	2
Toulouse	Total		23	3	0	0	2	0	0	0	0	0	25	3
Career total			125	41	10	6	5	0	9	1	10	3	159	51

=== International ===
As of match played November 16, 2026

Appearances and goals by national team and year
National team	Year	Apps	Goals
Canada	2023	4	0
Canada	2024	3	0
Canada	2025	0	0
Canada	2026	5	0
Total		12	0

== Honours ==
Columbus Crew

- MLS Cup: 2023
- Leagues Cup: 2024
- CONCACAF Champions Cup runner-up: 2024
