= Henry García =

Nicaraguan footballer

Personal information
- Full name: Henry Antonio García Orozco
- Date of birth: 3 August 1991 (age 35)
- Place of birth: Diriamba, Nicaragua
- Height: 1.55 m (5 ft 1 in)
- Position: Striker

Team information
- Current team: Real Estelí
- Number: 9

Senior career*
Years	Team	Apps	(Gls)
2013–2014	Juventus Managua	31	(6)
2014–2018	UNAN Managua	130	(24)
2018–2019	Real Estelí	41	(10)
2019	Managua	21	(2)
2020–	Real Estelí	35	(5)

International career^{‡}
2012–	Nicaragua	12	(0)
- * Club domestic league appearances and goals as of 6 May 2021. ‡ National team caps and goals as of 24 February 2021.

Henry Antonio García Orozco (born 3 August 1991) is a Nicaraguan footballer who plays as a striker for Liga Primera club Real Estelí FC and the Nicaragua national team.

== Early life ==
Garcìa was born in Diriamba.

== Club career ==
García has played for Juventus Managua, UNAN Managua, Real Estelí and Managua FC in Nicaragua.

== International career ==
García made his senior debut for Nicaragua on 24 February 2012.
