= Developmental roster =

In Major League Soccer, in addition to the senior roster, each team can carry a developmental roster of a certain number of young players whose contracts do not count against the salary cap. The allowable size of developmental rosters has varied throughout its existence: in the 2005 season, it grew to ten from a former limit of six, but for the 2009 season, it was reduced to a limit of four players.

The developmental roster includes Generation adidas (known as Project-40 before 2005) signees, Home-Grown Players, and other players (usually recent college graduates) 25 or younger, called developmental players. Except for the Generation adidas players, whose salaries have no limit and are negotiated individually with the league, developmental players are paid a salary well below the MLS minimum, currently pegged at around $32,504 per year. A player is graduated from the developmental roster to the senior roster at the team's discretion, a decision which usually results from a player passing the age limit or becoming an important member of the squad.

Notable former developmental players include: Davy Arnaud, Nat Borchers, Alejandro Moreno, Jack Jewsbury, Chris Wondolowski and Troy Perkins.

== Sources ==
- 2009 MLS Player Rules and Regulations Summary
