= Issa Tall =

French soccer executive

Personal information
- Nationality: French
- Born: January 20, 1988 (age 38) Mulhouse, France
- Education: Adelphi University
- Occupation: General Manager
- Years active: 2014–present
- Employer: Columbus Crew

Sport
- Sport: Association football
- College team: Adelphi University

Issa Tall (born January 20, 1988) is a French soccer executive and former collegiate soccer player and coach.

== Playing career ==
As a youth player, Tall competed for Greka Europe high school for four seasons, winning two regional titles and a French cup in the process. In 2009, Tall moved to the United States to study at Adelphi University. There he played soccer for three seasons, winning national and all-conference honors in the process.

== Executive career ==
Tall joined Toronto FC in 2014 as a part of their Player Personnel and Scouting Department. He departed in 2016 to join FIFA in Zurich as a member of the Federation's Team Services and Competition Department, returning to club football with the Columbus Crew in 2019 as the assistant general manager of player personnel & strategy. During Tall's tenure as assistant general manager, the club won two MLS Cup championships in 2020 and 2023 respectively, along with the 2021 Campeones Cup. Tall became the sixth general manager of the Columbus Crew in June 2024, following the departure of Tim Bezbatchenko.

== Honors ==
with Columbus Crew and Crew 2:

- 2x MLS Cup Champion (2020, 2023)
- 2021 Campeones Cup Champion
- 2022 MLS Next Pro
- Leagues Cup: 2024

with Toronto FC:

- 2014 Canadian Championship
