= Columbus Crew 2 =

American soccer club in Ohio

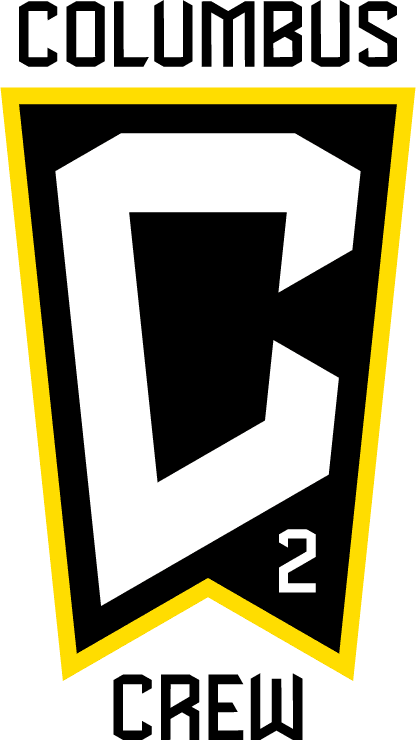
- Full name: Columbus Crew 2
- Nickname: Crew 2, Capybaras
- Founded: December 6, 2021; 4 years ago
- Stadium: Historic Crew Stadium; Columbus, Ohio
- Capacity: 19,968
- Coordinates: 40°0′34″N 82°59′28″W
- Owner: Columbus Crew
- Head coach: Vacant
- League: MLS Next Pro
- 2025: 15th, Eastern Conference; Playoffs: DNQ
- Website: www.columbuscrew.com/crew2/
| Home colors | Away colors |

The Columbus Crew 2 is a professional soccer team based in Columbus, Ohio that competes in the MLS Next Pro league, the third division of American soccer. The team is owned by, and operates as the reserve team of the Major League Soccer club Columbus Crew. The team plays home matches at Historic Crew Stadium. The team was announced as a member of MLS Next Pro on December 6, 2021.

== History ==
On December 6, 2021, the Columbus Crew announced the formation of a reserve team in MLS Next Pro that would begin play in the 2022 season and that they would play at Historic Crew Stadium (the parent club's former home venue) in Columbus, Ohio. At the same time, the club announced its first manager, Corey Wrey, who is the Crew's current Assistant General Manager, a position he will continue to hold. The Crew 2 will be one of 21 teams that play in the newly formed league. On January 28, 2022, the Crew announced that Laurent Courtois would serve as the team's first head coach.

The club played their first match on March 26, 2022, which ended in a 0–2 loss to Inter Miami CF II at DRV PNK Stadium. The first win came the following week with a 1–0 victory over Chicago Fire FC II.

Crew 2 won the first ever MLS Next Pro Cup title, defeating St. Louis City SC 2 4-1 on October 8, 2022.

The following year, the team once again qualified for the playoffs and made it to the Cup Final. They were defeated 1–3 by Austin FC II.

== Players and staff ==
=== Current roster ===
As of September 10, 2025

Note: Flags indicate national team as defined under FIFA eligibility rules; some limited exceptions apply. Players may hold more than one non-FIFA nationality.

| No. | Pos. | Nation | Player |
|---|---|---|---|
| 30 | MF | COL | Nicolás Rincón |
| 31 | FW | CIV | Kevin Gbamblé |
| 33 | MF | USA | Moses Nyeman |
| 36 | DF | USA | Isaac Heffess |
| 37 | DF | JPN | Rui Aoki |
| 39 | FW | FRA | Inza Koné |
| 40 | MF | HON | Johann Chirinos |
| 42 | FW | USA | Brent Adu-Gyamfi |

| No. | Pos. | Nation | Player |
|---|---|---|---|
| 44 | FW | USA | Anthony Alaouieh |
| 50 | MF | USA | Tarun Karumanchi |
| 51 | MF | USA | Gio De Libera |
| 62 | DF | USA | Immanuel Ewing |
| 63 | DF | USA | Gianmarco Di Noto |
| 64 | DF | USA | O'Neal Taylor Jr. |
| 65 | FW | USA | Prince Forfor |
| 73 | FW | MEX | Jorge Salmerón |

First team player
Columbus Crew Academy player

=== Staff ===
As of February 21, 2025

Front office
| Investor-operators | Dee and Jimmy Haslam; JW and Whitney Johnson; Dr. Pete Edwards |
| President | Issa Tall |
| General Manager | |
| Director of Player Development | Dan Lock |
Coaching staff
| Head coach | Vacant |
| Assistant coach | Josh Williams |
| Goalkeeper coach | Alex Blackburn |
| Performance coach | Jorge Gonzalez |
Additional staff
| Manager of Soccer Operations | Claire Quaassdorff |
| Head Athletic Trainer | Sara Kusner |
| Assistant Athletic Trainer | Alex Nucerino |
| Equipment Manager | Caden Fergison |
| Video & Data Analyst | Marc O'Neill |

Last updated: 14:20, February 21, 2025 (UTC)

== Team records ==
=== Season-by-season ===
As of March 19, 2025

| Season | MLS Next Pro | | | | | | | | | | | Playoffs | Top Scorer | |
| Season | P | W | D | L | GF | GA | GD | Pts | Div. | Conf. | Overall | Playoffs | Player | Goals |
|---|---|---|---|---|---|---|---|---|---|---|---|---|---|---|
| 2022 | 24 | 16 | 5 | 3 | 62 | 22 | +40 | 55 | 1st | 1st | 1st | Champions | (Canada) Jacen Russell-Rowe | 21 |
| 2023 | 28 | 16 | 3 | 9 | 58 | 46 | +12 | 54 | 1st | 3rd | 5th | Runner-up | (United States) Gibran Rayo | 12 |
| 2024 | 28 | 11 | 7 | 10 | 51 | 47 | +4 | 45 | 5th | 7th | 12th | Conference Finals | (United States) Chase Adams | 9 |
| 2025 | 28 | 5 | 6 | 17 | 40 | 64 | –24 | 22 | 8th | 15th | 29th | DNQ | (United States) Chase Adams | 10 |

=== Head coaches record ===
As of September 22, 2026

| Name | Nationality | From | To | P | W | D | L | GF | GA | Win% |
|---|---|---|---|---|---|---|---|---|---|---|
| Laurent Courtois | France | January 28, 2022 | January 8, 2024 | 59 | 38 | 8 | 13 | 137 | 77 | 64.41 |
| Kelvin Jones | United States | March 13, 2024 | December 10, 2024 | 28 | 11 | 7 | 10 | 51 | 47 | 39.29 |
| Federico Higuaín | Argentina | January 29, 2025 | September 22, 2026 | 56 | 17 | 15 | 24 | 89 | 107 | 30.36 |

== Honors ==
National
| Competitions | Titles | Seasons |
|---|---|---|
| MLS Next Pro Cup | 1 | 2022 |
| MLS Next Pro Regular Season | 1 | 2022 |
| Eastern Conference | 1 | 2022 |
| Eastern Conference (Playoffs) | 2 | 2022, 2023 |
| Eastern Conference Central Division | 2 | 2022, 2023 |

=== Monthly Awards ===
==== Player of the Month ====
- May 2022: Jacen Russell-Rowe
- June 2022: Jacen Russell-Rowe

==== Goalkeeper of the Month ====
- August 2022: Patrick Schulte

=== Annual Awards ===
==== MLS Next Pro Most Valuable Player ====
- 2022: Jacen Russell-Rowe

==== Golden Boot ====
- 2022: Jacen Russell-Rowe

==== Goalkeeper of the Year ====
- 2022: Patrick Schulte

==== Coach of the Year ====
- 2022: Laurent Courtois

==== MLS Next Pro Cup MVP ====
- 2022: Marco Micaletto

== See also ==
- Columbus Crew
- Columbus Crew Academy
- MLS Next Pro
