= List of CF Montréal head coaches =

List of managers of CF Montréal

CF Montréal is an association football team based in Montréal, Québec, that competes in Major League Soccer (MLS). Founded in 1992 as the Montreal Impact, they began playing in the MLS in 2012 as the league's nineteenth franchise and third Canadian club. Montréal has had ten permanent head coaches.

The longest-serving head coach is Mauro Biello, who managed the club for 92 league and playoff matches over part of the 2015 season and the entirety of the 2016 and 2017 seasons. While no head coach won more than one major trophy in their time with the club, Frank Klopas won the 2014 Canadian Championship, and finished runners up in the 2015 Canadian Championship and the 2014-15 CONCACAF Champions League, the first time a Canadian club reached the final of that competition. Wilfried Nancy holds the best win percentage across league and playoff matches, with a 47.14% win rate over his 70 matches.

== List of managers ==
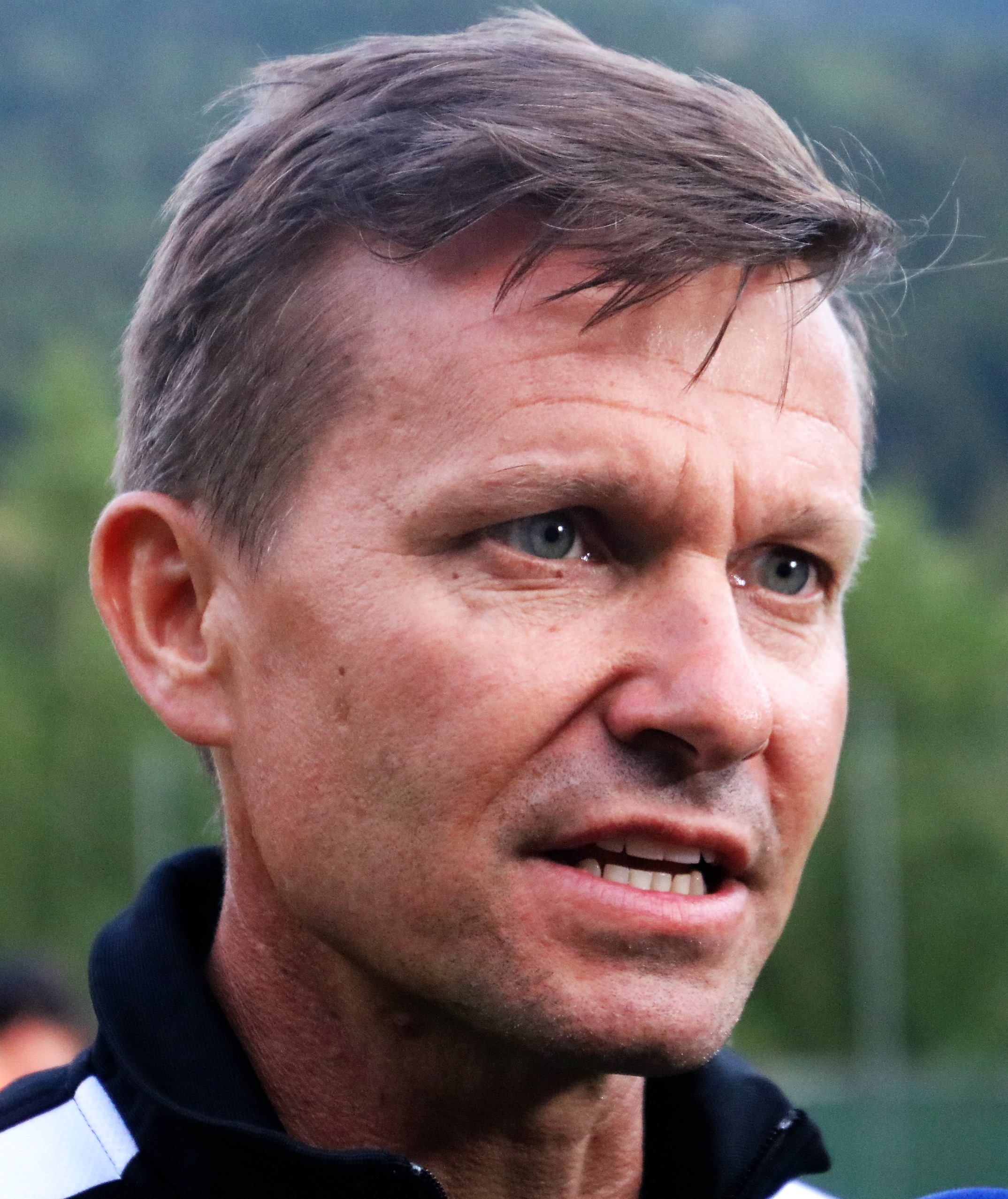
Jesse Marsch was the inaugural manager of the Impact.

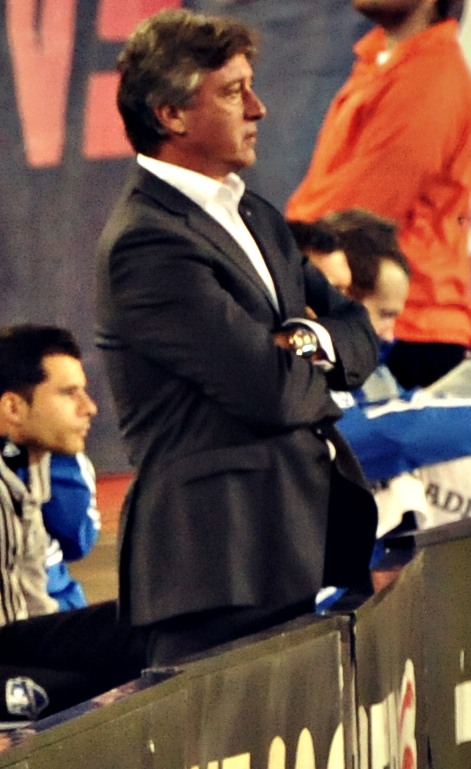
Marco Schällibaum

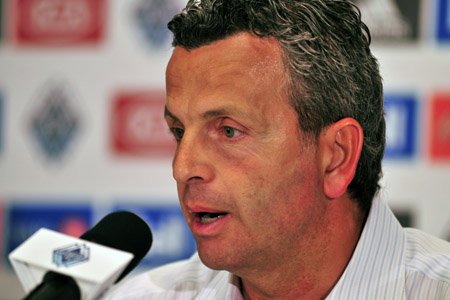
Frank Klopas

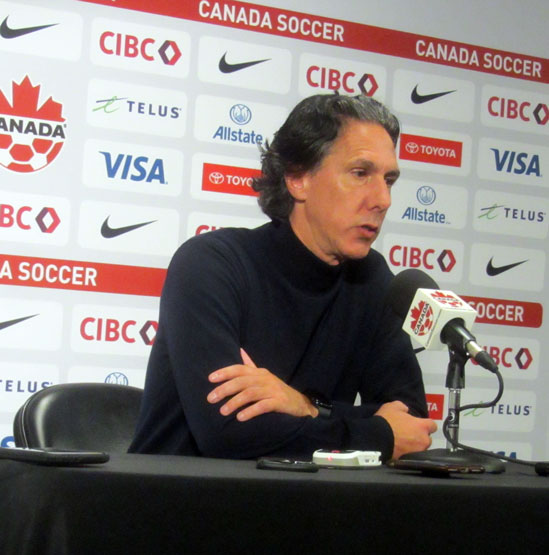
Mauro Biello

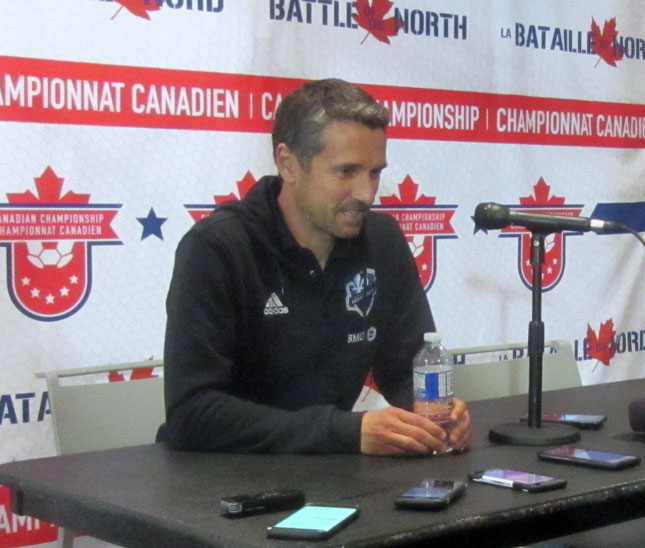
Rémi Garde

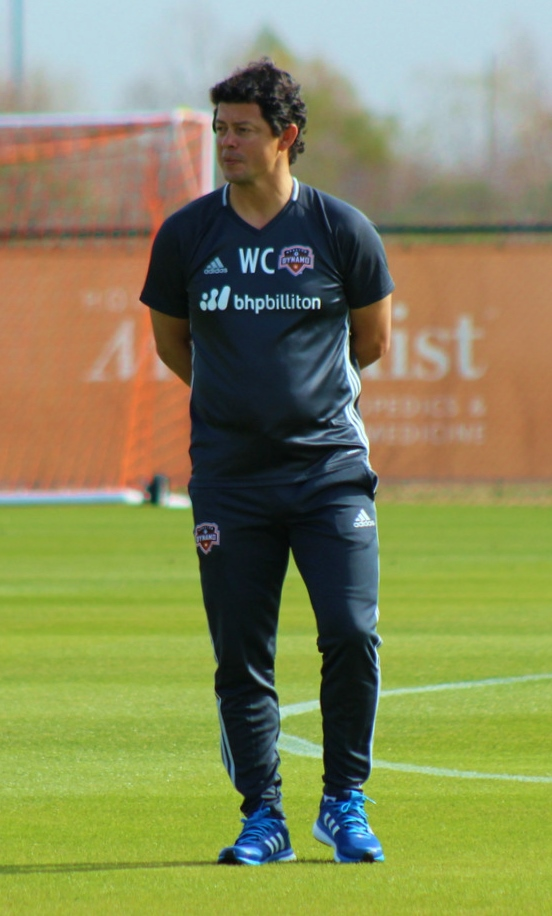
Wílmer Cabrera

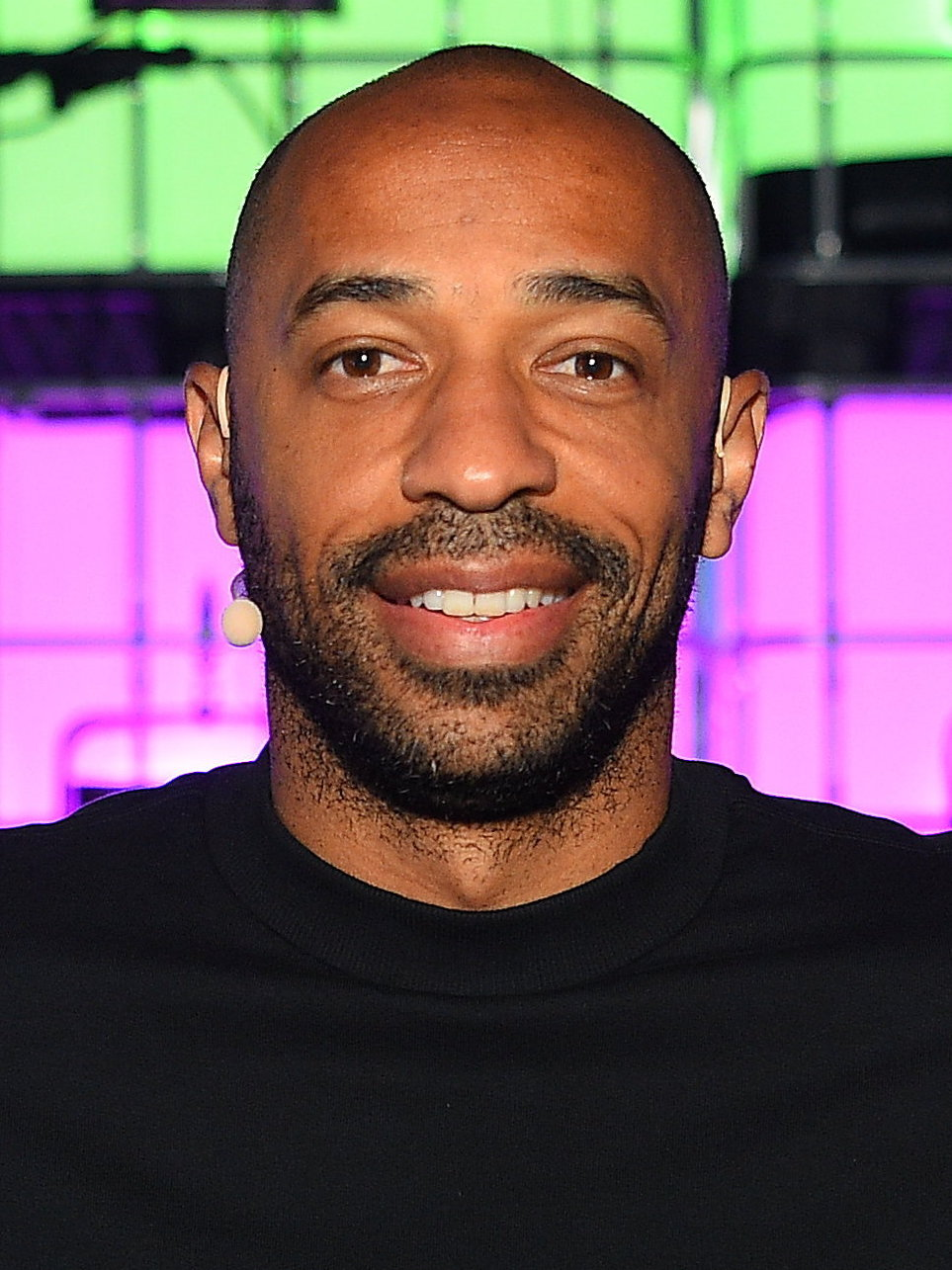
Thierry Henry

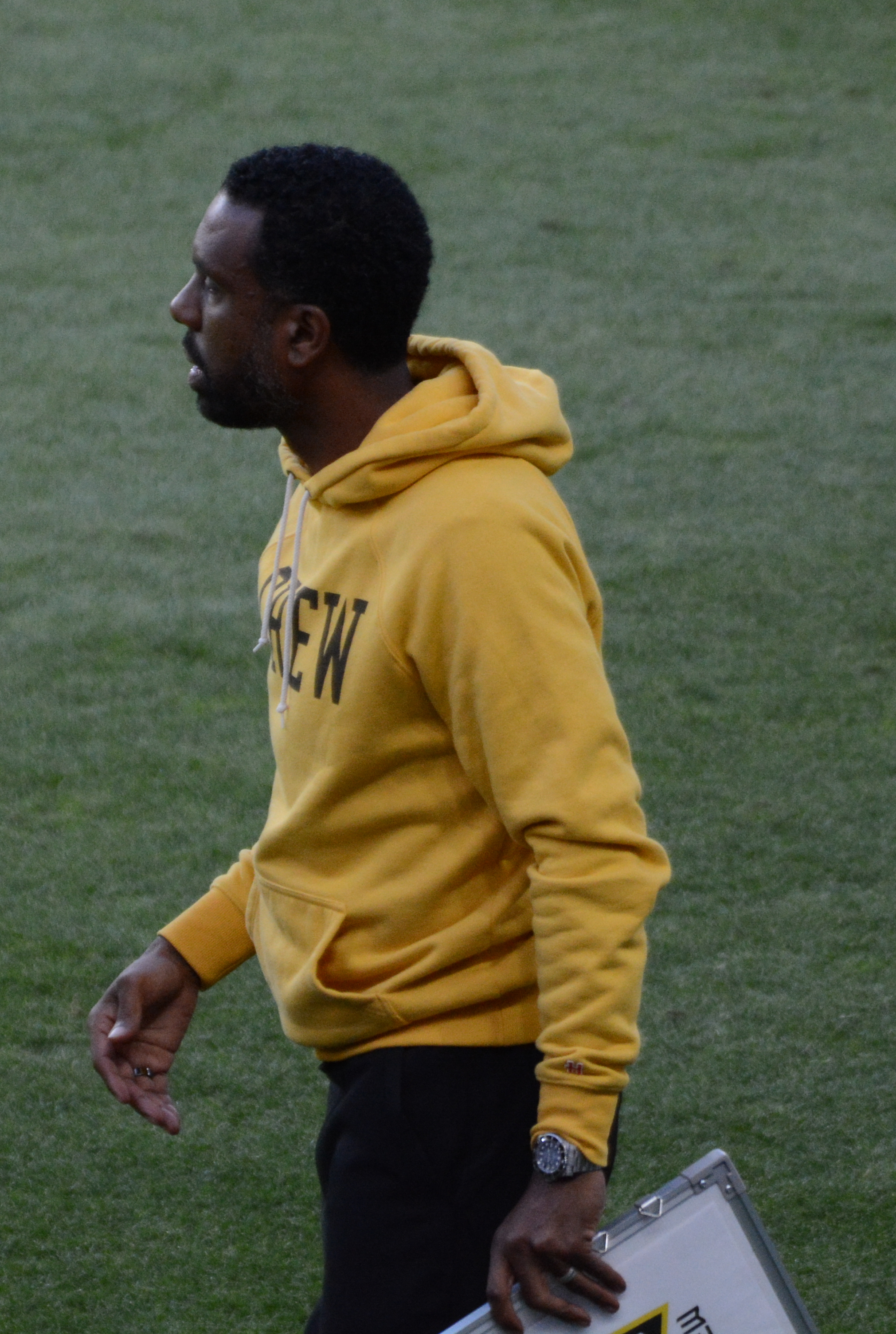
Wilfried Nancy

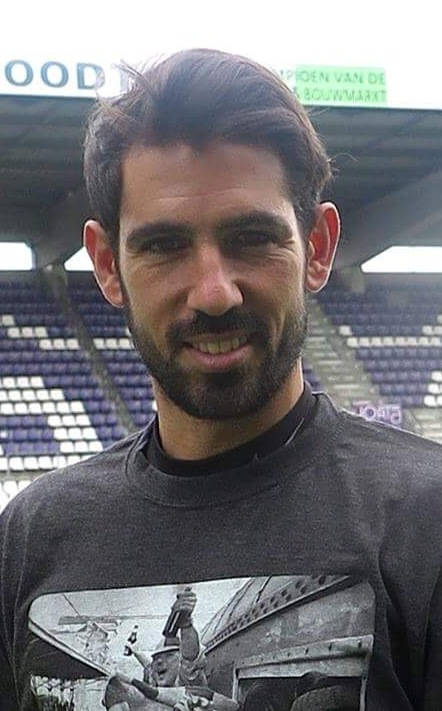
Hernan Losada

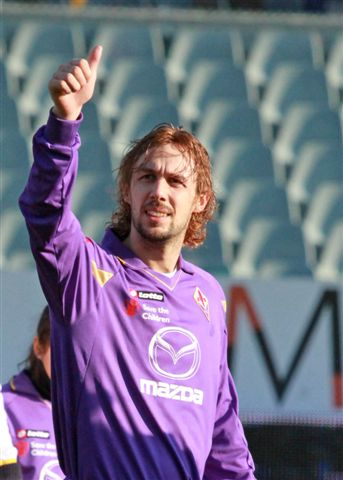
Marco Donadel

Information correct as of November 16, 2025

Key

- Names of interim managers are highlighted in italics and marked with an asterisk (*).
- Match results contain all league games as well as MLS playoff matches.

List of CF Montréal managers
Name	Nationality	From	To	Matches	Won	Lost	Drawn (Note: Before the 2000 Major League Soccer season, matches would be settled in a penalty shootout rather than end in a draw.)	Win%	Honors
Jesse Marsch	United States	August 10, 2011	November 3, 2012	34	12	16	6	35.29	
Marco Schällibaum	Switzerland	January 8, 2013	December 18, 2013	35	14	14	7	40.00	Canadian Championship winner: 2013
Frank Klopas	United States	December 18, 2013	August 24, 2015	57	14	29	14	24.56	Canadian Championship winner: 2014, runners-up: 2015, CONCACAF Champions League runners-up: 2014-15
Mauro Biello	Canada	August 24, 2015 (Note: Biello was appointed as interim manager on August 24, 2015. On November 13, 2015 he was elevated to the full-time role.)	October 23, 2017	92	35	35	22	38.04	Canadian Championship winners: 2017
Rémi Garde	France	November 8, 2017	August 21, 2019	61	24	29	8	39.34	
Wílmer Cabrera	Colombia	August 21, 2019	October 24, 2019	7	2	4	1	28.57	Canadian Championship winners: 2019
Thierry Henry	France	November 14, 2019	February 25, 2021	24	8	14	2	33.33	
Wilfried Nancy	France	March 8, 2021	December 6, 2022	70	33	22	15	47.14	Canadian Championship winners: 2021
Hernán Losada	Argentina	December 22, 2022	November 9, 2023	34	12	17	5	35.29	Canadian Championship runners-up: 2023
Laurent Courtois	France	January 8, 2024	March 24, 2025	40	11	17	12	27.50	
Marco Donadel	Italy	March 24, 2025 (Note: On March 24, 2025, Donadel was named interim manager. On 21 October 2025, he was named as full time head coach.)	12 April 2026	29	6	17	6	20.69	

== See also ==
- List of Major League Soccer head coaches
