= 2025 Columbus Crew season =

American professional soccer team

Columbus Crew
2025 season
- Investor-operators: Dee Haslam; Jimmy Haslam; JW Johnson; Whitney Johnson; Dr. Pete Edwards
- Head coach: Wilfried Nancy
- Stadium: Lower.com Field
- Major League Soccer: Conference: 7th Overall: 12th
- MLS Cup playoffs: Round one
- Leagues Cup: League phase
- CONCACAF Champions Cup: Round of 16
- Top goalscorer: League: Diego Rossi (16); All: Diego Rossi (19)
- Average home league attendance: 22,795
Home colors	Away colors	Third colors

The 2025 Columbus Crew season was the club's 30th season of existence and their 30th consecutive season in Major League Soccer, the top flight of soccer in the United States and Canada. The first match of the season was on February 22 against Chicago Fire FC. It was their third and final season under head coach Wilfried Nancy. The club revealed a logo to commemorate their 30th season.

== Roster ==
As of July 26, 2025

Note: Flags indicate national team as defined under FIFA eligibility rules; some limited exceptions apply. Players may hold more than one non-FIFA nationality.

No.	Pos.	Nation	Player
1	GK	GUA	Nicholas Hagen (SUP)
2	DF	ARG	Andrés Herrera (on loan River Plate) (INT)
4	DF	FRA	Rudy Camacho (INT)
6	MF	USA	Darlington Nagbe (captain; DP)
7	MF	FRA	Dylan Chambost (INT)
8	MF	HUN	Dániel Gazdag (DP)
9	FW	PLE	Wessam Abou Ali (DP)
10	FW	URU	Diego Rossi (DP)
11	MF	NGR	Ibrahim Aliyu (U22)
14	MF	GER	Amar Sejdić
16	FW	USA	Taha Habroune (HGP; SUP)
18	DF	DEN	Malte Amundsen
19	FW	CAN	Jacen Russell-Rowe (HGP; SUP)
20	MF	USA	Derrick Jones

No.	Pos.	Nation	Player
21	DF	UKR	Yevhen Cheberko (INT)
22	GK	MEX	Abraham Romero (SUP)
23	DF	ALG	Mohamed Farsi (INT)
24	GK	USA	Evan Bush (SUP)
25	DF	USA	Sean Zawadzki
26	MF	FIN	Lassi Lappalainen (INT)
27	DF	USA	Maximilian Arfsten
28	GK	USA	Patrick Schulte
29	MF	USA	Cole Mrowka (HGP; SUP)
30	MF	FRA	Hugo Picard
31	DF	CPV	Steven Moreira (INT)
41	GK	BLR	Stanislav Lapkes (HGP; SUP)
44	MF	USA	Tristan Brown (HG)
48	DF	USA	Cesar Ruvalcaba (SUP)

== Technical Staff ==
Position	Staff
General Manager	(France) Issa Tall
Head Coach	(France) Wilfried Nancy
Assistant Coach	(Republic of Ireland) Kwame Ampadu
Assistant Coach	(France) Yoann Damet
Goalkeeper Coach	(United States) Phil Boerger
Assistant Coach and Fitness Coach	(Canada) Jules Gueguen
Video Performance Coach	(France) Maxime Chalier
Technical Director	(United States) Marc Nicholls
Vice President, Soccer Administration & Operations	(United States) Jaime McMillan
Director of Analytics	(United States) Alex Mysiw
Senior Manager, Soccer Systems	(United States) Dustin Kadri
Director, Player Personnel	(United States) George Gallagher
Technical Scouting Manager	(United States) Marshall Bushnell
Director, Soccer Administration	(United States) Kathy Scheiferstein
Manager of Equipment Operations	(United States) David Brauzer
Assistant Equipment Manager	(United States) Derrick Contreras
Director of Soccer Operations	(United States) Julio Velasquez
Manager, Player Care & Team Operations	(United States) Elena Lemus
Head of Sport Science & Medicine	(United States) Chris Shenberger
Head Athletic Trainer	(United States) Chris Rumsey
Assistant Athletic Trainer	(United States) Daniel Givens
Assistant Athletic Trainer	(United States) Catherine Hill
Mental Performance Coach	(United States) Elle Nelson
Sports Scientist	(Australia) Callum McCaskie
Performance Coach, End Stage Rehabilitation & Injury Prevention	(United States) Ahmad Salamah
Strength and Conditioning Coach	(United States) Luis Jeronimo
Sports Dietitian	(United States) Kyla Cross

Source: []

== Non-competitive ==
=== Preseason ===
February 1 Friendly	Columbus Crew	v	Pittsburgh Riverhounds SC	Columbus, OH
11:30 a.m. EST		Report		Stadium: OhioHealth Performance Center at Historic Crew Stadium; Attendance: Closed door

February 8 Friendly	Columbus Crew	v	Nashville SC	Palm Beach Gardens, FL
2:30 p.m. EST		Report		Attendance: Closed door

February 12 Friendly	Columbus Crew	v	Houston Dynamo FC	Palm Beach Gardens, FL
6:00 p.m. EST		Report		Attendance: Closed door

February 15 Friendly	Columbus Crew	v	Toronto FC	Palm Beach Gardens, FL
11:30 a.m. EST				Attendance: Closed door

== Competitions ==
=== Overview ===
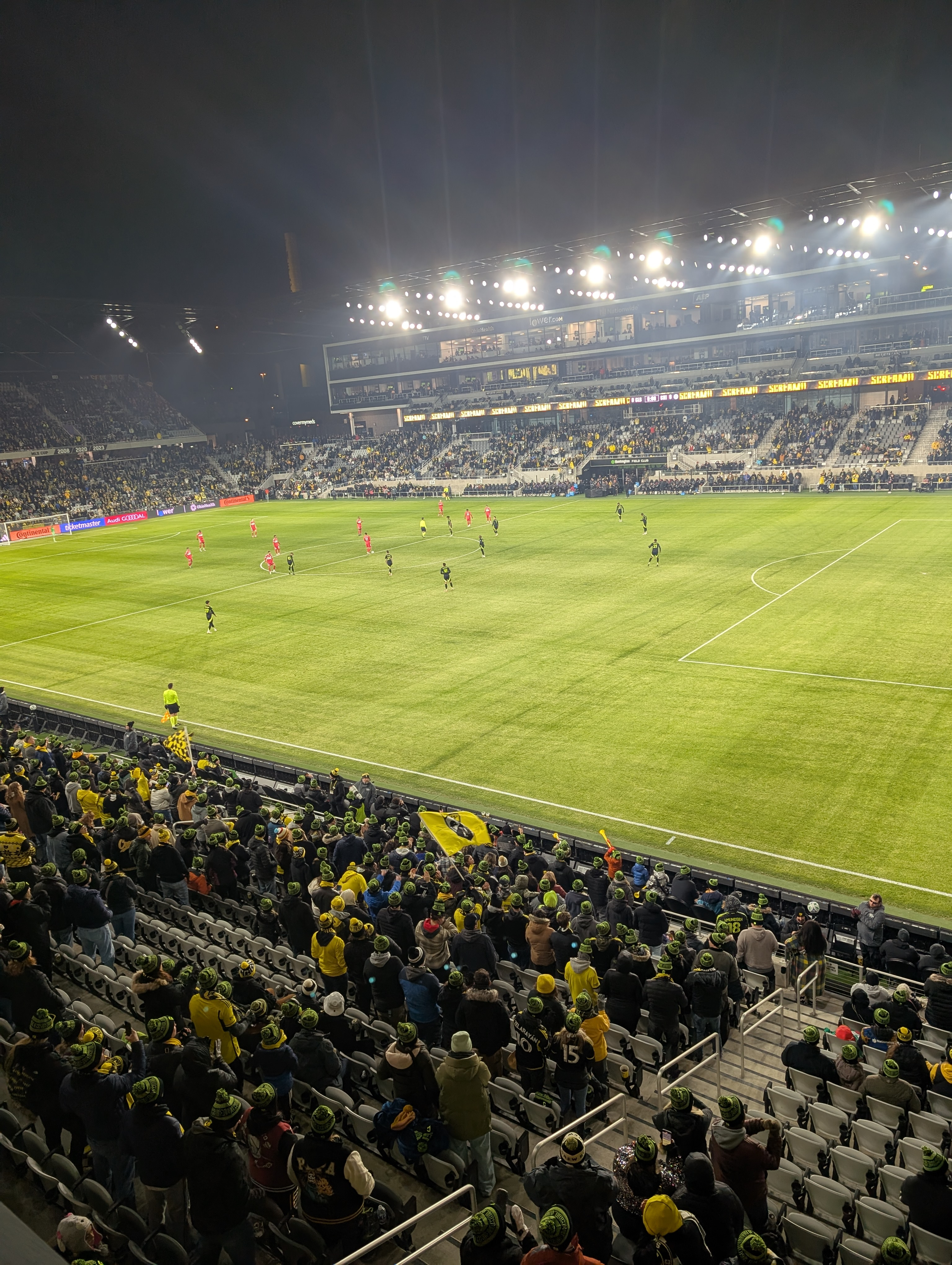
The Crew playing against Chicago Fire FC on February 22, 2025

Competition	First match	Last match	Starting round	Final position	Record							
Competition	First match	Last match	Starting round	Final position	Pld	W	D	L	GF	GA	GD	Win %
Major League Soccer	February 22, 2025	October 18, 2025	Matchday 1	TBD	26	12	9	5	42	37	+5	46.15
MLS Cup playoffs	TBD	TBD	TBD	TBD	0	0	0	0	0	0	+0	—
Leagues Cup	July 29, 2025	August 5, 2025	League Phase	League Phase	3	2	1	0	6	3	+3	66.67
CONCACAF Champions Cup	March 4, 2025	March 11, 2025	Round of 16	Round of 16	2	1	0	1	2	4	−2	50.00
Total					31	15	10	6	50	44	+6	48.39

Source: Competitions

=== Major League Soccer (MLS) ===
==== Standings ====
===== Eastern Conference =====
MLS Eastern Conference table (2025)
Pos	Team	Pld	W	L	T	GF	GA	GD	Pts	Qualification
5	New York City FC	34	17	12	5	50	44	+6	56	Qualification for round one
6	Nashville SC	34	16	12	6	58	45	+13	54	Qualification for round one
7	Columbus Crew	34	14	8	12	55	51	+4	54	Qualification for round one
8	Chicago Fire FC	34	15	11	8	68	60	+8	53	Qualification for the wild-card round
9	Orlando City SC	34	14	9	11	63	51	+12	53	Qualification for the wild-card round

Source: MLS
Rules for classification: 1) points; 2) total wins; 3) total goal differential; 4) total goals scored; 5) fewer disciplinary points; 6) away goal differential; 7) away goals scored; 8) home goals differential; 9) home goals scored; 10) coin toss (2 clubs tied) or drawing of lots (≥3 clubs tied)

===== Overall table =====
Overall MLS standings table (2025)
Pos	Team	Pld	W	L	T	GF	GA	GD	Pts	Qualification
10	Seattle Sounders FC (L)	34	15	9	10	58	48	+10	55	Qualification for the CONCACAF Champions Cup Round of 16 (Note: As winners of Leagues Cup)
11	Nashville SC (U)	34	16	12	6	58	45	+13	54	Qualification for the CONCACAF Champions Cup Round one (Note: As winners of 2025 U.S. Open Cup)
12	Columbus Crew	34	14	8	12	55	51	+4	54	
13	Chicago Fire FC	34	15	11	8	68	60	+8	53	
14	Orlando City SC	34	14	9	11	63	51	+12	53	

Source: MLS
Rules for classification: 1) points; 2) total wins; 3) total goal differential; 4) total goals scored; 5) fewer disciplinary points; 6) away goal differential; 7) away goals scored; 8) home goals differential; 9) home goals scored; 10) coin toss (2 clubs tied) or drawing of lots (≥3 clubs tied)
(L) Leagues Cup winners; (U) U.S. Open Cup winners

==== Results summary ====
Overall								Home						Away					
Pld	Pts	W	L	T	GF	GA	GD	W	L	T	GF	GA	GD	W	L	T	GF	GA	GD
34	54	14	8	12	55	52	+3	9	3	5	29	20	+9	5	5	7	26	32	−6

Last updated: October 18, 2025
Source: MLS Results
Pld = Matches played; Pts = Points; W = Matches won; T = Matches tied; L = Matches lost; GF = Goals for; GA = Goals against; GD = Goal difference

==== Results by round ====
Round	1	2	3	4	5	6	7	8	9	10	11	12	13	14	15	16	17	18	19	20	21	22	23	24	25	26	27	28	29	30	31	32	33	34
Stadium	H	A	H	A	H	A	H	A	H	H	H	A	A	H	A	H	A	H	H	H	A	A	A	H	H	A	H	A	A	A	H	A	A	H
Result	W	W	D	D	D	W	W	W	L	W	W	D	D	D	L	D	L	W	W	W	D	W	L	W	L	D	L	D	W	L	D	L	D	W

Updated to match(es) played on October 4, 2025. Source: Match reports
Columbus schedule
A = Away; H = Home; N = Neutral; W = Win; D = Draw; L = Loss

==== Match results ====
Win Draw Loss

February 22 1	Columbus Crew	4–2	Chicago Fire FC	Columbus, OH
7:30 PM EST	Russell-Rowe 19'; Terán 37' (o.g.); Rossi 45+1', 50'	Report	Gutiérrez 13', 22', (yellow card) 59'; Oregel (yellow card) 37'; Zinckernagel (yellow card) 44'	Stadium: Lower.com Field; Attendance: 20,210; Referee: Fotis Bazakos; Assistant referees: Andrew Bigelow; Jeffrey Swartzel; Fourth official: Calin Radosav

March 1 2	New England Revolution	0–1	Columbus Crew	Foxborough, MA
7:30 PM EST	Feingold (yellow card) 10'; Ganago (yellow card) 45+2'	Report	Russell-Rowe 51'; Arfsten (yellow card) 78'; Amundsen (yellow card) 87'; Zawadzki (yellow card) 90+5'	Stadium: Gillette Stadium; Attendance: 22,274; Referee: Filip Dujic; Assistant referees: Ian McKay; Ben Pilgrim; Fourth official: Pierre-Luc Lauziere

March 8 3	Columbus Crew	0–0	Houston Dynamo FC	Columbus, OH
2:30 PM EST	Farsi (yellow card) 29'; Arfsten (yellow card) 57'	Report	Awodesu (yellow card) 9'; Ponce (yellow card) 21'; Dueñas (yellow card) 65'; Artur (yellow card) 73'	Stadium: Lower.com Field; Attendance: 20,231; Referee: Jon Freemon; Assistant referees: Kyle Atkins; Corey Parker; Fourth official: Lukasz Szpala

March 15 4	San Diego FC	1–1	Columbus Crew	San Diego, CA
10:30 PM EDT	Ángel (yellow card) 31'; Valakari 69'	Report	Arfsten 13', (red card) 61'; Zawadzki (yellow card) 33'; Chambost (yellow card) 90+1'; Rossi (yellow card) 90+5'; Schulte (yellow card) 90+9'	Stadium: Snapdragon Stadium; Attendance: 30,018; Referee: Victor Rivas; Assistant referees: Cameron Blanchard; Jeremy Hanson; Fourth official: Ricardo Fierro

March 22 5	Columbus Crew	0–0	New York City FC	Columbus, OH
7:30 PM EDT		Report		Stadium: Lower.com Field; Attendance: 20,235; Referee: Rubiel Vazquez; Assistant referees: Jason White; Stephan McGonagle; Fourth official: Nabil Bensalah

March 29 6	D.C. United	1–2	Columbus Crew	Washington, D.C.
7:30 PM EDT	Benteke 13'; Bartlett (yellow card) 31'; Schnegg (yellow card) 34'; Dodson (yellow card) 71'; Peglow (yellow card) 77'	Report	Russell-Rowe (yellow card) 35'; Rossi 16', 65'	Stadium: Audi Field; Attendance: 17,048; Referee: Chris Penso; Assistant referees: Nick Uranga; Cory Richardson; Fourth official: Natalie Simon

April 5 7	Columbus Crew	2–1	CF Montréal	Columbus, OH
7:30 PM EDT	Jackson 11'; Russell-Rowe 26'; Zawadzki (yellow card) 36'	Report	Guboglo (yellow card) 17'; Waterman (yellow card) 30'; Owusu 50'; Clark (yellow card) 66'; Petrasso (yellow card) 89'; Piette (yellow card) 90+4'	Stadium: Lower.com Field; Attendance: 19,671; Referee: Alexis Da Silva; Assistant referees: Logan Brown; Oscar Mitchell-Carvalho; Fourth official: Nabil Bensalah

April 13 8	St. Louis City SC	1–2	Columbus Crew	St. Louis, MO
7:00 PM EDT	Klauss 7'; Pompeu (yellow card) 39'; Kessler (yellow card) 90+5'	Report	Moreira 45+2'; Rossi 55'; Arfsten (yellow card) 76'	Stadium: Energizer Park; Attendance: 22,423; Referee: Rosendo Mendoza; Assistant referees: Kyle Atkins; Matthew Rodman; Fourth official: Fotis Bazakos

April 19 9	Columbus Crew	0–1	Inter Miami CF	Cleveland, OH
4:30 PM EDT		Report	Cremaschi 30'; Falcón (yellow card) 82'; Luján (yellow card) 87'	Stadium: Huntington Bank Field; Attendance: 60,614; Referee: Tori Penso; Assistant referees: Kathryn Nesbitt; Ryan Graves; Fourth official: Alexis Da Silva
Note: The Columbus Crew moved this home match to Cleveland due to the anticipated demand.

April 26 10	Columbus Crew	2–1	San Jose Earthquakes	Columbus, OH
7:30 PM EDT	Zawadzki 29'; Arfsten 62'; Moreira (yellow card) 84'; Schulte (yellow card) 86'	Report	Martínez 40'	Stadium: Lower.com Field; Attendance: 20,737; Referee: Guido Gonzales Jr. Assistant referees: Jeffrey Greeson; Justin Howard; Fourth official: Calin Radosav

May 3 11	Columbus Crew	4–2	Charlotte FC	Columbus, OH
7:30 PM EDT	Zawadzki (yellow card) 14'; Chambost 25'; Rossi 39' (pen.); Russell-Rowe (yellow card) 45+8', (goal) 81'; Jackson 51'	Report	Zaha 45+2' (pen.); Abada 64'	Stadium: Lower.com Field; Attendance: 20,167; Referee: Allen Chapman; Assistant referees: Andrew Bigelow; John Krill; Fourth official: Joshua Encarnacion

May 10 12	Philadelphia Union	2–2	Columbus Crew	Chester, PA
7:30 PM EDT	Baribo 45'; Westfield 64'	Report	Cheberko (yellow card) 55'; Arfsten 61'; Amundsen (yellow card) 84'; Zawadzki 90+3'	Stadium: Subaru Park; Attendance: 18,667; Referee: Malik Badawi; Assistant referees: Jose Da Silva; Eric Weisbrod; Fourth official: John Matto

May 14 13	CF Montréal	1–1	Columbus Crew	Montreal, QC
7:30 PM EDT	Petrasso 29'; Waterman (yellow card) 86'	Report	Russell-Rowe 63'	Stadium: Saputo Stadium; Attendance: 16,041; Referee: Allen Chapman; Assistant referees: Stefan Tanaka-Freundt; Walt Heatherly; Fourth official: Scott Bowman

May 17 14	Columbus Crew	1–1	FC Cincinnati	Columbus, OH
7:00 PM EDT	Rossi 54' (pen.)	Report	Denkey 6'; Bucha (yellow card) 20'	Stadium: Lower.com Field; Attendance: 20,363; Referee: Rubiel Vazquez; Assistant referees: Cameron Blanchard; Ian McKay; Fourth official: Benjamin Meyer

May 24 15	Charlotte FC	3–2	Columbus Crew	Charlotte, NC
7:30 PM EDT	Agyemang 19', 24'; Westwood (yellow card) 26'; Biel 75'; Bronico (yellow card) 90+2'	Report	Aliyu 15'; Amundsen 65'	Stadium: Bank of America Stadium; Attendance: 29,755; Referee: Lukasz Szpala; Assistant referees: Cory Richardson; Nick Uranga; Fourth official: Corbyn May

May 28 16	Columbus Crew	2–2	Nashville SC	Columbus, OH
8:00 PM EDT	Nagbe (yellow card) 66'; Rossi 69'; Palacios 81' (o.g.); Chambost (yellow card) 90+3'	Report	Surridge 2'; Pérez (yellow card) 54'; Mukhtar 78', (yellow card) 87'; Muyl (yellow card) 90+3'	Stadium: Lower.com Field; Attendance: 20,022; Referee: Victor Rivas; Assistant referees: Jason White; Tyler Wyrostek; Fourth official: Sergii Boiko

May 31 17	Inter Miami CF	5–1	Columbus Crew	Fort Lauderdale, FL
7:30 PM EDT	Allende 13'; Messi 15', 24'; Martínez (yellow card) 57'; Suárez 64'; Picault 89'	Report	Ruvalcaba 58', (yellow card) 62'	Stadium: Chase Stadium; Attendance: 20,861; Referee: Rosendo Mendoza; Assistant referees: Jeffrey Greeson; Kevin Lock; Fourth official: Elvis Osmanovic

June 14 18	Columbus Crew	2–1	Vancouver Whitecaps FC	Columbus, OH
7:30 PM EDT	Aliyu 2'; Rossi 23'; Gazdag (yellow card) 85'	Report	Ngando 6'; Blackmon (yellow card) 32'	Stadium: Lower.com Field; Attendance: 20,721; Referee: Guido Gonzales Jr. Assistant referees: Jose Da Silva; Mike Nickerson; Fourth official: Greg Dopka

June 25 19	Columbus Crew	3–1	Atlanta United FC	Columbus, OH
7:30 PM EDT	Herrera 23', (yellow card) 50'; Russell-Rowe 32', 42'	Report	Latte Lath (yellow card) 45+1'; Lennon 56'; Reilly (yellow card) 73'; Morales (yellow card) 81'; Slisz (yellow card) 88'	Stadium: Lower.com Field; Attendance: 20,420; Referee: Victor Rivas; Assistant referees: Chris Elliott; Nicholas Balcer; Fourth official: Muhammad Hassan

June 29 20	Columbus Crew	1–0	Philadelphia Union	Columbus, OH
6:00 PM EDT	Farsi 45+2'; Gazdag (yellow card) 50'; Habroune (yellow card) 90+1'	Report	Bedoya (yellow card) 1'; Bueno (yellow card) 32'; Lukić (yellow card) 35'; Wagner (yellow card) 65'; Olivas (yellow card) 79'; Jean Jacques (yellow card) 88'	Stadium: Lower.com Field; Attendance: 20,559; Referee: Filip Dujic; Assistant referees: Jeremy Hanson; Jason White; Fourth official: Atahan Yaya

July 6 21	Seattle Sounders FC	1–1	Columbus Crew	Seattle, WA
5:00 PM EDT	Rothrock 43'; Ragen (yellow card) 46'; C. Roldan (yellow card) 71'; Kossa-Rienzi (yellow card) 87' (red card) 90+2'	Report	Rossi 27', (yellow card) 90+6'; Farsi (yellow card) 78'; Moreira (yellow card) 85'	Stadium: Lumen Field; Attendance: 30,552; Referee: Ismir Pekmic; Assistant referees: Jeremy Kieso; Stefan Tanaka-Freundt; Fourth official: Adorae Monroy

July 12 22	FC Cincinnati	2–4	Columbus Crew	Cincinnati, OH
7:30 PM EDT	Bucha 1', (yellow card) 45'; Evander 5', (yellow card) 45+5'; Anunga (yellow card) 18'; Robinson (yellow card) 86'	Report	Rossi 42'; Arfsten 45+3'; Chambost (yellow card) 53'; Robinson 59' (o.g.); Gazdag (yellow card) 68'; Russell-Rowe (yellow card) 78'; Habroune 90+3', (yellow card) 90+5'	Stadium: TQL Stadium; Attendance: 25,513; Referee: Alexis Da Silva; Assistant referees: Cory Richardson; Ryan Graves; Fourth official: Jeremy Scheer

July 16 23	Nashville SC	3–0	Columbus Crew	Nashville, TN
8:30 PM EDT	Zawadzki 2' (o.g.); Mukhtar 30'; Pérez (yellow card) 49'; Surridge 82'	Report	Arfsten (yellow card) 57'; Gazdag (yellow card) 82'	Stadium: Geodis Park; Attendance: 28,254; Referee: Ricardo Montero; Assistant referees: Corey Parker; Kyle Atkins; Fourth official: Rosendo Mendoza

July 19 24	Columbus Crew	2–1	D.C. United	Columbus, OH
7:30 PM EDT	Gazdag 31' (pen.); Moreira (yellow card) 38'; Lappalainen 78'	Report	Benteke 48'; Herrera (yellow card) 84' (yellow-red card) 89'	Stadium: Lower.com Field; Attendance: 20,668; Referee: Ekaterina Koroleva; Assistant referees: Andrew Bigelow; Walt Heatherly; Fourth official: Jair Marrufo

July 25 25	Columbus Crew	1–3	Orlando City SC	Columbus, OH
7:30 PM EDT	Rossi 66' (pen.); Zawadzki (yellow card) 82'	Report	Enrique 76', 79'; Jansson (yellow card) 78'; Ojeda 90+6'	Stadium: Lower.com Field; Attendance: 20,641; Referee: Timothy Ford; Assistant referees: Lyes Arfa; Jeffrey Swartzel; Fourth official: Joshua Encarnación

August 16 27	Toronto FC	1–1	Columbus Crew	Toronto, ON
7:30 PM EDT	Vilsaint 77'	Report	Rossi 8' (yellow card) 68'	Stadium: BMO Field; Attendance: 23,452; Referee: Chris Penso; Assistant referees: Andrew Bigelow; Gianni Facchini; Fourth official: Renzo Villanueva

August 23 28	Columbus Crew	1–2	New England Revolution	Columbus, OH
7:30 PM EDT	Gazdag 71'; Moreira (yellow card) 84'	Report	Campana 25'; Polster (yellow card) 45+2'; Gil (yellow card) 47'; Ganago 39'	Stadium: Lower.com Field; Attendance: 20,777; Referee: Sergii Demianchuk; Assistant referees: Logan Brown; Jason White; Fourth official: Muhammad Hassan

August 30 29	New York Red Bulls	0–0	Columbus Crew	Harrison, NJ
7:30 PM EDT	Sofo (yellow card) 69'	Report	Chambost (yellow card) 30'; Picard (yellow card) 79'	Stadium: Sports Illustrated Stadium; Attendance: 18,913; Referee: Rubiel Vazquez; Assistant referees: Jose Da Silva; Matthew Nelson; Fourth official: Brad Jensen

September 13 30	Atlanta United FC	4–5	Columbus Crew	Atlanta, GA
7:30 PM EDT	Almirón 45+3' (pen.); Amador 46'; Thiaré 50', 88'; Alzate (yellow card) 75'	Report	Rossi 14', 16', 39'; Abou Ali 25'; Herrera 39'; Cheberko (yellow card) 45+2'; Schulte (yellow card) 90+6'	Stadium: Mercedes-Benz Stadium; Attendance: 41,089; Referee: Jon Freemon; Assistant referees: Kyle Atkins, Tyler Wyrostek; Fourth official: Timothy Ford

September 17 26	New York City FC	3–2	Columbus Crew	New York, NY
7:30 PM EDT	Wolf 45+3', 73'; Fernández 90+4', (yellow card) 90+5'	Report	Gazdag 40' (pen.); Abou Ali 60'	Stadium: Yankee Stadium; Attendance: 17,413; Referee: Sergii Boiko; Assistant referees: Mike Nickerson, Eric Weisbrod; Fourth official: Ricardo Montero
Note: Match originally scheduled for August 9 at Citi Field rescheduled and moved to Yankee Stadium due to field maintenance at the former.

September 20 31	Columbus Crew	1–1	Toronto FC	Columbus, OH
7:30 PM EDT	Abou Ali 16'; Gazdag (yellow card) 42'; Aliyu (yellow card) 90+8'	Report	Coello (yellow card) 34'; Laryea 51'	Stadium: Lower.com Field; Attendance: 20,739; Referee: Elijio Arreguin; Assistant referees: Corey Parker; Lyes Arfa; Fourth official: Guido Gonzales Jr.

September 27 32	Chicago Fire FC	2–0	Columbus Crew	Chicago, IL
8:30 PM EDT	Gutman 25'; Cuypers 70'; Rogers (yellow card) 90+4'	Report	Aliyu (yellow card) 66'	Stadium: Soldier Field; Attendance: 23,321; Referee: Tori Penso; Assistant referees: Brooke Mayo; Stefan Tanaka-Freundt; Fourth official: Calin Radosav

October 4 33	Orlando City SC	1–1	Columbus Crew	Orlando, FL
7:30 PM EDT	Pašalić 34'; Freeman (yellow card) 63'; Rodríguez (yellow card) 90+2'	Report	Amundsen (yellow card) 24'; Herrera 32'	Stadium: Inter&Co Stadium; Attendance: 21,006; Referee: Victor Rivas; Assistant referees: Ryan Graves; Diego Blas; Fourth official: John Matto

October 18 34	Columbus Crew	3–1	New York Red Bulls	Columbus, OH
6:00 PM EDT	Herrera 16'; Gazdag 66'; Aliyu 84'		Choupo-Moting 11'; Edelman (yellow card) 15'; Nealis (yellow card) 70'	Stadium: Lower.com Field; Referee: Marcos de Oliveira; Assistant referees: Cory Richardson, Jeffrey Swartzel; Fourth official: Ricardo Montero

=== MLS Cup Playoffs ===
==== Round One ====
October 27 Round One	FC Cincinnati	1–0	Columbus Crew	Cincinnati, Ohio
6:45 pm EDT	Evander (yellow card) 29'; Kubo (yellow card) 55'; Denkey 78'; Bucha (yellow card) 90+3'	Report	Arfsten (yellow card) 19'	Stadium: TQL Stadium; Attendance: 23,371; Referee: Rubiel Vazquez

November 2 Round One	Columbus Crew	4–0	FC Cincinnati	Columbus, Ohio
6:30 pm EST	Arfsten 33'; Chambost 41'; Herrera 65'; Russell-Rowe 69'	Report	Kubo (yellow card) 7' (red card) 38'; Robinson (yellow card) 30'; Evander (yellow card) 74'	Stadium: Lower.com Field; Attendance: 19,506; Referee: Guido Gonzales Jr.

November 8 Round One	FC Cincinnati	2–1	Columbus Crew	Cincinnati, Ohio
6:00 pm EDT	Hagglund (yellow card) 10'; Brenner 67', 86', (yellow card) 87'	Report	Amundsen (yellow card) 4'; Habroune (yellow card) 35'; Russell-Rowe 63'	Stadium: TQL Stadium; Attendance: 25,513; Referee: Chris Penso
Note: FC Cincinnati won the series 2–1.

=== U.S. Open Cup ===
Columbus Crew did not send their senior squad to the U.S. Open Cup as they were already participating in the 2025 CONCACAF Champions Cup and the 2025 Leagues Cup and sent Columbus Crew 2 instead.

=== Leagues Cup ===
July 29 Phase One	Toluca (Mexico)	2–2 (4–2 p)	(United States) Columbus Crew	Columbus, OH
7:00 PM EDT	Gallardo (yellow card) 16'; Angulo (yellow card) 37'; Ruiz (yellow card) 63'; Vega (yellow card) 63'; Paulinho 71', 80'; Pereira (yellow card) 87'	Report	Rossi 11' (pen.); Zawadzki (yellow card) 43'; Russell-Rowe (yellow card) 45+4'; Arfsten 48'	Stadium: Lower.com Field; Attendance: 10,916; Referee: Oshane Nation; Assistant referees: Caleb Wales; Ojay Duhaney; Fourth official: Reon Raddix
	Penalties
	Vega (penalty scored); García (penalty scored); Méndez (penalty missed); Gallardo (penalty scored); Helinho (penalty scored)		(penalty missed) Rossi; (penalty missed) Sejdić; (penalty scored) Habroune; (penalty scored) Lappalainen

August 1 Phase One	Columbus Crew (United States)	3–1	(Mexico) Puebla	Columbus, OH
7:00 PM EDT	Amundsen 14'; Rossi 16'; Herrera 39'; Zawadzki (yellow card) 90+2'	Report	Gamarra (yellow card) 43'; Fedorco (yellow card) 44'; Lozano 45+1'; Moreno (yellow card) 61'	Stadium: Lower.com Field; Attendance: 20,211; Referee: Filip Dujic; Assistant referees: Gerard-Kader Lebuis; Stefan Tanaka-Freundt; Fourth official: Pierre-Luc Lauziere

August 5 Phase One	Columbus Crew (United States)	1–0	(Mexico) León	Columbus, OH
7:30 PM EDT	Arfsten 53'; Herrera (yellow card) 61'; Moreira (yellow card) 90+7'	Report	Barreiro (yellow card) 2'; Reyes (yellow card) 35'; Jiménez (yellow card) 62'; Frías (yellow card) 64'; Echeverría (yellow card) 90+7'	Stadium: Lower.com Field; Attendance: 13,465; Referee: Selvin Brown; Assistant referees: Gerson Orellana; Roney Salinas; Fourth official: Jefferson Escobar

=== CONCACAF Champions Cup ===
==== Round of 16 ====
March 4 Leg 1	Los Angeles FC (United States)	3–0	(United States) Columbus Crew	Los Angeles, CA
10:30 PM EST	Bouanga 20', 46'; Jesus (yellow card) 21'; Ordaz 81'	Report	Herrera (yellow card) 90'	Stadium: BMO Stadium; Attendance: 7,285; Referee: César Arturo Ramos (Mexico); Assistant referees: Alberto Morín (Mexico); Marco Antonio Bisguerra (Mexico); Fourth official: Daniel Quintero

March 11 Leg 2	Columbus Crew (United States)	2–1 (2–4 agg.)	(United States) Los Angeles FC	Columbus, OH
8:30 PM EST	Russell-Rowe 10'; Rossi 45' (pen.)	Report	Bouanga (yellow card) 45', (goal) 90+6'; Delgado (yellow card) 90+3'; Giroud (yellow card) 90+3'	Stadium: Lower.com Field; Attendance: 6,205; Referee: Iván Barton (El Salvador); Assistant referees: David Jonathan Morán (El Salvador); Henri Antonio Pupiro (El Salvador); Fourth official: Filiberto Enrique Martínez (El Salvador)
Note: Los Angeles FC advance 4–2

== Statistics ==
=== Appearances and goals ===
Under "Apps" for each section, the first number represents the number of starts, and the second number represents appearances as a substitute.

No.	Pos	Nat	Player	Total		MLS		MLS Cup Playoffs		CONCACAF Champions Cup		Leagues Cup	
No.	Pos	Nat	Player	Apps	Goals	Apps	Goals	Apps	Goals	Apps	Goals	Apps	Goals
1	GK	(Guatemala) GUA	Nicholas Hagen	0	0	0+0	0	0+0	0	0+0	0	0+0	0
2	DF	(Argentina) ARG	Andrés Herrera	6	0	3+3	0	0+0	0	0+0	0	0+0	0
4	DF	(France) FRA	Rudy Camacho	2	0	0+0	0	0+0	0	1+1	0	0+0	0
6	MF	(United States) USA	Darlington Nagbe	15	0	13+0	0	0+0	0	2+0	0	0+0	0
7	MF	(France) FRA	Dylan Chambost	16	1	14+0	1	0+0	0	2+0	0	0+0	0
8	FW	(Hungary) HUN	Dániel Gazdag	6	0	5+1	0	0+0	0	0+0	0	0+0	0
10	FW	(Uruguay) URU	Diego Rossi	15	8	13+0	7	0+0	0	2+0	1	0+0	0
11	MF	(Nigeria) NGR	Ibrahim Aliyu	4	0	1+3	0	0+0	0	0+0	0	0+0	0
13	MF	(United States) USA	Aziel Jackson	15	2	6+7	2	0+0	0	2+0	0	0+0	0
14	MF	(Germany) GER	Amar Sejdić	4	0	0+4	0	0+0	0	0+0	0	0+0	0
16	MF	(United States) USA	Taha Habroune	7	0	0+5	0	0+0	0	0+2	0	0+0	0
18	DF	(Denmark) DEN	Malte Amundsen	14	0	10+2	0	0+0	0	2+0	0	0+0	0
19	FW	(Canada) CAN	Jacen Russell-Rowe	16	6	12+2	5	0+0	0	1+1	1	0+0	0
20	MF	(United States) USA	Derrick Jones	1	0	0+1	0	0+0	0	0+0	0	0+0	0
21	DF	(Ukraine) UKR	Yevhen Cheberko	13	0	10+1	0	0+0	0	1+1	0	0+0	0
22	GK	(Mexico) MEX	Abraham Romero	0	0	0+0	0	0+0	0	0+0	0	0+0	0
23	DF	(Algeria) ALG	Mohamed Farsi	14	0	12+0	0	0+0	0	1+1	0	0+0	0
24	GK	(United States) USA	Evan Bush	1	0	1+0	0	0+0	0	0+0	0	0+0	0
25	DF	(United States) USA	Sean Zawadzki	15	2	13+0	2	0+0	0	2+0	0	0+0	0
26	MF	(Finland) FIN	Lassi Lappalainen	2	0	0+2	0	0+0	0	0+0	0	0+0	0
27	DF	(United States) USA	Maximilian Arfsten	15	3	13+0	3	0+0	0	1+1	0	0+0	0
28	GK	(United States) USA	Patrick Schulte	15	0	13+0	0	0+0	0	2+0	0	0+0	0
29	MF	(United States) USA	Cole Mrowka	2	0	0+1	0	0+0	0	0+1	0	0+0	0
31	DF	(Cape Verde) CPV	Steven Moreira	13	1	10+1	1	0+0	0	2+0	0	0+0	0
41	GK	(Belarus) BLR	Stanislav Lapkes	0	0	0+0	0	0+0	0	0+0	0	0+0	0
48	DF	(United States) USA	Cesar Ruvalcaba	5	0	2+3	0	0+0	0	0+0	0	0+0	0
			Own goal	0	1	-	1	-	0	-	0	-	0
Players who left Columbus during the season:
12	DF	(United States) USA	DeJuan Jones	7	0	3+2	0	0+0	0	1+1	0	0+0	0
44	MF	(United States) USA	Tristan Brown	2	0	0+2	0	0+0	0	0+0	0	0+0	0
45	MF	(United States) USA	Owen Presthus	0	0	0+0	0	0+0	0	0+0	0	0+0	0
46	FW	(United States) USA	Chase Adams	0	0	0+0	0	0+0	0	0+0	0	0+0	0
54	GK	(United States) USA	Luke Pruter	0	0	0+0	0	0+0	0	0+0	0	0+0	0

=== Disciplinary record ===
No.	Pos.	Name	MLS		MLS Cup Playoffs		CONCACAF Champions Cup		Leagues Cup		Total	
No.	Pos.	Name	Booked	Sent off (straight red)	Booked	Sent off (straight red)	Booked	Sent off (straight red)	Booked	Sent off (straight red)	Booked	Sent off (straight red)
1	GK	(United States) Nicholas Hagen	0	0	0	0	0	0	0	0	0	0
2	DF	(Argentina) Andrés Herrera	0	0	0	0	1	0	0	0	1	0
4	DF	(France) Rudy Camacho	0	0	0	0	0	0	0	0	0	0
6	MF	(United States) Darlington Nagbe	0	0	0	0	0	0	0	0	0	0
7	MF	(France) Dylan Chambost	1	0	0	0	0	0	0	0	1	0
10	FW	(Uruguay) Diego Rossi	1	0	0	0	0	0	0	0	1	0
11	MF	(Nigeria) Ibrahim Aliyu	0	0	0	0	0	0	0	0	0	0
13	MF	(Trinidad and Tobago) Aziel Jackson	0	0	0	0	0	0	0	0	0	0
14	MF	(Germany) Amar Sejdić	0	0	0	0	0	0	0	0	0	0
16	MF	(United States) Taha Habroune	0	0	0	0	0	0	0	0	0	0
18	DF	(Denmark) Malte Amundsen	2	1	0	0	0	0	0	0	2	1
19	FW	(United States) Jacen Russell-Rowe	2	0	0	0	0	0	0	0	2	0
20	MF	(United States) Derrick Jones	0	0	0	0	0	0	0	0	0	0
21	DF	(Ukraine) Yevhen Cheberko	1	0	0	0	0	0	0	0	1	0
22	GK	(Mexico) Abraham Romero	0	0	0	0	0	0	0	0	0	0
23	DF	(United States) Mohamed Farsi	1	0	0	0	0	0	0	0	1	0
24	GK	(United States) Evan Bush	0	0	0	0	0	0	0	0	0	0
25	MF	(United States) Sean Zawadzki	4	0	0	0	0	0	0	0	4	0
26	MF	(Finland) Lassi Lappalainen	0	0	0	0	0	0	0	0	0	0
27	FW	(United States) Maximilian Arfsten	3	0	0	0	0	0	0	0	3	0
28	GK	(United States) Patrick Schulte	2	0	0	0	0	0	0	0	2	0
29	MF	(United States) Cole Mrowka	0	0	0	0	0	0	0	0	0	0
31	DF	(Cape Verde) Steven Moreira	1	0	0	0	0	0	0	0	1	0
41	GK	(Belarus) Stanislav Lapkes	0	0	0	0	0	0	0	0	0	0
48	DF	(United States) Cesar Ruvalcaba	0	0	0	0	0	0	0	0	0	0
Players who left Columbus during the season:
12	DF	(United States) DeJuan Jones	0	0	0	0	0	0	0	0	0	0
44	MF	(United States) Tristan Brown	0	0	0	0	0	0	0	0	0	0
45	MF	(United States) Owen Presthus	0	0	0	0	0	0	0	0	0	0
46	FW	(United States) Chase Adams	0	0	0	0	0	0	0	0	0	0
54	GK	(United States) Luke Pruter	0	0	0	0	0	0	0	0	0	0

=== Clean sheets ===
No.	Name	MLS	MLS Cup Playoffs	CONCACAF Champions Cup	Leagues Cup	Total	Games Played
1	(Guatemala) Nicholas Hagen	0	0	0	0	0	0
22	(Mexico) Abraham Romero	0	0	0	0	0	0
24	(United States) Evan Bush	1	0	0	0	1	1
28	(United States) Patrick Schulte	2	0	0	0	2	13
41	(Belarus) Stanislav Lapkes	0	0	0	0	0	0
Players who left Columbus during the season:
54	(United States) Luke Pruter	0	0	0	0	0	0

== Transfers ==
=== In ===
Pos.	Player	Transferred from	Fee/notes	Date	Sources
MF	(Finland) Lassi Lappalainen	(Canada) CF Montréal	Free agent; signed to a one-year contract with an option for 2026	January 8, 2025	
GK	(Belarus) Stanislav Lapkes	(United States) Columbus Crew 2	Homegrown player, contract through 2027 with options for 2028 and 2029	January 22, 2025	
MF	(Germany) Amar Sejdić	(United States) Nashville SC	Contract through 2025 with option for 2026	March 3, 2025	
DF	(United States) Cesar Ruvalcaba	(United States) Columbus Crew 2	Contract through 2025 with options for 2026 and 2027	March 28, 2025	
FW	(Hungary) Dániel Gazdag	(United States) Philadelphia Union	Cash-for-player trade, $4,000,000 and up to $500,000 in conditional cash based on performance. Contract through 2025 with option for 2026	April 11, 2025	
FW	(Nigeria) Aliyu Ibrahim	(United States) Houston Dynamo	Cash-for-player trade, $450,000 and up to $750,000 in conditional cash based on performance. Contract through 2025 with options for 2026 and 2027	April 24, 2025	
MF	(France) Hugo Picard	(France) Guingamp	Contract through 2028 with an option for 2029	July 24, 2025	
FW	(Palestine) Wessam Abou Ali	(Egypt) Al Ahly	$7,500,000 transfer fee and up to $1,000,000 in add-ons. Contract through 2027 with an option for 2028	July 26, 2025	

=== Loan in ===
Pos.	Player	Parent club	Length/Notes	Beginning	End	Source
FW	(United States) Chase Adams	(United States) Columbus Crew 2	Short term agreements	February 22, 2025	February 22, 2025	
FW	(United States) Chase Adams	(United States) Columbus Crew 2	Short term agreements	March 22, 2025	March 22, 2025	
MF	(United States) Owen Presthus	(United States) Columbus Crew 2	Short term agreements	February 22, 2025	February 22, 2025	
MF	(United States) Owen Presthus	(United States) Columbus Crew 2	Short term agreements	March 22, 2025	March 22, 2025	
MF	(United States) Tristan Brown	(United States) Columbus Crew 2	Short term agreements	February 22, 2025	February 22, 2025	
MF	(United States) Tristan Brown	(United States) Columbus Crew 2	Short term agreements	March 22, 2025	March 22, 2025	
MF	(United States) Tristan Brown	(United States) Columbus Crew 2	Short term agreements	May 14, 2025	May 14, 2025	
DF	(United States) Cesar Ruvalcaba	(United States) Columbus Crew 2	Short term agreements	March 8, 2025	March 8, 2025	
DF	(United States) Cesar Ruvalcaba	(United States) Columbus Crew 2	Short term agreements	March 15, 2025	March 15, 2025	
DF	(United States) Cesar Ruvalcaba	(United States) Columbus Crew 2	Short term agreements	March 22, 2025	March 22, 2025	
GK	(United States) Luke Pruter	(United States) Columbus Crew 2	Short term agreement	March 22, 2025	March 22, 2025	

=== Out ===
Pos.	Player	Transferred to	Fee/notes	Date	Source
MF	(Colombia) Marino Hinestroza	(Colombia) Atlético Nacional	Transfer for undisclosed fee; Columbus retains a sell-on percentage	January 27, 2025	
FW	(Colombia) Cucho Hernández	(Spain) Real Betis	Transfer, $16 million plus add-ons	February 3, 2025	
FW	(United States) Christian Ramirez	(United States) LA Galaxy	Trade, $250,000 in 2025 General Allocation Money plus $250,000 in conditional 2026 General Allocation Money	February 12, 2025	
DF	(United States) DeJuan Jones	(United States) San Jose Earthquakes	Trade, $175,000 in 2025 General Allocation Money, $250,000 in 2026 General Allocation Money and a 2025 International Roster Slot	April 22, 2025	

=== Loans out ===
Pos.	Player	Loanee club	Length/Notes	Beginning	End	Source
GK	(Mexico) Abraham Romero	(United States) Colorado Springs Switchbacks FC	Columbus retains right to recall	February 21, 2025	May 31, 2025	
GK	(Belarus) Stanislav Lapkes	(United States) Columbus Crew 2	First team loan to affiliate	March 19, 2025	May 18, 2025	
MF	(United States) Cole Mrowka	(United States) Columbus Crew 2	First team loan to affiliate	April 6, 2025	May 18, 2025	
MF	(Germany) Amar Sejdić	(United States) Columbus Crew 2	First team loan to affiliate	April 6, 2025	April 6, 2025	
DF	(United States) Cesar Ruvalcaba	(United States) Columbus Crew 2	First team loan to affiliate	April 27, 2025	May 18, 2025	
GK	(Guatemala) Nicholas Hagen	(United States) Columbus Crew 2	First team loan to affiliate	April 27, 2025	April 27, 2025	
MF	(United States) Taha Habroune	(United States) Columbus Crew 2	First team loan to affiliate	April 27, 2025	May 18, 2025	

=== MLS SuperDraft picks ===
Draft picks are not automatically signed to the team roster. Only those who are signed to a contract will be listed as transfers in. The picks for the Columbus Crew are listed below:

2025 Columbus Crew SuperDraft Picks
Round	Pick	Player	Position	College
2	51	(United States) Cesar Ruvalcaba	DF	SMU
3	81	(United States) Drew Kerr	FW	Duke

== Awards ==
MLS Team of the Matchday
Matchday	Starters	Bench	Opponent(s)	Link
1	(Uruguay) Diego Rossi		(United States) Chicago Fire FC	
2	(Algeria) Mohamed Farsi		(United States) New England Revolution	
6	(Uruguay) Diego Rossi		(United States) D.C. United	
7	(Canada) Jacen Russell-Rowe		(Canada) CF Montréal	
8	(Cape Verde) Steven Moreira	(Uruguay) Diego Rossi	(United States) St. Louis CITY SC	
10	(United States) Maximilian Arfsten		(United States) San Jose Earthquakes	
11	(France) Dylan Chambost (France) Wilfried Nancy (Coach)	(Algeria) Mohamed Farsi	(United States) Charlotte FC	
12	(United States) Sean Zawadzki		(United States) Philadelphia Union	
14		(Uruguay) Diego Rossi	(United States) FC Cincinnati	
19		(Uruguay) Diego Rossi	(United States) Atlanta United FC	
20	(Argentina) Andrés Herrera	(Canada) Jacen Russell-Rowe	(United States) Philadelphia Union	
21	(Algeria) Mohamed Farsi		(United States) Seattle Sounders FC	
24	(United States) Maximilian Arfsten (France) Wilfried Nancy (Coach)	(Uruguay) Diego Rossi	(United States) FC Cincinnati	
26		(Hungary) Dániel Gazdag	(United States) D.C. United (United States) Orlando City SC	
