= Wilfried Nancy =

French football manager (born 1977)

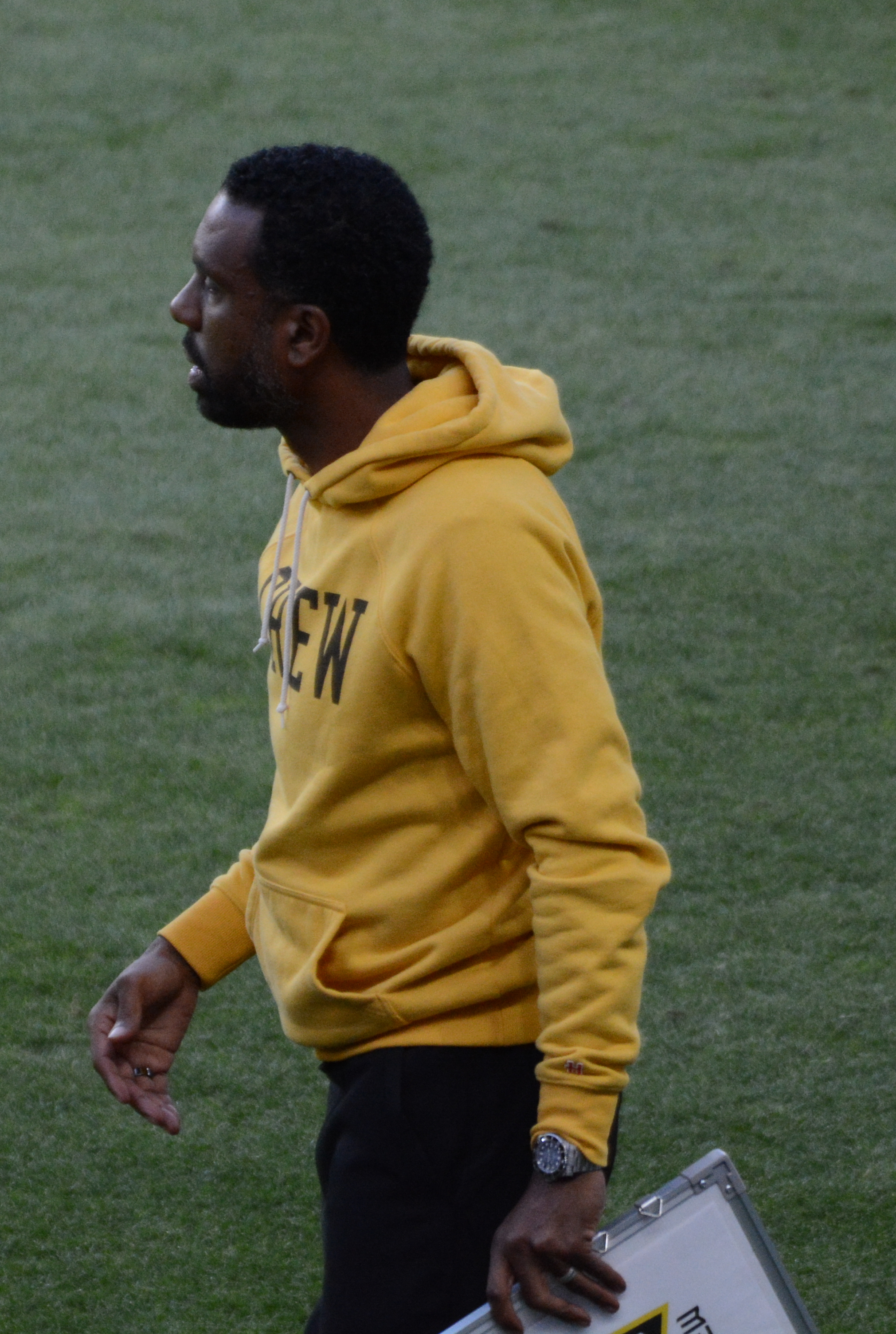
- Nancy in 2023

Personal information
- Date of birth: 9 April 1977 (age 49)
- Place of birth: Le Havre, France
- Height: 1.85 m (6 ft 1 in)
- Position: Defender

College career
Years	Team	Apps	(Gls)
2005	UQAM Citadins		

Senior career*
Years	Team	Apps	(Gls)
1995–1998	Toulon	9	(0)
1998–1999	Beaucairois	4	(0)
1999–2000	Raon-l'Étape	3	(0)
2000–2001	Ivry		
2001–2002	Noisy-le-Sec	8	(1)
2002–2003	Châtellerault	2	(0)
2003–2005	Orléans		
Total		26	(1)

Managerial career
- 2021–2022: CF Montréal
- 2022–2025: Columbus Crew
- 2025–2026: Celtic
- * Club domestic league appearances and goals

Wilfried Nancy (born 9 April 1977) is a French professional football manager and former player who was most recently the manager of Scottish Premiership club Celtic.

Growing up in Le Havre, Nancy started his playing career for Toulon before moving to various amateur and semi-professional clubs. He then entered coaching and moved to Canada in 2011 to join the Montreal Impact Academy upon its foundation. He became manager for MLS club CF Montréal in 2021, before moving to Columbus Crew in 2022. He won MLS Cup in 2023, and in 2024, he won the MLS Coach of the Year award as the Crew won Leagues Cup and finished runners-up in the CONCACAF Champions Cup. He joined Celtic in December 2025, but was sacked a month later after losing six of his eight matches in charge.

== Early life ==
Nancy was born in Le Havre to a Guadeloupean father and Senegalese-Cape Verdean mother. His father was in the French Navy, and Nancy therefore spent his early childhood frequently moving, with time in Guadeloupe, Martinique, Djibouti and Réunion. At the age of 11, his family moved to Toulon and there he started playing organised football before moving to the academy of Toulon at the age of 14.

== Playing career ==
Nancy played professionally in France as a defender, and began his career with Toulon. He also had stints at various amateur and semi-professional clubs, including Beaucairois, Raon-l'Étape, Ivry, Noisy-le-Sec, Châtellerault and Orléans, before moving to Canada in August 2005 to play with the UQAM team. During his time at UQAM he was voted most valuable player in Quebec, in addition to being named to the first all-star team in Quebec and Canada. He also helped the Citadins finish second in the Quebec conference.

== Managerial career ==
In 2005, while playing for UQAM, Nancy became a coach for Collège Stanislas. After retiring as a footballer, he became a full-time coach in 2006 and started coaching AAA soccer; the highest amateur league level in Québec. He coached Québec's provincial teams from 2007, and was also assistant technical director of the Association régionale de soccer de la Rive-Sud in 2008.

He was part of the Montreal Impact Academy since its inception in 2011 starting with the U18s, then the U21s in 2014, followed by the U16s from 2014 to 2015. He was promoted to assistant coach of the first team on 7 January 2016.

=== CF Montréal ===
On 8 March 2021, following Thierry Henry's resignation, Nancy was promoted to head coach for CF Montréal becoming the club's first coach following their re-branding from the Impact name.

On 28 May 2021, after just seven games as head coach, it was announced that CF Montréal had exercised its option on Nancy's contract for the 2022 season. Nancy led CF Montréal to the 2021 Canadian Championship final, beating Toronto FC to qualify for the 2022 CONCACAF Champions League.

During the 2022 Major League Soccer season, Nancy's CF Montréal lost in the quarter-finals of the CONCACAF Champions League to Cruz Azul. On 9 July, Nancy and Montréal owner Joey Saputo got into a verbal altercation, with Saputo wanting to voice his frustration with the club's loss to bottom of the table Sporting KC. After that incident, Nancy requested to leave immediately, but changed his mind after discussions with his players.

Nancy finished the 2022 regular season with the second-best record in the East, while setting numerous franchise-records including 20 wins (with an MLS record 11 away wins) and 65 points in the regular season. During the playoffs, CF Montréal would lose to New York City FC in the conference semi-finals. Nancy narrowly lost the MLS Coach of the Year award, losing by one-tenth of a percentage point to Jim Curtin. Due to a clause in his contract, Nancy's 2023 contract option was automatically triggered by guiding the club to the 2022 MLS Cup Playoffs.

=== Columbus Crew ===
Nancy was announced as head coach of Columbus Crew on 6 December 2022, after Crew were required to compensate Montréal since Nancy was still under contract. In his first season as coach, the Crew finished third in the regular season, with observers describing an attractive style of football.

In the postseason, Columbus overcame rivals FC Cincinnati in the conference finals to defeat defending champions Los Angeles FC in the final which made Nancy the first Black coach to win the MLS Cup. This was followed by the Crew winning the Leagues Cup and finishing runners-up in the CONCACAF Champions Cup in the 2024 season. For his success with the Crew, Nancy won the MLS Coach of the Year award on 20 November 2024.

During the 2025 season, under Nancy, the club finished in seventh place in the Eastern Conference, losing in the first round of the playoffs to FC Cincinnati.

=== Celtic ===
On 3 December 2025, Scottish Premiership club Celtic announced Nancy as their new manager on a two-and-a-half year contract, which took effect the following day. He lost his first match in charge on 7 December, a 2–1 home defeat against league leaders Heart of Midlothian. This was followed by a 3–0 loss to Roma in the Europa League, as Nancy became the first Celtic manager to lose his opening two matches. Two further defeats, 3–1 to St Mirren in the Scottish League Cup final and 2–1 to eighth-place Dundee United in the Scottish Premiership, saw Celtic suffer four consecutive defeats for the first time since 1978, when Jock Stein was manager. He earned his first win with the club on 21 December, securing a 3–1 victory over Aberdeen.

Despite a 4–2 victory against Livingston, defeats to Motherwell and Old Firm rivals Rangers saw Nancy sacked on 5 January 2026. With a tenure of 33 days, he became the shortest-tenured manager in Celtic's history, and holds the record for the worst win percentage of any Old Firm manager, with just 25%.

== Manager profile ==
=== Tactics ===
Wilfried Nancy is recognised for his possession-based, attacking style of play, emphasizing creativity within a structured system. His teams typically employ a 3–4–2–1 formation, which often transitions into a 3–2–5 in possession phases. The system prioritises numerical superiority in attacking positions, with defenders participating in build-up play and midfielders serving as relay players to advance the ball. Nancy encourages players to maintain possession while inviting opponents to press, creating space to exploit with short, quick combinations or line-breaking passes. His teams have been described as dynamic, proactive, and capable of high-tempo positional play, with the Columbus Crew in particular being lauded as "one of the most entertaining teams in MLS," combining structured build-up with creative freedom for individual players.

Nancy has described his philosophy as prioritizing bravery and creativity within a structured system, stating: "The type of profile that I'm looking for is one, effort, two, brain, and three, audacity… The idea is to play with the opposition". He also emphasises the importance of decision-making and awareness, saying: "The scoreboard is not important. What is important is what we want to do with the ball and without the ball". Players are expected to read the game constantly, adjust in real time, communicate effectively, and sacrifice for the collective. Goalkeepers and defenders are expected to play with composure under pressure, finding gaps between opposition lines and starting sequences deliberately rather than clearing the ball aimlessly. Wing-backs and wide attackers are tasked with stretching the field, creating overloads, and interchanging positions. Nancy’s midfielders often act as relays between the defensive line and attacking units, while forwards exploit spaces created by coordinated movement. His teams also implement an aggressive counter-press to regain possession quickly after losing the ball. Players under Nancy must be comfortable with the ball, able to invite pressure from opponents, and capable of contributing both offensively and defensively. The three center backs in his system are dynamic in joining attacks while remaining disciplined to defend against counterattacks. Columbus’ strategy under Nancy was to attack with numbers, overwhelm opponents inside their own half, and maintain possession to control the tempo.

=== Reception ===
Nancy has been widely praised for his innovative approach to football and his ability to create cohesive, entertaining, attack-minded teams. Players have noted the impact of Nancy’s coaching philosophy on their development, with centre-back Steven Moreira commenting on how his role changed within the system: "I no longer play my position which was right-back. I play defender in a three-man defense and I have freedom that is incredible. I almost often find myself in front of goal. [I]t's really all about the attack, scoring as many goals as possible. Of course, we take risks so we will cash in. But the objective is to score the most". Wing-back Alistair Johnston described adapting to Nancy’s system, saying: "You're going to have to forget how you were taught to play, to a certain degree". Midfielder Aidan Morris noted the importance of timing and movement: "A lot of it's tempo…Realizing when to speed up and slow down I think is important…Moving when you don't have the ball. All of that stuff comes into play with what he's trying to teach us". Former player Giorgio Chiellini described his style, saying: “[Columbus] has a fantastic maestro in Nancy… Their style of play is incredible. What's most special is that they are so effective. They don’t just play a nice style of game".

== Managerial statistics ==
As of match played 3 January 2026

Managerial record by team and tenure
Team	From	To	Record								Ref
Team	From	To	G	W	D	L	GF	GA	GD	Win %	Ref
CF Montréal	8 March 2021	6 December 2022	79	37	17	25	123	105	+18	46.84	
Columbus Crew	6 December 2022	3 December 2025	136	69	37	30	262	179	+83	50.74	
Celtic	4 December 2025	5 January 2026	8	2	0	6	11	18	−7	25.00	
Total			223	108	54	61	396	302	+94	48.43	

== Honours ==
CF Montreal

- Canadian Championship: 2021

Columbus Crew

- MLS Cup: 2023
- Leagues Cup: 2024

Individual

- MLS Coach of the Year: 2024
