= Steven Moreira =

Cape Verdean footballer (born 1994)

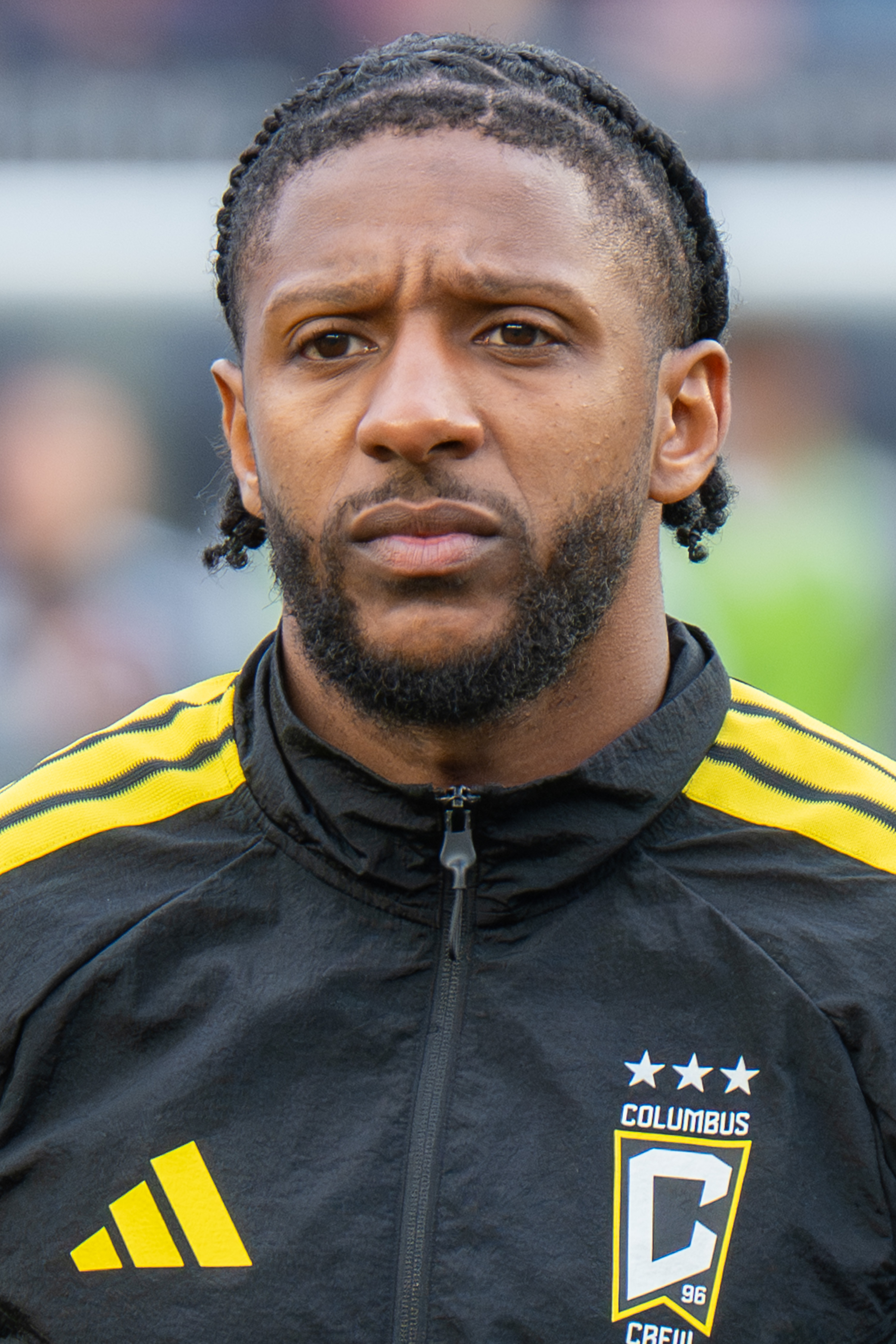
- Moreira with the Columbus Crew in 2026

Personal information
- Date of birth: 13 August 1994 (age 32)
- Place of birth: Noisy-le-Grand, France
- Height: 1.76 m (5 ft 9 in)
- Positions: Right-back; centre-back

Team information
- Current team: Columbus Crew
- Number: 31

Youth career
- 2000–2005: AS Champs-sur-Marne
- 2005–2009: US Torcy
- 2009–2013: Rennes

Senior career*
Years	Team	Apps	(Gls)
2011–2016	Rennes B	24	(0)
2013–2016	Rennes	58	(0)
2016–2018	Lorient	63	(1)
2018–2021	Toulouse	58	(1)
2018	Toulouse B	3	(0)
2021–	Columbus Crew	162	(4)

International career^{‡}
2009	France U16	1	(0)
2013	France U19	7	(0)
2014	France U20	2	(0)
2015	France U21	4	(0)
2023–	Cape Verde	24	(0)
- * Club domestic league appearances and goals as of 8 November 2026 ‡ National team caps and goals as of 00:29, 27 July 2026 (UTC)

Steven Moreira (Portuguese: [ˈsti˸.vən mu.ˈɾej.ɾɐ]; born 13 August 1994) is a professional footballer who plays as a right-back or centre-back for Major League Soccer club Columbus Crew. Born in France, he plays for the Cape Verde national team.

Moreira began his senior career with Rennes, making his Ligue 1 debut in 2013 and appearing in the 2014 Coupe de France final. After spells with Lorient and Toulouse, he joined Major League Soccer club Columbus Crew in 2021. At Columbus, he began as a right-back, but established himself as one of the league's top central defenders in 2023, helping the club win the 2023 MLS Cup and the 2024 Leagues Cup. In 2024, he was named MLS Defender of the Year and was selected to the MLS Best XI.

== Youth and club career ==
=== Rennes ===
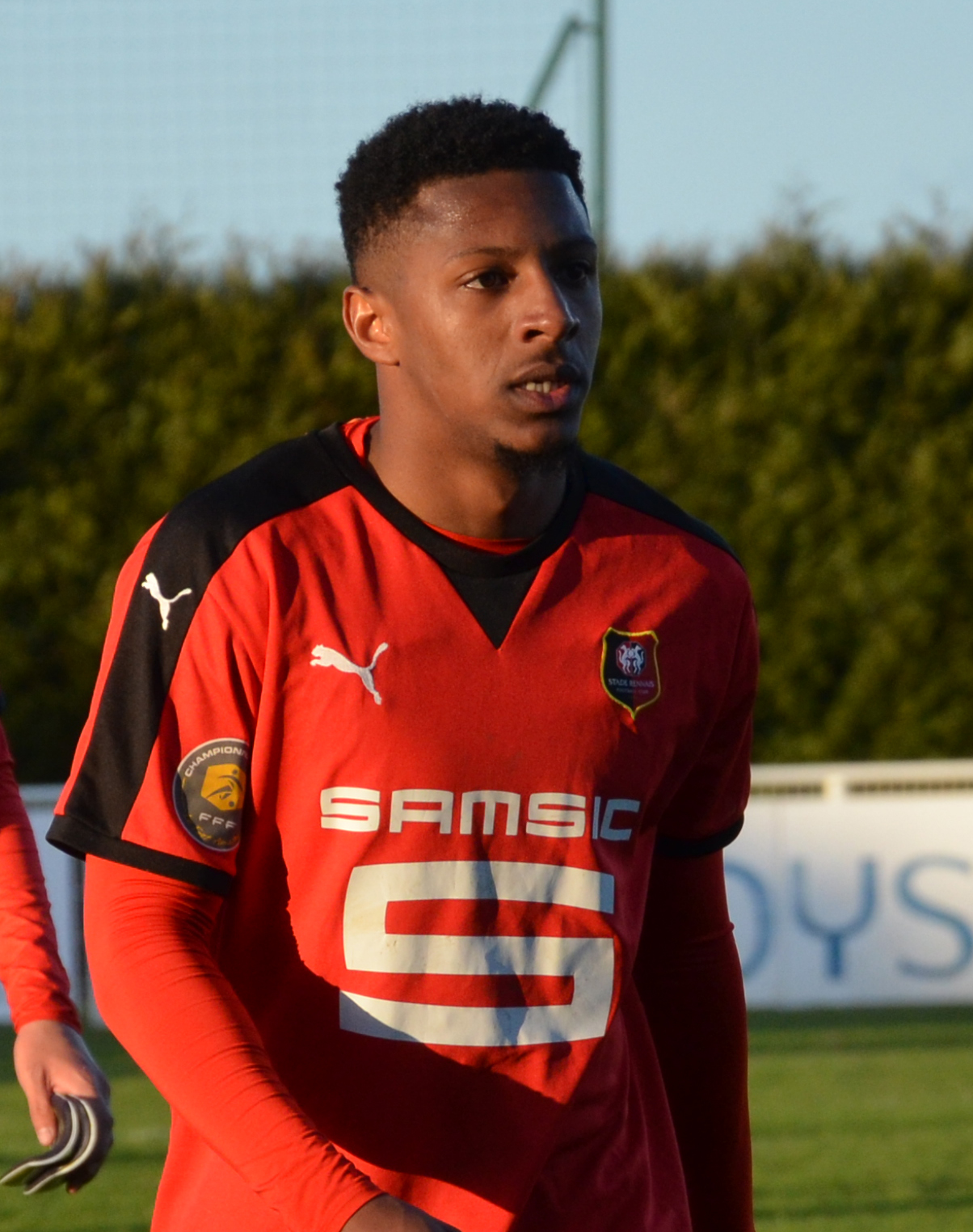
Moreira playing for Rennes B in 2016

Moreira first began with AS Champs-sur-Marne in 2000, staying there for five years until he joined US Torcy in 2005. He later joined the Rennes youth academy in 2009, and secured a professional contract with the Breton side in 2013. While at Rennes, he played both full-back positions and on the wing at times, making his debut for the club on 11 May 2013 in a Ligue 1 clash. In the 2013–14 season, he appeared sparingly to start the year, playing in three of the first four games to start the new campaign, before being benched and not appearing for over three months. He appeared in the Coupe de France final, losing to Guingamp 2–0 in a Derby Breton. He scored his first goal for Rennes on 19 January 2016 in a Coupe de France match, netting his team's only goal in a 3–1 loss to Bourg-en-Bresse.

=== FC Lorient ===
Moreria joined FC Lorient on 30 August 2016 for a reported €1.2 million, signing a four-year deal. After his first season in Lorient, his side were relegated to Ligue 2. During the following season, he scored a goal against RC Lens in the second round of the Coupe de la Ligue in August 2017, and on 29 January 2018 scored the only goal in a victory versus eventual Ligue 2 champions Reims. He moved to central defense in a game against Nancy late in the season, remaining at that position for two months, before returning to right-back. Manager Mickaël Landreau later explained the decision was designed “to establish his leadership,” believing the role allowed those qualities to come through more clearly.

=== Toulouse ===
After two years in at Lorient, Moreira was transferred to Ligue 1 side Toulouse on 10 August 2018 and agreed to terms on a three-year deal. His first year with Toulouse was forgettable, as he appeared in just 14 matches across all competitions, with his only win coming in the Coupe de France match against Nice. During the 2019–20 season, he incurred a three-match suspension following a red card received during a match against Marseille on 24 November 2019. On 15 February 2020, he was shown a red card for a foul on Adam Ounas, resulting in another three-match suspension. At the conclusion of the season, his side were relegated to Ligue 2. After missing the first four games of the 2020–21 season due to COVID-19, He would score his only goal for the club on 26 September 2020, coming on as a second-half substitute and contributing to a 3–1 victory at home for Les Violets. On 20 March 2021, Moreira received a red card in a 1–0 defeat against Niort, serving a three-match suspension as a result.

=== Columbus Crew ===
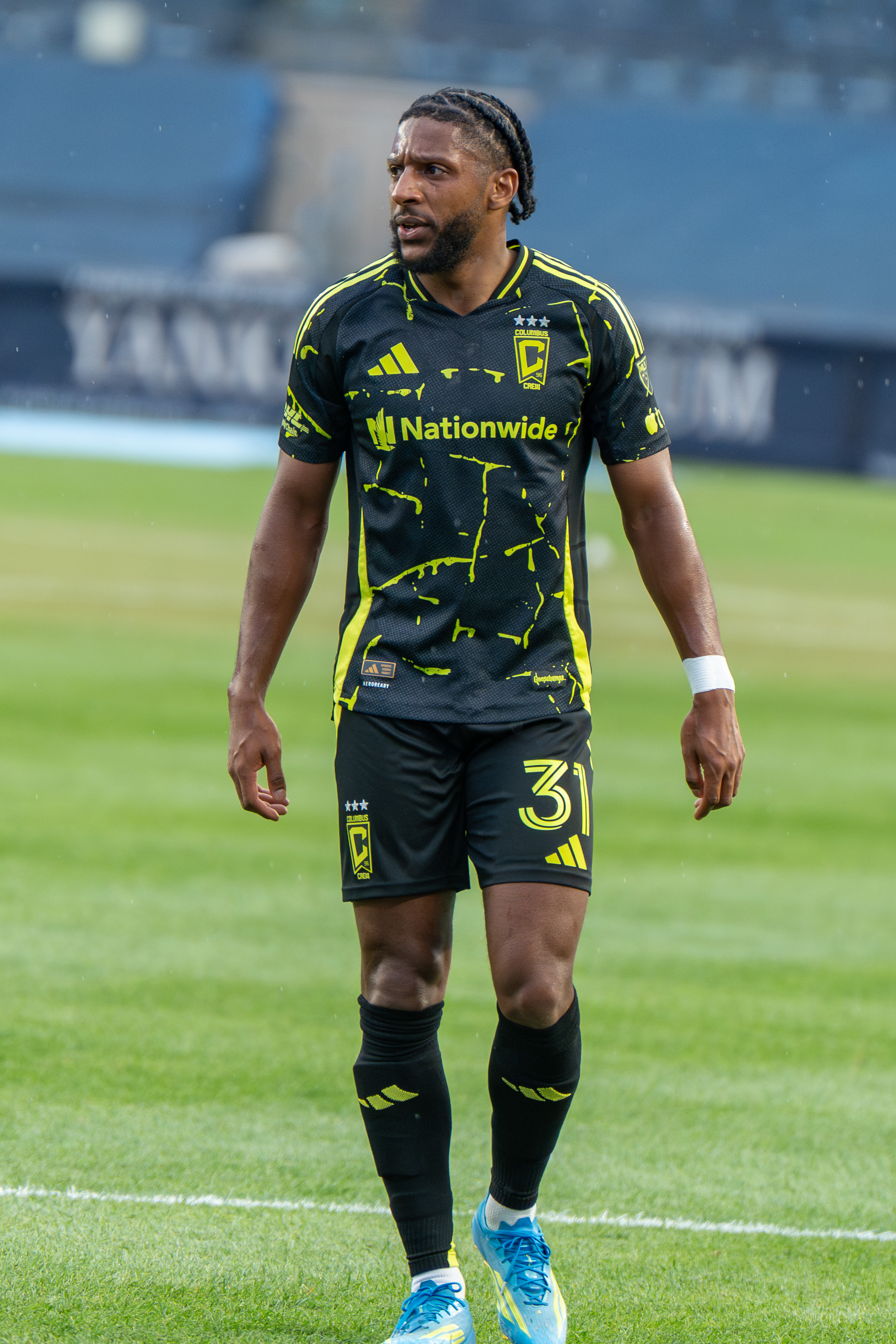
Moreira with the Columbus Crew in 2026

After declining to take a pay cut to remain with Toulouse, Moreira left France and signed with Major League Soccer club Columbus Crew in August 2021. Moreira joined on a free transfer, and signed a contract until the end of the 2021 season, with team options to extend his contract until the end of the 2023 season, arriving as the potential successor to Harrison Afful. After Afful suffered a knee injury, Moreira became the starter for the remainder of the 2021 season for Columbus. He appeared in eight total matches in his first season in the United States, including making his team debut in the Campeones Cup victory versus Cruz Azul.

During the 2022 season, Moreira was entrenched as the full time right-back for Columbus, starting 32 games for the Black and Gold. On 27 August 2022, Moreira scored his first goal for the Crew, a right-footed volley in the 96th minute to tie Hell is Real rivals FC Cincinnati 2–2.

During the 2023 season, Moreira moved to centre-back in a back three, and became a key contributor for a Columbus side that won MLS Cup 3–1 against Los Angeles FC. Described as having a "unique role", he was given the freedom to carry the ball high into the midfield or make line-splitting passes. After the final, it was announced that he extended his contract until 2025, with an option for 2026.

Moreira's 2024 season began with regular appearances in the starting eleven, including starting all matches and playing every minute in the CONCACAF Champions Cup through the final, where Columbus were beaten 3–0 by Pachuca at Estadio Hidalgo. He scored his first goal of the season with a 30-yard shot in a 2–2 home draw to the Portland Timbers on 20 April. Moreira made his 100th appearance across all competitions for the club when he started the match against CF Montreal on 15 May. During the Leagues Cup, Moreira once again started every match and played every minute for Columbus, as they went on to win the tournament, defeating Los Angeles FC in the final. An ankle injury would keep Moreira out of the final three games of the regular season, as Columbus finished with a club-record 66 points but were eliminated from the playoffs in the first round by the New York Red Bulls. Moreira ended the season with 42 appearances across all competitions, and was named Major League Soccer Defender of the Year and on the Major League Soccer Best XI.

In 2025, Moreira scored once during the season, netting his only goal in a 2–1 victory over St. Louis City on 13 April. The goal came from a cross by Max Arfsten after Moreira made a late run into the penalty area. Moreira made 30 regular-season appearances, including 29 starts, and started all three playoff matches for Columbus.

== International career ==
=== France ===
Born in France, Moreira is a former France youth international. Notably, he played at the 2013 UEFA European Under-19 Championship, finishing as the runner-up.

=== Cape Verde ===
Moreira is of Cape Verdean descent, as his parents were born there. He was approached by Cape Verde when he was "about 18 or 19,” but declined because he was involved with the France national youth team. In October 2023, he accepted a call up to the Cape Verde national team for a set of friendlies. He debuted with Cape Verde in a 5–1 loss to Algeria on 12 October 2023. He was part of the Cape Verde team that made the quarter-finals of the 2023 Africa Cup of Nations.

On 18 May 2026, he was called up by Cape Verde's head coach Bubista for the 2026 FIFA World Cup. He played in four games in the World Cup, as Cape Verde was defeated by Argentina 3–2 in the round of 32.

== Style of play ==
Moreira has mainly been deployed as an attacking right-back in his career, and has been noted for his intelligence, leadership, crossing ability, and calmness under pressure. Since 2023, he has shifted to a right-sided centre-back in a back three. Speaking about the change, Moreira said: "I no longer play in my position, which was right-back. I play as a defender in a three-man defense and I have incredible freedom. I find myself almost often in front of goal."

== Personal life ==
Moreira is Muslim and fasts during the month of Ramadan.

== Career statistics ==
=== Club ===
As of match played 24 May 2026

Appearances and goals by club, season and competition
Club	Season	League			National cup (Note: Includes Coupe de France, U.S. Open Cup)		League cup (Note: Includes Coupe de la Ligue)		Continental		Other		Total	
Club	Season	Division	Apps	Goals	Apps	Goals	Apps	Goals	Apps	Goals	Apps	Goals	Apps	Goals
Rennes B	2010–11	CFA	1	0	—		—		—		—		1	0
Rennes B	2012–13	CFA 2	15	0	—		—		—		—		15	0
Rennes B	2013–14	CFA 2	3	0	—		—		—		—		3	0
Rennes B	2014–15	CFA 2	1	0	—		—		—		—		1	0
Rennes B	2015–16	CFA 2	4	0	—		—		—		—		4	0
Rennes B	Total		24	0	—		—		—		—		24	0
Rennes	2012–13	Ligue 1	3	0	0	0	0	0	—		—		3	0
Rennes	2013–14	Ligue 1	15	0	4	0	2	0	—		—		21	0
Rennes	2014–15	Ligue 1	23	0	3	0	3	0	—		—		29	0
Rennes	2015–16	Ligue 1	16	0	1	0	2	0	—		—		19	0
Rennes	2016–17	Ligue 1	1	0	0	0	0	0	—		—		1	0
Rennes	Total		58	0	8	0	7	0	—		—		73	0
Lorient	2016–17	Ligue 1	28	0	2	0	1	0	—		2 (Note: Appearance(s) in Ligue 1 relegation/promotion play-offs)	0	33	0
Lorient	2017–18	Ligue 2	35	1	3	0	3	1	—		—		41	2
Lorient	Total		63	1	5	0	4	1	—		2	0	74	2
Toulouse B	2018–19	Championnat National 3	3	0	—		—		—		—		3	0
Toulouse	2018–19	Ligue 1	10	0	3	0	1	0	—		—		14	0
Toulouse	2019–20	Ligue 1	17	0	1	0	2	0	—		—		20	0
Toulouse	2020–21	Ligue 2	31	1	2	0	—		—		1	0	34	1
Toulouse	Total		58	1	6	0	3	0	—		1	0	68	1
Columbus Crew	2021	MLS	7	0	—		—		—		1 (Note: Appearance in Campeones Cup)	0	8	0
Columbus Crew	2022	MLS	32	1	0	0	—		—		—		32	1
Columbus Crew	2023	MLS	34	0	1	0	—		—		8 (Note: Two appearances and one goal in Leagues Cup, six appearances in MLS Cup playoffs)	1	43	1
Columbus Crew	2024	MLS	27	2	—		—		7 (Note: Appearances in CONCACAF Champions Cup)	0	8 (Note: Five appearances in Leagues Cup, one appearance in Campeones Cup, two appearances in MLS Cup playoffs)	0	42	2
Columbus Crew	2025	MLS	30	1	—		—		2	0	6 (Note: Three appearances in Leagues Cup, three appearances in MLS Cup playoffs)	0	38	1
Columbus Crew	2026	MLS	14	0	1	0	—		—		0	0	15	0
Columbus Crew	Total		144	4	2	0	—		9	0	23	1	178	5
Career total			350	6	21	0	14	1	9	0	26	1	420	8

=== International ===
As of match played 3 July 2026

Appearances and goals by national team and year
National team	Year	Apps	Goals
Cape Verde	2023	1	0
Cape Verde	2024	12	0
Cape Verde	2025	4	0
Cape Verde	2026	7	0
Total		24	0

== Honours ==
Columbus Crew

- MLS Cup: 2023
- Leagues Cup: 2024
- Campeones Cup: 2021
- CONCACAF Champions Cup runner-up: 2024

Individual

- MLS All-Star: 2024, 2026
- MLS Defender of the Year: 2024
- MLS Best XI: 2024
