= Max Arfsten =

American soccer player (born 2001)

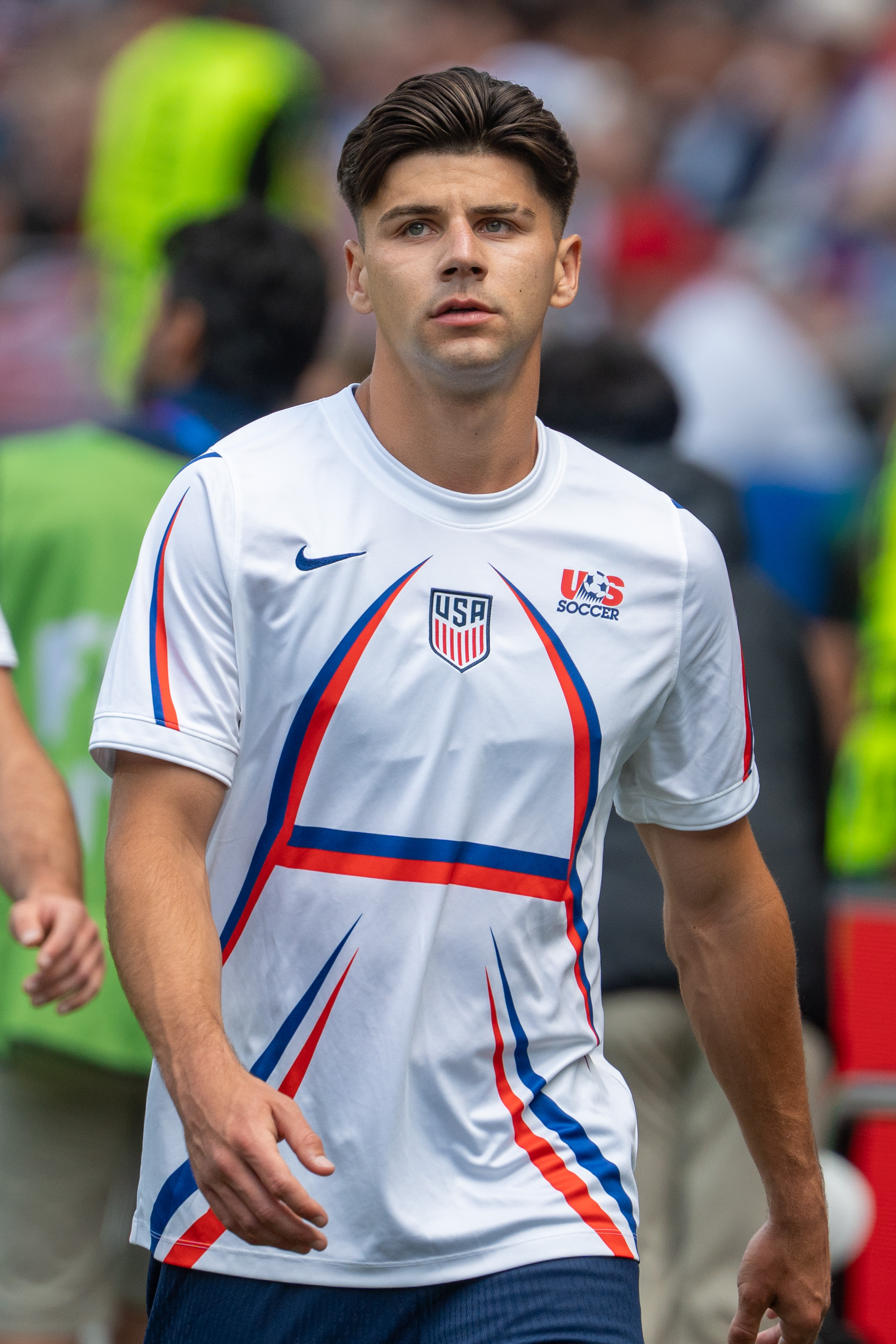
- Arfsten with the United States in 2026

Personal information
- Full name: Maximilian Michael Arfsten
- Date of birth: April 19, 2001 (age 25)
- Place of birth: Fresno, California, United States
- Height: 6 ft 1 in (1.85 m)
- Positions: Left-back; left wing-back

Team information
- Current team: Middlesbrough
- Number: 17

Youth career
- 2010–2019: California Odyssey

College career
Years	Team	Apps	(Gls)
2019–2021	UC Davis Aggies	39	(9)

Senior career*
Years	Team	Apps	(Gls)
2022	San Jose Earthquakes II	24	(9)
2023–2026	Columbus Crew	89	(14)
2023	→ Columbus Crew 2	1	(0)
2026–	Middlesbrough	14	(1)

International career^{‡}
2025–	United States	21	(1)
Medal record
Representing United States
Runner-up	CONCACAF Gold Cup	2025
- * Club domestic league appearances and goals as of November 7, 2026 ‡ National team caps and goals as of July 6, 2026

Maximilian "Max" Michael Arfsten (born April 19, 2001) is an American professional soccer player who plays as a left-back or left wing-back for EFL Championship club Middlesbrough, and the United States national team.

== Early years ==
=== Youth ===
Arfsten attended San Joaquin Memorial High School. In 2016, he posted 21 goals, 11 assists and earned all-league first team honors. He ended his junior season with All-CMAC first team recognition and league MVP honors by posting 20 goals and 21 assists. He helped the team win the league and Central Section championships that year, also earning all-league first team honors for the third straight season, and captured league MVP accolades for the second year in a row after ending his final season with 50 goals and 20 assists. Arfsten also played club soccer with local side California Odyssey for nine years, where he was the leading National Premier League goal scorer.

=== College ===
In 2019, Arfsten attended the University of California, Davis to play college soccer. Between 2019 and 2021, he made 39 appearances for the Aggies, scoring nine goals and tallying eight assists. He earned Big West Conference All-Freshman Team honors in 2019. His sophomore season was canceled due to COVID-19, and just ahead of his junior season, he broke his foot and was out for five months. He was named Big West Offensive Player of the Year and All-Big West First Team in 2021. Prior to the 2022 season, Arfsten opted to leave college early and play professionally.

== Club career ==
=== San Jose Earthquakes II ===
In 2022, he signed his first contract with MLS Next Pro side San Jose Earthquakes II ahead of their inaugural season. In his lone season with the Quakes reserve team, Arfsten scored nine goals in 24 appearances.

=== Columbus Crew ===
==== 2023 ====
In December 2022, Arfsten was announced as eligible for selection in the 2023 MLS SuperDraft. He was selected 14th overall by the Columbus Crew on December 21, 2022. He signed a two-year deal with the Major League Soccer side on February 21, 2023. Arfsten made his debut and scored his first goal for Columbus on March 25, 2023, in a 6–1 victory over Atlanta United after coming on as a late substitute. He made his first start on June 3, replacing Mohamed Farsi in the starting lineup after the wing-back was injured during warmups. Playing on the right side, Arfsten scored and assisted in the 4–2 win against Charlotte FC. During the 2023 playoffs, he scored in the only match he appeared in as his side would go on to win the MLS Cup.

==== 2024 ====
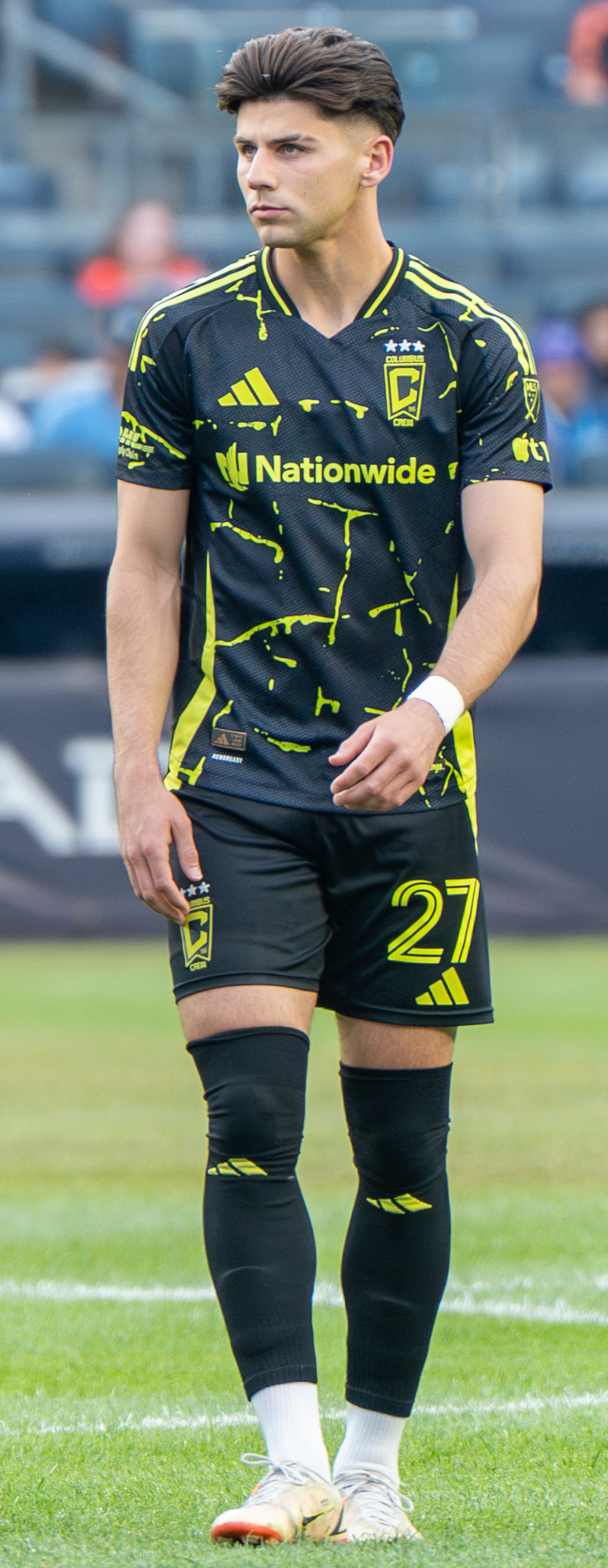
Arfsten with the Colombus Crew in 2026

During the 2024 season, Arfsten entrenched himself as the starting left wing-back in a 3–5–2 formation. He made his CONCACAF Champions Cup debut off the bench on March 6, 2024, in a 1–0 win for the Crew against the Houston Dynamo in the round-of-16. On April 9, Arfsten took the final penalty in the shootout win versus Tigres UANL at Estadio Universitario to send Columbus to the semifinals of the Champions Cup. He scored in back-to-back league games on May 11 and 15. During the 2024 Leagues Cup, Arfsten started all five games as his club won the tournament. On September 21, he had two assists in the match against Orlando City, with the first assist coming with his left foot while the second came from his right. On October 16, it was announced that Arfsten had signed a contract extension until 2027, with a club option for 2028.

==== 2025 ====
Arfsten scored his first goal in 2025 against expansion side San Diego FC, in a 1–1 draw at Snapdragon Stadium.

=== Middlesbrough ===
On August 4, 2026, EFL Championship club Middlesbrough announced the signing of Arfsten to a four-year contract.

On September 19, 2026, Arfsten scored his first goal for the club in a 2–2 draw with Birmingham City at St. Andrews.

== International career ==
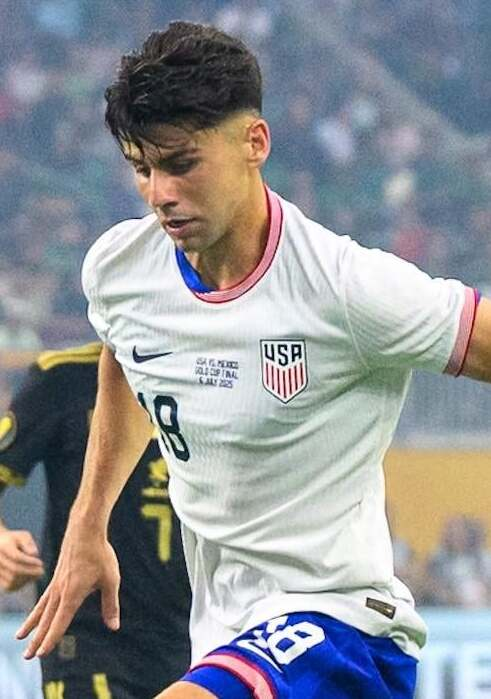
Arfsten with the United States in 2025.

On January 6, 2025, Arfsten was called up to the United States national team by head coach Mauricio Pochettino ahead of the January camp in Florida, with friendlies against Venezuela and Costa Rica. Arfsten made his debut on January 18, 2025, versus Venezuela. Arfsten netted his first career international goal in the semifinals of the 2025 CONCACAF Gold Cup against Panama. He played significant minutes in the tournament, starting in all but one game for the U.S., as they finished runner-up in the competition to Mexico.

On May 26, 2026, Arfsten was selected in the 26-man squad for the 2026 FIFA World Cup.

== Style of play ==
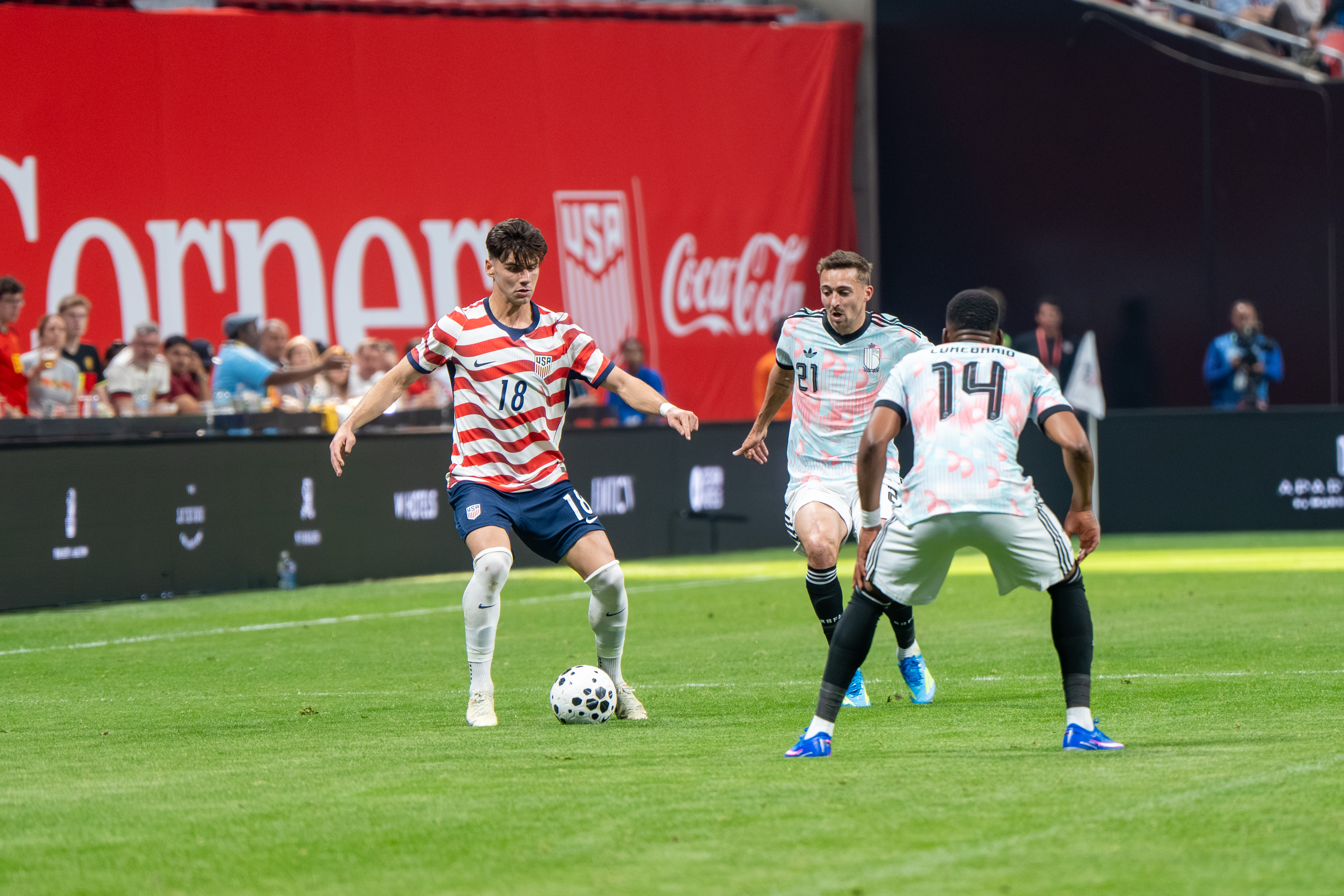
Arfsten (left) in a match against Belgium.

A two-footed player, Arfsten has been noted for his bravery, technical ability, and penchant for taking players on via the dribble. He has described himself as a player that "like[s] to dribble a lot and be shifty as much as I can, just to create chances, so I think my aggressiveness in my attack sets me apart."

== Personal life ==
Arfsten is of Armenian descent; his family comes from an Armenian community in Fresno, California. Arfsten has stated that his soccer inspiration is Neymar.

== Career statistics ==
=== Club ===
As of match played November 7, 2026

Appearances and goals by club, season and competition
Club	Season	League			National cup (Note: Includes U.S. Open Cup, FA Cup)		League cup (Note: Includes EFL Cup)		Continental		Other		Total	
Club	Season	Division	Apps	Goals	Apps	Goals	Apps	Goals	Apps	Goals	Apps	Goals	Apps	Goals
San Jose Earthquakes II	2022	MLS Next Pro	24	9	―		―		―		―		24	9
Columbus Crew	2023	Major League Soccer	12	2	3	0	―		―		2 (Note: One appearances in Leagues Cup, one appearance and one goal in MLS Cup playoffs)	1	17	3
Columbus Crew	2024	Major League Soccer	31	4	―		―		3 (Note: Appearances in CONCACAF Champions Cup)	0	6 (Note: Five appearances in Leagues Cup, one appearance and one goal in MLS Cup playoffs)	1	40	5
Columbus Crew	2025	Major League Soccer	29	4	―		―		2	0	4 (Note: Three appearances and two goals in Leagues Cup, one appearance and one goal in MLS Cup playoffs)	3	35	7
Columbus Crew	2026	Major League Soccer	17	4	1	1	―		―		―		18	5
Columbus Crew	Total		89	14	4	1	―		5	0	12	5	110	20
Columbus Crew 2 (loan)	2023	MLS Next Pro	1	0	―		―		―		―		1	0
Middlesbrough	2026–27	Championship	14	1	0	0	2	0	―		―		16	1
Career total			128	24	4	1	2	0	5	0	12	5	151	30

=== International ===
As of match played July 6, 2026

Appearances and goals by national team and year
National team	Year	Apps	Goals
United States	2025	16	1
United States	2026	5	0
Total		21	1

Scores and results list United States goal tally first.

List of international goals scored by Maximillian Arfsten
No.	Date	Venue	Opponent	Score	Result	Competition
1	June 29, 2025	U.S. Bank Stadium, Minneapolis, United States	Costa Rica	2–1	2–2 (4–3 p)	2025 CONCACAF Gold Cup

== Honors ==
Columbus Crew

- MLS Cup: 2023
- Leagues Cup: 2024
- CONCACAF Champions Cup runner-up: 2024

Individual

- MLS All-Star: 2025, 2026
