= Cesar Ruvalcaba =

American soccer player (born 2001)

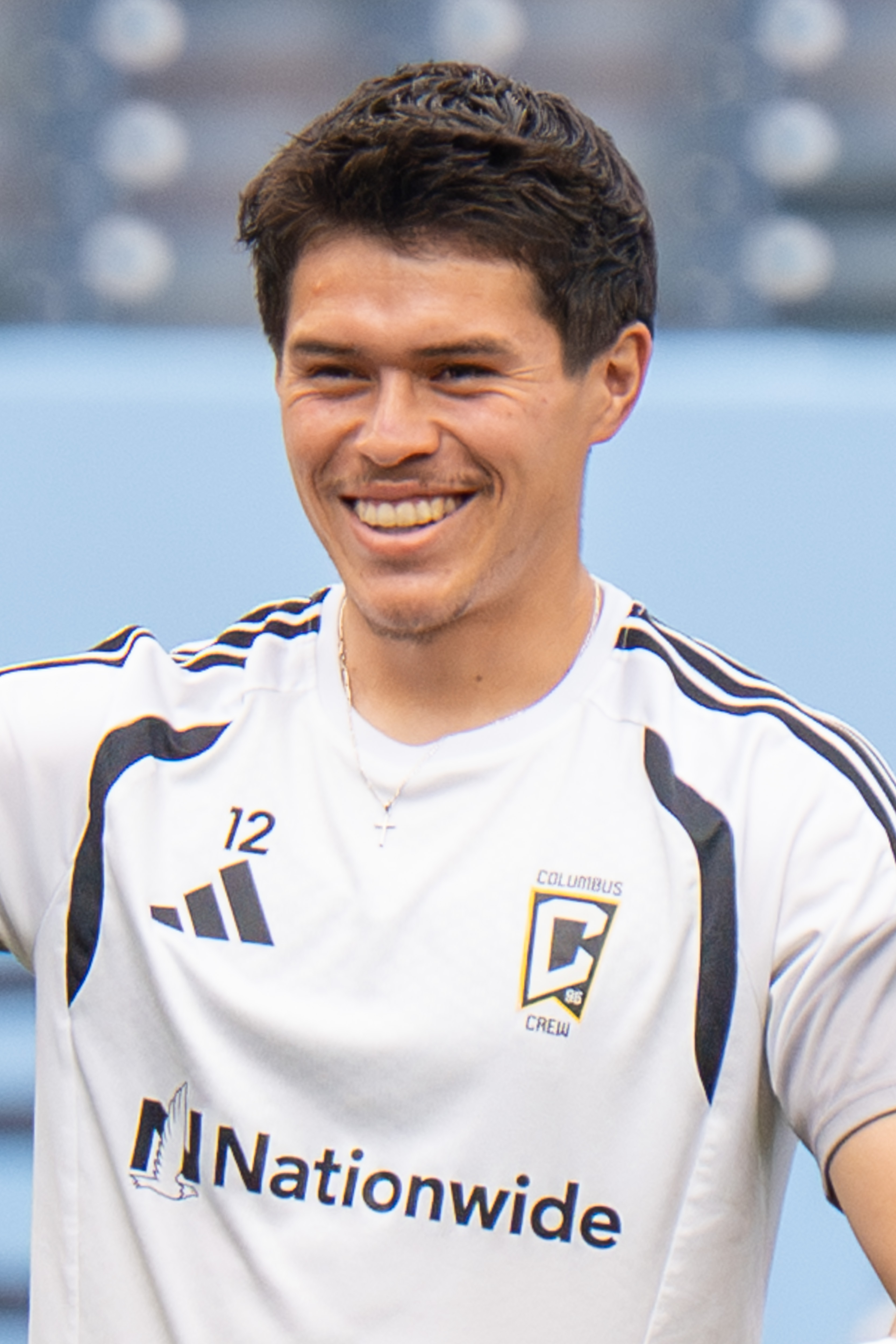
- Ruvalcaba with Columbus Crew in 2026

Personal information
- Full name: Cesar Alexander Ruvalcaba Perez
- Date of birth: July 13, 2001 (age 25)
- Place of birth: South Gate, California, United States
- Height: 6 ft 2 in (1.88 m)
- Position: Defender

Team information
- Current team: Columbus Crew
- Number: 12

Youth career
- 2016–2017: Downey FC United
- 2017–2019: Strikers FC

College career
Years	Team	Apps	(Gls)
2019–2023	Cal Poly Pomona Broncos	63	(3)
2024	SMU Mustangs	14	(4)

Senior career*
Years	Team	Apps	(Gls)
2022	Thunder Bay Chill	11	(0)
2023–2024	Redlands FC	15	(3)
2025–	Columbus Crew 2	8	(1)
2025	→ Columbus Crew (loan)	1	(0)
2025–	Columbus Crew	17	(1)
- * Club domestic league appearances and goals as of 04:31, 1 September 2026 (UTC)

Cesar Ruvalcaba Perez (born July 13, 2001) is an American professional soccer player who plays as a defender for Major League Soccer club Columbus Crew.

== Youth and college career ==
Ruvalcaba played soccer for Downey High School, while also playing club soccer for Downey FC United and Strikers FC. He began his college soccer career in 2019 at Cal Poly Pomona, though he did not make any appearances during his first two seasons. He made his debut in the 2021 season and became a mainstay in the Broncos’ defense, appearing in all but one game the rest of his time in California, making 62 starts in 63 appearances and recording three goals and seven assists across all competitions. Ruvalcaba was named team captain in both 2022 and 2023, and earned several individual honors, including three All-CCAA First Team selections, two United Soccer Coaches All-West Region nods, and back-to-back United Soccer Coaches First Team All-American honors. In 2023, he was named the CCAA Defender of the Year and led Cal Poly Pomona to an NCAA Division II Tournament appearance, scoring twice in a second-round win over Cal State Monterey Bay.

Following his graduation from Cal Poly Pomona, Ruvalcaba transferred to Southern Methodist University as a graduate student for the 2024 season. At SMU, he started all 14 matches he appeared in, scoring four goals and providing seven assists.

== Club career ==
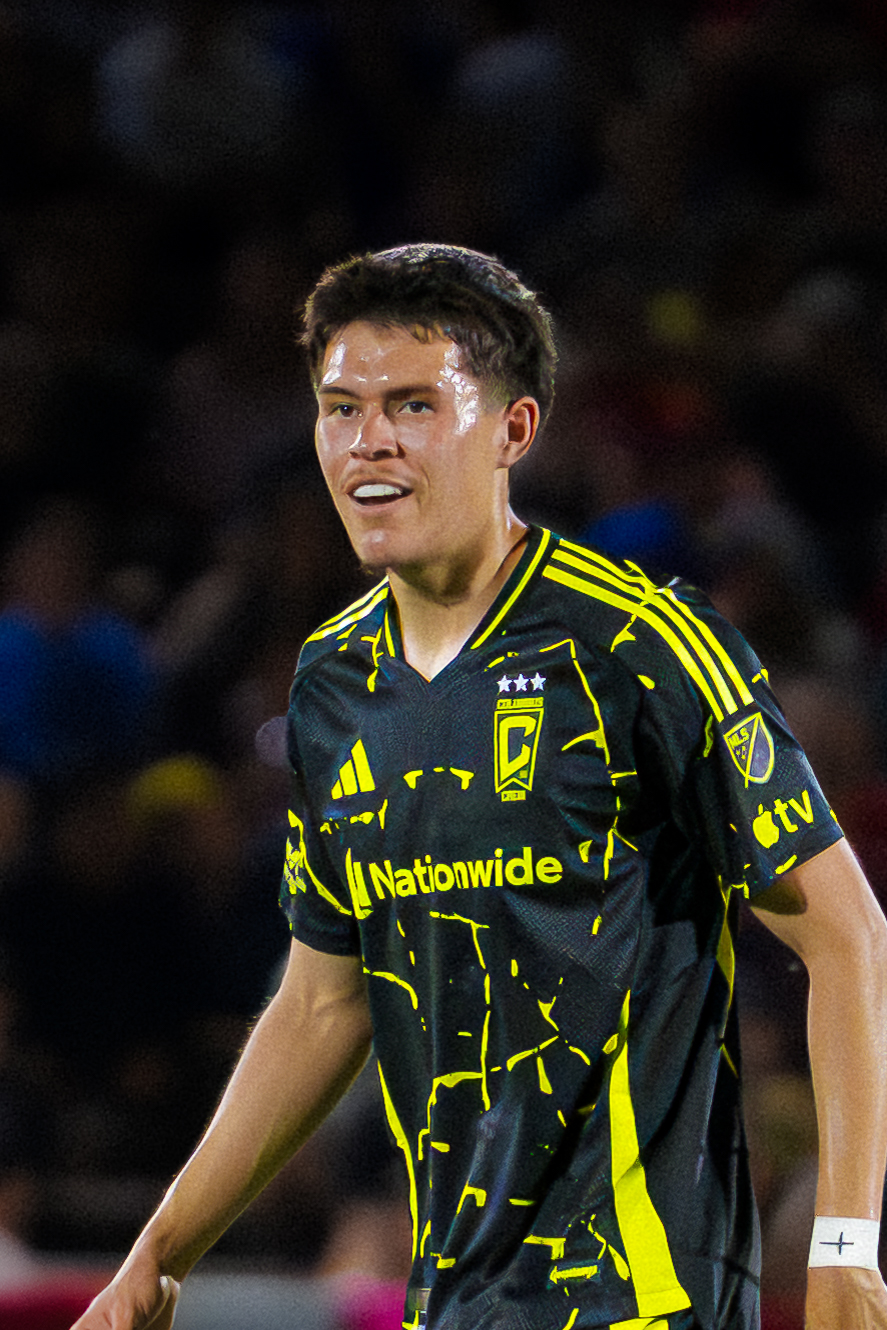
Ruvalcaba with Columbus Crew in 2026

After being drafted by the Columbus Crew in the 2nd round of the 2025 SuperDraft, Ruvalcaba signed with the second team on March 5, 2025. While on loan with the first team, Ruvalcaba made his Major League Soccer debut on March 22, starting in an eventual 0–0 tie versus New York City FC. He signed with the first team three days later, and started the following match in a 2–1 victory at D.C. United. On May 31, 2025, Ruvalcaba scored his first goal for the Columbus Crew, scoring the only goal for his side in a 5–1 loss against Inter Miami.

== Style of play ==
Ruvalcaba has been noted for his high work ethic.

== Career statistics ==
As of match played May 1, 2025

Appearances and goals by club, season and competition
Club	Season	League			National cup		Continental		Other		Total	
Club	Season	Division	Apps	Goals	Apps	Goals	Apps	Goals	Apps	Goals	Apps	Goals
Thunder Bay Chill	2022	USL League Two	11	0	—		—		—		11	0
Redlands FC	2023	USL League Two	6	1	—		—		—		6	1
Redlands FC	2024	USL League Two	9	2	—		—		—		9	2
Redlands FC	Total		15	3	0	0	0	0	0	0	15	3
Columbus Crew 2	2025	MLS Next Pro	1	0	0	0	—		0	0	1	0
Columbus Crew (loan)	2025	Major League Soccer	1	0	0	0	0	0	0	0	1	0
Columbus Crew	2025	Major League Soccer	3	0	0	0	0	0	0	0	3	0
Columbus Crew	Total		4	0	0	0	0	0	0	0	4	0
Career total			31	3	0	0	0	0	0	0	31	3
