= 2026 Columbus Crew season =

American professional soccer team

Columbus Crew
2026 season
- Investor-operators: Dee Haslam; Jimmy Haslam; JW Johnson; Whitney Johnson; Dr. Pete Edwards
- Head coach: Henrik Rydström (until May 17); Laurent Courtois (interim, from May 17)
- Stadium: ScottsMiracle-Gro Field
- Major League Soccer: Conference: TBD; Overall: TBD
- MLS Cup playoffs: TBD
- Leagues Cup: Quarterfinals
- U.S. Open Cup: Runners-up
Home colors	Away colors	Third colors

The 2026 Columbus Crew season is the club's 31st season of existence and their 31st consecutive season in Major League Soccer, the top flight of soccer in the United States and Canada. It was their first season under head coach Henrik Rydström.

This is Columbus' first season since 2019 without their former captain Darlington Nagbe, who retired at the end of the previous campaign.

== Current roster ==
As of September 3, 2026

Note: Flags indicate national team as defined under FIFA eligibility rules; some limited exceptions apply. Players may hold more than one non-FIFA nationality.

No.	Pos.	Nation	Player
1	GK	GUA	Nicholas Hagen
2	DF	ARG	Andrés Herrera
3	DF	CIV	Eric Bailly
4	DF	FRA	Rudy Camacho
7	MF	FRA	Dylan Chambost
8	FW	URU	Santiago Rodríguez (DP)
9	FW	PLE	Wessam Abou Ali (DP)
10	MF	ESP	Brais Méndez (DP)
11	DF	USA	Brooks Lennon
12	DF	USA	Cesar Ruvalcaba
14	MF	USA	Amar Sejdić
16	FW	USA	Taha Habroune (HG)
17	MF	GUI	Sekou Bangoura
18	DF	DEN	Malte Amundsen
19	FW	SEN	Jamal Thiaré
20	MF	POR	André Gomes

No.	Pos.	Nation	Player
22	MF	USA	Tristan Brown (HG)
23	DF	ALG	Mohamed Farsi
24	GK	USA	Evan Bush
25	DF	USA	Sean Zawadzki (captain; HG)
26	MF	ARG	Lautaro Giaccone (on loan from Argentinos Juniors)
28	GK	USA	Patrick Schulte
29	MF	PHI	Cole Mrowka (HG)
31	DF	CPV	Steven Moreira
33	FW	CHI	Gonzalo Tapia (on loan from São Paulo)
41	GK	BLR	Stanislav Lapkes (HG)
46	FW	USA	Chase Adams (HG)
50	MF	USA	Tarun Karumanchi
54	GK	USA	Luke Pruter
77	FW	VEN	Josef Martínez
—	MF	MAR	Anass Zaroury (on loan from Panathinaikos)

== Technical Staff ==
Position	Staff
Head coach (until 17 May)	Henrik Rydström
Assistant coach (until 17 May); Interim Head Coach (from 17 May)	Laurent Courtois
Assistant coach (until 17 May)	Theodor Olsson
Assistant coach	Josh Williams
Goalkeeping coach	Phil Boerger
First Team analyst (until 17 May)	Mak Pakhei
Head of video & data analysis	Marc O'Neill
Technical director	Marc Nicholls
Director of Player Development	Dan Lock
Crew 2 Head coach	Federico Higuaín
Academy Head coaches	U18: Chris Rogers; U16: Shahad Farahani; U15: Eddie Hertsenberg

Source: []

== Competitions ==
=== Overview ===
Competition	First match	Last match	Starting round	Final position	Record							
Competition	First match	Last match	Starting round	Final position	Pld	W	D	L	GF	GA	GD	Win %
Major League Soccer	February 21, 2026	November 7, 2026	Matchday 1	TBD	30	10	5	15	46	47	−1	33.33
Leagues Cup	August 4, 2026	TBD	League Phase	Quarterfinals	4	2	1	1	6	5	+1	50.00
U.S. Open Cup	April 15, 2026	October 21, 2026	Round of 32	Runners-up	5	4	1	0	10	2	+8	80.00
Total					39	16	7	16	62	54	+8	41.03

Last updated: October 21, 2026
Source: Competitions

=== Friendlies ===
July 12 Friendly	Columbus Crew (United States)	1–1	(England) Burnley	Columbus, Ohio
4:00 PM EDT	Daniel Gazdag 48'		Oluwaseun Adewumi 88'	Stadium: ScottsMiracle-Gro Field

=== Major League Soccer (MLS) ===
==== Standings ====
===== Eastern Conference =====
MLS Eastern Conference table (2026)
Pos	Team	Pld	W	L	T	GF	GA	GD	Pts	Qualification
5	Charlotte FC	34	15	10	9	66	51	+15	54	Qualification for round one
6	Philadelphia Union	34	14	12	8	66	52	+14	50	Qualification for round one
7	Columbus Crew	34	14	15	5	59	52	+7	47	Qualification for round one
8	Orlando City SC	34	13	14	7	63	78	−15	46	Qualification for the wild card round
9	FC Cincinnati	34	12	12	10	67	75	−8	46	Qualification for the wild card round

Source: MLS
Rules for classification: 1) points; 2) total wins; 3) total goal differential; 4) total goals scored; 5) fewer disciplinary points; 6) away goal differential; 7) away goals scored; 8) home goals differential; 9) home goals scored; 10) coin toss (2 clubs tied) or drawing of lots (≥3 clubs tied)

===== Overall table =====
Overall MLS standings table
Pos	Team	Pld	W	L	T	GF	GA	GD	Pts
10	Houston Dynamo FC	34	14	11	9	43	43	0	51
11	Philadelphia Union	34	14	12	8	66	52	+14	50
12	Columbus Crew	34	14	15	5	59	52	+7	47
13	Los Angeles FC	34	12	11	11	52	40	+12	47
14	Portland Timbers	34	13	14	7	62	61	+1	46

Source: MLS
Rules for classification: 1) points; 2) total wins; 3) total goal differential; 4) total goals scored; 5) fewer disciplinary points; 6) away goal differential; 7) away goals scored; 8) home goals differential; 9) home goals scored; 10) coin toss (2 clubs tied) or drawing of lots (≥3 clubs tied)

==== Results summary ====
Overall								Home						Away					
Pld	Pts	W	L	T	GF	GA	GD	W	L	T	GF	GA	GD	W	L	T	GF	GA	GD
34	47	14	15	5	57	54	+3	9	6	2	29	19	+10	5	9	3	28	35	−7

Last updated: Complete
Source: MLS Results
Pld = Matches played; Pts = Points; W = Matches won; T = Matches tied; L = Matches lost; GF = Goals for; GA = Goals against; GD = Goal difference

==== Results by round ====
Round	1	2	3	4	5	6	7	8	9	10	11	12	13	14	15	16	17	18	19	20	21	22	23	24	25	26	27	28	29	30	31	32	33	34
Stadium	A	A	H	H	A	A	H	A	H	H	H	A	A	A	H	H	H	A	A	H	A	H	H	A	H	A	H	A	H	A	H	A	H	A
Result	L	D	D	L	L	W	D	L	W	W	L	L	L	D	W	L	W	D	L	L	L	L	W	L	L	W	W	L	W	W	W	W	W	W

Source: Match reports
Columbus schedule
A = Away; H = Home; N = Neutral; W = Win; D = Draw; L = Loss

==== Match results ====
Win Draw Loss

February 21 1	Portland Timbers	3–2	Columbus Crew	Portland, Oregon
10:30 PM EST	Mora 14'; Antony 20'; Bye (yellow card) 29'; Lassiter 88'	Report	Abou Ali 6', (yellow card) 58'; Rossi 44'	Stadium: Providence Park; Attendance: 22,210; Referee: Allen Chapman; Assistant referees: Kevin Lock; Diego Blas; Fourth official: Brandon Stevis

February 28 2	Sporting Kansas City	2–2	Columbus Crew	Kansas City, Kansas
8:30 PM EST	Bartlett (yellow card) 44'; Joveljić 48', 72'	Report	Herrera (yellow card) 15'; Abou Ali 33'; Zawadzki (yellow card) 79'; Rossi 82'	Stadium: Sporting Park; Attendance: 18,522; Referee: Sergii Demianchuk; Assistant referees: Cory Richardson; Jose Da Silva; Fourth official: Corbyn May

March 7 3	Columbus Crew	0–0	Chicago Fire FC	Columbus, Ohio
7:30 PM EST	Arfsten (yellow card) 14'; Zawadzki (yellow card) 87'	Report	Waterman (yellow card) 61'; Zinckernagel (yellow card) 77'; Salétros (yellow card) 83'; Bamba (yellow card) 90'	Stadium: ScottsMiracle-Gro Field; Attendance: 20,121; Referee: Tori Penso; Assistant referees: Kathryn Nesbitt; Meghan Mullen; Fourth official: Calin Radosav

March 14 4	Columbus Crew	0–1	Nashville SC	Columbus, Ohio
6:15 PM EDT	Amundsen (yellow card) 51'	Report	Maher (yellow card) 10'; Qasem (yellow card) 41'; Pacius (yellow card) 42'; Bauer (yellow card) 72'; Nájar (yellow card) 87'; Mukhtar 90+4'	Stadium: ScottsMiracle-Gro Field; Attendance: 19,960; Referee: Fotis Bazakos; Assistant referees: Brian Dunn; Justin Howard; Fourth official: Elvis Osmanovic

March 21 5	Toronto FC	2–1	Columbus Crew	Toronto, Ontario
1:00 PM EDT	Cifuentes 56'; Zimmerman 83', (yellow card) 87'	Report	Abou Ali 4'; Herrera (yellow card) 7'; Chambost (yellow card) 45'; Thiaré (yellow card) 90+8'	Stadium: BMO Field; Attendance: 15,384; Referee: Pierre-Luc Lauziere; Assistant referees: Gerard-Kader Lebuis; Gianni Facchini; Fourth official: Guido Gonzales Jr.

April 4 6	Atlanta United FC	1–3	Columbus Crew	Atlanta, Georgia
7:30 PM EDT	Miranchuk 60'; Mihaj (yellow card) 90'; Báez (yellow card) 90+2'	Report	Abou Ali 48', 53'; Arfsten 61'; Chambost (yellow card) 90+4'	Stadium: Mercedes-Benz Stadium; Attendance: 34,130; Referee: Lorenzo Hernandez; Assistant referees: Eric Weisbrod; Nick Balcer; Fourth official: Elijio Arreguin

April 12 7	Columbus Crew	1–1	Orlando City	Columbus, Ohio
7:00 PM EDT	Moreira (yellow card) 55'; Rossi 80'	Report	Pašalić 14', (yellow card) 86'; Iago (yellow card) 41'; Brekalo (yellow card) 43'; Marín (yellow card) 82'	Stadium: ScottsMiracle-Gro Field; Attendance: 19,834; Referee: Ricardo Montero; Assistant referees: Andrew Bigelow; Tyler Wyrostek; Fourth official: Marcos de Oliveira

April 18 8	New England Revolution	2–1	Columbus Crew	Foxborough, Massachusetts
7:30 PM EDT	Turgeman 54'; Turner (yellow card) 71'; Gil 85' (pen.)	Report	Arfsten 25', (yellow card) 87'; Gomes (yellow card) 70'; Camacho (yellow card) 90+6'	Stadium: Gillette Stadium; Attendance: 16,257; Referee: Timothy Ford; Assistant referees: Chris Wattam; Mike Nickerson; Fourth official: Guido Gonzales Jr.

April 22 9	Columbus Crew	2–1	LA Galaxy	Columbus, Ohio
7:30 PM EDT	Gazdag 40'; Rossi 47'	Report	Pec (yellow card) 45+5', (goal) 86'	Stadium: ScottsMiracle-Gro Field; Attendance: 19,049; Referee: Marcos de Oliveira; Assistant referees: Adam Wienckowski; Brian Marshall; Fourth official: Tori Penso

April 25 10	Columbus Crew	2–0	Philadelphia Union	Columbus, Ohio
7:30 PM EDT	Arfsten 4'; Bangoura (yellow card) 45'; Harriel 45+3' (o.g.)	Report	Jean Jacques (yellow card) 39'; Sery Larsen (red card) 90+5'	Stadium: ScottsMiracle-Gro Field; Attendance: 19,903; Referee: Filip Dujic; Assistant referees: Jeremy Kieso; Matthew Rodman; Fourth official: Sergii Demianchuk

May 2 11	Columbus Crew	2–3	Minnesota United FC	Columbus, Ohio
7:30 PM EDT	Arfsten (yellow card) 12'; Habroune 31'; Picard 56'; Camacho (yellow card) 72'	Report	Duncan (yellow card) 24'; Yeboah 59', 66'; Markanich 74'; Díaz (yellow card) 84'	Stadium: ScottsMiracle-Gro Field; Attendance: 18,904; Referee: Sergii Boiko; Assistant referees: Kyle Atkins; Rhett Hammil; Fourth official: Rodrigo Albuquerque

May 10 12	New York City FC	3–0	Columbus Crew	New York, New York
4:30 PM EDT	Wolf 12', 16', 66'	Report	Habroune (yellow card) 63'	Stadium: Yankee Stadium; Attendance: 17,770; Referee: Rubiel Vazquez; Assistant referees: Nick Uranga; Jose Da Silva; Fourth official: Atahan Yaya

May 13 13	New York Red Bulls	3–2	Columbus Crew	Harrison, New Jersey
7:30 PM EDT	Hall 7', 40', 79'; Ruvalcaba (yellow card) 68'; Valencia (yellow card) 83'; Mosquera (yellow card) 90+7'	Report	Arfsten 22'; Habroune (yellow card) 45+3'; Rossi 64' (pen.); Camacho (yellow card) 71'	Stadium: Sports Illustrated Stadium; Attendance: 14,116; Referee: Pierre-Luc Lauziere; Assistant referees: Brian Dunn; Eduardo Jeff; Fourth official: Luis Diego Arroyo

May 16 14	Philadelphia Union	1–1	Columbus Crew	Chester, Pennsylvania
7:30 PM EDT	Bender (yellow card) 9'; Iloski (yellow card) 26', (goal) 70'; Makhanya (yellow card) 45+1'	Report	Picard 10'; Camacho (yellow card) 30'	Stadium: Subaru Park; Attendance: 17,505; Referee: Armando Villarreal; Assistant referees: Ryan Graves; Diego Blas; Fourth official: Ricardo Montero

May 24 15	Columbus Crew	2–0	Atlanta United FC	Columbus, Ohio
5:00 PM EDT	Zawadzki (yellow card) 23'; Bangoura 24', (yellow card) 64'; Rossi 45+2'; Camacho (yellow card) 90+4'	Report	Báez (yellow card) 50'; Mihaj (yellow card) 90+3'; Muyumba (yellow card) 90+4'	Stadium: ScottsMiracle-Gro Field; Attendance: 19,782; Referee: Chris Penso; Assistant referees: Cameron Blanchard; Jeremy Hanson; Fourth official: Ricardo Montero

July 22 16	Columbus Crew	1–2	New York City FC	Columbus, Ohio
7:30 PM EDT	Thiaré (yellow card) 57'; Arfsten (yellow card) 60'; Habroune (yellow card) 82'; Gazdag 90+3'	Report	Fernández 28'; Gray (yellow card) 40'; Ojeda 70'; Sands (yellow card) 90+5'	Stadium: ScottsMiracle-Gro Field; Attendance: 20,036; Referee: Lorenzo Hernandez; Assistant referees: Meghan Mullen; Kevin Lock; Fourth official: Lukasz Szpala

July 25 17	Columbus Crew	2–1	FC Cincinnati	Columbus, Ohio
7:15 PM EDT	Thiaré 41'; Gazdag 45+6' (pen.)	Report	Denkey 9'; Miazga (yellow card) 66'; Valenzuela (red card) 90+4'	Stadium: ScottsMiracle-Gro Field; Attendance: 20,307; Referee: Allen Chapman; Assistant referees: Andrew Bigelow; Jeffrey Swartzel; Fourth official: Chris Penso

August 1 18	Inter Miami CF	2–2	Columbus Crew	Miami, Florida
7:30 PM EDT	Suárez 16'; Allen 45+5'; Casemiro (yellow card) 82'	Report	Casemiro 34' (o.g.); Bangoura (yellow card) 74'; Méndez 84'; Schulte (yellow card) 90+5'	Stadium: Nu Stadium; Attendance: 25,922; Referee: Tori Penso; Assistant referees: Brooke Mayo; Corey Rockwell; Fourth official: Marcos de Oliveira

August 15 19	Charlotte FC	3–1	Columbus Crew	Charlotte, North Carolina
7:30 PM EDT	Bronico 1'; Abada 9' (pen.); Schnegg (yellow card) 39'; Kessler (yellow card) 60'; Biel 73'; Westwood (yellow card) 89'	Report	Adams (yellow card) 89'	Stadium: Bank of America Stadium; Attendance: 25,470; Referee: Filip Dujic; Assistant referees: Adam Wienckowski; Ben Pilgrim; Fourth official: Ricardo Montero

August 19 20	Columbus Crew	1–2	CF Montréal	Columbus, Ohio
7:30 PM EDT	Camacho (yellow card) 3'; Gillier 20' (o.g.); Gomes (yellow card) 34'	Report	Owusu 5'; Vera (yellow card) 14'; Neal (yellow card) 48'; Ceballos (yellow card) 74'; Streit 78'; Longstaff (yellow card) 89'	Stadium: ScottsMiracle-Gro Field; Attendance: 17,039; Referee: Malik Badawi; Assistant referees: Nick Uranga; Mike Nickerson; Fourth official: Sergii Demianchuk

August 22 21	Nashville SC	3–2	Columbus Crew	Nashville, Tennessee
8:30 PM EDT	Mukhtar 27'; Lovitz (yellow card) 39'; Baker-Whiting 90+3'; Najar 90+5'	Report	Ruvalcaba (yellow card) 49'; Farsi 58'; Gomes 68'	Stadium: Geodis Park; Attendance: 25,173; Referee: Victor Rivas; Assistant referees: Corey Parker; Gianni Facchini; Fourth official: Allen Chapman

August 30 22	Columbus Crew	1–3	New England Revolution	Columbus, Ohio
7:30 PM EDT	Méndez 8'; Karumanchi (yellow card) 25'	Report	Polster 32'; Turgeman 41'; Yusuf (yellow card) 78'; Gil 79'	Stadium: ScottsMiracle-Gro Field; Attendance: 18,105; Referee: Jon Freemon; Assistant referees: Jeffrey Greeson; Jeffrey Swartzel; Fourth official: Natalie Simon

September 5 23	Columbus Crew	3–0	Colorado Rapids	Columbus, Ohio
7:30 PM EDT	Rodríguez 22', (yellow card) 45'; Karumanchi (yellow card) 54'; Lennon (yellow card) 71'; Tapia 81'; Habroune 90+4'; Schulte (yellow card) 90+9'	Report		Stadium: ScottsMiracle-Gro Field; Attendance: 19,144; Referee: Alexis Da Silva; Assistant referees: Jeremy Kieso; Diego Blas; Fourth official: Alejo Calume

September 9 24	D.C. United	2–1	Columbus Crew	Washington, D.C.
7:30 PM EDT	Peglow (yellow card) 19'; Baribo 24', 37'; Rowles (yellow card) 57'; Johnson (yellow card) 90+5'	Report	Karumanchi (yellow card) 12'; Ruvalcaba (yellow card) 19'; Rodríguez 49'	Stadium: Audi Field; Attendance: 10,115; Referee: Muhammad Kaleia; Assistant referees: Kyle Atkins; Cory Richardson; Fourth official: Guido Gonzales Jr.

September 12 25	Columbus Crew	0–1	New York Red Bulls	Columbus, Ohio
7:30 PM EDT	Rodríguez (yellow card) 70'; Moreira (yellow card) 90+2'	Report	Donkor (yellow card) 69', (goal) 89'; Sofo (yellow card) 73'	Stadium: ScottsMiracle-Gro Field; Attendance: 17,448; Referee: Ramy Touchan; Assistant referees: Jason White; Nick Balcer; Fourth official: Tori Penso

September 19 26	CF Montréal	0–2	Columbus Crew	Montreal, Quebec
7:30 PM EDT	Ceballos (yellow card) 2'; Piette (yellow card) 84'	Report	Moreira (yellow card) 32'; Farsi 57'; Méndez 68'	Stadium: Saputo Stadium; Attendance: 14,696; Referee: Fotis Bazakos; Assistant referees: Ian McKay; Ben Pilgrim; Fourth official: Pierre-Luc Lauziere

September 27 27	Columbus Crew	2–1	Inter Miami CF	Columbus, Ohio
7:00 PM EDT	Martínez 28' (pen.); Chambost (yellow card) 38'; Méndez (yellow card) 75'; Bailly (yellow card) 78'; Bangoura (yellow card) 83'; Thiaré 90+8'	Report	Casemiro (yellow card) 27'; Messi 33'; Micael (yellow card) 67'; Pintér (yellow card) 80'; Luján (yellow card) 90+2'; Morales (yellow card) 90+4' (red card) 90+6'; Barraza (yellow card) 90+10'	Stadium: ScottsMiracle-Gro Field; Attendance: 21,188; Referee: Victor Rivas; Assistant referees: Corey Parker; Rhett Hammil; Fourth official: Ricardo Montero

October 10 28	Orlando City SC	3–2	Columbus Crew	Orlando, Florida
7:30 PM EDT	Sarajian 1'; Nogueira (yellow card) 3'; Griezmann 16'; Jansson (yellow card) 24'; Brekalo (yellow card) 42'; Pašalić (yellow card) 59'; Angulo 89'	Report	Habroune 8', (yellow card) 22'; Méndez (yellow card) 36', (goal) 53'	Stadium: Inter.co Stadium; Attendance: 20,018; Referee: Rosendo Mendoza; Assistant referees: Jason White; Kevin Klinger; Fourth official: Alejo Calume

October 14 29	Columbus Crew	3–1	Charlotte FC	Columbus, Ohio
7:30 PM EDT	Méndez 28'; Zaroury 63'; Habroune 65'; Amundsen (yellow card) 69'; Schulte (yellow card) 72'	Report	Toklomati 17'	Stadium: ScottsMiracle-Gro Field; Attendance: 18,607; Referee: Timothy Ford; Assistant referees: Andrew Bigelow; Jeffrey Swartzel; Fourth official: Fotis Bazakos

October 18 30	FC Cincinnati	0–2	Columbus Crew	Cincinnati, Ohio
7:00 PM EDT	Gidi (yellow card) 28'; Hadebe (yellow card) 31'	Report	Tapia 22'; Gomes (yellow card) 45+7'; Habroune 54'; Chambost (yellow card) 90+3'	Stadium: TQL Stadium; Attendance: 25,513; Referee: Drew Fischer; Assistant referees: Cameron Blanchard; Brian Dunn; Fourth official: Filip Dujic

October 24 31	Columbus Crew	4–2	Toronto FC	Columbus, Ohio
2:30 PM EDT	Tapia 16'; Amundsen 21', 48'; Bangoura (yellow card) 32' (red card) 70'; Lennon 59'	Report	Sallói 69'; Sargent 81'	Stadium: ScottsMiracle-Gro Field; Attendance: 19,487; Referee: Chris Penso; Assistant referees: Stefan Tanaka-Freundt; Gianni Facchini; Fourth official: Pierre-Luc Lauziere

October 28 32	FC Dallas	0–2	Columbus Crew	Frisco, Texas
8:30 PM EDT	Norris (yellow card) 16'; Moore (yellow card) 31'; Cappis (yellow card) 83'; Johansson (yellow card) 87'	Report	Tapia 18'; Rodríguez 70'; Herrera (yellow card) 90+6'	Stadium: Toyota Stadium; Attendance: 10,925; Referee: Sergii Demianchuk; Assistant referees: Corey Parker; Justin Parker; Fourth official: Malik Badawi

October 31 33	Columbus Crew	3–0	D.C. United	Columbus, Ohio
2:00 PM EDT	Zawadzki 16'; Zaroury 41'; Nono 60' (o.g.)	Report	Kurokawa (penalty missed) 24'; Rowles (yellow card) 45+1'; Peglow (yellow card) 64'	Stadium: ScottsMiracle-Gro Field; Attendance: 20,024; Referee: Elijio Arreguin; Assistant referees: Logan Brown; Jose Da Silva; Fourth official: Deny Kulasinac

November 7 34	Chicago Fire FC	3–4	Columbus Crew	Bridgeview, Illinois
4:00 PM EST	Lewandowski 8' (pen.), 22' (pen.); Allen (yellow card) 11'; Mbokazi (yellow card) 27'; Haile-Selassie 45+4'; Bamba (yellow card) 53'; Mekvabishvili (yellow card) 74'	Report	Tapia 16', 62', (yellow card) 62'; Zaroury 23'; Rodríguez (yellow card) 79'; Méndez 90+3'	Stadium: SeatGeek Stadium; Attendance: 19,419; Referee: Rosendo Mendoza; Assistant referees: Cory Richardson; Mike Nickerson; Fourth official: Igor Bych

=== MLS Cup playoffs ===
November 21 Round one match 1	Inter Miami CF	0–3	Columbus Crew	Miami, Florida
6:00 PM EST	Luján (yellow card) 13' (yellow-red card) 36'; Messi (yellow card) 45+4'; Bright (yellow card) 45+5'; Fray (yellow card) 66'	Report	Tapia 9' (pen.), 58', (yellow card) 45+4'; Chambost (yellow card) 43'; Habroune 52'; Martínez (yellow card) 81'	Stadium: Nu Stadium; Referee: Allen Chapman

November 27 Round one match 2	Columbus Crew	v	Inter Miami CF	Columbus, Ohio
8:00 PM EST				Stadium: ScottsMiracle-Gro Field

December 2 Round one match 3	Inter Miami CF	v	Columbus Crew	Miami, Florida
EST				Stadium: Nu Stadium

=== U.S. Open Cup ===
The Columbus Crew is participating in the 2026 U.S. Open Cup, having missed out on qualifying for the 2026 CONCACAF Champions Cup. They started in the round of 32, and their opponent was determined in a draw on April 2.

April 15 Round of 32	Richmond Kickers (Virginia)	0–3	(Ohio) Columbus Crew	Richmond, Virginia
7:30 PM EDT	Barnathan (yellow card) 61'	Report	Picard 41', 63'; Thiaré 73'	Stadium: City Stadium; Attendance: 5,046; Referee: Deny Kulasinac

April 29 Round of 16	Columbus Crew (Ohio)	4–1	(Tennessee) One Knoxville SC	Columbus, Ohio
7:30 PM EDT	Picard 10', 23'; Gazdag 72'; Adams 77'	Report	Rodrigues 11'; Gøling (yellow card) 37'	Stadium: ScottsMiracle-Gro Field; Referee: Nabil Bensalah

May 20 Quarterfinals	Columbus Crew (Ohio)	1–0	(New York (state)) New York City FC	Columbus, Ohio
7:30 PM EDT	Arfsten 59'	Report	Farnós (yellow card) 78'	Stadium: ScottsMiracle-Gro Field; Referee: Marcos de Oliveira

September 16 Semifinals	Columbus Crew (Ohio)	2–1	(Florida) Orlando City SC	Columbus, Ohio
7:00 PM EDT	Martínez 9'; Habroune (yellow card) 48'; Méndez 52'	Report	M. Ojeda 40'; Cartagena (yellow card) 75'	Stadium: ScottsMiracle-Gro Field; Referee: Joe Dickerson

October 21 Final	Columbus Crew (Ohio)	0–0 (a.e.t.) (3–5 p)	(Missouri) St. Louis City SC	Columbus, Ohio
8:00 PM EDT	Rodríguez (yellow card) 82'; Bailly (yellow card) 119'	Report	Holse (yellow card) 90+10'; Edelman (yellow card) 90+12'; Totland (yellow card) 104'	Stadium: ScottsMiracle-Gro Field; Attendance: 20,250; Referee: Guido Gonzales Jr.
	Penalties
	Rodríguez (penalty missed); Amundsen (penalty scored); Tapia (penalty scored); Herrera (penalty scored)		(penalty scored) Baumgartl; (penalty scored) MacNaughton; (penalty scored) Durkin; (penalty scored) Downs; (penalty scored) Edelman

=== Leagues Cup ===
By qualifying for the 2025 MLS Cup playoffs, the Columbus Crew also qualified for the 2026 Leagues Cup, which was confirmed on December 16, 2025. The format will remain the same as the 2025 edition, with Columbus playing three matches during the League Phase, all against teams from Liga MX.

August 4 1	Columbus Crew (United States)	3–1	(Mexico) Atlas	Columbus, Ohio
7:45 p.m. EDT	Ruvalcaba 28'; Adams (yellow card) 33'; Zawadzki 45+2'; Méndez 51'; Karumanchi (yellow card) 55'	Report	Schlegel (yellow card) 61'; Zawadzki 67' (o.g.)	Stadium: ScottsMiracle-Gro Field; Attendance: 9,528; Referee: Marco Ortiz

August 7 2	Columbus Crew (United States)	2–1	(Mexico) Pachuca	Columbus, Ohio
7:30 p.m. EDT	Méndez 19'; Amundsen (yellow card) 36'; Gazdag 45+2'; Ruvalcaba (yellow card) 65'; Gomes (yellow card) 81'	Report	Barreto (yellow card) 15' (yellow-red card) 74'; Idrissi 72'; Moreno (yellow card) 90+5'	Stadium: ScottsMiracle-Gro Field; Attendance: 19,443; Referee: Filip Dujic

August 11 3	Columbus Crew (United States)	1–1 (3–2 p)	(Mexico) UNAM	Columbus, Ohio
7:30 p.m. EDT	Karumanchi 9'; Camacho (yellow card) 60'	Report	Carrasquilla (yellow card) 12'; Angulo (yellow card) 37', (goal) 45'; Herrera (red card) 72'; Duarte (yellow card) 76'; Azuaje (yellow card) 90+1'; Vite (yellow card) 90+8'	Stadium: ScottsMiracle-Gro Field; Attendance: 9,100; Referee: Selvin Brown
	Penalties
	Adams (penalty scored); Habroune (penalty missed); Giaccone (penalty scored); Camacho (penalty scored)		(penalty scored) Navas; (penalty missed) Martínez; (penalty scored) Vite; (penalty missed) López; (penalty missed) Silva

August 26 Quarterfinals	América (Mexico)	2–0	(United States) Columbus Crew	Carson, California
10:45 p.m. EDT	R. Veiga 11'; B. Rodríguez 45+6'; Perea (yellow card) 85'	Report		Stadium: Dignity Health Sports Park; Attendance: 20,637; Referee: Marco Ortiz

== Transfers ==
=== In ===
Pos.	Player	Transferred from	Fee/notes	Date	Sources
MF	(Guinea) Sekou Bangoura	(Israel) Kiryat Shmona	Transfer, undisclosed fee; Contract through 2029 with an option for 2030	January 6, 2026	
FW	(United States) Chase Adams	(United States) Columbus Crew 2	Homegrown player, contract through 2029 with an option for 2030	January 8, 2026	
DF	(United States) Quinton Elliot	(United States) Columbus Crew 2	Homegrown player, contract through 2026 with options for 2027, 2028, and 2029	January 8, 2026	
DF	(United States) Owen Presthus	(United States) Columbus Crew 2	Homegrown player, contract through 2027 with an option for 2028	January 8, 2026	
GK	(United States) Luke Pruter	(United States) Columbus Crew 2	2024 MLS SuperDraft pick; contract through 2026 with options for 2027 and 2028	January 9, 2026	
MF	(United States) Zach Zengue	(United States) Columbus Crew 2	2024 MLS SuperDraft pick; contract through 2026 with options for 2027, 2028, and 2029	January 9, 2026	
FW	(Senegal) Jamal Thiaré	(United States) Atlanta United FC		February 2, 2026	
MF	(Portugal) André Gomes	(France) Lille		February 19, 2026	
DF	(United States) Brooks Lennon	(United States) Atlanta United FC		June 9, 2026	
MF	(Spain) Brais Méndez	(Spain) Real Sociedad		July 2, 2026	
DF	(Ivory Coast) Eric Bailly	(Spain) Real Oviedo		July 7, 2026	
MF	(Uruguay) Santiago Rodriguez	(Brazil) Botafogo		July 7, 2026	

=== Loan in ===
Pos.	Player	Parent club	Length/Notes	Beginning	End	Source
MF	(Argentina) Lautaro Giaccone	(Argentina) Argentinos Juniors		June 29, 2026		
FW	(Chile) Gonzalo Tapia	(Brazil) São Paulo FC		August 5, 2026		
MF	(Morocco) Anass Zaroury	(Greece) Panathinaikos		September 3, 2026		

=== Out ===
Pos.	Player	Transferred to	Fee/notes	Date	Source
MF	(United States) Darlington Nagbe	Retired	Contract expired	November 26, 2025	
GK	(Mexico) Abraham Romero	(United States) El Paso Locomotive FC	Contract expired	November 26, 2025	
DF	(Finland) Lassi Lappalainen	(Finland) HJK	Option declined	November 26, 2025	
MF	(United States) Derrick Jones		Option declined	November 26, 2025	
