= Sekou Bangoura =

Sekou Bangoura may refer to:

- Sekou Bangoura (tennis) (born 1991), American tennis player
- Sekou Bangoura (footballer) (born 2002), Guinean footballer
