= 2021–22 Royal Charleroi SC season =

Charleroi
2021–22 season
- Owner: Fabien Debecq
- Managing director: Mehdi Bayat
- Head coach: Edward Still
- Stadium: Stade du Pays de Charleroi
- First Division A: 6th
- Belgian Cup: Sixth round
- Top goalscorer: League: Vakoun Issouf Bayo (11); All: Vakoun Issouf Bayo (11)
- Biggest win: Charleroi 5–0 Cercle Brugge
- Biggest defeat: Union Saint-Gilloise 4–0 Charleroi; Anderlecht 4–0 Charleroi
Home colours	Away colours	Third colours

The 2021–22 season was the 118th season in the existence of Royal Charleroi S.C. and the club's 10th consecutive season in the top flight of Belgian football. In addition to the domestic league, R. Charleroi S.C. participated in this season's edition of the Belgian Cup.

== Players ==
=== First-team squad ===
Note: Flags indicate national team as defined under FIFA eligibility rules; some limited exceptions apply. Players may hold more than one non-FIFA nationality.

No.	Pos.	Nation	Player
1	GK	SEN	Bingourou Kamara (on loan from Strasbourg)
3	DF	SUI	Stefan Knezevic
4	DF	BEL	Jules Van Cleemput
5	DF	TOG	Loïc Bessilé
6	MF	ALG	Adem Zorgane
7	MF	FRA	Karim Zedadka (on loan from Napoli)
8	MF	IRI	Ali Gholizadeh
9	FW	CIV	Vakoun Issouf Bayo (on loan from Gent)
10	FW	SEN	Youssouph Badji (on loan from Club Brugge)
12	DF	BEL	Joris Kayembe
13	GK	FRA	Didier Desprez
14	FW	LTU	Nauris Petkevičius
15	FW	BEL	Anthony Descotte
16	GK	BFA	Hervé Koffi
17	FW	BEL	Isaac Mbenza

No.	Pos.	Nation	Player
18	MF	BEL	Daan Heymans (on loan from Venezia)
19	DF	CIV	Benjamin Karamoko
21	DF	CYP	Stelios Andreou
23	DF	FRA	Steeven Willems
25	DF	NGR	Valentine Ozornwafor (on loan from Galatasaray)
26	MF	MAD	Marco Ilaimaharitra
28	FW	BEL	Ken Nkuba
29	DF	BEL	Reda Akbib
31	DF	BEL	Martin Wasinski
32	DF	BEL	Mehdi Boukamir
38	MF	BEL	Jackson Tchatchoua
39	MF	BEL	Kilian Lokembo
40	GK	BEL	Matteo Chiacig
44	MF	JPN	Ryota Morioka (captain)
70	FW	BEL	Anass Zaroury

=== On loan ===
Note: Flags indicate national team as defined under FIFA eligibility rules; some limited exceptions apply. Players may hold more than one non-FIFA nationality.

No.	Pos.	Nation	Player
2	DF	BUL	Ivan Goranov (at Levski Sofia until 30 June 2022)
—	DF	BEL	Levi Malungu (at MVV until 30 June 2022)
17	MF	BRA	Lucas Ribeiro Costa (at Waasland-Beveren until 30 June 2022)

No.	Pos.	Nation	Player
19	MF	CIV	Aboubakar Keita (at RWDM47 until 30 June 2022)
20	MF	CIV	Jean Thierry Lazare (at Union SG until 30 June 2022)
70	MF	IRI	Younes Delfi (at Gorica until 30 June 2022)

== Transfers ==
=== Loans in ===
No.	Pos	Player	Loaned from	Fee	Date	On loan until	Source
		(Ivory Coast) Vakoun Issouf Bayo					

== Pre-season and friendlies ==
Win Draw Loss

7 July 2021 Friendly	Charleroi (Belgium)	3–3	(France) Amiens	Belgium
18:00 CEST (UTC+2)

10 July 2021 Friendly	Zulte Waregem (Belgium)	3–2	(Belgium) Charleroi	Belgium
15:00 CEST (UTC+2)

14 July 2021 Friendly	Charleroi (Belgium)	2–2	(Belgium) RWD Molenbeek	Belgium
16:00 CEST (UTC+2)

17 July 2021 Friendly	Charleroi (Belgium)	0–2	(Greece) PAOK	Belgium
13:00 CEST (UTC+2)

18 August 2021 Friendly	Olympic Charleroi (Belgium)	0–2	(Belgium) Charleroi	Charleroi, Belgium
19:00 CEST (UTC+2)		Report		Stadium: Stade de la Neuville

9 January 2022 Friendly	UTA Arad (Romania)	1–4	(Belgium) Charleroi	Belek, Turkey
11:00 TRT (UTC+3)		Report		Stadium: Titanic Sports Center - Field 1

== Competitions ==
=== Overall record ===
Competition	First match	Last match	Starting round	Final position	Record							
Competition	First match	Last match	Starting round	Final position	Pld	W	D	L	GF	GA	GD	Win %
First Division A	24 July 2021	21 May 2022	Matchday 1	6th	40	17	10	13	65	58	+7	42.50
Belgian Cup	27 October 2021		Sixth round	Sixth round	1	0	1	0	0	0	+0	0.00
Total					41	17	11	13	65	58	+7	41.46

Source: Soccerway

=== First Division A ===
==== League table ====
Pos	Team	Pld	W	D	L	GF	GA	GD	Pts	Qualification or relegation
4	Antwerp	34	19	6	9	55	38	+17	63	Qualification for the Play-offs I
5	Gent	34	18	8	8	56	30	+26	62	Qualification for the Play-offs II
6	Charleroi	34	15	9	10	55	46	+9	54	Qualification for the Play-offs II
7	Mechelen	34	15	7	12	57	61	−4	52	Qualification for the Play-offs II
8	Genk	34	15	6	13	66	47	+19	51	Qualification for the Play-offs II

Source: Jupiler Pro League (in Dutch), Soccerway
Rules for classification: 1) Points; 2) Matches won; 3) Goal difference; 4) Goals scored; 5) Away matches won; 6) Away goal difference; 7) Away goals scored; 8) Play-off.

==== Results summary ====
Overall								Home						Away					
Pld	W	D	L	GF	GA	GD	Pts	W	D	L	GF	GA	GD	W	D	L	GF	GA	GD
26	12	7	7	42	33	+9	43	5	4	4	16	13	+3	7	3	3	26	20	+6

Source: Jupiler Pro League

==== Results by round ====
Round	1	2	3	4	5	6	7	8	9	10	11	12	13	14	15	16	17	18	19	20	21	22	23	24	25	26	27	28	29	30	31	32	33	34
Ground	A	H	A	H	A	H	A	H	H	A	H	A	H	A	A	H	A	H	A	A	H	A	H	H	A	H	A	H	A	H	A	H	A	H
Result	W	D	D	D	D	W	W	L	L	D	W	W	W	L	W	L	W	W	L	W	L	L	D	D	W	W	L	L	W	D	D	W	L	W
Position	1	2	4	8	9	7	4	8	12	11	9	7	5	5	5	5	4	4	5	4	5	6	6	6	5	5	6	7	7	7	7	6	7	6

Source: Jupiler Pro League
A = Away; H = Home; W = Win; D = Draw; L = Loss

==== Matches ====
The league fixtures were announced on 8 June 2021.

24 July 2021 1	Oostende	0–3	Charleroi	Ostend
20:45 CEST (UTC+2)		Report	Bedia 7'; Zaroury 50'; Kayembe 85'	Stadium: Diaz Arena; Attendance: 2,800; Referee: Erik Lambrechts

31 July 2021 2	Charleroi	0–0	Sint-Truiden	Charleroi
16:15 CEST (UTC+2)		Report		Stadium: Stade du Pays de Charleroi; Attendance: 4,648; Referee: Lawrence Visser

8 August 2021 3	OH Leuven	1–1	Charleroi	Leuven
16:00 CEST (UTC+2)		Report		Stadium: Den Dreef; Attendance: 3,300; Referee: Nathan Verboomen

13 August 2021 4	Charleroi	1–1	Antwerp	Charleroi
20:45 CEST (UTC+2)	Zaroury 57'; Gholizadeh (yellow card) 71'	Report	Fischer 38'; Gerkens (yellow card) 42'; L. Verstraete (yellow card) 90+2'	Stadium: Stade du Pays de Charleroi; Attendance: 6,921; Referee: Jonathan Lardot

22 August 2021 5	Zulte Waregem	2–2	Charleroi	Waregem
16:00 CEST (UTC+2)		Report		Stadium: Regenboogstadion; Attendance: 6,043; Referee: Erik Lambrechts

28 August 2021 6	Charleroi	5–2	Beerschot	Charleroi
16:15 CEST (UTC+2)		Report		Stadium: Stade du Pays de Charleroi; Attendance: 5,022; Referee: Christof Dierick

12 September 2021 7	Gent	2–3	Charleroi	Ghent
16:00 CEST (UTC+2)		Report		Stadium: Ghelamco Arena; Attendance: 16,379; Referee: Lothar D'hondt

18 September 2021 8	Charleroi	0–1	Club Brugge	Charleroi
20:45 CEST (UTC+2)	Kayembe (yellow card) 62'	Report	De Ketelaere (yellow card) 60' (goal) 90+2'; Balanta (yellow card) 87'	Stadium: Stade du Pays de Charleroi; Attendance: 8,554; Referee: Jonathan Lardot

26 September 2021 9	Charleroi	0–2	Mechelen	Charleroi
21:00 CEST (UTC+2)		Report		Stadium: Stade du Pays de Charleroi; Attendance: 6,307; Referee: Kevin Van Damme

2 October 2021 10	Kortrijk	2–2	Charleroi	Kortrijk
16:15 CEST (UTC+2)	Selemani 45' (pen.); Alioui 73'	Report	Nicholson 64'; Gholizadeh 90+5'	Stadium: Guldensporen Stadion; Attendance: 4,494; Referee: Bram Van Driessche

17 October 2021 11	Charleroi	2–0	Genk	Charleroi
18:30 CEST (UTC+2)	Nicholson 56'; Gholizadeh 88'	Report		Stadium: Stade du Pays de Charleroi; Attendance: 9,226; Referee: Lawrence Visser

22 October 2021 12	Seraing	1–3	Charleroi	Seraing
20:45 CEST (UTC+2)		Report		Stadium: Stade du Pairay; Attendance: 5,120; Referee: Wesli De Cremer

30 October 2021 13	Charleroi	3–0	Eupen	Charleroi
16:15 CEST (UTC+2)		Report		Stadium: Stade du Pays de Charleroi; Attendance: 5,328; Referee: Bert Put

6 November 2021 14	Union Saint-Gilloise	4–0	Charleroi	Brussels
20:45 CET (UTC+1)	Deniz Undav 29', 39'; Bart Nieuwkoop 34'; Damien Marcq (yellow card) 67'; Joris Kayembe 78' (o.g.)	Report	Karim Zedadka (yellow card) 53'; Ryota Morioka (yellow card) 86'	Stadium: Stade Joseph Marien; Attendance: 8,100; Referee: Nicolas Laforge

20 November 2021 15	Cercle Brugge	1–2	Charleroi	Brugge
16:15 CET (UTC+1)		Report		Stadium: Jan Breydel Stadium; Attendance: 2,527; Referee: Lawrence Visser

27 November 2021 16	Charleroi	1–3	Anderlecht	Charleroi
20:45 CET (UTC+1)	Ilaimaharitra 77'	Report	Refaelov 45'; Gómez 68', 86'	Stadium: Stade du Pays de Charleroi; Attendance: 10,816; Referee: Erik Lambrechts

5 December 2021 17	Standard Liège	0–3	Charleroi	Liège
18:30 CET (UTC+1)		Report	Nicholson 22', 57'; Knežević 38'	Stadium: Stade Maurice Dufrasne; Attendance: 22,512; Referee: Nicolas Laforge

10 December 2021 18	Charleroi	1–0	Oostende	Charleroi
20:45 CET (UTC+1)		Report		Stadium: Stade du Pays de Charleroi; Attendance: 4,315; Referee: Bert Put

16 December 2021 19	Genk	4–2	Charleroi	Genk
21:00 CET (UTC+1)		Report		Stadium: Luminus Arena; Attendance: 10,043; Referee: Bram Van Driessche

19 December 2021 20	Eupen	0–4	Charleroi	Eupen
16:00 CET (UTC+1)		Report		Stadium: Kehrwegstadion; Attendance: 3,000; Referee: Arthur Denil

27 December 2021 21	Charleroi	0–3	OH Leuven	Charleroi
18:45 CET (UTC+1)		Report		Stadium: Stade du Pays de Charleroi; Attendance: 0 Referee: Kevin Van Damme

16 January 2022 22	Antwerp	3–0	Charleroi	Antwerp
13:30 CET (UTC+1)	Frey 11', 14'; B. Verstraete (yellow card) 39'; Bataille (yellow card) 71'; Samatta 77'	Report	Tchatchoua (yellow card) 37'; Van Cleemput (yellow card) 40'	Stadium: Bosuilstadion; Attendance: 0 Referee: Nicolas Laforge

22 January 2022 23	Charleroi	0–0	Gent	Charleroi
20:45 CET (UTC+1)				Stadium: Stade du Pays de Charleroi

25 January 2022 24	Charleroi	1–1	Kortrijk	Charleroi
21:00 CET (UTC+1)				Stadium: Stade du Pays de Charleroi

28 January 2022 25	Sint-Truiden	0–1	Charleroi	Sint-Truiden
20:45 CET (UTC+1)				Stadium: Stayen

4 February 2022 26	Charleroi	2–0	Seraing	Charleroi
20:45 CET (UTC+1)				Stadium: Stade du Pays de Charleroi

13 February 2022 27	Club Brugge	2–0	Charleroi	Bruges
18:30 CET (UTC+1)	Rits 36', 57'	Report		Stadium: Jan Breydel Stadium; Attendance: 15,000; Referee: Erik Lambrechts

19 February 2022 28	Charleroi	0–3	Union Saint-Gilloise	Charleroi
14:45 CET (UTC+1)		Report	Burgess 4'; Lazare 38'; Millán 90+1'	Stadium: Stade du Pays de Charleroi; Attendance: 7,118; Referee: Nicolas Laforge

25 February 2022 29	Beerschot	2–3	Charleroi	Antwerp
20:45 CET (UTC+1)				Stadium: Olympic Stadium

6 March 2022 30	Charleroi	0–0	Standard Liège	Charleroi
18:30 CET (UTC+1)		Report		Stadium: Stade du Pays de Charleroi; Attendance: 13,000; Referee: Jasper Vergoote

12 March 2022 31	Mechelen	2–2	Charleroi	Mechelen
16:15 CET (UTC+1)	Hairemans 5'; Cuypers 12'	Report	Andreou 48'; Bayo 73'	Stadium: AFAS Stadion; Attendance: 10,125; Referee: Jan Boterberg

19 March 2022 32	Charleroi	5–0	Cercle Brugge	Charleroi
18:30 CET (UTC+1)	Kayembe 6'; Bayo 9', 35'; Heymans 41'; Zaroury 54'	Report		Stadium: Stade du Pays de Charleroi; Attendance: 5,636; Referee: Bram Van Driessche

3 April 2022 33	Anderlecht	4–0	Charleroi	Anderlecht
18:30 CEST (UTC+2)	Kouamé 19'; Zirkzee 61'; Amuzu 79'; Murillo 86'	Report		Stadium: Constant Vanden Stock Stadium; Attendance: 19,000; Referee: Erik Lambrechts

10 April 2022 34	Charleroi	3–0	Zulte Waregem	Charleroi
18:30 CEST (UTC+2)	Bayo 3', 16'; Seck 28' (o.g.)	Report		Stadium: Stade du Pays de Charleroi; Attendance: 7,866; Referee: Wesli De Cremer

==== Play-Off II ====
Pos	Team	Pld	W	D	L	GF	GA	GD	Pts	Qualification or relegation	GNT	GNK	CHA	MEC
1	Gent	6	4	0	2	9	5	+4	43	Qualification for the Europa League play-off round (Note: Gent qualified for the Europa League play-off round as the 2021–22 Belgian Cup winners.)	—	0–1	1–2	1–0
2	Genk	6	3	2	1	10	8	+2	37		0–2	—	3–2	4–2
3	Charleroi	6	2	1	3	10	12	−2	34		1–3	2–2	—	3–2
4	Mechelen	6	1	1	4	6	10	−4	30		1–2	0–0	1–0	—

Source: Jupiler Pro League (in Dutch), Soccerway
Legend: Blue = home team win; Yellow = draw; Red = away team win.
Rules for classification: 1) Points; 2) Points without (possible) half points added due to rounding; 3) Regular season finishing position.

==== Results summary ====
Overall								Home						Away					
Pld	W	D	L	GF	GA	GD	Pts	W	D	L	GF	GA	GD	W	D	L	GF	GA	GD
6	2	1	3	10	12	−2	7	1	1	1	6	7	−1	1	0	2	4	5	−1

Source: Jupiler Pro League

==== Results by round ====
Round	1	2	3	4	5	6
Ground	A	H	H	A	H	A
Result	L	L	D	L	W	W
Position						

Source: Jupiler Pro League
A = Away; H = Home; W = Win; D = Draw; L = Loss

==== Matches ====
23 April 2022 1	Mechelen	1–0	Charleroi	Mechelen
20:45 CEST (UTC+2)	Vanlerberghe 51'	Report		Stadium: Achter de Kazerne; Attendance: 9,068; Referee: Nicolas Laforge

30 April 2022 2	Charleroi	1–3	Gent	Charleroi
18:00 CEST (UTC+2)	Zorgane 45'; Nkuba (yellow card) 53'; Knezevic (yellow card) 90+1'	Report	Lemajić 53', 61', (yellow card) 43'; Ngadeu-Ngadjui 67'	Stadium: Stade du Pays de Charleroi; Attendance: 4,985; Referee: Erik Lambrechts

6 May 2022 3	Charleroi	2–2	Genk	Charleroi
20:45 CEST (UTC+2)		Report		Stadium: Stade du Pays de Charleroi; Attendance: 4,614; Referee: Lothar D'hondt

10 May 2022 4	Genk	3–2	Charleroi	Genk
21:00 CEST (UTC+2)		Report		Stadium: Cegeka Arena; Attendance: 10,000; Referee: Jasper Vergoote

14 May 2022 5	Charleroi	3–2	Mechelen	Charleroi
20:45 CEST (UTC+2)		Report		Stadium: Stade du Pays de Charleroi; Attendance: 4,111; Referee: Wim Smet

21 May 2022 6	Gent	1–2	Charleroi	Ghent
20:45 CEST (UTC+2)	Ngadeu-Ngadjui 40'	Report	Gholizadeh 15'; Heymans 90+2'	Stadium: Ghelamco Arena; Attendance: 8,747; Referee: Wesli De Cremer

=== Belgian Cup ===
27 October 2021 Sixth round	Charleroi	0–0 (a.e.t.) (3–4 p)	Lommel	Charleroi
20:00 CEST (UTC+2)		Report		Stadium: Stade du Pays de Charleroi; Referee: Jan Boterberg
	Penalties
	Morioka (penalty missed); Zaroury (penalty scored); Gholizadeh (penalty scored); Van Cleemput (penalty scored); Gillet (penalty missed)		(penalty scored) Roque; (penalty scored) Henkens; (penalty scored) Vandersmissen; (penalty scored) Sales; (penalty missed) Þórðarson
