= Mohamed Farsi =

Canadian-Algerian footballer (born 1999)

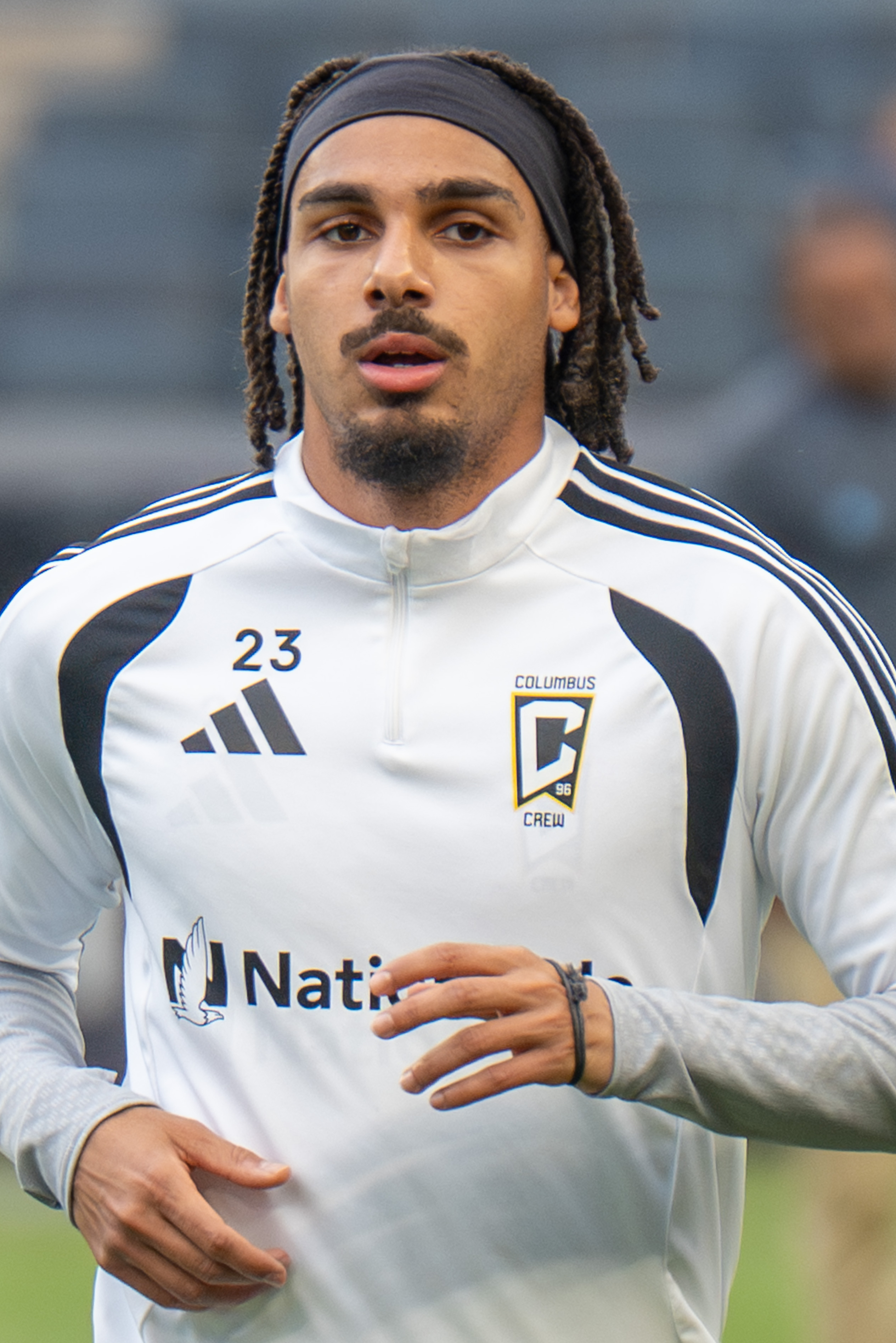
- Farsi with the Columbus Crew in 2026

Personal information
- Full name: Mohamed Ramzdine Farsi
- Date of birth: 16 December 1999 (age 26)
- Place of birth: Montreal, Quebec, Canada
- Height: 1.78 m (5 ft 10 in)
- Position: Right-back

Team information
- Current team: Columbus Crew
- Number: 23

Youth career
- 2008–2013: CS Boucaniers
- 2013–2014: CS Notre-Dame-de-Grâce
- 2015–2016: CS Panellinios

College career
Years	Team	Apps	(Gls)
2017	Collège Ahuntsic		

Senior career*
Years	Team	Apps	(Gls)
2018	CS Longueuil	13	(0)
2019	AS Blainville	9	(0)
2019–2020	AS Aïn M'lila	0	(0)
2020–2021	Cavalry FC	35	(2)
2022	Columbus Crew 2	18	(2)
2022	→ Columbus Crew (loan)	2	(0)
2022–	Columbus Crew	103	(6)

International career^{‡}
2020	Canada (futsal)	2	(1)
2021	Canada U23	2	(0)
2024–	Algeria	5	(0)
- * Club domestic league appearances and goals as of October 28, 2026 ‡ National team caps and goals as of 26 June 2025

Mohamed Ramzdine Farsi (Arabic: مُحَمَّد رَمْزَدِين فَارِسِيّ; born 16 December 1999) is a professional footballer who plays as a right-back for Major League Soccer club Columbus Crew. Born in Canada, he represents the Algeria national team.

== Early life ==
Farsi was born and raised in Montreal, Quebec, to Algerian parents from Oran. He began playing soccer at age eight with local club CS Boucaniers. He later played youth soccer for Notre-Dame-de-Grâce and CS Panellinios, eventually playing at the senior amateur level in the LSEQ with Panellinios's senior team.

== Club career ==
=== College and semi-pro ===
In 2017, Farsi played college soccer for Collège Ahuntsic, winning the provincial championship and being named to the all-star team.

In 2018, Farsi signed with Première Ligue de soccer du Québec side Longueuil, making thirteen league appearances that season.

In 2019, Farsi switched to defending PLSQ champions Blainville, making nine league appearances and two appearances in the Canadian Championship against Canadian Premier League side York9.

=== Aïn M'lila ===
In 2019, Farsi signed his first professional contract with Algerian Ligue Professionnelle 1 side AS Aïn M'lila. He left after the season, without making an appearance.

=== Cavalry FC ===
On 15 April 2020, Farsi signed with Canadian Premier League side Cavalry FC, after impressing during a trial. He made his debut as a substitute in Cavalry's first game of the 2020 Canadian Premier League season, a 2–2 draw with Forge FC. Farsi excelled during the 2020 season, earning praise for his offensive and defensive efforts, and was named for the league's U-21 player of the year. He was awarded the El Jimador Shot of the Year, for his goal against Pacific FC on 9 September 2020. In November 2020, Farsi re-signed with the club for the 2021 season. After the 2021 season, Cavalry announced that Farsi was leaving the club in order to pursue a contract in Europe or Major League Soccer.

=== Columbus Crew ===
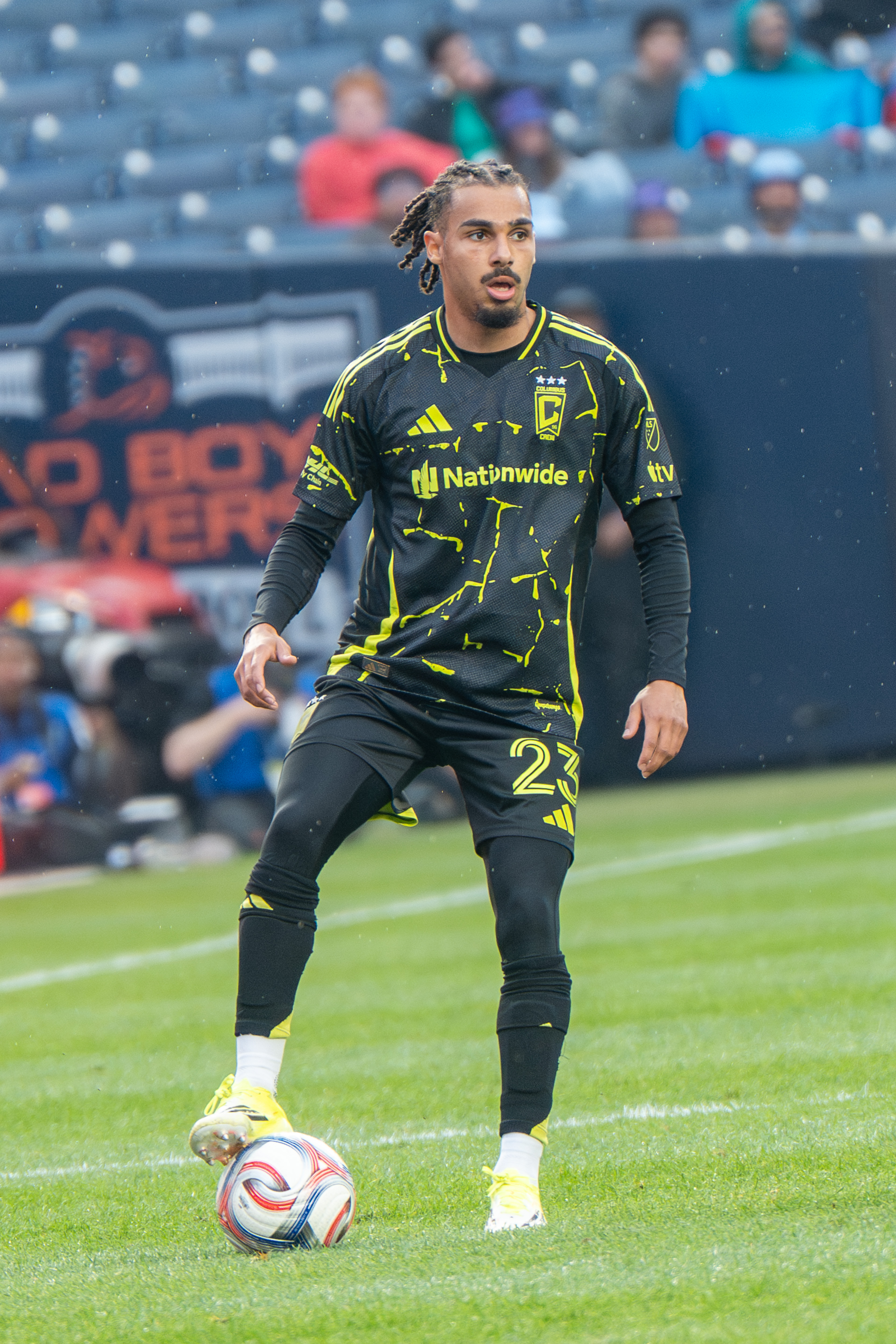
Farsi with the Columbus Crew in 2026

==== Reserve team ====
In March 2022, Columbus Crew 2 of MLS Next Pro announced they had signed Farsi ahead of their inaugural season. He made his debut in the club's first match against Inter Miami CF II on 26 March. He scored a brace against FC Cincinnati 2 in the final game of the regular season, and won the MLS Next Pro Cup at the conclusion of the playoffs. At the end of the season, he was named to the MLS Next Pro Best XI.

==== First team ====
On 18 June 2022, he signed a short-term loan with the Columbus Crew first team in Major League Soccer for their match against Charlotte FC, in which he appeared as a substitute. He signed a first team contract with the Columbus Crew in July, and appeared in seven games, all of them as second half substitutions.

Farsi was a regular starter for Columbus during 2023, playing as a right wing-back. He scored his first goal for Columbus on 26 April 2023, in a U.S. Open Cup match against Indy Eleven. On 9 December, he played 86 minutes in MLS Cup 2023, helping Columbus win its third league championship. In February 2024 Farsi signed a contract extension through the 2027 season, with a club option for 2028. He scored his first league goal for Columbus on 9 March 2024, against the Chicago Fire in the 10th minute of second half stoppage time. At the conclusion of the 2024 season, Farsi made 40 total appearances across all competitions, including all five games en route to winning the Leagues Cup. During the 2025 season, he scored his only goal of the year in a 1–0 win at home versus the Philadelphia Union on 29 June. At the beginning of July, Farsi suffered an injury that was initially considered day-to-day. After suffering a setback in his recovery, he underwent surgery for a sports hernia on 24 September which kept him out for the remainder of the year.

== International career ==
=== Youth and futsal ===
Before starting his professional career, Farsi was a prominent member of the Canadian futsal team, winning the Canadian Futsal Player of the Year award for 2020. He would go on to be involved in the 2020 Olympic football qualifiers with the Canada under-23s after initially being named a back up to the team.

=== Senior ===
Eligible for Algeria and Canada, Farsi confirmed he had declined an invitation to Canada's preliminary rosters ahead of the 2023 CONCACAF Nations League Finals and the 2023 CONCACAF Gold Cup, adding that he was not ready to decide his international future.

On 29 August 2024, Farsi was called up by Algeria to represent the nation in their two 2025 AFCON Qualifiers against Equatorial Guinea and Liberia, ultimately concluding that he has decided to represent Algeria. Farsi debuted on 10 September 2024 against Liberia.

== Style of play ==
Farsi is a versatile and dynamic player, known for his technical ability, quick pace, and attacking mindset. He primarily plays as a wing-back but is also proficient in central defense and midfield positions. His ability to contribute both defensively and offensively makes him a valuable asset on the pitch. Farsi excels in creating scoring opportunities with accurate crosses and his quick, aggressive movements up the field. He describes himself as "someone who enjoys getting forward, running at players, and dribbling in one-on-one situations".

== Personal life ==
Farsi is multilingual, fluent in English, French, and Arabic. Growing up, he participated in soccer, futsal, as well as taekwondo. He is a fan of Lionel Messi, FC Barcelona, and Manchester City.

== Career statistics ==
As of October 28, 2026

Appearances and goals by club, season and competition
Club	Season	League			Playoffs		National cup		League cup		Continental		Total	
Club	Season	Division	Apps	Goals	Apps	Goals	Apps	Goals	Apps	Goals	Apps	Goals	Apps	Goals
CS Longueuil	2018	PLSQ	13	0	—		—		1	0	—		14	0
AS Blainville	2019	PLSQ	9	0	—		2	0	0	0	—		11	0
AS Aïn M'lila	2019–20	Ligue Professionnelle 1	0	0	—		0	0	—		—		0	0
Cavalry FC	2020	CPL	10	1	—		—		—		—		10	1
Cavalry FC	2021	CPL	25	1	1	0	2	0	—		—		28	1
Cavalry FC	Total		35	2	1	0	2	0	0	0	0	0	38	2
Columbus Crew 2	2022	MLS Next Pro	18	2	1	0	—		—		—		19	2
Columbus Crew (loan)	2022	MLS	2	0	0	0	—		—		—		2	0
Columbus Crew	2022	MLS	5	0	0	0	—		—		—		5	0
Columbus Crew	2023	MLS	31	0	5	0	3	1	3	0	—		42	1
Columbus Crew	2024	MLS	27	3	2	0	0	0	5	0	6	0	40	3
Columbus Crew	2025	MLS	18	1	0	0	0	0	0	0	2	0	20	1
Columbus Crew	2026	MLS	20	2	0	0	2	0	3	0	0	0	25	2
Columbus Crew	Total		103	6	7	0	5	1	11	0	8	0	134	8
Career total			178	10	9	0	9	1	12	0	8	0	216	11

== Honours ==
Columbus Crew

- MLS Cup: 2023
- CONCACAF Champions Cup runner-up: 2024
- Leagues Cup: 2024

Individual

- Canadian Premier League Under 21 Canadian Player of the Year: 2020
