= Eric Bailly =

Ivorian footballer (born 1994)

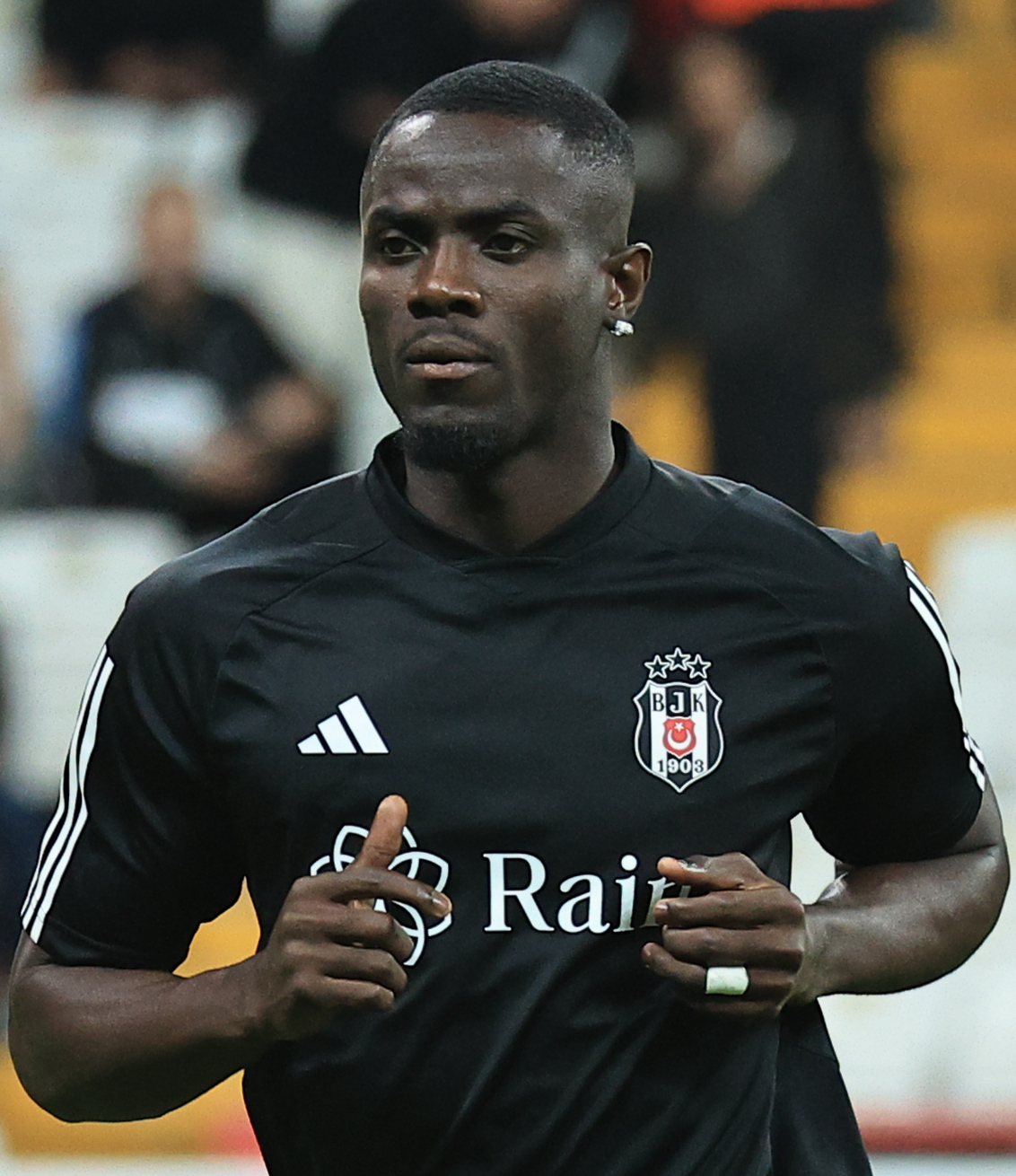
- Bailly playing for Beşiktaş in 2023

Personal information
- Full name: Eric Bertrand Bailly
- Date of birth: 12 April 1994 (age 32)
- Place of birth: Bingerville, Ivory Coast
- Height: 1.87 m (6 ft 2 in)
- Position: Centre-back

Team information
- Current team: Columbus Crew
- Number: 3

Youth career
- 2011–2013: Espanyol

Senior career*
Years	Team	Apps	(Gls)
2013–2014	Espanyol B	21	(0)
2014–2015	Espanyol	5	(0)
2015–2016	Villarreal	35	(0)
2016–2023	Manchester United	70	(1)
2022–2023	→ Marseille (loan)	17	(0)
2023	Beşiktaş	5	(0)
2023–2025	Villarreal	22	(0)
2025–2026	Oviedo	15	(1)
2026–	Columbus Crew	6	(0)

International career^{‡}
2021	Ivory Coast Olympic	4	(1)
2015–	Ivory Coast	50	(2)
Medal record
Representing Ivory Coast
Men's football
Africa Cup of Nations
Winner	2015 Equatorial Guinea
- * Club domestic league appearances and goals as of 8 November 2026 ‡ National team caps and goals as of 23:12, 15 October 2024 (UTC)

Eric Bertrand Bailly (French pronunciation: [eʁik bɛʁ.tʁɑ̃ baji]; born 12 April 1994) is an Ivorian professional footballer who plays for Major League Soccer club Columbus Crew and the Ivory Coast national team. Although he mainly plays as a centre-back, he can also play as a right-back.

Bailly began his professional career at Spain's Espanyol, before transferring to Villarreal. He spent two seasons at the club, before signing for Manchester United in June 2016. Bailly made more than 100 appearances for United and had a loan spell at Marseille.

Bailly made his international debut for the Ivory Coast in 2015 and helped them win that year's Africa Cup of Nations. He played in two further African tournaments and the 2020 Olympics.

== Club career ==
=== Espanyol ===
Born in Bingerville, Bailly joined Espanyol's youth system in December 2011, aged 17. Bailly was spotted by Espanyol's Emilio Montagut after taking part in a youth tournament in Burkina Faso, organised by Spanish company Promoesport. Some records of that time erroneously list his name as Eric Bertrand (his middle name misinterpreted as his paternal surname). He only received a work permit in October of the following year, and made his senior debut in the 2013–14 campaign with the reserves, in Segunda División B.

On 5 October 2014, Bailly made his first-team – and La Liga – debut, coming on as a late substitute in a 2–0 home win against Real Sociedad. He was promoted to the main squad shortly after.

=== Villarreal ===
On 29 January 2015, Bailly signed a five-and-a-half-year contract with fellow La Liga team Villarreal for a €5.7 million fee, mainly as a replacement to Arsenal-bound Gabriel Paulista. He made his debut for the Yellow Submarine on 22 February, starting in a 1–0 home win against Eibar.

On 19 March, Bailly made his UEFA Europa League debut, starting and being sent off in a 2–1 away loss against Sevilla

On 18 October 2015, Bailly was sent off shortly after the interval in a 2–1 loss to Celta Vigo at the Estadio El Madrigal. He made seven appearances as the team reached the last four of the 2015–16 UEFA Europa League; on 22 October he scored his first career goal and only one for the team, to conclude a 4–0 home group win over Dinamo Minsk.

=== Manchester United ===
==== 2016–17 season: Debut campaign and Europa League ====
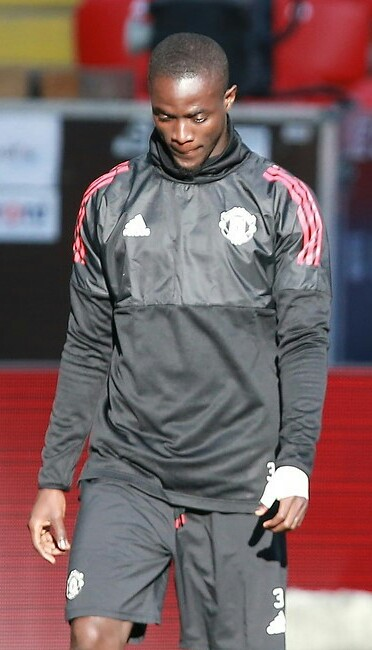
Bailly warming up for Manchester United in 2017

On 8 June 2016, Bailly joined Premier League side Manchester United for a reported fee of £30 million, signing a four-year contract, with the option of an additional two. He was the first player signed by their new manager José Mourinho.

He made his competitive debut on 7 August in a 2–1 win against Leicester City at Wembley to win the FA Community Shield, and was named man of the match. He was again named man of the match on his Premier League debut a week later, a 3–1 win at Bournemouth.

He was voted Manchester United's Player of the Month for August 2016. He said to MUTV: "The Man-of-the-Match awards are something I hadn’t thought about, but I got them through the hard work I have put in. I hope to see more of that in the weeks ahead of us." On 23 October 2016, Bailly was substituted off in the 52nd minute after suffering a serious knee injury during the 4–0 loss at Chelsea. He made 11 appearances as the Red Devils won the Europa League, and was named in the Squad of the Season.

==== 2017–18 season ====
On 19 August 2017, Bailly scored the first league goal of his club career, and his only goal for the club in Manchester United's first in a 4–0 away win over Swansea City, following up after Paul Pogba's header came back off the underside of the crossbar.

On 8 November 2017, Bailly suffered an ankle injury, and he was sidelined for around 100 days and returned to action on 17 February 2018, coming on as a substitute for Romelu Lukaku in the final 90-minute added additional time in a 2–0 win over Huddersfield in the FA Cup. He went on and made a total of 18 appearances and scored one goal in all competitions at the end of the season.

==== 2018–2021: Injury-hit campaigns ====
Bailly's injury problems continued in the 2018–19 season, which caused him to only feature in 18 games in all competitions, with 12 appearances coming in from the Premier League. He was sent off on 30 December 2018 in a 4–1 home win over AFC Bournemouth for a foul on Ryan Fraser, for which he was criticised by manager Ole Gunnar Solskjær.

In July 2019, Bailly was ruled out for a further four months after suffering a knee injury in a pre-season friendly against Tottenham Hotspur in China. On 10 January 2020, he made his return from injury by playing in a game with Manchester United's under-23 team against Newcastle United. On 17 January 2020, Bailly signed a two-year contract extension with United, tying him to the club until the end of the 2021–22 season. He made a comeback in the Premier League and played his first match of the season on 17 February, featuring for the whole 90 minutes in a 2–0 win against Chelsea.

He made his 100th appearance for the club in a 1–1 draw against AC Milan in the Europa League at Old Trafford. On 26 April 2021, he signed a contract to 2024, with the option of one more year.

On 23 September 2021, Bailly made his first appearance of the campaign in an EFL Cup tie against West Ham United, which Manchester United lost 1–0.

==== Marseille (loan) ====
On 24 August 2022, Bailly joined Ligue 1 club Marseille on loan for the duration of the 2022–23 season. He debuted for Marseille as a substitute in a 3–0 win over Nice on 28 August.

On 7 January 2023, in a Coupe de France match against Hyères, Bailly was sent off for a dangerous high challenge that hospitalised Moussa N'Diaye. On 19 January, Bailly was issued a seven-match suspension by the French Football Federation.

Bailly ended his spell at Marseille having made 17 appearances during the 2022–23 Ligue 1 season, including five starts.

=== Beşiktaş ===
On 4 September 2023, Süper Lig club Beşiktaş announced the signing of Bailly, on a reported one-year contract.

On 11 December 2023, Beşiktaş announced that Bailly had been excluded from the squad along with Vincent Aboubakar, Valentin Rosier, Rachid Ghezzal and Jean Onana due to poor performance and incompatibility within the team. On 29 December 2023, it was announced that Bailly's contract had been terminated.

=== Return to Villarreal ===
On 30 December 2023, Bailly returned to Villarreal, signing a contract until 30 June 2025.

=== Oviedo ===
On 18 August 2025, Bailly signed a two-year deal with Real Oviedo also in the Spanish top tier. He scored his first La Liga goal in the stoppage time of a 3–3 away draw with Real Sociedad on 21 February 2026.

=== Columbus Crew ===
On 17 July 2026, Bailly completed a free transfer to MLS side Columbus Crew, signing a contract valid until June 2027, with the possibility of an extension until 2029.

== International career ==
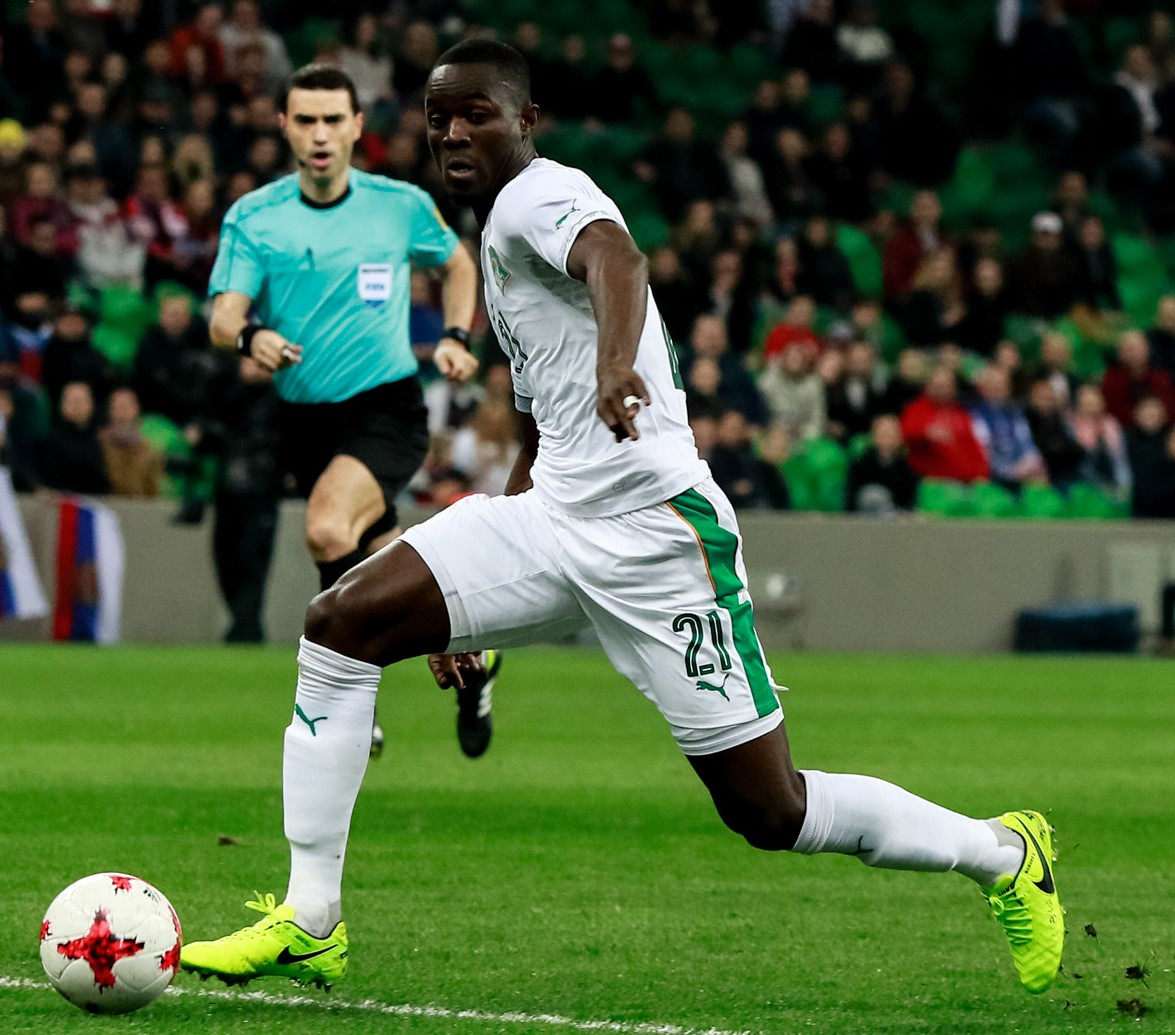
Bailly playing for the Ivory Coast in 2017

On 29 December 2014, Bailly was included in Hervé Renard's 23-man squad for the 2015 Africa Cup of Nations. He made his debut on 11 January 2015, in a friendly against Nigeria, and appeared in all six matches during the competition as his side were crowned champions. He was again named in the Elephants' squad for the 2017 Africa Cup of Nations in Gabon, playing the entirety of all three matches in a campaign which ended in the group stage.

On 12 October 2018, Bailly scored his first international goal in a 4–0 win over the Central African Republic in a 2019 Africa Cup of Nations qualifier at the Stade Bouaké. The following April he suffered a knee injury, ruling him out of the finals in Egypt.

On 3 July 2021, Bailly was selected as one of the designated overaged players in the Ivory Coast Olympic team for the 2020 Summer Olympics. Bailly made his Olympics debut in a 2–1 win against Saudi Arabia on 22 July. He made four appearances in the tournament and scored one goal, in a quarter-final defeat against Spain.

At the 2021 Africa Cup of Nations, held at the start of the following year in Cameroon, Bailly suffered a head injury at the end of a 2–2 draw with Sierra Leone in the second game, thereby missing the third against Algeria. He wore a scrum cap in the goalless last 16 match against Egypt and was the only player to miss in the penalty shootout, with his shot being saved by substitute goalkeeper Mohamed Abou Gabal.

== Career statistics ==
=== Club ===
As of match played 21 November 2026

Appearances and goals by club, season and competition
Club	Season	League			National cup (Note: Includes Copa del Rey, FA Cup, Coupe de France, U.S. Open Cup)		League cup (Note: Includes EFL Cup)		Continental		Other		Total	
Club	Season	Division	Apps	Goals	Apps	Goals	Apps	Goals	Apps	Goals	Apps	Goals	Apps	Goals
Espanyol B	2013–14	Segunda División B	20	0	—		—		—		—		20	0
Espanyol B	2014–15	Segunda División B	1	0	—		—		—		—		1	0
Espanyol B	Total		21	0	0	0	0	0	0	0	0	0	21	0
Espanyol	2014–15	La Liga	5	0	0	0	—		—		—		5	0
Villarreal	2014–15	La Liga	10	0	0	0	—		2 (Note: Appearances in UEFA Europa League)	0	—		12	0
Villarreal	2015–16	La Liga	25	0	3	0	—		7	1	—		35	1
Villarreal	Total		35	0	3	0	0	0	9	1	0	0	47	1
Manchester United	2016–17	Premier League	25	0	0	0	1	0	11	0	1 (Note: Appearance in FA Community Shield)	0	38	0
Manchester United	2017–18	Premier League	13	1	2	0	0	0	3 (Note: Appearances in UEFA Champions League)	0	0	0	18	1
Manchester United	2018–19	Premier League	12	0	1	0	1	0	4	0	—		18	0
Manchester United	2019–20	Premier League	4	0	3	0	0	0	4	0	—		11	0
Manchester United	2020–21	Premier League	12	0	1	0	3	0	5	0	—		21	0
Manchester United	2021–22	Premier League	4	0	0	0	1	0	2	0	—		7	0
Manchester United	Total		70	1	7	0	6	0	29	0	1	0	113	1
Marseille (loan)	2022–23	Ligue 1	17	0	1	0	—		5	0	—		23	0
Beşiktaş	2023–24	Süper Lig	5	0	0	0	—		3 (Note: Appearances in UEFA Europa Conference League)	0	—		8	0
Villarreal	2023–24	La Liga	10	0	1	0	—		2	0	—		13	0
Villarreal	2024–25	La Liga	12	0	0	0	—		—		—		12	0
Villarreal	Total		22	0	1	0	0	0	2	0	0	0	25	0
Oviedo	2025–26	La Liga	15	1	1	0	—		—		—		16	1
Columbus Crew	2026	Major League Soccer	6	0	1	0	—		—		2 (Note: One appearance in Leagues Cup, one appearance in MLS Cup playoffs)	0	9	0
Career total			196	2	14	0	6	0	48	1	3	0	267	3

=== International ===
As of match played 15 October 2024

Appearances and goals by national team and year
National team	Year	Apps	Goals
Ivory Coast	2015	12	0
Ivory Coast	2016	5	0
Ivory Coast	2017	11	0
Ivory Coast	2018	5	1
Ivory Coast	2019	1	1
Ivory Coast	2020	2	0
Ivory Coast	2021	5	0
Ivory Coast	2022	5	0
Ivory Coast	2023	3	0
Ivory Coast	2024	1	0
Total		50	2

As of match played 15 October 2024
Ivory Coast score listed first, score column indicates score after each Bailly goal.

List of international goals scored by Eric Bailly
No.	Date	Venue	Cap	Opponent	Score	Result	Competition
1	12 October 2018	Stade Bouaké, Bouaké, Ivory Coast	32	Central African Republic	2–0	4–0	2019 Africa Cup of Nations qualification
2	23 March 2019	Stade Félix Houphouët-Boigny, Abidjan, Ivory Coast	34	Rwanda	2–0	3–0	2019 Africa Cup of Nations qualification

== Honours ==
Manchester United

- EFL Cup: 2016–17
- FA Community Shield: 2016
- UEFA Europa League: 2016–17; runner-up: 2020–21
- FA Cup runner-up: 2017–18

Columbus Crew

- U.S. Open Cup runner-up: 2026

Ivory Coast

- Africa Cup of Nations: 2015

Individual

- CAF Team of the Year: 2016, 2017, 2018
- UEFA Europa League Squad of the Season: 2016–17
- IFFHS CAF Men's Team of the Decade 2011–2020
