= Anass Zaroury =

Footballer (born 2000)

Anass Zaroury أنس الزروري
- Zaroury with Panathinaikos in 2026

Personal information
- Full name: Anass Zaroury
- Date of birth: 7 November 2000 (age 26)
- Place of birth: Mechelen, Belgium
- Height: 1.76 m (5 ft 9 in)
- Position: Left winger

Team information
- Current team: Columbus Crew (on loan from Panathinaikos)
- Number: 21

Youth career
- 2006–2011: SK Heffen
- 2011–2012: Mechelen
- 2012–2014: JMG Academy Belgium
- 2014–2019: Zulte Waregem

Senior career*
Years	Team	Apps	(Gls)
2019–2021	Lommel	21	(6)
2021–2022	Charleroi	43	(7)
2021	→ Lommel (loan)	9	(1)
2022–2024	Burnley	41	(7)
2024	→ Hull City (loan)	12	(2)
2024–2026	Lens	28	(2)
2025–2026	→ Panathinaikos (loan)	29	(4)
2026–	Panathinaikos	0	(0)
2026–	→ Columbus Crew (loan)	8	(3)

International career
2017	Belgium U17	4	(2)
2017	Belgium U18	3	(0)
2021–2022	Belgium U21	7	(0)
2022–2023	Morocco	4	(0)
- * Club domestic league appearances and goals as of 01:50, 8 November 2026 (UTC)

Anass Zaroury (Arabic: أنس الزروري; born 7 November 2000) is a professional footballer who plays as a left winger for Major League Soccer side Columbus Crew, on loan from Greek Super League club Panathinaikos. Born in Belgium, he played for the Morocco national team.

== Club career ==
=== Charleroi ===
On 1 February 2021, Zaroury joined Belgian First Division A side Charleroi on a two-and-a-half-year deal, returning on loan to Lommel until the end of the season.

=== Burnley ===
On 30 August 2022, Zaroury signed for EFL Championship club Burnley for an undisclosed fee on a four-year deal. He quickly became a fan favourite due to his skilful style, and soon had his own chant to the tune of Heartbeat. He scored his first goal for Burnley in a 4–0 win against Swansea City on 15 October 2022. Zaroury scored the second and third goals as Burnley beat Bournemouth in the third round of the FA Cup in January 2023. On 11 August 2023, Zaroury received a red card against Manchester City in the first Premier League game of his career.

==== Hull City (loan) ====
On 1 February 2024, Zaroury moved on loan to Hull City for the remainder of the 2023–24 season. He made his debut for the club on 3 February in the home 1–0 win against Millwall. After five minutes, his right-footed shot hit the bar, with Jaden Philogene on hand to push home the rebound. On 20 February, Zaroury scored his first goal for Hull, as a part of their 2–1 away win against Southampton. On 21 May 2024, Burnley announced the player would be returning once the loan ended.

=== Lens ===
On 22 August 2024, Zaroury signed for Ligue 1 club Lens on a four-year deal for an undisclosed fee.

=== Panathinaikos ===
On 3 August 2025, Zaroury was acquired by Super League Greece club Panathinaikos on an initial loan deal for the 2025–26 season, with an option to buy. On 25 September 2025, he scored the first hat-trick of his career, scoring three of Panathinaikos' four goals in a 4–1 away win over Young Boys in the first matchday of the League Phase of the Europa League. He also became the fourth player in Panathinaikos' history to score a hat-trick in European competition. On 22 May 2026, Panathinaikos activated the option to purchase Zarouri from Lens, acquiring his rights on a permanent transfer until 2029.

==== Columbus Crew (loan) ====
On 3 September 2026, Zaroury moved on loan to Major League Soccer club Columbus Crew.

== International career ==
Born in Belgium, Zaroury is Moroccan by descent. He is a former youth international for Belgium, having played with them up to the Belgium U21s. On 16 November 2022, Zaroury was officially invited to join the Moroccan national team, during the 2022 FIFA World Cup in Qatar, in which he replaced Amine Harit, who suffered an injury one week before the World Cup started. On 17 November, he made his international debut in a friendly match against Georgia.

== Career statistics ==
=== Club ===
As of match played 7 November 2026

Appearances and goals by club, season and competition
Club	Season	League			National cup (Note: Includes Belgian Cup, FA Cup, Greek Football Cup, U.S. Open Cup)		League cup (Note: Includes EFL Cup)		Continental		Total	
Club	Season	Division	Apps	Goals	Apps	Goals	Apps	Goals	Apps	Goals	Apps	Goals
Lommel	2019–20	Belgian First Division B	5	0	1	1	—		—		6	1
Lommel	2020–21	Belgian First Division B	25	7	2	0	—		—		27	7
Lommel	Total		30	7	3	1	—		—		33	8
Charleroi	2021–22	Belgian First Division A	38	5	1	0	—		—		39	5
Charleroi	2022–23	Belgian Pro League	5	2	—		—		—		5	2
Charleroi	Total		43	7	1	0	—		—		44	7
Burnley	2022–23	Championship	34	7	4	2	1	2	—		39	11
Burnley	2023–24	Premier League	6	0	1	0	2	0	—		9	0
Burnley	2024–25	Championship	1	0	0	0	0	0	—		1	0
Burnley	Total		41	7	5	2	3	2	—		49	11
Hull City (loan)	2023–24	Championship	12	2	—		—		—		12	2
Lens	2024–25	Ligue 1	28	2	0	0	—		0	0	28	2
Panathinaikos (loan)	2025–26	Super League Greece	15	2	2	0	—		9 (Note: Appearances in UEFA Europa League)	3	26	5
Panathinaikos	2026–27	Super League Greece	0	0	0	0	—		4 (Note: Appearances in UEFA Conference League)	0	4	0
Columbus Crew (loan)	2026	Major League Soccer	8	3	2 (Note: Appearances in U.S. Open Cup)	0	—		—	—	10	3
Career total			171	29	13	3	3	2	13	3	201	37

=== International ===
Appearances and goals by national team and year
National team	Year	Apps	Goals
Morocco	2022	2	0
Morocco	2023	2	0
Total		4	0

== Honours ==
Burnley

- EFL Championship: 2022–23

Orders

- Order of the Throne: 2022
