= 2019–20 AS Ain M'lila season =

AS Ain M'lila
2019–20 season
- Chairman: Elhedi Bensid
- Head coach: Azzedine Ait Djoudi (until 30 December 2019); Lyamine Bougherara (from 8 January 2020)
- Stadium: Zoubir Khelifi Touhami Stadium
- Ligue 1: 8th
- Algerian Cup: Round of 16
- Top goalscorer: League: Mohamed Tiaiba (10 goals); All: Mohamed Tiaiba (11 goals)
Home colours	Away colours	Third colours

In the 2019–20 season, AS Ain M'lila is competing in the Ligue 1 for the 19th season, as well as the Algerian Cup. On March 15, 2020, the Ligue de Football Professionnel (LFP) decided to halt the season due to the COVID-19 pandemic in Algeria. On July 29, 2020, the LFP declared that season is over and CR Belouizdad to be the champion, the promotion of four teams from the League 2, and scraping the relegation for the current season.

== Competitions ==
=== Overview ===
Competition	Record								Started round	Final position / round	First match	Last match
Competition	G	W	D	L	GF	GA	GD	Win %	Started round	Final position / round	First match	Last match
Ligue 1	22	8	8	6	26	25	+1	36.36	—N/a	8th	16 August 2019	14 March 2020
Algerian Cup	3	1	1	1	3	4	−1	33.33	Round of 64	Round of 16	5 January 2020	13 February 2020
Total	25	9	9	7	29	29	+0	36.00				

Updated to match played 14 March 2020
Source: Competitions

== League table ==
Pos	Team	Pld	W	D	L	GF	GA	GD	Pts	PPG
6	USM Alger	21	9	5	7	25	22	+3	32 (Note: USM Alger were deducted 3 points due to their withdrawal in their game against MC Alger. The decision has been appealed to the Court of Arbitration for Sport. On August 28, 2020, after postponing several times the final decision was made without appeal, which is to return the three points and repeat the match.)	1.52
7	JS Saoura	22	9	6	7	19	18	+1	33	1.50
8	AS Aïn M'lila	22	8	8	6	26	25	+1	32	1.45
9	MC Oran	22	7	9	6	28	24	+4	30	1.36
10	Paradou AC	20	7	5	8	20	18	+2	26	1.30

Updated to match(es) played on 15 March 2020. Source: dzfoot.com
Rules for classification: 1) points; 2) head-to-head points; 3) head-to-head goal difference; 4) goal difference; 5) total goals; 6) fairplay ranking; 7) playoff.

=== Results summary ===
Overall								Home						Away					
Pld	W	D	L	GF	GA	GD	Pts	W	D	L	GF	GA	GD	W	D	L	GF	GA	GD
22	8	8	6	26	25	+1	32	7	4	0	15	3	+12	1	4	6	11	22	−11

Last updated: 14 March 2020.
Source: Competitive matches

=== Results by round ===
Round	1	2	3	4	5	6	7	8	9	10	11	12	13	14	15	16	17	18	19	20	21	22	23	24	25	26	27	28	29	30
Ground	A	H	A	H	A	H	A	H	A	H	A	H	A	H	A	H	A	H	A	H	A	H	A	H	A	H	A	H	A	H
Result	D	D	L	W	D	D	D	W	L	W	D	W	L	D	L	W	L	D	L	W	W	W	C	C	C	C	C	C	C	C
Position																							8	8	8	8	8	8	8	8

Updated to match(es) played on 14 March 2020. Source: Competitive matches
A = Away; H = Home; W = Win; D = Draw; L = Loss

=== Matches ===
Win Draw Loss

16 August 2019 Round 1	MC Alger	1–1	AS Ain M'lila	Algiers
21:00	Derrardja 82'	Soccerway report	Siam 84'	Stadium: July 5, 1962 Stadium; Referee: Mohamed Saïdi

1 September 2019 Round 3	USM Alger	3–2	AS Aïn M'lila	Bologhine
21:00	Koudri 44'; Zouari 53'; Meftah 88' (pen.)	Soccerway report	Demane 4'; Si Ammar 54'	Stadium: Omar Hamadi Stadium; Referee: Missoum Benabdellah

11 September 2019 Round 4	AS Ain M'lila	2–1	MC Oran	Aïn M'lila
16:00	Tiaiba 53'; Demane 64'	Soccerway report	Mesmoudi 76'	Stadium: Zoubir Khelifi Touhami Stadium; Referee: Hamza Bouslimani

16 September 2019 Round 2	AS Ain M'lila	0–0	JS Saoura	Aïn M'lila
16:00		Soccerway report		Stadium: Zoubir Khelifi Touhami Stadium; Referee: Lyés Bekouassa

24 September 2019 Round 5	CA Bordj Bou Arreridj	2–2	AS Aïn M'lila	Bordj Bou Arréridj
18:45	Droueche 53'; Arroussi 62'	Soccerway report	Tiaiba 15', 35'	Stadium: August 20, 1955 Stadium; Referee: Mehdi Abid Charef

28 September 2019 Round 6	AS Ain M'lila	1–1	NC Magra	Aïn M'lila
16:00	Bitam 53'	Soccerway report	Dmigha 84'	Stadium: Zoubir Khelifi Touhami Stadium; Referee: Farouk Mial

6 October 2019 Round 7	NA Hussein Dey	1–1	AS Aïn M'lila	Dar El Beïda (Note: NA Hussein Dey played their home match against AS Aïn M'lila at Omar Benrabah Stadium, Dar El Beïda, instead of their regular stadium Stade 20 Août 1955, Belouizdad, due to renovation.)
16:00	Boultif 0' (o.g.)	Soccerway report	Tiaiba 60' (pen.)	Stadium: Omar Benrabah Stadium; Referee: Ahmed Bouzrar

23 October 2019 Round 8	AS Ain M'lila	3–0	US Biskra	Aïn M'lila
15:00	Dib 17', 27'; Tiaiba 31'	Soccerway report		Stadium: Zoubir Khelifi Touhami Stadium; Referee: Lyés Bekouassa

30 October 2019 Round 9	JS Kabylie	1–0	AS Aïn M'lila	El Harrach (Note: JS Kabylie played two matches instead of their regular stadium Stade 1er Novembre 1954, Tizi Ouzou, due to sanctions.)
15:00	Banouh 9'	Soccerway report		Stadium: November 1, 1954 Stadium; Attendance: 0 (close doors); Referee: Said Aouina

9 November 2019 Round 10	AS Ain M'lila	1–0	ASO Chlef	Aïn M'lila
15:00	Tiaiba 52' (pen.)	Soccerway report		Stadium: Zoubir Khelifi Touhami Stadium; Referee: Hamza Boucetta

23 November 2019 Round 11	CR Belouizdad	1–1	AS Aïn M'lila	Belouizdad
15:00	Khali 84'	Soccerway report	Dahar 10'	Stadium: Stade 20 Août 1955; Referee: Mustapha Ghorbal

30 November 2019 Round 12	AS Ain M'lila	3–0	USM Bel Abbès	Aïn M'lila
15:00	Ibouzidène 56'; Achour 65' (o.g.); Debbih 67'	Soccerway report		Stadium: Zoubir Khelifi Touhami Stadium; Referee: Ahmed Bouzrar

7 December 2019 Round 13	ES Sétif	4–0	AS Aïn M'lila	Sétif
15:00	Touré 23', 32'; Djahnit 45'; Ghacha 85'	Soccerway report		Stadium: Stade 8 Mai 1945; Attendance: 0 (close doors); Referee: Malek Ait Ameur

16 December 2019 Round 14	AS Ain M'lila	0–0	CS Constantine	Aïn M'lila
15:00		Soccerway report		Stadium: Zoubir Khelifi Touhami Stadium; Referee: Abderrezzak Arab

21 December 2019 Round 15	Paradou AC	4–1	AS Aïn M'lila	Bologhine
16:00	Mouali 10'; Redjem 24'; Bouzok 48', 57'	Soccerway report	Tiaiba 69'	Stadium: Omar Hamadi Stadium; Referee: Bilal Bendjahene

1 February 2020 Round 16	AS Ain M'lila	1–0	MC Alger	Aïn M'lila
15:00	Si Ammar 90'	Soccerway report		Stadium: Zoubir Khelifi Touhami Stadium; Attendance: 0 (close doors); Referee: Mustapha Ghorbal

8 February 2020 Round 17	JS Saoura	2–1	AS Aïn M'lila	Béchar
17:00	Farhi 76'; Messaoudi 87'	Soccerway report	Demane 73'	Stadium: Stade 20 Août 1955; Referee: Farouk Mial

17 February 2020 Round 18	AS Aïn M'lila	1–1	USM Alger	Aïn M'lila
15:00	Ziad 71'	Soccerway report	Hamra 53'	Stadium: Zoubir Khelifi Touhami Stadium; Referee: Redouane Necib

22 February 2020 Round 19	MC Oran	3–1	AS Aïn M'lila	Oran
17:00	Benhamou 50'; Abdelhafid 53'; Motrani 71'	Soccerway report	Tiaiba 29'	Stadium: Ahmed Zabana Stadium; Referee: Abdelmoumen Touabti

29 February 2020 Round 20	AS Ain M'lila	2–0	CA Bordj Bou Arreridj	Aïn M'lila
15:00	Tiaiba 53'; Ziad 72'	Soccerway report		Stadium: Zoubir Khelifi Touhami Stadium; Attendance: 0 (close doors); Referee: Houssam Benyahia

7 March 2020 Round 21	NC Magra	0–1	AS Aïn M'lila	Ras El Oued
15:00		Soccerway report	Siam 88'	Stadium: Stade Martyr Al Taher Qidum; Referee: Mehdi Abid Charef

14 March 2020 Round 22	AS Ain M'lila	1–0	NA Hussein Dey	Aïn M'lila
15:00	Tiaiba 90+5'	Soccerway report		Stadium: Zoubir Khelifi Touhami Stadium; Attendance: 0 (close doors); Referee: Nabil Boukhalfa
Note: due to coronavirus outbreak, Ministry of Health, Population and Hospital Reform decided to be all matches played behind closed doors.

Round 23	US Biskra	Cancelled	AS Ain M'lila	Biskra
				Stadium: Stade du 18 Février

Round 24	AS Ain M'lila	Cancelled	JS Kabylie	Aïn M'lila
				Stadium: Zoubir Khelifi Touhami Stadium

Round 25	ASO Chlef	Cancelled	AS Ain M'lila	Chlef
				Stadium: Stade Mohamed Boumezrag

Round 26	AS Ain M'lila	Cancelled	CR Belouizdad	Aïn M'lila
				Stadium: Zoubir Khelifi Touhami Stadium

Round 27	USM Bel Abbès	Cancelled	AS Ain M'lila	Sidi Bel Abbès
				Stadium: Stade 24 Fevrier 1956

Round 28	AS Ain M'lila	Cancelled	ES Sétif	Aïn M'lila
				Stadium: Zoubir Khelifi Touhami Stadium

Round 29	CS Constantine	Cancelled	AS Ain M'lila	Constantine
				Stadium: Stade Mohamed Hamlaoui

Round 30	AS Ain M'lila	Cancelled	Paradou AC	Aïn M'lila
				Stadium: Zoubir Khelifi Touhami Stadium

== Algerian Cup ==
5 January 2020 Round of 64	AS Ain M'lila	1–0 (a.e.t.)	JS Kabylie	Aïn M'lila
14:00	Tiaiba 95' (pen.)	Report		Stadium: Touhami Zoubir Khelifi Stadium; Referee: Lotfi Bekouassa
Note: Lineup for AS Ain M'lila - Hadji, Bitam, Bouhakak, Rabah Ziad, Ibouzidène (Demane, 81'), Guemroud, Debbih, Heriat, Dib (Taib, 102'), Dahar, Tiaiba (Sylla, 120')

18 January 2020 Round of 32	CRB Adrar	1–1 (a.e.t.) (4–5 p)	AS Ain M'lila	Adrar
14:00	Hadj Boubakr 24'	Report	Mousaoui 42' (o.g.)	Stadium: Stade 18 février Referee: Ahmed Bouzrar
	Penalties
	? (penalty scored) ? (penalty scored) ? (penalty missed) ? (penalty scored) ? (penalty scored)		(penalty scored) ? (penalty scored) ? (penalty scored) ? (penalty scored) ? (penalty scored) ?
Note: Lineup for AS Ain M'lila - Hadji, Guemroud, Ibouzidène, Rabah Ziad, Bitam, Bouhakak, Dahar (Si Ammar, 70'), Heriat, Dib, Demane (Debbih, 82'), Tiaiba

13 February 2020 Round of 16	AS Ain M'lila	1–3	CA Bordj Bou Arreridj	Aïn M'lila
15:00	Debbih 70'	Report	Belameiri 24'; Benayad 45'; Djahnit 57'	Stadium: Touhami Zoubir Khelifi Stadium; Referee: Abderrezzak Arab
Note: Lineup for AS Ain M'lila - Hadji, Bitam, Bouhakak, Dahar (Si Ammar, 45'), Guemroud, Rabah Ziad, Tiaiba (Tebbi, 73'), Heriat, Debbih, Taib (Rooney, 60'), Dib

== Squad information ==
=== Playing statistics ===
No.	Pos	Nat	Player	Total		Ligue 1		Algerian Cup	
No.	Pos	Nat	Player	Apps	Goals	Apps	Goals	Apps	Goals
Goalkeepers
1	GK	(Algeria) ALG	Omar Hadji	5	0	2	0	3	0
16	GK	(Algeria) ALG	Abderrahmane Boultif	21	0	21	0	0	0
30	GK	(Algeria) ALG	Tadjeddine Gharbi	0	0	0	0	0	0
Defenders
2	DF	(Algeria) ALG	Rida Bechara	0	0	0	0	0	0
3	DF	(Algeria) ALG	Yasser Kebaili	0	0	0	0	0	0
4	DF	(Algeria) ALG	Abderrezak Bitam	23	1	20	1	3	0
17	DF	(Algeria) ALG	Djamel Ibouzidène	17	1	15	1	2	0
22	DF	(Algeria) ALG	Abdelghani Bouzidi	2	0	2	0	0	0
23	DF	(Algeria) ALG	Mohamed Guemroud	25	0	22	0	3	0
25	DF	(Algeria) ALG	Rabah Ziad	24	0	21	0	3	0
28	DF	(Algeria) ALG	Khaled Bouhakak	21	0	18	0	3	0
Midfielders
5	MF	(Algeria) ALG	Ibrahim Si Ammar	24	2	22	2	2	0
6	MF	(Algeria) ALG	Mohamed Heriat	21	0	18	0	3	0
7	MF	(Algeria) ALG	Mohamed Taib	9	0	7	0	2	0
12	MF	(Algeria) ALG	Hanine Hadjara	0	0	0	0	0	0
14	MF	(Algeria) ALG	Hakim Atchoum	0	0	0	0	0	0
18	MF	(Algeria) ALG	Hamza Ziad	17	1	17	1	0	0
19	MF	(Algeria) ALG	Dhia Eddine Khouni	2	0	2	0	0	0
24	MF	(Algeria) ALG	Merouane Dahar	16	1	13	1	3	0
27	MF	(Burkina Faso) BFA	Ousmane Sylla	14	0	13	0	1	0
Forwards
8	FW	(Algeria) ALG	Walid Hanifi	0	0	0	0	0	0
10	FW	(Algeria) ALG	Chouaib Debbih	19	1	16	1	3	0
13	FW	(Algeria) ALG	Mohamed Tiaiba	25	11	22	10	3	1
21	FW	(Algeria) ALG	Abdeldjalil Layati	3	0	3	0	0	0
20	FW	(Algeria) ALG	Hamza Demane	14	3	12	3	2	0
26	FW	(Algeria) ALG	Brahim Dib	21	3	18	3	3	0
9	FW	(Cameroon) CMR	Rooney Eva Wankewai	4	0	3	0	1	0
	FW	(Algeria) ALG	Oussama Tebbi	4	0	3	0	1	0
Players transferred out during the season
29	MF	(Algeria) ALG	Cherif Siam	16	2	16	2	0	0

Last updated: 11 June 2018
Source: fr.soccerway.com

=== Goalscorers ===
Includes all competitive matches. The list is sorted alphabetically by surname when total goals are equal.

No.	Nat.	Player	Pos.	L 1	AC	TOTAL
13	(Algeria)	Mohamed Tiaiba	FW	10	1	11
20	(Algeria)	Hamza Demane	FW	3	0	3
26	(Algeria)	Brahim Dib	FW	3	0	3
5	(Algeria)	Ibrahim Si Ammar	MF	2	0	2
29	(Algeria)	Cherif Siam	MF	2	0	2
18	(Algeria)	Hamza Ziad	MF	2	0	2
10	(Algeria)	Chouaib Debbih	FW	1	1	2
4	(Algeria)	Abderrezak Bitam	DF	1	0	1
17	(Algeria)	Djamel Ibouzidène	DF	1	0	1
24	(Algeria)	Merouane Dahar	MF	1	0	1
Own Goals				0	1	1
Totals				26	3	29

== Squad list ==
As of 15 August 2019: Note: Flags indicate national team as defined under FIFA eligibility rules; some limited exceptions apply. Players may hold more than one non-FIFA nationality.

No.	Pos.	Nation	Player
1	GK	ALG	Omar Hadji
2	DF	ALG	Rida Bechara
3	DF	ALG	Yasser Kebaili
4	DF	ALG	Abderrezak Bitam
5	MF	ALG	Ibrahim Si Ammar
6	MF	ALG	Mohamed Heriat
7	MF	ALG	Mohamed Taib
8	FW	ALG	Walid Hanifi
10	FW	ALG	Chouaib Debbih
12	MF	ALG	Hanine Hadjara
13	FW	ALG	Mohamed Tiaiba
14	MF	ALG	Hakim Atchoum
16	GK	ALG	Abderrahmane Boultif
17	DF	ALG	Djamel Ibouzidène

No.	Pos.	Nation	Player
18	MF	ALG	Hamza Ziad
19	MF	ALG	Dhia Eddine Khouni
21	FW	ALG	Abdeldjalil Layati
20	FW	ALG	Hamza Demane
22	DF	ALG	Abdelghani Bouzidi
23	DF	ALG	Mohamed Guemroud
24	MF	ALG	Merouane Dahar
25	DF	ALG	Rabah Ziad (captain)
26	FW	ALG	Brahim Dib
27	MF	BFA	Ousmane Sylla
28	DF	ALG	Khaled Bouhakak
29	MF	ALG	Cherif Siam
30	GK	ALG	Tadjeddine Gharbi

== Transfers ==
=== In ===
Date	Pos	Player	from club	Transfer fee	Source
6 July 2019	MF	(Algeria) Hamza Ziad	CA Bordj Bou Arreridj	Free transfer	
6 July 2019	FW	(Algeria) Hamza Demane	DRB Tadjenanet	Free transfer	
7 July 2019	FW	(Algeria) Abdeldjalil Layati	USM El Harrach	Free transfer	
10 July 2019	MF	(Algeria) Mohamed Heriat	Olympique de Médéa	Free transfer	
27 July 2019	FW	(Algeria) Merouane Dahar	MO Béjaïa	Free transfer	
7 August 2019	FW	(Algeria) Ibrahim Dib	Unknown	Free transfer	
23 August 2019	DF	(Canada) Mohamed Farsi	(Canada) AS Blainville	Free transfer	
20 January 2020	ST	(Cameroon) Rooney Eva Wankewai	MC Alger	Loan for six months	
21 January 2020	FW	(Algeria) Oussama Tebbi	ES Sétif	Free transfer (Released)	

=== Out ===
Date	Pos	Player	to club	Transfer fee	Source
4 July 2019	DF	(Algeria) Zineddine Benyahia	CS Constantine	Free transfer	
