= Killian Lokembo =

Belgian footballer

Kilian Lokembo
Personal information
- Full name: Kilian Lokembo Lokaso
- Date of birth: 6 June 2002 (age 24)
- Place of birth: Belgium
- Position: Midfielder

Team information
- Current team: SL16 FC
- Number: 39

Youth career
- Charleroi

Senior career*
Years	Team	Apps	(Gls)
2021	Charleroi	1	(0)
2022–2024	Zébra Élites	63	(1)
2024–	SL16 FC	40	(2)
2024	Standard Liège	1	(0)
- * Club domestic league appearances and goals as of 28 June 2026

Killian Lokembo Lokaso (born 6 June 2002) is a Belgian professional footballer who plays as a midfielder for SL16 FC.

== Club career ==
Killian Lokembo made his professional debut for Charleroi on the 27 December 2021, starting the Division 1A game against OH Leuven as a right-back.

== Private life ==
Killian Lokembo is the son of Fabrice Lokembo, a former Sporting Charleroi player and RDC international.
