= Tarun Karumanchi =

American soccer player (born 2003)

Personal information
- Full name: Tarun Karumanchi
- Date of birth: April 1, 2003 (age 23)
- Place of birth: San Ramon, California, United States
- Height: 5 ft 9 in (1.75 m)
- Position: Midfielder

Team information
- Current team: Columbus Crew
- Number: 50

Youth career
- De Anza Force
- San Jose Earthquakes

College career
| Years | Team | Apps | (Gls) |
| 2022–2025 | UCLA Bruins | 68 | (0) |

Senior career*
| Years | Team | Apps | (Gls) |
| 2025 | Asheville City SC | | |
| 2026– | Columbus Crew 2 | 6 | (0) |
| 2026 | Columbus Crew (loan) | 2 | (0) |
| 2026– | Columbus Crew | 8 | (0) |
- * Club domestic league appearances and goals as of 02:08, 27 September 2026 (UTC)

Tarun Karumanchi (born April 1, 2003) is an American professional soccer player who plays as a midfielder for Major League Soccer club Columbus Crew.

== Early career and college ==
Tarun Karumanchi is a youth product of De Anza Force and the San Jose Earthquakes Academy. He played college soccer at the University of California, Los Angeles (UCLA) from 2022 to 2025. During his four seasons at UCLA, Karumanchi played in 68 matches and made 61 starts, including four NCAA Tournament appearances. He was part of the Bruins’ Pac-12 regular-season championship team in 2023 and their Big Ten Tournament-winning team in 2025. As a senior in 2025, he started all 19 matches, serving as the team's captain throughout the season while primarily playing as a holding midfielder. After his senior season, he entered into the 2026 MLS SuperDraft.

== Club career ==
During the 2025 college offseason, Karumanchi played for USL League 2 club Asheville City SC.

Karumanchi was selected 49th overall in the 2026 MLS SuperDraft by the Columbus Crew. Following an ankle injury suffered during the 2026 preseason, Karumanchi missed the season opener. Columbus Crew manager Henrik Rydström said Karumanchi "probably would have started the first game" had he been available. Following his recovery from injury, he played in six matches for the Crew's reserve team, before signing a contract with the first team on July 30, 2026. He scored his first goal for Columbus on August 11 in a Leagues Cup game against Pumas UNAM.

== Style of play ==
Karumanchi has been noted for his work ethic, professionalism, and ability to win the ball.
