= Sekou Bangoura (footballer) =

Guinean footballer (born 2002)

Sekou Tidiany Bangoura
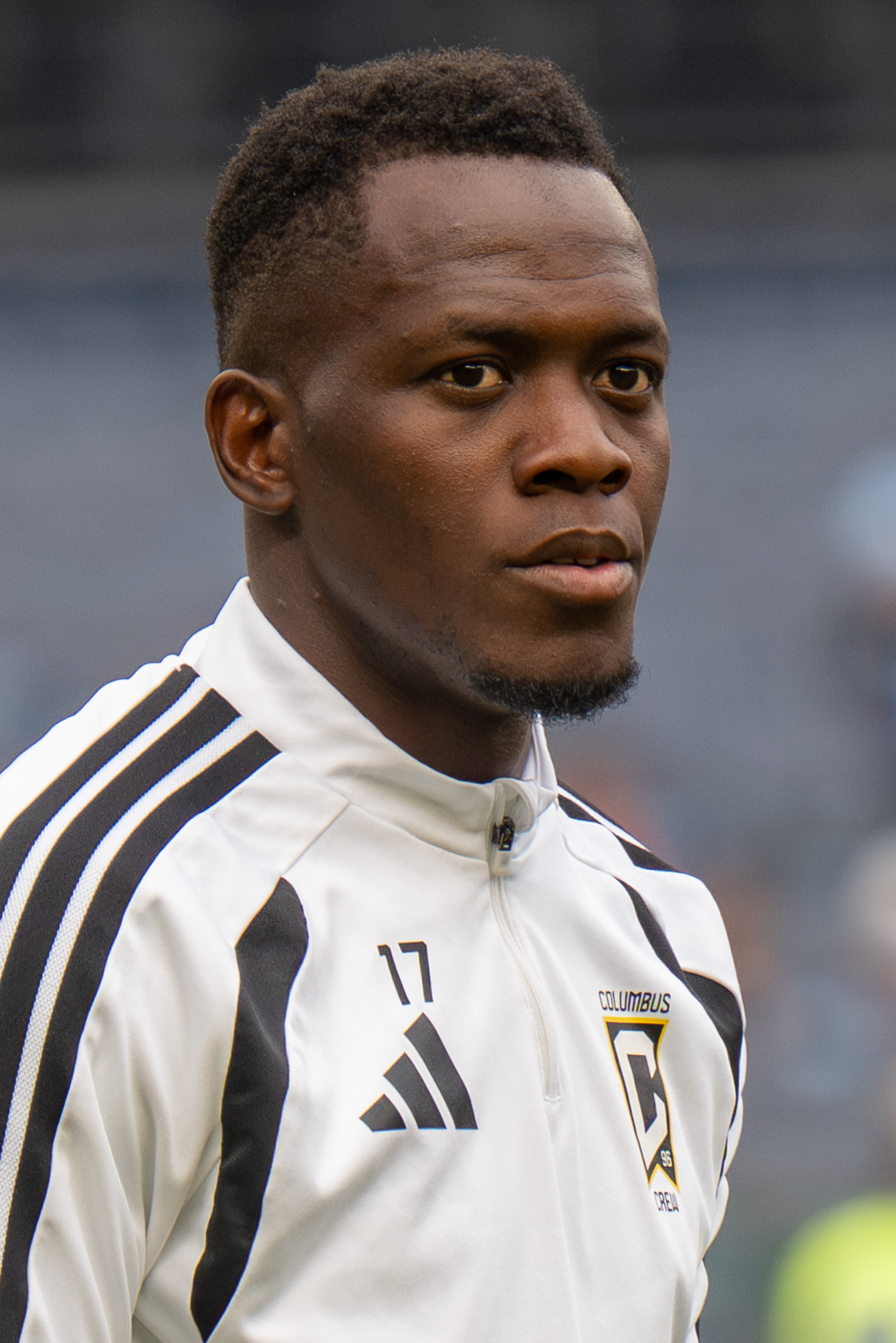
- Bangoura with the Columbus Crew in 2026

Personal information
- Date of birth: 5 April 2002 (age 24)
- Place of birth: Conakry, Guinea
- Height: 1.72 m (5 ft 8 in)
- Position: Midfielder

Team information
- Current team: Columbus Crew
- Number: 17

Youth career
- Atlantic
- 2020–2021: İstanbul Başakşehir

Senior career*
Years	Team	Apps	(Gls)
2021–2025	İstanbul Başakşehir	0	(0)
2021–2022	→ Jammerbugt (loan)	14	(4)
2023	→ Gençlerbirliği (loan)	7	(0)
2023–2024	→ Tuzlaspor (loan)	30	(1)
2024–2025	→ Kiryat Shmona (loan)	24	(1)
2025–2026	Kiryat Shmona	10	(0)
2026–	Columbus Crew	23	(1)

International career^{‡}
2019	Guinea U17	5	(0)
2023–2024	Guinea U23	3	(0)
2025–	Guinea	1	(1)
- * Club domestic league appearances and goals as of 8 November 2026 ‡ National team caps and goals as of 22:00, 16 November 2025 (UTC)

Sekou Tidiany Bangoura (born 25 April 2002) is a Guinean professional footballer who plays as a midfielder for Major League Soccer club Columbus Crew and the Guinea national team.

== Club career ==
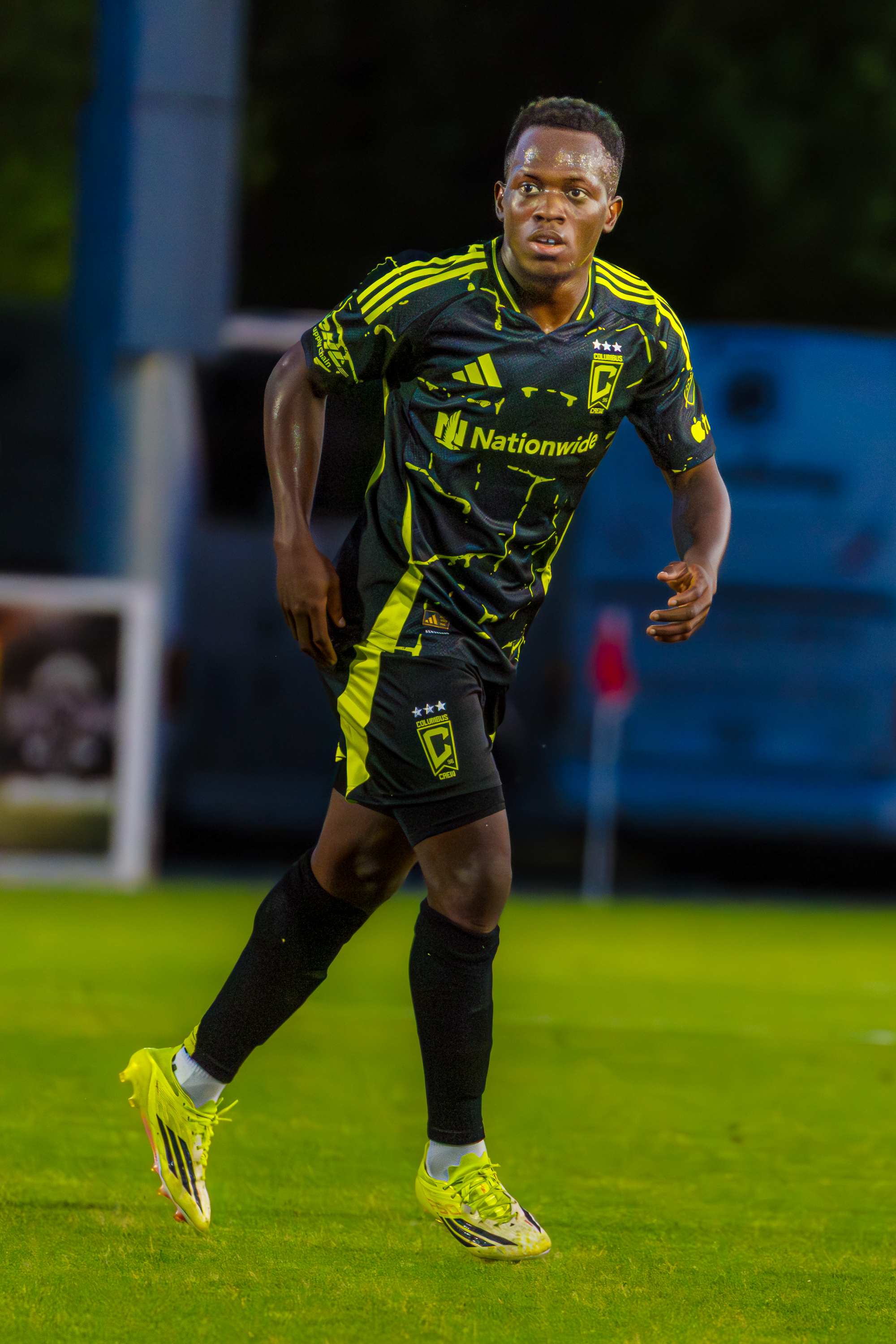
Bangoura with the Columbus Crew in 2026

A youth product of the Guinean club Atlantic, Bangoura moved to the reserve team of Turkish club İstanbul Başakşehir in April 2020 for 2 years before being loaned to Danish second-tier club Jammerbugt FC in February 2022. On the final game of the season, he scored with a long-range effort from 33 yards. He was loaned to Turkish second-tier clubs Gençlerbirliği in February 2023 and Tuzlaspor in September 2023. On 12 July 2024, he joined Kiryat Shmona of the Israeli Premier League on a season-long loan. Kiryat Shmona exercised their purchase option and signed him permanently on 16 May 2025.

On 6 January 2026, Sekou signed with Major League Soccer club Columbus Crew with a contract through June 2029 and an option for a further year.

== International career ==
Bangoura was called up to the Guinea U17s for the 2019 U-17 Africa Cup of Nations, where they finished as runners-up to Cameroon. He played for the Guinea U23s at the 2023 U-23 Africa Cup of Nations. He was a late addition for the U23s at the 2024 Summer Olympics.

Bangoura was called up to the senior Guinea national team for a set of friendlies in November 2025. He scored on his debut, a 2–0 win over Liberia on 16 November 2025.
