= 2012 Trinidad and Tobago League Cup =

2012 First Citizens Cup
Trinidad and Tobago League Cup

Tournament details
- Country: Trinidad and Tobago
- Teams: 8

Final positions
- Champions: Caledonia AIA
- Runners-up: Defence Force

Tournament statistics
- Matches played: 7
- Goals scored: 15 (2.14 per match)
- Top goal scorer: Richard Roy (3 goals)

Awards
- Best player: Trayon Bobb

The 2012 Trinidad and Tobago League Cup was the thirteenth season of the First Citizens Cup, which is the league cup competition for Trinidad and Tobago teams competing in the TT Pro League. Caledonia AIA entered as the cup holders having defeated T&TEC by a score of 2–1 in the 2011 final. Continuing from previous seasons, the slogan for the year's league cup was No Room for Losers and was sponsored by First Citizens Bank for the twelfth consecutive year. To keep with the tag-line, the year's edition only rewarded prizes to the cup winners and runner-up.

== Qualification ==
With the number of participating clubs in the TT Pro League increasing from six to eight over the 2011 edition of the First Citizens Cup, the format of the cup returned to a knockout tournament with all eight teams entering at the quarterfinal round. The draw for the quarterfinals took place on 19 September 2012 at the First Citizens corporate box in Queen's Park Oval. With W Connection participating in the 2012–13 CONCACAF Champions League the club did not participate in the opening weekend of the 2012–13 Pro League season. Therefore, the results from the first round of matches in the league were not considered for seeding in this year's edition of the league cup.

As the Morvant/Laventille Stallions entered the competition as the defending league cup winners they were the first to draw from eight secretly numbered cards respective to spots in the quarterfinal round. Caledonia AIA's Kareem Joseph was immediately followed by T&TEC midfielder Keeron Benito who drew the card that pitted the Electricity Boys against the defending champion at Hasely Crawford Stadium. The other quarterfinal match-ups following the draw resulted in North East Stars and St. Ann's Rangers also facing at the National Stadium, whereas W Connection drew Police and Defence Force encountering Pro League newcomer Central FC in the club's inaugural match at Manny Ramjohn Stadium in Marabella.

== Schedule ==
The schedule for the 2012 First Citizens Cup, as announced by the TT Pro League:

Round	Date	Matches	Clubs	New entries this round
Quarterfinals	21 September 2012	4	8 → 4	8: 1st–8th
Semifinals	28 September 2012	2	4 → 2	
Final	5 October 2012	1	2 → 1	

== Bracket ==
Quarterfinals; 21 September 2012
North East Stars	1
St. Ann's Rangers	2
Defence Force	3
Central FC	0
T&TEC	0
Caledonia AIA	2
W Connection	0 (3)
Police	0 (0)

Semifinals; 28 September 2012
St. Ann's Rangers	1
Defence Force	2
Caledonia AIA	1
W Connection	0

Final; 5 October 2012
Defence Force	1
Caledonia AIA	2

== Results ==
All matches were played for 90 minutes duration, at the end of which if the match was still tied, penalty-kicks were used to determine the match winner.

=== Quarterfinals ===
The quarterfinal round began with a stunning upset from St. Ann's Rangers defeating North East Stars 2–1 in the cup opener. The Rangers used a 70th-minute goal from Devon Modeste to separate the two teams at Hasely Crawford Stadium. In addition, Defence Force ousted Pro League newcomer Central FC 3–0 with goals from the Army's new strike partnership Ro-Jo consisting of Richard Roy and Devorn Jorsling. Caledonia AIA defeated T&TEC with a scoreline of 2–0 earlier at Manny Ramjohn Stadium. The last quarterfinal match saw a goalless performance between W Connection and Police with the Savonetta Boys winning the match 3–1 in a penalty shootout.

21 September 2012	North East Stars	1–2	St. Ann's Rangers	Mucurapo, Trinidad
18:00 (UTC-4)	Glen 67'	Report	Marcano 28'; Modeste 70'	Stadium: Hasely Crawford Stadium; Referee: Gyasi McDonald

21 September 2012	W Connection	0–0 (3–1 p)	Police	Marabella, Trinidad
18:00 (UTC-4)				Stadium: Manny Ramjohn Stadium

21 September 2012	T&TEC	0–2	Caledonia AIA	Mucurapo, Trinidad
20:00 (UTC-4)		Report	Edwards 5'; Holder 9'	Stadium: Hasely Crawford Stadium

21 September 2012	Defence Force	3–0	Central FC	Marabella, Trinidad
20:00 (UTC-4)	Roy 48', 70'; Jorsling 90'			Stadium: Manny Ramjohn Stadium

=== Semifinals ===
In a rematch of the final in the 2012 CFU Club Championship, Caledonia AIA defeated W Connection 1–0 with a goal from Keyon Edwards in the 89th minute to secure a place in the First Citizens Cup final for the Morvant/Laventille Stallions. In the earlier semifinal match on 28 September 2012 at Hasely Crawford Stadium, Defence Force won by a scoreline of 2–1 over St. Ann's Rangers. The Teteron Boys returned to the final for the first time since 2010 with a pair of goals from Trinidad and Tobago international players Jerwyn Balthazar and Kevon Carter.

28 September 2012	St. Ann's Rangers	1–2	Defence Force	Mucurapo, Trinidad
18:00 (UTC-4)	Modeste 83' (pen.)	Report	Balthazar 67'; Carter 78'	Stadium: Hasely Crawford Stadium; Referee: Gyasi McDonald

28 September 2012	Caledonia AIA	1–0	W Connection	Mucurapo, Trinidad
20:00 (UTC-4)	Edwards 89'	Report		Stadium: Hasely Crawford Stadium

=== Final ===
The final was contested between the previous year's First Citizens Cup holder Caledonia AIA and two-time league cup winner Defence Force on 5 October 2012. The match began fairly even between the two sides for the first 19 minutes until the lights dimmed. After conferral with both managers, referee Neal Brizan decided to continue the match under the playing conditions. In the 22nd minute, Jamal Gay latched onto a Trayon Bobb cross to make it 1–0 for Caledonia AIA. Shortly after the opening goal, Richard Roy leveled the score at 1–1 with a goal in the 28th minute. Just four minutes into the second half, Caledonia AIA reclaimed the lead as Keyon Edwards drifted wide and delivered a pass to Trayon Bobb who clipped goalkeeper Kevin Graham to score the winning goal for Caledonia AIA. Guyanese international player Trayon Bobb was named the most valuable player of the tournament having set-up the first goal and scoring the winning goal to lead Caledonia AIA to its two consecutive league cups.

5 October 2012	Defence Force	1–2	Caledonia AIA	Mucurapo, Trinidad
20:00 (UTC-4)	Roy 28'	Report	Gay 22'; Bobb 46'	Stadium: Hasely Crawford Stadium; Attendance: 2,000; Referee: Neal Brizan
