= 2017 Trinidad and Tobago League Cup =

2017 First Citizens Cup
Trinidad and Tobago League Cup

Tournament details
- Country: Trinidad and Tobago
- Teams: 10

Final positions
- Champions: W Connection
- Runners-up: Defence Force

Tournament statistics
- Matches played: 10
- Goals scored: 31 (3.1 per match)
- Top goal scorer: Jorsling 3 goals

The 2017 Trinidad and Tobago League Cup (known for sponsorship reasons as the 2017 First Citizens Cup) was the eighteenth season of the First Citizens Cup, which is the league cup competition for Trinidad and Tobago teams competing in the TT Pro League. Defence Force entered as the cup holders having defeated Ma Pau Stars by a score of 1–0 in the 2016 final. First Citizens Bank changed the slogan to "Where Winners Reign" due to the amount of money that the winner of the tournament would obtain. Teams were drawn into numbers with respect to their position in the 2017 TT Pro League at the time of the draw. It means that teams from 7–10 in the league enter at the play-offs, while from 1–6 enter at the quarterfinal stage. W Connection were crowned 8-time champions after defeating Defence Force in the final.

== Draw Numbers ==
The teams were drawn into their respective league position at the time of the draw.

1. North East Stars
2. W Connection
3. Club Sando
4. Defence Force
5. San Juan Jabloteh
6. Morvant Caledonia United
7. Central
8. Police
9. Point Fortin Civic
10. St. Ann's Rangers

== Results ==
=== Play-off round ===
The setup for the tournament.

11 October 2016	Central	2–1	St. Ann's Rangers	Couva
18:00 (UTC-4)	Marcano 60'; John 90+2'	Report	Toussaint 69'	Stadium: Ato Boldon Stadium

11 October 2016	Police	0–0 (1–4 p)	Point Fortin Civic	Couva
20:00 (UTC-4)		Report		Stadium: Ato Boldon Stadium
	Penalties
	Ryan (penalty scored); Mc Fee (penalty missed); Kirton (penalty missed)		Mitchell (penalty scored); García (penalty scored); Henry (penalty scored); Thomas (penalty scored)

=== Quarterfinals ===
The quarterfinals began with a double header at the Ato Boldon Stadium where Club Sando made a come from behind win against Morvant Caledonia United. It set the seen for an enthralling game between Defence Force and San Juan Jabloteh which ended 3-3 with 'the Army' advancing to the semis. A surprise result happened the following day with Point Fortin Civic knocking out North East Stars. The final game of the quarters was the 'Couva Classico' where 'The Savonetta Boys' beat Central to face Club Sando in the semis.

14 October 2017 A	North East Stars	0–1	Point Fortin Civic	Malabar
15:30 (UTC-4)		Report	Mitchell 49'	Stadium: Larry Gomes Stadium

15 October 2017 B	W Connection	3–1	Central	Marabella
15:30 (UTC-4)	Benjamin 37'; Silva Couto 59'; Diaz 90+1'	Report	Gordon 45+1'	Stadium: Mannie Ramjohn Stadium

13 October 2017 C	Club Sando	3–1	Morvant Caledonia United	Couva
18:00 (UTC-4)	Armstrong 36' (pen.), 88'; Trimmingham 42'	Report	Daniel 33'	Stadium: Ato Boldon Stadium

13 October 2017 D	Defence Force	3–3 (4–2 p)	San Juan Jabloteh	Couva
20:00 (UTC-4)	Moore 26'; Arcia 80'; Jorsling 90+1'	Report	Hutchinson 69', 72'; Simpson 86'	Stadium: Ato Boldon Stadium
	Penalties
	Jorsling (penalty scored); Arcia (penalty scored); Gonzales (penalty scored); King (penalty scored)		Manners (penalty scored); Hinkson (penalty scored); Benjamin (penalty missed); David (penalty missed)

=== Semi-finals ===
Goalkeeper Andre Marchan epitomised the true heart-of-a-soldier when, limping through injury, he made three saves in a nail-biting penalty shootout against Point Fortin Civic on Friday night to put Defence Force one win away from successfully defending the First Citizens Cup. In a scintillating contest fit for a final, Defence Force surfaced 4-3 penalty winners over Civic following a dramatic 3-3 draw in semi-final one at the Ato Boldon Stadium, before Connection left it late to dispatch 10-men Club Sando 2-0 in semi-final two with a goal each from Neil Benjamin Jr. and substitute Daniel Diaz.

3 November 2017 M	Point Fortin Civic	3–3 (3–4 p)	Defence Force	Couva
18:00 (UTC-4)	Henry 11'; Gregory 37'; Mitchell 53' (pen.)	Report	Jorsling 17', 40'; Balthazar 90+3'	Stadium: Ato Boldon Stadium
	Penalties
	Mitchell (penalty scored); García (penalty missed); Henry (penalty scored); Rouse (penalty missed); Campbell (penalty scored); Bass (penalty missed)		Arcia (penalty scored); Gonzales (penalty scored); Moore (penalty missed); King (penalty scored); Jorsling (penalty missed); Mc Intyre (penalty scored)

3 November 2017 N	W Connection	2–0	Club Sando	Couva
20:00 (UTC-4)	Benjamin 69'; Diaz 82'	Report		Stadium: Ato Boldon Stadium

=== Third-place match ===
17 November 2017	Point Fortin Civic	1–1 (3–4 p)	Club Sando	Couva
18:00 (UTC-4)	García 45'	Report	Redhead 85'	Stadium: Ato Boldon Stadium
	Penalties
	Mitchell (penalty scored); García (penalty scored); Sadoo (penalty missed); Campbell (penalty scored); Joseph (penalty missed)		Stephens (penalty missed); Rivers (penalty scored); Russell (penalty scored); Trimmingham (penalty scored); Charles (penalty scored)

=== Final ===
Suriname international Dimitrie Apai picked up the Final’s MVP and Best Forward honours while his side W Connection celebrated a record-extending eighth First Citizens Cup by dethroning Defence Force 3-1 on Friday night at the Ato Boldon Stadium in Couva.

17 November 2017	Defence Force	1–3	W Connection	Couva
20:00 (UTC-4)	Arcia 14'	Report	Apai 19', 85'; Hector 24'	Stadium: Ato Boldon Stadium; Referee: Rashby Mc Phie
