= 2009 Trinidad and Tobago League Cup =

2009 First Citizens Cup
Trinidad and Tobago League Cup

Tournament details
- Country: Trinidad and Tobago
- Teams: 11

Final positions
- Champions: Defence Force
- Runners-up: Joe Public

Tournament statistics
- Matches played: 10
- Goals scored: 34 (3.4 per match)
- Top goal scorer(s): Devorn Jorsling; Richard Roy (3 goals)

The 2009 Trinidad and Tobago League Cup was the tenth season of the First Citizens Cup, which is the league cup competition for Trinidad and Tobago teams competing in the TT Pro League. Continuing from previous seasons, the slogan for the year's league cup was No Room for Losers and was sponsored by First Citizens Bank for the ninth consecutive year. To keep with the tag-line, this year's edition will only reward prizes to the cup winners and runner-up. The Savonetta Boys of W Connection entered as the five-time defending cup holders by winning the 2008 league cup over Joe Public 6–5 in a penalty shootout after the match ended 2–2 in regulation.

== Qualification ==
Seeding for the competition was determined from the league standings following the twentieth league match day. The bottom two teams, Tobago United and Police, were placed in the 10th place playoff to determine who would advance to face Defence Force in one of two qualifying round matches, with the other game matching St. Ann's Rangers up with FC South End.

The two teams that win their respective quarterfinal matches will meet up with the top six teams in the Pro League. The automatic quarterfinal qualifiers in order of league position are: Joe Public, Caledonia AIA, Ma Pau, San Juan Jabloteh, United Petrotrin, and W Connection.

== Schedule ==
The schedule for the 2009 First Citizens Cup, as announced by the TT Pro League:

Round	Date	Matches	Clubs	New entries this round
10th place playoff	1 September 2009	1	11 → 10	2: 10th–11th
Qualifying round	11 September 2009	2	10 → 8	3: 7th–9th
Quarterfinals	18 September 2009	4	8 → 4	6: 1st–6th
Semifinals	25 September 2009	2	4 → 2	
Final	2 October 2009	1	2 → 1	

== Bracket ==
10th place playoff 1 September 2009
10	Tobago United	3
11	Police	1

Qualifying round 11 September 2009
8	St. Ann's Rangers	2 (2)
9	FC South End	2 (0)
7	Defence Force	2
10	Tobago United	1

Quarterfinals; 18 September 2009
1	Joe Public	5
8	St. Ann's Rangers	1
4	San Juan Jabloteh	2
5	United Petrotrin	1
3	Ma Pau	3
6	W Connection	1
2	Caledonia AIA	2
7	Defence Force	3

Semifinals; 25 September 2009
1	Joe Public	2
4	San Juan Jabloteh	0
3	Ma Pau	0
7	Defence Force	2

Final; 2 October 2009
1	Joe Public	0
7	Defence Force	1

== Results ==
All matches were played for 90 minutes duration, at the end of which if the match was still tied, penalty-kicks were used to determine the match winner.

=== 10th place playoff ===
The knockout cup began with the 10th place playoff between the bottom two clubs in the 2009 season following Match Day 20, Tobago United and Police, on 1 September at Plymouth Recreation Grounds. The Tobago Boys came out on top by a score of 3–1 following goals from Collie Hercules, Benjamin Bottino, and Dwayne Jack.

1 September 2009	Tobago United	3–1	Police	Plymouth, Tobago
18:00 (UTC-4)	Hercules 19'; Bottino 54'; Jack 60'		Danclair 28'	Stadium: Plymouth Recreation Grounds

=== Qualifying round ===
St. Ann's Rangers used three saves from Haitian Fortunato Valcourt from penalty kicks to defeat FC South End and advanced to face top-seed Joe Public. In the earlier match, Defence Force scored two first half goals on its way past Tobago United by a 2–1 score into the quarterfinals to face Caledonia AIA.

11 September 2009	St. Ann's Rangers	2–2 (2–0 p)	FC South End	Couva, Trinidad
19:00 (UTC-4)	Hamilton 53'; Modeste 55'		Rougier 11'; Etienne 86'	Stadium: Ato Boldon Stadium; Referee: Gordon Maloney
	Penalties
	Belgrave (penalty scored); Narine (penalty missed); Modeste (penalty missed); Thomas (penalty missed); Bristol (penalty scored)		Rougier (penalty missed); Etienne (penalty missed); Smart (penalty missed); Bacchus (penalty missed)

11 September 2009	Defence Force	2–1	Tobago United	Couva, Trinidad
17:00 (UTC-4)	Jorsling 21'; Joseph 38'		Jack 74'	Stadium: Ato Boldon Stadium

=== Quarterfinals ===
The biggest surprise of the tournament came in the quarterfinals, when Ma Pau upset the defending champions W Connection at Manny Ramjohn Stadium by a 3–1 score. Joining the Casino Boys were Joe Public, San Juan Jabloteh, and Defence Force into the semifinals.

18 September 2009	Joe Public	5–1	St. Ann's Rangers	Macoya, Trinidad
18:00 (UTC-4)	Tinto 10', 60'; Baptiste 16', 85'; Highley 31'		Morris 25'	Stadium: Marvin Lee Stadium

18 September 2009	Ma Pau	3–1	W Connection	Marabella, Trinidad
20:00 (UTC-4)	Samuel 16'; Britto 72'; Wolfe 90+3' (pen.)	Report	Hector 51'	Stadium: Manny Ramjohn Stadium; Referee: Lee Davis

18 September 2009	San Juan Jabloteh	2–1	United Petrotrin	Marabella, Trinidad
18:00 (UTC-4)	Marcano 45', 60'		Lima 90+2'	Stadium: Manny Ramjohn Stadium; Referee: Gregory Hospidales

18 September 2009	Caledonia AIA	2–3	Defence Force	Macoya, Trinidad
20:00 (UTC-4)	Edwards 7'; Daniel 20' (pen.)		Carter 54'; Jorsling 62' (pen.); Roy 90+2'	Stadium: Marvin Lee Stadium

=== Semifinals ===
On 25 September, Joe Public used goals from Trent Noel and Seon Power to defeat San Juan Jabloteh and book their place in the final. In the other semifinal, Defence Force shutout Ma Pau 2–0 with goals from Richard Roy and Devorn Jorsling.

25 September 2009	Joe Public	2–0	San Juan Jabloteh	Macoya, Trinidad
20:00 (UTC-4)	Noel 35'; Power 39'			Stadium: Marvin Lee Stadium; Referee: Lee Davis

25 September 2009	Ma Pau	0–2	Defence Force	Macoya, Trinidad
18:00 (UTC-4)			Roy 21'; Jorsling 42'	Stadium: Marvin Lee Stadium; Referee: Gregory Hospidales

=== Final ===
The tournament was concluded on 2 October when Defence Force upset Joe Public 1–0 in Marvin Lee Stadium to claim their second First Citizens Cup title and end their six-year trophy drought. On the other hand, Joe Public suffered their second consecutive defeat in the league cup final having lost to W Connection on penalty kicks in last year's edition. Teammates Devorn Jorsling and Richard Roy finished as the tournament's top goal scorers with 3 goals each.

2 October 2009	Joe Public	0–1	Defence Force	Macoya, Trinidad
20:00 (UTC-4)		Report	Roy 84'	Stadium: Marvin Lee Stadium; Referee: Gregory Hospidales
