= 2016 Trinidad and Tobago League Cup =

2016 First Citizens Cup
Trinidad and Tobago League Cup

Tournament details
- Country: Trinidad and Tobago
- Teams: 10

Final positions
- Champions: Defence Force
- Runners-up: Ma Pau Stars

Tournament statistics
- Matches played: 9
- Goals scored: 24 (2.67 per match)
- Top goal scorer: Devorn Jorsling 6 goals

The 2016 Trinidad and Tobago League Cup (known for sponsorship reasons as the 2016 First Citizens Cup) was the seventeenth season of the Trinidad and Tobago League Cup, which is the league cup competition for Trinidad and Tobago teams competing in the TT Pro League. W Connection entered as the cup holders having defeated Central by a score of 2–1 in the 2015 final. First Citizens Bank changed the slogan to "Where Winners Reign" due to the amount of money that the winner of the tournament would obtain. Team were drawn randomly where teams from numbers 7–10 enter at the play-offs, while numbers 1–6 enter at the quarterfinal stage. Defence Force won their 3rd title with a 1–0 win over Ma Pau Stars.

== Draw Numbers ==
1. Police
2. Central
3. St. Ann's Rangers
4. W Connection
5. Point Fortin Civic
6. Morvant Caledonia United
7. Club Sando
8. Defence Force
9. San Juan Jabloteh
10. Ma Pau Stars

== Results ==
=== Play Off Round ===
8 September 2016	San Juan Jabloteh (9)	1–1 (1-3 p)	Ma Pau Stars (10)	Couva, Trinidad and Tobago
20:00 (UTC-4)	Hinkson 81'	Report	Daniel 57'	Stadium: Ato Boldon Stadium
	Penalties
	Trimmingham (penalty scored); Charles (penalty missed); Lewis (penalty missed); Joseph (penalty missed)		John (penalty missed); Mitchell (penalty scored); Navarro (penalty scored); Tinto (penalty scored)

8 November 2016	Club Sando (7)	0–1	Defence Force (8)	Couva, Trinidad and Tobago
18:00 (UTC-4)		Report	Arcia 53'	Stadium: Ato Boldon Stadium

=== Quarterfinals ===
14 November 2016 (A)	Police (1)	4–1	Point Fortin Civic (5)	Couva, Trinidad and Tobago
18:00 (UTC-4)	Riley 3', 84'; Lewis 23'; Thomas 87'	Report	Boatswain 87'	Stadium: Ato Boldon Stadium

12 November 2016 (D)	W Connection (4)	0–0 (0–3 p)	Ma Pau Stars (10)	Couva, Trinidad and Tobago
18:00 (UTC-4)		Report		Stadium: Ato Boldon Stadium
	Penalties
	Hector (penalty missed); Jones (penalty missed); Frederick (penalty missed)		Baptiste (penalty scored); Edwards (penalty scored); Tinto (penalty scored)

13 November 2016 (B)	Central (2)	0–0 (2–3 p)	Morvant Caledonia United (6)	Morvant, Trinidad and Tobago
15:30 (UTC-4)		Report		Stadium: Morvant Recreational Ground; Attendance: 2,500
	Penalties
	Marcano (penalty missed); Paul (penalty scored); Mitchell (penalty scored); Cummings (penalty missed) de Silva (penalty missed)		Joseph (penalty scored); Joseph (penalty scored); Neptune (penalty scored); Armstrong (penalty missed)

12 November 2016 (C)	St. Ann's Rangers (3)	2–4	Defence Force (8)	Couva, Trinidad and Tobago
16:00 (UTC-4)	King 53'; Lee 72'	Report	Jorsling 11' (pen.), 19', 50', 84'	Stadium: Ato Boldon Stadium

=== Semi-finals ===
27 November 2016	Police (1)	3–3 (2–3 p)	Ma Pau Stars (10)	Couva, Trinidad and Tobago
18:00 (UTC-4)	Mc David 34'; Belgrave 45+', 85'	Report	Caruth 37' (o.g.); Scotland 52', 79'	Stadium: Ato Boldon Stadium
	Penalties
	Ryan (penalty missed); Thomas (penalty missed); O'Neil (penalty scored); Mc David (penalty scored); Belgrave (penalty missed)		Batiste (penalty scored); Edwards (penalty scored); Tinto (penalty missed); Gerrard Mitchell (penalty missed); Navarro (penalty scored)

27 November 2016	Morvant Caledonia United (6)	0–3	Defence Force (8)	Couva, Trinidad and Tobago
16:00 (UTC-4)		Report	Jorsling 45', 46', 68' (pen.)	Stadium: Ato Boldon Stadium

=== Final ===
2 December 2016	Defence Force (8)	1–0	Ma Pau Stars (10)	Port of Spain, Trinidad and Tobago
20:00 (UTC-4)	Edwards 14'			Stadium: Hasely Crawford Stadium; Attendance: 1,300
