= 2008 Trinidad and Tobago League Cup =

2008 First Citizens Cup
Trinidad and Tobago FCB Cup

Tournament details
- Country: Trinidad and Tobago
- Teams: 10

Final positions
- Champions: W Connection
- Runners-up: Joe Public

Tournament statistics
- Matches played: 10
- Goals scored: 36 (3.6 per match)
- Top goal scorer(s): Gregory Richardson (4 goals)

The 2008 Trinidad and Tobago League Cup was the ninth season of the First Citizens Cup, which is the league cup competition for Trinidad and Tobago teams competing in the TT Pro League. The slogan for the year's league cup was No Room for Losers and was sponsored by First Citizens Bank for the eighth consecutive year. W Connection entered as the defending champions after having defeated Caledonia AIA 2–0 in the 2007 final for their fourth consecutive league cup title.

== Qualification ==
Seeding for the competition was determined from the league standings following the eighteenth league match day. The bottom four teams were placed in the qualifying round to determine which teams advance to the quarterfinals. The teams ranked from first to sixth advanced directly to the quarterfinals.

The automatic quarterfinal qualifiers in order of league position were: San Juan Jabloteh, W Connection, Caledonia AIA, United Petrotrin, Joe Public, and St. Ann's Rangers.

== Schedule ==
The schedule for the 2008 First Citizens Cup, as announced by the TT Pro League:

Round	Date	Matches	Clubs	New entries this round
Qualifying round	2 September 2008	2	10 → 8	4: 7th–10th
Quarterfinals	12 September 2008	4	8 → 4	6: 1st–6th
Semifinals	19 September 2008	2	4 → 2	
Third place	26 September 2008	1	2 → 1	
Final	26 September 2008	1	2 → 1	

== Bracket ==
Qualifying round 2 September 2008
9	Ma Pau	1
10	Tobago United	2
7	North East Stars	1 (0)
8	Defence Force	1 (3)

Quarterfinals; 12 September 2008
1	San Juan Jabloteh	2
10	Tobago United	0
4	United Petrotrin	2
5	Joe Public	4
3	Caledonia AIA	3 (3)
6	St. Ann's Rangers	3 (4)
2	W Connection	5
8	Defence Force	2

Semifinals; 19 September 2008
1	San Juan Jabloteh	0
5	Joe Public	1
6	St. Ann's Rangers	0
2	W Connection	2

Final; 26 September 2008
5	Joe Public	2 (5)
2	W Connection	2 (6)
Third place
1	San Juan Jabloteh	1
6	St. Ann's Rangers	2

== Results ==
All matches were played for 90 minutes duration, at the end of which if the match was still tied, penalty-kicks were used to determine the match winner.

=== Qualifying round ===
The knockout cup began in the qualifying round with Tobago United and Defence Force recording upsets over higher-seeded Ma Pau and North East Stars respectively.

2 September 2008	Tobago United	2–1	Ma Pau	Malabar, Trinidad
17:00 (UTC-4)	Hercules 68' (pen.); Hernandez 82'		Proctor 19'	Stadium: Larry Gomes Stadium; Referee: Gordon Maloney

2 September 2008	North East Stars	1–1 (0–3 p)	Defence Force	Malabar, Trinidad
19:00 (UTC-4)	Teesdale 60'		Jorsling 50'	Stadium: Larry Gomes Stadium
	Penalties
	Stewart (penalty missed); Cooper (penalty missed); Jeffrey (penalty missed)		Pierre (penalty scored); Jorsling (penalty scored); Williams (penalty scored)

=== Quarterfinals ===
Fans saw a goal spree in the quarterfinals where 22 goals were scored in four matches on 12 September, which saw Jabloteh, Joe Public, Rangers, and W Connection advance to the semifinals.

12 September 2008	San Juan Jabloteh	2–0	Tobago United	Malabar, Trinidad
18:00 (UTC-4)	Noel 14' (pen.); Forbes 87'			Stadium: Larry Gomes Stadium

12 September 2008	United Petrotrin	2–4	Joe Public	Marabella, Trinidad
18:00 (UTC-4)	Aguillera 11'; Woodley 18'		Richardson 5', 19', 26'; Calderon 44'	Stadium: Manny Ramjohn Stadium; Referee: Phillip Jordan

12 September 2008	St. Ann's Rangers	3–3 (4–3 p)	Caledonia AIA	Malabar, Trinidad
20:00 (UTC-4)	Thomas 37'; Edwards 41'; Belgrave 53' (pen.)		Moore 6'; Smith 18', 26'	Stadium: Larry Gomes Stadium

12 September 2008	W Connection	5–2	Defence Force	Marabella, Trinidad
20:00 (UTC-4)	Hector 15', 53'; Faña 40'; Viana 43'; Toussaint 89'		Williams 6'; Carter 57'	Stadium: Manny Ramjohn Stadium

=== Semifinals ===
On 19 September 2008, Joe Public used a lone goal from Gregory Richardson to advance to the final. In the other semifinal, W Connection blanked St. Ann's Rangers after goals from Jonathan Faña and Atiba McKnight on either side of half-time.

19 September 2008	San Juan Jabloteh	0–1	Joe Public	Marabella, Trinidad
20:00 (UTC-4)		Report	Richardson 48'	Stadium: Manny Ramjohn Stadium; Referee: Austin Perelion

19 September 2008	W Connection	2–0	St. Ann's Rangers	Marabella, Trinidad
18:00 (UTC-4)	Faña 8'; McKnight 74'	Report		Stadium: Manny Ramjohn Stadium

=== Third place ===
With wins by Joe Public and W Connection in the semifinals; San Juan Jabloteh and St. Ann's Rangers were sent to the third place match. Before the final match, St. Ann's Rangers used strikes from Keyon Edwards and Josimar Belgrave in two minutes to put away top seeded San Juan Jabloteh for a third-place finish.

26 September 2008	San Juan Jabloteh	1–2	St. Ann's Rangers	Marabella, Trinidad
18:00 (UTC-4)	Marcano 67'	Report	Edwards 60'; Belgrave 61'	Stadium: Manny Ramjohn Stadium; Referee: Julien Drayton

=== Final ===
W Connection claimed their fifth consecutive title and sixth overall in the tournament's nine-year history with a win over Joe Public in the final. The match was held on 26 September in Manny Ramjohn Stadium. After being dead-locked 2–2 at the end of regulation, W Connection used a miss by Joe Public's Jason Springer on the twelfth kick from the penalty spot to win 6–5 in the shootout. Although Joe Public finished runners-up, Gregory Richardson led the tournament with four goals scored.

26 September 2008	W Connection	2–2 (6–5 p)	Joe Public	Marabella, Trinidad
20:00 (UTC-4)	Toussaint 18'; Faña 35'	Report	Harvey 11'; Thomas 55'	Stadium: Manny Ramjohn Stadium; Referee: Gregory Hospedales
	Penalties
	Faña (penalty scored); Toussaint (penalty scored); Seabra (penalty scored); Viveros (penalty missed); Joseph (penalty scored); Cupid (penalty scored); McKnight (penalty scored)		Baptiste (penalty scored); Dwarika (penalty missed); Harvey (penalty scored); Saunders (penalty scored); Wolfe (penalty scored); Thomas (penalty scored); Springer (penalty missed)
