= 2018 Trinidad and Tobago League Cup group stage =

The group stage for the First Citizens Cup began on 8 June.

== Groups ==
The teams were drawn into 2 groups of 5 teams, who will play each other once. The top two teams will advance to the semifinals.

All times U.S. Eastern Daylight Time (UTC−4)

=== Group Immortelle ===
Story of Round 1.

Story of Round 2.

Story of Round 5.

10 June 2018
16:00

St. Ann's Rangers	0–2	Central
	Report	Armstrong 41', 68'

Ato Boldon Stadium

10 June 2018
18:00

San Juan Jabloteh	0–4	Defence Force
	Report	King 12', 67'; Moore 14'; Sam 73'

Ato Boldon Stadium

18 June 2018
18:30

Defence Force	7–2	St. Ann's Rangers
King 20'; Garcia 52'; Sam 56'; Moore 59'; Jorsling 62'; Quintero 63', 83'	Report	Mayers 38'; Henry 65'

Ato Boldon Stadium

18 June 2018
20:30

Club Sando	0–0	San Juan Jabloteh
	Report

Ato Boldon Stadium

24 June 2018
16:00

St. Ann's Rangers	0–2	Club Sando
	Report	Piper 65'; Alfred 79'

St. Augustine Secondary Grounds

22 June 2018
18:30

Central	2–1	Defence Force
Charles 1', 46'	Report	Sam 90'

Ato Boldon Stadium

3 July 2018
18:30

Club Sando	2–1	Central
Piper 46'; Basdeo 83'	Report	Gibson 30'

Ato Boldon Stadium

1 July 2018
10 July 2018
16:00
18:00

San Juan Jabloteh	1–2	St. Ann's Rangers
Bonval 70'		Henry 40' (pen.); Bernard 42'

Hasely Crawford Stadium

Final 30 mins were postponed due to weather

6 July 2018
18:00

Central	2–1	San Juan Jabloteh
Muckette 56'; Cummings 67'	Report	Francois 76'

Hasely Crawford Stadium

6 July 2018
20:00

Defence Force	3–0	Club Sando
King 31'; Arcia 78'; Moore 84'	Report

Hasely Crawford Stadium

=== Group Abercrombie ===
Story of round 1

Story of Round 2

8 June 2018
18:30

North East Stars	1–5	Police
Bartholomew 67'	Report	Freitas 16', 28'; Riley 18'; Perry 53', 85'

Ato Boldon Stadium

8 June 2018
20:30

Point Fortin Civic	2–3	W Connection
Paul 2'; Mitchell 9' (pen.)	Report	Joseph 23', 31'; Frederick 86'

Ato Boldon Stadium

16 June 2018
16:00

W Connection	2–0	North East Stars
Hinkson 25'; Joseph 83'	Report

Ato Boldon Stadium

16 June 2018
18:00

Morvant Caledonia United	1–2	Point Fortin Civic
Joseph 90+' (pen.)	Report	García 66'; Sadoo 75'

Ato Boldon Stadium

23 June 2018
16:00

North East Stars	0–2	Morvant Caledonia United
	Report	Ballah 12'; Springer 24'

Larry Gomes Stadium

22 June 2018
20:30

Police	1–0	W Connection
Freitas 71'	Report

Ato Boldon Stadium

10 July 2018
19:00

Morvant Caledonia United	2–0	Police
Francois 13'; Mclean 35'

Hasely Crawford Stadium

3 July 2018
20:30

Point Fortin Civic	4–1	North East Stars
Sadoo 20'; John 40'; Lammy 83'; García 86'	Report	Coryat 65' (pen.)

Ato Boldon Stadium

7 July 2018
16:00

Police	3–0	Point Fortin Civic
Ryan 5'; Thomas 79'; Freitas 86' (pen.)	Report

Ato Boldon Stadium

7 July 2018
18:00

W Connection	1–2	Morvant Caledonia United
Joseph 51'	Report	Joseph 24' (pen.); Edwards 43'

Ato Boldon Stadium

== See also ==
- 2018 First Citizens Cup
