= Trayon Bobb =

Guyanese footballer (born 1993)

Personal information
- Full name: Trayon Denzil Bobb
- Date of birth: 5 November 1993 (age 32)
- Place of birth: Uitvlugt, Guyana
- Height: 1.67 m (5 ft 6 in)
- Position: Left winger

Team information
- Current team: S.U. 1º de Dezembro

Youth career
- 2010: West Demerara

Senior career*
Years	Team	Apps	(Gls)
2010–2013	Caledonia AIA	10	(0)
2013–2014	TP-47	12	(6)
2013	→ RoPS (loan)	3	(0)
2013–2014	→ FK Kruoja (loan)	20	(2)
2014–2015	Caledonia AIA	24	(2)
2015	Georgetown FC		
2015–2017	Slingerz		
2017–2018	Uitvlugt Warriors		
2018–2019	S.U. 1º de Dezembro		

International career^{‡}
2010–2012	Guyana U20	8	(2)
2011–2023	Guyana	51	(12)
- * Club domestic league appearances and goals as of 22 June 2014 ‡ National team caps and goals as of 18 June 2023

Trayon Denzil Bobb (born 5 November 1993) is a Guyanese professional footballer who plays as a left-winger for S.U.1 de Dezembro of the Portuguese Campeonato de Portugal league. He also represented the Guyana national team.

Bobb began his professional football career with Caledonia AIA of the TT Pro League in Trinidad and Tobago in 2011. During his time with the Stallions, Bobb won the FA Trophy in 2011–12 and the CFU Club Championship in 2012. In the middle of his second season with Caledonia AIA, in 2013, Bobb moved to Finland to join TP-47 before moving to RoPS Rovaniemi on a joint-loan agreement. In August 2013, Bobb was loaned to Lithuanian club FK Kruoja for the 2013 and 2014 A Lyga seasons.

He was a Guyana international having made his debut in August 2011.

== Early life ==
Bobb was born in nearby village Uitvlugt of Essequibo Islands-West Demerara, Guyana, which is located on west bank of the Demerara River. Trayon is the younger brother of former Guyana national team defender Orville Bobb Carroll. Bobb began his competitive football career, at the age of 16, for West Demerara during the Guyana Football Federation under-17 inter-association tournament. On 27 March 2010, Bobb dominated a match against East Bank netting four goals, which included a first-half hat-trick. Two months later, West Demerara defeated Georgetown 2–1 in the final of the tournament to claim the title. After scoring seven goals in the competition and finishing as the joint-top goal scorer, Bobb was named the most valuable player of the tournament.

== Club career ==
=== Caledonia AIA ===
Following a series of impressive performances during the Kashif & Shanghai knockout competition in 2010, Trayon followed Guyana national team manager Jamaal Shabazz to Trinidad and Tobago to begin his professional football career for Caledonia AIA of the TT Pro League. Bobb made his debut for the Stallions of Morvant/Laventille during the club's early elimination from the 2011 CFU Club Championship after just four matches. In his first professional season with Caledonia AIA, Bobb made seven league appearances for the club. However, he featured brightly during the club's First Citizens Cup, Lucozade Sport Goal Shield, FA Trophy, Kashif & Shanghai, and CFU Club Championship successes.

Bobb opened the 2012–13 season for Caledonia AIA as a starter in the Stallions' midfield. During the 2012–13 CONCACAF Champions League, he made two appearances for Caledonia during the group stage, including a start against Seattle Sounders FC of Major League Soccer on 2 August. In October 2012, Bobb was named the most valuable player of the First Citizens Cup after having set-up and scoring the winning goal to lead Caledonia AIA to a 2–1 win over Defence Force in the final. The following months, Bobb scored in consecutive rounds during the TOYOTA Classic and provided an additional two goals in an 8–0 win over Petit Valley United in the FA Trophy. On 8 January 2013, Trayon was one of five TT Pro League players invited for a two-week trial with a touring team in Turkey to play practice matches against several European clubs on their winter breaks. Before departing for Turkey, Bobb had made ten league appearances for Caledonia AIA in his two years with the club.

=== Tornion Pallo-47 ===
On 21 February 2013, Bobb agreed to personal terms with TP-47 of Kakkonen, the third-level of association football in Finland. On 13 March, Bobb recorded his first career hat-trick in his debut for TP-47 during the third round of the 2013 Suomen Cup. He went on to make starting appearances the following two rounds before a defeat to TPV ended the Tornio club's run in the fifth round. Bobb recorded his first league goal in his debut for TP-47, on 28 April, to level the match against PK-37 at 2–2 in the 85th minute after scoring from a cross. A week later, Trayon scored his second goal in as many matches in a 2–0 win over Vasa IFK. He scored two more goals over the next five league matches against Tervarit on 19 May and a week later against KPV on 26 May.

==== Loans to RoPS and FK Kruoja (2013–2014) ====
On 1 June, after scoring four goals in seven league appearances for TP-47, Bobb joined Veikkausliiga side RoPS on loan with the agreement to permit Trayon to compete for both clubs during the loan. The following day, Bobb became the first Guyanese to play in a Veikkausliiga match when he made his debut against FF Jaro coming on as a substitute for former Caledonia AIA teammate Ataullah Guerra in the 59th minute. Before returning to TP-47, Bobb made three Veikkausliiga appearances for RoPS. He made his return on 16 June and scored a goal for the Tornio club in a win over GBK Kokkola. Bobb scored again on 21 July with the opening goal during the return match against KPV, which marked his sixth goal in 12 league appearances with TP-47.

On 23 July 2013, Bobb traveled to Lithuania for a one-week trial with FK Kruoja of A Lyga. After a strong performance in an exhibition match and a medical examination, he secured a loan until the end of the 2013 season. Although Bobb had not made an appearance for the club, TP-47 and Kruoja agreed to extend his loan until the end of the 2014 A Lyga season.

Bobb opened the following season with an ankle injury suffered during preseason training that kept him sidelined for FK Kruoja's first eleven league matches. On 8 May 2014, Bobb scored an 84th-minute goal in his debut for Kruoja during a league match against FK Dainava Alytus after coming as a substitute in the 66th minute.

== International career ==
Bobb has represented Guyana on various levels of international competition, having been capped for the under-20 and the Guyana national teams. Considered to be the future of Guyanese football, Bobb has quickly improved since his national team debut and has become a permanent fixture in the senior team.

=== Youth teams ===
He began his international career for the under-20 team during qualification for the 2011 CONCACAF U-20 Championship, where Bobb made three appearances playing as a winger in wins over United States Virgin Islands and Grenada; and a loss to Jamaica. In the second qualification round, Bobb scored his first goal for Guyana in the 81st minute against Netherlands Antilles, which resulted in the Golden Jaguars lone win in the group on 23 January 2011. Prior to elimination, Bobb made six consecutive starts for Guyana during the team's qualification attempt.

In August 2012, Bobb made two additional appearances for the under-20 team during its qualification attempt for the 2013 CONCACAF U-20 Championship. Guyana finished a disappointing third in its group behind neighbors Suriname and Trinidad and Tobago, which eliminated the Golden Jaguars from the competition. However, in the team's first match against Trinidad and Tobago, Bobb scored Guyana's lone goal in an eventual 2–1 loss.

=== Senior team ===
International appearances and goals
#	Date	Venue	Opponent	Result^{†}	Competition	Goal
2011
1	25 August	Providence Stadium, Providence	India	2–1	International match	
2	2 September	Providence Stadium, Providence	Barbados	2–0	2014 FIFA World Cup qualification	
2012
3	19 February	Arnos Vale Stadium, Kingstown	Saint Vincent and the Grenadines	0–1	International match	
4	22 February	Grenada National Stadium, St. George's	Grenada	2–1	International match	
5	29 February	Providence Stadium, Providence	Guatemala	0–2	International match	
6	2 May	Stade Georges-Gratiant, Le Lamentin	Martinique	2–2	International match	
7	4 May	Stade René Serge Nabajoth, Les Abymes	Guadeloupe	2–1	International match	
8	19 May	Montego Bay Sports Complex, Montego Bay	Jamaica	0–1	International match	
9	15 August	Estadio Ramón Tahuichi Aguilera, Santa Cruz de la Sierra	Bolivia	0–2	International match	
10	7 September	Estadio Cuscatlán, San Salvador	El Salvador	2–2	2014 FIFA World Cup qualification	2 (2)
11	11 September	Providence Stadium, Providence	El Salvador	2–3	2014 FIFA World Cup qualification	
12	12 October	BBVA Compass Stadium, Houston	Mexico	0–5	2014 FIFA World Cup qualification	
13	16 October	Estadio Nacional, San José	Costa Rica	0–7	2014 FIFA World Cup qualification	
14	21 October	Beausejour Stadium, Gros Islet	Saint Vincent and the Grenadines	1–2	2012 Caribbean Cup qualification	
15	23 October	Beausejour Stadium, Gros Islet	Curaçao	2–1	2012 Caribbean Cup qualification	
16	25 October	Beausejour Stadium, Gros Islet	Saint Lucia	3–0	2012 Caribbean Cup qualification	
17	14 November	Grenada National Stadium, St. George's	Haiti	0–1	2012 Caribbean Cup qualification	
18	16 November	Grenada National Stadium, St. George's	Grenada	1–2	2012 Caribbean Cup qualification	
19	18 November	Grenada National Stadium, St. George's	French Guiana	4–3	2012 Caribbean Cup qualification	
2015
20	1 February	Barbados National Stadium, Bridgetown	Barbados	2–2	International match	
21	29 March	Providence Stadium, Providence	Grenada	2–0	International match	
22	14 June	Providence Stadium, Providence	Saint Vincent and the Grenadines	4–4	2018 FIFA World Cup qualification	
2016
23	21 February	Providence Stadium, Providence	Suriname	2–0	International match	
24	22 March	Providence Stadium, Providence	Anguilla	7–0	2017 Caribbean Cup qualification	
25	1 June	Ergilio Hato Stadium, Willemstad	Curaçao	5–2	2017 Caribbean Cup qualification	
26	4 June	Addelita Cancryn Junior High School Ground, Charlotte Amalie	U.S. Virgin Islands	7–0	2017 Caribbean Cup qualification	2 (4)
27	8 October	André Kamperveen Stadion, Paramaribo	Suriname	2–3	2017 Caribbean Cup qualification	
28	11 October	Leonora Stadium, Leonora	Jamaica	2–4	2017 Caribbean Cup qualification	
^{†}Guyana's goal tally first.

Bobb made his full international debut for the national team on 25 August 2011, at the age of 18, in a friendly match against India. After impressing in the match, Trayon earned his second cap against Barbados a week later in a 2014 FIFA World Cup qualifier. Bobb continued his solid performances in a series of seven international matches in preparation for the third round of World Cup qualification. On 7 September 2013, Bobb scored a pair of goals on either side of half-time to earn the Golden Jaguars a 2–2 draw against El Salvador in Estadio Cuscatlán. However, the draw would prove to be the lone point for Guyana during the third round. Before elimination, Bobb recorded a total of five caps and scored two goals during Guyana's qualification campaign. Bobb concluded an active year for the Golden Jaguars with six consecutive starts during Guyana's qualification attempt for the 2012 Caribbean Cup in October and November.

== Career statistics ==
=== Club ===
Updated 22 June 2014

Club	Season	League			Cup		League Cup (Note: Includes appearances in the Trinidad and Tobago's Classic, Goal Shield, and Pro Bowl)		Continental (Note: Includes appearances in the CONCACAF Champions League)		Other (Note: Includes appearances in the Trinidad and Tobago Charity Shield and CFU Club Championship)		Total	
Club	Season	Division	Apps	Goals	Apps	Goals	Apps	Goals	Apps	Goals	Apps	Goals	Apps	Goals
Caledonia AIA	2010–11	TT Pro League	0	0	0	0	0	0	0	0	4	0	4	0
Caledonia AIA	2011–12	TT Pro League	7	0	4	0	4	0	0	0	4	0	19	0
Caledonia AIA	2012–13	TT Pro League	3	0	2	2	3	1	2	0	0	0	10	3
Caledonia AIA	Total		10	0	6	2	7	1	2	0	8	0	33	3
TP-47	2013	Kakkonen	12	6	3	3	0	0	0	0	0	0	15	9
TP-47	2014	Kakkonen	0	0	0	0	0	0	0	0	0	0	0	0
TP-47	Total		12	6	3	3	0	0	0	0	0	0	15	9
RoPS (loan)	2013	Veikkausliiga	3	0	0	0	0	0	0	0	0	0	3	0
RoPS (loan)	Total		3	0	0	0	0	0	0	0	0	0	3	0
FK Kruoja (loan)	2013	A Lyga	0	0	0	0	0	0	0	0	0	0	0	0
FK Kruoja (loan)	2014	A Lyga	6	2	0	0	0	0	0	0	0	0	6	2
FK Kruoja (loan)	Total		6	2	0	0	0	0	0	0	0	0	6	2
Career total			31	8	9	5	7	1	2	0	8	0	57	14

=== International ===
Updated 18 November 2019

==== International appearances ====
National team	Year	Friendly		Competitive		Total	
National team	Year	Apps	Goals	Apps	Goals	Apps	Goals
Guyana	2011	1	0	1	0	2	0
Guyana	2012	7	0	10	2	17	2
Guyana	2015	2	0	1	0	3	0
Guyana	2016	1	0	5	2	6	2
Guyana	2017	2	0	0	0	2	0
Guyana	2018	0	0	3	2	3	2
Guyana	2019	1	0	4	4	5	4
Total		14	0	24	10	38	10

==== International goals ====
Scores and results list Guyana's goal tally first.

No.	Date	Venue	Cap	Opponent	Score	Result	Competition
1.	7 September 2012	Estadio Cuscatlán, San Salvador, El Salvador	10	El Salvador	1–1	2–2	2014 FIFA World Cup qualification
2.	7 September 2012	Estadio Cuscatlán, San Salvador, El Salvador	10	El Salvador	2–2	2–2	2014 FIFA World Cup qualification
3.	4 June 2016	Addelita Cancryn Junior High School Ground, Charlotte Amalie, U.S. Virgin Islands	26	U.S. Virgin Islands	1–0	7–0	2017 Caribbean Cup qualification
4.	4 June 2016	Addelita Cancryn Junior High School Ground, Charlotte Amalie, U.S. Virgin Islands	26	U.S. Virgin Islands	6–0	7–0	2017 Caribbean Cup qualification
5.	6 September 2018	Synthetic Track and Field Facility, Leonora, Guyana	31	Barbados	1–0	2–2	2019–20 CONCACAF Nations League qualification
6.	13 October 2018	TCIFA National Academy, Providenciales, Turks and Caicos Islands	32	Turks and Caicos Islands	5–0	8–0	2019–20 CONCACAF Nations League qualification
7.	11 October 2019	Synthetic Track and Field Facility, Leonora, Guyana	36	Antigua and Barbuda	1–0	5–1	2019–20 CONCACAF Nations League B
8.	11 October 2019	Synthetic Track and Field Facility, Leonora, Guyana	36	Antigua and Barbuda	2–0	5–1	2019–20 CONCACAF Nations League B
9.	15 November 2019	Synthetic Track and Field Facility, Leonora, Guyana	37	Aruba	3–2	4–2	2019–20 CONCACAF Nations League B
10.	15 November 2019	Synthetic Track and Field Facility, Leonora, Guyana	37	Aruba	4–2	4–2	2019–20 CONCACAF Nations League B
11.	1 February 2022	Frank Essed Stadion, Paramaribo, Suriname	40	Suriname	1–2	1–2	Friendly
12.	7 June 2022	Synthetic Track and Field Facility, Leonora, Guyana	45	Bermuda	1–0	2–1	2022–23 CONCACAF Nations League

== Honours ==
=== Club ===
Caledonia AIA

- CFU Club Championship (1): 2012
- FA Trophy (1): 2011–12
- First Citizens Cup (2): 2011, 2012
- Lucozade Sport Goal Shield (1): 2012

=== Individual ===
==== Awards ====
- Man of the Match (1): 2012 First Citizens Cup
