= 2011 Trinidad and Tobago League Cup =

2011 First Citizens Cup
Trinidad and Tobago League Cup

Tournament details
- Country: Trinidad and Tobago
- Teams: 6

Final positions
- Champions: Caledonia AIA
- Runners-up: T&TEC

Tournament statistics
- Matches played: 9
- Goals scored: 32 (3.56 per match)
- Top goal scorer(s): Jerrel Britto; Jamal Gay; Hughton Hector; Willis Plaza (3 goals)

The 2011 First Citizens Cup was the twelfth season of the First Citizens Cup, which is the league cup competition for Trinidad and Tobago teams competing in the TT Pro League. Continuing from previous seasons, the slogan for the year's league cup was No Room for Losers and was sponsored by First Citizens Bank for the eleventh consecutive year. To keep with the tag-line, the year's edition only rewarded prizes to the cup winners and runner-up. Joe Public, as the defending cup holders, did not enter the competition after the club withdrew from the Pro League citing financial difficulties. The Eastern Lions defeated Defence Force in the 2010 final.

With both Defence Force's and Police's players summoned by Trinidad and Tobago Prime Minister Kamla Persad-Bissessar for service during a limited state of emergency, due to increased crime in portions of the country, only six Pro League clubs entered the competition.

== Qualification ==
With the number of participating clubs in the TT Pro League decreasing from ten to six over the 2010 edition of the First Citizens Cup, the format of the cup was changed from a knockout tournament to a competition with two phases. The quarterfinal round was converted into a single round-robin group phase with the top two teams in each three-team group advancing to the semifinals. The second phase, including the semifinals and final, of the league cup remained a single-elimination knockout tournament with each group winner facing the other group's runner-up. The draw for the group stage took place on 14 September 2011 at the First Citizens corporate box in Queen's Park Oval.

Following the random drawing for the group stage, San Juan Jabloteh, St. Ann's Rangers, and T&TEC were placed into Group A. Whereas, W Connection, Caledonia AIA, and North East Stars were drawn into Group B. All matches in the competition were staged in the Hasely Crawford Stadium in Mucurapo.

== Schedule ==
The schedule for the 2011 First Citizens Cup, as announced by the TT Pro League:

Phase	Round	Date	Matches	Clubs	New entries this round
Group stage	Quarterfinal Day 1	16 September 2011	2	6 → 4	6: 1st–6th
Group stage	Quarterfinal Day 2	20 September 2011	2	6 → 4	6: 1st–6th
Group stage	Quarterfinal Day 3	23 September 2011	2	6 → 4	6: 1st–6th
Knockout phase	Semifinals	30 September 2011	2	4 → 2	
Knockout phase	Final	14 October 2011	1	2 → 1	

== Group stage ==
The group stage featured the 6 teams from the TT Pro League competing the year's edition of the First Citizens Cup. In each group, teams played against each other once in a single round-robin format. The quarterfinal matchdays were on 16 September, 20 September, and 23 September 2011. The group winners and runners-up advanced to the semifinals, while the third-placed teams were eliminated from the competition.

If two or more teams are equal on points on completion of the group matches, the following criteria are applied to determine the rankings (in descending order):

1. Higher number of points obtained in the group matches played among the teams in question;
2. Superior goal difference from the group matches played among the teams in question;
3. Higher number of goals scored in the group matches played among the teams in question;

Key to colours in group tables
Group winners and runners-up advance to the semifinals

=== Group A ===
The new format of the First Citizens Cup began with a group stage on 16 September 2011. In a match at the Hasely Crawford Stadium, St. Ann's Rangers and Pro League newcomer T&TEC settled for a goalless draw. On the second matchday on 20 September, San Juan Jabloteh needed second-half goals from Willis Plaza, Hector Sam, and Luke Gullick to rally from a 4–1 deficit to settle for a 4–4 draw with T&TEC. With the winner of San Juan Jabloteh and St. Ann's Rangers match advancing to the semifinals, Jason Marcano registered a goal in the 61st minute to propel the San Juan Kings to top Group A on four points. T&TEC advanced as Group A runners-up with draws in each of their two matches.

Team	Pld	W	D	L	GF	GA	GD	Pts
San Juan Jabloteh	2	1	1	0	6	5	+1	4
T&TEC	2	0	2	0	4	4	0	2
St. Ann's Rangers	2	0	1	1	1	2	−1	1

16 September 2011	T&TEC	0–0	St. Ann's Rangers	Mucurapo, Trinidad
17:00 (UTC-4)		Report		Stadium: Hasely Crawford Stadium

20 September 2011	San Juan Jabloteh	4–4	T&TEC	Mucurapo, Trinidad
17:00 (UTC-4)	Plaza 30', 79'; Sam 71'; Gullick 89'	Report	Ferguson 12', 40'; Pacheco 55'; Modeste 59'	Stadium: Hasely Crawford Stadium

23 September 2011	St. Ann's Rangers	1–2	San Juan Jabloteh	Mucurapo, Trinidad
17:00 (UTC-4)	Nesbitt 42'	Report	Plaza 24'; Marcano 61'	Stadium: Hasely Crawford Stadium

=== Group B ===
On 16 September 2011, W Connection grabbed a 4–2 win over Caledonia AIA to top the Group of Death after the first matchday. On 20 September, W Connection defeated North East Stars 4–1 to win Group B and advance to the semifinals with a perfect six points from their two matches. Caledonia AIA used an Akim Armstrong brace to defeat North East Stars 2–0 and advance to the semifinals as runners-up in Group B.

Team	Pld	W	D	L	GF	GA	GD	Pts
W Connection	2	2	0	0	8	3	+5	6
Caledonia AIA	2	1	0	1	4	4	0	3
North East Stars	2	0	0	2	1	6	−5	0

16 September 2011	W Connection	4–2	Caledonia AIA	Mucurapo, Trinidad
19:00 (UTC-4)	Winchester 27'; Hector 30', 78'; J. Britto 33'	Report	Gay 25'; Caesar 90'	Stadium: Hasely Crawford Stadium

20 September 2011	North East Stars	1–4	W Connection	Mucurapo, Trinidad
19:00 (UTC-4)	John 81'	Report	Winchester 34'; Williams 37'; Hector 53'; J. Britto 75'	Stadium: Hasely Crawford Stadium

23 September 2011	Caledonia AIA	2–0	North East Stars	Mucurapo, Trinidad
19:00 (UTC-4)	Armstrong 37', 49'	Report		Stadium: Hasely Crawford Stadium

== Knockout phase ==
In the knockout phase, teams played against each other in a single-elimination tournament in the semifinals and final. San Juan Jabloteh finished as Group A winners and faced the runners-up from Group B, the Morvant/Laventille Stallions of Caledonia AIA. Moreover, the second semifinal match featured two undefeated teams with W Connection entering as winners of Group B and T&TEC, with two draws from two matches, as the Group A runners-up.

All matches were played for 90 minutes duration, at the end of which if the match was still tied, penalty-kicks were used to determine the match winner.

=== Bracket ===
Semifinals; 30 September 2011
A1	San Juan Jabloteh	1
B2	Caledonia AIA	2
B1	W Connection	1 (3)
A2	T&TEC	1 (4)

Final; 14 October 2011
B2	Caledonia AIA	2
A2	T&TEC	1

=== Semifinals ===
In the surprise of the tournament, the Electricity Boys of T&TEC defeated W Connection 4–3 after a penalty shootout at the end of a 1–1 semifinal draw on 30 September 2011. Romauld Aguillera scored in the 21st minute to give T&TEC a 1–0 lead at the break. However, Jerrel Britto scored his third goal of the tournament to level the scoreline at 1–1 after regulation. In the penalty shootout, Akini Adams saved two penalties from Joevin Jones and Jerrel Britto to send T&TEC into the final. In the other semifinal, Jamal Gay scored two second-half goals to cancel out a first-half penalty kick from San Juan Jabloteh's Marvin Oliver and give Caledonia AIA a 2–1 win.

30 September 2011	W Connection	1–1 (3–4 p)	T&TEC	Mucurapo, Trinidad
17:00 (UTC-4)	J. Britto 70'	Report	Aguillera 21'	Stadium: Hasely Crawford Stadium
	Penalties
	Hector (penalty scored); Williams (penalty scored); Jones (penalty missed); R. Britto (penalty scored); J. Britto (penalty missed)		Aguillera (penalty scored); Thomas (penalty missed); Noriega (penalty scored); Teesdale (penalty scored); Modeste (penalty scored)

30 September 2011	San Juan Jabloteh	1–2	Caledonia AIA	Mucurapo, Trinidad
19:00 (UTC-4)	Oliver 34' (pen.)	Report	Gay 47', 66'	Stadium: Hasely Crawford Stadium

=== Final ===
In the final on 14 October 2011 at Hasely Crawford Stadium in Mucurapo, Sylvester Teesdale scored a goal in the 15th minute to give T&TEC an early 1–0 lead. However, Kareem Joseph equalized for Caledonia AIA nine minutes later to send the match into half-time at 1–1. In the second half, Joseph scored the eventual match winning goal from the penalty spot to give the Morvant/Laventille Stallions their first First Citizens Cup title.

14 October 2011	Caledonia AIA	2–1	T&TEC	Mucurapo, Trinidad
19:00 (UTC-4)	Joseph 26', 65' (pen.)	Report	Teesdale 15'	Stadium: Hasely Crawford Stadium
