= 2011–12 TT Pro League =

TT Pro League
- Season: 2011–12
- Champions: W Connection; 4th Pro League title 4th T&T title
- 2012 CFU Club Championship: W Connection; Caledonia AIA
- 2013 CFU Club Championship: W Connection; Caledonia AIA
- Matches: 84
- Goals: 238 (2.83 per match)
- Top goalscorer: Richard Roy (15 goals)
- Biggest home win: W Connection 8–1 Police (29 March 2012)
- Biggest away win: Police 1–6 T&TEC (27 March 2012)
- Highest scoring: W Connection 8–1 Police (29 March 2012)

The 2011–12 TT Pro League season (known as the Digicel Pro League for sponsorship reasons) was the thirteenth season of the TT Pro League, the Trinidad and Tobago professional league for association football clubs, since its establishment in 1999. A total of eight teams contested the league, with Defence Force as the defending champions. The season began on 9 September 2011 and ended on 29 March 2012 with the crowning of W Connection as the league champion. Dexter Skeene, Pro League CEO, announced on 11 February 2011 that by aligning its seasons with those of the major leagues in Europe, the Pro League will afford the opportunity to further link culture with sport to harness and develop the talent of people in Trinidad and Tobago.

Following a runners-up finish in 2009 and being crowned champions in 2010, T&TEC were promoted from the National Super League to the Pro League on 1 March 2011. However, on 15 July 2011, Skeene announced that Ma Pau would not be part of the upcoming season. On 10 August 2011, Skeene further announced that both Joe Public and FC South End would not be participating in the 2011–12 season.

The start of the season was delayed for both Defence Force and Police by three months as Trinidad and Tobago Prime Minister Kamla Persad-Bissessar announced a limited state of emergency due to the increased crime in portions of the country. As a result, the Ministry of National Security services were implemented into full-fledged duties. The two teams returned to competition after curfew was lifted throughout Trinidad on 12 December 2011.

The first goal of the season was scored by North East Stars' Seon Power against Pro League newcomer, T&TEC, in the eighth minute of the first game on 9 September 2011. Richard Roy of Defence Force scored the first hat-trick of the season against St. Ann's Rangers on 31 January 2012. Roy went on to claim his first Golden Boot award having scored 15 goals to lead the league for Defence Force.

With a crushing 8–1 win over Police on the final match day of the season, W Connection claimed their fourth Pro League title. The winning match was the highest scoring of the season and featured two braces from Jerrel Britto and Andre Quashie. On 30 June 2012, it was announced that due to financial constraints San Juan Jabloteh suspended their football club operations and would not participate in the 2012–13 season.

By finishing as the league leader following the conclusion of the second round, W Connection qualified for the 2012 CFU Club Championship. In addition, by finishing second in the table, Caledonia AIA also qualified for the competition. Due to the change in the season calendar and the start of the CFU Club Championship in March of each year, the Caribbean Football Union and the Pro League agreed to award the league champion and runners-up (W Connection and T&TEC) qualification into the 2013 CFU Club Championship. However, on 5 March 2013, T&TEC withdrew from the 2013 CFU Club Championship citing the club's financial situation as reason to not participate in the competition. As a result, Caledonia AIA entered the competition after finishing third at the conclusion of the league season.

== Changes from the 2010–11 season ==
The following changes were made since the 2010–11 season:

- Dexter Skeene, Pro League CEO, announced that the league season would run from 9 September 2011 until 29 March 2012 to align itself with the major leagues in Europe.
  - The start of the league season was postponed from 19 August 2011 to 9 September 2011 due to a state of emergency implemented by the Government of Trinidad and Tobago in response to growing crime in areas of the country.
- There were a number of changes to the clubs competing in the 2011–12 season.
  - T&TEC were promoted from the National Super League as runners-up in 2009 and as champions in 2010.
  - Joe Public withdrew from the league; reasons for the withdrawal were not disclosed.
  - Ma Pau and FC South End withdrew from the league due to financial difficulties.
  - A three-year title sponsorship was agreed upon by Adam's Construction and San Juan Jabloteh.
- The following changes in qualification for the CFU Club Championship were made:
  - The top two teams with the most points in the qualifying table following the conclusion of Round Two qualified for the 2012 CFU Club Championship.
  - The top two teams with the most league points qualified for the 2013 CFU Club Championship.

== Teams ==
=== Team summaries ===
Location of the 2011–12 TT Pro League teams

Note: Flags indicate national team as has been defined under FIFA eligibility rules. Players may hold more than one non-FIFA nationality.

Team	Location	Stadium	Capacity	Manager	Captain
Caledonia AIA	Morvant/Laventille	Larry Gomes Stadium	10,000	(Trinidad and Tobago) Jamaal Shabazz	(Trinidad and Tobago) Stephan David
Defence Force	Chaguaramas	Hasely Crawford Stadium	27,000	(Trinidad and Tobago) Ross Russell	(Trinidad and Tobago) Corey Rivers
North East Stars	Sangre Grande	Sangre Grande Ground	7,000	(Brazil) Emerson Alcântara	(Guyana) Charles Pollard
Police	Saint James	Hasely Crawford Stadium	27,000	(Trinidad and Tobago) Kelvin Jones	(Trinidad and Tobago) Todd Ryan
San Juan Jabloteh	San Juan	Hasely Crawford Stadium	27,000	(Trinidad and Tobago) Earl Carter	(Trinidad and Tobago) Cleon John
St. Ann's Rangers	San Juan	Hasely Crawford Stadium	27,000	(Trinidad and Tobago) Dean Pacheco	(Trinidad and Tobago) Akil Clarke
T&TEC	San Fernando	Manny Ramjohn Stadium	10,000	(Trinidad and Tobago) Dexter Cyrus	(Trinidad and Tobago) Clayton Ince
W Connection	Point Lisas	Manny Ramjohn Stadium	10,000	(Saint Lucia) Stuart Charles-Fevrier	(Saint Lucia) Elijah Joseph

=== Managerial changes ===
Team	Outgoing manager	Manner of departure	Date of vacancy	Table	Incoming manager	Date of appointment	Table
T&TEC	Promoted team				(Trinidad and Tobago) Dexter Cyrus	9 September 2011	Pre-season
North East Stars	(Trinidad and Tobago) Shurland David	Sacked	26 September 2011	7th	(Brazil) Emerson Alcântara	25 October 2011	3rd
St. Ann's Rangers	(Trinidad and Tobago) Anthony Streete	Sacked	29 February 2012	7th	(Trinidad and Tobago) Dean Pacheco	2 March 2012	7th
North East Stars	(Brazil) Emerson Alcântara	Sacked	13 June 2012	7th	(Trinidad and Tobago) Angus Eve	13 June 2012	Postseason

== League table ==
Pos	Team	Pld	W	D	L	GF	GA	GD	Pts	Qualification
1	W Connection (C)	21	13	1	7	32	20	+12	40	2012 CFU Club Championship Second round (Note: W Connection and Caledonia AIA finished in the top two positions in the table following Round Two of competition and qualified for the 2012 CFU Club Championship.) 2013 CFU Club Championship First round (Note: W Connection and Caledonia AIA further qualified for the 2013 CFU Club Championship due to the change to a September/April season calendar and the withdraw of T&TEC from the CFU Club Championship.)
2	T&TEC	21	11	6	4	36	19	+17	39	
3	Caledonia AIA	21	12	2	7	34	28	+6	38	2012 CFU Club Championship Second round (Note: W Connection and Caledonia AIA finished in the top two positions in the table following Round Two of competition and qualified for the 2012 CFU Club Championship.) 2013 CFU Club Championship First round (Note: W Connection and Caledonia AIA further qualified for the 2013 CFU Club Championship due to the change to a September/April season calendar and the withdraw of T&TEC from the CFU Club Championship.)
4	Defence Force	21	9	5	7	32	28	+4	32	
5	San Juan Jabloteh	21	7	6	8	29	30	−1	27	Team disbanded after season (Note: San Juan Jabloteh suspended its football club operations and withdrew from the Pro League for the 2012–13 season.)
6	Police	21	5	6	10	30	47	−17	21	
7	North East Stars	21	5	5	11	21	27	−6	20	
8	St. Ann's Rangers	21	4	5	12	24	39	−15	17	

Updated to match(es) played on 29 March 2012. Source: TT Pro League
Rules for classification: 1) points; 2) goal difference; 3) number of goals scored.
(C) Champions

=== Positions by round ===
Leader
2012 CFU Club Championship Second round 2013 CFU Club Championship First round
Team disbanded after season

The table lists the positions of teams after each week of matches. In order to preserve chronological evolvements, any postponed matches are not included to the round at which they were originally scheduled, but added to the full round they were played immediately afterwards. For example, if a match is scheduled for the tenth round of matches, but then postponed and played between rounds 16 and 17, it will be added to the standings for round 16.

Team ╲ Round	1	2	3	4	5	6	7	8	9	10	11	12	13	14	15	16	17	18	19	20	21
W Connection	4	5	5	4	3	4	3	3	3	3	3	3	2	2	2	1	2	2	2	2	1
T&TEC	3	1	1	1	1	1	1	1	1	1	1	1	1	1	1	2	1	1	1	1	2
Caledonia AIA	5	7	6	8	8	8	8	6	6	4	4	4	4	4	4	4	3	3	3	3	3
Defence Force	2	2	3	3	4	2	4	4	4	5	5	5	5	5	5	5	5	5	5	4	4
San Juan Jabloteh	1	3	2	2	2	3	2	2	2	2	2	2	3	3	3	3	4	4	4	5	5
Police	8	8	8	7	7	6	6	7	7	7	7	6	7	6	8	8	8	8	6	6	6
North East Stars	6	4	4	5	5	5	5	5	5	6	6	7	6	7	6	6	6	6	7	7	7
St. Ann's Rangers	7	6	7	6	6	7	7	8	8	8	8	8	8	8	7	7	7	7	8	8	8

Updated to match(es) played on 29 March 2012. Source: TT Pro League

== Results ==
=== Matches 1–14 ===
Home \ Away	CAL	DEF	NES	POL	SJJ	RAN	TEC	WCO
Caledonia AIA		1–2	0–1	1–1	3–1	1–0	1–0	0–2
Defence Force	2–3		1–1	1–1	1–1	4–1	1–1	0–1
North East Stars	0–1	0–1		0–0	1–2	1–2	1–2	0–1
Police	1–3	4–2	2–3		1–3	0–0	1–6	0–1
San Juan Jabloteh	1–1	2–1	1–1	1–0		3–3	1–1	2–0
St. Ann's Rangers	2–1	1–3	0–1	2–2	2–1		1–1	0–1
T&TEC	2–0	3–1	0–0	1–4	1–0	3–0		2–0
W Connection	1–2	0–1	2–1	1–2	0–2	2–1	1–0	

Updated to match(es) played on 29 March 2012. Source: TT Pro League
Legend: Blue = home team win; Yellow = draw; Red = away team win.

=== Matches 15–21 ===
Home \ Away	CAL	DEF	NES	POL	SJJ	RAN	TEC	WCO
Caledonia AIA			3–2			2–0	3–2	
Defence Force	2–3			0–0	3–0			2–0
North East Stars		1–2				2–0	1–1	1–4
Police	3–2		2–1		2–4		1–2	
San Juan Jabloteh	1–2		0–2			2–2		0–1
St. Ann's Rangers		1–2		5–2			0–2	
T&TEC		3–0			2–1			1–1
W Connection	2–1			8–1		3–1		

Updated to match(es) played on 29 March 2012. Source: TT Pro League
Legend: Blue = home team win; Yellow = draw; Red = away team win.

== Season statistics ==
=== Scoring ===
- First goal of the season: Seon Power for North East Stars against T&TEC, (9 September 2011).
- Last goal of the season: Makesi Lewis for Caledonia AIA against T&TEC, (29 March 2012).
- First own goal of the season: Devon Modeste (St. Ann's Rangers) for W Connection. (16 December 2011).
- First penalty kick of the season: Stern John (scored) for North East Stars against San Juan Jabloteh (25 October 2011).
- First hat-trick of the season: Richard Roy (Defence Force) against St. Ann's Rangers, 25', 44', 73' (31 January 2012)
- Most goals scored by one player in a match: 3 goals
  - Richard Roy (Defence Force) against St. Ann's Rangers, 25', 44', 73' (31 January 2012).
  - Vurlon Mills (T&TEC) against Police, 13', 62', 90' (27 March 2012).
- Widest winning margin: 7 goals
  - W Connection 8–1 Police (29 March 2012)
- Most goals in a match: 9 goals
  - W Connection 8–1 Police (29 March 2012)
- Most goals in one half: 6 goals
  - W Connection v Police (29 March 2012) 3–0 at half-time, 8–1 final.
- Most goals in one half by a single team: 5 goals
  - W Connection v Police (29 March 2012) 3–0 at half-time, 8–1 final.

==== Top scorers ====
Rank	Player	Club	Goals
1	(Trinidad and Tobago) Richard Roy	Defence Force	15
2	(Trinidad and Tobago) Willis Plaza	San Juan Jabloteh	11
3	(Trinidad and Tobago) Sylvester Teesdale	T&TEC	10
4	(Trinidad and Tobago) Devon Modeste	St. Ann's Rangers	9
5	(Trinidad and Tobago) Devorn Jorsling	Caledonia AIA	8
6	(Trinidad and Tobago) Jerrel Britto	W Connection	7
6	(Trinidad and Tobago) Jamal Gay	Caledonia AIA	7
6	(Trinidad and Tobago) Ataullah Guerra	Caledonia AIA	7
9	(Trinidad and Tobago) Jason Marcano	San Juan Jabloteh	5
9	(Trinidad and Tobago) Cameron Roget	St. Ann's Rangers	5
9	(Trinidad and Tobago) Hector Sam	San Juan Jabloteh / St. Ann's Rangers	5
9	(Trinidad and Tobago) Ryan Stewart	Caledonia AIA / North East Stars	5

==== Hat-tricks ====
Player	For	Against	Result	Date	Ref(s)
(Trinidad and Tobago) Richard Roy	Defence Force	St. Ann's Rangers*	1–3	31 January 2012	
(Guyana) Vurlon Mills	T&TEC	Police*	1–6	27 March 2012	

- * Home team score first in result

=== Discipline ===
- First yellow card of the season: Charles Pollard for North East Stars against T&TEC, 9 September 2011
- First red card of the season: Nicholas Valentine for St. Ann's Rangers against T&TEC, 21 October 2011
- Most yellow cards in a single match: 7
  - Caledonia AIA 3–2 T&TEC – 4 for Caledonia AIA (Nuru Abdallah Muhammad, Walter Moore, Ataullah Guerra & Devorn Jorsling) and 3 for T&TEC (Bevon Bass, Kern Peters & Sylvester Teesdale) (29 March 2012)
- Most red cards in a single match: 2
  - St. Ann's Rangers 1–1 T&TEC – 0 for St. Ann's Rangers and 2 for T&TEC (Sylvester Teesdale & Kevon Neaves) (6 January 2012)

== Awards ==
=== Annual awards ===
The 2011–12 TT Pro League awards distribution took place on 8 April 2013, over a year after the conclusion of the league season, at Capital Plaza in Port of Spain, Trinidad.

Although W Connection claimed its fourth Pro League championship, Caledonia AIA was named the Team of the Year after the Stallions of Morvant/Laventille claimed the FA Trophy, First Citizens Cup, Lucozade Sport Goal Shield, and CFU Club Championship titles. Jamaal Shabazz was named the Manager of the Year after leading Caledonia AIA to its most successful season in club history. Richard Roy of Defence Force secured his first Player of the Year honour after the Trinidad and Tobago international had a break-out season scoring 15 goals to claim the Golden Boot and Best Forward awards. Jan-Michael Williams, Nuru Abdullah Muhammad, and Ataullah Guerra were respectively named the Best Goalkeeper, Best Defender, and Best Midfielder. The remaining team award was won by W Connection for the Most Disciplined Team of the Year. FIFA international referee, Neal Brizan, won the Referee of the Year for the fifth consecutive year, whereas Boris Punch won the Match Commissioner of the Year.

Award	Winner
Player of the Year	(Trinidad and Tobago) Richard Roy (Defence Force)
Manager of the Year	(Trinidad and Tobago) Jamaal Shabazz (Caledonia AIA)
Best Goalkeeper	(Trinidad and Tobago) Jan-Michael Williams (W Connection)
Best Defender	(Trinidad and Tobago) Nuru Abdullah Muhammad (Caledonia AIA)
Best Midfielder	(Trinidad and Tobago) Ataullah Guerra (Caledonia AIA)
Best Forward	(Trinidad and Tobago) Richard Roy (Defence Force)
Golden Boot	(Trinidad and Tobago) Richard Roy (Defence Force)
Team of the Year	Caledonia AIA
Most Disciplined Team of the Year	W Connection
Referee of the Year	Neal Brizan
Assistant Referee of the Year	Cindy Mohammed
Match Commissioner of the Year	Boris Punch
