= 2018 Trinidad and Tobago League Cup =

2018 First Citizens Cup
Trinidad and Tobago League Cup

Tournament details
- Country: Trinidad and Tobago
- Teams: 10

Final positions
- Champions: Central; 3rd title
- Runners-up: Defence Force

Tournament statistics
- Matches played: 23
- Goals scored: 74 (3.22 per match)
- Top goal scorer(s): Kareem Freitas; Dylon King; Brent Sam

The 2018 Trinidad and Tobago League Cup (known for sponsorship reasons as the 2018 First Citizens Cup) was the nineteenth season of the First Citizens Cup, which is the league cup competition for Trinidad and Tobago teams competing in the TT Pro League and will run from the 8 June to 20 July. W Connection entered as the cup holders having defeated Defence Force by a score of 3–1 in the 2017 final. The cup underwent a format change where the clubs were divided into 2 groups of 5 teams. The teams would play each other once on a round-robin basis and the top 2 teams from each group would advance to the semifinals.

== Group stage ==
In the group stage, each teams played each other twice round-robin basis. The top 2 teams from each group advanced to the semifinals.

=== Group Immortelle ===
Pos	Team	Pld	W	D	L	GF	GA	GD	Pts	Qualification
1	Defence Force (Q)	4	3	0	1	15	4	+11	9	Semifinals
2	Central (Q)	4	3	0	1	7	4	+3	9	Semifinals
3	Club Sando	4	2	1	1	4	4	0	7	
4	St. Ann's Rangers	4	1	0	3	4	12	−8	3	
5	San Juan Jabloteh	4	0	1	3	2	8	−6	1	

Updated to match(es) played on 11 July 2018. Source: TT Pro League
Rules for classification: 1) points; 2) goal difference; 3) number of goals scored.
(Q) Qualified for the phase indicated

=== Group Abercrombie ===
Pos	Team	Pld	W	D	L	GF	GA	GD	Pts	Qualification
1	Police (Q)	4	3	0	1	9	3	+6	9	Semifinals
2	Morvant Caledonia United (Q)	4	3	0	1	7	3	+4	9	Semifinals
3	W Connection	4	2	0	2	6	5	+1	6	
4	Point Fortin Civic	4	2	0	2	8	8	0	6	
5	North East Stars	4	0	0	4	2	13	−11	0	

Updated to match(es) played on 11 July 2018. Source: TT Pro League
Rules for classification: 1) points; 2) goal difference; 3) number of goals scored.
(Q) Qualified for the phase indicated

== Semifinals ==
13 July 2018	Police	1–1 (6–7 p)	Central	Hasely Crawford Stadium
20:00	Freitas 12'	Report	Muckette 70'
	Penalties
	Ryan (penalty scored); Brathwaite (penalty scored); O’Neil (penalty scored); Mc Fee (penalty missed); Freitas (penalty scored); Alleyne (penalty scored); Wilson (penalty scored); Perry (penalty missed)		Baptiste (penalty scored); Wolfe (penalty scored); Cummings (penalty scored); Armstrong (penalty scored); Muckette (penalty missed); Sampson (penalty scored); Pope (penalty scored); London (penalty scored)

13 July 2018	Defence Force	4–0	Morvant Caledonia United	Hasely Crawford Stadium
18:00	Arcia 29'; Sam 42', 83'; Balthazar 80'	Report

== Final ==
20 July 2018	Defence Force	2–2 (2–4 p)	Central	Port of Spain
19:00	King 64'; Jorsling 66'	Report	Cummings 42', 84'	Stadium: Hasely Crawford Stadium; Referee: Cecile Hinds
	Penalties
	Arcia (penalty scored); King (penalty missed); Moore (penalty missed); Sam (penalty scored)		Baptiste (penalty scored); Armstrong (penalty scored); Cummings (penalty scored); Sampson (penalty missed); Muckette (penalty scored)

== Season statistics ==
=== Top scorers ===
Rank	Player	Club	Goals
1	(Trinidad and Tobago) Kareem Freitas	Police	5
1	(Trinidad and Tobago) Dylon King	Defence Force	5
1	(Trinidad and Tobago) Brent Sam	Defence Force	5
4	(Trinidad and Tobago) Marcus Joseph	W Connection	4
5	(Trinidad and Tobago) Reon Moore	Defence Force	3
5	(Trinidad and Tobago) Keron Cummings	Central	3
7	(Trinidad and Tobago) Kevon Piper	Club Sando	2
7	(Trinidad and Tobago) Tyrone Charles	Central	2
7	(Trinidad and Tobago) Saleem Henry	St. Ann's Rangers	2
7	(Trinidad and Tobago) Dwight Quintero	Defence Force	2
