= Yu Hoshide =

Japanese association football manager and former player

Yu Hoshide 星出 悠
Personal information
- Full name: Yu Hoshide
- Date of birth: August 16, 1977 (age 49)
- Place of birth: Tokyo, Japan
- Height: 5 ft 9 in (1.75 m)
- Position: Midfielder

Youth career
- Takashimadaira S.C.
- Mitsubishi Yowa

College career
Years	Team	Apps	(Gls)
- Meiji University

Senior career*
Years	Team	Apps	(Gls)
2000–2007	YKK AP	202	(41)
2008	Harrisburg City Islanders	12	(2)
2009	Northern Virginia Royals	12	(1)
2009–2010	Joe Public	48	(5)
2011	Global		
2016	JP Voltes		
2017	Global Cebu		

Managerial career
- 2016: JP Voltes (player-coach)
- 2019–2020: Kaya–Iloilo (assistant)
- 2020–2026: Kaya–Iloilo
- * Club domestic league appearances and goals as of 23:00, 20 June 2013 (UTC)

Yu Hoshide (星出 悠, Hoshide Yū; born August 16, 1977) is a Japanese football manager and former player. He played as a midfielder and spent his career in Japan, the United States, Trinidad and Tobago, and the Philippines. He was the player-coach of JP Voltes during the 2016 season of the United Football League.

== Career ==
=== Youth and college ===
Hoshide was born in Tokyo, Japan. At age five, he joined the local Takashimadaira Soccer Club. When he was in high school, he moved to Mitsubishi Yowa S.C. He then became an athletic scholar for Meiji University, where he studied political science.

=== YKK ===
Hoshide spent eight years with YKK AP (currently known as Kataller Toyama of the J.League) in the third division Japan Football League before coming to the United States in 2008.

=== Harrisburg City Islanders ===
Hoshide signed for Harrisburg City Islanders in the USL Second Division. Hoshide played 13 games and scored 1 goal during his year with Harrisburg, before being released at the end of the year.

=== Northern Virginia Royals ===
He subsequently signed for Northern Virginia Royals in 2009.

=== Joe Public ===
In July 2009, Hoshide joined Joe Public of Trinidad and Tobago's TT Pro League, becoming the first Asian player in the league. While Hoshide became close friends with Fabien Lewis (The former Naparima College defender) who now plies his trade with Real Maryland Monarchs was the one who introduced Hoshide to Inshan Flex Mohammed of the Soca Warriors Online, who in turn assisted him in obtaining a trial with the Eastern Lions. Hoshide was quite impressive on his first trial with the Pro League title chasers and as a result was offered a short-term contract.

His quick thinking and technical ability in midfield proved vital in helping Joe Public capture five titles that included the Big Six, Toyota Classic, Digicel Pro Bowl and the T&T Football Federation FA Trophy last season.

Hoshide also became the first Japanese to take part and score in the CONCACAF Champions League with number 10 on his back.

=== Global FC ===
In August 2011, he signed for Filipino side Global F.C., and was immediately assigned as team captain. He made his debut in the 3–2 loss against Stallions in the opening match of the 2011–12 United Football Cup. He captained the Global FC in their 1st UFL Championship since the UFL became a semi-pro league. He won the Agility Award in the awarding ceremony.

=== JP Voltes ===
In January 2016, he signed for JP Voltes, a newly promoted team from UFL Division 2 together with his team mates from Global, Masaki Yanagawa and Satoshi Ōtomo.

== Career statistics ==
=== Club ===
As of 20 June 2013

Club	Season	League			Cup (Note: Includes Lamar Hunt US Open Cup, UFL Cup, PFF National Men's Club Championship and Singapore Cup.)			Total		
Club	Season	Apps	Goals	Assists	Apps	Goals	Assists	Apps	Goals	Assists
YKK (Note: Known since 2007 as Kataller Toyama in the J.League)	2000–2007	197	40	?	5	1	1	202	41	?
Harrisburg City Islanders	2008	13	1	?	1	1	0	14	2	?
Northern Virginia Royals	2009	12	1	3	?	?	?	12	1	3
Joe Public	2009	10	0	2	18	2	4	28	2	6
Joe Public	2010	11	1	4	10	2	2	21	3	6
Global	2011–2012	18	0	0	4	1	0	22	1	0
Global	2012–2013	17	0	0	2	0	0	19	0	0
Career Total	2000–present	278	43	9	40	7	7	318	50	15

=== Continental ===
Season	Team	Competition	Apps	Goals	Assists
2010–11	Joe Public	CONCACAF Champions League	8	1	2
2010	Joe Public	CFU Club Championship	5	1	0

== Managerial career ==
While Hoshide was still playing with the JP Voltes of UFL Division 2, he also serves as head coach of the club. In 2019, Hoshide was appointed as one of the assistant coaches to Noel Marcaida at Kaya F.C.–Iloilo.

== Managerial statistics ==
As of match played 11 December 2025

Managerial record by team and tenure
Team	Nat.	From	To	Record					Ref.
Team	Nat.	From	To	G	W	D	L	Win %	Ref.
JP Voltes	(Philippines)	1 January 2016	31 December 2016	16	11	2	3	68.75	
Kaya	(Philippines)	1 September 2020	8 June 2021	5	3	2	0	60.00	
Kaya	(Philippines)	1 August 2021	30 June 2023	37	28	2	7	75.68	
Kaya	(Philippines)	1 February 2024	Present	56	34	4	18	60.71	
Career Total				114	76	10	28	66.67	

== Honours ==
=== As player ===
Joe Public

- TT Pro League: 2009
- Trinidad and Tobago FA Trophy: 2009
- Trinidad and Tobago League Cup: 2010; runner-up 2009
- Trinidad and Tobago Classic: 2009
- TT Pro League Big Six: 2009
- Trinidad and Tobago Pro Bowl: 2009
- Caribbean Club Championship: runner-up 2010

Global

- United Football League: 2012, 2014, 2016
- PFF National Men's Club Championship: 2011; runner-up 2013–14, 2014–15
- United Football League Cup: 2016; runner-up 2012
- United Football League FA League Cup: runner-up 2014
- United Football League Football Alliance Cup: 2014

Individual

- State Select (Toyama) – All Japan Champion; League Assist King: 2000
- Japan Football League All Star – Myanmar/Indonesia Tour: 2003
- State Select (Toyama) – All Japan Runner Up: 2003
- United Football League Agility Award: 2012

=== As manager ===
Kaya–Iloilo

- Philippines Football League: 2022–23, 2024, 2024–25; runner-up 2020
