= Atlantic Bank =

Atlantic Bank may refer to:

- Atlantic Bank of New York
- Atlantic National Bank, Jacksonville, Florida
- Atlantic National Bank (New York City)
- Atlantic Bank & Trust, Charleston-based bank failed in 2011
- Atlantic Bank Group constituent banks in West Africa
