= 2010 Trinidad and Tobago League Cup =

2010 First Citizens Cup
Trinidad and Tobago League Cup

Tournament details
- Country: Trinidad and Tobago
- Teams: 10

Final positions
- Champions: Joe Public
- Runners-up: Defence Force

Tournament statistics
- Matches played: 9
- Goals scored: 17 (1.89 per match)
- Top goal scorer: Kerry Baptiste (2 goals)

== Schedule ==
The schedule for the 2010 First Citizens Cup, as announced by the TT Pro League:

Round	Date	Matches	Clubs	New entries this round
9th place playoff	3 September 2010	1	10 → 9	2: 9th–10th
Qualifying round	18 September 2010	1	9 → 8	1: 8th
Quarterfinals	1 October 2010	4	8 → 4	7: 1st–7th
Semifinals	15 October 2010	2	4 → 2	
Final	23 October 2010	1	2 → 1	

== Bracket ==
9th place playoff 3 September 2010
9	FC South End	2
10	Police	1

Qualifying round 18 September 2010
7	North East Stars	2
9	FC South End	1

Quarterfinals; 1 October 2010
1	Defence Force	0 (2)
8	St. Ann's Rangers	0 (1)
4	Ma Pau
5	San Juan Jabloteh
3	W Connection	2
6	Caledonia AIA	0
2	Joe Public	2
7	North East Stars	0

Semifinals; 15 October 2010
1	Defence Force	1
4	Ma Pau	0
3	W Connection	1
2	Joe Public	3

Final; 23 October 2010
1	Defence Force	1 (0)
2	Joe Public	1 (3)

== Results ==
All matches were played for 90 minutes duration, at the end of which if the match was still tied, penalty-kicks were used to determine the match winner.

=== 9th place playoff ===
3 September 2010	FC South End	2–1	Police	Macoya, Trinidad
19:00 (UTC-4)	Etienne 17'; Modeste 80'	Report	Williams 22'	Stadium: Marvin Lee Stadium

=== Qualifying round ===
18 September 2010	North East Stars	2–1	FC South End	Macoya, Trinidad
19:00 (UTC-4)	Morrison 80' (o.g.); Fraser 90+3'	Report	Bacchus 48'	Stadium: Marvin Lee Stadium

=== Quarterfinals ===
1 October 2010	Defence Force	0–0 (2–1 p)	St. Ann's Rangers	Marabella, Trinidad
18:00 (UTC-4)		Report		Stadium: Manny Ramjohn Stadium; Referee: Neal Brizan
	Penalties
	Edwards (penalty scored); Thornhill (penalty scored)		Clarke (penalty scored)

1 October 2010	W Connection	2–0	Caledonia AIA	Marabella, Trinidad
20:00 (UTC-4)	Viveros 47'; Hector 85'	Report		Stadium: Manny Ramjohn Stadium; Referee: Neal Brizan

2 October 2010	Joe Public	2–0	North East Stars	Mucurapo, Trinidad
18:00 (UTC-4)	Gregory 36'; Baptiste 45' (pen.)	Report		Stadium: Hasley Crawford Stadium

2 October 2010	Ma Pau	w/o	San Juan Jabloteh	Mucurapo, Trinidad
20:00 (UTC-4)		Report		Stadium: Hasely Crawford Stadium; Referee: Gordon Maloney

=== Semifinals ===
15 October 2010	Defence Force	1–0	Ma Pau	Macoya, Trinidad
18:00 (UTC-4)	Edwards 34'	Report		Stadium: Marvin Lee Stadium

15 October 2010	Joe Public	3–1	W Connection	Macoya, Trinidad
20:00 (UTC-4)	Noel 30'; Hoshide 81'; Baptiste 90'	Report	Arias 15'	Stadium: Marvin Lee Stadium

=== Final ===
23 October 2010	Defence Force	1–1 (0–3 p)	Joe Public	Macoya, Trinidad
20:00 (UTC-4)	Jorsling 63'	Report	Mitchell 79'	Stadium: Marvin Lee Stadium; Referee: Lee Davis
	Penalties
	Jorsling (penalty missed); Elcock (penalty missed); Edwards (penalty missed)		Noel (penalty missed); Toussaint (penalty scored); Mitchell (penalty scored); Hoshide (penalty scored)
