= Hoshide =

Hoshide (written: 星出) is a Japanese surname. Notable people with the surname include:

- Akihiko Hoshide (星出 彰彦, born 1968), Japanese astronaut
- Yu Hoshide (星出 悠, born 1977), Japanese footballer

== See also ==
- 14926 Hoshide, a main-belt asteroid
