= Kareem Joseph =

Trinidad and Tobago footballer

Personal information
- Date of birth: 12 April 1983 (age 43)
- Place of birth: Morvant, Trinidad, Trinidad and Tobago
- Height: 1.79 m (5 ft 10 in)
- Positions: Right-back; midfielder; winger

Senior career*
Years	Team	Apps	(Gls)
2000–2018	Caledonia AIA		(48)
- * Club domestic league appearances and goals

Kareem Joseph (born 12 April 1983) is a Trinidadian former professional footballer who played as a right-back or midfielder for Caledonia AIA in the TT Pro League. He scored 48 league goals during his entire career, all with Caledonia AIA.

== Early life ==
Joseph was born in Morvant, Trinidad and Tobago and attended Malick Secondary School in Trinidad along with future Caledonia AIA team-mate Devorn Jorsling. Joseph featured predominantly as one of a handful of right-wingers that provided service to standout striker Jorsling. During his school days, Joseph was given the nickname Tiny due to his small physique.

== Career ==
=== Caledonia AIA ===
Joseph began his professional career with Caledonia AIA of the TT Pro League, having signed with his hometown club in 2000. During his early years, Joseph was crowded out upfront and did not particularly distinguish himself as a midfielder. After being reassigned to right-back, Joseph earned a reputation for his tactical awareness, composure, and fitness. Moreover, Joseph is also known for his service as a penalty taker and has regularly tallied goals from the penalty spot each season.

Joseph had a break-out year during the 2006 season as he became a regular starter and provided seven goals for Caledonia AIA. Joseph followed with an additional two league goals in 2007. He also featured in Caledonia AIA's cup successes in 2008 having scored eight goals in all competitions to lead his club to their first FA Trophy and Pro Bowl titles. He followed with eight additional goals throughout the 2009 TT Pro League competition calendar. Joseph scored a pair of goals in the 2011 First Citizens Cup final to give Caledonia AIA their first league cup in club history with a 2–1 victory over T&TEC. He first equalised the match in the first half with a rocket from outside right of the penalty area before scoring a penalty in the 65th minute.

In the 2012 CFU Club Championship, Joseph was a starter in the Caledonia AIA defence that recorded three clean sheets en route to winning the CFU Club Championship and securing the club's first qualification into the CONCACAF Champions League. During the 2012–13 Champions League, Joseph recorded the lone goal from a penalty kick for Caledonia AIA in a 3–1 defeat to Seattle Sounders FC in their first Group 4 match. On 30 August 2012, Joseph scored his second goal of the competition in the 66th minute against Seattle Sounders. The match ended again in a 3–1 loss to the Major League Soccer team in Ato Boldon Stadium in Couva. Joseph finished the competition with appearances in each of Caledonia AIA's four matches having scored two goals.

== Personal life ==
Joseph is married to women's national team footballer Tasha St. Louis and the pair have a seven-year-old daughter Kailah. He is also the older brother of Caledonia AIA teammate Sherron Joseph and cousin of Canadian soccer player Atiba Hutchinson.

== See also ==
- Association football in Trinidad and Tobago
- Caledonia AIA
