= Jared London =

Trinidad and Tobago footballer

Personal information
- Date of birth: 6 February 1995 (age 31)
- Position: Midfielder

Team information
- Current team: Club Sando

Senior career*
Years	Team	Apps	(Gls)
2015–	Club Sando		

International career^{‡}
2017–	Trinidad and Tobago	3	(0)
- * Club domestic league appearances and goals as of 14:36, 26 March 2018 (UTC) ‡ National team caps and goals as of 14:36, 26 March 2018 (UTC)

Jared London (born 6 February 1995) is a Trinidadian international footballer who plays for Club Sando, as a midfielder.

== Career ==
He has played club football for Club Sando.

He made his international debut for Trinidad and Tobago in 2017.
