= First Citizens Bank of South Carolina =

First Citizens Bank of South Carolina is a subsidiary of First Citizens BancShares, Inc., of Raleigh, North Carolina; it is the largest bank in the United States controlled by a single family. Prior to its acquisition by First Citizens BancShares Inc. of Raleigh, First Citizens Bancorporation, Inc. was a bank holding company based in Columbia, South Carolina with over $8 billion in assets. First Citizens Bank of South Carolina had branches in both South Carolina and Georgia. It was the second-largest commercial bank headquartered in South Carolina.

== History ==
In 1913, the Homestead Bank was founded in Columbia, South Carolina, and later became Commercial Bank and Trust Company of South Carolina. In 1964, the Holding brothers — Frank, Lewis and Robert, who were part owners of First Citizens Bank and Trust of North Carolina - acquired a controlling interest in Anderson Bank of Dillon, South Carolina, which had one location and sixteen employees. Over the years, Anderson Bank grew, changing its name to Citizens Bank of South Carolina in 1968. Commercial Bank and Trust merged with Citizens Bank, becoming First Citizens Bank and Trust Company of South Carolina, headquartered in Columbia.

In 1995, First Citizens acquired Summerville National Bank. In 2002, First Citizens entered Georgia by buying Citizens Bank, and added other Georgia operations with First Bank and Trust and The Bank of Toccoa in 2003. In 2005, First Citizens bought Greenville-based Summit Financial Corporation and People's Community Bank in Aiken.

On July 23, 2010, First Citizens took over the operations and five branches of Kingstree, South Carolina-based Williamsburg First National Bank from the Federal Deposit Insurance Corporation.

On June 3, 2011, Charleston, South Carolina-based Atlantic Bank & Trust became the first bank to fail in that area since 1992. The three offices reopened June 6 as First Citizens branches. Atlantic Bank had $208 million in assets, $191 million in retail deposits, and three locations—Charleston, Myrtle Beach, and Savannah, Georgia.

On July 22, 2011, branches of Exchange Bank of South Carolina, another subsidiary of First Citizens Bancorporation, began converting to First Citizens branches. The change involved four branches in Kingstree and Andrews.

On June 10, 2014, it was announced that First Citizens Bank and Trust of Columbia, South Carolina would be acquired by First Citizens Bank of Raleigh. Following shareholder and regulatory approvals, Frank B. Holding Jr., chairman and CEO of Raleigh-based First Citizens BancShares and First Citizens Bank, led the combined bank.

As of January 1, 2015, First Citizens Bancorporation, Inc. of Columbia, South Carolina merged with and became a wholly owned subsidiary of First Citizens BancShares, Inc. of Raleigh, North Carolina.
