= Romauld Aguillera =

Trinidad and Tobago footballer

Personal information
- Date of birth: 7 February 1979 (age 47)
- Place of birth: Palo Seco, Trinidad and Tobago
- Height: 1.76 m (5 ft 9 1/2 in)
- Position: Defensive midfielder

Senior career*
Years	Team	Apps	(Gls)
2002–2003	Arima Fire Malabar		
2005	W Connection		
2006–2008	United Petrotrin		
2009–2011	W Connection		
2011–2013	T&TEC Sports Club		
2013–2017	United Petrotrin		

International career^{‡}
2003–2007	Trinidad and Tobago	6	(0)
Medal record
W Connection
Winner	TT Pro League	2006
T&TEC Sports Club
Runner-up	TT Pro League	2011–12
- * Club domestic league appearances and goals as of 11:00, 18 July 2018 (UTC) ‡ National team caps and goals as of 11:00, 18 July 2018 (UTC)

Romauld Aguillera (born 2 February, 1979) is a retired Trinidadian football player.

== Career statistics ==
=== International ===
As of matches played 2008.

National team	Year	Apps	Goals
Trinidad and Tobago	2003	1	0
Trinidad and Tobago	2007	5	0
Total		6	0
