= Duane Muckette =

Trinidadian footballer

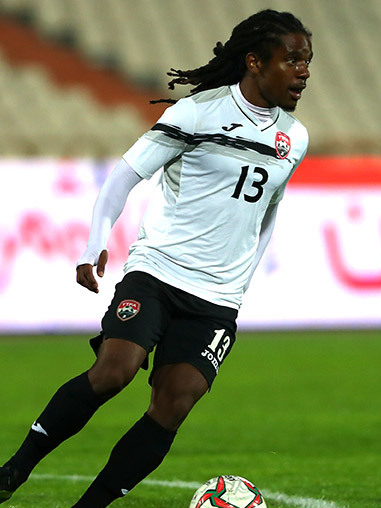
- Muckette with Trinidad & Tobago in 2018

Personal information
- Date of birth: July 1, 1995 (age 31)
- Place of birth: Port of Spain, Trinidad and Tobago
- Height: 1.77 m (5 ft 10 in)
- Position: Midfielder

Youth career
- 2010–2011: Morvant Caledonia United
- 2011–2013: FC Santa Rosa

College career
Years	Team	Apps	(Gls)
2013–2014	South Florida Bulls	35	(0)

Senior career*
Years	Team	Apps	(Gls)
2015–2016	North East Stars	4	(1)
2016–2017	Barreirense	17	(1)
2017	North East Stars	10	(1)
2018	Central	18	(7)
2019–2020	Memphis 901	35	(2)
2022-	AC Port of Spain	?	(?)

International career^{‡}
2018–	Trinidad & Tobago	25	(3)
- * Club domestic league appearances and goals ‡ National team caps and goals as of 8 June 2024

Duane Muckette is a Trinidadian footballer who plays as a midfielder for AC Port of Spain and the Trinidad and Tobago national football team.

== Club career ==
After spells spending time in his native Trinidad, playing college soccer in the United States at the University of South Florida, and in Portugal with Barreirense, Muckette joined USL Championship side Memphis 901 on 8 January 2019, ahead of their inaugural season. In 2022, he joined AC Port of Spain.
