= Richard Roy (footballer) =

Trinidadian footballer

Personal information
- Date of birth: 10 October 1987 (age 39)
- Place of birth: Morvant, Trinidad and Tobago
- Position: Striker

Team information
- Current team: Lochee Harp

Senior career*
Years	Team	Apps	(Gls)
2007–2016	Defence Force		
2016–2017	Hamilton Academical	1	(0)
2017	Broughty Athletic		
2017	NEROCA		
2021–2023	Downfield		
2023–	Lochee Harp		

International career^{‡}
2008–2012	Trinidad and Tobago	6	(1)
- * Club domestic league appearances and goals as of 20:44, 31 March 2023 (UTC) ‡ National team caps and goals as of 07:43, 6 August 2016 (UTC)

Richard Roy (born 10 October 1987) is a Trinidadian international footballer who plays for Scottish club Lochee Harp, as a striker.

He has previously played for Defence Force in his homeland, and Scottish clubs Hamilton Academical and Broughty Athletic.

== Club career ==
Born in Morvant, Roy has played club football in Trinidad and Tobago for Defence Force. He was top scorer of the TT Pro League in the 2011–12 season, scoring 14 goals.

On 5 August 2016, Roy signed for Scottish Premiership club Hamilton Academical on a four-month contract. In December 2016 it was announced that he would leave the club later that month. He officially left at the start of January 2017.

On 27 January 2017, Roy signed for Junior club Broughty Athletic.

On 9 November 2017, Roy signed for I-League club NEROCA.

Roy returned to Scotland to play for Midlands League side Downfield for the 2021–22 season. On 31 March 2023, Roy left Downfield and signed for fellow Midlands League club Lochee Harp on a permanent deal.

== International career ==
He made his international debut for Trinidad and Tobago in 2008.
