= Jamal Gay =

Trinidadian footballer (born 1989)

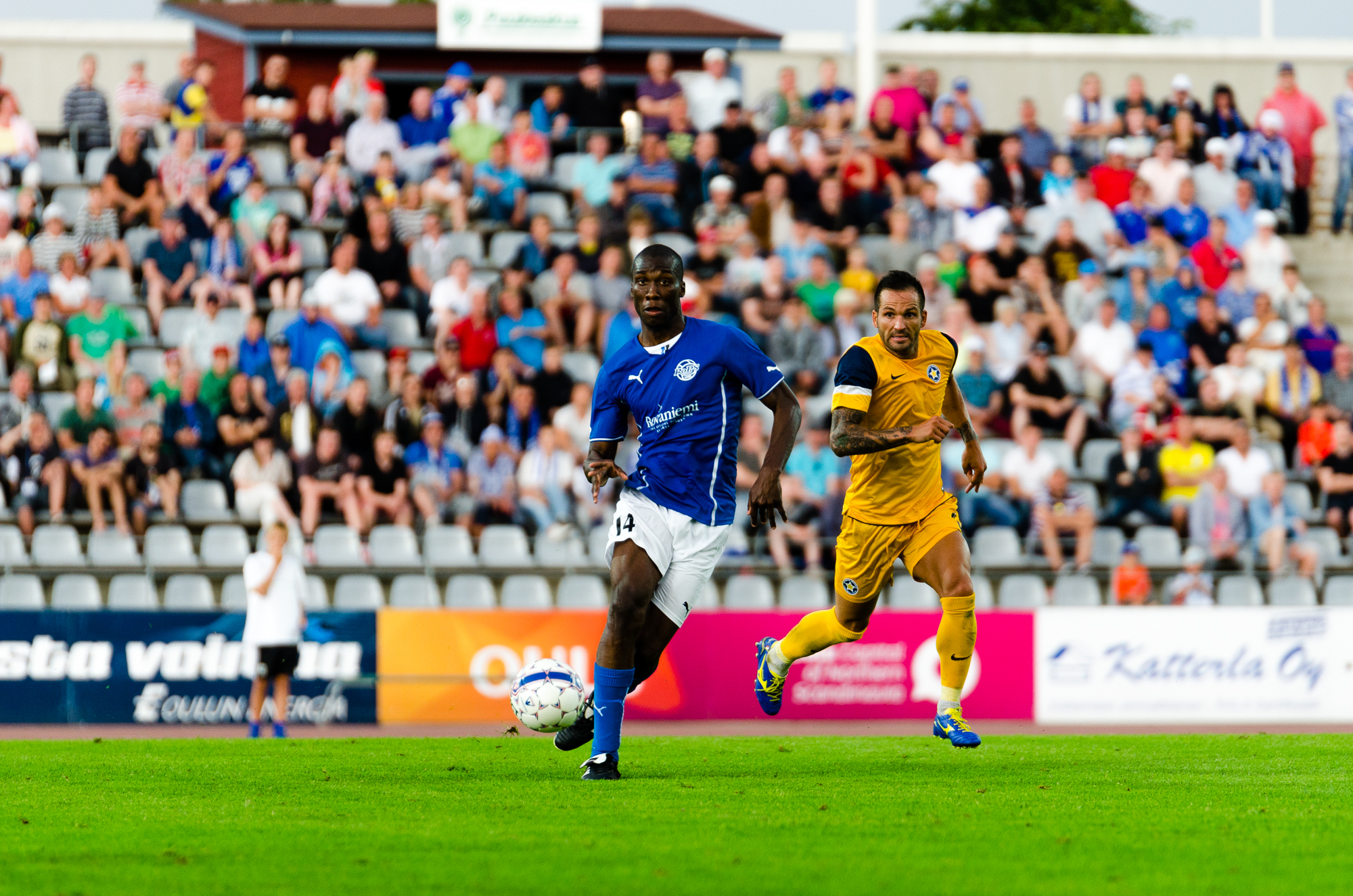
- Gay (left) in 2014 with RoPS

Personal information
- Full name: Jamal Bevon Gay
- Date of birth: 9 February 1989 (age 37)
- Place of birth: La Horquetta, Arima, Trinidad and Tobago
- Height: 1.93 m (6 ft 4 in)
- Position: Forward

Youth career
- 2003: Joe Public
- 2004–2007: El Dorado SC

Senior career*
Years	Team	Apps	(Gls)
2008	Joe Public	5	(1)
2009–2010	Rot-Weiß Oberhausen	2	(0)
2011–2014	Caledonia AIA	35	(20)
2014	→ RoPS (loan)	30	(2)
2015–2017	San Juan Jabloteh	28	(16)
2017	Club Sando		
2018	St. Ann's Rangers		
2018	Central F.C.		

International career
2007–2009	Trinidad & Tobago U20	11	(5)
2008–2014	Trinidad & Tobago	22	(7)
- * Club domestic league appearances and goals

Jamal Bevon Gay (born 9 February 1989) is a Trinidadian former professional footballer who played as a forward. He played abroad with 2. Bundesliga club Rot-Weiß Oberhausen and Veikkausliiga side RoPS. He scored 7 goals from 21 appearances for the Trinidad & Tobago national team. He was a member of Trinidad & Tobago under 23 Olympic team that almost qualified for London games 2012. He was top scorer with 6 goals in 11 matches. He also played for the Trinidad & Tobago U20 at the 2009 FIFA U-20 World Cup.

== Early life ==
Gay was born and raised in the South Arima neighborhood of La Horquetta.

== Club career ==
Gay began his career 2003 with Joe Public and moved after one year to El Dorado Secondary Comprehensive but returned in 2008 to Joe Public. On 29 January 2009, he moved to Rot-Weiß Oberhausen and signed a contract until 30 June 2011, after being successfully on trial at Oberhausen since 13 January 2009. He played his first game for Rot-Weiß Oberhausen on 8 February 2009 against FC Ingolstadt 04 in the 2. Bundesliga. On 31 January 2010, he was released from contract by Rot-Weiß Oberhausen. Gay joined Caledonia AIA in July 2011.

== International career ==
Gay was called up on 18 February 2008 for the game against El Salvador, he played his first game here on 19 March 2008 against El Salvador, formerly presented the Under-20 team. His first goal was on 11 May 2008 against Barbados. He represented his country at 2009 FIFA U-20 World Cup in Egypt. Gay scored his second international goal in his fifth cap as Trinidad and Tobago put three past St Lucia. He scored four goals in one game vs Anguilla in the Caribbean cup.

== Career statistics ==
Scores and results list Trinidad and Tobago's goal tally first, score column indicates score after each Gay goal.

List of international goals scored by Jamal Gay
No.	Date	Venue	Opponent	Score	Result	Competition
1	11 May 2008	Marvin Lee Stadium, Macoya, Trinidad and Tobago	Barbados	1–0	3–0	Friendly
2	21 September 2010	Antigua Recreation Ground, St. John's, Antigua and Barbuda	Saint Lucia	2–0	3–0	Friendly
3	10 October 2012	Warner Park Sporting Complex, Basseterre, Saint Kitts and Nevis	French Guiana	2–1	4–1	2012 Caribbean Cup qualification
4	14 October 2012	Warner Park Sporting Complex, Basseterre, Saint Kitts and Nevis	Anguilla	1–0	10–0	2012 Caribbean Cup qualification
5	14 October 2012	Warner Park Sporting Complex, Basseterre, Saint Kitts and Nevis	Anguilla	3–0	10–0	2012 Caribbean Cup qualification
6	14 October 2012	Warner Park Sporting Complex, Basseterre, Saint Kitts and Nevis	Anguilla	4–0	10–0	2012 Caribbean Cup qualification
7	14 October 2012	Warner Park Sporting Complex, Basseterre, Saint Kitts and Nevis	Anguilla	6–0	10–0	2012 Caribbean Cup qualification
