= Trinidad and Tobago League Cup =

First Citizens Cup
- Founded: 2000
- Abolished: 2018
- Region: Trinidad and Tobago
- Teams: 10
- Last champions: Central (3rd title)
- Most championships: W Connection (8 titles)
- Website: First Citizens Cup
- 2017 First Citizens Cup

The Trinidad and Tobago League Cup, or commonly known as the First Citizens Cup for sponsorship reasons, is the League Cup style football competition open for Trinidad and Tobago teams competing in the country's TT Pro League. Similar to the FA Trophy, it is played on a knockout (single elimination) basis in September and October towards the beginning of each Pro League season. Unlike the FA Trophy, where 36 teams enter each season from the top three tiers of the Trinidad and Tobago football league system and the Secondary Schools Football League, only teams from the TT Pro League compete in the league cup. The knockout tournament was inaugurated in 2000 and is currently sponsored by First Citizens Bank. Although the league cup is one of the three major domestic trophies attainable by Trinidad and Tobago league teams, it is perceived as a lower priority than the league championship and the FA Trophy. The current theme is Where Winners Reign, with TT$110,000 to the winner, TT$20,000 to the runners-up, semifinal winners receive TT$7,000, quarterfinal winners receive TT$5,000 and Play-off round winners receive TT$3,000.

W Connection is the most successful club in the league cup having won the competition eight times, including five consecutive cup titles in 2004–08 and are the current holders of the league cup having defeated Defence Force in the 2017 final.

== History ==
The competition began in 2000, under the name of the League Cup, with San Juan Jabloteh winning the inaugural tournament by defeating Defence Force 1–0 at Marvin Lee Stadium. In 2001, First Citizens Bank began to sponsor the league cup and was officially branded the First Citizens Cup. W Connection and Defence Force claimed their club's first cup title in 2001 and 2002 respectively. The San Juan Kings became the first club to win the title twice having won the league cup again in 2003. W Connection were crowned champions for five consecutive years in 2004–08. However, in 2009, Defence Force claimed their second title and their first trophy in six years with a 1–0 win over Joe Public. The Eastern Lions exacted revenge by defeating Defence Force 3–0 on penalties after the match ended 1–1 the following year in 2010 to claim their first league cup title. Caledonia AIA claimed two consecutive league cup titles in 2011 and 2012.

== Format ==
The competition is open to all clubs of the TT Pro League and is divided into three rounds consisting of single-legged matches. Along with the expansion of the league in 2003 and 2009, the league cup added additional rounds of competition to narrow the number of teams to eight before the quarterfinals. During the first ten years of competition, teams were seeded as determined by their league position at the time of the quarterfinal pairings announcement. However, in 2011, the competition underwent a major format change with the introduction of a group stage and knockout phase. The change was made due to having only six clubs able to enter the competition. Defence Force and Police were unable to compete due to being called into service for increased crime in portions of the country. The group stage featured two groups of three teams competing in a single round-robin. The top two teams in each round advanced to the semifinals of the knockout phase. However, the group stage and knockout phase would only last one season. Beginning in 2012, the competition returned to a knockout tournament with pairings for each round drawn at random. The draw for each round is held at the First Citizens corporate box at the Queen's Park Oval in Port of Spain and is not made until after the scheduled dates for the previous round. The draw also determines which teams will play at home.

Matches in all rounds are single-legged played for 90 minutes duration, at the end of which if the match is still tied, a penalty shootout is used to determine the match winner. Although the current match rules have been place since 2008, the competition began with the quarterfinal and semifinal rounds played as two-legged encounters, whereas the final was decided by a single match. In 2004 each round was converted into single-legged matches played into extra time if the two teams were drawn following regulation.

== Sponsorship ==
The League Cup has been sponsored since 2001. The sponsor has been able to determine the competition's sponsorship name. The list below details who the sponsors have been and what they called the competition:

Period	Sponsor	Name
2000	No main sponsor	League Cup
2001–2013	First Citizens Bank	First Citizens Cup

== Finals ==
=== Results ===
Key
*	Match decided in extra time
^{†}	Match decided by a penalty shootout after regulation time
^{‡}	Match decided by a penalty shootout after extra time

Season	Winner	Score	Runners–up	Venue
2000	San Juan Jabloteh	1–0	Defence Force	Marvin Lee Stadium
2001	W Connection	1–0	Caledonia AIA	Manny Ramjohn Stadium
2002	Defence Force	2–0	W Connection	Hasely Crawford Stadium
2003	San Juan Jabloteh (2)	1–1*	W Connection	Manny Ramjohn Stadium
2004	W Connection (2)	2–2^{‡}	Defence Force	Manny Ramjohn Stadium
2005	W Connection (3)	3–1	San Juan Jabloteh	Manny Ramjohn Stadium
2006	W Connection (4)	3–1	North East Stars	Manny Ramjohn Stadium
2007	W Connection (5)	2–0	Caledonia AIA	Manny Ramjohn Stadium
2008	W Connection (6)	2–2^{†}	Joe Public	Manny Ramjohn Stadium
2009	Defence Force (2)	1–0	Joe Public	Marvin Lee Stadium
2010	Joe Public	1–1^{†}	Defence Force	Marvin Lee Stadium
2011	Caledonia AIA	2–1	T&TEC	Hasely Crawford Stadium
2012	Caledonia AIA (2)	2–1	Defence Force	Hasely Crawford Stadium
2013	Central FC	2–1	Defence Force	Hasely Crawford Stadium
2014	Central FC (2)	1–0	North East Stars	Hasely Crawford Stadium
2015	W. Connection (7)	2–1	Central FC	Hasely Crawford Stadium
2016	Defence Force (3)	1–0	Ma Pau Stars	Hasely Crawford Stadium
2017	W. Connection (8)	3–1	Defence Force	Ato Boldon Stadium
2018	Central FC (3)	2–2^{‡}	Defence Force	Hasely Crawford Stadium

== Results by team ==
Club	Wins	Last final won	Runners-up	Last final lost
W. Connection	8	2017	2	2003
Defence Force	3	2016	7	2018
Central FC	3	2018	1	2015
Caledonia AIA	2	2012	2	2007
San Juan Jabloteh	2	2003	1	2005
Joe Public	1	2010	2	2009
North East Stars	0		2	2014
T&TEC	0		1	2011
Ma Pau Stars	0		1	2016
