= Reon Moore =

Trinidad and Tobago footballer

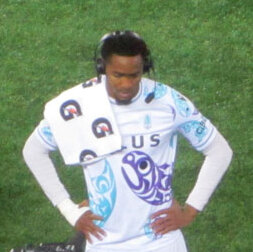
- Moore in 2024

Personal information
- Full name: Reon Dale Moore
- Date of birth: 22 September 1996 (age 30)
- Place of birth: Sangre Grande, Trinidad and Tobago
- Height: 1.75 m (5 ft 9 in)
- Position: Forward

Team information
- Current team: Song Lam Nghe An
- Number: 10

Senior career*
| Years | Team | Apps | (Gls) |
| 2015–2016 | North East Stars | | (1) |
| 2016–2017 | Matura ReUnited | | (1) |
| 2017–2022 | Defence Force | | (9) |
| 2022 | Municipal | 6 | (0) |
| 2023–2024 | Defence Force | | (8) |
| 2024 | Pacific FC | 19 | (3) |
| 2025 | Defence Force | | |
| 2025– | Song Lam Nghe An | 19 | (5) |

International career^{‡}
| 2018– | Trinidad and Tobago | 35 | (11) |
- * Club domestic league appearances and goals as of 7 June 2026 ‡ National team caps and goals as of 30 March 2026

Reon Dale Moore (born 22 September 1996) is a Trinidadian professional footballer who plays as a forward for V.League 1 club Song Lam Nghe An and the Trinidad and Tobago national team.

== Early life ==
Moore was born in Sangre Grande, Trinidad and Tobago.

== Club career ==
In August 2022 Moore joined Guatemalan side Municipal.

In 2023, Moore joined Defence Force ahead of the 2023 TT Premier Football League season.

In March 2024, Moore signed a two-year contract with Canadian Premier League side Pacific FC. At the end of the 2024 season, he agreed to a mutual termination of his contract with the club.

In February 2025, he returned to Defence Force for the 2025 season.

In August 2025, he joined Vietnamese club Song Lam Nghe An in the V.League 1.

== International career ==
On 23 March 2018, Moore made his debut for Trinidad and Tobago in an unofficial friendly against Guadeloupe. He made his official debut on 17 April 2018 in a friendly against Panama. On 2 July 2021, Moore made his competitive debut for Trinidad in 2021 Gold Cup qualifying as a substitute against Montserrat, scoring two goals in a 6–1 win. On 18 July 2021, Moore scored to give Trinidad the lead in their group stage match against Guatemala in the 2021 CONCACAF Gold Cup, which ended in a 1-1 draw. On 25 March 2022, Moore notched a goal in a 9-0 victory over Barbados in the Courts Caribbean Classic, a friendly mini tournament held in Trinidad. On 11 March 2023, Moore scored in a 1-0 victory over Jamaica in one of two away friendlies against the latter.

== Career statistics ==
As of match played 8 June 2024

Scores and results list Trinidad and Tobago's goal tally first, score column indicates score after each Moore goal.

List of international goals scored by Reon Moore
| No. | Date | Venue | Cap | Opponent | Score | Result | Competition |
|---|---|---|---|---|---|---|---|
| 1. | 2 July 2021 | DRV PNK Stadium, Fort Lauderdale, United States | 4 | Montserrat | 5–1 | 6–1 | 2021 CONCACAF Gold Cup qualification |
| 2. | 2 July 2021 | DRV PNK Stadium, Fort Lauderdale, United States | 4 | Montserrat | 6–1 | 6–1 | 2021 CONCACAF Gold Cup qualification |
| 3. | 18 July 2021 | Toyota Stadium, Frisco, United States | 8 | Guatemala | 1–0 | 1–1 | 2021 CONCACAF Gold Cup |
| 4. | 25 March 2022 | Hasely Crawford Stadium, Port of Spain, Trinidad and Tobago | 10 | Barbados | 8–0 | 9–0 | Friendly |
| 5. | 11 March 2023 | Montego Bay Sports Complex, Montego Bay, Jamaica | 17 | Jamaica | 1–0 | 1–0 | Friendly |
| 6. | 13 October 2023 | Hasely Crawford Stadium, Port of Spain, Trinidad and Tobago | 23 | Guatemala | 2–2 | 3–2 | 2023–24 CONCACAF Nations League |
| 7. | 17 October 2023 | Ergilio Hato Stadium, Willemstad, Curaçao | 24 | Curaçao | 1–3 | 3–5 | 2023–24 CONCACAF Nations League |
| 8. | 20 November 2023 | Hasely Crawford Stadium, Port of Spain, Trinidad and Tobago | 26 | United States | 1–1 | 2–1 | 2023–24 CONCACAF Nations League |
| 9. | 5 June 2024 | Hasely Crawford Stadium, Port of Spain, Trinidad and Tobago | 27 | Grenada | 2–2 | 2–2 | 2026 FIFA World Cup qualification |
| 10. | 8 June 2024 | SKNFA Technical Center, Basseterre, Saint Kitts and Nevis | 28 | Bahamas | 5–0 | 7–1 | 2026 FIFA World Cup qualification |
| 11. | 27 March 2026 | Bunyodkor Stadium, Tashkent, Uzbekistan | 33 | Venezuela | 1–0 | 1–4 | 2026 FIFA Series |
