= Sylvester Teesdale =

Trinidad and Tobago footballer

Personal information
- Date of birth: 12 August 1983 (age 43)
- Place of birth: Trinidad and Tobago
- Position: Striker

Senior career*
Years	Team	Apps	(Gls)
- United Petrotrin F.C.
- North East Stars F.C.
- F.C. South End
-2012	T&TEC Sports Club		(9+)
2012	Club Sando F.C.		
2012-2013	T&TEC Sports Club		(3)
2013-2014	Point Fortin Civic F.C.		
- Petrotrin Palo Seco
2015/16-2016/17	Point Fortin Civic F.C.		(4)
- Siparia Spurs
- Erin FC
- Club Sando Uprising Youths

International career
2012	Trinidad and Tobago	1	(1)
- * Club domestic league appearances and goals

Sylvester Teesdale (born 12 August 1983 in Trinidad and Tobago) is a Trinidadian retired footballer.

== Career ==
In 2012, Teesdale debuted for Trinidad and Tobago in a 10–0 win over Anguilla, scoring a goal in what would be his only appearance for his country.
