= Hughtun Hector =

Trinidadian footballer (born 1984)

Personal information
- Date of birth: 16 October 1984 (age 42)
- Place of birth: Point Fortin, Trinidad and Tobago
- Height: 1.77 m (5 ft 10 in)
- Position: Attacking midfielder

Youth career
- W Connection

Senior career*
Years	Team	Apps	(Gls)
2008–2011	W Connection		
2011–2013	Sông Lam Nghệ An	45	(14)
2013–2015	Hanoi T&T	26	(4)
2015–2017	W Connection		(9)
2018	Point Fortin Civic		(1)
2019–2020	Deportivo Point Fortin		(4)
2020	Club Sando		

International career
2009–2017	Trinidad and Tobago	40	(5)
- * Club domestic league appearances and goals

Hughtun Hector (born 16 October 1984) is a Trinidadian former professional footballer who played as an attacking midfielder.

== Club career ==
Hector began his career in the youth ranks of W Connection before making his professional debut with the senior squad in 2008. Since then he has been one of the top midfielders in Trinidad and Tobago. While with Connection he has helped the club in capturing two domestic cups and the 2009 CFU Club Championship. During Connection's title run in the 2009 CFU Club Championship Hector recorded a hat-trick in a 5–0 rout over Centre Bath Estate. He ended as the competitions second leading scorer with 5 goals. On 30 July 2009, he scored the equalizing goal for Connection in a 2–2 draw with New York Red Bulls in a 2009–10 CONCACAF Champions League match.

His play with Connection and Trinidad and Tobago helped Hector to draw the attention of several foreign clubs. During October 2010 he went on trial with Ukraine top flight club PFC Sevastopol. During March 2011 it was reported that Hector would go on trial with New York Red Bulls in hopes of a securing a contract with the Major League Soccer club. After spending two years at Sông Lam Nghệ An he signed for Hanoi T&T for the 2014 season.

== International career ==
Hector is a member of the Trinidad and Tobago national team.

== Career statistics ==
As of 24 September 2016

Scores and results list Trinidad and Tobago's goal tally first.

Goal	Date	Venue	Opponent	Score	Result	Competition
1.	21 September 2010	Antigua Recreation Ground, St. John's, Antigua and Barbuda	Saint Lucia	3–0	3–0	Friendly
2.	2 November 2010	Manny Ramjohn Stadium, Marabella, Trinidad and Tobago	Saint Vincent and the Grenadines	6–2	6–2	2010 Caribbean Championship qualification
3.	6 November 2010	Manny Ramjohn Stadium, Marabella, Trinidad and Tobago	Haiti	1–0	4–0	2010 Caribbean Championship qualification
4.	6 November 2010	Manny Ramjohn Stadium, Marabella, Trinidad and Tobago	Haiti	4–0	4–0	2010 Caribbean Championship qualification
5	30 November 2010	Stade Pierre-Aliker, Fort-de-France, Martinique	Martinique	1–0	1–0	2010 Caribbean Championship
6.	11 October 2011	Hasely Crawford Stadium, Port of Spain, Trinidad and Tobago	Barbados	4–0	4–0	2014 FIFA World Cup qualification
7.	10 October 2012	Warner Park Sporting Complex, Basseterre, Saint Kitts and Nevis	French Guiana	1–1	4–1	2012 Caribbean Cup qualification

== Honors ==
W Connection

- CFU Club Championship: 2009
- First Citizens Cup: 2008
- Trinidad and Tobago Goal Shield: 2009
