= Morvant =

Community in Trinidad and Tobago

Coordinates: 10°39′N 61°28′W

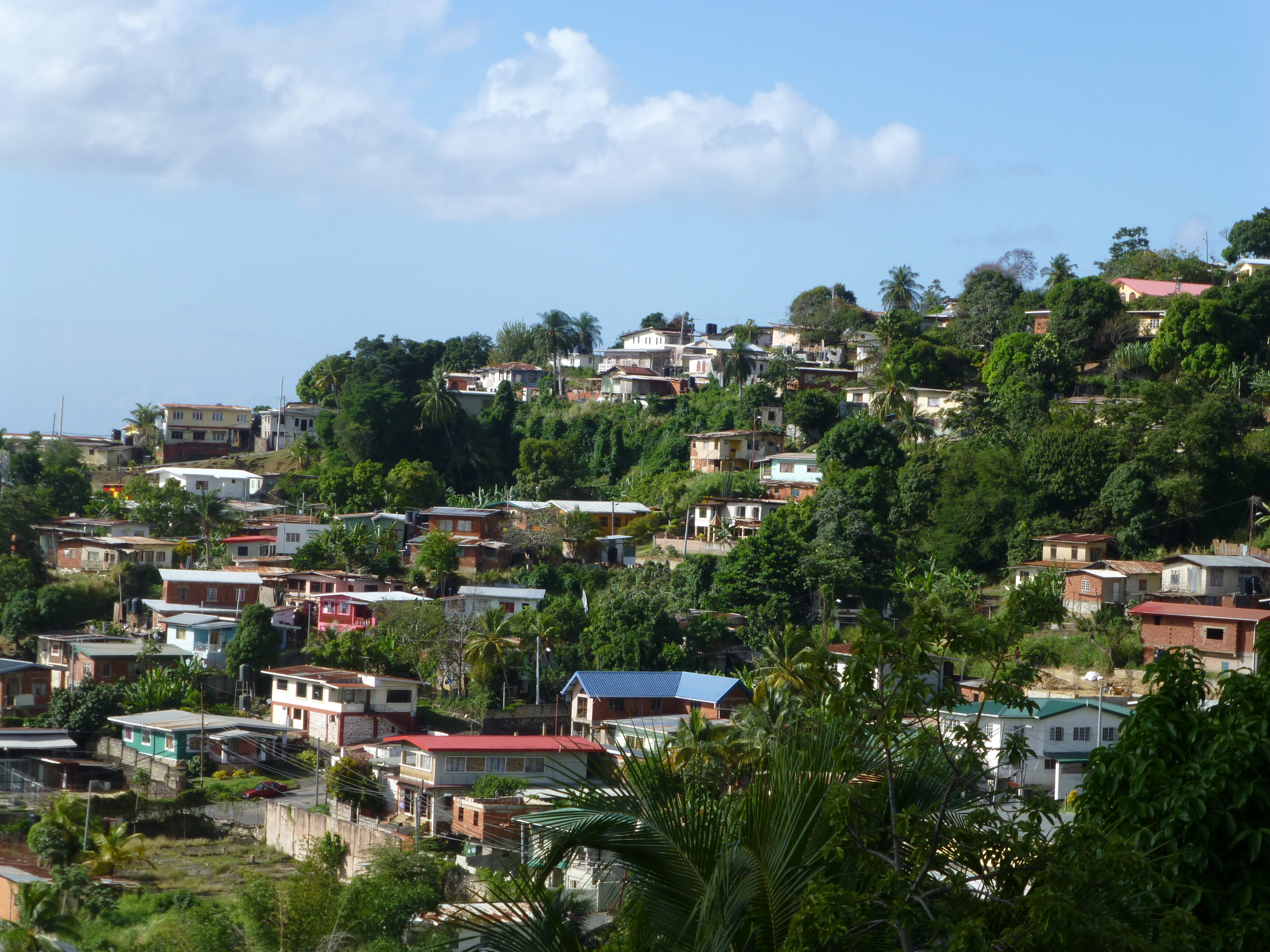
Morvant

Morvant (pronounced, in the local English dialect, "mor-vuh") is a community in Trinidad and Tobago located east of Port of Spain in the region of San Juan-Laventille.

== Location ==
Morvant is located in the southern foothills of the Northern Range of the island of Trinidad. It is bordered by the Lady Young Road on the North and penetrates the communities of Mon Repos on the North East, Barataria on the East, Laventille on the South West and Belmont on the West.

Morvant was originally a village that housed many working-class families who made their livelihoods within the homes and businesses of the (relatively) more affluent middle-class people living in the nearby capital city of Port of Spain. There are still many older Trinidadians who can remember and tell the stories about how, in the late 1940s and early 1950s—long before the political advent of Eric Williams and the PNM—the Trinidad government undertook in Morvant an innovative community-based housing development program that brought greater prosperity and stability to Morvant. The program was patterned on the community development and housing strategy that was being used in Puerto Rico and, some years later, was used in Cuba. Through this program, the government solicited the interest of several Morvant families and encouraged them to assist one another in restoring older homes and in building new homes in Morvant. As a result of this housing development approach, many new families joined the older Morvant residents and came to belong and strengthen this vibrant, resourceful and proud working-class community.

As has happened within other older communities in Trinidad and Tobago, the Morvant community has long outgrown its original borders. Today, it is a sprawling area that has gained negative focus due to pockets of criminal activity and increased media reporting that gains greater publicity by focusing on crime and calamity. Statistically however, the levels of reported crimes seem lower than that of other area of similar population density in the country. And this may well be attributed to Morvant's historical development.

Mainly because of its proximity to Port of Spain and more than likely also due to its innovative community development history, Morvant has a reliable supply system of basic amenities i.e. water, electricity and sanitation services. Public transport is quite prompt and there are free Early Childhood Learning Centres next to most primary schools - all of which are funded by the government. Health care has improved as the health centre was relocated and facilities were upgraded.

In Morvant recreational facilities are quite satisfactory, there are numerous basketball courts in the area and there is a recreational ground where the youths can play football or practice athletics. Much of the country's traffic passes through Morvant as one of Trinidad's major roads runs through here (Lady Young Road). It is used as an alternative route to Port-of-Spain; Trinidad's capital city. Also, because of Morvant's convenient location near to the capital city, most of the children who reside in Morvant can attend school in the capital or in the neighbouring suburbs such as Belmont.

== Politics ==
Morvant is part of the Laventille East/Morvant constituency for elections to the Parliament of Trinidad and Tobago.
