= Jason Marcano =

Trinidad and Tobago footballer (1983–2019)

Personal information
- Full name: Jason Marcano
- Date of birth: 30 December 1983
- Place of birth: Arima, Trinidad and Tobago
- Date of death: 30 May 2019 (aged 35)
- Place of death: Arouca, Trinidad and Tobago
- Height: 1.83 m (6 ft 0 in)
- Position: Forward

Senior career*
Years	Team	Apps	(Gls)
2005–2006	W Connection		
2006–2012	San Juan Jabloteh	132	(28)
2012–2013	St. Ann's Rangers		(2)
2013–2018	Central	~100	(45)
2018	San Juan Jabloteh		(3)

International career^{‡}
- Trinidad and Tobago U20
2003	Trinidad and Tobago U23		
2007–2016	Trinidad and Tobago	12	(0)
- * Club domestic league appearances and goals as of 2 June 2019 ‡ National team caps and goals as of 2 June 2019

Jason Marcano (30 December 1983 – 30 May 2019) was a Trinidad and Tobago international footballer who played as a forward.

== Personal life ==
Marcano was born to parents Maria John and Steve Marcano, the only boy with five sisters. He started his football career at the age of 10 while attending Arima West Government Primary School, he later went on to play for the under 20 team and the Trinidad and Tobago under 23 Olympic team in 2003.

Marcano lived in his home town of Arima with his wife and son. He was a cousin of professional footballer Elton John, with whom he played at San Juan Jabloteh and Central.

== Death ==
On 30 May 2019, Marcano was driving along Trinidad's Eastern Main Road near Arouca when he lost control of his vehicle and crashed into a wall, killing him.

== Honours ==
San Juan Jabloteh

- TT Pro League: 2008
- Trinidad and Tobago FA Trophy: 2010–11

Central

- TT Pro League: 2014–15, 2015–16, 2016–17
- Trinidad and Tobago Goal Shield: 2014
- CFU Club Championship: 2015, 2016
- Trinidad and Tobago Charity Shield: 2015
- Trinidad and Tobago Pro Bowl: 2015
- Trinidad and Tobago League Cup: 2018

Individual

- TT Pro League Youth MVP: 2005
