= Marabella =

Coordinates: 10°18′N 61°27′W

- Town
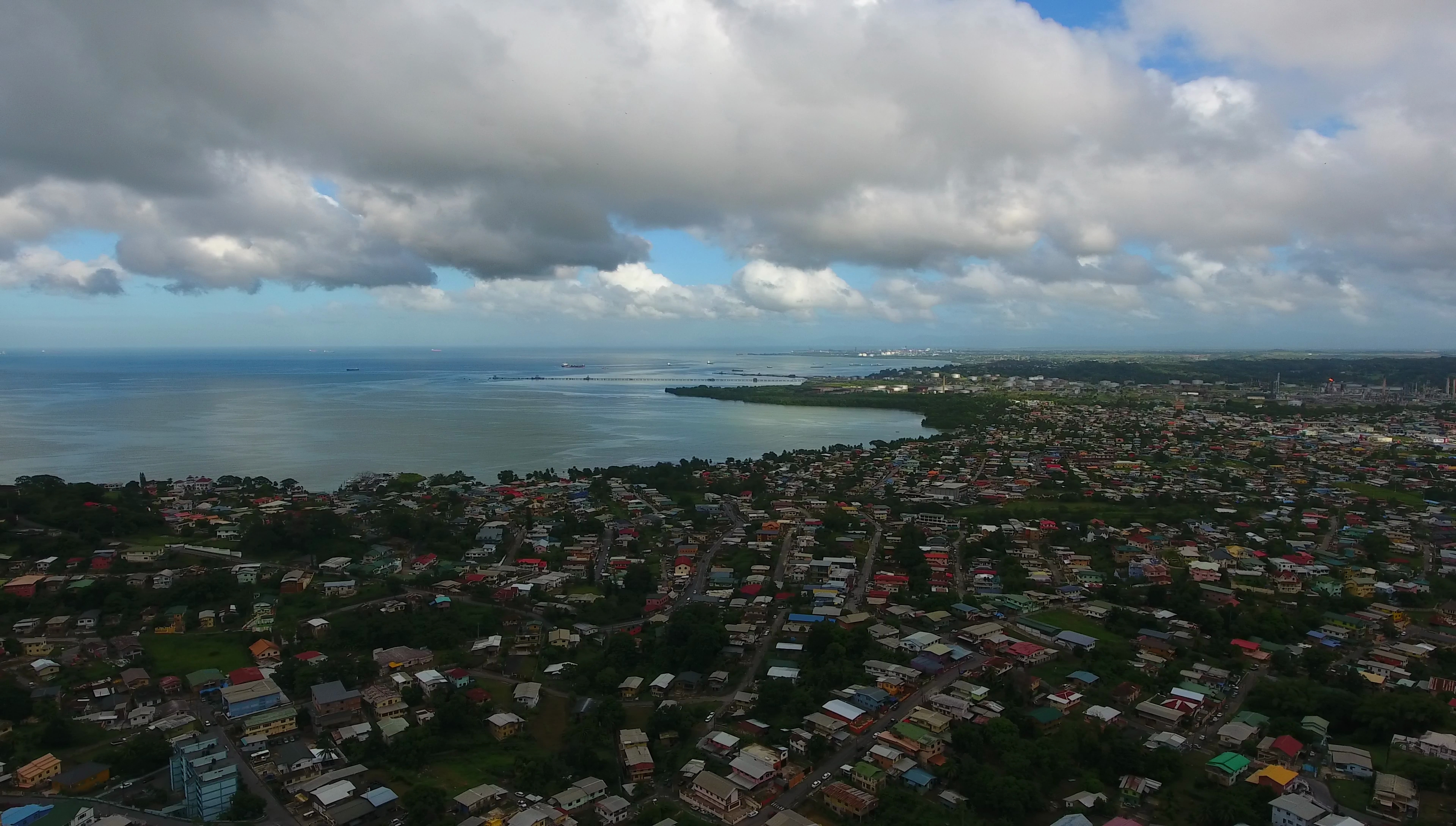
- Marabella
- Interactive map of Marabella
- Country: Trinidad and Tobago
- Region: San Fernando

Population (2011)
  - Total: 12,508
- Time zone: UTC-4 (AST)
- Postal code(s): 61xxxx
- Area code: 868
- Telephone Exchange: 658

Marabella is a town in southern Trinidad, located between San Fernando (to the south) and Pointe-à-Pierre (to the north). Early 19th-century maps highlighted it as Marabella Junction because of the railway intersection to Williamsville and other central areas.

Marabella was home to the Union Park Turf Club (a horse racing venue) later converted to the Manny Ramjohn Stadium, one of the five major stadiums in Trinidad and Tobago, the others being the Ato Boldon, Larry Gomes, Hasley Crawford and the Dwight Yorke Stadium.

Nicknamed "The City that Never Sleeps," the city is always active, as its nightlife of food vending and bars goes almost 24/7. Marabella provides a melting-pot for the wide ethnic groups to "lime" and "ole talk".

Marabella's location near the Solomon Hochoy highway and Southern Main Road makes accessibility to all parts of Trinidad easy. This accessibility combined with its commercial infrastructure makes Marabella a prime residential area. Today it is referred to as the "Commercial Hub of Southern Trinidad".

Marabella, like many other middle-class neighbourhoods in Trinidad, does have a contingent of its population living below the poverty line in areas such as Bay Road and "The Old Train Line". Marabella is also known for its highly skilled sports personnel, including Horace Tuitt (track and field).
