= First Citizens Bank =

American financial services company

First Citizens BancShares, Inc.

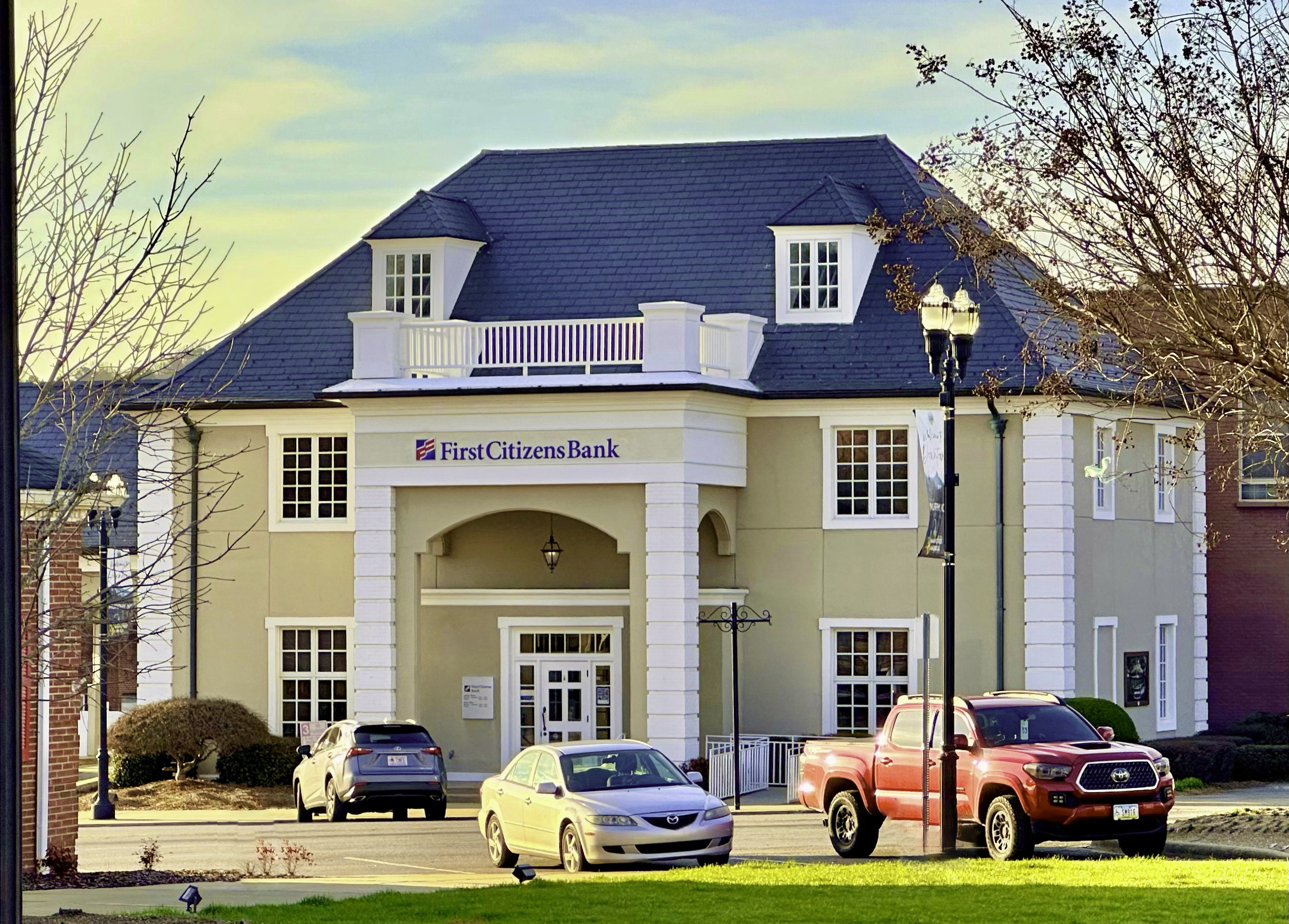
- First Citizens Bank branch in Murphy, North Carolina
- Type: Public
- Traded as: Nasdaq: FCNCA (Class A); Russell 1000 component
- Industry: Banking
- Founded: 1898; 128 years ago
- Headquarters: Raleigh, North Carolina, U.S.
- Area served: United States
- Key people: Frank B. Holding Jr. (CEO & chairperson)
- Products: Commercial bank; Investment bank
- Revenue: ▲US$5.55 billion (2022)
- Net income: ▲US$1.05 billion (2022)
- Total assets: ▲US$209 billion (Q2 2023)
- Total equity: ▲US$19.771 billion (Q2 2023)
- Owner: Holding family
- Number of employees: 10,375 (2022)
- Divisions: First Citizens Bank; Silicon Valley Bank
- Subsidiaries: SVB Global Services India LLP
- Website: firstcitizens.com

First Citizens Bancshares, Inc. is a bank holding company based in Raleigh, North Carolina, and one of the largest banks in the United States. Its primary subsidiary is First Citizens Bank, which operates over 500 branches in 23 states. A second subsidiary is Silicon Valley Bank, which operates 39 offices in 15 states.

For three generations, the bank has been led by the family of Robert Powell Holding, who joined the bank in 1918 and served as president from 1935 to 1957.

== History ==
The bank opened on March 1, 1898, as Bank of Smithfield. It evolved into First National Bank of Smithfield and merged with Citizens National Bank to become First and Citizens National Bank. In 1929, it changed its name to First Citizens Bank and Trust Company. In 1986, it reorganized as a holding company, First Citizens BancShares, Inc. As of 2024, it is the 15th largest bank in the United States, with $221 billion in assets and $152 billion in deposits and $88 billion in liquidity.

First Citizens Bancshares made its debut on the Fortune 500 list in 2024, ranking 182nd overall. The bank was also named by American Banker in 2024 as the top-performing large bank, among banks with at least $50 billion of assets.

=== Acquisitions and divestitures ===
Year	Company	Notes
1971	The Haynes Bank of Cliffside, North Carolina	
1974	The Bank of Coleridge in Ramseur, North Carolina and The Bank of Commerce in Charlotte, North Carolina	
1979	Bank of Conway in Conway, North Carolina	
1981	Commercial & Farmers Bank of Rural Hall, North Carolina and Commercial & Savings Bank of Boonville, North Carolina	
1983	Peoples Bank of North Carolina in Madison, North Carolina	
1985	First State Bank of Winterville, North Carolina, Farmers Bank of Pilot Mountain, North Carolina, and Farmers Bank of Sunbury in Sunbury, North Carolina	
1990	Heritage Federal Savings and Loan Association of Monroe, North Carolina and North Carolina Savings and Loan Association of Charlotte, North Carolina	
1991	Mutual Savings and Loan Association of Charlotte, North Carolina and First Federal Savings Bank of Hendersonville, North Carolina	
1993	Caldwell Savings Bank of Lenoir, North Carolina, Surety Federal Savings and Loan Association, FA of Morganton, North Carolina, and Pioneer Savings Bank of Rocky Mount, North Carolina	
1994	The Bank of Bladenboro in Bladenboro, North Carolina, Edgecomb Homestead Savings Bank of Tarboro, North Carolina, and First Republic Savings Bank of Roanoke Rapids, North Carolina	
1995	First Investors Savings Bank of Whiteville, North Carolina and State Bank of Fayetteville, North Carolina	
1996	First-Citizens Bank & Trust Company of Lawrenceville, Virginia, Peoples Savings Bank of Wilmington, North Carolina, and Summit Savings Bank of Sanford, North Carolina	
1997	First Savings Bank of Rockingham County in Reidsville, North Carolina	
1998	First Citizens Bank & Trust Company of White Sulphur Springs, West Virginia	
2003	Avery County Bank of Newland, North Carolina	
2009	U.S. Bancorp acquired the bond trustee business of First Citizens Bank	
2009	Temecula Valley Bank of Temecula, California	
2009	Venture Bank of Lacey, Washington	
2010	Sun American Bank of Boca Raton, Florida	
2010	First Regional Bank of Los Angeles, California	
2011	United Western Bank of Denver, Colorado	
2011	Colorado Capital Bank of Castle Rock, Colorado	
2011	In-house merger with IronStone Bank	
2013	1st Financial Corp. of Hendersonville, North Carolina	
2014	First Citizens Bank of South Carolina	
2015	Capitol City Bank and Trust Company of Atlanta, Georgia	
2016	North Milwaukee State Bank of Milwaukee	
2016	Cordia Bancorp Inc. of Midlothian, Virginia	
2016	First CornerStone Bank of King of Prussia, Pennsylvania	
2017	Harvest Community Bank of Pennsville, New Jersey	
2017	Guaranty Bank of Milwaukee, Wisconsin	
2018	Palmetto Heritage Bancshares Inc. of Pawleys Island, South Carolina	
2019	Biscayne Bank of Coconut Grove	
2019	First South Bancorp, Inc. of Spartanburg, South Carolina	
2020	Entegra Financial Corp.	
2020	Community Financial Holding Company, Inc. and Gwinnett Community Bank	
2022	CIT Group	
2023	Silicon Valley Bank's deposits and loans following its collapse	
