= Morvant Caledonia United =

Trinidadian football club

- Full name: Morvant Caledonia United
- Nicknames: The Stallions, Cale
- Short name: MCU
- Founded: 1979; 47 years ago
- Ground: Hasely Crawford Stadium; Port of Spain, Trinidad and Tobago
- Capacity: 23,000
- Owner: Jamaal Shabazz
- Managing Director: Ricarda Nelson
- Manager: Jerry Moe
- League: TT Pro League
- 2025–26: TT Pro League, 12th

Morvant Caledonia United (formerly known as Caledonia AIA) is a professional football team in Trinidad and Tobago's top-level TT Pro League. It is based in Morvant; its home stadium is Hasely Crawford Stadium.

== History ==
The Caledonia AIA Football Club was founded in May 1979 by a group of schoolboys from the Morvant, Laventille, San Juan and Barataria environs; one of whom included current owner Jamaal Shabazz. The Club has a franchise in the TT Pro League and runs a full professional team; employing 28 players and 7 staff on a full-time basis. Apart from the professional team the Club runs a Youth Academy and Youth teams in Under 14, Under 16 and Under 18 age groups, catering for over just over one hundred children at a recreational level. Caledonia AIA was crowned Caribbean Club Champions in 2012 and represented the Caribbean in the CONCACAF Champions League.

== Club honours ==
=== Domestic ===
- FA Trophy
  - Winners (3): 2008, 2011–12, 2012–13
  - Runners-up (1): 2007
- First Citizens Cup
  - Winners (2): 2011, 2012
  - Runners-up (2): 2001, 2007
- Digicel Pro Bowl
  - Winners (1): 2008
  - Runners-up (2): 2009, 2012
- Lucozade Sport Goal Shield
  - Winners (1): 2012

=== Continental ===
- CFU Club Championship
  - Winners (1): 2012
  - Runners-up (1): 1998

== Staff ==
- Technical Director: Jamaal Shabazz
- Head Coach: Jerry Moe
- Assistant Coach/Youth Academy Director: Rajesh Latchoo
- Assistant Coach: Abdallah Phillips
- Goalkeeper Coach: Steve Frederick
- Physio: Jason Pilgrim
