= United States Virgin Islands national soccer team results =

This page details the match results and statistics of the United States Virgin Islands national soccer team.

== Key ==
Key to matches

- Att.=Match attendance
- (H)=Home ground
- (A)=Away ground
- (N)=Neutral ground

Key to record by opponent

- Pld=Games played
- W=Games won
- D=Games drawn
- L=Games lost
- GF=Goals for
- GA=Goals against

== Results ==
U.S. Virgin Islands' score is shown first in each case.

No.	Date	Venue	Opponents	Score	Competition	U.S. Virgin Islands scorers	Att.	Ref.
1	March 22, 1998	(H)	British Virgin Islands	1–0	Friendly	Unknown	—	
2	February 26, 1999	Thomas Robinson Stadium, Nassau (N)	Turks and Caicos Islands	2–2	1999 Caribbean Cup qualification	Unknown	—	
3	February 28, 1999	Thomas Robinson Stadium, Nassau (N)	Bahamas	0–0	1999 Caribbean Cup qualification		—	
4	January 28, 2000	(H)	Saint Lucia	0–9	Friendly		—	
5	January 30, 2000	(H)	Saint Lucia	0–2	Friendly		—	
6	March 5, 2000	Arnos Vale Stadium, Kingstown (A)	Saint Vincent and the Grenadines	0–9	2002 FIFA World Cup qualification		4,000	
7	March 19, 2000	Paul E. Joseph Stadium, Frederiksted (H)	Saint Vincent and the Grenadines	1–5	2002 FIFA World Cup qualification	Santos	425	
8	March 24, 2001	(A)	British Virgin Islands	0–2	Friendly		—	
9	April 10, 2001	Stade Sylvio Cator, Port-au-Prince (N)	Haiti	1–12	2001 Caribbean Cup qualification	Unknown	—	
10	April 12, 2001	Stade Sylvio Cator, Port-au-Prince (N)	Guadeloupe	0–11	2001 Caribbean Cup qualification		—	
11	April 14, 2001	Stade Sylvio Cator, Port-au-Prince (N)	Saint Lucia	1–14	2001 Caribbean Cup qualification	Unknown	—	
12	August 16, 2002	Instituto Preparatorio de Menores, Santo Domingo (H)	Dominican Republic	1–6	2003 CONCACAF Gold Cup qualification	Sheppard	—	
13	August 18, 2002	Instituto Preparatorio de Menores, Santo Domingo (A)	Dominican Republic	1–5	2003 CONCACAF Gold Cup qualification	Sheppard	—	
14	January 30, 2004	A. O. Shirley Recreation Ground, Road Town (A)	British Virgin Islands	0–5	Triangular Tournament		—	
15	January 31, 2004	A. O. Shirley Recreation Ground, Road Town (N)	Dominica	0–5	Triangular Tournament		—	
16	February 18, 2004	Lionel Roberts Park, Charlotte Amalie (H)	Saint Kitts and Nevis	0–4	2006 FIFA World Cup qualification		225	
17	March 31, 2004	Warner Park, Basseterre (A)	Saint Kitts and Nevis	0–7	2006 FIFA World Cup qualification		800	
18	September 25, 2004	A. O. Shirley Recreation Ground, Road Town (A)	British Virgin Islands	1–2	Friendly	Challenger	—	
19	November 24, 2004	Independence Park, Kingston (N)	Haiti	0–11	2005 Caribbean Cup qualification		250	
20	November 26, 2004	Independence Park, Kingston (N)	Jamaica	1–11	2005 Caribbean Cup qualification	Lauro	4,200	
21	November 28, 2004	Independence Park, Kingston (N)	Saint Martin	0–0	2005 Caribbean Cup qualification		200	
22	September 27, 2006	Lionel Roberts Park, Charlotte Amalie (N)	Bermuda	0–6	2007 Caribbean Cup qualification		150	
23	October 1, 2006	Lionel Roberts Park, Charlotte Amalie (N)	Dominican Republic	1–6	2007 Caribbean Cup qualification	Pierre	250	
24	March 14, 2008	A. O. Shirley Recreation Ground, Road Town (A)	British Virgin Islands	0–0	Friendly		—	
25	March 15, 2008	A. O. Shirley Recreation Ground, Road Town (A)	British Virgin Islands	1–1	Friendly	Augustus	—	
26	March 26, 2008	Grenada National Stadium, St. George's (A)	Grenada	0–10	2010 FIFA World Cup qualification		3,000	
27	June 19, 2011	Ronald Webster Park, The Valley (A)	Anguilla	0–0	Friendly		550	
28	July 3, 2011	Lionel Roberts Park, Charlotte Amalie (H)	British Virgin Islands	2–0	2014 FIFA World Cup qualification	Lesmond, Klopp	350	
29	July 10, 2011	A. O. Shirley Recreation Ground, Road Town (A)	British Virgin Islands	2–1	2014 FIFA World Cup qualification	Thomas, Klopp	600	
30	September 2, 2011	Stade Sylvio Cator, Port-au-Prince (A)	Haiti	0–6	2014 FIFA World Cup qualification		12,000	
31	September 6, 2011	Paul E. Joseph Stadium, Frederiksted (H)	Antigua and Barbuda	1–8	2014 FIFA World Cup qualification	Browne	250	
32	October 7, 2011	Paul E. Joseph Stadium, Frederiksted (H)	Haiti	0–7	2014 FIFA World Cup qualification		406	
33	October 11, 2011	Sir Vivian Richards Stadium, Saint George (A)	Antigua and Barbuda	0–10	2014 FIFA World Cup qualification		1,500	
34	November 11, 2011	Paul E. Joseph Stadium, Frederiksted (H)	Curaçao	0–3	2014 FIFA World Cup qualification		210	
35	November 15, 2011	Ergilio Hato Stadium, Willemstad (A)	Curaçao	1–6	2014 FIFA World Cup qualification	Cornelius	2,000	
36	May 30, 2014	Blakes Estate Stadium, Saint John's (N)	Montserrat	0–1	2014 Caribbean Cup qualification		—	
37	June 1, 2014	Blakes Estate Stadium, Saint John's (N)	Bonaire	1–2	2014 Caribbean Cup qualification	Taylor	—	
38	March 8, 2015	Antigua Recreation Ground, St. John's (A)	Antigua and Barbuda	0–2	Friendly		—	
39	March 22, 2015	Barbados National Stadium, Saint Michael (A)	Barbados	1–0	2018 FIFA World Cup qualification	Browne	2,300	
40	March 26, 2015	Addelita Cancryn Junior High School Ground, Charlotte Amalie (H)	Barbados	0–4	2018 FIFA World Cup qualification		410	
41	March 26, 2016	Raoul Illidge Sports Complex, Philipsburg (A)	Sint Maarten	2–1	2017 Caribbean Cup qualification	Herring, Wrensford	—	
42	March 29, 2016	Addelita Cancryn Junior High School Ground, Charlotte Amalie (H)	Grenada	1–2	2017 Caribbean Cup qualification	Wrensford	—	
43	June 4, 2016	Addelita Cancryn Junior High School Ground, Charlotte Amalie (H)	Guyana	0–7	2017 Caribbean Cup qualification		—	
44	June 7, 2016	Ergilio Hato Stadium, Willemstad (A)	Curaçao	0–7	2017 Caribbean Cup qualification		—	
45	September 9, 2018	IMG Academy, Bradenton (H)	Canada	0–8	2019–20 CONCACAF Nations League qualifying		150	
46	October 12, 2018	IMG Academy, Bradenton (H)	Curaçao	0–5	2019–20 CONCACAF Nations League qualifying		—	
47	November 18, 2018	Wildey Turf, Wildey (A)	Barbados	0–3	2019–20 CONCACAF Nations League qualifying		—	
48	March 22, 2019	Raymond E. Guishard Technical Centre, The Valley (A)	Anguilla	3–0	2019–20 CONCACAF Nations League qualifying	Mack, Pierre, Dennis	—	
49	September 5, 2019	Bethlehem Soccer Stadium, Upper Bethlehem (H)	Cayman Islands	0–2	2019–20 CONCACAF Nations League		—	
50	September 8, 2019	Raymond E. Guishard Technical Centre, The Valley (A)	Saint Martin	2–1	2019–20 CONCACAF Nations League	Dennis, Joseph	—	
51	October 12, 2019	Wildey Turf, Wildey (A)	Barbados	0–1	2019–20 CONCACAF Nations League		—	
52	October 15, 2019	Bethlehem Soccer Stadium, Upper Bethlehem (H)	Barbados	0–4	2019–20 CONCACAF Nations League		—	
53	November 16, 2019	Truman Bodden Sports Complex, George Town (A)	Cayman Islands	0–1	2019–20 CONCACAF Nations League		—	
54	November 19, 2019	Bethlehem Soccer Stadium, Upper Bethlehem (H)	Saint Martin	1–2	2019–20 CONCACAF Nations League	McGuiness	—	
55	March 21, 2021	DRV PNK Stadium, Fort Lauderdale (N)	Anguilla	0–0	Friendly		—	
56	March 27, 2021	Bethlehem Soccer Stadium, Upper Bethlehem (H)	Antigua and Barbuda	0–3	2022 FIFA World Cup qualification		0	
57	March 30, 2021	Kirani James Athletic Stadium, St. George's (A)	Grenada	0–1	2022 FIFA World Cup qualification		0	
58	June 2, 2021	Estadio Panamericano, San Cristóbal (A)	Montserrat	0–4	2022 FIFA World Cup qualification		0	
59	June 5, 2021	Bethlehem Soccer Stadium, Upper Bethlehem (H)	El Salvador	0–7	2022 FIFA World Cup qualification		150	
60	June 3, 2022	Stadion Rignaal Jean Francisca, Willemstad (N)	Sint Maarten	1–1	2022–23 CONCACAF Nations League	Mack		
61	June 6, 2022	Bethlehem Soccer Stadium, Upper Bethlehem (H)	Turks and Caicos Islands	3–2	2022–23 CONCACAF Nations League	Browne, Mills, Mack		
62	June 11, 2022	Bethlehem Soccer Stadium, Upper Bethlehem (H)	Bonaire	0–2	2022–23 CONCACAF Nations League			
63	June 14, 2022	Stadion Rignaal Jean Francisca, Willemstad (N)	Bonaire	0–2	2022–23 CONCACAF Nations League			
64	March 25, 2023	TCIFA National Academy, Providenciales (A)	Turks and Caicos Islands	0–1	2022–23 CONCACAF Nations League			
65	March 28, 2023	Bethlehem Soccer Stadium, Upper Bethlehem (H)	Sint Maarten	1–2	2022–23 CONCACAF Nations League	Kendall		
66	September 7, 2023	Bethlehem Soccer Stadium, Upper Bethlehem (H)	Cayman Islands	2–2	2023–24 CONCACAF Nations League	St. Louis		
67	October 14, 2023	Guillermo Prospero Trinidad Stadium, Oranjestad (A)	Aruba	1–3	2023–24 CONCACAF Nations League	Henry		
68	October 17, 2023	Truman Bodden Sports Complex, George Town (A)	Cayman Islands	1–2	2023–24 CONCACAF Nations League	Rak. Joseph		
69	November 16, 2023	Bethlehem Soccer Stadium, Upper Bethlehem (H)	Aruba	1–4	2023–24 CONCACAF Nations League	Farrell		

Notes

1. A: The U.S. Virgin Islands played their home match during qualifying for the 2003 CONCACAF Gold Cup in Santo Domingo, Dominican Republic.
2. B: The U.S. Virgin Islands played their home matches during qualifying for the 2019–20 CONCACAF Nations League in Bradenton, Florida, United States.
3. C: Saint Martin played their home matches during the 2019–20 CONCACAF Nations League in The Valley, Anguilla.
4. D: Match played behind closed doors due to the COVID-19 pandemic in North America.
5. E: Due to the COVID-19 pandemic in North America, Montserrat played their home match against the U.S. Virgin Islands during qualifying for the 2022 FIFA World Cup in San Cristóbal, Dominican Republic.

== Record by opponent ==
As of match played 4 October 2026 after match against Puerto Rico

Team	Pld	W	D	L	GF	GA	GD	WPCT
American Samoa	1	1	0	0	5	2	+3	100.00
Anguilla	3	1	2	0	3	0	+3	33.33
Aruba	2	0	0	2	2	7	−5	0.00
Antigua and Barbuda	4	0	0	4	1	23	−22	0.00
Bahamas	5	2	2	1	10	10	0	40.00
Barbados	7	1	0	6	1	20	−19	14.29
Bermuda	1	0	0	1	0	6	−6	0.00
Bonaire	3	0	0	3	1	6	−5	0.00
British Virgin Islands	8	3	2	3	7	11	−4	37.50
Canada	1	0	0	1	0	8	−8	0.00
Cayman Islands	4	0	1	3	3	7	−4	0.00
Curaçao	4	0	0	4	1	21	−20	0.00
Dominica	1	0	0	1	0	5	−5	0.00
Dominican Republic	3	0	0	3	3	17	−14	0.00
El Salvador	1	0	0	1	0	7	−7	0.00
Grenada	4	0	0	4	2	17	−15	0.00
Guadeloupe	1	0	0	1	0	11	−11	0.00
Guyana	1	0	0	1	0	7	−7	0.00
Haiti	4	0	0	4	1	36	−35	0.00
Jamaica	1	0	0	1	1	11	−10	0.00
Montserrat	2	0	0	2	0	5	−5	0.00
Puerto Rico	1	0	0	1	0	2	−2	0.00
Saint Kitts and Nevis	2	0	0	2	0	11	−11	0.00
Saint Lucia	3	0	0	3	1	25	−24	0.00
Saint Martin	5	2	1	2	5	8	−3	40.00
Saint Vincent and the Grenadines	2	0	0	2	1	14	−13	0.00
Sint Maarten	3	1	1	1	4	4	0	33.33
Turks and Caicos Islands	4	1	2	1	6	6	0	25.00
Total	81	12	11	58	58	307	−249	14.81

Source: Results
