= Curaçao national football team results (2011–2019) =

This article provides details of international football games played by the Curaçao national football team from 2010 to 2019.

== 2011 ==
18 August 2011 Friendly	Dominican Republic	1–0	Curaçao	San Cristóbal, Dominican Republic
		Report		Stadium: Estadio Panamericano; Referee: Sandy Vasquez (Dominican Republic)

21 August 2011 Friendly	Dominican Republic	1–0	Curaçao	San Cristóbal, Dominican Republic
		Report		Stadium: Estadio Panamericano; Referee: Juan Carlos Hidalgo (Dominican Republic)

2 September 2011 2014 FIFA World Cup Q	Antigua and Barbuda	5–2	Curaçao	North Sound, Antigua and Barbuda
		Report		Stadium: Sir Vivian Richards Stadium; Attendance: 2,000; Referee: Javier Sanots Escobar (Puerto Rico)

6 September 2011 2014 FIFA World Cup Q	Curaçao	2–4	Haiti	Willemstad, Curaçao
		Report		Stadium: Stadion Ergilio Hato; Attendance: 5,000; Referee: Jeffrey Solis (Costa Rica)

23 September 2011 Friendly	Suriname	2–0	Curaçao	Paramaribo, Suriname
		Report		Stadium: André Kamperveen Stadion; Referee: Andy Pireau (Suriname)

25 September 2011 Friendly	Suriname	2–2	Curaçao	Paramaribo, Suriname
		Report		Stadium: André Kamperveen Stadion; Referee: Andy Pireau (Suriname)

7 October 2011 2014 FIFA World Cup Q	Curaçao	0–1	Antigua and Barbuda	Willemstad, Curaçao
		Report		Stadium: Stadion Ergilio Hato; Attendance: 2,563; Referee: Oscar Reyna (Guatemala)

11 October 2011 2014 FIFA World Cup Q	Haiti	2–2	Curaçao	Port-au-Prince, Haiti
		Report		Stadium: Stade Sylvio Cator; Attendance: 7,800; Referee: Leon Clarke (Saint Lucia)

11 November 2011 2014 FIFA World Cup Q	U.S. Virgin Islands	0–3	Curaçao	Frederiksted, United States Virgin Islands
		Report		Stadium: Paul E. Joseph Stadium; Attendance: 210; Referee: Mauricio Navarro (Canada)

15 November 2011 2014 FIFA World Cup Q	Curaçao	6–1	U.S. Virgin Islands	Willemstad, Curaçao
		Report		Stadium: Stadion Ergilio Hato; Attendance: 2,000; Referee: Valdrin Legister (Jamaica)

2 December 2011 ABCS Tournament	Curaçao	1–3	Bonaire	Paramaribo, Suriname
		Report		Stadium: Dr. Ir. Franklin Essed Stadion

4 December 2011 ABCS Tournament	Suriname	2–0	Curaçao	Paramaribo, Suriname
		Report		Stadium: Dr. Ir. Franklin Essed Stadion; Referee: Kenneth Brigitha (Curaçao)

== 2012 ==
13 July 2012 ABCS Tournament	Aruba	3–2	Curaçao	Oranjestad, Aruba
21:00	Gilkes 2'; Baten (yellow card) 11'; Raven 44' (yellow card) 44'; Bergen (red card); Rensy (yellow card) 74' (goal) 76'; Abdul (yellow card) 80'	Report	Albertus (yellow card) 12'; J. Martina 70'; Colina 72'; Poppen (yellow card) 84'	Stadium: Guillermo Prospero Trinidad Stadium; Referee: Antonius Pinas (Suriname)

15 July 2012 ABCS Tournament	Bonaire	2–9	Curaçao	Oranjestad, Aruba
		Report		Stadium: Guillermo Prospero Trinidad Stadium

21 October 2012 2012 Caribbean Champ. Q	Saint Lucia	5–1	Curaçao	Gros Islet, Saint Lucia
19:30	Paul 14' (yellow card) 54'; Valcin 44'; Charles 51'; Joseph (yellow card) 77'; Charlemagne 87'; Frederick 90+2'	Report	Delando (yellow card) 34' (yellow-red card) 89'; Isenia 48'	Stadium: Beausejour Stadium; Attendance: 1,650; Referee: Bryan Willett (Antigua and Barbuda)

23 October 2012 2012 Caribbean Champ. Q	Curaçao	1–2	Guyana	Gros Islet, Saint Lucia
	Felomina (yellow card) 49'; Nelson 53' (o.g.); N. Martina (yellow card) 54'; Bartholomeus (yellow card) 75' (yellow-red card) 89'	Report	Mills 1'; Richardson 42' (pen.); Williams (yellow card) 90+1'	Stadium: Beausejour Stadium; Attendance: 750; Referee: Raymond Bogle (Jamaica)

25 October 2012 2012 Caribbean Champ. Q	Saint Vincent and the Grenadines	4–0	Curaçao	Gros Islet, Saint Lucia
	Stewart 8', 76'; Trimmingham (yellow card) 44'; Hamlett 58'; Samuel 78'	Report	Lake (yellow card) 43'; Colina (yellow card) 62'	Stadium: Beausejour Stadium; Attendance: 852; Referee: Sandy Vasquez (Dominican Republic)

== 2013 ==
15 November 2013 ABCS Tournament	Curaçao	2–0	Aruba	Willemstad, Curaçao
20:00	Isenia 14', 31'	Report		Stadium: Ergilio Hato Stadium

16 November 2013 ABCS Tournament	Curaçao	1–3	Suriname	Willemstad, Curaçao
20:00	Leuteria 43'	Report	V. Pinas 3'; Najoe 67', 88'	Stadium: Ergilio Hato Stadium; Referee: Javier Jauregui (Curaçao)

== 2014 ==
3 September 2014 2014 Caribbean Cup Q	Puerto Rico	2–2	Curaçao	Bayamón, Puerto Rico
	Marrero 7', 51'	Report	Rajcomar 59'; Martis 82'	Stadium: Estadio Juan Ramón Loubriel; Referee: John Pitti (Panama)

5 September 2014 2014 Caribbean Cup Q	Curaçao	2–1	Grenada	Bayamón, Puerto Rico
	Rajcomar 57'; Nepomuceno 62'	Report	Rennie 4'	Stadium: Estadio Juan Ramón Loubriel; Referee: Jafeth Perea (Panama)

7 September 2014 2014 Caribbean Cup Q	Curaçao	0–0	French Guiana	Bayamón, Puerto Rico
				Stadium: Estadio Juan Ramón Loubriel; Referee: John Pitti (Panama)

8 October 2014 2014 Caribbean Cup Q	Curaçao	1–1	Martinique	Les Abymes, Guadeloupe
18:00	Merencia 90+2'	Report	Faubert 50'	Stadium: Stade René Serge Nabajoth

10 October 2014 2014 Caribbean Cup Q	Saint Vincent and the Grenadines	1–0	Curaçao	Les Abymes, Guadeloupe
18:00	Anderson 4'			Stadium: Stade René Serge Nabajoth

12 October 2014 2014 Caribbean Cup Q	Guadeloupe	0–1	Curaçao	Les Abymes, Guadeloupe
20:30		Report	Merencia 90+3'	Stadium: Stade René Serge Nabajoth; Referee: Leo Clarke (Saint Lucia)

11 November 2014 2014 Caribbean Cup	Curaçao	2–3	Trinidad and Tobago	Montego Bay, Jamaica
17:30	Meulens 18'; Maria 48'	Report	K. Jones 26' (pen.), 38'; Molino 52'	Stadium: Montego Bay Sports Complex; Referee: Trevor Taylor (Barbados)

13 November 2014 2014 Caribbean Cup	Curaçao	2–3	Cuba	Montego Bay, Jamaica
20:00	Rajcomar 45'; Nepomuceno 69'	Report	Corrales 15'; López 51'; Leiva 90+5'	Stadium: Montego Bay Sports Complex; Referee: Wilson Da Costa (Bahamas)

15 November 2014 2014 Caribbean Cup	French Guiana	4–1	Curaçao	Montego Bay, Jamaica
				Stadium: Montego Bay Sports Complex

== 2015 ==
30 January 2015 ABCS Tournament	Curaçao	0–0 (3–5 p)	Aruba	Paramaribo, Suriname
20:00 UTC−4		Report		Stadium: Essed Stadion; Referee: Johannes Dolaini (Suriname)

1 February 2015 ABCS Tournament	Curaçao	4–1	Bonaire	Paramaribo, Suriname
20:00 UTC−4	Winklaar; Martina	Report	Barzey 85'	Stadium: Essed Stadion; Referee: Ricky de Leca (Aruba)

27 March 2015 2018 World Cup Q	Curaçao	2–1	Montserrat	Willemstad, Curaçao
20:00 UTC−4	Merencia 8'; Zschusschen 39' (pen.)	Report (FIFA); Report (CONCACAF)	Taylor 24'	Stadium: Ergilio Hato Stadium; Referee: Óscar Dávila (Nicaragua)

31 March 2015 2018 World Cup Q	Montserrat	2–2 (3–4 agg.)	Curaçao	Look Out, Montserrat
19:00 UTC−4	Willer 65'; Woods-Garness 81'	Report	Lachman 43'; Vicento 87'	Stadium: Blakes Estate Stadium

20 May 2015 Friendly	Curaçao	3–2	Suriname	Almere, Netherlands
19:00 UTC+1	Merencia; Rajcomar; Wall		Hasselbaink; Snijders	Stadium: Mitsubishi Forklift Stadion

5 June 2015 Friendly	Curaçao	1–0	Trinidad and Tobago	Willemstad, Curaçao
20:00 UTC−4	Vicento 85'	Report		Stadium: Ergilio Hato Stadion

10 June 2015 2018 World Cup Q	Curaçao	0–0	Cuba	Willemstad, Curaçao
20:00 UTC−4		Report		Stadium: Ergilio Hato Stadium

14 June 2015 2018 World Cup Q	Cuba	1–1 (a) (1–1 agg.)	Curaçao	Havana, Cuba
20:00 UTC−4	Márquez 5'; Sánchez (yellow card) 45' (red card)	Report	Merencia 16'; Richard (yellow card) 35'	Stadium: Estadio Pedro Marrero

4 September 2015 2018 World Cup Q	Curaçao	0–1	El Salvador	Willemstad, Curaçao
18:00 (UTC-4)		Report (FIFA); Report (CONCACAF)	Larín 12'	Stadium: Ergilio Hato Stadium; Referee: Valdin Legister (Jamaica)

8 September 2015 2018 World Cup Q	El Salvador	1–0 (2–0 agg.)	Curaçao	San Salvador, El Salvador
	Barrios 9'			Stadium: Estadio Cuscatlán; Referee: Ricardo Montero (Costa Rica)

== 2016 ==
24 March 2016 Caribbean Cup Q	Barbados	1–0	Curaçao	Bridgetown, Barbados
	Harewood 69'	Report		Stadium: Usain Bolt Sports Complex; Referee: Dwight Royal (Jamaica)

26 March 2016 Caribbean Cup Q	Curaçao	2–1	Dominican Republic	Willemstad, Curaçao
	Van Kessel 66'; Zschusschen 81'	Report	Rodríguez 77'	Stadium: Ergilio Hato Stadium; Referee: Dwight Royal (Jamaica)

1 June 2016 Caribbean Cup Q	Guyana	2–5	Curaçao	Willemstad, Curaçao
	Holder 18'; Beresford 78'	Report	Zschusschen 7', 61', 89'; Van Kessel 42', 63'	Stadium: Ergilio Hato Stadium; Referee: Valdin Legister (Jamaica)

4 June 2016 Caribbean Cup Q	Curaçao	7–0	U.S. Virgin Islands	Willemstad, Curaçao
	Van Kessel 2', 24', 50'; Zschusschen 10', 54'; Bacuna 45'; Nepomuceno 70'	Report		Stadium: Ergilio Hato Stadium; Referee: Veralton Nembhard (Jamaica)

5 October 2016 Caribbean Cup Q	Curaçao	3–0	Antigua and Barbuda	Willemstad, Curaçao
	Bacuna 12'; Janga 80'; Van Kessel 90'	Report		Stadium: Ergilio Hato Stadium; Referee: Adrian Skeete (Barbados)

11 October 2016 Caribbean Cup Q	Puerto Rico	2–4 (a.e.t.)	Curaçao	Bayamón, Puerto Rico
	H. Ramos 16'; M. Ramos 27'	Report	Janga 69'; Bacuna 85', 120+1'; Zschusschen 97'	Stadium: Juan Ramón Loubriel Stadium; Referee: Keon Yorke (Trinidad and Tobago)

== 2017 ==
22 March 2017 Friendly	Curaçao	1–1	El Salvador	Willemstad, Curaçao
	Lachman (yellow card) 14'; Bacuna (yellow card) 54'; Zschusschen 74'	Report	Romero (yellow card) 14'; Cerén (yellow card) 55'; Zelaya 90'	Stadium: Stadion dr. Antoine Maduro; Attendance: 2,600; Referee: Ricangel de Leça (Aruba)

13 June 2017 Friendly	Canada	2–1	Curaçao	Montreal, Canada
	James 45'; Jackson-Hamel 87', (yellow card) 89'	Report	Janga 43' de Nooijer (yellow card) 70'	Stadium: Stade Saputo; Attendance: 6,026; Referee: Ted Unkel (United States)

17 June 2017 Friendly	Curaçao	0–0	Nicaragua	Willemstad, Curaçao
		Report		Stadium: Stadion dr. Antoine Maduro

22 June 2017 Caribbean Cup SF	Curaçao	2–1	Martinique	Fort-de-France, Martinique
20:30 AST	Nepomuceno 57' (pen.); Janga 76'	Report	Arquin 17'	Stadium: Stade Pierre-Aliker; Referee: Ricangel de Leça (Aruba)

25 June 2017 Caribbean Cup	Jamaica	1–2	Curaçao	Fort-de-France, Martinique
	Harriott 82'		Hooi 10', 83'	Stadium: Stade Pierre-Aliker; Referee: Michele Rodriguez (Cuba)

9 July 2017 CONCACAF Gold Cup	Curaçao	0–2	Jamaica	San Diego, United States
		Report	Williams 58'; Mattocks 73'	Stadium: Qualcomm Stadium; Referee: Armando Villarreal (United States)

13 July 2017 CONCACAF Gold Cup	El Salvador	2–0	Curaçao	Denver, United States
	Mayen 21'; Zelaya 24'	Report		Stadium: Sports Authority Field; Referee: Héctor Rodríguez (Honduras)

16 July 2017 CONCACAF Gold Cup	Curaçao	0–2	Mexico	San Antonio, United States
19:00 CDT (UTC−5)		Report	Sepúlveda 22'; Álvarez 90+1'	Stadium: Alamodome; Attendance: 44,232; Referee: Kimbell Ward (Saint Kitts and Nevis)

10 October 2017 Friendly	Qatar	1–2	Curaçao	Doha, Qatar
	Al-Haidos 28'	Report	Bacuna 36'; Hooi 70'	Stadium: Jassim Bin Hamad Stadium

12 November 2017 Friendly	Curaçao	Cancelled^{1}	Bolivia	Willemstad, Curaçao
				Stadium: Stadion Ergilio Hato

1. Match cancelled due to the use of the Ergilio Hato Stadium as a makeshift shelter for victims of Hurricane Irma from the island country of Sint Maarten.

== 2018 ==
23 March 2018 Friendly	Curaçao	1–1	Bolivia	Willemstad, Curaçao
17:00 (UTC−4)	van Kessel 33'	Report	Lachman 63' (o.g.)	Stadium: Ergilio Hato Stadium; Attendance: 3,384; Referee: Ricangel de Leça (Aruba)

26 March 2018 Friendly	Curaçao	1–0	Bolivia	Willemstad, Curaçao
16:00 (UTC−4)	Bacuna 59' (pen.)	Report		Stadium: Ergilio Hato Stadium; Attendance: 5,693; Referee: Ricangel de Leça (Aruba)

10 September 2018 CONCACAF Nations League	Curaçao	10–0	Grenada	Willemstad, Curaçao
20:00 (UTC−4)	Hooi 11'; C. Martina 19'; Kuwas 23'; Bacuna 53', 68'; Janga 59', 84', 88'; Nepomuceno 63'; Leuteria 90+1'	Report		Stadium: Ergilio Hato Stadium; Referee: Hugo Cruz (Costa Rica)

12 October 2018 CONCACAF Nations League	U.S. Virgin Islands	0–5	Curaçao	Bradenton, United States
16:00 (UTC−4)		Report	Janga 29'; Nepomuceno 33'; Bacuna 53' (pen.); Greene 55' (o.g.); Martinus 89'	Stadium: IMG Academy; Referee: Jamar Springer (Barbados)

19 November 2018 CONCACAF Nations League	Curaçao	6–0	Guadeloupe	Willemstad, Curaçao
20:00 (UTC−4)	Nepomuceno 39', 61'; Hooi 58', 79'; Janga 77', 90'	Report		Stadium: Ergilio Hato Stadium; Referee: Jaime Herrera (El Salvador)

== 2019 ==
23 March 2019 CONCACAF Nations League	Antigua and Barbuda	2–1	Curaçao	North Sound, Antigua and Barbuda
18:00	Osbourne 1'; Benjamin 49'	Report	Kastaneer 37'	Stadium: Sir Vivian Richards Stadium; Referee: Randy Solano (Dominican Republic)

5 June 2019 King's Cup SF	Curaçao	3–1	India	Buriram, Thailand
4:30 UTC−4	Bonevacia 15'; Hooi 17'; Bacuna 33'	Report	Chhetri 31' (pen.)	Stadium: Chang Arena; Referee: Chaireag Ngamsom (Thailand)

8 June 2019 King's Cup Final	Curaçao	1–1 (5–4 p)	Vietnam	Buriram, Thailand
8:45 UTC−4	Carolina 58'	Report	Phạm Đức Huy 83'	Stadium: Chang Arena; Referee: Wiwat Jumpaoon (Thailand)
	Penalties
	Benschop (penalty scored); Hooi (penalty scored); Antonia (penalty scored); Bacuna (penalty scored); Maria (penalty scored)		(penalty scored) Nguyễn Anh Đức; (penalty missed) Nguyễn Công Phượng; (penalty scored) Nguyễn Trọng Hoàng; (penalty scored) Quế Ngọc Hải; (penalty scored) Đoàn Văn Hậu

17 June 2019 Gold Cup GS	Curaçao	0–1	El Salvador	Kingston, Jamaica
18:00 EST		Report	Bonilla 45+1'	Stadium: Independence Park; Attendance: 17,874; Referee: Walter López (Guatemala)

21 June 2019 Gold Cup GS	Honduras	0–1	Curaçao	Houston, United States
20:30 EST		Report	Bacuna 40'	Stadium: BBVA Stadium; Attendance: 22,395; Referee: Juan Gabriel Calderón (Costa Rica)

25 June 2019 Gold Cup GS	Jamaica	1–1	Curaçao	Los Angeles, United States
20:00 EST	Nicholson 14'	Report	Gaari 90+3'	Stadium: Banc of California Stadium; Attendance: 22,503; Referee: Marco Ortíz (Mexico)

30 June 2019 Gold Cup QF	United States	1–0	Curaçao	Philadelphia, United States
20:30 EST	McKennie 25'	Report		Stadium: Lincoln Financial Field; Attendance: 26,233; Referee: Adonai Escobedo (Mexico)

7 September 2019 Nations League A	Curaçao	1–0	Haiti	Willemstad, Curaçao
18:00	Hooi 70'	Report		Stadium: Ergilio Hato Stadium; Referee: Keylor Herrera (Costa Rica)

10 September 2019 Nations League A	Haiti	1–1	Curaçao	Port-au-Prince, Haiti
18:00	Pierrot 15'	Report	Hooi 41'	Stadium: Stade Sylvio Cator; Referee: Walter López Castellanos (Guatemala)

13 October 2019 Nations League A	Costa Rica	0–0	Curaçao	Alajuela, Costa Rica
20:00		Report		Stadium: Estadio Alejandro Morera Soto; Referee: Armando Villarreal (United States)

14 November 2019 Nations League A	Curaçao	1–2	Costa Rica	Willemstad, Curaçao
18:30	Janga 20'	Report	Venegas 14' (pen.); Calvo 84'	Stadium: Ergilio Hato Stadium; Referee: Marco Ortiz (Mexico)
