= Eloy Room =

Curaçaoan footballer (born 1989)

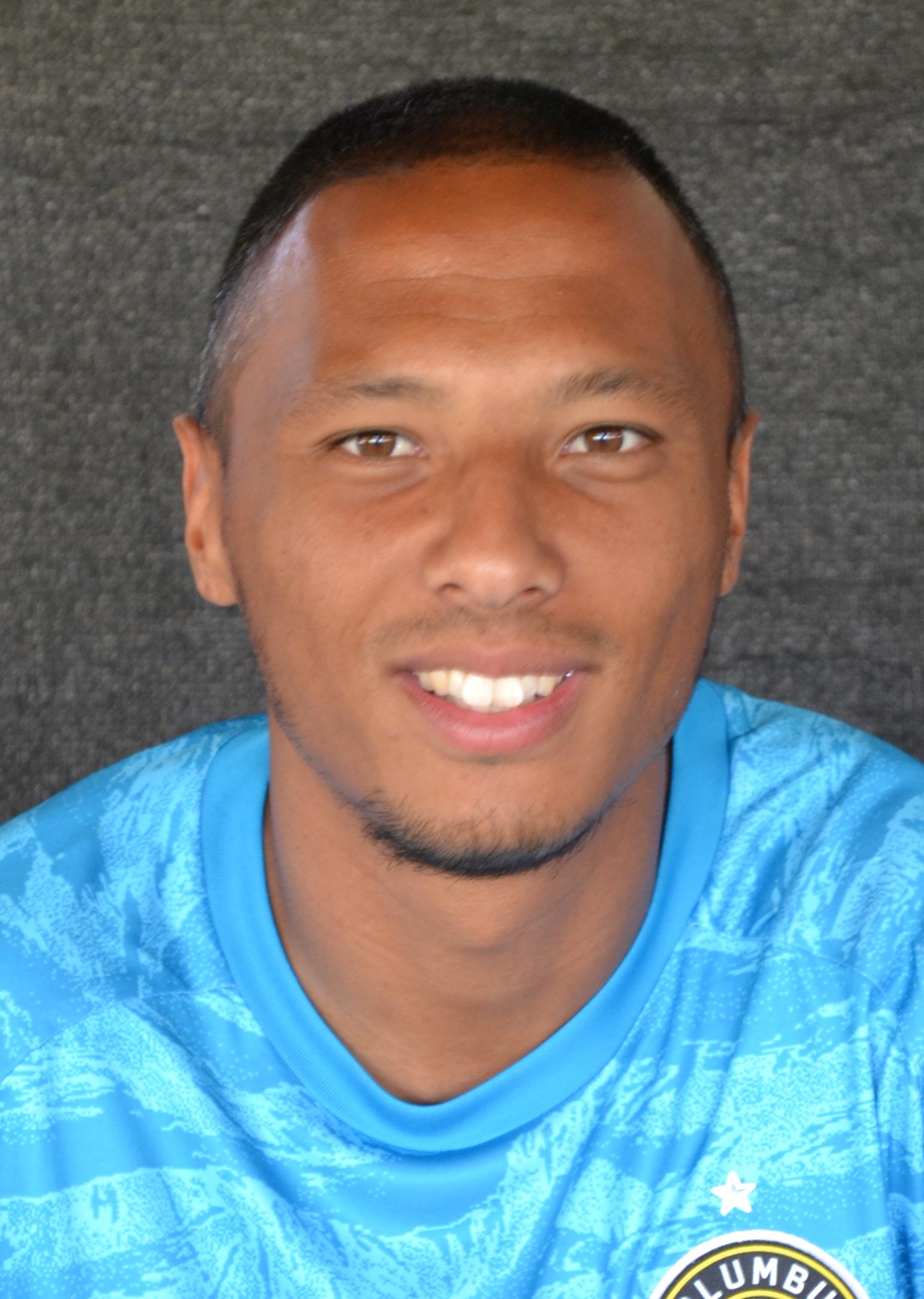
- Room with Columbus Crew in 2019

Personal information
- Full name: Eloy Victor Room
- Date of birth: 6 February 1989 (age 37)
- Place of birth: Nijmegen, Netherlands
- Height: 1.88 m (6 ft 2 in)
- Position: Goalkeeper

Team information
- Current team: Miami FC
- Number: 1

Youth career
- 1996–1998: SCE Nijmegen
- 1998–2001: NEC
- 2001–2002: VV Union
- 2002–2008: Vitesse

Senior career*
Years	Team	Apps	(Gls)
2008–2017	Vitesse	133	(0)
2013–2014	→ Go Ahead Eagles (loan)	20	(0)
2017–2019	PSV	3	(0)
2017–2018	Jong PSV	14	(0)
2019–2023	Columbus Crew	96	(0)
2023–2024	Vitesse	34	(0)
2024–2025	Cercle Brugge	0	(0)
2025–	Miami FC	21	(0)

International career^{‡}
2010	Netherlands U20	1	(0)
2015–	Curaçao	81	(0)
Medal record
Men's football
Representing Curaçao
Caribbean Cup
Winner	2017 Martinique
- * Club domestic league appearances and goals as of 31 October 2026 ‡ National team caps and goals as of 15 November 2026 (UTC)

Eloy Victor Room (born 6 February 1989) is a professional footballer who plays as a goalkeeper for USL Championship club Miami FC. Born in the Netherlands, he plays for the Curaçao national team. He is Curaçao's joint most capped player along with Leandro Bacuna.

== Club career ==
=== Vitesse ===
Room joined Vitesse at age 13, having played for numerous clubs, including SCE Nijmegen, local rivals NEC Nijmegen, and VV Union.

After impressing for the Vitesse youth sides, Room was promoted to the first-team squad for the 2008–09 campaign. On 8 March 2009, Room made his Vitesse debut in a 1–0 defeat against Volendam, replacing the injured Piet Velthuizen in the 13th minute. On 18 April 2009, Room was given his first Vitesse start by manager Theo Bos in a 2–1 victory against AZ. Room made his breakthrough in the Vitesse first-team squad in the 2010–11 campaign, following Velthuizen's departure to Spanish side Hércules, appearing 33 times in the league of a possible 34. However, after only a year, Velthuizen rejoined the Dutch side after struggling to adapt in Spain, displacing Room once again.

On 30 June 2013, Room joined Go Ahead Eagles on a season-long loan to gain first-team football. On 4 August 2013, Room made his Go Ahead Eagles debut in a 1–1 draw with Utrecht. On 29 January 2014, six months later, Room's loan deal at Go Ahead Eagles was cut short by Vitesse, due to an injury to back-up goalkeeper Marko Meerits. Room left Go Ahead Eagles after making 20 league starts and two cup appearances.

Although Room returned to Vitesse, he did not appear for the remainder of the 2013–14 campaign due to Velthuizen's impressive form. In the 2014–15 campaign, Room finally displaced Velthuizen after some disappointing displays. Room appeared in all 34 league fixtures in Vitesse's 2015–16 campaign; he also played the entirety of their KNVB Cup and UEFA Europa League campaigns.

Room played as Vitesse won the final of the KNVB Cup 2–0 against AZ Alkmaar on 30 April 2017 to lead the club to the title for the first time in their 125-year history.

=== PSV ===
On 16 August 2017, Room joined fellow Eredivisie side PSV after a 15-year spell at Vitesse.

He came off the bench on 15 April 2018 as PSV beat rivals Ajax 3–0 to clinch the 2017–18 Eredivisie title.

=== Columbus Crew ===
On 5 July 2019, Room signed with Major League Soccer club Columbus Crew on a free transfer, replacing Zack Steffen who left the club for Manchester City. He made his debut for on 20 July in a 2–1 victory against the Montreal Impact. Room completed his first season with 12 appearances for the Crew, earning one clean sheet.

During the 2020 regular season, Room missed six games due to injury. In his 17 games, he recorded seven clean sheets and a 0.88 goals against average. Room won the MLS Save of the Year for his double save in the Crew's match against Orlando City SC on 4 November, the first Crew player to win the award. During the 2020 MLS Cup Playoffs, Room tested positive for COVID-19 and missed two games.The Crew won both games he was out, and he was cleared for the MLS Cup final and given the start. The Crew won, attaining their first silverware since the 2009 Supporters' Shield. Room ended the 2020 season with eight clean sheets in 19 appearances.

On 3 December 2021, the Crew re-signed Room to a two-year contract extension through the 2023 MLS season with a club option for 2024. Crew president and general manager Tim Bezbatchenko stated, "Eloy has not only performed on the field, but he has also bought into the values of the Crew to become a veteran voice and leader in the locker room."

On 17 July 2023, Room and Columbus mutually agreed to terminate his contract.

=== Later career ===
On 18 July 2023, Room returned to Vitesse on a two-year contract. On 7 August 2024, Room's contract with Vitesse was terminated by mutual consent amidst the club's financial problems.

In October 2024, Room joined Belgian Pro League club Cercle Brugge until the end of the season.

On 12 December 2025, he signed to USL Championship club Miami FC.

== International career ==
Room, who was born in the Netherlands and is a Dutch citizen, is eligible to represent Curaçao through his father. He made his senior debut for the country in a 1–0 win against Trinidad and Tobago on 6 June 2015. He was named man of the match.

In June 2017, Room was confirmed as part of the Curaçao squad for the 2017 CONCACAF Gold Cup. He also represented the country at the 2019 edition. In June 2023, Room was named to the 24-man squad for the 2023 CONCACAF Gold Cup qualification tournament.

He kept a clean sheet against Jamaica on 19 November 2025, securing his side's place in 2026 FIFA World Cup. He was the starter in their World Cup opening match against Germany in 2026 in which Curaçao lost 7–1. In their next encounter against Ecuador, he made 15 saves, a World Cup record for a 90-minute match. The match ended in a 0–0 draw, earning Curaçao's first ever World Cup point. This performance led him to be the first Curaçaoan to become Player of the match in the FIFA World Cup.

== Career statistics ==
=== Club ===
As of match played 7 November 2026

Appearances and goals by club, season and competition
Club	Season	League			National cup (Note: Includes KNVB Cup, Belgian Cup)		Continental (Note: Includes UEFA Europa League, CONCACAF Champions League)		Other (Note: Includes Eredivisie European play-offs, MLS Cup playoffs, MLS is Back Tournament knockout stage and USL Cup)		Total	
Club	Season	Division	Apps	Goals	Apps	Goals	Apps	Goals	Apps	Goals	Apps	Goals
Vitesse	2008–09	Eredivisie	3	0	0	0	–		–		3	0
Vitesse	2009–10	Eredivisie	3	0	0	0	–		–		3	0
Vitesse	2010–11	Eredivisie	33	0	3	0	–		–		36	0
Vitesse	2011–12	Eredivisie	2	0	1	0	–		0	0	3	0
Vitesse	2012–13	Eredivisie	2	0	4	0	0	0	–		6	0
Vitesse	2013–14	Eredivisie	0	0	0	0	0	0	0	0	0	0
Vitesse	2014–15	Eredivisie	23	0	3	0	–		4	0	30	0
Vitesse	2015–16	Eredivisie	34	0	0	0	2	0	–		36	0
Vitesse	2016–17	Eredivisie	33	0	5	0	–		–		38	0
Vitesse	Total		133	0	16	0	2	0	4	0	155	0
Go Ahead Eagles (loan)	2013–14	Eredivisie	20	0	2	0	–		–		22	0
PSV Eindhoven	2017–18	Eredivisie	3	0	0	0	0	0	–		3	0
PSV Eindhoven	2018–19	Eredivisie	0	0	2	0	0	0	0	0	2	0
PSV Eindhoven	Total		3	0	2	0	0	0	0	0	5	0
Jong PSV	2017–18	Eerste Divisie	14	0	–		–		–		14	0
Columbus Crew	2019	MLS	12	0	0	0	–		–		12	0
Columbus Crew	2020	MLS	17 (Note: Includes two appearances in MLS is Back Tournament group stage)	0	–		–		2	0	19	0
Columbus Crew	2021	MLS	30	0	–		4	0	0	0	34	0
Columbus Crew	2022	MLS	34	0	0	0	–		–		34	0
Columbus Crew	2023	MLS	3	0	0	0	0	0	0	0	3	0
Columbus Crew	Total		96	0	0	0	4	0	2	0	102	0
Vitesse	2023–24	Eredivisie	34	0	0	0	–		–		34	0
Cercle Brugge	2024–25	Belgian Pro League	0	0	2	0	0	0	–		2	0
Miami FC	2026	USL Championship	20	0	0	0	–		5 (Note: three appearances in 2026 USL Cup, two appearances in 2026 USL Championship playoffs)	0	24	0
Career total			320	0	22	0	6	0	11	0	358	0

=== International ===
As of match played 4 October 2026

Appearances and goals by national team and year
National team	Year	Apps	Goals
Curaçao	2015	5	0
Curaçao	2016	6	0
Curaçao	2017	9	0
Curaçao	2018	5	0
Curaçao	2019	11	0
Curaçao	2020	0	0
Curaçao	2021	6	0
Curaçao	2022	3	0
Curaçao	2023	3	0
Curaçao	2024	8	0
Curaçao	2025	12	0
Curaçao	2026	12	0
Total		81	0

== Honours ==
=== Player ===
Vitesse

- KNVB Cup: 2016–17

PSV

- Eredivisie: 2017–18

Columbus Crew

- MLS Cup: 2020

Curaçao

- Caribbean Cup: 2017
- King's Cup: 2019

=== Individual ===
- Caribbean Cup Golden Glove: 2017
- MLS Save of the Year: 2020
- Columbus Crew Defensive Player of the Year: 2021, 2022
