= Ayinde =

Àyìndé
- Gender: Male
- Language: Yoruba

Origin
- Origin: Nigerian
- Meaning: We praise as he arrived
- Region of origin: South-West Nigeria

Àyìndé is a Yoruba surname common in Nigeria. It means “we gave praises when he arrived”. Notable people with the name include:

== Notable People who bears the name ==
- Abdoul Ayinde (born 2005), Burkinabe footballer
- Ayinde Augustus, United States Virgin Islands soccer player
- Ayinde Bakare, Nigerian musician
- Ayinde Barrister, Nigerian musician
- Ayinde Eley (born 1998), American football player
- Ayinde Jamiu Lawal, Nigerian footballer
- Ayinde Ubaka, American basketball player
