= Devon Millington =

Guyanese association football player

Personal information
- Full name: Devon Millington
- Date of birth: 11 December 1983 (age 42)
- Place of birth: Guyana
- Position: Forward

Team information
- Current team: Slingerz FC

Senior career*
Years	Team	Apps	(Gls)
2003–2004	Georgetown FC		
2005–2009	Western Tigers		
2010–2014	Alpha United		
2015–	Slingerz FC		

International career^{‡}
2008–	Guyana	25	(5)
- * Club domestic league appearances and goals as of 10:55, 24 May 2016 (UTC) ‡ National team caps and goals as of 20 February 2017

Devon Millington (born 11 December 1983) is a Guyanese semi-professional footballer who plays as a midfielder for Slingerz FC and the Guyana national team.

== Career ==
=== Club career ===
Millington began his career with Georgetown FC, where he spent two seasons. In 2005, he joined Western Tigers, but in his fifth season with the club saw them relegated to the second tier. He then joined Alpha United in 2010, and in four seasons stormed to success in the Guyana Super League on four separate occasions. Millington moved to Slingerz FC in 2015.

=== International career ===
Millington made his international debut for Guyana on 8 August 2008, playing in a 3–0 win over Dominica in the 2008 Caribbean Championships. He made a further two appearances in the competition, but failed to make the scoresheet.

He scored his first international goal on 28 October 2009, scoring the only goal in a 1–0 win against Suriname in the Suriname Independence Cup. His second goal came just two days later, scoring in a 1–0 victory over Netherlands Antilles in the same competition. Millington scored twice during the 2010 Caribbean Cup, against Suriname and Saint Vincent and the Grenadines.

=== International goals ===
Scores and results list Guyana's goal tally first.

No	Date	Venue	Opponent	Score	Result	Competition
1.	28 October 2009	André Kamperveen Stadion, Paramaribo, Suriname	Suriname	1–0	1–0	Suriname Independence Cup
2.	30 October 2009	André Kamperveen Stadion, Paramaribo, Suriname	Netherlands Antilles	1–0	1–0	Suriname Independence Cup
3.	17 October 2010	André Kamperveen Stadion, Paramaribo, Suriname	Suriname	2–0	2–0	2010 Caribbean Cup qualification
4.	6 November 2010	Manny Ramjohn Stadium, Marabella, Trinidad and Tobago	Saint Vincent and the Grenadines	1–0	2–0	2010 Caribbean Cup qualification
5.	4 June 2016	Addelita Cancryn Junior High School Ground, Charlotte Amalie, U.S. Virgin Islands	U.S. Virgin Islands	3–0	7–0	2017 Caribbean Cup qualification

== Personal life ==
In November 2010, Millington's mother suggested he was being victimised by the Guyana Football Federation. The forward was not included in the squad to play English side Cray Wanderers or Guatemala in the United States, sparking her claims.
