= 2017 Caribbean Cup qualification =

Tournament details
- Dates: 22 March 2016 – 8 January 2017
- Teams: 25 (from 1 sub-confederation)

Tournament statistics
- Matches played: 50
- Goals scored: 179 (3.58 per match)
- Top scorer(s): (Curaçao) Gino van Kessel (Curaçao) Felitciano Zschusschen (7 goals each)

The 2017 Caribbean Cup qualification began in March 2016. The qualification competition determined which Caribbean national teams would play in the 2017 Caribbean Cup and the 2017 CONCACAF Gold Cup.

== Participants ==
25 teams from the 31 CFU members entered the qualification tournament. Sint Maarten participated for the first time since 1997.

Seeding	Teams	No. of teams
No participation	Bahamas; Bonaire; Cayman Islands; Montserrat; Saint Lucia; Turks and Caicos Islands	6
First round entrants	Anguilla; Antigua and Barbuda; Aruba; Barbados; Bermuda; British Virgin Islands; Cuba; Curaçao; Dominica; Dominican Republic; French Guiana; Grenada; Guadeloupe; Guyana; Martinique; Puerto Rico; Saint Kitts and Nevis; Saint Martin (Withdrew later); Sint Maarten; Suriname; U.S. Virgin Islands	21
Second round entrants	Saint Vincent and the Grenadines	1
Third round entrants	Haiti; Jamaica; Trinidad and Tobago	3

== Draw ==
Twenty five nations were involved in the draw, which took place on 16 January 2016, 21:00 AST (UTC−4), at the Jolly Beach Resort & Spa resort in St. John's, Antigua and Barbuda. Four teams were given a bye due to their involvement in the 2018 FIFA World Cup qualification – CONCACAF fourth round. The draw was conducted by Sonia Bien-Aime, Kirsy Rijo Charles Kullman, Chet Green and Lance Whittaker. The CFU used their own rankings to determine which teams would be given seeds based on their previous performances in the competition.

CFU Caribbean Cup Ranking
Rank	Country	2014	2012	2010	2008	2007	Total
1	Jamaica	10	3	10	10	1	34
2	Cuba	4	10	6	4	6	30
3	Trinidad and Tobago	8	8	3	3	8	30
4	Haiti	6	6	2	3	10	27
5	Guadeloupe	2	2	8	6	4	22
6	Grenada	1	2	4	8	1	16
7	Martinique	3	4	3	2	3	15
8	Antigua and Barbuda	3	3	3	3	2	14
9	Guyana	1	2	3	2	3	11
10	Saint Vincent and the Grenadines	2	2	2	1	3	10
11	Barbados	2	1	1	3	3	10
12	Suriname	1	2	2	2	2	9
13	Dominican Republic	2	3	2	0	2	9
14	Saint Kitts and Nevis	2	1	2	2	1	8
15	Curaçao	3	1	1	2	1	8
16	Dominica	1	1	2	1	1	6
17	French Guiana	3	3	0	0	0	6
18	Puerto Rico	1	2	2	0	0	5
19	Saint Lucia	2	1	1	0	1	5
20	Anguilla	1	1	1	1	1	5
21	British Virgin Islands	1	1	1	1	1	5
22	Saint Martin	0	1	1	1	1	4
23	Bermuda	0	1	0	1	2	4
24	Cayman Islands	0	0	2	1	1	4
25	Aruba	1	1	0	1	0	3
26	Montserrat	1	1	1	0	0	3
27	Turks and Caicos Islands	1	0	0	0	1	2
28	Bahamas	0	0	0	0	2	2
29	U.S. Virgin Islands	1	0	0	0	0	1
30	Bonaire	1	0	0	0	0	1
31	Sint Maarten	0	0	0	0	0	0
Points calculation and Key
Champion - 10 pts; 2nd Place - 8 pts; 3rd Place - 6 pts; 4th Place - 4 pts; 5th through to 8th place - 3 pts; Second Round Appearance - 2 pts; Participation (without reaching any of the above stages) - 1 pt				Received bye Seeded Non-participant			

== Match schedule ==
Round	Date
First round	22–29 March 2016
Second round	1–7 June 2016
Third round	5–11 October 2016
Fifth place play-off	4–8 January 2017

Notes

- The second round was originally scheduled for 15–21 May 2016 which is not on the FIFA Calendar.
- The fifth place play-off was originally scheduled for 9–15 November 2016. However, three third round matches were postponed to 9–13 November 2016 due to Hurricane Matthew-related reasons. The fifth place play-off was rescheduled to be 4–8 January 2017, and also played in a single venue in Trinidad and Tobago instead of each team hosting one match.

== Format ==
In each three-team group, each team plays one home match against one opponent, and an away match against another opponent. If any team withdraws, the remaining two teams play each other, with one home match and one away match.

Should the score remain level after regular playing time, extra time will be played and should the score still be level after extra time has been played, a penalty shoot-out will take place to determine the match winners. This rule was introduced to reduce the chance of a team's fate being decided by a drawing of lots.

=== Tiebreakers ===
The teams are ranked according to points (3 points for a win in regulation, extra time or penalties, 0 points for a loss). If tied on points, tiebreakers are applied in the following order:

1. Goal difference;
2. Goals scored;
3. Away goals scored;
4. Drawing of lots.

== First round ==
21 teams competed in the first round:

- 21 teams entered during this round.

=== Group 1 ===
Pos	Team	Pld	W	W+	L	GF	GA	GD	Pts	Qualification
1	Saint Kitts and Nevis	2	2	0	0	3	0	+3	6	Qualification to Second round
2	Antigua and Barbuda	2	1	0	1	2	2	0	3	Qualification to Second round
3	Aruba	2	0	0	2	1	4	−3	0	

Source: CONCACAF
23 March 2016
19:30 UTC−4

Antigua and Barbuda	2–1	Aruba
Parker 4'; George 23'	Report	Gomez 28'

Sir Vivian Richards Stadium, St. John's
Referee: Wilson Da Costa (Bahamas)

26 March 2016
20:00 UTC−4

Aruba	0–2	Saint Kitts and Nevis
	Report	Panayiotou 39'; Sawyers 45'

Trinidad Stadium, Oranjestad
Referee: Leo Clarke (Saint Lucia)

29 March 2016
20:00 UTC−4

Saint Kitts and Nevis	1–0	Antigua and Barbuda
Panayiotou 65'	Report

Warner Park Sporting Complex, Basseterre
Referee: Sherwin Moore (Guyana)

=== Group 2 ===
Pos	Team	Pld	W	W+	L	GF	GA	GD	Pts	Qualification
1	Grenada	2	2	0	0	7	1	+6	6	Qualification to Second round
2	U.S. Virgin Islands	2	1	0	1	3	3	0	3	Qualification to Second round
3	Sint Maarten	2	0	0	2	1	7	−6	0	

Source: CONCACAF
22 March 2016
19:30 UTC−4

Grenada	5–0	Sint Maarten
J. Rennie 52' (pen.); Charles 54'; De Punder 56' (o.g.); John-Brown 67'; S. Rennie 88'	Report

Grenada National Stadium, St. George's
Referee: Adrian Skeete (Barbados)

26 March 2016
20:00 UTC−4

Sint Maarten	1–2	U.S. Virgin Islands
Boelijn 89'	Report	Herring 24'; Wrensford 76'

Raoul Illidge Sports Complex, Philipsburg
Referee: Sherwin Johnson (Guyana)

29 March 2016
16:15 UTC−4

U.S. Virgin Islands	1–2	Grenada
Wrensford 68'	Report	S. Rennie 15'; Sampson 90+1'

Addelita Cancryn Junior High School Ground, Charlotte Amalie
Referee: Walner Laventure (Haiti)

=== Group 3 ===
Pos	Team	Pld	W	W+	L	GF	GA	GD	Pts	Qualification
1	French Guiana	2	1	0	1	4	2	+2	3	Qualification to Second round
2	Bermuda	2	1	0	1	3	3	0	3	Qualification to Second round
3	Cuba	2	1	0	1	2	4	−2	3	

Source: CONCACAF
22 March 2016
15:30 UTC−4

Cuba	2–1	Bermuda
Gómez 29'; Luis 77'	Report	Smith 90+1'

Estadio Pedro Marrero, Havana
Referee: Karl Tyrell (Jamaica)

26 March 2016
20:00 UTC−3

Bermuda	2–1	French Guiana
T. Ming 43'; Lambe 77'	Report	Evens 37'

Bermuda National Stadium, Devonshire
Referee: Trevor Taylor (Barbados)

29 March 2016
19:30 UTC−3

French Guiana	3–0	Cuba
Lu. Baal 24'; Eric 44'; Contout 63'	Report

Stade Municipal Dr. Edmard Lama, Remire-Montjoly
Referee: Adrian Skeete (Barbados)

=== Group 4 ===
Pos	Team	Pld	W	W+	L	GF	GA	GD	Pts	Qualification
1	Dominican Republic	2	1	0	1	3	2	+1	3	Qualification to Second round
2	Curaçao	2	1	0	1	2	2	0	3	Qualification to Second round
3	Barbados	2	1	0	1	1	2	−1	3	

Source: CONCACAF
23 March 2016
20:00 UTC−4

Barbados	1–0	Curaçao
Harewood 69'	Report

Usain Bolt Sports Complex, Bridgetown
Referee: Dwight Royal (Jamaica)

26 March 2016
20:00 UTC−4

Curaçao	2–1	Dominican Republic
Van Kessel 66'; Zschusschen 81'	Report	Rodríguez 77'

Ergilio Hato Stadium, Willemstad
Referee: Dwight Royal (Jamaica)

29 March 2016
16:00 UTC−4

Dominican Republic	2–0	Barbados
Batista 50', 57'	Report

Estadio Olímpico Félix Sánchez, Santo Domingo
Referee: Bryan Willett (Antigua and Barbuda)

=== Group 5 ===
Pos	Team	Pld	W	W+	L	GF	GA	GD	Pts	Qualification
1	Guyana	2	2	0	0	8	0	+8	6	Qualification to Second round
2	Puerto Rico	2	1	0	1	4	1	+3	3	Qualification to Second round
3	Anguilla	2	0	0	2	0	11	−11	0	

Source: CONCACAF
22 March 2016
19:00 UTC−4

Guyana	7–0	Anguilla
Peters 11', 30'; Nurse 14'; Danns 34'; Richardson 45'; Mills 47'; Barrington 65'	Report

Providence Stadium, Providence
Referee: Sandy Vásquez (Dominican Republic)

26 March 2016
17:00 UTC−4

Anguilla	0–4	Puerto Rico
	Report	Coca 16', 53'; Rivera 42'; Ortiz 63'

Raymond E. Guishard Technical Centre, The Valley
Referee: Moeth Gaymes (Saint Vincent and the Grenadines)

29 March 2016
19:05 UTC−4

Puerto Rico	0–1	Guyana
	Report	Austin 65'

Juan Ramón Loubriel Stadium, Bayamón
Referee: Rodphin Harris (Trinidad and Tobago)

=== Group 6 ===
Pos	Team	Pld	W	W+	L	GF	GA	GD	Pts	Qualification
1	Suriname	2	1	0	1	3	2	+1	3	Qualification to Second round
2	Guadeloupe	2	0	1	1	2	3	−1	3	Qualification to Second round
3	Saint Martin	0	0	0	0	0	0	0	0	Withdrew

Source: CONCACAF
23 March 2016
20:00 UTC−4

Guadeloupe	0–0 (a.e.t.)	Suriname
	Report
Penalties
Milon (penalty scored); Beauvue (penalty scored); Alphonse (penalty missed); Laurence (penalty scored); Babel (penalty missed)	3–2	(penalty scored) Rijssel; (penalty missed) Baja; (penalty missed) Talea; (penalty scored) Eind; (penalty missed) Kohinor

Stade René Serge Nabajoth, Les Abymes
Referee: Adzer Ariznat (Haiti)

29 March 2016
16:30 UTC−3

Suriname	3–2	Guadeloupe
Rijssel 30', 36'; Kisoor 41'	Report	Beauvue 15'; Nabab 32'

André Kamperveen Stadion, Paramaribo
Referee: Wilson Da Costa (Bahamas)

=== Group 7 ===
Pos	Team	Pld	W	W+	L	GF	GA	GD	Pts	Qualification
1	Martinique	2	2	0	0	7	1	+6	6	Qualification to Second round
2	Dominica	2	1	0	1	8	4	+4	3	Qualification to Second round
3	British Virgin Islands	2	0	0	2	0	10	−10	0	

Source: CONCACAF
23 March 2016
20:00 UTC−4

Martinique	3–0	British Virgin Islands
Parsemain 12'; Arquin 68'; Langil 84'	Report

Stade Pierre-Aliker, Fort-de-France
Referee: Michael van der Sande (Curaçao)

26 March 2016
16:00 UTC−4

British Virgin Islands	0–7	Dominica
	Report	Dicker 20' (o.g.); Walters 28', 51'; Bertrand 33'; Wade 44', 55', 85' (pen.)

A. O. Shirley Recreation Ground, Road Town
Referee: Gianni Ascani (Turks and Caicos Islands)

29 March 2016
19:00 UTC−4

Dominica	1–4	Martinique
Bertrand 74' (pen.)	Report	Joseph 11' (o.g.); Hérelle 23'; Arquin 53'; Abaul 88'

Windsor Park, Roseau
Referee: Swason Owen (Cayman Islands)

=== Qualified teams for second round ===
14 teams from the first round (seven group winners and seven group runners-up) qualified for the second round.

==== Group winners ====
Pos	Grp	Team	Pld	W	W+	L	GF	GA	GD	Pts	Qualification
1	5	Guyana	2	2	0	0	8	0	+8	6	Qualification to Second round Group 3
2	7	Martinique	2	2	0	0	7	1	+6	6 (Note: Martinique are ranked ahead of Grenada in away goals scored.)	Qualification to Second round Group 2
3	2	Grenada	2	2	0	0	7	1	+6	6	Qualification to Second round Group 1
4	1	Saint Kitts and Nevis	2	2	0	0	3	0	+3	6	Qualification to Second round Group 5
5	3	French Guiana	2	1	0	1	4	2	+2	3	Qualification to Second round Group 4
6	4	Dominican Republic	2	1	0	1	3	2	+1	3 (Note: Dominican Republic are ranked ahead of Suriname in away goals scored.)	Qualification to Second round Group 4
7	6	Suriname	2	1	0	1	3	2	+1	3	Qualification to Second round Group 5

Source: CONCACAF

==== Group runners-up ====
Pos	Grp	Team	Pld	W	W+	L	GF	GA	GD	Pts	Qualification
1	7	Dominica	2	1	0	1	8	4	+4	3	Qualification to Second round Group 2
2	5	Puerto Rico	2	1	0	1	4	1	+3	3	Qualification to Second round Group 1
3	2	U.S. Virgin Islands	2	1	0	1	3	3	0	3 (Note: U.S. Virgin Islands are ranked ahead of Bermuda in away goals scored.)	Qualification to Second round Group 3
4	3	Bermuda	2	1	0	1	3	3	0	3	Qualification to Second round Group 4
5	4	Curaçao	2	1	0	1	2	2	0	3 (Note: Curaçao and Antigua and Barbuda and are tied in first round record. Positions determined by drawing of lots.)	Qualification to Second round Group 3
6	1	Antigua and Barbuda	2	1	0	1	2	2	0	3	Qualification to Second round Group 1
7	6	Guadeloupe	2	0	1	1	2	3	−1	3	Qualification to Second round Group 2

Source: CONCACAF

== Second round ==
A total of 15 teams competed in the second round:

- Saint Vincent and the Grenadines received a bye to this round.
- 14 teams qualified from the first round.

=== Group 1 ===
Pos	Team	Pld	W	W+	L	GF	GA	GD	Pts	Qualification
1	Puerto Rico	2	0	2	0	5	4	+1	6	Qualification to Third round
2	Antigua and Barbuda	2	1	0	1	6	3	+3	3	Qualification to Third round
3	Grenada	2	0	0	2	4	8	−4	0	

Source: CONCACAF
1 June 2016
20:00 UTC−4

Grenada	3–3 (a.e.t.)	Puerto Rico
John-Brown 3', 27'; M. Phillip 38'	Report	H. Ramos 44' (pen.), 62'; Ortiz 88'
Penalties
J. Rennie (penalty scored); George (penalty scored); Andall (penalty scored); A. Phillip (penalty missed); Charles (penalty missed)	3–4	(penalty scored) H. Ramos; (penalty scored) Rivera; (penalty scored) Sánchez; (penalty scored) Ortiz

Grenada National Stadium, St. George's
Referee: Wilson Da Costa (Bahamas)

4 June 2016
19:30 UTC−4

Puerto Rico	2–1 (a.e.t.)	Antigua and Barbuda
H. Ramos 6', 115'	Report	Blackstock 35'

Juan Ramón Loubriel Stadium, Bayamón
Referee: Sandy Vásquez (Dominican Republic)

7 June 2016
19:30 UTC−4

Antigua and Barbuda	5–1	Grenada
Byers 51'; Jahraldo-Martin 61', 83'; Murtagh 76'; Harriette 77'	Report	Charles 73'

Sir Vivian Richards Stadium, St. John's
Referee: Rodphin Harris (Trinidad and Tobago)

=== Group 2 ===
Pos	Team	Pld	W	W+	L	GF	GA	GD	Pts	Qualification
1	Martinique	2	2	0	0	6	0	+6	6	Qualification to Third round
2	Guadeloupe	2	1	0	1	2	3	−1	3	
3	Dominica	2	0	0	2	1	6	−5	0	

Source: CONCACAF
1 June 2016
20:00 UTC−4

Martinique	2–0	Guadeloupe
Jean-Baptiste 67'; Babin 79'	Report

Stade Pierre-Aliker, Fort-de-France
Referee: Adrian Skeete (Barbados)

4 June 2016
20:00 UTC−4

Guadeloupe	2–1	Dominica
Anatol 23'; Dan 64'	Report	Wade 41'

Stade René Serge Nabajoth, Les Abymes
Referee: Michael van der Sande (Curaçao)

7 June 2016
19:00 UTC−4

Dominica	0–4	Martinique
	Report	Audel 6'; Delem 47'; Grougi 58'; Langil 69'

Windsor Park, Roseau
Referee: Sherwin Moore (Guyana)

=== Group 3 ===
Pos	Team	Pld	W	W+	L	GF	GA	GD	Pts	Qualification
1	Curaçao	2	2	0	0	12	2	+10	6	Qualification to Third round
2	Guyana	2	1	0	1	9	5	+4	3	Qualification to Third round
3	U.S. Virgin Islands	2	0	0	2	0	14	−14	0	

Source: CONCACAF
1 June 2016
20:00 UTC−4

Guyana	2–5	Curaçao
Holder 18'; Beresford 78'	Report	Zschusschen 7', 61', 89'; Van Kessel 42', 63'

Ergilio Hato Stadium, Willemstad (Curaçao) (Note: Guyana vs. Curaçao was originally scheduled to take place at Providence Stadium, Providence in Guyana.)
Referee: Valdin Legister (Jamaica)

4 June 2016 (Note: U.S. Virgin islands vs. Guyana was originally scheduled to take place on 7 June 2016.)
16:15 UTC−4

U.S. Virgin Islands	0–7	Guyana
	Report	Bobb 23', 74'; Shakes 25', 44'; Millington 30'; Abrams 68', 87'

Addelita Cancryn Junior High School Ground, Charlotte Amalie
Referee: William Anderson (Puerto Rico)

7 June 2016 (Note: Curaçao vs. U.S. Virgin islands was originally scheduled to take place on 4 June 2016.)
20:00 UTC−4

Curaçao	7–0	U.S. Virgin Islands
Van Kessel 2', 24', 50'; Zschusschen 10', 54'; Bacuna 45'; Nepomuceno 70'	Report

Ergilio Hato Stadium, Willemstad
Referee: Veralton Nembhard (Jamaica)

=== Group 4 ===
Pos	Team	Pld	W	W+	L	GF	GA	GD	Pts	Qualification
1	Dominican Republic	2	2	0	0	3	1	+2	6	Qualification to Third round
2	French Guiana	2	1	0	1	4	2	+2	3	Qualification to Third round
3	Bermuda	2	0	0	2	0	4	−4	0	

Source: CONCACAF
4 June 2016
21:00 UTC−3

Bermuda	0–1	Dominican Republic
	Report	Faña 27'

Bermuda National Stadium, Devonshire
Referee: Kevin Morrison (Jamaica)

7 June 2016
16:00 UTC−4

Dominican Republic	2–1	French Guiana
Faña 47', 53'	Report	Evens 22'

Estadio Olímpico Félix Sánchez, Santo Domingo
Referee: Michel Rodríguez (Cuba)

19 June 2016 (Note: French Guiana vs. Bermuda originally took place on 1 June 2016, 20:00 UTC−3, at Stade Municipal Dr. Edmard Lama, Remire-Montjoly. but the match was abandoned with 50 minutes left due to waterlogged pitch, with Bermuda leading 1–0 at the time after an 11th-minute goal from Damon Ming. The match was replayed for its entirety 18 days later.)
19:00 UTC−3

French Guiana	3–0	Bermuda
Rimane 64'; Abelinti 80'; Contout 82'	Report

Stade Municipal Dr. Edmard Lama, Remire-Montjoly
Referee: Kimbell Ward (Saint Kitts and Nevis)

=== Group 5 ===
Pos	Team	Pld	W	W+	L	GF	GA	GD	Pts	Qualification
1	Saint Kitts and Nevis	2	2	0	0	2	0	+2	6	Qualification to Third round
2	Suriname	2	1	0	1	2	2	0	3	Qualification to Third round
3	Saint Vincent and the Grenadines	2	0	0	2	1	3	−2	0	

Source: CONCACAF
1 June 2016
20:00 UTC−4

Saint Kitts and Nevis	1–0	Suriname
Panayiotou 30'	Report

Warner Park Sporting Complex, Basseterre
Referee: Bryan Willett (Antigua and Barbuda)

4 June 2016
16:00 UTC−3

Suriname	2–1	Saint Vincent and the Grenadines
Kisoor 85'; Valies 90+4'	Report	Samuel 71'

André Kamperveen Stadion, Paramaribo
Referee: Karl Tyrell (Jamaica)

7 June 2016
17:30 UTC−4

Saint Vincent and the Grenadines	0–1	Saint Kitts and Nevis
	Report	Blanchette 6'

Arnos Vale Stadium, Kingstown
Referee: Walner Laventure (Haiti)

=== Qualified teams for third round ===
9 teams from the second round (five group winners and best four group runners-up) qualified.

==== Group winners ====
Pos	Grp	Team	Pld	W	W+	L	GF	GA	GD	Pts	Qualification
1	3	Curaçao	2	2	0	0	12	2	+10	6	Qualification to Third round Group 3
2	2	Martinique	2	2	0	0	6	0	+6	6	Qualification to Third round Group 4
3	4	Dominican Republic	2	2	0	0	3	1	+2	6	Qualification to Third round Group 4
4	5	Saint Kitts and Nevis	2	2	0	0	2	0	+2	6	Qualification to Third round Group 2
5	1	Puerto Rico	2	0	2	0	5	4	+1	6	Qualification to Third round Group 3

Source: CONCACAF

==== Group runners-up ====
Pos	Grp	Team	Pld	W	W+	L	GF	GA	GD	Pts	Qualification
1	3	Guyana	2	1	0	1	9	5	+4	3	Qualification to Third round Group 1
2	1	Antigua and Barbuda	2	1	0	1	6	3	+3	3	Qualification to Third round Group 3
3	4	French Guiana	2	1	0	1	4	2	+2	3	Qualification to Third round Group 2
4	5	Suriname	2	1	0	1	2	2	0	3	Qualification to Third round Group 1
5	2	Guadeloupe	2	1	0	1	2	3	−1	3	

Source: CONCACAF

== Third round ==
A total of 12 teams competed in the third round:

- Haiti, Jamaica and Trinidad and Tobago received a bye to this round.
- 9 teams qualified from the second round.

=== Group 1 ===
Pos	Team	Pld	W	W+	L	GF	GA	GD	Pts	Qualification
1	Jamaica	2	1	1	0	5	2	+3	6	Qualification to 2017 Caribbean Cup and 2017 CONCACAF Gold Cup
2	Suriname	2	0	1	1	3	3	0	3	Qualification to Fifth place play-off
3	Guyana	2	0	0	2	4	7	−3	0	

Source: CONCACAF
8 October 2016
16:30 UTC−3

Suriname	3–2 (a.e.t.)	Guyana
Kisoor 58'; Talea 103'; Rozenblad 110'	Report	Barrington 4'; McKenzie-Lyle 120'

André Kamperveen Stadion, Paramaribo
Referee: Dwight Royal (Jamaica)

11 October 2016
20:00 UTC−4

Guyana	2–4 (a.e.t.)	Jamaica
Butters 7', 30'	Report	Watson 63'; Williams 88'; Francis 116'; Burke 120'

Leonora Stadium, Leonora
Referee: Kerry Skepple (Antigua and Barbuda)

13 November 2016 (Note: The Jamaica v Suriname match, originally scheduled on 5 October 2016, 20:00 UTC−5, was rescheduled due to safety concerns regarding Hurricane Matthew.)
20:00 UTC−5

Jamaica	1–0	Suriname
Burke 16'	Report

Anthony Spaulding Sports Complex, Kingston
Referee: Wilson Da Costa (Bahamas)

=== Group 2 ===
Pos	Team	Pld	W	W+	L	GF	GA	GD	Pts	
1	French Guiana	2	2	0	0	6	2	+4	6	Qualification to 2017 Caribbean Cup and 2017 CONCACAF Gold Cup
2	Haiti	2	0	1	1	4	5	−1	3	Qualification to Fifth place play-off
3	Saint Kitts and Nevis	2	0	0	2	0	3	−3	0	

Source: CONCACAF
8 October 2016
20:00 UTC−3

French Guiana	1–0	Saint Kitts and Nevis
Abelinti 63'	Report

Stade Municipal Dr. Edmard Lama, Remire-Montjoly
Referee: Javier Santos (Puerto Rico)

9 November 2016 (Note: The Haiti v French Guiana match, originally scheduled on 5 October 2016, 20:00 UTC−5, was rescheduled due to the impact of Hurricane Matthew.)
20:00 UTC−5

Haiti	2–5	French Guiana
M. Jérôme 4' (pen.); Nazon 27'	Report	Privat 38', 58', 64' (pen.); Evens 67'; Lu. Baal 90+1'

Stade Sylvio Cator, Port-au-Prince
Referee: Sandy Vásquez (Dominican Republic)

13 November 2016 (Note: The Saint Kitts and Nevis v Haiti match, originally scheduled on 11 October 2016, 20:00 UTC−4, was rescheduled due to the impact of Hurricane Matthew.)
20:00 UTC−4

Saint Kitts and Nevis	0–2 (a.e.t.)	Haiti
	Report	Guerrier 102'; Nazon 119'

Warner Park Sporting Complex, Basseterre
Referee: Johannes Dolaini (Suriname)

=== Group 3 ===
Pos	Team	Pld	W	W+	L	GF	GA	GD	Pts	Qualification
1	Curaçao	2	1	1	0	7	2	+5	6	Qualification to 2017 Caribbean Cup and 2017 CONCACAF Gold Cup
2	Antigua and Barbuda	2	1	0	1	2	3	−1	3	
3	Puerto Rico	2	0	0	2	2	6	−4	0	

Source: CONCACAF
5 October 2016
20:00 UTC−4

Curaçao	3–0	Antigua and Barbuda
Bacuna 12'; Janga 80'; Van Kessel 90'	Report

Ergilio Hato Stadium, Willemstad
Referee: Adrian Skeete (Barbados)

8 October 2016
19:15 UTC−4

Antigua and Barbuda	2–0	Puerto Rico
Byers 43'; Smith 86'	Report

Antigua Recreation Ground, St. John's
Referee: Sherwin Moore (Guyana)

11 October 2016
19:30 UTC−4

Puerto Rico	2–4 (a.e.t.)	Curaçao
H. Ramos 16'; M. Ramos 27'	Report	Janga 69'; Bacuna 85', 120+1'; Zschusschen 97'

Juan Ramón Loubriel Stadium, Bayamón
Referee: Keon Yorke (Trinidad and Tobago)

=== Group 4 ===
Pos	Team	Pld	W	W+	L	GF	GA	GD	Pts	Qualification
1	Martinique	2	1	1	0	4	1	+3	6	Qualification to 2017 Caribbean Cup and 2017 CONCACAF Gold Cup
2	Trinidad and Tobago	2	1	0	1	4	2	+2	3	Qualification to Fifth place play-off
3	Dominican Republic	2	0	0	2	1	6	−5	0	

Source: CONCACAF
5 October 2016
19:00 UTC−4

Trinidad and Tobago	4–0	Dominican Republic
Molino 14', 18', 55'; Cato 30'	Report

Ato Boldon Stadium, Couva
Referee: Kimbell Ward (Saint Kitts and Nevis)

8 October 2016
16:00 UTC−4

Dominican Republic	1–2	Martinique
Beard 75'	Report	Langil 14'; Coureur 89'

Estadio Panamericano, San Cristóbal
Referee: Yadel Martínez (Cuba)

11 October 2016
20:00 UTC−4

Martinique	2–0 (a.e.t.)	Trinidad and Tobago
Parsemain 105'; Langil 120'	Report

Stade Pierre-Aliker, Fort-de-France
Referee: Valdin Legister (Jamaica)

=== Qualified teams for Caribbean Cup and CONCACAF Gold Cup ===
4 teams from the third round (four group winners) qualified for the 2017 Caribbean Cup and the 2017 CONCACAF Gold Cup.

Group	Team	Qualified on	Previous Caribbean Cup qualifications	Previous Gold Cup qualifications
1	Jamaica	13 November 2016	15 (1990, 1991, 1992, 1993, 1995, 1996, 1997, 1998, 1999, 2001, 2005, 2008, 2010, 2012, 2014)	9 (1991, 1993, 1998, 2000, 2003, 2005, 2009, 2011, 2015)
2	French Guiana	9 November 2016	3 (1995, 2012, 2014)	0 (Debut)
3	Curaçao	11 October 2016	3 (1989, 1998, 2014)	0 (Debut)
4	Martinique	11 October 2016	12 (1990, 1991, 1992, 1993, 1994, 1996, 1997, 1998, 2001, 2007, 2010, 2012, 2014)	4 (1993, 2002, 2003, 2013)

=== Qualified teams for fifth place play-off ===
3 teams from the third round (best three group runners-up) qualified for the fifth place play-off.

Pos	Grp	Team	Pld	W	W+	L	GF	GA	GD	Pts	Qualification
1	4	Trinidad and Tobago	2	1	0	1	4	2	+2	3	Qualification to Fifth place play-off
2	1	Suriname	2	0	1	1	3	3	0	3	Qualification to Fifth place play-off
3	2	Haiti	2	0	1	1	4	5	−1	3	Qualification to Fifth place play-off
4	3	Antigua and Barbuda	2	1	0	1	2	3	−1	3	

Source: CONCACAF

There was confusion as to whether wins and goals scored in extra time count when comparing teams between different groups as laid out by the CFU regulations. Ultimately, they were counted and Haiti qualified to the fifth place play-off over Antigua and Barbuda.

== Fifth place play-off ==
3 teams competed in the fifth place play-off:

- 3 teams qualified from the third round.

1 team from the fifth place play-off qualified for the CONCACAF Gold Cup CFU–UNCAF play-off.

Pos	Team	Pld	W	D	L	GF	GA	GD	Pts	Qualification
1	Haiti	2	2	0	0	8	5	+3	6	Qualification to 2017 CONCACAF Gold Cup CFU–UNCAF play-off
2	Suriname	2	1	0	1	4	5	−1	3	
3	Trinidad and Tobago (H)	2	0	0	2	4	6	−2	0	

Source: CONCACAF
(H) Hosts
4 January 2017
19:00 UTC−4

Trinidad and Tobago	1–2 (a.e.t.)	Suriname
Charles 82'	Report	Kwasie 76'; Rozenblad 110'

Ato Boldon Stadium, Couva
Referee: Kimbell Ward (Saint Kitts and Nevis)

6 January 2017
19:00 UTC−4

Suriname	2–4	Haiti
Apai 87'; Eduard 90+1'	Report	Hérold 25'; Jean-Baptiste 42'; Désiré 48'; Faerber 80' (o.g.)

Ato Boldon Stadium, Couva
Referee: Michel Rodríguez (Cuba)

8 January 2017
17:00 UTC−4

Haiti	4–3 (a.e.t.)	Trinidad and Tobago
Etienne 20'; Belfort 39', 111'; Jean-Baptiste 117'	Report	Winchester 1', 25', 113'

Ato Boldon Stadium, Couva
Referee: Ricangel de Leça (Aruba)

=== Qualified team for CONCACAF Gold Cup CFU–UNCAF play-off ===
Haiti (fifth place play-off winner) qualified for the 2017 CONCACAF Gold Cup CFU–UNCAF play-off, but lost to Nicaragua and failed to qualify for the 2017 CONCACAF Gold Cup.

== Goalscorers ==
7 goals

- (Curaçao) Gino van Kessel
- (Curaçao) Felitciano Zschusschen

5 goals

- (Puerto Rico) Héctor Ramos

4 goals

- (Curaçao) Leandro Bacuna
- (Dominica) Julian Wade
- (Martinique) Steeven Langil

3 goals

- (Dominican Republic) Jonathan Faña
- (French Guiana) Rhudy Evens
- (French Guiana) Sloan Privat
- (Grenada) Shavon John-Brown
- (Saint Kitts and Nevis) Harry Panayiotou
- (Suriname) Mitchell Kisoor
- (Trinidad and Tobago) Kevin Molino
- (Trinidad and Tobago) Shahdon Winchester

2 goals

- (Antigua and Barbuda) Peter Byers
- (Antigua and Barbuda) Calaum Jahraldo-Martin
- (Curaçao) Rangelo Janga
- (Dominica) Chad Bertrand
- (Dominica) Kelrick Walters
- (Dominican Republic) Darly Batista
- (French Guiana) Arnold Abelinti
- (French Guiana) Ludovic Baal
- (French Guiana) Roy Contout
- (Grenada) Jamal Charles
- (Grenada) Shane Rennie
- (Guyana) Anthony Abrams
- (Guyana) Marcel Barrington
- (Guyana) Trayon Bobb
- (Guyana) Adrian Butters
- (Guyana) Dwight Peters
- (Guyana) Ricky Shakes
- (Haiti) Kervens Belfort
- (Haiti) Andrew Jean-Baptiste
- (Haiti) Duckens Nazon
- (Jamaica) Cory Burke
- (Martinique) Yoann Arquin
- (Martinique) Kévin Parsemain
- (Puerto Rico) Juan Coca
- (Puerto Rico) Olvin Ortiz
- (Suriname) Stefano Rijssel
- (Suriname) Ivanildo Rozenblad
- (United States Virgin Islands) Trevor Wrensford

1 goal

- (Antigua and Barbuda) Dexter Blackstock
- (Antigua and Barbuda) AJ George
- (Antigua and Barbuda) Tevaughn Harriette
- (Antigua and Barbuda) Keiran Murtagh
- (Antigua and Barbuda) Josh Parker
- (Antigua and Barbuda) Stefan Smith
- (Aruba) Frederick Gomez
- (Barbados) Romario Harewood
- (Bermuda) Reggie Lambe
- (Bermuda) Tre Ming
- (Bermuda) Jonte Smith
- (Cuba) Alberto Gómez
- (Cuba) Daniel Luis Sáez
- (Curaçao) Gevaro Nepomuceno
- (Dominican Republic) Rony Beard
- (Dominican Republic) Edipo Rodríguez
- (French Guiana) Alex Eric
- (French Guiana) Kévin Rimane
- (Grenada) Moron Phillip
- (Grenada) Jake Rennie
- (Grenada) Kimo Sampson
- (Guadeloupe) Elbert Anatol
- (Guadeloupe) Claudio Beauvue
- (Guadeloupe) Gilles Dan
- (Guadeloupe) Livio Nabab
- (Guyana) Solomon Austin
- (Guyana) Brandon Beresford
- (Guyana) Neil Danns
- (Guyana) Sheldon Holder
- (Guyana) Kai McKenzie-Lyle
- (Guyana) Devon Millington
- (Guyana) Vurlon Mills
- (Guyana) Chris Nurse
- (Guyana) Gregory Richardson
- (Haiti) Jonel Désiré
- (Haiti) Wilde-Donald Guerrier
- (Haiti) Derrick Etienne
- (Haiti) Charles Hérold Jr.
- (Haiti) Mechack Jérôme
- (Jamaica) Shaun Francis
- (Jamaica) Je-Vaughn Watson
- (Jamaica) Dicoy Williams
- (Martinique) Stéphane Abaul
- (Martinique) Johan Audel
- (Martinique) Jean-Sylvain Babin
- (Martinique) Mathias Coureur
- (Martinique) Jordy Delem
- (Martinique) Bruno Grougi
- (Martinique) Daniel Hérelle
- (Martinique) Antoine Jean-Baptiste
- (Puerto Rico) Jorge Rivera
- (Puerto Rico) Mike Ramos
- (Saint Kitts and Nevis) Javeim Blanchette
- (Saint Kitts and Nevis) Romaine Sawyers
- (Saint Vincent and the Grenadines) Myron Samuel
- (Sint Maarten) Ramsleii Boelijn
- (Suriname) Dimitrie Apai
- (Suriname) Sergino Eduard
- (Suriname) Guno Kwasie
- (Suriname) Galgyto Talea
- (Suriname) Melvin Valies
- (Trinidad and Tobago) Cordell Cato
- (Trinidad and Tobago) Tyrone Charles
- (United States Virgin Islands) Asanti Herring

Own goals

- (British Virgin Islands) Ryan Dicker (playing against Dominica)
- (Dominica) Malcolm Joseph (playing against Martinique)
- (Sint Maarten) Rick de Punder (playing against Grenada)
- (Suriname) Gillermo Faerber (playing against Haiti)
