= Trevor Wrensford =

Personal information
- Full name: Trevor Wrensford, Jr.
- Date of birth: 7 October 1989 (age 37)
- Place of birth: St. Kitts and Nevis
- Positions: Midfielder; forward

Team information
- Current team: Raymix

Senior career*
Years	Team	Apps	(Gls)
2007–2009	St Thomas/Trinity Strikers FC		
2009–	Raymix		

International career^{‡}
2016–	United States Virgin Islands	6	(2)
- * Club domestic league appearances and goals as of 22:37, 30 March 2016 (UTC) ‡ National team caps and goals as of 23:39, 26 June 2021 (UTC)

Trevor Wrensford, Jr. is a US Virgin Islands soccer player, who currently plays as a midfielder for Raymix of the St. Thomas League, and the United States Virgin Islands national team.

== Club career ==
Beginning in at least 2007, Wrensford was part of St Thomas/Trinity Strikers FC of the Saint Kitts Premier Division. In 2009, he was selected as part of the League XI representative team that season. Wrensford played for Raymix of the St. Thomas League beginning in at least 2009. He was still with Raymix in December 2015 as the team won its second straight St. Thomas Championship. During the final match of the season, Wrensford scored a goal as Raymix defeated Haitian Victory 3–2 to secure the title.

== International career ==
Wrensford was raised on St. Kitts and Nevis but qualifies to represent the U.S. Virgin Islands through his father who is from Saint Thomas. In March 2016, Wrensford was named to the United States Virgin Islands squad for 2017 Caribbean Cup qualification. He made his international debut in the team's first match, an away fixture against Sint Maarten. He scored the game-winner of the 2–1 victory for his first international goal. He scored again in his second match, a 1–2 defeat to Grenada national football team, with USVI advancing to the second round despite the loss.

== Career statistics ==
=== International ===
As of match played 5 September 2019

Appearances and goals by national team and year
National team	Year	Apps	Goals
United States Virgin Islands	2016	4	2
United States Virgin Islands	2017	0	0
United States Virgin Islands	2018	1	0
United States Virgin Islands	2019	1	0
United States Virgin Islands	2020	0	0
United States Virgin Islands	2021	0	0
United States Virgin Islands	Total	6	2

Scores and results list United States Virgin Islands's goal tally first, score column indicates score after each Wrensford goal.

List of international goals scored by Trevor Wrensford
#	Date	Venue	Opponent	Score	Result	Competition
1.	26 March 2016	Raoul Illidge Sports Complex, Philipsburg, Sint Maarten	Sint Maarten	2–1	2–1	2017 Caribbean Cup qualification
2.	29 March 2016	Addelita Cancryn Ground, Charlotte Amalie, United States Virgin Islands	Grenada	1–1	1–2	2017 Caribbean Cup qualification

== See also ==
- List of top international men's football goalscorers by country
