= Marcel Barrington =

Footballer (born 1995)

Personal information
- Date of birth: 28 August 1995 (age 31)
- Place of birth: London, England
- Position: Forward

Team information
- Current team: Leatherhead

Youth career
- –2013: Stoke City

Senior career*
Years	Team	Apps	(Gls)
2013	Stoke City	0	(0)
2013	→ Harrow Borough (loan)	6	(1)
2013–2015	Leicester City	0	(0)
2014	→ Ilkeston (loan)	3	(1)
2014–2015	→ Nuneaton Town (loan)	4	(1)
2015	→ Bishop's Stortford (loan)	4	(0)
2015	Walton Casuals	7	(1)
2016	Tooting & Mitcham United	13	(1)
2016	Margate	12	(0)
2016	→ Grays Athletic (loan)	1	(0)
2016–2017	Tooting & Mitcham United	5	(0)
2017	Hendon	19	(4)
2017–2019	Braintree Town	40	(6)
2019	Hampton & Richmond Borough	9	(2)
2019	Concord Rangers	10	(1)
2019–2020	Dartford	1	(0)
2020	Walton Casuals	6	(0)
2020	Staines Town	2	(0)
2020–2021	Welling United	3	(0)
2021–2022	Cray Valley Paper Mills	36	(20)
2022–2023	Herne Bay	35	(15)
2023	Erith & Belvedere	8	(1)
2023–2026	Cray Valley Paper Mills	81	(12)
2026–	Leatherhead	12	(2)

International career^{‡}
2015–	Guyana	7	(3)
- * Club domestic league appearances and goals as of 19:29, 19 August 2026 (UTC) ‡ National team caps and goals as of 22:48, 30 March 2019 (UTC)

Marcel Barrington (born 28 August 1995) is a semi-professional footballer who plays as a forward for Isthmian League Premier Division club Leatherhead. Born in England, he represents the Guyana national football team.

Barrington began his career with Stoke City, and made his senior debut while on loan with Harrow Borough. He later joined Leicester City in January 2014, and featured for the Under-21s in between loan spells. Barrington represented both Nuneaton Town and Bishop's Stortford on short-term loans, before his release from the Foxes with the conclusion of the 2014–15 season.

The striker joined Walton Casuals in November 2015, before switching to league rivals Tooting & Mitcham United in January 2016. Barrington signed a contract Margate during the close season, but after a short loan spell with Grays Athletic, returned to his former side in December 2016. After a short spell back at Tooting & Mitcham, Barrington opted to join Hendon for the remainder of the campaign. Preceding the start of the 2017–18 campaign, Barrington was rewarded with a move to National League South side Braintree Town.

He is a Guyana international having made his debut in July 2015 in 2018 World Cup qualification.

== Club career ==
Barrington began his career with Stoke City, where he featured for the Under-18s. He then gained his first taste of senior football two days after his 18th birthday, joining Harrow Borough on loan. He completed 90 minutes just once in the one-month spell, and scored in the 3–1 victory over Dulwich Hamlet in September 2013.

He then swapped the Britannia Stadium for the King Power Stadium, joining Leicester City in January 2014, before having a brief loan spell with Ilkeston in the Northern Premier League. After returning to Leicester, Barrington initially joined up with the Under-18s, and headed into the Under-21s ahead of the 2014–15 season after signing a contract extension.

His next move came in November 2014, with the striker joining Nuneaton Town on a two-month loan. Once again, he scored a single goal in his temporary stay. Called up by manager Kevin Wilkin for his side's National League tie with Chester, Barrington grabbed Nuneaton's third goal to secure victory on his debut. He went on to make four more appearances for the non-League club, before being called back to represent Leicester's youth side during the loan spell.

Returning to Leicester with the conclusion of his loan in late January, he spent two months with the Foxes before signing for Bishop's Stortford. Barrington managed just four appearances for the club and failed to find the net in two months. He remained at the club until the end of the season, and was subsequently released the day after Nigel Pearson's departure as manager. He made a total of 12 appearances in the Under-21 Premier League.

Jamaal Shabazz soon rewarded Barrington with an international call-up, and he made his debut for Guyana on 15 June 2015 in a World Cup Qualifier. Playing in the final 18 minutes, he was cautioned in the final moments of the game in a 4–4 draw with St. Vincent and the Grenadines having replaced Trayon Bobb.

Barrington began the 2015–16 season without a club, despite having featured for Charlton Athletic on trial during pre-season friendlies. He eventually joined Isthmian Division One South club Walton Casuals in November 2015, where he scored one goal in eight appearances. Making his debut in a 3–2 defeat to Tooting & Mitcham United, he scored his side's only goal three weeks later in a 1–1 draw with Faversham Town. His final appearance for the club come in early December, and he was released shortly after.

Barrington was without a club for six weeks after his departure from the Moatside Stadium, but soon returned to action in the Isthmian Division One South with Tooting & Mitcham United in mid-January. He scored one goal in 16 appearances for the club in all competitions. On 8 March 2016, he received a call-up to the Guyana national squad ahead of the country's participation in the 2017 Caribbean Cup qualification. Barrington scored his first international goal in Guyana's opening fixture on 22 March 2016, concluding the scoring in a 7–0 victory over Anguilla after coming off the bench.

On 22 July 2016, Barrington signed for National League South side Margate. After impressing for the club during a pre-season trial, which saw him score five goals in two games, he was rewarded with a one-year deal. Barrington joined Isthmian League Premier Division club Grays Athletic on loan on 8 September 2016. Due to budget constraints, he was released in December 2016.

On 9 December 2016, Barrington returned to former club Tooting & Mitcham United for a second spell. After a short one-month spell at Tooting & Mitcham, Barrington opted to join fellow Isthmian League side Hendon. Barrington went onto feature twenty-one times for Hendon, scoring four goals before leaving to join National League South side Braintree Town in August 2017. He went onto make his Braintree debut during their 2–0 home victory over Chippenham Town, replacing Karl Oliyide in the 80th minute.

In September 2020, he joined National League South side Welling United. Before that, he had a brief spell at Staines Town. In May 2021, Barrington moved to Cray Valley Paper Mills, scoring 22 goals in 42 appearances in all competitions. He subsequently joined Herne Bay in 2022. Following Herne Bay's relegation, he joined Erith & Belvedere in September 2023. He returned to Cray Valley Paper Mills in November 2023.

In March 2026, Barrington departed Cray Valley Paper Mills, joining Leatherhead shortly after.

== International career ==
Barrington registered his first cap for Guyana in their 2018 FIFA World Cup qualification (CONCACAF) fixture against Saint Vincent and the Grenadines, replacing Trayon Bobb in the 72nd minute during the 4–4 draw.

== Career statistics ==
=== Club ===
As of match played 7 March 2026

Appearances and goals by club, season and competition
Club	Season	League			FA Cup		Other		Total	
Club	Season	Division	Apps	Goals	Apps	Goals	Apps	Goals	Apps	Goals
Stoke City	2013–14	Premier League	0	0	0	0	0	0	0	0
Harrow Borough (loan)	2013–14	Isthmian League Premier Division	6	1	2	0	0	0	8	1
Leicester City	2013–14	Championship	0	0	0	0	0	0	0	0
Leicester City	2014–15	Premier League	0	0	0	0	0	0	0	0
Leicester City	Total		0	0	0	0	0	0	0	0
Ilkeston (loan)	2013–14	Northern Premier League Premier Division	3	1	0	0	0	0	3	1
Nuneaton Town (loan)	2014–15	Conference Premier	4	1	0	0	1 (Note: Appearance(s) in FA Trophy)	0	5	1
Bishop's Stortford (loan)	2014–15	Conference South	4	0	0	0	0	0	4	0
Walton Casuals	2015–16	Isthmian League Division One South	7	1	0	0	1 (Note: Appearance(s) in Surrey Senior Cup)	0	8	1
Tooting & Mitcham United	2015–16	Isthmian League Division One South	13	1	0	0	3 (Note: One appearance in Surrey Senior Cup; two appearances in London Senior Cup)	0	16	1
Margate	2016–17	National League South	12	0	1	0	2	0	15	0
Grays Athletic (loan)	2016–17	Isthmian League Premier Division	1	0	0	0	1 (Note: Appearance(s) in Alan Turvey Trophy)	0	2	0
Tooting & Mitcham United	2016–17	Isthmian League Division One South	5	0	0	0	2 (Note: One appearance in Surrey Senior Cup; one appearance one goal in London Senior Cup)	1	7	1
Hendon	2016–17	Isthmian League Premier Division	19	4	0	0	2 (Note: Appearance(s) in Middlesex Senior Cup)	0	21	4
Braintree Town	2017–18	National League South	30	5	0	0	6 (Note: Three appearances one goal in FA Trophy; three appearances in National League South play-offs)	1	36	6
Braintree Town	2018–19	National League	10	1	1	0	1	0	12	1
Braintree Town	Total		40	6	1	0	7	1	48	7
Hampton & Richmond Borough	2018–19	National League South	9	2	0	0	0	0	9	2
Concord Rangers	2019–20	National League South	10	1	0	0	0	0	10	1
Dartford	2019–20	National League South	1	0	0	0	0	0	1	0
Staines Town	2019–20	Isthmian League South Central Division	2	0	0	0	0	0	2	0
Welling United	2020–21	National League South	3	0	1	0	1	0	5	0
Cray Valley Paper Mills	2021–22	Isthmian League South East Division	36	20	1	0	5 (Note: One appearance in FA Trophy, three appearances and one goal in the Alan Turvey Trophy and one appearance in Isthmian League South East Division play-offs)	2	42	22
Herne Bay	2022–23	Isthmian League Premier Division	35	15	2	1	1	0	38	16
Erith & Belvedere	2023–24	Isthmian League South East Division	8	1	0	0	1 (Note: Appearance(s) in Kent Senior Cup)	0	9	1
Cray Valley Paper Mills	2023–24	Isthmian League South East Division	21	5	0	0	0	0	21	5
Cray Valley Paper Mills	2024–25	Isthmian League Premier Division	33	3	2	0	4 (Note: Two appearances in FA Trophy, one appearance in Alan Turvey Trophy, one appearance in Isthmian League Premier Division play-offs)	0	39	3
Cray Valley Paper Mills	2025–26	Isthmian League Premier Division	27	4	4	1	2	0	33	5
Cray Valley Paper Mills	Total		81	12	6	1	6	0	93	13
Career total			299	66	14	2	33	4	346	72

=== International ===
Scores and results list Guyana's goal tally first.

List of international goals scored by Marcel Barrington
No.	Date	Venue	Opponent	Score	Result	Competition	Ref.
1	22 March 2016	Providence Stadium, Providence, Guyana	Anguilla	7–0	7–0	2017 Caribbean Cup qualification	
2	8 October 2016	André Kamperveen Stadion, Paramaribo, Suriname	Suriname	1–0	2–3	2017 Caribbean Cup qualification	
