= Juan Coca =

Puerto Rican footballer

Personal information
- Full name: Juan Antonio Agustin Coca Nogueres
- Date of birth: 31 May 1993 (age 33)
- Place of birth: San Juan, Puerto Rico
- Position: Striker

Team information
- Current team: San Marco Avenza
- Number: 11

Youth career
- 2002–2007: Guaynabo Fluminense
- 2007–2011: Adianez Eagles
- 2012: Notre Dame Falcons

Senior career*
Years	Team	Apps	(Gls)
2008–2011	Guaynabo Fluminense		
2013	Liverpool Warriors	2	(0)
2013	Burgos B	8	(1)
2014–	Kultsu FC	55	(7)

International career^{‡}
2012–2013	Puerto Rico U-20	6	(0)
2012–2019	Puerto Rico	17	(2)
- * Club domestic league appearances and goals as of 25 July 2012 ‡ National team caps and goals as of 2019

Juan Antonio Agustin Coca Nogueres (born 31 May 1993 in San Juan) is a Puerto Rican footballer, who plays as a striker for Kultsu FC.

== Career ==
Coca started his career with the Eagles soccer team of the Colegio Adianez in Guaynabo and played club side for Conquistadores Guaynabo FC. He played until 2011 for the college and later began his senior career with Club Conquistadores de Guaynabo SC in the Puerto Rico Soccer League. He played three years for Guaynabo Fluminense FC before leaving for his studies at Notre Dame College in Ohio. During his studies, he spent a half year with National Premier Soccer League club Liverpool Warriors, but played only two games with the team. In June 2013, he signed for the reserve side of Spanish club Burgos CF in the Primera Categoria León.

On 20 March 2014, Coca signed for Kakkonen club Kultsu FC.

== International ==
Coca is a member of the Puerto Rico national football team and played his debut on 6 January 2012 in a friendly game against Nicaragua in the Bayamón Soccer Complex in Bayamón. Coca was also part of the preliminary squad for the 2012 FIFA U-20 World Cup and played in the 2013 CONCACAF Under 20 Championship in Mexico.

=== International goals ===
Scores and results list Puerto Rico's goal tally first.

No	Date	Venue	Opponent	Score	Result	Competition
1.	26 March 2016	Raymond E. Guishard Technical Centre, The Valley, Anguilla	Anguilla	1–0	4–0	2017 Caribbean Cup qualification
2.	26 March 2016	Raymond E. Guishard Technical Centre, The Valley, Anguilla	Anguilla	3–0	4–0	2017 Caribbean Cup qualification
