= Mitchell Kisoor =

Surinamese footballer

Personal information
- Full name: Mitchell Kisoor
- Date of birth: 6 November 1989 (age 36)
- Place of birth: Suriname
- Position: Midfielder

Team information
- Current team: S.V. Robinhood

Senior career*
Years	Team	Apps	(Gls)
- S.V. Robinhood

International career^{‡}
2014–2017	Suriname	8	(2)
- * Club domestic league appearances and goals ‡ National team caps and goals as of 7 January 2017

Mitchell Kisoor (born 6 November 1989) is a former Surinamese international footballer who played as a midfielder.

Kisoor scored three goals for the Suriname national football team during the 2017 Caribbean Cup qualification.
