= Brandley Kuwas =

Curaçaoan footballer

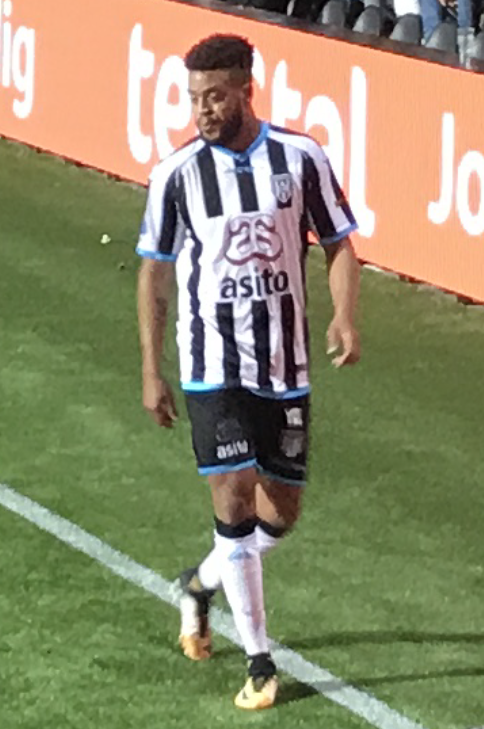
- Kuwas with Heracles Almelo in 2017

Personal information
- Full name: Brandley Mack-Olien Kuwas
- Date of birth: 19 September 1992 (age 34)
- Place of birth: Hoorn, Netherlands
- Height: 1.78 m (5 ft 10 in)
- Position: Winger

Youth career
- –2004: Hellas Sport
- 2004–2007: AZ
- 2007–2009: Hellas Sport
- 2009–2012: KFC

Senior career*
Years	Team	Apps	(Gls)
2012–2015	Volendam	103	(15)
2015–2016	Excelsior	34	(4)
2016–2019	Heracles Almelo	96	(21)
2019–2021	Al Nasr	31	(5)
2021	→ Al Jazira (loan)	13	(3)
2021–2022	Maccabi Tel Aviv	28	(3)
2022–2024	Giresunspor	38	(2)
2024–2026	Volendam	61	(9)

International career^{‡}
2017–	Curaçao	36	(2)
- * Club domestic league appearances and goals as of 19 May 2026 ‡ National team caps and goals as of 25 June 2026

Brandley Mack-Olien Kuwas (born 19 September 1992) is a professional footballer who plays as a winger. Born in the Netherlands, he plays for the Curaçao national team.

== International career ==
Kuwas is of Curaçaoan descent, and played an unofficial match for the Curaçao national football team against Dutch club Excelsior in November 2016. Kuwas made his international debut for Curaçao in a friendly 1–1 tie with El Salvador on 22 March 2017.

== Career statistics ==
As of match played 23 May 2026

Appearances and goals by club, season and competition
Club	Season	League			National Cup		Continental		Other		Total	
Club	Season	Division	Apps	Goals	Apps	Goals	Apps	Goals	Apps	Goals	Apps	Goals
Volendam	2012–13	Eerste Divisie	32	5	1	0	0	0	4 (Note: Appearances in the 2012–13 Eerste Divisie promotion play-offs)	1	37	6
Volendam	2013–14	Eerste Divisie	34	2	1	0	0	0	0	0	35	2
Volendam	2014–15	Eerste Divisie	37	8	3	0	0	0	4 (Note: Appearances in the 2014–15 Eerste Divisie promotion play-offs)	1	44	9
Volendam	Total		103	15	5	0	0	0	8	2	116	17
Excelsior	2015–16	Eredivisie	34	4	2	0	0	0	0	0	36	4
Excelsior	Total		34	4	2	0	0	0	0	0	36	4
Heracles Almelo	2016–17	Eredivisie	33	6	3	1	2 (Note: Appearances in the Europa League)	0	0	0	38	7
Heracles Almelo	2017–18	Eredivisie	30	5	2	0	0	0	0	0	32	5
Heracles Almelo	2018–19	Eredivisie	35	10	2	0	0	0	0	0	37	10
Heracles Almelo	Total		98	21	7	1	2	0	0	0	107	22
Al-Nasr SC	2019–20	UAE Pro League	19	3	6	1	0	0	0	0	25	4
Al-Nasr SC	2020–21	UAE Pro League	12	2	1	0	0	0	0	0	13	2
Al-Nasr SC	Total		31	5	7	1	0	0	0	0	38	6
Al Jazira	2020–21	UAE Pro League	12	3	0	0	0	0	0	0	12	3
Al Jazira	Total		12	3	0	0	0	0	0	0	12	3
Maccabi Tel Aviv	2021–22	Israeli Premier League	27	3	5	0	8	1	1 (Note: Appearances in the Toto Cup)	0	41	4
Maccabi Tel Aviv	2022–23	Israeli Premier League	1	0	0	0	0	5	0	0	6	0
Maccabi Tel Aviv	Total		28	3	5	0	13	1	1	0	47	4
Giresunspor	2022–23	Süper Lig	27	1	3	0	—		—		30	1
Giresunspor	2023–24	TFF 1 Lig	11	1	0	0	—		—		11	1
Giresunspor	Total		38	2	3	0	—		—		41	2
FC Volendam	2024–25	Eerste Divisie	29	4	1	1	—		—		30	5
FC Volendam	2025–26	Eerste Divisie	32	5	3	2	—		2 (Note: Appearances in promotion play-offs)	0	37	7
FC Volendam	Total		61	9	4	3	—		2	0	67	12
Career total			405	62	33	5	15	1	11	2	464	70

=== International ===
As of match played 25 June 2026

Appearances and goals by national team and year
National team	Year	Apps	Goals
Curaçao	2017	1	0
Curaçao	2018	3	1
Curaçao	2019	5	0
Curaçao	2021	6	0
Curaçao	2022	2	0
Curaçao	2023	8	0
Curaçao	2024	3	0
Curaçao	2025	4	0
Curaçao	2026	4	0
Total		36	2

=== International goals ===
Scores and results list Curaçao's goal tally first.

No.	Date	Venue	Opponent	Score	Result	Competition
1.	10 September 2018	Ergilio Hato Stadium, Willemstad, Curaçao	Grenada	3–0	10–0	2019–20 CONCACAF Nations League qualification
2.	5 June 2021	Estadio El Trébol, Guatemala City, Guatemala	British Virgin Islands	1–0	8–0	2022 FIFA World Cup qualification
