= Guno Kwasie =

Surinamese footballer

Personal information
- Full name: Guno Jeflin Kwasie
- Date of birth: 13 November 1985 (age 40)
- Place of birth: Suriname
- Position: Defender

Team information
- Current team: WBC

Senior career*
Years	Team	Apps	(Gls)
20??–2014	SV Robinhood		
2014–	Walking Bout Company		

International career^{‡}
2012–	Suriname	15	(1)
- * Club domestic league appearances and goals ‡ National team caps and goals as of 7 January 2017

Guno Kwasie (born 13 November 1985) is a Surinamese footballer who currently plays for Walking Bout Company and the Suriname national football team.

== International career ==
Guno Kwasie has been playing for Suriname since 2012. His debut was against French Guiana in a friendly match on June 9, 2012. Although playing as a left defender he managed to score a goal. The goal he scored was on January 4, 2017 in the 5th place playoff of the 2017 Caribbean Cup qualification. He scored against Trinidad and Tobago, after he shot the ball only to be deflected by a defender and thus going in goal.

=== International goals ===
Scores and results list Suriname's goal tally first.

No	Date	Venue	Opponent	Score	Result	Competition
1.	4 January 2017	Ato Boldon Stadium, Couva, Trinidad and Tobago	Trinidad and Tobago	1–0	2–1	2017 CONCACAF Gold Cup qualification
