= Virgill Najoe =

Surinamese footballer

Personal information
- Full name: Virgill Najoe
- Date of birth: 18 July 1988 (age 38)
- Place of birth: Paramaribo, Suriname
- Height: 1.80 m (5 ft 11 in)
- Position: Striker

Team information
- Current team: Broki

Senior career*
Years	Team	Apps	(Gls)
2011–2016	SV Excelsior		
2016–2018	PVV		
2018–	Broki		

International career
2013–2014	Suriname	4	(2)
- * Club domestic league appearances and goals

Virgill Najoe (born 18 July 1988) is a Surinamese professional footballer who plays as a striker for Suriname Major League club Broki.

== International career ==
Najoe made his debut for Suriname in a 2–0 friendly win against Bonaire on 14 November 2013. Several days later, he scored his first two international goals, both in a friendly against Curaçao, as Suriname was victorious 3–1.

=== International goals ===
Suriname score listed first, score column indicates score after each Najoe goal.

International goals by date, venue, opponent, score, result and competition
No.	Cap	Date	Venue	Opponent	Score	Result	Competition	Ref.
1	2	17 November 2013	Ergilio Hato Stadium, Willemstad, Curaçao	Curaçao	2–1	3–1	Friendly	
2	2	17 November 2013	Ergilio Hato Stadium, Willemstad, Curaçao	Curaçao	3–1	3–1	Friendly	
