= Felitciano Zschusschen =

Curaçaoan footballer (born 1992)

Personal information
- Full name: Felitciano Cederick Zschusschen
- Date of birth: 24 January 1992 (age 34)
- Place of birth: Breda, Netherlands
- Height: 1.87 m (6 ft 2 in)
- Position: Forward

Youth career
- Baronie
- NAC Breda
- Twente

Senior career*
Years	Team	Apps	(Gls)
2013–2016	Twente	7	(0)
2013–2016	Jong Twente	36	(17)
2014	→ Dordrecht (loan)	7	(0)
2015	→ NAC Breda (loan)	9	(0)
2015–2016	→ FC Oss (loan)	32	(12)
2017	1. FC Saarbrücken	6	(0)
2017–2018	Inverness Caledonian Thistle	2	(0)
2018	IJsselmeervogels	0	(0)
2018	Chabab Rif Al Hoceima	0	(0)
2018–2019	IJsselmeervogels	27	(6)
2019–2022	VVSB	32	(16)
2022–2023	Huizen		
2023–2024	HSV Wasmeer		
2024–	VV Advendo '57		

International career
2015–2017	Curaçao	12	(8)
- * Club domestic league appearances and goals as of 15 January 2026

Felitciano Cederick Zschusschen (Dutch pronunciation: [feːliˈtɕaːnoː ˈsysə(n)]; born 24 January 1992) is a professional footballer who plays as a forward.

== Club career ==
On 10 March 2013, Zschusschen made his professional debut in the match of FC Twente against Vitesse. On 21 January 2014, he was sent on loan at FC Dordrecht until the end of the season. The first half of the 2014–15 season he played for Jong FC Twente in the Dutch Eerste Divisie. He made a second loan spell at Eredivisie side NAC Breda in February 2015. He signed for Scottish club Inverness Caledonian Thistle in July 2017. However Felitciano left the club in the January transfer window after being a benchwarmer for a majority of the season due to multiple injuries restricting his gametime.

He returned to the Netherlands to play for IJsselmeervogels in 2018. However, only one month after arriving, he moved to Moroccan side Chabab Rif Al Hoceima in August 2018, where former AZ striker Mounir El Hamdaoui worked as director of football. He then returned to IJsselmeervogels in September after failing to obtain a playing license in Morocco. After one season, he joined Dutch fourth-tier club, VVSB.

== International career ==
Zschusschen made his debut for the Curaçao national team in a qualification match for the 2018 World Cup against Montserrat on 28 March 2015. He also got his first goal for the national team by scoring from a penalty.

== Career statistics ==
=== Club ===
As of 15 October 2018

Appearances and goals by club, season and competition
Club	Season	League			National cup		League cup		Other		Total	
Club	Season	Division	Apps	Goals	Apps	Goals	Apps	Goals	Apps	Goals	Apps	Goals
FC Twente	2012–13	Eredivisie	6	0	0	0	–		–		6	0
FC Twente	2014–15	Eredivisie	1	0	0	0	–		–		1	0
FC Twente	Total		7	0	0	0	0	0	0	0	7	0
Jong FC Twente	2013–14	Eerste Divisie	19	10	0	0	–		–		19	10
Jong FC Twente	2014–15	Eerste Divisie	17	7	0	0	–		–		17	7
Jong FC Twente	Total		36	17	0	0	0	0	0	0	36	17
FC Dordrecht (loan)	2013–14	Eerste Divisie	7	0	0	0	–		–		7	0
NAC Breda	2014–15	Eredivisie	9	0	0	0	–		3 (Note: Appearances in the promotion/relegation play-offs)	0	12	0
FC Oss	2015–16	Eerste Divisie	0	0	1	0	–		–		1	0
1. FC Saarbrücken	2016–17	Regionalliga Südwest	6	0	0	0	–		–		6	0
Inverness Caledonian Thistle	2017–18	Scottish Championship	2	0	0	0	3	0	0	0	5	0
IJsselmeervogels	2018–19	Tweede Divisie	4	1	0	0	–		–		4	1
Career total			71	18	1	0	3	0	3	0	78	11

=== International ===
As of match played 7 June 2016
Scores and results list Curaçao's goal tally first, score column indicates score after each Zschusschen goal.

List of international goals scored by Felitciano Zschusschen
No.	Date	Venue	Cap	Opponent	Score	Result	Competition
1	27 March 2015	Ergilio Hato Stadium, Willemstad, Curaçao	1	Montserrat	2–1	2–1	2018 FIFA World Cup qualification
2	26 March 2016	Ergilio Hato Stadium, Willemstad, Curaçao	6	Dominican Republic	2–1	2–1	2017 Caribbean Cup qualification
3	1 June 2016	Ergilio Hato Stadium, Willemstad, Curaçao	7	Guyana	2–0	5–2	2017 Caribbean Cup qualification
4	1 June 2016	Ergilio Hato Stadium, Willemstad, Curaçao	7	Guyana	3–0	5–2	2017 Caribbean Cup qualification
5	1 June 2016	Ergilio Hato Stadium, Willemstad, Curaçao	7	Guyana	4–1	5–2	2017 Caribbean Cup qualification
6	7 June 2016	Ergilio Hato Stadium, Willemstad, Curaçao	8	U.S. Virgin Islands	2–0	7–0	2017 Caribbean Cup qualification
7	7 June 2016	Ergilio Hato Stadium, Willemstad, Curaçao	8	U.S. Virgin Islands	6–0	7–0	2017 Caribbean Cup qualification
8	11 October 2016	Juan Ramón Loubriel Stadium, Bayamón, Puerto Rico	10	Puerto Rico	3–2	4–2	2017 Caribbean Cup qualification
9	22 March 2017	Stadion dr. Antoine Maduro, Willemstad, Curaçao	11	El Salvador	1–0	1–1	Friendly

== Honours ==
1. FC Saarbrücken

- Saarland Cup: 2016–17

Curaçao

- Caribbean Cup: 2017

Individual

- 2017 Caribbean Cup qualification top scorer (shared with Gino van Kessel)
