= Gino van Kessel =

Curaçaoan footballer

Personal information
- Full name: Gino Ronald van Kessel
- Date of birth: 9 March 1993 (age 33)
- Place of birth: Alkmaar, Netherlands
- Height: 1.85 m (6 ft 1 in)
- Position: Forward

Team information
- Current team: Tesla Stropkov

Youth career
- Kolping Boys
- SV Vrone
- Telstar
- 2008–2012: AZ
- 2012–2013: Ajax

Senior career*
Years	Team	Apps	(Gls)
2013–2014	Ajax	0	(0)
2013	→ Almere City (loan)	10	(1)
2013–2014	→ AS Trenčín (loan)	25	(10)
2014	Arles-Avignon	14	(2)
2015–2016	AS Trenčín	47	(23)
2016–2018	Slavia Prague	7	(2)
2017	→ Lechia Gdańsk (loan)	3	(0)
2017–2018	→ Oxford United (loan)	23	(3)
2018–2019	Roeselare	14	(1)
2019	Spartak Trnava	2	(0)
2019	→ AS Trenčín (loan)	13	(3)
2020	AS Trenčín	10	(3)
2020–2021	Olympiakos Nicosia	20	(3)
2021–2022	Dalkurd	0	(0)
2022	Gyirmót	3	(0)
2023–2024	Michalovce	33	(5)
2025–2026	Forca Kochi	7	(2)
2026–	Tesla Stropkov	0	(0)

International career^{‡}
2015–	Curaçao	25	(8)
- * Club domestic league appearances and goals as of 1 November 2024 ‡ National team caps and goals as of 9 March 2024

Gino Ronald van Kessel (born 9 March 1993) is a Curaçaoan professional footballer who plays as a forward for the Slovak club MŠK Tesla Stropkov.

== Club career ==
=== Youth career ===
Van Kessel joined the youth ranks of AZ Alkmaar in 2008. In 2012, he finished as top scorer of the 2012 Copa Amsterdam with 5 goals.

In the same year, Van Kessel joined Ajax. In 2013, he again became top scorer of the Copa Amsterdam, netting three goals for the Amsterdam side.

=== Ajax ===
Initially, Van Kessel was part of Ajax's reserve squad.

For the 2013–14 season he returned to Ajax. Following his second appearance in the Copa Amsterdam in which he again finished as top scorer of the tournament, Van Kessel was given the number 34 shirt and participated in the Ajax pre-season training camp. He also appeared in a friendly fixture against SDC Putten, coming on in the second half for Tobias Sana in the 1–4 away victory.

==== Almere City (loan) ====
In December 2012, Van Kessel was loaned to neighboring Almere City FC, where he played in the Dutch Jupiler League for the remainder of the 2012–2013 season. In Almere he was rejoined with his fellow Ajax teammates Sven Nieuwpoort and Henri Toivomaki, all playing for Almere City on loan from Ajax. During his loan period, he appeared in ten league matches, scoring once.

==== AS Trenčín (loan) ====
On 14 July 2013, it was announced that Van Kessel would serve a six-month loan spell in Slovakia, playing for FK AS Trenčín in the Slovak Super Liga until the winter transfer window in January. At Trenčín, a club owned by former Ajax player Tschen La Ling, he was given the number 9 shirt.

He was on the bench in Sweden for his new club's UEFA Europa League qualifying match against IFK Göteborg on 18 July 2013 but did not make an appearance in the 0–0 draw. Instead he made his debut for Trenčín in a regular season 2–1 away loss against Spartak Trnava. Van Kessel started in the striker position, and was substituted off in the 61st minute, after having been cautioned in the 56th minute. He made his continental debut on 8 August 2013, in a UEFA Europa League qualifying match against Astra Giurgiu, having been brought in for Karol Mondek in the 61st minute, and scoring in the 88th minute. The match ended in a 2–2 resulting in a 3–5 aggregate loss for AS Trenčín, and elimination in the third qualifying round. A few days later, on 11 August 2013, Van Kessel scored his first league goal in an encounter with DAC which ended in a 6–0 victory for Trenčín. On 1 December 2013, Van Kessel returned to Amsterdam with AS Trenčín sitting in second place in their league table at the time of his return, making a total of 16 league appearances, scoring 8 goals, and six assists during league play, having also scored once in the Europa League while playing for the Slovak side.

On 18 January 2014, his loan was extended until 1 July 2014 for an additional six months completing the season with the Slovak side.

=== Arles-Avignon ===
On 25 August 2014, it was announced that Van Kessel had joined the French Ligue 2 side from Avignon, signing a two-year contract with the club. He made his debut for Arles-Avignon in an away match against Nîmes Olympique on 29 August 2014 which ended in a 2–2 draw. On 12 September 2014, he scored his first goal for Arles-Avignon in a 1–0 victory at home against Tours FC.

=== Return to Trenčín ===
On 1 January 2015, Van Kessel returned to Trenčín, the club where he had previously won both "MVP" and "Fans Favorite" club awards during his loan spell from Ajax. He made his first appearance of the season on 28 February 2015 in a 2–0 home win against Dukla Banská Bystrica.

=== Slavia Prague ===
In July 2016, Van Kessel joined the Czech side Slavia Prague becoming one of the most expensive players ever bought by a Czech team with a transfer fee equivalent to €1.2 million. On 21 July 2016, he played his first game with Slavia, scoring a goal and an assist against Levadia Tallinn in a second qualifying round match of the UEFA Europa League.

==== Lechia Gdańsk (loan) ====
On the final day of the 2016–17 winter transfer window, it was announced that Van Kessel would serve out the remainder of the season on a six-month loan spell with Polish club Lechia Gdańsk competing in the Ekstraklasa, the top flight of football in Poland. During his half-season in Poland, he only appeared in three league matches, playing for a combined total of 166 minutes.

==== Oxford United (loan) ====
In August 2017, Van Kessel joined English side Oxford United on loan from Slavia Prague. He scored a fantastic individual goal just 3 minutes after replacing Marvin Johnson to mark a fairytale debut appearance for the Yellows in a 3–0 home victory over Portsmouth in League One.

=== Roeselare ===
On 9 August 2018, van Kessel signed for Belgian second division side K.S.V. Roeselare on a one-year contract.

=== Spartak Trnava ===
On 19 July 2019 he returned to Slovakia signing with first-tier side FC Spartak Trnava. He made one appearance in a friendly match against Bulgarian side Lokomotiv Plovdiv on 25 July 2019.

==== AS Trenčín (loan) ====
He was subsequently loaned out on a 6-month loan spell to his former club AS Trenčín.

=== Third spell at Trenčín ===
On the final transfer day of the winter transfer window for the 2019–20 Slovak First Football League, Van Kessel was transferred to his former club following a successful six-month loan spell. He played a total of 26 matches for Trenčín that season, scoring six goals.

=== Olympiakos Nicosia ===
In July 2020, Van Kessel left for two seasons to Olympiakos Nicosia. In March 2021, his contract was terminated in connection with the COVID-19 pandemic in Cyprus, returning to the Netherlands in search of a new club.

=== Dalkurd FF ===
On 16 August 2021 it was announced that Van Kessel had signed with Swedish club Dalkurd FF, competing in the Ettan Fotboll Division 1, the third tier of professional football in Sweden.

=== Gyirmót ===
On 20 January 2022, after having made zero appearances for Dalkurd, Van Kessel moved to Hungarian NB I side Gyirmót FC Győr on a free transfer.

=== Zemplín Michalovce ===
On 6 September 2023, Van Kessel joined MFK Zemplín Michalovce on a free transfer.

=== CA Pulpileño ===
After being released by Zemplín, Van Kessel joined CA Pulpileño on 21 March 2025.

== International career ==
=== Curaçao national team ===
On 24 May 2015, it was announced that Van Kessel had received his first International call-up by head coach Patrick Kluivert to represent Curaçao in the 2018 FIFA World Cup qualifying match against Cuba on 7 June 2015. He made his first appearance in a 0–0 draw at home on 10 June 2015, coming on as a 69-minute substitute. He made his debut on 10 June 2015 in the home leg against Cuba which ended in a 0–0 draw, coming on as a 69th-minute substitute for Quenten Martinus. Curaçao were able to defeat Cuba based on the away goal rule following a 1–1 draw in Havana, thus qualifying for the Third round of CONCACAF qualification.

Curaçao were eliminated from qualifications in the third round by El Salvador, losing both matches 1–0 with Van Kessel playing the full 90 minutes in both matches, failing to qualify for the 2018 FIFA World Cup in Russia. On 26 March 2016, Van Kessel scored his first goal for the national team in his sixth match for Curaçao in a 2017 Caribbean Cup qualification match against the Dominican Republic. Curaçao advanced to the second round, with a 2–1 win. In the following round, the team defeated Guyana (5–2) and the U.S. Virgin Islands (7–0) advancing to the third round. Van Kessel scored twice against Guyana, while scoring a hattrick against the U.S. Virgin Islands.

On 11 October 2016, Curaçao finished the third qualifying round ahead of the 2017 Caribbean Cup atop of their group, finishing ahead of Antigua and Barbuda and Puerto Rico, thus qualifying for the final tournament, as well as the 2017 CONCACAF Gold Cup. It was the country's first berth to the finals of the Continental tournament since the dissolution of the Netherlands Antilles, and their first time to the tournament since 1969.

Having appeared in all qualifying matches, Van Kessel finished as joint top scorer of the qualification rounds of the tournament, together with his teammate Felitciano Zschusschen, with 7 goals each. As a result, he was subsequently nominated for the 2016 CONCACAF Best XI selection, losing to contenders André-Pierre Gignac and Bryan Ruiz in the process.

== Career statistics ==
=== Club ===
As of match played 26 November 2016

Season	Club	League			Cup		Continental^{1}		Other^{2}		Total	
Season	Club	Division	Apps	Goals	Apps	Goals	Apps	Goals	Apps	Goals	Apps	Goals
Ajax	2012–13	Eredivisie	0	0	–		–		–		0	0
Almere City (loan)	2012–13	Eerste Divisie	10	1	–		–		–		10	1
AS Trenčín (loan)	2013–14	Corgoň Liga	24	10	–		1	1	–		25	11
Arles-Avignon	2014–15	Ligue 2	8	2	1	0	–		2	0	11	2
AS Trenčín	2014–15	Fortuna Liga	14	6	4	2	–		–		18	8
AS Trenčín	2015–16	Fortuna Liga	33	17	5	7	2	0	–		40	24
AS Trenčín	Total		47	23	9	9	2	0	0	0	58	32
Slavia Prague	2016–17	Czech League	7	2	2	1	5	1	–		14	4
Lechia Gdańsk (loan)	2016–17	Ekstraklasa	3	0	0	0	0	0	–		3	0
Oxford United (loan)	2017–18	EFL League One	1	1	0	0	–		0	0	1	1
Career total			100	39	12	10	8	2	2	0	122	51

^{1} Includes UEFA Champions League and UEFA Europa League matches.

^{2} Includes Johan Cruijff Shield, Slovak Super Cup and Coupe de la Ligue matches.

=== International ===
As of matches played 27 September 2022

Curaçao national team
Year	Apps	Goals
2015	4	0
2016	6	7
2017	8	0
2018	1	1
2019	5	0
2022	1	0
Total	25	8

=== International goals ===
As of match played 5 October 2016 Curaçao score listed first, score column indicates score after each van Kessel goal.

International goals by date, venue, cap, opponent, score, result and competition
No.	Date	Venue	Cap	Opponent	Score	Result	Competition
1	26 March 2016	Ergilio Hato Stadium, Willemstad, Curaçao	6	Dominican Republic	1–0	2–1	2017 Caribbean Cup qualification
2	1 June 2016	Ergilio Hato Stadium, Willemstad, Curaçao	7	Guyana	2–1	5–2	2017 Caribbean Cup qualification
3	1 June 2016	Ergilio Hato Stadium, Willemstad, Curaçao	7	Guyana	4–1	5–2	2017 Caribbean Cup qualification
4	7 June 2016	Ergilio Hato Stadium, Willemstad, Curaçao	8	U.S. Virgin Islands	1–0	7–0	2017 Caribbean Cup qualification
5	7 June 2016	Ergilio Hato Stadium, Willemstad, Curaçao	8	U.S. Virgin Islands	3–0	7–0	2017 Caribbean Cup qualification
6	7 June 2016	Ergilio Hato Stadium, Willemstad, Curaçao	8	U.S. Virgin Islands	5–0	7–0	2017 Caribbean Cup qualification
7	5 October 2016	Ergilio Hato Stadium, Willemstad, Curaçao	9	Antigua and Barbuda	3–0	3–0	2017 Caribbean Cup qualification
8	23 March 2018	Ergilio Hato Stadium, Willemstad, Curaçao	19	Bolivia	1–0	1–1	Friendly

== Honours ==
AS Trenčín

- Fortuna Liga: 2014–15, 2015–16
- Slovak Cup: 2014–15, 2015–16

Slavia Prague

- Czech First League: 2016–17

Curaçao

- Caribbean Cup: 2017
- King's Cup: 2019

Individual

- Copa Amsterdam top scorer: 2012, 2013
- AS Trenčín Most Valuable Player: 2013–14
- AS Trenčín Fans' Favorite Player of the Year: 2013–14
- Slovak First Football League top scorer: 2015–16
- Slovak First Football League top assist provider: 2019–20
- Nominated for CONCACAF Male Best XI 2016 Selection
- EFL League One Goal of the Month: August 2017
- Caribbean Cup Golden Boot: 2017
- Caribbean Cup qualification top scorer: 2017 (shared with Felitciano Zschusschen)
