= Ryan Dicker =

English footballer

Personal information
- Full name: Ryan James Dicker
- Date of birth: 22 September 1986 (age 40)
- Place of birth: Stoke-on-Trent, England
- Position: Centre back

Team information
- Current team: Crewe Alexandra (assistant manager)

Youth career
- Alsager Town

Senior career*
Years	Team	Apps	(Gls)
2006–2008	Alsager Town	18	(1)
2008–2011	Newcastle Town	51	(4)
2011–2012	Stafford Rangers		
2012–2013	Kidsgrove Athletic		
2013–2015	Leek Town		
2015–2016	Kidsgrove Athletic		
2016–2017	Leek Town		

International career
2015–	British Virgin Islands	5	(0)
- * Club domestic league appearances and goals as of 21 February 2020

Ryan Dicker (born 22 September 1986) is an English former professional footballer who played as a central defender for Leek Town and the British Virgin Islands national football team.

He is currently Crewe Alexandra assistant manager.

== Club career ==
=== Newcastle Town ===
Dicker joined Newcastle Town on 31 July 2008. He made his debut on 10 August 2008. Whilst at Newcastle Town he accumulated one yellow card, two red cards, and scored four goals in 51 appearances.

Having previously played for Alsager Town, Newcastle Town, Nantwich Town and Stafford Rangers, he joined Leek Town in 2013.

== International career ==
He was called up to the British Virgin Islands national team and made his debut on 22 March 2015 in a friendly match against Antigua and Barbuda.

== Coaching career ==
Dicker also serves as an academy coach for Crewe Alexandra.

On 1 August 2023, Dicker was appointed assistant manager at Crewe Alexandra having previously been U18s manager at the club.

== Career statistics ==
=== International ===
As of match played 26 March 2016

National team	Year	Apps	Goals
British Virgin Islands	2014	3	0
British Virgin Islands	2015	2	0
Total		5	0
