= Asanti Herring =

American soccer player (born 1997)

Personal information
- Full name: Asanti Imari Herring
- Date of birth: 9 December 1997 (age 28)
- Place of birth: Chicago, United States
- Height: 1.78 m (5 ft 10 in)
- Position: Midfielder

Youth career
- 2013–2016: Chicago Fire

Senior career*
Years	Team	Apps	(Gls)
2017	Irlam		
2017–2018	Stein	7	(0)
2018–2019	Sonnefeld	22	(0)
2020–2022	Saint Appolinaire	0	(0)
2023–2024	Halkian Alku	16	(5)
2024–2025	Sprint-Jeløy II	3	(1)

International career
2016–2021	United States Virgin Islands	6	(1)
- * Club domestic league appearances and goals

Asanti Imari Herring (born 9 December 1997) is a footballer who plays as a forward for the United States Virgin Islands national team.

== Club career ==
Having left the Chicago Fire academy, Herring moved to England to continue his education. While in England, Herring turned out for semi-professional side Irlam.

For the 2017–18 season Herring joined FC Stein of the Bezirksliga Mittelfranken-Nord. During his season with the club he scored eleven goals in eleven matches for the reserve side but was unable to score in seven league appearances for the first team. The following year he joined TSV Sonnefeld of the Landesliga Bayern-Nordost. During his first season with the club he made 22 league appearances.

In 2023 he moved to Turku in Finland; initially attempting to join Kakkonen club PIF, he instead joined Halkian Alku of the then-fifth-tier Nelonen, after visa issues prevented him from joining PIF. He moved to Norway in August 2024, signing with Sprint-Jeløy, though he was assigned to their second team in the 4. divisjon.

== International career ==
Herring was named in the US Virgin Islands squad for 2017 Caribbean Cup qualification, and made his debut against Sint Maarten, scoring the first goal of a 2–1 win.

== Career statistics ==
=== Club ===
As of 23 June 2025

Appearances and goals by club, season and competition
Club	Season	League			Cup		Other		Total	
Club	Season	Division	Apps	Goals	Apps	Goals	Apps	Goals	Apps	Goals
FC Stein	2017–18	Kreisliga Nürnberg/Frankenhöhe 2	7	0	0	0	0	0	7	0
TSV Sonnefeld	2018–19	Landesliga Bayern-Nordost	22	0	0	0	0	0	22	0
Saint Appolinaire	2020–21	Championnat National 3	– (Note: Season cancelled due to the COVID-19 pandemic in France)							
Saint Appolinaire	2021–22	Championnat National 3	0	0	0	0	0	0	0	0
Saint Appolinaire	Total		0	0	0	0	0	0	0	0
Halkian Alku	2023	Nelonen	16	5	0	0	0	0	16	5
Sprint-Jeløy II	2024	4. divisjon	2	1	0	0	0	0	2	1
Sprint-Jeløy II	2025	5. divisjon	1	0	0	0	0	0	1	0
Sprint-Jeløy II	Total		3	1	0	0	0	0	3	1
Career total			48	6	0	0	0	0	48	6

=== International ===
As of match played 2 January 2022

Appearances and goals by national team and year
National team	Year	Apps	Goals
United States Virgin Islands	2016	4	1
United States Virgin Islands	2021	2	0
Total		6	1

Scores and results list US Virgin Islands' goal tally first, score column indicates score after each Herring goal.

List of international goals scored by Asanti Herring
No.	Date	Venue	Opponent	Score	Result	Competition
1	26 March 2016	Raoul Illidge Sports Complex, Philipsburg, Sint Maarten	Sint Maarten	1–0	2–1	2017 Caribbean Cup qualification
