= Rick de Punder =

Dutch footballer

Personal information
- Date of birth: 4 September 1986 (age 40)
- Place of birth: Goes, Netherlands
- Height: 1.78 m (5 ft 10 in)
- Position: Defender

Youth career
- De Patrijzen

Senior career*
Years	Team	Apps	(Gls)
2005-2015	GOES		
2016-2017	Funmakers		
2017-2022	GOES		
2022-2023	Luctor Heinkenszand		
2023-2024	SSV '65		
2024-2025	Luctor Heinkenszand		

International career
2016-2022	Sint Maarten	5	(0)
- * Club domestic league appearances and goals

Rick de Punder' (born 4 September 1986) is a retired footballer who played as a defender or midfielder. Born in the Netherlands, he was a Sint Maarten international.
