= Ayinde Augustus =

United States Virgin Islands soccer player

Personal information
- Date of birth: 27 December 1988 (age 37)
- Position: Midfielder

Team information
- Current team: Orlando City U-23

Senior career*
Years	Team	Apps	(Gls)
2007–2011	Rovers FC		
2011–	Orlando City U-23		

International career^{‡}
2008–	United States Virgin Islands	10	(1)
- * Club domestic league appearances and goals as of 20 September 2011 ‡ National team caps and goals as of 22:47, 12 April 2012 (UTC)

Ayinde Augustus (born 27 December 1988) is a United States Virgin Islands international soccer player who plays for the Orlando City U-23, as a midfielder.

== Career ==
Augustus has played for Rovers FC and Central Florida Kraze, now called Orlando City U-23.

He made his international debut for United States Virgin Islands in 2008, and has appeared in FIFA World Cup qualifying matches.
