= Addelita Cancryn Junior High School Ground =

Cricket ground in United States Virgin Islands

- Interactive map of Addelita Cancryn Junior High School Ground

Ground information
- Location: Charlotte Amalie, United States Virgin Islands
- Country: West Indies
- Coordinates: 18.3369°N 64.9476°W
- Establishment: c. 1992

Team information
Leeward Island	(2003–2016)
United States Virgin Islands	(1993–present)
- As of 12 January 2013; Source: Cricinfo

The Addelita Cancryn Junior High School Ground was a cricket ground located in Charlotte Amalie, the capital of the United States Virgin Islands. The ground was part of the Addelita Cancryn Junior High School. More recently it was used for parking shipping containers for Crown Bay Industrial Park.

== History ==
The first recorded cricket match played on the ground saw a United States Virgin Islands President's XI play a friendly match against Trinidad and Tobago in 1992. The United States Virgin Islands cricket team is first recorded as playing there in 1993 against Anguilla in the 1993 Leeward Islands One-Day Championship. First-class cricket was first played in 2003 when the Leeward Islands cricket team played Trinidad and Tobago in the 2002/03 Carib Beer Cup. The ground has since held five first-class matches for the Leeward Islands, the last of which saw the team play the Windward Islands in the 2008/09 Regional Four Day Competition. Eight first-class centuries have been scored there, while five wicket hauls have also been taken.

== Records ==
=== First-class ===
- Highest team total: 432 all out by Barbados v Leeward Islands, 2003/04
- Lowest team total: 158 all out by Leeward Islands v Trinidad and Tobago, 2002/03
- Highest individual innings: 211 not out by Sherwin Campbell for Barbados v Leeward Islands, 2003/04
- Best bowling in an innings: 6/50 by Darren Sammy for Windward Islands v Leeward Islands, 2004/05

== See also ==
- List of cricket grounds in the West Indies
