= Nelson Chai =

American investment banker and financial executive

Nelson Joosuk Chai
- Born: 1965 (age 60–61); New York City, US
- Education: University of Pennsylvania; Harvard University
- Employer: Uber
- Known for: New York Stock Exchange-Archipelago Exchange merger
- Title: CFO
- Spouse: Jung
- Children: 3

Korean name
- Hangul: 채주석
- RR: Chae Juseok
- MR: Ch'ae Chusŏk

Nelson Joosuk Chai (born 1965) is an American investment banker and financial executive. He formerly served as the chief financial officer of American financial services company Merrill Lynch and briefly as Bank of America's president for the Asia-Pacific region. He is the former president of CIT Group and reported directly to then CEO John Thain. On August 21, 2018, it was announced that Chai has been hired as the chief financial officer of Uber.

== Career ==
Chai served in senior positions at AlliedSignal and Philip Morris before joining medical diagnostics products manufacturer Dade Behring in 1997 as corporate vice president of worldwide field finance; he later became their senior vice president of business development.

=== Archipelago ===
Chai was named chief financial officer of Chicago, Illinois-based electronic communication network company Archipelago Exchange in June 2000. Chai was a major driving force behind the merger between Archipelago and the New York Stock Exchange; he repeatedly pressured his boss Archipelago CEO Gerald Putnam, to meet with NYSE officials, though Putnam felt that the NYSE would be uninterested and hoped instead to pursue an acquisition of rival ECN Instinet. In April 2005, when Archipelago formally announced its pending acquisition by the NYSE, it was decided that Chai would take over as CFO of the NYSE in May 2006 from Amy Butte, who had held that position since February 2004. Butte later decided to leave the exchange entirely rather than continue at her planned new position as executive vice president of strategy and product development. In 2006, Chai received a salary of $750,000 and a bonus of $825,000 from the NYSE; combined with other payments, his cash compensation for the year totalled $2,168,922.

=== Merrill Lynch ===
On 3 December 2007, John Thain, the new chief executive officer at Merrill Lynch and Chai's former boss at the NYSE, announced that Chai would join Merrill in the position of chief financial officer starting on 10 December; the move was part of a management shake-up at Merrill, initiated due to their losses in the subprime mortgage crisis. Chai replaced Jeffrey Edwards, who had held the position of CFO since 2005; Thain stated Edwards would assume another unspecified role within Merrill. Chai's new employer revealed that he would receive a bonus of $2.5 million for the 2007 fiscal year, split evenly between cash and stock, for his three weeks of work that year, bringing his total compensation for the year to $3.1 million. Merrill justified the bonus by pointing out that Chai would not receive any year-end incentive payment from his previous employer. Chai was slated to receive a salary of $600,000 in 2008. However, he and other top-level Merrill executives received no bonus that year, due to the 2008 financial crisis.

=== Bank of America ===
When Bank of America (BofA) acquired Merrill Lynch in late 2008, they named Chai to head their Asia business. BofA planned to relocate Chai to Hong Kong for his new position. He replaced Jason Brand, who had worked at BofA for 15 years. However, Chai departed from BofA in February, just two weeks after the ouster of Thain, and was replaced by Ki-Myung Hong. He had not yet relocated to Hong Kong at the time he quit. His departure left just one other member of Thain's management team in place at BofA, Tom Montag as head of sales and trading.

=== CIT Group ===
In early 2010, the CIT Group reportedly approached Chai about the CFO position there after they hired Thain as CEO. In June, they announced that Chai would be coming on board, but in the capacity of chief administrative officer and head of strategy instead. Chai's new responsibilities at CIT include global infrastructure and operating architecture, leadership of the insurance and consumer finance divisions, as well as business development and strategic planning. A little over a year later, in August 2011, he was named CIT's president; following the promotion, he would keep his prior responsibilities as CAO and head of strategy, and in addition would take charge of CIT's corporate finance and vendor finance businesses. His total compensation package for 2011 was $1.7 million, down by 40% from 2010, reflecting a broader downward trend in executive compensation packages at CIT to which the only exceptions were Thain himself and transportation division president Jeffrey Knittel.

=== Uber ===
On August 21, 2018, Uber announced that Chai had been appointed chief financial officer. He assumed the role on September 10, 2018, becoming the company's first CFO in more than three years. Chai had previously been president and CEO of The Warranty Group.

Chai served as CFO during Uber's initial public offering and its early years as a public company. Under his tenure, Uber reported its first quarter of positive adjusted EBITDA. He helped move the company from billions of dollars in losses toward improved earnings and strong free cash flow.

In July 2023, Chai announced he planned to leave Uber, describing his departure as the most senior executive exit since the IPO. Uber confirmed his resignation in August 2023, and Chai remained with the company until January 5, 2024 to assist with the transition. Prashanth Mahendra-Rajah succeeded him as CFO on November 13, 2023.

=== DailyPay ===
In January 2025, Chai joined DailyPay, a provider of earned wage access, as executive chairman. On October 1, 2025, the company announced his appointment as chief executive officer.

== Board service ==
Thermo Fisher Scientific elected Chai to its board of directors in December 2010. Chai was also elected to the board of Chubb Limited at its 2024 annual general meeting.

Chai has served on the board of directors of the United States-India Business Council since August 17, 2007. He is also a member of the national board of directors of the U.S. Fund for UNICEF.

== Personal life and other activities ==
Chai was born in 1965 in New York City to Korean immigrant parents. He studied as an undergraduate at the University of Pennsylvania, and went on to receive an MBA from the Harvard Business School. He has three children with his wife Jung. They lived in Lake Forest, Illinois before moving to New York City.
