= Arthur B. Hancock =

American Thoroughbred racehorse breeder

- Born: June 26, 1875; Ellerslie, Virginia; United States
- Died: April 1, 1957 (aged 81); Kentucky
- Resting place: Paris Cemetery, Paris, Kentucky
- Education: Johns Hopkins University, University of Chicago
- Occupation: Thoroughbed racehorse owner/breeder
- Known for: Claiborne Farm
- Spouse: Nancy Tucker Clay
- Children: Arthur Jr.
- Parent(s): Richard Johnson Hancock & Thomasia Overton Harris
- Honors: Pillar of the Turf (2018)

Arthur Boyd Hancock (June 26, 1875 - April 1, 1957) was a breeder of thoroughbred racehorses who established Claiborne Farm in Paris, Kentucky, United States.

Born at Ellerslie Estate in Albemarle County, Virginia, near Charlottesville, Arthur Hancock was a brother to scholar and educator Harris Hancock (1867–1944). Their father, Capt. Richard Johnson Hancock, owned Ellerslie Stud in Albemarle County and Arthur chose to follow in his father's footsteps. Racing in partnership with Major Thomas W. Doswell, Capt. Hancock won the 1884 Preakness Stakes with Knight of Ellerslie.

In 1908, Arthur Hancock married Nancy Tucker Clay of Paris, Kentucky who inherited a family farm property they named Claiborne Farm. Arthur Hancock expanded the Ellerslie Stud to his wife's Kentucky property and eventually transferred the bulk of his operation there. In 1946, Arthur Hancock sold Ellerslie Stud to Robert Schlesinger.

Importing breeding stock from Europe, Arthur Hancock made Claiborne Farm an international leader in breeding, sales, and racing. He bred Vigil, the 1923 Preakness Stakes winner. Among his famous sires was Sir Gallahad III purchased from France who was the leading sire in 1930, 1933, 1934, and 1940 and who sired 1930 U.S. Triple Crown winner Gallant Fox. Hancock was part of a 1936 consortium that imported Blenheim from England and in 1944 he purchased Princequillo who became the leading U.S. sire for 1957 and 1958.

During his lifetime, Arthur Hancock was active in various institutions that helped his industry. He served as president of the Thoroughbred Horse Association, was a voting trustee of the Keeneland Association on its establishment in 1936, and was part of the executive of the Kentucky State Racing Commission.

In 1945, Hancock suffered a heart attack then two years later, the first of several strokes. As a result, Arthur Jr. took over the running of the business. Arthur Hancock died in 1957.

In 2018, Arthur Hancock was posthumously voted into the National Museum of Racing and Hall of Fame as one of its esteemed Pillars of the Turf.
