= Jeff Peek =

American finance industry executive

Jeffrey Peek
- Born: 1946 or 1947 (age 79–80); United States
- Education: Princeton University (BA); Harvard Business School (MBA)
- Occupation: Finance industry executive
- Known for: Heading CIT Group until it was reorganized due to the 2008 financial crisis
- Title: Bank of America (Executive Vice Chairman, 2015)
- Spouse: Liz Peek
- Children: 3

Jeffrey Peek is a finance industry executive. He headed CIT Group from 2003 until it was reorganized following the 2008 financial crisis.

== Career ==
Peek joined CIT after being turned down as a potential CEO from Merrill Lynch, where he had been employed for almost 20 years, and a 19-month spell at Credit Suisse Group. He was directly responsible for expanding CIT into lending subprime mortgages and student loans. This made the company vulnerable to changes in the market, and after the 2008 financial crisis, the group plunged into debt. CIT lost £5 billion in the nine quarters up to fall 2009 under Peek's leadership. He resigned following an announcement from bondholders that the company would need to restructure $31 billion of debt. Following his resignation from CIT, the company's shares dropped by 85%, putting it close to bankruptcy. He was replaced by former Merrill Lynch CEO John Thain. He was criticised for expanding CIT too quickly, but colleagues think he may have simply suffered from bad timing.

Business Insider commented, "Humbled and hormone-deprived, Peek goes hat-in-hand to Washington, looking for taxpayer cash." However, BI also said that "in going down this path, he was no different than many of his fellow chief executives on Wall Street."

In 2015, Peek was hired by Bank of America as an executive vice chairman.

== Marriage and children ==
Peek is married to columnist and former investment analyst Liz Peek. They have three children. Their son, Andrew Peek, studied at Princeton, Harvard, Johns Hopkins and the University of Texas at Austin, is a veteran of the US Army, and has worked for the Heritage Foundation and for two Republican US Senators and one Republican Congressman. He briefly served in each of the Trump administrations; as part of the State Department during Trump's first term, and as an advisor at the NSC during Trump's second term.
