= Jacqueline Alemany =

American journalist (born 1989)

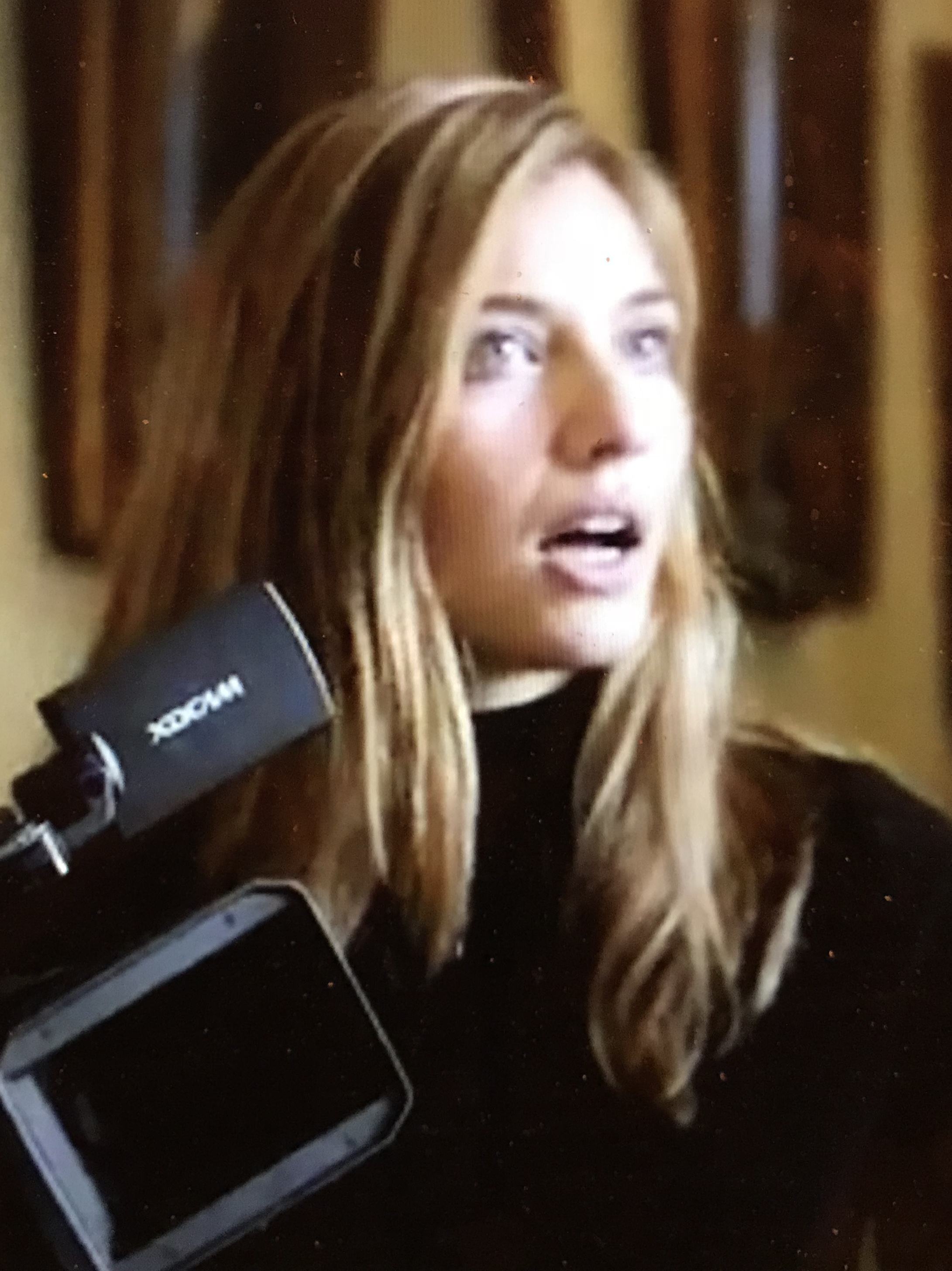
- Born: Jacqueline Michele Alemany; February 24, 1989 (age 37); Scarsdale, New York, U.S.
- Education: Harvard University (BA)
- Occupations: Journalist, news reporter, anchor
- Spouse: Jake Levine (m. 2024)
- Children: 1
- Mother: Ellen Luciani Alemany

Jacqueline Michele Alemany (born February 24, 1989) is an American journalist and political reporter, who is an anchor for MS NOW. She was previously a congressional correspondent for The Washington Post, where she authored the early-morning newsletter Power Up and covered policy issues including the opioid crisis. In 2021, she was appointed anchor of The Early 202, a political newsletter of The Washington Post.

== Early life and education ==
Alemany was born on February 24, 1989, in Scarsdale, New York, a suburb of New York City. She attended Scarsdale High School. Her parents are Ellen (née Luciani) and Joaquin "Jack" Alemany. Her mother is the descendant of Italian immigrants and her father is the son of Valencian immigrants from Spain. Her mother served as president, chairman, and CEO of CIT Group.

Alemany graduated from Harvard University in 2011, with a degree in government. She was the Harvard Crimson women's basketball team captain during her senior year.

== Journalism career ==
Alemany started her career in the page program at CBS News, before being hired as a multimedia reporter in 2012, specializing in domestic and foreign affairs, politics, and general news. At CBS News, Alemany covered the 2016 presidential campaign as a digital reporter. As a TV network "embed" who lived in the primary state for much of the 2015 primary race, Alemany was included in the HuffPost documentary series New Hampshire.

In August 2017, Alemany participated as an IWMF Fellow in the African Great Lakes Reporting Initiative to Zanzibar, Tanzania.

Alemany joined The Washington Post in 2018 after six years at CBS News to author PowerUp, an early-morning newsletter that focused on national politics, the White House and Congress. In 2021, she was appointed a congressional correspondent. Alemany also worked as a contributor at Vogue and the Huffington Post. In September 2021, she was appointed anchor and contributor to The Early 202, a morning newsletter of The Washington Post. On March 4, 2025, it was announced that Alemany would join the new panel of MS NOW's The Weekend.

== Personal life ==
On October 3, 2024, Alemany married Jake Levine, a special assistant to President Joe Biden.
