= Liz Peek =

American Conservative commentator and business analyst

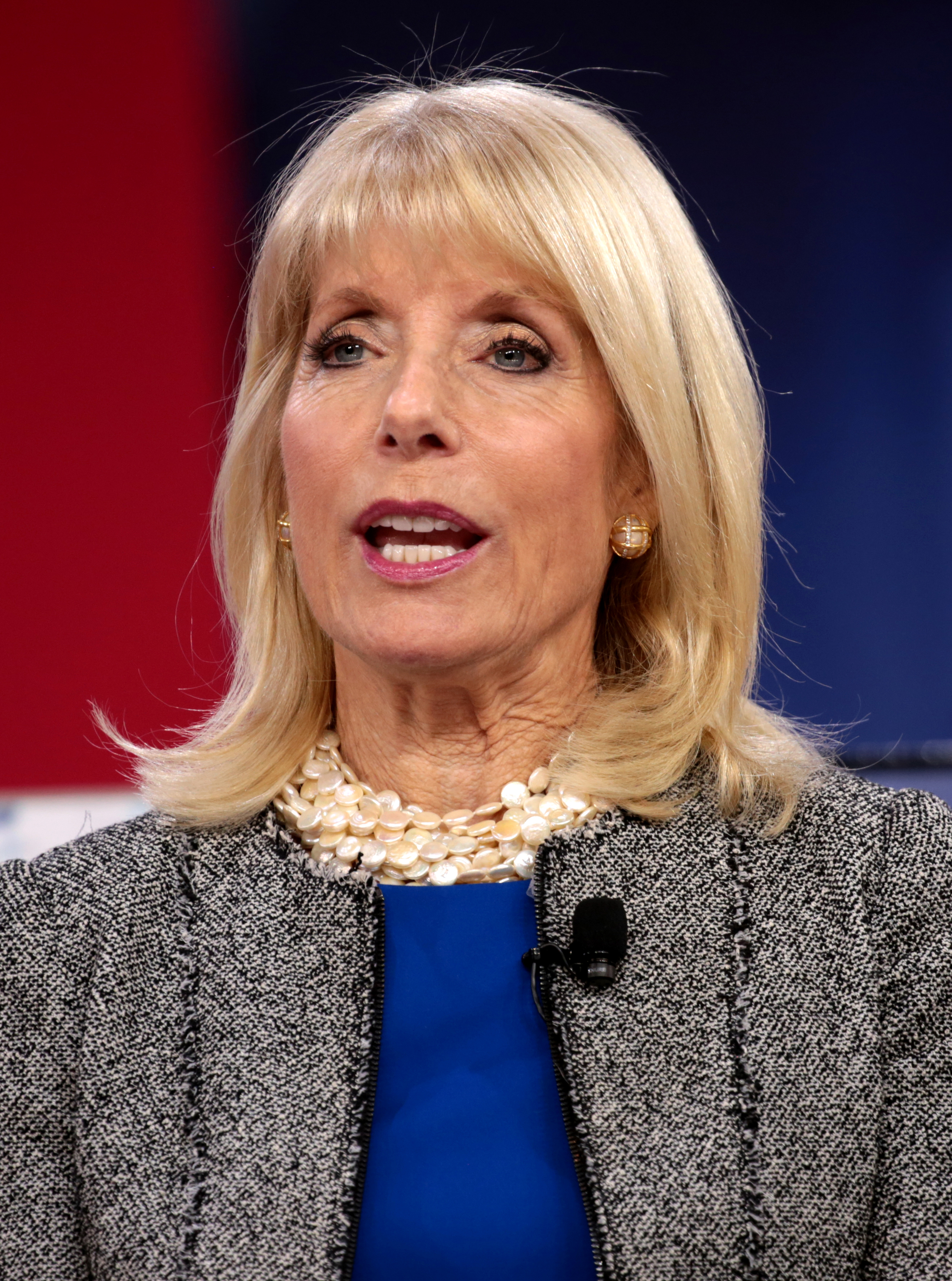
- February 2018
- Born: January 10, 1949 (age 77); United States
- Education: Wellesley College
- Occupations: political commentator; business analyst
- Years active: 1975-
- Known for: The Wall Street Journal
- Spouse: Jeff Peek
- Children: 3

Liz Peek (born Elizabeth Ann Taylor, January 10, 1949) is an American commentator and business analyst on the finance industry and government. She is a Fox News contributor.

== Education ==
Peek graduated as a Durant scholar from Wellesley College with an Honors Degree.

== Career ==
Peek spent more than 20 years on Wall Street as a research analyst focused on the oil industry. She began working for Wertheim & Company in 1975 and in 1983, was one of the first women to become partner at a Wall Street investment firm. She left Wall Street in 1990 to raise her children, but remained active as a commentator. She has written for The Fiscal Times, Fox News, the New York Sun, The Wall Street Journal, Alternate Universe, the Motley Fool, and Women on the Web and has appeared on Fox Business with Neil Cavuto and Fox & Friends. Peek contributes opinion pieces to The Hill.

Peek was the first woman elected president of the National Association of Petroleum Investment Analysts and was also a member of Institute of Chartered Financial Analysts. She serves as executive vice president of the board of Women's Committee of the Central Park Conservancy and on the board and executive committee of the School of American Ballet.

In August 2012, she was named chairman of the Board of Trustees of the Fashion Institute of Technology (FIT), a college in the State University of New York system. Peek was awarded the statuette of a spool of thread award by FIT's Couture Council in February 2013. She chairs the fundraising organization for The Museum at FIT and is a member of the board of the FIT Foundation.

== Personal life ==
Liz Peek married her husband Jeff Peek in 1972. He is the former CEO of CIT Group. The couple has three children. Their son, Andrew Peek, studied at Princeton, Harvard, Johns Hopkins and the University of Texas at Austin, is a veteran of the US Army, and has worked for the Heritage Foundation and for two Republican US Senators and one Republican Congressman. He briefly served in each of the Trump administrations; as part of the State Department during Trump's first term, and as an advisor at the NSC during Trump's second term.

Liz Peek's father, Robert Lewis Taylor, was a Pulitzer Prize-winning writer. He died in 1998.
