= Salmon Tower Building =

Office skyscraper in Manhattan, New York

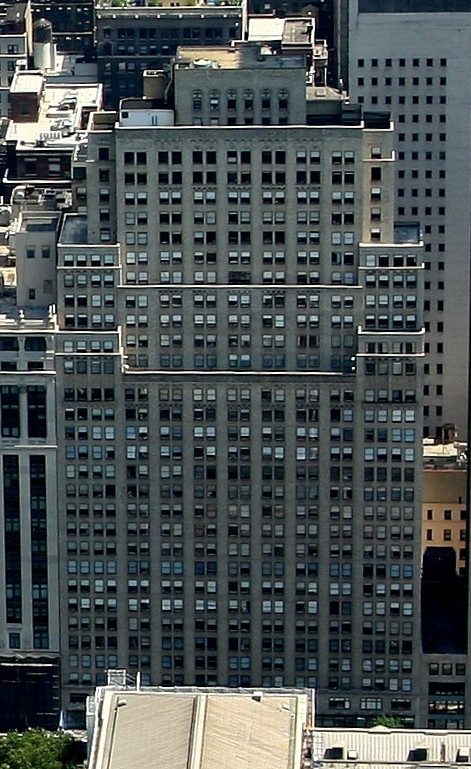
- Viewed from the Empire State Building, 2008
- Interactive map of the Salmon Tower Building area

General information
- Type: Commercial
- Location: 11 West 42nd Street, Manhattan, New York
- Coordinates: 40.75416°N 73.98194°W
- Completed: 1928
- Owner: Tishman Speyer, Silverstein Properties

Height
- Roof: 370 feet (110 m)

Technical details
- Floor count: 31
- Floor area: 932,101 square feet (86,595.0 m^{2})

Design and construction
- Architects: York & Sawyer
- Developer: Walter J. Salmon Sr.

The Salmon Tower Building is a 31-story skyscraper located at 11 West 42nd Street and 20 West 43rd Street in Manhattan, New York City, near Bryant Park. It was designed by Albert J. Wilcox and finished in 1928. It was developed by a firm headed by Walter J. Salmon Sr. Directly to the west of the Salmon Tower Building is the former Aeolian Building, and to its east is 500 Fifth Avenue, also built by Salmon Sr.

== History ==
Walter J. Salmon Sr. headed a firm to erected the building, known as 11 West 42nd Street, Inc. It was designed by Albert J. Wilcox. The Salmon Tower Building was completed by early 1928, when its interior was more than 50 percent leased. The New York City headquarters to elect Herbert Hoover as U.S. president in 1928 were located in the Salmon Tower Building.

In September 1941, elevator operators in the building went on strike so only four of its eighteen elevators were operating on the morning of September 25. In October 1952 a fire in the structure's subbasement caused five firemen to be overcome from smoke inhalation.

Salmon Tower Building was sold by the estate of Charles Frederick Hoffman in June 1964, following an ownership of over sixty years. At the time its assessed value was $5.25 million and it was situated on a 34,309-square-foot (3,187.4 m^{2}) land lot. It is currently owned by Tishman Speyer & Silverstein Properties. In 1980 Tishman Speyer & Silverstein Properties collaborated on a $25 million renovation. The building was refinanced in July 2023 with a $330 million loan from a syndicate led by Bank of America.

== Tenants ==
- Future plc
- CIT Group
- Kohn Pedersen Fox
- NPR
- Michael Kors
- Springer Publishing Company
- TV Guide, occupies part of The New Yorker's space
- New York University School of Professional Studies, also known as the "NYU Midtown Center", on the 4th, 5th, and 10th floors

=== Former tenants ===
The offices of The New Yorker magazine were moved to the building from its longtime home at 25 West 43rd Street, just to the north, in 1991. The magazine moved to 4 Times Square in 1999.
