= John Thain =

American businessman

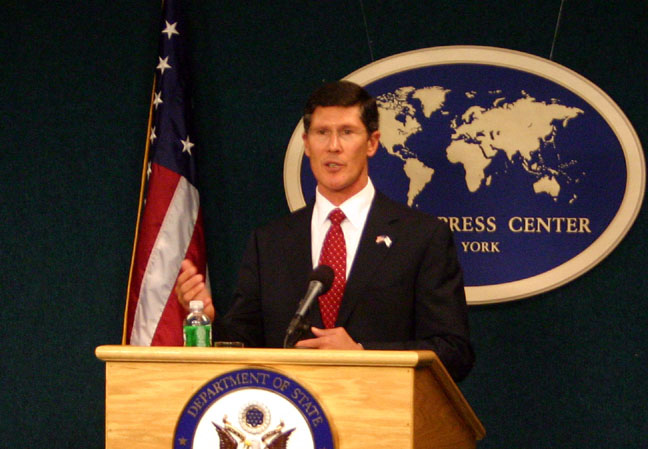
- Born: John Alexander Thain; May 26, 1955 (age 71); Antioch, Illinois, U.S.
- Education: Massachusetts Institute of Technology (BS); Harvard University (MBA)
- Occupations: Financial executive, investment banker
- Political party: Republican

John Alexander Thain (born May 26, 1955) is an American financial executive and investment banker. He was president and co-COO of Goldman Sachs, and then CEO of the New York Stock Exchange. Thain then became the last chairman and CEO of Merrill Lynch before its merger with Bank of America during the 2008 financial crisis. He was designated to become president of global banking, securities, and wealth management at the newly combined company, but resigned in January 2009. Ken Lewis, CEO of Bank of America, reportedly forced Thain to step down after several controversies, such as the losses at Merrill Lynch which proved to be far larger than previously estimated, and the award of huge executive bonuses. Thain then was chairman and CEO of the CIT Group. He has been a member of the board of directors of Uber since September 2017.

== Early life ==
Thain was born in Antioch, Illinois. He is of Greek descent through his mother, Sophia "Sophey" (née Lazaraton) Thain. His father, Alan, was a doctor.

Thain earned a bachelor's degree in electrical engineering from the Massachusetts Institute of Technology in 1977 and an MBA from Harvard Business School in 1979. At MIT, Thain was a member of the Delta Upsilon fraternity.

== Career ==
Thain worked at Goldman Sachs, as head of its mortgage securities division from 1985 to 1990, and president and co-chief operating officer from 1999 to 2004.

After leaving Goldman Sachs, Thain was CEO of the New York Stock Exchange from January 2004 to December 2007. In December 2003, interim chairman John Reed at the New York Stock Exchange told The Wall Street Journal that Thain would be paid "a plain vanilla number", about $4 million a year including bonuses, with no "strange retirement" program like the one former NYSE CEO Richard Grasso was given.

Merrill and Citigroup sought new leaders following the sudden departure of their former CEOs after the disappointing performance in the third quarter of 2007 due to the subprime mortgage crisis; Thain was a possible replacement at either. Nelson Chai, the CFO of the New York Stock Exchange under Thain, followed his mentor to Merrill Lynch and assumed the same role as CFO.

Thain arranged the sale of Merrill to Bank of America in a $50 billion transaction, a 70% premium over the market price. Thain was expected to be president of global banking, securities and wealth management, a new division at Bank of America, to oversee its corporate and investment bank and most of wealth management business.

Upon joining Merrill, Thain received a $15 million signing bonus. Thain was to receive at least $50 million a year and could be paid as much as $120 million a year, based on the company's stock price. Thain was the highest paid CEO in 2007, with total compensation of $83.1 million.

Thain suggested to the directors that he receive a bonus in 2008 of as much as $10 million, because he "saved Merrill" by selling it to Bank of America. After the compensation committee at Merrill refused the request, Thain dropped it in December 2008.

It was revealed in January 2009, that Thain spent $1.22 million of corporate funds in early 2008 to renovate two conference rooms, a reception area, and his office, spending $131,000 for area rugs, $68,000 for an antique credenza, $87,000 for guest chairs, $35,115 for a gold-plated commode on legs, and $1,100 for a wastebasket. Thain subsequently apologized for his lapse in judgment, and reimbursed the company in full for the costs.

Thain accelerated approximately $4 billion in bonus payments to employees at Merrill just prior to the close of the deal with Bank of America. Bank of America was aware of the payment, as allowing the payment to go through was reportedly one of the conditions under the merger agreement. Speculation mounted that some of TARP fund was used for the bonus payment, but TARP recipients were not required to disclose how the funds were to be segregated or for how they were to be used.

Sheila Bair, chair of the FDIC, reported that during a meeting with the Treasury secretary at the depth of the financial panic, Thain asked the secretary if the TARP program would impact his compensation.

In January 2009, Bank of America announced that Merrill suffered a loss of $15 billion for the fourth quarter of 2008. Bank of America CEO Ken Lewis said that, without $138 billion in government assistance, including the infusion of $20 billion from the federal government, he would have pulled out of the Merrill deal, which had been approved by Bank of America shareholders in early December. People close to Lewis say his relationship with Thain was strained by Merrill's massive fourth quarter loss. Lewis himself faced criticism for rushing to buy Merrill for $28 billion after less than two days of due diligence.

The tension between Thain and Lewis had been building since mid-December and culminated in January 2009, when Lewis flew to New York to meet with Thain. After a 15-minute conversation between the two men, Thain agreed to resign. Nelson Chai, Merrill's last CFO prior to its merger, was initially slated to relocate to Hong Kong to head Bank of America's Asia business, but Chai, a "Thain ally", departed from Bank of America in February, just two weeks after the ouster of Thain, and was replaced by Ki-Myung Hong. Thain and Chai's departures left just one other member of Merrill's management team at the combined company, Tom Montag, as head of sales and trading.

In January 2009, President Obama publicly criticized the large bonuses such as those handed out by Thain. Vice President Joe Biden also criticized the bonuses. New York Attorney General Andrew Cuomo issued a subpoena to Thain in a probe into the bonuses he received just days before the Bank of America takeover.

In February 2010, CIT Group hired Thain to replace interim CEO Peter Tobin. In 2013, CIT paid him $8.25 million.

Thain retired effective March 2016 and was replaced by Ellen Alemany.

== Memberships ==
Thain is a member of the following organizations:

- MIT Sloan School of Management – North American Executive Board
- The New York Botanical Garden – Board of Managers, Investment Committee. Thain and his wife, Carmen, are both active members of the NYBG Board. Their philanthropy includes helping the Garden restore and preserve its 50-acre old-growth Thain Family Forest.
- INSEAD – U.S. National Advisory Board
- James Madison Council of the Library of Congress
- Federal Reserve Bank of New York's International Capital Markets Advisory Committee
- French-American Foundation
- Board of Trustees of the National Urban League
- The Trilateral Commission
- Yale University – John and Carmen Thain established the "Thain Family Café", which is part of the Yale University Anne T. and Robert M. Bass Library. The Café offers refreshments prepared with organic and local ingredients, secured through the Yale Sustainable Food Project. At the dedication of the Library in November 2007, Thain spoke warmly of Yale's attention to its undergraduates (his daughter attended the university) and stated, "This was a way for us to give back and contribute to the student experience."
- New York-Presbyterian Hospital Board of Trustees of since 2000
- Republican Party – Thain is a prominent member of the party and was a personal friend of Senator John McCain. Thain was a senior economic policy adviser to McCain and was considered a leading candidate to be his Treasury Secretary. In support of McCain's unsuccessful 2008 bid for the presidency, Thain sponsored a number of fundraisers, including a $2,300-a-seat breakfast at The Regency Hotel on Park Avenue on December 14, 2007.

== Personal life ==
Thain is active in social work and was gala co-chair for a Publicolor event in New York City that honored Rick Segal, Publicolor's former board chair.

Thain and his wife have two daughters and two sons. Thain's property of 25 acres (10 ha) in New York State spans three townships, Rye, Harrison, and Rye Brook. Thain has a house on North Captiva Island in south west Florida.

In 2006, he purchased an apartment at 740 Park Avenue for $27.5 million. He renovated it and sold it for $28 million in 2024.

=== Political contributions ===
In 2015, Thain contributed $205,000 to the pro-Jeb Bush Super PAC Right to Rise. The only other political contribution he made in 2015 was $5,400 to Rob Portman. In the past Thain has contributed significant amounts of money to both Democratic and Republican candidates.
