= 500 Fifth Avenue =

Office skyscraper in Manhattan, New York

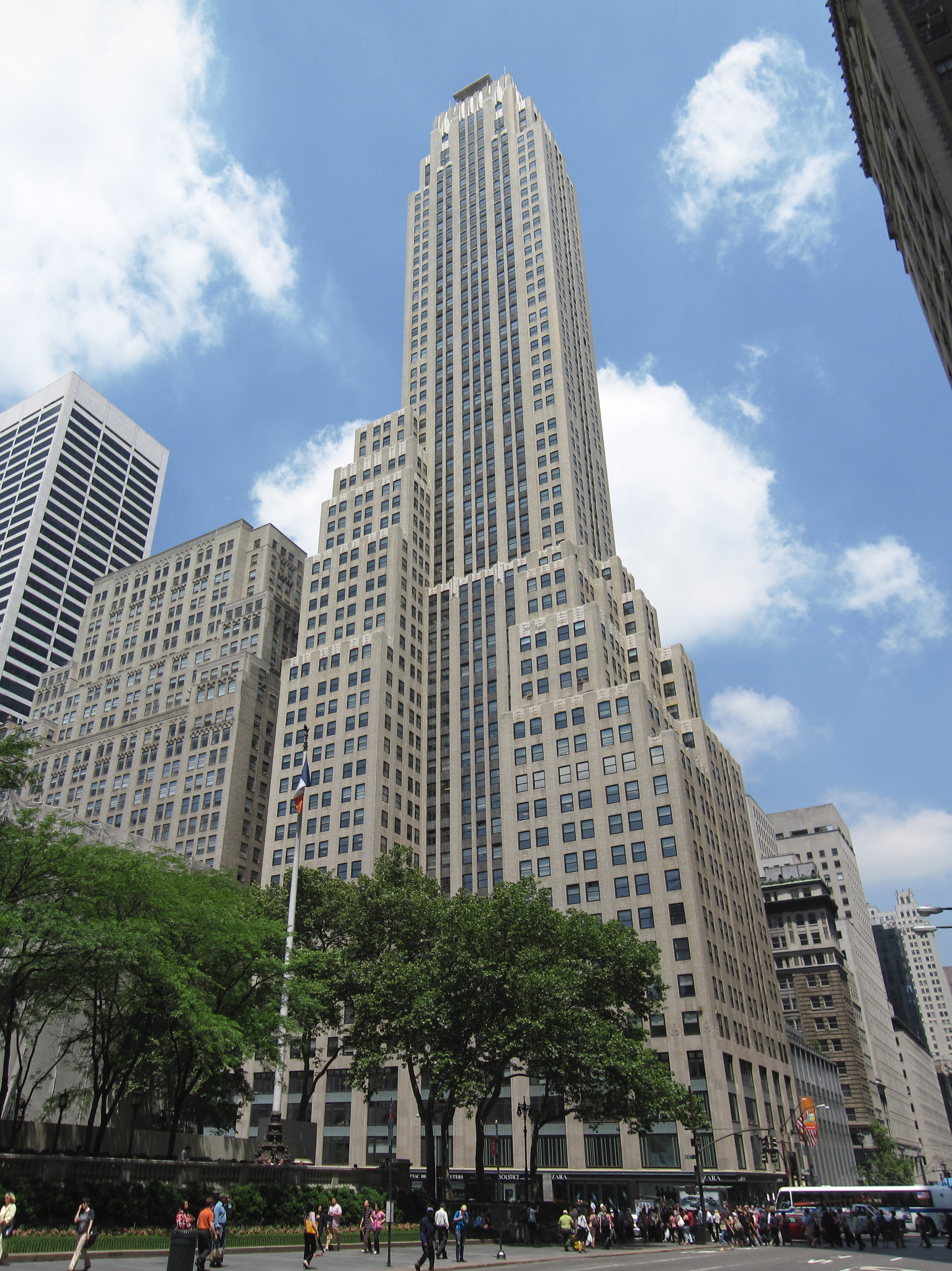
- Interactive map of the 500 Fifth Avenue area

General information
- Type: Office
- Architectural style: Art Deco
- Location: Fifth Avenue and 42nd Street, Manhattan, New York, U.S.
- Coordinates: 40°45′14″N 73°58′53″W
- Construction started: 1929; 97 years ago
- Completed: 1931; 95 years ago
- Opening: March 3, 1931; 95 years ago
- Cost: $4 million (equivalent to $66,216,000 in 2024)
- Owner: 1472 Broadway, Inc.

Height
- Roof: 697 feet (212 m)

Technical details
- Floor count: 60
- Floor area: 659,122 ft^{2} (61,234.4 m^{2})

Design and construction
- Architect: Shreve, Lamb & Harmon
- Developer: Walter J. Salmon Sr.
- Structural engineer: McClintic-Marshall Co.
- Main contractor: Charles T. Wills Inc.

New York City Landmark
- Designated: December 14, 2010
- Reference no.: 2427

500 Fifth Avenue is a 60-story, 697-foot-tall (212 m) office building on the northwest corner of Fifth Avenue and 42nd Street in the Midtown Manhattan neighborhood of New York City, New York, United States. The building was designed by Shreve, Lamb & Harmon in the Art Deco style and constructed from 1929 to 1931.

500 Fifth Avenue was designed with a facade of bronze, limestone, and terracotta at the base; it is clad with brick above the fourth floor. While the lowest four floors contain a decorative exterior, little ornamentation is used above the base. The primary entrance is on Fifth Avenue, and storefronts are located at ground level. Upon its opening, the building contained design features including fast elevators, well-lit office units, and a floor plan that maximized the well-lit office space. The 1916 Zoning Resolution resulted in a structure that incorporated setbacks, resulting in the lower floors being larger than the upper floors.

500 Fifth Avenue was built for businessman Walter J. Salmon Sr. In the 1920s, prior to the building's development, the underlying land had become extremely valuable. Similarly to the much larger Empire State Building nine blocks south, which was constructed simultaneously, 500 Fifth Avenue's construction was highly coordinated. 500 Fifth Avenue opened in March 1931, but the structure garnered relatively little attention after the Empire State Building opened shortly afterward. The building was designated an official city landmark by the New York City Landmarks Preservation Commission in 2010.

== Site ==
500 Fifth Avenue occupies the northwestern corner of Fifth Avenue and 42nd Street in the Midtown Manhattan neighborhood of New York City, New York, United States. It is adjacent to the Manufacturers Trust Company Building to the north and the Salmon Tower Building to the west, while Bryant Park and the New York Public Library Main Branch are across 42nd Street to the south. 500 Fifth Avenue occupies a land lot with frontage of 100 feet (30 m) along Fifth Avenue to the east and 283 feet (86 m) along 42nd Street to the south. It has a total lot area of 20,920 square feet (1,944 m^{2}). The building is assigned its own ZIP Code, 10110; it was one of 41 buildings in Manhattan that had their own ZIP Codes as of 2019.

Mansions and other residences were constructed on Fifth Avenue in the late 19th century, and office and commercial buildings were being developed on the avenue by the beginning of the 20th century. By 1923, the Rider's Guide to New York City referred to the blocks of East 42nd Street between Park and Fifth Avenues as "Little Wall Street". The Real Estate Record & Guide called the area "the most valuable building site on Manhattan Island north of Wall Street".

== Architecture ==
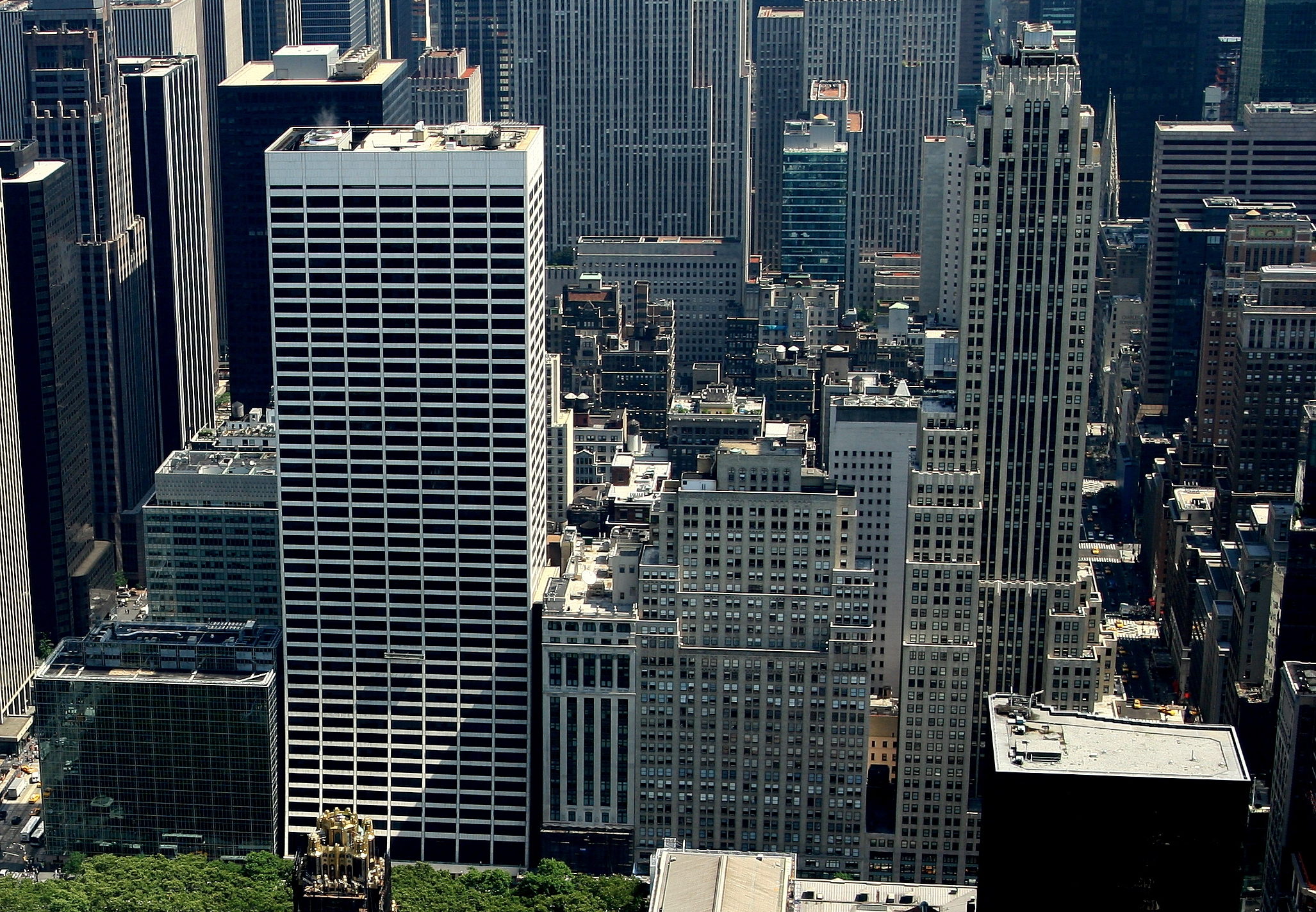
From left to right: Former HBO headquarters, W. R. Grace Building, Aeolian Hall (houses the State University of New York College of Optometry), Salmon Tower Building and 500 Fifth Avenue (annotated image on Wikimedia Commons)

Shreve, Lamb & Harmon designed the building in the Art Deco style. It was built simultaneously with the Empire State Building nine blocks south, which Shreve, Lamb & Harmon also designed. William F. Lamb, a lead associate at the firm, called 500 Fifth Avenue "a thoroughly frank expression of the requirements of an up-to-date office building." Because the design lacks historicist details, writer Eric Nash described the building as "perhaps the closest realization" of Eliel Saarinen's unrealized design for Chicago's Tribune Tower.

=== Form ===
Because of limitations on building shape imposed by the 1916 Zoning Resolution, the building contains setbacks that make the lower floors larger than the upper floors. Varying designs were used on Fifth Avenue and on 42nd Street due to the different zoning requirements on each side. 500 Fifth includes numerous setbacks on each side, which are complex and asymmetrical. The first setback on 42nd Street is at a higher story than the first setback on Fifth Avenue. Namely, the Fifth Avenue side's setbacks are at the 18th, 22nd, and 25th stories, while the 42nd Street side's setbacks are at the 23rd, 28th, and 34th stories. The AIA Guide to New York City characterized the form as "a phallic pivot".

At the time of 500 Fifth Avenue's completion in 1931, the heights of skyscrapers in New York City were limited by the perceived economic feasibility of the upper floors. For the lot that 500 Fifth Avenue occupied, this maximum height was considered to be 59 stories including a penthouse, or roughly 697 feet (212 m). Despite being similar in design to the Empire State Building, 500 Fifth Avenue never became as prominent due to its asymmetrical massing, its lack of spire, and its smaller proportions. The only original ornamentation on 500 Fifth Avenue's roof were large red digits reading "500", but these have since been removed.

=== Facade ===
The building's primary entrance is on Fifth Avenue about 70 feet (21 m) north of 42nd Street. Storefronts are located at ground level on the eastern and southern elevations. As a result of the creation of a special Fifth Avenue zoning district in 1929, new buildings on the avenue within Midtown had to include stores on their first two floors. The main entrance is flanked by triple-story pylons. Above the entrance is an allegorical limestone relief depicting the building's construction, which was carved by Edward Amateis. This relief depicts a gilded woman next to a model of the building, with a staff in her hand. Ornamentation depicting a pair of carved eagles is placed on the 42nd Street facade.

Lamb cited several factors in the "modern architectural treatment" of 500 Fifth, including the ornamentation and material usage. Bronze, limestone, and terracotta were used on the base's facade. The second through fourth floors contained decorated limestone piers as well as light-green spandrels ornamented with chevrons and folds. There were also shallow reliefs with depictions of fountains and foliation.

Above the fourth floor, the exterior was made mainly of brick. The facade above the fourth floor consisted of recessed brick spandrels with black terracotta panels, which provided "vertical accents" to the building. The idea for the terracotta-and-brick spandrels was probably taken from the Daily News Building, where a similar spandrel design was used. Little ornamentation is used above the base, except for terracotta panels with chevrons. The northern elevation of the facade is a largely uninterrupted brick wall with three vertical strips of black terracotta. In total, the building uses over 3.3 million bricks.

=== Features ===
500 Fifth's design features included "fast and efficient" elevators, well-lit office units, and a floor plan that maximized the well-lit office space. Like the Empire State Building, 500 Fifth was designed from the top down; the floor plans within the upper stories were planned first, followed by the floor plans of the lower stories and the building's base. The main entrance leads to an outer lobby, the design of which was extensively modified after 550 Fifth Avenue's completion. The modern design of the outer lobby consists of pink-gray marble. A pair of griffins hold up a clock in the lobby and is the only historicist decoration in the space. The inner lobby is clad with gold and gray veined marble.

The lowest two floors were designed with storefronts, set back from the full-height plate-glass windows on either side. There was also a 17,000-square-foot (1,600 m^{2}) banking space on the second floor, with space for a private elevator and staircase from Fifth Avenue, as well as a subbasement for a banking vault and storage area.

Offices above the sixth floor were designed so that each unit was a maximum of 30 feet (9.1 m) away from a window or other source of natural light. The area of each floor could be between 2,150 to 18,000 square feet (200 to 1,672 m^{2}). Office sizes ranged from the smallest units being 9 feet (2.7 m) wide to the largest units covering the entire floor; on average, there were 21 units on each floor within the base, and 9 units on each floor within the tower section. According to the New York City Department of City Planning, 500 Fifth Avenue has a gross floor area of 659,122 square feet (61,234.4 m^{2}). Though the floor area is relatively small compared to other buildings of similar height, 500 Fifth Avenue nonetheless has had a high occupancy rate throughout its history.

== History ==
=== Land acquisition ===
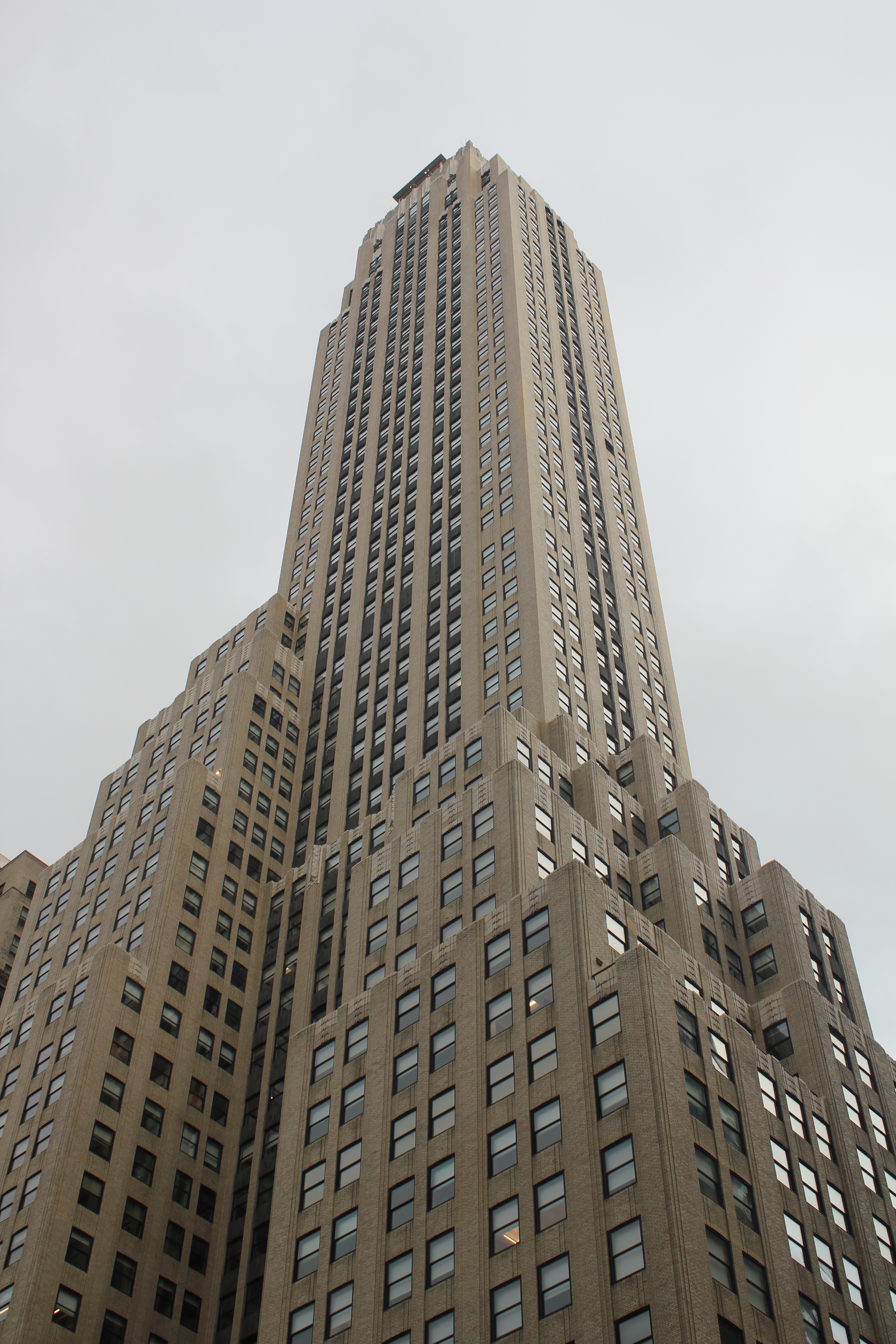
The building as seen from directly across Fifth Avenue and 42nd Street

From the 1890s to the 1910s, entrepreneur Walter J. Salmon purchased or leased several buildings along the northern side of West 42nd Street. His first acquisitions were 19 and 21 West 42nd in 1899 and 1901, respectively. In 1903, he signed a 20-year lease for the lot at the northwest corner of Fifth Avenue and 42nd Street, which was occupied by the Hotel Bristol, an eight-story structure built in 1875. The terms of the lease enabled Salmon to convert the hotel to commercial and office use. In 1905, he leased the brownstone rowhouses at 11–17 West 42nd Street and the six-story building at 27–29 West 42nd Street, and the following year, he acquired the properties at 23–25 West 42nd. When Salmon leased the remaining buildings between 3–9 West 42nd Street in 1915, he controlled 858 feet (262 m) along the northern side of the street between Fifth Avenue and 29 West 42nd. His parcels totaled 50,900 square feet (4,730 m^{2}), which was considered to be the "minimum size necessary for profitable redevelopment".

Salmon's company, the Midpoint Realty Company, made an agreement with the site's owners, Gerry Estates Inc., for the corner lot's redevelopment in January 1922. Salmon signed a long-term lease for both the Bristol Building and the buildings at 3–9 West 42nd Street. In 1927, Salmon leased a four-story residence at 508 Fifth Avenue for his corner-lot development. The adjacent lots at 11–27 West 42nd would become the Salmon Tower Building, which was completed in 1928. However, the development of the corner site was delayed because of a legal dispute between Salmon and wool merchant Morton Meinhard, who was to provide half of the money for the site's development but did not have any say in the 1922 lease. The New York Supreme Court's Appellate Division ruled in June 1929 that Meinhard was entitled to a half-stake in the site.

=== Planning and construction ===
In July 1929, Salmon announced his plans for the corner lot, a 58-story building at 500 Fifth Avenue, measuring 100 feet (30 m) along Fifth Avenue and 208 feet (63 m) along 42nd Street. The skyscraper was estimated to cost $2.35 million (equivalent to $33,700,000 in 2024) and be completed in late 1930. The Real Estate Record wrote that "the time appeared ripe for an improvement on this corner". The lot was considered the second-most-valuable undeveloped lot in Manhattan, behind 1 Wall Street. To finance construction, the developer issued $7 million worth of sinking fund bonds, equivalent to $100,384,000 in 2024.

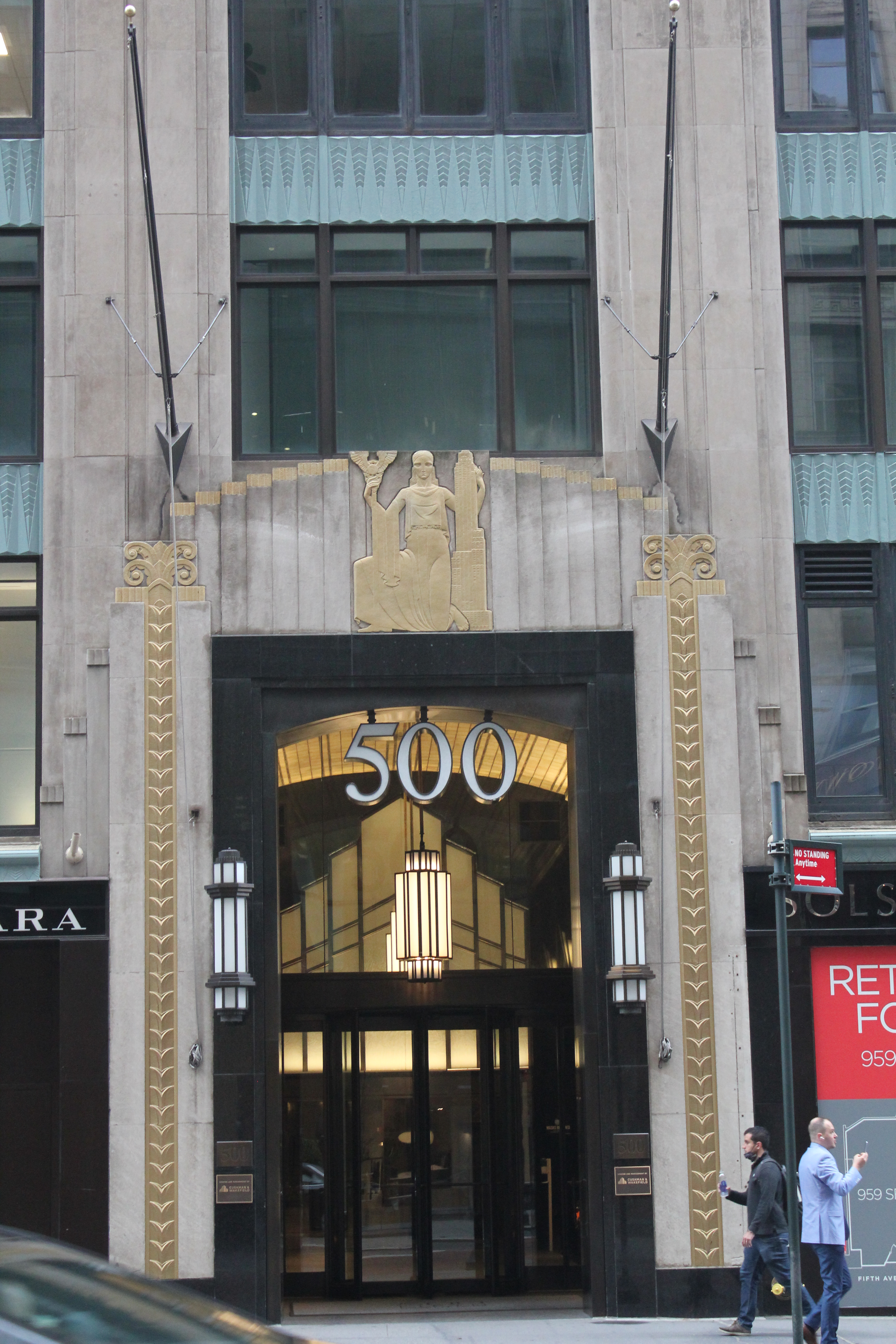
Main entrance on Fifth Avenue

Shreve, Lamb & Harmon were selected to design the new building. Because the zoning ordinances allowed higher buildings along 42nd Street than Fifth Avenue, Salmon merged the zoning lots of 500 and 508 Fifth Avenue, enabling him to construct a taller building than was usually permitted. This also required a separate design for the Fifth Avenue side of the building. Some 450,000 to 500,000 square feet (42,000 to 46,000 m^{2}) of rentable office space would be provided, as well as space for banking on the second and third floors, and retail on the first floor. The plans called for numerous architectural features including setbacks and "light courts". The New York City Department of Buildings received plans for 500 Fifth Avenue in October 1929. The following month, the Bristol Building's tenants were evicted, and that December the Bristol Building was demolished. The site was cleared in January 1930 and excavation of the foundation began the next month.

Similar to the Empire State Building nine blocks south, which was being constructed simultaneously by Shreve, Lamb & Harmon, each structural component at 500 Fifth Avenue was planned in advance. According to architect Richmond Shreve, a lead associate at the firm, the former's construction "required feats of organization in some respects never before attempted." 500 Fifth Avenue was erected by general contractor Charles T. Wills Inc. and steel contractor McClintic-Marshall Co. Assembly of the steel frame commenced in March 1930 and, with a system of derricks being used to expedite construction, the frame was topped out by that July. The building thus became the tallest skyscraper on Fifth Avenue for less than a month, as the Empire State Building subsequently surpassed it. Installation of the brickwork commenced in April 1930, concurrently with the steel frame's construction, and was completed by that September. By the end of the year, the building was essentially complete. The construction process employed up to 2,200 workers, and ultimately cost $4 million (equivalent to $66,216,000 in 2024).

=== Use ===
==== 20th century ====
500 Fifth Avenue officially opened on March 3, 1931. John Tauranac, in his book The Empire State Building: The Making of a Landmark, wrote that upon 500 Fifth's completion, "The Building Record and Guide was calling Forty-second Street and Fifth Avenue 'the best known corner in the world'." In its early years, 500 Fifth Avenue was largely overlooked in the real estate community, as more attention was placed upon the Empire State Building, the world's tallest building at the time. Furthermore, office rental activity was affected by the Wall Street Crash of 1929. Conversely, at the beginning of 1931, Fifth Avenue was experiencing high demand for storefront space, with only 12 of 224 stores being unoccupied. 500 Fifth Avenue, along with 608 Fifth Avenue and the Empire State Building, were expected to add a combined 11 stores. Despite other developers' speculation that Salmon would construct a three-story residence at the roof, Salmon said the corner was "just a little too prominent for real home life".

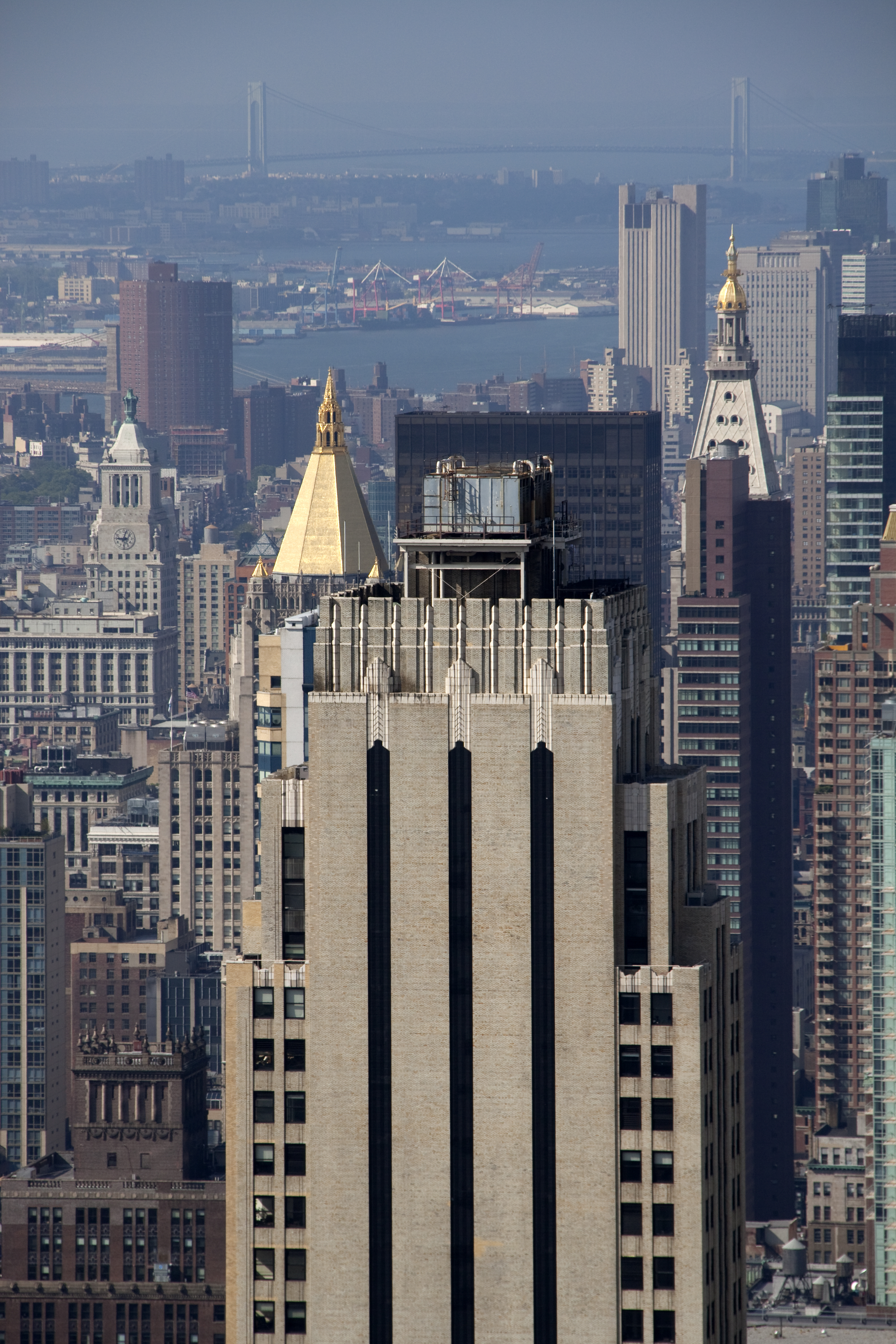
Tower portion of the building, showing the black terracotta panels on the spandrels

Salmon had said in December 1930 that, although he foresaw it might take a long time to fill the space at 500 Fifth Avenue, "the enterprise was undertaken with the greatest faith in the future of midtown expansion and development." The 15th, 16th, and 20th floors were completely rented by May 1931. Rental activity continued and, by the end of the year, lessees included Electrolux, Western Universities Club, and several railroad companies. Other tenants in the mid-1930s included the Austrian and Japanese consulates; the Austrian consulate closed in 1938, when the country was taken over by Nazi Germany, and the Japanese consulate moved the following year to the International Building at Rockefeller Center. 500 Fifth Avenue was the original transmitter site for CBS Radio's New York City FM station (W67NY, later called WCBS-FM) in 1941.

The Mutual Insurance Company leased the adjacent lots at 508–514 Fifth Avenue from the Manufacturers Hanover Corporation (then known as the Manufacturers Trust Company) in 1944. Because Salmon's existing lease of 508 Fifth Avenue ran through 1965, Manufacturers Trust subleased the lot at 508 Fifth Avenue from Salmon. The terms of the sublease specified that the portion of any structure at 508 Fifth Avenue could not be more than 63 feet (19 m) tall, or obstruct the adjacent skyscraper in any other way. (Note: The height restriction only applied to the land lot at 508 Fifth Avenue, and only ran until the end of Salmon's lease in 1965. Structures on the lots at 510–514 Fifth Avenue could be erected taller than that. The New York City Landmarks Preservation Commission also cites a figure of 68 feet (21 m) for the height restriction.) The Manufacturers Trust Company Building at 508–514 Fifth Avenue was completed in 1954, and ultimately contained four stories and a penthouse. The Manufacturers Trust penthouse was set back from the lot line at 508 Fifth Avenue because it rose above the maximum height permitted in the sublease agreement.

The land under 500 Fifth Avenue was owned separately from the building itself and, in 1955, the land was sold to Metropolitan Life Insurance, now known as MetLife. The New York Reading Laboratory, a reading room in the basement, operated during that decade. In 1980, a Yugoslavian bank on the 30th floor was bombed, with Croatian nationalists claiming responsibility, though no one was hurt and the structure suffered minimal damage. The facade was restored in the 1990s, and a Mexican investment group paid $132 million for 500 Fifth Avenue in 1996.

==== 21st century ====
Through the 21st century, 500 Fifth Avenue continued to be used as an office building. The LPC designated the building's facade as a landmark on December 14, 2010. The building was renovated in 2012 and was more than 80 percent occupied by early 2024. The $200 million mortgage loan on the building had gone into special servicing by July 2024, and its owner Moises Cosío Espinosa was unable to refinance the building, even though it had a 20% vacancy rate. By early 2025, Cosío was forced to decide whether to transfer the building to the mortgage holders; although the building was centrally located, it was hard to attract tenants because nearly one-fourth of Manhattan's office space was vacant at the time. He ultimately decided to keep it that June, paying his lenders $10 million in exchange for a two-year extension of his loan.

== See also ==
- Art Deco architecture of New York City
- List of New York City Designated Landmarks in Manhattan from 14th to 59th Streets
- List of tallest buildings in New York City
