= Gerald Putnam =

American businessman

Gerald Putnam is an American businessman. He started Archipelago Holdings, an electronic communication network, in 1999. In 2006; it was acquired by the NYSE for almost $3 billion. Putnam was selected as one of the innovators of 21st century by Time magazine.

ArcaEx, Putnams' company, was built to instantly look at the Arca exchange for best prices and if not matched then to route to the bourse that displayed the best price.

When Putnam headed Arca's purchase of the Pacific Stock Exchange, he created the first ECN that was also a stock exchange. He also took Arca into options trading. John Thain, a perennial deal maker, did his first major deal since taking the helm at the NYSE when he merged with Arca.

This merger caused the 212-year-old (at time of merger) NYSE to demutualize and make an initial public offering. NYSE seatholders were each given roughly 80,000 shares of NYX in exchange for their now-obsolete NYSE seats. Shortly after the IPO the members-only luncheon club and barber shop and 20% of the old-fashioned trading floor were closed.

The newly established public NYSE soon merged with Euronext to form NYSE Euronext.

The company declared its first dividend in June 2007. Putnam was promoted to Vice Chairman and given additional responsibility overseeing SIAC. In August 2007, Putnam announced that he would leave his managerial duties with the NYX and remain involved as a consultant with an office in Chicago.

In February 2011 Putnam moved from his position on the board to the acting CEO of Trumarx Data Partners in Chicago. TruMarx Data Partners developed and currently operates COMET. COMET is the community of energy transactors. Which is an ECN networking site connecting large bilateral non-standard over the counter transaction of natural gas and power transactors.
