= Walter J. Salmon Sr. =

American real estate investor

- Born: Walter J. Salomon; May 25, 1871
- Died: December 25, 1953 (aged 82); New York City, US
- Resting place: Locust Valley Cemetery, Locust Valley, New York
- Occupation: Real Estate Investor/Developer
- Known for: 500 Fifth Avenue, Salmon Tower Building, Mereworth Farm
- Spouse(s): 1) Elsie A. May (1884-1907); 2) Lois May (1887-1916); 3) Elizabeth J. Davy
- Children: Walter Jr., Burton, Lois
- Relatives: Ferdinand S. Salmon (brother)

Walter Joseph Salmon Sr. (1871 – December 25, 1953) was a New York City real estate investor and developer. According to the New York City Landmarks Preservation Commission, Salmon was "responsible for rebuilding the north side of West 42nd Street between Fifth and Sixth Avenues in the first decades of the 20th century". As well, Salmon was a major figure in the business of Thoroughbred horse racing whom The Blood-Horse magazine called "one of the leading breeder/owners of the 20th century."

Born Walter J. Salomon, in his adult years he changed the spelling of his surname to Salmon. On September 3, 1906, he married Elsie A. May. A son, Walter J. Salmon Jr., was born on June 14, 1907, but twenty-three-year-old Elsie May Salomon died fifteen days later. Walter Salmon then married Elsie's younger sister Lois, who would die on March 1, 1916, aged twenty-eight. Just prior to his marriage to Elizabeth J. Davy of Rochester, New York, in early 1919 Salmon was elected President of the New Symphony Orchestra.

== Real estate ==
Walter Salmon built and owned a number of valuable properties in New York City including the 31-story Salmon Tower Building. In a 1941 deal, described by The New York Times as "One of the largest of sales in the midtown section of Manhattan", Walter Salmon sold the building on the northwest corner of 42nd Street and Sixth Avenue and another on the southwest corner of 49th Street and Broadway. According to the New York City Landmarks Preservation Commission, Walter Salmon's crowning achievement was the construction of 500 Fifth Avenue, at the corner of 42nd Street and Fifth Avenue, which was made a New York City Designated Landmark in 2010.

Of importance in the business world, Meinhard v. Salmon, 164 N.E. 545 (N.Y. 1928), is a widely cited case in which the New York Court of Appeals held that partners in a business owe fiduciary duties to one another where a business opportunities arises during the course of the partnership.

== Mereworth Farm ==
Walter Salmon Sr. had been involved in the sport of Thoroughbred racing for a few years when he began to win consistently after he signed Eugene Wayland as his trainer in 1918. The following year he decided to also breed Thoroughbreds for himself and established Mereworth Farm, a 1,200-acre property on Yarnallton Pike near Lexington, Kentucky. In 1933 he changed the business into a completely commercial breeding operation, selling all horses each year. In 1946 Mereworth Farm horses won more purse money than any other racing stable in the United States and led the country in races won from 1947 through 1953. Such was his importance to the industry that Walter Salmon's Mereworth Farm was one of those profiled by racing historian Edward L. Bowen in his 2003 book, Legacies of the Turf: A Century of Great Thoroughbred Breeders.

Among his racing successes, Salmon owned Careful who was the American Co-Champion Two-Year-Old Filly of 1920 and the American Champion Older Female Horse of 1922. For 1930, another filly, Snowflake, earned American Co-Champion Three-Year-Old Filly honors. During this decade Walter Salmon won the Preakness Stakes three times with Vigil (1923), Display (1926), and Dr. Freeland (1929). Display would be the most successful horse that Walter Salmon bred and raced. In addition to his Preakness and other top race wins, Display sired the 1935 American Horse of the Year and Hall of Fame inductee, Discovery whom Salmon sold as an unraced two-year-old to Alfred G. Vanderbilt II. Discovery became the maternal grandsire of Hall of Fame inductees Bold Ruler and Native Dancer.

Walter Salmon also bred Sunglow, sire of Hall of Fame inductee Sword Dancer who in turn sired another Hall of Fame inductee, Damascus. In addition, Salmon bred Battleship, the only horse in history to win both the American Grand National and the English Grand National steeplechase races.

Walter Salmon died on December 25, 1953, in New York City. He was buried in the Locust Valley Cemetery at Locust Valley on Long Island.

At the time of his death, Walter Salmon had bred more than 100 stakes winners. His son, Walter Jr., would follow in his father's footsteps both in the real estate business and in Thoroughbred racing and breeding.
