= Vigil II =

American-bred Thoroughbred racehorse

Vigil
- Sire: Jim Gaffney
- Grandsire: Golden Garter
- Dam: Vignola
- Damsire: Solitaire
- Sex: Stallion
- Foaled: 1920
- Country: United States
- Colour: Bay
- Breeder: Arthur B. Hancock
- Owner: Walter J. Salmon, Sr.
- Trainer: Thomas J. Healey

Major wins
- Debut Purse (1922); Terminal Purse (1922); Baldwin Purse (1922) American Classic Race wins: Preakness Stakes (1923)

Vigil (foaled 1920) was an American Thoroughbred racehorse best known for winning the 1923 Preakness Stakes in a performance the Los Angeles Times called "the most brilliant victory in the history of the Preakness."

Bred by Arthur B. Hancock, Vigil was a bay horse sired by the Hopeful Stakes winner Jim Gaffney. His dam, Vignola, was a great-granddaughter of the British mare Thoughtless, whose other descendants included the 2000 Guineas winner Adam's Apple. Vigil was purchased and raced by Walter J. Salmon, Sr. His trainer was future U.S. Racing Hall of Fame inductee, Thomas "T.J." Healey

== 1922 ==
Racing at age two, Vigil won for the first time on July 10, 1922, at Empire City Race Track when he captured the Debut Purse for maidens under jockey James Butwell. He went on to win other minor races including a division of the Baldwin Purse at Saratoga Race Course under jockey Lavelle Ensor.

== 1923 ==
Overshadowed by Rancocas Stable's Champion colt, Zev, Vigil entered 1923 well down the list of important three-year-old prospects. On April 30, 1923, he ran second to H. P. Whitney's filly, Enchantment, in the Carolina Purse at Maryland's Havre de Grace Racetrack.

In the 1923 U.S. Triple Crown series, the Preakness Stakes was run first and Vigil easily defeated Zev to win the May 13 race in a performance the Los Angeles Times called "the most brilliant victory in the history of the Preakness." The great Zev finished in twelfth place, more than twenty-five lengths behind Vigil. Zev was so soundly beaten that his trainer Sam Hildreth decided not to run him in the upcoming May 19 Kentucky Derby. However, Hildreth changed his mind and Zev won the Derby with Vigil finishing third behind runner-up, Martingale.

During the remainder of his three-year-old campaign, Vigil never returned to the form he had shown in the Preakness. Among his significant races, he finished third in the Havre de Grace Handicap and fourth in both the Merchants and Citizens Handicap and the Lawrence Realization Stakes. Vigil returned to race at age four and five with little success.

== Breeding ==
Pedigree of Vigil
| Sire Jim Gaffney bay 1905 | Golden Garter ch. 1888 | Bend Or | Doncaster |
| Sire Jim Gaffney bay 1905 | Golden Garter ch. 1888 | Bend Or | Rouge Rose |
| Sire Jim Gaffney bay 1905 | Golden Garter ch. 1888 | Sanda | Wenlock |
| Sire Jim Gaffney bay 1905 | Golden Garter ch. 1888 | Sanda | Sandal |
| Sire Jim Gaffney bay 1905 | Miss Maxim bay 1893 | Maxim | Musket |
| Sire Jim Gaffney bay 1905 | Miss Maxim bay 1893 | Maxim | Realisation |
| Sire Jim Gaffney bay 1905 | Miss Maxim bay 1893 | Vebtura | Vigil |
| Sire Jim Gaffney bay 1905 | Miss Maxim bay 1893 | Vebtura | Ulrica |
| Dam Vignola ch. 1912 | Solitaire bay 1896 | Ayrshire | Hampton |
| Dam Vignola ch. 1912 | Solitaire bay 1896 | Ayrshire | Atalanta |
| Dam Vignola ch. 1912 | Solitaire bay 1896 | Solesky | Thunder |
| Dam Vignola ch. 1912 | Solitaire bay 1896 | Solesky | Utopia |
| Dam Vignola ch. 1912 | Carnation ch. 1893 | Flambeau | Wildidle |
| Dam Vignola ch. 1912 | Carnation ch. 1893 | Flambeau | Flirt |
| Dam Vignola ch. 1912 | Carnation ch. 1893 | Amalia | Salvator |
| Dam Vignola ch. 1912 | Carnation ch. 1893 | Amalia | Thoughtless |
