= New Hampshire (miniseries) =

- Genre: Documentary
- No. of seasons: 1
- No. of episodes: 7

Production
- Running time: 7–12 minutes
- Production company: HuffPost

Original release
- Release: January 21 – February 23, 2016

New Hampshire is a HuffPost Originals documentary miniseries. It is a seven-part series chronicling the New Hampshire primary of the 2016 U.S. presidential election.

== People featured ==
The series features exclusive content and interviews with numerous politicians, journalists, and voters involved with the primary, including:

- Chris Christie, Republican presidential candidate and New Jersey governor
- Jackie Alemany, CBS News correspondent
- Bill Gardner, New Hampshire Secretary of State
- Lindsey Graham, Republican presidential candidate and U.S. Senator from South Carolina
- Kelly Ayotte, Republican U.S. Senator from New Hampshire
- Jason Freeman, Republican Tracker
- Charlie Pearce, Christie campaign official
- John Kasich, Republican presidential candidate and Ohio governor
- Jeb Bush, Republican presidential candidate and former Florida governor
- Bernie Sanders, Democratic presidential candidate and U.S. Senator from Vermont
- Kriss Belvins, make-up artist
- Christopher Hickey, EMS training officer
- Voters in Recovery; Electra Delano, Jessica Wheeler, Jeff Douley, Dennis Dutra
- Mike Gamanche, District Chief of the Manchester Fire Department
- Michael Leafe, Manchester Fire Department

New Hampshire voters featured include Belinda Phillips, Laura Smith, Mary Donnelly, David Chick (from Vermont)

== Episodes ==
No.	Title	Original release date
1	"What It Takes In The Granite State"	February 21, 2016
As the most compelling race for the White House in memory shifts into high gear, “New Hampshire” provides a firsthand perspective on what's happening on the ground in the nation’s first and most important primary state.
2	"How To Win By Being Yourself"	January 25, 2016
The 2016 presidential candidates who are perceived as being most authentic tend to be the most successful in the first-in-the-nation primary state.
3	"How The Heroin Crisis Is Bleeding Into The Primary"	January 26, 2016
How face-to-face interaction among voters and presidential candidates has brought New Hampshire's debilitating drug epidemic to the forefront of the 2016 campaign.
4	"Not Just For Old, White People"	February 2, 2016
Young people are more engaged in this year’s primary than what the popular image might suggest.
5	"The Primary Is Dead; Long Live The Primary"	February 9, 2016
Amid a 2016 race that has been largely nationalized, the first-in-the-nation primary's relevance and unique style of campaigning have been called into question.
6	"Always First, Sometimes Right"	February 16, 2016
Over the last century, the New Hampshire primary has seen triumphs and missteps that have changed the course of the presidency and American history.
7	"Insiders Out!"	February 23, 2016
In the last installment of the HuffPost Originals series "New Hampshire," we look at why insurgent candidates from both parties triumphed on New Hampshire's Primary Day in 2016.
