= Harris Hancock =

Mathematics professor at the University of Cincinnati

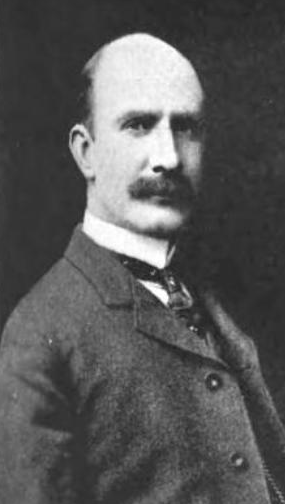
- Born: May 14, 1867; Albemarle County, Virginia
- Died: March 19, 1944 (aged 76); Albemarle County, Virginia
- Education: Johns Hopkins University; University of Berlin; University of Paris
- Spouse: Belle Lyman Clay (m. 1907)
- Scientific career
- Fields: Mathematics
- Workplaces: University of Cincinnati
- Thesis: Ein Form des Additionstheorem für Hyperelliptische Functionen erster Ordnung (1894)
- Doctoral advisor: Lazarus Fuchs; Hermann Schwarz

Harris Hancock (May 14, 1867 – March 19, 1944) was a mathematics professor at the University of Cincinnati who worked on algebraic number theory and related areas. He was the brother of the horse breeder Arthur B. Hancock.

== Biography ==
Harris Hancock was born at his family's estate, Ellerslie, in Albemarle County, Virginia on May 14, 1867. He graduated from the University of Virginia's school of mathematics in 1886. He received an AB from Johns Hopkins University in 1888, an AM and PhD from the University of Berlin in 1894, and an ScD from the University of Paris in 1901.

He married Belle Lyman Clay on September 30, 1907, and they had two children.

Harris Hancock died at Ellerslie on March 19, 1944.

== Publications ==
=== Articles ===
- Hancock, Harris (1918). "Remarks on elliptic integrals". Bulletin of the American Mathematical Society. 24 (10): 487–489. doi:10.1090/S0002-9904-1918-03118-2. ISSN 0002-9904.
- Hancock, Harris (1919). "On the evaluation of the elliptic transcendence $\eta _2$ and $\eta '_2$". Bulletin of the American Mathematical Society. 25 (4): 150–158. doi:10.1090/S0002-9904-1919-03168-1. ISSN 0002-9904.

=== Books ===
- Hancock, Harris (1904), Lectures on the calculus of variations, Cincinnati University Press
- Hancock, Harris (1910), Lectures on the theory of elliptic functions, John Wiley and Sons Reprinted by Dover Publications, Inc., New York 1958
- Hancock, Harris (1917), "Elliptic integrals", Nature, 100 (2513), John Wiley and Sons: 324, Bibcode:1917Natur.100..324G, doi:10.1038/100324a0 Reprinted by Dover Publications, Inc., New York 1958
- Hancock, Harris (1917), Theory of maxima and minima, Ginn, MR 0114884 Reprinted by Dover Publications, Inc., New York 1960
- Hancock, Harris (1931), Foundations of the theory of algebraic numbers, vol. I and II, Macmillan Reprinted by Dover Publications, Inc., New York 1964
- Hancock, Harris (1939), Development of the Minkowski geometry of numbers, Macmillan, ISBN 978-0486446462 Reprinted by Dover Publications, Inc., New York 1964, 2005
