= Ellen Alemany =

American business executive

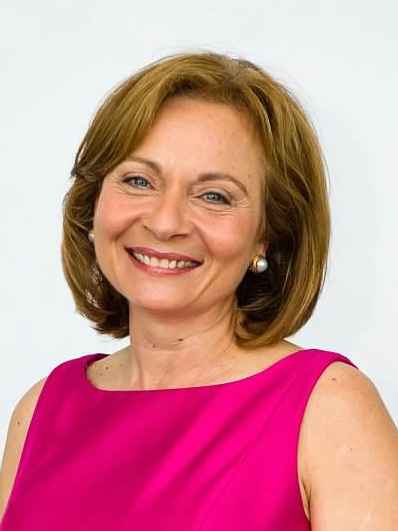
- Born: Ellen Rose Alemany; New York, New York, U.S.
- Education: Academy of Mt. Saint Ursula; University of Bridgeport; Fordham University
- Occupation: Vice Chairwoman of First Citizens BancShares
- Spouse: Joaquin Alemany
- Children: 3, including Jacqueline Alemany
- Relatives: Jake Levine (son-in-law)

Ellen Rose Alemany is an American business executive. She is the Vice Chairwoman of First Citizens BancShares. She was formerly the chairwoman of CIT Group.

In 2020, she was included in a list of "most powerful women in banking" published by American Banker.

== Early life and education ==
Alemany was raised in the Bronx, New York, the daughter of Italian immigrants who operated a liquor store. She graduated with a B.A. in English literature from the University of Bridgeport. After school she took a job in the legal department at IBM and then at Chase Manhattan where she worked in process engineering while attending graduate school in the evenings.

She received an MBA from Fordham University with a specialization in finance in 1980. She completed the Credit Training Program at Chase Manhattan Bank in 1981. She has honorary doctorates from Bryant University and Fordham University.

== Career ==
From 1977 to 1987, Alemany worked at Chase Bank. In 1987, Alemany joined Citibank and held various positions including CEO for Global Transaction Services, executive vice president for the Commercial Business Group, which includes CitiCapital, the Commercial Markets Group and the Commercial Real Estate Group. Alemany joined RBS Americas as chairman and CEO in 2007. In 2008, Alemany was named CEO of RBS Citizens Financial Group, and was appointed chairman and CEO in 2009. She was also a member of the Royal Bank of Scotland Group's executive committee, RBS's nine-member executive leadership team. She also served as CitiCapital president and CEO. In October 2013, she retired as chairman and CEO of RBS Citizens Financial Group and RBS Americas.

She came out of early retirement to become the CEO of CIT Group in April 2016 and became chairwoman in May 2016. Her strategy there was to concentrate on the core activities of the company, and dispose of unprofitable subsidiaries. An increase in the number of female executives in the company has been attributed to her.

In 2020 First Citizens BancShares agreed to buy CIT for $2.2 billion, and offered Alemany a position as vice-chair, with a salary of $1 million and guaranteed bonus of almost $6.9 million per year, conditional on her remaining with the company for two years.

She has been on the board of the Center for Discovery since 2008, of Automatic Data Processing since 2012, of Fidelity National Information Services since 2014, of Operation HOPE since 2015 and of Dun & Bradstreet since 2021. From 2002 to 2010 she was on the board of the New York division of March of Dimes.

She is on the board of Catholic Charities of the Archdiocese of New York and the advisory board of the Mayor's Fund to Advance New York City, and is a trustee of The Conference Board.

== Personal life ==
She is married to Joaquin "Jack" Alemany; they have three children, including Jackie Alemany.

== Awards and honors ==
- 2007 - Alemany named to Treasury and Risk's list of the 100 Most Influential People in Finance (Bankers Redefining Their Role and Watching Their Backs).
- 2009 - Alemany named to Forbes Magazine "One of the World's Most Powerful Women" list.
- 2011 - Recipient of the Foreign Policy Association Corporate Social Responsibility Award.
- 2012 - Connecticut Women's Hall of Fame 2010 Honoree.
- 2013 - American Banker Lifetime Achievement Award. American Banker recognized Alemany's contributions and influence, naming her nine times to its annual list of the 25 Most Powerful Women in Banking.
- 2017 – American Banker Most Powerful Women in Banking (#3)
- 2018 - Alemany was named the winner of the Peter G. Peterson award by the Conference Board's Committee for Economic Development.
- 2018 – American Banker Most Powerful Women in Banking (#3)
- 2019 – Crain's New York Business Notable Women in Banking
- 2019 – Women's Bond Club Merit Award
- 2019 – The Center for Discovery honoree
- 2019 – American Banker Most Powerful Women in Banking (#2)
- 2020 – Darla Moore School of Business Center for Executive Succession Leadership Legacy Award
- 2020 – American Banker Most Powerful Women in Banking
- 2021 – Crain's New York Business Notable Women on Wall Street
