= Ellerslie (Colonial Heights, Virginia) =

Historic house in Virginia, United States

- U.S. National Register of Historic Places
- Virginia Landmarks Register
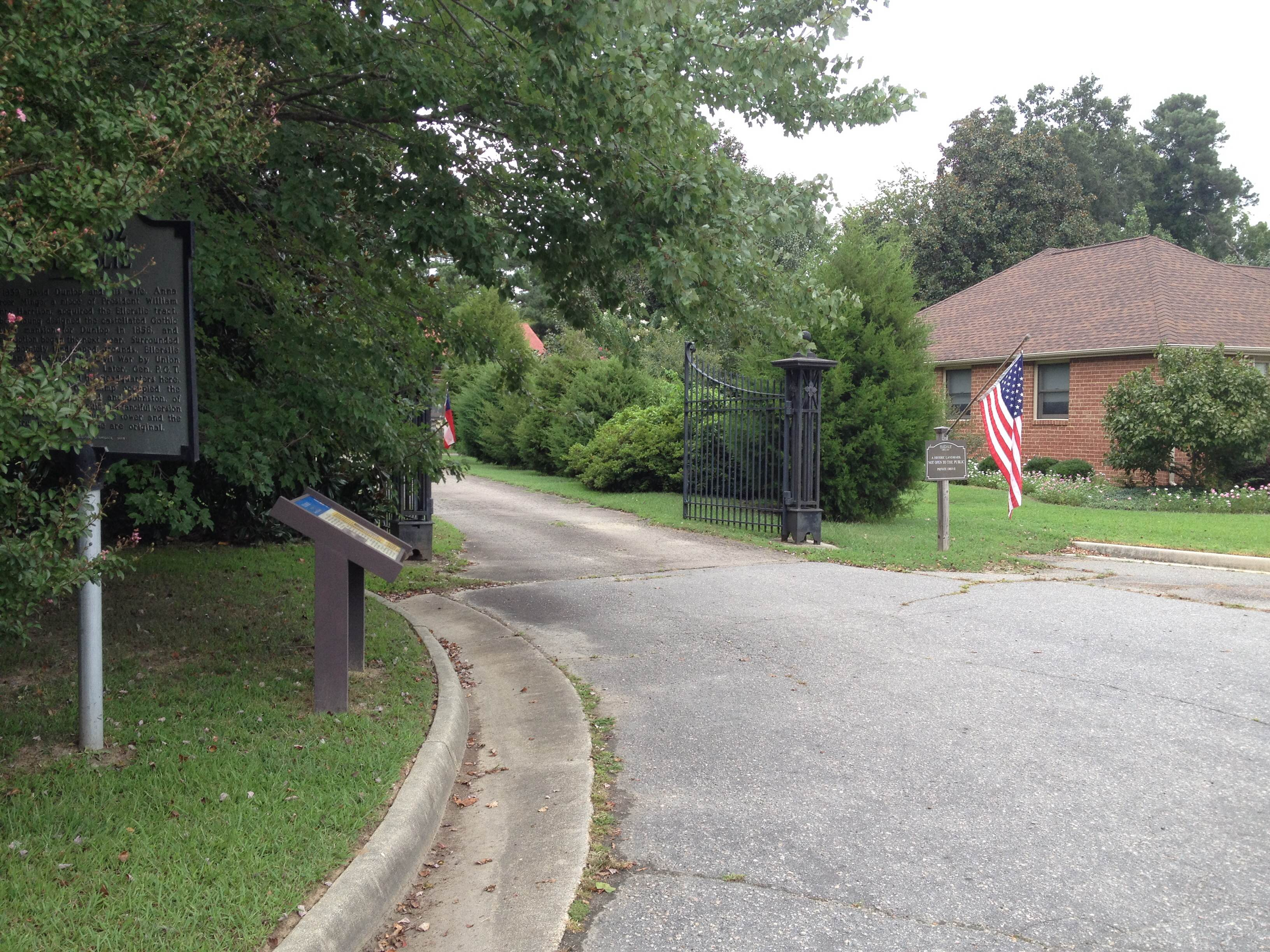
- Front gate to Ellerslie

- Location within Virginia Location within the United States
- Location: Ellerslie Rd., Colonial Heights, Virginia
- Coordinates: 37°14′12″N 77°24′33″W
- Area: 20 acres (8.1 ha)
- Built: 1857
- Built by: Young, Robert
- Architectural style: Italian Villa
- NRHP reference No.: 73002206
- VLR No.: 106-0001

Significant dates
- Added to NRHP: December 4, 1973
- Designated VLR: September 18, 1973

Ellerslie is an historic home located at Colonial Heights, Virginia. It is a large 2 1/2-story, hip-roofed, Italian Villa style dwelling with a two-story rear service wing connected by an arcade. It features a three-story tower with a hipped roof and a full-width front porch.

In 1839, Scottish born Petersburg tobacco magnate David Dunlop and his wife, Anna Mercer Minge, a niece of U.S. President William Henry Harrison, acquired the 200 acre Ellerslie tract along Swift Creek near Petersburg, along the new rail line of the Richmond and Petersburg Railroad Company in Chesterfield County. Dunlop planted tobacco there, eventually more than doubled his land holdings, and constructed Ellerslie, a large plantation house that boasted a mosaic floor and an inner dome with frescoes. On 22 June 1856 Ellerslie was destroyed by fire.

Dunlop engaged the Irish architect Robert Young to design a villa-style mansion to replace the first house. Young, a native of Belfast designed Ellerslie in 1856 as a country house for the wealthy industrialist whose primary residence was in Petersburg. The house featured a flat roof with turrets and a towers and a castellated parapet. The home was elegantly furnished and set amid romantically landscaped grounds.

In 1864, during the American Civil War, Ellerslie stood in the middle of the Confederate line of defense along Swift Creek. On May 9–10, Confederate Gens. Johnson Hagood and Bushrod Johnson, with 4,200 men, contested the advance towards Petersburg of a much larger Federal force, composed of elements of General Benjamin Butler's Army of the James. During the fighting on May 9, a Confederate battery near the house dueled with Federal gunners across the creek at Arrowfield Farm. In addition to being hit by small arms fire, a cannonball struck the house and remained embedded in the wall until the house was remodeled in 1910.

At noon on May 9, the 63rd Tennessee Infantry occupied hastily dug rifle pits around the mansion as part of the Confederate reserve. When Union skirmishers advanced to a fence line about 600 yards from Ellerslie, two Tennessee companies pushed them back. During the night, the Confederates drove a Federal gun from the bank of Swift Creek. The Federals retreated to their camps at Point of Rocks the next morning. Federal operations then shifted toward Richmond and culminated in the Battle of Drewry's Bluff on May 16. Dunlop continued to reside at Ellerslie during the conflict and died there, following a stroke, on May 25, 1864, leaving an estate including his tobacco factory, land and slaves valued at more than $652,000 (equal to over $10 million in 2019). He was buried in Blandford Cemetery, in Petersburg. Dunlop's fine townhouse in Petersburg was severely damaged during the Siege of Petersburg that began shortly after his death.

Confederate General P.G.T. Beauregard established his headquarters at Ellerslie and kept them there intermittently through June. On September 2, Hagood's South Carolina brigade established a rest camp at Ellerslie and remained here until September 28. On the night of April 2, 1865, with the fall of Petersburg imminent, fires illuminated Ellerslie and explosions rocked the house as commissary supplies and munitions were burned at Dunlop's Station nearby on the Richmond & Petersburg Railroad to prevent them from falling into the hands of Federal forces as Jefferson Davis, his Cabinet, and the Confederate defenders abandoned Richmond and fled south. Several civilians were killed in the resulting conflagration.

After Dunlop's death his son David Dunlop II (1841–1902), an 1860 graduate of Washington College inherited Ellerslie. He returned from Europe where he had stayed during the Civil War and established his own tobacco business in Petersburg. On 18 January 1866 he married Kate Compton in Lexington. Before her death in January 1895, they had one son, David Dunlop III. His tobacco business became highly successful and by 1888 was among the top 25 manufacturers in the country. On 4 February 1896 Dunlop married nineteen-year-old Mary "Mollie" Corling Johnston. They had four daughters. In his later years Dunlop's Tobacco business began to struggle against the formidable competition of his main rival, the American Tobacco Company. In 1902 he was forced to reformulate his flagship brand in an attempt to widen its appeal. That summer he suffered a bout of typhoid fever while visiting the New Jersey shore. In the fall he returned to his home in Petersburg, where he died on 26 October 1902. In 1911 his young widow married the wealthy industrialist Archibald M. McCrea, with whom she restored Carter's Grove, an eighteenth-century plantation home near Williamsburg.

In 1910 David Dunlop III, who had inherited Ellerslie upon his father's death 8 years earlier engaged the Richmond architectural firm of Carneal and Johnston to extensively remodel the mansion, in a fanciful version of the Bungaloid style that was then popular, retaining the house's basic structure and tower but replacing the original flat roof and castellated parapet with a hipped roof and dormers. The interior of the house was completely remodeled; none of the original woodwork or interior decoration was retained. The Bungaloid feeling of the exterior was carried into the stair hall. It features a finely crafted exposed joist ceiling, with tongue-and-grooved work between the joists. The rich, dark-wood stair was given square-tapered newells and a balustrade containing mogul-type arches. The reception rooms were restyled with a combination of Louis XVI and Georgian motifs.

Although David Dunlop, III, sold the family tobacco business to the recently established British-American Tobacco Company in 1911, Ellerslie remained in the Dunlop family through the 1980s and was operated as a dairy farm known as the Greenleaf dairy that supplied milk to Petersburg and Richmond markets. Its large dairy barn built in the 1930s was a local landmark for decades. The portion of Chesterfield County where Ellerslie stands became the City of Colonial Heights in 1948. After its gambrel roof was damaged during a storm, the Ellerslie barn was demolished in the early 1990s and the surrounding farmland has since been developed as a shopping center.

Ellerslie was listed on the National Register of Historic Places in 1973.

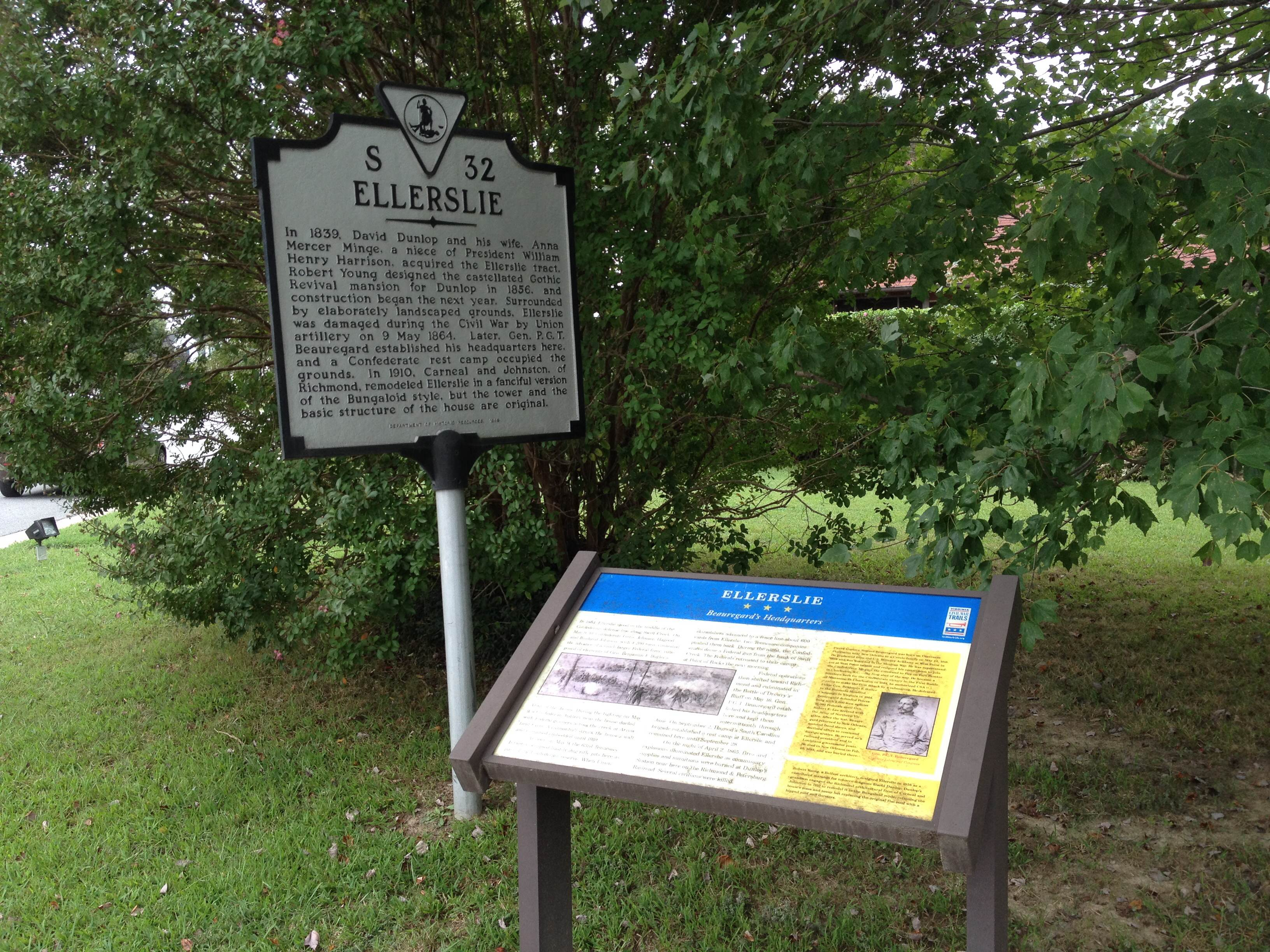
Historical marker at Ellerslie
