= Hong Ki-myung =

- Hangul: 홍기명
- RR: Hong Gimyeong
- MR: Hong Kimyŏng

Hong Ki-myung (Korean: 홍기명; born 1959), also known as Kim Hong, is a South Korean financier.

== Education and career ==
Hong earned his MBA from the University of Chicago's Booth School of Business. He began his career in finance in the mid-1980s, working at a number of industry firms including Citigroup and Bankers Trust. In 2001 he moved to JPMorgan Chase, to become head of their Seoul branch. He became well known in the South Korean finance industry for his role, and at one point it was thought that he would be named head of the Korea Investment Corporation, the sovereign wealth fund managing South Korea's foreign exchange reserves. He later relocated to Hong Kong, while remaining with JPMorgan Chase.

In 2007, Hong moved from JPMorgan Chase to Bank of America, where he took up a position as head of global markets for Asia-Pacific. He would continue to be based in Hong Kong. In June 2008, Hong was promoted to Asia-Pacific president, again based in Hong Kong, reporting to Jonathan Moulds. Hong replaced Colm McCarthy, a 30-year BofA veteran who planned to retire. Six months later in December 2008, BofA acquired Merrill Lynch, BofA stated that former Merrill CFO Nelson Chai would relocate to Hong Kong to head the firms' newly merged Asia Pacific businesses. However, just two months after his appointment, Chai resigned, and BofA again named Hong as Asia-Pacific president.

In 2010, PIMCO hired Hong to manage their Asia-Pacific business, with responsibility for offices in Hong Kong, Singapore, Sydney, and Tokyo. PIMCO also named him a member of their Global Operating Committee. He continued to be based in Hong Kong, reporting to COO Douglas M. Hodge, who previously held the position of Asia-Pacific head. Hong retired in 2013.
