= CIT Group =

American banking and financial services company

- Company logo since 2018
- Type: Subsidiary
- Industry: Banking; Financial services
- Founded: 1908; 118 years ago in St. Louis, Missouri
- Founder: Henry Ittleson
- Headquarters: Salmon Tower Building, New York, New York, USA
- Area served: North America
- Key people: Ellen Alemany (Chairwoman & CEO); John Fawcett (CFO); Robert Rubino (President of CIT Bank)
- Products: Commercial banking Retail banking Asset-based lending Commercial mortgages Factoring; Locomotive leasing
- Parent: First Citizens BancShares
- Website: cit.com

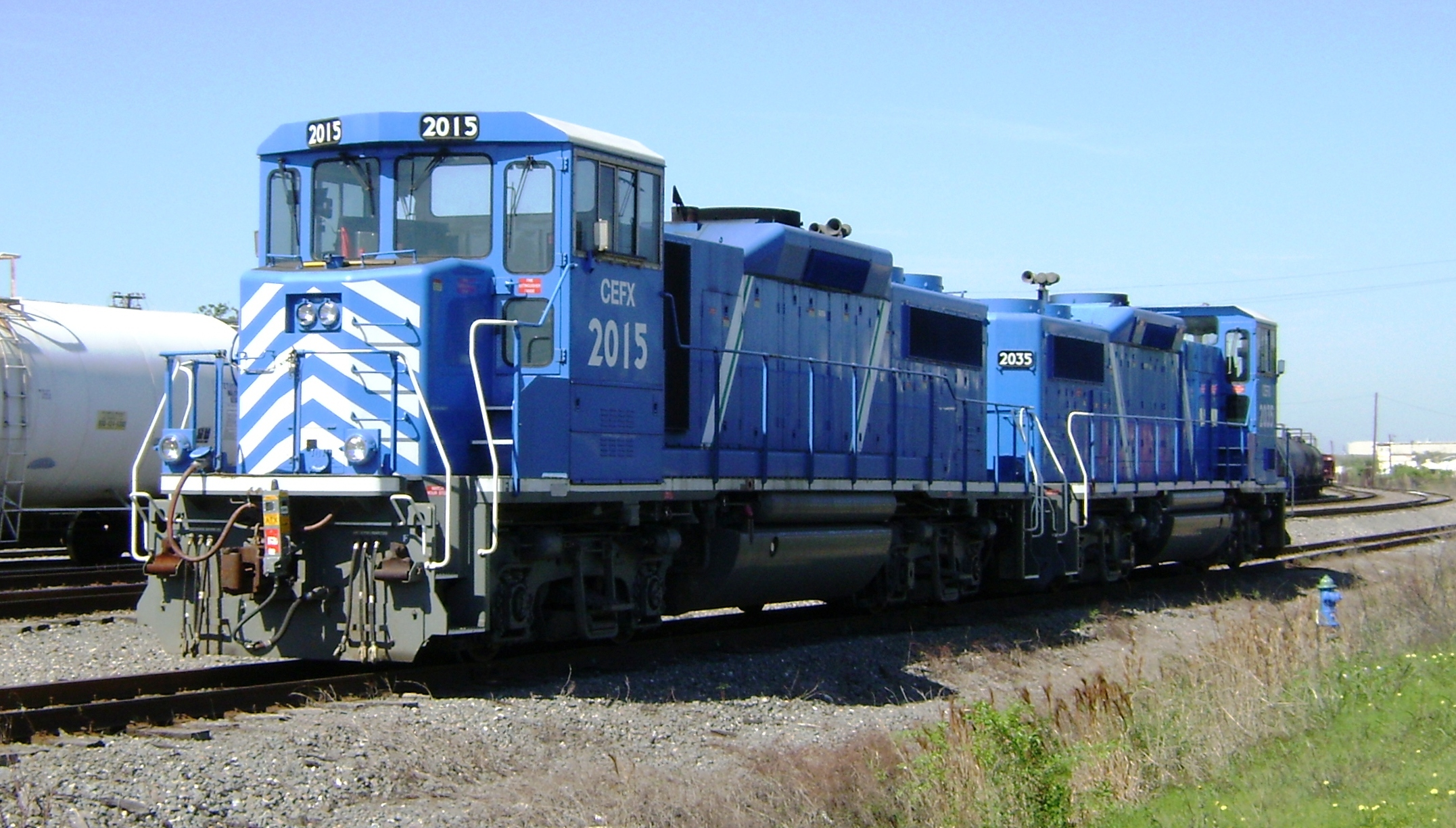
Two CEFX switching locomotives

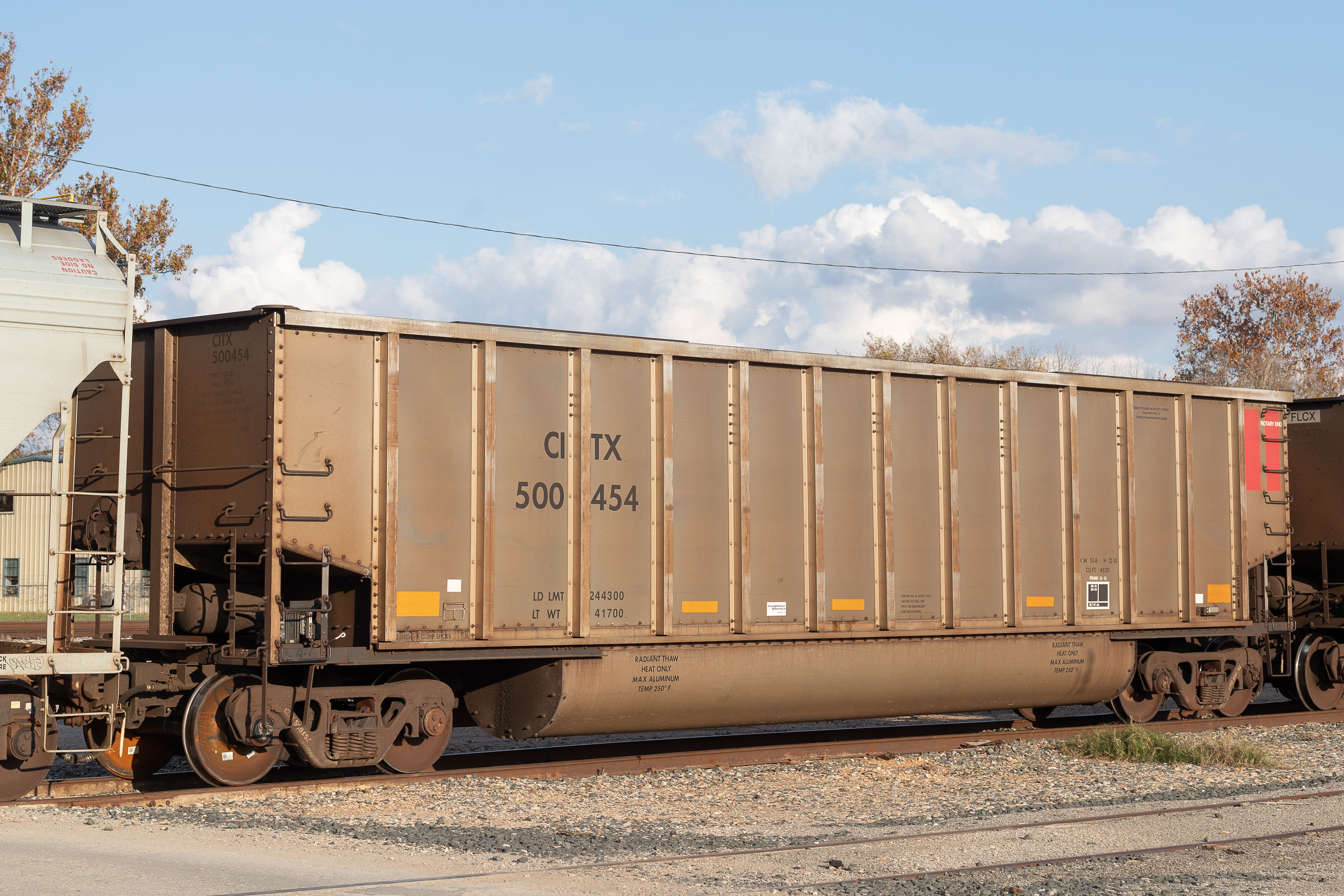
A CITX rotary coal gondola

Logo of CIT Bank

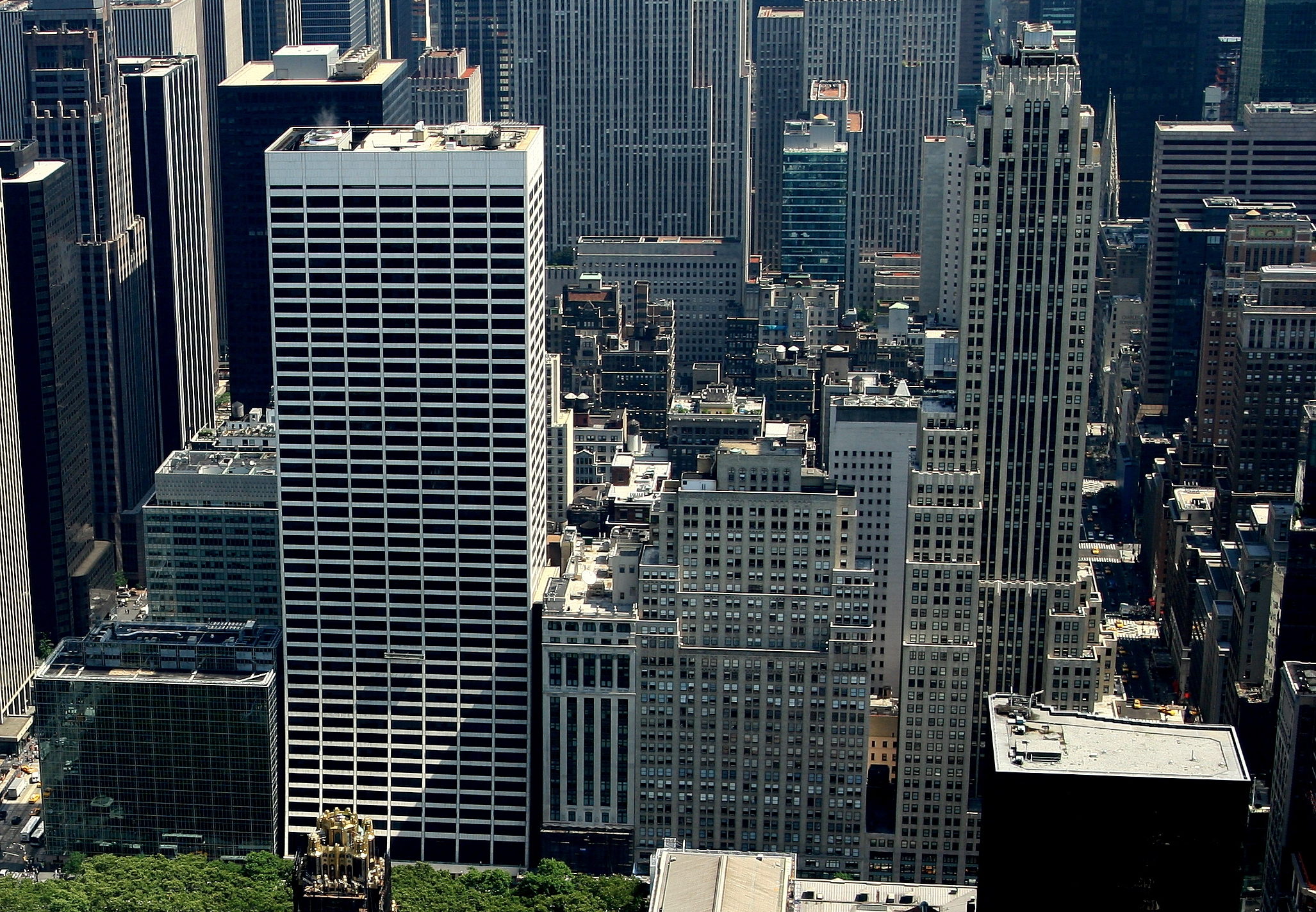
Salmon Tower Building: CIT Group's Headquarters in New York City

CIT Group (CIT), a subsidiary of First Citizens BancShares, is an American financial services company. It provides financing, including factoring, cash management, treasury management, mortgage loans, Small Business Administration loans, leasing, and advisory services principally to individuals, middle-market companies and small businesses, primarily in North America. Under the reporting mark CEFX and CITX, it leases locomotives and railroad cars to rail transport and shipping companies in North America. It also operates a direct bank.

== History ==
=== Founding and early history ===
On February 11, 1908, Henry Ittleson founded the Commercial Credit and Investment Company in St. Louis, Missouri to finance accounts receivable at small companies.

In 1915, the company moved its headquarters to New York City and renamed itself Commercial Investment Trust (CIT). By that time, the company provided financing for wholesale suppliers and producers of consumer goods. The company added automobile financing to its product line in 1916 through an agreement with Studebaker, the first of its kind in the auto industry. During World War I, CIT financed the manufacture of 150 submarine chasers. It also added consumer financing of radios through an agreement with Thomas Edison, Inc. During the Roaring Twenties following the war, consumer spending rose dramatically and CIT prospered in its consumer appliance, furniture, and automobile financing groups. In 1924, CIT incorporated in Delaware and became a public company via an initial public offering on the New York Stock Exchange. CIT began offering factoring in 1928 and expanded operations into Europe in 1929.

With international tensions rising prior to World War II, CIT closed its German operations in 1934. Arthur O. Dietz succeeded Ittleson as president of the company in 1939. During the war, CIT offered its 2,000 employees a month's bonus, life insurance, and a guaranteed job on return if they served in the United States Armed Forces. Between 1947 and 1950, the company's net income rose from $7.3 million to $30.8 million. Ittleson died at age 77 on October 27, 1948.

=== 1950s - 1990s ===
In 1957, the company moved into a new building at 650 Madison Avenue in Manhattan. In 1958, to diversify, the company acquired Picker X-Ray Corporation, maker of X-ray and radiation equipment, for $1.9 million. In 1960, Walter Lundell succeeded Dietz as president of the company. In 1964, it acquired Gibson Greeting Cards for $36 million. In 1965, it acquired Meadow Brook Bank for $106.7 million in stock. In 1969, CIT entered the personal and home equity loan and leasing business and left auto financing. In 1979, restrictive banking rules forced CIT to sell its bank, National Bank of North America. CIT was acquired by RCA Corporation in 1980. RCA promptly sold CIT's four manufacturing businesses: Picker X-Ray, Inc., Gibson Greeting Cards, Inc., All-Steel, Inc. (office furniture), and Raco, Inc. (wall boxes for electric switches and outlets.) The Madison Avenue building was sold in 1982 as the company moved to a newly constructed headquarters facility in Livingston, New Jersey in 1983.

In 1984, CIT was sold to Manufacturers Hanover Trust. In 1989, Manufacturers Hanover Trust sold 60% of CIT to Dai-Ichi Kangyo Bank of Japan.

In 1991, the company acquired Fidelcor Business Credit Corporation, which increased its services to small businesses. In 1992, CIT opened 15 new offices in 7 states.

In 1997, the company became a public company via an initial public offering that raised $850 million.

On November 15, 1999, CIT acquired Toronto-based Newcourt Credit Group in a $4.2 billion transaction, which created one of the largest publicly owned leasing companies.

=== Early 2000s ===
In 2001, Tyco acquired CIT for $9.2 billion in stock. CIT was renamed as Tyco Capital.

Tyco ran into operating troubles and sold or spun off non-core operations, including CIT. On July 8, 2002, Tyco completed its divestment of its Tyco Capital business through an initial public offering, via the sale of 100% of the common shares in CIT Group Inc.

In 2004, the company acquired the technology-leasing unit of GATX for about $200 million in cash.

In April 2006, CIT opened its new global headquarters at the Salmon Tower Building in New York City.

Under the leadership of CEO Jeff Peek, assets at CIT rose 77% from 2004 to the end of 2007 as it acquired companies in education lending and subprime mortgages. Those acquisitions turned out to be disastrous for the company and in the following eight quarters, CIT reported more than $3 billion in losses.

=== Bankruptcy and reorganization ===
In July 2008, the company announced the sale of its home lending division to Lone Star Funds for $1.5 billion in cash and the assumption of $4.4 billion in debt and the sale of its manufactured housing loan portfolio, with a face value of $470 million in loans, to Vanderbilt Mortgage and Finance for approximately $300 million.

In December 2008, CIT became a bank holding company to receive $2.33 billion in funds from the Troubled Asset Relief Program (TARP).

In July 2009, CIT's request for Federal Deposit Insurance Corporation loan guarantees was rejected due to high operating losses and weak credit metrics. The company instead received $3 billion from its bondholders including Pacific Investment Management Company (PIMCO) to delay bankruptcy.

In November 2009, CIT filed a prepackaged bankruptcy under Chapter 11.

In December 2009, CIT emerged from bankruptcy protection.

As part of the reorganization plan, CIT named seven new independent directors. In January 2010, Peter J. Tobin, a member of the board of directors, was named interim chief executive officer, replacing Jeff Peek, who resigned effective January 15, 2010. In February 2010, former Merrill Lynch CEO John Thain was hired as chairman and chief executive officer.

In June 2014, the company acquired Direct Capital.

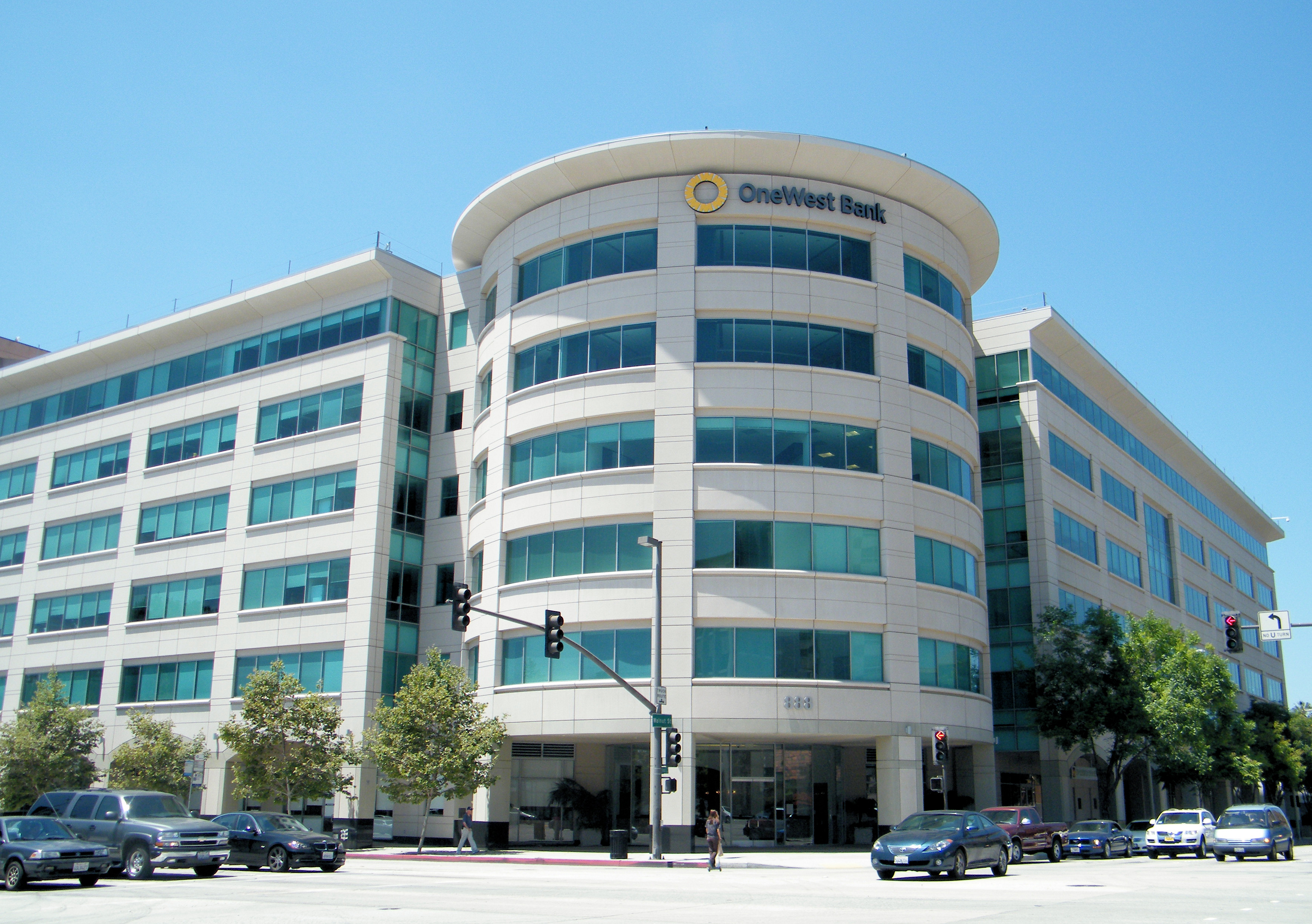
OneWest Bank Headquarters in Pasadena, California

In August 2015, CIT Group acquired OneWest Bank, established in 2009 by a consortium of private equity investors led by Steven Mnuchin, for $3.4 billion in cash and stock.

=== 2016 to present ===
In March 2016, CEO John Thain retired and was succeeded by Ellen Alemany, a member of the board of directors.

In April 2017, the company sold its aircraft lease business to Avolon for $10.38 billion.

In October 2017, the company sold Financial Freedom, acquired as part of the acquisition of OneWest Bank, and its reverse mortgage portfolio.

In October 2018, the company sold its European rail leasing business, NACCO, which was its last overseas operation.

In January 2020, CIT acquired Mutual of Omaha Bank.

In January 2022, CIT was acquired by First Citizens BancShares.
