= Curaçao national football team (disambiguation) =

The term Curaçao national football team may refer to any of the following:

== Association football (soccer) ==
- Curaçao national football team (1921–1958), the original team of the Colony of Curaçao and Dependencies of the former Curaçao Football Association (CVB); first played in 1924
- Netherlands Antilles national football team, successor of the original Curaçao team formed by the Netherlands Antillean Football Union (NAVU) until its dissolution in 2010
- Curaçao national football team, the current men's team of solely the independent Curaçao by the Curaçao Football Federation (FFK) since 2011
- Curaçao women's national football team, the current women's team since 2011
