= C.V.C. Zebra's =

- Full name: Curacaoshe Voetbal Club Zebra's
- Nickname: The Safary Boys
- Founded: 2009
- Ground: Stadion Ergilio Hato, Netherlands Antilles
- Capacity: 15,000
- Manager: Michael Gomes (Netherlands Antilles)
- League: Curaçao League
Home colours	Away colours

The CVC Zebra's is a professional football club in the city of Willemstad, Curaçao, founded in 2009. It plays in the Curaçao League and in the league Netherlands Antilles.

== History ==
=== Squad 2013–2014 ===
Note: Flags indicate national team as defined under FIFA eligibility rules; some limited exceptions apply. Players may hold more than one non-FIFA nationality.

No.	Pos.	Nation	Player
—	GK	NED	Vincent Coevert
—	GK	NED	Jort Berghuis
—	DF	NED	Remco Hoekstra
—	DF	NED	Rubelly Brederode
—	DF	ANT	Aldren Martinez
—	DF	NED	Tristan Shonis
—	DF	NED	Tom Kuijpers
—	DF	NED	Tom Verhallen
—	DF	NED	Roger Van Santen
—	DF	NED	Joris Duesman
—	MF	NED	Dennis Weustink
—	MF	SUR	Marvin Draaibas

No.	Pos.	Nation	Player
—	MF	NED	Gerard Langen
—	MF	COL	Diego Alexis Zuluaga
—	MF	NED	Yarikh De Jongh
—	MF	CUW	David Domitilia
—	MF	ANT	Jerry Gesser
—	MF	NED	Andy Solomons
—	FW	ANT	Gianno Chirino
—	FW	ANT	Jonathan Seymur Cicilia
—	FW	CUW	Eliezer Domitilia
—	FW	ENG	Arran McCarthy

== Notable players ==
Stefan Schmeitz

== Current staff ==
- Michael Gomes Team Manager

== Achievements ==
- Netherlands Antilles Championship:
- Curaçao League:
- Sekshon Amatur: 1

2010–2011

== Home stadiums ==
- Ergilio Hato Stadium

== International Friendlies ==
December 11, 2011

C.V.C. Zebra's (Netherlands Antilles)	6–3	SV Caiquetio (Aruba)

Ergilio Hato Stadium, Willemstad (Netherlands Antilles)

== Sponsors ==
- Toshiba
- Toyota
- Multipost
