= Curaçao national football team =

Men's national association football team representing Curaçao

Curaçao
- Nickname: The Blue Wave
- Association: Federashon Futbòl Kòrsou (FFK)
- Confederation: CONCACAF (North America)
- Sub-confederation: CFU (Caribbean)
- Head coach: Dick Advocaat
- Captain: Leandro Bacuna
- Most caps: Leandro Bacuna and Eloy Room (81)
- Top scorer: Rangelo Janga (21)
- Home stadium: Ergilio Hato Stadium
- FIFA code: CUW
First colours	Second colours

FIFA ranking
- Current: 81 ▼1 (18 November 2026)
- Highest: 68 (July 2017)
- Lowest: 188 (December 2003)

First international
- As the Territory of Curaçao: Aruba 0–4 Curaçao (Aruba, 6 April 1924) As the Netherlands Antilles; Netherlands Antilles 15–0 Puerto Rico (Caracas, Venezuela; 15 January 1959) As the Country of Curaçao: Dominican Republic 1–0 Curaçao (San Cristóbal, Dominican Republic; 18 August 2011)

Biggest win
- As the Territory of Curaçao: Curaçao 14–0 Puerto Rico (Barranquilla, Colombia, 21 December 1948) As the Netherlands Antilles; Netherlands Antilles 15–0 Puerto Rico (Caracas, Venezuela; 15 January 1959) As the Country of Curaçao: Curaçao 10–0 Grenada (Willemstad, Curaçao; 10 September 2018)

Biggest defeat
- As the Territory of Curaçao: Netherlands 8–1 Curaçao (Netherlands, 23 April 1948) As the Netherlands Antilles; Netherlands 8–0 Netherlands Antilles (Amsterdam, Netherlands; 5 September 1962); Mexico 8–0 Netherlands Antilles (Port-au-Prince, Haiti; 8 December 1973) As the Country of Curaçao: Argentina 7–0 Curaçao (Santiago del Estero, Argentina; 28 March 2023)

World Cup
- Appearances: 1 (first in 2026)
- Best result: Group stage (2026)

CONCACAF Gold Cup
- Appearances: 3 (first in 2017)
- Best result: Quarter-finals (2019)
Medal record
Caribbean Cup
Gold medal – first place	2017 Martinique	Team

The Curaçao national football team (Dutch: Curaçaos voetbalelftal; Papiamento: selekshon di futbòl Kòrsou) represents Curaçao in men's international football. The team is governed by the Federashon Futbòl Kòrsou.

Following a constitutional change that allowed its predecessor, the Colony of Curaçao and Dependencies, to become a unified constituent country consisting of several island territories as the Netherlands Antilles and its dissolution in 2010, Curaçao has played under a new constitutional status as a separate constituent country since 2011.

Both FIFA and CONCACAF recognize the Curaçao national team as the direct successor of the dependant Territory of Curaçao (1921–1958) and the Netherlands Antilles (1958–2010).

In November 2025, they topped their qualifying group and qualified for the 2026 FIFA World Cup, becoming the smallest nation by both population and area to qualify for the tournament. They faced Germany in their debut match in 2026 FIFA World Cup. Curaçao became the first non-sovereign national team from the Americas to qualify for the FIFA World Cup, and the seventh overall, after England, Wales, Scotland and Northern Ireland (which are constituent countries of the United Kingdom and not independent countries), the Netherlands (a constituent country of the Kingdom of the Netherlands), and the Dutch East Indies, a Dutch colony that competed in the 1938 tournament.

== History ==
The first national football team to bear the name Curaçao was the Territory of Curaçao national football team, which made its debut in 1924 in an away match against neighboring Aruba, a match which the Territory of Curaçao won four to nil.

In December 1954, the territory of Curaçao became the Netherlands Antilles, and following a constitutional change the Netherlands Antilles were designated a country within the Kingdom of the Netherlands, which included the islands of Aruba, Bonaire, Saba, Sint Eustatius and Sint Maarten. The name of the Curaçao team changed to Netherlands Antilles national team, representing all six islands.

In 1986, Aruba became a country within the Kingdom in its own right, with its own Aruba national team and subsequently Aruban players no longer represented the Netherlands Antilles.

On 10 October 2010, the Netherlands Antilles were dissolved, and Curaçao and Sint Maarten became countries in their own right, while Bonaire, Saba and Sint Eustatius became part of the Netherlands proper. Although not a sovereign state, Curaçao (the largest island territory in the Netherlands Antilles) appeared on the FIFA member list in March 2011, as successor of the Netherlands Antilles.

As well as taking on the Netherlands Antilles' FIFA membership, Curaçao was recognised as the direct successor of the former (similarly to how Serbia is regarded the direct successor of Yugoslavia, and Russia for the Soviet Union), and took on its historical records and FIFA ranking.

They played their first match as the newly formed Curaçao national team on 20 August 2011 against Dominican Republic at the Estadio Panamericano, with the match ending in a 1–0 loss for Curaçao.

During the CONCACAF Qualification for the 2018 FIFA World Cup, Curaçao achieved a major feat when they defeated Cuba 1–1 with the away goals rule.

=== CONCACAF Gold Cup debut ===
After a strong qualification campaign, Curaçao defeated host Martinique in the semi-finals of the 2017 edition of the Caribbean Cup with the score of 2–1. They met defending champions and six-time winners, Jamaica. Curaçao won its first ever Caribbean Cup by defeating Jamaica, again with the scoreline of 2–1, which saw Curaçao qualified to its first ever CONCACAF Gold Cup. Curaçao was then drawn in Group C in the 2017 CONCACAF Gold Cup alongside Jamaica, El Salvador and Mexico but lost all of its group stage matches.

In the next edition of the 2019 CONCACAF Gold Cup, Curaçao was then drawn in Group C alongside El Salvador, Jamaica and Honduras. On 21 June 2019, Curaçao got its first win in the CONCACAF Gold Cup when Leandro Bacuna scored in a 1–0 win over Honduras. With a much needed win to qualify to the next round, Juriën Gaari scored a stoppage time goal against Jamaica in the last group stage fixtures which saw Curaçao finishing as runners-up in the group stage, thus qualifying to the knockout stage. In the quarter-finals, Curaçao then bowed out from the tournament after losing to United States.

=== FIFA World Cup debut ===
In November 2025, during the 2026 FIFA World Cup qualification, Curaçao drew 0–0 against Jamaica, making Curaçao the smallest nation by both population and area (only five weeks after Cape Verde had broken the area record) ever to qualify for the FIFA World Cup in history. On 23 February 2026, manager Dick Advocaat would resign as Curaçao's manager due to personal reasons regarding the health of his daughter. Subsequently, Fred Rutten was appointed as head coach ahead of the World Cup. On May 11, after his daughter's health improved, Advocaat returned to the national team. This was also due to disagreements between the national team's players and Advocaat's successor Fred Rutten as well as pressure from the national team's main sponsor, Dutch airline company Corendon. With his return, Advocaat will become the oldest manager in history to coach a team during the FIFA World Cup.

Curaçao's first goal at a World Cup was scored by Livano Comenencia during their opener against Germany, which would eventually defeat the Blue Wave 7–1. In their second match, Curaçao earned their first-ever point at a World Cup in a 0–0 draw with Ecuador; Eloy Room finished one save short of Tim Howard's record for most saves in a World Cup match with 15, making him the first Curaçaoan player to be named Man of the Match in a World Cup contest.

== Team image ==
=== Kit sponsorship ===
Kit supplier	Period
(United States) Score	1990–2002
(Netherlands) Beltona	2002–2015
(United States) Nike	2016–2023
(Spain) Kelme	2024–2025
(Germany) Adidas	2025–present

== Results and fixtures ==
The following is a list of match results in the last 12 months, as well as any future matches that have been scheduled.

Win Draw Loss Fixture

=== 2026 ===
27 March 2026 FIFA Series	China	2–0	Curaçao	Sydney, Australia
17:00 UTC+11	Wei Shihao 45+2'; Zhang Yuning 59'	Report		Stadium: Stadium Australia; Attendance: 7,578; Referee: Alex King

31 March 2026 FIFA Series	Australia	5–1	Curaçao	Melbourne, Australia
20:10 AEDT	Mabil 23'; Circati 67'; Bos 71'; Irankunda 80', 84'	Report	Martha 50'	Stadium: AAMI Park; Referee: Andrew Madley (England)

30 May Friendly	Scotland	4–1	Curaçao	Glasgow, Scotland
13:00 BST	Curtis 45'; Shankland 59', 64'; Christie 81' (pen.)	Report	Chong 17'	Stadium: Hampden Park; Attendance: 44,433; Referee: Goga Kikacheishvili (Georgia)

6 June Friendly	Curaçao	4–0	Aruba	Willemstad, Curaçao
19:30 AST	Brenet 53'; Antonisse 68'; Comenencia 83'; Bacuna 90'	Report		Stadium: Ergilio Hato Stadium; Referee: José Corporán (Dominican Republic)

14 June 2026 FIFA World Cup Group E	Germany	7–1	Curaçao	Houston, Texas, United States
12:00 CDT	Nmecha 6'; Schlotterbeck 38'; Havertz 45+5' (pen.), 88'; Musiala 47'; Brown 68'; Undav 78'	Report	Comenencia 21'	Stadium: NRG Stadium; Attendance: 68,021; Referee: Jalal Jayed (Morocco)

20 June 2026 FIFA World Cup Group E	Ecuador	0–0	Curaçao	Kansas City, Missouri, United States
19:00 CDT		Report		Stadium: Arrowhead Stadium; Attendance: 68,598; Referee: Ma Ning (China)

25 June 2026 FIFA World Cup Group E	Curaçao	0–2	Ivory Coast	Philadelphia, Pennsylvania, United States
16:00 UTC−4		Report	Pépé 7', 64'	Stadium: Lincoln Financial Field; Attendance: 68,324; Referee: Glenn Nyberg (Sweden)

24 September 2026-27 CONCACAF Nations League A Group Stage	Costa Rica	3–4	Curaçao	San José, Costa Rica
20:00 UTC−6	Sinclair 3'; Mora 23', 45+1'	Report	Gorré 62', 78'; Chong 66'; Paulina 83'	Stadium: Estadio Ricardo Saprissa Aymá; Attendance: 8,388; Referee: Mario Escobar (Guatemala)

27 September 2026-27 CONCACAF Nations League A Group Stage	Curaçao	6–1	Nicaragua	Willemstad, Curaçao
20:00 UTC−4	Comenencia 6'; Gorré 11', 39'; L. Bacuna 19'; J. Bacuna 27'; Locadia 88'	Report	Moreno 62'	Stadium: Ergilio Hato Stadium; Attendance: 7,485; Referee: Saíd Martínez (Honduras)

1 October 2026-27 CONCACAF Nations League A Group Stage	Curaçao	1–0	Trinidad and Tobago	Willemstad, Curaçao
18:00 UTC−4	J.Bacuna 58'	Report		Stadium: Ergilio Hato Stadium; Attendance: 7,485; Referee: Oshane Nation (Jamaica)

4 October 2026-27 CONCACAF Nations League A Group Stage	Trinidad and Tobago	1–1	Curaçao	Port of Spain, Trinidad and Tobago
18:00 UTC−4	Phillip 39'	Report	Paulina 61'	Stadium: Hasely Crawford Stadium; Attendance: 3,977; Referee: Nelson Salgado (Honduras)

12 November 2026-27 CONCACAF Nations League A Quarter-finals	Curaçao	0–0	Panama	Willemstad, Curaçao
20:00 UTC−4				Stadium: Ergilio Hato Stadium; Referee: Tori Penso (United States)

15 November 2026-27 CONCACAF Nations League A Quarter-finals	Panama	2–0	Curaçao	Panama City, Panama
18:00 UTC−5	Fajardo 45', 51'			Stadium: Estadio Rommel Fernández; Referee: Marco Ortiz (Mexico)

=== 2027 ===
March 2027 CONCACAF Gold Cup qualification	El Salvador	v	Curaçao	San Salvador, El Salvador
{{}}				Stadium: Estadio Jorge "El Mágico" González

March 2027 CONCACAF Gold Cup qualification	Curaçao	v	El Salvador	Willemstad, Curaçao
{{}}				Stadium: Ergilio Hato Stadium

== Coaching staff ==
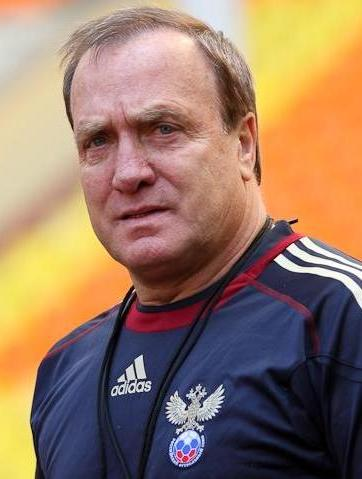
Current head coach Dick Advocaat, who lead Curaçao to their debut appearance at the FIFA World Cup

Position	Name
Head coach	(Netherlands) Dick Advocaat
Assistant coach	(Netherlands) Cor Pot
Assistant coach	(Suriname) Dean Gorré
Assistant coach	(Curaçao) Gersinio Constansia
Goalkeeper coach	(Netherlands) Raymond Mulder
Performance coach	(Curaçao) Angelo Cijntje
Team Doctor	(Curaçao) Dr. Ramfis Fillet
Video Analyst	(Netherlands) Jim Smit
Team Manager	(Curaçao) Wouter Jansen
Media Officer	(Morocco) Anouar Amrani

=== Coaching history ===
Caretaker manager are listed in italics.

- (Argentina) Manuel Bilches (2011–12)
- (Curaçao) Ludwig Alberto (2012–14)
- (Curaçao) Igemar Pieternella (2014)
- (Curaçao) Etienne Siliee (2014–15)
- (Netherlands) Patrick Kluivert (2015–16, 2021)
- (Netherlands) Remko Bicentini (2016–20)
- (Netherlands) Guus Hiddink (2020–21)
- (Netherlands) Art Langeler (2022)
- (Netherlands) Remko Bicentini (2022–2023)
- (Suriname) Dean Gorré (2023)
- (Netherlands) Dick Advocaat (2024–2026, 2026–)
- (Netherlands) Fred Rutten (2026)

== Players ==
Notes

- Caps and goals do not include matches played for the former Netherlands Antilles, but solely appearances for the thereout subsequent country of Curaçao.

=== Current squad ===
The following players were called up for the 2026–27 CONCACAF Nations League A matches against Panama (twice) on 12 and 15 November 2026.

Caps and goals as of 15 November 2026, after the second game against Panama.

No.	Pos.	Player	Date of birth (age)	Caps	Goals	Club
	GK	Eloy Room	6 February 1989 (age 37)	81	0	(United States Soccer Federation) Miami FC
	GK	Tyrick Bodak	15 May 2002 (age 24)	4	0	(Royal Dutch Football Association) Vitesse
	GK	Kiyani Zeggen	15 October 2006 (age 20)	0	0	(Royal Dutch Football Association) Jong AZ
	DF	Juriën Gaari	23 December 1993 (age 32)	68	1	(Saudi Arabian Football Federation) Abha
	DF	Sherel Floranus	23 August 1998 (age 28)	35	0	(Royal Dutch Football Association) PEC Zwolle
	DF	Roshon van Eijma	9 June 1998 (age 28)	30	1	(Hellenic Football Federation) Kifisia
	DF	Joshua Brenet	20 March 1994 (age 32)	23	2	(Turkish Football Federation) Kayserispor
	DF	Jurich Carolina	15 July 1998 (age 28)	19	1	(Football Association of Bosnia and Herzegovina) Borac Banja Luka
	DF	Shurandy Sambo	19 August 2001 (age 25)	15	0	(The Football Association) Burnley
	DF	Armando Obispo	5 March 1999 (age 27)	12	0	(Royal Dutch Football Association) PSV Eindhoven
	DF	Deveron Fonville	16 May 2003 (age 23)	5	0	(Royal Dutch Football Association) NEC
	MF	Leandro Bacuna	21 August 1991 (age 35)	81	17	(Turkish Football Federation) Iğdır
	MF	Juninho Bacuna	7 August 1997 (age 29)	59	16	(Turkish Football Federation) Gaziantep
	MF	Jeremy Antonisse	29 March 2002 (age 24)	32	4	(Hellenic Football Federation) Kifisia
	MF	Godfried Roemeratoe	19 August 1999 (age 27)	29	1	(Romanian Football Federation) Voluntari
	MF	Livano Comenencia	3 February 2004 (age 22)	29	4	(Swiss Football Association) Zürich
	MF	Nicky Souren	18 December 1999 (age 26)	5	0	(Royal Dutch Football Association) Cambuur
	FW	Kenji Gorré	29 September 1994 (age 32)	45	10	(Israel Football Association) Maccabi Haifa
	FW	Jearl Margaritha	10 April 2000 (age 26)	26	5	(Royal Belgian Football Association) Beveren
	FW	Tahith Chong	4 December 1999 (age 26)	14	4	(The Football Association) Sheffield United
	FW	Ar'jany Martha	4 September 2003 (age 23)	11	2	(Royal Dutch Football Association) Telstar
	FW	Jerolldino Bergraaf	5 July 2006 (age 20)	1	0	(Royal Dutch Football Association) Jong AZ
	FW	Nigel Thomas	1 February 2001 (age 25)	1	0	(Royal Dutch Football Association) ADO Den Haag

=== Recent call-ups ===
The following players have been called up for the team in the last twelve months.

Pos.	Player	Date of birth (age)	Caps	Goals	Club	Latest call-up
GK	Trevor Doornbusch	6 July 1999 (age 27)	8	0	(Netherlands) VVV-Venlo	2026 FIFA World Cup
DF	Kyano Penso	12 April 2008 (age 18)	1	0	(Netherlands) Jong PSV	v. Trinidad and Tobago, 4 October 2026
DF	Riechedly Bazoer	12 October 1996 (age 30)	6	0	Unattached	2026 FIFA World Cup
MF	Tyrese Noslin	11 September 2002 (age 24)	9	1	(England) Barnsley	v. Trinidad and Tobago, 4 October 2026
MF	Kevin Felida	11 November 1999 (age 27)	19	1	(Vietnam) Hanoi FC	2026 FIFA World Cup
FW	Jürgen Locadia	7 November 1993 (age 33)	20	2	(United States) Tampa Bay Rowdies	v. Trinidad and Tobago, 4 October 2026
FW	Jordi Paulina	23 September 2004 (age 22)	5	4	(Germany) Fortuna Dusseldorf	v. Trinidad and Tobago, 4 October 2026
FW	Brandley Kuwas	19 September 1992 (age 34)	36	2	(Saudi Arabia) Al-Bukiryah	2026 FIFA World Cup
FW	Gervane Kastaneer	9 June 1996 (age 30)	32	9	(Malaysia) Terengganu	2026 FIFA World Cup
FW	Sontje Hansen	18 May 2002 (age 24)	7	1	(Turkey) Gaziantep	2026 FIFA World Cup
^{RET} = Player retired from the national team.^{SUS} = Player is serving suspension.^{INJ} = Player withdrew from the squad due to an injury.^{PRE} = Preliminary squad.^{WD} = Player withdrew from the squad due to non-injury issue.

== Player records ==
As of 15 November 2026
Players in bold are still active with Curaçao.

=== Most appearances ===
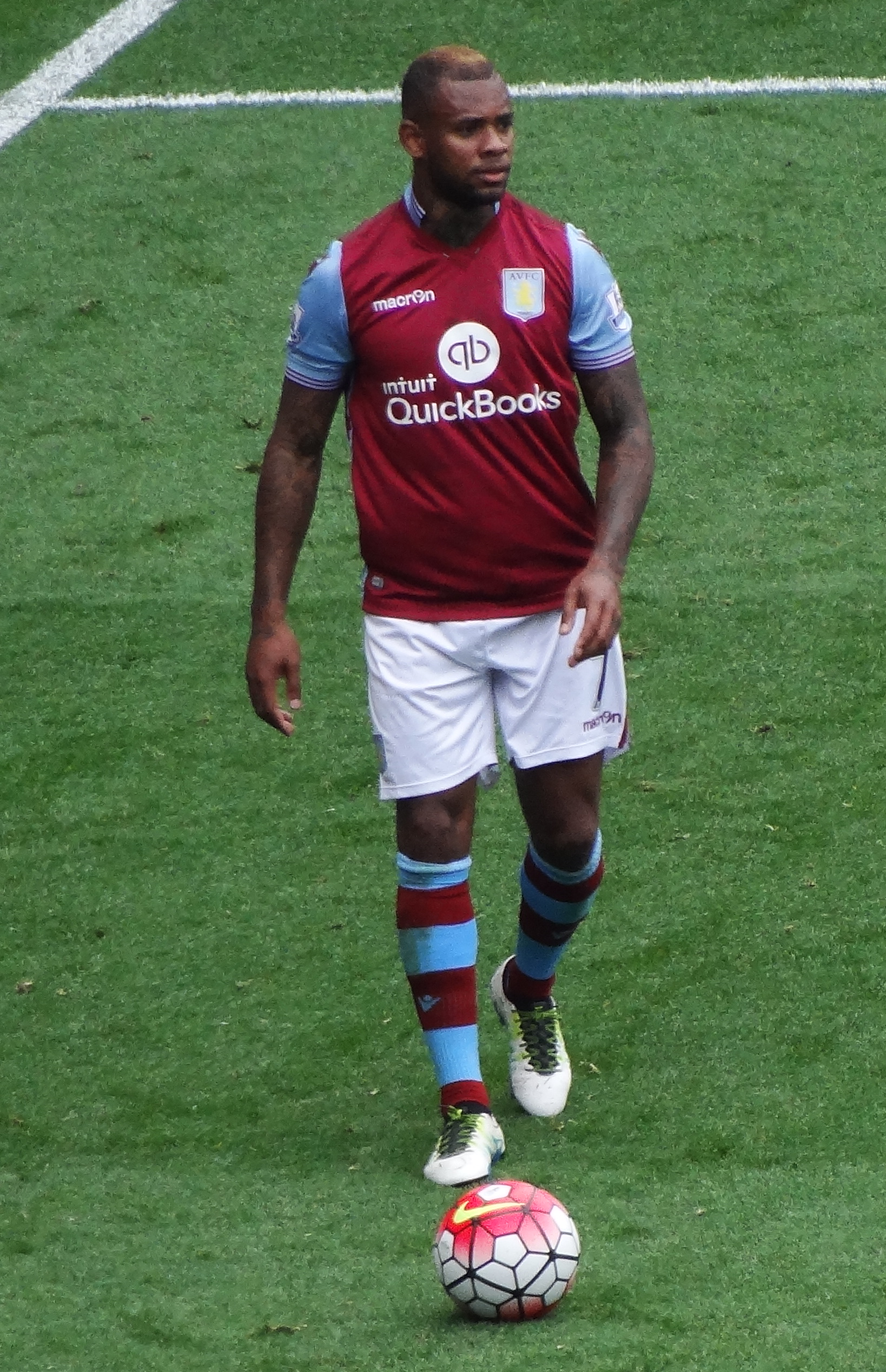
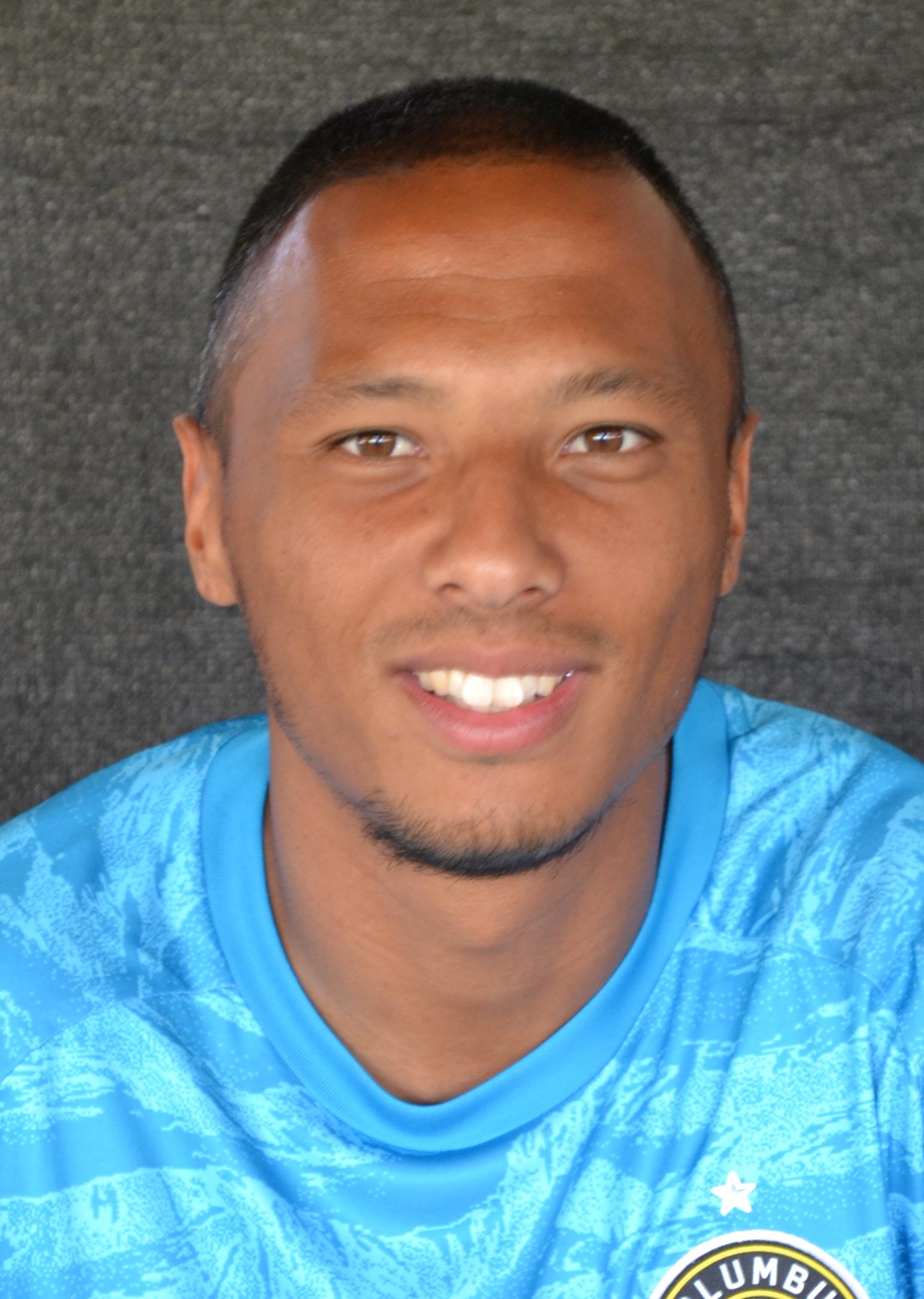
Leandro Bacuna and Eloy Room are the Curaçao's joint-most capped players with 80 appearances each.

Rank	Player	Caps	Goals	Career
1	**Leandro Bacuna**	81	17	2016–present
1	**Eloy Room**	81	0	2015–present
3	**Juriën Gaari**	68	1	2016–present
4	Cuco Martina	67	1	2011–2025
5	**Juninho Bacuna**	59	16	2019–present
6	Gevaro Nepomuceno	52	8	2014–2023
7	**Kenji Gorré**	45	10	2019–present
8	Rangelo Janga	43	21	2016–2025
9	Shanon Carmelia	38	2	2011–2022
9	Elson Hooi	38	10	2015–2023

=== Top goalscorers ===
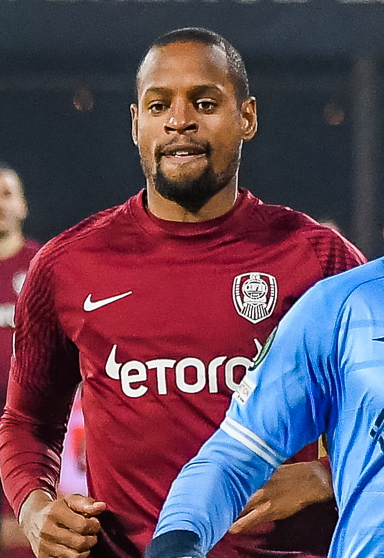
Rangelo Janga is Curaçao's top scorer with 21 goals.

Rank	Player	Goals	Caps	Ratio	Career
1	Rangelo Janga	21	43	0.49	2016–2025
2	**Leandro Bacuna**	17	81	0.21	2016–present
3	**Juninho Bacuna**	16	59	0.27	2019–present
4	Elson Hooi	10	38	0.26	2015–2023
4	**Kenji Gorré**	10	45	0.22	2019–present
5	Felitciano Zschusschen	9	14	0.64	2015–2017
5	**Gervane Kastaneer**	9	32	0.28	2018–present
7	Gino van Kessel	8	26	0.31	2015–2024
7	Gevaro Nepomuceno	8	52	0.15	2014–2023
9	Rocky Siberie	6	6	1	2011
9	Jurensley Martina	6	8	0.75	2012–2022

== Curaçao records and statistics ==
- Curaçao first matches played: - v Dominican Republic, - 18 August 2011
- Curaçao first goals scored: - Rihairo Meulens - v Antigua and Barbuda, - 2 September 2011
- Most meeting played: 8 - v El Salvador, 17 June 2025
- Curaçao player sent off: - (7 times)
  - Rugenio Josephia - v U.S. Virgin Islands, 15 November 2011 (42nd minute)
  - Hujoybert Delando - v Saint Lucia, 21 October 2012 (89th minute)
  - Quinston Bartholomeus - v Guyana, 23 October 2012 (89th minute)
  - Gianluca Maria - v Cuba, 10 June 2015 (86th minute)
  - Jarchinio Antonia - v Bolivia, 26 March 2018 (53rd minute)
  - Juninho Bacuna - v Indonesia, 27 September 2022 (80th minute)
  - Jürgen Locadia - v Scotland, 30 May 2026 (38th minute)
- Longest winning streak: 5 - from 26 March 2016 to 11 October 2016
- Longest unbeaten streak: 8 - from 30 January 2015 to 14 June 2018
- Longest losing streak: 5 - from 18 August 2011 to 23 September 2011
- Longest winless streak: 8 - (2 times)
  - from 18 August 2011 to 11 October 2011
  - from 9 June 2022 to 16 June 2023
- Longest goalless streak: 409 minute - from 14 June 2015 to 26 March 2016
- Longest clean sheet streak: 422 minute - from 6 September 2024 to 18 November 2024
- Longest goalless streak by both teams: 171 minute - from 5 September 2014 to 8 October 2014
- Most appearances: 79 - (2 times)
  - Leandro Bacuna - 2016-present
  - Eloy Room - 2015-present
- Top goalscorer: 21 - Rangelo Janga - 2016-2025
- Biggest win: 10 - v Grenada, 10 September 2018
- Biggest defeat: 7 - v Germany, 14 June 2026
- Most goals by a player in a match: 4 - Jearl Margaritha - v Saint Martin, 15 November 2024
- Most goals by a opponent player in a match: 4 - Christian Rasmussen - v AFC Ajax, 20 May 2022
- Most goals by different player in a match: 7 - v Grenada, 10 September 2018
- Most goals by different player by a opponent in a match: 6 - v Germany, 14 June 2026
- Most goals in a match: 10 - v Grenada, 10 September 2018
- Most goals in first half: 6 - v British Virgin Islands, 5 June 2021
- Most goals in second half: 7 - v Grenada, 10 September 2018
- Most goals conceded in a match: 7 - (2 times)
  - v Argentina, 28 March 2023
  - v Germany, 14 June 2026
- Most goals conceded in first half: 5 - v Argentina, 28 March 2023
- Most goals conceded in second half: 4 - (2 times)
  - v Australia, 31 March 2026
  - v Germany, 14 June 2026
- Most goals by both teams in a match: 11 - v Bonaire, 15 July 2012
- Fewest goals by both teams in a match: 0 - (13 times)
  - v French Guiana, 7 September 2014
  - v Aruba, 30 January 2015
  - v Cuba, 10 June 2015
  - v Nicaragua, 17 June 2017
  - v Costa Rica, 13 October 2019
  - v Guatemala, 8 June 2021
  - v Panama, 15 June 2021
  - v Puerto Rico, 13 June 2023
  - v Grenada, 11 October 2024
  - v El Salvador, 17 June 2025
  - v Trinidad and Tobago, 5 September 2025
  - v Jamaica, 18 November 2025
  - v Ecuador, 20 June 2026
  - v Panama, 12 November 2026
- Fastest goals: 18 seconds - Juninho Bacuna - v Saint Vincent and the Grenadines, 25 March 2021
- Fastest goals conceded: 1st minute - (2 times)
  - Vurlon Mills - v Guyana, 23 October 2012
  - Carl Osbourne - v Antigua and Barbuda, 23 March 2019
- Latest goal scored: 121st minute - Leandro Bacuna - v Puerto Rico, 11 October 2016
- Fastest 2 goals: 2 minute - (6 times)
  - v Aruba, 13 July 2012
  - v Guyana, 1 June 2016
  - v U.S. Virgin Islands, 12 October 2018
  - v Guadeloupe, 19 November 2018
  - v British Virgin Islands, 5 June 2021 (2 times)
- Fastest 2 goals to start the match: 9th minute - v British Virgin Islands, 5 June 2021
- Fastest 2 goals conceded: 2 minute - (4 times)
  - v Bahrain, 6 October 2021
  - v Argentina, 28 March 2023 (2 times)
  - v Germany, 14 June 2026
- Fastest 2 goals conceded to start the match: 22nd minute - v Indonesia, 24 September 2022
- Fastest 3 goals: 4 minute - v British Virgin Islands, 5 June 2021
- Fastest 3 goals to start the match: 11th minute - v British Virgin Islands, 5 June 2021
- Fastest 3 goals conceded: 4 minute - v Argentina, 28 March 2023
- Fastest 3 goals conceded to start the match: 33rd minute - v Argentina, 28 March 2023
- Fastest 4 goals to start the match: 18th minute - v British Virgin Islands, 5 June 2021
- Fastest 4 goals conceded to start the match: 35th minute - v Argentina, 28 March 2023
- Fastest 5 goals to start the match: 22nd minute - v British Virgin Islands, 5 June 2021
- Fastest 5 goals conceded to start the match: 37th minute - v Argentina, 28 March 2023

=== FIFA World Cup records and statistics ===
- Most consecutive failed qualification attempts: 16 - 1958-2022
- Worst results: 42nd place - 2026
- Longest winless streak: 3 - from 14 June 2026 to present
- Longest goalless streak: 2 - from 20 June 2026 to present
- Longest goalless streak by minute: 249 minutes - from 14 June 2026 to present
- Longest clean sheet: 96 minutes - from 14 June 2026 to 25 June 2026
- Longest goalless streak by both teams: 96 minutes - from 14 June 2026 to 25 June 2026
- Biggest win: 0 - None
- Biggest defeat: 6 - v Germany, 14 June 2026
- Most appearances: 3 - (10 player) - 2026
  - Juninho Bacuna - 2026
  - Leandro Bacuna - 2026
  - Tahith Chong - 2026
  - Livano Comenencia - 2026
  - Sherel Floranus - 2026
  - Deveron Fonville - 2026
  - Gervane Kastaneer - 2026
  - Jurgen Locadia - 2026
  - Armando Obispo - 2026
  - Eloy Room - 2026
- Most matches lost: 2 - (11 player) - 2026
  - Juninho Bacuna - 2026
  - Leandro Bacuna - 2026
  - Tahith Chong - 2026
  - Livano Comenencia - 2026
  - Sherel Floranus - 2026
  - Deveron Fonville - 2026
  - Gervane Kastaneer - 2026
  - Jurgen Locadia - 2026
  - Armando Obispo - 2026
  - Eloy Room - 2026
  - Jeremy Antonisse - 2026
- Most appearances by a substitutions: 3 - Gervane Kastaneer - 2026
- Most Man of the Match: 1 - Eloy Room - 2026
- Most clean sheet: 1 - Eloy Room - 2026
- Most clean sheet by a opponent: 1 - (2 times) - 2026
  - Hernán Galíndez - 2026
  - Yahia Fofana - 2026
- Most goals scored: 1 - Livano Comenencia - 2026
- Most yellow cards: 2 - (2 times)
  - Juninho Bacuna - 2026
  - Gervane Kastaneer - 2026
- Curaçao player got yellow card: (7 times)
  - Leandro Bacuna - v Ecuador, 20 June 2026
  - Juninho Bacuna - v Ecuador, 20 June 2026
  - Livano Comenencia - v Ecuador, 20 June 2026
  - Juriën Gaari - v Ecuador, 20 June 2026
  - Gervane Kastaneer - v Ecuador, 20 June 2026
  - Juninho Bacuna - v Ivory Coast, 25 June 2026
  - Gervane Kastaneer - v Ivory Coast, 25 June 2026
- Fastest goals: 21st minute - Livano Comenencia - v Germany, 14 June 2026
- Fastest goals conceded: 6th minute - Felix Nmecha - v Germany, 14 June 2026
- Most goals by a player in a match: 1 - Livano Comenencia - v Germany, 14 June 2026
- Most goals by a player in first half: 1 - Livano Comenencia - v Germany, 14 June 2026
- Most goals by a player in second half: 0 - None
- Most goals by a opponent player in a match: 2 - (2 times)
  - Kai Havertz - v Germany, 14 June 2026
  - Nicolas Pépé - v Ivory Coast, 25 June 2026
- Most goals by a opponent player in first half: 1 - (4 times)
  - Felix Nmecha - v Germany, 14 June 2026
  - Nico Schlotterbeck - v Germany, 14 June 2026
  - Kai Havertz - v Germany, 14 June 2026
  - Nicolas Pépé - v Ivory Coast, 25 June 2026
- Most goals by a opponent player in second half: 1 - (5 times)
  - Jamal Musiala - v Germany, 14 June 2026
  - Nathaniel Brown - v Germany, 14 June 2026
  - Deniz Undav - v Germany, 14 June 2026
  - Kai Havertz - v Germany, 14 June 2026
  - Nicolas Pépé - v Ivory Coast, 25 June 2026
- Most goals by a opponent player by a substitutions: 1 - Deniz Undav - v Germany, 14 June 2026
- Most goals in a match: 1 - v Germany, 14 June 2026
- Most goals in first half: 1 - v Germany, 14 June 2026
- Most goals in second half: 0 - None
- Most goals conceded in a match: 7 - v Germany, 14 June 2026
- Most goals conceded in first half: 3 - v Germany, 14 June 2026
- Most goals conceded in second half: 4 - v Germany, 14 June 2026
- Most goals by both teams in a match: 8 - v Germany, 14 June 2026
- Most goals by both teams in first half: 4 - v Germany, 14 June 2026
- Most goals by both teams in second half: 4 - v Germany, 14 June 2026
- Fewest goals by both teams in a match: 0 - v Ecuador, 20 June 2026
- Most yellow cards in a match: 5 - v Ecuador, 20 June 2026
- Most yellow cards in first half: 1 - v Ecuador, 20 June 2026
- Most yellow cards in second half: 4 - v Ecuador, 20 June 2026
- Most yellow cards by a opponent in a match: 1 - (2 times)
  - v Ecuador, 20 June 2026
  - v Ivory Coast, 25 June 2026
- Most yellow cards by a opponent in first half: 1 - (2 times)
  - v Ecuador, 20 June 2026
  - v Ivory Coast, 25 June 2026
- Most yellow cards by a opponent in second half: 0 - None
- Most yellow cards by both teams in a match: 6 - v Ecuador, 20 June 2026
- Most yellow cards by both teams in first half: 2 - v Ecuador, 20 June 2026
- Most yellow cards by both teams in second half: 4 - v Ecuador, 20 June 2026
- Fewest yellow cards by both teams in a match: 0 - v Germany, 14 June 2026
- Most saves in a match: 15 - Eloy Room - v Ecuador, 20 June 2026 (FIFA World Cup regulation records)
- Most saves in one half: 9 - Eloy Room - v Ecuador, 20 June 2026 (2nd half)
- Most saves by a opponent goalkeeper in a match: 3 - Hernán Galíndez - v Ecuador, 20 June 2026
- Most saves by a opponent goalkeeper in one half: 3 - Hernán Galíndez - v Ecuador, 20 June 2026 (2nd half)
- Longest shotless streak: 26 minutes - v Ivory Coast, 25 June 2026
- Longest shotless streak by a opponent: 30 minutes - v Ivory Coast, 25 June 2026
- Most shots in a match: 11 - v Ivory Coast, 25 June 2026
- Most shots in one half: 7 - v Ivory Coast, 25 June 2026 (2nd half)
- Fewest shots in a match: 8 - v Germany, 14 June 2026
- Fewest shots in one half: 4 - (4 times)
  - v Germany, 14 June 2026 (1st and 2nd half)
  - v Ecuador, 20 June 2026 (1st half)
  - v Ivory Coast, 25 June 2026 (1st half)
- Most shots allowed in a match: 28 - v Ecuador, 20 June 2026
- Most shots allowed in one half: 19 - v Ecuador, 20 June 2026 (2nd half)
- Fewest shots allowed in a match: 7 - v Ivory Coast, 25 June 2026
- Fewest shots allowed in a match: 3 - v Ivory Coast, 25 June 2026 (2nd half)
- Most shots by both teams in a match: 38 - v Ecuador, 20 June 2026
- Most shots by both teams in one half: 25 - v Ecuador, 20 June 2026 (2nd half)
- Fewest shots by both teams in a match: 18 - v Ivory Coast, 25 June 2026
- Fewest shots by both teams in one half: 8 - v Ivory Coast, 25 June 2026 (1st half)
- Most shots on target in a match: 3 - v Ecuador, 20 June 2026
- Most shots on target in one half: 3 - v Ecuador, 20 June 2026 (2nd half)
- Fewest shots on target in a match: 2 - (2 times)
  - v Germany, 14 June 2026
  - v Ivory Coast, 25 June 2026
- Fewest shots on target in one half: 1 - (5 times)
  - v Germany, 14 June 2026 (1st and 2nd half)
  - v Ecuador, 20 June 2026 (1st half)
  - v Ivory Coast, 25 June 2026 (1st and 2nd half)
- Most shots on target by a opponent in a match: 15 - v Ecuador, 20 June 2026
- Most shots on target by a opponent in a match: 9 - v Ecuador, 20 June 2026 (2nd half)
- Fewest shots on target by a opponent in a match: 3 - v Ivory Coast, 25 June 2026
- Fewest shots on target by a opponent in one half: 1 - v Ivory Coast, 25 June 2026 (1st half)
- Most shots on target by both teams in a match: 18 - v Ecuador, 20 June 2026
- Most shots on target by both teams in one half: 12 - v Ecuador, 20 June 2026 (2nd half)
- Fewest shots on target by both teams in a match: 5 - v Ivory Coast, 25 June 2026
- Fewest shots on target by both teams in one half: 2 - v Ivory Coast, 25 June 2026 (1st half)
- Most corners in a match: 4 - v Ivory Coast, 25 June 2026
- Fewest corners in a match: 0 - v Ecuador, 20 June 2026
- Most corners by a opponent in a match: 9 - v Ecuador, 20 June 2026
- Fewest corners by a opponent in a match: 6 - v Ivory Coast, 25 June 2026
- Most corners by both teams in a match: 10 - v Ivory Coast, 25 June 2026
- Most corners by both teams in a match: 9 - (2 times)
  - v Germany, 14 June 2026
  - v Ecuador, 20 June 2026
- Most offside in a match: 2 - (2 times)
  - v Ecuador, 20 June 2026
  - v Ivory Coast, 25 June 2026
- Most offside by a opponent in a match: 1 - (2 times)
  - v Ecuador, 20 June 2026
  - v Ivory Coast, 25 June 2026
- Most offside by both teams in a match: 3 - (2 times)
  - v Ecuador, 20 June 2026
  - v Ivory Coast, 25 June 2026
- Fewest offside by both teams in a match: 1 - v Germany, 14 June 2026

== Competitive record ==
All competitive matches played from 1921 to 1958 were contested as the Territory of Curaçao (comprising all six islands of the Netherlands Antilles). From 1958 to 2010 all matches were contested as the Netherlands Antilles, successor of the Territory of Curaçao, (still comprising six islands until 1986, when Aruba seceded). All competitive fixtures after 2010 were contested by Curaçao, which solely consists of the island nation itself. Under the newly formed governing body, Curaçao have so far only competed in 2014, 2018 and 2022 FIFA World Cup qualification, 2012 Caribbean Cup qualification, the 2014 and 2017 Caribbean Cup, the 2017 CONCACAF Gold Cup, 2019 CONCACAF Gold Cup, and the ABCS Tournament.

=== FIFA World Cup ===
FIFA World Cup									Qualification					
Year	Round	Position	Pld	W	D*	L	GF	GA	Pld	W	D*	L	GF	GA
as (Colony of Curaçao and Dependencies) Territory of Curaçao									as (Colony of Curaçao and Dependencies) Territory of Curaçao					
(Uruguay) 1930	Not a FIFA member								Not a FIFA member					
(Italy) 1934	Did not enter								Did not enter					
(France) 1938	Did not enter								Did not enter					
(Brazil) 1950	Did not enter								Did not enter					
(Switzerland) 1954	Did not enter								Did not enter					
(Sweden) 1958	Did not qualify								3	1	0	2	4	7
as Netherlands Antilles									as Netherlands Antilles					
(Chile) 1962	Did not qualify								6	2	2	2	4	14
(England) 1966	Did not qualify								4	1	2	1	2	3
(Mexico) 1970	Did not qualify								4	1	0	3	3	9
(Germany) 1974	Did not qualify								5	0	2	3	4	19
(Argentina) 1978	Did not qualify								2	0	0	2	1	9
(Spain) 1982	Did not qualify								4	0	3	1	1	2
(Mexico) 1986	Did not qualify								2	0	1	1	0	4
(Italy) 1990	Did not qualify								4	2	0	2	4	7
(United States) 1994	Did not qualify								2	0	1	1	1	4
(France) 1998	Did not qualify								2	0	1	1	1	2
(South Korea) (Japan) 2002	Did not qualify								2	0	1	1	1	6
(Germany) 2006	Did not qualify								4	1	0	3	4	8
(South Africa) 2010	Did not qualify								4	2	1	1	3	1
as Curaçao									as Curaçao					
(Brazil) 2014	Did not qualify								6	2	1	3	15	15
(Russia) 2018	Did not qualify								6	1	3	2	5	6
(Qatar) 2022	Did not qualify								6	3	2	1	16	3
(Canada) (Mexico) (United States) 2026	Group stage	42nd	3	0	1	2	1	9	10	7	3	0	28	5
(Morocco) (Portugal) (Spain) 2030	To be determined								To be determined					
(Saudi Arabia) 2034	To be determined								To be determined					
Total:1/23	Group stage	42nd	3	0	1	2	1	9	76	23	23	30	97	124

*Draws include knockout matches decided via penalty shoot-out.

=== CONCACAF Gold Cup ===
CONCACAF Championship & Gold Cup record										Qualification record					
Year	Round	Position	Pld	W	D*	L	GF	GA	Squad	Pld	W	D*	L	GF	GA
as Netherlands Antilles
(El Salvador) 1963	Third place	3rd	8	5	0	3	14	9	Squad	2	2	0	0	4	1
(Guatemala) 1965	Fifth place	5th	5	0	2	3	4	16	Squad	Qualified automatically					
(Honduras) 1967	Did not qualify									4	0	2	2	4	6
(Costa Rica) 1969	Third place	3rd	5	2	1	2	9	12	Squad	Qualified automatically					
(Trinidad and Tobago) 1971	Did not enter									Did not enter					
(Haiti) 1973	Sixth place	6th	5	0	2	3	4	19	Squad	Qualified automatically					
(Mexico) 1977	Did not qualify									2	0	0	2	1	9
(Honduras) 1981	Did not qualify									4	0	3	1	1	2
1985	Did not qualify									2	0	1	1	0	4
1989	Did not qualify									4	2	0	2	4	7
(United States) 1991	Did not qualify									2	0	0	2	0	5
(United States) (Mexico) 1993	Did not enter									Did not enter					
(United States) 1996	Did not qualify									5	3	1	1	11	11
(United States) 1998	Did not qualify									1	0	0	1	1	2
(United States) 2000	Did not qualify									6	2	1	3	8	13
(United States) 2002	Did not enter									Did not enter					
(United States) (Mexico) 2003	Did not qualify									4	1	1	2	3	6
(United States) 2005	Withdrew									Withdrew					
(United States) 2007	Did not qualify									3	0	1	2	1	7
(United States) 2009	Did not qualify									5	1	1	3	5	11
as Curaçao
(United States) 2011	Did not qualify									3	0	1	2	5	7
(United States) 2013	Did not qualify									3	0	0	3	2	11
(United States) (Canada) 2015	Did not qualify									9	2	3	4	11	15
(United States) 2017	Group stage	11th	3	0	0	3	0	6	Squad	6	5	0	1	18	4
(United States) (Costa Rica) (Jamaica) 2019	Quarter-finals	8th	4	1	1	2	2	3	Squad	4	3	0	1	22	2
(United States) 2021	Withdrew									4	1	2	1	3	3
(United States) (Canada) 2023	Did not qualify									5	1	1	3	3	9
(United States) (Canada) 2025	Group stage	10th	3	0	2	1	2	3	Squad	6	4	1	1	15	3
Total	Third place	7/28	33	8	8	17	35	68	—	84	27	19	34	122	138

*Draws include knockout matches decided via penalty shoot-out.

Gold Cup history
First match	Curaçao 0–2 Jamaica (9 July 2017; San Diego, California, United States)
Biggest Win	Honduras 0–1 Curaçao (21 June 2019; Houston, Texas, United States)
Biggest Defeat	Curaçao 0–2 Jamaica (9 July 2017; San Diego, California, United States); El Salvador 2–0 Curaçao (13 July 2017; Denver, Colorado, United States); Curaçao 0–2 Mexico (17 July 2017; San Antonio, Texas, United States)
Best Result	Quarter-finals (2019)
Worst Result	Group stage (2017, 2025)

=== CONCACAF Nations League ===
CONCACAF Nations League record
League record										Finals record								
Season	Division	Group	Pld	W	D	L	GF	GA	P/R	Finals	Result	Pld	W	D	L	GF	GA	Squad
2019–20	A	D	4	1	2	1	3	3	Same position	(United States) 2021	Did not qualify							
2022–23	A	C	4	1	0	3	2	8	Same position	(United States) 2023	Did not qualify							
2023–24	A	A	4	1	0	3	6	7	▼	(United States) 2024	Did not qualify							
2024–25	B	B	6	4	1	1	15	3	▲	(United States) 2025	Did not qualify							
2026–27	A	A	4	3	1	0	12	5	Same position	(United States) 2027								
Total	—	—	24	10	5	8	38	26	—	Total	0 Titles	—	—	—	—	—	—	—

*Draws include knockout matches decided via penalty shoot-out.

CONCACAF Nations League history
First match	Curaçao 1–0 Haiti (7 September 2019; Willemstad, Curaçao)
Biggest Win	Saint Martin 0–5 Curaçao (15 November 2024; Willemstad, Curaçao)
Biggest Defeat	Canada 4–0 Curaçao (9 June 2022; Vancouver, Canada)
Best Result	—
Worst Result	—

=== CFU Caribbean Cup ===
CFU Championship & Caribbean Cup record									Qualification record					
Year	Result	Pld	W	D*	L	GF	GA	Squad	Pld	W	D*	L	GF	GA
as Netherlands Antilles									as Netherlands Antilles					
(Trinidad and Tobago) 1978	Did not qualify								4	1	1	2	1	5
(Suriname) 1979	Did not enter								Did not enter					
(Puerto Rico) 1981	Did not enter								Did not enter					
(French Guiana) 1983	Did not qualify								Result Unknown					
(Barbados) 1985	Did not enter								Did not enter					
(Martinique) 1988	Did not enter								Did not enter					
(Barbados) 1989	Group stage	2	0	2	0	2	2	-	4	3	0	1	21	4
(Trinidad and Tobago) 1990	Did not qualify								2	0	2	0	2	2
(Jamaica) 1991	Did not qualify								2	0	0	2	0	5
(Trinidad and Tobago) 1992	Did not qualify								3	1	1	1	3	3
(Jamaica) 1993	Did not enter								Did not enter					
(Trinidad and Tobago) 1994	Did not enter								Did not enter					
(Cayman Islands) (Jamaica) 1995	Did not qualify								5	3	1	1	11	11
(Trinidad and Tobago) 1996	Did not qualify								1	0	0	1	0	1
(Antigua and Barbuda) (Saint Kitts and Nevis) 1997	Did not qualify								1	0	0	1	1	2
(Jamaica) (Trinidad and Tobago) 1998	Group stage	3	0	0	3	2	9	-	3	2	1	0	6	4
(Trinidad and Tobago) 1999	Did not qualify								2	0	1	1	2	4
(Trinidad and Tobago) 2001	Did not enter								Did not enter					
(Barbados) 2005	Did not enter								Did not enter					
(Trinidad and Tobago) 2007	Did not qualify								3	0	1	2	1	7
(Jamaica) 2008	Did not qualify								5	1	1	3	5	11
(Martinique) 2010	Did not qualify								3	0	1	2	5	7
as Curaçao									as Curaçao					
(Jamaica) 2014	Group stage	3	0	0	3	5	10	Squad	6	2	3	1	6	5
(Martinique) 2017	Champions	2	2	0	0	4	2	Squad	6	4	1	1	21	6
Total	Champions	10	2	2	6	13	23	-	50	17	14	19	85	77

*Draws include knockout matches decided via penalty shoot-out.

=== ABCS Tournament ===
ABCS Tournament
Year	Result	GP	W	D*	L	GS	GA
(Curaçao) 2010	Runners-up	2	1	1	0	5	2
(Suriname) 2011	Fourth place	2	0	0	2	1	5
(Aruba) 2012	Third place	2	1	0	1	11	5
(Curaçao) 2013	Runners-up	2	1	0	1	3	3
(Suriname) 2015	Third place	2	1	1	0	4	1
(Curaçao) 2021	Champions	2	2	0	0	8	1
(Curaçao) 2022	Champions	2	0	2	0	4	4
Total	Champions	14	6	4	4	36	21

*Draws include knockout matches decided on penalty kicks.

== All-time record against other nations ==
As of 15 November 2026

=== Curaçao (2011–present) ===
The following matches were played as Curaçao (from 18 August 2011 until present)

Team	Pld	W	D	L
Antigua and Barbuda	4	1	0	3
Argentina	1	0	0	1
Aruba	6	4	1	1
Australia	1	0	0	1
Bahrain	1	0	0	1
Barbados	2	1	0	1
Bermuda	2	2	0	0
Bolivia	2	1	1	0
Bonaire	3	2	1	0
British Virgin Islands	1	1	0	0
Canada	4	0	1	3
China	1	0	0	1
Costa Rica	3	1	1	1
Cuba	4	1	2	1
Dominican Republic	3	1	0	2
Ecuador	1	0	1	0
El Salvador	8	0	4	4
French Guiana	2	0	1	1
Germany	1	0	0	1
Grenada	4	3	1	0
Guadeloupe	2	2	0	0
Guatemala	1	0	1	0
Guyana	2	1	0	1
Haiti	5	2	2	1
Honduras	3	1	0	2
India	1	1	0	0
Indonesia	2	0	0	2
Ivory Coast	1	0	0	1
Jamaica	4	2	2	1
Kazakhstan	1	0	0	1
Martinique	2	1	1	0
Mexico	1	0	0	1
Montserrat	2	1	1	0
New Zealand	1	0	0	1
Nicaragua	2	1	1	0
Panama	4	0	2	2
Puerto Rico	2	1	1	0
Qatar	1	1	0	0
Saint Kitts and Nevis	1	0	0	1
Saint Lucia	5	3	0	2
Saint Martin	2	2	0	0
Saint Vincent and the Grenadines	3	1	0	2
Scotland	1	0	0	1
Suriname	6	2	1	3
Trinidad and Tobago	6	2	3	1
U.S. Virgin Islands	4	4	0	0
Vietnam	1	0	1	0
United States	1	0	0	1
Total	120	46	29	45

== Team records ==
=== Wins ===
Largest win

- 10–0 vs Grenada on 10 September 2018

Largest win at the CONCACAF Gold Cup

- 1-0 vs Honduras on 21 June 2019, 2019 CONCACAF Gold Cup

Largest win at the CONCACAF Championship finals

- 4–1 vs Honduras on 7 April 1963, 1963 CONCACAF Championship

Largest win at the Caribbean Cup finals

- 2–1 vs Martinique on 22 June 2017, 2017 Caribbean Cup
- 2–1 vs Jamaica on 25 June 2017, 2017 Caribbean Cup

Largest win at the ABCS Tournament

- 9–2 vs Bonaire on 15 July 2012, ABCS Tournament 2012

=== Draws ===
Highest scoring draw

- 2–2 vs Suriname on 25 September 2011, Friendly
- 2–2 vs Haiti on 11 October 2011, 2014 FIFA World Cup qualification
- 2–2 vs Puerto Rico on 3 September 2014, 2014 Caribbean Cup qualification

Highest scoring draw at the FIFA World Cup

- 0–0 vs Ecuador on 20 June 2026, 2026 FIFA World Cup

Highest scoring draw at the ABCS Tournament

- 2–2 vs Suriname on 31 October 2010, 2010 ABCS Tournament
- 2–2 vs Aruba on 24 November 2022, 2022 ABCS Tournament
- 2–2 vs Suriname on 26 November 2022, 2022 ABCS Tournament

Highest scoring draw at the CONCACAF Gold Cup

- 1–1 vs Jamaica on 25 June 2019, 2019 CONCACAF Gold Cup
- 1–1 vs Canada on 22 June 2025, 2025 CONCACAF Gold Cup

=== Defeats ===
Largest defeat

- 7–0 vs Argentina on 28 March 2023, Friendly

Largest defeat at the FIFA World Cup
7–1 vs Germany on 15 June 2026, 2026 FIFA World Cup
Largest defeat at the CONCACAF Gold Cup
0–2 vs Jamaica on 9 July 2017, 2017 CONCACAF Gold Cup

- 0–2 vs on 13 July 2017, 2017 CONCACAF Gold Cup
- 0–2 vs on 17 July 2017, 2017 CONCACAF Gold Cup

Largest defeat at the Caribbean Cup finals

- 4–1 vs on 15 November 2014, 2014 Caribbean Cup

Largest defeat at the ABCS Tournament

- 3–1 vs Bonaire on 2 December 2011, ABCS Tournament 2011
- 3–1 vs Suriname on 16 November 2013, ABCS Tournament 2013
- 2–0 vs Suriname on 4 December 2011, ABCS Tournament 2011

== Honours ==
=== Continental ===
- CONCACAF Championship
  - (bronze) Third place (2): 1963^{2}, 1969^{2}

=== Regional ===
- CCCF Championship^{3}
  - (silver) Runners-up (3): 1955^{1}, 1957^{1}, 1960^{2}
  - (bronze) Third place (1): 1941^{1}
- Caribbean Cup
  - (gold) Champions (1): 2017
- Central American and Caribbean Games
  - (bronze) Bronze medal (1): 1946^{1}

=== Friendly ===
- ABCS Tournament (2): 2021, 2022
- Four-Nations Tournament (1): 1944^{1}
- Phillip Seaga Cup (1): 1963^{2}
- Inter Expo Cup / Polar Cup (1): 2004^{2}
- Parbo Bier Cup (1): 2004^{2}
- King's Cup (1): 2019

=== Summary ===
Only official honours are included, according to FIFA statutes (competitions organized/recognized by FIFA or an affiliated confederation).

Competition	1st place, gold medalist(s)	2nd place, silver medalist(s)	3rd place, bronze medalist(s)	Total
CONCACAF Championship	0	0	2	2
CCCF Championship^{3}	0	3	1	4
Total	0	3	3	6

Notes

1. Honours won as Curaçao.
2. Honours won as Netherlands Antilles.
3. Official regional competition organized by CCCF. It was a predecessor confederation of CONCACAF, affiliated with FIFA as the former governing body of football in Central America and Caribbean, from 1938 to 1961.

== See also ==
- Territory of Curaçao national football team (1921–1958)
- Netherlands Antilles national football team (1958–2010)
