= Jesús María Araya =

Costa Rican footballer

Personal information
- Position: Forward

Senior career*
Years	Team	Apps	(Gls)
- Orión

International career
1941–1946	Costa Rica	9	(11)
- * Club domestic league appearances and goals

Jesús María "Pato" Araya Soto (22 April 1916 - 17 September 1994) was a Costa Rican football player, born in San José. He earned the nickname "Pato" for his peculiar way of running.

Champion of the First Division in 1938 after winning the cup tournament, and obtained his first first division scepter after beating Liga Deportiva Alajuelense, President Ricardo Saprissa Ayma.

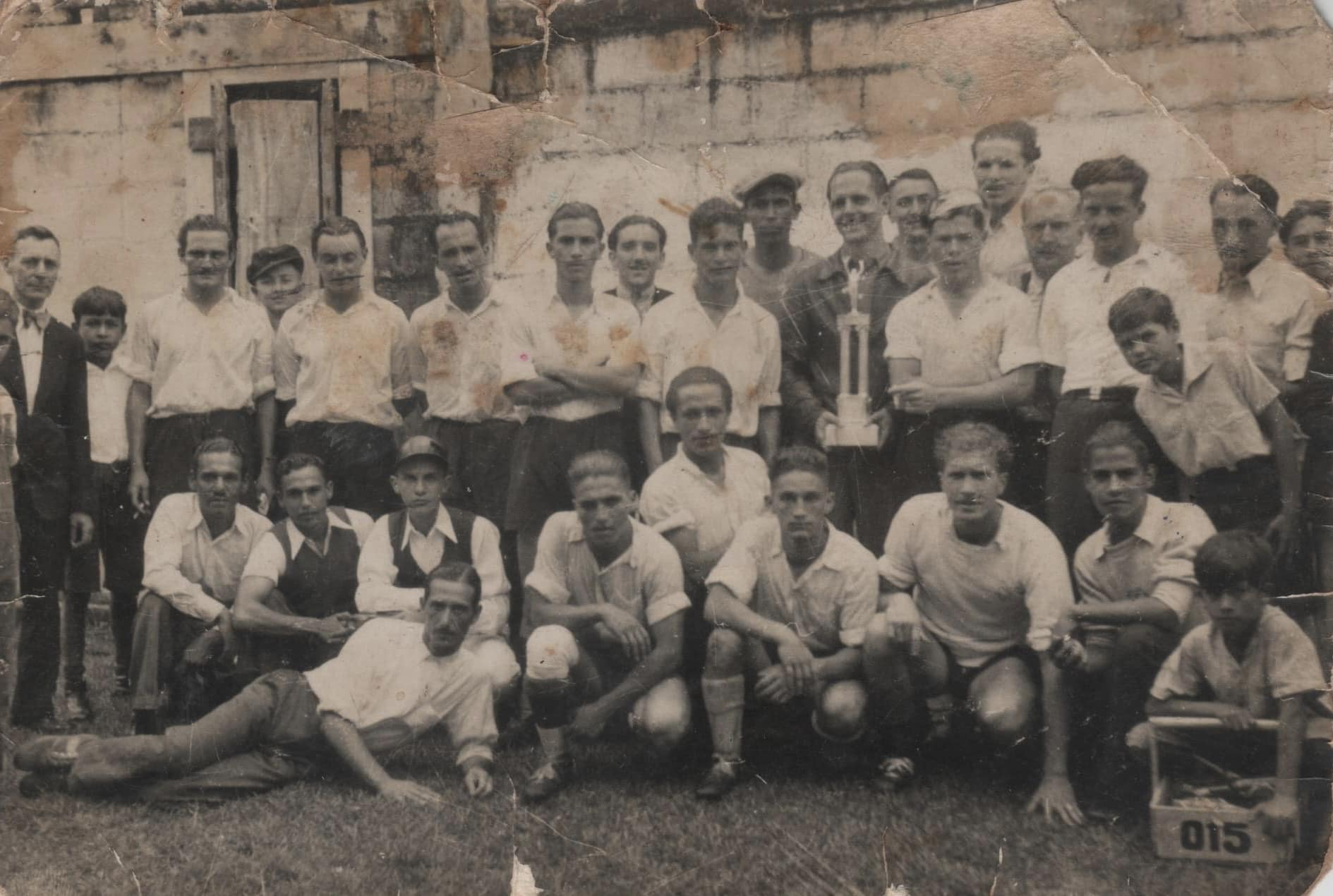
Enrique Umaña, Juan Tellini, Carlos Silva Loaiza, Claudio Gómez, Ubaldo Cháves, José Monge, Numa Ruiz, Victor Valerín, Walker Rodríguez, Carlos Robles, Carlos Muñoz, Armando Calleza, Oscar Rodríguez, Oscar Bolaños, Manuel Jiménez, Jesús " Pato "Araya, Alfredo Chacón, Jorge Lozano, Israel Delgado, Eugenio Jiménez, Jesús Jiménez, Alejandro Arguedas, Alfredo Piedra, Guido Pidera, Miguel Matamoros and Miguel Bolaños, President Ricardo Saprissa Ayma

Being a young player of Orion FC, he was summoned by coach Alejandro Morera Soto, to Costa Rica national football team between 1941 and 1946 scoring 11 goals in nine games (with an average of 1.22 goals per game), his first call was to play the First Central American and Caribbean Championship, which took place at the former National Stadium of Costa Rica from May 8 to 18, 1941.

On Saturday, May 10, 1941, the National Stadium received the first game of the competition for Costa Ricans and Nicaraguans. 3 colones in box, 2 in shadow and one in sun were the prices set. The Phoenix S.A. Bus service, known as Los Plateados, gave the fans transport to the stadium for 10 cents the race.

At 10:00 a.m. he started the crash, with the attendance in President Dr. Rafael Ángel Calderón Guardia. The contest had only one team that dominated the other overwhelmingly, the nervousness of facing the local eleven, encouraged by a full stadium, generated that the first two of the Tricolor were pinoleros autogoers, by Abraham Rocha and Humberto Martínez.

Being a young player from Orión F.C., he was summoned by coach Alejandro Morera Soto to play in the first Central American and Caribbean Championship, which was held in the old National Stadium of Costa Rica from May 8 to 18 the 1941.

Araya was one of the top scorers in the tournament. In the opening game, Araya scored a hattrick, scoring to make it 3-0, 4-0 and 5-0; the game ended 7-2. Costa Rica went on to win the Championship.

Outside of football, he worked as a painter.

== Career statistics ==
=== International ===
Appearances and goals by national team and year
National team	Year	Apps	Goals
Costa Rica	1941	4	7
Costa Rica	1946	5	4
Total		9	11

=== International goals ===
Scores and results list Costa Rica's goal tally first, score column indicates score after each Costa Rica goal.

List of international goals scored by Araya
No.	Date	Venue	Opponent	Score	Result	Competition
1	11 May 1941	Costa Rica	Panama	3–0	7–2	1941 CCCF Championship
2	11 May 1941	Costa Rica	Panama	4–0	7–2	1941 CCCF Championship
3	11 May 1941	Costa Rica	Panama	5–0	7–2	1941 CCCF Championship
4	13 May 1941	Costa Rica	Curaçao	?–?	6–2	1941 CCCF Championship
5	13 May 1941	Costa Rica	Curaçao	?–?	6–2	1941 CCCF Championship
6	18 May 1941	Costa Rica	El Salvador	1–0	3–1	1941 CCCF Championship
7	18 May 1941	Costa Rica	El Salvador	3–1	3–1	1941 CCCF Championship
8	10 December 1946	Estadio Municipal, Barranquilla, Colombia	Puerto Rico	?–0	12–0	1946 Central American and Caribbean Games
9	10 December 1946	Estadio Municipal, Barranquilla, Colombia	Puerto Rico	?–0	12–0	1946 Central American and Caribbean Games
10	10 December 1946	Estadio Municipal, Barranquilla, Colombia	Puerto Rico	?–0	12–0	1946 Central American and Caribbean Games
11	14 December 1946	Estadio Municipal, Barranquilla, Colombia	Venezuela	3–0	4–2	1946 Central American and Caribbean Games
