= Fello Meza =

Costa Rican footballer (1920-1988)

Personal information
- Full name: José Rafael Meza Ivancovich
- Date of birth: 6 July 1920
- Place of birth: Cartago, Costa Rica
- Date of death: 15 July 1988 (aged 68)
- Place of death: San José, Costa Rica
- Height: 1.75 m (5 ft 9 in)
- Position: Forward

Youth career
- Ciclón Negro
- Cartaginés

Senior career*
Years	Team	Apps	(Gls)
1937–1941	Cartaginés		
1941	Moctezuma	12	(21)
1941–1944	Estudiantes		(33)
1944–1945	Moctezuma		(21)
1945–1948	Atlante		(103)
1949	Moctezuma		(19)
1950	University of Bogotá	8	(8)
1951–1952	Cartaginés		
1955	Cartaginés		
1956	Herediano		

International career
1941–1951	Costa Rica	7	(11)

Managerial career
- 1951–1952: Cartaginés
- 1952: Aduana de Tela
- Aduana de Tela
- Herediano
- Limón
- Turrialba
- San Carlos
- Moctezuma
- Golfito
- Municipal Pérez Zeledón
- Municipal Puntarenas
- Paraíso Total
- * Club domestic league appearances and goals

José Rafael Meza Ivancovich (6 July 1920 – 15 July 1988), better known as Fello Meza, was a Costa Rican footballer who represented the Costa Rica national football team between 1941 and 1951, scoring eleven goals in seven games. Regarded as one of the greatest Costa Rican footballers of all time, Meza scored over three hundred goals in a twenty-year career.

== Early and personal life ==
Meza was born in Cartago, Costa Rica, to Rafaela Ivankovich Fernández, whose godparents were the parents of Costa Rican president Francisco Orlich Bolmarcich, and Francisco Meza Garci. His maternal grandparents were Nicolás Ivankovich Trojanovich, a Croat-Yugoslavian immigrant who arrived in Costa Rica in 1874, and Costa Rican Camila Fernández Ruíz. He married Lidia Montoya in 1941, and the pair had twelve children.

He was the fifth of seven siblings, including fellow footballer Jaime Meza, who played alongside him in Costa Rica and Mexico.

== Club career ==
=== Early career in Costa Rica ===
Meza took an interest in football from a young age, after his father brought him a football at the age of five. Having played on the streets of Plaza Iglesias in Cartago, and earning an article in sports magazine Olimpia in 1933, he joined the academy of Ciclón Negro the following year. He joined top flight side Cartaginés, and was called up to the first team for the first time in 1937, at the age of sixteen, going on to make his debut against Herediano.

After an unassuming first season, he faced Atlético Corrales in a match the following year, eventually rejecting an offer to move to the Venezuelan side. Having initially started as a right-midfielder, Meza was moved to centre-forward after the arrival of new club captain Raúl Pacheco in 1940. The same year, he made his first major mark in Costa Rican football; in the final of the 1940 Championship, Meza's two goals helped side side overcome a 2–0 scoreline against Herediano, as Cartaginés went on to win 4–3.

Having finished as the league's top scorer in 1940 with seventeen goals, despite only playing in eight games due to injury, Meza caught the attention of Mexican side Club América, after playing against them in a match. Club América offered him a contract of $150 a month, a considerable amount for a footballer in the time, and having also played against them in a friendly, Argentinian club Estudiantes de La Plata also offered him a deal. Both these deals were cancelled after intervention from the Costa Rican Football Federation, who wanted Meza to represent the nation at the 1941 CCCF Championship.

=== Moves to Mexico and Argentina ===
At the conclusion of the competition, Meza was offered deals by Mexican clubs Real Club España, Club América and Moctezuma de Orizaba. He opted to join Moctezuma, who offered him a monthly wage of $200, and scored twenty-one goals in twelve games in his first season, despite suffering with appendicitis.

Following these stellar performances, he was again offered a contract with Argentinian side Estudiantes, and made his unofficial debut with the club in October 1941, scoring three goals in a tournament involving Racing Club, Huracán and Chacarita. He scored a total of thirty-three goals over the 1942 and 1943 seasons, before returning to Mexico and re-joining Moctezuma in a deal worth $10,000. En route to Mexico, he played in a friendly match for former club Cartaginés against Alajuelense.

Despite again suffering with illness, Meza finished the 1944–45 season as his club's top scorer, with twenty-one goals. He played the next season with Atlante, scoring thirty-five goals as his side finished the league in second place. With Atlante, he scored a goal later compared to Argentine Diego Maradona's "Goal of the century" against Asturias on 26 May 1946. His last season in Mexico was spent with Moctezuma, scoring nineteen times.

=== Later playing career ===
Meza moved to Colombia for the 1950 season, joining the University of Bogotá side that featured seven other Costa Ricans. Having suffered a serious knee injury, he only managed to play in eight official games, scoring eight goals.

Having returned to Costa Rica to recover from the injury, he re-joined boyhood club Cartaginés as a player-coach. He briefly moved to Honduras with Aduana de Tela, in a technical director role, helping the side win the 1952 Honduran Amateur League. Another season with Cartaginés followed, before another stint as coach of Aduana de Tela - though he did feature in an international match against Marianao de Cuba, scoring once, after the crowd insisted he play.

After a final season with Cartaginés in 1955, he joined Herediano, playing his final game for the club in a friendly on 6 January 1957 against Austrian side Rapid Wien, notching either four or five assists in either a 7–2 or 7–0 win, according to different sources. Following his retirement, Cartaginés renamed their stadium in his honour, and he played for ten minutes in a friendly against Uruguayan side Liverpool in 1973, making an assist for Leonel Hernández in the 2–2 draw.

== International career ==
Meza first featured for Costa Rica at the 1941 CCCF Championship, hosted in San José, Costa Rica, where he finished top scorer with five goals and three goals against Panama and Curaçao, respectively. His next call up for the national team came ten years later, in the same competition, though he did not feature as his brother, Jaime, finished as one of the top scorers. Due to disciplinary issues, Meza, along with other members of the squad, was banned from the national team for two years, signalling an end to his international career.

== Death ==
Meza died at the age of sixty-eight on 15 July 1988 in San José.

== Career statistics ==
=== International ===
Appearances and goals by national team and year
National team	Year	Apps	Goals
Costa Rica	1941	3	8
Total		3	8

=== International goals ===
Scores and results list Costa Rica's goal tally first, score column indicates score after each Costa Rica goal.

List of international goals scored by Meza
No.	Date	Venue	Opponent	Score	Result	Competition
1	11 May 1941	Costa Rica	Panama	?–0	7–0	1941 CCCF Championship
2	11 May 1941	Costa Rica	Panama	?–0	7–0	1941 CCCF Championship
3	11 May 1941	Costa Rica	Panama	?–0	7–0	1941 CCCF Championship
4	11 May 1941	Costa Rica	Panama	?–0	7–0	1941 CCCF Championship
5	13 May 1941	Costa Rica	Curaçao	?–?	6–2	1941 CCCF Championship
6	13 May 1941	Costa Rica	Curaçao	?–?	6–2	1941 CCCF Championship
7	13 May 1941	Costa Rica	Curaçao	?–?	6–2	1941 CCCF Championship
8	18 May 1941	Costa Rica	El Salvador	1–0	3–1	1941 CCCF Championship
