= Hans Nahar =

Surinamese footballer (1910–1992)

Personal information
- Full name: Harry Isedor Adolf Nahar
- Date of birth: 6 September 1910
- Place of birth: Paramaribo, Suriname
- Date of death: 24 October 1992 (aged 82)
- Place of death: Paramaribo, Suriname
- Position: Forward

Youth career
- 1918-1927: Saramaccastraat

Senior career*
Years	Team	Apps	(Gls)
1927	Go Ahead		
1927-1934	MYOB		
1934	Voorwaarts	7	(7)
1935-1938	PVV		
1946-	V.V. Aruba Juniors		

International career
1934-1937	Suriname (S.V.B.)	13	(11)
1931–1946	Suriname (N.G.V.B)	20	(24)
1941	Curaçao	8	(11)
1946–1950	Aruba	4	(2)
- * Club domestic league appearances and goals

Hans Nahar (6 September 1910 – 24 October 1992) was a Surinamese footballer who played as a striker. Nahar represented 3 different countries over the course of his 19-year international career.

== Early life ==
Harry came from a family that did reasonably well: his father was an accountant which was a great job at the time. Harry, 'Hans' for football fans, grew up in Albina for a large part of his life with two brothers and four sisters. Even as a child, Hans would kick anything in sight, including cobblestones. His parents' biggest concern was his shoes which would have to be repaired several times. When Hans was still a boy, there were very few sports fields available in Suriname. Young football players had no choice but to use the yard or the street as a football field. Hans started his footballing career at the age of 8 in 1918, for the team Saramaccastraat.

== Club career ==
Hans played for Go Ahead in 1927, which was his first senior club. Aged 17, he played against the strong team of Everton from Demerara. Hans swiftly moved to MYOB, who were part for the Catholic Football Association (CFA). He played for MYOB for 7 years before returning to the SFA.

Hans Nahar turned out for Voorwaarts in the 1934 SVB Eerste Divisie. He scored 7 times in 7 games in his debut season. The next year, he created the record for the most goals scored in one game in the SVB Eerste Divisie. Nahar scored 7 goals in an 11–1 triumph over DRD, but this time playing for P.V.V. Nahar continued to play for P.V.V. until 1939, when, upon getting a new job in Curaçao, he played football for them.

== International career ==
Hans Nahar represented 3 countries over the course of his 19-year international career. All three federations concerned, considered their games to be classed as full internationals, and the same applied to their matches against representations from Guyana and Trinidad and Tobago, which at the time were part of the British Empire and had not obtained FIFA membership until the 1960s. In addition, numerous line-ups for matches Curaçao, Suriname and Aruba, during Nahar's playing career, reports of the games are scarce, so his figures for each country may rise. According to Surinamese sources, Nahar represented his nation on 70 occasions, 30 times for the official S.V.B. and 40 times for the catholic N.G.V.B. federation.

In 1941, Nahar represented Curaçao in the inaugural edition of the 1941 CCCF Championship. Nahar scored 8 goals during the tournament, meaning he was the joint top scorer, alongside José Rafael Meza.
