= Four-Nations Tournament (1944) =

1944 Four-Nations Tournament
Tournament details
- Host country: Curaçao
- Dates: April 1 – April 10
- Teams: 4 (from 2 confederations)
- Venue(s): 1 (in 1 host city)

Final positions
- Champions: (Netherlands) Curaçao
- Runners-up: Venezuela
- Third place: (Netherlands) Aruba
- Fourth place: Haiti

Tournament statistics
- Matches played: 6
- Goals scored: 23 (3.83 per match)
- Top scorer(s): (Venezuela) Casco (4 goals)

The Four-Nations Tournament was an exhibition international football competition which featured national football teams from North America (Caribbean) and South America which was held in April 1944. All matches were played in Willemstad, Curaçao, where four teams played in a round-robin competition at Rif Stadium. The host nation Curaçao emerged as winners of the tournament.

== Players ==
The "Venezuela” national team included four Argentinians (Casco, Mariscotti, Ruíz Díaz and Taiolli) and two Cubans (García Pelayo and Yarritu).

The Haiti national team included notable centerforward Joseph Gaetjens, who would later score for the United States in their 1–0 upset win over England at the 1950 FIFA World Cup.

== Rules ==
Teams earned two points for a win and one point for a tie. Goal difference was the first tiebreaker, than goal average. In case of injury, substitutions were only allowed during the first half and subject to the approval of the opponents’ captain.

== Results ==
April 1, 1944

Aruba (Netherlands)	1–3	Venezuela
Wout 15' (pen.)		Ruíz Díaz 57'; Casco 69'; Casco 71'

Rif Stadium, Willemstad
Referee: Walther van Rosberg (Curaçao)

April 2, 1944

Curaçao (Netherlands)	5–0	Haiti
Boyé 20'; F. Jansen 65'; F. Jansen 75'; Hernandes ?'; Heiliger 89'

Rif Stadium, Willemstad
Referee: G. Rosario

April 5, 1944

Venezuela	2–0	Haiti
Pelayo 20'; Casco 67'

Rif Stadium, Willemstad
Referee: L. C. Zonruiter (Curaçao)

April 8, 1944

Aruba (Netherlands)	1–1	Haiti
Loopstok ?'		Rouzier 90'

Rif Stadium, Willemstad
Referee: L. C. Zonruiter (Curaçao)

April 9, 1944

Curaçao (Netherlands)	3–3	Venezuela
Pardo 5'; Boyé ?'; Pardo 89' (pen.)		Casco 15'; Taiolli ?' (pen.); Pelayo ?'

Rif Stadium, Willemstad
Referee: Walther van Rosberg (Curaçao)

April 10, 1944

Curaçao (Netherlands)	3–1	(Netherlands) Aruba
Pardo ?' (pen.); Boyé ?'; Unknown Aruba player ?' (o.g.)		Orman ?'

Rif Stadium, Willemstad
Referee: Walther van Rosberg (Curaçao)

== Table ==
	Team	Pld	W	D	L	GF	GA	GD	Pts
1	(Netherlands) Curaçao	3	2	1	0	11	4	+7	5
2	Venezuela	3	2	1	0	8	4	+4	5
3	(Netherlands) Aruba	3	0	1	2	3	7	-4	1
4	Haiti	3	0	1	2	1	8	-7	1
