= 1957 CCCF Championship =

Tournament details
- Host country: Netherlands Antilles
- Dates: 11–25 August
- Teams: 5
- Venue(s): Ergilio Hato Stadium, Willemstad

Final positions
- Champions: Haiti (1st title)
- Runners-up: Curaçao
- Third place: Honduras
- Fourth place: Panama

Tournament statistics
- Matches played: 10
- Goals scored: 31 (3.1 per match)
- Top scorer: (Haiti) Phenol Charles (8 goals)
- Best player: (Cuba) Francisco Torrent

The 1957 CCCF Championship was the eighth international association football championship for members of the Confederación Centroamericana y del Caribe de Fútbol (CCCF). Hosted by Curaçao in the newly formed Netherlands Antilles, the competition ran from 11–25 August 1957 and was contested by the national teams of Cuba, Curaçao, Haiti, Honduras and Panama.

Debutants Haiti won the competition for the first time. In the final matches of the round-robin tournament, they were crowned champions after completing a clean and winning all of their matches by defeating Cuba 6–1.

== Background ==
The Confederación Centroamericana y del Caribe de Fútbol (CCCF) was founded in 1938. Along with the North American Football Confederation (NAFC), it was a precursor organisation to the Confederation of North, Central America and Caribbean Association Football (CONCACAF). Within three years of its founding, the CCCF organised a contest for its member associations.

Although the competition was hosted in the then newly constituted nation of the Netherlands Antilles, the national team of would not adopted the new nation's name for another year. It would continue to compete as Curaçao until after qualifying for the 1958 FIFA World Cup.

Costa Rica were two-time defending champions after they successfully retained the trophy in 1955. They were the most successful team in the competition's history having won five of the seven editions to date. However, they would be unable to retain their title as they withdrew from the competition before it began for financial reasons.

Shortly before the competition began, Guatemala also withdrew after a national state of emergency was declared following the assassination of President Carlos Castillo Armas.

== Format ==
The tournament was played as a round-robin where each team would play all of the others once. The winner would be decided by the total number of points obtained across all matches played.

== Participants ==
- Cuba
- Curaçao (hosts)
- Haiti
- Honduras
- Panama

== Referees ==
Three referees were used during the tournament:

- (England) Arthur Ellis
- (Spain) Juan Gardeazábal
- (Italy) Vincenzo Orlandini

== Venue ==
All matches were held at the Ergilio Hato Stadium in Willemstad.

Willemstad
Ergilio Hato Stadium
Capacity: 15,000
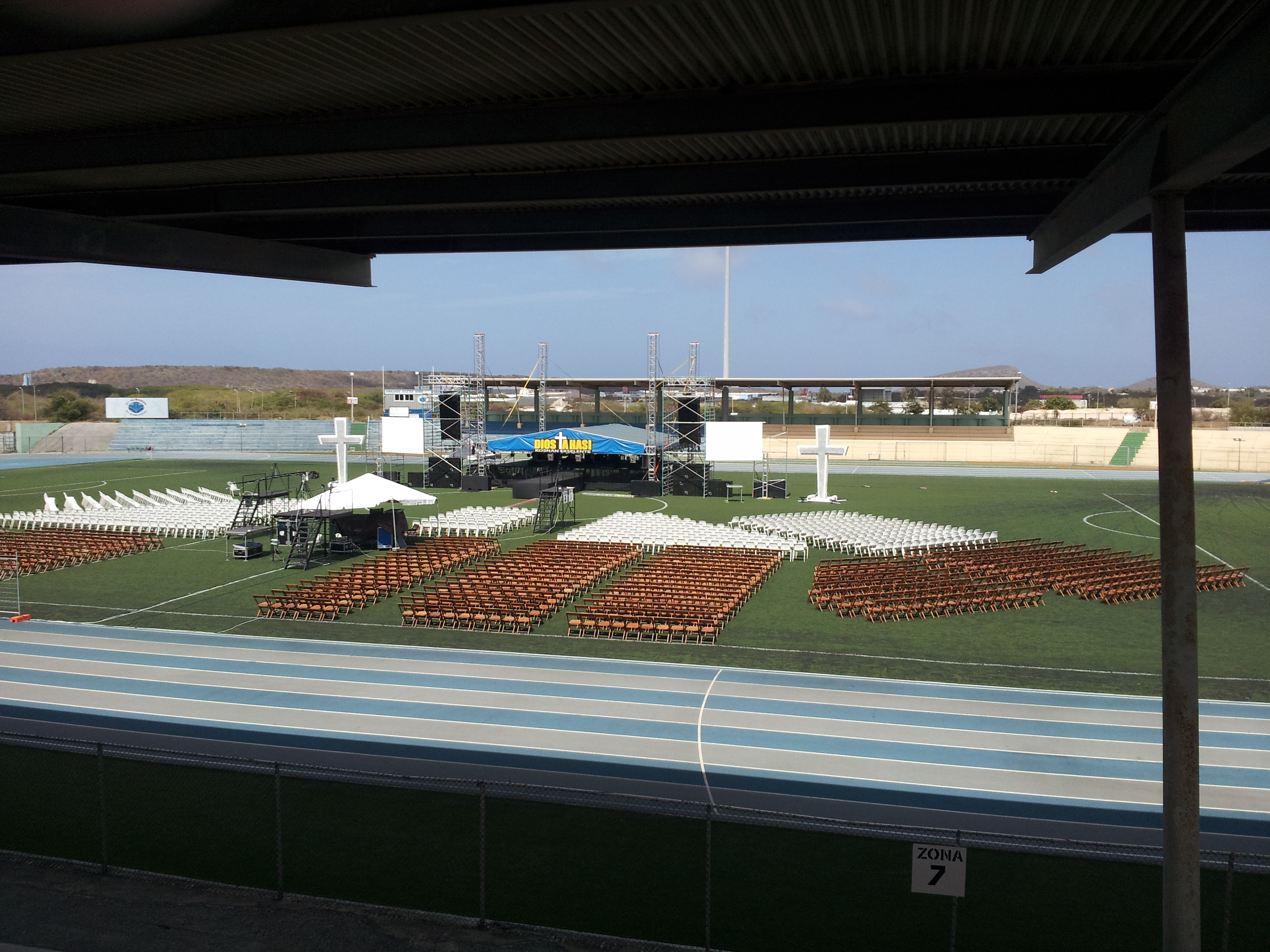

== Summary ==
The competition began on 11 August when a brace from Fernando Zelaya helped Honduras to a 2–1 win against Panama. Two days later, Curaçao defeated Haiti 3–1. On 14 August, Panama recorded their first win of the competition by defeating Cuba 1–0. Two days later, Haiti defeated Honduras 2–1 to go top of the table. On 18 August, Curaçao defeated Cuba 2–0. At the halfway stage, Haiti led the standings on four points, two clear of Curaçao, Honduras and Panama.

The following day, a Phenol Charles brace helped Haiti to a 3–1 win against Panama. On 21 August, Honduras defeated Cuba 2–0 and Curaçao defeated Panama 3–0. In the final matches two days later, Phenol scored a hat-trick as Haiti defeated Cuba 6–1 to secure the title. Curaçao and Honduras drew 1–1.

== Table ==
Pos	Team	Pld	W	D	L	GF	GA	GAv	Pts
1	Haiti	4	4	0	0	14	4	3.500	8
2	Curaçao	4	2	1	1	7	4	1.750	5
3	Honduras	4	2	1	1	6	4	1.500	5
4	Panama	4	1	0	3	3	8	0.375	2
5	Cuba	4	0	0	4	1	11	0.091	0

== Results ==
11 August 1957

Honduras	2–1	Panama
Zelaya 9', 42'		Rodríguez 85'

Ergilio Hato Stadium, Willemstad
13 August 1957

Haiti	3–1	Curaçao
Fenol 27', 72'; Tassy 57'		Gómez 85'

Ergilio Hato Stadium, Willemstad

14 August 1957

Panama	1–0	Cuba
Deanes 83'

Ergilio Hato Stadium, Willemstad
16 August 1957

Haiti	2–1	Honduras
Fenol 20'; Tassy 40'		Suazo 29'

Ergilio Hato Stadium, Willemstad

18 August 1957

Curaçao	2–0	Cuba
Schoop 27'; R. de Lannoy 44'

Ergilio Hato Stadium, Willemstad
19 August 1957

Haiti	3–1	Panama
Fenol 23', 57'; Roc 83'		Deanes 22'

Ergilio Hato Stadium, Willemstad

21 August 1957

Honduras	2–0 (abandoned)	Cuba
Leaky 9'; Suazo 67'

Ergilio Hato Stadium, Willemstad
21 August 1957

Curaçao	3–0	Panama
Sambo 40'; Bibiana 55'; W. de Lannoy 72'

Ergilio Hato Stadium, Willemstad

23 August 1957

Haiti	6–1	Cuba
Fenol 1', 47', 72'; Tassy 24'; Bovil 67'; Delpeche 87'		Carmona 80'

Ergilio Hato Stadium, Willemstad
25 August 1957

Curaçao	1–1	Honduras
Canword 16'		Ramírez 69'

Ergilio Hato Stadium, Willemstad

== All-Star Team ==
Team of the tournament
Goalkeeper	Defenders	Midfielders	Forwards
(Colony of Curaçao and Dependencies) Celso Polinet	(Colony of Curaçao and Dependencies) Pedro Matrona; (Cuba) Francisco Torrent; (Colony of Curaçao and Dependencies) Wilfred De Lannoy	(Honduras) Fausto Shan; (Haiti) Gérard Blaise	(Panama) Jorge Deanes; (Haiti) Antoine Tassy; (Haiti) Phenol Charles; (Honduras) Fernando Zelaya; (Haiti) Pierre Roc
