= Deveron Fonville =

Dutch-Curaçaoan footballer (born 2003)

Personal information
- Full name: Deveron Lenny Fonville
- Date of birth: 16 May 2003 (age 23)
- Place of birth: Nieuwegein, Netherlands
- Height: 1.78 m (5 ft 10 in)
- Positions: Left-back; defender

Team information
- Current team: NEC
- Number: 24

Youth career
- –2011: VVIJ
- 2011–2019: PSV
- 2019–2022: Utrecht

Senior career*
| Years | Team | Apps | (Gls) |
| 2022 | Jong Utrecht | 1 | (0) |
| 2023–2024 | Hercules | 34 | (2) |
| 2024–2025 | IJsselmeervogels | 27 | (1) |
| 2025 | Dordrecht | 4 | (0) |
| 2025– | NEC | 35 | (0) |

International career^{‡}
| 2026– | Curaçao | 5 | (0) |
- * Club domestic league appearances and goals as of 25 October 2026 ‡ National team caps and goals as of 25 June 2026

Deveron Lenny Fonville (born 16 May 2003) is a professional footballer who plays as a defender for Eredivisie club NEC Nijmegen. Born in the Netherlands, he plays for the Curaçao national team.

== Club career ==
Born in Nieuwegein, Netherlands, Fonville is from neighboring IJsselstein and began his youth career with local side VVIJ. He played in the youth academy of PSV Eindhoven from 2011 to 2019 before joining the FC Utrecht academy. Fonville made his debut in the Eerste Divisie for Jong FC Utrecht as a substitute against FC Volendam on 4 February 2022. Persistent injuries caused him to miss a year of football and he returned to the game at USV Hercules.

After playing one season of amateur football for IJsselmeervogels in 2024–25, Fonville signed for FC Dordrecht back in the Eerste Divisie ahead of the 2025–26 season. Playing for Dordrecht under manager Dirk Kuyt, he made his debut in a 1–0 win over SC Cambuur on 8 August 2025.

Having impressed in four games for Dordrecht, Fonville joined Eredivisie club NEC Nijmegen in September 2025. He made his debut in the Eredivisie against PSV Eindhoven on 13 September 2025, in a 5–3 home defeat.

== International career ==
Fonville was called up to the Curaçao national football team for the 2026 FIFA World Cup qualification matches against Bermuda and Jamaica on 13 and 18 November 2025.

On 18 May 2026, Fonville was named in Curaçao's final roster for the 2026 FIFA World Cup. He made his senior international debut later that month in a World Cup warm-up match, starting in a 4–1 loss to Scotland at Hampden Park on 30 May.

== Personal life ==
His brother, Tyrone, is also a footballer; they have both played for USV Hercules.

== Career statistics ==
=== Club ===
As of match played 25 October 2026

Appearances and goals by club, season and competition
| Club | Season | League | | | Cup | | Europe | | Other | | Total | |
| Club | Season | Division | Apps | Goals | Apps | Goals | Apps | Goals | Apps | Goals | Apps | Goals |
|---|---|---|---|---|---|---|---|---|---|---|---|---|
| Jong Utrecht | 2021–22 | Eerste Divisie | 1 | 0 | — | | — | | — | | 1 | 0 |
| USV Hercules | 2023–24 | Derde Divisie | 34 | 1 | 5 | 1 | — | | 2 (Note: Appearances in promotion play-offs) | 0 | 41 | 2 |
| IJsselmeervogels | 2024–25 | Derde Divisie | 27 | 1 | 3 | 0 | — | | — | | 30 | 1 |
| Dordrecht | 2025–26 | Eerste Divisie | 4 | 0 | — | | — | | — | | 4 | 0 |
| NEC | 2025–26 | Eredivisie | 29 | 0 | 5 | 0 | — | | — | | 34 | 0 |
| NEC | 2026–27 | Eredivisie | 6 | 0 | 0 | 0 | 6 (Note: Four appearances in UEFA Champions League, two appearances in UEFA Europa League) | 0 | — | | 12 | 0 |
| NEC | Total | | 35 | 0 | 5 | 0 | 6 | 0 | — | | 46 | 0 |
| Career total | | | 101 | 2 | 13 | 1 | 6 | 0 | 2 | 0 | 122 | 3 |

=== International ===
As of match played 25 June 2026

Appearances and goals by national team and year
| National team | Year | Apps | Goals |
|---|---|---|---|
| Curaçao | 2026 | 5 | 0 |
| Total | | 5 | 0 |
