= Phenol Charles =

Haitian footballer

Personal information
- Date of birth: Haiti
- Position: Forward

Senior career*
Years	Team	Apps	(Gls)
- Aigle Noir du Bel-Air

International career
1953–1957	Haiti	10	(16)
- * Club domestic league appearances and goals

Phenol Charles is a former Haitian international football player. He is best known for scoring a hat-trick in the 1957 CCCF Championship match against Cuba in a 6-1 victory. The game was Haiti's final game of the Championship and the victory saw Haiti become the first Caribbean nation to win the title.
