= 1941 CCCF Championship =

Tournament details
- Host country: Costa Rica
- Dates: 8–18 May
- Teams: 5
- Venue(s): Estadio Nacional, San José

Final positions
- Champions: Costa Rica (1st title)
- Runners-up: El Salvador
- Third place: Curaçao

Tournament statistics
- Matches played: 10
- Goals scored: 70 (7 per match)
- Top scorer(s): (Costa Rica) Fello Meza (Colony of Curaçao and Dependencies) Hans Nahar (8 goals)

The 1941 CCCF Championship was the inaugural international association football championship for members of the Confederación Centroamericana y del Caribe de Fútbol (CCCF). Hosted by Costa Rica, the competition ran from 8–18 May 1941 and was contested by the national teams of Costa Rica, Curaçao, El Salvador, Nicaragua and Panama.

In the final match of the round-robin tournament, hosts Costa Rica were crowned champions as they completed a clean sweep by defeating El Salvador 3–1.

== Background ==
The Confederación Centroamericana y del Caribe de Fútbol (CCCF) was founded in 1938. Along with the North American Football Confederation (NAFC), it was a precursor organisation to the Confederation of North, Central America and Caribbean Association Football (CONCACAF). Within three years of its founding, the CCCF organised a contest for its member associations.

== Format ==
The tournament was played as a single round-robin where each team would play all of the others once. The winner would be decided by the total number of points obtained across all matches played.

=== Participants ===
- Costa Rica
- Curaçao
- El Salvador
- Nicaragua
- Panama

== Referees ==
Two referees were used during the tournament:

- (Spain) Jacobo de Foinquinos
- (Cuba) José Tapia

== Venue ==
All matches were held at the Estadio Nacional in San José.

San José
Estadio Nacional
Capacity: 25,000
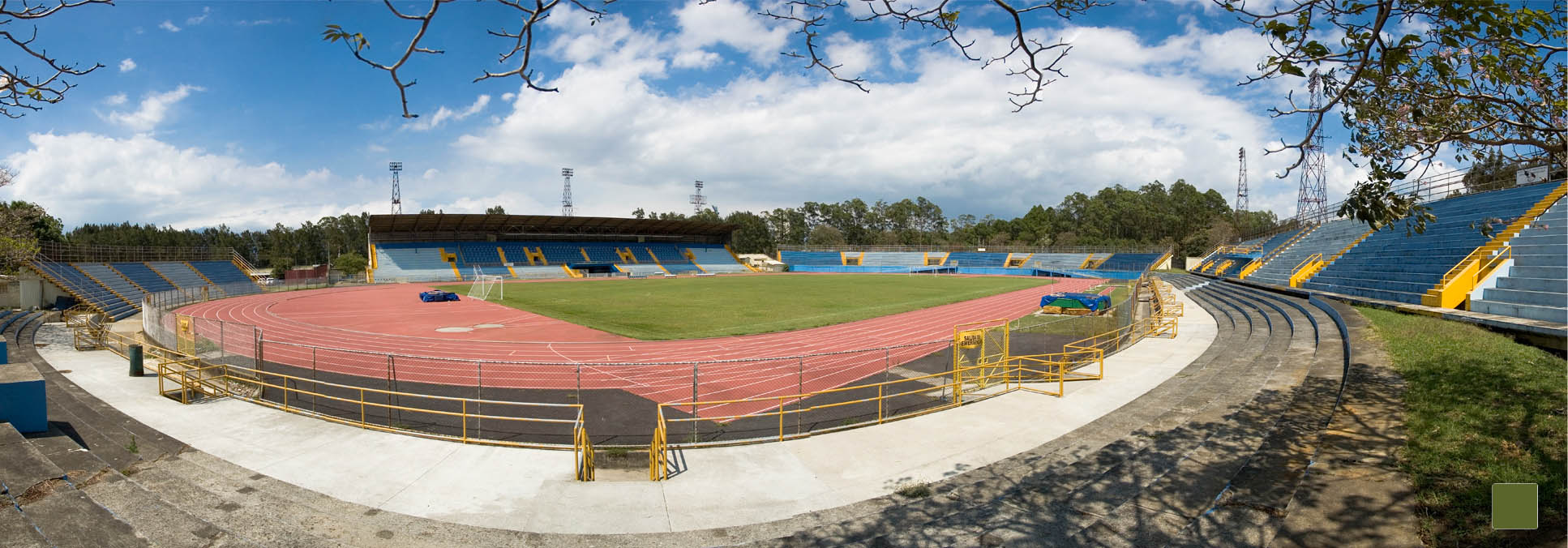

== Summary ==
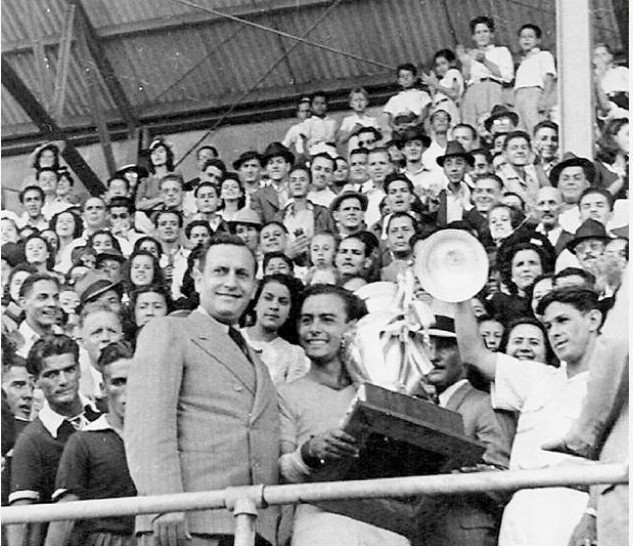
The President of the Republic of Costa Rica, Rafael Ángel Calderón Guardia, presents the champion's trophy to the goalkeeper and captain of the national team, Hugo Zúñiga, (at his side) and to the coach Alejandro Morera Soto (in white).

The tournament began on 8 May 1941 when a Hans Nahar hat-trick looked to have sealed a win for Curaçao over Panama. However, a last-minute Antoine Neville penalty saw the match end 3–3. Two days later, a hat-trick from Jesús María Araya helped hosts Costa Rica to a 7–2 win against Nicaragua. The following day, El Salvador were held to a 2–2 by Curaçao who had been two goals down entering the last 20 minutes of the match. Costa Rica recorded their second win of the tournament, defeating Panama 7–0. Having played half their matches, Costa Rica sat top of the table with four points, two more than Curaçao and three ahead of El Salvador and Panama.

On 13 May, Costa Rica extended their lead at the top of the table after a Fello Meza hat-trick helped them to a 6–2 win over Curaçao. Antonio Toledo also scored a hat-trick as El Salvador recorded the biggest win of the tournament, defeating Nicaragua 8–0. Two days later, El Salvador maintained their challenge for the trophy as they narrowly defeated Panama 4–3. In their final game, Nahar scored four times as Curaçao equalled the biggest win of the competition, defeating Nicaragua 9–1, to assure themselves of third place. With one round of matches left to play, Costa Rica held a one-point lead over El Salvador with the two due to play in the final match.

Luis Carlos Rangel scored a hat-trick for Panama as they rounded off the competition with a 5–2 win against Nicaragua. In the final match, Jesús María Araya scored a brace as Costa Rica completed a clean sweep, winning all four of their matches, by defeating El Salvador 3–1.

== Table ==
| Pos | Team | Pld | W | D | L | GF | GA | GD | Pts |
|---|---|---|---|---|---|---|---|---|---|
| 1 | Costa Rica (C) | 4 | 4 | 0 | 0 | 23 | 5 | +18 | 8 |
| 2 | El Salvador | 4 | 2 | 1 | 1 | 15 | 8 | +7 | 5 |
| 3 | Curaçao | 4 | 1 | 2 | 1 | 16 | 12 | +4 | 4 |
| 4 | Panama | 4 | 1 | 1 | 2 | 11 | 16 | −5 | 3 |
| 5 | Nicaragua | 4 | 0 | 0 | 4 | 5 | 29 | −24 | 0 |

(C) Champions

== Results ==
8 May 1941

| Curaçao | 3–3 | Panama |
|---|---|---|
| Nahar 15', 50', ?' | | Rangel 3', 43'; Neville 90' (pen.) |

Estadio Nacional, San José
Referee: Jacobo Foinquinos (Honduras)
10 May 1941

| Nicaragua | 2–7 | Costa Rica |
|---|---|---|
| D. Morales 38'; P. Robleto 46' | | Rocha 7' (o.g.); Mantainés 12' (o.g.); Araya 18', 22', 29'; Rodríguez 37'; Arnáez |

Estadio Nacional, San José
Referee: José Tapia (Cuba)

11 May 1941

| El Salvador | 2–2 | Curaçao |
|---|---|---|
| Gutiérrez 2'; Contreras 43' | | Nahar 70'; Panneflek 72' |

Estadio Nacional, San José
Referee: José Tapia (Cuba)
11 May 1941

| Panama | 0–7 | Costa Rica |
|---|---|---|
| | | A. Varela 20'; Meza 38', ?', ?', ?'; Rodriguez ?'; Bonilla ?' |

Estadio Nacional, San José
Referee: Jacobo Foinquinos (Honduras)

13 May 1941

| Costa Rica | 6–2 | Curaçao |
|---|---|---|
| A. Varela 5'; Meza 30', 60', ?'; Araya 64', 89' | | Pardo 10'; Bernabela ?' |

Estadio Nacional, San José
Referee: José Tapia (Cuba)
13 May 1941

| Nicaragua | 0–8 | El Salvador |
|---|---|---|
| | | Toledo 6', 8', 24'; Donado 15'; Rosales 43', ?'; R. Méndez 53', ?' |

Estadio Nacional, San José
Referee: Jacobo Foinquinos (Honduras)

15 May 1941

| El Salvador | 4–3 | Panama |
|---|---|---|
| Gutiérrez 19', 30'; Rosales 60', 85' | | Anderson 10'; Rangel 40'; Castro 89' |

Estadio Nacional, San José
Referee: José Tapia (Cuba)
15 May 1941

| Curaçao | 9–1 | Nicaragua |
|---|---|---|
| Pardo 5', 8'; Nahar ?', ?', 65', ?'; F. Jansen ?', ?', 88' | | D. Morales 18' |

Estadio Nacional, San José
Referee: Jacobo Foiquinos (Honduras)

18 May 1941

| Panama | 5–2 | Nicaragua |
|---|---|---|
| A. Morales ?'; Rangel 35', ?', ?'; Anderson | | D. Morales 7'; García ?' |

Estadio Nacional, San José
Referee: Jacobo Foiquinos (Honduras)
18 May 1941

| Costa Rica | 3–1 | El Salvador |
|---|---|---|
| Araya 31', 80'; Meza 33' | | Mendez 37' |

Estadio Nacional, San José
Referee: José Tapia (Cuba)

== Goalscorers ==
There were 70 goals scored in 10 matches, for an average of 7 goals per match.

8 goals

- (Costa Rica) Fello Meza
- (Colony of Curaçao and Dependencies) Hans Nahar

7 goals

- (Costa Rica) Jesús María Araya

6 goals

- (Panama) Luis Carlos Rangel

5 goals

- (El Salvador) Jorge Mendez

3 goals

- (Colony of Curaçao and Dependencies) Federico Jansen
- (Colony of Curaçao and Dependencies) Guillermo Pardo
- (El Salvador) René Gutiérrez
- (El Salvador) Antonio Toledo
- (Nicaragua) Dolores Morales

2 goals

- (Costa Rica) Walker Rodriguez
- (Costa Rica) Aníbal Varela
- (El Salvador) Aquilino Rosales
- (Panama) James Santiago Anderson

1 goal

- (Costa Rica) Alfonso Arnaez
- (Costa Rica) Santiago Bonilla
- (Colony of Curaçao and Dependencies) Reinaldo Bernabela
- (Colony of Curaçao and Dependencies) Humberto Panneflek
- (El Salvador) Alejandro Contreras
- (El Salvador) Gustavo Donado
- (Nicaragua) Ramón García
- (Nicaragua) Pedro Robleto
- (Panama) Virgilio Castro
- (Panama) Antonio Morales
- (Panama) Antoine Neville

1 own goal

- (Nicaragua) Abraham Rocha (against Costa Rica)
- (Nicaragua) Humberto Martinez (against Costa Rica)
