= Igemar Pieternella =

Curaçao footballer and manager

Personal information
- Date of birth: 7 December 1967 (age 58)
- Place of birth: Netherlands Antilles
- Position: Midfielder

Senior career*
Years	Team	Apps	(Gls)
- ?
- RKSV Centro Dominguito

Managerial career
- 2012–2013: Curaçao (assistant)
- 2014: Curaçao
- * Club domestic league appearances and goals

Igemar Pieternella (born 7 December 1967) is a Curaçao professional football player and manager.

== Career ==
He played for the RKSV Centro Dominguito.

Since 2012 until 2013 he worked with the Curaçao national football team as assistant. In 2014, he was an interim coach of the Curaçao national football team.
