= Curaçao Football Federation =

Governing body of association football in Curaçao

CONCACAF
- Founded: 1921; 105 years ago
- Headquarters: Willemstad, Curaçao
- FIFA affiliation: 1932
- CONCACAF affiliation: 1961
- President: vacant
- Vice-President: Fabi Constansia
- Website: ffk.cw

Curaçao Football Federation (Dutch: Curaçaose voetbalbond; Papiamento: Federashon Futbòl Kòrsou; abbreviated as FFK) is the governing body of association football in Curaçao. It is the legal successor of the Netherlands Antillean Football Union, which ended with the dissolution of the Netherlands Antilles in 2010. International matches are represented by the Curaçao national football team. The NAVU was renamed to FFK on 9 February 2011 after FIFA had encouraged changing the name and update statutes, like dealing with Bonaire, who belonged then to the Netherlands.

== History ==
Football in Curaçao was originally governed by the Curaçao Football Association as the football association of the Dutch territory of Curaçao, founded in 1921. In 1958, football administration in the Caribbean Netherlands, including the Curaçao Football Association, was merged into the Netherlands Antillean Football Union (NAVU) following the creation of the Netherlands Antilles which comprised all of the Dutch territories in the Caribbean. In 2010, following the dissolution of the Netherlands Antilles, Curaçao regained its footballing independence. FIFA recognised the newly renamed Curaçao Football Federation as the successor of the NAVU.

In 2025, the Curaçao national football team qualified for the FIFA World Cup in 2026 for the first time in their history. In 2026, the Curaçao Football Federation signed a formal co-operation agreement with the Royal Dutch Football Association with the aim of assisting the promotion of football in Curaçao.

== Association staff ==
Name	Position	Source
(Curaçao) Vacant	President	
(Curaçao) Fabi Constansia	Vice President	
(Curaçao) Jairo Belioso	Acting General Secretary	
(Curaçao) Stanley Coffy	2nd General Secretary	
(Curaçao) Fabi Constansia	Treasurer	
(Suriname) Dean Gorré	Technical Director	
(Netherlands) Dick Advocaat	Team Coach (Men's)	
(Netherlands) Johan van Heertum	Team Coach (Women's)	
(Curaçao) Liviena Rijschot	Media/Communications Manager	
n/a	Futsal Coordinator	
(Curaçao) Nadine Curlima Carolina	Referee Coordinator	
