= Curaçao Football Association =

Football association of Dutch constituent country

CCCF
- Founded: 1921
- Folded: 1958
- FIFA affiliation: 1932–41; 1946–58

Curaçao Football Association (Dutch: Curaçaose Voetbalbond, or CVB) was a Curaçaoan football association. It was a member association of FIFA between 1932 and 1941, and 1946 to 1958.

== Overview ==
The CVB was responsible for the Curaçao national football team (1921–1958).

Between 1941 and 1946, FIFA had decided to select Nederlands Antilliaanse Voetbal Bond (NAVB) as their member association. Unlike the CVB, The NAVB consisted of representatives from Aruba as well as Curaçao.

The organisation was replaced with Netherlands Antillean Football Union (NAVU) in September 1958.
