= Curaçao national football team (1921–1958) =

Men's association football team (1921–1958)

Curaçao (Territory of Curaçao)
1924–1958
- Association: Curaçaose Voetbal Bond
- Confederation: CCCF (1938–1958)
- Most caps: Ergilio Hato (35)
- Top scorer: Maximiliano Juliana (8)

First international
- (Netherlands) Aruba 0–4 Curaçao (Aruba, 6 April 1924)

Last international
- Denmark 3–2 Curaçao (Denmark, 16 May 1958)

Biggest win
- Curaçao 14–0 Puerto Rico (Barranquilla, Colombia, 21 December 1948)

Biggest defeat
- Netherlands 8–1 Curaçao (Netherlands, 23 April 1948)

The Territory of Curaçao national football team (more commonly known as Curaçao) was the official football team for the Territory of Curaçao, under the control of the Curaçaose Voetbal Bond (CVB).

The Territory of Curaçao officially became the Netherlands Antilles on 15 December 1954 although the national football team played under the name of Curaçao until 1958. However, the team competed at the 1952 Olympics and 1955 Pan American Games as the Netherlands Antilles due to their affiliation with the Netherlands Antilles Olympic Committee.

== History ==
=== Getting organized ===
In 1921 the football federation CVB (Curacaose Voetbal Bond) was established and in August that year the CVB organized the first Curaçao Championship with eight participating clubs. In 1926 the first national selection of Curaçao travelled to Haiti to play in a tournament against Haiti, Jamaica and Santo Domingo. The Curaçao selection did quite well in the tournament, with several wins over Haiti and Santo Domingo.

In 1932 the federation CVB became affiliated with FIFA. Exchanges with neighboring islands and countries followed on a regular basis. In 1941 the First CCCF Championship took place in San José. Participating countries were Costa Rica, Curaçao, Nicaragua, El Salvador and Panama. Curaçao ended third.

At the end of this year the Curaçao and Aruba federations, both islands being part of the Netherlands Antilles, decided to join forces and established NAVU, Netherlands Antillean Football Union. Both federations remained autonomous in their own territory, and the winners of the championships on the respective islands would play against each other to determine which club would be Champion of the Netherlands Antilles.

=== Early years ===
Curaçao is a small Caribbean island located just north of the Venezuelan coast. Curaçao is part of the Kingdom of the Netherlands, as are the islands Aruba, Bonaire, Sint Maarten, Sint Eustatius and Saba, together known as the former Netherlands Antilles. Curaçao has about 150,000 inhabitants.

In 1909 the first football club was established in Curaçao, then counting about 25.000 inhabitants, CVV Republic. Young people who had spent time in the Netherlands for study and had started playing football and taken a liking to the game united in CVV Republic. At the time there were no soccer fields on Curaçao and the first match between CVV Republic and a team of marines took place in the garden of the church of Sta. Famia. As a matter of fact, the Friars, who also ran the schools, played an important role in the early stages of soccer development as they propagated the sport and also organized volunteers to clean and prepare the first fields in Skalo and Mundo.

=== Golden years ===
In May 1946, the CVB celebrated its 25th anniversary by hosting an international tournament in Curaçao, featuring visiting teams from Aruba, Suriname, Atlético Junior from Colombia, and Feyenoord from the Netherlands. Curaçao won all of its matches, concluding with a 4–0 victory over Feyenoord. In July 1946, the Curaçao selection toured the Netherlands to strengthen sports ties. During the three-month tour, the selection played nine matches against Dutch clubs, including a 3–3 draw against Feyenoord at the stadium in Rotterdam that drew over 37,000 spectators—a crowd size roughly equivalent to the total population of Curaçao at the time. The young goalkeeper Ergilio Hato gained widespread recognition during the tour for his athleticism.

The Curaçao national selection continued to achieve regional success in the CCCF Championship and the Central American and Caribbean Games, winning the gold medal in 1950. Hato, nicknamed El Pantera Negra ("The Black Panther"), declined several professional contract offers abroad to remain on his native island; the national stadium was later named Ergilio Hato Stadium in his honor.

In 1958, organizational restructuring led to the establishment of the Netherlands Antilles Football Union (NAVU). The Aruban AVB affiliated with NAVU in 1958, followed by the Bonaire Football Federation (BVB) in 1959, allowing players from all three islands to represent the Netherlands Antilles national team. Mordy Maduro, president of the CVB from 1951 and president of NAVU from 1958 to 1971, was a primary driver behind both NAVU and the FFK. Maduro served as vice-president of FIFA from 1960 to 1971 and facilitated international club visits to Curaçao. In 2002, the NAVU development center was named in his honor.

At the club level, Curaçao's CRKSV Jong Colombia reached the finals of the 1979 CONCACAF Champions' Cup, finishing as runners-up to El Salvador's C.D. FAS following a 7–1 final result after nine matches.

== Competitive record ==
=== FIFA World Cup ===
FIFA World Cup record								Qualification record					
Year	Result	Pld	W	D	L	GF	GA	Pld	W	D	L	GF	GA
(Uruguay) 1930	Did not enter							Did not enter					
(Italy) 1934	Did not enter							Did not enter					
(France) 1938	Did not enter							Did not enter					
(Brazil) 1950	Did not enter							Did not enter					
(Switzerland) 1954	Did not enter							Did not enter					
(Sweden) 1958	Did not qualify							3	1	0	2	4	7
Total	—	–	–	–	–	–	–	3	1	0	2	4	7

=== CCCF Championship ===
CCCF Championship record
Year	Result	GP	W	D	L	GF	GA
(Costa Rica) 1941	Third place	4	1	2	1	16	12
(El Salvador) 1943	Did not enter						
(Costa Rica) 1946	Did not enter						
(Guatemala) 1948	Fourth place	8	2	2	4	14	16
(Panama) 1951	Did not enter						
(Costa Rica) 1953	Fourth place	6	2	2	2	17	9
(Honduras) 1955	Runners-up	6	4	0	2	11	7
(Netherlands Antilles) 1957	Runners-up	4	2	1	1	7	4
Total	Runners-up	28	11	7	10	65	48

=== Olympic Games ===
Olympic Games record
Year	Result	Pld	W	D	L	GF	GA
(United Kingdom) 1908	Did not exist						
(Sweden) 1912	Did not exist						
(Belgium) 1920	Did not exist						
(France) 1924	Did not enter						
(Netherlands) 1928	Did not enter						
(Nazi Germany) 1936	Did not enter						
(United Kingdom) 1948	Did not enter						
(Finland) 1952*	First round	1	0	0	1	1	2
(Australia) 1956	Did not enter						
Total	First round	1	0	0	1	1	2

=== Pan American Games ===
Pan American Games record
Year	Result	Pld	W	D	L	GF	GA
(Argentina) 1951	Did not enter						
(Mexico) 1955*	Bronze Medal	6	2	0	4	11	13
Total	Bronze Medal	6	2	0	4	11	13

=== Central American and Caribbean Games ===
Central American and Caribbean Games record
Year	Result	Pld	W	D	L	GF	GA
(Cuba) 1930	Did not enter						
(El Salvador) 1935	Did not enter						
(Panama) 1938	Did not enter						
(Colombia) 1946	Bronze Medal	6	3	2	1	25	10
(Guatemala) 1950	Gold Medal	6	4	1	1	20	6
(Mexico) 1954	Did not enter						
Total	Gold Medal	12	7	3	2	45	16

- Team entered under the Netherlands Antilles name as they were representing the Netherlands Antilles Olympic Committee

== Honours ==
=== Regional ===
- CCCF Championship
  - Runners-up (2): 1955, 1957
  - Third place (1): 1941
- Central American and Caribbean Games
  - Bronze medal (1): 1946

=== Friendly ===
- Four-Nations Tournament
  - Champions (1): 1944
