= Netherlands Antillean Football Union =

Governing body of football in the Netherlands Antilles

CONCACAF
- Founded: 5 September 1958
- Folded: 5 February 2011
- FIFA affiliation: 1958
- CONCACAF affiliation: 18 September 1961

The Netherlands Antillean Football Union (Dutch: Nederlands Antilliaanse Voetbal Unie, or NAVU) was the governing body of football in the former Netherlands Antilles between September 1958 and February 2011. Its jurisdiction consisted of the islands of Curaçao, Bonaire and (until 1986) Aruba.

NAVU was established on 5 September 1958 following a merger between Aruba Football Federation (AVB) and Curaçao Football Association (CVB). The Bonaire Football Federation (BVB) later joined on 4 August 1963. The FIFA membership of CVB was transferred to NAFU in 1958.

NAVU was a founding member of CONCACAF in September 1961.

The Aruba Football Federation split from NAFU in 1986 and becoming a full member of CONCACAF and two years later, a full member of FIFA.

In February 2011, NAFU was succeeded by Federashon Futbol Korsou (FFK) following the dissolution of the Netherlands Antilles.
