= Ravachol (parrot) =

Parrot from Pontevedra, Spain

Ravachol Parrot
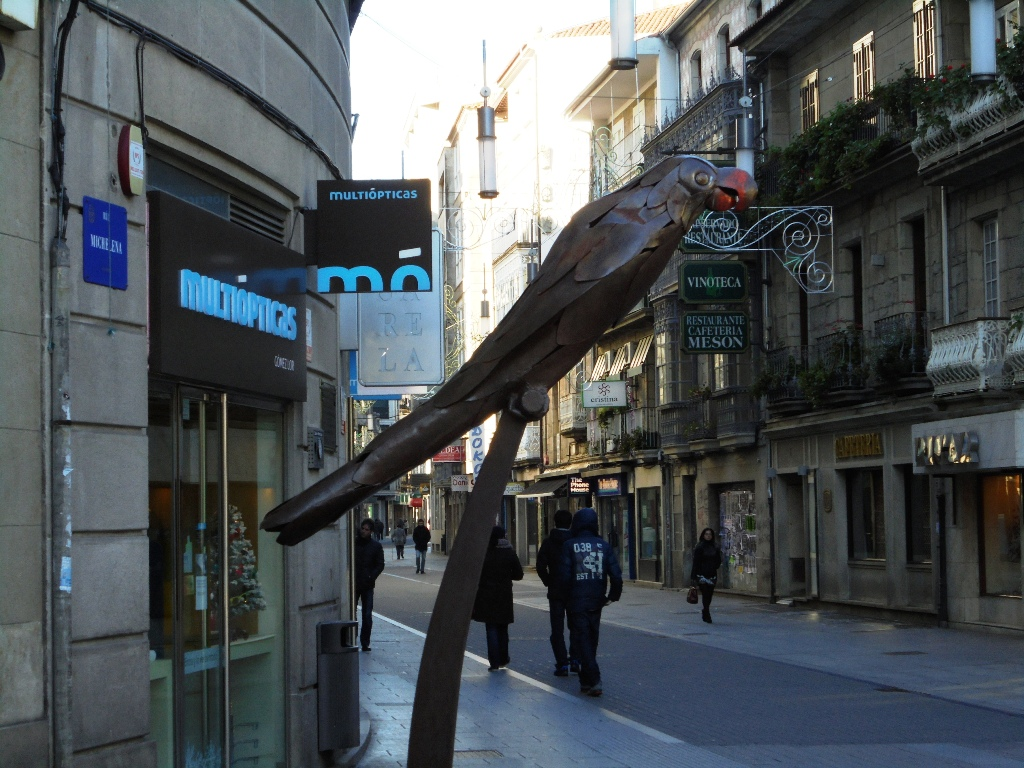
- Ravachol Parrot statue
- Species: Parrot
- Died: 26 January 1913; Pontevedra, Spain
- Resting place: Mourente, Pontevedra
- Occupation: Pharmacist's pet
- Years active: 22
- Known for: Intelligent and sarcastic conversation
- Owner: D. Perfecto Feijoo
- Residence: Pontevedra
- Named after: François Ravachol

Ravachol was a parrot who lived in Pontevedra, Spain, between 1891 and 1913. It was the pet of pharmacist Perfecto Feijoo and became one of the symbols of the city. The burial of Ravachol is commemorated every year during the carnival of the city of Pontevedra.

== Origin of the name ==
There is no evidence that the parrot had a specific name during its first months in Pontevedra, but before a year had passed since its arrival in the city, all the neighbours referred to it by the name of a famous French revolutionary. François Ravachol was an anarchist who, as well as being a troublemaker, was known for his terrorist attacks with dynamite.

It was his owner Don Perfecto Feijoo himself who named the parrot Ravachol, because of its unruly and untamable character.

== History ==
=== The owner ===
The pharmacist from Pontevedra Perfecto Feijoo (1858–1935) graduated from the University of Santiago de Compostela. Since 1880 he had run the pharmacy located in the Plaza de la Peregrina, next to the Church of the Pilgrim Virgin on the corner of Oliva Street. Personalities from politics, the arts and sciences came to his pharmacy to participate in meetings which were described as lively.

=== Origins ===
In 1702, the Spanish fleet, together with the French fleet, tried to land goods brought from America. The ships were attacked by the Anglo-Dutch fleet, which led to the Battle of Rande. Among the goods from the new continent was a cargo of exotic birds. After the ships sank, a large number of parrots managed to survive. They spread around and were captured by the villagers.

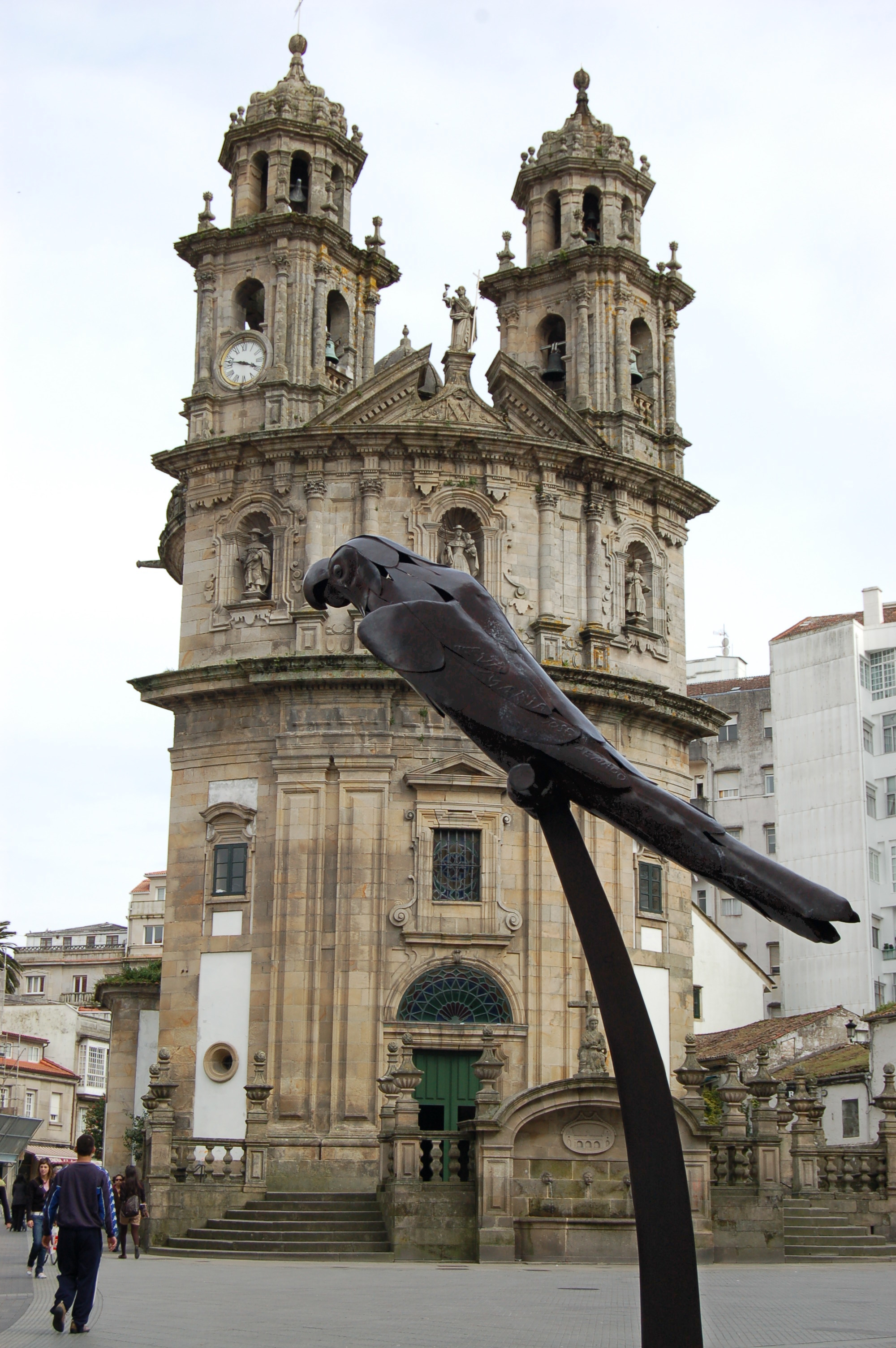
Ravachol in front of the church of the Pilgrim Virgin

The date of birth of the parrot is unknown, but it was in 1891 that Martin Fayes, a music teacher and director of the military band of Tui, a friend of D. Perfecto, gave it to him. The young parrot would stay in Pontevedra for 22 years.

=== Arrival in Pontevedra ===
It took some time for the parrot to adapt to his new home but he soon showed his restless and irreverent nature. His ability to speak was mixed with a vulgar vocabulary, said to have come from the soldiers in the barracks where his former owner Martin Fayes worked. Depending on the time of year and the time of day, the parrot's cage was located in the pharmacy, in the back of the pharmacy or outside the pharmacy next to a stone bench. It was in the latter location that the parrot was most comfortable enjoying the liveliness of passers-by.

=== Death and burial ===
On 26 January 1913, the Parrot died. It is said that the cause of his death was over-consumption of biscuits soaked in wine or poisoning. The society of Pontevedra was plunged into a sad sense of mourning and organised itself to bid farewell to the most emblematic reference of the city. The corpse was embalmed and displayed in the pharmacy.

The Society of Craftsmen organised the funeral and set up a burial chamber in the pharmacy. They set the date of the funeral for 5 February 1913. Famous people from Pontevedra took part in the funeral, which was a farewell to the beloved parrot Ravachol. The mortal remains of the parrot were buried in the estate that D. Perfecto owned in Mourente.

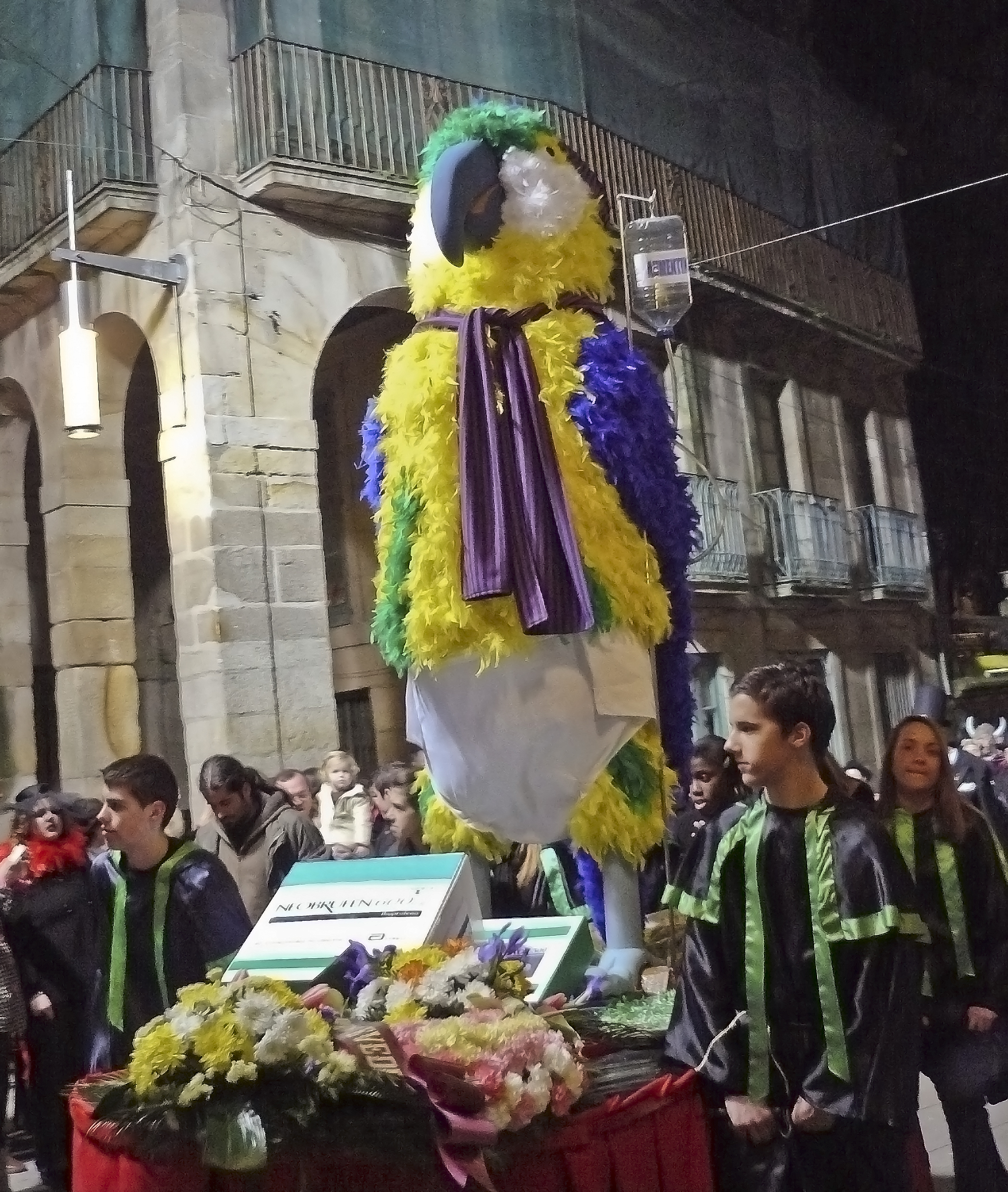
Procession to the funeral of Ravachol in 2008

== Description ==
=== Personality ===
The parrot's temperament was very peculiar, its verbosity and ease of expression made it a singular attraction. Many customers gave sweets to the parrot, as those who did not do so received a good reprimand from Ravachol.

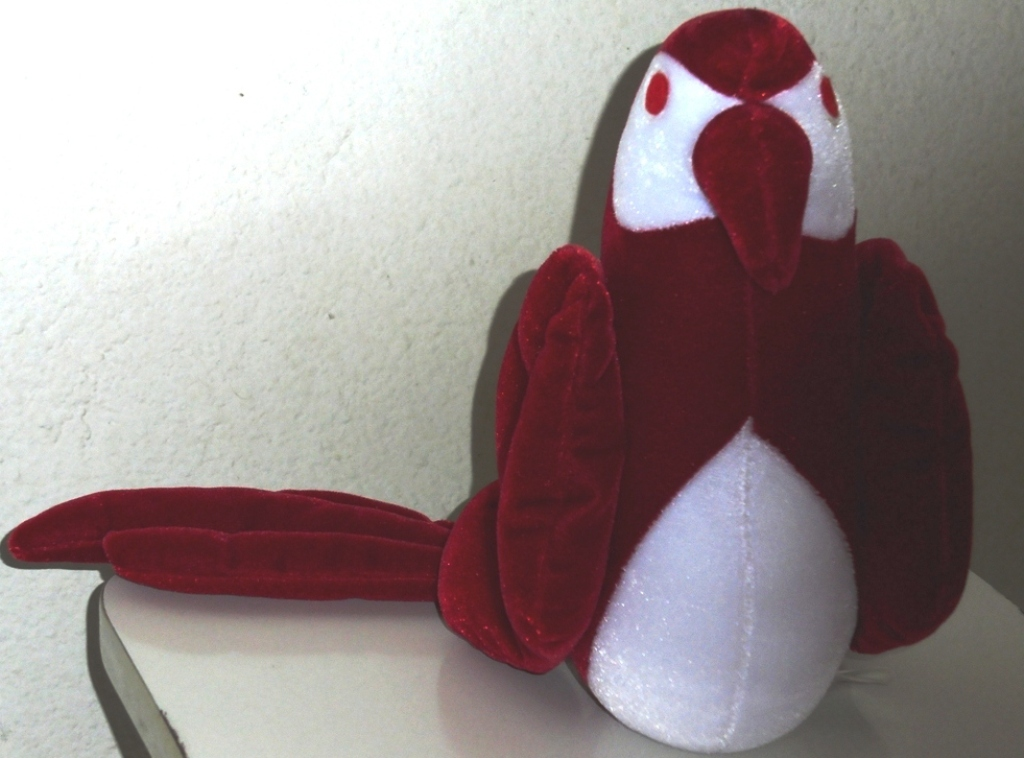
Official Ravachol souvenir

=== Curiosities and sentences ===
The life of the parrot was marked by a large number of anecdotes linked to its ease of expression and its particular sarcasm. The most surprising thing is that his mastery of the language was coupled with an intelligence that allowed him to hold small conversations. He also identified certain situations to apply his sentences, almost always in Galician, which soon became popular and were later used in the everyday language of the people of Pontevedra. For example, Ravachol could say the threatening words "se collo a vara..." (if I take the stick...) to address those who bothered him. If no one was looking after the customers and a customer came into the pharmacy, he would shout "Don Perfecto" (there are people in the shop). If the customer looked bad, he would shout: "We don't trust you here". On the other hand, when a priest arrived, he would imitate a crow. To the president of the Spanish government, Eugenio Montero Ríos, and to the writer Emilia Pardo Bazán he dedicated insults that would be condemned at the time. Another example of his intelligence is that sometimes he would shout "Don Perfecto a despachar" (Don Perfecto, go and take care of the customers) and when the pharmacist approached him he would say "engañeiche! "(I fooled you!).

== In popular culture ==
=== Modern burial ===
In 1985, a group of Pontevedrians, in collaboration with the municipal festivities committee, decided to recreate the wake and burial of Ravachol during the city's carnival. The success of this first recreation was such that within a few years Ravachol's burial became one of the most popular events of the Galician carnival. The celebration closes the carnival week in Pontevedra. It is customary for Ravachol to appear on Carnival Monday in a costume that changes every year depending on the current events. Initially, the funeral was held on Friday, but was moved to Saturday after Ash Wednesday to facilitate the participation of thousands of people in the funeral procession.

=== Relevance ===
There are many examples of recognition for this figure of the Pontevedra carnival. He has been the subject of television reports, journalistic columns, historical studies and literary inspiration. It also has its own saeta, rumba, tanguillos and coplas murgueras, badge and various merchandising items. The parrot has had a monument since 23 February 2006 at the very spot in the city where his picturesque exploits took place. It is precisely there that Don Perfecto Feijoo's chemist's shop, demolished in 1947 to widen Michelena Street, is rebuilt every year and the famous gatherings are recreated.

The parrot also has a dedicated figurine in the famous Galician pottery of Sargadelos. The cakes called Ravacholitos are also dedicated to Ravachol.

== Gallery ==
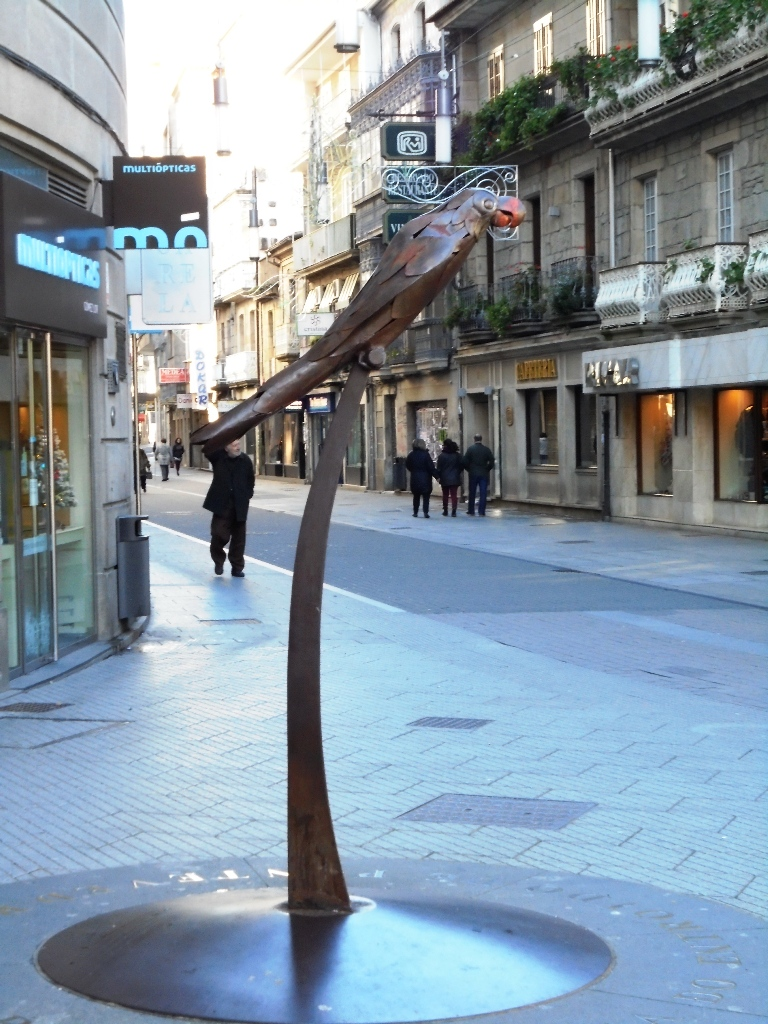
Sculpture of Ravachol in the city centre

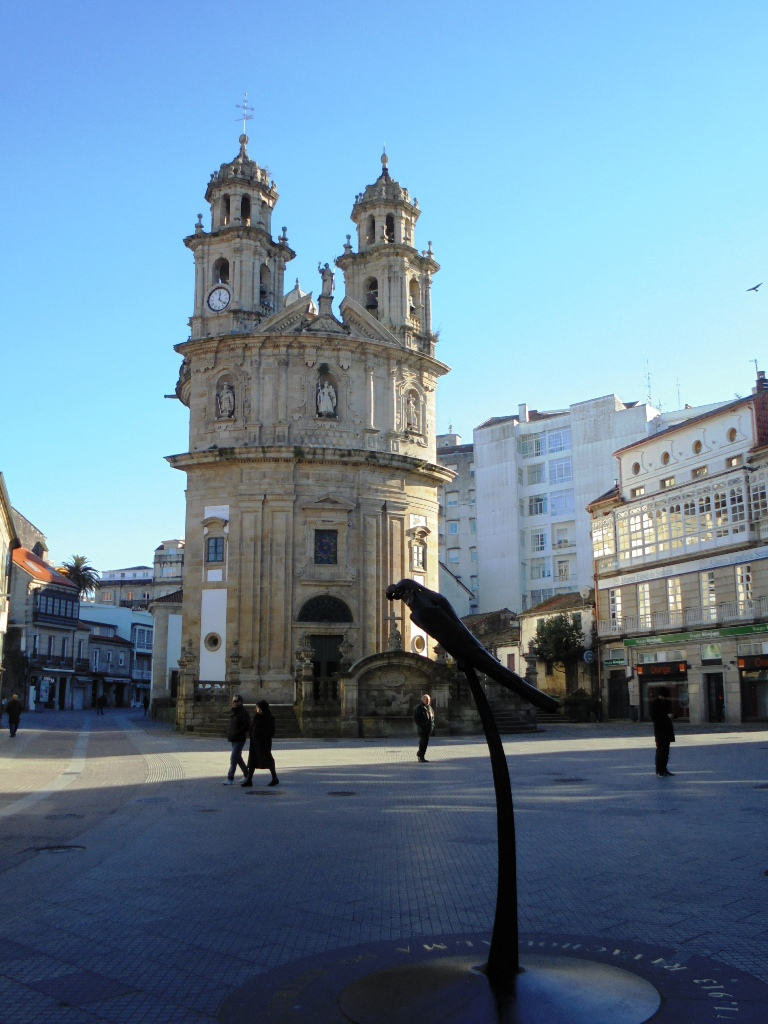
Pilgrim Virgin square

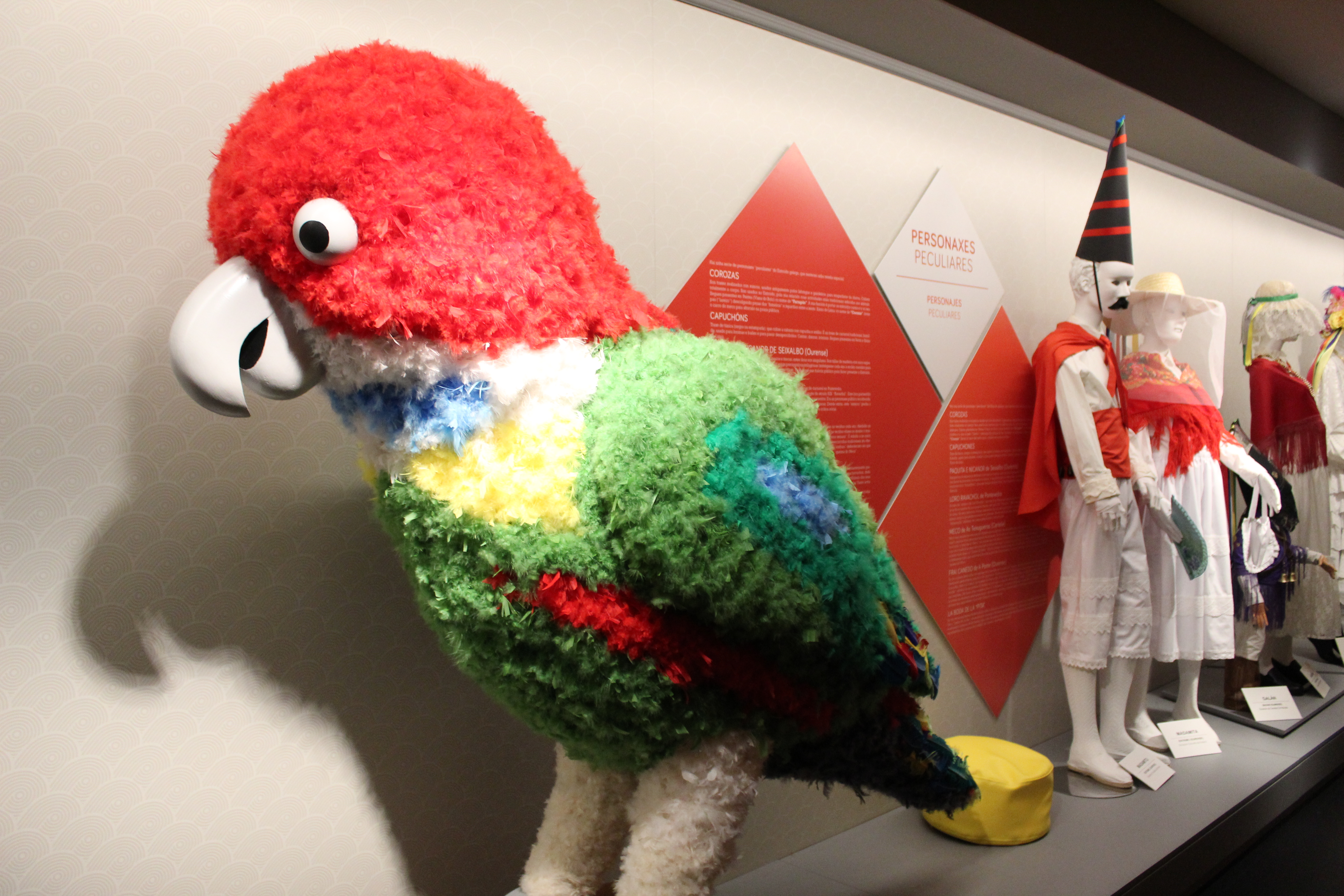
Ravachol at Carnival 2019

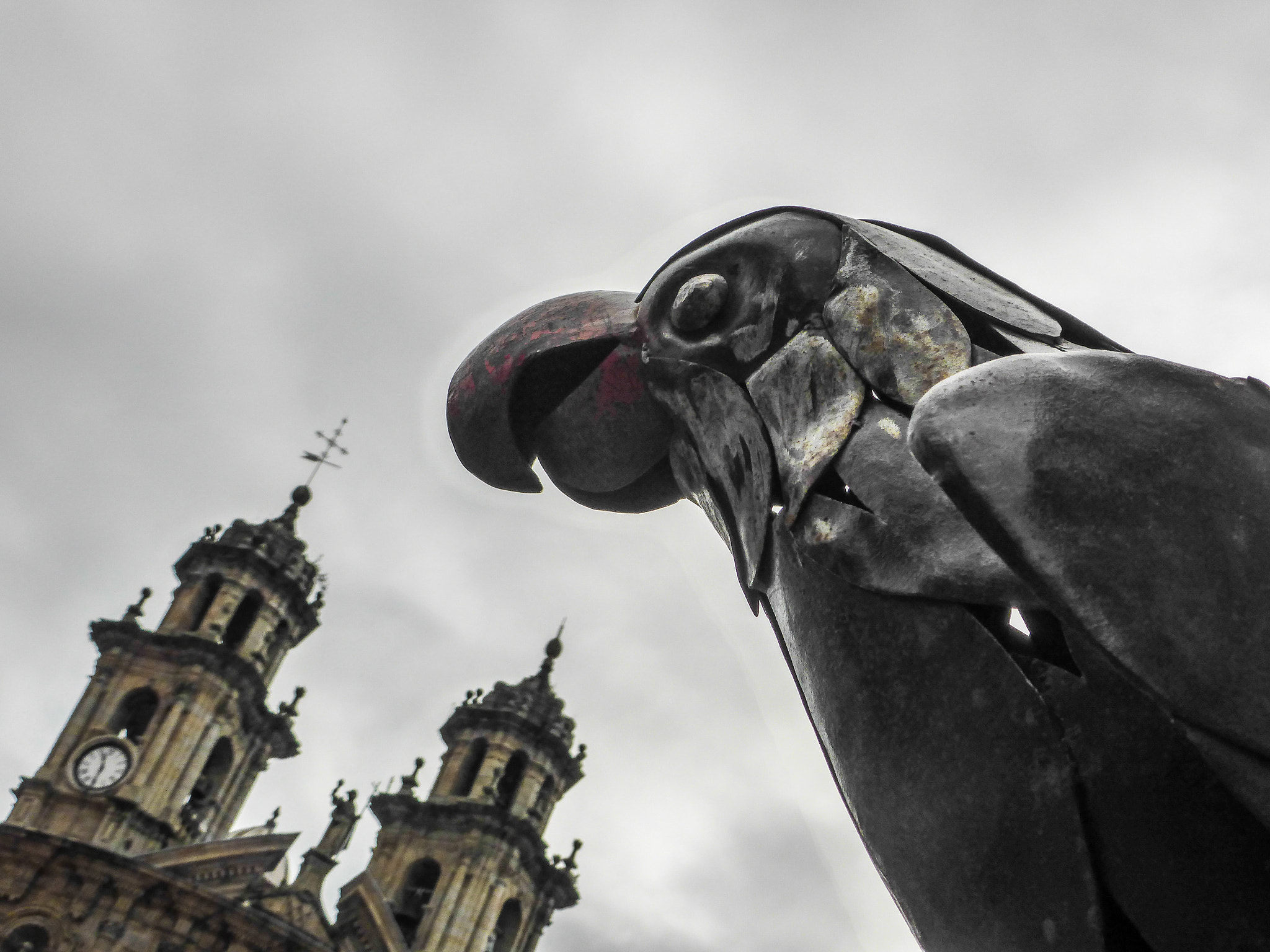
Parrot's head

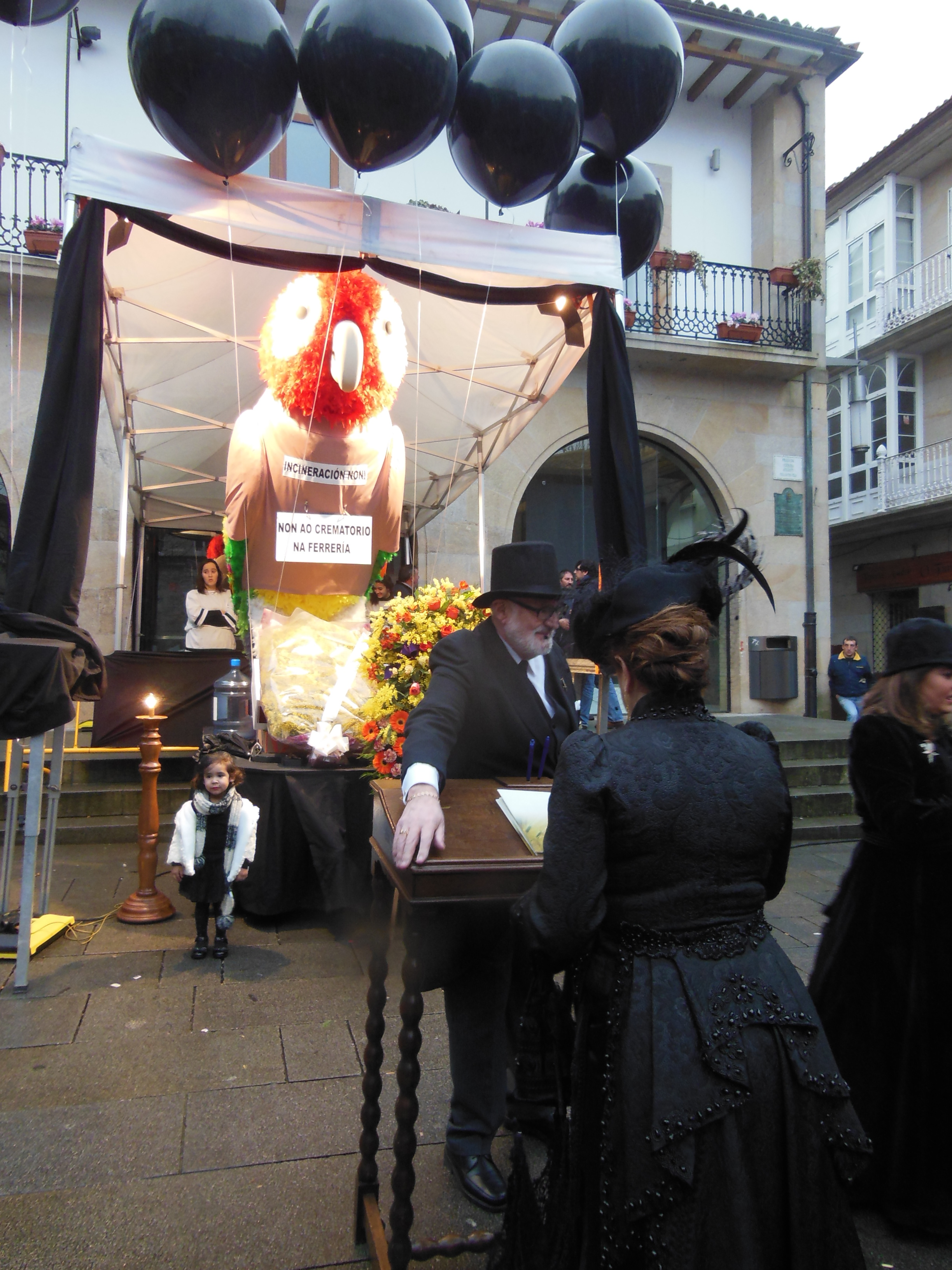
Ravachol in 2015 in the Verdura Square

== See also ==
=== Related articles ===
- Plaza de la Peregrina
- Michelena Street
- List of individual birds
