= Plaza de la Peregrina =

Medieval square in Pontevedra, Spain

Peregrina square
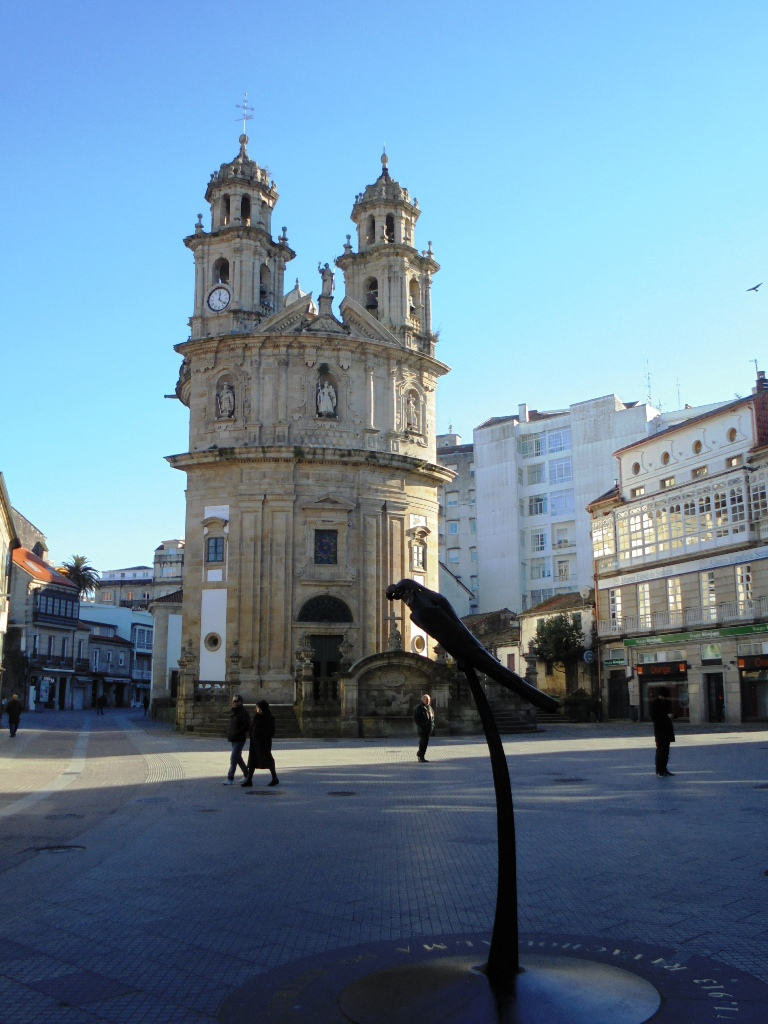
- Peregrina square
- Native name: Plaza de la Peregrina (Spanish)
- Type: plaza
- Maintained by: Pontevedra City Council
- Location: Pontevedra, Spain
- Postal code: 36001
- Coordinates: 42.43076°N 8.644047°W

The Plaza de la Peregrina is an 18th-century square located in the city centre of Pontevedra (Spain), on the edge of the historic centre.

== Origin of the name ==
The square is named after the baroque-neoclassical church of the Pilgrim Virgin, located on the eastern side of the square.

== History ==
On the small hill on which the Church of the Pilgrim Virgin now stands, from 1180 onwards, there was a column indicating the jurisdictional dominion of the archbishops of Santiago de Compostela. This column was used as a pillory and disappeared when the church was built. In this same space and adjacent to the walls of Pontevedra, a group of houses for public women was built in the 15th century. The Peregrina square is located in the middle of the via XIX of the Antonine Itinerary and appeared as such at the end of the 18th century with the construction of the church of the Pilgrim Virgin, as a kind of peripheral esplanade located outside the walled enclosure, next to the portuguese Way and the Trabancas gate and tower. Around 1793, the Pilgrim Virgin church parvise was built.

After the demolition of the Trabancas Gate of the Pontevedra walls in 1852, the former house of the Pilgrim Virgin Brotherhood was built in 1854. The Trabancas gate was located between this house and the one that adjoined it to the west, which belonged to the President of the Council of Ministers, Manuel Portela Valladares. Casto Sampedro, president of the Archaeological Society of Pontevedra and the first director of the Museum of Pontevedra, lived in the adjoining house to the east.

In 1880, the church parvise was transformed to open up the space, finished off with a wide front access staircase which replaced the original fountain. In 1913, the Ravachol Parrot, who had been living since 1891 in the pharmacy of Don Perfecto Feijoo, in a house that no longer exists at the southwestern end of the square, died.

In 1931, the square was renamed Plaza de la Libertad. In 1953, the architect and restorer Francisco Pons Sorolla recovered the original design of the fountain. At the beginning of 1955, the original configuration of the church parvise was restored, thanks to the project by Pons Sorolla, who replaced the main staircase with a stone balustrade, interrupted by a fountain ending in an arch. In 1956, a granite statue of Teucer breaking the jaws of the Nemean lion with a cross behind it was added to this arch of the fountain that closes the parvise.

In June 1983, heavy goods vehicles were banned from the square due to wear and tear on the foundations of the Pilgrim Virgin Church.

The square was made pedestrian and completely closed to traffic in August 2001.

On 23 February 2006, a sculpture dedicated to the Ravachol Parrot, by the sculptor José Luis Penado, was placed at the south-western end of the square.

== Description ==
The square has an irregular triangular shape and the streets Michelena, Oliva, Peregrina, Benito Corbal and Antonio Odriozola converge there, as well as the small street González Zúñiga behind the church of the Pilgrim Virgin. It is the heart of the city and the Portuguese Way runs through it.

The square is paved and pedestrianised, like the rest of the historic city centre. After the renovation in 2001 it became a completely open space.

The square is dominated on the east side by the parvise of the Church of the Pilgrim Virgin, which connects the church to the square by several flights of steps and is surrounded on the sides by small walls with balustrades and, at the front, by a stone fountain crowned by the statue of Teucer, the mythical founder of Pontevedra. For many years, the parvise was one of the main venues for the city's social events.

At the western end of the square, at the intersection of the beginning of Michelena Street, there is a statue of the Ravachol parrot, on the site of the pharmacy where the parrot lived until 1913, owned by the pharmacist Perfecto Feijoo.

== Outstanding buildings ==
On the eastern side of the square is the church of the Pilgrim Virgin. It is the symbol of the city for its uniqueness, being the only Spanish church of circular shape with a rounded façade on a scalloped plan, symbol of the pilgrims. The church of the Pilgrim Virgin, patron saint of the province of Pontevedra and of the Portuguese Way, was built in the 18th century in a Baroque and Neoclassical style. Its façade features images of the Virgin Mary, St. Joseph and St. James, all dressed as pilgrims. Inside, there is a 19th-century image of the Virgin.

On the north side of the square is the former House of the Brotherhood of the Pilgrim Virgin, which dates from 1854. It is a building with Art Nouveau decoration by the architect Antonio López Hernández, with a single body and three floors. Its most outstanding features are its galleries and balconies, which include two of the oldest cast iron galleries in the city. The exterior decoration of the facades is made of cement mortar, both on the roof, which has a parapet with fleurons, and on the window frames and balconies. On the façade, the upper corners of the windows and parapets are decorated with art nouveau "simple plant stems", an ornamentation that is repeated on the western corner of the building. Inside the house, on the ground floor, an entire section of the Pontevedra city walls is preserved, with an average height of over two metres.

== Gallery ==
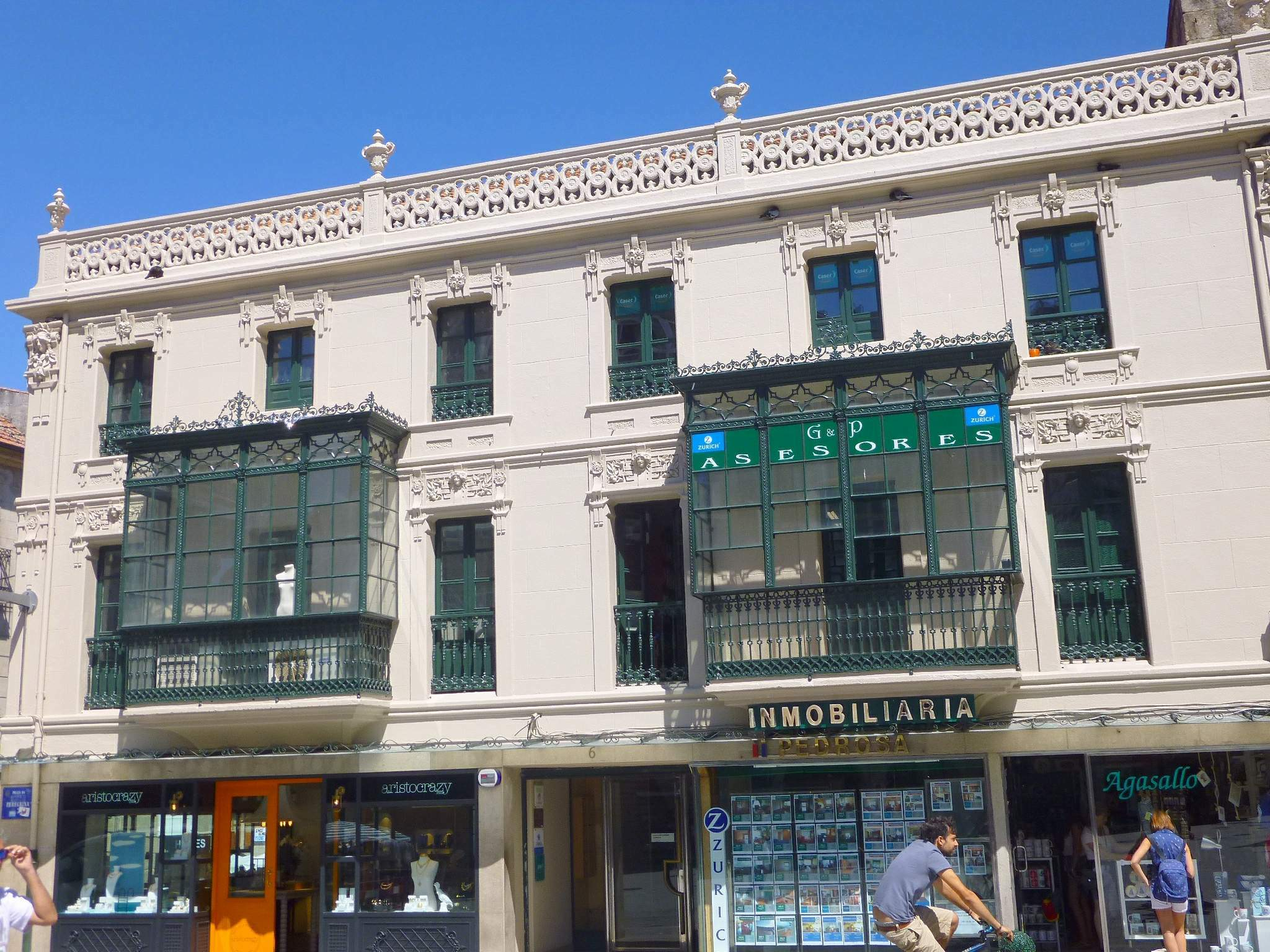
Former art nouveau house of the Brotherhood of the Pilgrim Virgin

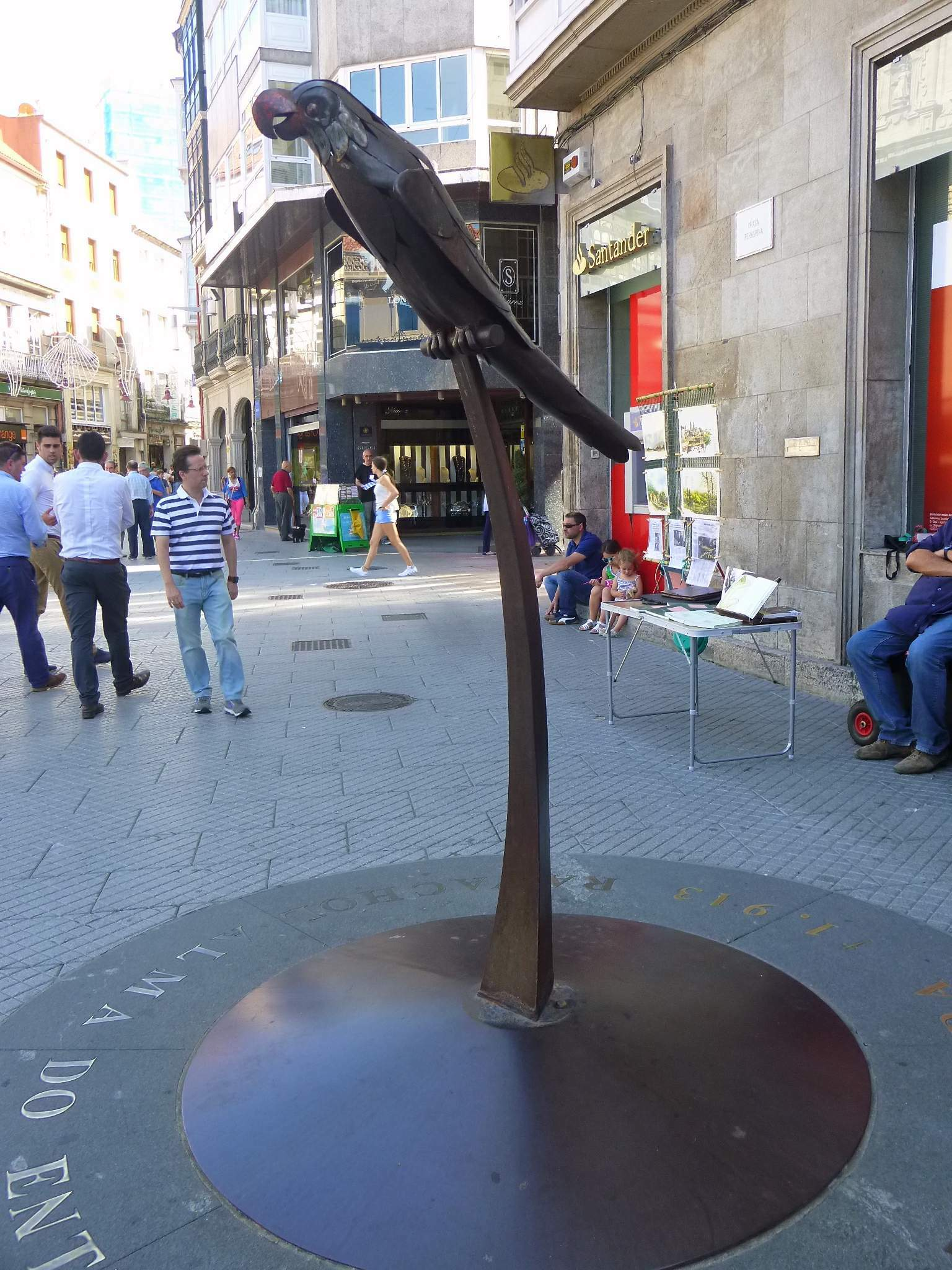
Sculpture of the Ravachol Parrot

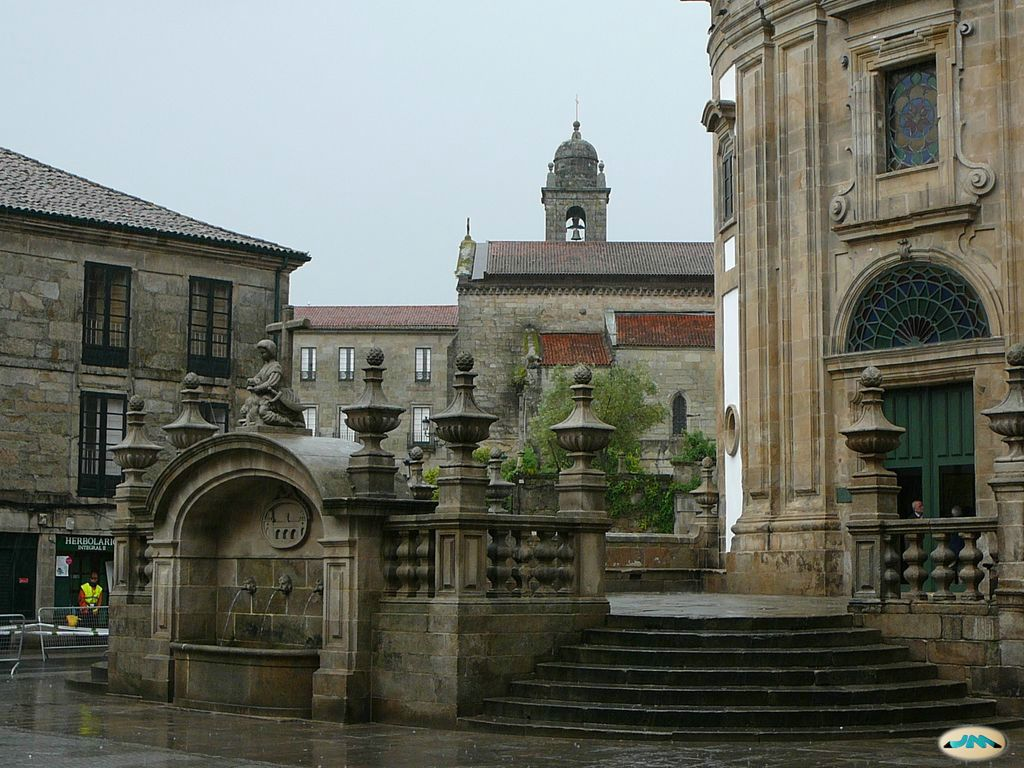
Parvise of the church of the Pilgrim Virgin overlooking the square

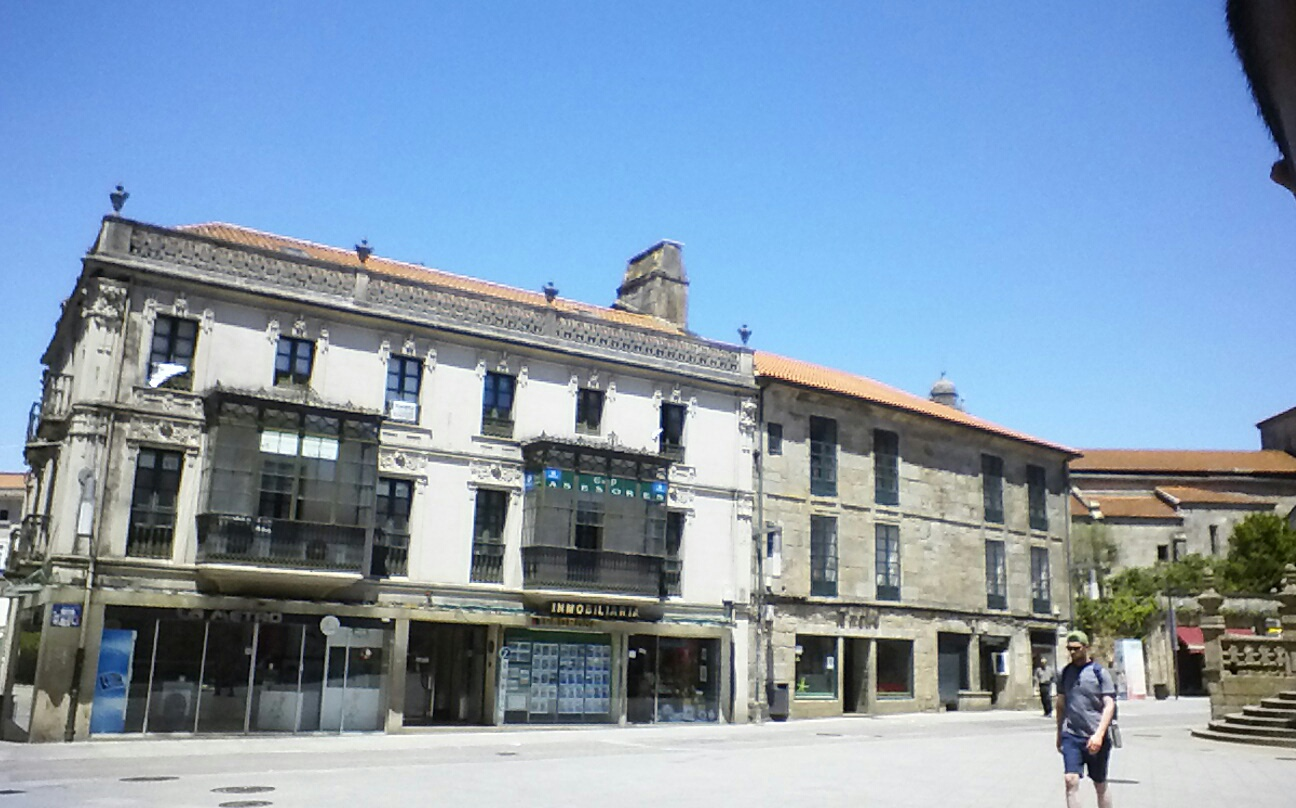
Houses in the square

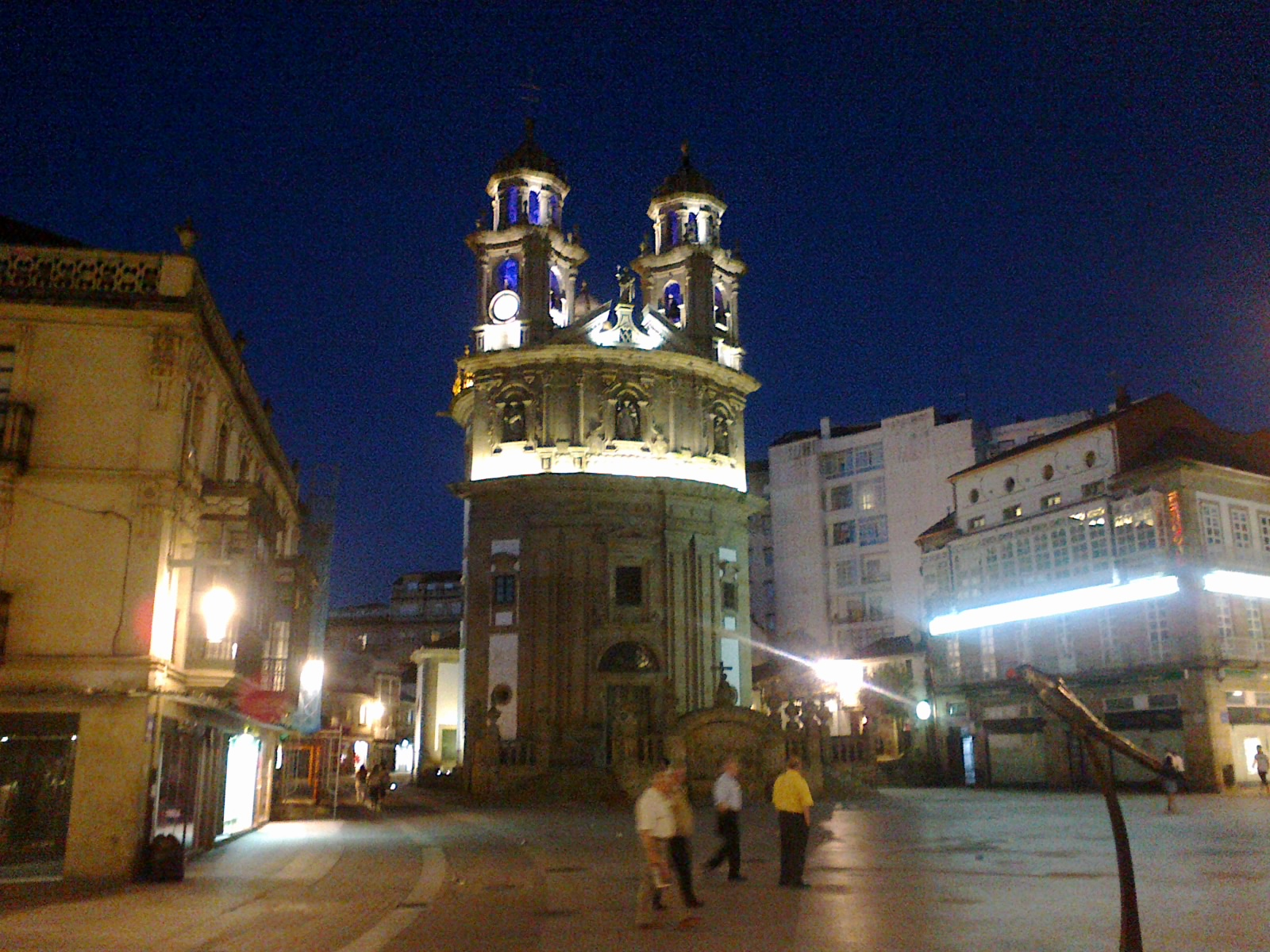
The square, at night

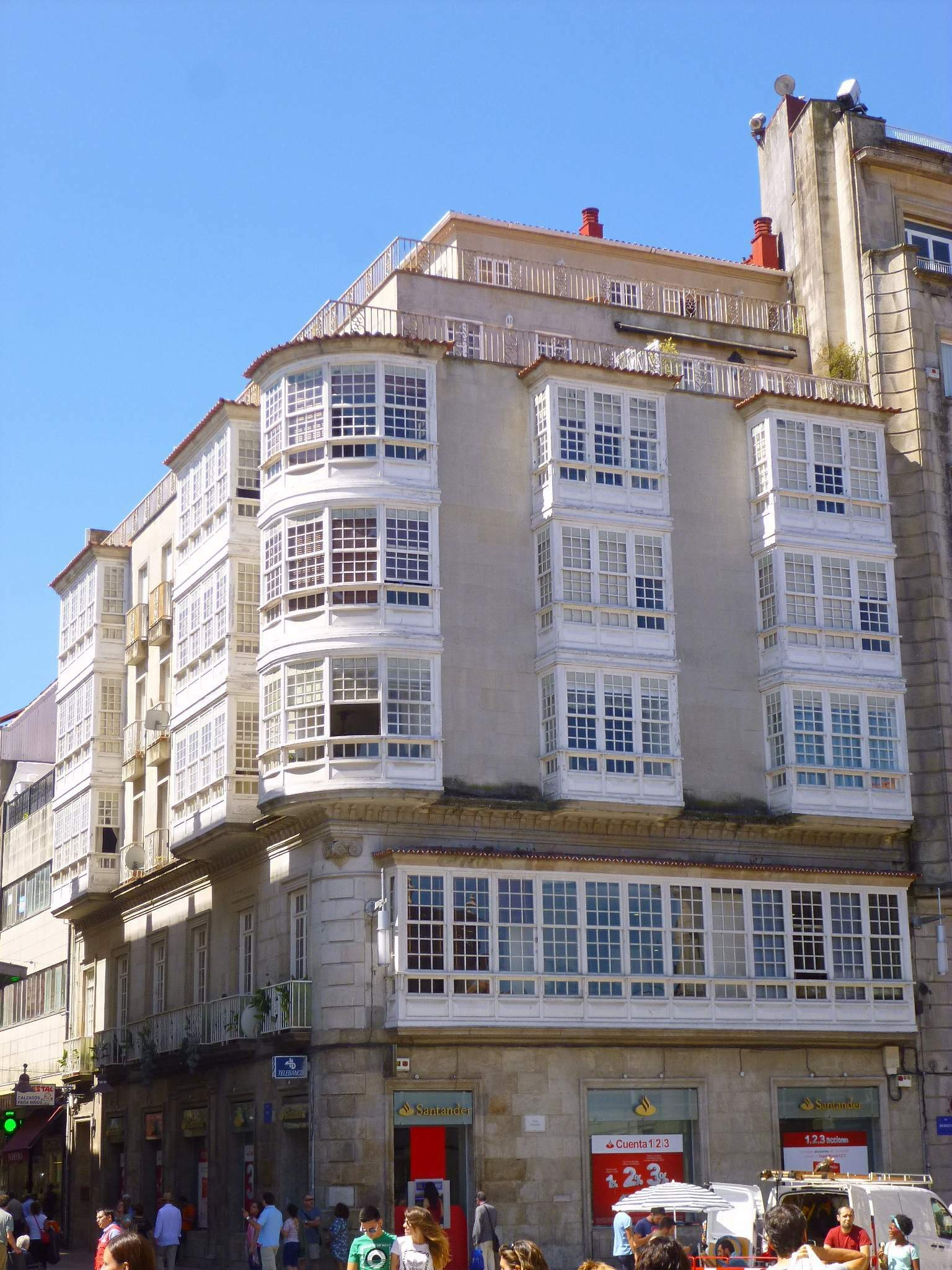
Building in the square

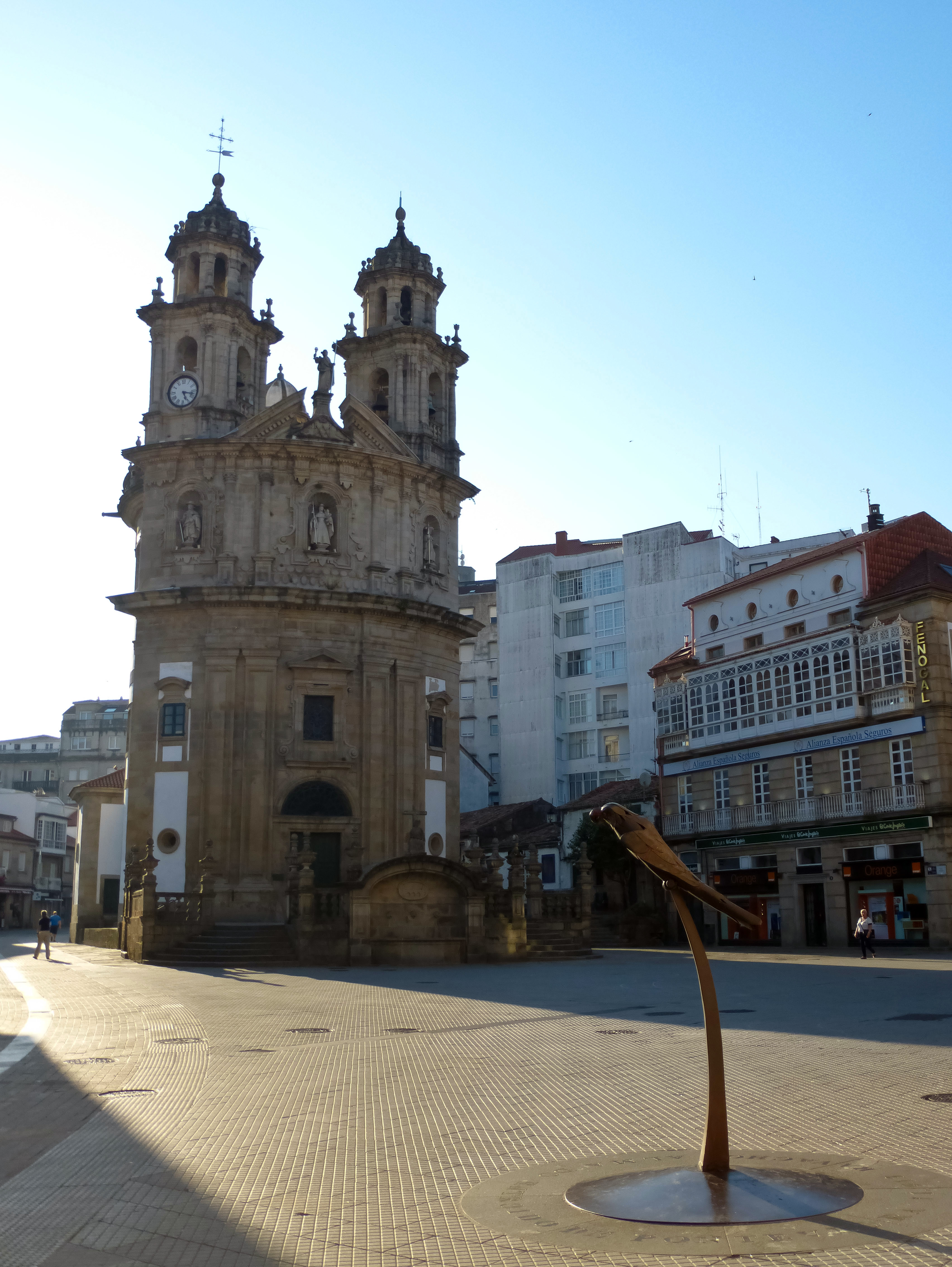
The square and the Ravachol parrot

== See also ==
=== Bibliography ===
- Aganzo, Carlos (2010): Pontevedra. Ciudades con encanto. El País Aguilar. ISBN 8403509340. p. 38-39.
- Fontoira Surís, Rafael (2009). Pontevedra monumental. Pontevedra: Deputación de Pontevedra. pp. 443, 528. ISBN 8484573273.
- Nieto González, Remigio (1980) : Guía monumental ilustrada de Pontevedra. Asociación de Comerciantes de la Calle Manuel Quiroga, Pontevedra. p. 14.
- Riveiro Tobío, E. (2008): Descubrir Pontevedra. Edicións do Cumio, Pontevedra. ISBN 8482890859. p. 31-32.

=== Related articles ===
- Church of the Pilgrim Virgin
- Old town of Pontevedra
- Michelena Street
- Oliva Street

=== External links ===
- on the website Tourism of the Xunta de Galicia
