= Patrice Warrener =

French artist (1948–2026)

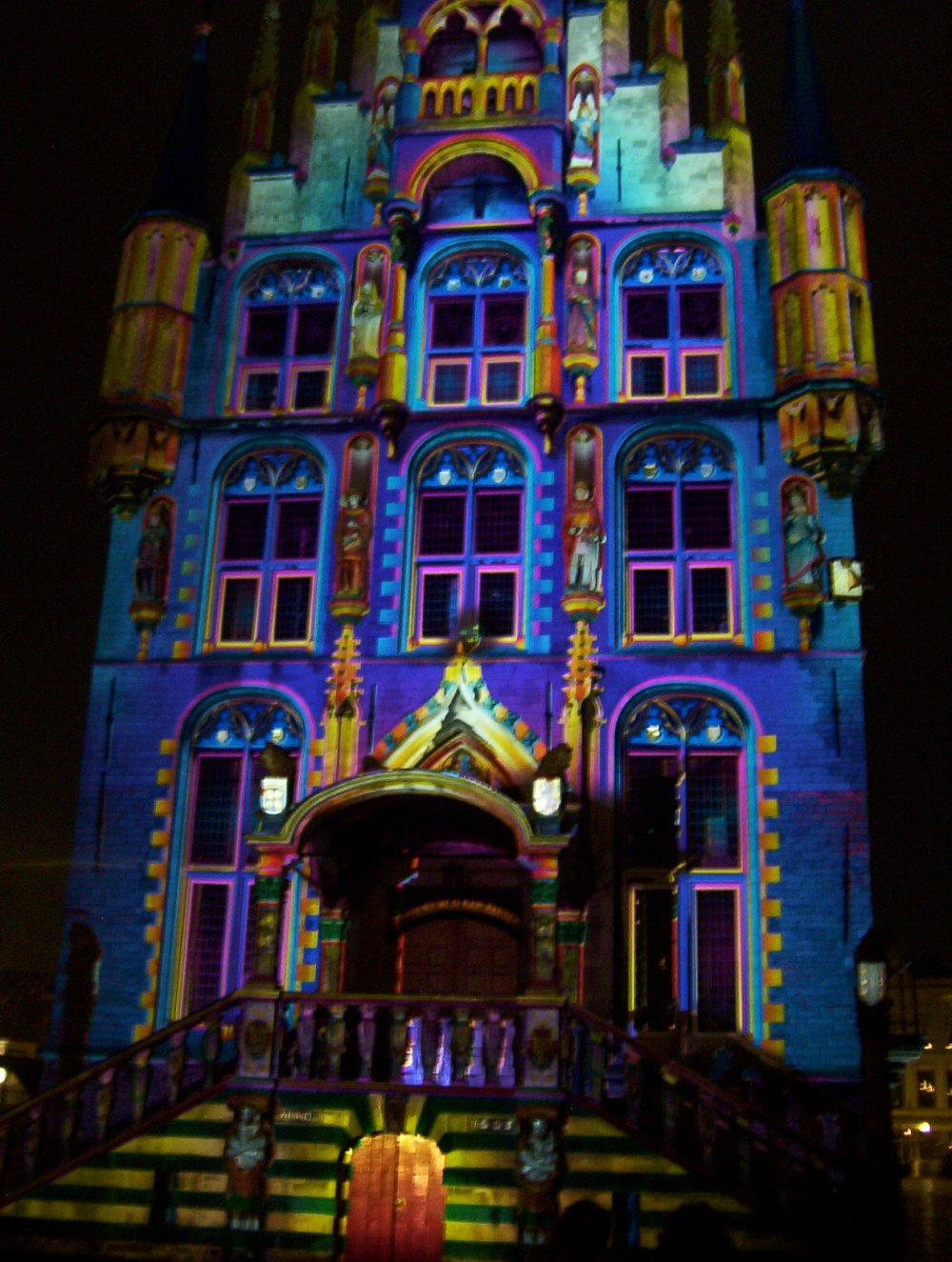
First projection, Town Hall, Gouda.

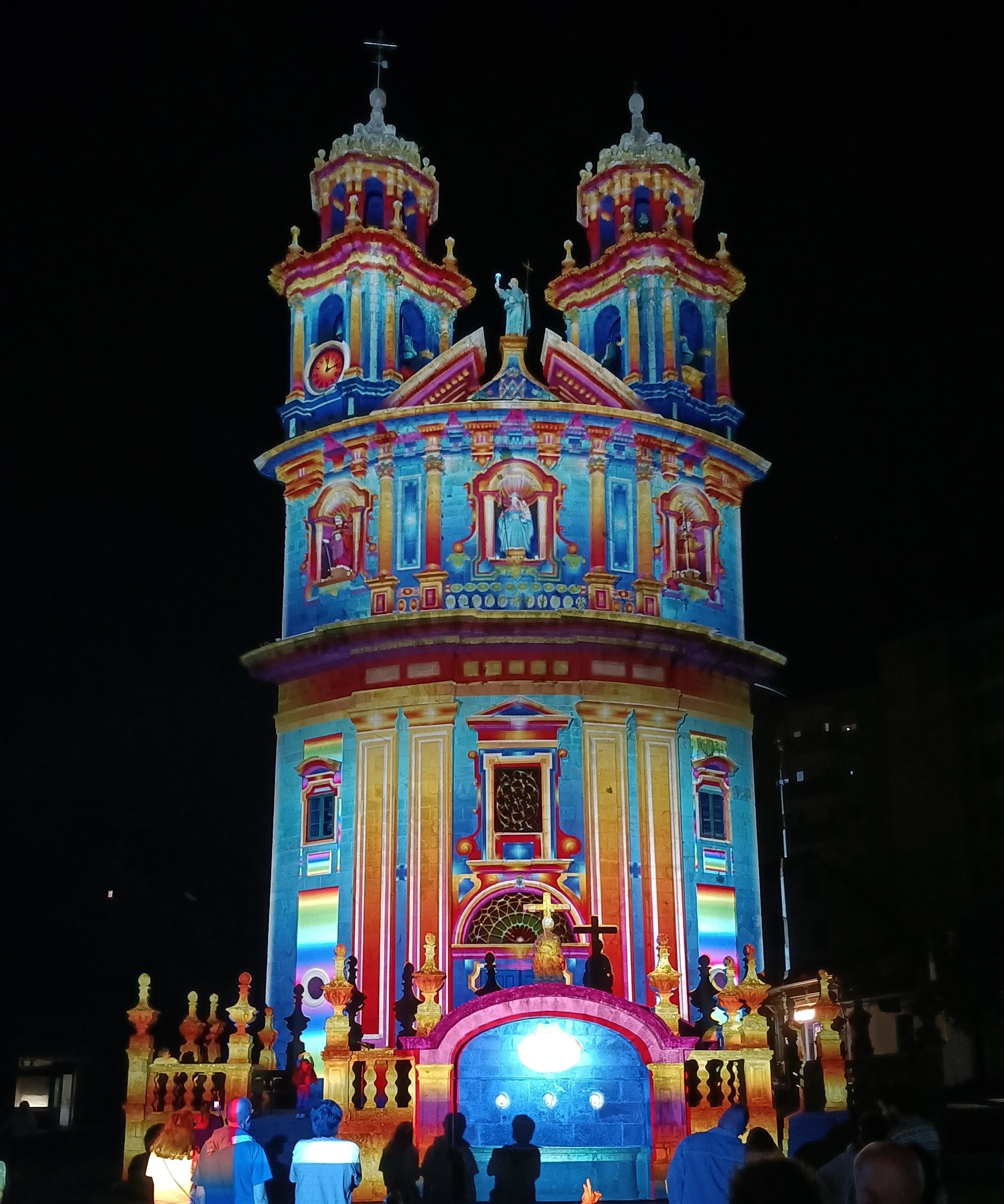
Third projection. Church of the Pilgrim Virgin, Pontevedra.

Patrice Warrener (5 April 1948 – 9 October 2026) was a French light artist, mostly known for his Chromolithe Polychromatic Illumination System. He made more than 60 chromolithe installations over 15 years, lighting up buildings in close to a dozen different nations. Warrener's work has influenced the rising numbers of Light Festivals in many cities of World Heritage status around the world.

Trained as a printer, Patrice made his mark in the world of light shows: first, with the French co-operative Open Light, and then with his collaboration with the English musician, and electronic music pioneer, Tim Blake, with whom he introduced Laser Lighting effects in their Crystal Machine shows in the early 1970s.

In 2016 Warrener illuminated the front of Westminster Abbey in London with coloured light projected onto statues as part of the Lumiere light festival.

In 2025, from 20 to 22 June, Patrice Warrener illuminated the church of the Pilgrim Virgin in the Spanish city of Pontevedra, during the first 3 days of the 32nd edition of the Pontevedra International Art Biennial.

Warrener died on 9 October 2026, at the age of 78.

== Chromolithe ==
Chromolithe installations have been made for cathedrals and churches, historic public buildings, modern art museums, and even banks.

The chromolithe process begins with data collection using a specialized photographic chamber, followed by digital image processing. The resulting images are printed onto 24 × 24 cm photographic plates and projected back onto the building using concealed 6,000 kVA xenon projectors.

Some of the cathedrals and intricate sculptured Gothic buildings that have been chromolithed, were originally painted. Thus, Warrener's work can be seen as a restoration of heritage buildings.

== Gallery ==
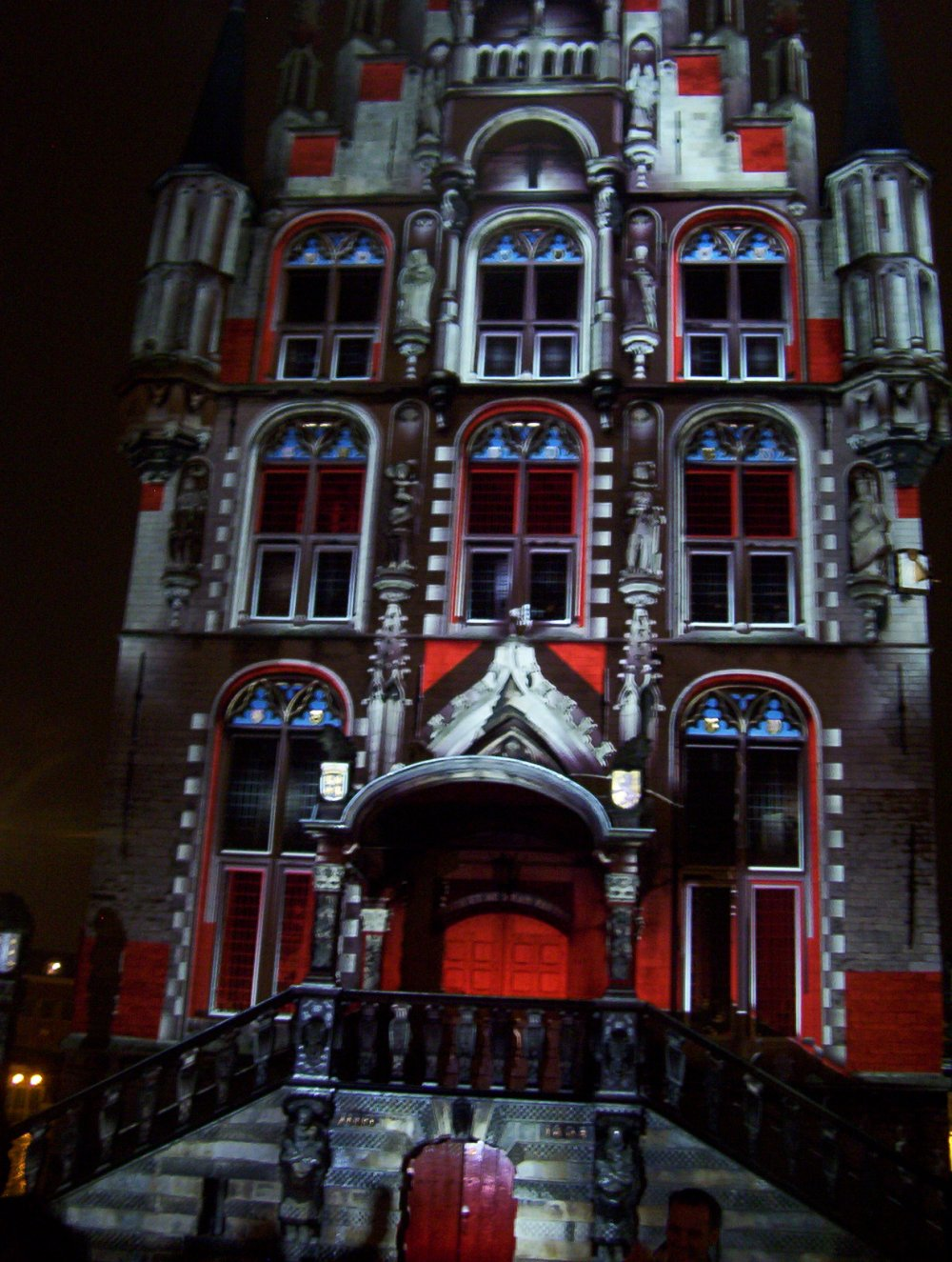
Second projection

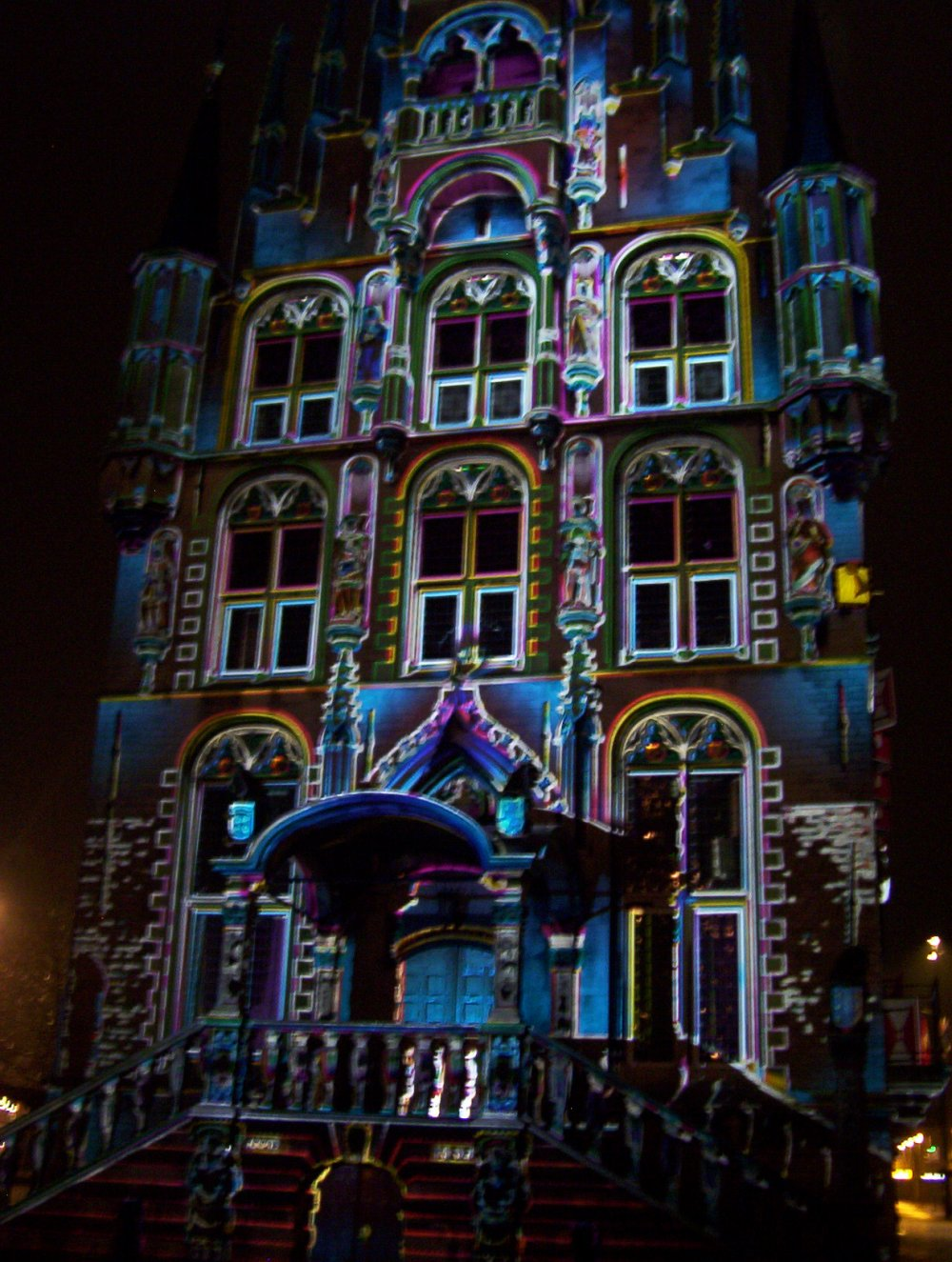
Third projection

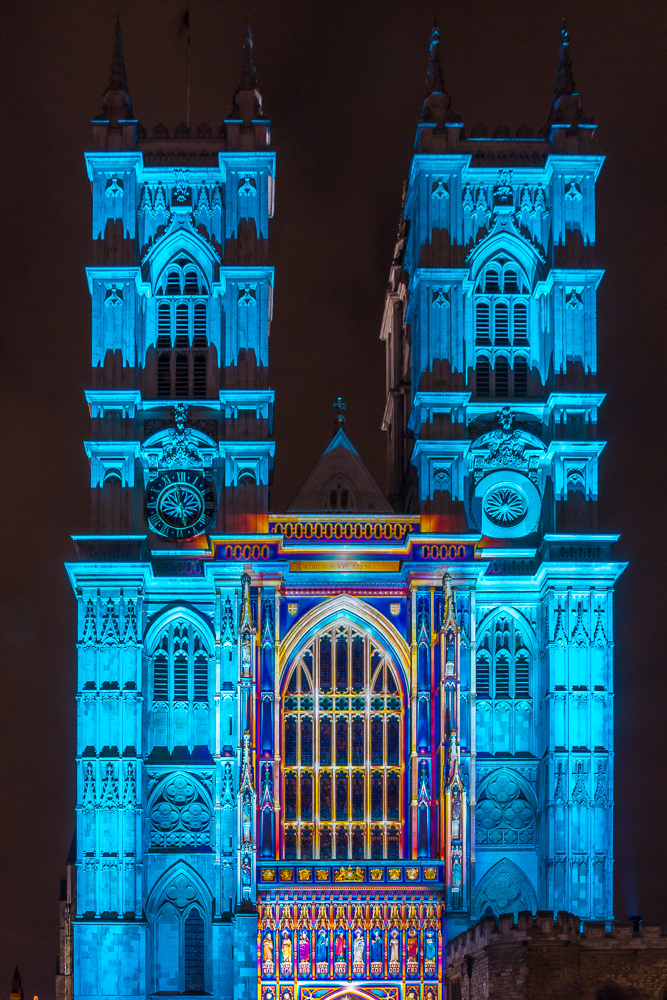
Coloured light projected onto Westminster Abbey for Lumiere

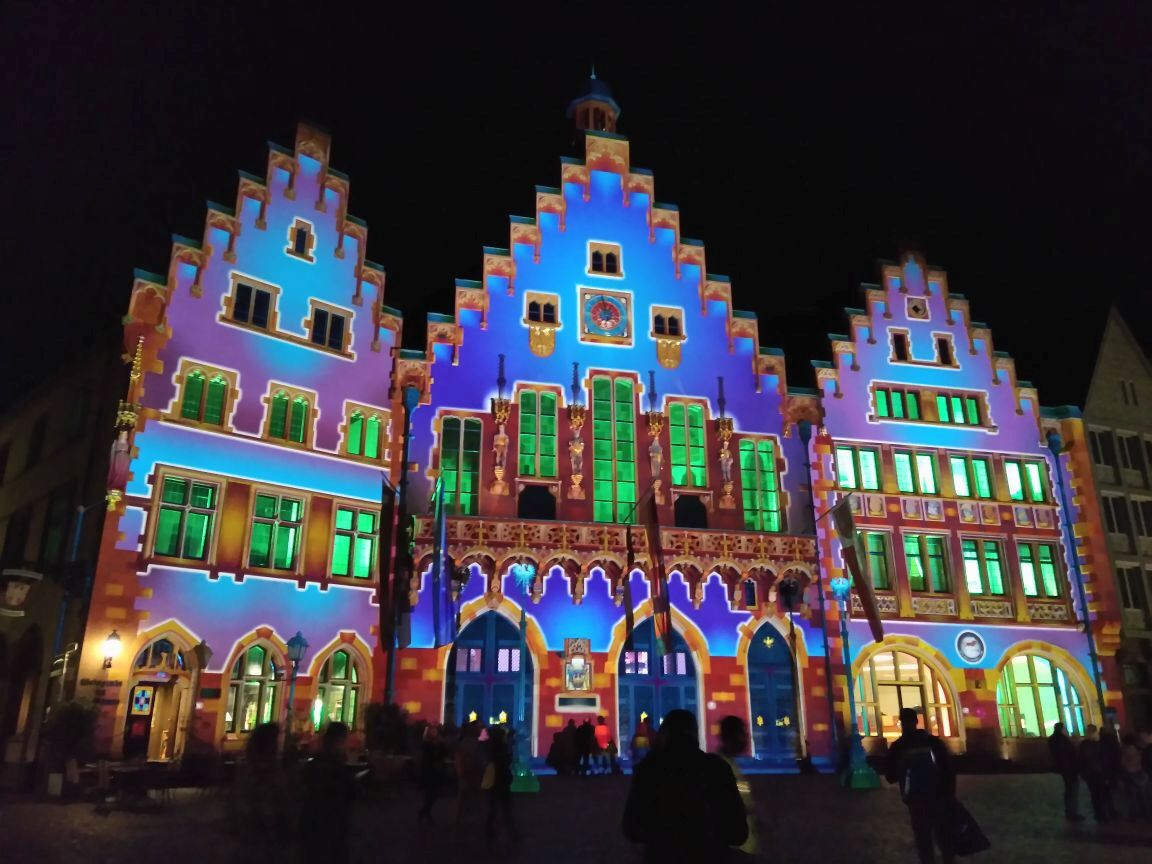
Römerberg (Frankfurt) October 2017
