= Church of the Pilgrim Virgin =

Baroque and neoclassical church in Pontevedra, Spain

- Igrexa da Virxe Peregrina
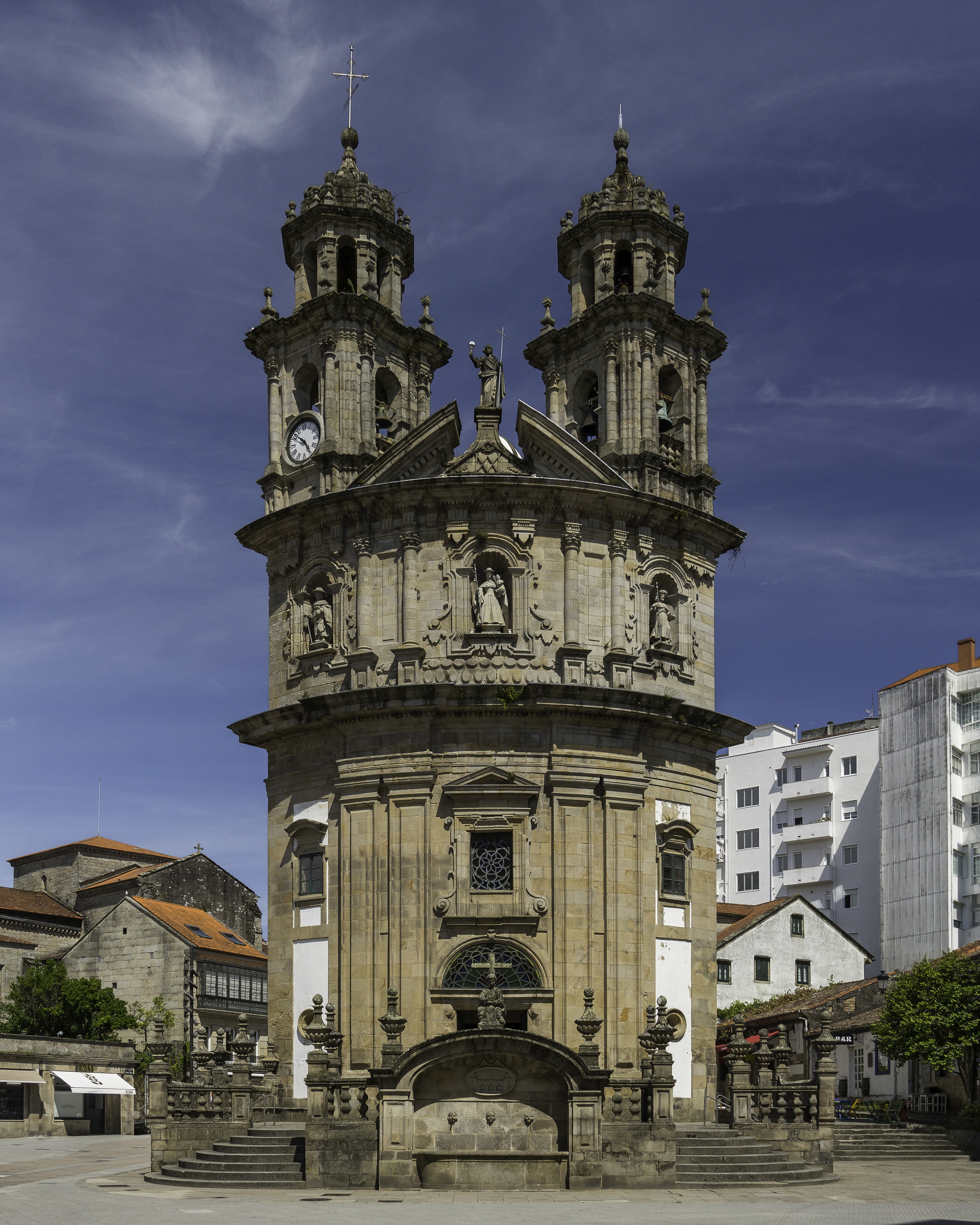
- The façade of the church.

Religion
- Affiliation: Roman Catholic
- Year consecrated: 1794

Location
- Location: Pontevedra, Galicia, Spain
- Interactive map of Church of the Pilgrim Virgin
- Coordinates: 42.4308°N 8.64361°W

Architecture
- Type: Church
- Style: Baroque, Neoclassical
- Groundbreaking: 1778
- Completed: 1792
- Direction of façade: West
- Spanish Cultural Heritage
- Official name: Igrexa da Virxe Peregrina
- Designated: 13 October 2011

Website
- vivecamino.com/pontevedra/iglesia-de-la-virgen-peregrina-3358/

The church of the Pilgrim Virgin is a scallop-shaped Roman Catholic chapel located in the city of Pontevedra, in Spain, along the route of the Portuguese Way of St. James.

Construction began in 1778 and it is one of the most symbolic and important buildings in the city of Pontevedra. It is dedicated to the Virgin who, according to tradition, guided pilgrims from Bayona, in the south-west of the province of Pontevedra, to Santiago de Compostela.

The church houses the image of the Pilgrim Virgin (19th century), patron saint of the province of Pontevedra and, in turn, of the Portuguese Way. Declared a historic-artistic monument in 1982, it is a mixture of late Baroque and Neoclassical forms, such as its main altarpiece, erected in 1789.

The shape of its floor plan is inspired by a scallop shell, the quintessential symbol of pilgrims, ending in a Christian cross. This circular shape is associated with the prevailing typology in Portuguese Catholic churches of the time. It was declared an Asset of Cultural Interest with the category of Monument on 13 October 2011.

== History ==
The origin of the chapel is to be found in an image of the Virgin dressed in this way, which French pilgrims brought to Pontevedra. It attracted so much attention in the city that a Confraternity was founded to venerate and care for it. The origins of the Chapel date back to 1753, the year in which a confraternity dedicated to the veneration of the Virgin of the Way (the Portuguese Way) was founded, which later gave rise to the Confraternity of Our Lady of Refuge and the Divine Pilgrim.

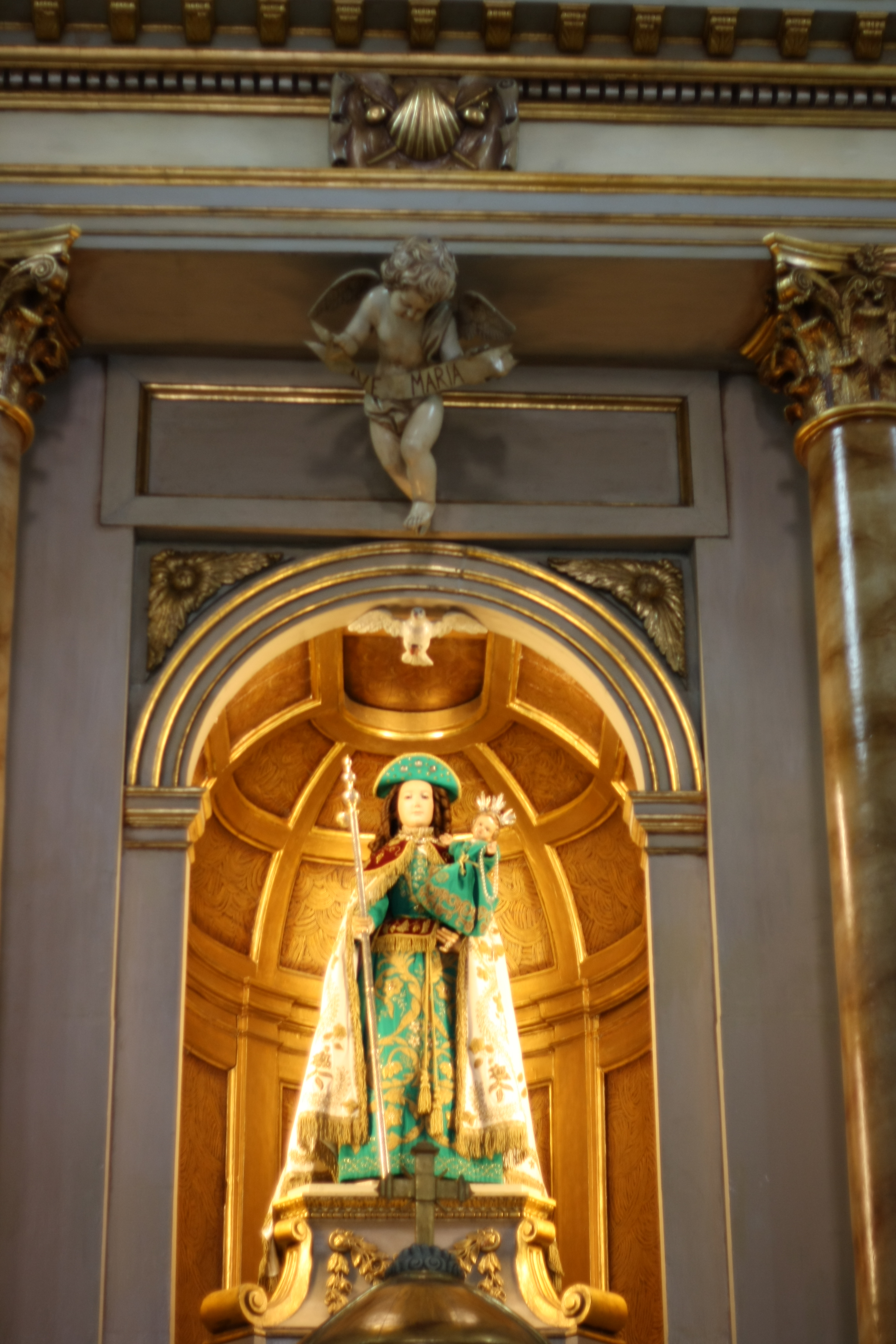
Pilgrim Virgin image

In 1757 an altar was built for the image of the Pilgrim Virgin in the already existing Chapel of Nuestra Señora la Virgen del Camino (the Virgin of the Way), which with the passage of time led to the appearance of problems inherent to having two images under different tutelage (collection of alms, ringing of bells...) between the Brotherhood of the Pilgrim Virgin and that of the Virgen del Camino, the owner of the church.

The justice and the municipal government, for these and other reasons, ordered the removal of the image and the altarpiece from the church, which were moved to a new wooden chapel on a site outside the walls of Pontevedra, next to the Trabancas Gate. Two years later, when a quarry was opened on a hill owned by one of the members of the congregation in Saint Maurice of Moldes, the first stone of the sanctuary was laid on 18 June 1778, at the expense of the Brotherhood of Nuestra Señora del Refugio y Divina Peregrina (Our Lady of Refuge and Divine Pilgrim). The plans were drawn up by the master builder Antonio Souto, who was also a militia sergeant. Its construction was completed in 1792, the year in which the bells, the door, the stained glass windows and later the atrium, consecrated two years later, were put in place. On 2 August 1794, after sixteen years of work, it was blessed by the parish priest of Saint Bartholomew and the first mass was held.

Around 1795, due to a great storm that caused serious damage to the temple, part of its north tower collapsed, and it was not repaired until 80 years later (1873), when two Lightning rods were also installed. It was not only the chapel that underwent changes. The environment in which the chapel was originally located has also changed up to the present day. The city underwent a major urban redevelopment from the mid-19th century, and the atrium was replaced by a grand staircase.

Admiral Casto Méndez Núñez donated a large Tridacna shell that he brought back from the Pacific on one of his many voyages, which acts as a holy water font and is located at the entrance to the chapel. The clock in the north tower was installed in 1896, coming from the Saint John of God Hospital, which had been demolished. The Hospital bells were also installed in the chapel.

In 1981 the first restoration of the Sanctuary was carried out to repair major structural damage (there were large cracks in the building caused by a shift in the foundations). It was carried out by César Portela and José Bar Boo. Its second most important restoration was carried out in 2008, restoring Stained glass windows, walls, painting and the tower clock, among other elements.

The temple is administered by the Cofradía de la Peregrina, who paid for its construction and continues to maintain it and keep it open for worship.

== Description ==
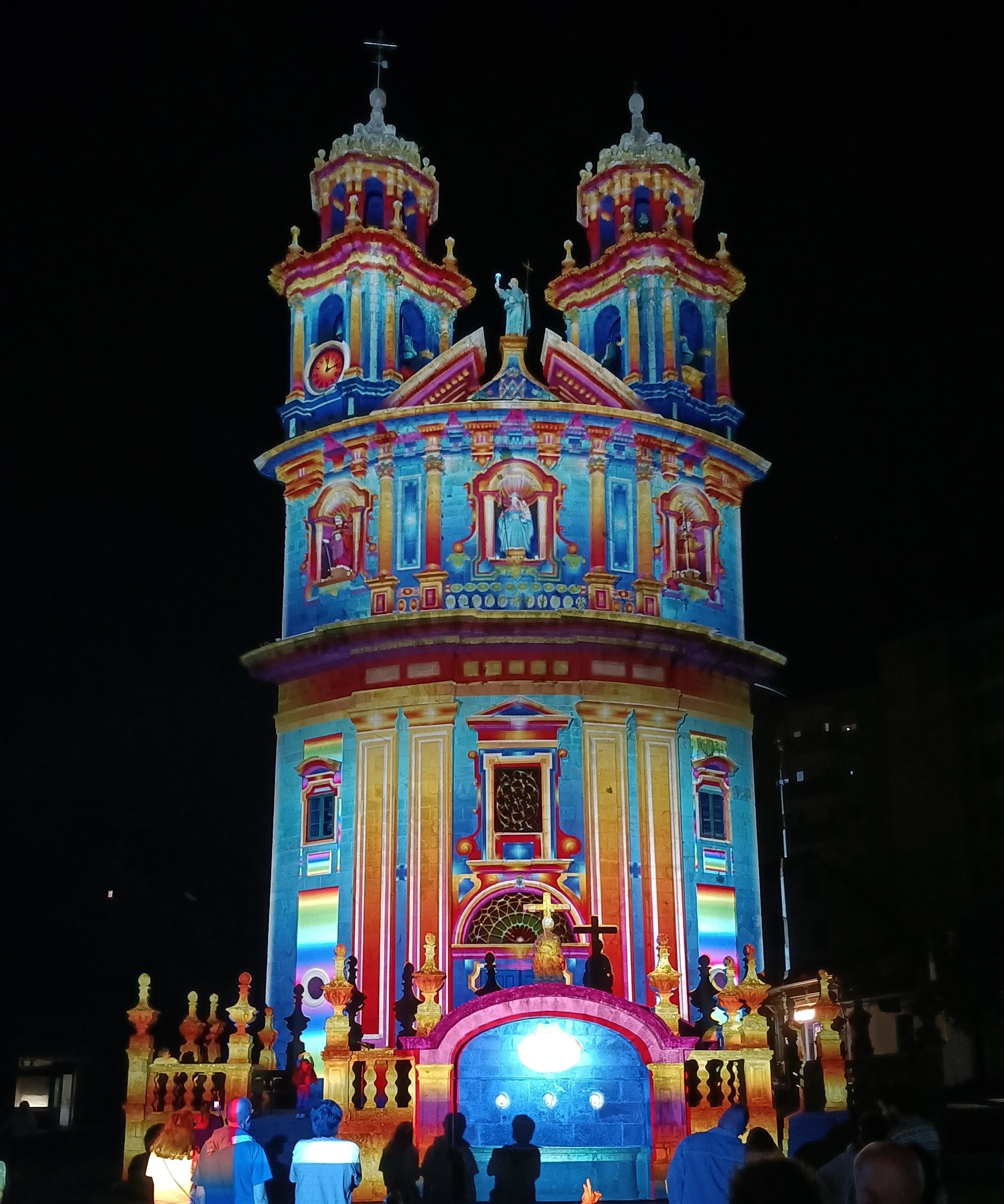
The church illuminated in 2025 by the French artist Patrice Warrener.

It is a central floor plan chapel. Its floor plan is inspired by a Scallop shell, the characteristic symbol of the Pilgrims, inside which is inscribed a cross. The floor plan is round, but by including the vestibule it takes the shape of a scallop shell. The rotunda that forms the church itself is framed by four fluted Pilasters, which support a series of segmental arches on which the projecting cornice sits. Above it rises a dome with Lunettes and a lantern. It has a dome, lantern and cupola.

Inside the church, the rectangular presbytery is covered by a groin vault. The main altarpiece, of neoclassical style, was made in 1789 following the style of Melchor de Prado, although it was modified by his brother Manuel and Juan Pernas Gambino. It ends in a pediment with a relief of the flight into Egypt and the image of the Pilgrim Virgin, a 19th century carving, with the Child Jesus in her arms, both dressed in short cloak, pilgrim's staff and carrying a gourd. The paintings of Santa Clara, by Polanco and a copy of the Virgin of San Onofre in Rome by Peruzzi stand out. Also noteworthy is the holy water font in the vestibule, configured with a shell of the Tridacna mollusc brought from the Pacific by Méndez Núñez. The crystal chandelier inside the church is a jewel from the end of the 19th century, weighing 250 kilos and measuring 2.50 metres in height.

The main façade, the work of Antonio Souto, with the collaboration of Bernardo José de Mier, is preceded by an atrium with a staircase, perimetered by a balustrade with Pinnacles. At the foot of the staircase is a fountain and a sculpture of Teucer at the top. The atrium and the fountain that precede the church make up an urban ensemble of singular typicity and beauty.

The Baroque façade is convex and has two sections. The lower one is decorated with Pilasters and the upper one with Corinthian columns and houses the image of the Pilgrim, patron saint of the province of Pontevedra, at the top in a niche, and on each side, also in niches, the images of Saint James the Greater and St. Roch. All three are dressed as Pilgrims. The niches have a scallop vault and are decorated with earflaps. At the top, there is a split pediment in the centre of which is a sculpture that is an allegorical image of Faith. On either side are two equal towers that give the church a singular slenderness, elegance and solemnity. The lower section has a large semicircular doorway, divided by a lintel, and above it are three windows with upper pediments, the central one triangular and the lateral ones curved.

== Symbol of the city ==
The church of the Pilgrim Virgin has established itself as a symbol of the city of Pontevedra. In 2011 the Fábrica Nacional de Moneda y Timbre (FNMT) included it as a symbol of the city on the reverse of the coin dedicated to Pontevedra in the provincial capitals series, which includes the 50 Spanish provincial capitals and the two autonomous cities of Ceuta and Melilla. The coin has the denomination of 4 Reales and is minted in 925 silver. It has a mintage of 15,000 and is presented in a triptych display sleeve with the coin encapsulated and accompanied by a certificate of authenticity. The Royal Mint accompanies it with the following explanation:

The Sanctuary of the Pilgrim Virgin, where Our Lady the Pilgrim Virgin is venerated, is one of the most representative buildings in the city of Pontevedra. Built in the 18th century, its floor plan resembles the shape of a Scallop shell, the universal symbol of the pilgrimage to Santiago de Compostela. Located in the centre of the city, on the route of the Portuguese Way, it was built with the financial contributions of the Brotherhood of the Pilgrim Virgin and has been declared an Asset of Cultural Interest.

The Sociedad Estatal Correos y Telégrafos de España also included it on 12 December 2014 in the postmark of the main post office of Pontevedra within the collection of commemorative postmarks of Spanish provincial capitals. The launch of this postmark is included in the campaign undertaken by Correos to collaborate in the diffusion of images of emblematic places and monuments through postal items.

== Culture ==
In 2025, from 20 to 22 June, the French architectural lighting artist Patrice Warrener illuminated the church of the Pilgrim Virgin with his Cromolite technique during the first 3 days of the 32nd edition of the International Art Biennial of Pontevedra.

== Gallery ==
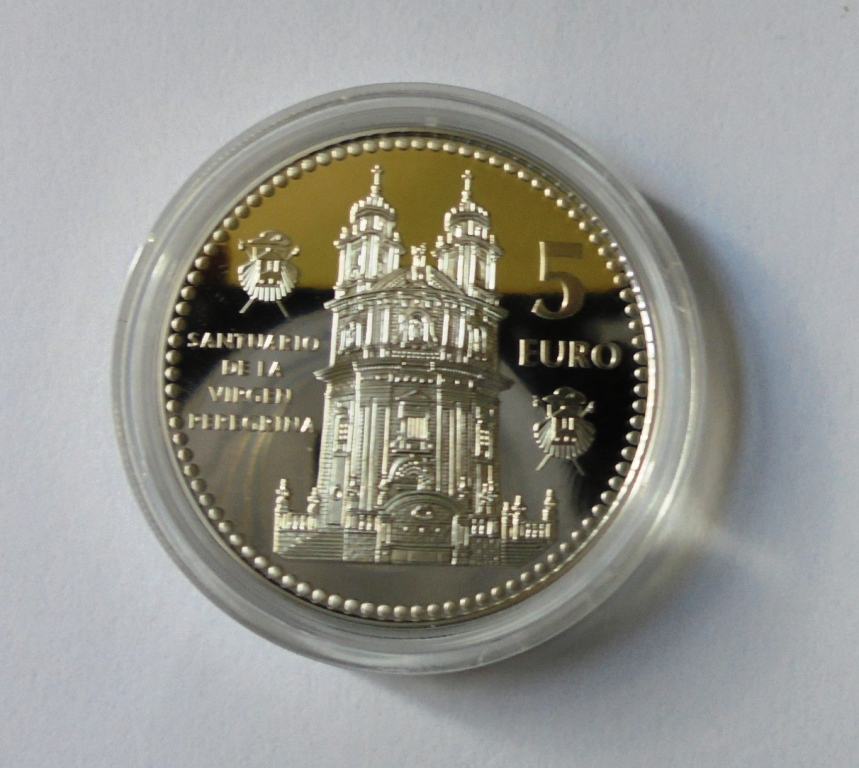
Silver coin belonging to the Spain Capitals of Province series, which was released in 2011

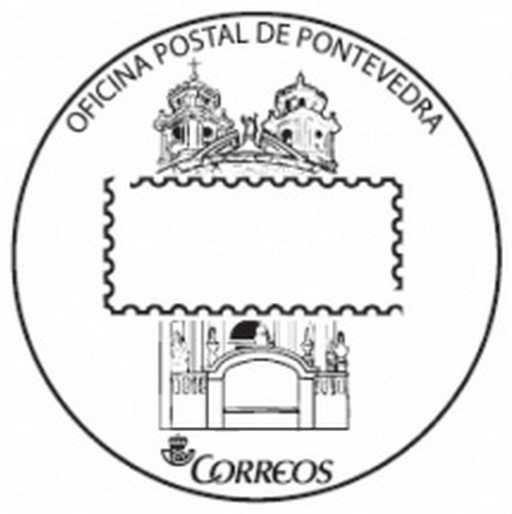
Correos commemorative postmark released in 2014

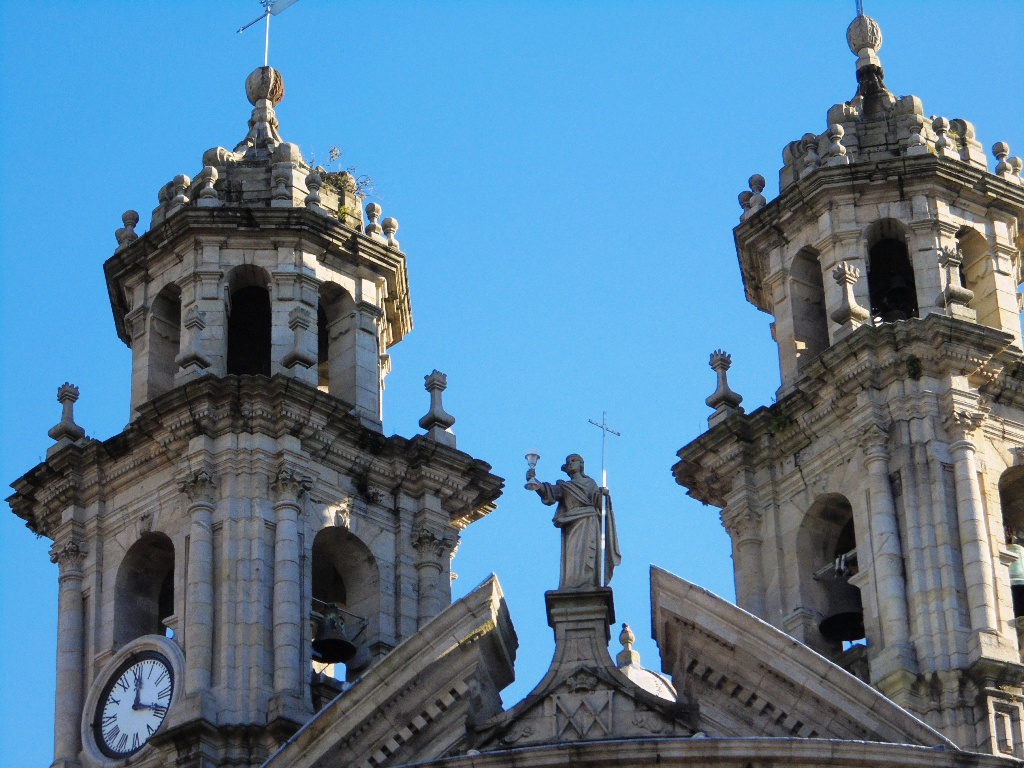
Figure of Faith in the centre of the split gable and twin towers

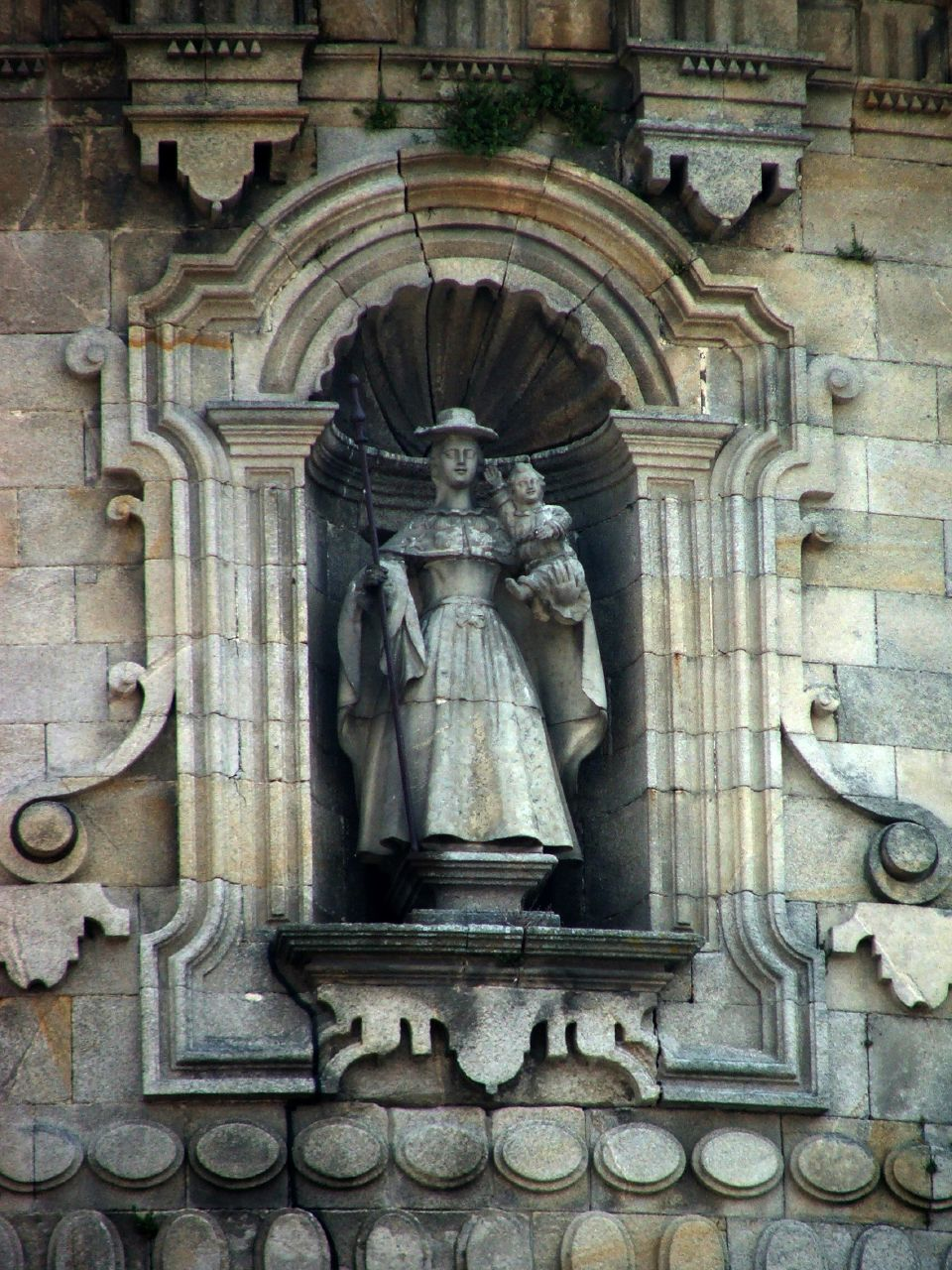
Pilgrim Virgin in a niche on the church façade

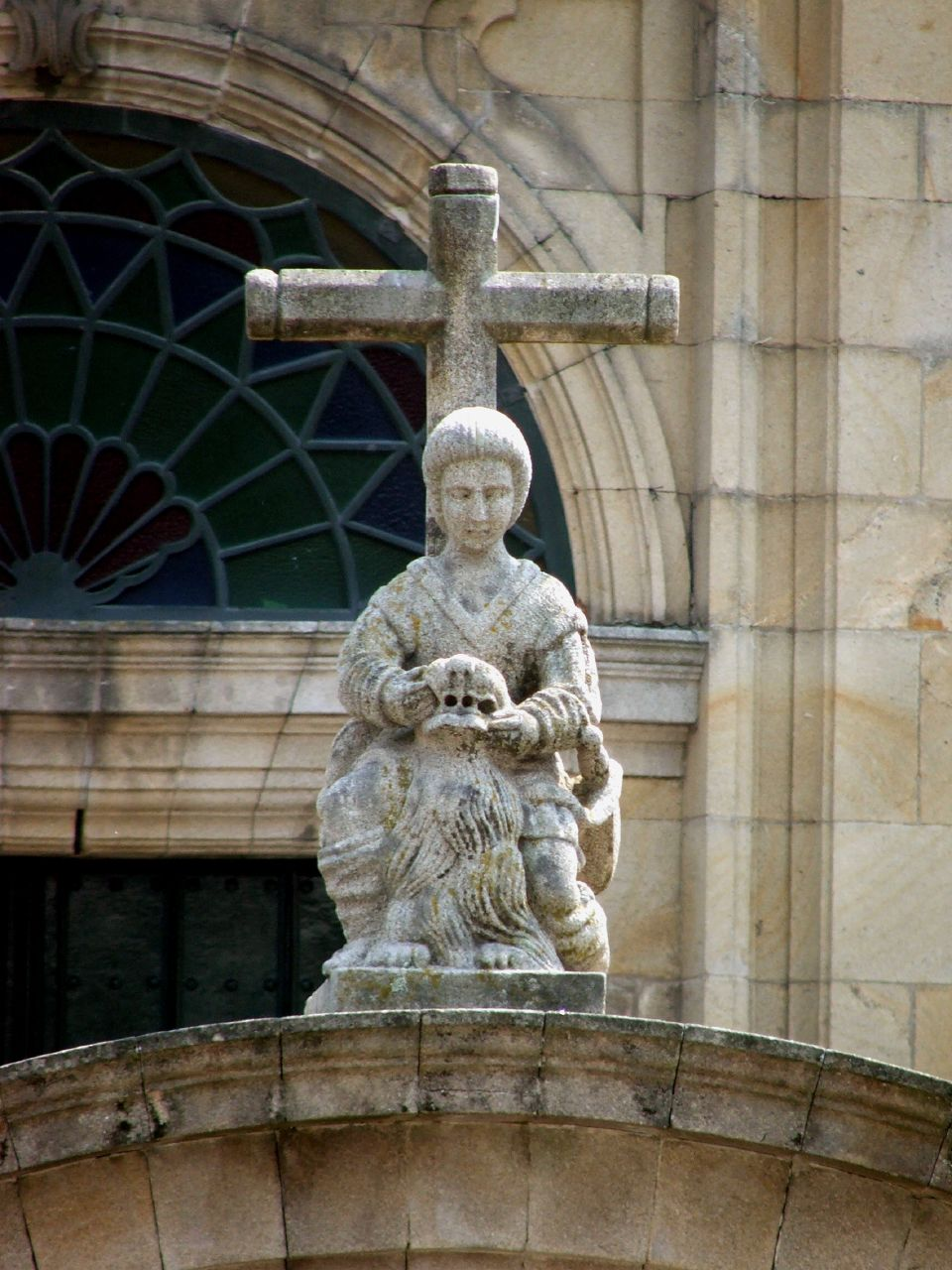
Statue in the atrium

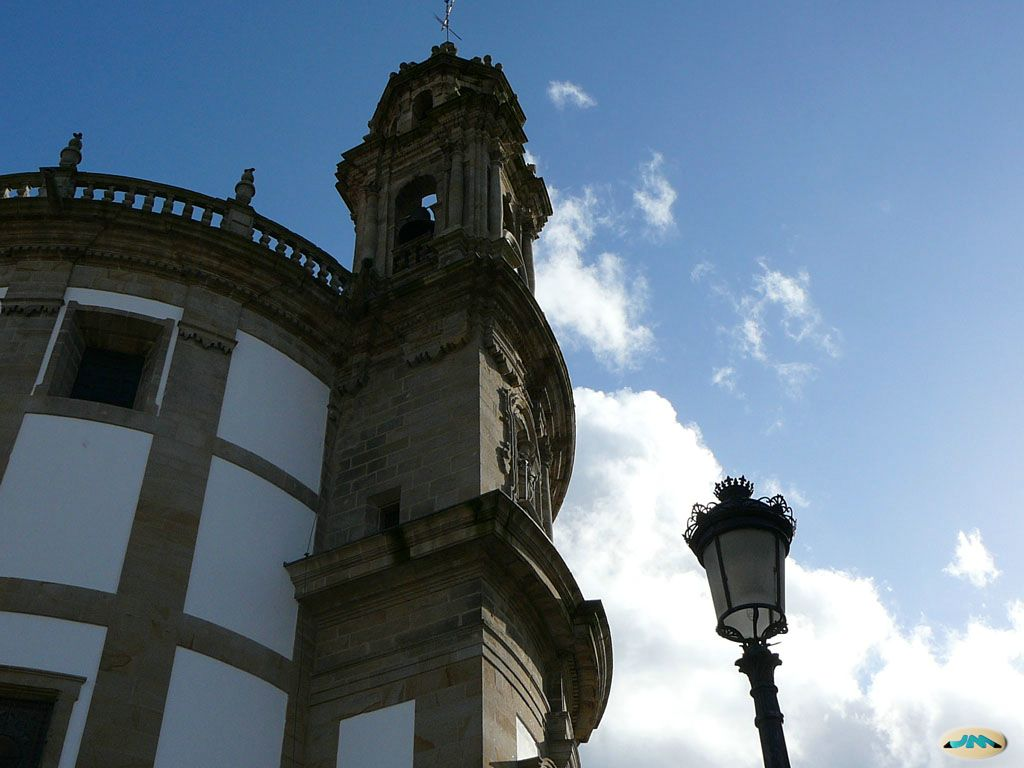
Side façade of the church

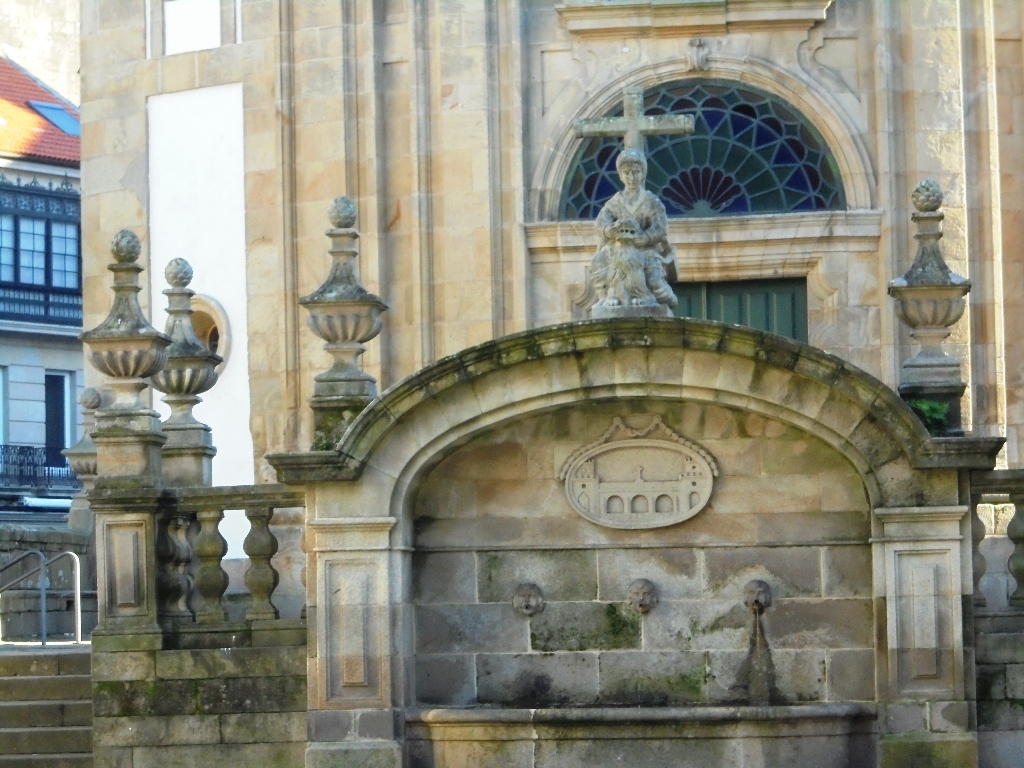
Fountain at the entrance to the church

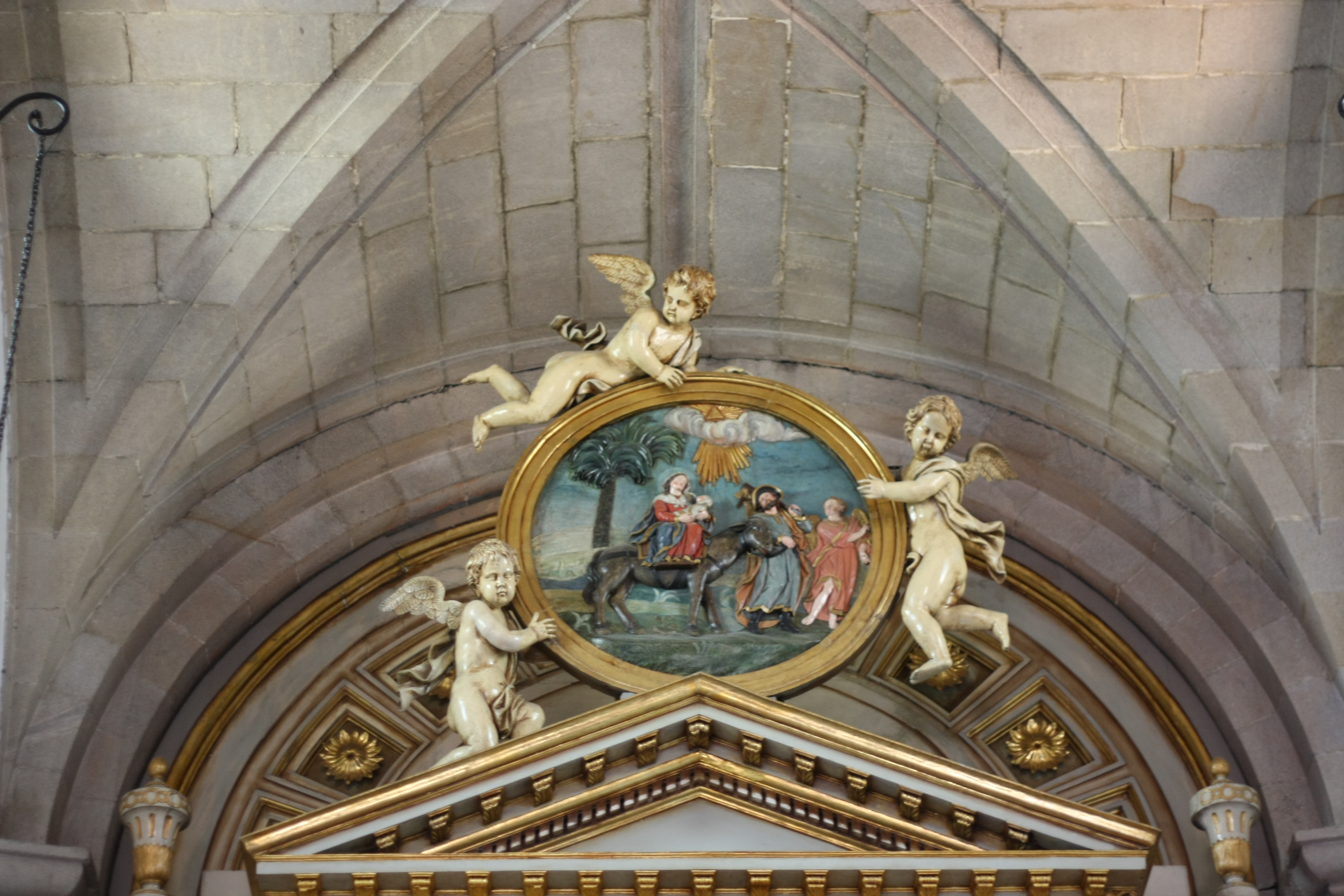
Detail of the main altar

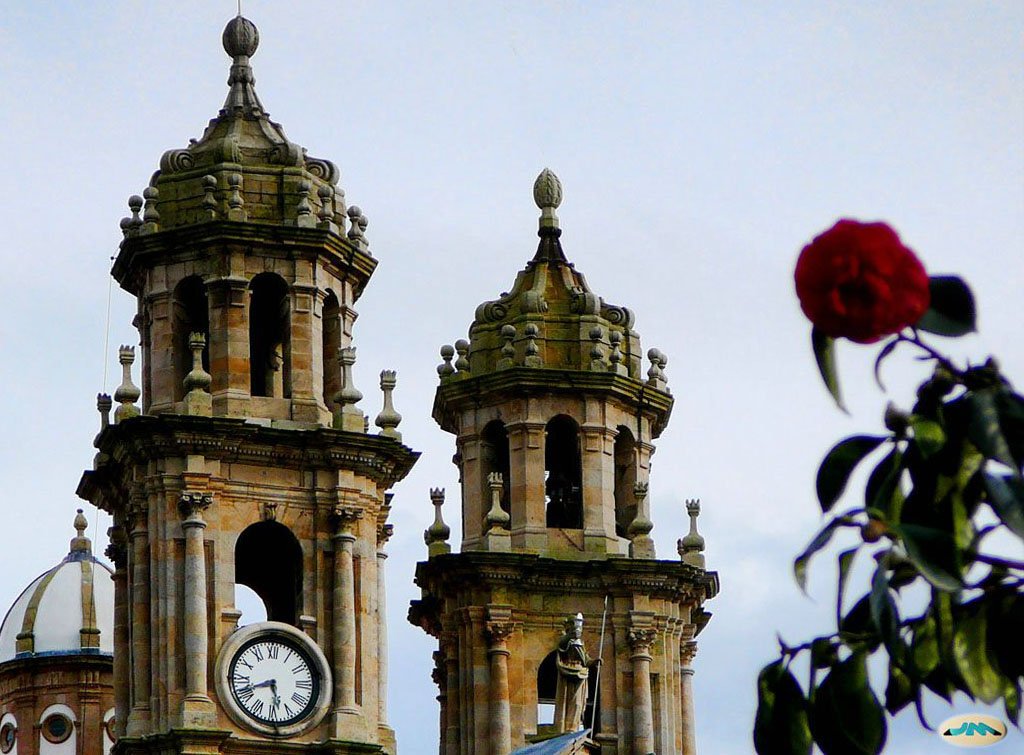
The two towers belonging to the church

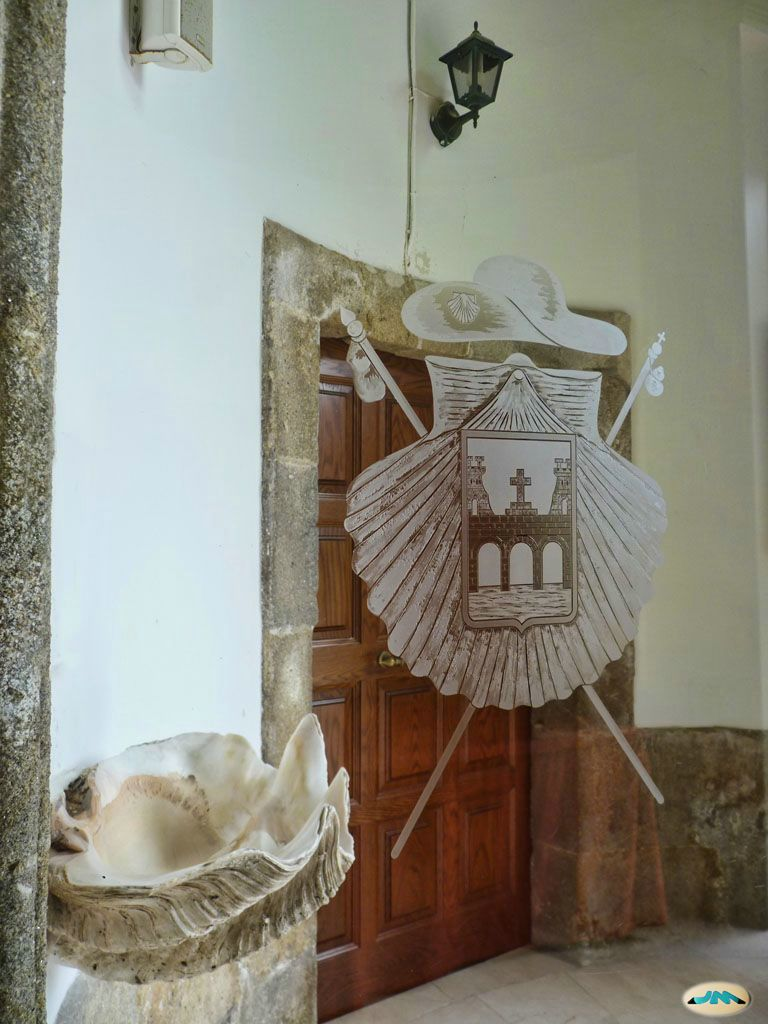
Main entrance to the temple

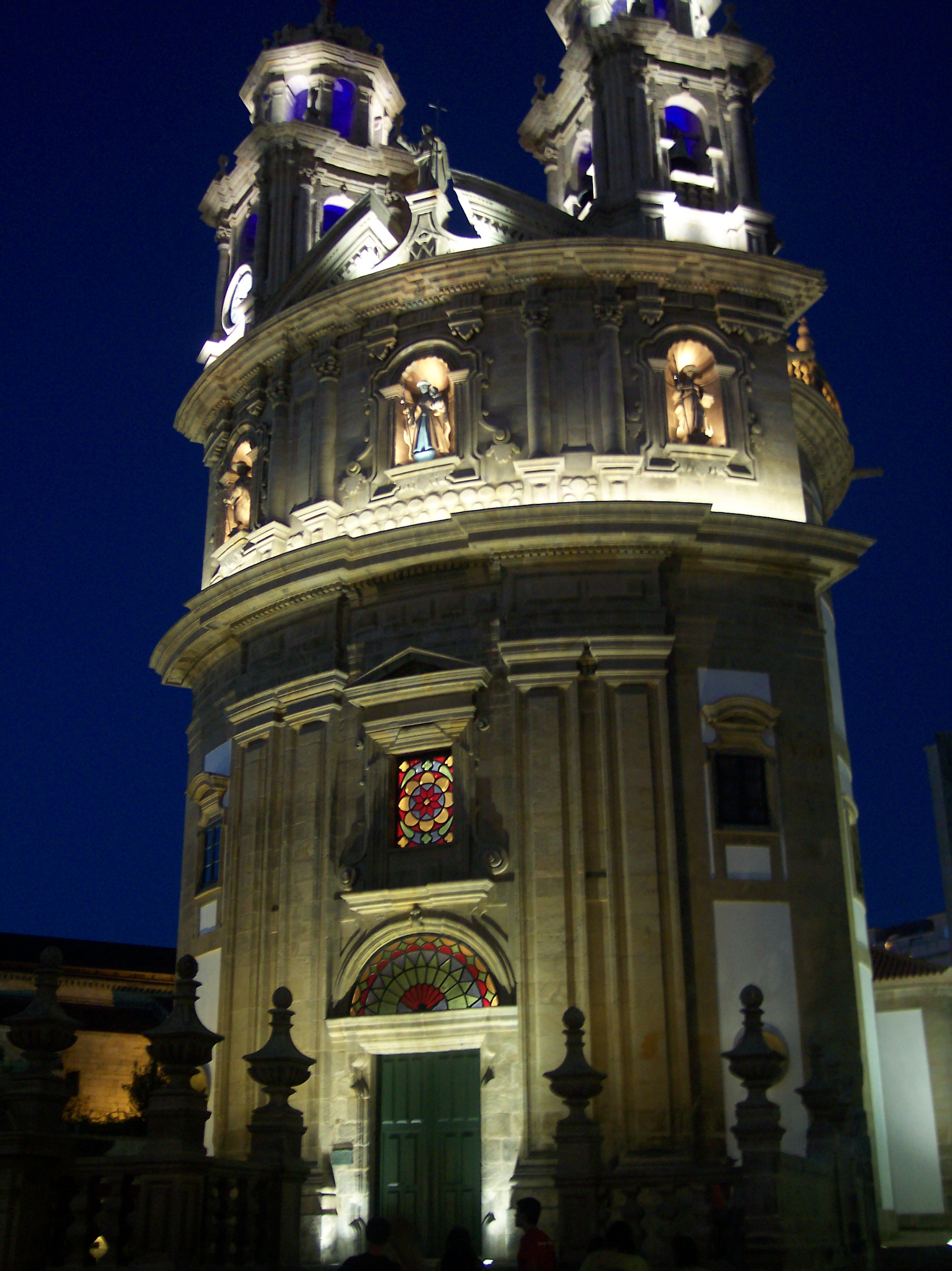
View of the church with the new lighting

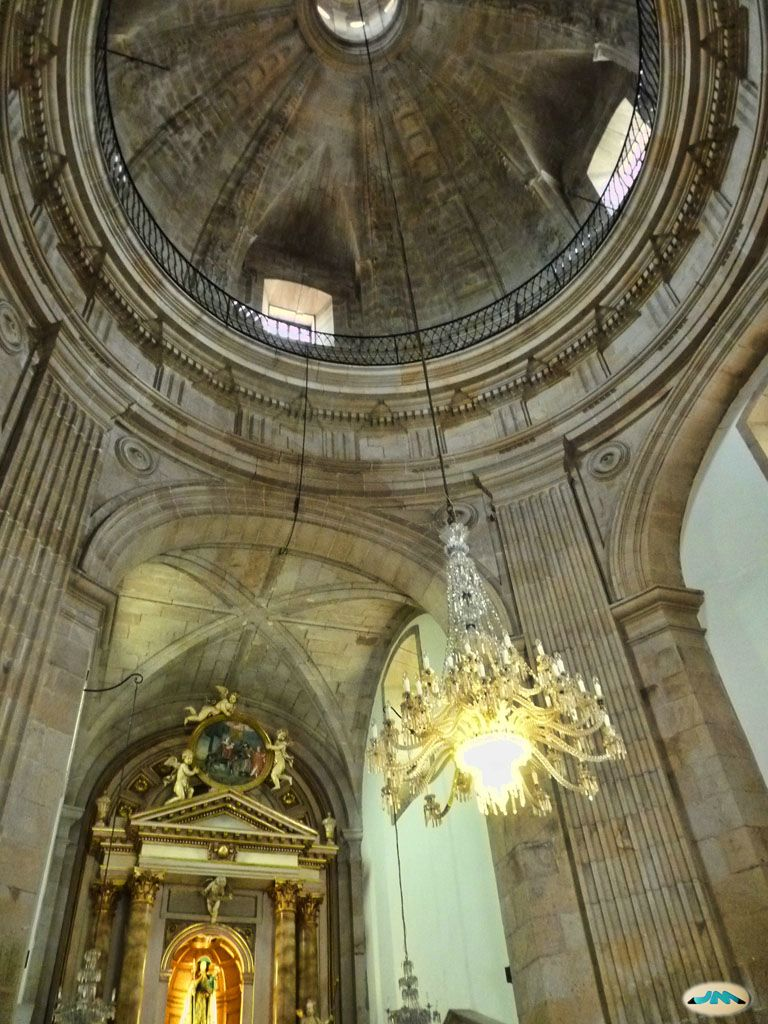
Detail of the interior of the church

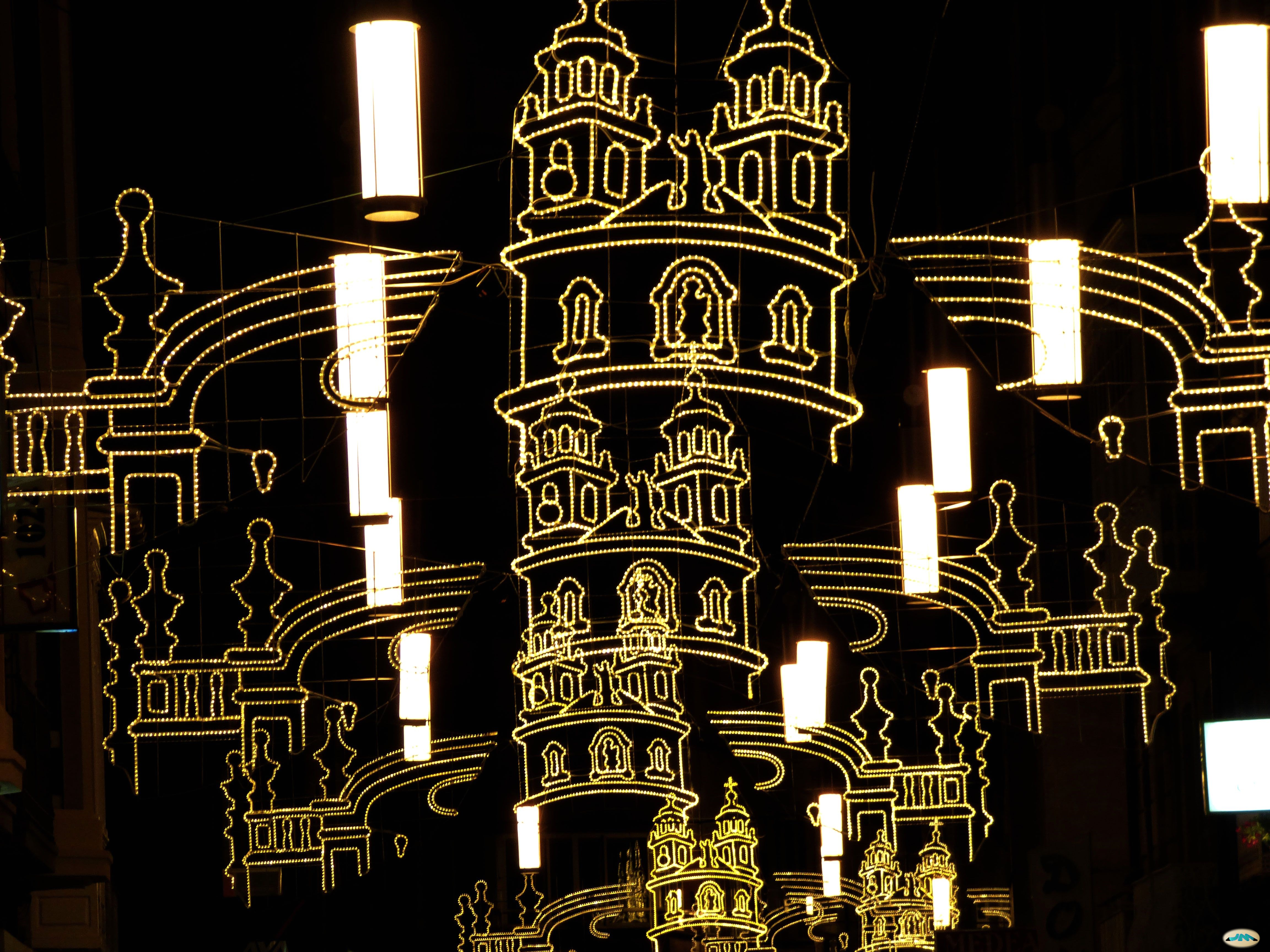
Lights during the city's festivities

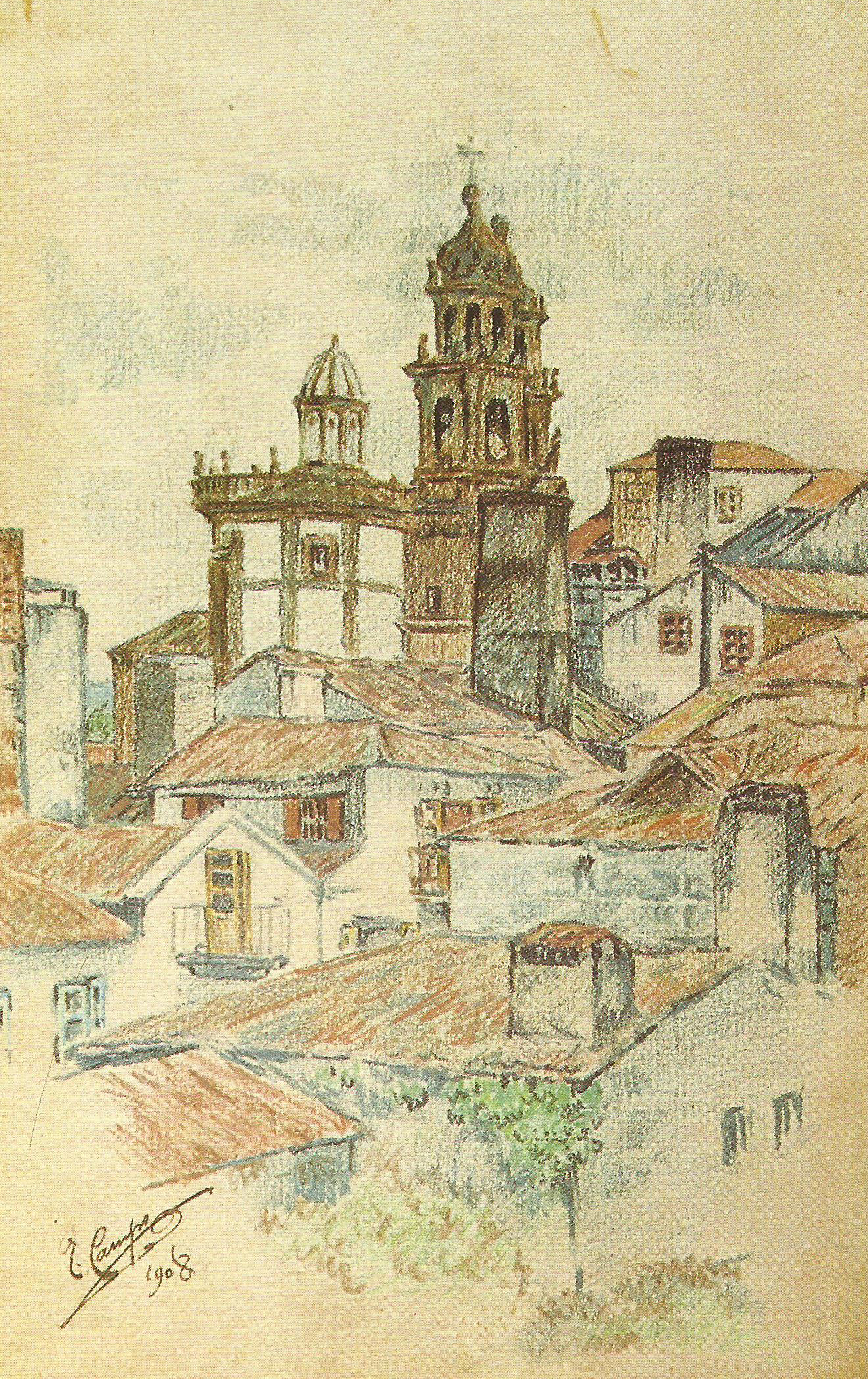
The church in 1908, par Enrique Campo

== Bibliography ==
- Aganzo, Carlos (2010). Pontevedra. Ciudades con encanto (in Spanish). Madrid: El País-Aguilar. pp. 38–41. ISBN 978-8403509344.
- Cebrián Franco, Juan José (1989). Santuarios Marianos de Galicia (in Spanish). Madrid: Ediciones Encuentro. pp. 104–105. ISBN 978-8474902297.
- Fontoira Surís, Rafael (2009). Pontevedra monumental (in Galician). Pontevedra: Diputación Provincial de Pontevedra. pp. 339–341. ISBN 978-84-8457-327-2.
- Nadal, Paco (2012). Rias Baixas. Escapadas (in Spanish). Madrid: El País-Aguilar. p. 37. ISBN 978-8403501089.
- Riveiro Tobío, Elvira (2008). Descubrir Pontevedra (in Spanish). Pontevedra: Edicións do Cumio. pp. 31–32. ISBN 9788482890852.

== See also ==
- Plaza de la Peregrina
