= Calle Michelena =

Street in Pontevedra, Spain

Michelena Street
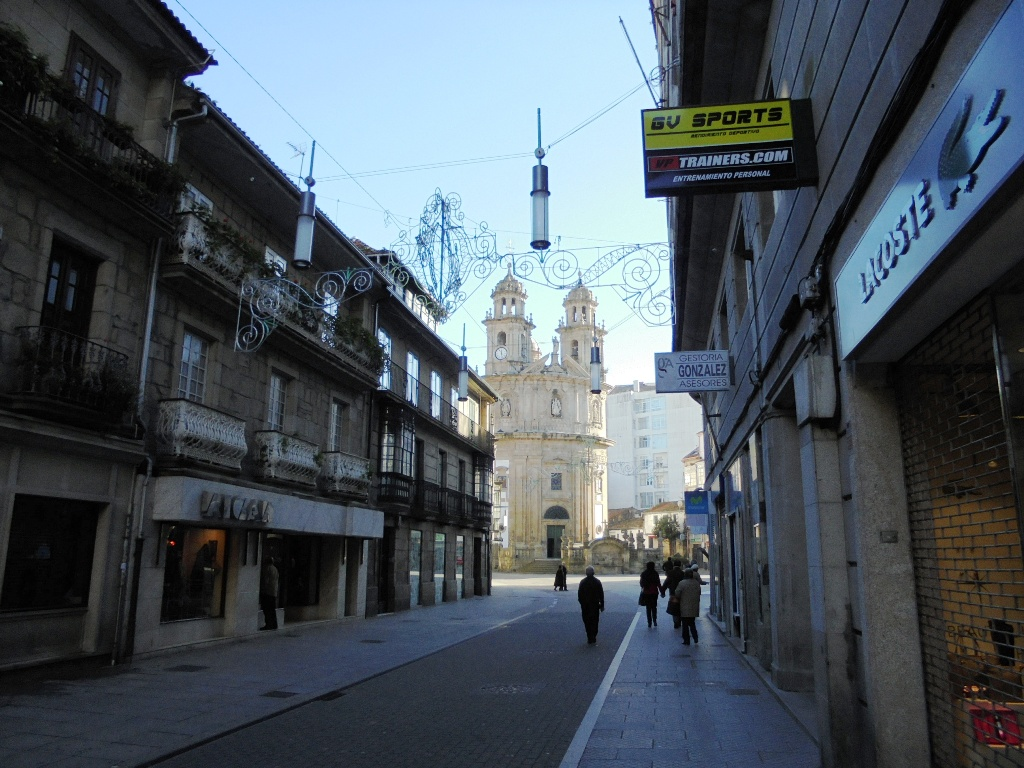
- Michelena Street near Peregrina Square
- Native name: Calle Michelena (Spanish)
- Type: Street
- Maintained by: Pontevedra City Council
- Location: Pontevedra, Spain
- Postal code: 36002
- Coordinates: 42.431583°N 8.646333°W

The Calle Michelena is a street in Pontevedra (Spain) located in the city centre, on the edge of the old town. It is one of the main streets of Pontevedra and one of the most commercial streets of the city.

== Origin of the name ==
Since 1858, the street has been dedicated to José María de Michelena, who was appointed Civil Governor of Pontevedra and President of the Provincial Council of Pontevedra on 11 November 1851 and who left his post on 6 May 1853. His great initiatives and activity, as well as his excellent conditions as governor, earned him a street in the city. He was responsible for the design of the access to the Church of St. Francis with its iron balustrade and flowerbed in the square in front of the church.

== History ==
The present Michelena Street was a narrow path outside the perimeter of the walls of Pontevedra, with a beaten earth floor where water accumulated, known as Poza das Rans.

In 1852, the walls of Pontevedra began to be demolished through the Trabancas gate, between the present-day Herrería and Peregrina squares, which allowed the opening in 1854 of this street that followed the perimeter of the demolished walls in its southern part. Part of the building land was made available to the inhabitants of the city.

In 1858, the municipality of Pontevedra decided to give the street the name of José María de Michelena.

In 1864, work was completed on the street, giving it a similar appearance to the one it has today. Shops such as the Hermanos Guiard photographers' shop were set up in the street from 1867 onwards. In the 1860s, the lawyer, politician and businessman Francisco Antonio Riestra Vallaure bought several plots of land in the street, where he had fourteen buildings constructed, including the mansion at number 30. In 1872, Michelena Street was one of the first in the city to have pavements.

On 25 July 1888, Michelena Street became the first street in Galicia (along with the neighbouring Oliva Street) to have public lighting, thanks to the installation of electric arcs and incandescent lamps. This first Galician electricity network was the work of the Marquis of Riestra, who built the first electricity factory in the northwest of the Iberian Peninsula in the Plaza de la Verdura and who in 1887 obtained a patent for a process of adjusting the dynamos.

At the beginning of the 20th century, Michelena Street was already one of the most important streets in the city. On 1 November 1900, construction work began on the new Bank of Spain building at number 28. The building was designed by the architect José Fermín de Astiz Bárcena and was opened in 1903.

In 1913, the Ravachol parrot, which had been living since 1891 in Don Perfecto Feijoo's pharmacy, in a house that no longer exists at the eastern end of the street, at the corner of the Peregrina square, died.

From the end of 1924 to 1943, the street became one of the main locations for the city's electric tramway, which was later replaced by the trolleybus service and car traffic.

On 9 March 1981, the emblematic Michelena bookshop opened its doors at number 22, a reference point in Galicia for its extensive collection of up to 70,000 volumes. It closed its doors on 30 June 2010 due to the economic crisis that hit Spain between 2008 and 2014.

In 1985, the street was still one of the main traffic points in the city and had several lanes. In August 2001, the street was closed to car traffic and became pedestrianised.

== Description ==
It is a cobbled street that follows the line of the old medieval wall in the heart of the city centre, relatively straight and mostly flat with a length of about 250 metres. Its average width is 10 to 11 metres.

This is a central pedestrian street on the edge of the historic centre, linking the plaza de España to the plaza de la Peregrina. Three pedestrian streets converge along it, from west to east: Marquesa, General Gutiérrez Mellado and Fernández Villaverde.

Michelena Street is one of the main streets of the city and one of its nerve centres, where official institutions such as the City Hall building or the building of the provincial branches of Spain's peripheral administration, as well as numerous national and international shops and franchises, can be found.

== Outstanding buildings ==
The beginning of the street coincides with the Peregrina square and at the corner between the square and Michelena street was the building of the apothecary Perfecto Feijoo's pharmacy where the Ravachol parrot died in 1913 and where today there is a sculpture of the parrot made by the sculptor José Luis Penado in 2006.

At number 28 of the street is the Bank of Spain building. Its construction began in 1900 and it was inaugurated in 1903. It is an example of the administrative architecture of the Spanish state at the beginning of the 20th century, in an eclectic style. Its main entrance is on Michelena Street and it has a backyard with an entrance on Fernández Villaverde Street. The building's facades are symmetrical and solemn. The main door on Michelena Street ends in a semicircular arch with an upper stone balcony on corbels. The stone elements that frame and decorate the windows of the façades have geometric decoration in the upper part, which ends in segmental arches.

At number 30 of the street is the Marquis of Riestra's mansion, built at the end of the 19th century, where the Marquis of Riestra established his residence and the headquarters of his Riestra Bank. It is an eclectic building with art nouveau elements. Its façade has galleries, horseshoe arches and decorative frames. The windows and the carriage entrance on the ground floor are framed by semicircular arches. The ground floor is surrounded by a granite plinth.

The buildings at numbers 2, 4, 6, 8, 10, 10, 24, 32, 34, 36, 38, 40 and 42 date from the 19th century. Number 2 dates from 1853 and was the house of Manuel Portela Valladares. Number 4 dates from 1878 and number 24 was the house of the politician Alejandro Mon. At number 20 of the street, the restaurant-tapería La Muralla has incorporated a section of the medieval walls in the basement, which has become an additional element of the interior decoration.

== Gallery ==
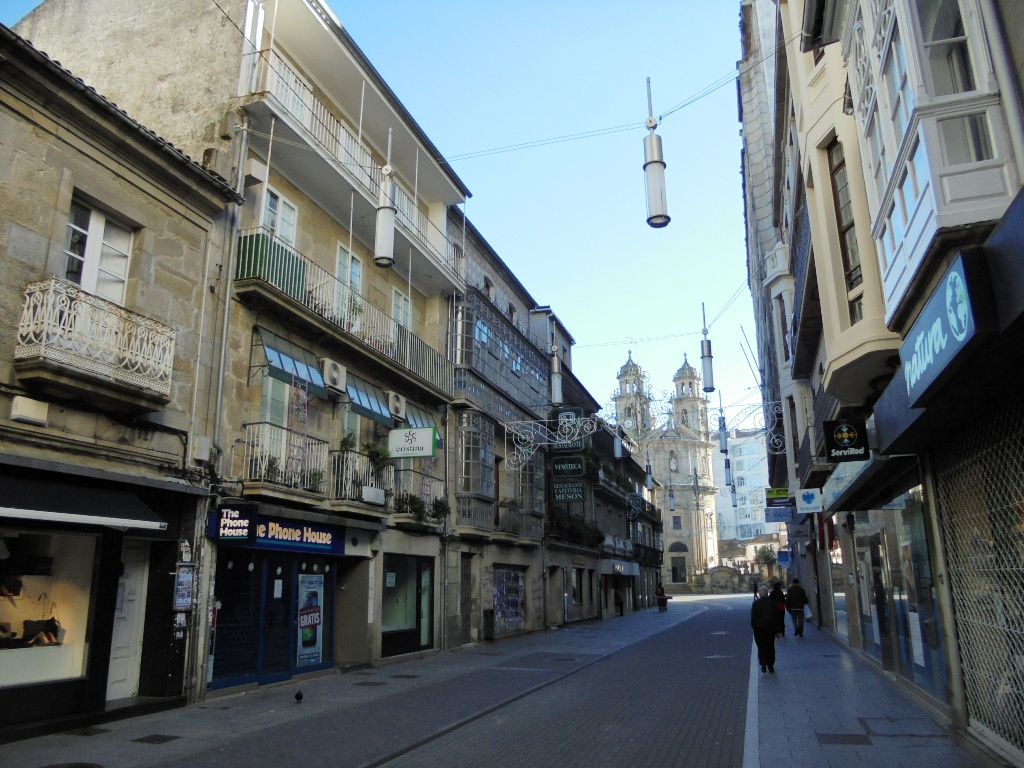
Section of the street near the Peregrina square

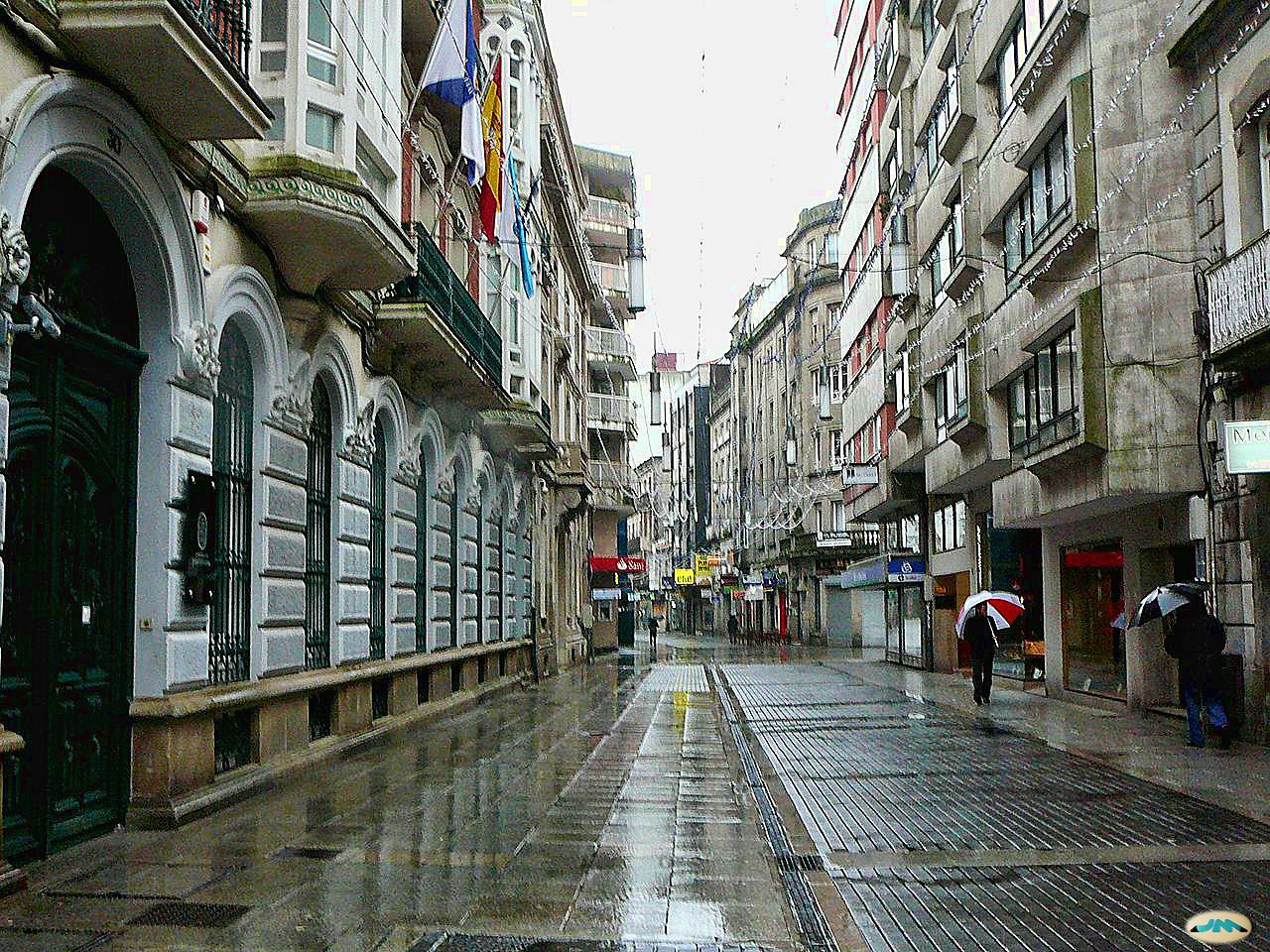
Section of the street near the Plaza de España

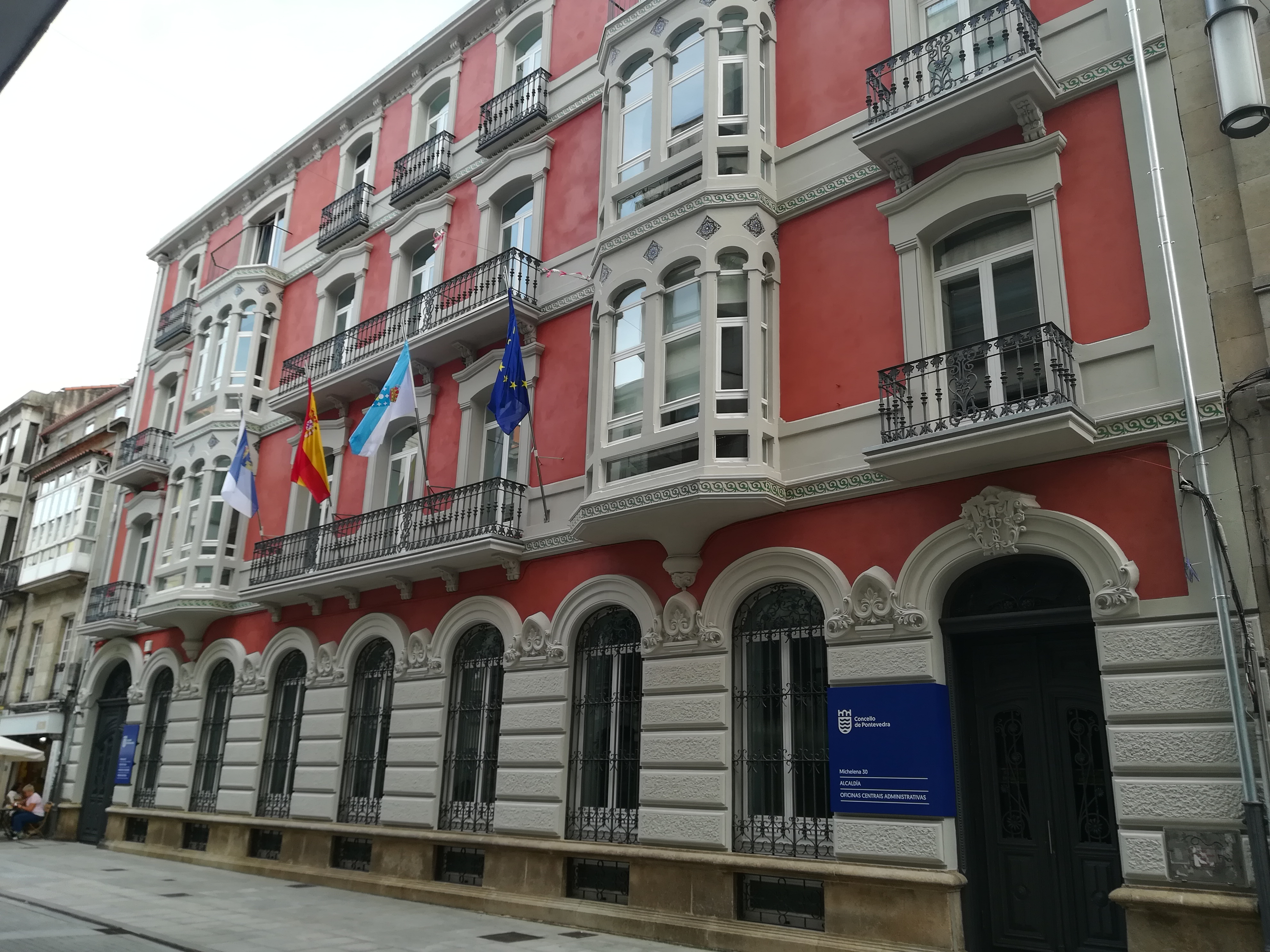
Marquis of Riestra's mansion at number 30

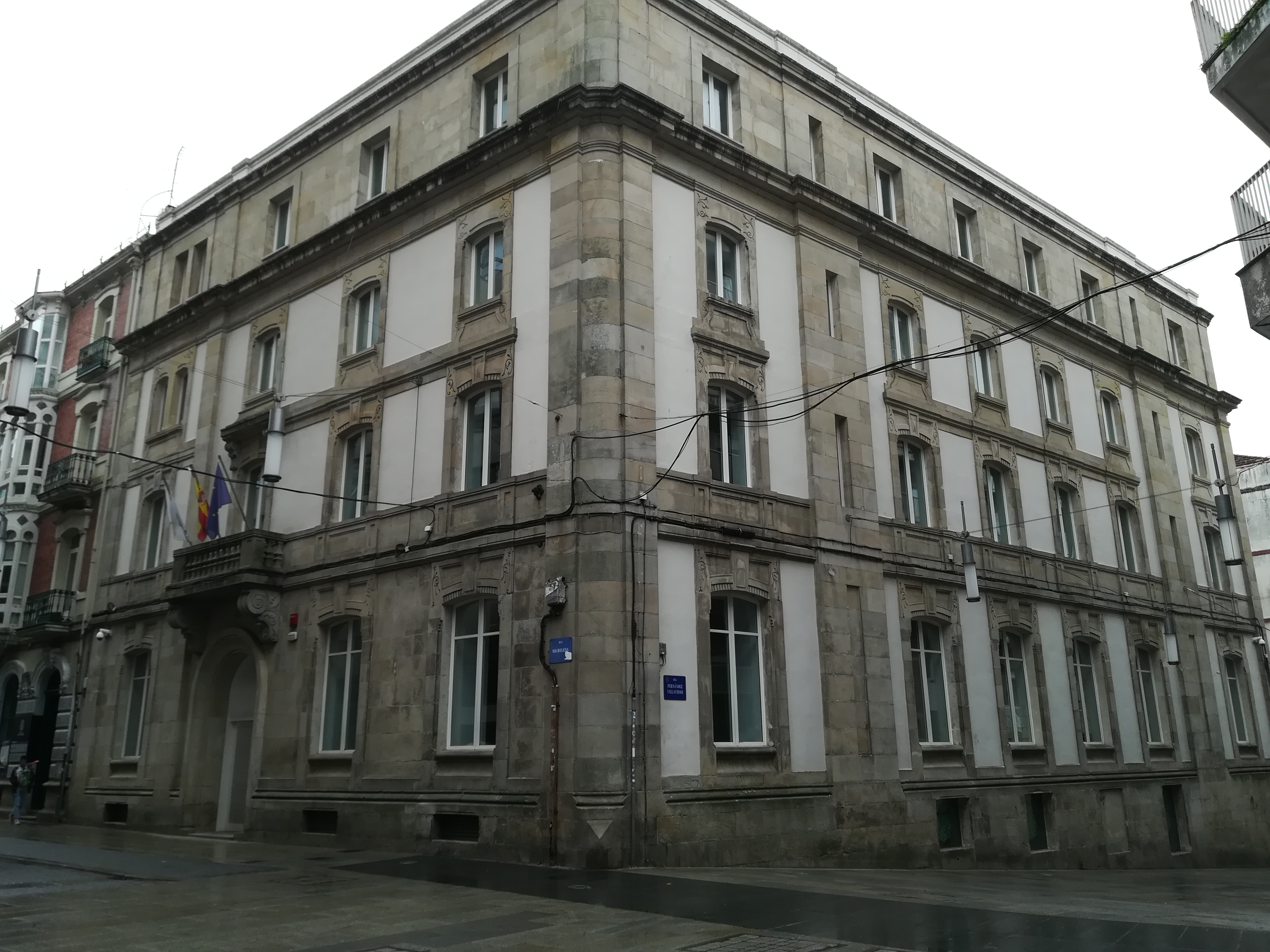
Bank of Spain building at number 28

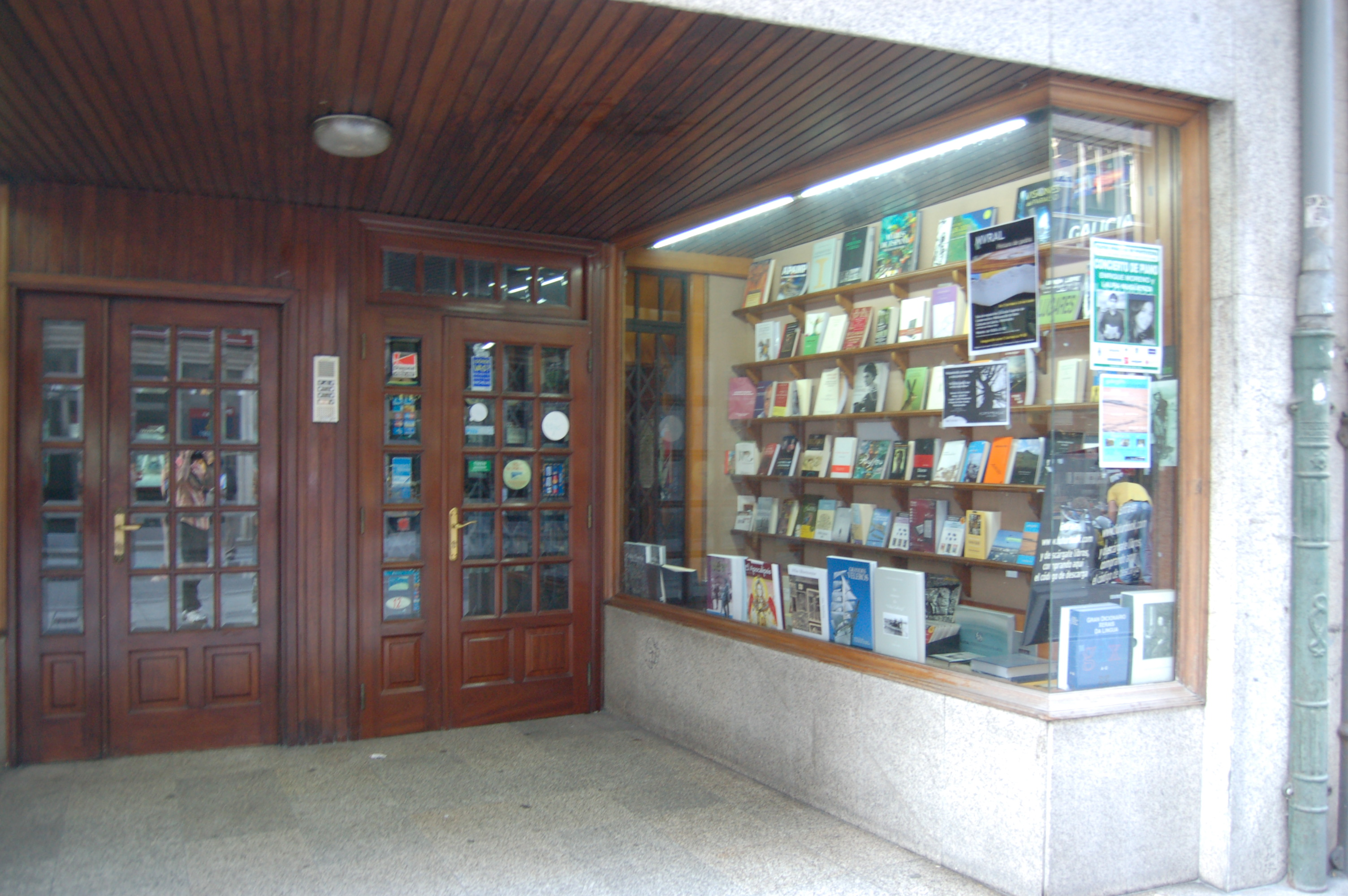
Former Michelena bookshop at number 22

== See also ==
=== Bibliography ===
- Carmona Badía, Xoán (2009). Empresarios de Galicia. Volume 2 (in Galician). A Coruña: CIEF, Centro de Investigación Económica e Financeira Fundación Caixa Galicia. pp. 255–257. ISBN 978-84-96982-37-6.
- Durán Villa, Francisco (2000). Provincia de Pontevedra (in Spanish). Madrid: Mediterráneo. p. 88. ISBN 8471563371.
- Fontoira Surís, Rafael (2009). Pontevedra monumental (in Galician). Pontevedra: Diputación de Pontevedra. pp. 427–429, 512. ISBN 9788484573272.
- "El edificio de la antigua sucursal del Banco de España en Jerez de la Frontera, obra de José de Astiz y Bárcena". Boletín de Arte 2016 (in Spanish). 37: 261–266. November 2017. ISSN 0211-8483.

=== Related articles ===
- Ensanche-City Centre
- Plaza de la Peregrina
- Plaza de España
- Mansion of the Marquis of Riestra
- Bank of the Spain Building

=== External links ===
- Michelena Street
