= Plaza de la Verdura =

Picturesque medieval square in Pontevedra, Spain

Verdura square
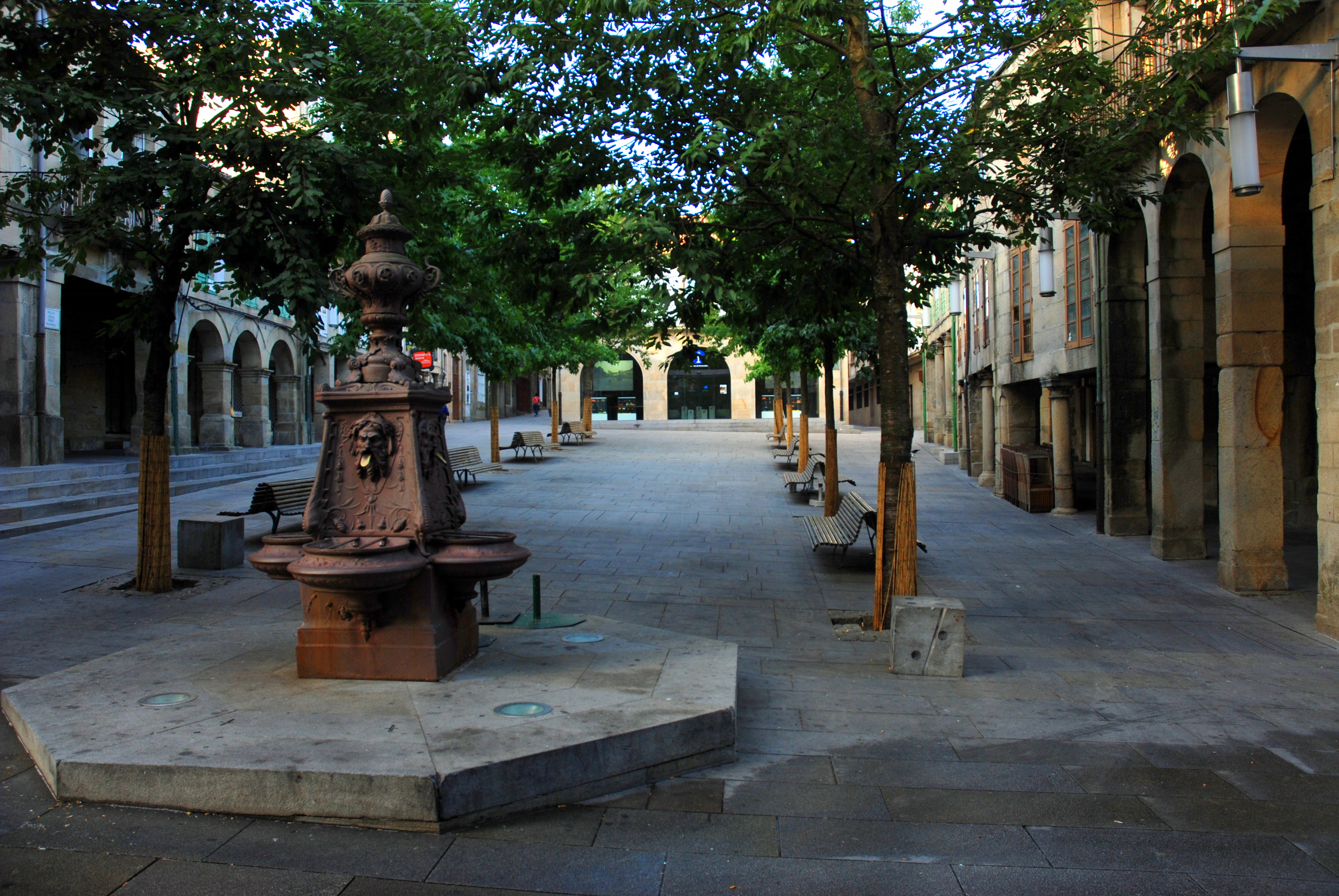
- Verdura square
- Native name: Plaza de la Verdura (Spanish)
- Type: plaza
- Maintained by: Pontevedra City Council
- Location: Pontevedra, Spain
- Postal code: 36002
- Coordinates: 42.432724°N 8.643862°W

The Plaza de la Verdura (Vegetable Square) is a square of medieval origin located in the heart of the historic centre of Pontevedra (Spain). It is one of the liveliest medieval squares in the city.

== Etymology ==
The Plaza de la Verdura owes its name to the traditional vegetable, fruit and chestnut market that was held there every morning, except on Sundays and public holidays. This market was held in the square until the 1990s and the vegetables and fruit were brought in by producers from the surrounding villages.

== History ==
The square has had a commercial function since its origins. It was built as Praza da Feira (name under which it is mentioned in 1330), i.e. as a market place, and belongs to the second extension of the walls of Pontevedra in the 14th century. It was the site of the Feira Franca, a tax-free market created by King Henry IV of Castile, but it soon became too small to accommodate it. In the 15th century, the wall was extended for the third time and another larger square was built for the Feira Franca, the present-day Plaza de la Herrería. This is how the Plaza de la Verdura came to be known as the Praza da Feira Vella (Old Market Square) in 1441. The square was also called Plaza del Pescado in the 19th century because fish was sold there and Plaza de Indalecio Armesto from 1895 to 1996.

In the 18th century, the Rastro (flea market) was located in the square. In 1887, a cast iron fountain designed in France was placed at the top of the square. In 1888, an electricity factory was built here. On 16 March 1888, the construction of the chimney of this light factory, promoted by the Marquis of Riestra, began and on 25 July 1888 it was inaugurated. Pontevedra was thus the first city in Galicia and the second in Spain to have electricity and public lighting, and the Fábrica de la Luz, located in the Plaza de la Verdura, was the first electric factory in the whole of the northwest of the Iberian Peninsula.

At the end of the 19th century, the square had no trees, but by the 1920s, the square was already planted with trees. The square was redesigned in 1974 by the State Public Heritage and underwent a thorough reform in 2001 during which its characteristic catalpa trees were cut down and its double stone benches were removed. It was reopened on 19 July 2001.

From 1997 to 2015, an antique market was held in the square.

== Description ==
The square has an irregular rectangular plan and a slight slope towards the south side. On its western and eastern sides are lined up a total of ten trees, four wild cherry trees and six liquidambars and eight double-sided wooden benches.

On the north side, next to Sarmiento street, there is a cast iron fountain from 1887, decorated with flowers and shells, four fauns with a spout in the mouth and on top a vase with handles and a lid.

The square has shops and tapas bars under its arcades. On the south side and the upper part is the Casa de la Luz, the municipal headquarters of Pontevedra Tourism.

Most of the houses in the square have arcades. The houses on the west side of the square are 14th century in origin, with arcades on the ground floor and one or two floors. The arcades have columns with Tuscan capitals. Almost all the houses were renovated in the 16th century. The last of the houses on this western side, with double-height arcades, dates from the 18th century.

All the houses on the east side were renovated in the 18th century on top of older 16th century houses, of which the pillars remain. Some of them were added to in the 20th century. One of the two houses in the square with arcades and Tuscan columns next to the pharmacy (which retains 19th century decoration) at the top of the square has an inscription dated 1716.

== Outstanding buildings ==
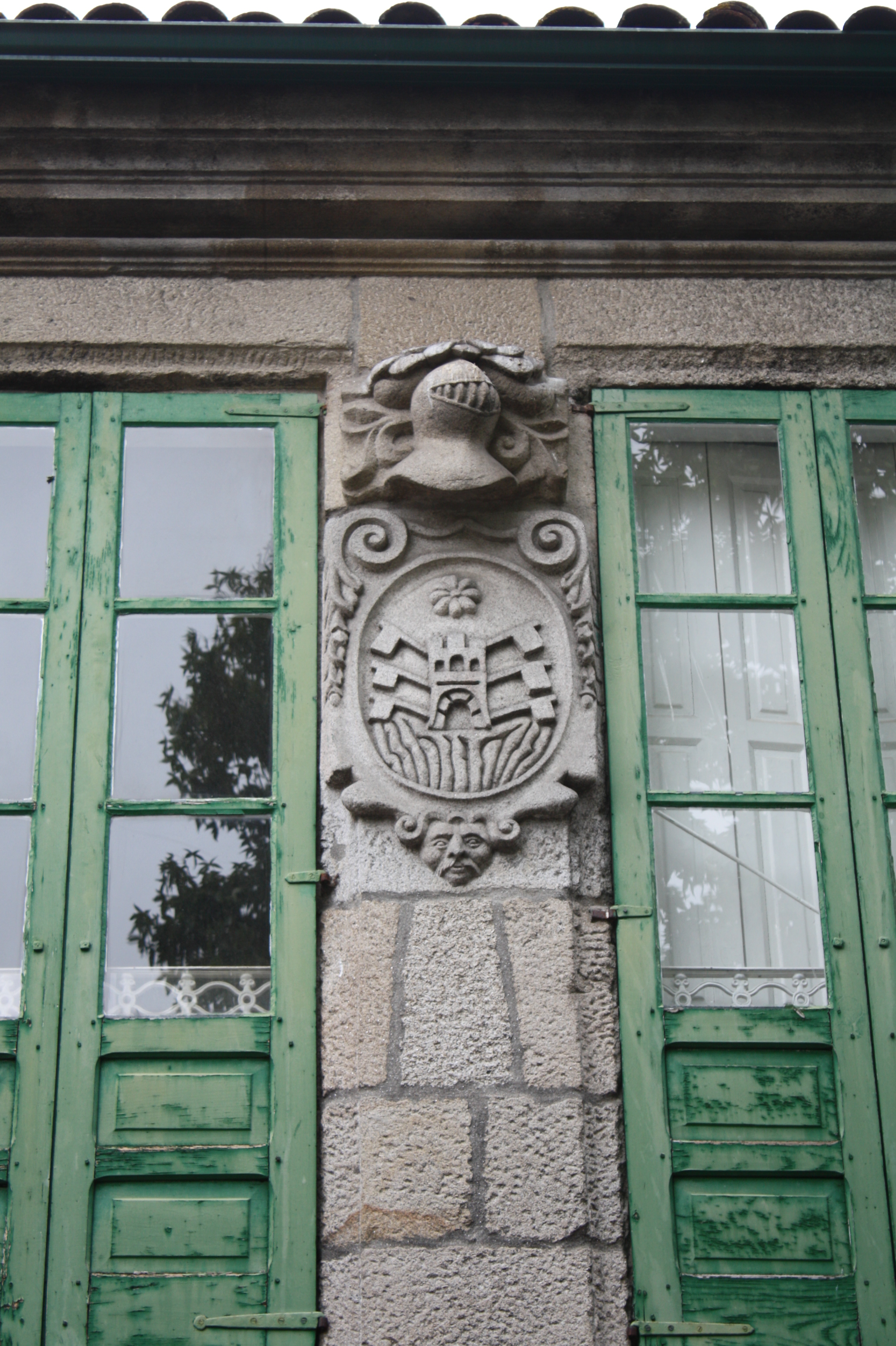
Coat of arms of the House of Juan Álvarez de Sotomayor.

Since 1595, the house that presides over the square on the south side was the town's slaughterhouse and was known as the Macelo House. In 1888 it became the Factory of Light and was extensively renovated in the 20th and 21st centuries. It is now called Casa de la Luz and since its last renovation in 2010 has been the headquarters of Pontevedra Tourism. The house has three large glass arcades on the ground floor overlooking the square and a balcony at the top with three doors.

On the west side of the square, the first house, at number 5, is that of the archdeacon of the Salnés, Juan Fernández de Sotomayor, and was later the home of the Marist Brothers. It preserves two large pointed arches on the sides of the arcades on the ground floor and a small Gothic pointed window with a small rose window on the south façade of the first floor, restored in 1975. On the façade facing the square, the house has a coat of arms between the balcony doors. After its renovation, the building is used as tourist accommodation.

At the top of the square, on the east side, is the Enrique Eiras Puig pharmacy, dating from 1872. On its ceiling is an imposing painting of a half-naked woman accompanied by a group of angels and floral motifs, which reads Ars cum natura ad salutem conspirans (Art working with nature for health).

== The square in popular culture ==
A scene from the Spanish television series Los gozos y las sombras, starring Eusebio Poncela, was shot in the Eiras Puig pharmacy.

On the west side of the square, on the ground floor of the house of Juan Fernández de Sotomayor, is the tapas bar Os Maristas, reopened in July 2021.

== Gallery ==
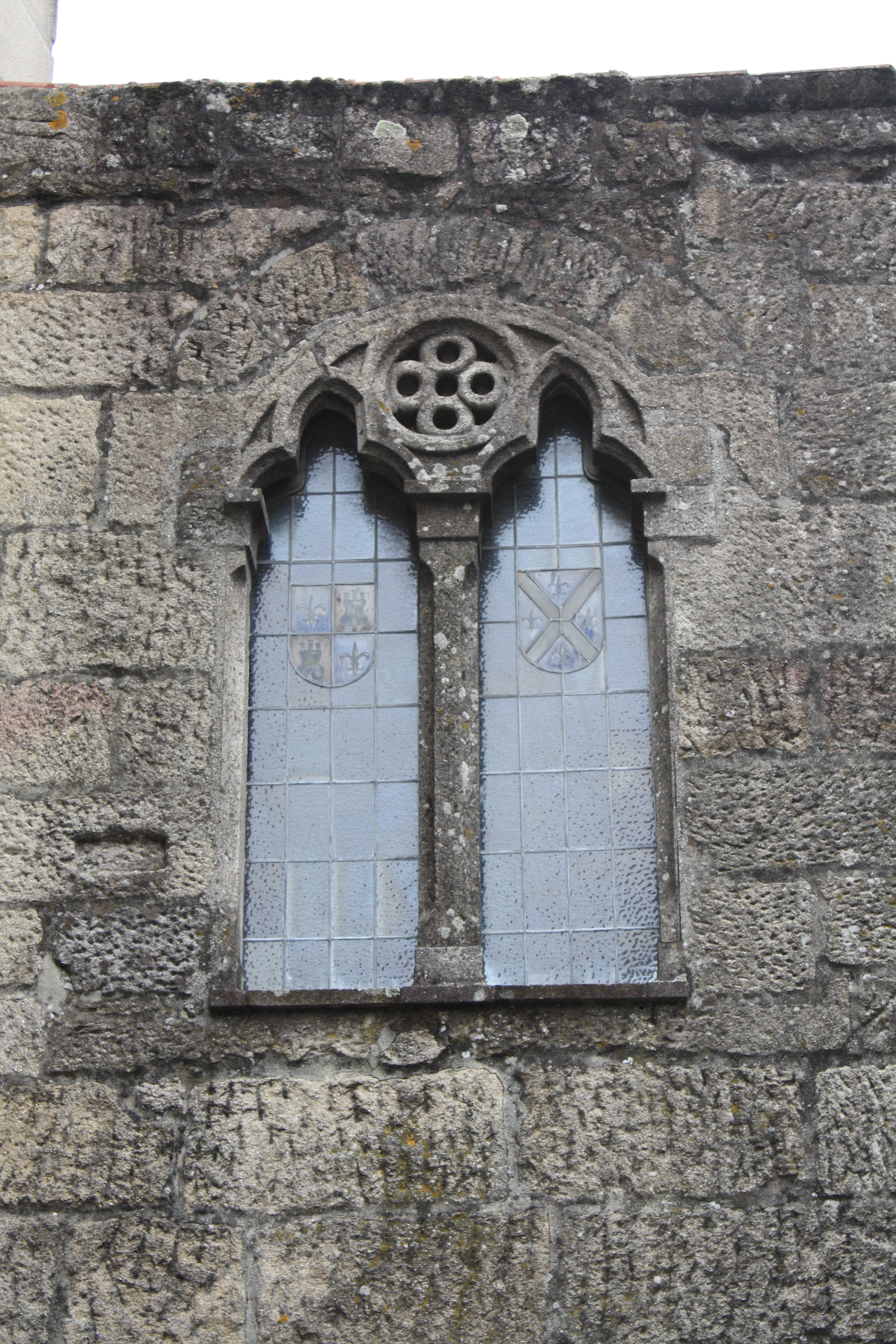
Gothic arched window of the House of Juan Álvarez de Sotomayor.

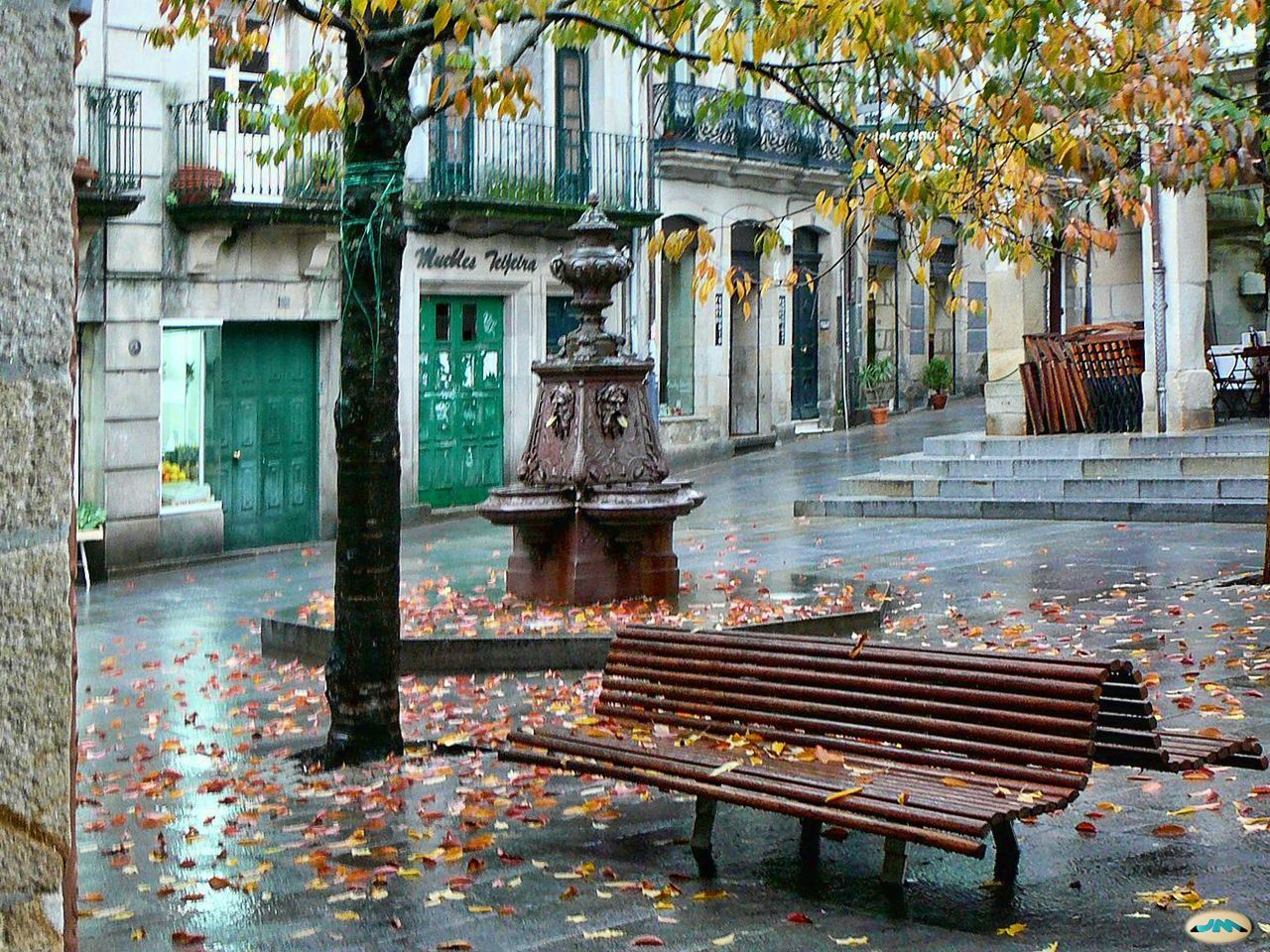
Benches in the square.

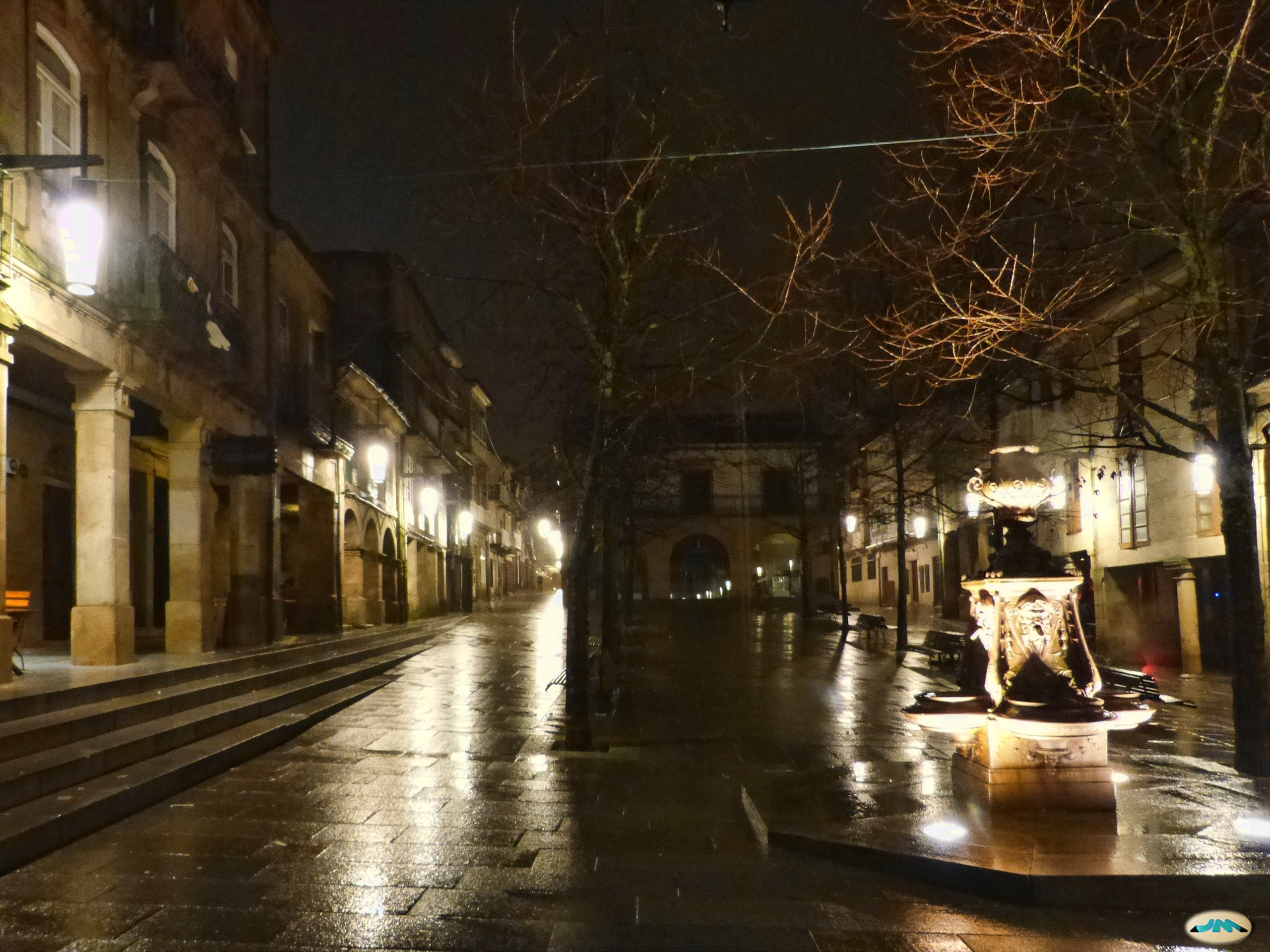
The square at night.

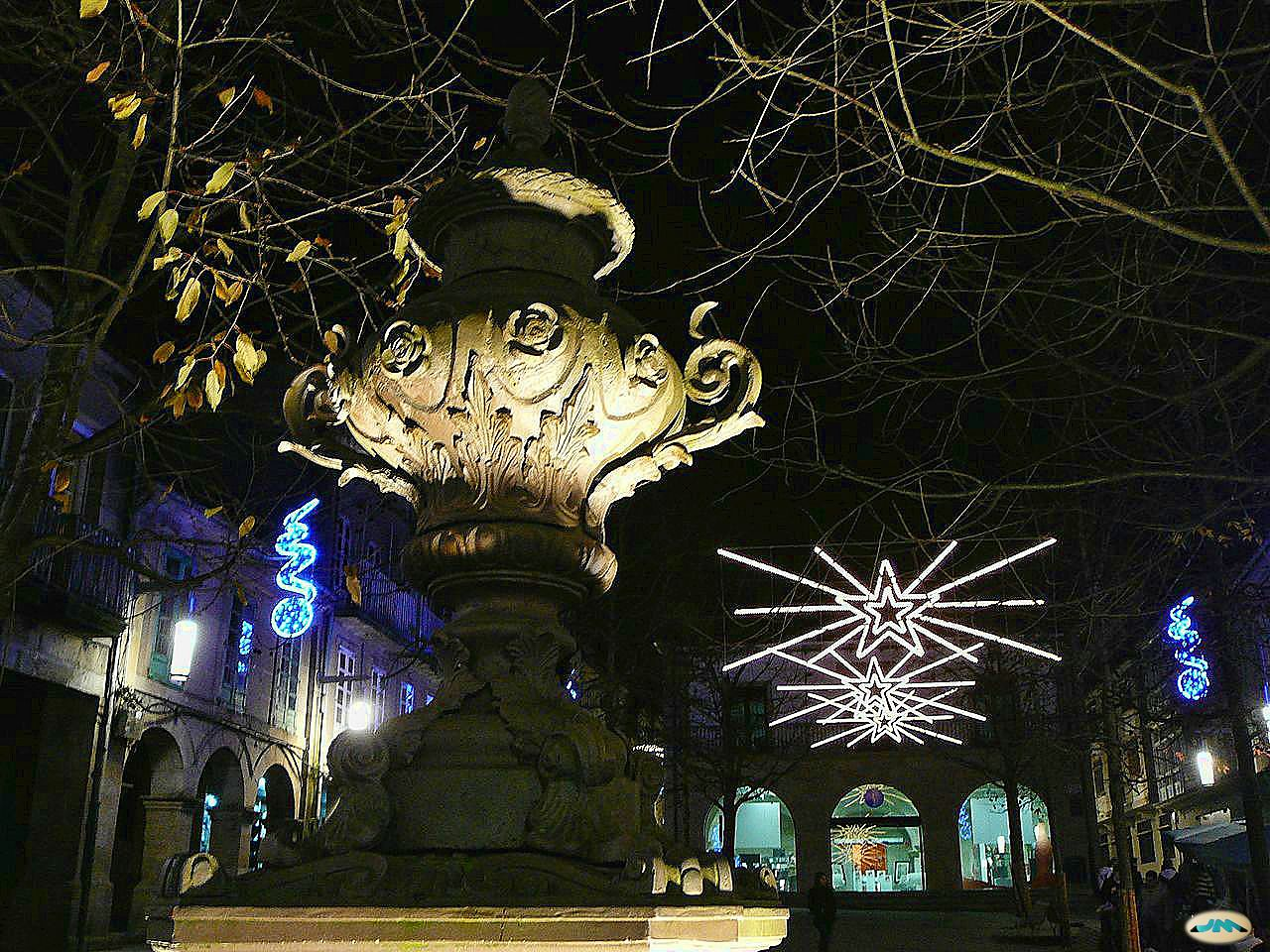
The square at Christmas.

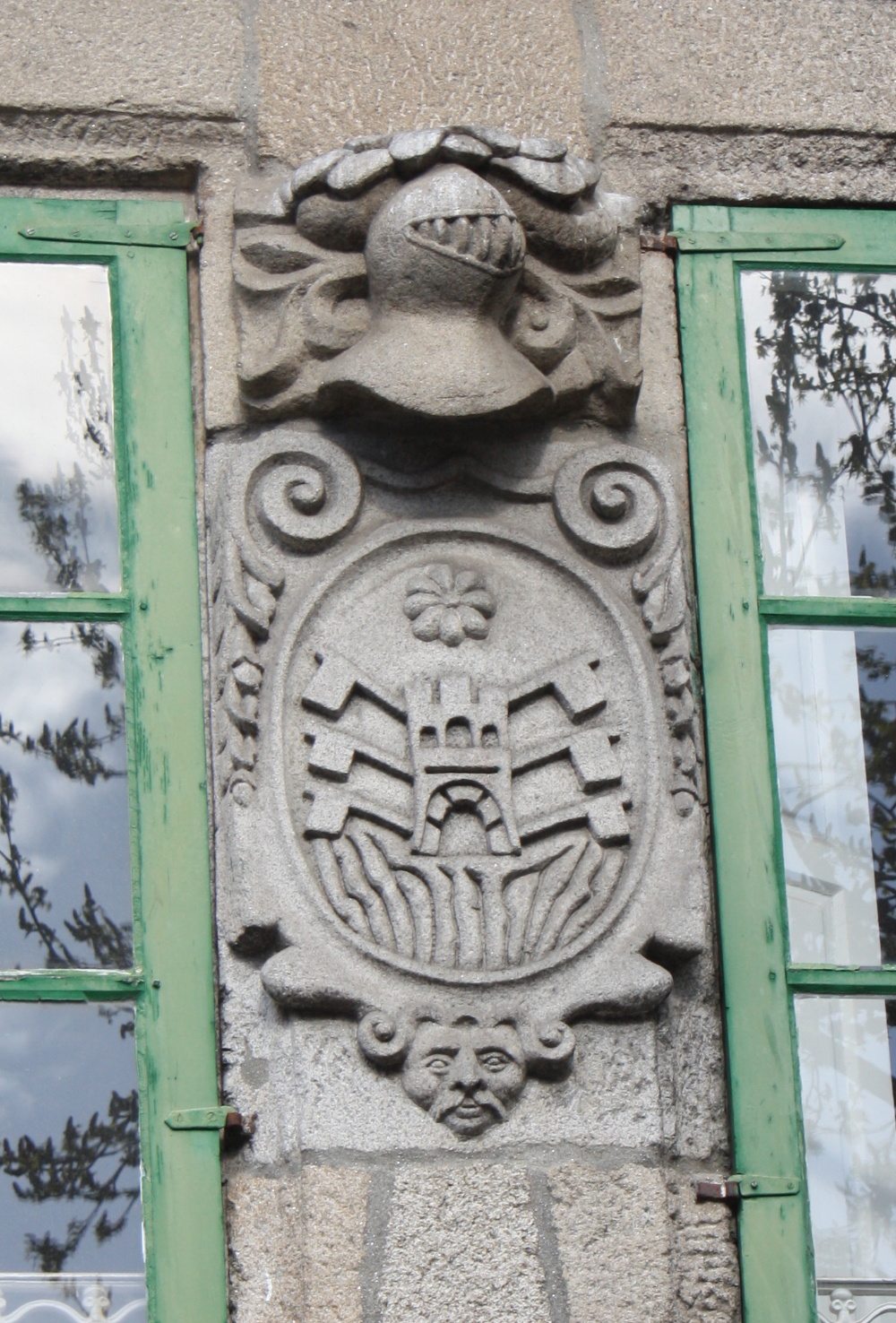
Coat of arms of the House of Juan Álvarez de Sotomayor.

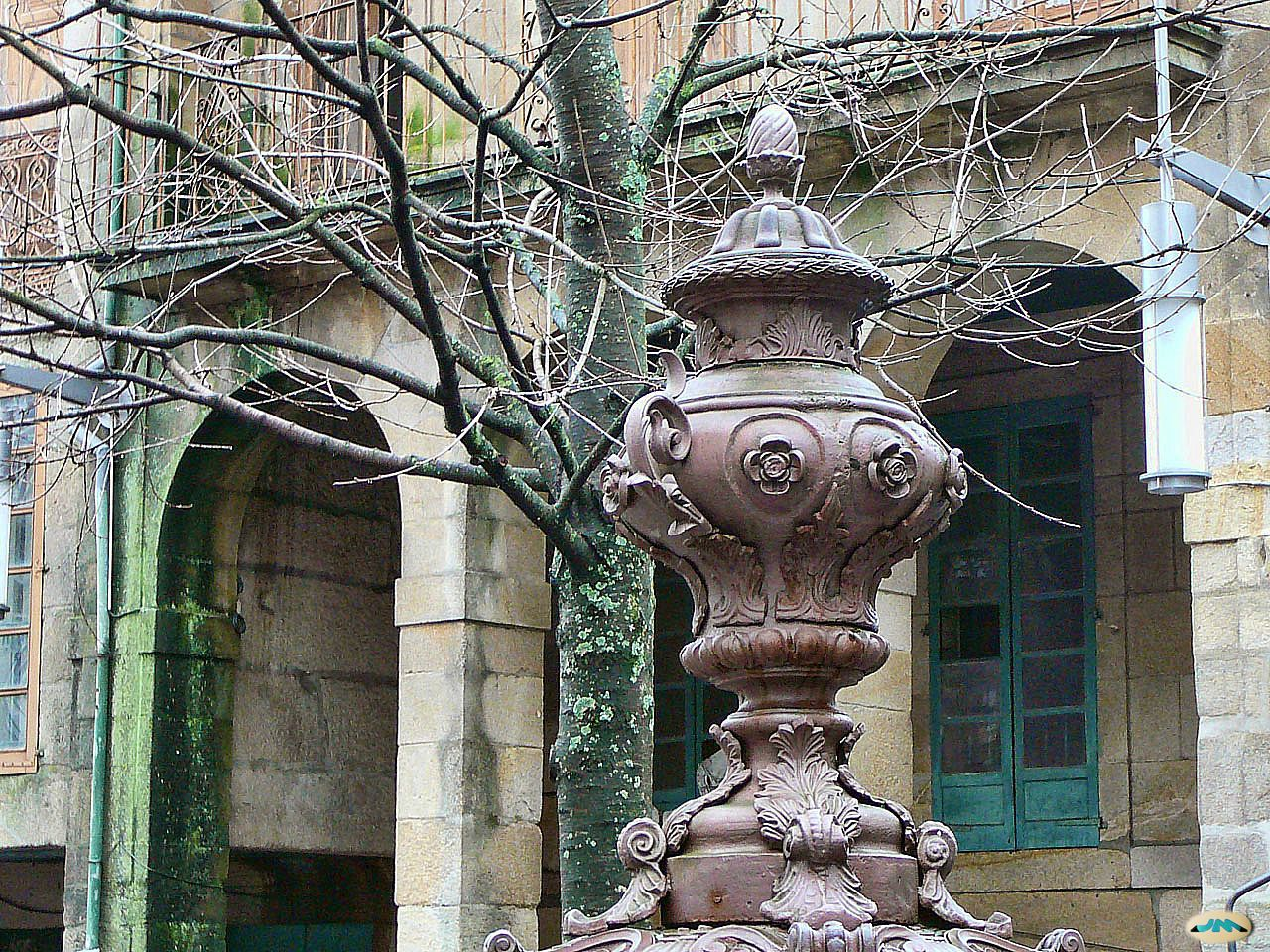
Top of the cast iron fountain.

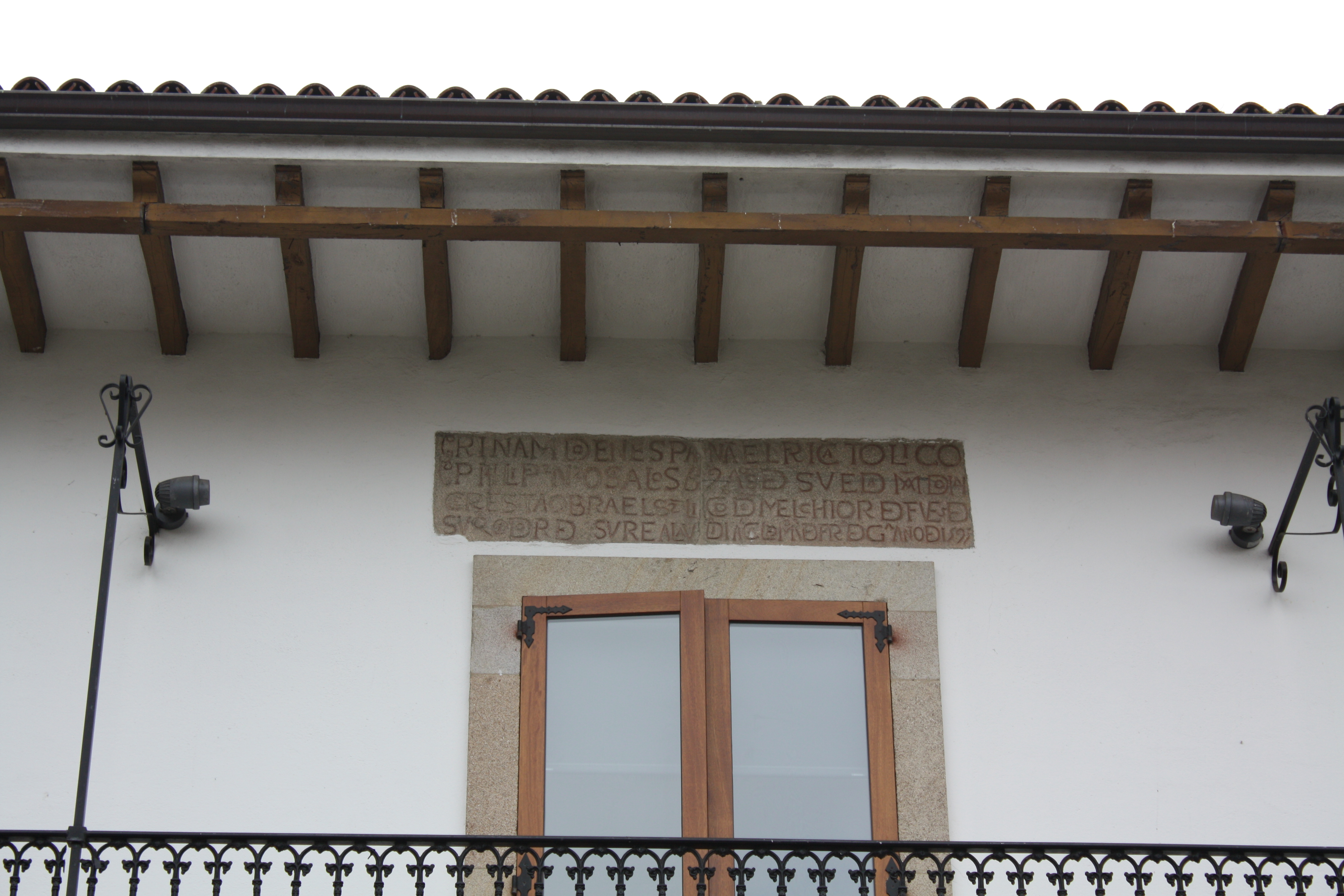
Inscription on the façade of the House of Light

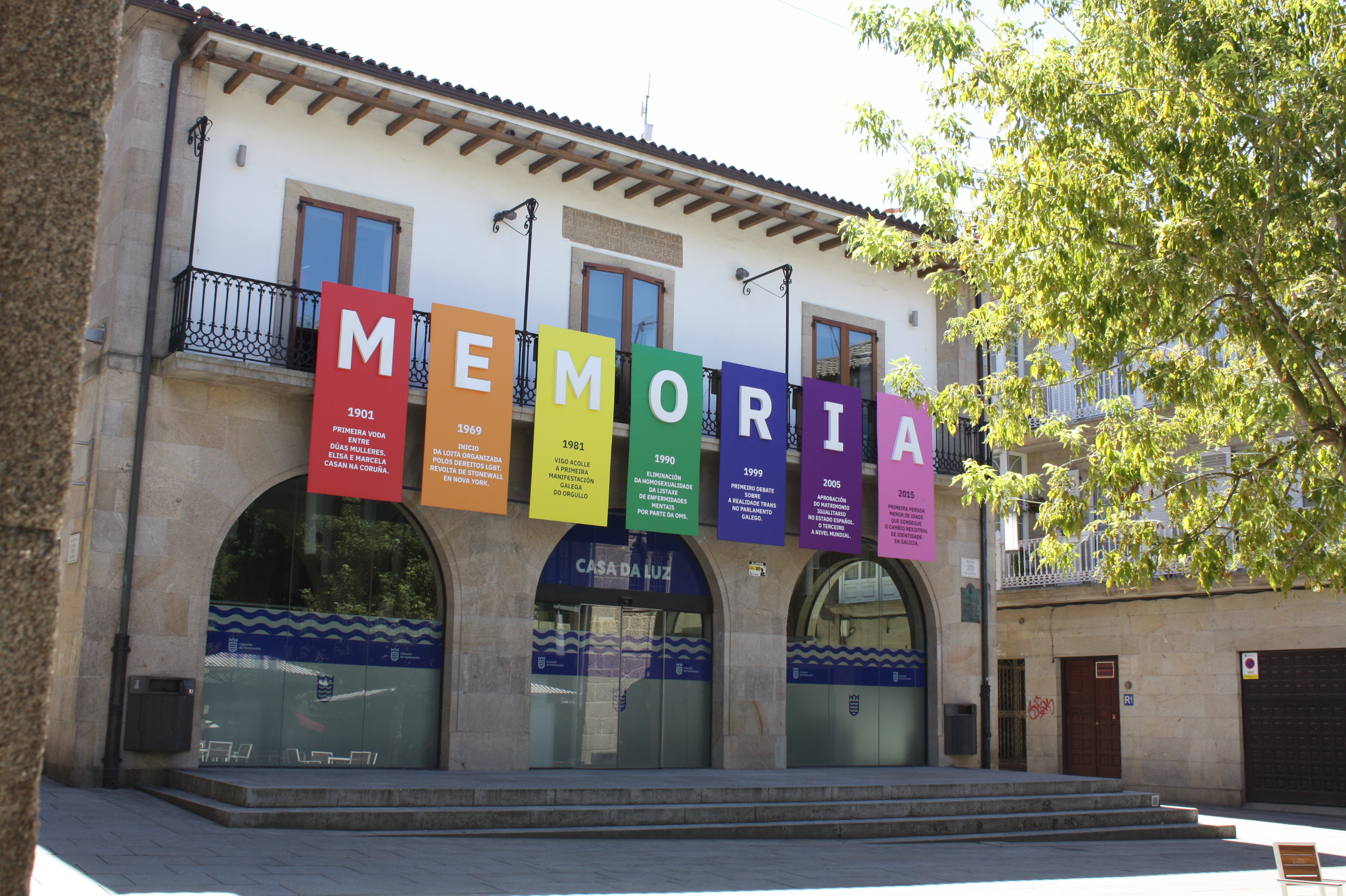
Casa de la Luz

== Bibliography ==
- Aganzo, Carlos (2010): Pontevedra. Ciudades con encanto. El País Aguilar. ISBN 8403509340. p. 66-67.
- Fernández Martínez, Carla (2016). Pontevedra. La memoria rescatada: Vistas y visiones de una ciudad atlántica. Diputación de Pontevedra. ISBN 8484574407.
- Fontoira Surís, Rafael (2009): Pontevedra monumental. Diputación de Pontevedra. ISBN 8484573273.
- Juega Puig, J. (2000): As ruas de Pontevedra. Deputación Provincial de Pontevedra, Servizo de Publicacións, Pontevedra
- Nieto González, Remigio (1980) : Guía monumental ilustrada de Pontevedra. Asociación de Comerciantes de la Calle Manuel Quiroga, Pontevedra.
- Riveiro Tobío, Elvira (2008): Descubrir Pontevedra. Edicións do Cumio, Pontevedra. p. 40-41. ISBN 8482890859

== See also ==
=== Related articles ===
- Old town of Pontevedra
- Sarmiento Street

=== External links ===
- on the website Turismo de la Xunta de Galicia
- on the website Turismo Rias Baixas
- Casa de la Luz on the website Terras de Pontevedra.
- on the website Visit Pontevedra.
