= Bank of Spain Building (Pontevedra) =

Eclectic Building in Pontevedra, Spain

Bank of Spain Building in Pontevedra
- Edificio del Banco de España en Pontevedra
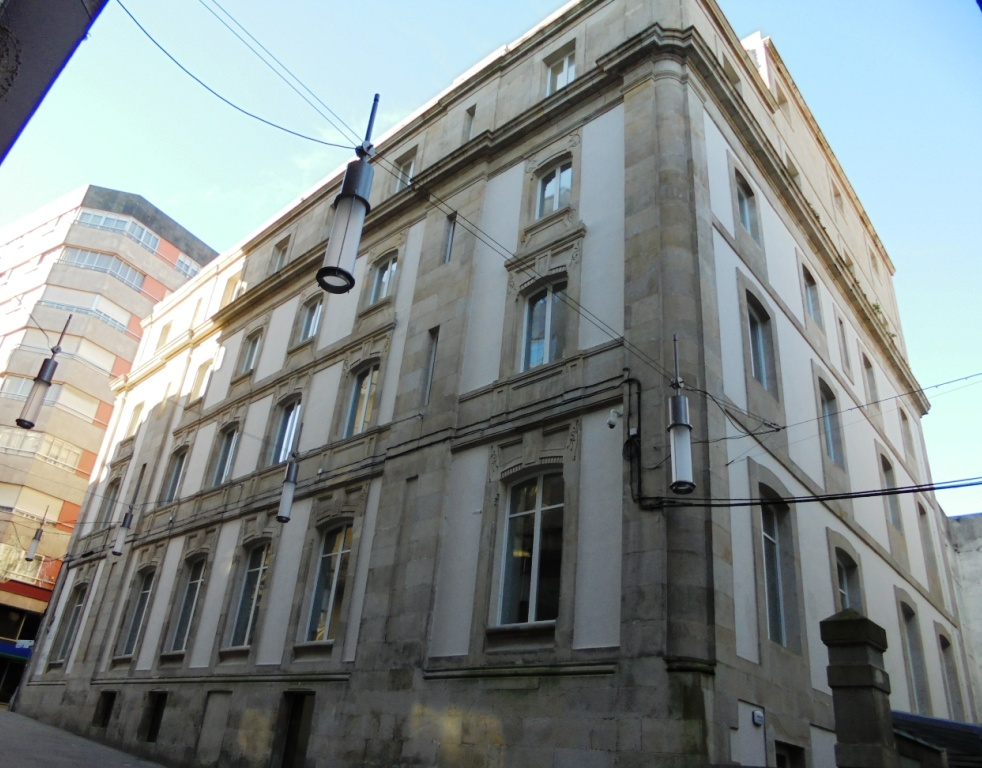
- Façade of the former Bank of Spain in Fernández Villaverde street
- Interactive map of the Bank of Spain Building in Pontevedra area

General information
- Type: Government building
- Location: Pontevedra, Galicia, Spain
- Coordinates: 42°25′53.0″N 8°38′45.0″W
- Construction started: 1900
- Completed: 1903
- Opening: 1903
- Owner: Spain government
- Management: Spain government

Technical details
- Floor count: 4

Design and construction
- Architect: José Fermín de Astiz Bárcena

The Bank of Spain building is an eclectic early-20th-century building in the Spanish city of Pontevedra.

It is the former branch of the headquarters of this entity in the city, which was closed in 2004 and currently houses the provincial offices of the peripheral state administration in Pontevedra.

== Location ==
The Banco de España building in Pontevedra is located at 28 Michelena Street, in the centre of Pontevedra, on the edge of the old town.

== History ==
The Bank of Spain had in the 19th century a branch in the city of Pontevedra, located since 1886 in the central house on the west side of Teucro Square, at number 8. Construction work on the new Bank of Spain building in the city began on 1 November 1900.

The licence was requested for use as a branch of the Bank of Spain in 1901. The architect who designed the building was José Fermín de Astiz Bárcena, who became the architect of the Bank of Spain in 1899 and who designed other branches in other Spanish capitals such as Logroño, Valencia, Badajoz, Oviedo, A Coruña and Santander. The Bank of Spain building in Pontevedra was inaugurated in 1903.

Between 1945 and 1949, the building underwent a major renovation according to the architectural project of Romualdo de Madariaga y Céspedes. It was the origin of its new structure built in reinforced concrete both in pillars and beams and with concrete joist floor slabs. The building incorporated several additions of attics and over attics. The new offices were inaugurated on 2 April 1949. Only the ground floor was used for the bank's offices, where the operations yard and the semi-basement, with the vault, were located. The rest of the floors were used as living quarters for the bank's staff.

The Bank of Spain closed its headquarters in the city, as it has done in many other Spanish provincial capitals, on 31 December 2004.

In June 2010, the Spanish government undertook a complete renovation of the building, to install different provincial offices of the state administration: foreigners (ground floor), agriculture and fisheries (first floor), coasts (second and third floor) and telecommunications (attic). The over attic was demolished and the roof of the attic was landscaped.

These services were joined at the rear, with an entrance through the courtyard, by the identity card issuing office of the Spanish National Police Corps of the Ministry of Interior on 16 May 2016. More than 100 government employees work in this building.

== Description ==
The building has an area of 2859 square metres, divided into a basement, ground floor, three floors and attic. It also has a garden with trees and a glass pergola. The interior of the building is structured around a central courtyard with a glass skylight that provides diaphanousness and spatial continuity on each floor.

It is an example of the administrative architecture of the Spanish State from the beginning of the 20th century, in an eclectic style. It has its main entrance on Michelena Street and a backyard with an entrance on Fernández Villaverde Street.

The building has great symmetry and solemnity in its facades. The main doorway ends in a semi-circular arch with an upper stone balcony on corbels. Flags of Spain, Galicia and the European Union fly on the balcony of the building. The stone elements that frame and decorate the windows on the façades have geometric decoration at the top, which ends in segmental arches.

== Gallery ==
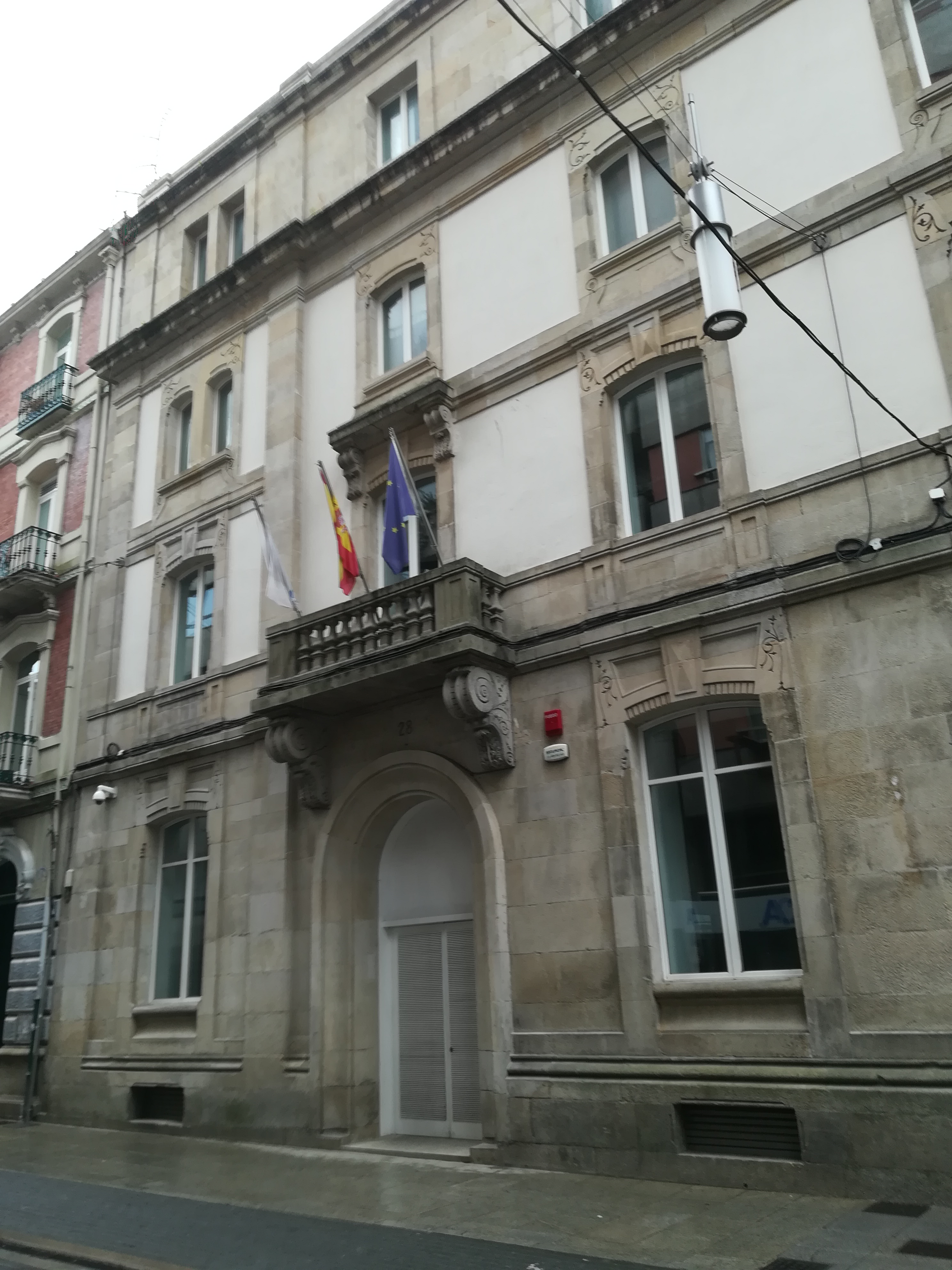
Main facade

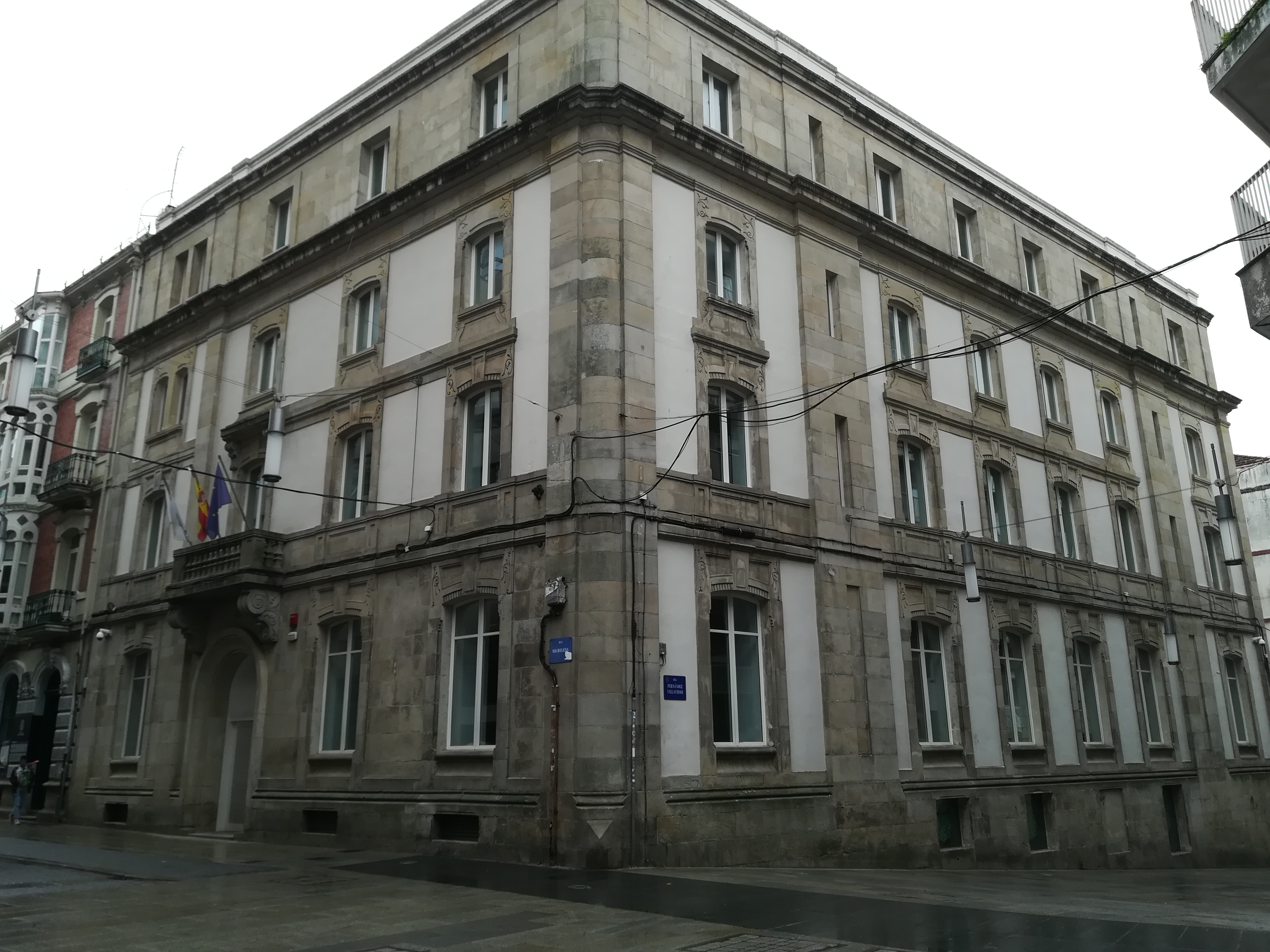
Facades

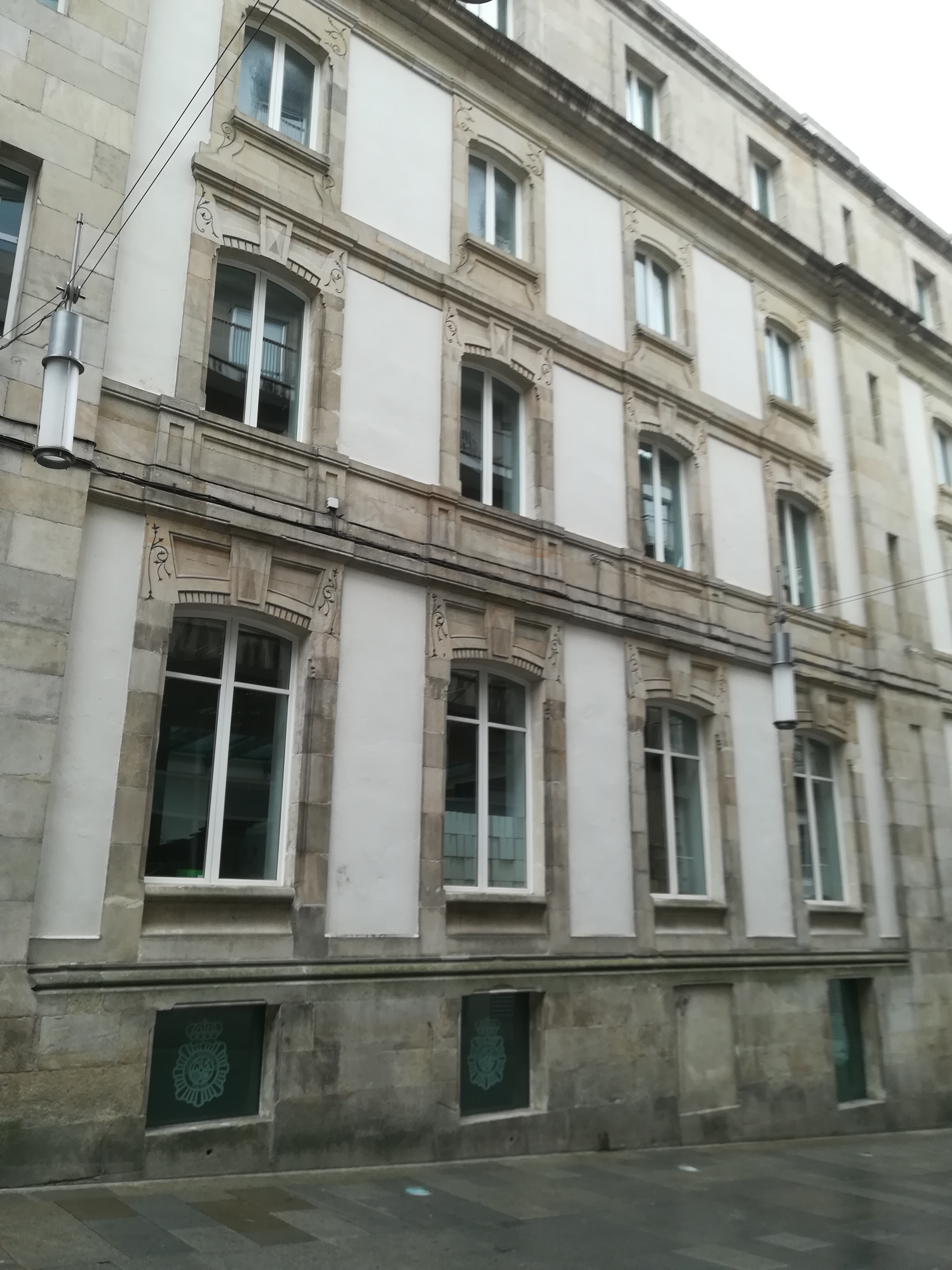
Detail of the side façade

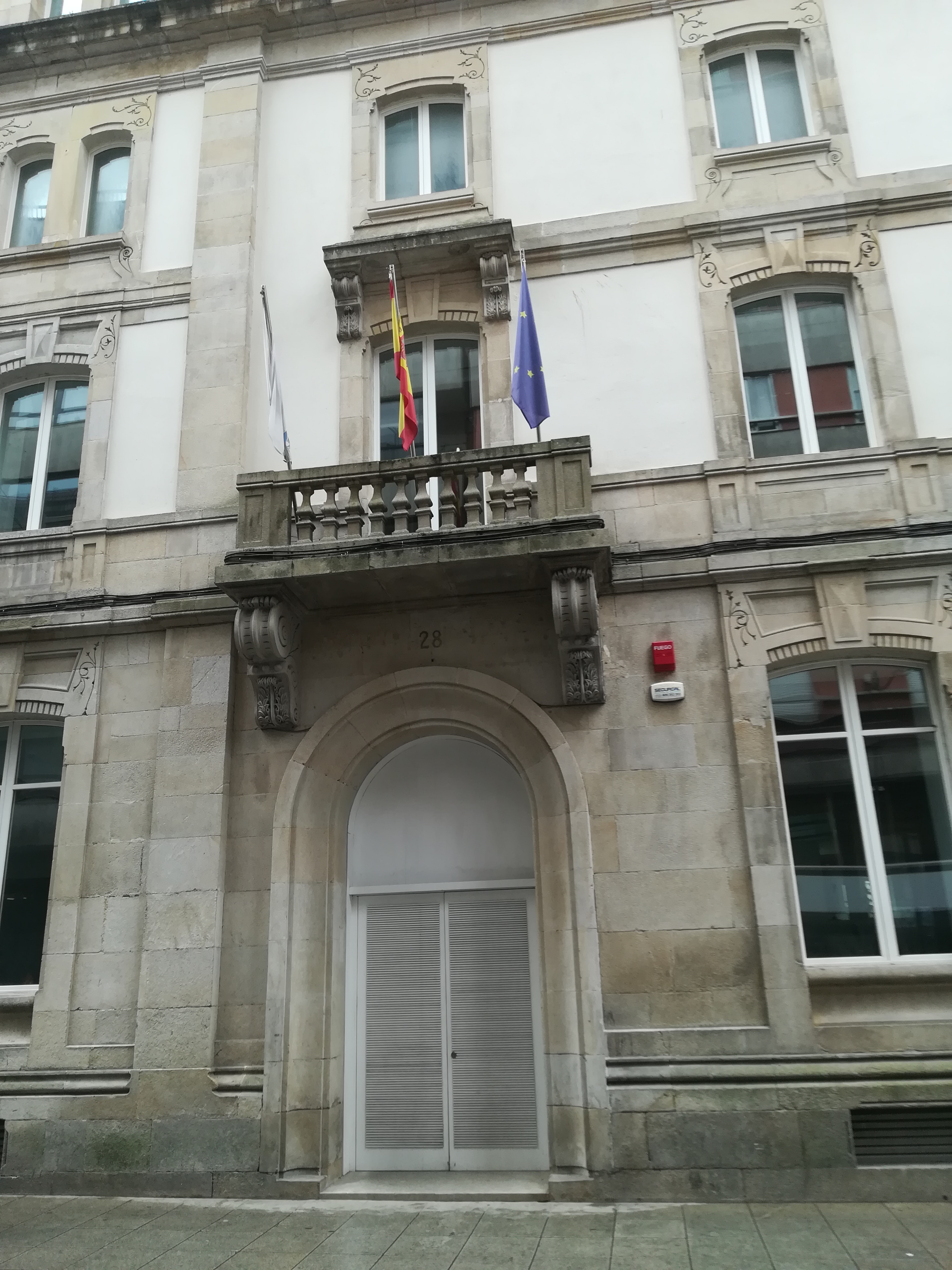
Entrance

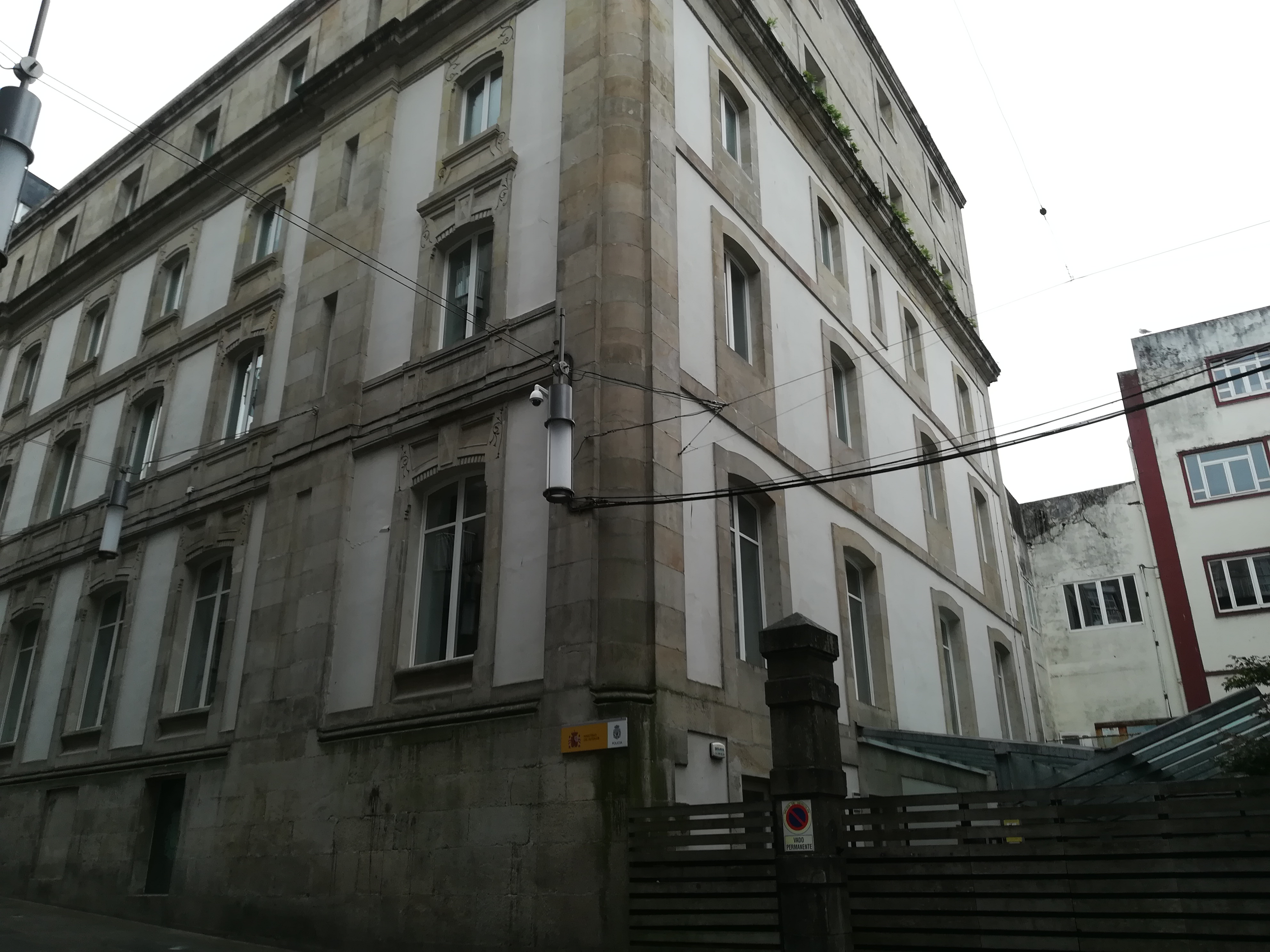
Rear facade

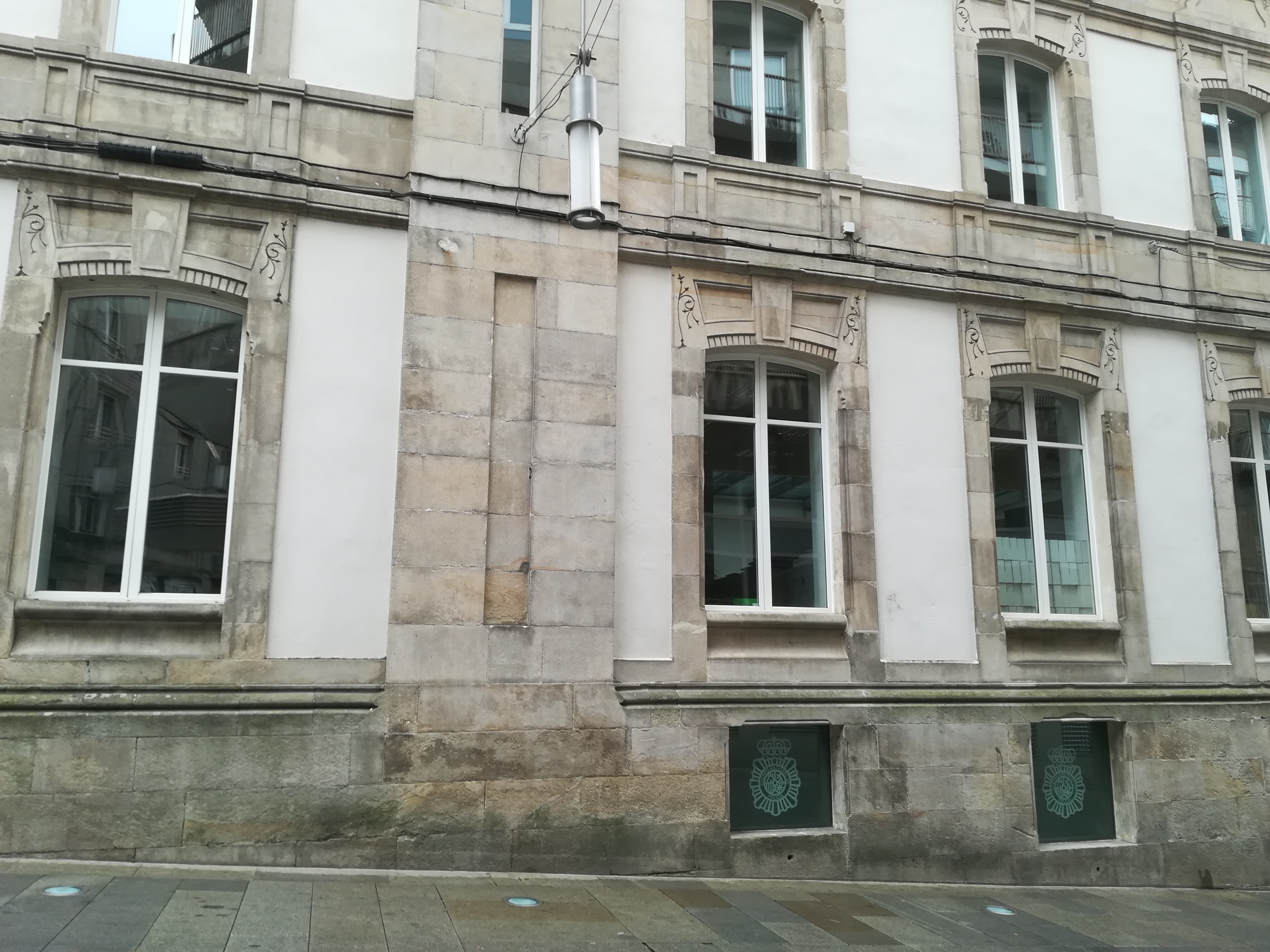
Eclectic decoration

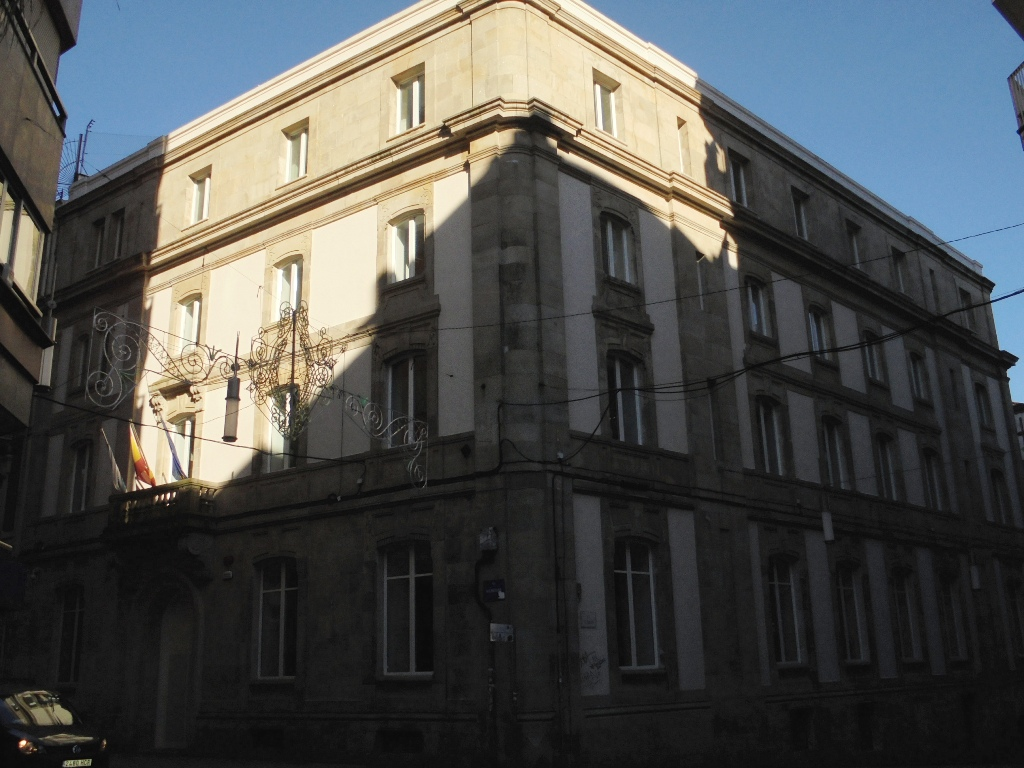
Facades

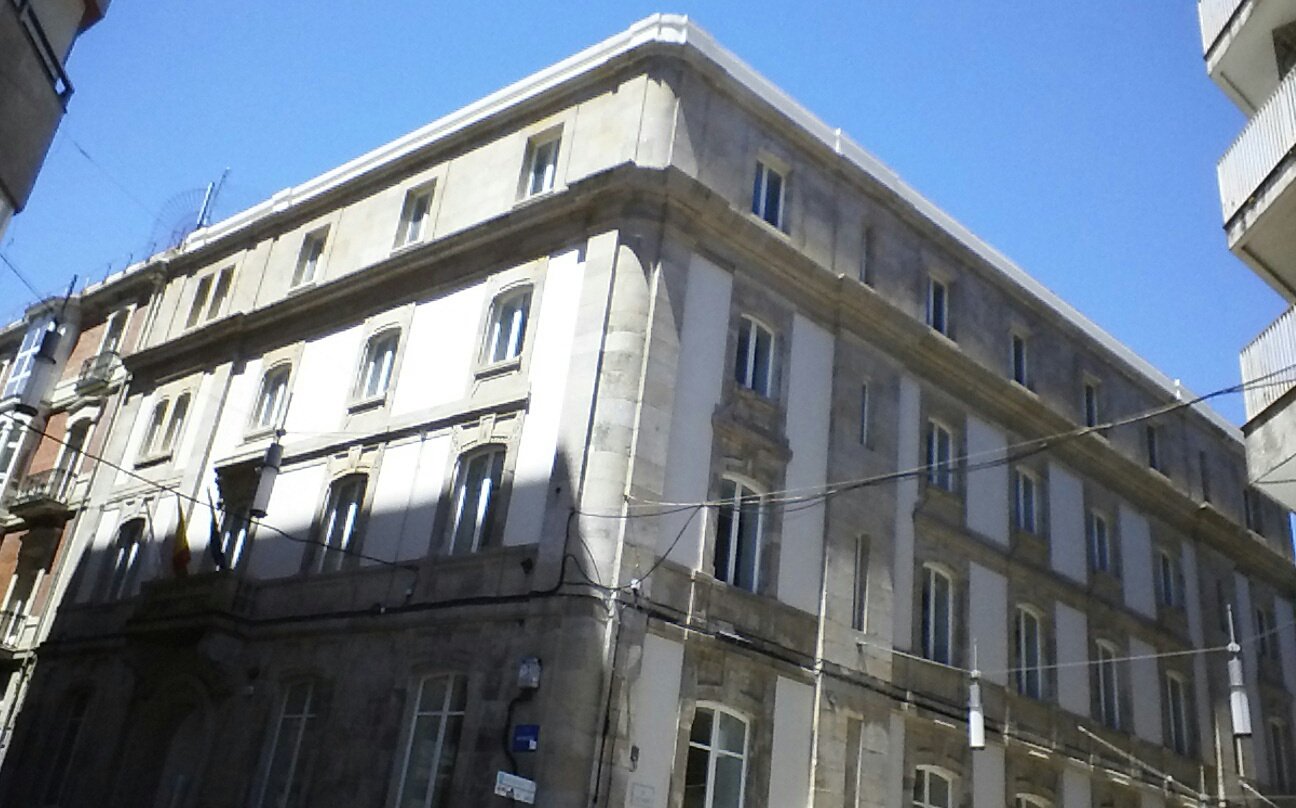
Façade and floors

== See also ==
=== Bibliography ===
- Fontoira Surís, Rafael (2009). Pontevedra monumental (in Spanish). Pontevedra: Diputación Provincial de Pontevedra. pp. 428–429. ISBN 978-84-8457-327-2.
- Moreno Arana, José Manuel (2017). "Boletín de Arte nº37 2016". Boletín de Arte (in Spanish). Málaga: Universidad de Málaga: 261–266. ISSN 0211-8483.

=== Related articles ===
- Michelena Street
- Faculty of Fine Arts of Pontevedra
- Valle-Inclán High School
- Pontevedra Central Post Office
- Pontevedra Normal School Building

=== External links ===
- Photos of the interior of the former Bank of Spain
- El edificio de la antigua sucursal del Banco de España en Jerez de la Frontera
