= Mansion of the Marquis of Riestra =

Eclectic building in Pontevedra, Spain

- Casa del Marqués de Riestra
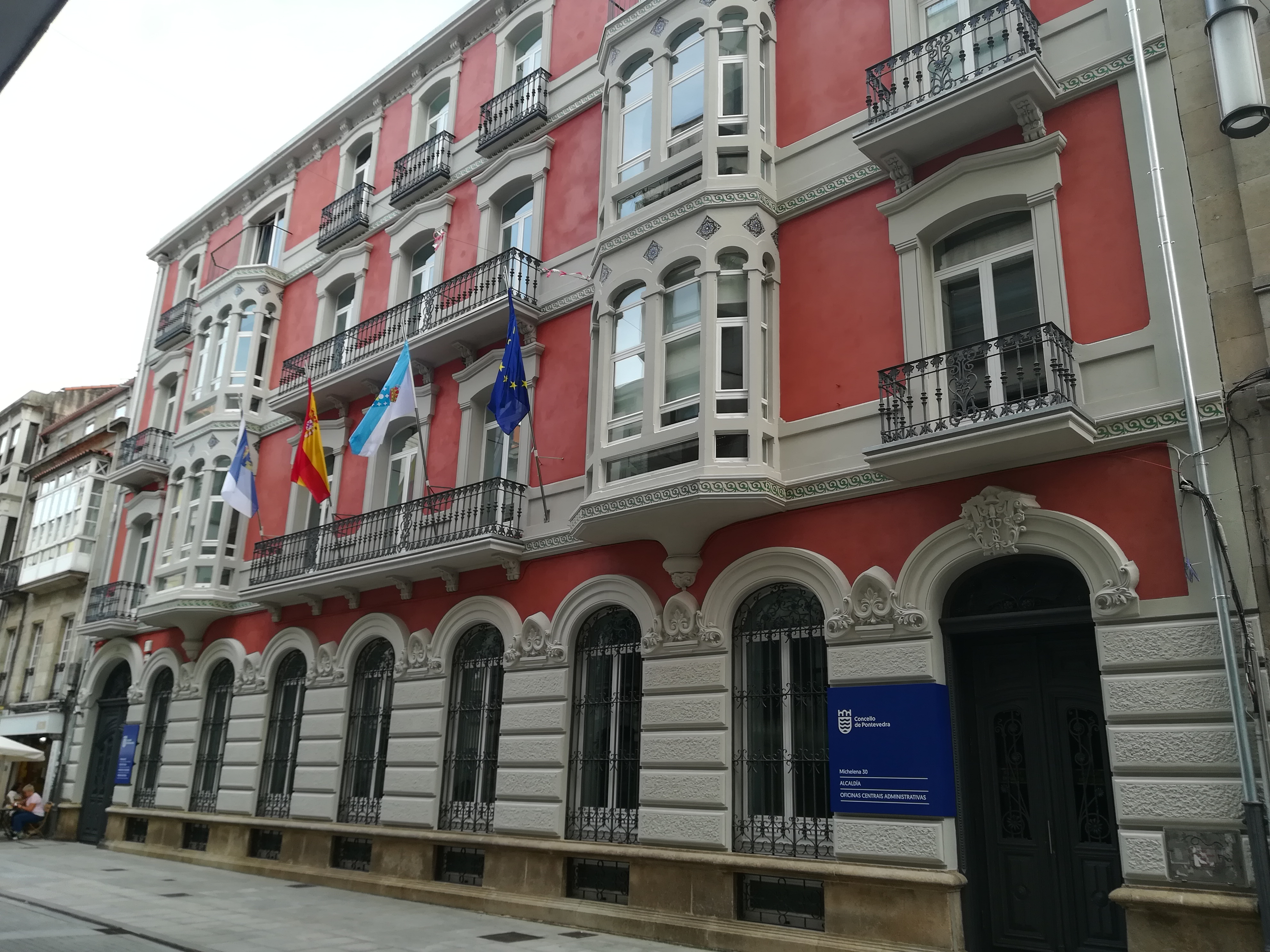
- Façade in Michelena Street, 30
- Interactive map of the Mansion of the Marquis of Riestra area

General information
- Type: Mansion
- Architectural style: Eclectic architecture
- Location: Pontevedra, Galicia, Spain
- Coordinates: 42°25′53″N 8°38′45″W
- Construction started: end of the 19th century
- Completed: 1900
- Owner: City Council of Pontevedra

Technical details
- Floor count: 4

The Marquis of Riestra's mansion is an eclectic building with art Nouveau elements from the late 19th century located at 30 Michelena Street in Pontevedra, Spain. It currently houses the main central administrative services of the City Council of Pontevedra.

== History ==
The mansion was built for Francisco Antonio Riestra Vallaure after the purchase of several plots of land in the 1860s in Michelena Street, where he had fourteen buildings constructed. His son and Marquis of Riestra, José Riestra López, established the headquarters of his Bank Riestra and a private residence there. Its refurbishment with its characteristic pink-orange brick façade was completed in 1900.

The Marquis of Riestra died in his mansion at 30 Michelena Street in the early hours of 17 January 1923, after having gone out by car the previous afternoon to A Caeira. In 1925, wooden galleries were added to the third floor. The four living sons of the Marquis of Riestra lived in the mansion with their families, each occupying one of the three floors (two of them on the third floor). In 1931 the Riestra family lost their father's holding company to the businessman Pedro Barrié de la Maza.

On 19 July 1932, the building passed into the hands of the Pastor Bank, housing the offices of this institution and of the Fenosa electricity company, which belonged to the same group. Between the 1970s and 1980s, it was the local headquarters of the UCD, the central government party. Later, it was the headquarters of the provincial agricultural and labour offices of the Xunta de Galicia.

In 1988 the Xunta de Galicia bought the three floors and the attic of the building from the Pastor Bank for 80 million pesetas. On 30 January 1990, the Xunta de Galicia's General Directorate of Heritage paid the public limited company Unión Fenosa a total of 235 million pesetas for the ground floor, the basement and a small interior garden, thus completing the acquisition of the building for the new offices of its Department of Economy and Finance.

The mansion underwent a complete renovation in the 1990s. It was the headquarters of the Department of Economy and Finance of the Xunta de Galicia until its relocation to the new administrative building in Campolongo in 2008.

In 2010, the Xunta de Galicia handed over the building to the City Council of Pontevedra to house its central services.

In 2022, the facade of the building was renovated and its characteristic pink-orange bricks were removed.

== Description ==
The mansion was built in an eclectic style with art nouveau elements. It is a three-storey building with a single body and a square plan. It has a gallery façade with horseshoe arches and decorative frames on all the windows. The windows and carriage entrance on the ground floor are framed by semi-circular arches. The ground floor is surrounded by a granite base.

The façade is two-tone, with thin pink-orange bricks and white tones in the galleries and window decorative mouldings. The bricks, which were very fashionable in the late 19th and early 20th centuries on the facades, came from the former A Barca brick factory, close to A Caeira. They can also be found on the facade of the Pontevedra Teacher Training College and the Pontevedra bullring. The Marqués de Riestra himself founded the A Caeira pottery factory in 1895, where the bricks came from.

The mansion originally consisted of a ground floor and two upper floors, to which a third floor was added following an extension. On the upper cornice of the building are 19th century tiles decorated with floral motifs.

It has a remarkable old carriage entrance, originally designed for carriages, and retains a wooden staircase dating from the beginning of the construction.

The interior has been completely rebuilt, with a functional use as offices. The building had the first lift installed in Galicia, which was moved to A Coruña at the beginning of the 21st century.

== Gallery ==
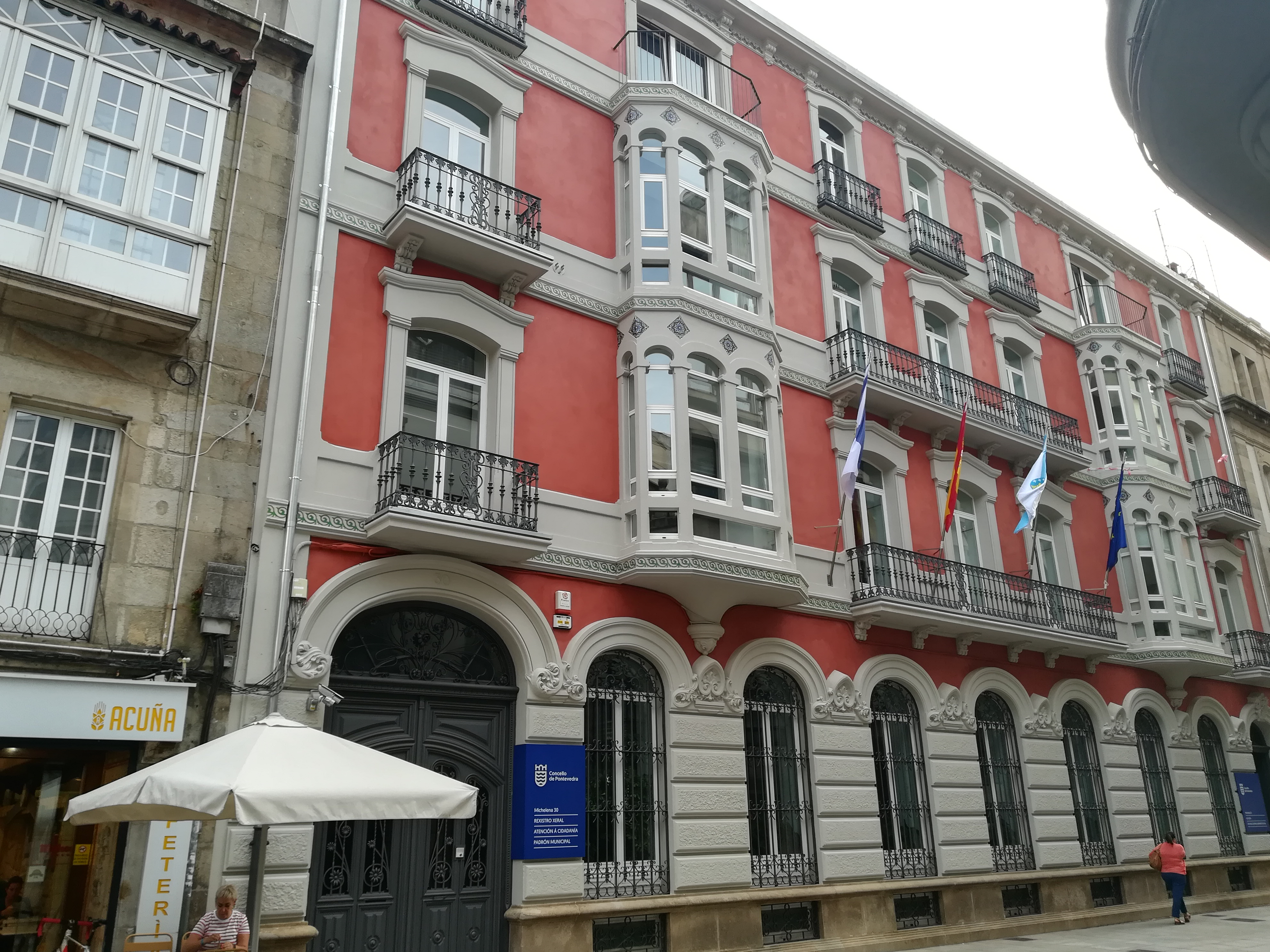
Old carriage entrance in the foreground

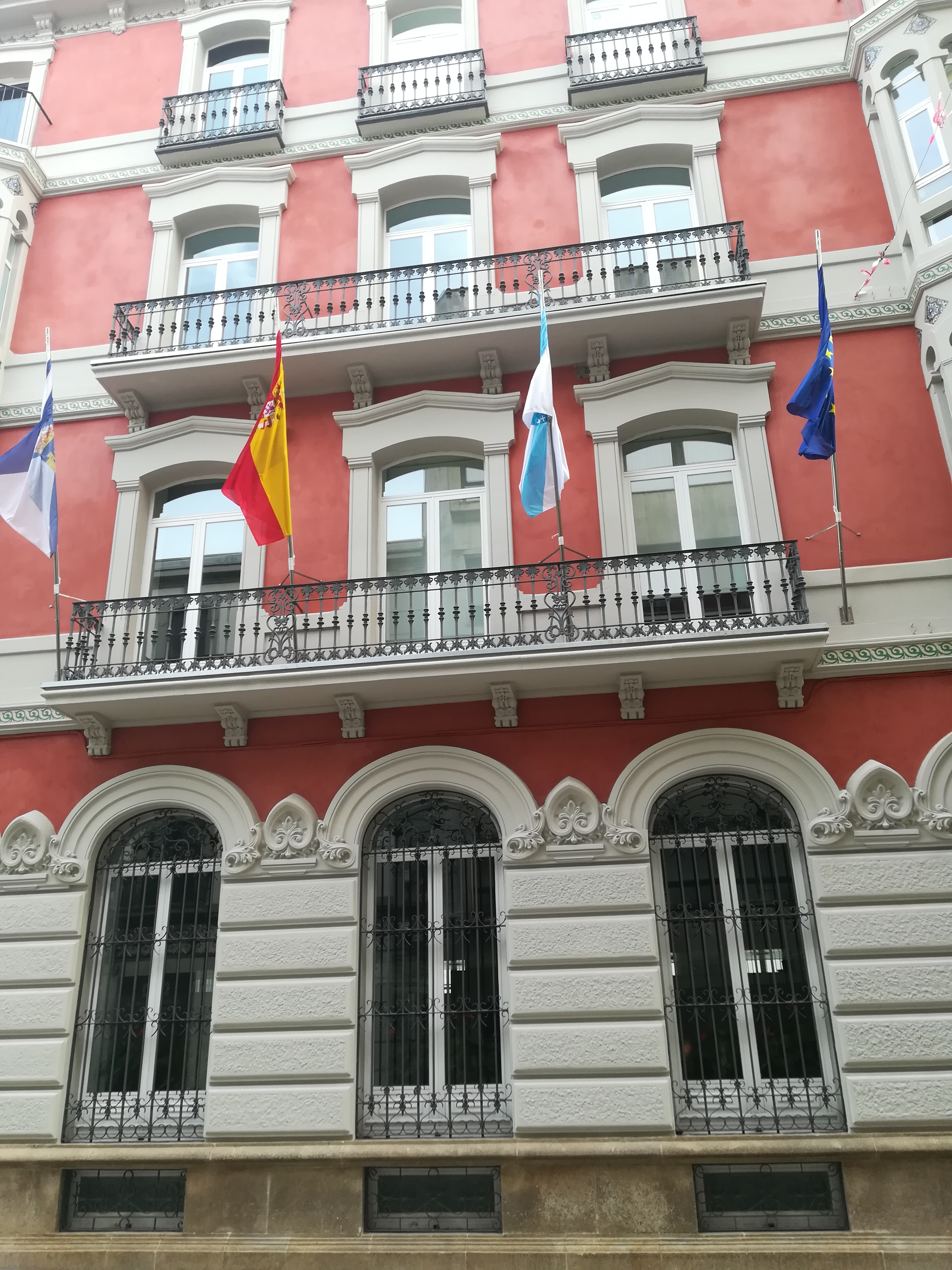
Balconies

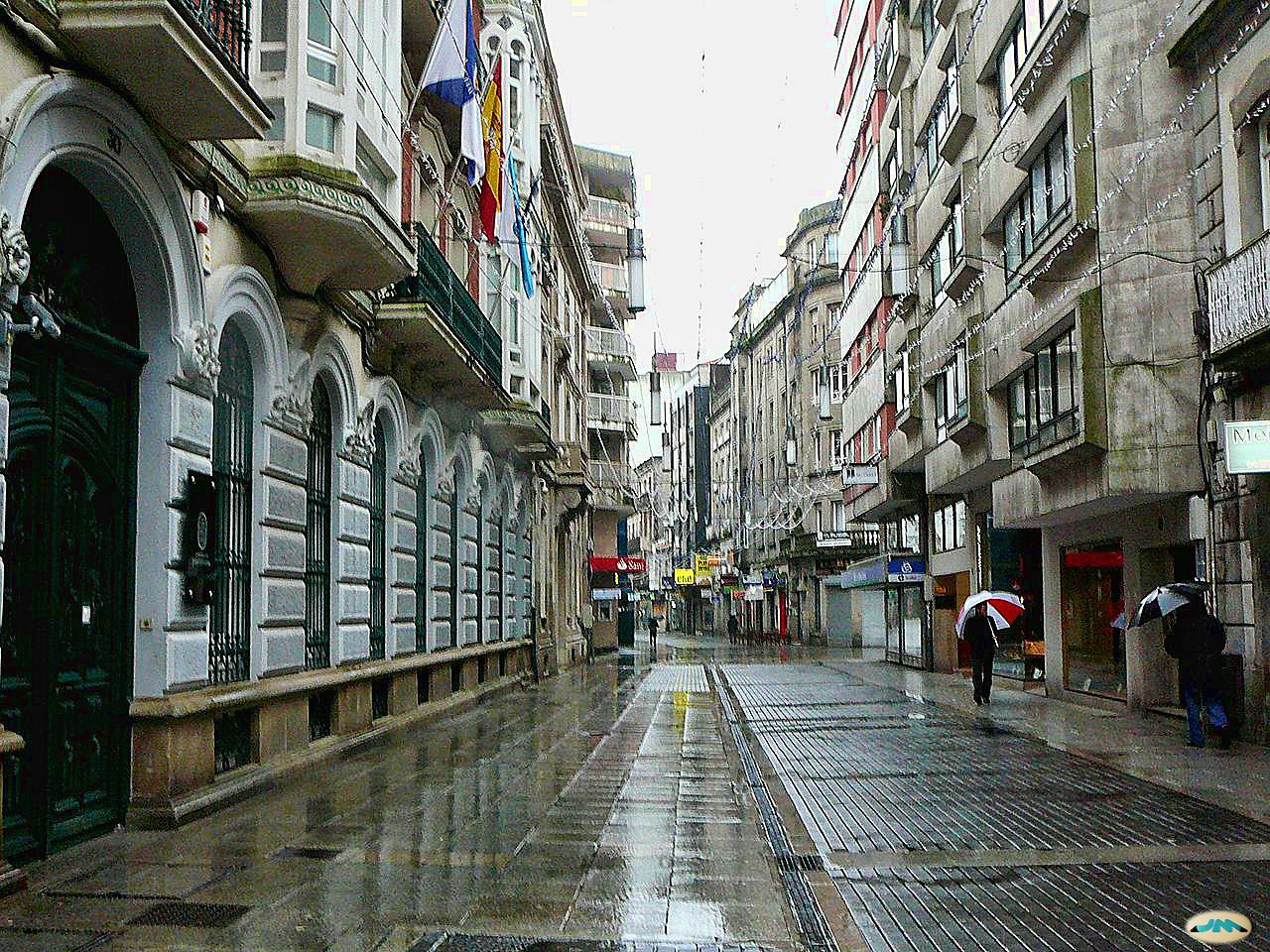
Michelena Street

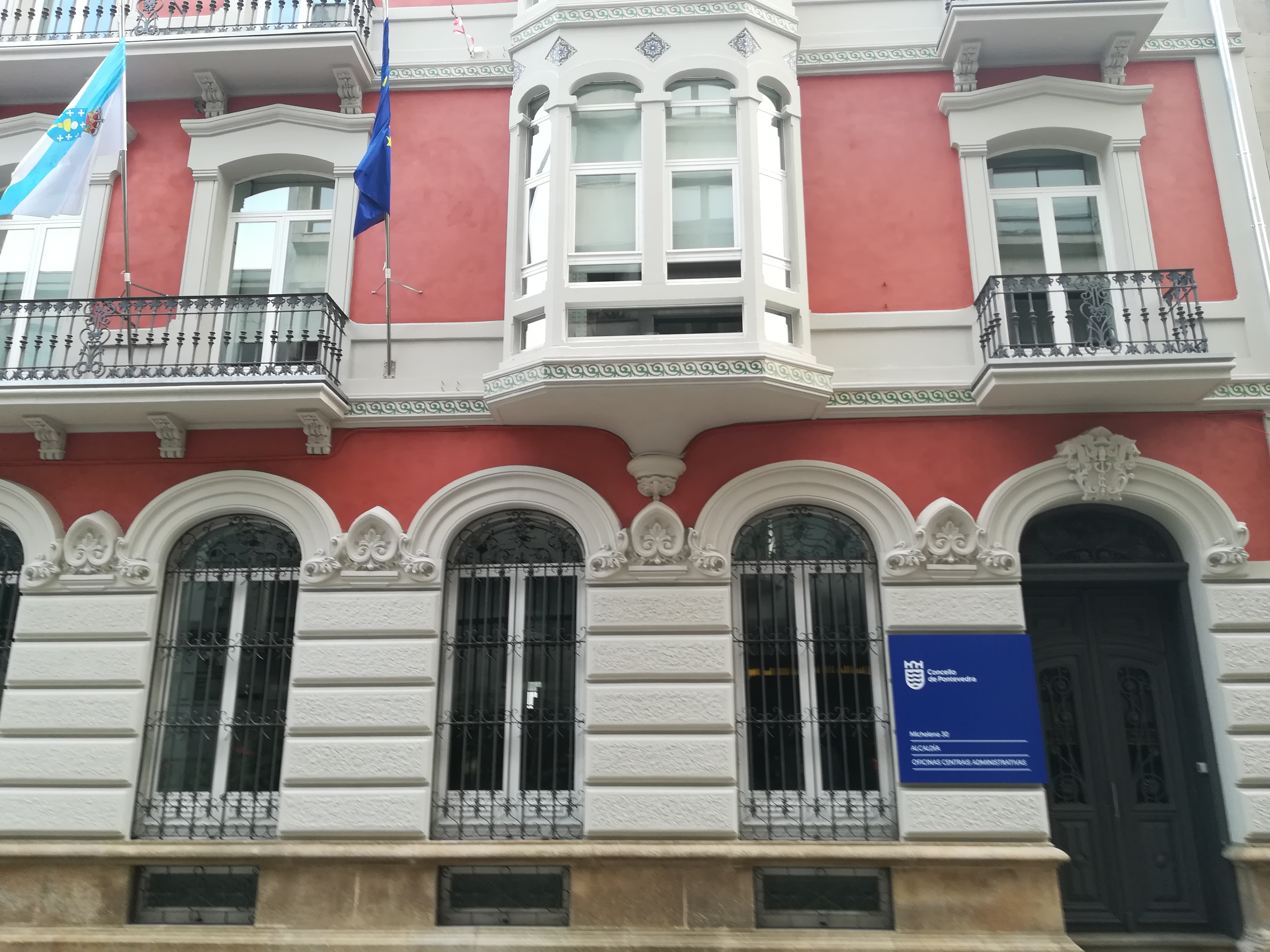

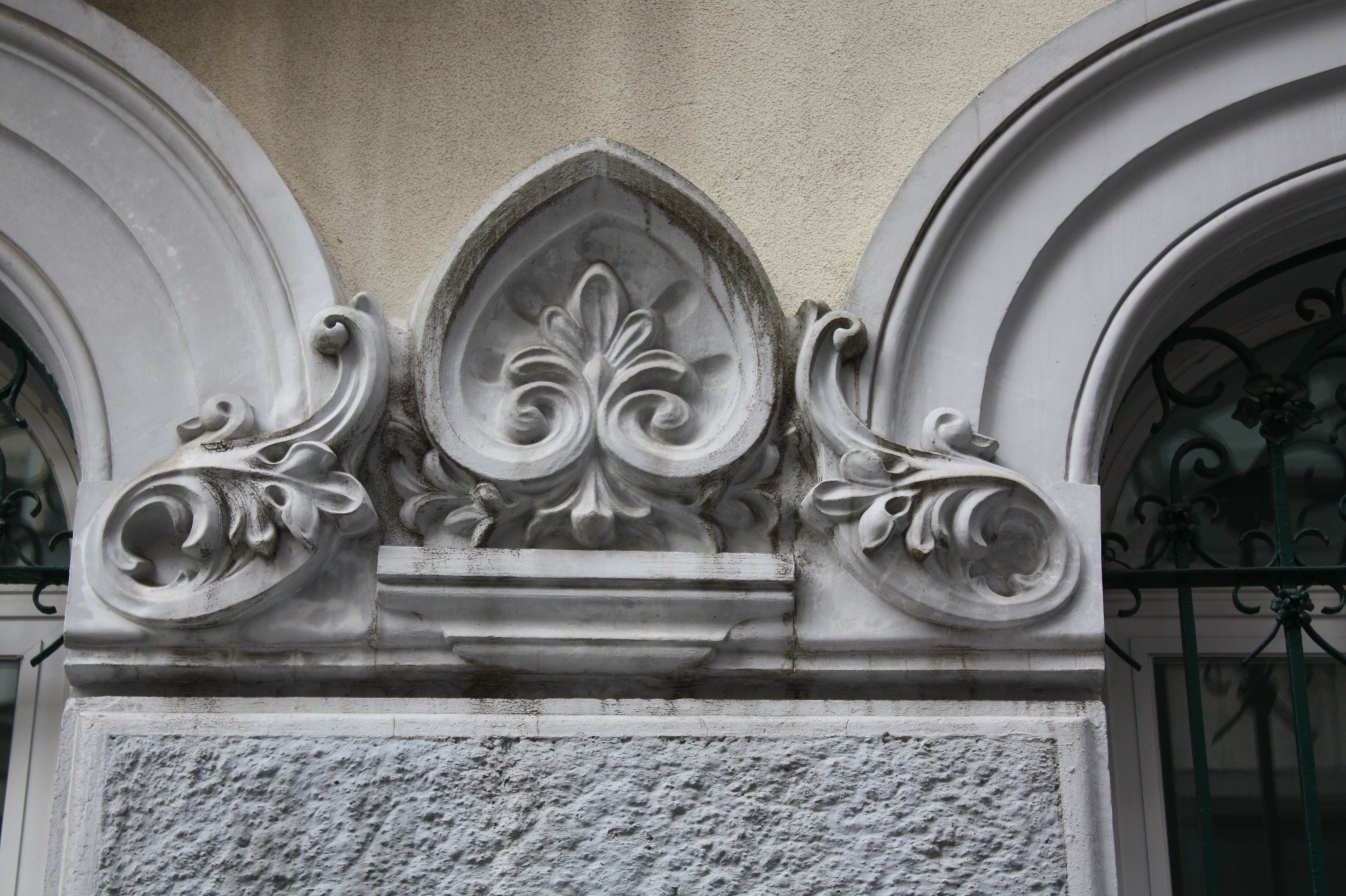
Art Nouveau detail

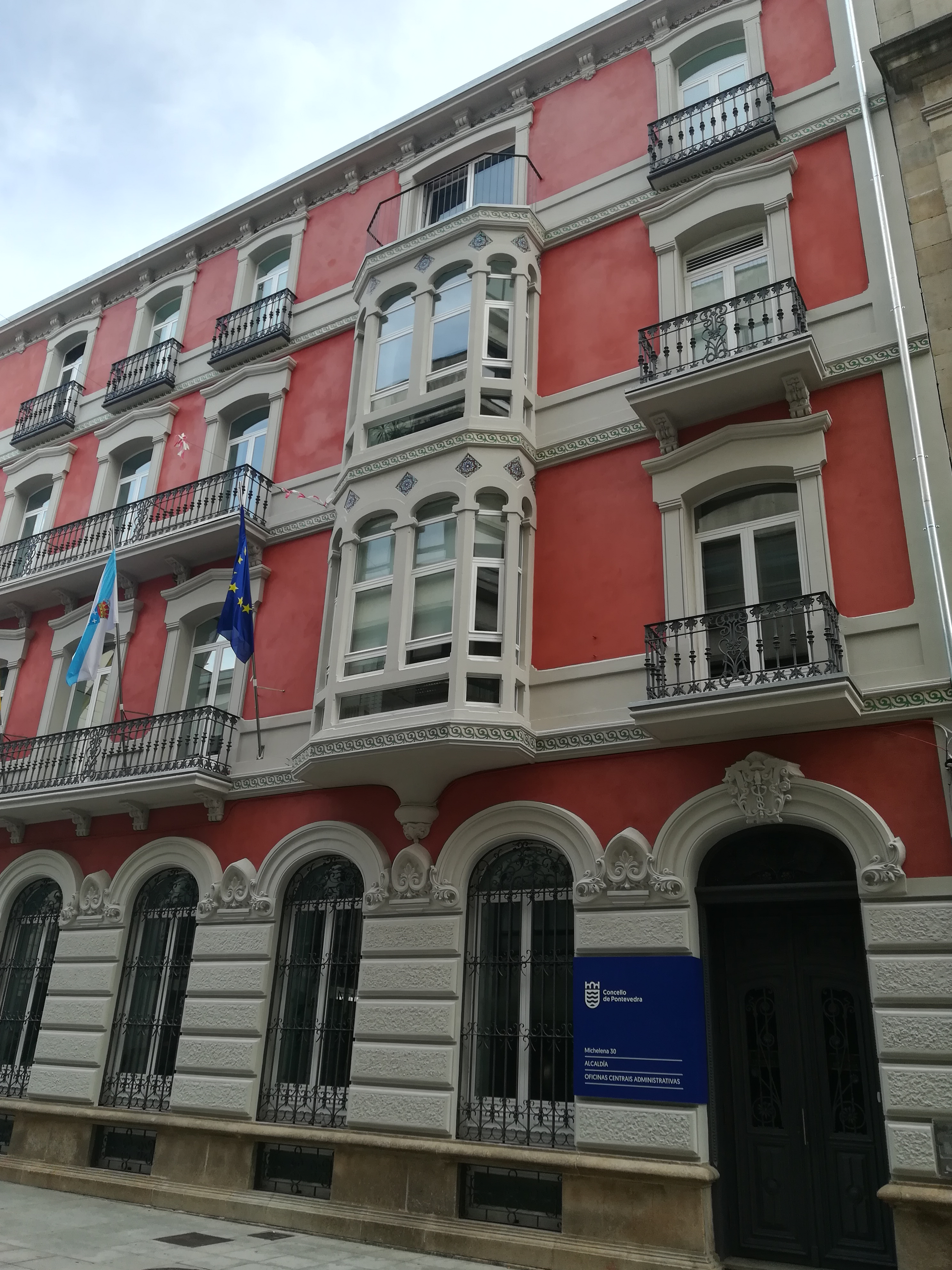

== See also ==
=== Bibliography ===
- Carmona Badía, Xoán (2009). Empresarios de Galicia. Volume 2 (in Galician). A Coruña: CIEF, Centro de Investigación Económica e Financeira Fundación Caixa Galicia. pp. 255–257. ISBN 978-84-96982-37-6.
- Fontoira Surís, Rafael (2009). Pontevedra monumental (in Galician). Pontevedra: Diputación de Pontevedra. p. 427. ISBN 9788484573272.

=== Related articles ===
- Pontevedra City Hall
- Michelena Street

=== External links ===
- Mansion of the Marquis of Riestra
