= City Council of Pontevedra =

Municipal administration of Pontevedra, Spain

Type
- Type: Unicameral house of the Ayuntamiento of Pontevedra

Leadership
- Mayor: Miguel Anxo Fernández Lores, Galician Nationalist Bloc (BNG) since 4 July 1999

Structure
- Political groups: Government (9): BNG (9); Opposition (16): PSdeG–PSOE (5); PPdeG (11)
- Length of term: 4 years

Elections
- Last election: 28 May 2023
- Next election: 23 May 2027

Meeting place
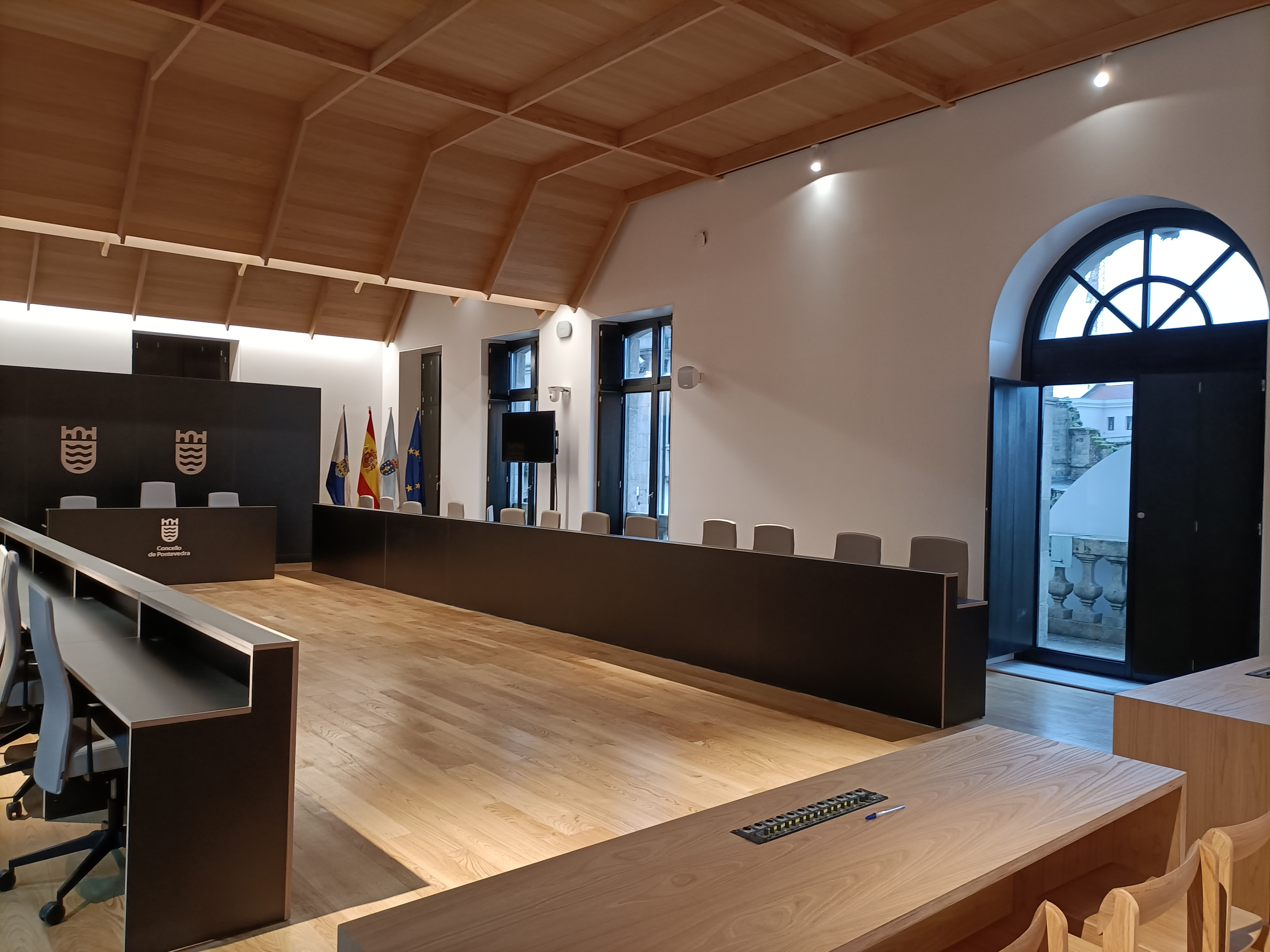
- Pontevedra City Hall

Website
- www.pontevedra.gal

The City Council of Pontevedra (Galician: Concello de Pontevedra; Spanish: Ayuntamiento de Pontevedra) is the top-tier administrative and governing body of the municipality of Pontevedra, Spain. The current mayor of Pontevedra is Miguel Anxo Fernández Lores, in office since 4 July 1999.

The city council is composed by three bodies: the mayor who leads the city council; the executive branch, the governing council, composed by the mayor and the councillors appointed by him; and the Plenary, a democratically elected assembly which represents the people of Pontevedra. The mayor is elected by the members of the plenary among its members the day the new municipal corporation is formed after the local election.

Since 1880, the city council is headquartered at the Pontevedra City Hall. Since 2010, its central administrative services are housed in the Michelena 30 building. Between 2010 and 2024, during a comprehensive reform of the City Hall, the council plenary sessions were held at the Principal Theatre.

== Local Elections ==
Results of recent municipal elections in Pontevedra
Party	2023			2019			2015			2011			2007		
Party	%	Votes	Seats	%	Votes	Seats	%	Votes	Seats	%	Votes	Seats	%	Votes	Seats
Galician Nationalist Bloc (BNG)	31.37	13 000	9	39.79	16 500	11	43.08	17 050	12	39.25	17 130	11	28.26	12 412	7
People's Party of Galicia (PPdeG)	38.85	16 096	11	30.00	12 440	9	27.10	10 725	7	39.52	17 244	11	44.15	19 387	12
Socialists' Party of Galicia (PSdeG–PSOE)	17.71	7 340	5	13.98	5 797	4	10.81	4 277	3	13.30	5 803	3	22.33	9 807	6
Citizens (Cs)	0.95	396	-	5.17	2 142	1	5.73	2 268	1	-	-	-	-	-	-
Marea Pontevedra (MA.PO)-United Left (EU)	-	-	-	3.60	1 492	-	8.14	3 222	2	1.63	712	-	1.35	594	-

== Mayors ==
On 3 April 1979, the city council was reconstituted as a democratic entity, with the first democratic elections during the Spanish transition to democracy. The Mayors since then are:

List of mayors since the democratic elections of 1979
Term	Mayor	Political party
1979–1983	José Rivas Fontán	Union of the Democratic Centre (UCD)
1983–1987	José Rivas Fontán	People's Alliance (AP)
1987–1991	José Rivas Fontán	Independientes de Galicia
1991–1995	Francisco Javier Cobián Salgado	People's Party of Galicia (PPdeG)
1995–1999	Juan Luis Pedrosa Fernández	Partido Popular de Galicia (PPdeG)
1999–2003	Miguel Anxo Fernández Lores	Galician Nationalist Bloc (BNG)
2003–2007	Miguel Anxo Fernández Lores	Galician Nationalist Bloc (BNG)
2007–2011	Miguel Anxo Fernández Lores	Galician Nationalist Bloc (BNG)
2011–2015	Miguel Anxo Fernández Lores	Galician Nationalist Bloc (BNG)
2015–2019	Miguel Anxo Fernández Lores	Galician Nationalist Bloc (BNG)
2019–2023	Miguel Anxo Fernández Lores	Galician Nationalist Bloc (BNG)
2023–	Miguel Anxo Fernández Lores	Galician Nationalist Bloc (BNG)

== See also ==
- Local government in Spain
