= Estadio Municipal de Pasarón =

Football stadium in Pontevedra, Spain

Pasarón
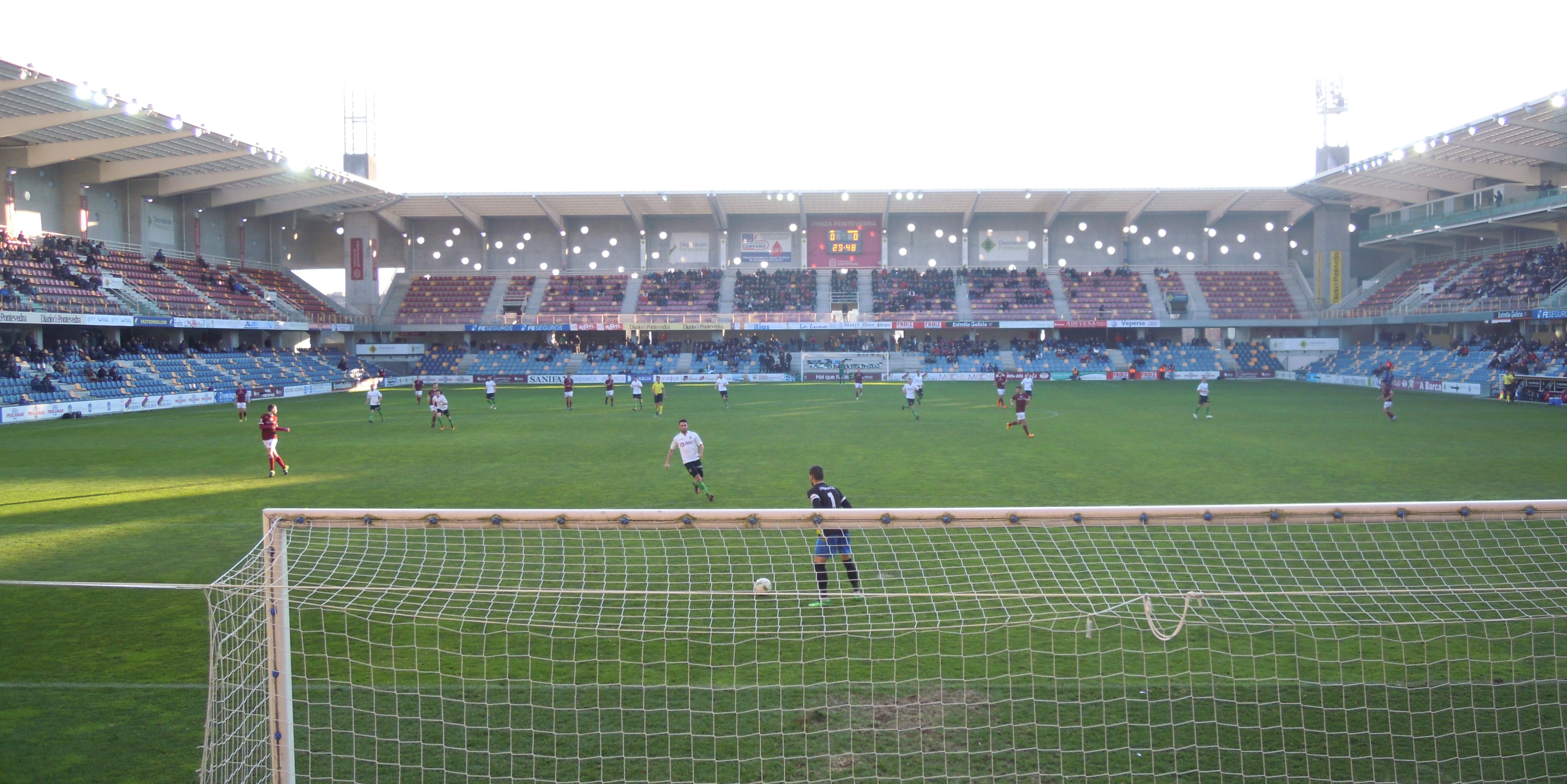
- Interactive map of Pasarón
- Full name: Estadio Municipal de Pasarón
- Location: Pontevedra, Spain
- Coordinates: 42.438°N 8.641°W
- Owner: City Council of Pontevedra
- Capacity: 12,000
- Surface: Grass
- Field size: 105 m × 68 m (344 ft × 223 ft)

Construction
- Opened: 1965
- Expanded: 2010

Tenant
- Pontevedra CF

Estadio Municipal de Pasarón is an all-seater football stadium located in Pontevedra, Galicia, Spain.

== History ==
Precedents

The old stadium of Pasarón was inaugurated in 1965, just some months before the Pontevedra CF's debut in Primera División.

New stadium

Following the promotion to Segunda of Pontevedra CF in the 2003–04 season, plans for a new municipal stadium were brought forward, although building works did not begin until 2006. Pontevedra began to play in the new stadium in 2010. On 7 September 2012, the stadium held a friendly fixture between Spain and Saudi Arabia (5–0).

== Ownership and features ==
The stadium is owned and operated by the City Council of Pontevedra and has a capacity of 12,000.

== Related articles ==
- O Burgo
