= The Fiel contraste =

Statue in Pontevedra, Spain

The Fiel Contraste
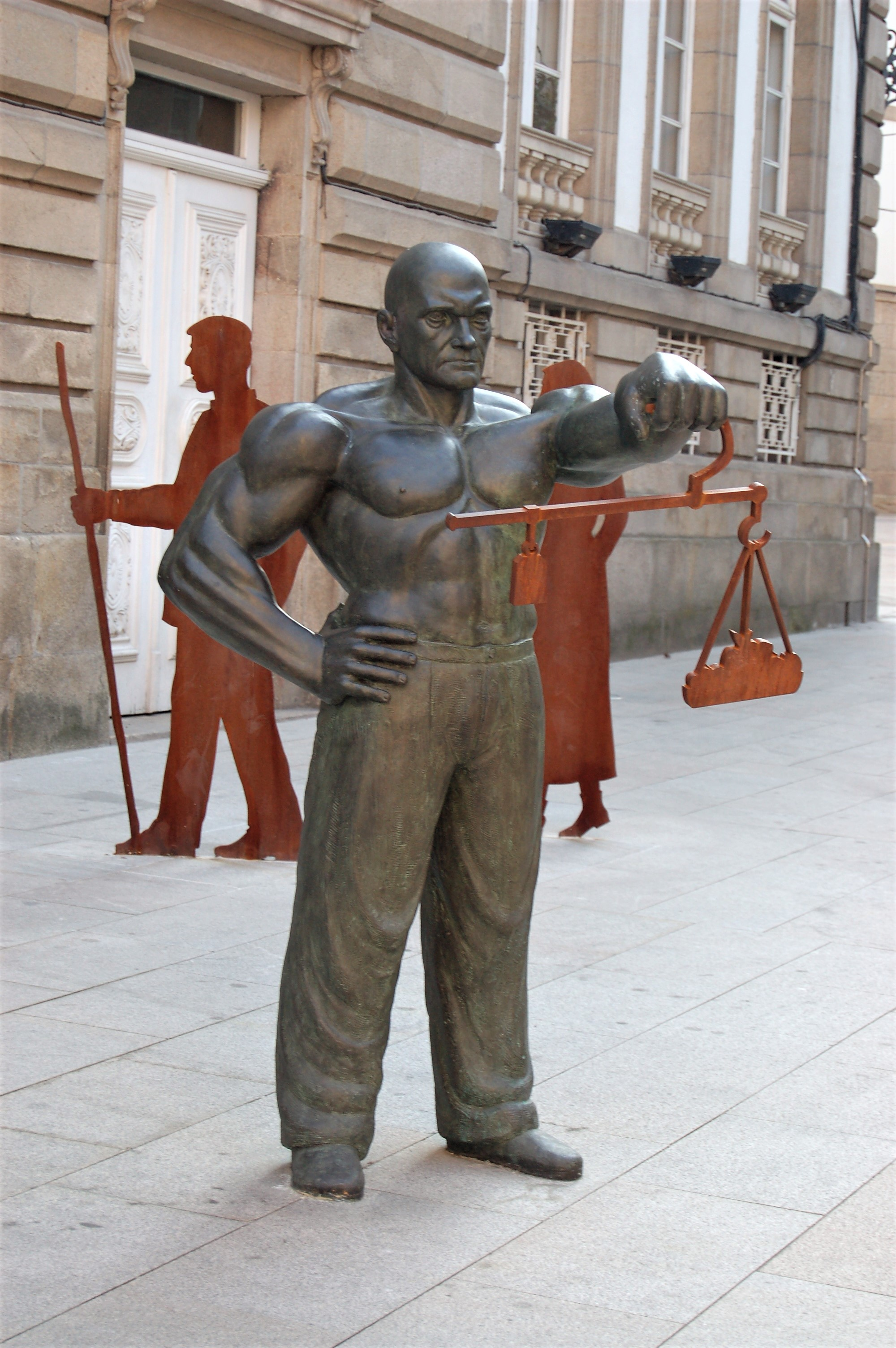
- The statue in 2011
- Artist: Ramón Conde
- Completion date: 30 April 2010; 16 years ago
- Medium: Bronze, Corten steel
- Subject: The Fiel Contraste
- Condition: Good
- Location: Pontevedra, Spain; 42°25′55.6″N 8°38′48.0″W

The Fiel contraste is a sculptural group created by the Spanish sculptor Ramón Conde, located in Pontevedra, Spain. It stands in Alhóndiga street, behind the Pontevedra City Hall, and was inaugurated on 30 April 2010.

== History ==
The sculptural group is located in the place where the Alhóndiga or municipal grain market was in the Middle Ages. The central statue recalls the medieval Civil Servant (hired by the town hall) who, at the entrance to the walls of Pontevedra, near the Bastida Tower, faithfully contrasted with his scales the weights and measures of the goods that were to be sold in the city.

Until the 16th century, the Alhóndiga was located where the Pontevedra City Hall is today. At the entrance to the Alhóndiga, the Fiel Contraste was responsible for checking the weights and measures of all the goods that arrived there to be sold. The taxes on the market depended on the verification of the weight of bread or cereals or the measures of wine. The disappearance of this profession occurred with the unification of weights and measures brought about by the Bourbon administration, with the appearance of the metric system and, finally, with the inauguration of the current City Hall in 1880.

The commercial and fishing boom in Pontevedra had boosted the holding of markets in the city, notably the Feira Franca granted to Pontevedra in 1467 by King Henry IV of Castile, when the city was the main port in Galicia.

== Description ==
The sculptural group consists of five pieces. The central bronze piece is the Faithful Contrast, which represents a Herculean man (characteristic of Ramón Conde's work) and timeless, with his left arm extended holding a pair of scales in his hand. The statue is 1.93 metres (6 ft 4 in) high and weighs 300 kg (660 lb). His strong features denote power and authority in the exercise of his function to resolve conflicts about the exact weight of products in the city's fairs and markets.

Around this central statue are four two-dimensional pieces of Corten Steel in the form of silhouettes or shadows depicting popular characters from a medieval city market, such as shopkeepers with their baskets in front of them or merchants on any given day in a city market.

The sculptural group is valued at 100,000 euros.

== Gallery ==
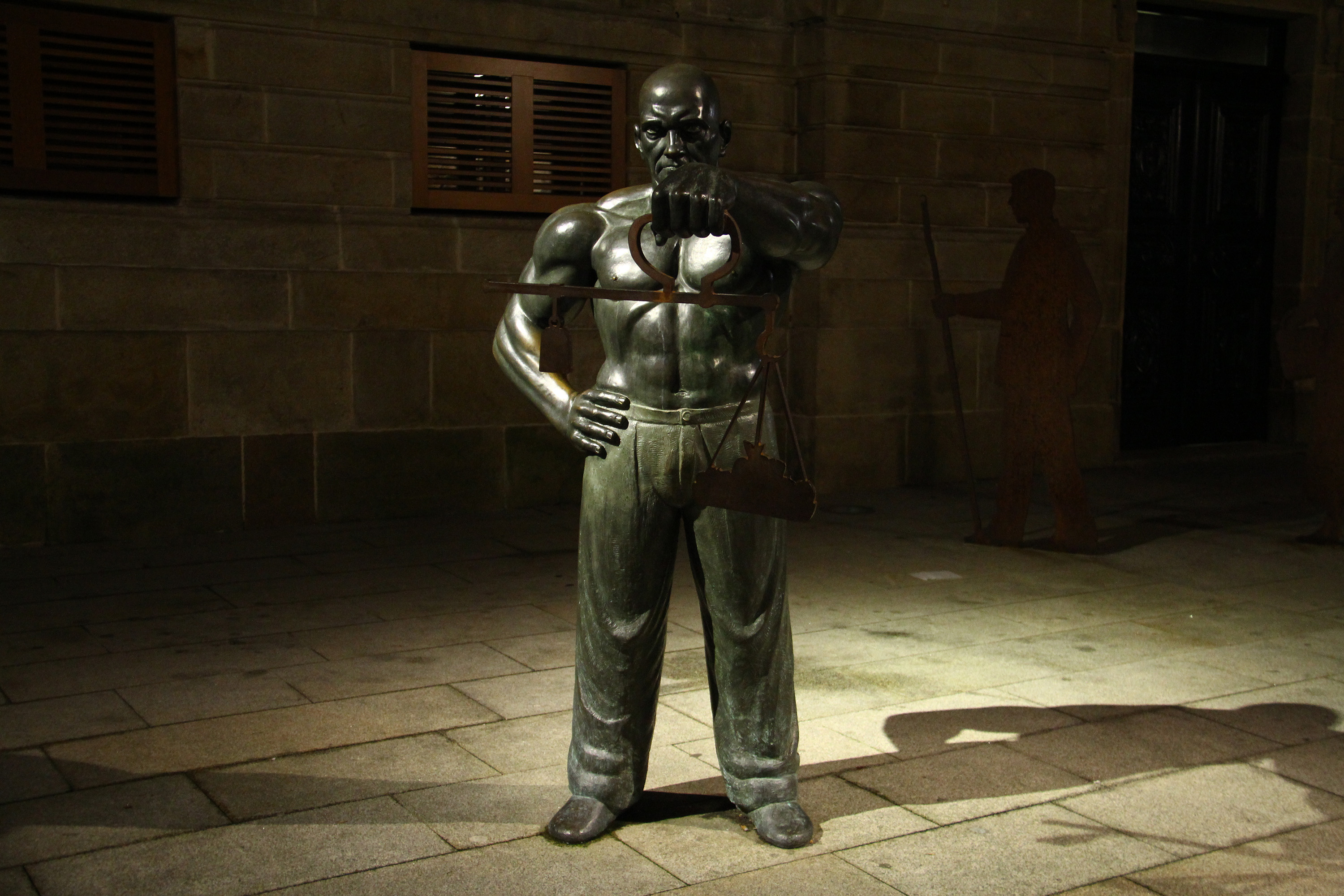

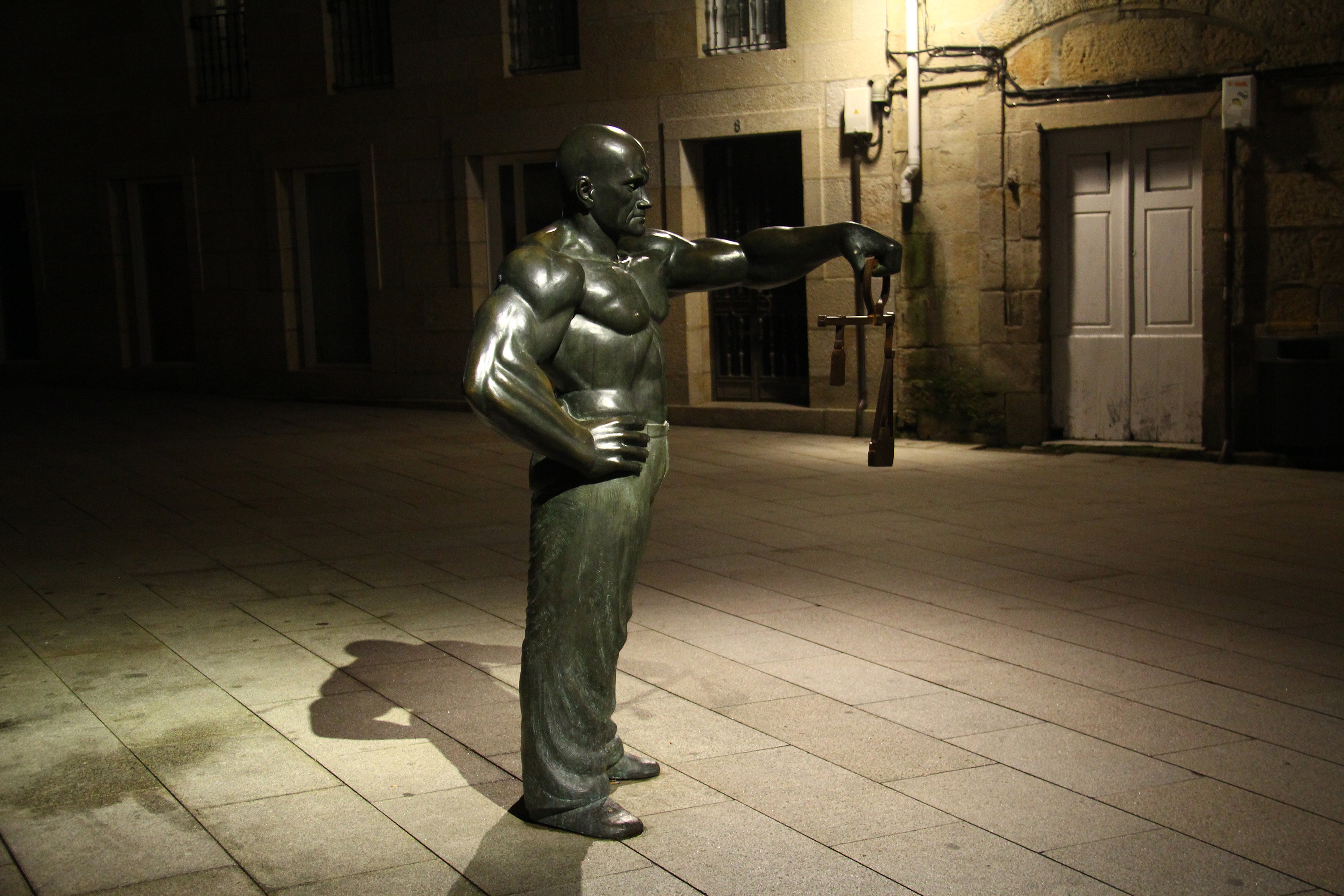

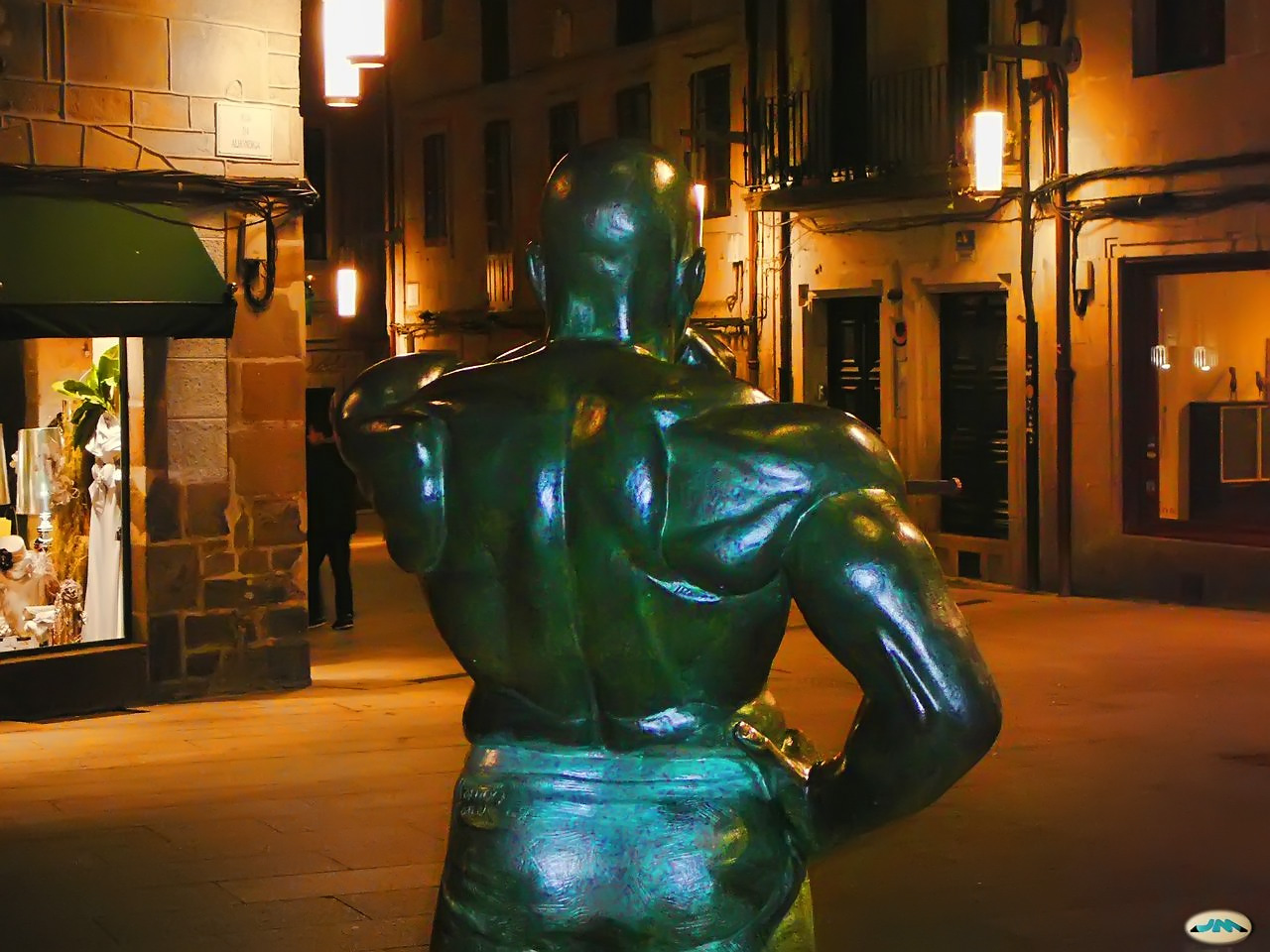

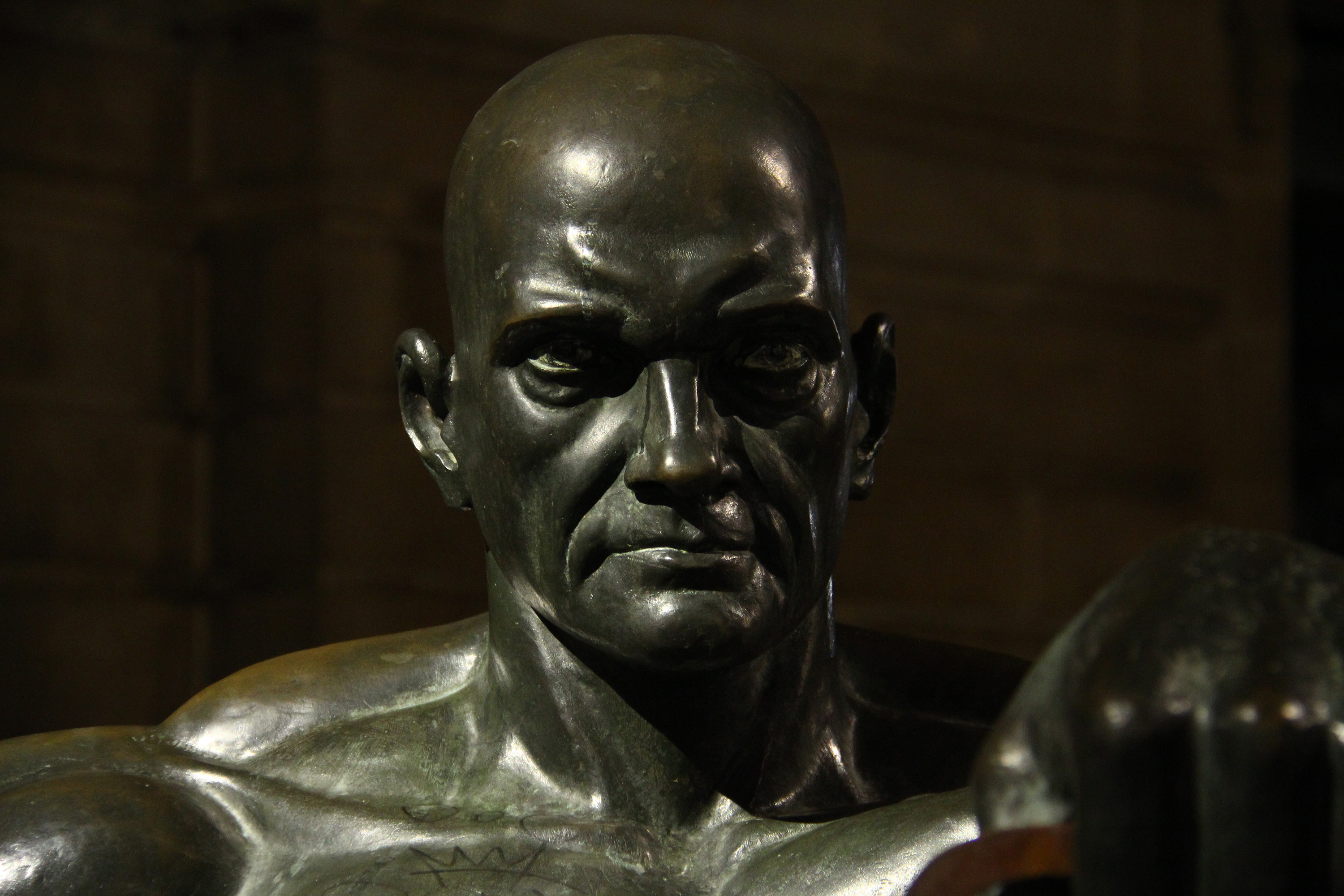

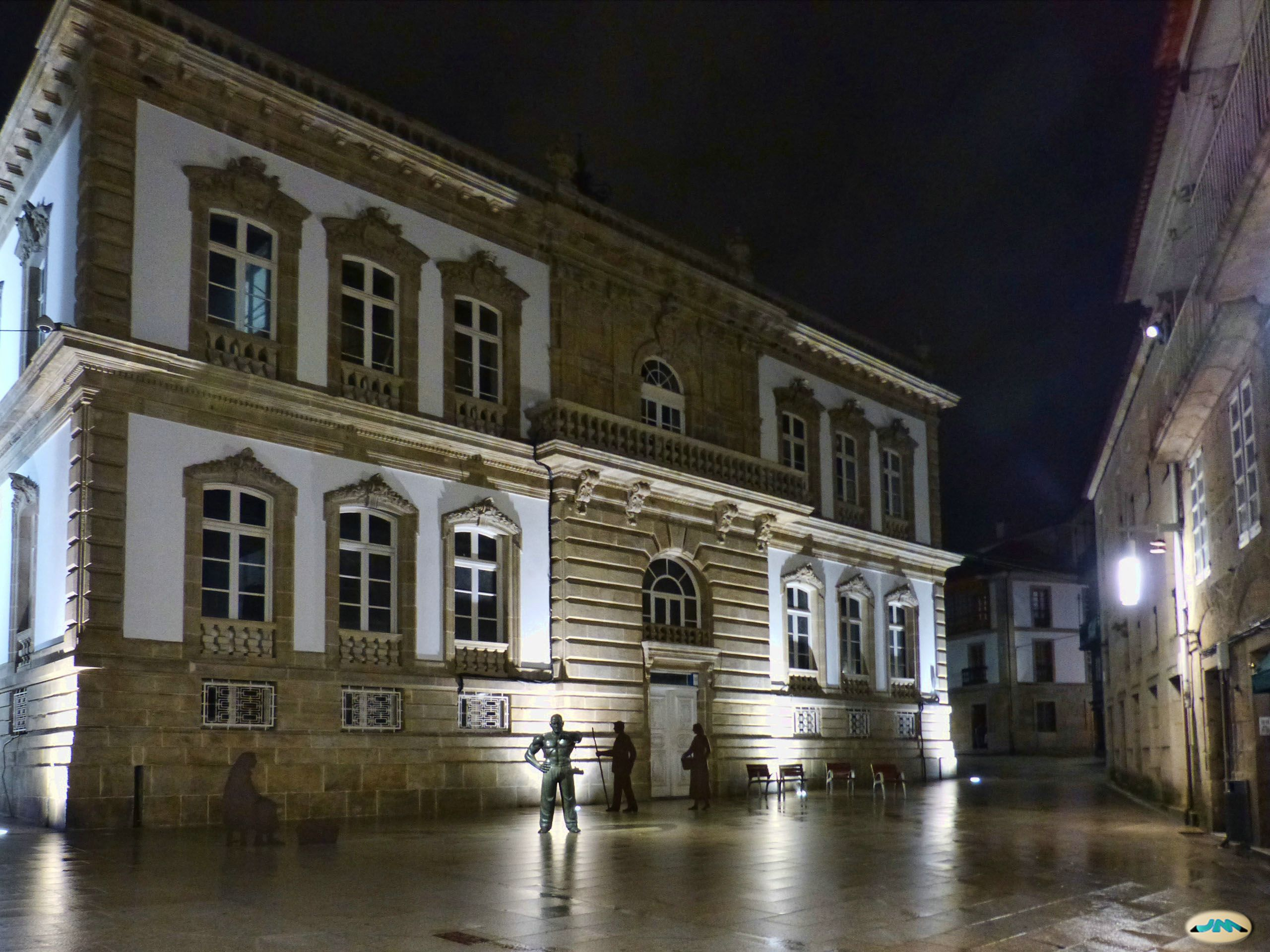

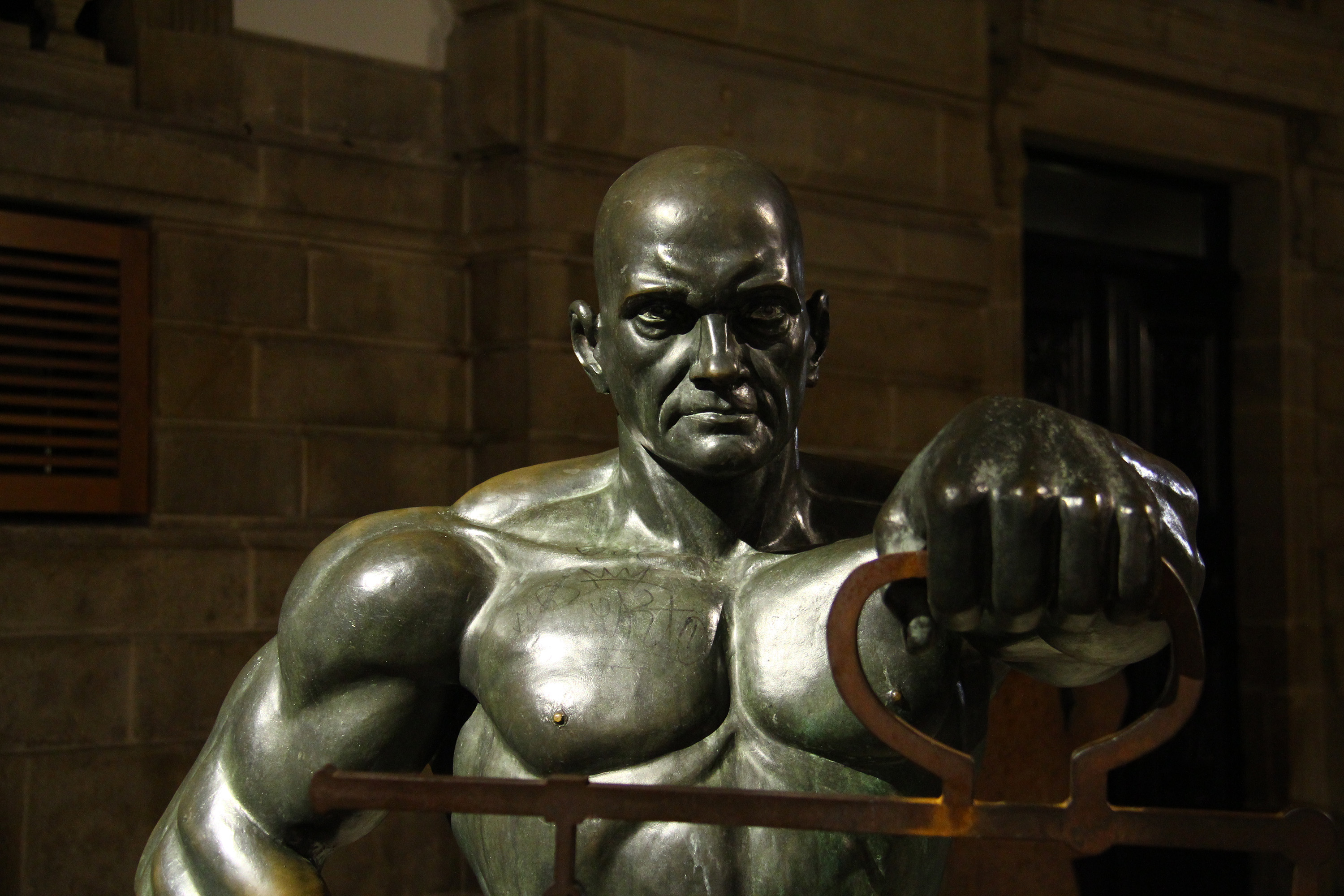

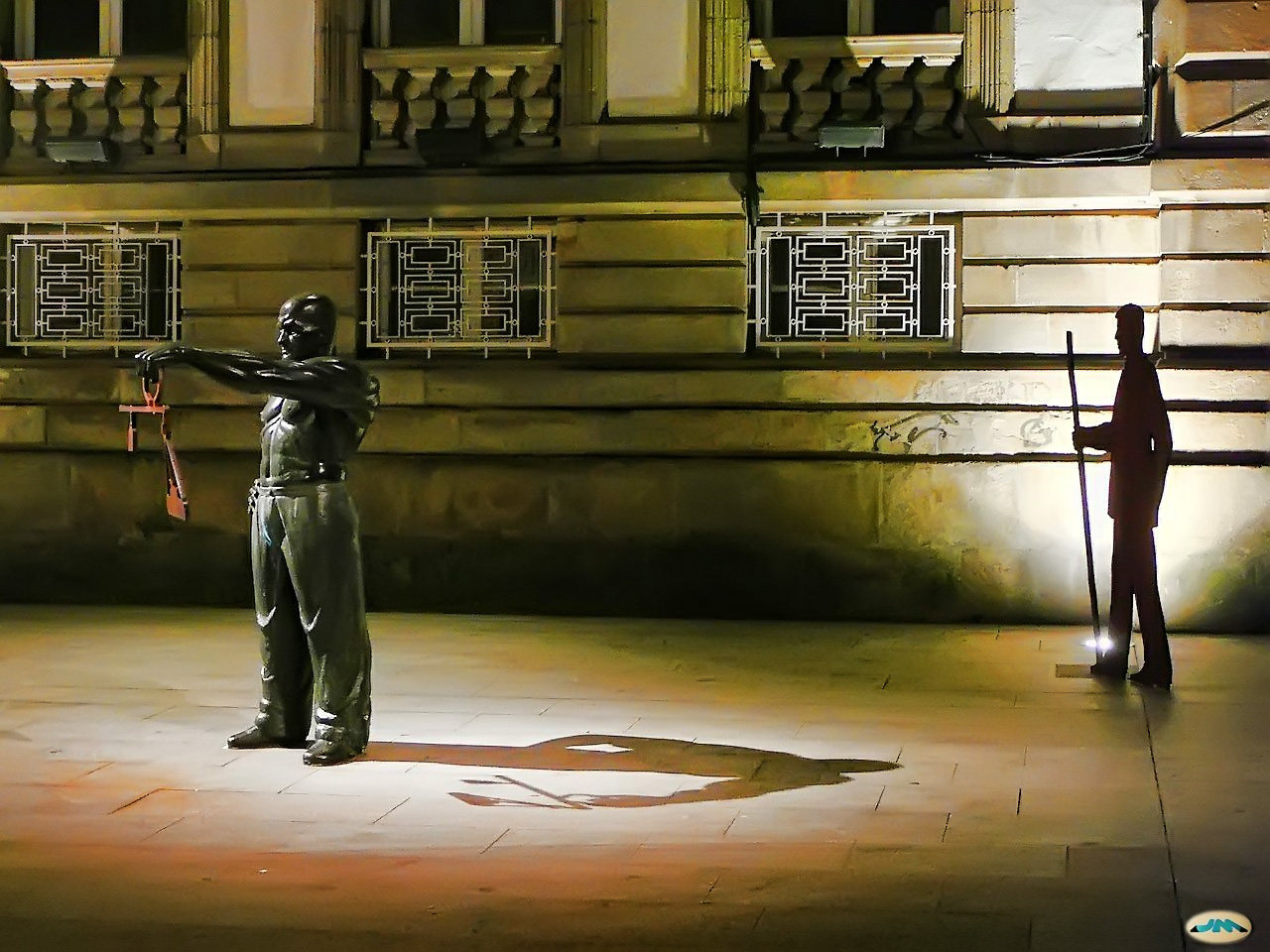

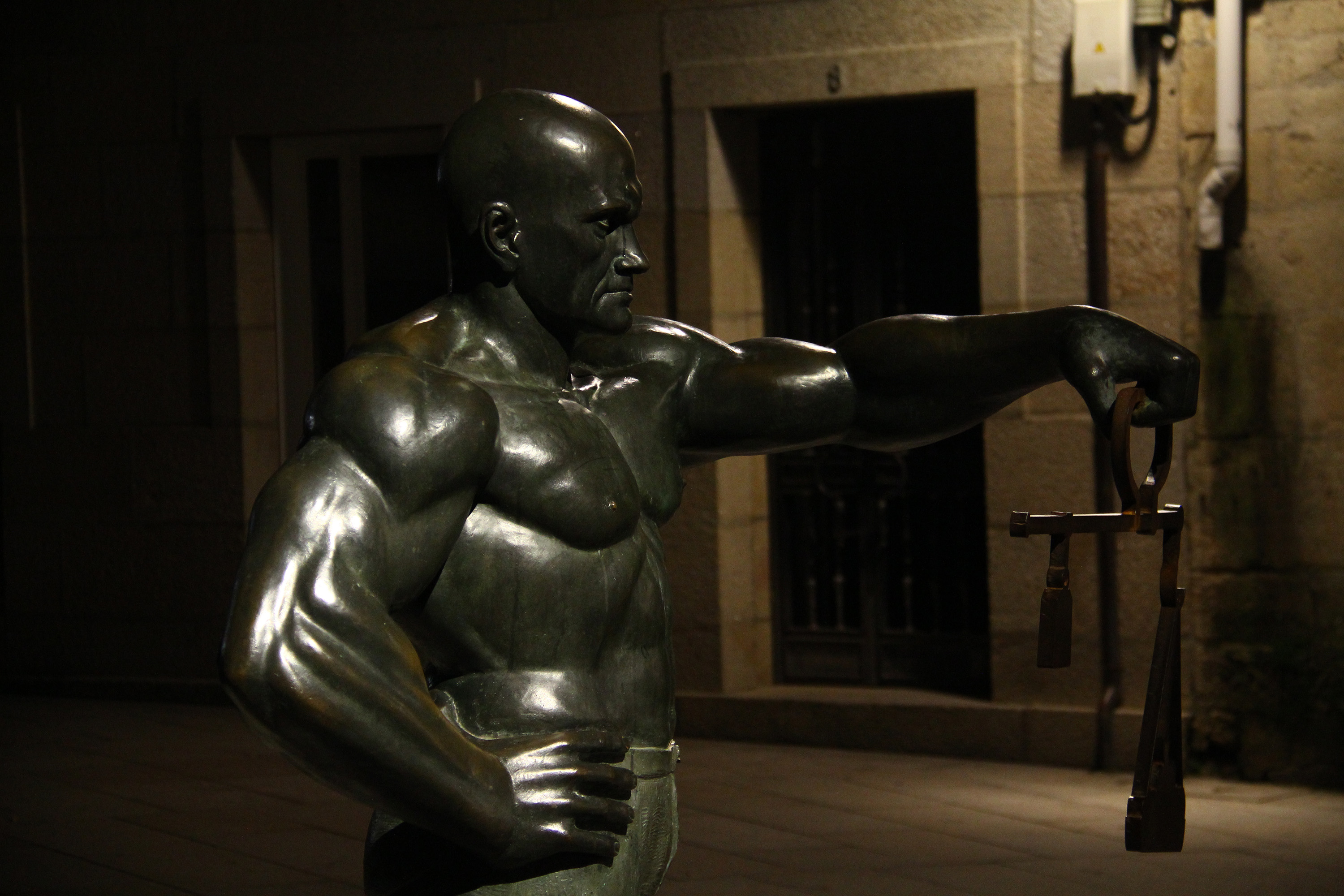

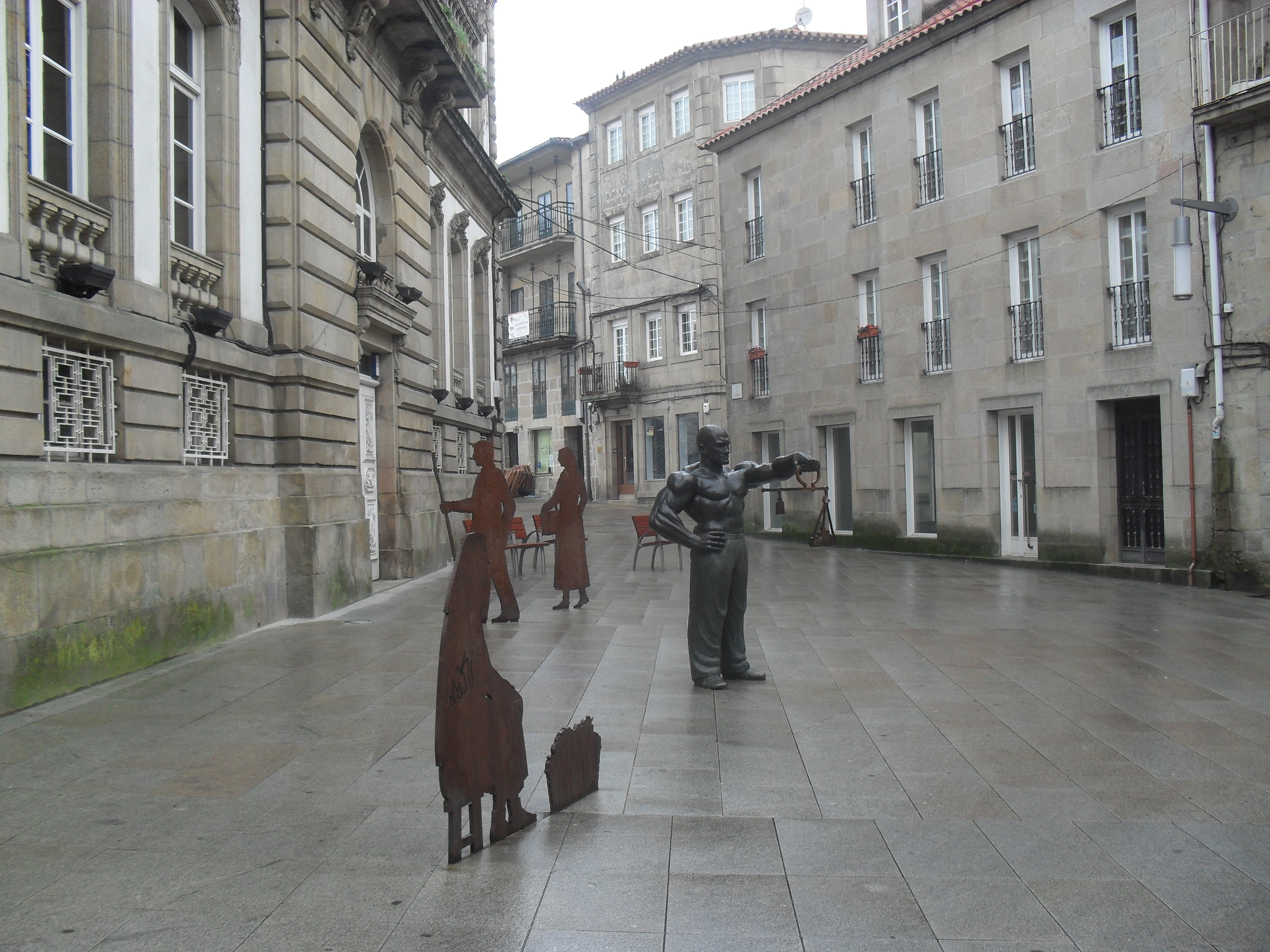

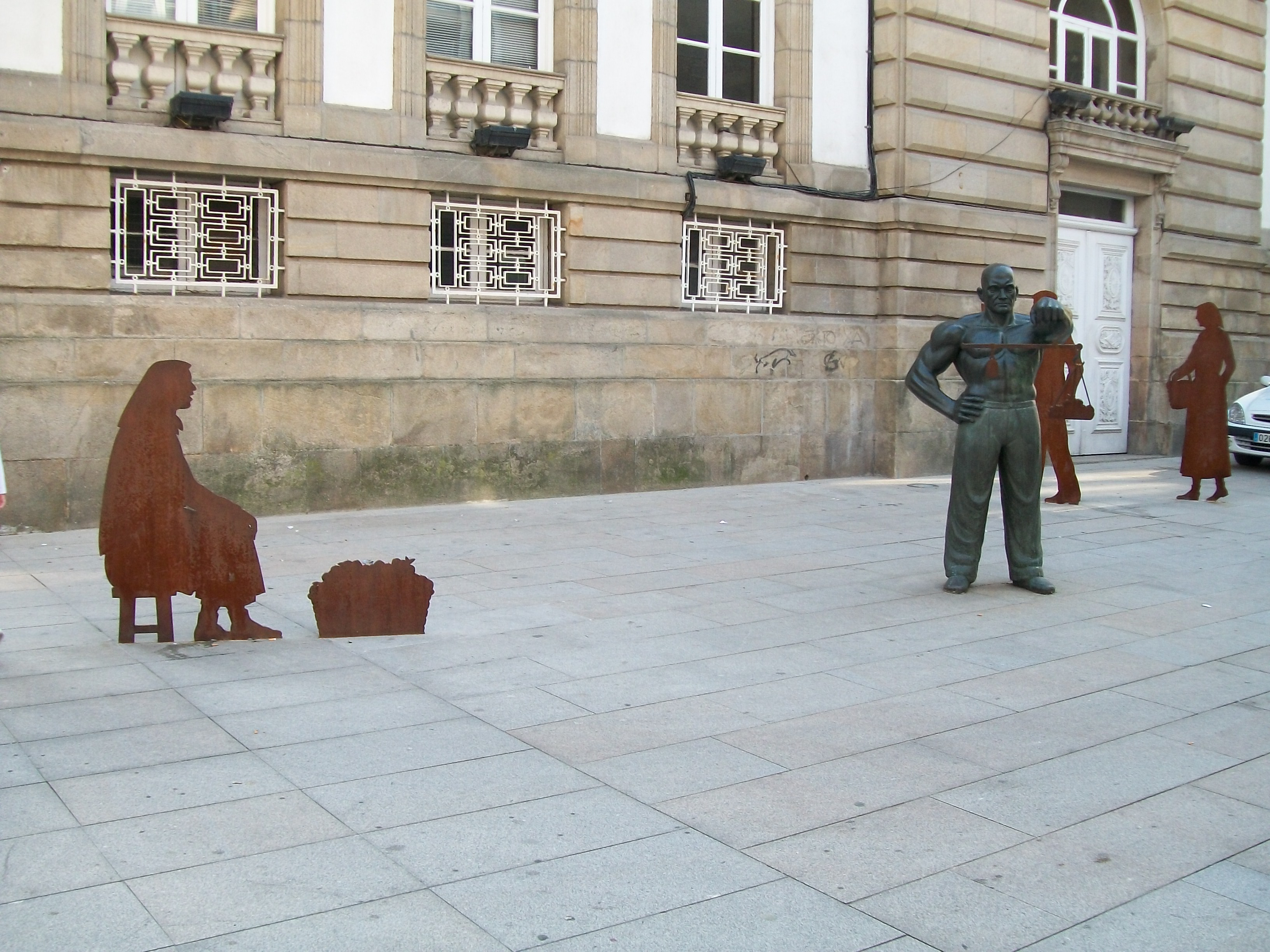

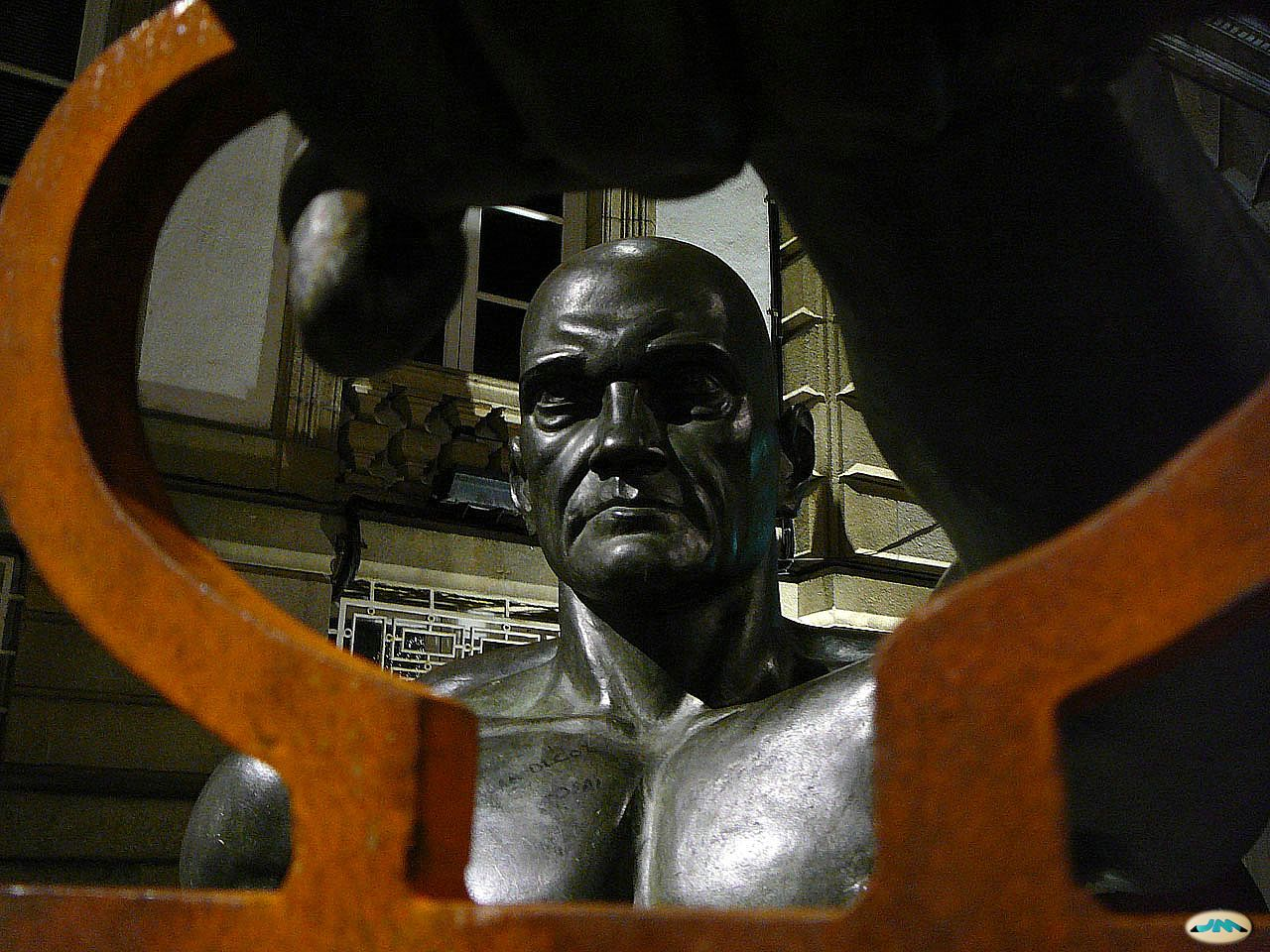

== See also ==
=== Related articles ===
- Pontevedra City Hall

=== External links ===
- https://www.outono.net/elentir/2016/01/26/el-fiel-contraste-un-monumento-al-almotacen-de-pontevedra/
- http://esculturayarte.com/022739/Fiel-Contraste-1-en-Pontevedra.html#.X8aQe86g82w
