= Pontevedra City Hall =

Eclectic City Hall in Pontevedra, Spain

- Casa Consistorial de Pontevedra
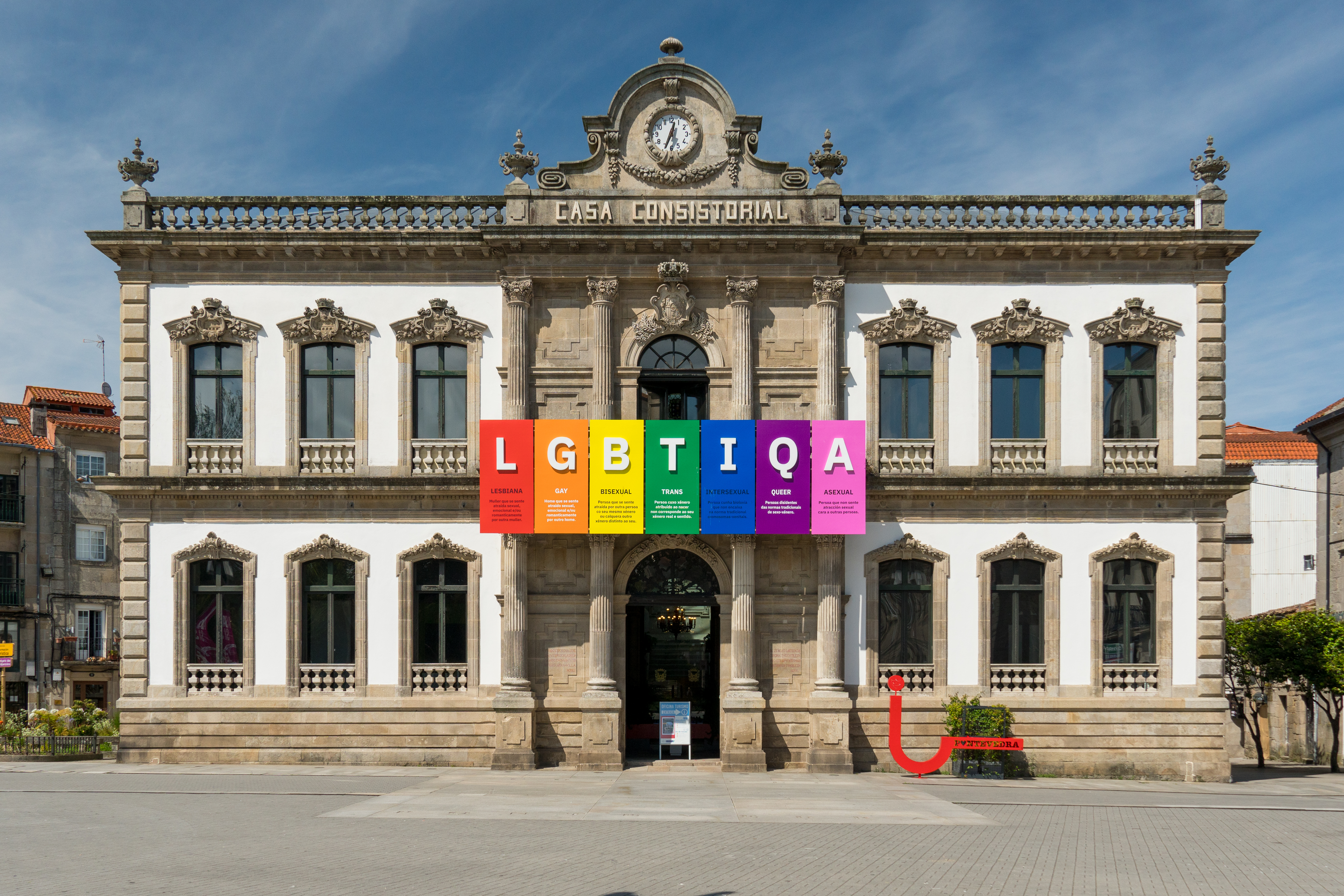
- Main façade in 2021.
- Interactive map of the Pontevedra City Hall area

General information
- Type: City Hall
- Location: Pontevedra, Galicia, Spain
- Coordinates: 42°25′55.3″N 8°38′48.8″W
- Construction started: 1877
- Completed: 1880
- Opening: 1880
- Owner: City Council of Pontevedra
- Operator: City Council of Pontevedra

Technical details
- Floor count: 2

Design and construction
- Architect: Alejandro Sesmero

Website
- pontevedra.gal

The Pontevedra City Hall in Pontevedra, Spain, is the seat of the city council of this Galician city. It is located at the eastern end of the Alameda de Pontevedra, on the edge of the old town. To the west it opens onto the pedestrian España Square.

== History ==
In 1875, the idea of building a new headquarters for the Town Hall was born, located on the land occupied by the Bastida Grande, a bastion of the Pontevedra walls next to the Saint Dominic's gateway, which was also used as the town hall since 1595 and whose facade opened onto the old town. In 1876 it was decided to demolish the old building and the Pontevedra City Council approved the plans presented by the architect Alejandro Sesmero. During the work, the Town Hall was moved to the Casa del Barón, the palace of the Counts of Maceda.

The foundation stone of the building was laid on 10 October 1877 and the work continued until the last stone was laid on 25 July 1879. The work was completely finished on 3 August 1880 and the building was inaugurated on 24 August 1880. The new town hall opened onto the Alameda and the new middle-class neighbourhood created by the demolition of the city walls in 1855. The construction of other large buildings such as the Provincial Council Palace (Pontevedra Provincial Council), also by Sesmero, the Saint Ferdinand Barracks or the Valle-Inclán High School around the Alameda made this area the great leisure space for the city's bourgeoisie. This work led to the architect being awarded the Cross of the Royal Order of Charles III in 1880.

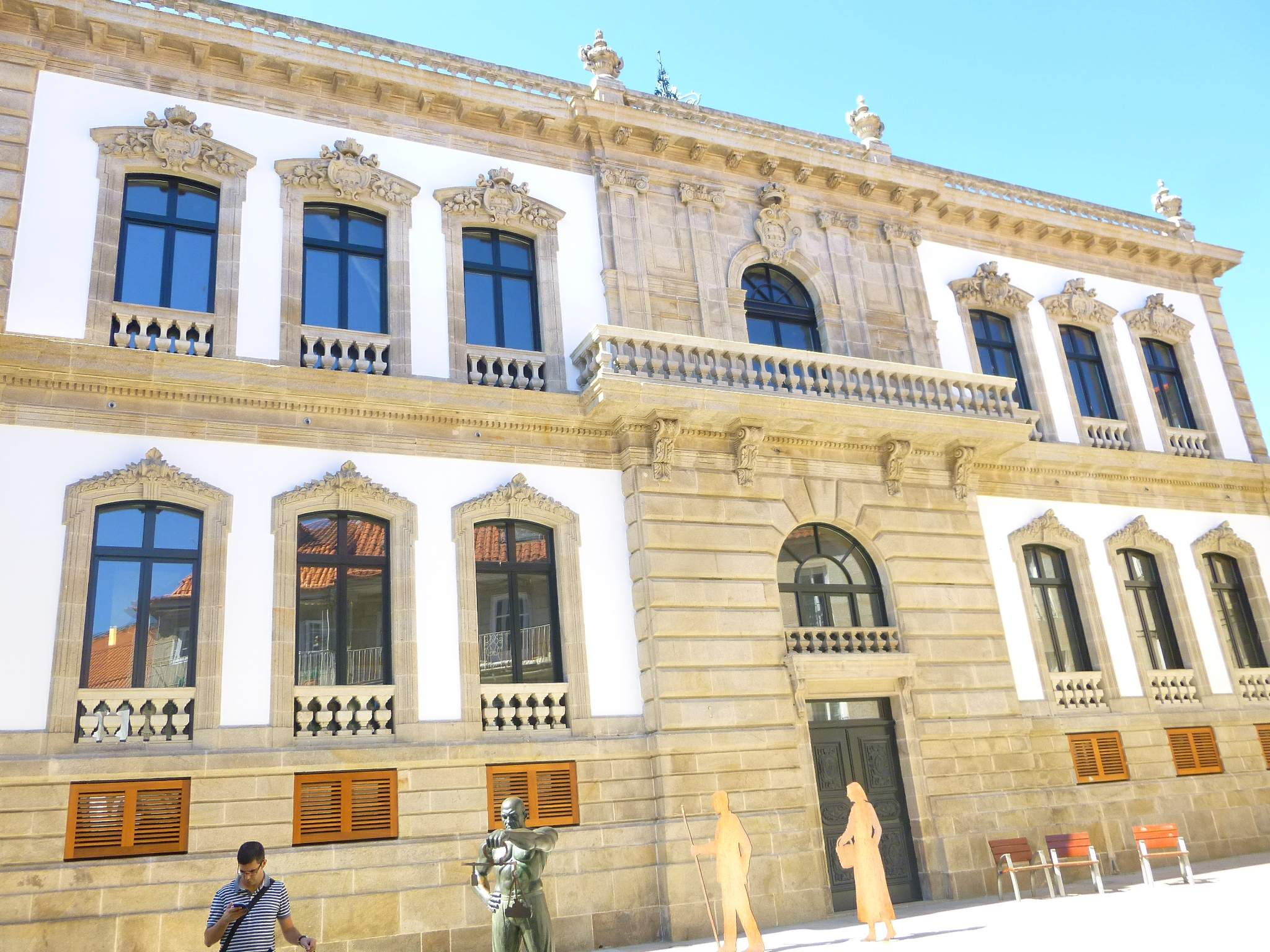
Rear façade of the town hall

In 1944, a half-basement was built to extend the building as well as an imperial staircase overlooking the building's courtyard, slightly raising the ground floor level. The original cast-iron staircase had a cast-iron banister and two flights that were unified in a central landing.

In 2009, the building was renovated, recovering elements of its original architecture. In 2012 and 2013, more extensive renovations were undertaken. The roof has been restored to its original zinc finish. During this renovation work, the original iron skylight of the building, which in 1953 had been hidden behind a Stained glass window with the coat of arms of the province of Pontevedra, was found.

On 7 July 2022, work began on the complete renovation of the building. A lift has been installed on the left side to improve accessibility and the entrance from Alhóndiga Street has been turned into the main entrance to the ground floor offices. When the building was built in the 19th century, the life of the city took place within the city walls, and the usual access to the City Hall was through Alhóndiga Street. The entrance from the Plaza de España was reserved for institutional events that took place on the first floor ( municipal councils, weddings or civil baptisms, speeches, reception of the Three Kings...).

== Description ==
The building belongs to the eclectic style that prevailed at the end of the 19th century with elements and concepts inspired by French architecture. The Town Hall was one of Alejandro Sesmero's first major projects, setting many of the guidelines for what would be his style, an eclecticism with a French flavour, giving the severity required by a public building, while its refined decoration underlines the building's political-administrative significance.

Sesmero inserted a small Parisian palace in the Second Empire style into the city. In fact, as the historian Jesús Ángel Sánchez García discovered, he partially plagiarised the design of the rear façade and interior of a mansion (the hôtel particulier Murat (1850-1864), demolished in 1961, having belonged to Prince Murat and before that to Cécile Furtado-Heine) at number 8 of the former Parisian street of Valois-du-Roule (joined to the street of Monceau in 1868, the mansion was located at number 28) designed by the architects François-Joseph Nolau and Édouard-Emmanuel Convents, adapting it to the required institutional function with the inclusion of the city's coat of arms, the main balcony and the clock at the top.

The building is a balanced ensemble with large Ionic (ground floor) and Corinthian (upper floor) columns that highlight its central part. The entrance door has a semicircular arch decorated with a crown of oak leaves, symbolising strength, and the windows are decorated with the city's coat of arms. The columns that frame the entrance are on a large raised pedestal and are crowned by highly decorated Ionic or Roman Corinthian capitals. Sesmero replaces the acanthus with vegetation (leaves, fruit) hanging from the column. The balustrade at the top contains four Kraters at the corners. The intercolumniation of the central body is wide and richly decorated. The columns have fluted shafts. The parapets of all the windows have balustrades.

The interior has a central staircase in the Empire style. The gallery that surrounds the staircase with wide openings, leaded glass windows and the skylight that covers it is particularly noteworthy. After the renovation tendered in 2021, the ground floor from which the staircase starts is a hall and an open-plan space with the offices. The upper floor, or main floor, consists of a meeting room occupying the entire length of the façade of the Plaza de España, and a room for institutional receptions, an office for the mayor and other auxiliary spaces overlooking the Alhóndiga street, as well as an interior space designed as a waiting room. The semi-basement is used for multi-purpose rooms. The entrance on Alhóndiga Street is also being refurbished as the main entrance to the building.

On the façade of the city hall there is a 16th century inscription from the old town hall on the legend of the Greek archer Teucer, the mythical founder of the town.

FVNDOTE TEVCRO VALIENTE
DE AQVESTE RIO EN LA ORILLA
PARA QUE EN ESPAÑA FVESES
DE VILLAS LA MARAVILLA
DEL ZEBEDEO LA ESPADA
CORONA TU GENTILEZA
VN CASTILLO PVENTE Y MAR
ES TIMBRE DE TV NOBLEZA

Teucer, the valiant, founded you
on the banks of this river,
so that of Spain you may be
the most beautiful city,
the sword of Zebedee
crown your kindness;
a castle, a bridge, the sea
which is your proof of nobility.

== Gallery ==
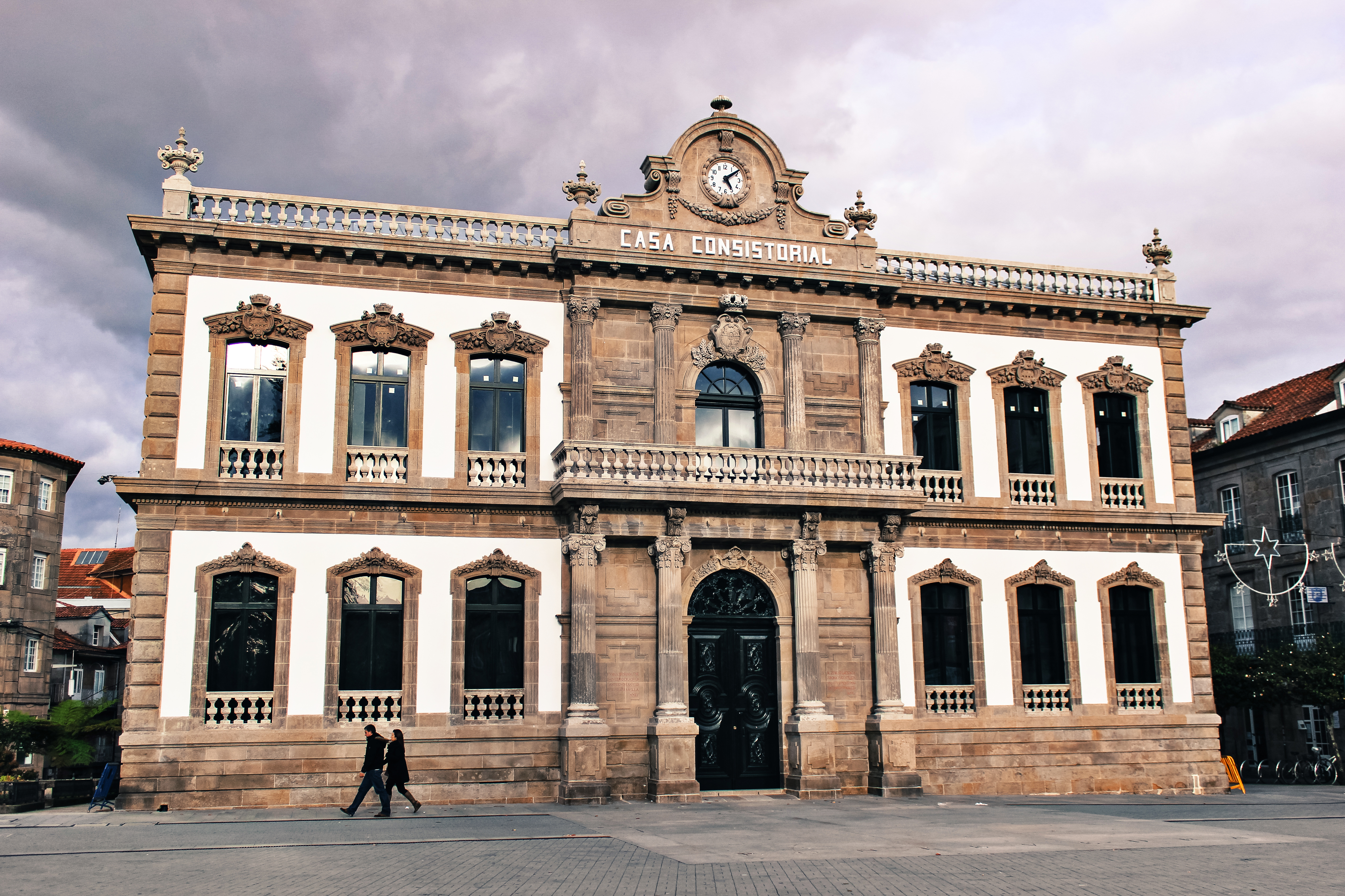
Pontevedra City Hall

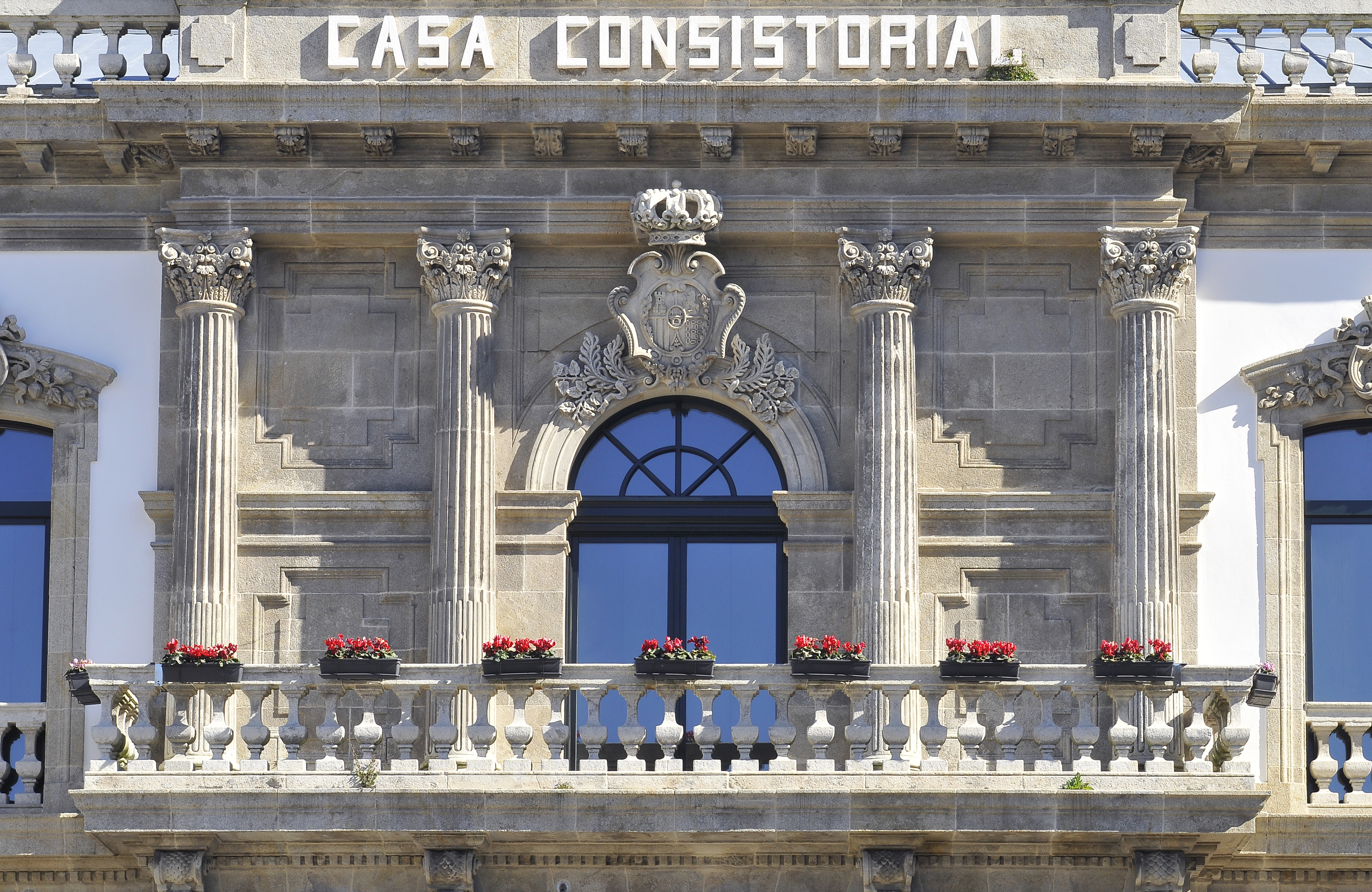
Main façade balcony and Corinthian columns

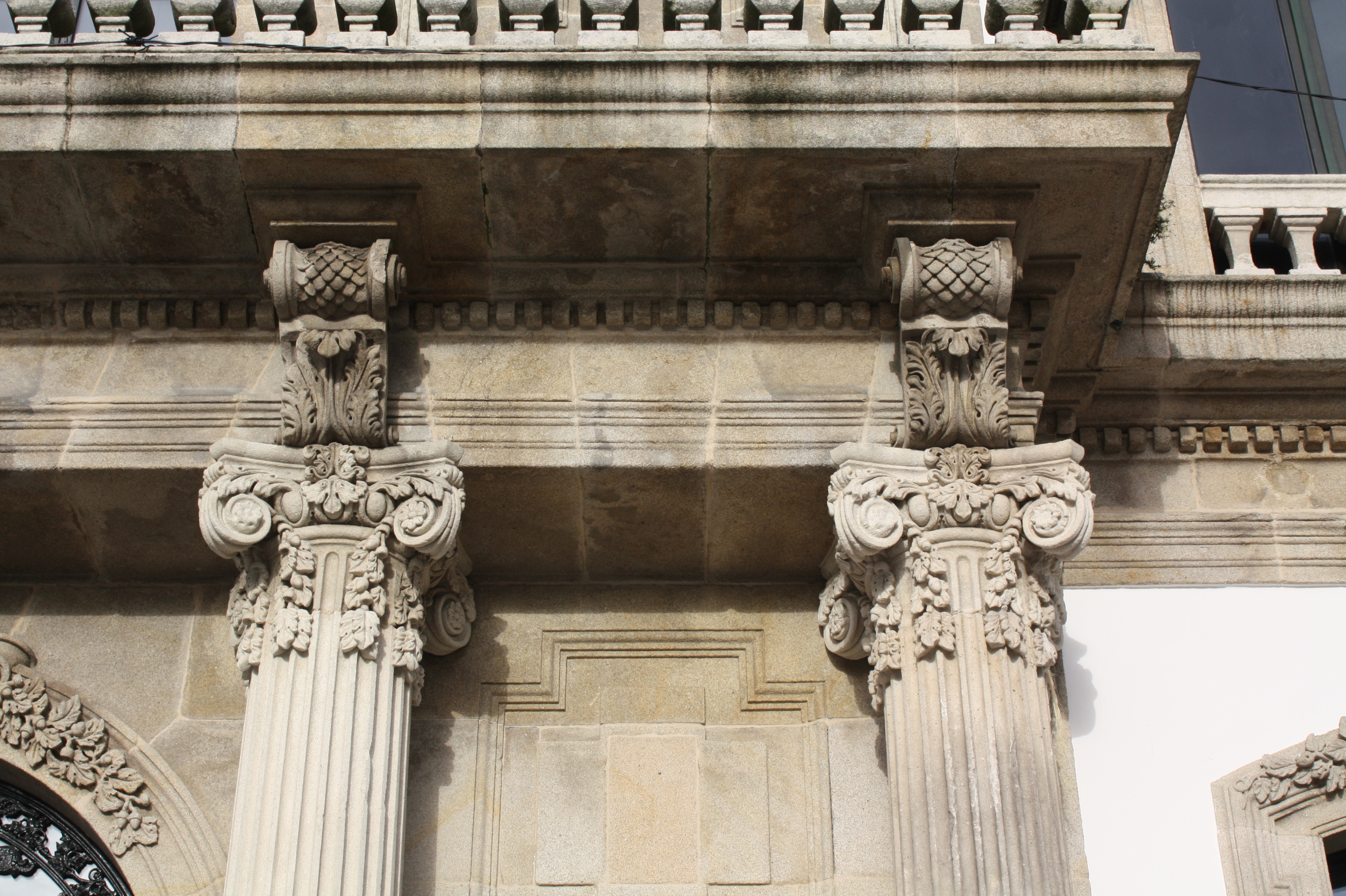
Corinthian capitals

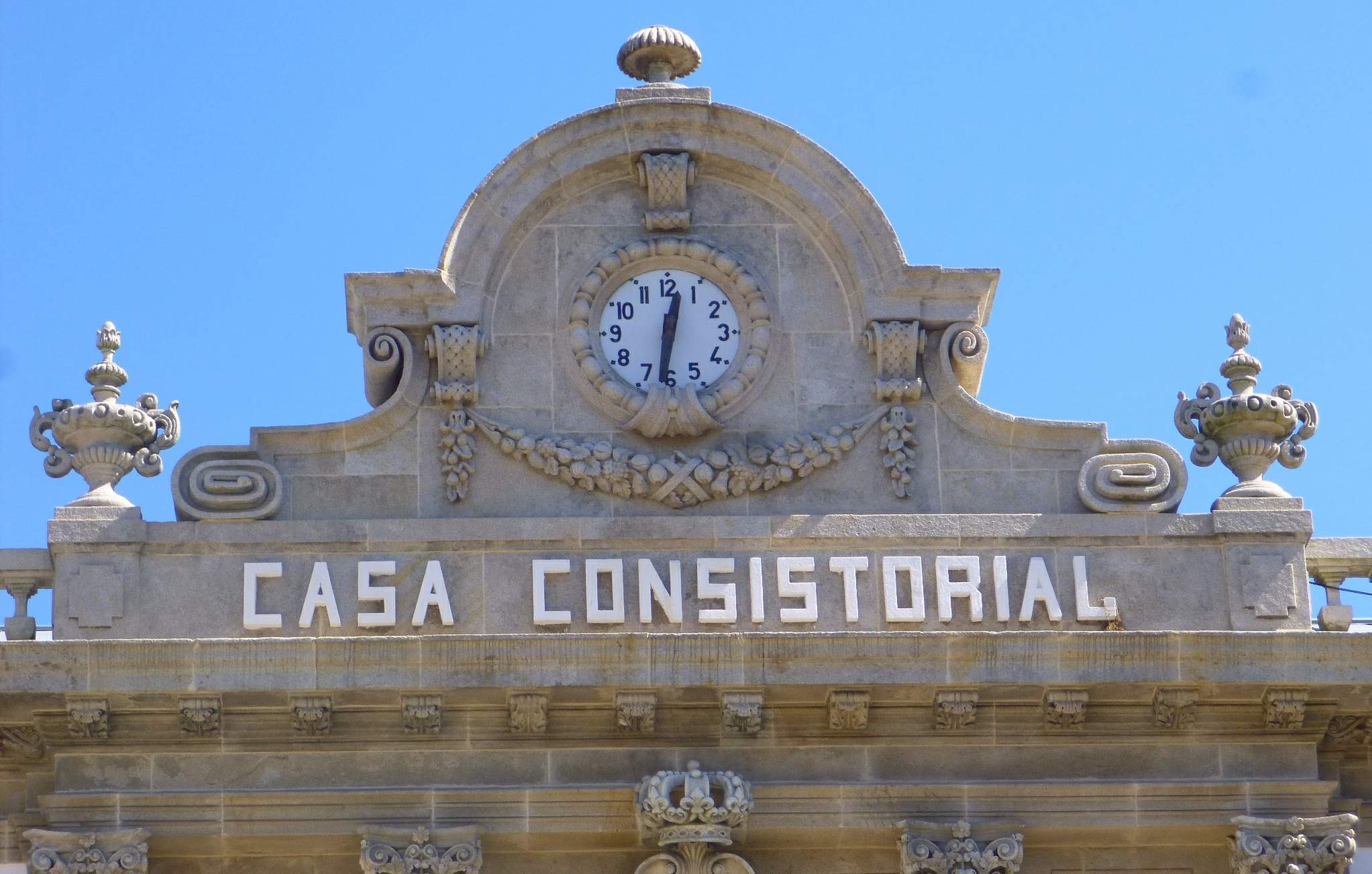
Clock on top of the façade

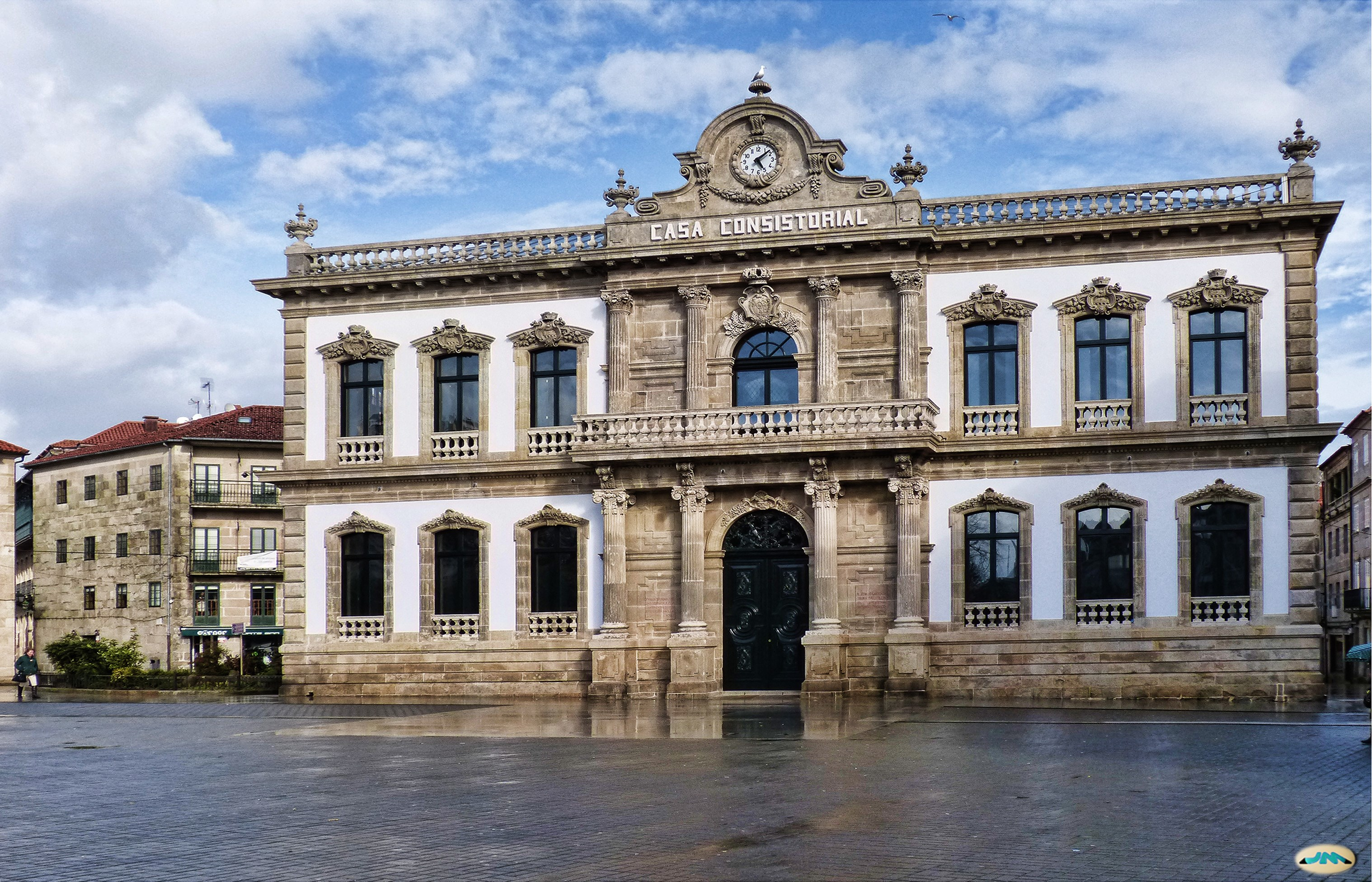
Main facade

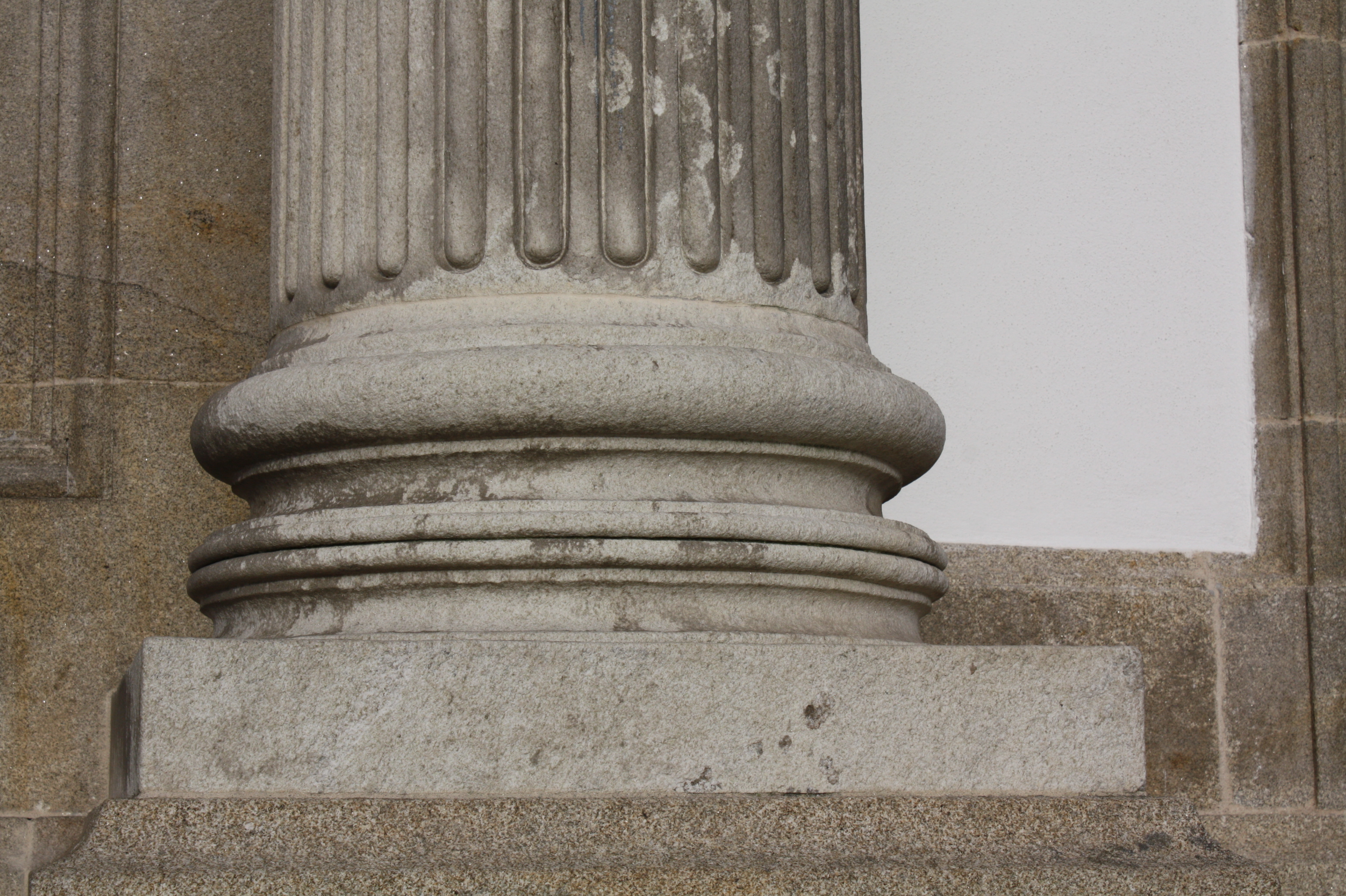
Base of the columns of the main façade.

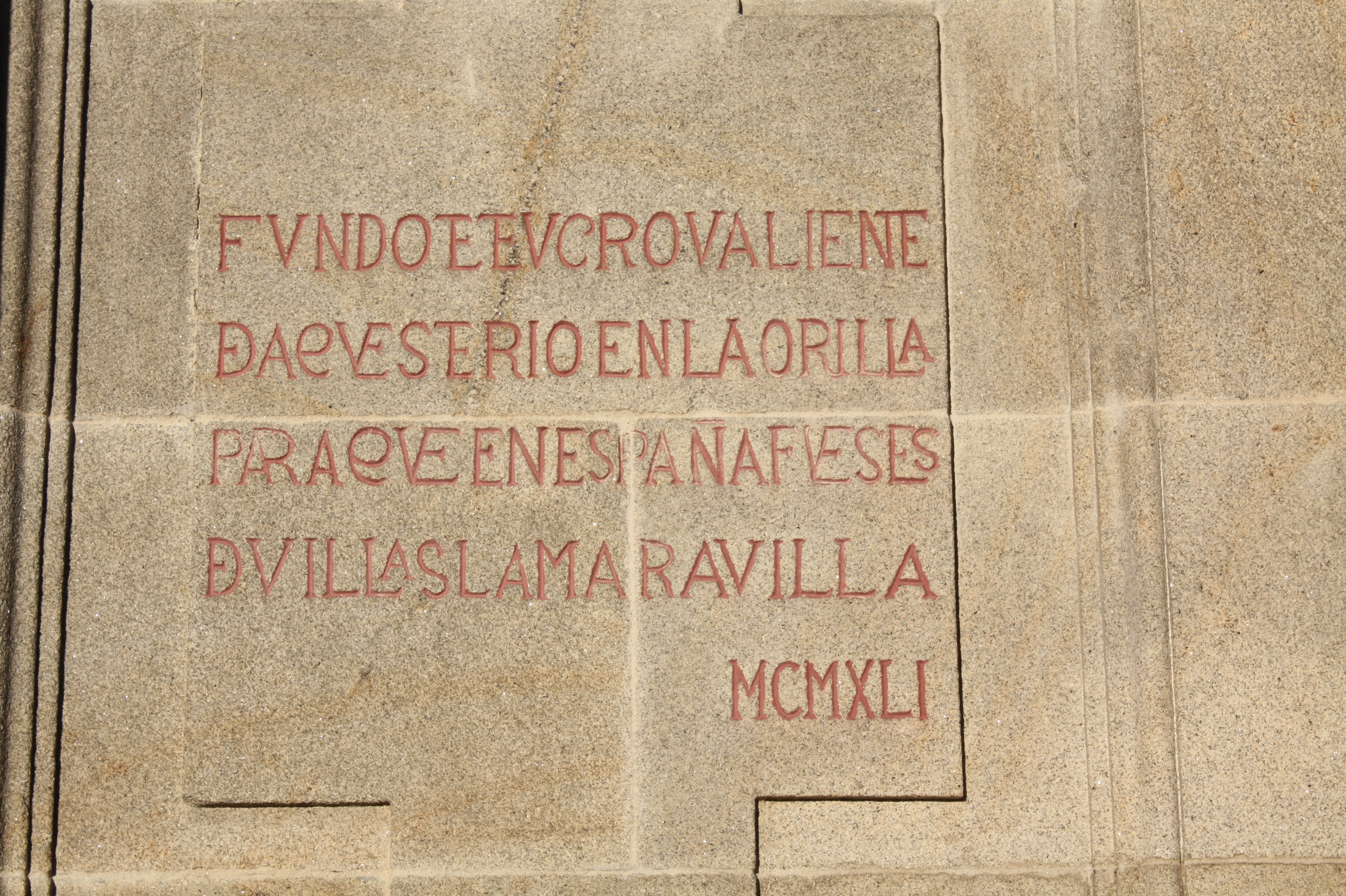
Inscription on the façade

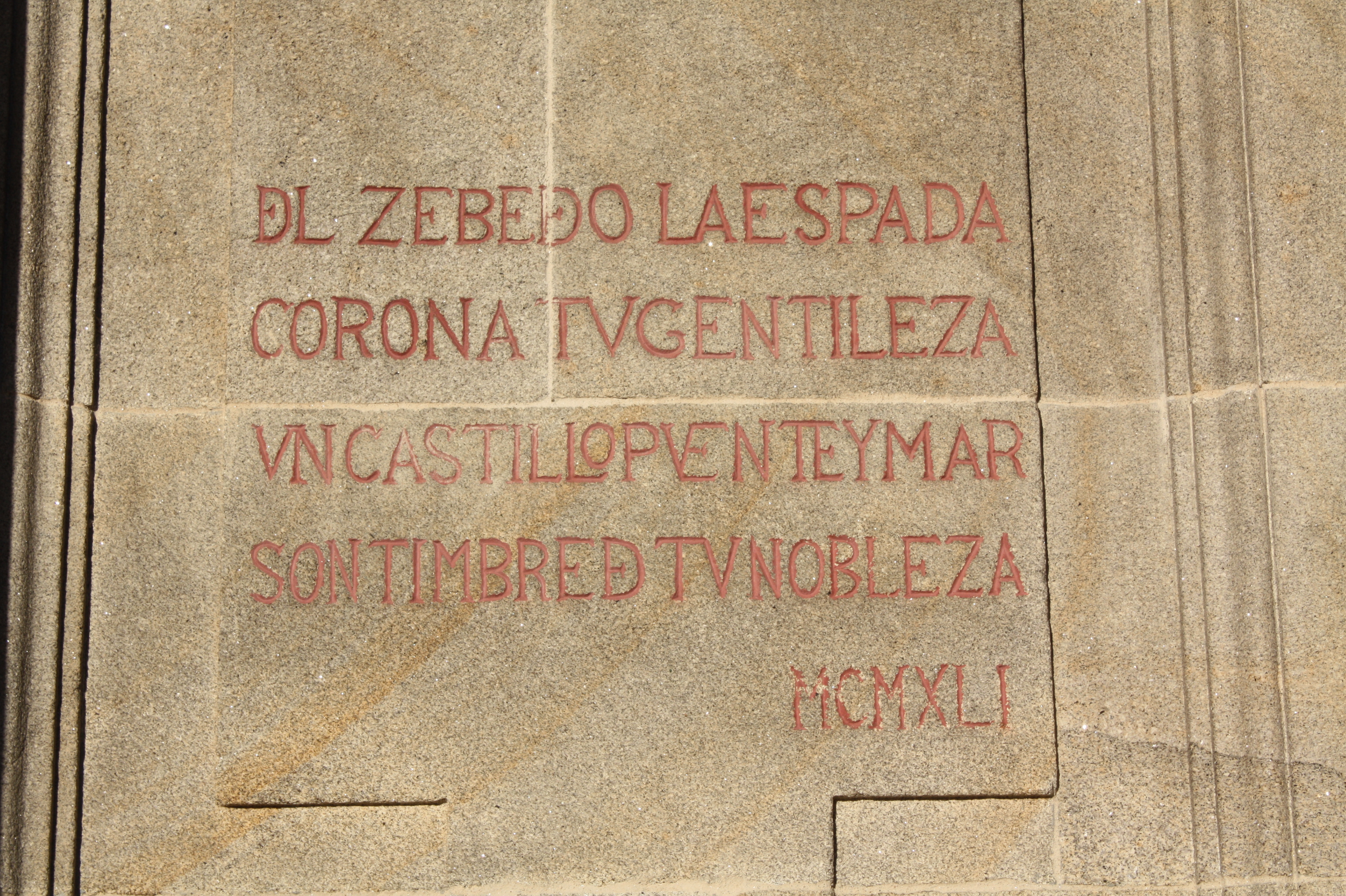
Inscription on the façade (continued).

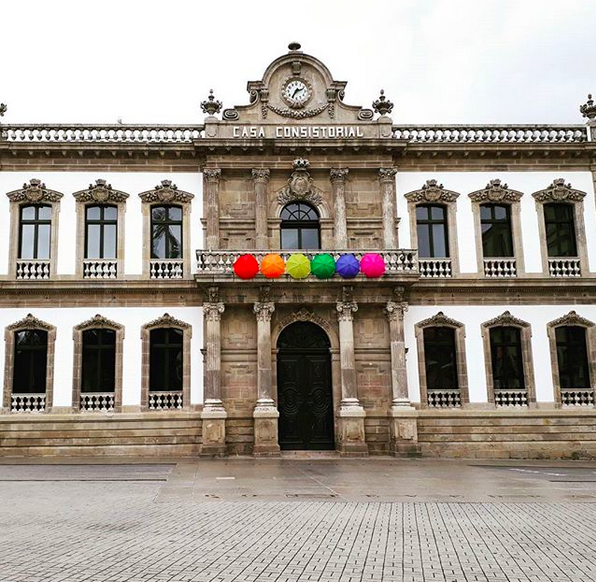
City Hall in 2018.

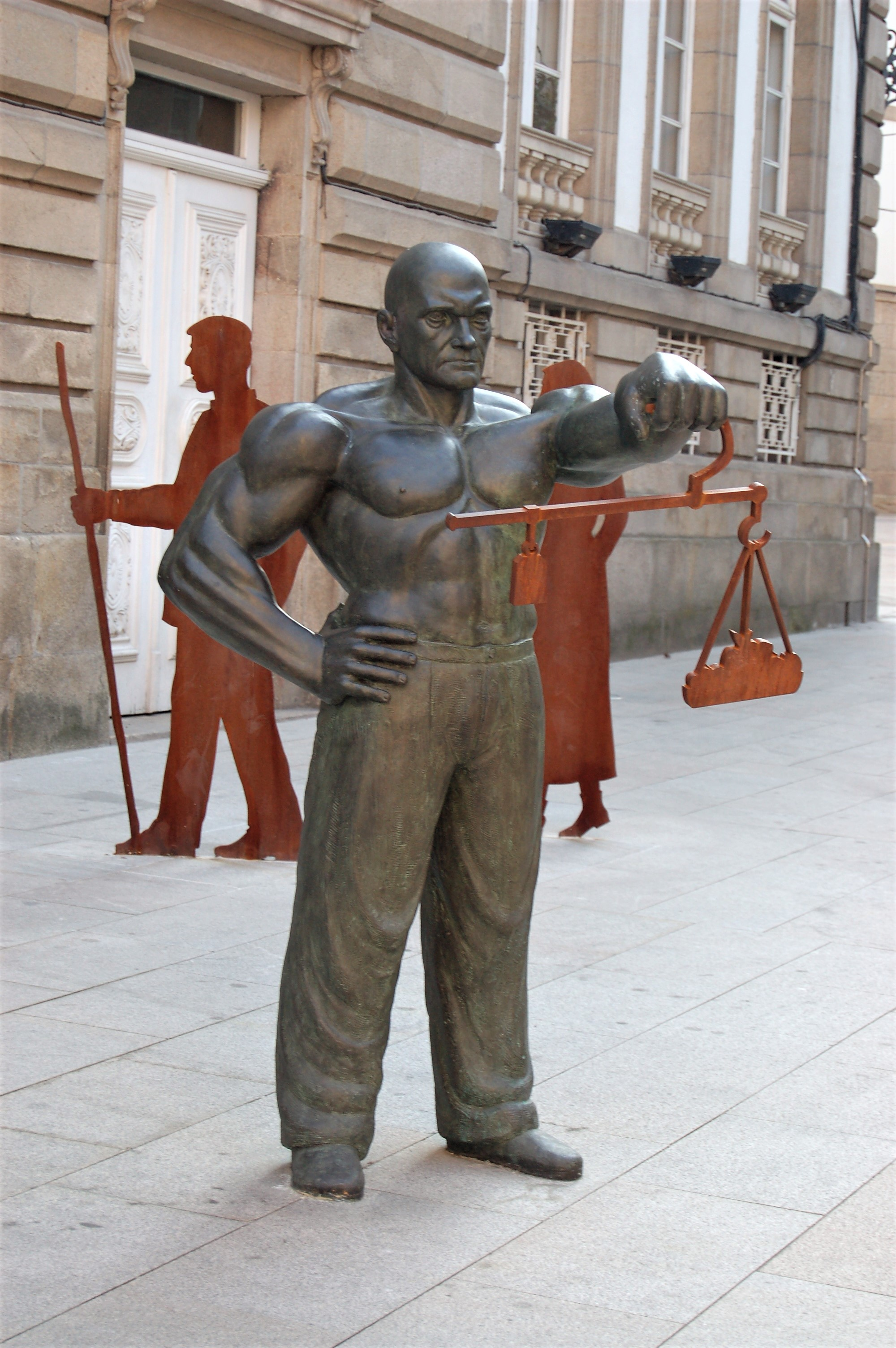
The Fiel contraste behind the town hall.

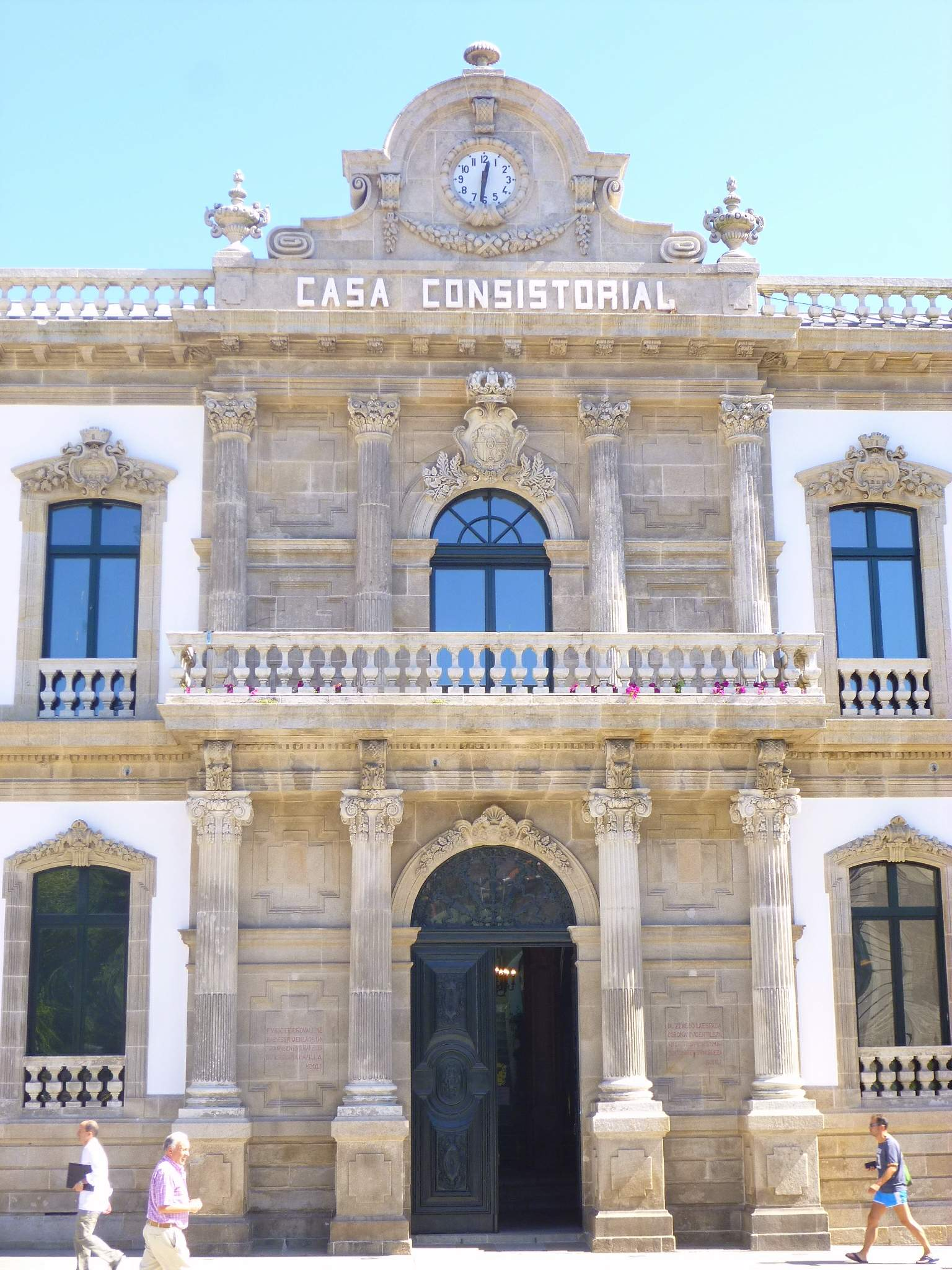
Central part of the façade

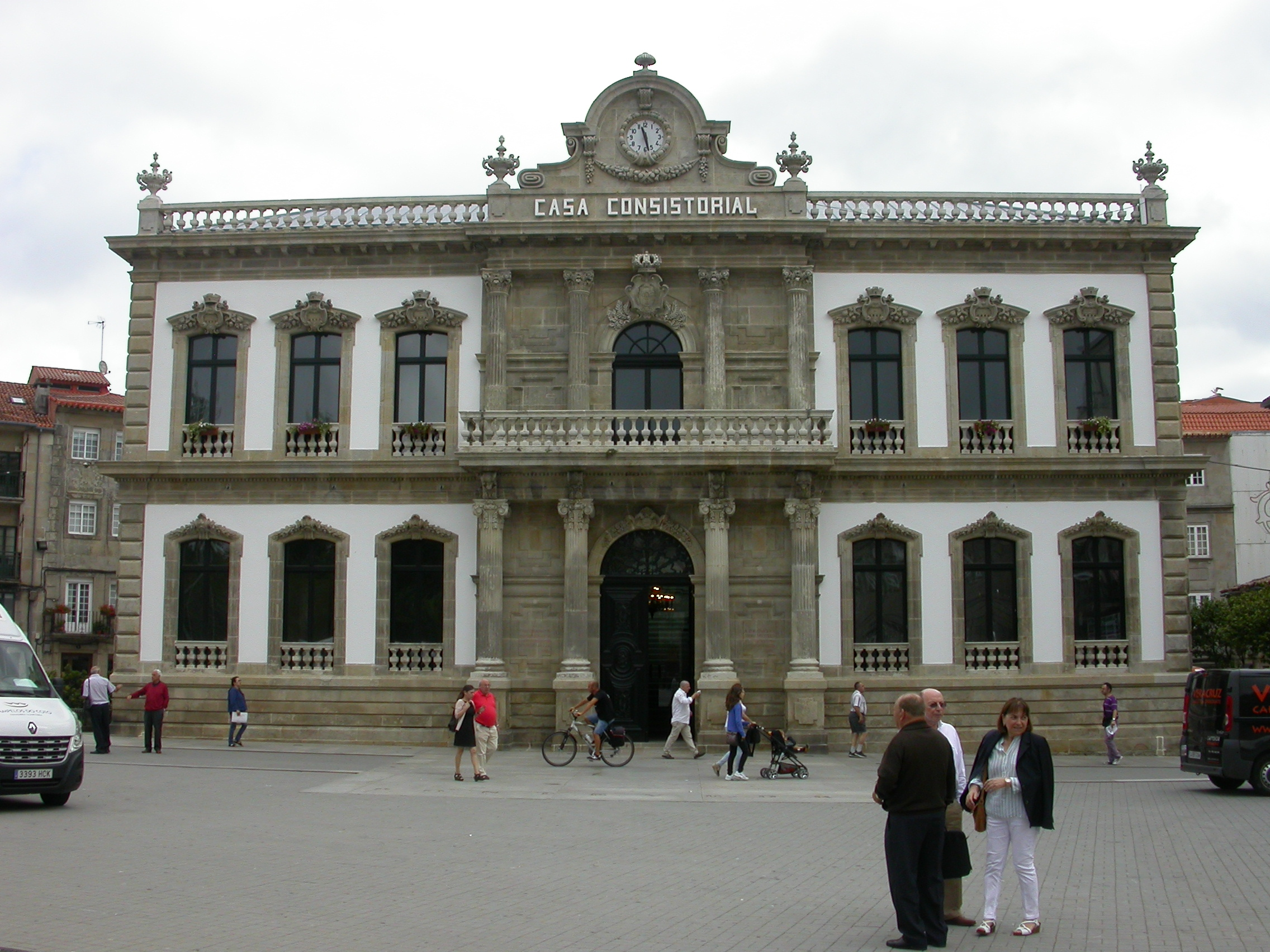
Façade opening onto the Place of Spain

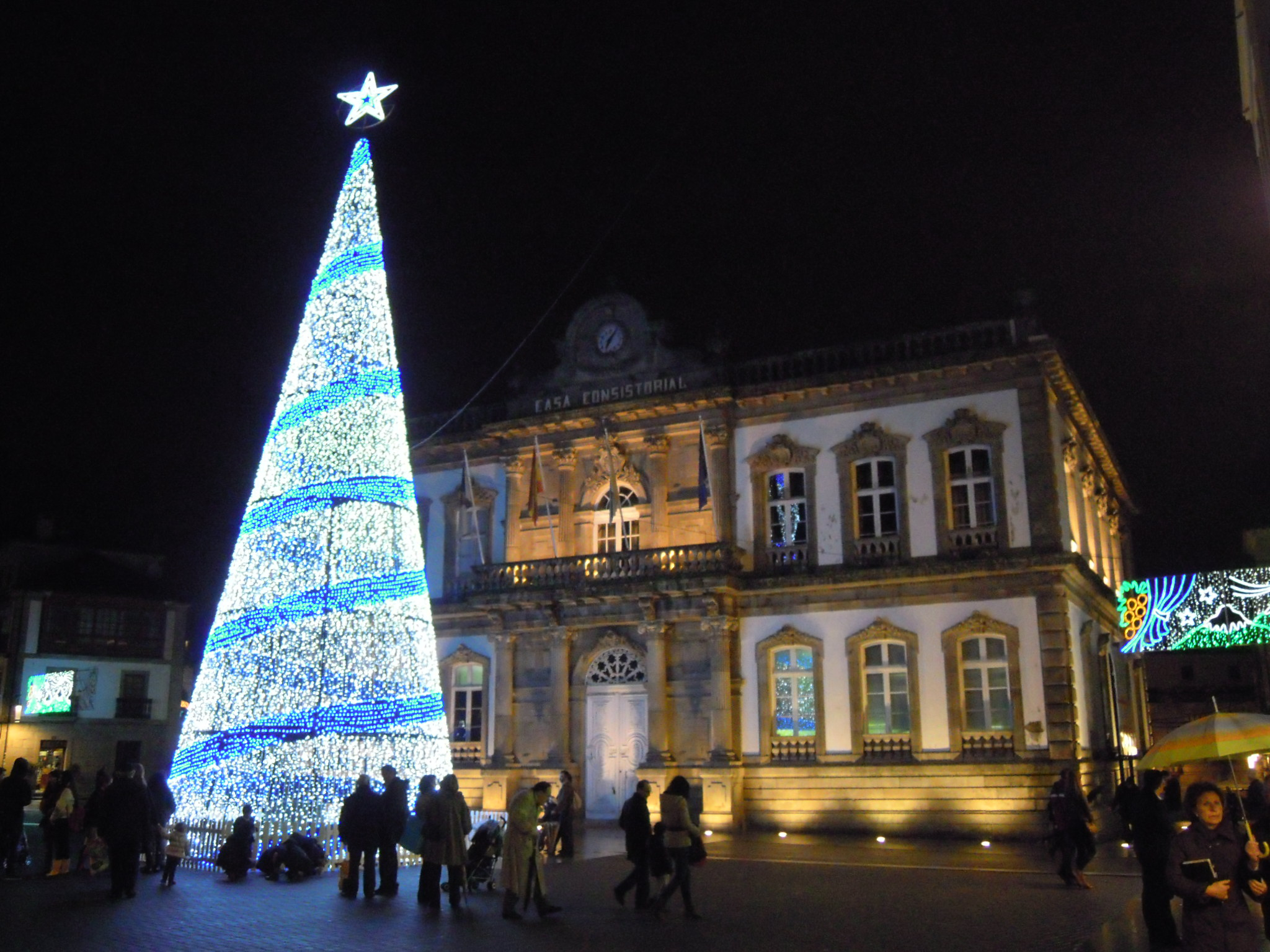
City Hall at Christmas.

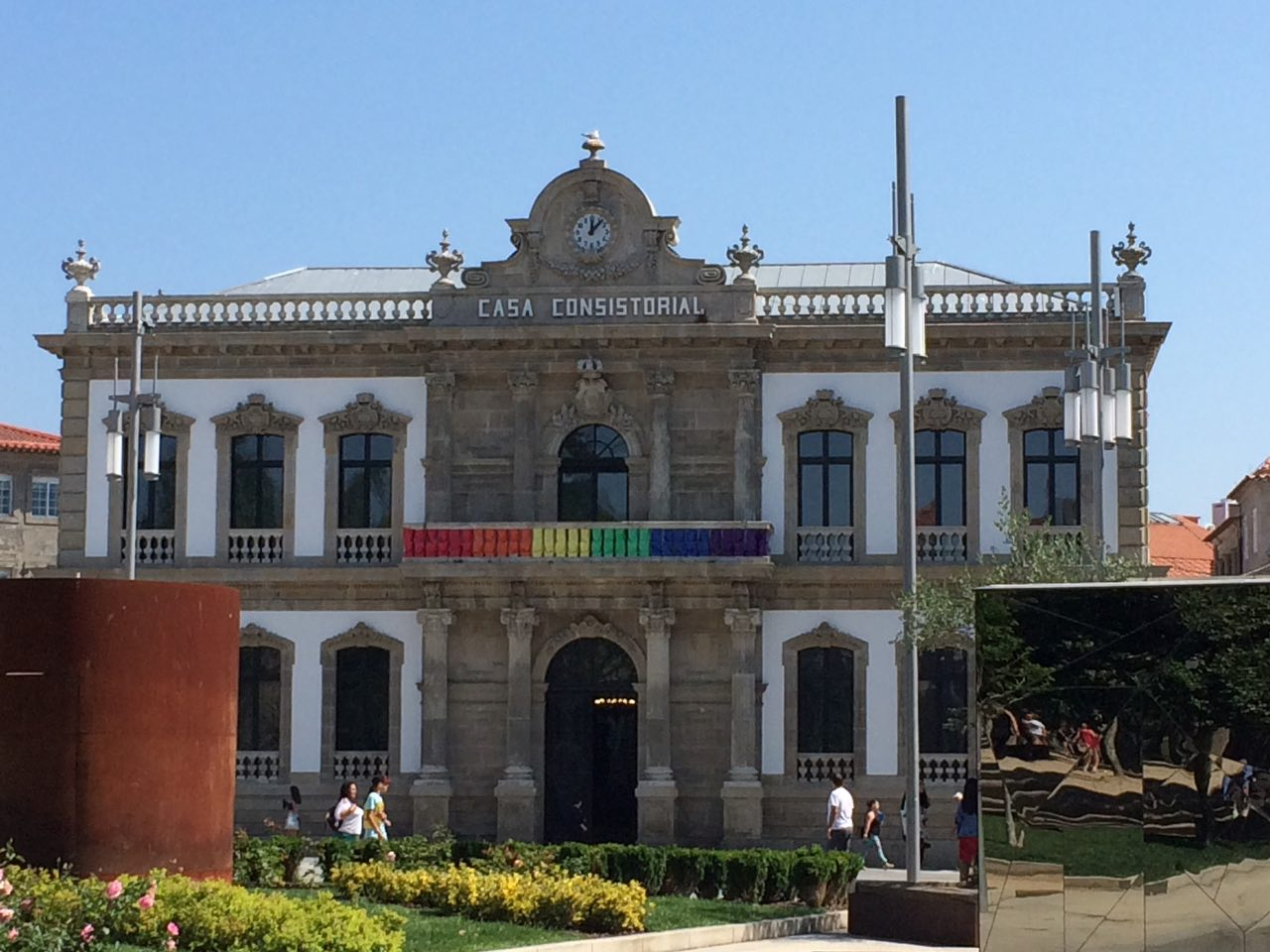
City Hall in 2015

== See also ==
=== Bibliography ===
- Fernández Fernández, Xosé, "Casa do Concello de Pontevedra", in Boletín Académico de la ETSA (Escuela Técnica Superior de Arquitectura), No. 15, La Coruña, 1992.
- Fontoira Surís, Rafael, 2009. "Pontevedra Monumental". Ed. Deputación de Pontevedra. Pontevedra. ISBN 978-84-8457-327-2.
- Rincón García, Wifredo, 1993. "Ayuntamientos de España". Espasa-Calpe. Madrid. ISBN 978-8423952793.
- Sánchez García, Jesús Ángel: La recepción de modelos franceses en la Arquitectura ecléctica: Alejandro Rodríguez-Sesmero y el proyecto del Ayuntamiento de Pontevedra (1876). Espacio, tiempo y forma. Serie VII, Historia del arte, ISSN 1130-4715, No 13, 2000, pages 361–400.

=== Related articles ===
- Plaza de España (Pontevedra)
- Alameda de Pontevedra
- Mansion of the Marquis of Riestra

=== External links ===
- Pontevedra City Hall
- Casa Consistorial de Pontevedra
- La recepción de modelos franceses en la Arquitectura ecléctica: Alejandro Rodríguez-Sesmero y el proyecto del Ayuntamiento de Pontevedra (1876)
- Casa do concello de Pontevedra
