= José Rivas Fontán =

Spanish politician

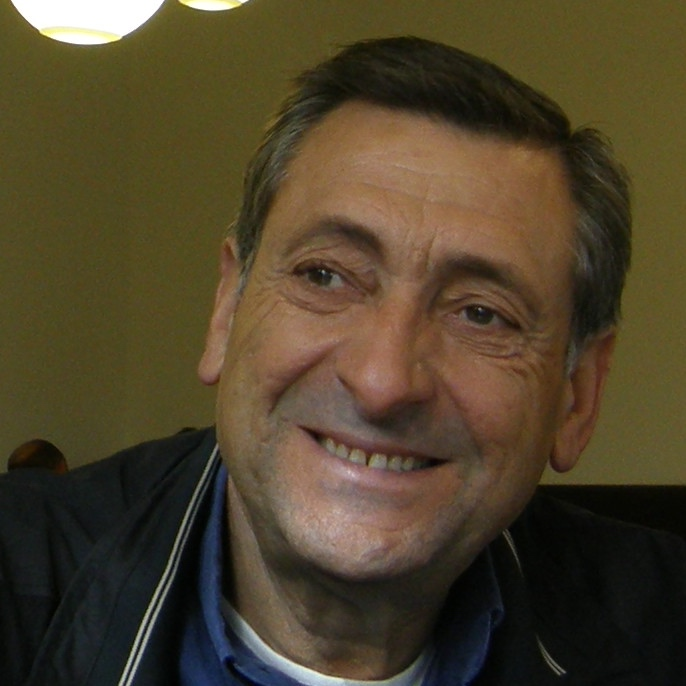
José Rivas Fontán in 2008

José Rivas Fontán (born 31 August 1941) is a Spanish politician and teacher who was the Mayor of Pontevedra between 1979 and 1991. He withdrew from public activity in 2004 and is currently retired.

== Biography ==
=== Family ===
José Rivas Fontán was born on 31 August 1941 in Xeve parish in the Pontevedra municipality, Spain. He is the son of Paulino Rivas Maquieira and Elvira Fontán Fontán and was the youngest of three brothers. In 1965, he married Mª Gloria Lis Corral. The couple had four children.

=== Education and early political career ===
Rivas Fontán grew up in a parish near the town of Pontevedra, where he attended a state primary school, starting at age six. He bicycled to secondary school, and later commuted eight kilometers by bicycle to a Teacher Training college in Pontevedra. He was stationed at the military headquarters in the capital during his compulsory military service. In 1963, he passed the state teachers' entry exam for adult education.

He sat a special exam, set up by the Ministry of Education, for the Organisation of School Services for education inspectors in Pontevedra. There, he launched one of the first applied audiovisual media teaching centres in Spain. In Pontevedra, he met Federico Cifuentes Pérez. Pérez became his boss and friend and, years later, would turn out to be an essential collaborator in the Pontevedra Teachers Movement (MMS).

In Pontevedra towards the end of the 1960s and beginning of the 1970s, the educational community began to question the educational system which, as much as was possible at that time, had a labour movement, the Spanish Teaching Service (SEM). The new tendency strove to change it, from within, into democratic unionism. This movement would later spread to all the Spanish provinces. This democratic organisation clashed with the political regime (Francisco Franco's dictatorship), and after many difficulties and risks, culminated in the “1st EGB Congress of Pontevedra” in 1977. The congress was attended by representatives from the whole of Spain as well as by the French "Fédération de l’éducation nationale" (FEN). Because of his work in the Education Inspectors Corps, José Rivas Fontán was familiar with the educational structure in his province and, together with other colleagues, organized this movement organically and territorially into democratically elected cells, with himself as the first Provincial Secretary of the Association. At that time, the Pontevedra Teachers Association published the only issue of the newspaper TEUCRO. After the newspaper had already been sent to all the provinces, it was censored.

=== Political life ===
==== Constituent process ====
On 15 June 1977, there was a free general election in Spain for the first time since 1931. José Rivas was elected to the Spanish Parliament as Deputy for Pontevedra, as a member of the UCD Party. He became a member of the UCD Political Council.

In 1978, he was General Secretary of the Galician Junta's pre-autonomous government under the presidency of Antonio Rosón Pérez. He was Secretary of the Galician Parliamentary Assembly which comprised all elected MPs as well as the senators chosen by the Crown, the Nobel Prize winner Camilo José Cela and Domingo García Sabell. He was constituent Secretary of the 16 Commissions created to draw up the Galician Statutes.

==== Mayor of Pontevedra ====
In 1979, he was elected Mayor of Pontevedra for UCD for a 4-year term, then re-elected as an independent candidate for AP and, finally, in 1987, a member of the Independent Galician Party until 1991.

Due to a prolonged persecution by the Head Judge of Number 3 Court in Pontevedra (Luciano Varela), Rivas Fontán left politics, and did not run again in 1991. Rivas denounced the Head Judge to the General Judicial Council and the Ombudsman. After having been tried and judged for anonymous allegations on various occasions, Rivas was acquitted on all counts by the Provincial Court of Pontevedra and the Supreme Court in Madrid.

==== Latter activities ====
Rivas Fontán was the spokesperson for the Provincial Museum of Pontevedra Trust from 1979 to 1983. In 1980, he was elected vice-president of the Spanish Federation of Municipalities and Provinces (FEMP). He was spokesperson for the Executive Commission of the Supreme Sports Council representing town councils and for their Board of Directors. In 1983, he was a member of the Directive Committee of the European Council of Municipalities based in Paris. He was in the Spanish Delegation at the European Council's Regional Powers Conference in Strasbourg, France. In 1985, the Ministry of Public Administration (Ministry and FEMP) set up a National Commission to study the upcoming Local Regimen Law, of which he was vice-president. In 1986, he was appointed a trustee of the Alfredo Brañas Cultural Foundation in Santiago de Compostela. He withdrew from political activity between 1991 and 1996.

==== Return to politics ====
In 1996 and 2000, he was re-elected as an MP in the 6th and 7th legislatures, acting as a member of Commissions for Education, Public Administration, Infrastructure and Defence. As a member of the latter, he was in the Security Commission of the NATO Parliamentary Assembly, attending meetings held in various countries around the world (USA, Germany, Russia, Norway, Slovakia, Macedonia, Lithuania, Latvia, Turkey, Uzbekistan, etc.).

== Public appearances and positions ==
- Spoke at the Caracas Galician Brotherhood on the theme of the poet Luis Amado Carballo, from Pontevedra
- Formed part of the Commission on Self-Government in the Spanish Senate, studying the upcoming Local Regimen Law
- Lectured on the new Local Regimen Law for summer courses held at the International University Menéndez Pelayo in Santander
- Appeared on the TV programme La Clave, hosted by José Luis Balbín, along with other Spanish mayors
- Advocated for the abolition of the death penalty during the drafting of the Spanish constitution (1978)
- Presented a book talk, “Just Rivas Fontán. Memoirs of a politician far from the flock” at the Municipal Theatre in Pontevedra

== Recognitions and awards ==
- Member of the Constitutional Order of Merit, with the honours, distinctions and use of insignia corresponding to the Order's regulations, for his relevant activities serving the Constitution
- Gold Medal and member of the Order of Diego de Losada, Republic of Venezuela
- Gold Medal from the town council of Lepanto, Greece

== Other qualifications ==
- Expert in National Defence from Rey Juan Carlos University.
- Honours graduate in Latin American military co-operation, Rey Juan Carlos University.

== See also ==
=== Bibliography ===
- Roberto Taboada Rivadulla (R. Taboada). 30 años de corporaciones municipales. Pontevedra (España): 2010. [ISBN 978-84-613-9475-3].
- Graciano Palomo (Ediciones Martínez Roca, S.A.). Rumbo a lo desconocido. Historia secreta de los años más convulsos del PP. Madrid (España): 2008. [ISBN 978-84-270-3448-8].
- Adrián Rodríguez (alvarellos EDITORA). "Solo Rivas Fontán. Memorias de un político lejos del rebaño". Santiago de Compostela (España): 2016. [ISBN 978-84-16460-07-6].

=== External links ===
- El 23-F muchos de mis concejales escaparon y otros se protegieron en casas de la derecha. Faro de Vigo (23/02/2011)
- A la Caza de la Noticia - Pontevedra 1980 Sprinter y Rivas Fontan. Programa "Vivir cada día: A la caza de la noticia" (1980)
- En 1983 un grupo político superó la barrera de los 13 concejales. La Voz de Galicia (19/04/2011)
- Un hombre derecho. El Mundo (22/03/2014)
- Rivas Fontán al teléfono. Diario de Pontevedra (22/05/2015)
- "La liberación de un triple exalcalde abierto en canal”. La Voz de Galicia (15/05/2016)
- "Rivas Fontán, por Adrián Rodríguez”. Diario de Pontevedra (15/05/2016)
- José Rivas Fontán: "La política es un mundo donde se utilizan las peores mañas" . Faro de Vigo (16/05/2016)
- Rivas Fontán: "Un libro para reflexionar" . Diario de Pontevedra (24/05/2016)
- Rivas Fontán: "Una vida dedicada a la política" . «Vía V»(cap.1070-parte1) (07/07/2016)
