= Miguel Anxo Fernández Lores =

Spanish politician

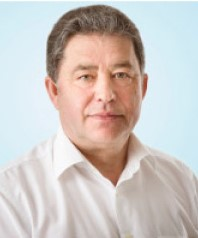

Mayor of Pontevedra
- Incumbent
- Assumed office July 14, 1999
- Preceded by: Juan Luis Pedrosa

Personal details
- Born: Miguel Ángel Fernández Lores; June 7, 1954 (age 72) Vilalonga Sanxenxo, Galicia, Spain
- Party: BNG
- Children: 4
- Education: University of Santiago de Compostela
- Occupation: Mayor
- Profession: Physician

Miguel Anxo Fernández Lores (born 7 June 1954) is a Spanish medical doctor and since July 1999, the current mayor of Pontevedra, representing Galician Nationalist Bloc (BNG).

== See also ==
=== External links ===
- Miguel Anxo Fernández Lores
