= Plaza de España (Pontevedra) =

Square in Pontevedra, Spain

España square
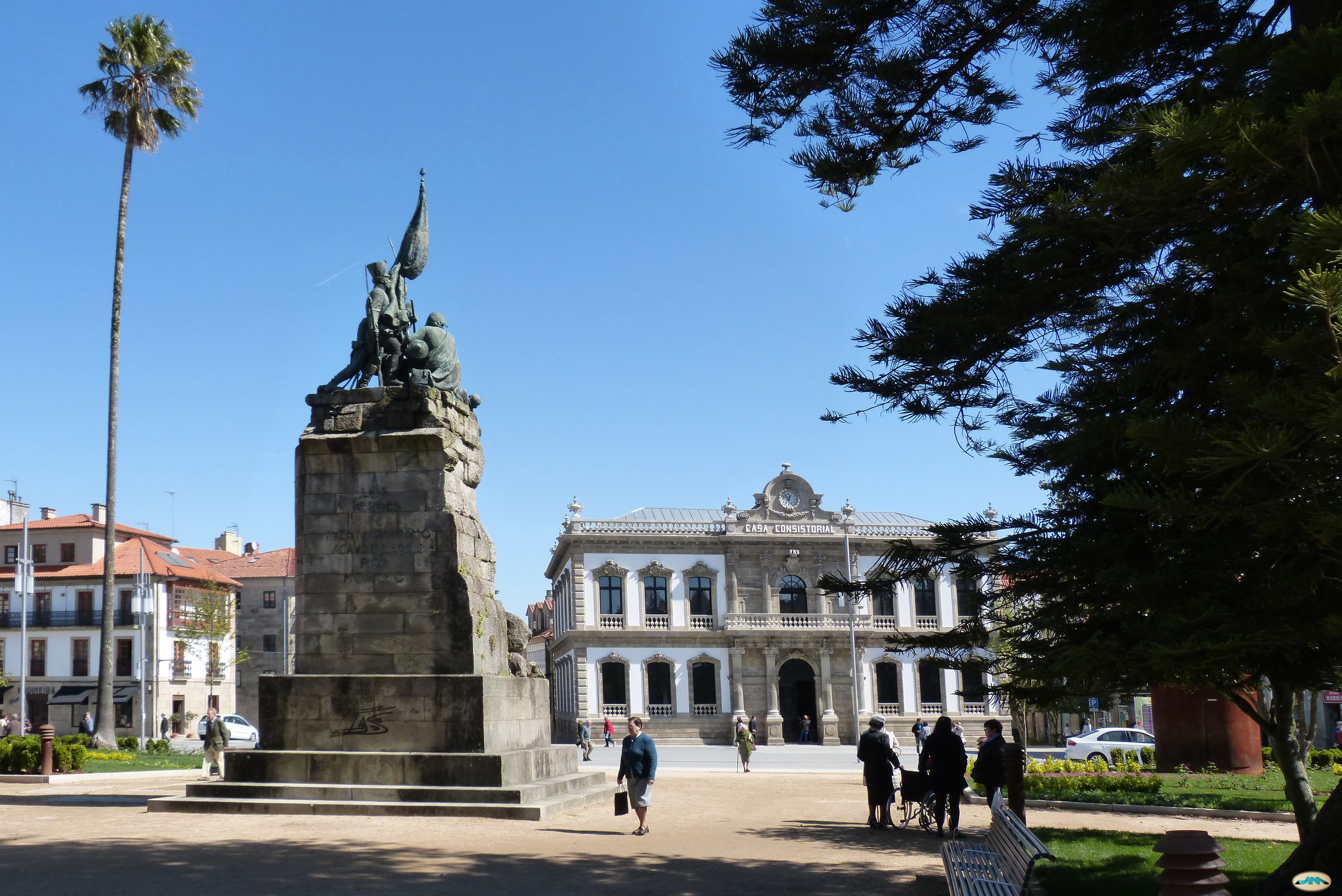
- España square
- Native name: Plaza de España (Spanish)
- Type: plaza
- Maintained by: Pontevedra City Council
- Location: Pontevedra, Spain
- Postal code: 36002
- Coordinates: 42.431889°N 8.647139°W

The Plaza de España is a 19th century pedestrian square located in the city centre of Pontevedra (Spain), on the edge of the old town and the Alameda de Pontevedra.

== Origin of the name ==
The square owes its name to the fact that it is the seat of the city's most important political institutions and its central hub.

== History ==
The Plaza de España was developed at the end of the 19th century following the line of the old medieval wall with the construction of the new City Hall as a transitional space between the historic centre and the Alameda de Pontevedra, which had been the former orchard of the Dominican convent and which the Dominicans transformed into a promenade in 1648 and which, in 1847, was closed off by stone walls. It was with the urban expansion at the end of the 19th century, which made the architect Alejandro Sesmero effective, that the process of forming the Alameda, and thus the Plaza de España, took shape within the framework of the city's bourgeois expansion. The extension and development of the Plaza de España was included in the project commissioned by the city council in 1880 to the architect Alejandro Sesmero for the planning and development of the Alameda.

The square itself soon became an important central space of the city, as it was the square of the city hall and other buildings of great institutional and political importance, such as the palace of the Provincial Council of Pontevedra, very close by. It was known as Plaza del Ayuntamiento (Town Hall Square). In August 1911 on the west side of the square, next to the Alameda, the monument to the heroes of Puente Sampayo, designed by Julio González-Pola y García to mark the first centenary of the battle of Ponte Sampaio against the French, was erected on the site of a small circular stone pond that had been removed. The statue was surrounded by a small garden enclosed by a small iron railing and remained so until the 1960s.

In the 1920s, the square became a transit point for the electric tram from Pontevedra to Marín, which went into service in December 1924 and passed in front of the town hall, and from 1943 for the trolleybus that replaced it. In 1936, the square was renamed Plaza de España, replacing the name Plaza de la República, which it had during the Second Republic. With the construction of the N-550 road linking A Coruña to the Portuguese border, the square became a place of passage for cars from the 1940s. With the growth of car traffic in the following decades, the square lost its original single-level configuration and a central vegetated median strip was created to separate the two directions of traffic.

In 1950, the construction of the new institutional building of the civil government of the province of Pontevedra was planned in the city, for which, following the recommendations of the Spanish State, the city of Pontevedra ceded an isolated rectangular plot of land to the northwest of the España square. According to official requirements, the building was to be constructed in the most dignified part of the city where the seats of the municipal (City Hall) and provincial (Pontevedra Provincial Council) authorities were to coexist in the same space. The building was inaugurated in 1958.

In the 1970s, the landscaping around the monument to the heroes of Puente Sampayo was extended and the wrought iron fence was removed. On 4 April 1983, the then president of the Xunta de Galicia, Gerardo Fernández Albor, inaugurated a multi-jet light fountain that surrounded the monument for years. In 2009 it was dismantled when work began on the square's new underground car park.

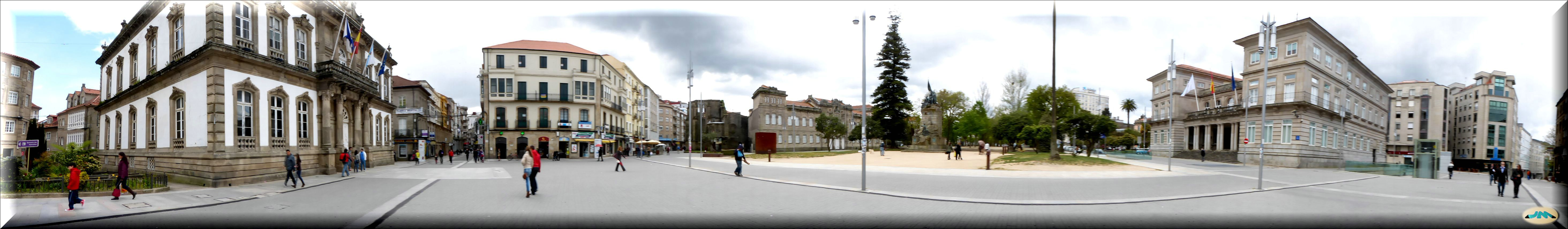
Panoramic view of the España square

The square has been completely refurbished, completely paved and surrounded by granite at both ends, thus recovering its unique platform and making it pedestrianised. On the north side of the square, at the end closest to Arzobispo Malvar Street, stone slabs were installed with the inscription Circunvalación, 4 metres long, recalling the first bypass of Pontevedra in the 16th century (which connected the Burgo bridge to the upper part of the city, on the outer side of the city walls, and which was paved in the 18th century), and in front of the City Hall, the inscription Concello de Pontevedra was placed on stone slabs on the ground. The square was inaugurated as the new pedestrian centre of the city on 12 November 2010. From that moment on, the square has become the venue for most of the social activities of Pontevedra.

== Description ==
This square has the typical structure of the Spanish squares of the late 19th century, with a memorial in the centre. The square has an irregular rectangular shape and covers an area of over 4,000 square metres. It has 1,350 square metres of stone paving and a further 2,200 square metres of cobblestones, as well as landscaped areas, with sections of compacted earth, around the Monument to the Heroes of Puente Sampayo. The cobblestone is the dominant element, but stone is used to highlight prominent features.

In the northern part of the square are the inscriptions Circunvalación and Concello Pontevedra made in the granite slabs of the paving. The Plaza de España acts as a transitional space between the historic centre of the city and the Alameda of the architect Sesmero. Eleven streets converge here in a large open space: Michelena, Alameda, General Martitegui, Prudencio Landín, Herreros, Arzobispo Malvar, Mestre Mateo, Paio Gómez Charino, Bastida, Gran Vía de Montero Ríos and Marquis of Riestra.

The square is presided over on its eastern side by the City Hall of Pontevedra, the seat of municipal political power. On its western side is the building of the Government Subdelegation, the seat of state political power. On its southwest side, surrounded by gardens and compacted earth, is the Monument to the Heroes of Puente Sampayo. Opposite, to the south-east of the monument, are the ruins of the San Domingo convent.

== Outstanding buildings ==
The most important building in the square is the Pontevedra City Hall, which is located on the eastern side of the square and is the focal point. It is an eclectic building of Parisian inspiration, designed by the architect Alejandro Sesmero and inaugurated in August 1880. The building is a balanced ensemble with large Ionic (ground floor) and Corinthian (upper floor) columns that highlight its central part. The entrance door has a semicircular arch decorated with a crown of oak leaves, symbolising strength, and the windows are decorated with the city's coat of arms. The columns that frame the entrance are on a large raised pedestal and are crowned by highly decorated Ionic or Roman Corinthian capitals. Sesmero replaces the acanthus with vegetation (leaves, fruit) hanging from the column. The balustrade at the top contains four kraters at the corners.

On the south-western side of the square is the building of the government sub-delegation, an example of mid-20th century institutional architecture, inaugurated in 1958. The main façade has a monumental entrance with a portico of independent twin columns of Doric order surmounted by the balustrade of a terrace designed for the authorities, delimited by an arched gallery with semi-circular windows. This central body serves as a link to the main entrance of the building.

Close to these buildings are other important and representative buildings of the city: the Palace of the Provincial Council of Pontevedra, the ruins of the Convent of San Domingos, the Valle-Inclán High School, the former Pontevedra Teacher Training College and the former Saint Ferdinand Barracks, as well as the Monument to the Heroes of Puente Sampayo.

== Gallery ==
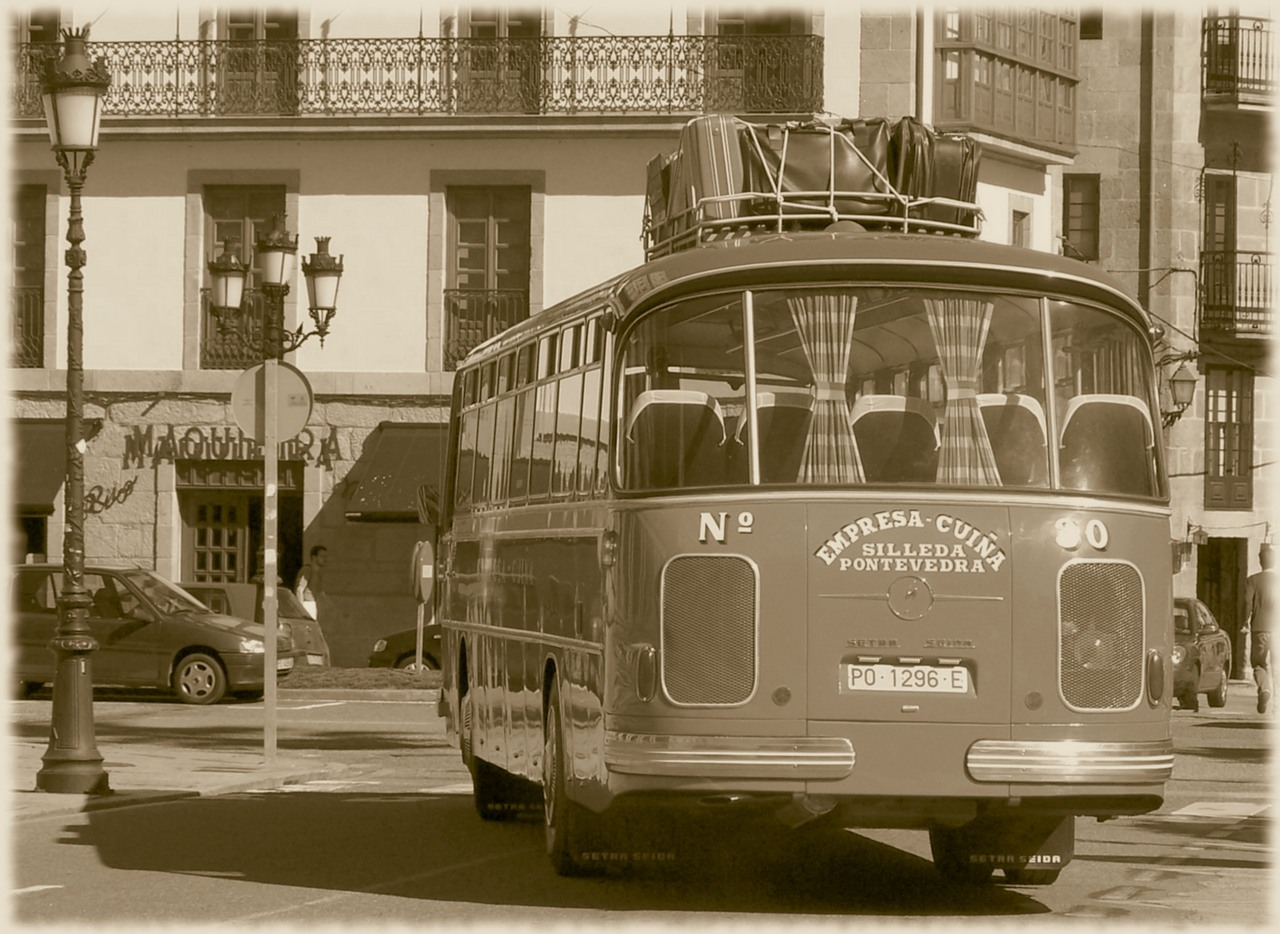
Bus in the square in 2006

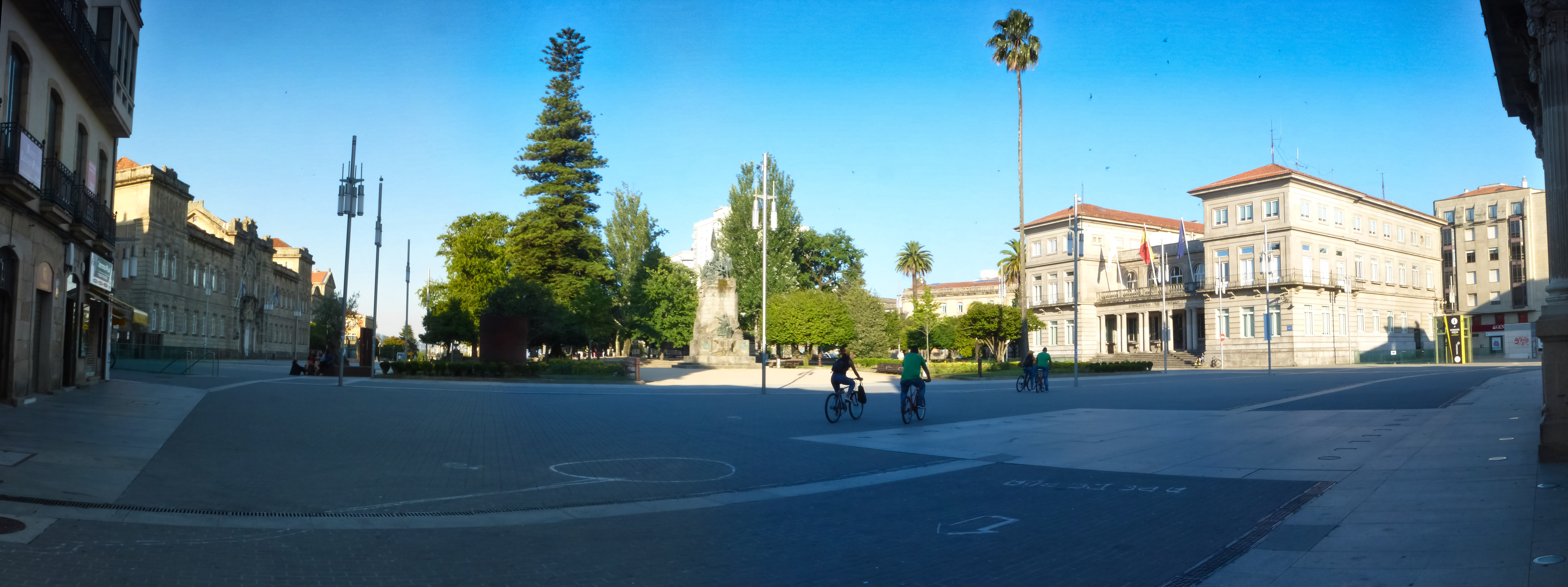
Panoramic view of the square

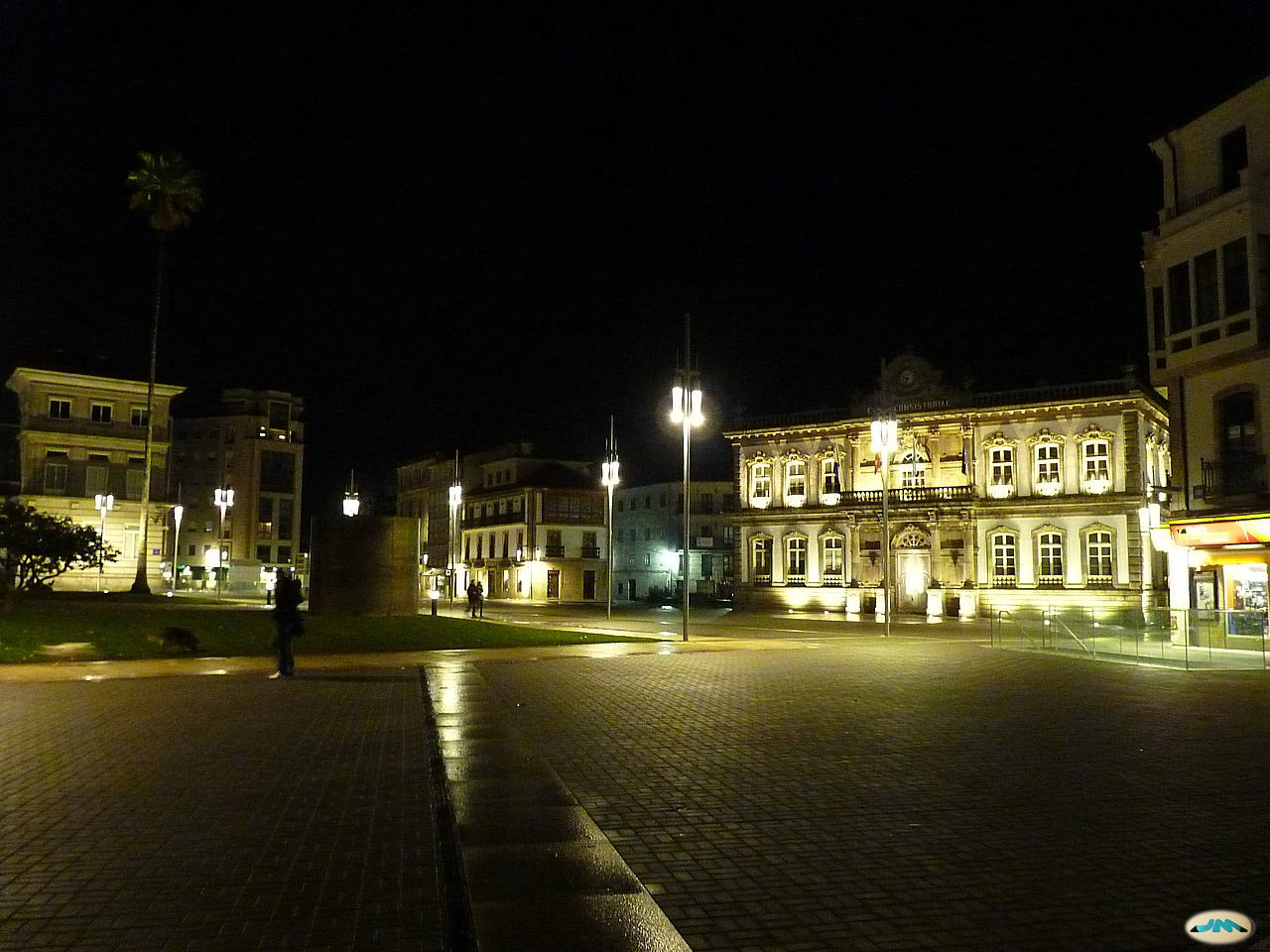
The square by night

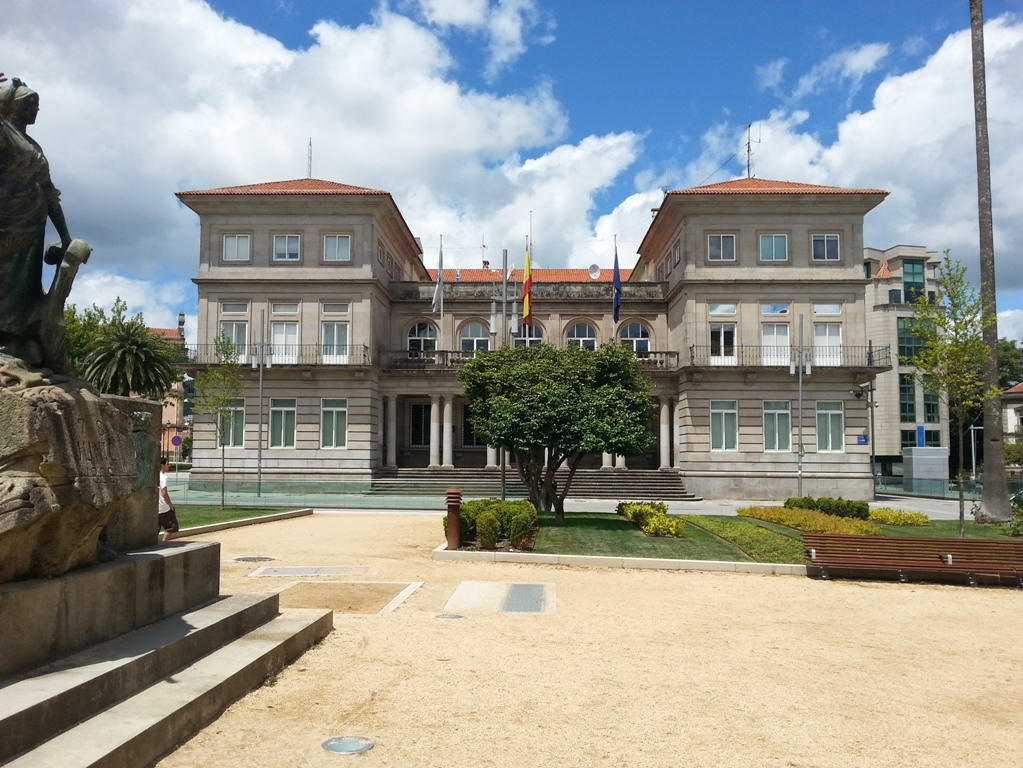
Delegation of the Government building

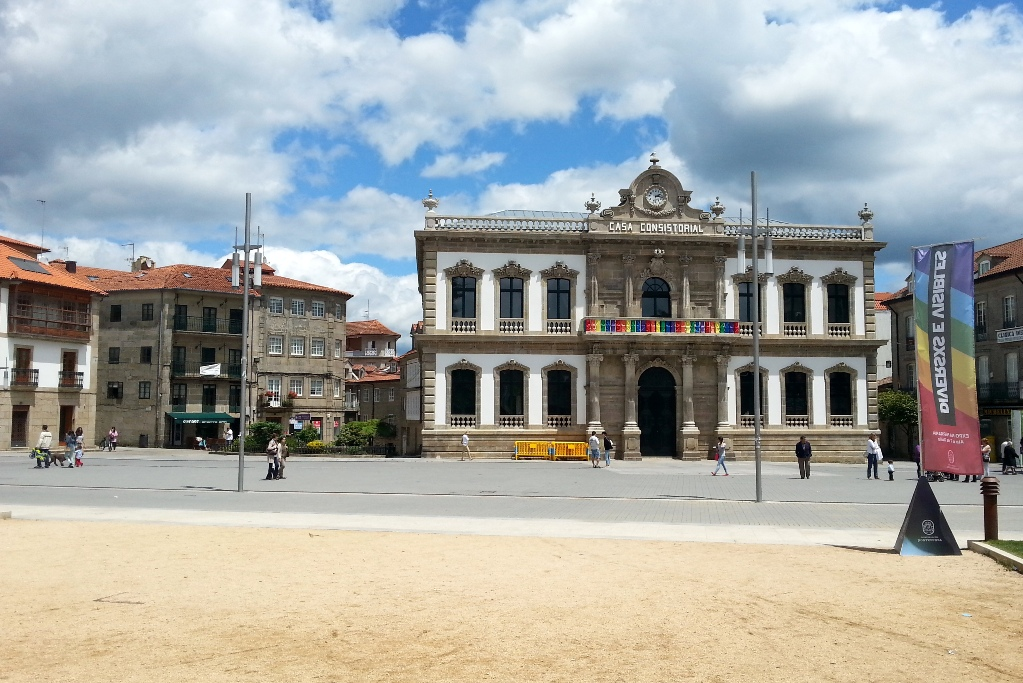
España square

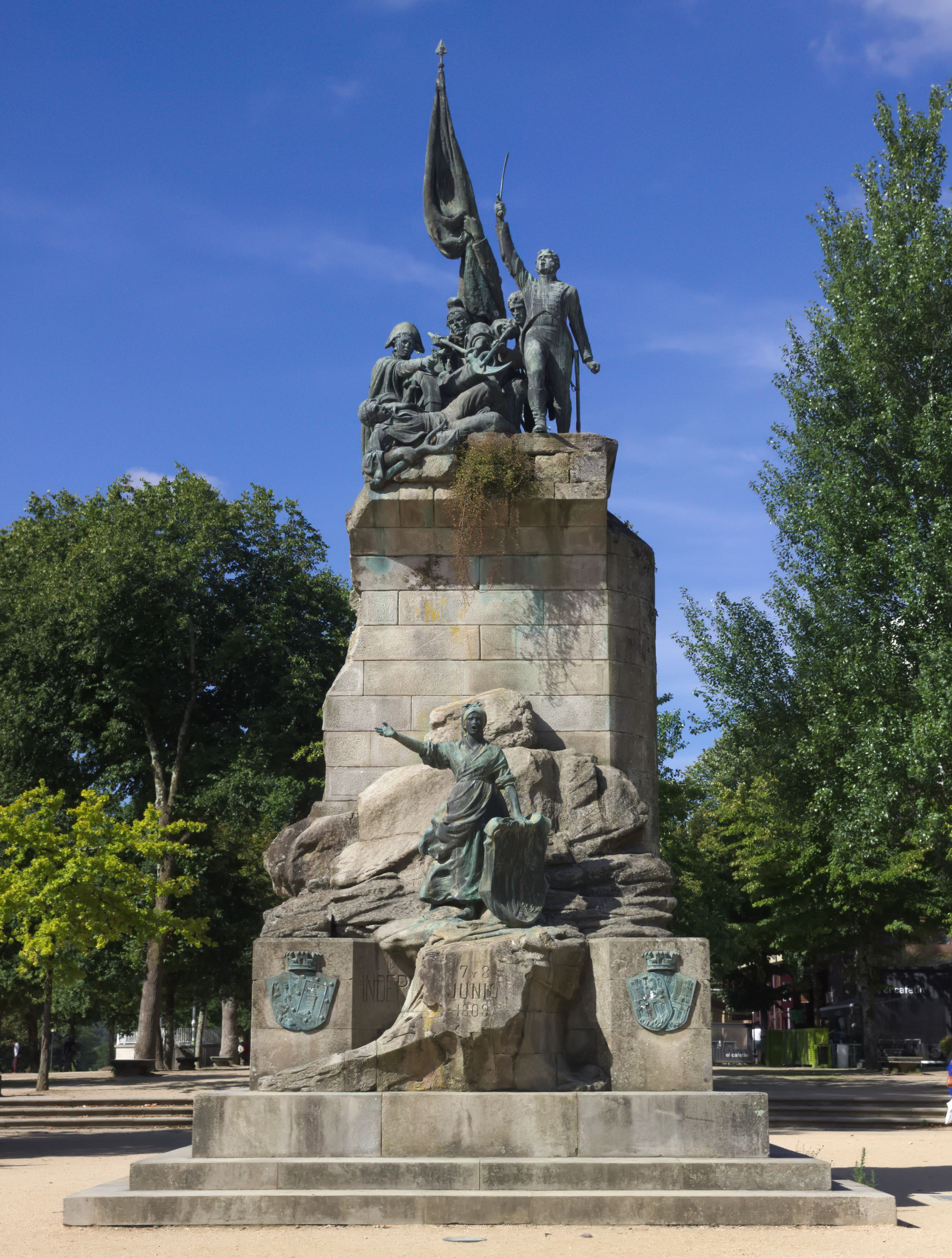
Monument to the heroes of Puente Sampayo

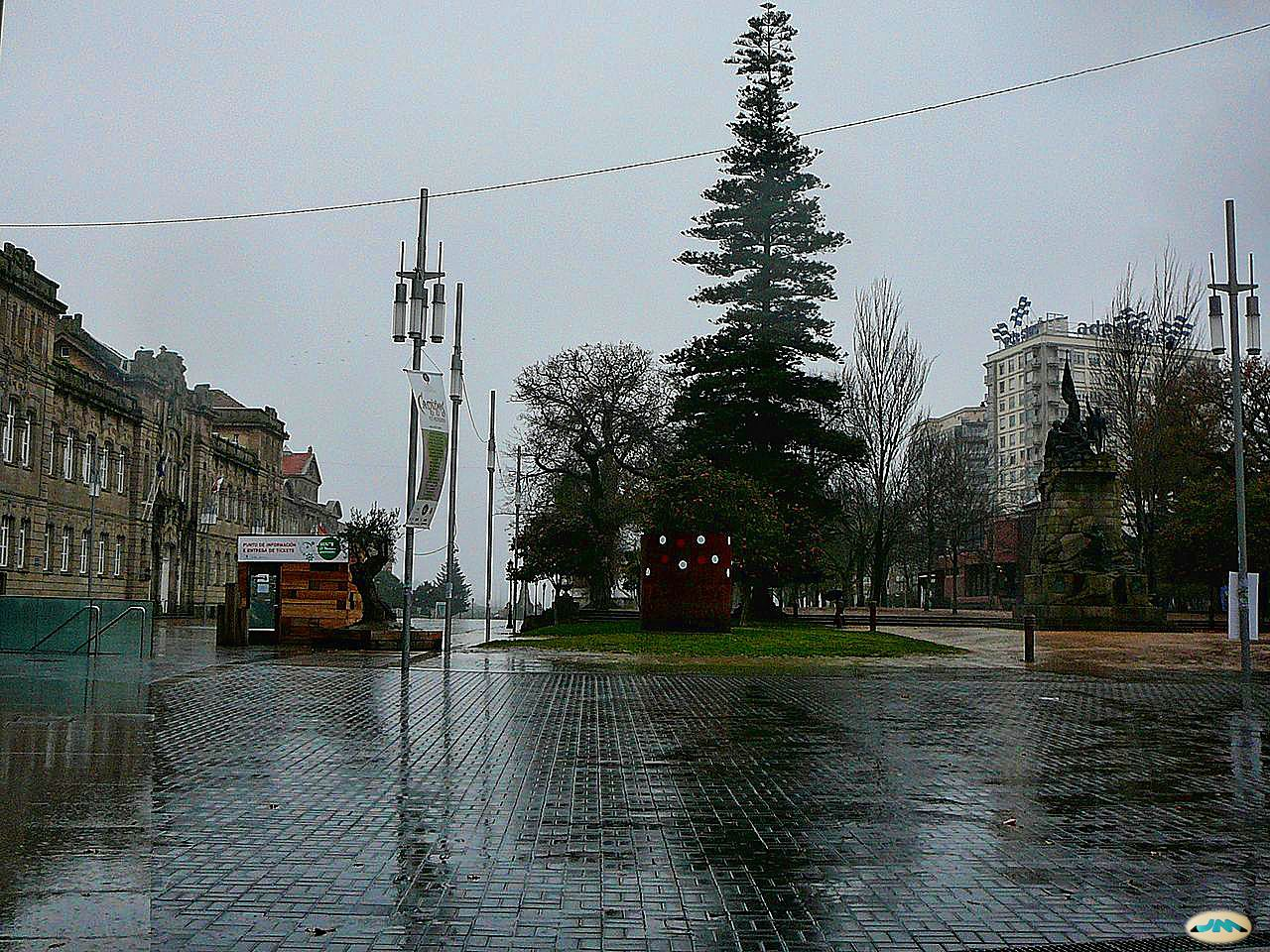
Wet pavement of the square

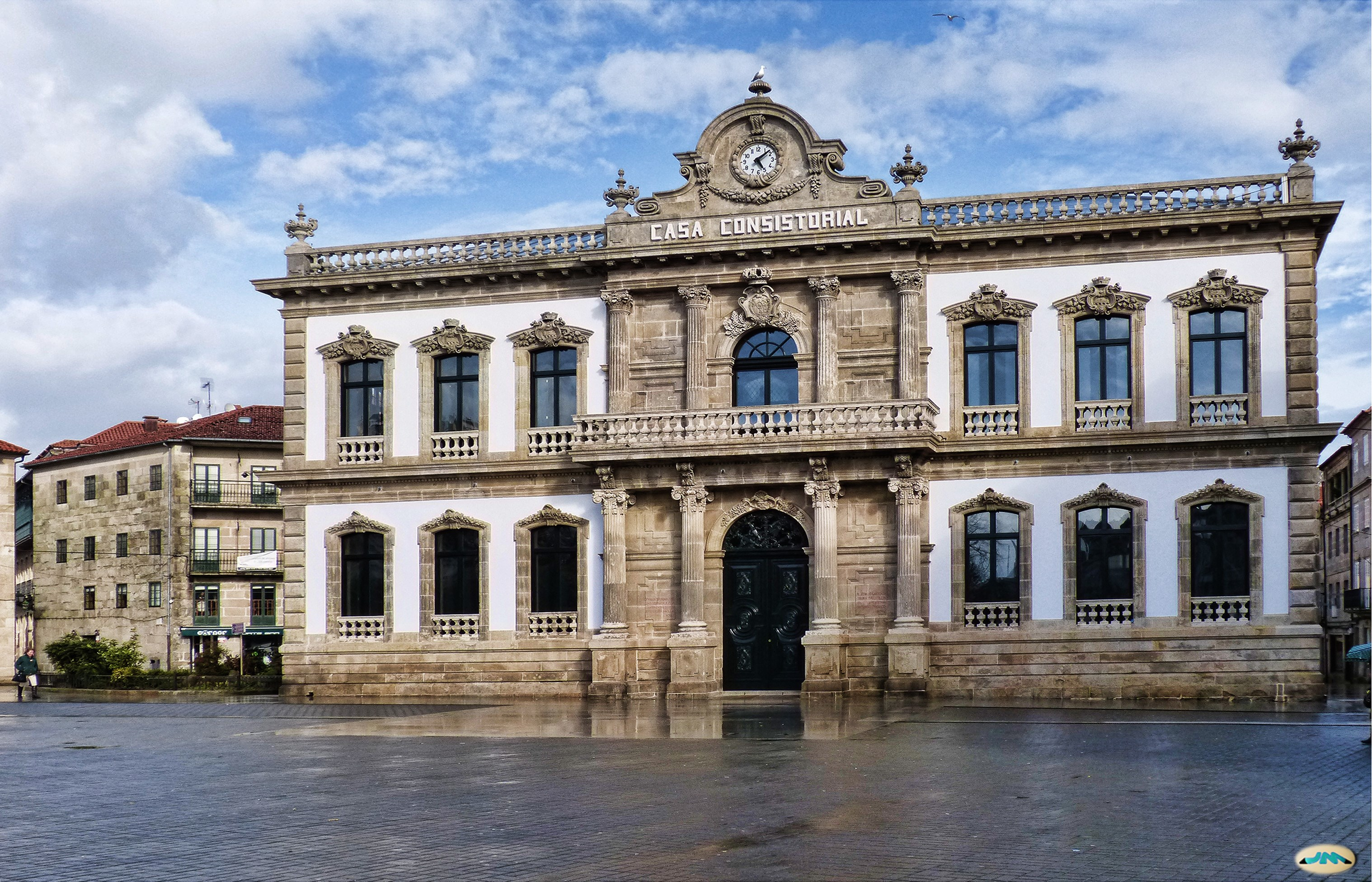
Pontevedra City Hall

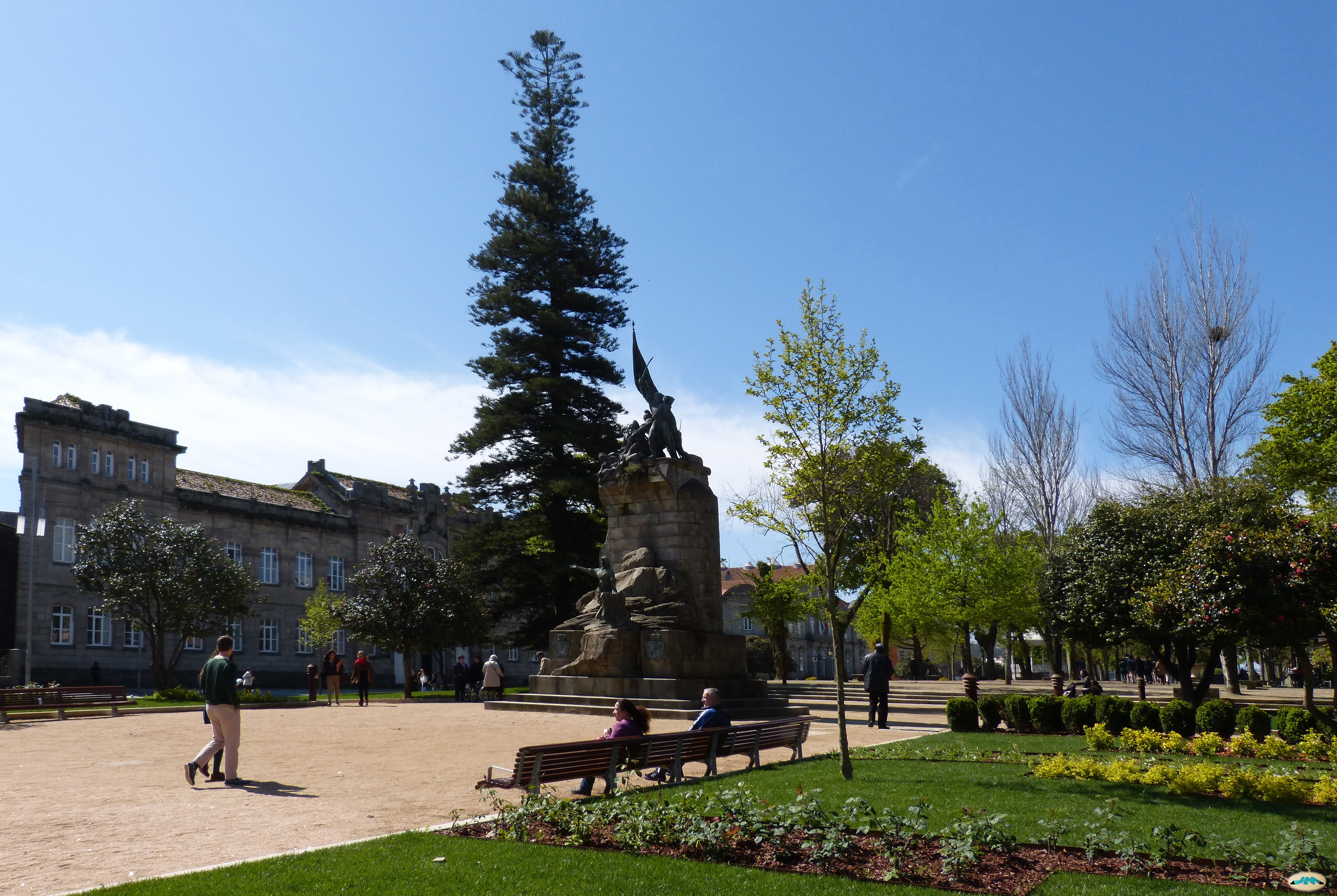
Gardens and monument to the heroes of Puente Sampayo

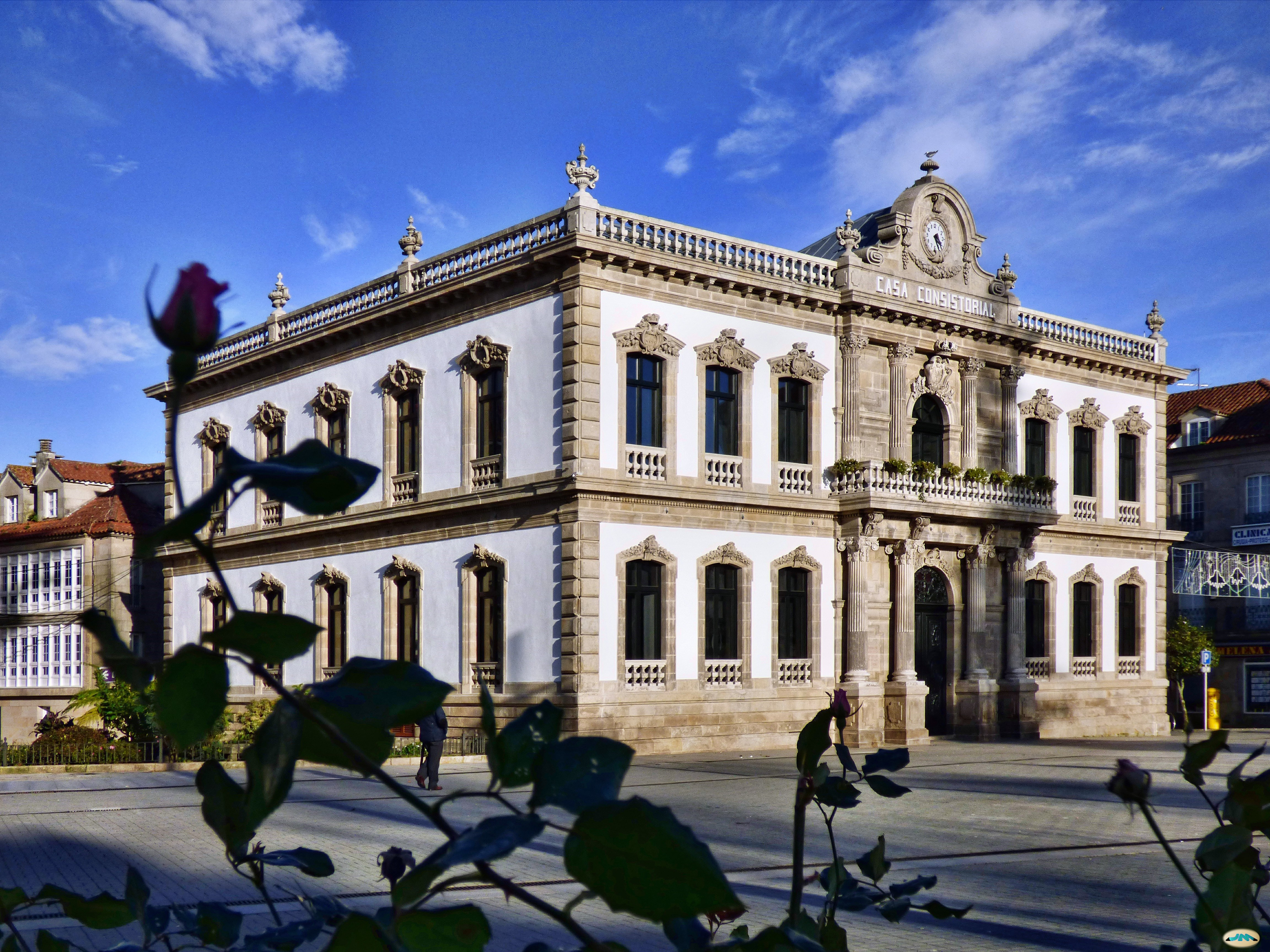
West facade of the city hall

== See also ==
=== Bibliography ===
- Abelleira Doldán, Miguel (2016). La arquitectura en Galicia durante la autarquía: 1939-1953 (in Spanish). La Coruña: Universade da Coruña.
- Abelleira Doldán, Miguel (2018). "La Arquitectura Institucional política en Galicia durante la autarquía". Revista do Departamento de Historia da Arte (in Spanish) (16). Santiago de Compostela: Quintana USC: 126–132. doi:10.15304/qui.16.3802. ISSN 2340-0005.
- Aganzo, Carlos (2010). Pontevedra. Ciudades con encanto (in Spanish). Madrid: El País-Aguilar. pp. 94–95. ISBN 978-8403509344.
- González Clavijo, Pepy (2008). Las calles de Pontevedra (in Spanish). Pontevedra: Deputación de Pontevedra. p. 18. ISBN 978-84-8457-312-8.
- Riveiro Tobío, Elvira (2008). Descubrir Pontevedra (in Spanish). Pontevedra: Edicións do Cumio. pp. 46–47. ISBN 978-8482890852.

=== Related articles ===
- Pontevedra City Hall
- Monument to the heroes of Puente Sampayo
- Gobierno Civil de Pontevedra
- Alameda de Pontevedra
- Old town of Pontevedra
- Ensanche-City Centre
- Marquis of Riestra Street

=== External links ===
- on the website Tourism of the Xunta de Galicia
