= Gobierno Civil de Pontevedra =

Government building in Pontevedra, Spain

- Subdelegación del Gobierno en Pontevedra
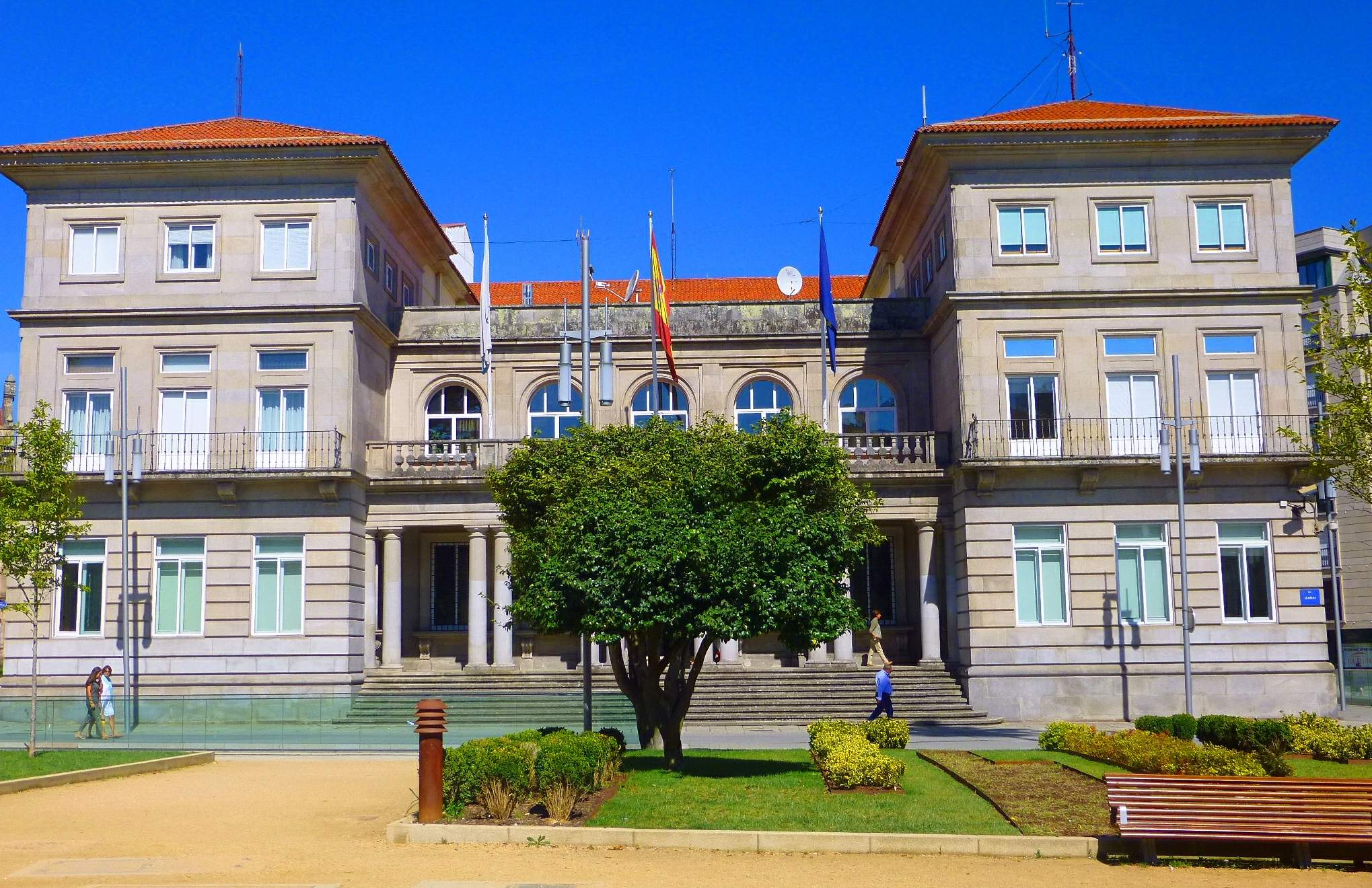
- Main façade
- Interactive map of the Gobierno Civil de Pontevedra area

General information
- Type: Government building
- Location: Pontevedra, Galicia, Spain
- Coordinates: 42°25′55.1″N 8°38′52.3″W
- Construction started: 1950
- Completed: 1958
- Opening: 1958
- Owner: Government of Spain
- Management: Government of Spain

Technical details
- Floor count: 3

Design and construction
- Architect: Enrique López-Izquierdo Blanco

Website
- mptfp.gob.es/portal/delegaciones_gobierno/delegaciones/galicia/sub_pontevedra.html

The Gobierno Civil de Pontevedra, currently Subdelegación del Gobierno de Pontevedra, is an official building located in Pontevedra, Galicia (Spain). It has served since its construction as the government delegation office representing the Spanish state in the province of Pontevedra.

== Location ==
The building is located in the centre of the city's political power, in the northwest corner of the Alameda de Pontevedra, next to the Plaza de España, very close to other institutional buildings such as the Pontevedra City Hall, the Valle-Inclán High School, the Faculty of Fine Arts and the Pontevedra Provincial Council Palace.

== History ==
In 1833, the Spanish government appointed as the first provincial authority a State representative in each of the capitals of the Spanish provinces and in Pontevedra, his seat was until 1891 the convent of San Francisco. Until 1997, the name of this representative was "Civil Governor", when it was renamed "Sub-delegate of the Government". Such an important political position required a building in keeping with the nature of the institution it represented. For this reason, from 1939 onwards, the General Direction of Architecture of the Spanish State implemented a plan so that the seats of the so-called civil governments that housed the civil governor in each province would have the decorum and dignity required by this institution.

In Galicia, the civil government building in Pontevedra, designed by the architect Enrique López-Izquierdo Blanco, was the last of the four Galician provinces to be built between 1950 and 1958. Following the premises of the Spanish State, the Pontevedra City Council ceded an isolated rectangular plot of land in the most dignified non-commercial square in the city (the Plaza de España), where the seats of the municipal (Pontevedra City Hall) and provincial (Pontevedra Provincial Council) authorities were to co-exist in the same space.

In 1945, the architect P. Durán presented a first project in which the main façade of the Civil Government faced the Plaza de España, which was rejected by the municipal authorities. The architect Enrique López-Izquierdo corrected this error in his 1950 project by placing the building facing the Alameda de Pontevedra and not on its side, which led to the project being accepted and carried out. The building was inaugurated in 1958.

On 5 December 1996, the stone coat of arms of the Franco regime was removed from the façade of the building and the constitutional coat of arms was placed in its place.

== Description ==
The building is an example of mid-20th century institutional architecture.

The Civil Government of Pontevedra has three main functions: institutional (represented by the main staircase and the meeting and reception room), administrative (offices of the General Secretary and other different offices) and residential, with accommodation for the Civil Governor and the General Secretary, as well as accommodation for the subordinate staff. This diversity of uses implies the existence of several entrances: a main entrance on the main southern façade and three secondary entrances on the other three façades for access to the administrative and police offices and the accommodation. There is also a vehicle entrance in the centre of the north façade, opposite the main façade.

The use of symmetry is total in the plan of the U-shaped building. Inside, on the ground floor, there is a main entrance from which a grand staircase leads to the most representative spaces of the provincial political power on the first floor, known as the noble floor: the rooms and offices of the civil governor and the general secretary. There are also secondary staircases arranged symmetrically. The main staircase is illuminated by an inner courtyard. The ground floor contains offices and rooms for the security forces. There is also a semi-basement level for other less important facilities. On the second floor of the building there is a combination of administrative and residential areas. The structure is made of reinforced concrete, and the lines of the pillars are clearly recognisable in the floors of the building.

On the outside, the façade is made of ashlar to emphasise the severity of the building's function. The facades are made of concrete, clad in ashlar with bossage on the ground floor. The balustrades, Corbels and Cornices are also in stone. The main façade has a monumental entrance with a portico of independent twin columns of Doric order surmounted by the balustrade of a terrace designed for the authorities, delimited by an arched gallery with semi-circular windows. This central body serves as a link to the main entrance of the building. The flags of Galicia, Spain and the European Union fly over this terrace, which is framed by the tower-like volumes of the first and second floors. On the sides of the first floor there are angled balconies.

On the rear façade is the garage door with two oeil de boeuf windows on each side. On the east side of the second floor there is another oeil de boeuf between the last two windows.

== Gallery ==
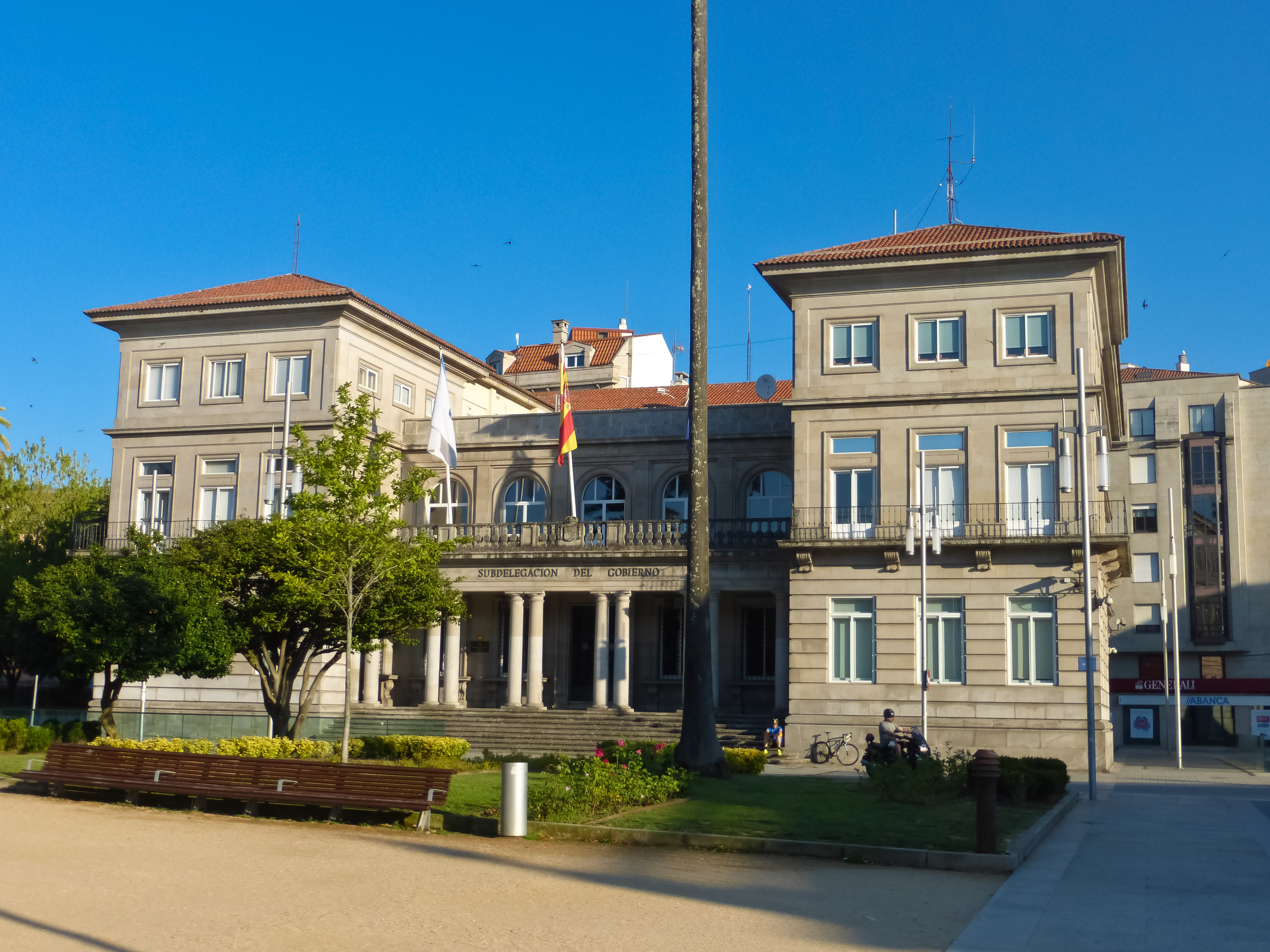

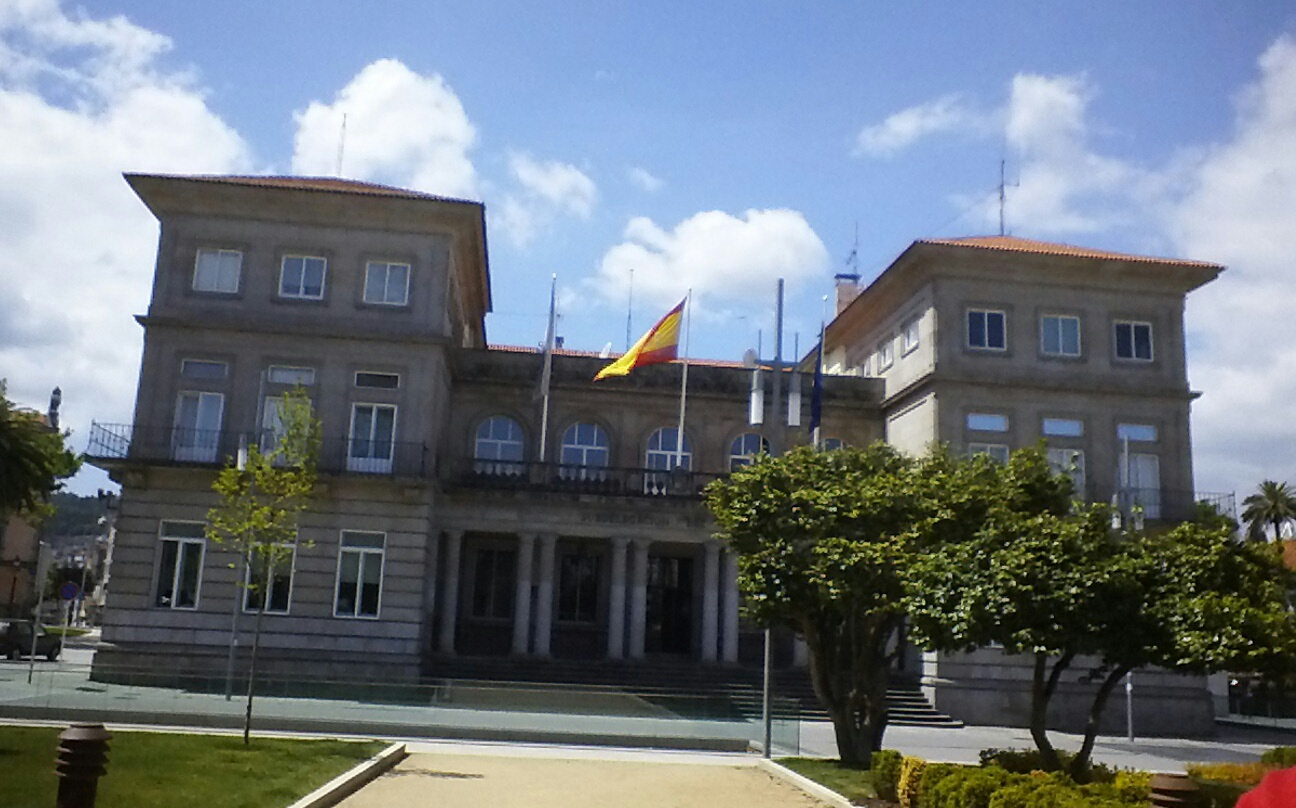

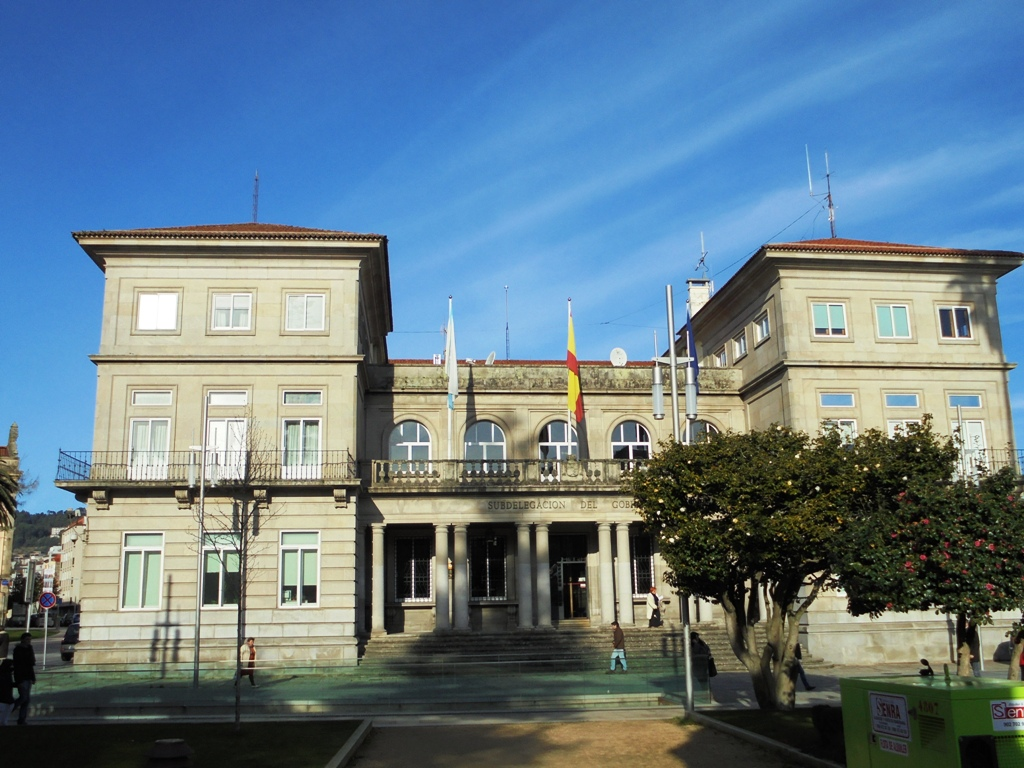

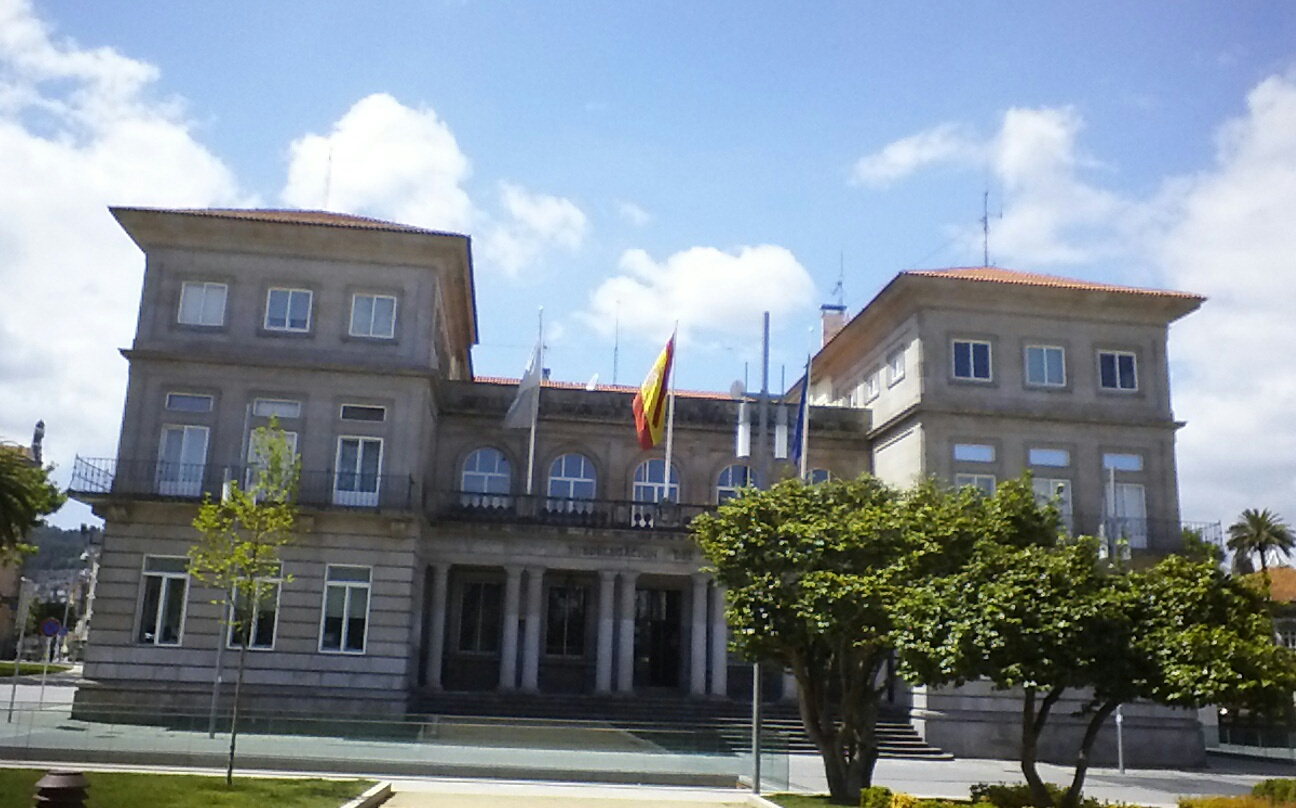

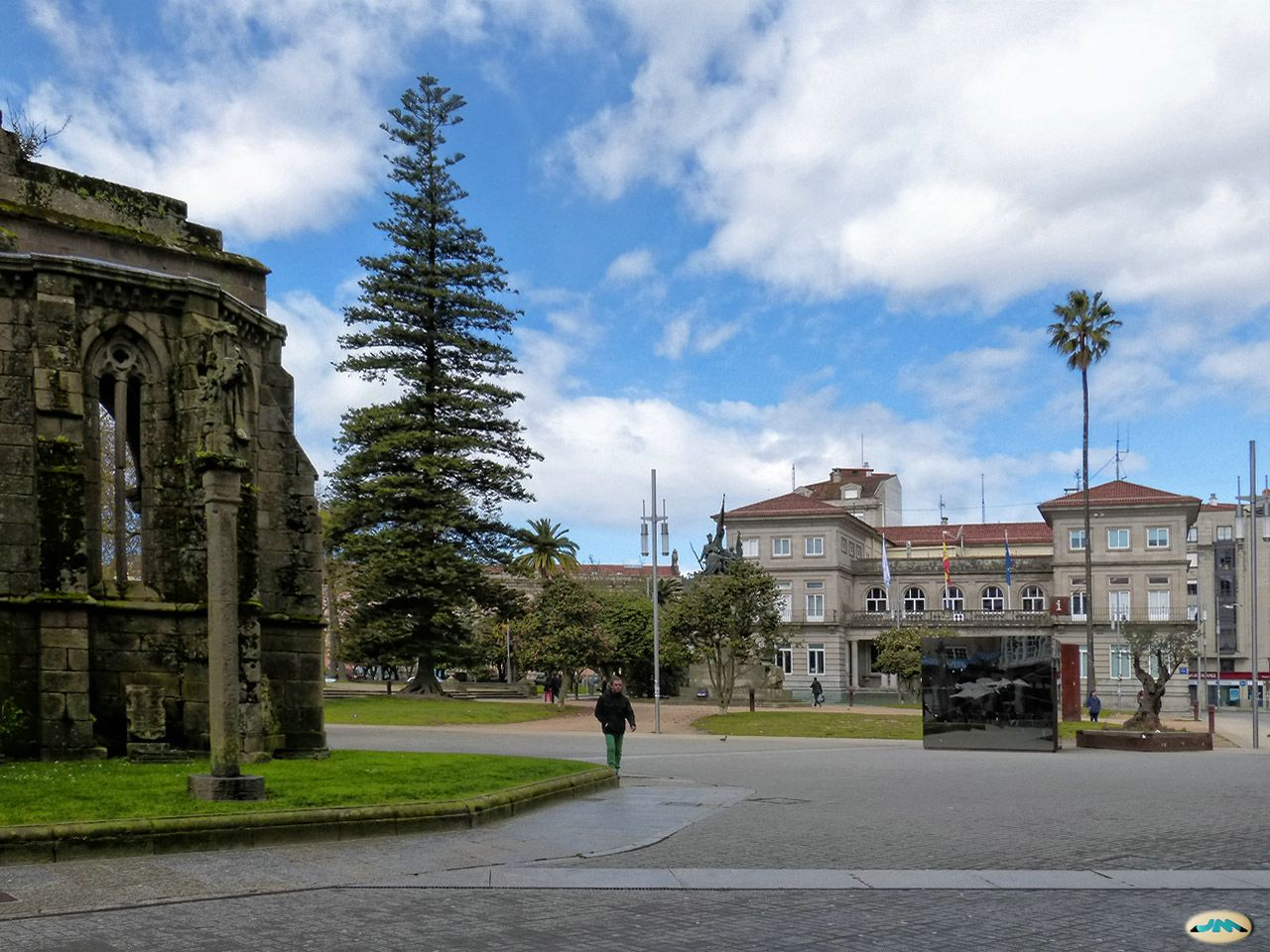

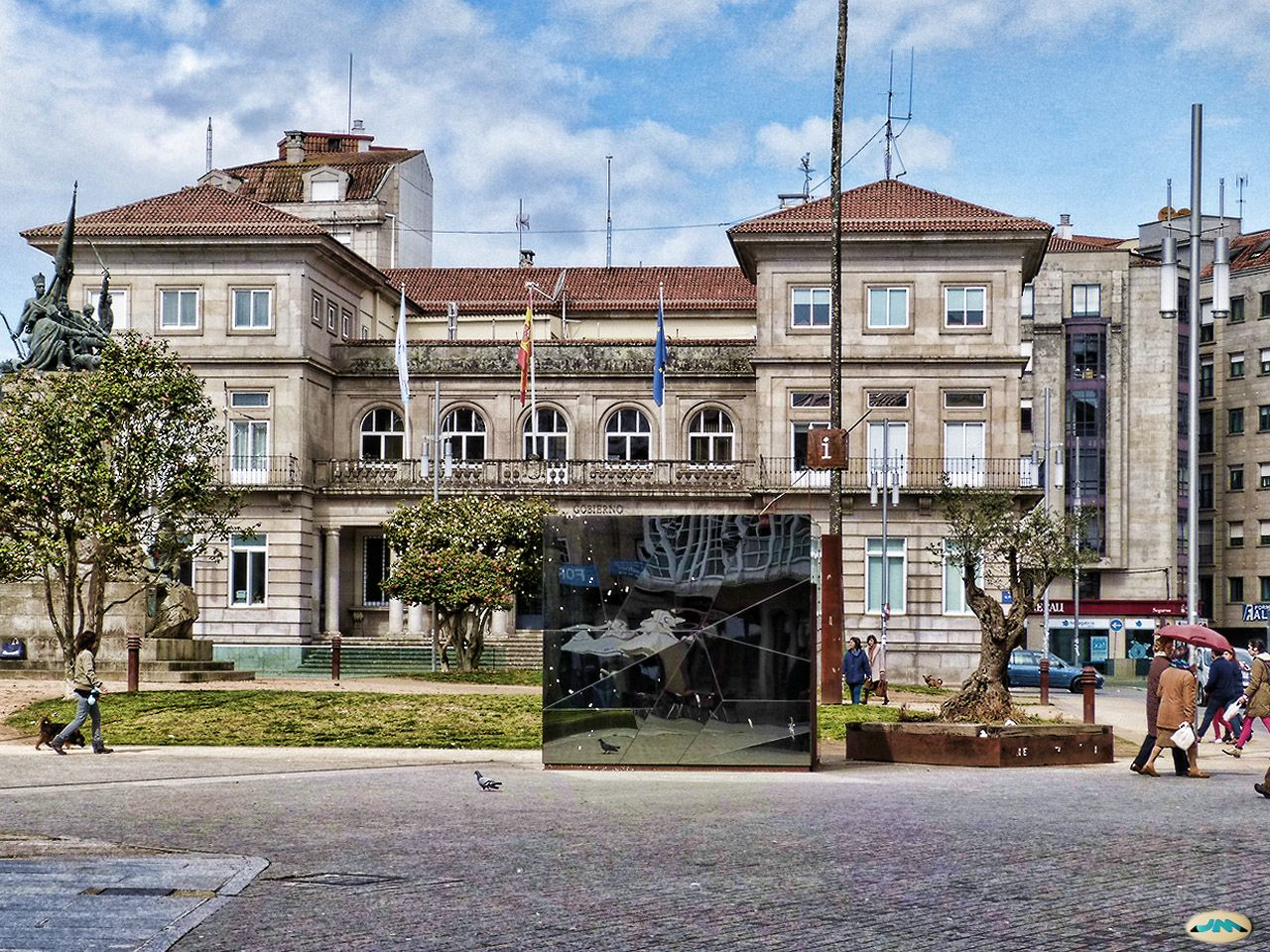

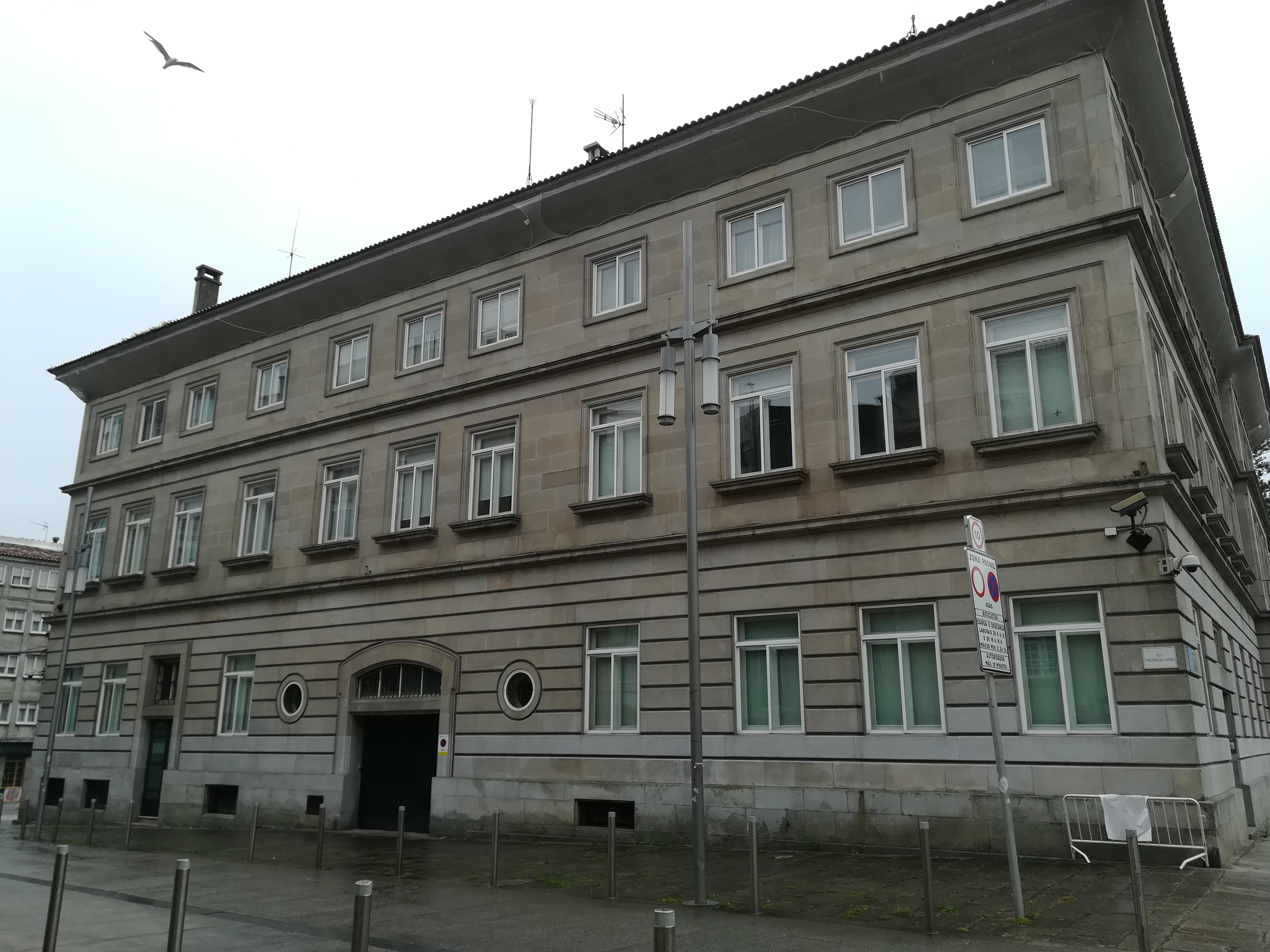
North façade

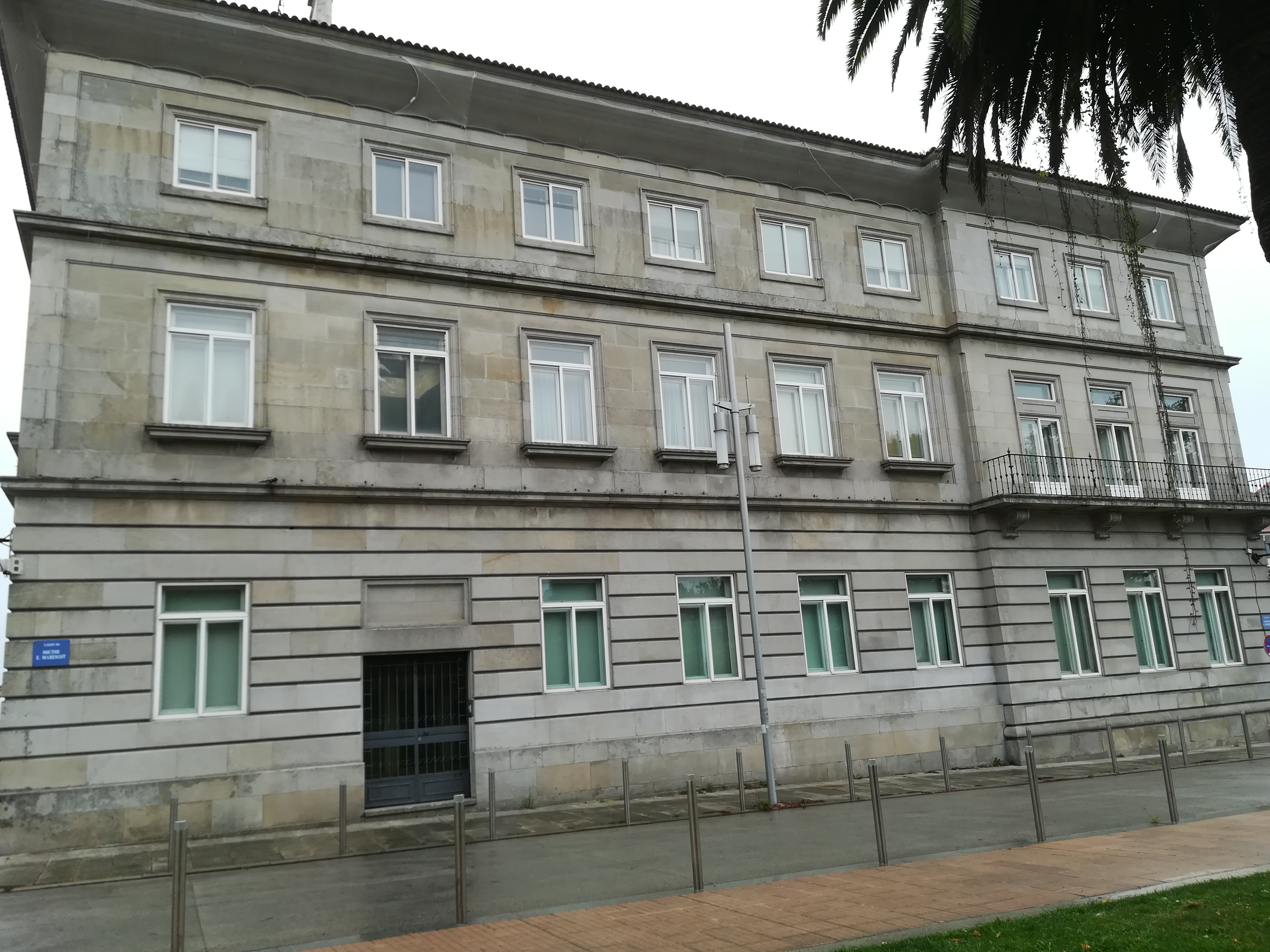
West façade

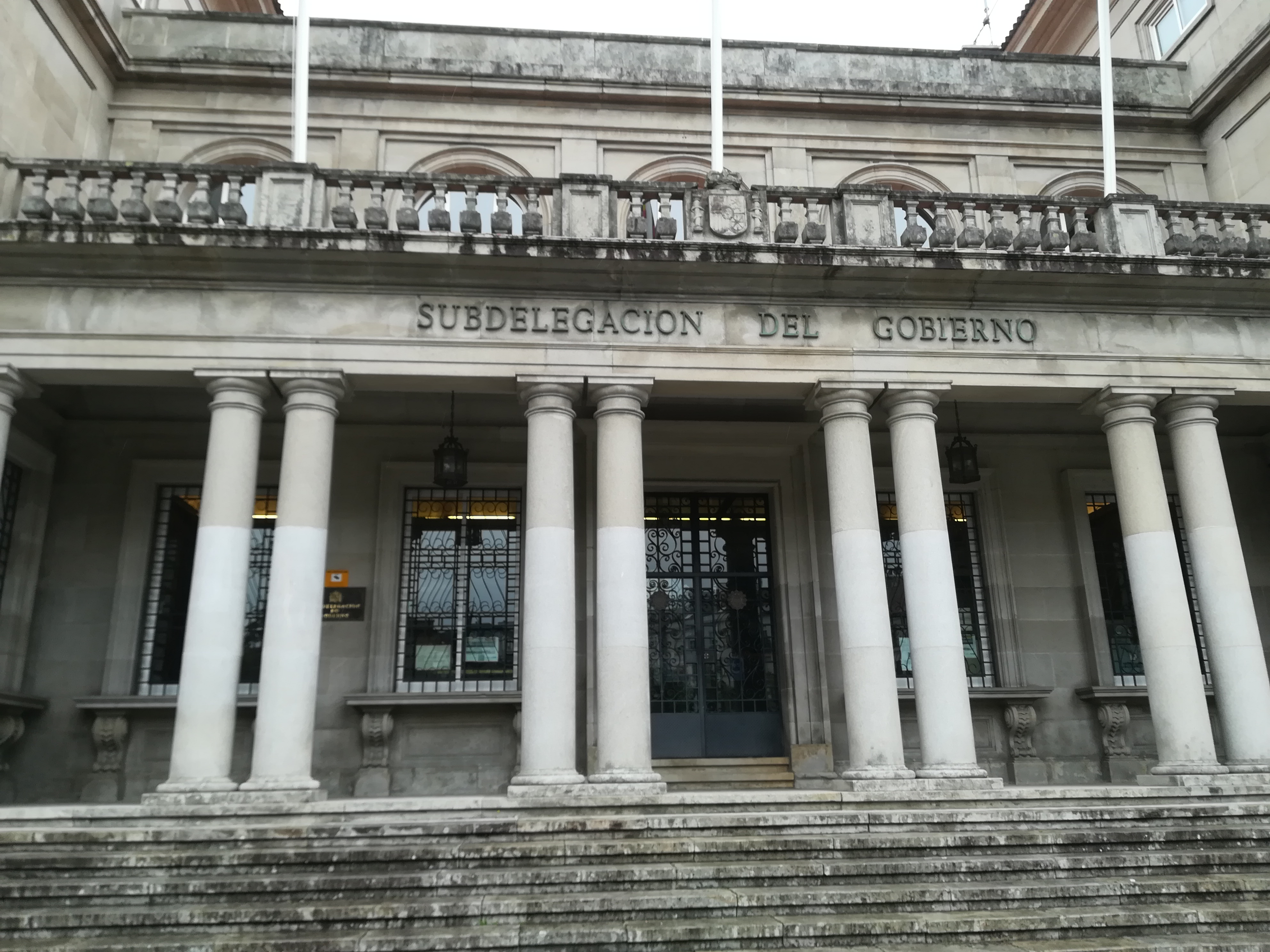
Entrance

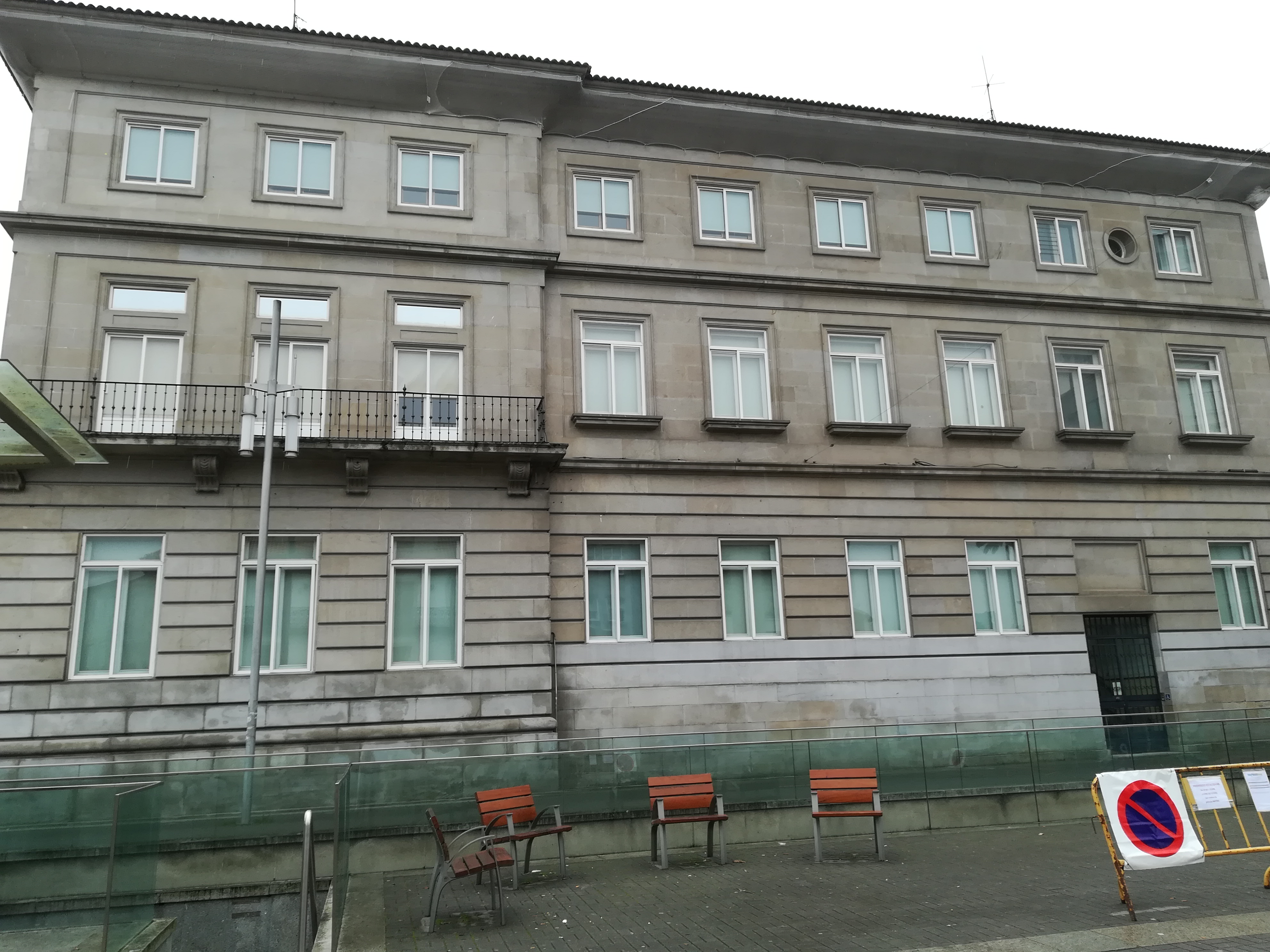
East façade

== See also ==
=== Bibliography ===
- Abelleira Doldán, Miguel (2016). La arquitectura en Galicia durante la autarquía: 1939–1953 (in Spanish). La Coruña: Universade da Coruña.
- Abelleira Doldán, Miguel (2018). La Arquitectura Institucional política en Galicia durante la autarquía (in Spanish). Santiago de Compostela: Quintana USC. p. 126-132. ISSN 2340-0005.https://doi.org/10.15304/qui.16.3802
- Aganzo, Carlos (2010). Pontevedra. Ciudades con encanto (in Spanish). Madrid: El País-Aguilar. p. 94. ISBN 978-8403509344.

=== Related articles ===
- Plaza de España (Pontevedra)
- Alameda de Pontevedra
- Pontevedra City Hall
- Pontevedra Provincial Council Palace
- Faculty of Fine Arts of Pontevedra

=== External links ===
- Official website of the Subdelegación del Gobierno de Pontevedra
- Directory of the Subdelegación del Gobierno in Pontevedra
- La arquitectura institucional política en Galicia durante la autarquía
