= Monument to the heroes of Puente Sampayo =

Sculptural group in Pontevedra, Spain

Monumento a los Héroes de Puente Sampayo
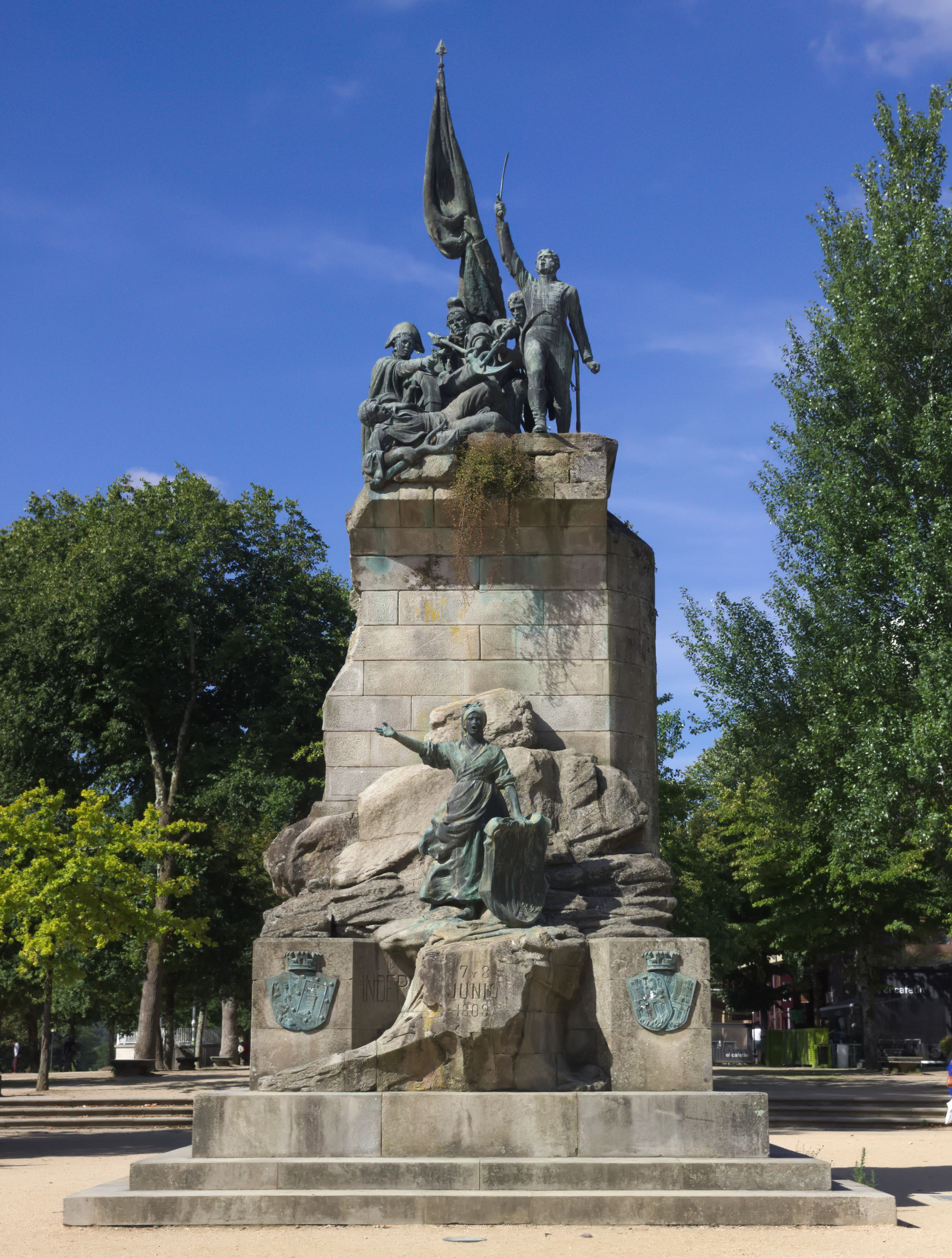
- The Monument in 2017
- Artist: Julio González Pola
- Completion date: 27 August 1911; 114 years ago
- Medium: Bronze, Granite
- Subject: Battle of Puente Sampayo
- Condition: Good
- Location: Pontevedra, Spain; 42°25′54.1″N 8°38′51.0″W

The Monument to the Heroes of Puente Sampayo is a memorial and sculptural group created by the Spanish sculptor Julio González Pola, in Pontevedra, Spain.

It is in the gardens of the Plaza de España and was inaugurated on 27 August 1911. The monument commemorates the courage of the people of Pontevedra led by the officer Pablo Morillo and their triumph over the Napoleonic troops of Marshal Michel Ney, liberating Pontevedra from the occupation of the French army on 7 and 8 June 1809.

== History ==
The Galician parliamentarian Eduardo Vincenti Reguera and the Galician Centre in Madrid were the main actors in the creation of the monument. On 9 February 1909, the Pontevedra City Council agreed to grant a subsidy of 500 pesetas and, later, authorised the contribution of the granite stone that supports the figures. This initiative was also supported by Javier Puig Llamas, mayor of Pontevedra at the time, and Eugenio Montero Ríos, president of the Senate. All these authorities made speeches at the inauguration of the monument on 27 August 1911.

The government of King Alfonso XIII, which donated the bronze needed for the sculpture, also awarded a medal to commemorate the Battle of Puente Sampayo. The contribution of many private individuals to the financing of the monument is also attested to.

The statue was surrounded by a monumental fountain built in 1983, which was removed in 2009 to return the monument and its surroundings to their original spatial design.

== Description ==
This sculptural group belongs to the Spanish commemorative sculpture movement of the early 20th century.

The group is eight metres high. It consists of several bronze figures on a granite pedestal representing a group of farmers, soldiers and students led by officer Pablo Morillo, holding a flag in the final moments of the battle.

In the central part of the monument, a female figure (representing Galicia and the homeland) rests her hand on a shield with the Spanish coat of arms and extends her arm to invite combat. In the upper part, the figure of the officer Pablo Morillo encourages sword fighting. Next to him are a peasant, a student, a soldier and another wounded fighter representing the resistance of the people against the invader. Behind them is the flag and next to it a cannon.

In the corners of the lower part of the monument are the four coats of arms of the Galician provinces. The central granite construction symbolises one of the pillars of the Puente Sampayo bridge, where most of the battle took place and which was destroyed after the battle.

On the back, the central granite body bears the following inscription in bronze letters :

LOS HÉROES DE PUENTESAMPAYO ACAUDILLADOS POR MORILLO

And below :

PRIMER CENTENARIO 1909

On the right-hand side there is another inscription carved into the stone which reads:

JULIO G POLA – ESCULTOR

In the left-hand corner of the ensemble, it bears the following inscription:

ERIGIDO POR SUSCRIPCIÓN POPULAR
A INICIATIVA DEL CENTRO GALLEGO DE MADRID
PRESIDIDO POR EL EXCMO. S. D. EDUARDO VICENTI Y REGUERA
Y SIENDO ALCALDE DE PONTEVEDRA D. JAVIER PUIG LLAMAS
Y GOBERNADOR DE LA PROVINCIA D. JOSÉ BOENTE SEQUEIROS

== The sculptural group in popular culture ==
It is considered by the art history professor Francisco Portela Sandoval to be one of the most successful monuments of the time due to its composition and faithful reproduction of the event it aims to immortalise.

== Gallery ==
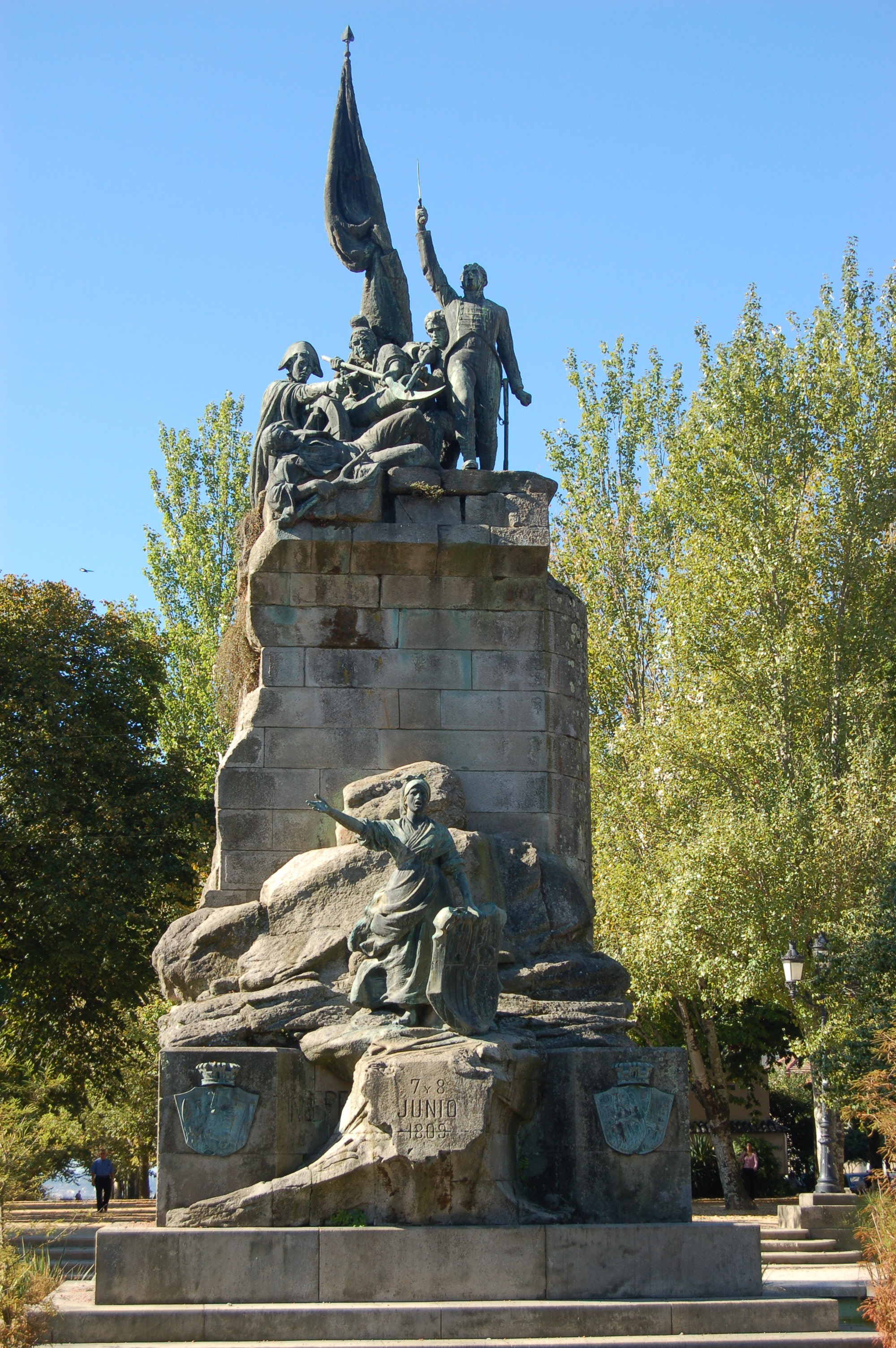

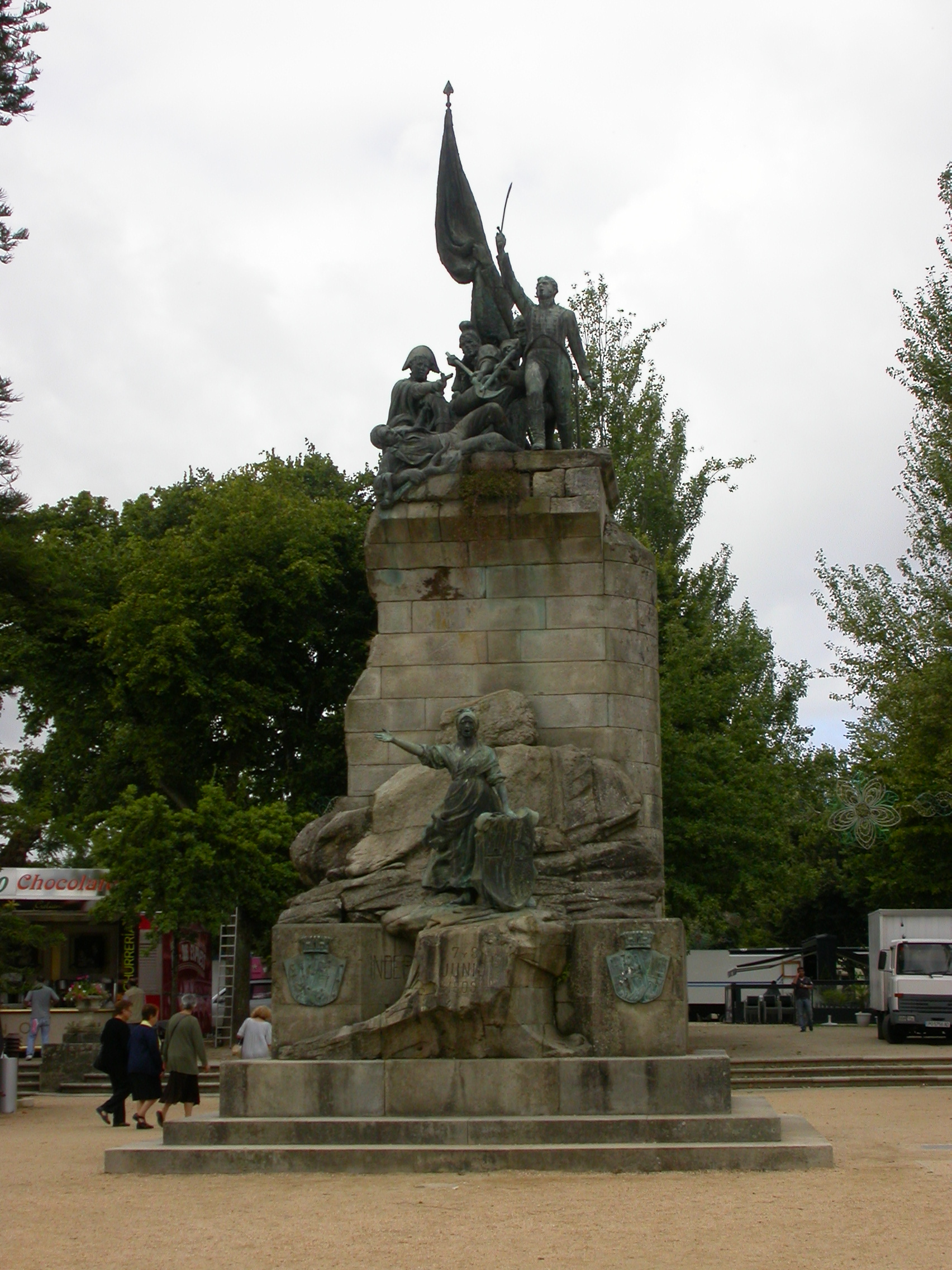

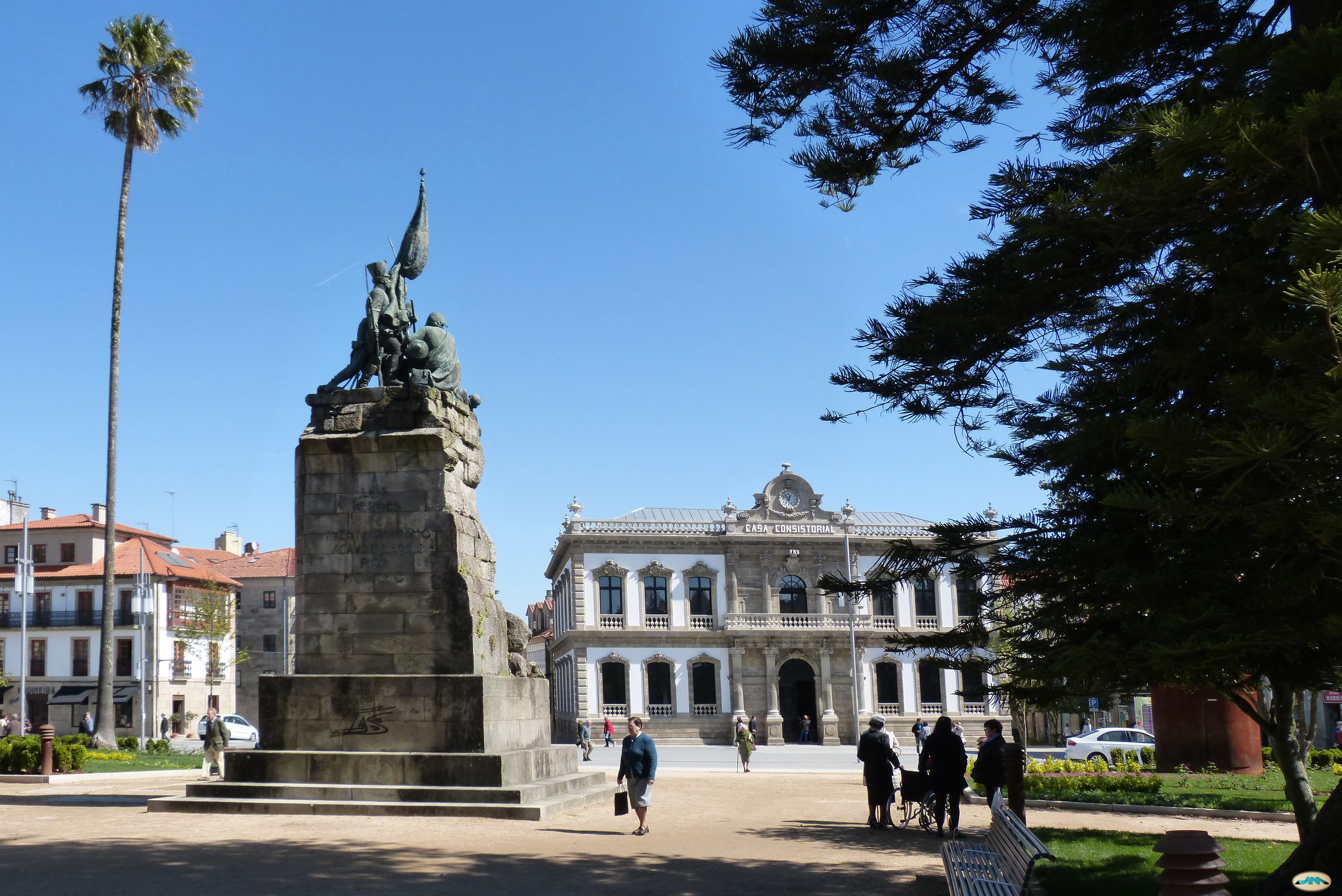

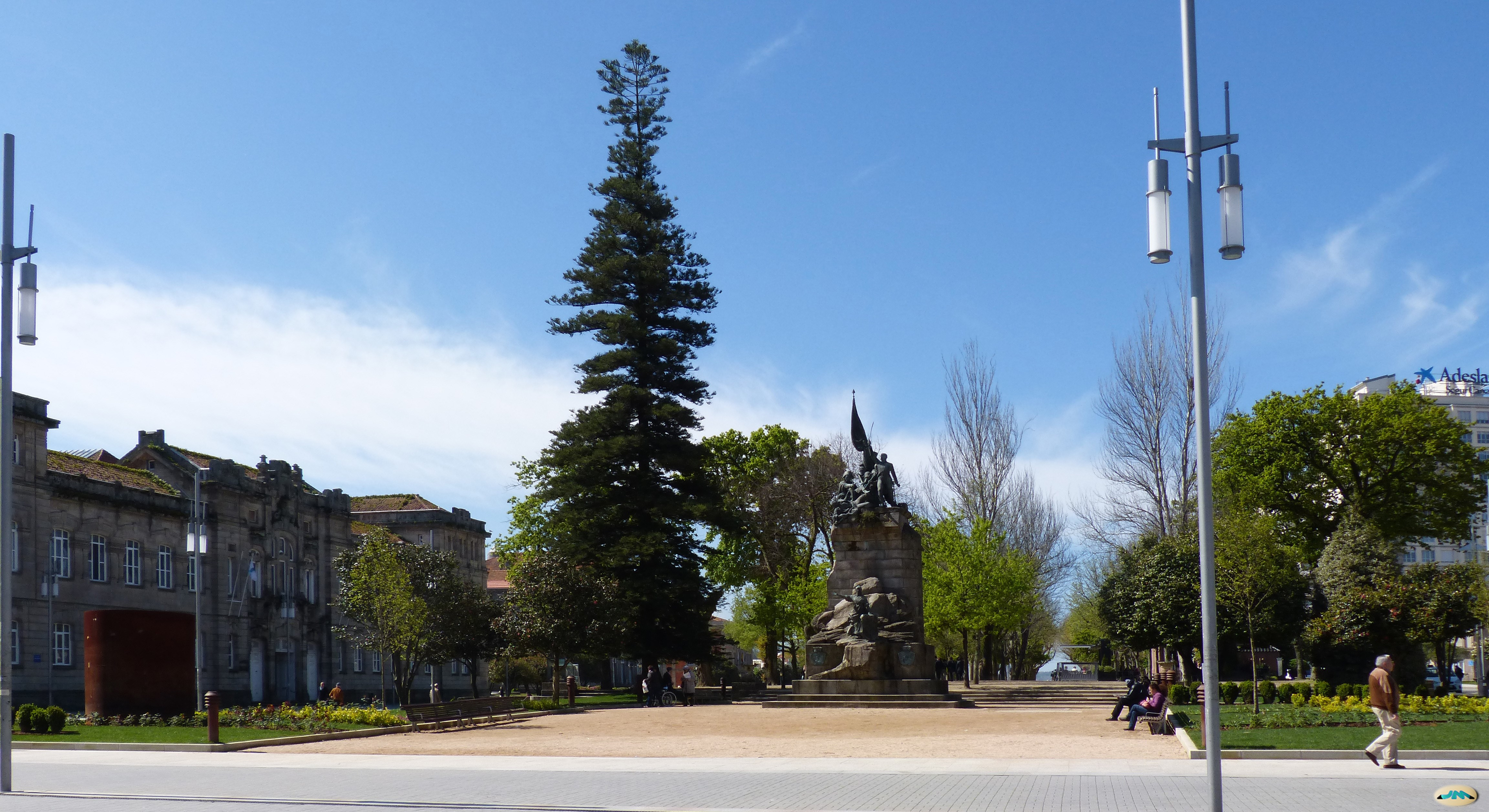

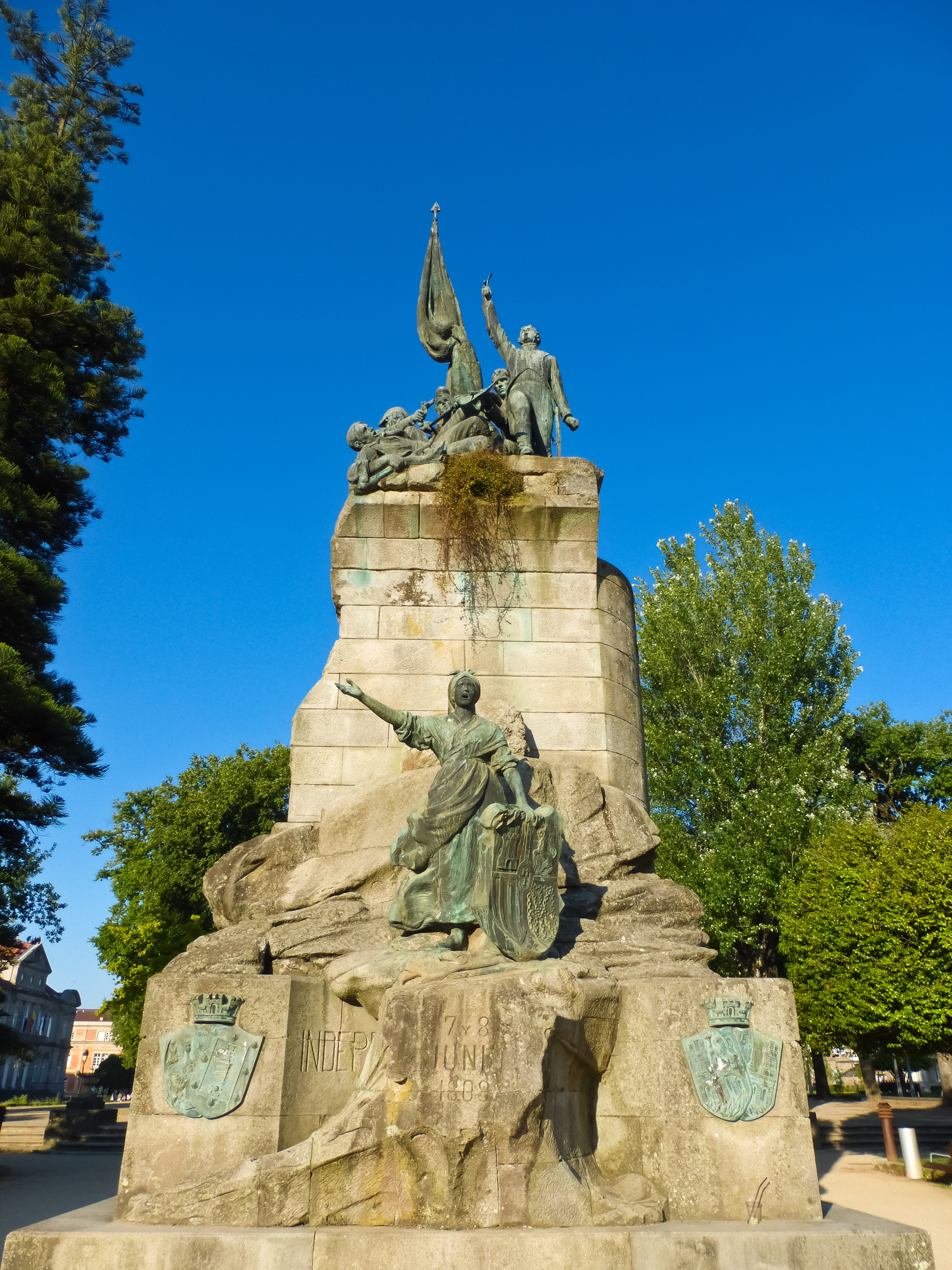

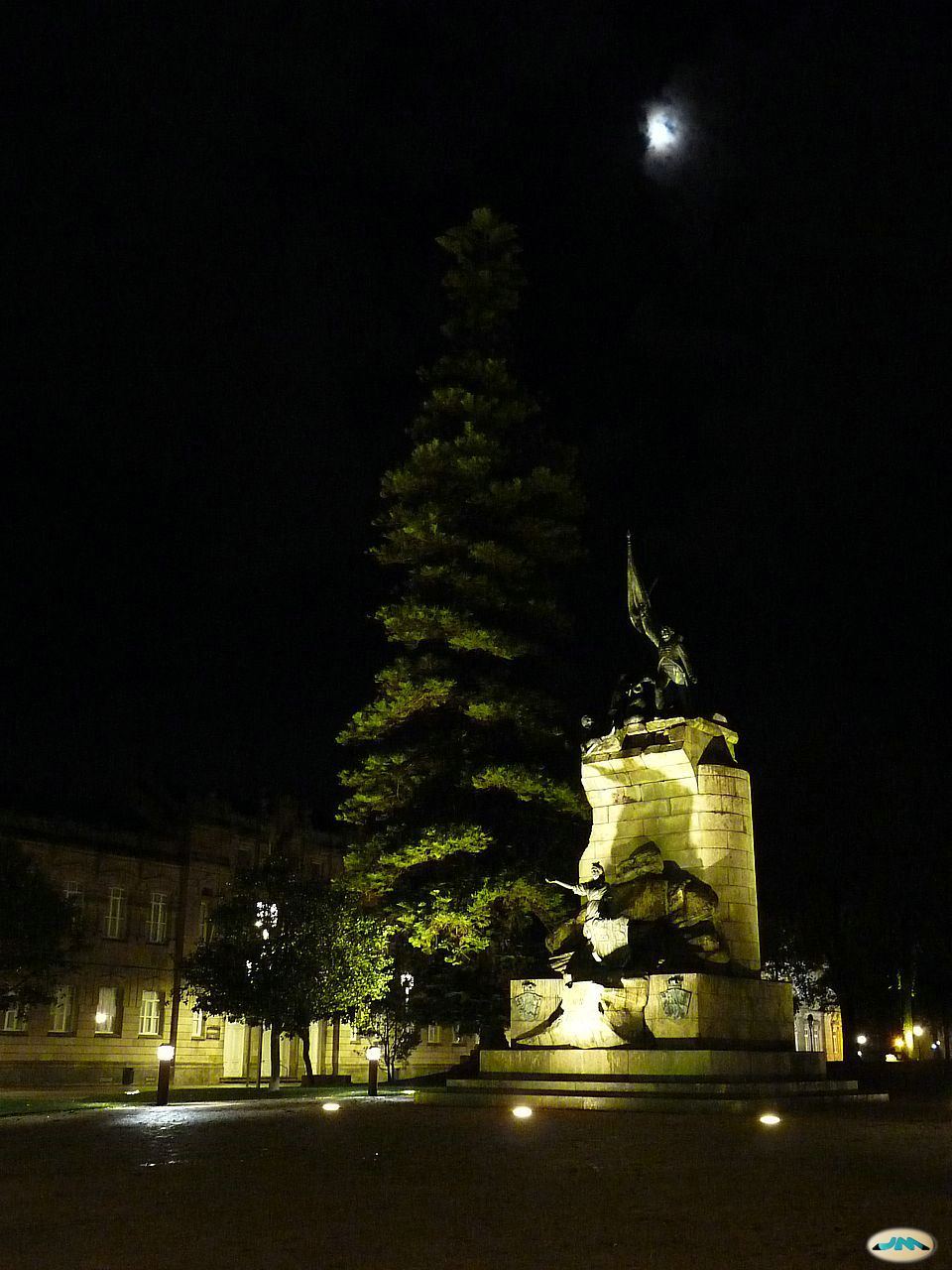

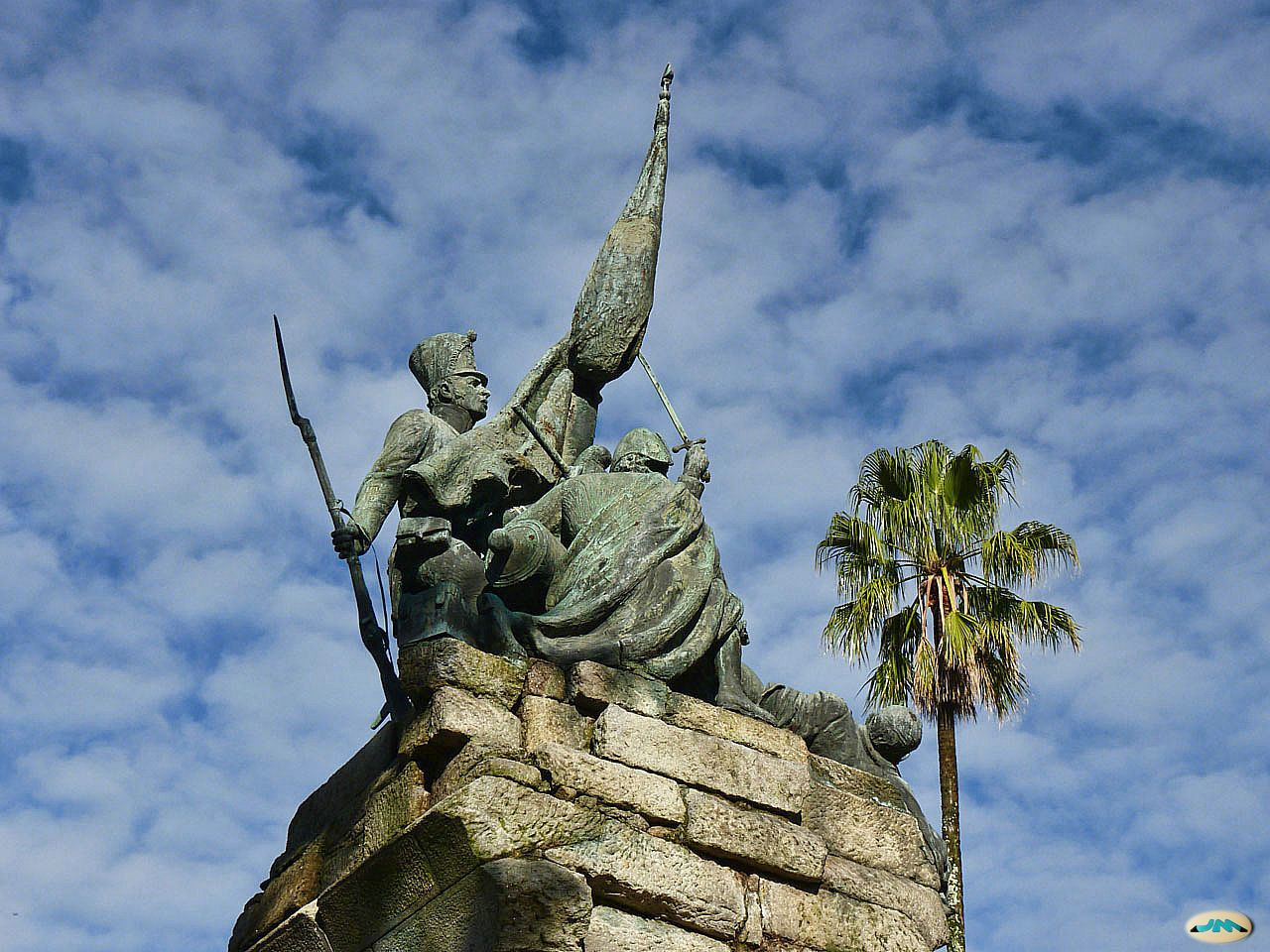

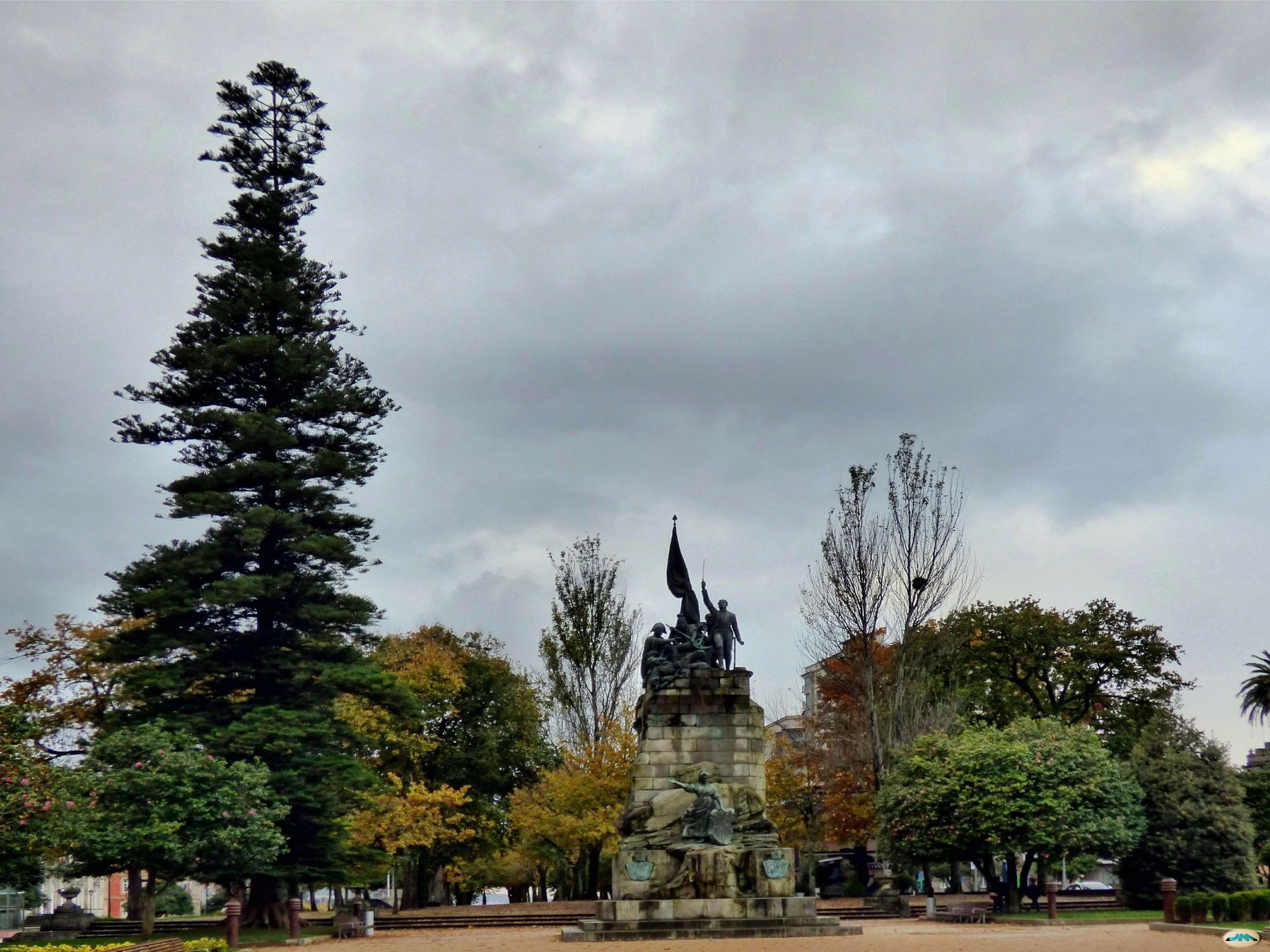

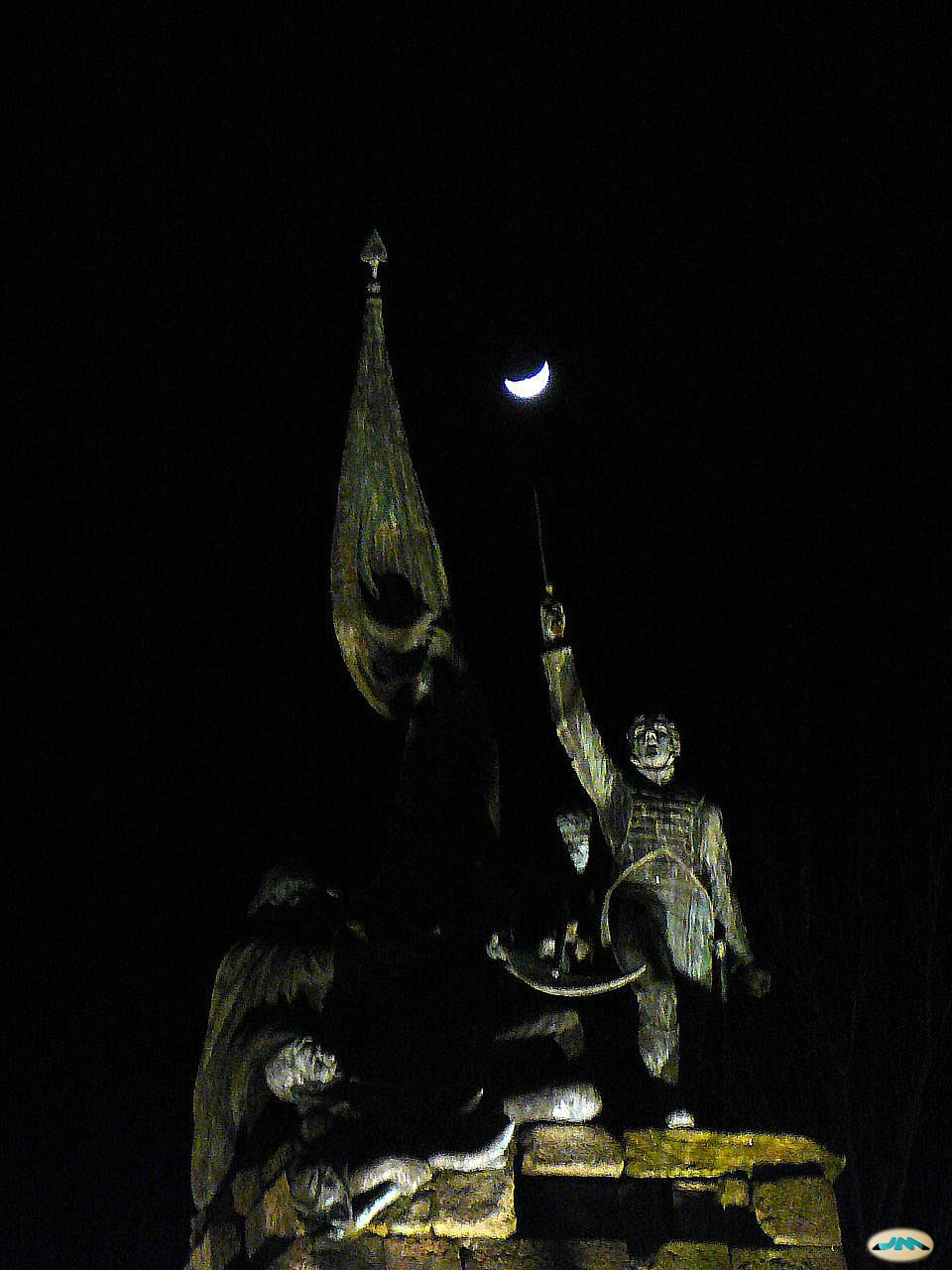

== Bibliography ==
- Gallego Esperanza, Mª de las Mercedes, 1996: La Escultura Pública en Pontevedra. Pontevedra, Diputación de Pontevedra, ISBN 9788488363350.
- Portela Sandoval, José, 1985: Julio González Pola y la escultura conmemorativa española en los albores del siglo XX, Boletín del Museo de Pontevedra. ISSN 0210-7791
- Taboada, Roberto; Hermida, Arturo, 2009: O monumento ós héroes de Pontesampaio e o seu contorno, Pontevedra, Diputación de Pontevedra, ISBN 978-84-8457-330-2.

== See also ==
=== Related articles ===
- Plaza de España (Pontevedra)
- Alameda de Pontevedra
- Battle of Puente Sampayo

=== External links ===
- on the website Escultura Urbana
- on the website Galicia Máxica
